= Slovakia national football team results =

Men's association football team results

This is a list of all Slovakia national football team results against other national teams to the present day.

== Results ==
All times are CET (UTC+01:00).

=== 1930s–40s ===
These games took place during the Second World War, under the period of the Slovak Republic (Slovak State), a partially-recognized client state of Nazi Germany. All games were friendlies against Axis-aligned nations.

==== 1939 ====
27 August 1939 International Friendly	Slovakia	2-0	Germany	Bratislava, Slovakia
	Jozef Luknár 19'; Ján Arpáš 78'			Stadium: Tehelné Pole; Attendance: 17,000; Referee: Mika Popovic (Yugoslavia)

3 December 1939 International Friendly	Germany	3-1	Slovakia	Chemnitz, Germany
	Helmut Schon 65'; Ernst Lehner 66'; Hans Fiederer 79'		Jozef Luknár 63'	Stadium: Großkampfbahn; Attendance: 7,000; Referee: Otto Remke (Denmark)

==== 1940 ====
6 June 1940 International Friendly	Bulgaria	1-4	Slovakia	Sofia, Bulgaria
	Yanko Stojanov		František Bolček; Jan Foldes; Jozef Luknár; František Vysocký	Stadium: Yunak Stadium; Attendance: 5,360; Referee: Mika Popović (Yugoslavia)

15 September 1940 International Friendly	Slovakia	0-1	Germany	Bratislava, Slovakia
			Ludwig Durek 81'	Stadium: Tehelné Pole; Attendance: 15,000; Referee: Giovanni Scarpi (Italy)

==== 1941 ====
8 September 1941 International Friendly	Slovakia	1-1	Croatia	Bratislava, Slovakia
	František Vysocký 89'		Slavko Beda 82'	Stadium: Tehelné Pole; Attendance: 15,000; Referee: Alois Beranek (Germany)

28 September 1941 International Friendly	Croatia	5-2	Slovakia	Zagreb, Croatia
	Slavko Pavletić 5', 34'; Franjo Wölfl 28'; 55'; Branko Pleše 46'		Július Besina 66'; František Bolček 87'	Attendance: 12,000; Referee: Alois Beranek (Germany)

14 October 1941 International Friendly	Romania	3-2	Slovakia	Bucharest, Romania
	Silviu Bindea 44', 50'; Kostas Choumis 88'		Jozef Kuchár 15'; František Bolček 58'	Stadium: Stadionul Republicii; Attendance: 15,000; Referee: Generoso Dattilo (Italy)

7 December 1941 International Friendly	Germany	4-0	Slovakia	Breslau, German Reich
	Fritz Walter 6'; Ludwig Durek 9'; Edmund Conen 27', 62'			Stadium: Hermann–Göring–Stadion; Attendance: 20,000; Referee: Petre Kroner (Romania)

==== 1942 ====
7 June 1942 International Friendly	Slovakia	1-2	Croatia	Bratislava, Slovakia
	Štefan Fabián 8'		Zvonimir Cimermančić 7', 30'	Stadium: Tehelné Pole; Attendance: 15,000; Referee: Karl Weimar (Germany)

23 August 1942 International Friendly	Slovakia	1-0	Romania	Bratislava, Slovakia
	František Bolček 15'			Stadium: Tehelné Pole; Referee: Helmut Fink (Germany)

6 September 1942 International Friendly	Croatia	6-1	Slovakia	Zagreb, Croatia
	Franjo Wölfl 32'; August Lešnik 65', 76', 90'; Milan Antolković 83'; Zvonimir Cimermančić 88'		Ján Podhradský 81'	Stadium: Stadion Kranjčevićeva; Attendance: 9,000; Referee: Todor Atanasov (Bulgaria)

22 November 1942 International Friendly	Slovakia	2–5	Germany	Bratislava, Slovakia
	Jozef Luknár 49'; Štefan Biro 62'		August Klinger 1', 44', 46'; Eddi Adamkiewicz 62'; Karl Decker 83'	Stadium: Tehelné Pole; Attendance: 12,000; Referee: Franjol Bazant (Croatia)

==== 1943 ====
10 April 1943 International Friendly	Croatia	1-0	Slovakia	Zagreb, Croatia
	Milan Antolković 65'			Stadium: Stadion Concordije; Attendance: 10,000; Referee: Todor Atanasov (Bulgaria)

7 June 1943 International Friendly	Slovakia	1-3	Croatia	Bratislava, Slovakia
	Miloslav Danko 35'		Mirko Kokotović 2', 85'; Franjo Wölfl 82'	Stadium: Tehelné Pole; Attendance: 20,000; Referee: Petre Kroner (Romania)

13 June 1943 International Friendly	Romania	2-2	Slovakia	Bucharest, Romania
	Bazil Marian 12'; Iosif Kovács 48'		František Bolček 50'; Jozef Baláži 88'	Stadium: Giuleșt; Attendance: 15,000; Referee: Todor Atasanov (Bulgaria)

==== 1944 ====
9 April 1944 International Friendly	Croatia	7–3	Slovakia	Zagreb, Croatia
	Franjo Wölfl 8', 19', 76'; Antun Lokošek 27'; Zvonimir Cimermančić 31'; August Lešnik 70', 76'	Report	Ján Arpáš 25', 47' (pen.), 88'	Stadium: Stadion Concordije; Attendance: 8,000; Referee: Johann Brandweiner (Germany)

=== 1990s ===
==== 1992 ====
Matches of 1992 took place, while Slovakia was still a part of Czechoslovakia. The team of Slovakia however participated under its own flag and anthem.

28 June 1992 2nd Shanghai International Tournament	China	2-3	Slovakia	Shanghai, China
	Goal		Štefan Maixner; Štefan Maixner; Štefan Maixner

14 October 1992 International Friendly	Lithuania	0–1	Slovakia	Vilnius, Lithuania
			25' Július Šimon	Attendance: 1,000; Referee: Sergejus Slyva (Lithuania)

==== 1993 ====
Matches of 1993 took place, while Slovakia was already an independent nation, but due to ongoing qualification for 1994 FIFA World Cup qualification (UEFA), it was represented by and completed the campaign as a joint Czechoslovakia national football team under a title "Representation of Czechs and Slovaks" (RCS). The first official match of modern Slovakia, is therefore a match against United Arab Emirates national football team in 1994.

30 March 1993 International Friendly	Slovakia	2-2	Lithuania	Dunajská Streda, Slovakia
	Ľubomír Luhový 27'; Pavol Diňa 55' (pen.)		41', 71' Ricardas Zdancius	Stadium: Mestský štadión Dunajská Streda; Attendance: 2,010; Referee: Karol Ihring (Slovakia)

16 November 1993 International Friendly	Slovakia	2-0	Slovenia	Prievidza, Slovakia
	Ľubomír Faktor 36'; Ľubomír Luhový 57'			Stadium: Futbalový štadión Prievidza

==== 1994 ====
2 February 1994 1994 Friendship Tournament	United Arab Emirates	0–1	Slovakia	Sharjah, United Arab Emirates
			Vladimír Weiss 46'	Stadium: Sharjah Stadium; Attendance: 5,000; Referee: Ahmed Ibrahim Hakeem

4 February 1994 1994 Friendship Tournament	Egypt	1–0	Slovakia	Sharjah, United Arab Emirates
	Hossam Hassan 75'			Stadium: Sharjah Stadium; Referee: Ahmed Ibrahim Hakeem

6 February 1994 1994 Friendship Tournament	Morocco	2–1	Slovakia	Sharjah, United Arab Emirates
	Youssef Fertoute 23'; Abdelkrim El Hadrioui 87'		Ľubomír Faktor 27'	Stadium: Sharjah Stadium; Attendance: 8,000; Referee: Xuezhi Wang

30 March 1994 International Friendly	Malta	1–2	Slovakia	Ta' Qali, Malta
	Kristian Laferla 45'		Jaroslav Timko 13'; Viliam Hýravý 69'	Stadium: Ta' Qali National Stadium; Attendance: 4,000; Referee: Loris Stafoggia

20 April 1994 International Friendly	Slovakia	4–1	Croatia	Bratislava, Slovakia
	Peter Dubovský 24' (pen.), 61' (pen.); Vladimír Kinder 68'; Ľubomír Moravčík 83'		Joško Popović 67'	Stadium: Tehelné pole Attendance: 6,511; Referee: Sandor Puhl

29 May 1994 International Friendly	Russia	2–1	Slovakia	Moscow, Russia
	Andrei Piatnitski 49'; Ilya Tsymbalar 60'		Dušan Tittel 35'	Stadium: Luzhniki Stadium; Attendance: 15,000; Referee: Vadim Zhuk

16 August 1994 International Friendly	Slovakia	1–1	Malta	Bratislava, Slovakia
	Michal Hipp 3'		Kristian Laferla 74'	Stadium: Tehelné pole Attendance: 5,000; Referee: Hubert Forstinger (Austria)

7 September 1994 1996 UEFA EURO; Qualifying Group 1	Slovakia	0–0	France	Bratislava, Slovakia
20:30				Stadium: Tehelné pole Attendance: 14,329; Referee: Peter Mikkelsen (Denmark)

12 October 1994 1996 UEFA EURO; Qualifying Group 1	Israel	2–2	Slovakia	Ramat Gan, Israel
18:00	Ronen Harazi 23'; Tal Banin 32' (pen.)		Rusnák 5'; Moravčík 14'; Marián Zeman (red card) 30'	Stadium: National Stadium; Attendance: 9,000; Referee: John Blankenstein (Netherlands)

12 November 1994 1996 UEFA EURO; Qualifying Group 1	Romania	3–2	Slovakia	Bucharest, Romania
17:00	Gheorghe Popescu 7'; Gheorghe Hagi 46'; Daniel Prodan 82'		Peter Dubovský 56'; Miroslav Chvíla 78'	Stadium: Stadionul Steaua; Attendance: 20,000; Referee: Vadim Zhuk (Belarus)

==== 1995 ====
22 February 1995 International Friendly	Brazil	5–0	Slovakia	Fortaleza, Brazil
	Souza 45'; Bebeto 67', 90+2'; Túlio Maravilha 76'; Márcio Roberto dos Santos 87'		Zeman (red card) 60'	Stadium: Castelão; Attendance: 80,000

9 March 1995 International Friendly	Slovakia	2–1	Russia	Košice, Slovakia
	Peter Dubovský 19', 69'		Valeri Karpin 76'	Stadium: Všešportový areál Attendance: 10,200; Referee: Hans-Jürgen Weber (Germany)

29 March 1995 1996 UEFA EURO; Qualifying Group 1	Slovakia	4–1	Azerbaijan	Košice, Slovakia
18:00	Dušan Tittel 34'; Jaroslav Timko 40', 51'; Peter Dubovský 45' (pen.)		Nazim Suleymanov 80' (pen.)	Stadium: Všešportový areál Attendance: 12,450; Referee: Vassilios Nikakis (Greece)

26 April 1995 1996 UEFA EURO; Qualifying Group 1	France	4–0	Slovakia	Nantes, France
20:45	Ondrej Krištofík 27' (o.g.); David Ginola 42'; Laurent Blanc 57'; Vincent Guérin 62'			Stadium: Stade de la Beaujoire; Attendance: 23,910; Referee: Bernd Heynemann (Germany)

8 May 1995 International Friendly	Slovakia	1–1	Czech Republic	Bratislava, Slovakia
	Jaroslav Timko 58'		Daniel Smejkal 32'	Stadium: Tehelné pole Attendance: 15,000; Referee: Leif Sundell (Sweden)

7 June 1995 1996 UEFA EURO; Qualifying Group 1	Poland	5–0	Slovakia	Zabrze, Poland
	Andrzej Juskowiak 10', 72'; Tomasz Wieszczycki 58'; Kosecki 63'; Piotr Nowak 69'			Stadium: Ernest Pohl Stadium; Attendance: 9,515; Referee: Robert Sedlacek (Austria)

22 June 1995 International Friendly	Argentina	6–0	Slovakia	Mendoza, Argentina
	Marcelo Gallardo 58', 69' (pen.); Javier Zanetti 61'; Gabriel Batistuta 68', 90'; Diego Simeone 85'		Tibor Jančula (red card) 81'	Stadium: Estadio Malvinas Argentinas; Attendance: 16,000; Referee: Angel Osvaldo Sanchez

25 June 1995 International Friendly	Peru	1–0	Slovakia	Lima, Peru
	Nolberto Solano 57' (pen.)			Stadium: Estadio Nacional; Attendance: 7,740

16 August 1995 1996 UEFA EURO; Qualifying Group 1	Azerbaijan	0–1	Slovakia	Trabzon, Turkey
	Vladyslav Nosenko (red card) 90+1'		Jančula 60'; Róbert Tomaschek (red card) 81'	Stadium: Hüseyin Avni Aker Stadium; Attendance: 100; Referee: Alain Hamer (Luxembourg)

6 September 1995 1996 UEFA EURO; Qualifying Group 1	Slovakia	1–0	Israel	Košice, Slovakia
18:00	Tibor Jančula 54'			Stadium: Všešportový areál Attendance: 7,810; Referee: Marnix Sandra (Belgium)

11 October 1995 1996 UEFA EURO; Qualifying Group 1	Slovakia	4–1	Poland	Bratislava, Slovakia
17:30	Peter Dubovský 31' (pen.); Tibor Jančula 68'; Marek Ujlaky 77'; Július Šimon 82'		Juskowiak 20'; Roman Kosecki (red card) 65'; Piotr Świerczewski (red card) 75'	Stadium: Tehelné pole Attendance: 11,653; Referee: Jorge Monteiro Coroado (Portugal)

15 November 1995 1996 UEFA EURO; Qualifying Group 1	Slovakia	0–2	Romania	Košice, Slovakia
17:30			Gheorghe Hagi 66'; Dorinel Munteanu 82'	Stadium: Všešportový areál Attendance: 9,676; Referee: Jaap Uilenberg (Netherlands)

6 December 1995 International Friendly	Lebanon	2–1	Slovakia	Beirut, Lebanon
	Jamal Taha 50'; Hassan Ayoub 85' (pen.)		Robert Siminic 36'	Stadium: Bourj Hammoud Stadium; Attendance: 6,000

==== 1996 ====
30 January 1996 International Friendly	Bolivia	2–0	Slovakia	Santa Cruz, Bolivia
	Rubén Tufiño 10'; Roly Paniagua 35'			Stadium: Estadio Ramón Tahuichi Aguilera; Attendance: 35,000; Referee: Antezana Lugones

27 March 1996 International Friendly	Slovakia	4–0	Belarus	Nitra, Slovakia
	Július Šimon 24'; Jaroslav Timko 32'; Marek Ujlaky 61'; Jozef Juriga 83'			Stadium: Štadión pod Zoborom; Attendance: 3,058; Referee: Marek Kowalczyk

24 April 1996 International Friendly	Slovakia	0–0	Bulgaria	Trnava, Slovakia
				Stadium: Štadión Antona Malatinského; Attendance: 11,000; Referee: István Vad (Hungary)

9 May 1996 International Friendly	Sweden	2–1	Slovakia	Helsingborg, Sweden
	Martin Dahlin 51'; Marián Zeman 85' (o.g.)		Marián Zeman 65'	Stadium: Olympiastadion; Attendance: 10,798; Referee: David Elleray (England)

18 May 1996 International Friendly	Mexico	5–2	Slovakia	Chicago, United States of America
	Alberto García Aspe 21' (pen.), 44' (pen.); Ramón Ramírez 35', 88'; David Patiño 66'		Štefan Maixner 34'; Jozef Juriga 65'; Ladislav Molnar (red card) 44'	Stadium: Soldier Field; Attendance: 25,000

31 August 1996 1998 FIFA World Cup; Qualifying Group 6	Faroe Islands	1–2	Slovakia	Toftir, Faroe Islands
	Jan Allan Müller 60'		Ľubomír Moravčík 13'; Peter Dubovský 88'	Stadium: Svangaskarð; Attendance: 1,445; Referee: Terje Hauge (Norway)

22 September 1996 1998 FIFA World Cup; Qualifying Group 6	Slovakia	6–0	Malta	Bratislava, Slovakia
	Dušan Tittel 13', 90'; Július Šimon 15'; Marián Zeman 37'; Jaroslav Timko 56'; Peter Dubovský 59'			Stadium: Tehelné pole Attendance: 2,236; Referee: Giorgos Bikas (Greece)

23 October 1996 1998 FIFA World Cup; Qualifying Group 6	Slovakia	3–0	Faroe Islands	Bratislava, Slovakia
	Peter Dubovský 20'; Tibor Jančula 44'; Július Šimon 57' (pen.)			Stadium: Tehelné pole Attendance: 5,442; Referee: Salem Prolic (Bosnia and Herzegovina)

13 November 1996 1998 FIFA World Cup; Qualifying Group 6	Spain	4–1	Slovakia	Santa Cruz, Spain
	Juan Antonio Pizzi 31'; Guillermo Amor 47'; Luis Enrique 51'; Fernando Hierro 62'		Tittel 39'	Stadium: Estadio Heliodoro Rodríguez López; Attendance: 13,500; Referee: Markus Merk (Germany)

==== 1997 ====
2 February 1997 International Friendly	Bolivia	0–1	Slovakia	La Paz, Bolivia
			Jozef Kožlej 86'	Stadium: Estadio Hernando Siles; Attendance: 30,000; Referee: Antezana Lugones

5 February 1997 International Friendly	Costa Rica	2–2	Slovakia	Cartago, Costa Rica
	Rónald Gómez 1'; Rónald González Brenes 90'		Szilárd Németh 70'; Róbert Semenník 74'; Július Šimon (red card) 90'	Stadium: Estadio José Rafael Fello Meza Ivankovich; Attendance: 25,000; Referee: William Mattus

8 February 1997 International Friendly	Colombia	1–0	Slovakia	Pereira, Colombia
	Faustino Asprilla 52'			Stadium: Estadio Hernán Ramírez Villegas; Attendance: 17,000

11 March 1997 International Friendly	Bulgaria	0–1	Slovakia	Sofia, Bulgaria
			Jozef Majoroš 84'	Stadium: Vasil Levski National Stadium; Attendance: 7,000

31 March 1997 1998 FIFA World Cup; Qualifying Group 6	Malta	0–2	Slovakia	Ta'Qali, Malta
			Tibor Jančula 38'; Dušan Tittel 90'	Stadium: Ta'Qali Stadium; Attendance: 4,202; Referee: Marek Kowalczyk (Poland)

19 April 1997 International Friendly	Slovakia	3–1	Iceland	Trnava, Slovakia
	Július Šimon 36' (pen.), 85' (pen.); Jaroslav Timko 54'; Vladimír Kinder (red card) 57'		Helgi Sigurðsson 26'	Stadium: Štadión Antona Malatinského; Attendance: 3,403; Referee: Igor Yarmenchuk

8 June 1997 1998 FIFA World Cup; Qualifying Group 6	FR Yugoslavia	2–0	Slovakia	Belgrade, Yugoslavia
	Dejan Savićević 17'; Predrag Mijatović 75'			Stadium: Stadion Crvena Zvezda; Attendance: 22,044; Referee: Peter Mikkelsen (Denmark)

6 August 1997 International Friendly	Slovakia	1–0	Switzerland	Bratislava, Slovakia
	Tibor Jančula 28'			Stadium: Tehelné pole Attendance: 3,470; Referee: Zeljko Siric

24 August 1997 1998 FIFA World Cup; Qualifying Group 6	Slovakia	2–1	Czech Republic	Bratislava, Slovakia
	Tibor Jančula 45'; Jozef Majoroš 55'		Vladimír Šmicer 15'	Stadium: Tehelné pole Attendance: 22,500; Referee: Piero Ceccarini (Italy)

10 September 1997 1998 FIFA World Cup; Qualifying Group 6	Slovakia	1–1	FR Yugoslavia	Bratislava, Slovakia
	Jozef Majoroš 65'		Siniša Mihajlović 80'	Stadium: Tehelné pole Attendance: 22,500; Referee: Anders Frisk (Sweden)

24 September 1997 1998 FIFA World Cup; Qualifying Group 6	Slovakia	1–2	Spain	Bratislava, Slovakia
	Jozef Majoroš 75'		Kiko 47'; Guillermo Amor 76'	Stadium: Tehelné pole Attendance: 13,667; Referee: László Vágner (Hungary)

11 October 1997 1998 FIFA World Cup; Qualifying Group 6	Czech Republic	3–0	Slovakia	Prague, Czech Republic
	Vladimír Šmicer 54'; Horst Siegl 70'; Jiří Novotný 73'			Stadium: Generali Arena; Attendance: 5,428; Referee: Urs Meier (Switzerland)

==== 1998 ====
28 January 1998 International Friendly	Italy	3–0	Slovakia	Catania, Italy
	Fabrizio Ravanelli 49'; Alessandro Del Piero 54'; Roberto Di Matteo 63'			Stadium: Stadio Angelo Massimino; Attendance: 26,919

6 February 1998 Cyprus International; Football Tournament	Slovenia	1–1	Slovakia	Limassol, Cyprus
	Zlatko Zahovič 70'		[ Ľubomír Moravčík 76'	Stadium: Tsirion Stadium; Attendance: 200; Referee: Costas Kapitanis

7 February 1998 Cyprus International; Football Tournament	Slovakia	2–1	Iceland	Limassol, Cyprus
	Szilárd Németh 55'; Ľubomír Moravčík 65'		Bjarki Gunnlaugsson 84'	Stadium: Tsirion Stadium; Attendance: 300; Referee: Costas Kapitanis

9 February 1998 Cyprus International; Football Tournament; 3rd Place Match	Slovakia	2–0	Finland	Larnaca, Cyprus
	Dušan Tittel 31'; Jozef Pisár 52'			Stadium: Antonis Papadopoulos Stadium; Attendance: 6,000

25 March 1998 International Friendly	Northern Ireland	1–0	Slovakia	Belfast, Northern Ireland
	Steve Lomas 51'			Stadium: Windsor Park; Attendance: 7,895; Referee: Alan Christopher Howells

15 April 1998 International Friendly	Slovakia	0–0	South Korea	Bratislava, Slovakia
				Stadium: Tehelné pole Attendance: 1,873

29 May 1998 International Friendly	Croatia	1–2	Slovakia	Pula, Croatia
	Goran Vlaović 43'		Tibor Jančula 4'; Jozef Majoroš 58'	Stadium: Gradski stadium Attendance: 6,000; Referee: Milan Mitrović

19 August 1998 International Friendly	Slovakia	0–0	Finland	Košice, Slovakia
				Stadium: Lokomotíva Stadium; Attendance: 3,220; Referee: Miroslav Liba

5 September 1998 2000 UEFA EURO; Qualifying Group 7	Slovakia	3–0	Azerbaijan	Košice, Slovakia
20:15	Martin Fabuš 17'; Peter Dubovský 26' (pen.); Ľubomír Moravčík 37'			Stadium: Lokomotíva Stadium; Attendance: 3,243; Referee: Alan Snoddy (Northern Ireland)

10 October 1998 2000 UEFA EURO; Qualifying Group 7	Liechtenstein	0–4	Slovakia	Vaduz, Liechtenstein
16:30			Miroslav Sovič 3'; Peter Dubovský 13'; Róbert Tomaschek 36', 61'	Stadium: Rheinpark Stadion; Attendance: 2,500; Referee: Vladimir Antonov (Moldova)

14 October 1998 2000 UEFA EURO; Qualifying Group 7	Slovakia	0–3	Portugal	Bratislava, Slovakia
20:30			João Pinto 17', 30'; Abel Xavier 70'	Stadium: Tehelné pole Attendance: 22,059; Referee: Oğuz Sarvan (Turkey)

10 November 1998 International Friendly	Slovakia	1–3	Poland	Bratislava, Slovakia
	Tibor Jančula 57'		Piotr Reiss 56'; Wojciech Kowalczyk 66', 75'	Stadium: Tehelné pole Attendance: 1,365; Referee: Manfred Schuttengruber

==== 1999 ====
3 March 1999 International Friendly	Bulgaria	2–0	Slovakia	Sofia, Bulgaria
	Ilian Iliev 22'; Hristo Yovov 41'; Ivaylo Yordanov (red card)			Stadium: Vasil Levski National Stadium; Attendance: 27,000; Referee: Miroslav Radoman

27 March 1999 2000 UEFA EURO; Qualifying Group 7	Romania	0–0	Slovakia	Bucharest, Romania
19:30			Vladimír Labant (red card) 80'	Stadium: Stadionul Naţional; Attendance: 15,000; Referee: Graham Barber (England)

31 March 1999 2000 UEFA EURO; Qualifying Group 7	Slovakia	0–0	Hungary	Bratislava, Slovakia
18:00				Stadium: Tehelné pole Attendance: 19,452; Referee: Claude Colombo (France)

19 May 1999 International Friendly	Slovakia	2–0	Bulgaria	Bratislava, Slovakia
	Milan Timko 9'; Róbert Tomaschek 89'			Stadium: Tehelné pole Attendance: 5,000

5 June 1999 2000 UEFA EURO; Qualifying Group 7	Portugal	1–0	Slovakia	Lisbon, Portugal
22:00	Nuno Capucho 64'			Stadium: Estádio José de Alvalade; Attendance: 20,300; Referee: Claus Bo Larsen (Denmark)

9 June 1999 2000 UEFA EURO; Qualifying Group 7	Hungary	0–1	Slovakia	Győr, Hungary
20:15			Fabuš 53'	Stadium: ETO Park; Attendance: 16,500; Referee: Manuel Díaz Vega (Spain)

18 August 1999 International Friendly	Slovakia	1–0	Israel	Bratislava, Slovakia
	Martin Fabuš 80'			Stadium: Pasienky; Attendance: 2,368

4 September 1999 2000 UEFA EURO; Qualifying Group 7	Slovakia	1–5	Romania	Bratislava, Slovakia
20:15	Vladimír Labant 22' (pen.)		Adrian Ilie 6'; Gheorghe Hagi 30'; Liviu Ciobotariu 66'; Viorel Moldovan 88', 90'	Stadium: Tehelné pole Attendance: 8,143; Referee: Graziano Cesari (Italy)

8 September 1999 2000 UEFA EURO; Qualifying Group 7	Slovakia	2–0	Liechtenstein	Dubnica nad Váhom, Slovakia
16:00	Szilárd Németh 4'; Miroslav Karhan 55'; Jozef Valachovič (yellow card) 16' (yellow-red card) 37'			Stadium: Mestský štadión Attendance: 3,052; Referee: Andreas Georgiou (Cyprus)

9 October 1999 2000 UEFA EURO; Qualifying Group 7	Azerbaijan	0–1	Slovakia	Baku, Azerbaijan
15:00			Vladimír Labant 70'	Stadium: Tofik Bakhramov Stadium; Attendance: 6,000; Referee: Kyros Vassaras (Greece)

17 November 1999 International Friendly	Peru	2–1	Slovakia	Lima, Peru
	Roberto Palacios 22'; Nolberto Solano 37'		Vladimír Kožuch 18'	Stadium: Estadio Nacional; Attendance: 29,089

20 November 1999 International Friendly	Colombia	1–0	Slovakia	Bogotá, Colombia
	Stanislav Varga 65' (o.g.)			Stadium: Estadio El Campín; Attendance: 12,000

23 November 1999 International Friendly	Guatemala	0–1	Slovakia	Guatemala City, Guatemala
			Jaroslav Hrabal 76'	Stadium: Estadio Mateo Flores; Attendance: 4,000

25 November 1999 International Friendly	Costa Rica	4–0	Slovakia	Alajuela, Costa Rica
	Walter Centeno 28'; Jewison Benneth Grant 47'; Ondrej Šmelko 73' (o.g.); Luis Diego Arnáez 80'		Marek Ujlaky (red card) 48'; Jaroslav Hrabal (red card) 50'	Stadium: Estadio Alejandro Morera Soto; Attendance: 18,500

=== 2000s ===
==== 2000 ====
2 February 2000 Cyprus International; Football Tournament; Quarter-finals	Slovakia	0–2	Georgia	Larnaca, Cyprus
			Temuri Ketsbaia 82'; Mikhail Kavelashvili 87'	Stadium: Antonis Papadopoulos Stadium; Attendance: 400

4 February 2000 Cyprus International; Football Tournament; Play-off	Slovakia	3–1	Latvia	Paphos, Cyprus
	Karol Kisel 30'; Marek Mintál 48'; Peter Babnič 51'		Andrejs Štolcers 84' (red card) 89'	Stadium: Pafiako Stadium; Attendance: 1,000; Referee: Anastasios Papaioannou

6 February 2000 Cyprus International; Football Tournament; 5th Place Match	Slovakia	0–2	Moldova	Larnaka, Cyprus
			Ion Testemiţanu 77' (pen.); Alexandru Popovici 81'	Stadium: GSZ Stadium; Attendance: 1,200

9 February 2000 Copa Ciudad de Valparaíso; Group stage	Bulgaria	1–0	Slovakia	Valparaíso, Chile
	Krassimir Chomakov 81'			Stadium: Estadio Playa Ancha; Attendance: 5,000; Referee: Pablo Pozo

12 February 2000 Copa Ciudad de Valparaíso; Group stage	Australia	0–0	Slovakia	Valparaíso, Chile
				Stadium: Estadio Playa Ancha; Attendance: 5,000; Referee: Luis Mariano Peña

15 February 2000 Copa Ciudad de Valparaíso; Group stage	Chile	0–2	Slovakia	Valparaíso, Chile
	Rafael Olarra (red card) 86'		Igor Bališ 4'; Ondrej Šmelko 16'; Jozef Valachovič (red card) 66'	Stadium: Estadio Playa Ancha; Attendance: 8,000; Referee: Guido Aros

24 May 2000 International Friendly	Slovakia	1–1	Saudi Arabia	Nitra, Slovakia
	Vladimír Kožuch 37'		Nawaf Al Temyat 12'	Stadium: Štadión pod Zoborom

27 May 2000 International Friendly	Norway	2–0	Slovakia	Oslo, Norway
19:00	Ole Gunnar Solskjær 21' (pen.); Steffen Iversen 85'			Stadium: Ullevaal Stadion; Attendance: 16,350; Referee: Sten Johanson (Sweden)

31 May 2000 International Friendly	Russia	1–1	Slovakia	Moscow, Russia
	Vladimir Beschastnykh 60'		Marek Ujlaky 25'	Stadium: Dynamo Stadium; Attendance: 8,000

11 June 2000 2000 Kirin Cup; Match 1	Japan	1–1	Slovakia	Rifu, Japan
	Shunsuke Nakamura 9'		Peter Dzúrik 7'	Stadium: Miyagi Stadium; Attendance: 45,831; Referee: Kim Young-joo (South Korea)

14 June 2000 2000 Kirin Cup; Match 2	Slovakia	2–0	Bolivia	Tosu, Japan
	Roman Kratochvíl 21'; Martin Fabuš 47'			Stadium: Tosu Stadium; Attendance: 8,023; Referee: Masayoshi Okada (Japan)

16 August 2000 International Friendly	Slovakia	1–1	Croatia	Bratislava, Slovakia
	Szilárd Németh 28'		Boško Balaban 23'	Stadium: Tehelné Pole; Attendance: 4,298; Referee: Michal Beneš (Czech Republic)

3 September 2000 2002 FIFA World Cup; Qualifying Group 4	Slovakia	2–0	Macedonia	Bratislava, Slovakia
20:15	Goran Stavrevski 3' (o.g.); Igor Demo 74'			Stadium: Tehelné Pole; Attendance: 4,011; Referee: Alain Hamer (Luxembourg)

7 October 2000 2002 FIFA World Cup; Qualifying Group 4	Moldova	0–1	Slovakia	Chişinău, Moldova
18:00			Szilárd Németh 79'	Stadium: Stadionul Republican; Attendance: 3,500; Referee: Fritz Stuchlik (Austria)

11 October 2000 2002 FIFA World Cup; Qualifying Group 4	Slovakia	0–0	Sweden	Bratislava, Slovakia
20:15				Stadium: Tehelné Pole; Attendance: 11,227; Referee: Hugh Dallas (Scotland)

15 November 2000 International Friendly	Greece	0–2	Slovakia	Rhodes, Greece
			Szilárd Németh 17'; Peter Németh 72'	Stadium: Diagoras Stadium; Attendance: 1,500; Referee: Rune Pedersen (Norway)

==== 2001 ====
27 February 2001 International Friendly	Algeria	1–1	Slovakia	Algiers, Algeria
	Isâad Bourahli 4'		Szilárd Németh 65'	Stadium: Stade 5 Juillet 1962; Attendance: 22,000

24 March 2001 2002 FIFA World Cup; Qualifying Group 4	Turkey	1–1	Slovakia	Istanbul, Turkey
20:00	Hakan Şükür 55' (pen.)		Róbert Tomaschek 68'	Stadium: Ali Sami Yen Stadium; Attendance: 22,000; Referee: Ryszard Wojcik (Poland)

28 March 2001 2002 FIFA World Cup; Qualifying Group 4	Slovakia	3–1	Azerbaijan	Trnava, Slovakia
17:00	Szilárd Németh 1', 10'; Ľubomír Meszároš 57'		Vadim Vasilyev 3' (pen.); Emin Agaev (yellow card) 53' (yellow-red card) 78'	Stadium: Štadión Antona Malatinského; Attendance: 10,000; Referee: Costas Kapitanis (Cyprus)

25 April 2001 International Friendly	Romania	0–0	Slovakia	Ploieşti, Romania
				Stadium: Stadionul Ilie Oană; Attendance: 5,000

19 May 2001 International Friendly	Germany	2–0	Slovakia	Bremen, Germany
	Gerald Asamoah 50'; Frank Baumann 56'			Stadium: Weserstadion; Attendance: 18,000; Referee: Claude Colombo (France)

2 June 2001 2002 FIFA World Cup; Qualifying Group 4	Sweden	2–0	Slovakia	Stockholm, Sweden
18:00	Marcus Allbäck 45', 51'			Stadium: Råsunda Stadium; Attendance: 34,320; Referee: José María García-Aranda (Spain)

6 June 2001 2002 FIFA World Cup; Qualifying Group 4	Azerbaijan	2–0	Slovakia	Baku, Azerbaijan
19:00	Vadim Vasilyev 26'; Zaur Tagizade 65'			Stadium: Tofiq Bahramov Stadium; Attendance: 10,000; Referee: Nicolai Vollquartz (Denmark)

21 June 2001 2001 Merdeka Tournament	Slovakia	0–1	Bosnia and Herzegovina	Kuala Lumpur, Malaysia
			Milan Jambor 63' (o.g.)	Stadium: Shah Alam Stadium; Attendance: 5,000; Referee: Haji Salleh (Malaysia)

23 June 2001 2001 Merdeka Tournament	Malaysia	0–2	Slovakia	Kuala Lumpur, Malaysia
			Mário Breška 19', 41'	Stadium: Shah Alam Stadium; Attendance: 8,000

25 June 2001 2001 Merdeka Tournament	Bahrain	2–0	Slovakia	Kuala Lumpur, Malaysia
	Rashed Jamal 35', 66'			Stadium: Shah Alam Stadium; Attendance: 200; Referee: Haji Salleh (Malaysia)

15 August 2001 International Friendly	Slovakia	3–4	Iran	Bratislava, Slovakia
	Tomáš Oravec 18', 19'; Róbert Vittek 29'		Ali Karimi 7', 16', 83'; Alireza Vahedi Nikbakht 42'	Stadium: Tehelné Pole; Attendance: 3,421; Referee: Kos (Slovenia)

1 September 2001 2002 FIFA World Cup; Qualifying Group 4	Slovakia	0–1	Turkey	Bratislava, Slovakia
19:45			Hakan Şükür 34'	Stadium: Tehelné Pole; Attendance: 8,783; Referee: Vitor Melo Pereira (Portugal)

5 September 2001 2002 FIFA World Cup; Qualifying Group 4	Slovakia	4–2	Moldova	Trenčín, Slovakia
19:45	Peter Németh 54'; Szilárd Németh 59'; Igor Demo 64', 70'		Serghei Cleşcenco 11'; Radu Rebeja 76'	Stadium: Štadión na Sihoti; Attendance: 3,000; Referee: Mikko Vuorela (Finland)

7 October 2001 2002 FIFA World Cup; Qualifying Group 4	Macedonia	0–5	Slovakia	Skopje, Macedonia
19:00			Ľubomír Reiter 28'; Peter Dzúrik 56'; Peter Németh 72'; Attila Pinte 80'; Tomáš Oravec 89'	Stadium: Gradski Stadion; Attendance: 3,000; Referee: Mike Riley (England)

==== 2002 ====
6 February 2002 International Friendly	Iran	2–3	Slovakia	Tehran, Iran
	Ali Karimi 20', 80' (pen.)		Ľubomír Reiter 7', 29'; Marek Mintál 68'	Stadium: Azadi Stadium; Attendance: 20,000; Referee: Masoud Moradi (Iran)

27 March 2002 International Friendly	Austria	2–0	Slovakia	Graz, Austria
20:30	Ronald Brunmayr 64'; Markus Weissenberger 78'			Stadium: Arnold Schwarzenegger-Stadion; Attendance: 9,100; Referee: Edgar Steinborn (Germany)

17 April 2002 International Friendly	Belgium	1–1	Slovakia	Brussels, Belgium
	Bart Goor 55'		Vladimír Janočko 82'	Stadium: King Baudouin Stadium; Attendance: 15,000; Referee: Bruno Coue (France)

19 April 2002 2002 Kirin Cup	Japan	1–0	Slovakia	Tokyo, Japan
	Akinori Nishizawa 38'			Stadium: National Stadium; Attendance: 57,000; Referee: Bae Jae-Young (South Korea)

14 May 2002 International Friendly	Slovakia	4–1	Uzbekistan	Prešov, Slovakia
	Vratislav Greško 5'; Jozef Kožlej 47', 79'; Marek Mintál 85'		Zaynitdin Tadjiyev 48'	Stadium: Štadión Tatran; Attendance: 3,850; Referee: Albeth (Norway)

21 August 2002 International Friendly	Czech Republic	4–1	Slovakia	Olomouc, Czech Republic
	Jan Koller 31', 64'; Tomáš Rosický 70', 78'		Szilárd Németh 16'	Stadium: Andrův stadion Attendance: 11,986; Referee: Georgios Douros (Greece)

7 September 2002 2004 UEFA Euro; Qualifying Group 7	Turkey	3–0	Slovakia	Istanbul, Turkey
19:30	Serhat Akın 14'; Arif Erdem 44', 65'			Stadium: Ali Sami Yen Stadium; Attendance: 18,000; Referee: Antonio Jesús López Nieto (Spain)

12 October 2002 2004 UEFA Euro; Qualifying Group 7	Slovakia	1–2	England	Bratislava, Slovakia
19:30	Szilárd Németh 23'		David Beckham 64'; Michael Owen 82'	Stadium: Tehelné pole Attendance: 27,000; Referee: Domenico Messina (Italy)

20 November 2002 International Friendly	Slovakia	1–1	Ukraine	Trnava, Slovakia
	Miroslav Karhan 64' (pen.)		Oleksandr Melashchenko 84'	Stadium: Štadión Antona Malatinského; Attendance: 2,859; Referee: Zbigniew Marczyk (Poland)

==== 2003 ====
12 February 2003 Cyprus International; Football Tournament; Semi-Finals	Romania	2–1	Slovakia	Larnaka, Cyprus
	Dorinel Munteanu 39'; Ionel Ganea 42'		Róbert Vittek 8'	Stadium: GSZ Stadium; Attendance: 300; Referee: ()

13 February 2003 Cyprus International; Football Tournament; 3rd Place Match	Cyprus	1–3	Slovakia	Larnaka, Cyprus
	Rainer Rauffman 40'		Ľubomír Reiter 1'; Róbert Vittek 66', 84'	Stadium: GSZ Stadium; Attendance: 250; Referee: ()

29 March 2003 2004 UEFA Euro; Qualifying Group 7	Macedonia	0–2	Slovakia	Skopje, Macedonia
19:00			Martin Petráš 28'; Ľubomír Reiter 90'	Stadium: Gradski Stadium; Attendance: 10,000; Referee: Laurent Duhamel (France)

2 April 2003 2004 UEFA Euro; Qualifying Group 7	Slovakia	4–0	Liechtenstein	Trnava, Slovakia
19:00	Ľubomír Reiter 19'; Szilárd Németh 50', 64'; Vladimír Janočko 89'			Stadium: Štadión Antona Malatinského; Attendance: Closed Doors; Referee: Darko Ceferin (Slovenia)

30 April 2003 International Friendly	Slovakia	2–2	Greece	Žilina, Slovakia
18:00	Szilárd Németh 14', 87'		Vasilios Tsiartas 13' (pen.); Lampros Choutos 76'	Stadium: Štadión Pod Dubňom; Attendance: 2,863; Referee: Stefan Messner (Austria)

7 June 2003 2004 UEFA Euro; Qualifying Group 7	Slovakia	0–1	Turkey	Bratislava, Slovakia
20:15			Nihat Kahveci 12'	Stadium: Tehelné pole Attendance: 15,000; Referee: Terje Hauge (Norway)

11 June 2003 2004 UEFA Euro; Qualifying Group 7	England	2–1	Slovakia	Middlesbrough, England
21:00	Michael Owen 61' (pen.), 72'		Vladimír Janočko 31'	Stadium: Riverside Stadium; Attendance: 35,000; Referee: Wolfgang Stark (Germany)

20 August 2003 International Friendly	Slovakia	0–0	Colombia	New York City, United States
				Stadium: Shea Stadium; Attendance: 25,000; Referee: ()

10 September 2003 2004 UEFA Euro; Qualifying Group 7	Slovakia	1–1	Macedonia	Žilina, Slovakia
20:15	Szilárd Németh 25'		Dragan Dimitrovski 62'	Stadium: Štadión Pod Dubňom; Attendance: 2,286; Referee: Leif Sundell (Sweden)

11 October 2003 2004 UEFA Euro; Qualifying Group 7	Liechtenstein	0–2	Slovakia	Vaduz, Liechtenstein
20:00			Róbert Vittek 40', 56'	Stadium: Rheinpark Stadion; Attendance: 800; Referee: Jouni Hyytiä (Finland)

10 December 2003 International Friendly	Slovakia	2–0	Kuwait	Larnaca, Cyprus
	Mário Breška 53'; Juraj Dovičovič 71'			Attendance: 200

==== 2004 ====
31 March 2004 International Friendly	Slovakia	1–1	Austria	Bratislava, Slovakia
18:30	Marek Mintál 72'		Roland Kollmann 90+1'	Stadium: Štadión Pasienky; Attendance: 5,420; Referee: ()

28 April 2004 International Friendly	Ukraine	1–1	Slovakia	Kyiv, Ukraine
	Oleg Venglinski 13'		Stanislav Varga 65'	Stadium: Valeriy Lobanovskyi Dynamo Stadium; Attendance: 16,800; Referee: Miroslaw Ryszka (Poland)

29 May 2004 International Friendly	Croatia	1–0	Slovakia	Rijeka, Croatia
19:15	Ivica Olić 29'			Stadium: Stadion Kantrida; Attendance: 5,500; Referee: Viktor Kassai (Hungary)

9 July 2004 2004 Kirin Cup; Match 1	Japan	3–1	Slovakia	Hiroshima, Japan
	Takashi Fukunishi 45'; Takayuki Suzuki 66'; Atsushi Yanagisawa 81'		Peter Babnič 65'	Stadium: Hiroshima Big Arch; Attendance: 34,458; Referee: Matthew Breeze (Australia)

11 July 2004 2004 Kirin Cup; Match 2	Serbia and Montenegro	2–0	Slovakia	Fukuoka, Japan
	Savo Milošević 6'; Nenad Jestrović 90'			Stadium: Hakata no Mori Stadium

18 August 2004 2006 FIFA World Cup; Qualifying Group 3	Slovakia	3–1	Luxembourg	Bratislava, Slovakia
20:15	Róbert Vittek 26'; Vratislav Greško 48'; Igor Demo 89'		Jeff Strasser 2'	Stadium: Tehelné pole Attendance: 5,016; Referee: Viktor Kassai (Hungary)

4 September 2004 2006 FIFA World Cup; Qualifying Group 3	Russia	1–1	Slovakia	Moscow, Russia
19:00	Dmitri Bulykin 14'		Róbert Vittek 87'	Stadium: Dynamo stadium Attendance: 11,500; Referee: Manuel Mejuto González (Spain)

8 September 2004 2006 FIFA World Cup; Qualifying Group 3	Slovakia	7–0	Liechtenstein	Bratislava, Slovakia
20:15	Róbert Vittek 15', 59', 81'; Miroslav Karhan 42'; Szilárd Németh 84'; Marek Mintál 85'; Radoslav Zabavník 90+2'			Stadium: Tehelné pole Attendance: 5,620; Referee: Dejan Delević (Serbia and Montenegro)

9 October 2004 2006 FIFA World Cup; Qualifying Group 3	Slovakia	4–1	Latvia	Bratislava, Slovakia
17:30	Szilárd Németh 46'; Ľubomír Reiter 50'; Miroslav Karhan 55', 87'		Māris Verpakovskis 3'	Stadium: Tehelné pole Attendance: 13,025; Referee: Stefano Farina (Italy)

17 November 2004 International Friendly	Slovakia	0–0	Slovenia	Trnava, Slovakia
				Stadium: Štadión Antona Malatinského; Attendance: 5,482; Referee: Tommy Skjerven (Norway)

30 November 2004 2004 King's Cup; Semi-final	Slovakia	1–0	Hungary	Bangkok, Thailand
16:15 UTC+7	Andrej Porázik 48'

1 December 2004 2004 King's Cup; Final	Slovakia	1–1	Thailand	Bangkok, Thailand
19:00 UTC+7	Martin Ďurica 67' (pen.)		Sakda Joemdee 13' (pen.)

==== 2005 ====
10 February 2005 International Friendly	Romania	2–2	Slovakia	Larnaka, Cyprus
	Daniel Pancu 39' (pen.); Daniel Oprița 90+'		Róbert Vittek 12'; Miroslav Karhan 44'	Stadium: Antonis Papadopoulos Stadium; Attendance: 500; Referee: Costas Kapitanis (Cyprus)

26 March 2005 2006 FIFA World Cup; Qualifying Group 3	Estonia	1–2	Slovakia	Tallinn, Estonia
18:00	Andres Oper 57'		Marek Mintál 58'; Ľubomír Reiter 65'	Stadium: A. Le Coq Arena; Attendance: 3,051; Referee: Peter Fröjdfeldt (Sweden)

30 March 2005 2006 FIFA World Cup; Qualifying Group 3	Slovakia	1–1	Portugal	Bratislava, Slovakia
19:00	Miroslav Karhan 8' (pen.)		Hélder Postiga 62'	Stadium: Tehelné pole Attendance: 21,000; Referee: Alain Sars (France)

4 June 2005 2006 FIFA World Cup; Qualifying Group 3	Portugal	2–0	Slovakia	Lisbon, Portugal
19:45	Fernando Meira 21'; Cristiano Ronaldo 42'			Stadium: Estádio da Luz; Attendance: 64,000; Referee: Pierluigi Collina (Italy)

8 June 2005 2006 FIFA World Cup; Qualifying Group 3	Luxembourg	0–4	Slovakia	Luxembourg, Luxembourg
20:00			Szilárd Németh 5'; Marek Mintál 15'; Karol Kisel 54'; Ľubomír Reiter 60'	Stadium: Stade Josy Barthel; Attendance: 2,108; Referee: Rob Styles (England)

17 August 2005 2006 FIFA World Cup; Qualifying Group 3	Liechtenstein	0–0	Slovakia	Vaduz, Liechtenstein
20:15				Stadium: Rheinpark Stadion; Attendance: 1,150; Referee: Bertrand Layec (France)

3 September 2005 International Friendly	Slovakia	2–0	Germany	Bratislava, Slovakia
	Miroslav Karhan 20' (pen.), 38'			Stadium: Tehelné pole Attendance: 9,276; Referee: Eric Braamhaar (Netherlands)

7 September 2005 2006 FIFA World Cup; Qualifying Group 3	Latvia	1–1	Slovakia	Riga, Latvia
19:00	Juris Laizāns 74'		Róbert Vittek 35'	Stadium: Skonto stadions Attendance: 8,800; Referee: Konrad Plautz (Austria)

8 October 2005 2006 FIFA World Cup; Qualifying Group 3	Slovakia	1–0	Estonia	Bratislava, Slovakia
17:00	Peter Hlinka 72'			Stadium: Tehelné pole Attendance: 12,800; Referee: Paul Allaerts (Belgium)

12 October 2005 2006 FIFA World Cup; Qualifying Group 3	Slovakia	0–0	Russia	Bratislava, Slovakia
20:30				Stadium: Tehelné pole Attendance: 22,317; Referee: Roberto Rosetti (Italy)

12 November 2005 2006 FIFA World Cup; Qualifying Play-off	Spain	5–1	Slovakia	Madrid, Spain
22:00	Luis Javier García Sanz 10', 18', 74'; Fernando Torres 65' (pen.); Fernando Morientes 79'		Szilárd Németh 49'; Marián Had (yellow card) 14' (yellow-red card) 63'	Stadium: Vicente Calderón Stadium; Attendance: 47,210; Referee: Massimo De Santis (Italy)

16 November 2005 2006 FIFA World Cup; Qualifying Play-off	Slovakia	1–1	Spain	Bratislava, Slovakia
20:15	Filip Hološko 50'		David Villa 71'	Stadium: Tehelné pole Attendance: 23,587; Referee: Markus Merk (Germany)

Spain won 6–2 on aggregate.

==== 2006 ====
1 March 2006 International Friendly	France	1–2	Slovakia	Saint-Denis, France
21:00	Sylvain Wiltord 73' (pen.)		Szilárd Németh 60'; Jozef Valachovič 80'	Stadium: Stade de France; Attendance: 56,273; Referee: Craig Thomson (Scotland)

20 May 2006 International Friendly	Slovakia	1–1	Belgium	Trnava, Slovakia
20:00	Filip Hološko 65'		Karel Geraerts 77'	Stadium: Štadión Antona Malatinského; Attendance: 3,000; Referee: Viktor Kassai (Hungary)

15 August 2006 International Friendly	Slovakia	3–0	Malta	Bratislava, Slovakia
	Filip Šebo 31', 75', 90'			Stadium: Tehelné Pole; Attendance: 2,437; Referee: Romāns Lajuks (Latvia)

2 September 2006 2008 UEFA Euro; Qualifying Group D	Slovakia	6–1	Cyprus	Bratislava, Slovakia
20:15	Martin Škrtel 9'; Marek Mintál 33', 55'; Filip Šebo 43', 48'; Miroslav Karhan 52'		Yiasoumis Yiasoumi 90'	Stadium: Tehelné Pole; Attendance: 4,783; Referee: Oleh Orekhov (Ukraine)

6 September 2006 2008 UEFA Euro; Qualifying Group D	Slovakia	0–3	Czech Republic	Bratislava, Slovakia
20:15			Libor Sionko 10', 21'; Jan Koller 57'	Stadium: Tehelné Pole; Attendance: 27,683; Referee: Steve Bennett (England)

7 October 2006 2008 UEFA Euro; Qualifying Group D	Wales	1–5	Slovakia	Cardiff, Wales
16:00	Gareth Bale 37'		Dusan Švento 14'; Marek Mintál 32', 38'; Miroslav Karhan 51'; Robert Vittek 59'	Stadium: Millennium Stadium; Attendance: 28,493; Referee: Dick van Egmond (Netherlands)

11 October 2006 2008 UEFA Euro; Qualifying Group D	Slovakia	1–4	Germany	Bratislava, Slovakia
20:45	Stanislav Varga 58'		Lukas Podolski 13', 72'; Michael Ballack 25'; Bastian Schweinsteiger 36'	Stadium: Tehelné Pole; Attendance: 21,582; Referee: Terje Hauge (Norway)

15 November 2006 International Friendly	Slovakia	3–1	Bulgaria	Žilina, Slovakia
17:30	Marek Mintál 8'; Marek Sapara 53'; Miroslav Karhan 78' (pen.)		Kalojan Karadžinov 80'	Stadium: Štadión Pod Dubňom; Attendance: 4,823; Referee: Jacek Granat (Poland)

10 December 2006 International Friendly	United Arab Emirates	1–2	Slovakia	Abu Dhabi, United Arab Emirates
	Ismail Matar 90+1' (pen.)		Michal Jonáš 50'; Ľubomír Michalík 53'	Stadium: Zayed Sports City Stadium; Attendance: 1,000; Referee: Abdul Hamid Ibrahím (Qatar)

==== 2007 ====
7 February 2007 International Friendly	Poland	2–2	Slovakia	Jerez de la Frontera, Spain
20:30	Michał Żewłakow 48'; Radosław Matusiak 79'		Martin Jakubko 1'; Martin Škrtel 45'	Stadium: Estadio Municipal de Chapín; Attendance: 200; Referee: Juan Perdigones (Spain)

24 March 2007 2008 UEFA Euro; Qualifying Group D	Cyprus	1–3	Slovakia	Nicosia, Cyprus
19:00	Efstathios Aloneftis 45'; Michalis Morfis (red card) 42'		Robert Vittek 54'; Martin Škrtel 67'; Martin Jakubko 77'	Stadium: Neo GSP Stadium; Attendance: 2,696; Referee: Gerald Lehner (Austria)

28 March 2007 2008 UEFA Euro; Qualifying Group D	Republic of Ireland	1–0	Slovakia	Dublin, Ireland
20:30	Kevin Doyle 12'			Stadium: Croke Park; Attendance: 71,297; Referee: Yuri Baskakov (Russia)

6 June 2007 2008 UEFA Euro; Qualifying Group D	Germany	2–1	Slovakia	Hamburg, Germany
20:30	Ján Ďurica 10' (o.g.); Thomas Hitzlsperger 43'		Christoph Metzelder 20' (o.g.)	Stadium: AOL Arena; Attendance: 51,500; Referee: Olegário Benquerença (Portugal)

22 August 2007 International Friendly	Slovakia	0–1	France	Trnava, Slovakia
21:00			Thierry Henry 38'	Stadium: Štadión Antona Malatinského; Attendance: 13,164; Referee: Igor Egorov (Russia)

8 September 2007 2008 UEFA Euro; Qualifying Group D	Slovakia	2–2	Republic of Ireland	Bratislava, Slovakia
20:30	Maroš Klimpl 37'; Marek Čech 90+1'		Stephen Ireland 7'; Kevin Doyle 57'	Stadium: Tehelné pole Attendance: 12,360; Referee: Stefano Farina (Italy)

12 September 2007 2008 UEFA Euro; Qualifying Group D	Slovakia	2–5	Wales	Trnava, Slovakia
18:30	Marek Mintál 12', 57'		Freddy Eastwood 22'; Craig Bellamy 34', 41'; Ján Ďurica 78' (o.g.); Simon Davies 90'	Stadium: Štadión Antona Malatinského; Attendance: 5,486; Referee: Laurent Duhamel (France)

13 October 2007 2008 UEFA Euro; Qualifying Group D	Slovakia	7–0	San Marino	Dubnica nad Váhom, Slovakia
15:00	Marek Hamšík 24'; Stanislav Šesták 32', 57'; Marek Sapara 37'; Martin Škrtel 51'; Filip Hološko 54'; Ján Ďurica 76' (pen.)			Stadium: Mestský štadión Attendance: 2,576; Referee: Luc Wilmes (Luxembourg)

16 October 2007 International Friendly	Croatia	3–0	Slovakia	Rijeka, Croatia
16:30	Ivica Olić 45', 69'; Ognjen Vukojević 48'			Stadium: Stadion Kantrida; Attendance: 6,000; Referee: Jérôme Laperrière (Switzerland)

17 November 2007 2008 UEFA Euro; Qualifying Group D	Czech Republic	3–1	Slovakia	Prague, Czech Republic
20:30	Zdeněk Grygera 13'; Marek Kulič 76'; Tomáš Rosický 83'		Michal Kadlec 79' (o.g.)	Stadium: AXA Arena; Attendance: 15,651; Referee: Tony Asumaa (Finland)

21 November 2007 2008 UEFA Euro; Qualifying Group D	San Marino	0–5	Slovakia	Serravalle, San Marino
20:30			Ľubomír Michalík 42'; Filip Hološko 51', 57'; Marek Hamšík 53'; Marek Čech 83'	Stadium: Stadio Olimpico; Attendance: 500; Referee: Andrejs Sipailo (Latvia)

==== 2008 ====
6 February 2008 International Friendly	Slovakia	1–1	Hungary	Limassol, Cyprus
18:00	Stanislav Šesták 64'		Zoltán Gera 54'	Stadium: Tsirion Stadium; Attendance: 100; Referee: Leontios Trattou (Cyprus)

26 March 2008 International Friendly	Slovakia	1–2	Iceland	Zlaté Moravce, Slovakia
20:15	Marek Mintál 87'		Gunnar Þorvaldsson 71'; Eiður Guðjohnsen 82'	Stadium: Štadión FC ViOn; Attendance: 4,120; Referee: Gerald Lehner (Austria)

20 May 2008 International Friendly	Turkey	1–0	Slovakia	Bielefeld, Germany
20:30	Hakan Balta 63'			Stadium: Schüco Arena; Attendance: 13,300; Referee: Michael Weiner (Germany)

24 May 2008 International Friendly	Switzerland	2–0	Slovakia	Lugano, Switzerland
18:00	Valon Behrami 56'; Alexander Frei 63'			Stadium: Cornaredo Stadium; Attendance: 10,150; Referee: Alan Kelly (Ireland)

20 August 2008 International Friendly	Slovakia	0–2	Greece	Bratislava, Slovakia
20:15			Theofanis Gekas 62', 86'	Stadium: Tehelné pole Attendance: 4,500; Referee: Fabian Mihaly (Hungary)

6 September 2008 2010 FIFA World Cup; Qualifying Group 3	Slovakia	2–1	Northern Ireland	Bratislava, Slovakia
17:30	Martin Škrtel 47'; Marek Hamšík 70'		Ján Ďurica 81' (o.g.)	Stadium: Tehelné pole Attendance: 5,445; Referee: Nikolai Ivanov (Russia)

10 September 2008 2010 FIFA World Cup; Qualifying Group 3	Slovenia	2–1	Slovakia	Maribor, Slovenia
20:45	Milivoje Novaković 22', 81'		Martin Jakubko 83'	Stadium: Ljudski vrt Attendance: 9,900; Referee: Svein Oddvar Moen (Norway)

11 October 2008 2010 FIFA World Cup; Qualifying Group 3	San Marino	1–3	Slovakia	Serravalle, San Marino
20:30	Andy Selva 45'		Stanislav Šesták 33'; Ján Kozák 39'; Miroslav Karhan 51'; Roman Kratochvíl (yellow card) 48' (yellow-red card) 73'	Stadium: Stadio Olimpico; Attendance: 1,037; Referee: Sascha Kever (Switzerland)

15 October 2008 2010 FIFA World Cup; Qualifying Group 3	Slovakia	2–1	Poland	Bratislava, Slovakia
20:30	Stanislav Šesták 85', 87'		Ebi Smolarek 70'	Stadium: Tehelné pole Attendance: 17,650; Referee: Bertrand Layec (France)

19 November 2008 International Friendly	Slovakia	4–0	Liechtenstein	Žilina, Slovakia
17:30	Marek Hamšík 43', 72'; Róbert Vittek 75'; Róbert Jež 90+'			Stadium: Štadión Pod Dubňom; Attendance: 2,010; Referee: Orechov (Ukraine)

==== 2009 ====
10 February 2009 Cyprus International; Football Tournament; Semi-Finals	Slovakia	2–3	Ukraine	Limassol, Cyprus
19:00	Róbert Vittek 42'; Marek Hamšík 69'		Sergey Valyaev 9'; Yevhen Seleznyov 48'; Artmem Milevskiy 83' (pen.)	Stadium: Tsirion Stadium; Attendance: 200; Referee: Panayiotis Kailis (Cyprus)

11 February 2009 Cyprus International; Football Tournament; 3rd Place Match	Cyprus	3–2	Slovakia	Nicosia, Cyprus
	Christakis Maragkos 32' (pen.); Marios Nicolaou 72'; Ioannis Okkas 82'		Róbert Jež 88'; Erik Jendrišek 90+'	Stadium: GSP Stadium; Attendance: 300; Referee: Pamborides (Cyprus)

28 March 2009 International Friendly	England	4–0	Slovakia	London, England
18:15	Emile Heskey 7'; Wayne Rooney 70', 90'; Frank Lampard 82'			Stadium: Wembley Stadium; Attendance: 85,512; Referee: Alain Hamer (Luxembourg)

1 April 2009 2010 FIFA World Cup; Qualifying Group 3	Czech Republic	1–2	Slovakia	Prague, Czech Republic
20:30	Marek Jankulovski 30'		Stanislav Šesták 22'; Erik Jendrišek 82'	Stadium: AXA Arena; Attendance: 14,956; Referee: Alberto Undiano Mallenco (Spain)

6 June 2009 2010 FIFA World Cup; Qualifying Group 3	Slovakia	7–0	San Marino	Bratislava, Slovakia
17:30	Marek Čech 3', 32'; Peter Pekarík 12'; Miroslav Stoch 35'; Ján Kozák 42'; Martin Jakubko 63'; Ľuboš Hanzel 68'			Stadium: Tehelné pole Attendance: 6,652; Referee: Jerome Efong (Belgium)

12 August 2009 International Friendly	Iceland	1–1	Slovakia	Reykjavík, Iceland
21:00	Kristján Sigurdsson 59'		Róbert Vittek 36'	Stadium: Laugardalsvöllur; Attendance: 5,099; Referee: Lars Christoffersen (Denmark)

5 September 2009 2010 FIFA World Cup; Qualifying Group 3	Slovakia	2–2	Czech Republic	Bratislava, Slovakia
20:30	Stanislav Šesták 59'; Marek Hamšík 73' (pen.) (yellow card) 74' (yellow-red card) 75'		Daniel Pudil 68'; Milan Baroš 83'	Stadium: Tehelné pole Attendance: 23,800; Referee: Tom Øvrebø (Norway)

9 September 2009 2010 FIFA World Cup; Qualifying Group 3	Northern Ireland	0–2	Slovakia	Belfast, Northern Ireland
19:45			Stanislav Šesták 15'; Filip Hološko 67'	Stadium: Windsor Park; Attendance: 13,019; Referee: Björn Kuipers (Netherlands)

10 October 2009 2010 FIFA World Cup; Qualifying Group 3	Slovakia	0–2	Slovenia	Bratislava, Slovakia
20:30			Valter Birsa 56'; Nejc Pečnik 90+3'	Stadium: Tehelné pole Attendance: 23,800; Referee: Wolfgang Stark (Germany)

14 October 2009 2010 FIFA World Cup; Qualifying Group 3	Poland	0–1	Slovakia	Chorzów, Poland
20:30			Seweryn Gancarczyk 3' (o.g.)	Stadium: Stadion Śląski; Attendance: 5,000; Referee: Jonas Eriksson (Sweden)

14 November 2009 International Friendly	Slovakia	1–0	United States	Bratislava, Slovakia
16:00	Marek Hamšík 26' (pen.)			Stadium: Tehelné Pole; Attendance: 7,200; Referee: Stefan Messner (Austria)

17 November 2009 International Friendly	Slovakia	1–2	Chile	Žilina, Slovakia
17:00	Stanislav Šesták 17'		Gonzalo Jara 8'; Esteban Paredes 55'	Stadium: Štadión Pod Dubňom; Attendance: 11,072; Referee: Istvan Vad (Hungary)

=== 2010s ===
==== 2010 ====
3 March 2010 International Friendly	Slovakia	0–1	Norway	Žilina, Slovakia
17:00			Morten Moldskred 67'	Stadium: Štadión Pod Dubňom; Attendance: 9,756; Referee: Bas Nijhuis (Netherlands)

29 May 2010 International Friendly	Slovakia	1–1	Cameroon	Klagenfurt, Austria
14:00	Kamil Kopúnek 6'		Eyong Enoh 84'	Stadium: Wörthersee Stadion; Attendance: 8,000; Referee: Harald Lechner (Austria)

5 June 2010 International Friendly	Slovakia	3–0	Costa Rica	Bratislava, Slovakia
17:00	Douglas Sequeira 16' (o.g.); Róbert Vittek 47'; Stanislav Šesták 88' (pen.)			Stadium: Štadión Pasienky; Attendance: 10,074; Referee: Stefan Messner (Austria)

15 June 2010 2010 FIFA World Cup; Group F	New Zealand	1–1	Slovakia	Rustenburg, South Africa
13:30	Winston Reid 90+3'		Róbert Vittek 50'	Stadium: Royal Bafokeng Stadium; Attendance: 23,871; Referee: Jerome Damon (South Africa)

20 June 2010 2010 FIFA World Cup; Group F	Slovakia	0–2	Paraguay	Bloemfontein, South Africa
13:30			Enrique Vera 27'; Cristian Riveros 86'	Stadium: Free State Stadium; Attendance: 26,643; Referee: Eddy Maillet (Seychelles)

24 June 2010 2010 FIFA World Cup; Group F	Slovakia	3–2	Italy	Johannesburg, South Africa
16:00	Róbert Vittek 25', 73'; Kamil Kopúnek 89'		Antonio Di Natale 81'; Fabio Quagliarella 90+2'	Stadium: Ellis Park Stadium; Attendance: 53,412; Referee: Howard Webb (England)

28 June 2010 2010 FIFA World Cup; Round of 16	Slovakia	1–2	Netherlands	Durban, South Africa
16:00	Róbert Vittek 90+4' (pen.)		Arjen Robben 18'; Wesley Sneijder 84'	Stadium: Durban Stadium; Attendance: 61,962; Referee: Alberto Undiano Mallenco (Spain)

11 August 2010 International Friendly	Slovakia	1–1	Croatia	Bratislava, Slovakia
20:30	Miroslav Stoch 50'		Nikica Jelavić 54'	Stadium: Štadión Pasienky; Attendance: 6,366; Referee: Radek Matejek (Czech Republic)

3 September 2010 2012 UEFA Euro; Qualifying Group B	Slovakia	1–0	Macedonia	Bratislava, Slovakia
20:30	Filip Hološko 90+1'		Vance Sikov (yellow card) 66' (yellow-red card) 85'	Stadium: Štadión Pasienky; Attendance: 5,980; Referee: Claudio Circhetta (Switzerland)

7 September 2010 2012 UEFA Euro; Qualifying Group B	Russia	0–1	Slovakia	Moscow, Russia
19:00			Miroslav Stoch 27'	Stadium: Lokomotiv Stadium; Attendance: 27,052; Referee: Frank De Bleeckere (Belgium)

8 October 2010 2012 UEFA Euro; Qualifying Group B	Armenia	3–1	Slovakia	Yerevan, Armenia
17:00	Yura Movsisyan 23'; Gevorg Ghazaryan 50'; Henrikh Mkhitaryan 89'		Vladimír Weiss 37'	Stadium: Republican Stadium; Attendance: 8,500; Referee: Daniele Orsato (Italy)

12 October 2010 2012 UEFA Euro; Qualifying Group B	Slovakia	1–1	Republic of Ireland	Žilina, Slovakia
20:30	Ján Ďurica 36'		Sean St Ledger 16'	Stadium: Štadión Pod Dubňom; Attendance: 10,892; Referee: Alberto Undiano Mallenco (Spain)

17 November 2010 International Friendly	Slovakia	2–3	Bosnia and Herzegovina	Bratislava, Slovakia
17:00	Filip Šebo 3'; Peter Grajciar 63'		Haris Medunjanin 28'; Miralem Pjanić 50'; Edin Džeko 60'	Stadium: Štadión Pasienky; Attendance: 7,822; Referee: Tomasz Mikulski (Poland)

==== 2011 ====
9 February 2011 International Friendly	Luxembourg	2–1	Slovakia	Luxembourg City, Luxembourg
20:15	Daniel Alves Da Mota 62', 82'		Erik Jendrišek 56'	Stadium: Stade Josy Barthel; Attendance: 862; Referee: Olivier Thual (France)

26 March 2011 2012 UEFA Euro; Qualifying Group B	Andorra	0–1	Slovakia	Andorra la Vella, Andorra
20:00			Filip Šebo 21'	Stadium: Estadi Comunal; Attendance: 850; Referee: Menashe Masiah (Israel)

29 March 2011 International Friendly	Slovakia	1–2	Denmark	Trnava, Slovakia
20:15	Filip Hološko 32'		Kornel Saláta 3' (o.g.); Michael Krohn-Dehli 72'	Stadium: Štadión Antona Malatinského; Attendance: 4,927; Referee: David Fernández (Spain)

4 June 2011 2012 UEFA Euro; Qualifying Group B	Slovakia	1–0	Andorra	Bratislava, Slovakia
20:15	Miroslav Karhan 63'			Stadium: Štadión Pasienky; Attendance: 4,300; Referee: Lorenc Jemini (Albania)

10 August 2011 International Friendly	Austria	1–2	Slovakia	Klagenfurt, Austria
20:30	Erwin Hoffer 62'		Juraj Kucka 21'; Róbert Jež 30'	Stadium: Wörthersee Stadion; Attendance: 13,000; Referee: Darko Čeferin (Slovenia)

2 September 2011 2012 UEFA Euro; Qualifying Group B	Republic of Ireland	0–0	Slovakia	Dublin, Ireland
20:45				Stadium: Aviva Stadium; Attendance: 35,480; Referee: Pedro Proença (Portugal)

6 September 2011 2012 UEFA Euro; Qualifying Group B	Slovakia	0–4	Armenia	Žilina, Slovakia
20:15			Yura Movsisyan 57'; Henrikh Mkhitaryan 70'; Gevorg Ghazaryan 80'; Artur Sarkisov 90+1'	Stadium: Štadión Pod Dubňom; Attendance: 7,238; Referee: Marcin Borski (Poland)

7 October 2011 2012 UEFA Euro; Qualifying Group B	Slovakia	0–1	Russia	Žilina, Slovakia
20:45			Alan Dzagoev 71'	Stadium: Štadión Pod Dubňom; Attendance: 10,087; Referee: Jonas Eriksson (Sweden)

11 October 2011 2012 UEFA Euro; Qualifying Group B	Macedonia	1–1	Slovakia	Skopje, Macedonia
19:45	Nikolce Noveski 79'		Juraj Piroska 54'	Stadium: Philip II Arena; Attendance: 4,100; Referee: Tony Chapron (France)

==== 2012 ====
29 February 2012 International Friendly	Turkey	1–2	Slovakia	Bursa, Turkey
19:30	Ömer Toprak 85'		Vladimír Weiss 24'; Miroslav Stoch 39'	Stadium: Bursa Atatürk Stadium; Attendance: 13,000; Referee: Thorsten Kinhöfer (Germany)

26 May 2012 International Friendly	Poland	1–0	Slovakia	Klagenfurt, Austria
17:00	Damien Perquis 30'			Stadium: Wörthersee Stadion; Attendance: 2,200; Referee: Rene Eisner (Austria)

30 May 2012 International Friendly	Netherlands	2–0	Slovakia	Rotterdam, Netherlands
20:30	Kornel Saláta 8' (o.g.); Rafael van der Vaart 75'			Stadium: Stadion Feijenoord; Attendance: 51,177; Referee: Vladislav Bezborodov (Russia)

15 August 2012 International Friendly	Denmark	1–3	Slovakia	Odense, Denmark
20:15	Tobias Mikkelsen 22'		Martin Jakubko 62'; Marek Hamšík 72'; Ľubomír Guldan 83'	Stadium: TRE-FOR Park; Attendance: 9,209; Referee: Daniel Stålhammar (Sweden)

7 September 2012 2014 FIFA World Cup; Qualifying Group G	Lithuania	1–1	Slovakia	Vilnius, Lithuania
20:15	Marius Žaliūkas 18'; Tadas Labukas (yellow card) 83' (yellow-red card) 90+6'		Marek Sapara 41'; Viktor Pečovský (red card) 55'	Stadium: LFF Stadium; Attendance: 4,000; Referee: Carlos Clos Gómez (Spain)

11 September 2012 2014 FIFA World Cup; Qualifying Group G	Slovakia	2–0	Liechtenstein	Bratislava, Slovakia
20:15	Marek Sapara 36'; Martin Jakubko 78'			Stadium: Štadión Pasienky; Attendance: 4,326; Referee: Simon Lee Evans (Wales)

12 October 2012 2014 FIFA World Cup; Qualifying Group G	Slovakia	2–1	Latvia	Bratislava, Slovakia
20:15	Marek Hamšík 6' (pen.); Marek Sapara 10'		Māris Verpakovskis 84' (pen.)	Stadium: Štadión Pasienky; Attendance: 4,012; Referee: Danny Makkelie (Netherlands)

16 October 2012 2014 FIFA World Cup; Qualifying Group G	Slovakia	0–1	Greece	Bratislava, Slovakia
20:30			Dimitris Salpingidis 63'	Stadium: Štadión Pasienky; Attendance: 7,694; Referee: William Collum (Scotland)

14 November 2012 International Friendly	Czech Republic	3–0	Slovakia	Olomouc, Czech Republic
17:20	David Lafata 3', 6'; Bořek Dočkal 72'			Stadium: Andrův stadion Attendance: 11,464; Referee: Harald Lechner (Austria)

==== 2013 ====
6 February 2013 International Friendly	Belgium	2–1	Slovakia	Bruges, Belgium
20:45	Eden Hazard 10' (pen.); Dries Mertens 90'		Richard Lásik 88'	Stadium: Jan Breydelstadion; Attendance: 22,000; Referee: Alon Yefet (Israel)

22 March 2013 2014 FIFA World Cup; Qualifying Group G	Slovakia	1–1	Lithuania	Žilina, Slovakia
20:10	Martin Jakubko 40'		Darvydas Šernas 19'	Stadium: Štadión pod Dubňom; Attendance: 4,560; Referee: Michael Oliver (England)

26 March 2013 International Friendly	Slovakia	0–0	Sweden	Žilina, Slovakia
20:15				Stadium: Štadión pod Dubňom; Attendance: 3,123; Referee: Gerhard Grobelnik (Austria)

7 June 2013 2014 FIFA World Cup; Qualifying Group G	Liechtenstein	1–1	Slovakia	Vaduz, Liechtenstein
20:00	Martin Büchel 13'		Ján Ďurica 73'	Stadium: Rheinpark; Attendance: 1,623; Referee: Martin Strömbergsson (Sweden)

14 August 2013 International Friendly	Romania	1–1	Slovakia	Bucharest, Romania
	Bogdan Stancu 44'		Stanislav Šesták 56'	Stadium: Arena Națională; Attendance: 6,738; Referee: Neil Doyle (Ireland)

6 September 2013 2014 FIFA World Cup; Qualifying Group G	Bosnia and Herzegovina	0–1	Slovakia	Zenica, Bosnia and Herzegovina
20:15			Viktor Pečovský 77'	Stadium: Bilino Polje; Attendance: 12,500; Referee: Nicola Rizzoli (Italy)

10 September 2013 2014 FIFA World Cup; Qualifying Group G	Slovakia	1–2	Bosnia and Herzegovina	Žilina, Slovakia
20:15	Marek Hamšík 42'		Ermin Bičakčić 70'; Izet Hajrović 78'	Stadium: Štadión Pod Dubňom; Attendance: 9,438; Referee: David Fernández Borbalán (Spain)

11 October 2013 2014 FIFA World Cup; Qualifying Group G	Greece	1–0	Slovakia	Piraeus, Greece
21:45	Martin Škrtel 44' (o.g.)		Martin Škrtel (red card) 90+'	Stadium: Karaiskakis Stadium; Attendance: 21,067; Referee: Deniz Aytekin (Germany)

15 October 2013 2014 FIFA World Cup; Qualifying Group G	Latvia	2–2	Slovakia	Riga, Latvia
21:10	Valērijs Šabala 47'; Renārs Rode 90+2'		Martin Jakubko 9'; Kornel Saláta 16'	Stadium: Skonto Stadium; Attendance: 3,813; Referee: Yevhen Aranovskiy (Ukraine)

15 November 2013 International Friendly	Poland	0–2	Slovakia	Wrocław, Poland
20:45			Juraj Kucka 31'; Róbert Mak 39'	Stadium: Stadion Miejski; Attendance: 40,605; Referee: Marco Borg (Malta)

19 November 2013 International Friendly	Gibraltar	0–0	Slovakia	Algarve (Faro/Loulé), Portugal
19:30				Stadium: Estádio Algarve; Attendance: 350; Referee: Hugo Miguel (Portugal)

Notes

1. The Gibraltar vs Slovakia match was moved to the Estádio Algarve, Faro/Loulé, Portugal due to the Victoria Stadium not meeting UEFA standards for international matches.

==== 2014 ====
5 March 2014 International Friendly	Israel	1–3	Slovakia	Netanya, Israel
	Maor Buzaglo 80'		Martin Jakubko 37'; Ján Ďurica 69'; Róbert Mak 83'	Stadium: Netanya Stadium; Attendance: 6,500; Referee: Christian Dingert (Germany)

23 May 2014 International Friendly	Slovakia	2–0	Montenegro	Senec, Slovakia
20:20	Vladimír Weiss 45+1'; Erik Jendrišek 85'			Stadium: NTC Senec; Attendance: 2,587; Referee: Bartosz Frankowski (Poland)

26 May 2014 International Friendly	Russia	1–0	Slovakia	Saint Petersburg, Russia
	Alexander Kerzhakov 82'			Stadium: Petrovsky Stadium; Attendance: 11,000; Referee: Mark Clattenburg (England)

4 September 2014 International Friendly	Slovakia	1–0	Malta	Žilina, Slovakia
18:20	Adam Nemec 43'			Stadium: Štadión pod Dubňom; Attendance: 3,509; Referee: Miroslav Zelinka (Czech Republic)

8 September 2014 2016 UEFA Euro; Qualifying Group C	Ukraine	0–1	Slovakia	Kyiv, Ukraine
20:45			Róbert Mak 17'	Stadium: Olympic Stadium; Attendance: 38,454; Referee: Craig Thomson (Scotland)

9 October 2014 2016 UEFA Euro; Qualifying Group C	Slovakia	2–1	Spain	Žilina, Slovakia
20:45	Juraj Kucka 17'; Miroslav Stoch 87'		Paco Alcácer 82'	Stadium: Štadión pod Dubňom; Attendance: 9,478; Referee: Björn Kuipers (Netherlands)

12 October 2014 2016 UEFA Euro; Qualifying Group C	Belarus	1–3	Slovakia	Barysaw, Belarus
20:45	Tsimafey Kalachow 79'		Marek Hamšík 65', 84'; Stanislav Šesták 90+1'	Stadium: Borisov Arena; Attendance: 4,500; Referee: Serge Gumienny (Belgium)

15 November 2014 2016 UEFA Euro; Qualifying Group C	Macedonia	0–2	Slovakia	Skopje, Macedonia
20:45		Report	Juraj Kucka 25'; Adam Nemec 38'	Stadium: Philip II Arena; Attendance: 6,000; Referee: Pedro Proença (Portugal)

18 November 2014 International Friendly	Slovakia	2–1	Finland	Žilina, Slovakia
18:20	Filip Hološko 1'; Marek Hamšík 7'		Tomáš Hubočan 45' (o.g.)	Stadium: Štadión pod Dubňom; Attendance: 3,998; Referee: Markus Hameter

==== 2015 ====
27 March 2015 2016 UEFA Euro; Qualifying Group C	Slovakia	3–0	Luxembourg	Žilina, Slovakia
20:45	Adam Nemec 10'; Vladimír Weiss 21'; Peter Pekarík 40'	Report		Stadium: Štadión pod Dubňom; Attendance: 9,524; Referee: Stephan Studer (Switzerland)

31 March 2015 International Friendly	Slovakia	1–0	Czech Republic	Žilina, Slovakia
20:30	Ondrej Duda 49'			Stadium: Štadión pod Dubňom; Attendance: 10,594; Referee: István Vad (Hungary)

14 June 2015 2016 UEFA Euro; Qualifying Group C	Slovakia	2–1	Macedonia	Žilina, Slovakia
20:45	Kornel Saláta 8'; Marek Hamšík 38'	Report	Arijan Ademi 69'	Stadium: Štadión pod Dubňom; Attendance: 10,765; Referee: Kenn Hansen (Denmark)

5 September 2015 2016 UEFA Euro; Qualifying Group C	Spain	2–0	Slovakia	Oviedo, Spain
20:45	Jordi Alba 5'; Andrés Iniesta 30' (pen.)	Report		Stadium: Estadio Carlos Tartiere; Attendance: 20,000; Referee: Damir Skomina (Slovenia)

8 September 2015 2016 UEFA Euro; Qualifying Group C	Slovakia	0–0	Ukraine	Žilina, Slovakia
20:45		Report		Stadium: Štadión Pod Dubňom; Attendance: 10,648; Referee: Martin Atkinson (England)

9 October 2015 2016 UEFA Euro; Qualifying Group C	Slovakia	0–1	Belarus	Žilina, Slovakia
20:45		Report	Stanislav Dragun 34'	Stadium: Štadión pod Dubňom; Attendance: 9,859; Referee: Hüseyin Göçek (Turkey)

12 October 2015 2016 UEFA Euro; Qualifying Group C	Luxembourg	2–4	Slovakia	Luxembourg, Luxembourg
20:45	Mario Mutsch 61'; Lars Gerson 65' (pen.)	Report	Marek Hamšík 24', 90+5'; Adam Nemec 29'; Róbert Mak 30'	Stadium: Stade Josy Barthel; Attendance: 2,512; Referee: Oliver Drachta (Austria)

13 November 2015 International Friendly	Slovakia	3–2	Switzerland	Trnava, Slovakia
20:45	Michal Ďuriš 39', 48'; Róbert Mak 55'		Eren Derdiyok 63'; Josip Drmić 67'	Stadium: Štadión Antona Malatinského; Attendance: 17,582; Referee: Miroslav Zelinka (Czech Republic)

17 November 2015 International Friendly	Slovakia	3–1	Iceland	Žilina, Slovakia
20:45	Róbert Mak 58', 61'; Michal Ďuriš 84'		Alfred Finnbogason 8'	Stadium: Štadión pod Dubňom; Attendance: 5,568; Referee: Pawel Raczkowski (Poland)

==== 2016 ====
25 March 2016 International Friendly	Slovakia	0–0	Latvia	Trnava, Slovakia
20:30				Stadium: Štadión Antona Malatinského; Attendance: 12,405; Referee: Harald Lechner (Austria)

29 March 2016 International Friendly	Republic of Ireland	2–2	Slovakia	Dublin, Ireland
20:45	Shane Long 22' (pen.); James McClean 24' (pen.)		Miroslav Stoch 14'; Paul McShane 45' (o.g.)	Stadium: Aviva Stadium; Attendance: 30,217; Referee: Ola Hobber Nilsen (Norway)

27 May 2016 International Friendly	Slovakia	3–1	Georgia	Wels, Austria
17:30	Adam Nemec 5', 56'; Adam Zreľák 70'		Levan Kenia 71'	Stadium: Renner-Arena; Attendance: 782; Referee: Oliver Drachta (Austria)

29 May 2016 International Friendly	Germany	1–3	Slovakia	Augsburg, Germany
17:45	Mario Gómez 13' (pen.)		Marek Hamšík 41'; Michal Ďuriš 44'; Juraj Kucka 52'	Stadium: WWK ARENA; Attendance: 22,110; Referee: Serge Gumienny (Belgium)

4 June 2016 International Friendly	Slovakia	0–0	Northern Ireland	Trnava, Slovakia
20:45				Stadium: Štadión Antona Malatinského; Attendance: 18,111; Referee: Radu Petrescu (Romania)

11 June 2016 2016 UEFA Euro Group B	Wales	2–1	Slovakia	Bordeaux, France
18:00	Gareth Bale 10'; Hal Robson-Kanu 81'		Ondrej Duda 61'	Stadium: Nouveau Stade de Bordeaux; Attendance: 37,831; Referee: Svein Oddvar Moen (Norway)

15 June 2016 2016 UEFA Euro Group B	Russia	1–2	Slovakia	Lille, France
15:00	Denis Glushakov 80'		Vladimír Weiss 32'; Marek Hamšík 45'	Stadium: Stade Pierre-Mauroy; Attendance: 38,989; Referee: Damir Skomina (Slovenia)

20 June 2016 2016 UEFA Euro Group B	Slovakia	0–0	England	Saint-Étienne, France
21:00				Stadium: Stade Geoffroy-Guichard; Attendance: 39,051; Referee: Carlos Velasco Carballo (Spain)

26 June 2016 2016 UEFA Euro Round of 16	Germany	3–0	Slovakia	Lille, France
18:00	Boateng 8'; Gómez 43'; Draxler 63'			Stadium: Stade Pierre-Mauroy; Attendance: 44,312; Referee: Szymon Marciniak (Poland)

4 September 2016 2018 FIFA World Cup; Qualifying Group F	Slovakia	0–1	England	Trnava, Slovakia
18:00			Lallana 90+5'	Stadium: Štadión Antona Malatinského; Attendance: 18,111; Referee: Milorad Mažić (Serbia)

8 October 2016 2018 FIFA World Cup; Qualifying Group F	Slovenia	1–0	Slovakia	Ljubljana, Slovenia
20:45	Kronaveter 74'			Stadium: Stadion Stožice; Attendance: 10,492; Referee: Nicola Rizzoli (Italy)

11 October 2016 2018 FIFA World Cup; Qualifying Group F	Slovakia	3–0	Scotland	Trnava, Slovakia
20:45	Róbert Mak 18', 56'; Adam Nemec 68'			Stadium: Štadión Antona Malatinského; Attendance: 11,098; Referee: Martin Strömbergsson (Sweden)

11 November 2016 2018 FIFA World Cup; Qualifying Group F	Slovakia	4–0	Lithuania	Trnava, Slovakia
20:45	Adam Nemec 12'; Juraj Kucka 15'; Martin Škrtel 36'; Marek Hamšík 86'			Stadium: Štadión Antona Malatinského; Attendance: 9,653; Referee: Tasos Sidiropoulos (Greece)

15 November 2016 International Friendly	Austria	0–0	Slovakia	Vienna, Austria
20:45				Stadium: Ernst-Happel-Stadion; Attendance: 14,200; Referee: Kevin Blom (Netherlands)

==== 2017 ====
8 January 2017 International Friendly	Slovakia	1–3	Uganda	Abu Dhabi, UAE
16:30	Denis Vavro 57'		Moses Oloya 6'; Farouk Miya 14'; Geoffrey Massa 77'	Stadium: Armed Forces Stadium; Attendance: 4,000; Referee: Sultan Al-Marzooqi (United Arab Emirates)

12 January 2017 International Friendly	Sweden	6–0	Slovakia	Abu Dhabi, UAE
16:35	Alexander Isak 21'; David Moberg Karlsson 51'; Sebastian Andersson 59'; Sebastian Andersson 79'; Per Frick 89'; Saman Ghoddos 90+2'			Stadium: Zayed Sport Stadium; Referee: Eaasa Abdulaah Hasan (United Arab Emirates

26 March 2017 2018 FIFA World Cup; Qualifying Group F	Malta	1–3	Slovakia	Ta'Qali, Malta
20:45	Jean Paul Farrugia 14'		Vladimír Weiss 2'; Ján Greguš 41'; Adam Nemec 84'	Stadium: Ta' Qali National Stadium; Attendance: 4,980; Referee: Ali Palabıyık (Turkey)

10 June 2017 2018 FIFA World Cup; Qualifying Group F	Lithuania	1–2	Slovakia	Vilnius, Lithuania
20:45	Arvydas Novikovas 90+3'		Vladimír Weiss 32'; Marek Hamšík 58'	Stadium: LFF Stadium; Attendance: 4,083; Referee: Manuel Gräfe (Germany)

1 September 2017 2018 FIFA World Cup; Qualifying Group F	Slovakia	1–0	Slovenia	Trnava, Slovakia
20:45	Miha Mevlja (o.g) 81'			Stadium: Štadión Antona Malatinského; Attendance: 16,896; Referee: Antonio Mateu Lahoz (Spain)

4 September 2017 2018 FIFA World Cup; Qualifying Group F	England	2–1	Slovakia	London, England
20:45	Eric Dier 37'; Marcus Rashford 59'		Stanislav Lobotka 3'	Stadium: Wembley Stadium; Attendance: 67,283; Referee: Clément Turpin (France)

5 October 2017 2018 FIFA World Cup; Qualifying Group F	Scotland	1–0	Slovakia	Glasgow, Scotland
20:45	Martin Škrtel (o.g) 89'			Stadium: Hampden Park; Attendance: 46,800; Referee: Milorad Mažić (Serbia)

8 October 2017 2018 FIFA World Cup; Qualifying Group F	Slovakia	3–0	Malta	Trnava, Slovakia
18:00	Adam Nemec 33', 62'; Ondrej Duda 69'			Stadium: Štadión Antona Malatinského; Attendance: 17,774; Referee: Paolo Mazzoleni (Italy)

10 November 2017 International Friendly	Ukraine	2–1	Slovakia	Lviv, Ukraine
19:00	Andriy Yarmolenko 33'; Yevhen Konoplyanka 69'	Report	Lukáš Štetina 10'	Stadium: Arena Lviv; Attendance: 27,000; Referee: Andris Treimanis (Latvia)

14 November 2017 International Friendly	Slovakia	1–0	Norway	Trnava, Slovakia
18:00	Stanislav Lobotka 90+3'	Report		Stadium: Štadión Antona Malatinského; Attendance: 6,415; Referee: Ádám Farkas (Hungary)

==== 2018 ====
22 March 2018 2018 King's Cup	Slovakia	2–1	United Arab Emirates	Bangkok, Thailand
16:30	Albert Rusnák 42'; Michal Ďuriš 45+3'	Report	Ahmed Khalil 73'	Stadium: Rajamangala National Stadium; Attendance: 8,630; Referee: Letchman Gopala Krishnan (Singapore)

25 March 2018 2018 King's Cup	Thailand	2–3	Slovakia	Bangkok, Thailand
19:30	Jakkaphan Kaewprom 42'; Pansa Hemviboon 34'	Report	Ondrej Duda 10'; Róbert Mak 34'; Erik Pačinda 68'	Stadium: Rajamangala National Stadium; Attendance: 45,425; Referee: Suhaizi Shukri (Malaysia)

31 May 2018 International Friendly	Slovakia	1–1	Netherlands	Trnava, Slovakia
20:45	Adam Nemec 8'	Report	Quincy Promes 59'	Stadium: Štadión Antona Malatinského; Attendance: 15,432; Referee: Bartosz Frankowski (Poland)

4 June 2018 International Friendly	Slovakia	1–2	Morocco	Geneva, Switzerland
20:00	Ján Greguš 59'	Report	Ayoub El Kaabi 64'; Younès Belhanda 74'	Stadium: Stade de Genève; Attendance: 7,000; Referee: Lionel Tschudi (Switzerland)

5 September 2018 International Friendly	Slovakia	3–0	Denmark	Trnava, Slovakia
20:45	Adam Nemec 11'; Albert Rusnák 37'; Adam Fogt 79' (o.g.)	Report		Stadium: Štadión Antona Malatinského; Attendance: 6,432; Referee: Julian Weinberger (Austria)

9 September 2018 2018–19 UEFA Nations League	Ukraine	1–0	Slovakia	Lviv, Ukraine
15:00	Andriy Yarmolenko 80' (pen.)	Report		Stadium: Arena Lviv; Attendance: 0 Referee: Anastasios Sidiropoulos (Greece)

13 October 2018 2018–19 UEFA Nations League	Slovakia	1–2	Czech Republic	Trnava, Slovakia
15:00	Marek Hamšík 62'	Report	Michael Krmenčík 52'; Patrik Schick 76'	Stadium: Štadión Antona Malatinského; Attendance: 17,251; Referee: Slavko Vinčić (Slovenia)

16 October 2018 International Friendly	Sweden	1–1	Slovakia	Solna, Sweden
20:45	John Guidetti 52'	Report	Albert Rusnák 84'	Stadium: Friends Arena; Attendance: 9,876; Referee: Jakob Kehlet (Denmark)

16 November 2018 2018–19 UEFA Nations League	Slovakia	4–1	Ukraine	Trnava, Slovakia
20:45	Albert Rusnák 6'; Juraj Kucka 26'; Adam Zreľák 52'; Róbert Mak 61'	Report	Yevhen Konoplyanka 47'	Stadium: Štadión Antona Malatinského; Attendance: 9,764; Referee: Nikola Dabanović (Montenegro)

19 November 2018 2018–19 UEFA Nations League	Czech Republic	1–0	Slovakia	Prague, Czech Republic
20:45	Patrik Schick 32'	Report		Stadium: Eden Arena; Attendance: 16,623; Referee: Alejandro Hernández Hernández (Spain)

==== 2019 ====
21 March 2019 UEFA Euro 2020 qualifying	Slovakia	2–0	Hungary	Trnava, Slovakia
20:45	Ondrej Duda 42'; Albert Rusnák 85'	Report		Stadium: Štadión Antona Malatinského; Attendance: 14,235; Referee: Vladislav Bezborodov (Russia)

24 March 2019 UEFA Euro 2020 qualifying	Wales	1–0	Slovakia	Cardiff, Wales
15:00	Daniel James 5'	Report		Stadium: Cardiff City Stadium; Attendance: 31,617; Referee: Felix Zwayer (Germany)

7 June 2019 International Friendly	Slovakia	5–1	Jordan	Trnava, Slovakia
20:30	Lukáš Haraslín 50'; Martin Chrien 55'; Ján Greguš 71' (pen.); Samuel Mráz 74'; Jaroslav Mihalík 84'	Report	Musa Al-Taamari 39'	Stadium: Štadión Antona Malatinského; Attendance: 3,454; Referee: Tomasz Musial (Poland)

11 June 2019 UEFA Euro 2020 qualifying	Azerbaijan	1–5	Slovakia	Baku, Azerbaijan
18:00	Ramil Sheydayev 29'	Report	Stanislav Lobotka 8'; Juraj Kucka 27'; Marek Hamšík 30', 57'; Dávid Hancko 85'	Stadium: Bakcell Arena; Attendance: 6,000; Referee: John Beaton (Scotland)

6 September 2019 UEFA Euro 2020 qualifying	Slovakia	0–4	Croatia	Trnava, Slovakia
20:45		Report	Nikola Vlašić 45'; Ivan Perišić 47'; Bruno Petković 72'; Dejan Lovren 89'	Stadium: Štadión Antona Malatinského; Attendance: 18,098; Referee: Felix Brych (Germany)

9 September 2019 UEFA Euro 2020 qualifying	Hungary	1–2	Slovakia	Budapest, Hungary
20:45	Dominik Szoboszlai 50'	Report	Róbert Mak 40'; Róbert Boženík 56'	Stadium: Groupama Arena; Attendance: 21,700; Referee: Antonio Mateu Lahoz (Spain)

10 October 2019 UEFA Euro 2020 qualifying	Slovakia	1–1	Wales	Trnava, Slovakia
20:45	Juraj Kucka 53'	Report	Kieffer Moore 25'	Stadium: Štadión Antona Malatinského; Attendance: 18,071; Referee: Carlos del Cerro Grande (Spain)

13 October 2019 International Friendly	Slovakia	1–1	Paraguay	Bratislava, Slovakia
20:45	Róbert Boženík 59'	Report	Kaku 85'	Stadium: Tehelné pole Attendance: 6,669; Referee: Slavko Vinčić (Slovenia)

16 November 2019 UEFA Euro 2020 qualifying	Croatia	3–1	Slovakia	Rijeka, Croatia
20:45	Nikola Vlašić 56'; Bruno Petković 60'; Ivan Perišić 74'	Report	Róbert Boženík 32'	Stadium: Stadion Rujevica; Referee: Clément Turpin (France)

19 November 2019 UEFA Euro 2020 qualifying	Slovakia	2–0	Azerbaijan	Trnava, Slovakia
20:45	Róbert Boženík 19'; Marek Hamšík 86'	Report		Stadium: Anton Malatinský Stadium; Referee: Serhiy Boyko (Ukraine)

== Record ==
All statistics are correct as of 6 October 2026.

=== By competition ===
Competition	Pld	W	D	L	GF	GA	GD	Win%	PPG
FIFA World Cup	4	1	1	2	5	7	−2	25.00	1
FIFA World Cup qualification	83	41	19	23	139	86	+53	49.39	1.71
UEFA European Championship	11	3	2	6	9	18	-9	27.27	1
UEFA European Championship qualification	80	40	13	27	126	97	+29	50.00	1.66
UEFA Nations League	30	11	6	13	34	30	+4	36.67	1.24
International Friendlies	152	50	44	58	193	217	-24	33.89	1.28
Minor tournaments	29	12	4	13	36	36	0	41.38	1.38
Totals	389	158	89	142	542	491	+51	40.61	1.44

=== By nation ===
Positive Record Neutral Record Negative Record

Opponents	Pld	W	D	L	GF	GA	GD
Algeria	1	0	1	0	1	1	0
Andorra	2	2	0	0	2	0	+2
Argentina	1	0	0	1	0	6	−6
Armenia	2	0	0	2	1	7	−6
Australia	1	0	1	0	0	0	0
Austria	6	1	3	2	3	6	−3
Azerbaijan	12	10	0	2	26	8	+18
Bahrain	1	0	0	1	0	2	−2
Belarus	5	3	1	1	9	3	+6
Belgium	4	1	2	1	4	4	0
Bolivia	3	2	0	1	3	2	+1
Bosnia and Herzegovina	6	3	0	3	8	7	+1
Brazil	1	0	0	1	0	5	−5
Bulgaria	8	4	2	2	11	6	+5
Cameroon	1	0	1	0	1	1	0
Chile	3	1	1	1	5	4	+1
China	1	1	0	0	3	2	+1
Colombia	3	0	1	2	0	2	−2
Costa Rica	3	1	1	1	5	6	−1
Croatia	17	2	4	11	20	43	-23
Cyprus	6	4	1	1	16	6	+10
Czech Republic	14	3	2	9	12	29	−17
Denmark	3	2	0	1	7	3	+4
Egypt	1	0	0	1	0	1	−1
England	7	0	1	6	4	13	−9
Estonia	4	4	0	0	5	1	+4
Faroe Islands	3	2	1	0	6	2	+4
Finland	4	3	1	0	6	1	+5
France	4	1	1	2	2	6	−4
Georgia	2	1	0	1	3	3	0
Germany	13	4	0	9	14	31	−17
Gibraltar	1	0	1	0	0	0	0
Greece	6	1	1	4	5	10	−5
Guatemala	1	1	0	0	1	0	+1
Hungary	6	4	2	0	7	2	+5
Iceland	7	5	1	1	16	9	+7
Iran	2	1	0	1	6	6	0
Republic of Ireland	6	0	5	1	5	6	−1
Israel	7	3	2	2	10	8	+2
Italy	2	1	0	1	3	5	−2
Japan	3	0	1	2	2	5	−3
Jordan	1	1	0	0	5	1	+4
Kazakhstan	3	1	0	2	3	4	−1
Kosovo	1	0	0	1	3	4	−1
Kuwait	1	1	0	0	2	0	+2
Latvia	6	3	3	0	12	6	+6
Lebanon	1	0	0	1	1	2	-1
Liechtenstein	11	9	2	0	30	1	+29
Lithuania	6	3	3	0	11	5	+6
Luxembourg	9	7	1	1	19	5	+14
Malaysia	1	1	0	0	2	0	+2
Malta	11	9	2	0	31	6	+25
Mexico	1	0	0	1	2	5	−3
Moldova	5	4	0	1	11	4	+7
Montenegro	3	1	2	0	6	4	+2
Morocco	2	0	0	2	2	4	−2
Netherlands	3	0	1	2	2	5	−3
New Zealand	1	0	1	0	1	1	0
Northern Ireland	7	4	1	2	7	5	+2
North Macedonia	8	6	2	0	16	3	+13
Norway	5	1	1	3	2	6	−4
Paraguay	2	0	1	1	1	3	−2
Peru	2	0	0	2	1	3	−2
Poland	9	5	1	3	14	14	0
Portugal	6	0	1	5	3	11	−8
Romania	13	2	6	5	15	21	−6
Russia	11	4	3	4	10	10	0
San Marino	5	5	0	0	26	1	+25
Saudi Arabia	1	0	1	0	1	1	0
Scotland	4	2	0	2	4	2	+2
Serbia and Montenegro (Note: Includes matches against FR Yugoslavia.)	3	0	1	2	1	5	−4
Slovenia	13	2	6	5	8	11	−3
South Korea	1	0	1	0	0	0	0
Spain	7	1	1	5	6	20	−14
Sweden	9	0	4	5	5	16	−11
Switzerland	3	2	0	1	4	4	0
Thailand	2	1	1	0	4	3	+1
Turkey	6	1	1	4	3	8	−5
Uganda	1	0	0	1	1	3	−2
Ukraine	9	2	3	4	11	11	0
United Arab Emirates	3	3	0	0	5	2	+3
United States	1	1	0	0	1	0	+1
Uzbekistan	1	1	0	0	4	1	+3
Wales	6	2	1	3	13	10	+3
Total	383	155	88	140	537	488	+49

=== By confederation ===
Competition	Pld	W	D	L	GF	GA	GD	Win%	PPG
UEFA	339	141	76	122	481	421	+60	41.59	1.47
AFC	19	10	4	5	35	25	+10	52.63	1.79
CONMEBOL	15	3	3	9	8	23	-15	20.00	0.8
CONCACAF	6	3	1	2	9	11	-2	50.00	1.67
CAF	6	0	2	4	5	10	-5	0.00	0.33
OFC	2	0	2	0	1	1	0	0.00	1
Totals	387	156	89	142	539	491	+48	40.31	1.44

Notes

Although Australia is now a member state of AFC, at the time of a match between Slovakia v. Australia, Australia competed as a member state of the OFC.

=== By year ===
Year	Pld	W	D	L	GF	GA	GD	Win%	PPG
1939	2	1	0	1	3	3	0	50.00	1.50
1940	2	1	0	1	4	2	+2	50.00	1.50
1941	4	0	1	3	5	13	–8	0.00	0.25
1942	4	1	0	3	5	13	–8	25.00	0.75
1943	3	0	1	2	3	6	–3	0.00	0.33
1944	1	0	0	1	3	7	–4	0.00	0.00
1992	2	2	0	0	4	2	+2	100.00	3.00
1993	2	1	1	0	4	2	+2	50.00	2.00
1994	10	3	3	4	14	13	+1	30.00	1.20
1995	13	5	1	7	14	29	–15	38.46	1.23
1996	9	4	1	4	19	14	+5	44.44	1.44
1997	12	6	2	4	14	13	+1	50.00	1.67
1998	12	5	3	4	15	13	+2	41.67	1.50
1999	14	6	2	6	10	15	−5	42.86	1.43
2000	16	6	6	4	16	12	+4	37.50	1.50
2001	14	4	3	7	19	19	0	28.57	1.07
2002	9	2	2	5	11	17	−6	22.22	0.89
2003	11	5	3	3	18	9	+9	45.45	1.64
2004	12	4	5	3	20	12	+8	33.33	1.42
2005	12	4	6	2	15	13	+2	33.33	1.50
2006	9	6	1	2	23	13	+10	66.67	2.11
2007	11	3	2	6	23	20	+3	27.27	1.00
2008	10	4	1	5	14	13	+1	40.00	1.30
2009	12	5	2	5	21	18	+3	41.67	1.42
2010	13	4	4	5	16	17	−1	30.77	1.23
2011	9	3	2	4	7	11	−4	33.33	1.22
2012	9	4	1	4	10	11	−1	44.44	1.44
2013	11	2	6	3	10	10	0	18.18	1.09
2014	9	8	0	1	16	5	+11	88.89	2.67
2015	9	6	1	2	16	9	+7	66.67	2.11
2016	14	5	5	4	18	12	+6	35.71	1.43
2017	10	5	0	5	13	16	-3	50.00	1.50
2018	10	4	2	4	16	12	+4	40.00	1.40
2019	10	5	2	3	19	13	+6	50.00	1.70
2020	8	2	2	4	7	11	-4	25.00	0.75
2021	15	4	7	4	18	16	+2	26.67	1.27
2022	10	3	3	4	9	10	-1	30.00	1.20
2023	10	7	1	2	17	8	+9	70.00	2.20
2024	14	7	3	4	23	13	+10	50.00	1.71
2025	10	4	1	5	7	14	–7	40.00	1.30
2026	8	5	2	1	18	9	+9	62.50	2.13
Totals	387	156	89	142	539	491	+48	40.31	1.44

=== By location ===
Location	Pld	W	D	L	GF	GA	GD	Win%	PPG
Home	162	78	44	40	273	161	+112	48.14	1.71
Away	170	62	32	76	211	260	-37	36.47	1.28
Neutral	53	16	13	24	56	68	-12	30.19	1.06
Totals	385	156	89	140	539	491	+48	40.36	1.45

== See also ==
- Slovakia national football team
