= List of Slovakia international footballers =

This list of Slovakia international footballers comprises all players to have represented the Slovakia national football team. The team first played in an international match on 27 August 1939, soon after the formation of the first Slovak Republic. The team played some matches during the World War II, after which it was joined within the Czechoslovakia national team. Although Slovakia became an independent state again in 1993 following the dissolution of Czechoslovakia, during the 1994 FIFA World Cup qualification, the Czech Republic and Slovakia team still competed as one. Slovakia began competing in international football again in 1994 has since qualified for the 2010 FIFA World Cup, UEFA Euro 2016, UEFA Euro 2020, and UEFA Euro 2024.

== List of players ==
Key

*	Still active for the national team
Caps	Appearances

Pos	Positions
GK	Goalkeeper
DF	Defender
MF	Midfielder
FW	Forward

Player	Pos	Caps	Goals	First cap	Last cap
Juraj Ančic	MF	1	0	2002	2002
Ján Arpáš	MF	12	4	1939	1944
Peter Babnič	FW	12	1	2000	2004
Marek Bakoš*	FW	14	0	2012	
Jozef Baláži	FW	2	1	1943	1943
Igor Bališ	DF	41	1	1995	2001
Miroslav Barčík	MF	4	0	2003	2005
Matúš Bero*	MF	3	0	2016	
Ivan Belák	MF	4	0	2004	2004
Henrich Benčík	FW	11	0	2001	2003
Mário Bicák	MF	3	0	2006	2006
Marián Bochnovič	MF	4	0	1995	1997
František Bolček	FW	13	5	1939	1944
Balázs Borbély	DF	15	0	2004	2009
Mário Breška	FW	8	0	2002	2005
Miloš Brezinský	DF	3	0	2007	2008
Michal Breznaník*	MF	10	0	2012	
Juraj Buček	GK	11	0	2000	2003
Marek Čech*	DF	52	5	2004	
Miroslav Chvila	DF	1	1	1994	1994
Marián Čišovský*	DF	15	0	2002	2013
Juraj Čobej	GK	1	0	2006	2006
Kamil Čontofalský	GK	34	0	2002	2007
Juraj Czinege	MF	4	0	2002	2002
Ondrej Daňko	MF	3	0	1994	1994
Ondrej Debnár	DF	4	0	2002	2003
Igor Demo	DF	23	4	1997	2005
Pavol Diňa	FW	3	0	1994	1994
Marián Dirnbach	DF	3	0	1999	1999
Martin Dobrotka	DF	1	0	2009	2009
Peter Doležaj	DF	3	0	2004	2008
Juraj Dovičovič	MF	2	0	2004	2004
Miroslav Drobňák	MF	1	0	2003	2003
Peter Dubovský	MF	33	12	1994	2000
Martin Dúbravka	GK	2	0	2014	2026
Ondrej Duda	AT	42	5	2014	
Ján Ďurica*	DF	87	4	2004	
Martin Ďurica	MF	5	1	2003	2004
Michal Ďuriš*	FW	34	4	2012	
Peter Dzúrik	MF	44	2	1997	2003
Martin Fabuš	FW	25	5	1998	2003
Ľubomír Faktor	MF	5	1	1994	1995
Pavol Farkaš	DF	1	0	2006	2006
Peter Fieber	DF	1	0	1994	1994
Michal Filo	FW	1	0	2006	2006
Branislav Fodrek	MF	4	0	2004	2006
Tomáš Gerich	MF	1	0	2002	2002
Miloš Glonek	DF	12	0	1994	1996
Pavol Gostic	FW	2	0	1994	1995
Peter Grajciar	MF	3	1	2007	2011
Ján Greguš*	MF	11	0	2015	
Vratislav Greško	MF	34	2	2000	2007
Karim Guédé*	MF	14	0	2011	
Ľubomír Guldan*	DF	5	1	2012	
Norbert Gyömbér*	DF	16	0	2014	
Marián Had	DF	14	0	2004	2007
František Hadviger	DF	4	0	1999	2000
Ľuboš Hajdúch	GK	5	0	2006	2007
Juraj Halenár	FW	3	0	2007	2008
Marek Hamšík	MF	138	26	2007	2023
Michal Hanek	DF	14	0	2002	2005
Róbert Hanko	MF	3	0	1999	1999
Ľuboš Hanzel	DF	1	1	2009	2009
Andrej Hesek	FW	2	0	2007	2007
Michal Hipp	DF	5	0	1994	1994
Peter Hlinka	MF	28	1	2002	2006
Ivan Hodúr	MF	12	0	2002	2006
Marek Hollý	MF	1	0	2001	2001
Filip Hološko*	FW	65	8	2005	
Jakub Holúbek*	DF	3	0	2016	
Zsolt Hornyák	DF	3	0	2000	2001
Csaba Horváth	DF	1	0	2009	2009
Jaroslav Hrabal	DF	11	1	1999	2000
Eduard Hrnčár	DF	2	0	2002	2003
Norbert Hrnčár	MF	2	0	1998	1999
Patrik Hrošovský*	MF	16	0	2014	
Tomáš Hubočan*	DF	50	0	2006	
Miroslav Hýll	GK	6	0	1997	2002
Viliam Hýravý	FW	5	1	1994	1995
Milan Ivana	MF	2	0	2004	2006
Martin Jakubko*	FW	41	9	2004	2015
Tibor Jančula	FW	29	9	1995	2001
Vladimír Janočko	MF	41	3	1999	2006
Erik Jendrišek*	FW	37	4	2008	
Róbert Jež*	MF	9	3	2007	2012
Erik Ježík	DF	3	0	2000	2000
Michal Jonáš	DF	1	1	2006	2006
Jozef Juriga	MF	5	1	1995	1996
Ľuboš Kamenár	GK	2	0	2008	2009
Jozef Karel	MF	1	0	1944	1944
Miroslav Karhan	MF	107	14	1995	2011
Marek Kaščák	MF	1	0	2011	2011
Marián Kello*	GK	3	0	2011	2011
Vladimír Kinder	DF	38	1	1994	2001
Karol Kisel	MF	25	1	2002	2007
Filip Kiss*	MF	11	0	2014	
Peter Kiška	MF	2	0	2004	2004
Maroš Klimpl	DF	19	1	2002	2007
Jaroslav Kolbas	MF	2	0	2008	2008
Tomáš Kóňa*	MF	5	0	2011	
Martin Konečný	DF	6	0	1998	1999
Miroslav König	GK	43	0	1997	2004
Kamil Kopúnek*	MF	17	2	2006	2012
Rastislav Kostka	DF	3	0	1995	1997
Pavel Kováč	GK	2	0	2008	2008
Matúš Kozáčik	GK	25	0	2006	
Ivan Kozák	DF	38	0	1994	2002
Ján Kozák	MF	25	2	2004	2010
Jozef Kožlej	FW	24	3	1996	2005
Vladimír Kožuch	FW	17	3	1999	2000
Matej Krajčík	DF	18	0	2005	2009
Roman Kratochvíl	DF	35	0	1999	2008
Marek Krejčí	FW	1	0	2004	2004
Ondrej Krištofík	MF	7	0	1994	1995
František Kubík	FW	3	0	2011	
Dušan Kuciak*	GK	10	0	2006	
Juraj Kucka*	MF	52	6	2008	
Marián Kurty	MF	1	0	2003	2003
Branislav Labant	DF	7	0	2003	2003
Vladimír Labant	DF	26	2	1999	2004
Richard Lásik*	MF	3	1	2013	
Vladimír Leitner	DF	24	0	1998	2003
Stanislav Lobotka*	MF	1	0	2016	
Filip Lukšík	DF	2	0	2011	2011
Ľubomír Luhový	FW	9	0	1995	1998
Štefan Maixner	FW	3	0	1995	1996
Pavol Majerník	MF	1	0	2006	2006
Jozef Majoroš	FW	23	5	1997	1999
Róbert Mak*	MF	34	9	2013	
Milan Malatinský	MF	2	0	1994	1994
Ľubomír Meszároš	FW	8	1	2000	2002
Ľubomír Michalík*	DF	8	2	2006	
Rastislav Michalík	MF	20	0	2002	2005
Marek Mintál	MF	45	14	2002	2009
Ladislav Molnár	GK	24	0	1994	1997
Ľubomír Moravčík	MF	37	7	1994	2000
Stanislav Moravec	MF	4	0	1994	1994
Ján Mucha	GK	46	0	2008	
Adam Nemec	FW	27	8	2006	
Krisztián Németh	DF	1	0	2004	2004
Peter Németh	MF	22	3	1999	2001
Szilárd Németh	FW	57	22	1997	2006
Ján Novák	FW	4	0	2008	2009
Ján Novota	GK	4	0	2014	
Martin Obšitník	FW	4	0	1994	1994
Branislav Obžera	MF	6	0	2007	2009
Tomáš Oravec	FW	9	3	2001	2010
Michal Pančík	MF	1	0	2000	2000
Michal Pančík	MF	1	0	2006	2006
Lukáš Pauschek*	DF	5	0	2012	
Mário Pečalka	DF	3	0	2009	2011
Ladislav Pecko	DF	6	0	1995	2001
Viktor Pečovský*	MF	34	1	2012	
Peter Pekarík*	DF	73	2	2006	
Marek Penksa	FW	7	0	1994	1995
Dušan Perniš*	GK	6	0	2004	
Martin Petráš	DF	39	1	2002	2010
Peter Petráš	DF	10	0	2006	2010
Attila Pinte	MF	30	1	1998	2003
Juraj Piroska	FW	3	1	2011	2011
Jozef Pisár	FW	4	1	1997	1998
Martin Poljovka	DF	2	0	2004	2004
Ján Podhradský	FW	4	1	1942	1944
Andrej Porázik	FW	2	1	2004	2004
Karol Praženica	MF	6	0	1995	1997
Roman Procházka*	MF	3	0	2011	2012
Martin Prohászka	FW	3	0	1999	2000
Theodor Reimann	GK	14	0	1939	1943
Ľubomír Reiter	FW	28	9	2001	2005
Albert Rusnák*	MF	1	0	2016	
Štefan Rusnák	FW	7	1	1994	1995
Branislav Rzeszoto	GK	3	0	2002	2003
Erik Sabo*	DF	12	0	2008	
Kornel Saláta*	DF	40	2	2008	
Marek Sapara*	MF	38	5	2005	2013
Karol Schulz	DF	4	0	1999	1999
Filip Šebo	FW	15	7	2006	2011
Pavol Sedlák	MF	2	0	2000	2006
Miroslav Seman	GK	2	0	1996	1998
Róbert Semeník	FW	8	1	1995	1997
Štefan Senecký	GK	12	0	2007	2009
Stanislav Šesták*	FW	66	13	2004	2016
Július Šimon	MF	23	6	1995	1997
Peter Šinglár	DF	5	0	2006	2007
Milan Škriniar*	DF	7	0	2016	
Martin Škrtel*	DF	88	6	2004	
Peter Slicho	MF	4	0	1999	1999
Samuel Slovák	MF	20	0	1996	2007
Ondrej Šmelko	DF	7	1	1999	2001
Dušan Sninský	MF	8	0	2003	2005
Miloš Soboňa	DF	3	0	1995	2000
Jan Solar	MF	3	0	1994	1995
Anton Šoltis	MF	2	0	2002	2002
Miroslav Sovič	MF	12	1	1997	1998
Marek Špilár	DF	30	0	1997	2002
Leopold Šťastný	MF	1	0	1940	1940
Lukáš Štetina*	DF	1	0	2013	
Miroslav Stoch*	MF	55	6	2009	
Zdeno Štrba	MF	26	0	2003	2010
Tomáš Stúpala	DF	14	0	1994	1995
Peter Štyvar	MF	2	0	2009	2009
Marián Šuchančok	DF	9	0	1999	2001
Kamil Susko	GK	15	0	1999	2000
Anton Suchý	MF	2	0	1999	1999
Dušan Švento*	MF	47	1	2006	
Jakub Sylvestr*	FW	6	0	2010	
Otto Szabó	DF	3	0	2007	2007
Ľubomír Talda	MF	2	0	2002	2002
Viktor Tegelhoff	FW	3	0	1943	1944
Lukáš Tesák	DF	4	0	2015	2016
Jaroslav Timko	FW	18	7	1994	1997
Milan Timko	DF	29	1	1997	2002
Dušan Tittel	MF	44	7	1994	1998
Róbert Tomaschek	MF	50	4	1994	2001
Dušan Tóth	MF	5	0	1996	1997
Ivan Trabalík	GK	1	0	2004	2004
Marek Ujlaky	MF	40	2	1995	2001
Rudolf Urban	MF	6	0	2003	2004
Jozef Valachovič	DF	33	1	1999	2009
Stanislav Varga	DF	54	2	1997	2006
Blažej Vaščák	MF	3	0	2007	2008
Pavol Vavrík	DF	2	0	2002	2003
Alexander Vencel	GK	19	0	1994	1998
Viliam Vidumsky	DF	1	0	1994	1994
Róbert Vittek*	FW	81	23	2001	
Dušan Vrťo	DF	2	0	1994	1994
Vladimír Weiss, Sr.	MF	12	1	1994	1995
Vladimír Weiss, Jr.*	MF	58	5	2009	
Radoslav Zabavník*	DF	59	1	2003	2012
Tibor Zátek	DF	13	0	1997	2000
Marián Zeman	DF	27	2	1994	2003
Igor Žofčák	MF	14	0	2004	2011
Vladislav Zvara	MF	29	0	1994	2000
Marek Rodák	GK	26	0	2020	2026
