= 1998 FIFA World Cup qualification – UEFA Group 6 =

Football tournament qualifying stage

Group 6 consisted of six of the 50 teams entered into the European zone: (Note: Only 49 of the entered teams actually competed in the qualification tournament: France qualified for the World Cup automatically as host.) Czech Republic, Faroe Islands, Malta, Slovakia, Spain, and Yugoslavia. These six teams competed on a home-and-away basis for two of the 15 spots in the final tournament allocated to the European zone, with the group's winner and runner-up claiming those spots.

== Standings ==
Pos	Team	Pld	W	D	L	GF	GA	GD	Pts	Qualification	Spain national football team	Serbia and Montenegro national football team	Czech Republic national football team	Slovakia national football team	Faroe Islands national football team	Malta national football team
1	Spain	10	8	2	0	26	6	+20	26	Qualification to 1998 FIFA World Cup	—	2–0	1–0	4–1	3–1	4–0
2	FR Yugoslavia	10	7	2	1	29	7	+22	23	Advance to second round	1–1	—	1–0	2–0	3–1	6–0
3	Czech Republic	10	5	1	4	16	6	+10	16		0–0	1–2	—	3–0	2–0	6–0
4	Slovakia	10	5	1	4	18	14	+4	16		1–2	1–1	2–1	—	3–0	6–0
5	Faroe Islands	10	2	0	8	10	31	−21	6		2–6	1–8	0–2	1–2	—	2–1
6	Malta	10	0	0	10	2	37	−35	0		0–3	0–5	0–1	0–2	1–2	—

== Matches ==
24 April 1996
19:00 UTC+2

FR Yugoslavia	3–1	Faroe Islands
Savićević 3', 29'; Milošević 37'	Report	J. Petersen 53'

Stadion Crvena Zvezda, Belgrade
Attendance: 16,325
Referee: Roland Beck (Liechtenstein)

2 June 1996
20:00 UTC+2

FR Yugoslavia	6–0	Malta
Mirković 2'; Mijatović 39'; D. Stojković 45+1'; Milošević 68'; Savićević 70' (pen.), 73'	Report

Stadion Crvena Zvezda, Belgrade
Attendance: 11,617
Referee: Hermann Albrecht (Germany)

31 August 1996
15:00 UTC+1

Faroe Islands	1–2	Slovakia
Müller 60'	Report	Moravčik 13'; Dubovský 88'

Svangaskarð, Toftir
Attendance: 1,445
Referee: Terje Hauge (Norway)

4 September 1996
17:45 UTC+1

Faroe Islands	2–6	Spain
T. Jónsson 46'; Arge 90'	Report	Luis Enrique 37'; Alfonso 63', 83', 86'; Johannesen 70' (o.g.); Hierro 85'

Svangaskarð, Toftir
Attendance: 4,200
Referee: Philippe Leduc (France)

18 September 1996
16:30 UTC+2

Czech Republic	6–0	Malta
Berger 11', 63' (pen.); Nedvěd 29'; Kubík 77'; Šmicer 83'; Frýdek 86'	Report

Na Stínadlech, Teplice
Attendance: 15,099
Referee: Mateo Beušan (Croatia)

22 September 1996
18:00 UTC+2

Slovakia	6–0	Malta
Tittel 13', 90'; Šimon 15'; Zeman 37'; Timko 56'; Dubovský 59'	Report

Tehelne pole, Bratislava
Attendance: 2,236
Referee: Giorgos Bikas (Greece)

6 October 1996
15:00 UTC+1

Faroe Islands	1–8	FR Yugoslavia
Müller 28'	Report	Milošević 6', 37', 45'; Jokanović 11', 57'; Mijatović 29'; Jugović 57'; D. Stojković 90' (pen.)

Svangaskarð, Toftir
Attendance: 1,017
Referee: Leslie Irvine (Northern Ireland)
9 October 1996
20:15 UTC+2

Czech Republic	0–0	Spain
	Report

Sparta, Prague
Attendance: 19,223
Referee: Anders Frisk (Sweden)

23 October 1996
18:00 UTC+2

Slovakia	3–0	Faroe Islands
Dubovský 20'; Jančula 44'; Šimon 57' (pen.)	Report

Tehelné pole, Bratislava
Attendance: 5,442
Referee: Salem Prolic (Bosnia and Herzegovina)

10 November 1996
18:00 UTC+1

FR Yugoslavia	1–0	Czech Republic
Mijatović 18'	Report

Stadion Crvena Zvezda, Belgrade
Attendance: 46,577
Referee: Dick Jol (Netherlands)
13 November 1996
20:30 UTC+1

Spain	4–1	Slovakia
Pizzi 30'; Amor 46'; Luis Enrique 57'; Hierro 61'	Report	Tittel 39'

Estadio Heliodoro Rodríguez López, Santa Cruz
Attendance: 13,500
Referee: Markus Merk (Germany)

14 December 1996
21:30 UTC+1

Spain	2–0	FR Yugoslavia
Guardiola 19' (pen.); Raúl 37'	Report

Estadio Mestalla, Valencia
Attendance: 37,000
Referee: Serge Muhmenthaler (Switzerland)

18 December 1996
19:00 UTC+1

Malta	0–3	Spain
	Report	Guerrero 8', 26', 33'

National Stadium, Ta'Qali
Attendance: 3,200
Referee: Nikolai Levnikov (Russia)

12 February 1997
21:30 UTC+1

Spain	4–0	Malta
Guardiola 25'; Alfonso 40', 47'; Pizzi 89'	Report

Estadio José Rico Pérez, Alicante
Attendance: 28,000
Referee: Stephen Lodge (England)

31 March 1997
16:00 UTC+2

Malta	0–2	Slovakia
	Report	Jančula 38'; Tittel 90'

National Stadium, Ta'Qali
Attendance: 4,202
Referee: Marek Kowalczyk (Poland)
2 April 1997
20:15 UTC+2

Czech Republic	1–2	FR Yugoslavia
Bejbl 69'	Report	Mijatović 27'; Milošević 90'

Sparta, Prague
Attendance: 17,137
Referee: Marc Batta (France)

30 April 1997
18:15 UTC+2

FR Yugoslavia	1–1	Spain
Mijatović 87' (pen.)	Report	Hierro 19' (pen.)

Stadion Crvena Zvezda, Belgrade
Attendance: 49,253
Referee: Rune Pedersen (Norway)
30 April 1997
20:00 UTC+2

Malta	1–2	Faroe Islands
Sultana 8'	Report	Ø. Hansen 60'; T. Jónsson 89'

National Stadium, Ta'Qali
Attendance: 8,188
Referee: Dani Koren (Israel)

8 June 1997
20:15 UTC+2

Spain	1–0	Czech Republic
Hierro 41' (pen.)	Report

Estadio Nuevo José Zorrilla, Valladolid
Attendance: 24,544
Referee: Hugh Dallas (Scotland)
8 June 1997
20:00 UTC+2

FR Yugoslavia	2–0	Slovakia
Savićević 17'; Mijatović 75'	Report

Stadion Crvena Zvezda, Belgrade
Attendance: 22,044
Referee: Peter Mikkelsen (Denmark)
8 June 1997
15:00 UTC+1

Faroe Islands	2–1	Malta
Arge 7'; T. Jónsson 42'	Report	G. Agius 48'

Svangaskarð, Toftir
Attendance: 6,400
Referee: Richard O'Hanlon (Republic of Ireland)

20 August 1997
16:30 UTC+2

Czech Republic	2–0	Faroe Islands
Kuka 14'; Kozel 27'	Report

Na Stínadlech, Teplice
Attendance: 8,322
Referee: Algirdas Dubinskas (Lithuania)

24 August 1997
20:15 UTC+2

Slovakia	2–1	Czech Republic
Jančula 45'; Majoroš 55'	Report	Šmicer 14'

Tehelné pole, Bratislava
Attendance: 22,500
Referee: Piero Ceccarini (Italy)

6 September 1997
15:00 UTC+1

Faroe Islands	0–2	Czech Republic
	Report	Šmicer 16'; Kuka 32'

Svangaskarð, Toftir
Attendance: 2,700
Referee: Bernard Saules (France)
10 September 1997
20:15 UTC+2

Slovakia	1–1	FR Yugoslavia
Majoroš 64'	Report	Mihajlović 79'

Tehelné pole, Bratislava
Attendance: 22,500
Referee: Anders Frisk (Sweden)

24 September 1997
20:15 UTC+2

Slovakia	1–2	Spain
Majoroš 75'	Report	Kiko 47'; Amor 767'

Tehelne pole, Bratislava
Attendance: 13,667
Referee: László Vágner (Hungary)
24 September 1997
19:30 UTC+2

Malta	0–1	Czech Republic
	Report	Bejbl 33'

National Stadium, Ta'Qali
Attendance: 1,622
Referee: Armand Ancion (Belgium)

11 October 1997
20:00 UTC+2

Spain	3–1	Faroe Islands
Luis Enrique 18', 82'; Oli 28'	Report	J. K. Hansen 45'

El Molinón, Gijón
Attendance: 25,000
Referee: Jacek Granat (Poland)
11 October 1997
18:00 UTC+2

Malta	0–5	FR Yugoslavia
	Report	Milošević 8'; Mihajlović 34'; Savićević 44'; Mijatović 54'; Jugović 76'

National Stadium, Ta'Qali
Attendance: 1,107
Referee: Dermot Gallagher (England)
11 October 1997
20:00 UTC+2

Czech Republic	3–0	Slovakia
Šmicer 54'; Siegl 71'; Novotný 73'	Report

Sparta, Prague
Attendance: 5,428
Referee: Urs Meier (Switzerland)

== Goalscorers ==
There were 101 goals scored in 30 matches, for an average of 3.37 goals per match.

7 goals

- (Federal Republic of Yugoslavia) Predrag Mijatović
- (Federal Republic of Yugoslavia) Savo Milošević

6 goals

- (Federal Republic of Yugoslavia) Dejan Savićević

5 goals

- (Spain) Alfonso Pérez

4 goals

- (Czech Republic) Vladimír Šmicer
- (Slovakia) Dušan Tittel
- (Spain) Luis Enrique
- (Spain) Fernando Hierro

3 goals

- (Faroe Islands) Todi Jónsson
- (Slovakia) Peter Dubovský
- (Slovakia) Tibor Jančula
- (Slovakia) Jozef Majoroš
- (Spain) Julen Guerrero

2 goals

- (Czech Republic) Radek Bejbl
- (Czech Republic) Pavel Kuka
- (Czech Republic) Patrik Berger
- (Faroe Islands) Uni Arge
- (Faroe Islands) Jan Allan Müller
- (Slovakia) Július Šimon
- (Spain) Guillermo Amor
- (Spain) Pep Guardiola
- (Spain) Juan Antonio Pizzi
- (Federal Republic of Yugoslavia) Slaviša Jokanović
- (Federal Republic of Yugoslavia) Vladimir Jugović
- (Federal Republic of Yugoslavia) Siniša Mihajlović
- (Federal Republic of Yugoslavia) Dragan Stojković

1 goal

- (Czech Republic) Martin Frýdek
- (Czech Republic) Luboš Kozel
- (Czech Republic) Luboš Kubík
- (Czech Republic) Pavel Nedvěd
- (Czech Republic) Jiří Novotný
- (Czech Republic) Horst Siegl
- (Faroe Islands) Jens Kristian Hansen
- (Faroe Islands) Øssur Hansen
- (Faroe Islands) John Petersen
- (Malta) Gilbert Agius
- (Malta) Stefan Sultana
- (Slovakia) Ľubomír Moravčík
- (Slovakia) Jaroslav Timko
- (Slovakia) Marian Zeman
- (Spain) Kiko
- (Spain) Oli
- (Spain) Raúl
- (Federal Republic of Yugoslavia) Zoran Mirković

1 own goal

- (Faroe Islands) Óli Johannesen (against Spain)
