= Vojtech Závodský =

Slovak footballer (1904–1977)

Personal information
- Date of birth: 25 October 1904
- Place of birth: Žilina, Austria-Hungary
- Date of death: 29 October 1977 (aged 73)
- Place of death: Žilina, Czechoslovakia
- Position: Goalkeeper

Youth career
- –1923: Žilina

Senior career*
Years	Team	Apps	(Gls)
1923–1938	Žilina		

Managerial career
- 1939: Slovakia
- * Club domestic league appearances and goals

Vojtech Závodský (25 October 1904 – 29 October 1977) was a Slovak football goalkeeper, football manager, ice hockey forward, ice hockey referee and sports administrator. He is remembered for starring Žilina in its early years and for managing Slovakia in its premier match against Germany.

== Football career ==
As a student Závodský took part in the founding session of Slovak Football Association, which took place in Žilina on 9 August 1919.

As a goalkeeper, he led ŠK Žilina to two Slovak league titles in 1928 and 1929. After his career, he served as a secretary for the club and worked towards developing the local football stadium. Due to his small posture, he was nicknamed Slovak Plánička.

=== Slovakia vs Germany (1939) ===
Závodský managed Slovakia in its debut international match on Sunday 27 August 1939 against Germany. The match in Bratislava resulted in a 2–0 Slovak victory, following goals by Ján Arpáš and Jozef Luknár. He was assisted by his future successor Rudolf Hanák.

== Ice hockey career ==
He was one of the pioneers of the ice hockey in Žilina. In ice hockey he played as a goalkeeper for Žilina. As with football, he also encouraged and worked towards the development of artificial ice hockey stadium in Žilina. Following his career, he also worked as a club official for the ice hockey team. He also chaired the ice hockey referees' committee in Žilina Region and was a leading figure in the Slovak Ice Hockey Federation.

The stadium bears his name since 1999. He is also commemorated by a memorial plaque in the hall of the stadium. On 4 December 2009, on the 85th anniversary of the establishment of ice hockey in Žilina, Závdoský was one of the first two inductees in to Žilina Ice Hockey Hall of Fame, along with Vavro Ryšavý.

== Death ==
In the afternoon of 29 October 1977, he attended a football match between ZVL Žilina and Slovan ChZJD Bratislava. The match concluded in a dominant 5:1 victory for the home side, despite a 1:1 tie after half-time. Shortly after Ivan Vrábel scored the final goal of the match for ZVL, Závodský had suffered a stroke. By the evening he had died in the local hospital days after his 73rd birthday. He is buried at the Old Municipal Cemetery in Žilina.
