= Jozef Luknár =

Slovak footballer and manager

Personal information
- Full name: Jozef Luknár
- Date of birth: 15 January 1915
- Place of birth: Ivanka pri Dunaji, Bohemia, Cisleithania, Austria-Hungary
- Date of death: 13 May 1966 (aged 51)
- Place of death: Modra, Slovak SR, Czechoslovakia
- Position: Forward

Senior career*
Years	Team	Apps	(Gls)
–1936	Štefánik Ivanka		
1936–1946	1. ČsŠK/ŠK Bratislava	192	(119)
1946–1947	SK Olomouc ASO		

International career
1938	Czechoslovakia	1	(0)
1939–1944	Slovakia	9	(4)

Managerial career
- 1946–1947: SK Olomouc ASO (player-manager)
- Malacky
- ŠK Dynamitka
- Pezinok
- 19??–1966: Modra
- * Club domestic league appearances and goals

Jozef Luknár (15 January 1915 – 13 May 1966) was a Slovak footballer and manager who played as a forward and appeared for both the Czechoslovakia and Slovakia national teams.

== Career ==
Luknár earned his first and only cap for Czechoslovakia on 3 April 1938 in the 1936–38 Central European International Cup against Switzerland, which finished as a 0–4 loss in Basel. He later represented the Slovakia national team, making his first appearance in the team's inaugural on 27 August 1939 in a friendly against Germany. Luknár scored the second goal of the match, which finished as a 2–0 win in Bratislava. He was capped nine times in total for Slovakia and scored four goals, making his final appearance on 9 April 1944 in a friendly match against Croatia, which finished as a 2–7 loss in Zagreb.

== Personal life ==
Luknár was born in Ivanka pri Dunaji on 15 January 1915, and was nicknamed Hammer (Slovak: Kladivo). He died on 13 May 1966 while coaching a training session in Modra at the age of 51.

== Career statistics ==
=== International ===
Team	Year	Apps	Goals
Czechoslovakia	1938	1	0
Czechoslovakia	Total	1	0
Slovakia	1939	2	2
Slovakia	1940	2	1
Slovakia	1941	1	0
Slovakia	1942	3	1
Slovakia	1944	1	0
Slovakia	Total	9	4
Career total		10	4

=== International goals ===
No.	Date	Venue	Opponent	Score	Result	Competition
1	27 August 1939	Stadion Slovana, Bratislava, Slovak Republic	Germany	2–0	2–0	Friendly
2	3 December 1939	Großkampfbahn, Chemnitz, Germany	Germany	1–0	1–3	Friendly
3	6 June 1940	Yunak Stadium, Sofia, Kingdom of Bulgaria	Bulgaria	2–1	4–1	Friendly
4	22 November 1942	Tehelné pole, Bratislava, Slovak Republic	Germany	1–3	2–5	Friendly
