= Štefan Maixner =

Slovak footballer

Personal information
- Date of birth: 14 April 1968 (age 58)
- Place of birth: Bratislava, Czechoslovakia
- Height: 1.80 m (5 ft 11 in)
- Position: Forward

Youth career
- 1976–1984: Rapid Bratislava
- 1984–1990: Slovan Bratislava
- 1990: ČH Bratislava

Senior career*
Years	Team	Apps	(Gls)
1990–1992	Dunajská Streda	47	(13)
1992–1998	Slovan Bratislava	103	(29)
1993	Drnovice	4	(2)
1998–2005	Petržalka	160	(21)
2005–2006	Zlaté Moravce		
- Berg
- Veľký Meder

International career^{‡}
1996	Slovakia	3	(0)
- * Club domestic league appearances and goals as of 29 February 2012 ‡ National team caps and goals as of 29 February 2012

Štefan Maixner (born 14 April 1968) is a former Slovak football striker. He played in the Gambrinus liga for Drnovice in 1993.
