= Ondrej Šmelko =

Slovak footballer

Personal information
- Full name: Ondrej Šmelko
- Date of birth: 1 September 1967 (age 59)
- Place of birth: Bardejov, Czechoslovakia
- Height: 1.74 m (5 ft 8 1/2 in)
- Position: Defender

Senior career*
Years	Team	Apps	(Gls)
1991–1993	Inter Bratislava	38	(0)
1994–1996	Svit Zlín	22	(2)
1997–2003	Ozeta Dukla Trenčín	137	(7)
2003	Gazovik-Gazprom Izhevsk	41	(0)
2004–2006	Laugarico Trenčín	29	(2)
2006–2008	Slovan Nemšová		

International career
1999–2001	Slovakia	7	(1)

Managerial career
- 2008–?: Trenčín youth
- ?–2015: Nemšová
- * Club domestic league appearances and goals

Ondrej Šmelko (born 1 September 1967) is a former Slovak international football defender who played for clubs in Czechoslovakia and Russia.

== Career ==
Born in Bardejov, Šmelko began playing football for FK Inter Bratislava. He would make 38 appearances in the Czechoslovak first division with Inter Bratislava, and a further 22 appearances in the Czech first division with FC Svit Zlín. He enjoyed a successful spell with Slovak side Ozeta Dukla Trenčín, and joined Russian side FC Gazovik-Gazprom Izhevsk for the 2003 Russian First Division season.

Šmelko made several appearances for the Slovakia national football team.

After he retired from playing professional football, Šmelko became a football coach for AS Trenčín's youth team at age 41.
