= František Bolček =

Slovak footballer

Personal information
- Date of birth: 27 January 1920
- Place of birth: Trnava, Czechoslovakia
- Date of death: 3 January 1968 (aged 47)
- Position: Forward

Senior career*
Years	Team	Apps	(Gls)
1939–1942	TŠS Trnava		
1942–1943	OAP Bratislava	23	(12)
1943–1950	TŠS/Kovosmalt Trnava		

International career
1939–1944	Slovakia	13	(5)
- * Club domestic league appearances and goals

František Bolček (27 January 1920 – 3 January 1968) was a Slovak footballer, who played for FC Spartak Trnava in the 1930s and 1940s, as well as for the Army team OAP Bratislava during World War II. He scored 12 goals in 23 appearances for Bratislava.

Bolček made 13 appearances for the Slovakia national football team from 1939 to 1944, scoring 5 goals. He made his international debut on 27 August 1939. He scored his first goal for Slovakia in a 4–1 away victory against Bulgaria on 6 June 1940.
