= Július Šimon =

Slovak footballer

Personal information
- Full name: Július Šimon
- Date of birth: 19 July 1965 (age 61)
- Place of birth: Lučenec, Czechoslovakia
- Height: 1.82 m (6 ft 0 in)
- Position: Midfielder

Youth career
- 1971–1985: Lučenec
- 1985–1987: Poprad

Senior career*
Years	Team	Apps	(Gls)
1987–1993	Dunajská Streda	139	(20)
1993–1995	Košice	40	(13)
1995–1997	Spartak Trnava	59	(25)
1997–1998	Austria Wien	46	(10)
1999	SV Ried	6	(0)
1999	Petržalka	12	(3)
2000	Dunajská Streda	14	(6)
2003–2004	Dunajská Streda		
2004–2005	Senec		
2007	SC Columbia		

International career
1995–1997	Slovakia	23	(6)

Managerial career
- 2012–?: Dunajská Streda (assistant)
- 2016: Talen Vision Bulawayo
- 2017–: Gyirmót SE (assistant)
- * Club domestic league appearances and goals as of 23 February 2012

Július Šimon (born 19 July 1965) is a former Slovak football player. He previously played for FC Spartak Trnava, Austria Wien and DAC Dunajská Streda. He also played for Slovakia, for which he participated in 23 matches and scored 6 goals.
