= Tehelné pole (1939) =

Football stadium in Bratislava, Slovakia

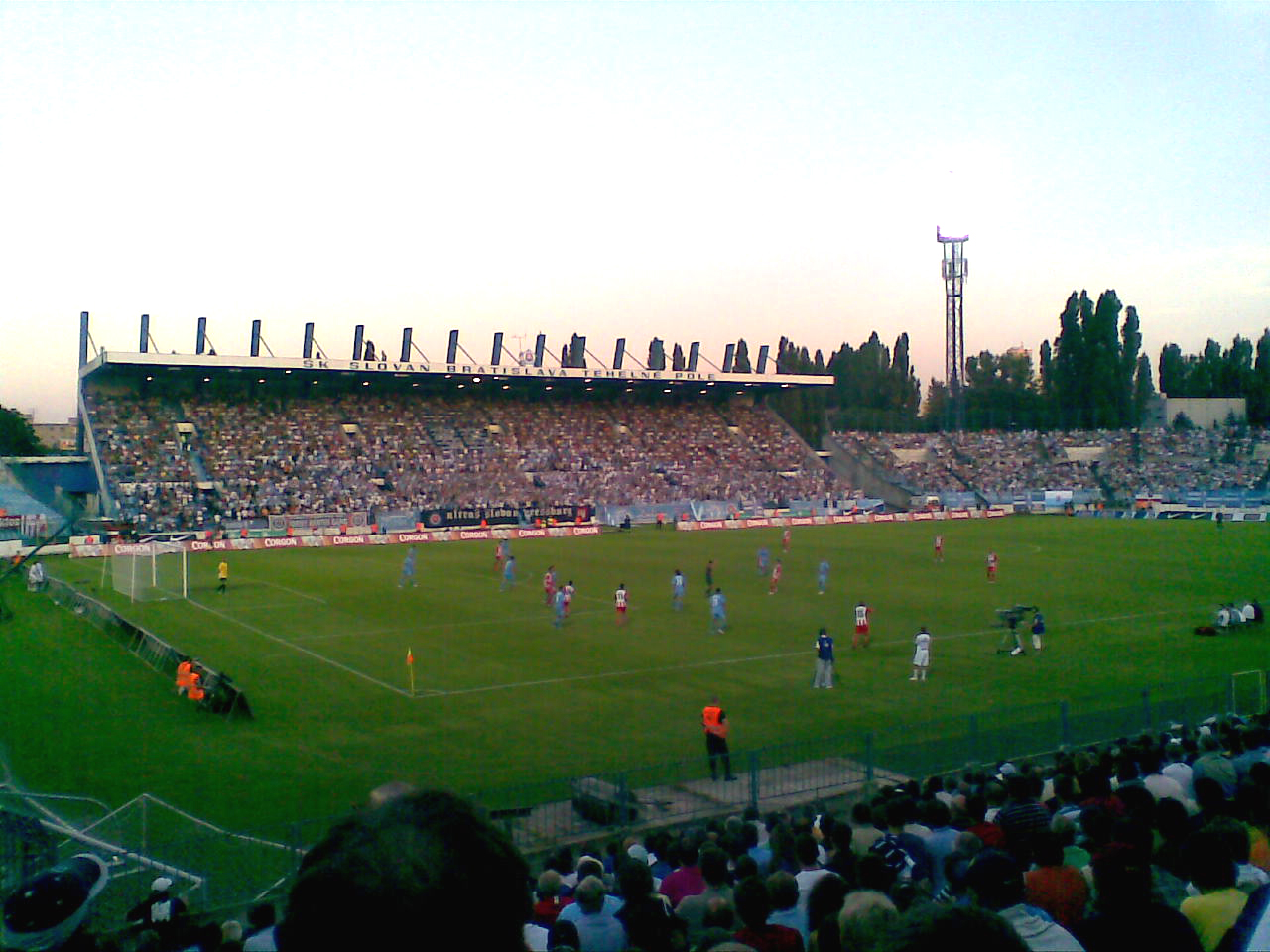
- Interactive map of Tehelné pole
- Former names: Slovan Stadion (1939)
- Location: Bratislava, Slovakia
- Coordinates: 48°9′49″N 17°8′13″E
- Capacity: 30,000
- Record attendance: 70,000 (Czechoslovakia–Yugoslavia, 18 May 1957
- Field size: 105 x 68 m

Construction
- Built: 1939
- Opened: September 27, 1940
- Renovated: 1961, 1990
- Expanded: 1955, 1961
- Closed: 25 November 2009
- Demolished: 2013
- Cost: 8 million SKK
- Architect: Kamil Gross

Tenants
- Slovan Bratislava (1940–2009); Slovakia national football team (1996–2009)

Tehelné pole is a neighborhood in Bratislava, Slovakia, characterized by the presence of several sports facilities. Administratively, the neighborhood belongs to Nové Mesto borough, situated around 5 km north-east of the centre. The German and Hungarian names for this locality are Ziegelfeld and Téglamező.

== Football ==
Most commonly, the name refers to the football stadium in this district which is the home ground of Slovan Bratislava and the regular home of the Slovakia national team. The stadium had a capacity of 30,085 spectators and the playing surface was 105 m long and 68 m wide. It was built during the First Slovak Republic, when Nazi Germany occupied Petržalka in 1938 and Bratislava lost almost all of its sporting facilities. The construction lasted from 1939 to 1944 and the stadium became the home ground for Slovan Bratislava. The stadium was officially opened in September 1940 with a capacity of 25,000, and the first international match was played on 27 October 1940, with Slovan Bratislava playing against Hertha Berlin, ending in a 2–2 draw.

The old stadium underwent reconstruction in 1961, adding a second stand, boosting its capacity to 45,000, as well as a scoreboard, artificial lighting and revamping the field. Later, the capacity was increased to 50,000, and just before the breakup of Czechoslovakia, it was the largest stadium in use (Strahov Stadium in Prague had a capacity of 220,000 but was disused in the 1990s) and was the home ground for the Czechoslovak national team.

The stadium was reconstructed once more in the 1990s to an "all-seater" stadium, reducing the capacity to 30,000. After this, the Tehelné pole stadium was the second-largest in Slovakia after Všešportový areál in Košice. In 2005–06, it was also used as the "home" ground for FC Artmedia Bratislava in that club's Champions League and UEFA Cup campaigns, as Artmedia's own ground did not meet minimum standards for UEFA competitions.

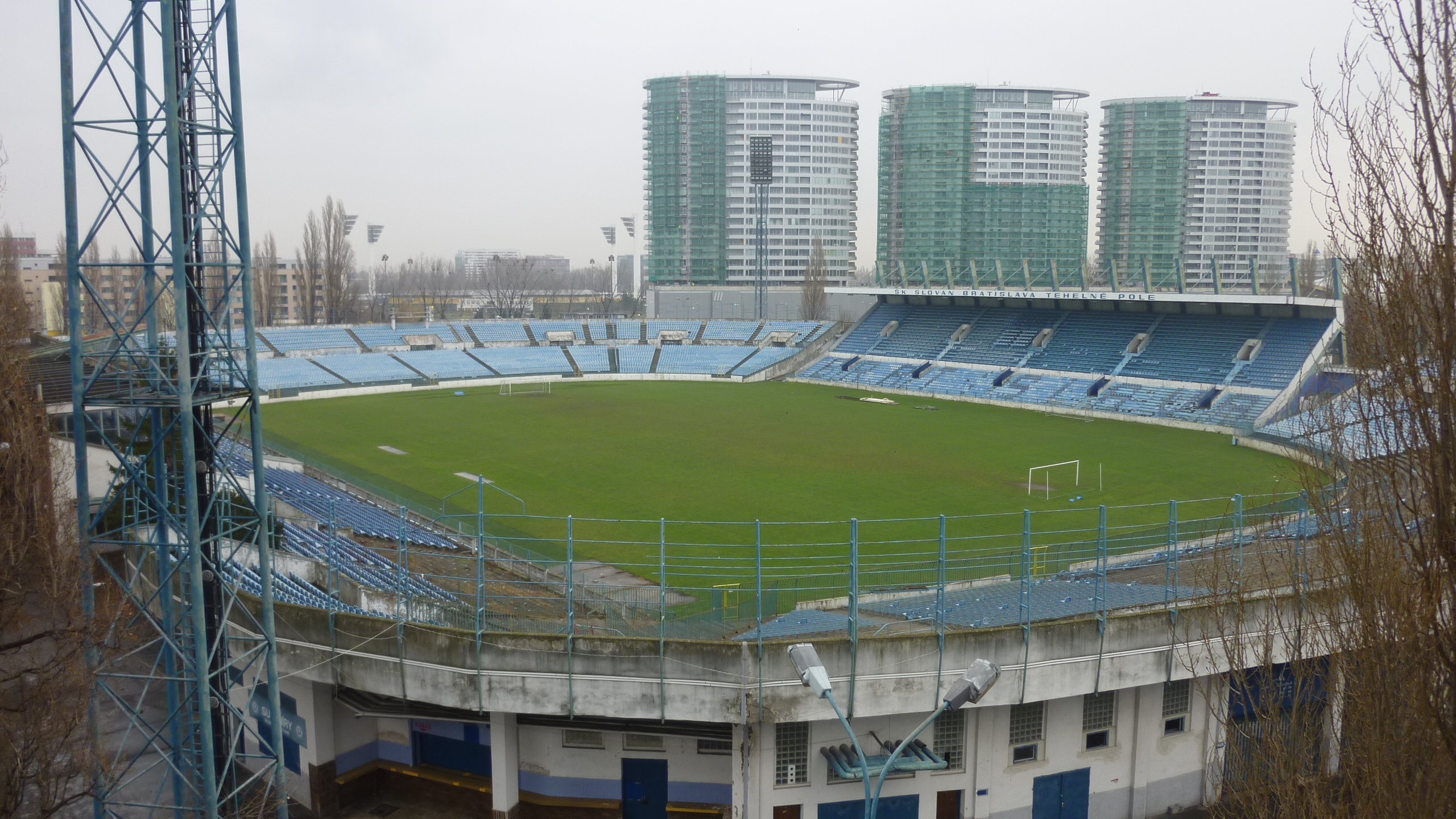
The stadium in January 2011

Plans were made to demolish the stadium and replace it with a new one. The new stadium was planned to have a capacity of around 35,000 and cost around €80 million. The need for a new stadium stemmed from UEFA rules requiring international matches to be played in stadiums of certain standards from 2008, however, Slovakia lacked these stadiums. In July 2009, the Slovak government decided to support the construction of a new stadium. The demolition works were planned for March–April 2010 and the new stadium was planned to open in December 2017. Its capacity was planned to be 22,000 spectators with a possible enlargement to 30,000.

The stadium was permanently closed in 2009, and its destruction, carried out very late, began in July 2013. The new stadium opened in 2019.

== Lido ==
A lido with the same name was built near the football stadium in 1939. It survives to the present day and currently has three swimming pools of varying size, with additional services.
