= Ján Arpáš =

Slovak footballer (1917–1976)

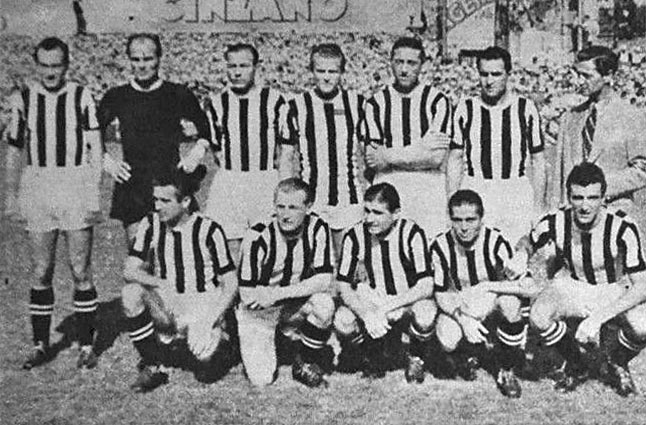
- Ján Arpáš (back row, third from left) as part of Juventus in 1947

Personal information
- Date of birth: 7 November 1917
- Place of birth: Pressburg, Austria-Hungary
- Date of death: 16 April 1976 (aged 58)
- Position: Striker

Senior career*
Years	Team	Apps	(Gls)
1939–1946	ŠK Slovan Bratislava	166	(151)
1947–1948	Juventus FC	18	(6)
Total		184	(157)

International career
1939–1944	Slovakia	12	(4)
- * Club domestic league appearances and goals

Ján Arpáš (7 November 1917 – 16 April 1976) was a Slovak football player. He played for Slovakia. In his country he played for ŠK Slovan Bratislava. In Italy he played for Juventus FC.

He also played twelve times for Slovakia between 1939 and 1944, including scoring his country's first international goal, against Germany on 27 August 1939.

== Career statistics ==
=== International goals ===
#	Date	Venue	Opponent	Score	Result	Competition
1.	27 August 1939	Stadion Slovana, Bratislava, Slovak Republic	Germany	2–0	Win	Friendly
2.	9 April 1944	Stadion Concordije, Zagreb, Croatia	(Independent State of Croatia) Croatia	7–3	Loss	Friendly
3.	9 April 1944	Stadion Concordije, Zagreb, Croatia	(Independent State of Croatia) Croatia	7–3	Loss	Friendly
4.	9 April 1944	Stadion Concordije, Zagreb, Croatia	(Independent State of Croatia) Croatia	7–3	Loss	Friendly
Correct as of 13 January 2017
