= Tibor Jančula =

Slovak footballer

Personal information
- Full name: Tibor Jančula
- Date of birth: 16 June 1969 (age 57)
- Place of birth: Bernolákovo, Czechoslovakia
- Height: 1.75 m (5 ft 9 in)
- Position: Forward

Youth career
- Bernolákovo
- Ivánka pri Dunaji

Senior career*
Years	Team	Apps	(Gls)
1988–1990	ČH Bratislava		
1990–1993	DAC Dunajská Streda	76	(16)
1993–1995	Viktoria Žižkov	47	(15)
1995–1997	Casino Salzburg	49	(9)
1997	Slovan Bratislava	13	(0)
1997	Fortuna Düsseldorf	15	(2)
1998	Beveren	7	(2)
1998–2001	Slovan Bratislava	66	(30)
2001–2002	Ferencváros	9	(1)
2004	Družstevník Báč		

International career
1995–2001	Slovakia	29	(9)

Managerial career
- 201?–: Slovan Bratislava B
- * Club domestic league appearances and goals

Tibor Jančula (born 16 June 1969) is a former Slovak football striker who played mostly for DAC Dunajská Streda and Slovan Bratislava in Slovakia.

Jančula is a native of Záleś in Bernolákovo and grew up playing football. He comes from a sporting family, with his father – also named Tibor – being a footballer as well. At international level, Jančula made 29 appearances and scored nine goals for the Slovakia national football team from 1995 to 2001. He worked as an entrepreneur after finishing his football career.

== International goals ==
#	Date	Venue	Opponent	Score	Result	Competition
.	16 August 1995	Hüseyin Avni Aker Stadium, Trabzon, Turkey	Azerbaijan	1–0	1–0	Euro 1996 Q
