= 2006 Slovak Cup final =

- Event: 2005–06 Slovak Cup
FC Spartak Trnava	MFK Ružomberok
0	0
- Ružomberok won 4–3 on penalties
- Date: 8 May 2006
- Venue: Pasienky, Bratislava
- Referee: Ľuboš Micheľ
- Attendance: 8,426

The 2006 Slovak Cup final was the final match of the 2005–06 Slovak Cup, the 37th season of the top cup competition in Slovak football. The match was played at the Pasienky in Bratislava on 8 May 2006 between FC Spartak Trnava and MFK Ružomberok. Ružomberok defeated Spartak Trnava on penalties 4-3, after match ended 0:0.

== Route to the final ==
FC Spartak Trnava		Round	MFK Ružomberok
Opponent	Result	2005–06 Slovak Cup	Opponent	Result
DAC Dunajská Streda	2-1 home	First Round	HFC Humenné	3-0 home
MFK Košice	1-0 home	Second Round	Matador Púchov	1-0 home
ŠK Eldus Močenok	4–0 away, 1-0 home	Quarter-finals	AS Trenčín	3-0 away, 0-0 home
FC Nitra	3–1 away, 1-1 home	Semi-finals	Artmedia Bratislava	2–0 home, 0-2 (6:5 pen.) away

== Match ==
=== Details ===
8 May 2006
16:30 CEST

Spartak Trnava	0–0	MFK Ružomberok
	Report
Penalties
Čvirik (penalty scored); Labant (penalty scored); Kožuch (penalty scored); Kopúnek (penalty missed); Ďuriš (penalty missed); Hrabal (penalty missed)	3–4	(penalty scored) Žofčák; (penalty missed) Sapara; (penalty scored) Urban; (penalty scored) Dovičovič; (penalty missed) Jendrišek; (penalty scored) Nezmar

Pasienky, Bratislava
Attendance: 8,426
Referee: Ľuboš Micheľ

FC Spartak Trnava	MFK Ružomberok

FC SPARTAK TRNAVA:
GK	(Slovakia) Miroslav Hrdina
RB	(Senegal) Souleymane Fall	(substituted off) 60'
CB	(Slovakia) Jaroslav Hrabal
CB	(Slovakia) Martin Poljovka (c)
LB	(Slovakia) Peter Čvirik
MF	(Slovakia) Dalibor Semanko	(yellow card) 19'
MF	(Slovakia) Peter Ďuriš	(yellow card) 61'
MF	(Slovakia) Kamil Kopúnek
LM	(Slovakia) Martin Husár	(substituted off) 82'
AM	(Slovakia) Miroslav Kriss	(substituted off) 55'
FW	(Slovakia) Vladimír Kožuch
Substitutions:
DF	(Slovakia) Vladimír Labant	(substituted in) 82'
ST	(Slovakia) M. Molnár	(substituted in) 60'
MF	(Slovakia) Andrej Filip	(substituted in) 55'
Manager:
Jozef Adamec

MFK RUŽOMBEROK:
GK	(Slovakia) Ľuboš Hajdúch
RB	(Czech Republic) Jiří Pospíšil	(substituted off) 106'
CB	(Czech Republic) Josef Dvorník
CB	(Slovakia) Martin Laurinc	(yellow card) 5'
LB	(Czech Republic) David Kotrys
DM	(Czech Republic) Pavel Zbožínek	(substituted off) 64'
RM	(Slovakia) Igor Žofčák
MF	(Slovakia) Marek Sapara
LM	(Slovakia) Miroslav Božok	(substituted off) 71'
FW	(Slovakia) Erik Jendrišek	(yellow card) 45'
FW	(Czech Republic) Jan Nezmar
Substitutions:
MF	(Slovakia) Juraj Dovičovič	(substituted in) 64'
MF	(Slovakia) Rudolf Urban	(substituted in) 106'
CF	(Slovakia) Tomáš Ďubek	(substituted in) 71'
Manager:
František Komňacký

Assistant referees:
(Slovakia) Roman Slyško
(Slovakia) Martin Balko
