= 2005–06 Slovak Cup =

Tournament details
- Country: Slovakia
- Teams: 30

Final positions
- Champions: Ružomberok
- Runners-up: Spartak Trnava

The 2005–06 Slovak Cup was the 37th season of Slovakia's annual knock-out cup competition and the thirteenth since the independence of Slovakia. It began on 2 August 2005 with the matches of first round and ended on 8 May 2006 with the final. The winners of the competition earned a place in the first qualifying round of the UEFA Cup. Dukla Banská Bystrica were the defending champions.

== First round ==
The seven games were played on 2 August 2005 and the seven games were played on 3 August 2005.

Team 1	Score	Team 2
FC Lamač Bratislava	1–6	FC Nitra
Spartak Trnava	2–1	DAC Dunajská Streda
FC Nitra II	0–6	Inter Bratislava
MFK Ružomberok	3–0	HFC Humenné
Podbrezová	1–0	Tatran Prešov
Odeva Lipany	1–0	LAFC Lučenec
FK Košice-Barca	0–4	MFK Košice
Eldus Močenok	3–0	ViOn Zlaté Moravce
Slovan Bratislava	0–0 (5–6 p)	Matador Púchov
Slovan Duslo Šaľa	2–1	ZTS Dubnica nad Váhom
Spartak Trnava II	0–1	AS Trenčín
Družstevník Báč	0–3	FC Senec
Rimavská Sobota	1–1 (6–5 p)	Zemplín Michalovce
ŠK Aqua Turčianske Teplice	1–8	MŠK Žilina

== Second round ==
The four games were played on 30 August 2005 and the four games were played on 31 August 2005.

Team 1	Score	Team 2
Podbrezová	1–2	FC Senec
Slovan Duslo Šaľa	3–0	Odeva Lipany
MFK Ružomberok	1–0	Matador Púchov
Spartak Trnava	1–0	MFK Košice
Inter Bratislava	0–2	Artmedia Bratislava
FC Nitra	1–1 (5-3 p)	MŠK Žilina
AS Trenčín	3–0	Dukla Banská Bystrica
Eldus Močenok	3–0	Rimavská Sobota

== Quarter-finals ==
The first legs were played on 18 October 2005 with the exception of Artmedia Bratislava – FC Senec, which was played on 5 October 2005. The second legs were played on 25 October 2005.

=== First legs ===
5 October 2005	Artmedia Petržalka	1–0	FC Senec	Bratislava
16:00	Obžera 48'	Report		Stadium: Štadión Petržalka; Attendance: 1,185; Referee: Pavel Olšiak

18 October 2005	Slovan Duslo Šaľa	2–2	FC Nitra	Šaľa
14:00	Vencel 10'; Lancz 74'	Report	Hrnčár 86'; Rák 89'	Stadium: Šaľa Stadium; Attendance: 752; Referee: Peter Mriglot

18 October 2005	Eldus Močenok	0–4	Spartak Trnava	Močenok
14:00		Report	Kožuch 14'; Kriss 16'; Semanko 48'; Filip 90+'	Stadium: Štadión ŠK Eldus Močenok; Attendance: 1,800; Referee: Vladimír Hriňák

18 October 2005	AS Trenčín	0–3	MFK Ružomberok	Trenčín
17:00		Report	Pospíšil 56'; Nezmar 89', 90'	Stadium: Štadión na Sihoti; Attendance: 522; Referee: Ľuboš Micheľ

=== Second legs ===
25 October 2005	FC Nitra	2–1 (4–3 agg.)	Slovan Duslo Šaľa	Nitra
14:00	Rák 10', 20'	Report	Lalák 70'	Stadium: Štadión pod Zoborom; Attendance: 451; Referee: Alexander Šulgan

25 October 2005	MFK Ružomberok	0–0 (3–0 agg.)	AS Trenčín	Ružomberok
14:00		Report		Stadium: Štadión pod Čebraťom; Attendance: 1,350; Referee: Miroslav Richtárik

25 October 2005	FC Senec	1–1 (1–2 agg.)	Artmedia Petržalka	Senec
17:00	Moughfire 55'	Report	Kozák 79'	Stadium: NTC Senec; Attendance: 1,425; Referee: Jozef Pavlík

25 October 2005	Spartak Trnava	1–0 (5–0 agg.)	Eldus Močenok	Trnava
17:00	Ďuriš 27'	Report		Stadium: Anton Malatinský Stadium; Attendance: 1,653; Referee: Pavol Šuniar

== Semi-finals ==
The first legs were played on 28 and 29 March 2006. The second legs were played on 11 and 12 April 2006.

=== First legs ===
28 March 2006	FC Nitra	1–3	Spartak Trnava	Nitra
15:30	Dobiáš 49'	Report	Čvirik 13' (pen.); Semanko 50', 75'	Stadium: Štadión pod Zoborom; Attendance: 2,010; Referee: Vladimír Hriňák

29 March 2006	MFK Ružomberok	2–0	Artmedia Petržalka	Ružomberok
15:30	Dvorník 28'; Jendrišek 86'	Report		Stadium: Štadión pod Čebraťom; Attendance: 1,980; Referee: Ľuboš Micheľ

=== Second legs ===
11 April 2006	Spartak Trnava	1–1 (4–2 agg.)	FC Nitra	Trnava
17:30	Blaha 9'	Report	Grajciar 63'	Stadium: Anton Malatinský Stadium; Attendance: 3,987; Referee: Ľuboš Micheľ

12 April 2006	Artmedia Petržalka	2–0 (2–2 agg.) (5−6 p)	MFK Ružomberok	Bratislava
16:00	Reiter 8', 35'	Report		Stadium: Štadión Petržalka; Attendance: 1,795; Referee: Pavel Olšiak
	Penalties
	Fodrek (penalty scored); Halenár (penalty missed); Urbánek (penalty scored); Čišovský (penalty scored); Reiter (penalty scored); Kubala (penalty scored); Straka (penalty missed)		(penalty scored) Sapara; (penalty scored) Jendrišek; (penalty missed) Pospíšil; (penalty scored) Laurinc; (penalty scored) Nezmar; (penalty scored) Božok; (penalty scored) Siva

== Final ==
8 May 2006
16:30 CEST

Spartak Trnava	0–0	MFK Ružomberok
	Report
Penalties
Čvirik (penalty scored); Labant (penalty scored); Kožuch (penalty scored); Kopúnek (penalty missed); Ďuriš (penalty missed); Hrabal (penalty missed)	3–4	(penalty scored) Žofčák; (penalty missed) Sapara; (penalty scored) Urban; (penalty scored) Dovičovič; (penalty missed) Jendrišek; (penalty scored) Nezmar

Pasienky, Bratislava
Attendance: 8,426
Referee: Ľuboš Micheľ
