= 2010 FIFA World Cup Group F =

Football tournament group stage

Group F of the 2010 FIFA World Cup began on 14 June 2010 and ended on 24 June 2010. The group consisted of 2006 winner Italy, Paraguay, New Zealand and Slovakia. Italy and Paraguay previously met in the first round of the 1950 tournament, with Italy winning 2–0; neither qualified for the next round.

Italy were eliminated from the group with just two points, behind underdogs New Zealand, who drew all three of their matches to finish on three points. New Zealand ended up being the only unbeaten team at this World Cup, as eventual champions Spain lost to Switzerland in their Group H game while Japan and Ghana who both failed to advance on penalties in the knockout stage had previously lost a group game. Italy placed last, making it the first time since 1974 that the Italians did not advance beyond the first round and the first tournament they didn’t win a World Cup match.

== Standings ==
Pos	Team	Pld	W	D	L	GF	GA	GD	Pts	Qualification
1	Paraguay	3	1	2	0	3	1	+2	5	Advance to knockout stage
2	Slovakia	3	1	1	1	4	5	−1	4	Advance to knockout stage
3	New Zealand	3	0	3	0	2	2	0	3	
4	Italy	3	0	2	1	4	5	−1	2	

Source: FIFA
Rules for classification: Tie-breaking criteria
- Paraguay advanced to play Japan (runner-up of Group E) in the round of 16.
- Slovakia advanced to play Netherlands (winner of Group E) in the round of 16.

== Matches ==
All times local (UTC+2)

=== Italy vs Paraguay ===
Italy entered the fixture as defending champions, having won the 2006 edition of the tournament, and their starting lineup featured five of their World Cup winning team.

Paraguay defender Antolín Alcaraz put his team in front on 39 minutes with a well-timed header. Veteran Italy goalkeeper Gianluigi Buffon was substituted off at half-time, with what appeared to be back injury.

Half-way through the second half, an error from Paraguay goalkeeper Justo Villar allowed Italy midfielder Daniele De Rossi to score an equaliser.

14 June 2010
20:30

Italy	1–1	Paraguay
De Rossi 63'		Alcaraz 39'

Cape Town Stadium, Cape Town
Attendance: 62,869
Referee: Benito Archundia (Mexico)

Italy	Paraguay

GK	1	Gianluigi Buffon		(substituted off) 46'
RB	19	Gianluca Zambrotta
CB	5	Fabio Cannavaro (c)
CB	4	Giorgio Chiellini
LB	3	Domenico Criscito
CM	6	Daniele De Rossi
CM	22	Riccardo Montolivo
AM	15	Claudio Marchisio		(substituted off) 59'
RW	7	Simone Pepe
LW	9	Vincenzo Iaquinta
CF	11	Alberto Gilardino		(substituted off) 72'
Substitutions:
GK	12	Federico Marchetti		(substituted on) 46'
MF	16	Mauro Camoranesi	(yellow card) 70'	(substituted on) 59'
FW	10	Antonio Di Natale		(substituted on) 72'
Manager:
Marcello Lippi

GK	1	Justo Villar (c)
RB	6	Carlos Bonet
CB	21	Antolín Alcaraz
CB	14	Paulo da Silva
LB	3	Claudio Morel
DM	15	Víctor Cáceres	(yellow card) 62'
RM	13	Enrique Vera
CM	16	Cristian Riveros
LM	17	Aureliano Torres		(substituted off) 60'
SS	18	Nelson Valdez		(substituted off) 68'
CF	19	Lucas Barrios		(substituted off) 76'
Substitutions:
MF	11	Jonathan Santana		(substituted on) 60'
FW	9	Roque Santa Cruz		(substituted on) 68'
FW	7	Óscar Cardozo		(substituted on) 76'
Manager:
(Argentina) Gerardo Martino

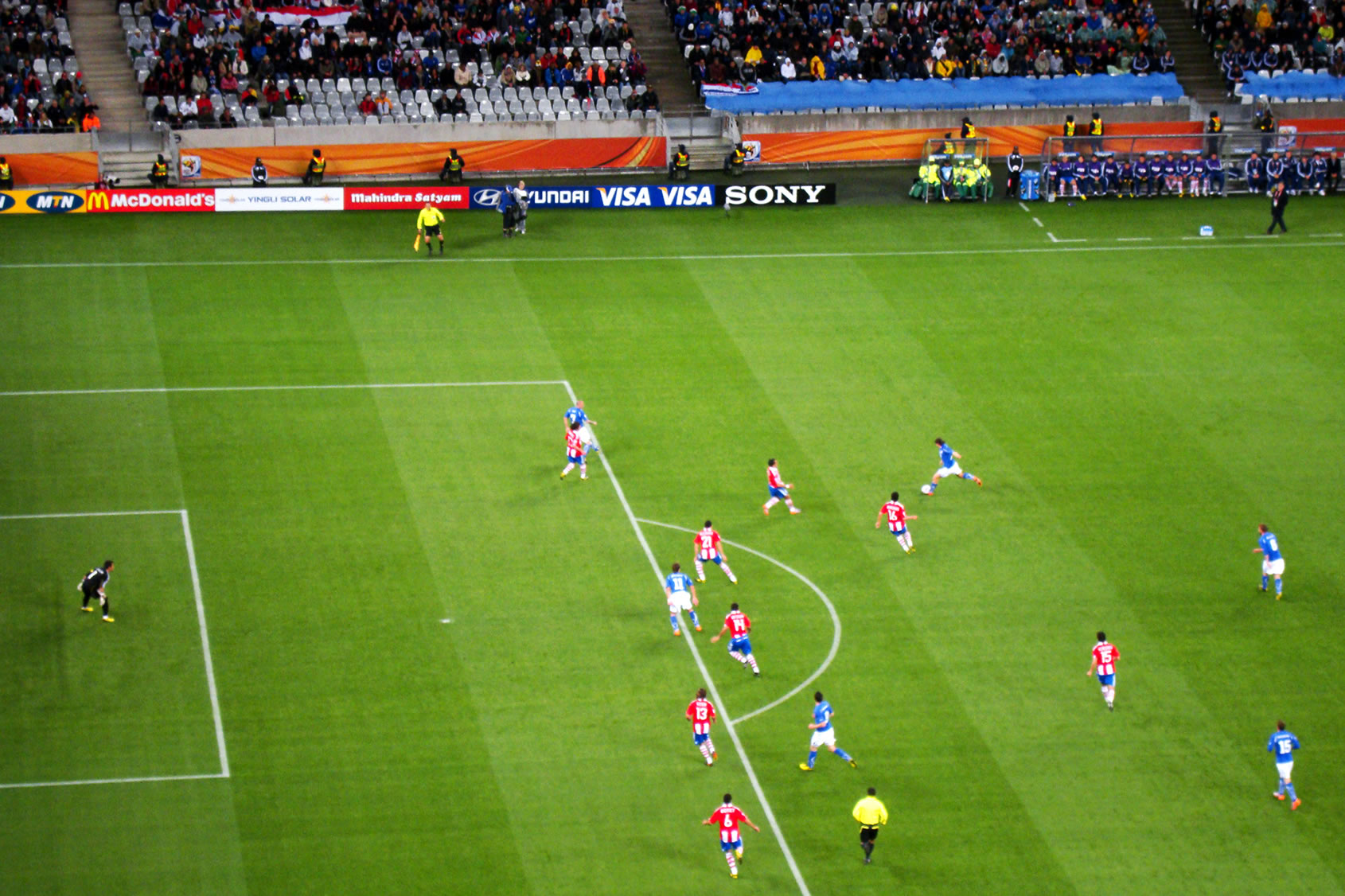
Italy vs Paraguay

Man of the Match:
Antolín Alcaraz (Paraguay)

Assistant referees:
Héctor Vergara (Canada)
Marvin Torrentera (Mexico)
Fourth official:
Joel Aguilar (El Salvador)
Fifth official:
Juan Zumba (El Salvador)

=== New Zealand vs Slovakia ===
This was New Zealand's first World Cup game since their debut in the 1982 tournament, where they lost all three of their group games.

Slovakia went ahead early in the second half via striker Róbert Vittek. New Zealand struggled to create any clear cut chances of their own, however deep into stoppage time Winston Reid equalized for New Zealand via a header. The 1-1 draw was New Zealand's first ever point at the FIFA World Cup finals.

15 June 2010
13:30

New Zealand	1–1	Slovakia
Reid 90+3'		Vittek 50'

Royal Bafokeng Stadium, Rustenburg
Attendance: 23,871
Referee: Jerome Damon (South Africa)

New Zealand	Slovakia

GK	1	Mark Paston
RB	4	Winston Reid	(yellow card) 90+3'
CB	6	Ryan Nelsen (c)
CB	5	Ivan Vicelich		(substituted off) 78'
LB	19	Tommy Smith
RM	11	Leo Bertos
CM	7	Simon Elliott
LM	3	Tony Lochhead	(yellow card) 42'
RW	14	Rory Fallon
LW	10	Chris Killen		(substituted off) 72'
CF	9	Shane Smeltz
Substitutions:
FW	20	Chris Wood		(substituted on) 72'
MF	21	Jeremy Christie		(substituted on) 78'
Manager:
Ricki Herbert

GK	1	Ján Mucha
RB	5	Radoslav Zabavník
CB	16	Ján Ďurica
CB	3	Martin Škrtel
LB	4	Marek Čech
DM	6	Zdeno Štrba	(yellow card) 55'
RM	7	Vladimír Weiss		(substituted off) 90+1'
CM	9	Stanislav Šesták		(substituted off) 81'
LM	17	Marek Hamšík (c)
CF	11	Róbert Vittek		(substituted off) 84'
CF	18	Erik Jendrišek
Substitutions:
FW	13	Filip Hološko		(substituted on) 81'
MF	15	Miroslav Stoch		(substituted on) 84'
MF	19	Juraj Kucka		(substituted on) 90+1'
Manager:
Vladimír Weiss

Man of the Match:
Róbert Vittek (Slovakia)

Assistant referees:
Celestin Ntagungira (Rwanda)
Enock Molefe (South Africa)
Fourth official:
Ravshan Irmatov (Uzbekistan)
Fifth official:
Rafael Ilyasov (Uzbekistan)

=== Slovakia vs Paraguay ===
20 June 2010
13:30

Slovakia	0–2	Paraguay
		Vera 27'; Riveros 86'

Free State Stadium, Bloemfontein
Attendance: 26,643
Referee: Eddy Maillet (Seychelles)

Slovakia	Paraguay

GK	1	Ján Mucha
RB	2	Peter Pekarík
CB	3	Martin Škrtel
CB	21	Kornel Saláta		(substituted off) 83'
LB	16	Ján Ďurica	(yellow card) 42'
DM	6	Zdeno Štrba
CM	17	Marek Hamšík (c)
RW	9	Stanislav Šesták	(yellow card) 47'	(substituted off) 70'
LW	7	Vladimír Weiss	(yellow card) 84'
SS	8	Ján Kozák
CF	11	Róbert Vittek
Substitutions:
FW	13	Filip Hološko		(substituted on) 70'
MF	15	Miroslav Stoch		(substituted on) 83'
Manager:
Vladimír Weiss

GK	1	Justo Villar (c)
RB	6	Carlos Bonet
CB	14	Paulo da Silva
CB	21	Antolín Alcaraz
LB	3	Claudio Morel
DM	15	Víctor Cáceres
CM	13	Enrique Vera	(yellow card) 45'	(substituted off) 88'
CM	16	Cristian Riveros
AM	18	Nelson Valdez		(substituted off) 68'
SS	9	Roque Santa Cruz
CF	19	Lucas Barrios		(substituted off) 82'
Substitutions:
DF	17	Aureliano Torres		(substituted on) 68'
FW	7	Óscar Cardozo		(substituted on) 82'
MF	8	Édgar Barreto		(substituted on) 88'
Manager:
(Argentina) Gerardo Martino

Man of the Match:
Enrique Vera (Paraguay)

Assistant referees:
Evarist Menkouande (Cameroon)
Bechir Hassani (Tunisia)
Fourth official:
Joel Aguilar (El Salvador)
Fifth official:
Juan Zumba (El Salvador)

=== Italy vs New Zealand ===
New Zealand took a surprise early lead when Simon Elliott's free-kick into the Italy penalty box was flicked on by defender Winston Reid, allowing striker Shane Smeltz to poke the ball into the Italy goal. The goal ended up being New Zealand's only shot on goal for the entire match.

New Zealand conceded a penalty on half an hour when Tommy Smith tussled with Italy midfielder Daniele De Rossi, allowing Italy to equalize. Italy pushed for a winning goal in the second half but were unable to score, and the game finished 1-1. The result meant that after their opening two games, New Zealand had the same number of points as reigning World Cup champions Italy.

The draw extended Italy's winless run to five games, consisting of four draws and a 2-1 loss to Mexico in a World Cup warmup. For New Zealand, it was only their second ever point at the World Cup, having also drawn their opening game to Slovakia by the same score.

20 June 2010
16:00

Italy	1–1	New Zealand
Iaquinta 29' (pen.)		Smeltz 7'

Mbombela Stadium, Nelspruit
Attendance: 38,229
Referee: Carlos Batres (Guatemala)

Italy	New Zealand

GK	12	Federico Marchetti
RB	19	Gianluca Zambrotta
CB	5	Fabio Cannavaro (c)
CB	4	Giorgio Chiellini
LB	3	Domenico Criscito
RM	7	Simone Pepe	(substituted off) 46'
CM	6	Daniele De Rossi
CM	22	Riccardo Montolivo
LM	15	Claudio Marchisio	(substituted off) 61'
SS	9	Vincenzo Iaquinta
CF	11	Alberto Gilardino	(substituted off) 46'
Substitutions:
MF	16	Mauro Camoranesi	(substituted on) 46'
FW	10	Antonio Di Natale	(substituted on) 46'
FW	20	Giampaolo Pazzini	(substituted on) 61'
Manager:
Marcello Lippi

GK	1	Mark Paston
RB	4	Winston Reid
CB	6	Ryan Nelsen (c)	(yellow card) 87'
CB	5	Ivan Vicelich		(substituted off) 81'
LB	19	Tommy Smith	(yellow card) 28'
RM	11	Leo Bertos
CM	7	Simon Elliott
LM	3	Tony Lochhead
RW	14	Rory Fallon	(yellow card) 14'	(substituted off) 63'
LW	10	Chris Killen		(substituted off) 90+3'
CF	9	Shane Smeltz
Substitutions:
FW	20	Chris Wood		(substituted on) 63'
MF	21	Jeremy Christie		(substituted on) 81'
MF	13	Andrew Barron		(substituted on) 90+3'
Manager:
Ricki Herbert

Man of the Match:
Daniele De Rossi (Italy)

Assistant referees:
Leonel Leal (Costa Rica)
Carlos Pastrana (Honduras)
Fourth official:
Koman Coulibaly (Mali)
Fifth official:
Redouane Achik (Morocco)

=== Slovakia vs Italy ===
24 June 2010
16:00

Slovakia	3–2	Italy
Vittek 25', 73'; Kopúnek 89'		Di Natale 81'; Quagliarella 90+2'

Ellis Park Stadium, Johannesburg
Attendance: 53,412
Referee: Howard Webb (England)

Slovakia	Italy

GK	1	Ján Mucha	(yellow card) 82'
RB	2	Peter Pekarík	(yellow card) 50'
CB	3	Martin Škrtel
CB	16	Ján Ďurica
LB	5	Radoslav Zabavník
RM	17	Marek Hamšík (c)
CM	6	Zdeno Štrba	(yellow card) 16'	(substituted off) 87'
CM	19	Juraj Kucka
LM	15	Miroslav Stoch
SS	11	Róbert Vittek	(yellow card) 40'	(substituted off) 90+2'
CF	18	Erik Jendrišek		(substituted off) 90+4'
Substitutions:
MF	20	Kamil Kopúnek		(substituted on) 87'
MF	9	Stanislav Šesták		(substituted on) 90+2'
DF	22	Martin Petráš		(substituted on) 90+4'
Manager:
Vladimír Weiss

GK	12	Federico Marchetti
RB	19	Gianluca Zambrotta
CB	5	Fabio Cannavaro (c)	(yellow card) 31'
CB	4	Giorgio Chiellini	(yellow card) 67'
LB	3	Domenico Criscito		(substituted off) 46'
DM	6	Daniele De Rossi
CM	8	Gennaro Gattuso		(substituted off) 46'
CM	22	Riccardo Montolivo		(substituted off) 56'
RW	7	Simone Pepe	(yellow card) 76'
LW	10	Antonio Di Natale
CF	9	Vincenzo Iaquinta
Substitutions:
DF	2	Christian Maggio		(substituted on) 46'
FW	18	Fabio Quagliarella	(yellow card) 83'	(substituted on) 46'
MF	21	Andrea Pirlo		(substituted on) 56'
Manager:
Marcello Lippi

Man of the Match:
Róbert Vittek (Slovakia)

Assistant referees:
Darren Cann (England)
Michael Mullarkey (England)
Fourth official:
Stéphane Lannoy (France)
Fifth official:
Eric Dansault (France)

=== Paraguay vs New Zealand ===
Paraguay qualified for the round of 16 for the fourth time in their history after being held to a 0–0 draw by New Zealand.

With their third successive draw, New Zealand concluded their campaign undefeated above World Cup holders Italy, but failed to qualify for the round of 16 by a single point.

24 June 2010
16:00

Paraguay	0–0	New Zealand

Peter Mokaba Stadium, Polokwane
Attendance: 34,850
Referee: Yuichi Nishimura (Japan)

Paraguay	New Zealand

GK	1	Justo Villar
RB	4	Denis Caniza (c)
CB	5	Julio Cáceres
CB	14	Paulo da Silva
LB	3	Claudio Morel
DM	15	Víctor Cáceres	(yellow card) 10'
RM	16	Cristian Riveros
LM	13	Enrique Vera
AM	9	Roque Santa Cruz	(yellow card) 41'
AM	18	Nelson Valdez		(substituted off) 67'
CF	7	Óscar Cardozo		(substituted off) 66'
Substitutions:
FW	19	Lucas Barrios		(substituted on) 66'
FW	10	Édgar Benítez		(substituted on) 67'
Manager:
(Argentina) Gerardo Martino

GK	1	Mark Paston
RB	4	Winston Reid
CB	6	Ryan Nelsen (c)	(yellow card) 56'
LB	19	Tommy Smith
CM	7	Simon Elliott
CM	5	Ivan Vicelich
RM	11	Leo Bertos
LM	3	Tony Lochhead
AM	10	Chris Killen		(substituted off) 79'
AM	9	Shane Smeltz
CF	14	Rory Fallon		(substituted off) 69'
Substitutions:
FW	20	Chris Wood		(substituted on) 69'
MF	22	Jeremy Brockie		(substituted on) 79'
Manager:
Ricki Herbert

Man of the Match:
Roque Santa Cruz (Paraguay)

Assistant referees:
Toru Sagara (Japan)
Jeong Hae-sang (South Korea)
Fourth official:
Koman Coulibaly (Mali)
Fifth official:
Inácio Cândido (Angola)

== See also ==
- Italy at the FIFA World Cup
- New Zealand at the FIFA World Cup
- Paraguay at the FIFA World Cup
- Slovakia at the FIFA World Cup
