= Slovakia at the FIFA World Cup =

International football delegation

This is a record of Slovakia's results at the FIFA World Cup, including those of Czechoslovakia which is considered as both theirs and the Czech Republic's predecessor by FIFA. The FIFA World Cup is an international association football competition contested by the men's national teams of the members of Fédération Internationale de Football Association (FIFA), the sport's global governing body. The championship has been awarded every four years since the first tournament in 1930, except in 1942 and 1946, due to World War II.

The tournament consists of two parts, the qualification phase and the final phase (officially called the World Cup Finals). The qualification phase, which currently takes place over the three years preceding the Finals, is used to determine which teams qualify for the Finals. The current format of the Finals involves 48 teams competing for the title, at venues within the host nation (or nations) for about a month. The World Cup final is the most widely viewed sporting event in the world, with an estimated 715.1 million people watching the 2006 tournament final.

Czechoslovakia has been one of the better performing national teams in the history of the World Cup, having ended twice as runners-up, in 1934 and in 1962. Between 1930 and 1994 they qualified for 8 out of 13 World Cups they played qualifiers for, and did not enter in two other World Cups.

After the political and peaceful split-up into the Czech Republic and Slovakia, the official successor football teams of the Czech Republic and Slovakia have been less successful at the World Cup than Czechoslovakia, qualifying only for one out of the seven tournaments held since (the 2010 FIFA World Cup) without surviving the group phase and got eliminated in the last 16 respectively.

Throughout the World Cup history, Brazil became the team's historical rival. The two countries have met each other five times but the Czechs and Slovaks (always Czechoslovakia) never won, with three victories for the Brazilian side and two draws. Two other historical opponents in the finals were (West) Germany and Italy with three encounters each: Czechoslovakia won, drew and lost once against the Germans and the matches against Italy all ended in a defeat.

== FIFA World Cup record ==
FIFA World Cup record										Qualification record						
Year	Result	Position	Pld	W	D	L	GF	GA	Squad	Pld	W	D	L	GF	GA	Q
as Czechoslovakia										as Czechoslovakia						
(Uruguay) 1930	Did not enter									Declined invitation						
(Italy) 1934	Runners-up	2nd	4	3	0	1	9	6	Squad	1	1	0	0	2	1	1934
(France) 1938	Quarter-finals	5th	3	1	1	1	5	3	Squad	2	1	1	0	7	1	1938
(Brazil) 1950	Did not enter									Did not enter						
(Switzerland) 1954	Group stage	14th	2	0	0	2	0	7	Squad	4	3	1	0	5	1	1954
(Sweden) 1958	Group stage	9th	4	1	1	2	9	6	Squad	4	3	0	1	9	3	1958
(Chile) 1962	Runners-up	2nd	6	3	1	2	7	7	Squad	5	4	0	1	20	7	1962
(England) 1966	Did not qualify									6	3	1	2	12	4	1966
(Mexico) 1970	Group stage	15th	3	0	0	3	2	7	Squad	7	5	1	1	16	7	1970
(West Germany) 1974	Did not qualify									4	2	1	1	9	3	1974
(Argentina) 1978	Did not qualify									4	2	0	2	4	6	1978
(Spain) 1982	Group stage	19th	3	0	2	1	2	4	Squad	8	4	2	2	15	6	1982
(Mexico) 1986	Did not qualify									8	3	2	3	11	12	1986
(Italy) 1990	Quarter-finals	6th	5	3	0	2	10	5	Squad	8	5	2	1	13	3	1990
(United States) 1994	Did not qualify									10	4	5	1	21	9	1994
as Slovakia										as Slovakia						
(France) 1998	Did not qualify									10	5	1	4	18	14	1998
(South Korea) (Japan) 2002	Did not qualify									10	5	2	3	16	9	2002
(Germany) 2006	Did not qualify									14	6	6	2	26	14	2006
(South Africa) 2010	Round of 16	16th	4	1	1	2	5	7	Squad	10	7	1	2	22	10	2010
(Brazil) 2014	Did not qualify									10	3	4	3	11	10	2014
(Russia) 2018	Did not qualify									10	6	0	4	17	7	2018
(Qatar) 2022	Did not qualify									10	3	5	2	17	10	2022
(Canada) (Mexico) (United States) 2026	Did not qualify									7	4	0	3	9	12	2026
(Morocco) (Portugal) (Spain) 2030	To be determined									To be determined						
(Saudi Arabia) 2034	To be determined									To be determined						
Total	Round of 16	1/9	34	12	6	16	49	52	–	152	79	35	38	280	149	–

List of FIFA World Cup matches
Year	Round	Score	Result	Slovakia goalscorers
2010	Round 1	New Zealand 1 – 1 Slovakia	Draw	Vittek
2010	Round 1	Slovakia 0 – 2 Paraguay	Loss	
2010	Round 1	Slovakia 3 – 2 Italy	Win	Vittek (2), Kopúnek
2010	Round of 16	Netherlands 2 – 1 Slovakia	Loss	Vittek

== Slovakia at the 2010 FIFA World Cup ==
Slovakia were drawn in group F of the 2010 FIFA World Cup.

Pos	Team	Pld	W	D	L	GF	GA	GD	Pts	Qualification
1	Paraguay	3	1	2	0	3	1	+2	5	Advance to knockout stage
2	Slovakia	3	1	1	1	4	5	−1	4	Advance to knockout stage
3	New Zealand	3	0	3	0	2	2	0	3	
4	Italy	3	0	2	1	4	5	−1	2	

Source: FIFA
Rules for classification: Tie-breaking criteria

Coach: Vladimír Weiss

No.	Pos.	Player	Date of birth (age)	Caps	Club
1	GK	Ján Mucha	5 December 1982 (aged 27)	14	(Poland) Legia Warszawa
2	DF	Peter Pekarík	30 October 1986 (aged 23)	21	(Germany) VfL Wolfsburg
3	DF	Martin Škrtel	15 December 1984 (aged 25)	37	(England) Liverpool
4	DF	Marek Čech	26 January 1983 (aged 27)	38	(England) West Bromwich Albion
5	DF	Radoslav Zabavník	16 September 1980 (aged 29)	42	(Germany) Mainz 05
6	MF	Zdeno Štrba	9 June 1976 (aged 34)	20	(Greece) Skoda Xanthi
7	MF	Vladimír Weiss	30 November 1989 (aged 20)	7	(England) Bolton Wanderers
8	MF	Ján Kozák	22 April 1980 (aged 30)	22	(Romania) Timişoara
9	MF	Stanislav Šesták	16 December 1982 (aged 27)	29	(Germany) VfL Bochum
10	MF	Marek Sapara	31 July 1982 (aged 27)	24	(Turkey) Ankaragücü
11	FW	Róbert Vittek	1 April 1982 (aged 28)	69	(Turkey) Ankaragücü
12	GK	Dušan Perniš	28 November 1984 (aged 25)	1	(Scotland) Dundee United
13	FW	Filip Hološko	17 January 1984 (aged 26)	37	(Turkey) Beşiktaş
14	FW	Martin Jakubko	26 February 1980 (aged 30)	21	(Russia) Saturn Moscow Oblast
15	MF	Miroslav Stoch	19 October 1989 (aged 20)	10	(Netherlands) Twente
16	DF	Ján Ďurica	10 December 1981 (aged 28)	35	(Germany) Hannover 96
17	MF	Marek Hamšík (c)	27 July 1987 (aged 22)	30	(Italy) Napoli
18	FW	Erik Jendrišek	26 October 1986 (aged 23)	13	(Germany) 1. FC Kaiserslautern
19	MF	Juraj Kucka	26 February 1987 (aged 23)	5	(Czech Republic) Sparta Prague
20	MF	Kamil Kopúnek	18 May 1984 (aged 26)	7	(Slovakia) Spartak Trnava
21	DF	Kornel Saláta	4 January 1985 (aged 25)	3	(Slovakia) Slovan Bratislava
22	DF	Martin Petráš	2 November 1979 (aged 30)	38	(Italy) Cesena
23	GK	Dušan Kuciak	21 May 1985 (aged 25)	2	(Romania) FC Vaslui

=== New Zealand vs Slovakia ===
15 June 2010
13:30

New Zealand	1–1	Slovakia
Reid 90+3'	Report	Vittek 50'

Royal Bafokeng Stadium, Rustenburg
Attendance: 23,871
Referee: Jerome Damon (South Africa)

New Zealand	Slovakia

GK	1	Mark Paston
RB	4	Winston Reid	(yellow card) 90+3'
CB	6	Ryan Nelsen (c)
CB	5	Ivan Vicelich		(substituted off) 78'
LB	19	Tommy Smith
RM	11	Leo Bertos
CM	7	Simon Elliott
LM	3	Tony Lochhead	(yellow card) 42'
RW	14	Rory Fallon
LW	10	Chris Killen		(substituted off) 72'
CF	9	Shane Smeltz
Substitutions:
FW	20	Chris Wood		(substituted on) 72'
MF	21	Jeremy Christie		(substituted on) 78'
Manager:
Ricki Herbert

GK	1	Ján Mucha
RB	5	Radoslav Zabavník
CB	16	Ján Ďurica
CB	3	Martin Škrtel
LB	4	Marek Čech
DM	6	Zdeno Štrba	(yellow card) 55'
RM	7	Vladimír Weiss		(substituted off) 90+1'
CM	9	Stanislav Šesták		(substituted off) 81'
LM	17	Marek Hamšík (c)
CF	11	Róbert Vittek		(substituted off) 84'
CF	18	Erik Jendrišek
Substitutions:
FW	13	Filip Hološko		(substituted on) 81'
MF	15	Miroslav Stoch		(substituted on) 84'
MF	19	Juraj Kucka		(substituted on) 90+1'
Manager:
Vladimír Weiss

Man of the Match:
Róbert Vittek (Slovakia)

Assistant referees:
Celestin Ntagungira (Rwanda)
Enock Molefe (South Africa)
Fourth official:
Ravshan Irmatov (Uzbekistan)
Fifth official:
Rafael Ilyasov (Uzbekistan)

=== Slovakia vs Paraguay ===
20 June 2010
13:30

Slovakia	0–2	Paraguay
	Report	Vera 27'; Riveros 86'

Free State Stadium, Bloemfontein
Attendance: 26,643
Referee: Eddy Maillet (Seychelles)

Slovakia	Paraguay

SLOVAKIA:
GK	1	Ján Mucha
RB	2	Peter Pekarík
CB	3	Martin Škrtel
CB	21	Kornel Saláta		(substituted off) 83'
LB	16	Ján Ďurica	(yellow card) 42'
DM	6	Zdeno Štrba
CM	17	Marek Hamšík (c)
RW	9	Stanislav Šesták	(yellow card) 47'	(substituted off) 70'
LW	7	Vladimír Weiss	(yellow card) 84'
SS	8	Ján Kozák
CF	11	Róbert Vittek
Substitutions:
FW	13	Filip Hološko		(substituted on) 70'
MF	15	Miroslav Stoch		(substituted on) 83'
Manager:
Vladimír Weiss

PARAGUAY:
GK	1	Justo Villar (c)
RB	6	Carlos Bonet
CB	14	Paulo da Silva
CB	21	Antolín Alcaraz
LB	3	Claudio Morel
DM	15	Víctor Cáceres
CM	13	Enrique Vera	(yellow card) 45'	(substituted off) 88'
CM	16	Cristian Riveros
AM	18	Nelson Valdez		(substituted off) 68'
SS	9	Roque Santa Cruz
CF	19	Lucas Barrios		(substituted off) 82'
Substitutions:
DF	17	Aureliano Torres		(substituted on) 68'
FW	7	Óscar Cardozo		(substituted on) 82'
MF	8	Édgar Barreto		(substituted on) 88'
Manager:
Gerardo Martino

Man of the Match:
Enrique Vera (Paraguay)

Assistant referees:
Evarist Menkouande (Cameroon)
Bechir Hassani (Tunisia)
Fourth official:
Joel Aguilar (El Salvador)
Fifth official:
Juan Zumba (El Salvador)

=== Slovakia vs Italy ===
24 June 2010
16:00

Slovakia	3–2	Italy
Vittek 25', 73'; Kopúnek 89'	Report	Di Natale 81'; Quagliarella 90+2'

Ellis Park Stadium, Johannesburg
Attendance: 53,412
Referee: Howard Webb (England)

Slovakia	Italy

SLOVAKIA:
GK	1	Ján Mucha	(yellow card) 82'
RB	2	Peter Pekarík	(yellow card) 50'
CB	3	Martin Škrtel
CB	16	Ján Ďurica
LB	5	Radoslav Zabavník
DM	6	Zdeno Štrba	(yellow card) 16'	(substituted off) 87'
CM	19	Juraj Kucka
RM	17	Marek Hamšík (c)
LM	15	Miroslav Stoch
SS	11	Róbert Vittek	(yellow card) 40'	(substituted off) 90+2'
CF	18	Erik Jendrišek		(substituted off) 90+4'
Substitutions:
MF	20	Kamil Kopúnek		(substituted on) 87'
MF	9	Stanislav Šesták		(substituted on) 90+2'
DF	22	Martin Petráš		(substituted on) 90+4'
Manager:
Vladimír Weiss

ITALY:
GK	12	Federico Marchetti
RB	19	Gianluca Zambrotta
CB	5	Fabio Cannavaro (c)	(yellow card) 31'
CB	4	Giorgio Chiellini	(yellow card) 67'
LB	3	Domenico Criscito		(substituted off) 46'
DM	6	Daniele De Rossi
CM	8	Gennaro Gattuso		(substituted off) 46'
CM	22	Riccardo Montolivo		(substituted off) 56'
RW	7	Simone Pepe	(yellow card) 76'
LW	10	Antonio Di Natale
CF	9	Vincenzo Iaquinta
Substitutions:
DF	2	Christian Maggio		(substituted on) 46'
FW	18	Fabio Quagliarella	(yellow card) 83'	(substituted on) 46'
MF	21	Andrea Pirlo		(substituted on) 56'
Manager:
Marcello Lippi

Man of the Match:
Róbert Vittek (Slovakia)

Assistant referees:
Darren Cann (England)
Michael Mullarkey (England)
Fourth official:
Stéphane Lannoy (France)
Fifth official:
Eric Dansault (France)

=== Second Round - Netherlands vs Slovakia ===
The Netherlands and Slovakia played on 28 June 2010 at the Moses Mabhida Stadium in Durban. The Netherlands won 2–1. The Netherlands' first goal was an excellent individual effort from Arjen Robben in the 18th minute, taking on the Slovak defence with the ball before scoring from 25 yards. The Dutch had chances to extend their lead in the second half; Arjen Robben cut inside on his left foot just like he did when he scored the first goal, but this time the slovak goalkeeper Jan Mucha saved the shot going to his far post. The Slovaks also had 2 big opportunities to equalize but forced 2 great saves from Maarten Stekelenburg. The Dutch however in the 84th minute sealed their win, with Wesley Sneijder scoring off an assist from Dirk Kuyt into an unguarded net after Kuyt got the ball past the Slovak keeper. Róbert Vittek slotted a penalty kick late in stoppage time, but it was no more than a consolation goal for Slovakia. The penalty had been awarded for a trip on Vittek by the Dutch goalkeeper Maarten Stekelenburg. The Netherlands' win threatened to be overshadowed by Robin van Persie responding angrily to being substituted by coach Bert van Marwijk. Van Marwijk called a team meeting over the incident, and insisted later that there was no residual unrest in the squad.

28 June 2010
16:00

Netherlands	2–1	Slovakia
Robben 18'; Sneijder 84'	Report	Vittek 90' (pen.)

Moses Mabhida Stadium, Durban
Attendance: 61,962
Referee: Alberto Undiano Mallenco (Spain)

Netherlands	Slovakia

GK	1	Maarten Stekelenburg	(yellow card) 90+3'
RB	2	Gregory van der Wiel
CB	3	John Heitinga
CB	4	Joris Mathijsen
LB	5	Giovanni van Bronckhorst (c)
DM	6	Mark van Bommel
DM	8	Nigel de Jong
RW	7	Dirk Kuyt	(yellow card) 31'
AM	10	Wesley Sneijder		(substituted off) 90+2'
LW	11	Arjen Robben		(substituted off) 71'
CF	9	Robin van Persie		(substituted off) 80'
Substitutions:
FW	17	Eljero Elia		(substituted on) 71'
FW	21	Klaas-Jan Huntelaar		(substituted on) 80'
MF	20	Ibrahim Afellay		(substituted on) 90+2'
Manager:
Bert van Marwijk

GK	1	Ján Mucha
RB	2	Peter Pekarík
CB	3	Martin Škrtel	(yellow card) 84'
CB	16	Ján Ďurica
LB	5	Radoslav Zabavník		(substituted off) 88'
DM	19	Juraj Kucka	(yellow card) 40'
RM	7	Vladimír Weiss
LM	15	Miroslav Stoch
AM	17	Marek Hamšík (c)		(substituted off) 87'
CF	18	Erik Jendrišek		(substituted off) 71'
CF	11	Róbert Vittek
Substitutions:
MF	20	Kamil Kopúnek	(yellow card) 72'	(substituted on) 71'
MF	10	Marek Sapara		(substituted on) 87'
FW	14	Martin Jakubko		(substituted on) 88'
Manager:
Vladimír Weiss

Man of the Match:
Arjen Robben (Netherlands)

Assistant referees:
Fermín Martínez Ibánez (Spain)
Juan Carlos Yuste Jiménez (Spain)
Fourth official:
Stéphane Lannoy (France)
Fifth official:
Laurent Ugo (France)

== Player records ==
=== Most appearances ===
Excluding Czechoslovakia's records, six players played in all four of Slovakia's 2010 FIFA World Cup matches, making them record appearance holders at the tournament for the independent nation.

As Czechoslovakia

Rank	Player	Matches	World Cups
1	Ladislav Novák	12	1954, 1958 and 1962
2	Josef Masopust	10	1958 and 1962
3	Svatopluk Pluskal	9	1954, 1958 and 1962
3	Ján Popluhár	9	1958 and 1962
5	Andrej Kvašňák	8	1962 and 1970
6	Josef Košťálek	7	1934 and 1938
7	Oldřich Nejedlý	6	1934 and 1938
7	František Plánička	6	1934 and 1938
7	Adolf Scherer	6	1962
7	Viliam Schrojf	6	1962
7	Jozef Adamec	6	1962 and 1970

As Slovakia

Rank	Player	Matches	World Cups
1	Ján Ďurica	4	2010
1	Marek Hamšík	4	2010
1	Ján Mucha	4	2010
1	Martin Škrtel	4	2010
1	Miroslav Stoch	4	2010
1	Róbert Vittek	4	2010

=== Top goalscorers ===
As Czechoslovakia

Rank	Player	Goals	World Cups
1	Oldřich Nejedlý	7	1934 (5) and 1938 (2)
2	Tomáš Skuhravý	5	1990
3	Robert Vittek	4	2010
4	Zdeněk Zikán	3	1958
4	Adolf Scherer	3	1962
5	Antonín Puč	2	1934
5	Milan Dvořák	2	1958
5	Václav Hovorka	2	1958
5	Ladislav Petráš	2	1970
5	Antonín Panenka	2	1982
5	Michal Bílek	2	1990

== Head-to-head record ==
Opponent	Pld	W	D	L	GF	GA	GD	Win %
Italy	1	1	0	0	3	2	+1	100.00
Netherlands	1	0	0	1	1	2	−1	0.00
New Zealand	1	0	1	0	1	1	+0	0.00
Paraguay	1	0	0	1	0	2	−2	0.00
Total	4	1	1	2	5	7	−2	25.00

== See also ==
- Slovakia at the UEFA European Championship
