= 2006–07 Slovak Superliga =

Corgoň Liga
- Season: 2006–07
- Dates: 14 July 2006 – 30 May 2007
- Champions: MŠK Žilina
- Relegated: Inter Bratislava
- Champions League: MŠK Žilina
- UEFA Cup: Artmedia Bratislava; Zlaté Moravce
- Intertoto Cup: Slovan Bratislava
- Matches played: 180
- Goals scored: 456 (2.53 per match)
- Top goalscorer: Tomáš Oravec (16 goals)
- Average attendance: ▼2,602

The 2006–07 Slovak Superliga (known as the Slovak Corgoň Liga for sponsorship reasons) was the 14th season of first-tier football league in Slovakia, since its establishment in 1993. It began on 14 July 2006 and ended on 30 May 2007. MFK Ružomberok were the defending champions.

== Teams ==
A total of 12 teams was contested in the league, including 9 sides from the 2005–06 season and three promoted from the 2. Liga, due to the league's expansion.

Relegation for SK Matador Púchov to the 2006–07 1. Liga was confirmed on 27 May 2006. The one relegated team were replaced by MFK Košice, ŠK Slovan Bratislava and FC Senec.

=== Stadiums and locations ===
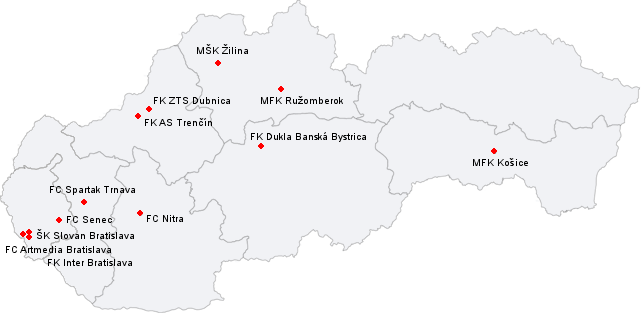
Location of teams in 2006–07 Corgoň Liga

Team	Home city	Stadium	Capacity
Artmedia Bratislava	Petržalka	Štadión Petržalka	7,500
FK AS Trenčín	Trenčín	Štadión na Sihoti	4,500
Dukla Banská Bystrica	Banská Bystrica	SNP Stadium	10,000
FK Inter Bratislava	Bratislava	Štadión Pasienky	12,000
FC Nitra	Nitra	Štadión pod Zoborom	11,384
MFK Košice	Košice	Lokomotíva Stadium	9,000
MFK Ružomberok	Ružomberok	Štadión MFK Ružomberok	4,817
MŠK Žilina	Žilina	Štadión pod Dubňom	11,181
FC Senec	Senec	NTC Senec	3,264
Slovan Bratislava	Bratislava	Tehelné pole	30,085
Spartak Trnava	Trnava	Štadión Antona Malatinského	18,448
ZTS Dubnica nad Váhom	Dubnica	Štadión Zimný	5,450

== First stage ==
=== League table ===
Pos	Team	Pld	W	D	L	GF	GA	GD	Pts	Qualification or relegation
1	Žilina	22	16	4	2	53	13	+40	52	Qualification for championship group
2	Artmedia Bratislava	22	13	3	6	40	28	+12	42	Qualification for championship group
3	Košice	22	10	4	8	29	29	0	34	Qualification for championship group
4	Ružomberok	22	8	7	7	26	18	+8	31	Qualification for championship group
5	Dukla Banská Bystrica	22	8	7	7	23	25	−2	31	Qualification for championship group
6	Senec	22	9	4	9	22	30	−8	31	Qualification for championship group
7	Nitra	22	9	3	10	16	21	−5	30	Qualification for championship group
8	Slovan Bratislava	22	7	5	10	24	32	−8	26	Qualification for championship group
9	Inter Bratislava	22	6	7	9	25	25	0	25	Qualification for relegation group
10	ZTS Dubnica	22	6	7	9	24	35	−11	25	Qualification for relegation group
11	Spartak Trnava	22	6	6	10	22	33	−11	24	Qualification for relegation group
12	Trenčín	22	3	5	14	17	32	−15	14	Qualification for relegation group

Source: RSSSF.org
Rules for classification: 1) points; 2) goal difference; 3) number of goals scored.

=== Results ===
Home \ Away	ART	BB	DUB	INT	KOŠ	NIT	RUŽ	SEN	SLO	TRE	TRN	ŽIL
Artmedia Bratislava		3–0	2–1	1–1	3–0	1–0	2–2	3–1	4–1	4–1	1–2	3–2
Dukla Banská Bystrica	2–0		5–1	0–0	2–1	1–0	0–0	1–1	0–0	1–0	2–2	2–1
ZTS Dubnica	0–1	0–1		5–2	1–3	1–0	2–1	1–1	1–1	0–0	1–0	1–5
Inter Bratislava	1–0	2–0	1–1		1–2	3–0	2–1	1–2	1–1	2–2	2–0	1–2
Košice	2–0	3–1	0–0	1–0		0–1	0–1	2–0	3–2	2–1	0–0	0–2
Nitra	0–3	1–0	1–0	0–0	0–2		1–0	2–0	1–0	2–0	3–2	0–1
Ružomberok	1–3	1–0	5–0	0–0	1–1	3–2		2–0	1–0	0–1	4–0	1–1
Senec	1–2	2–2	1–0	2–1	4–1	0–1	0–0		2–0	1–0	2–0	0–3
Slovan Bratislava	2–2	1–1	1–3	1–3	3–1	1–0	1–0	2–0		2–1	2–0	0–2
Trenčín	4–0	1–2	0–1	2–1	0–2	0–0	0–2	0–1	1–2		0–0	1–1
Spartak Trnava	1–2	2–1	2–2	1–0	3–3	2–0	0–0	0–1	2–1	3–2		0–3
Žilina	3–0	4–0	2–2	1–0	3–0	1–1	2–0	6–0	3–0	4–1	1–0	

Source: RSSSF.org
Legend: Blue = home team win; Yellow = draw; Red = away team win.

== Championship group ==
=== League table ===
Pos	Team	Pld	W	D	L	GF	GA	GD	Pts	Qualification
1	Žilina (C)	28	22	3	3	80	17	+63	69	Qualification for Champions League first qualifying round
2	Artmedia Bratislava	28	17	5	6	56	38	+18	56	Qualification for UEFA Cup first qualifying round
3	Slovan Bratislava	28	11	8	9	35	33	+2	41	Qualification for Intertoto Cup first round
4	Ružomberok	28	10	7	11	25	29	−4	37	
5	Košice	28	10	5	13	31	35	−4	35	
6	Nitra	28	9	4	15	21	33	−12	31	
7	Dukla Banská Bystrica	28	7	6	15	24	46	−22	27	
8	Senec	28	3	8	17	22	63	−41	17	

Source: RSSSF.org
Rules for classification: 1) points; 2) goal difference; 3) number of goals scored.
(C) Champions

=== Results ===
Home \ Away	ART	BB	KOŠ	NIT	RUŽ	SEN	SLO	ŽIL
Artmedia Bratislava		3–1	3–2	1–0	1–0	5–2	2–0	1–1
Dukla Banská Bystrica	3–1		0–1	1–0	1–2	1–0	2–2	1–2
Košice	0–3	5–0		3–0	1–0	0–0	0–0	0–2
Nitra	1–1	2–1	0–0		1–0	1–1	0–2	0–2
Ružomberok	1–3	2–0	1–0	1–0		0–0	1–1	1–4
Senec	2–2	2–1	1–3	1–5	0–4		1–1	0–5
Slovan Bratislava	3–1	1–0	0–0	2–0	1–0	4–1		3–2
Žilina	6–1	5–0	2–0	4–1	4–0	4–0	3–2	

Source: RSSSF.org
Legend: Blue = home team win; Yellow = draw; Red = away team win.

== Promotion/relegation group ==
=== League table ===
Pos	Team	Pld	W	D	L	GF	GA	GD	Pts	Qualification or relegation
1	Spartak Trnava (O)	14	7	4	3	18	13	+5	25	Remain in Corgoň Liga
2	ZTS Dubnica (O)	14	6	5	3	16	15	+1	23	Remain in Corgoň Liga
3	ViOn Zlaté Moravce (P)	14	7	1	6	20	15	+5	22	Promoted to Corgoň Liga; Qualification for UEFA Cup first qualifying round (Note: ViOn Zlaté Moravce qualify for 2007–08 UEFA Cup as winner of 2006–07 Slovak Cup.)
4	Trenčín (O)	14	5	6	3	20	17	+3	21	Remain in Corgoň Liga
5	Inter Bratislava (R)	14	5	4	5	14	15	−1	19	Relegated to 1. Liga
6	Eldus Močenok	14	4	6	4	16	18	−2	18	Remain in 1. Liga
7	Rimavská Sobota	14	4	3	7	20	23	−3	15	Remain in 1. Liga
8	Slovan Duslo Šaľa	14	1	5	8	15	23	−8	8	Remain in 1. Liga

Source: RSSSF.org
Rules for classification: 1) points; 2) goal difference; 3) number of goals scored.
(O) Play-off winners; (P) Promoted; (R) Relegated

=== Results ===
Home \ Away	DUB	INT	ELD	RIM	ŠAL	TRE	TRN	ZLM
ZTS Dubnica		0–0	1–1	2–0	1–0	3–1	2–1	2–1
Inter Bratislava	1–0		2–0	2–1	1–3	3–1	1–1	0–1
Eldus Močenok	1–1	2–0		3–2	1–1	0–3	1–2	1–0
Rimavská Sobota	5–1	2–0	1–1		1–0	3–3	1–1	0–3
Slovan Duslo Šaľa	1–1	0–0	3–3	2–3		0–0	1–2	1–3
Trenčín	0–0	1–1	2–1	1–0	3–1		1–1	3–2
Spartak Trnava	0–2	3–1	0–0	2–0	1–0	2–1		1–2
ViOn Zlaté Moravce	3–0	0–2	0–1	2–1	3–2	0–0	0–1	

Source: RSSSF.org
Legend: Blue = home team win; Yellow = draw; Red = away team win.

== Season statistics ==
=== Top scorers ===
Rank	Player	Club	Goals
1	(Slovakia) Tomáš Oravec	Artmedia Bratislava	16
2	(Slovakia) Stanislav Šesták	Žilina	15
3	(Slovenia) Dare Vršič	Žilina	14
3	(Slovakia) Adam Nemec	Žilina	14
3	(Slovakia) Pavol Masaryk	Slovan Bratislava	14
6	(Slovakia) Peter Štyvar	Trenčín(3)/Žilina(10)	13
7	(Slovakia) Róbert Rák	Nitra(1)/Ružomberok(11)	12
7	(Slovakia) Andrej Porázik	Žilina	12
9	(Slovakia) Michal Filo	ZTS Dubnica	10
9	(Slovakia) Juraj Halenár	Artmedia Bratislava	10
11	(Slovakia) Ivan Lietava	Banska Bystrica	9
11	(Slovakia) Róbert Jež	Žilina	9

== Awards ==
=== Top Eleven ===
- Goalkeeper: (Slovakia) Štefan Senecký (FC Nitra)
- Defence: (Slovakia) Peter Pekarík, (Slovakia) Tomáš Hubočan, (Czech Republic) Benjamin Vomáčka (all MŠK Žilina), (Slovakia) Marián Čišovský (Artmedia)
- Midfield: (Slovakia) Igor Žofčák (Ružomberok), (Slovakia) Zdeno Štrba (MŠK Žilina), (Slovakia) Samuel Slovák (Slovan Bratislava), (Slovakia) Róbert Jež (MŠK Žilina)
- Attack: (Slovakia) Tomáš Oravec (Artmedia), (Slovakia) Stanislav Šesták (MŠK Žilina)

=== Individual awards ===
Manager of the season

(Czech Republic) Pavel Vrba (MŠK Žilina)

Referee of the Year

Ľuboš Micheľ

== See also ==
- 2006–07 Slovak Cup
- 2006–07 Slovak First League
