= Kozuch =

Kozuch or Kožuch is a surname meaning "fur coat" in Slovak and Polish. Notable people with the surname include:

- Margareta Kozuch (born 1986), German volleyball player
- Vladimír Kožuch (born 1975), Slovak football striker
