= David Kotrys =

Czech footballer (born 1977)

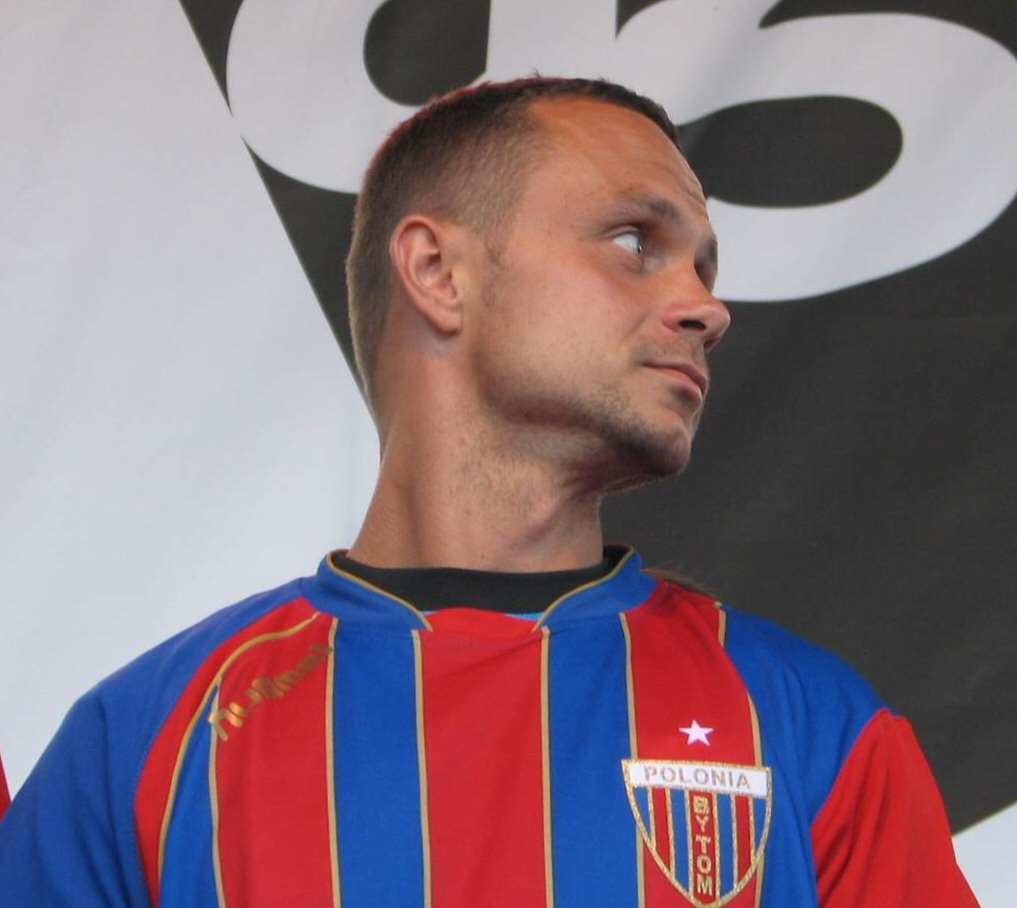

Personal information
- Date of birth: 3 June 1977 (age 49)
- Place of birth: Český Těšín, Czechoslovakia
- Height: 1.84 m (6 ft 1/2 in)
- Position: Defender

Youth career
- TJ AZ Havířov

Senior career*
Years	Team	Apps	(Gls)
1994–1997	Baník Havířov	35	(2)
1997–1999	FC Karviná	32	(1)
1999	FC Vítkovice	11	(0)
1999	Sigma Olomouc	8	(0)
1999	1. SK Prostějov	15	(0)
2000	Sigma Olomouc	36	(0)
2000–2001	Bohemians Prague	6	(0)
2002–2004	FC Vysočina Jihlava	45	(2)
2004	Baník Ostrava	4	(0)
2005–2006	MFK Ružomberok		
2006–2009	Dukla Banská Bystrica	50	(2)
2009–2010	Polonia Bytom	21	(1)
- * Club domestic league appearances and goals

David Kotrys (born 3 June 1977) is a Czech former professional footballer who played as a defender.

== Career ==
Kotrys played for several Czech and Slovak clubs before moving to Poland in 2009.

== Honours ==
MFK Ružomberok

- Slovak Superliga: 2005–06
- Slovak Cup: 2005–06
