= Marek Sapara =

Slovak footballer (born 1982)

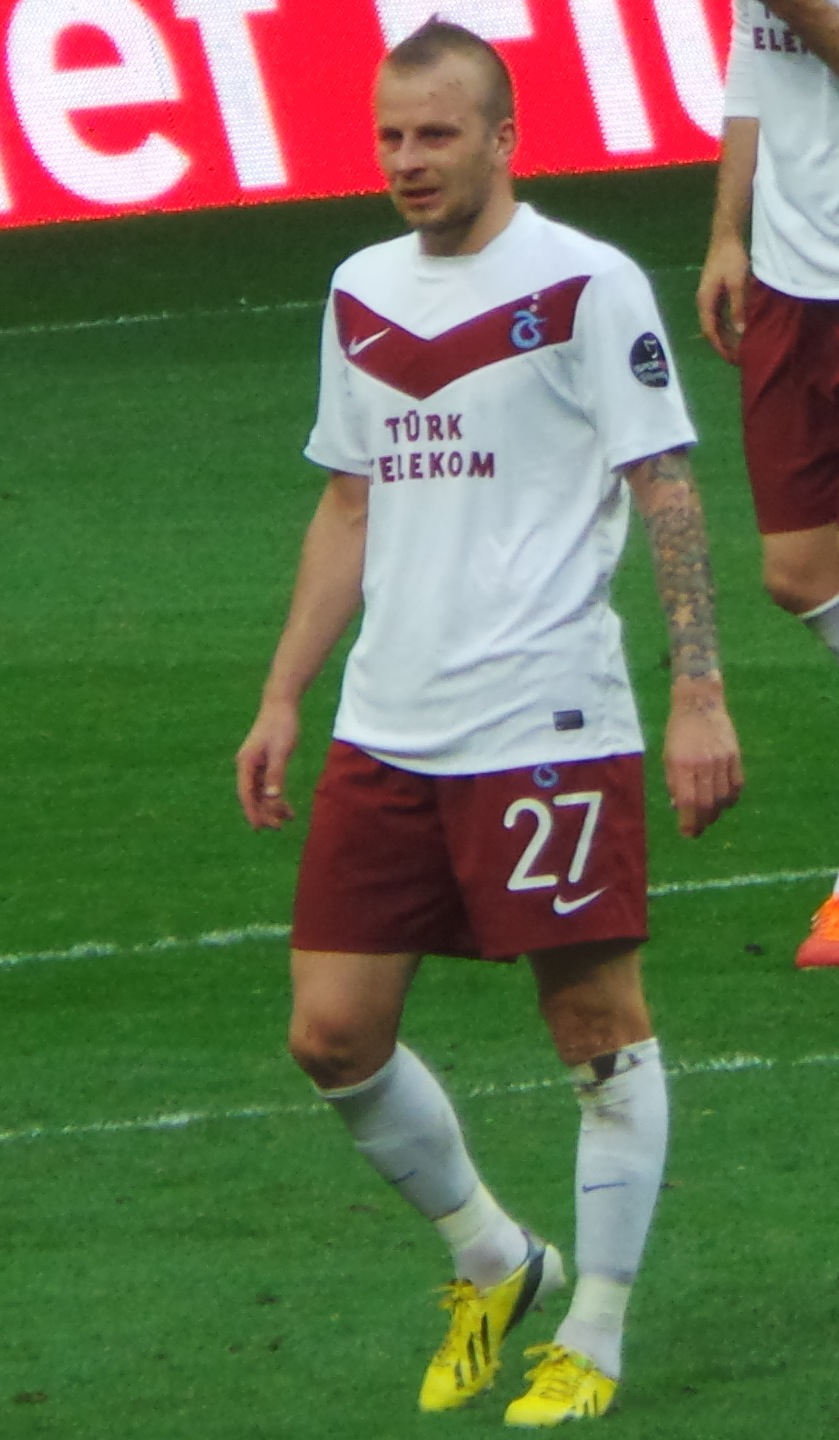
- Sapara with Trabzonspor in 2013

Personal information
- Date of birth: 31 July 1982 (age 44)
- Place of birth: Ďurďošík, Czechoslovakia
- Height: 1.76 m (5 ft 9 in)
- Position: Midfielder

Youth career
- Košice

Senior career*
Years	Team	Apps	(Gls)
2000–2002	Košice	26	(3)
2002–2006	Ružomberok	79	(9)
2006–2010	Rosenborg	77	(19)
2010–2011	Ankaragücü	37	(4)
2011–2013	Trabzonspor	28	(2)
2012	→ Gaziantepspor (loan)	16	(3)
2014	Gaziantepspor	10	(2)
2014–2015	Osmanlıspor	7	(0)
2015	→ Ružomberok (loan)	6	(0)
2015–2017	Ružomberok	35	(2)
2018	Ružomberok B	0	(0)
2020-2022	OŠK Bešeňová	0	(0)
Total		321	(44)

International career^{‡}
2005–2013	Slovakia	38	(5)

Managerial career
- 2018–2019: Ružomberok B
- 2019–2021: Ružomberok (assistant coach)
- 2025-: FC Košice (Sport dir.)
- * Club domestic league appearances and goals as of 1 July 2021 ‡ National team caps and goals as of 12 August 2019

Marek Sapara (born 31 July 1982) is a Slovak former professional footballer who played as a midfielder. He was an assistant manager at MFK Ružomberok. Sapara appeared at the FIFA 2010 World Cup in South Africa.

== Club career ==
=== Rosenborg ===
Sapara joined Rosenborg in 2006, making his debut for the Norwegian side on 10 September 2006 in a match against Sandefjord. On 26 September, he scored his first goal for the club against Odd Grenland.

=== Trabzonspor ===
September 2011, Sapara joined Trabzonspor along with Róbert Vittek, for a transfer fee of €200,000. On 5 January 2012, he went on loan to Gaziantepspor until the end of the 2011–12 season.

=== Return to Ružomberok ===
In 2015 Sapara returned to MFK Ružomberok, where he ended his career in 2018. He then became an assistant coach of Ján Haspra at Ružomberok's reserve team. In June 2019, Haspra and Sapara moved on to manage the first team.

== International career ==
Sapara was a part of the Slovakia U21 national team. He made his debut for the senior side in 2005.

== Career statistics ==
=== International ===
Appearances and goals by national team and year
National team	Year	Apps	Goals
Slovakia	2005	1	0
Slovakia	2006	3	1
Slovakia	2007	8	1
Slovakia	2008	6	0
Slovakia	2009	5	0
Slovakia	2010	6	0
Slovakia	2011	–	
Slovakia	2012	6	3
Slovakia	2013	3	0
Total		38	5

Scores and results list Slovakia's goal tally first, score column indicates score after each Sapara goal.

List of international goals scored by Marek Sapara
No.	Date	Venue	Opponent	Score	Result	Competition
1	15 November 2006	Stadium Pod Dubňom, Žilina, Slovakia	Bulgaria	2–0	3–1	Friendly
2	13 October 2007	Mestský štadión, Dubnica, Slovakia	San Marino	3–0	7–0	UEFA Euro 2008 qualification
3	7 September 2012	LFF Stadium, Vilnius, Lithuania	Lithuania	1–1	1–1	2014 FIFA World Cup qualification
4	11 September 2012	Pasienky, Bratislava, Slovakia	Liechtenstein	1–0	2–0	2014 FIFA World Cup qualification
5	12 October 2012	Pasienky, Bratislava, Slovakia	Latvia	2–0	2–1	2014 FIFA World Cup qualification

== Honours ==
MFK Ružomberok

- Slovak Super Liga: 2005–06
- Slovak Cup: 2005–06

Rosenborg

- Tippeligaen: 2006, 2009

Trabzonspor

- Turkish Cup runner-up: 2012–13

Gaziantepspor

- Spor Toto Cup: 2012

Individual

- Tippeligaen player of the month: October 2006
