= 2006–07 Slovak First League =

1. liga
- Season: 2006–07
- Champions: FC ViOn Zlaté Moravce
- Promoted: FC ViOn Zlaté Moravce
- Relegated: ŠK Aqua Turčianske Teplice
- UEFA Cup: FC ViOn Zlaté Moravce (via domestic cup)
- Matches: 188
- Goals: 451 (2.4 per match)

The 2006–07 season of the Slovak Second League (also known as 1. liga) was the fourteenth season of the league since its establishment. It began on 15 July 2006 and ended on 30 May 2007.

== First stage ==
=== League table ===
Pos	Team	Pld	W	D	L	GF	GA	GD	Pts	Qualification
1	Rimavská Sobota	22	13	5	4	45	20	+25	44	Qualification for promotion playoff
2	Slovan Duslo Šaľa	22	12	7	3	36	20	+16	43	Qualification for promotion playoff
3	ViOn Zlaté Moravce	22	12	4	6	28	19	+9	40	Qualification for promotion playoff
4	Eldus Močenok	22	11	6	5	39	30	+9	39	Qualification for promotion playoff
5	Tatran Prešov	22	8	9	5	28	19	+9	33	Qualification for relegation playoff
6	LAFC Lučenec	22	8	5	9	25	23	+2	29	Qualification for relegation playoff
7	MFK Košice B	22	8	5	9	23	30	−7	29	Qualification for relegation playoff
8	Podbrezová	22	5	8	9	21	29	−8	23	Qualification for relegation playoff
9	Zemplín Michalovce	22	4	10	8	25	31	−6	22	Qualification for relegation playoff
10	DAC 1904 Dunajská Streda	22	5	7	10	21	32	−11	22	Qualification for relegation playoff
11	1. HFC Humenné	22	5	7	10	23	38	−15	22	Qualification for relegation playoff
12	Aqua Turčianske Teplice	22	4	1	17	27	50	−23	13	Qualification for relegation playoff

Source: RSSSF.org
Rules for classification: 1) points; 2) goal difference; 3) number of goals scored.

== Promotion playoff ==
=== League table ===
Pos	Team	Pld	W	D	L	GF	GA	GD	Pts	Promotion or relegation
1	Spartak Trnava (O)	14	7	4	3	18	13	+5	25	Remain in Corgoň Liga
2	ZTS Dubnica (O)	14	6	5	3	16	15	+1	23	Remain in Corgoň Liga
3	ViOn Zlaté Moravce (P)	14	7	1	6	20	15	+5	22	Promoted to Corgoň Liga; Qualification for UEFA Cup first qualifying round (Note: ViOn Zlaté Moravce qualify for 2007–08 UEFA Cup as winner of 2006–07 Slovak Cup.)
4	AS Trenčín (O)	14	5	6	3	20	17	+3	21	Remain in Corgoň Liga
5	Inter Bratislava (R)	14	5	4	5	14	15	−1	19	Relegated to 1. Liga
6	Eldus Močenok	14	4	6	4	16	18	−2	18	Remain in 1. Liga
7	Rimavská Sobota	14	4	3	7	20	23	−3	15	Remain in 1. Liga
8	Slovan Duslo Šaľa	14	1	5	8	15	23	−8	8	Remain in 1. Liga

Source: RSSSF.org
Rules for classification: 1) points; 2) goal difference; 3) number of goals scored.
(O) Play-off winners; (P) Promoted; (R) Relegated

== Relegation playoff ==
=== League table ===
Pos	Team	Pld	W	D	L	GF	GA	GD	Pts	Qualification or relegation
1	Tatran Prešov	14	8	5	1	27	7	+20	29	Remain in 1. Liga
2	Zemplín Michalovce	14	7	4	3	15	11	+4	25	Remain in 1. Liga
3	Podbrezová	14	6	4	4	15	10	+5	22	Remain in 1. Liga
4	1. HFC Humenné	14	5	3	6	14	16	−2	18	Remain in 1. Liga
5	DAC 1904 Dunajská Streda	14	4	5	5	11	14	−3	17	Remain in 1. Liga
6	MFK Košice B	14	3	7	4	10	9	+1	16	Remain in 1. Liga
7	LAFC Lučenec	14	4	1	9	12	25	−13	13	Remain in 1. Liga
8	Aqua Turčianske Teplice (R)	14	2	5	7	9	21	−12	11	Relegated to 2. Liga

Source: RSSSF.org
Rules for classification: 1) points; 2) goal difference; 3) number of goals scored.
(R) Relegated

== See also ==
- 2006–07 Slovak Superliga
