= Miroslav Božok =

Slovak footballer

Personal information
- Full name: Miroslav Božok
- Date of birth: 19 October 1984 (age 42)
- Place of birth: Michalovce, Czechoslovakia
- Height: 1.76 m (5 ft 9 1/2 in)
- Position: Left winger

Team information
- Current team: OŠK Lisková

Youth career
- 1992–2001: Zemplín Michalovce

Senior career*
Years	Team	Apps	(Gls)
2002	Zemplín Michalovce	12	(2)
2002	Senec	6	(1)
2003–2009	Ružomberok	175	(8)
2010–2011	Arka Gdynia	39	(0)
2011–2012	GKS Bełchatów	37	(3)
2013–2014	Zemplín Michalovce	17	(2)
2014–2015	Górnik Łęczna	44	(4)
2015–2017	Arka Gdynia	52	(3)
2017	Zemplín Michalovce	15	(0)
2018–2020	Družstevník Liptovská Štiavnica		
2019–2020	→ OŠK Bešeňová (loan)		
2020–2022	OŠK Bešeňová		
2022–	OŠK Lisková		

International career
2006	Slovakia U21	4	(0)
- * Club domestic league appearances and goals as of 18 October 2024

Miroslav Božok (born 19 October 1984) is a Slovak footballer who plays as a midfielder for OŠK Lisková.

== Club career ==
Božok began his career at MFK Zemplín Michalovce. In 2002, he moved to Senec to play for FC Senec team. A half a year later, he joined MFK Ružomberok to play in the Slovak Superliga. He won the Superliga championship and the Slovak Cup in 2005–06 season with MFK Ružomberok.

In July 2011, he joined GKS Bełchatów on a two-year contract.

In February 2013, he returned to MFK Zemplín Michalovce.

== International career ==
He played for the Slovakia national under-18 football team in 2002.

In 2002 and 2003, Božok played for the Slovakia national under-19 football team in UEFA European Under-19 Championship qualifying rounds.

In 2006, he made four appearances for the Slovakia national under-21 football team.

== Statistics ==
Season	Club	League	Apps	Goals
2001–02	MFK Zemplín Michalovce	2.Liga	12	2
2002–03	FC Senec	1.Liga	6	1
2002–03	MFK Ružomberok	Superliga	3	0
2003–04	MFK Ružomberok	Superliga	18	0
2004–05	MFK Ružomberok	Superliga	14	0
2005–06	MFK Ružomberok	Superliga	35	1
2006–07	MFK Ružomberok	Superliga	32	2
2007–08	MFK Ružomberok	Superliga	27	1
2008–09	MFK Ružomberok	Superliga	30	4
2009–10	MFK Ružomberok	Superliga	16	0
2009–10	Arka Gdynia	Ekstraklasa	13	0
2010–11	Arka Gdynia	Ekstraklasa	26	0

== Honours ==
MFK Ružomberok

- Superliga: 2005–06
- Slovak Cup: 2005–06

Arka Gdynia

- Polish Cup: 2016–17
