= Rudolf Urban (footballer) =

Slovak footballer

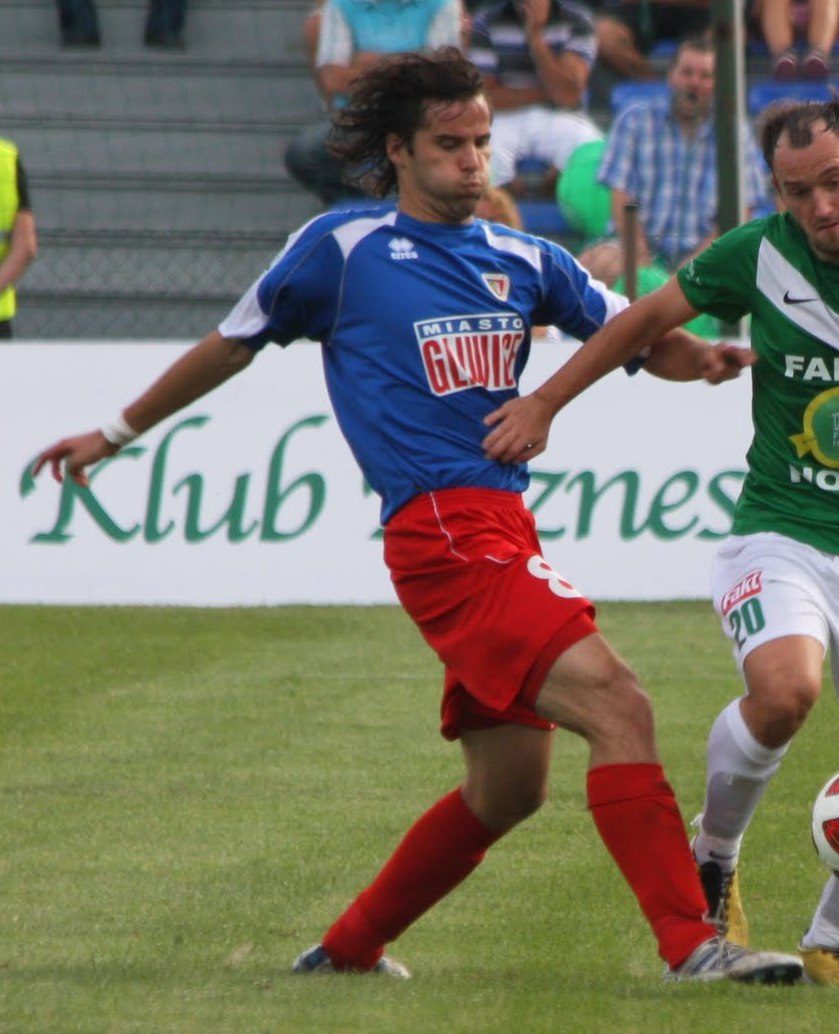

Personal information
- Full name: Rudolf Urban
- Date of birth: 1 March 1980 (age 46)
- Place of birth: Košice, Czechoslovakia
- Height: 1.81 m (5 ft 11 1/2 in)
- Position: Midfielder

Team information
- Current team: FC Košice (youth)

Youth career
- TJ VSS Košice

Senior career*
Years	Team	Apps	(Gls)
1998–2002	Košice	90	(12)
2002–2006	Ružomberok	127	(11)
2006–2007	Inter Bratislava	19	(2)
2007	Győri ETO	2	(0)
2008	MFK Košice B		
2008–2009	Vysočina Jihlava	25	(1)
2009	Banik Most	1	(0)
2010	Sandecja Nowy Sącz	31	(7)
2011–2013	Piast Gliwice	44	(5)
2013	Podbeskidzie	11	(2)
2013	Podbeskidzie II	1	(1)
2014–2015	Sandecja Nowy Sącz	36	(4)
2015–2016	Lokomotíva Košice	5	(2)

International career
2003–2004	Slovakia	6	(0)

Managerial career
- 2020–2021: FC Košice (assistant)
- 2021–: FC Košice (youth)
- * Club domestic league appearances and goals

Rudolf Urban (born 1 March 1980) is a Slovak former professional footballer who played as a midfielder.

== Honours ==
Ružomberok

- Slovak First Football League: 2005–06
- Slovak Cup: 2005–06

Piast Gliwice

- I liga: 2011–12
