= Ján Ďurica =

Slovak footballer (born 1981)

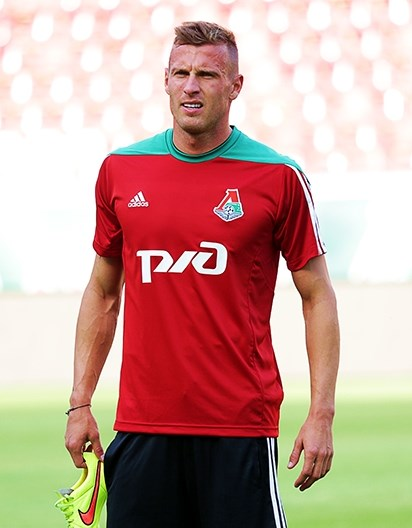
- Ďurica with Lokomotiv Moscow in 2014

Personal information
- Date of birth: 10 December 1981 (age 44)
- Place of birth: Dunajská Streda, Czechoslovakia
- Height: 1.88 m (6 ft 2 in)
- Position: Centre-back

Youth career
- DAC 1904 Dunajská Streda

Senior career*
Years	Team	Apps	(Gls)
2001–2003	DAC 1904 Dunajská Streda	26	(1)
2003–2005	Artmedia Petržalka	78	(2)
2006–2008	Saturn Moscow Oblast	72	(2)
2009–2016	Lokomotiv Moscow	131	(6)
2010	→ Hannover 96 (loan)	9	(0)
2016–2018	Trabzonspor	46	(0)
2018–2019	Dukla Prague	17	(2)
Total		379	(13)

International career
2004–2017	Slovakia	91	(4)

Managerial career
- 2019–2020: FC Petržalka (assistant)
- * Club domestic league appearances and goals

Ján Ďurica (born 10 December 1981) is a Slovak former professional footballer who played as a central defender. He worked as assistant manager of FC Petržalka.

== Club career ==
Ďurica moved to FC Saturn Moscow Oblast after a highly successful UEFA Champions League campaign with FC Artmedia Bratislava. On 31 January 2009, Ďurica signed a three-year contract with Lokomotiv Moscow, who have paid around €3.5 million to overtake Celtic and Panathinaikos in the auction for the Slovakia national team. On 13 January 2010, it was confirmed that he would join Hannover 96 on loan until the end of the season.

In January 2016, Ďurica signs a two-year contract with Süper Lig side Trabzonspor. He was released on 18 May 2018 after his contract expired.

On 5 September 2018, Ďurica signed for Dukla Prague until the end of the 2018–19 season. He announced his retirement from professional football after the club was relegated from Czech First League, having scored 2 goals in 17 appearances for Dukla.

== International career ==
On 9 July 2004, Ďurica made his Slovakia senior team debut against Japan at the 2004 Kirin Cup. He was selected for the Slovak squad for the 2010 FIFA World Cup, their first major tournament as an independent nation, playing all four matches at the 2010 FIFA World Cup.

Upon contributing to Slovakia's first appearance at a UEFA Euro 2016, Ďurica was one of the players who completed all of Slovakia's four matches of the tournament. Once the tournament ended, Ďurica hinted his desire to retire from international football after 2018 FIFA World Cup. However, as Slovakia failed to qualify, Ďurica retired on 14 November 2017, after a home friendly match against Norway (1–0 win), with a final statistic of 91 caps and 4 goals.

== Career statistics ==
=== Club ===
As of 14 November 2017

Appearances and goals by club, season and competition
Club	Season	League			Cup		Europe		Total	
Club	Season	Division	Apps	Goals	Apps	Goals	Apps	Goals	Apps	Goals
DAC Dunajská Streda	2001–02	Slovak 2. Liga	2	0	0	0	–		2	0
DAC Dunajská Streda	2002–03	Slovak 2. Liga	24	1	0	0	–		24	1
DAC Dunajská Streda	Total		26	1	0	0	0	0	26	1
Artmedia Petržalka	2003–04	Slovak Super Liga	30	0	0	0	4	2	34	2
Artmedia Petržalka	2004–05	Slovak Super Liga	28	2	0	0	–		28	2
Artmedia Petržalka	2005–06	Slovak Super Liga	20	0	0	0	12	0	32	0
Artmedia Petržalka	Total		78	2	0	0	16	2	94	4
Saturn Ramenskoye	2006	Russian Premier League	27	0	6	1	–		33	1
Saturn Ramenskoye	2007	Russian Premier League	25	0	4	0	–		29	0
Saturn Ramenskoye	2008	Russian Premier League	20	2	1	0	–		21	2
Saturn Ramenskoye	Total		72	2	11	1	0	0	83	3
Lokomotiv Moscow	2009	Russian Premier League	10	0	0	0	–		10	0
Lokomotiv Moscow	2010	Russian Premier League	10	0	0	0	0	0	10	0
Lokomotiv Moscow	2011–12	Russian Premier League	27	3	1	0	6	0	34	3
Lokomotiv Moscow	2012–13	Russian Premier League	20	1	1	0	–		21	1
Lokomotiv Moscow	2013–14	Russian Premier League	30	1	0	0	–		30	1
Lokomotiv Moscow	2014–15	Russian Premier League	21	0	2	0	2	0	25	0
Lokomotiv Moscow	2015–16	Russian Premier League	13	1	1	0	6	0	20	1
Lokomotiv Moscow	Total		131	6	5	0	14	0	150	6
Hannover 96 (loan)	2009–10	Bundesliga	9	0	0	0	–		9	0
Trabzonspor	2016–17	Süper Lig	28	0	5	0	–		33	0
Trabzonspor	2017–18	Süper Lig	12	0	2	0	–		14	0
Trabzonspor	Total		47	0	6	0	0	0	42	0
Career total			352	11	22	1	30	2	404	14

=== International ===
Scores and results list Slovakia's goal tally first, score column indicates score after each Ďurica goal.

List of international goals scored by Ján Ďurica
No.	Date	Venue	Opponent	Score	Result	Competition
1	13 October 2007	Mestský štadión, Dubnica nad Váhom, Slovakia	San Marino	7–0	7–0	UEFA Euro 2008 qualifying
2	12 October 2010	Stadium Pod Dubňom, Žilina, Slovakia	Republic of Ireland	3–1	1–1	UEFA Euro 2012 qualifying
3	7 June 2013	Rheinpark Stadion, Vaduz, Liechtenstein	Liechtenstein	1–1	1–1	2014 FIFA World Cup qualification
4	5 March 2014	Netanya Stadium, Netanya, Israel	Israel	2–0	3–1	Friendly

== Personal life ==
Born in Dunajská Streda, Ďurica belongs to the Hungarian minority in Slovakia through his mother. He also starred in Markíza show Let's Dance.

On 4 November 2020, Ďurica found his football academy Mladé levy for children age six until eleven years old, expected to start January the following year.

Ďurica was in relationship with Magdalena Šebestová until 2019. In 2022, he proposed to his girlfriend, Miss Universe 2013 finalist Diana Kačurová. On 1 January 2024, it was announced that Ďurica and Kačurová were expecting a child. Also, in 2024, Ďurica became a teetotaller.

== Honours ==
Artmedia Petržalka

- Slovak Cup: 2003–04
- Slovak Superliga: 2004–05

Lokomotiv Moscow

- Russian Cup: 2014–15

Individual

- List of 33 top players of the Russian league: #1 (2007), #2 (2013–14)
