= Ďurďošík =

Municipality of Slovakia

Ďurďošík Györgyi
- Municipality
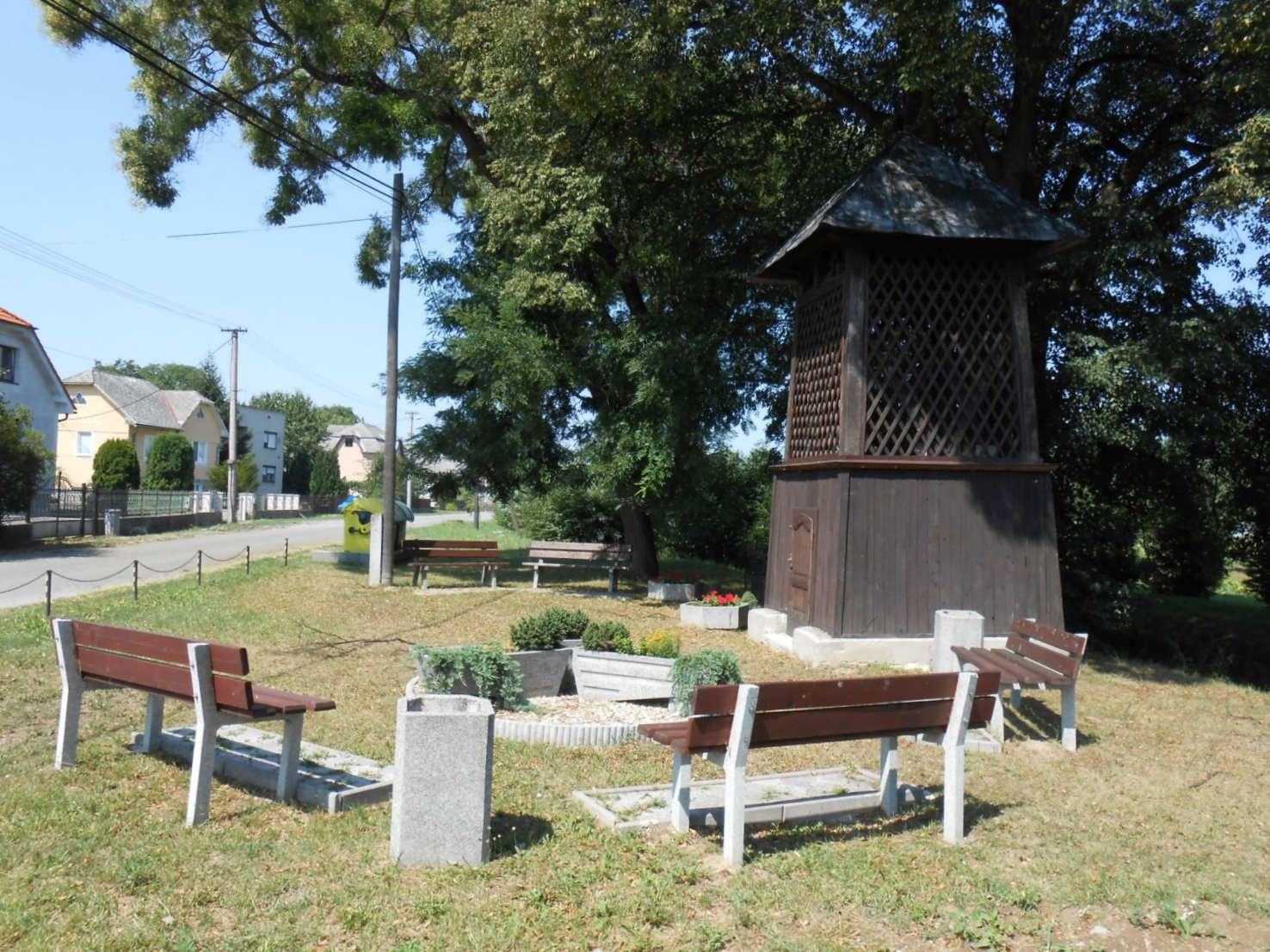

- Flag

- Location of Ďurďošík in the Košice Region Location of Ďurďošík in Slovakia
- Coordinates: 48.74°N 21.42°E
- Country: Slovakia
- Region: Košice Region
- District: Košice-okolie District
- First mentioned: 1330

Area
  - Total: 4.58 km^{2} (1.77 sq mi)
- Elevation: 237 m (778 ft)

Population (2025)
  - Total: 867
- Time zone: UTC+1 (CET)
  - Summer (DST): UTC+2 (CEST)
- Postal code: 444 5
- Area code: +421 55
- Vehicle registration plate (until 2022): KS
- Website: www.obecdurdosik.sk

Ďurďošík (Slovak pronunciation: [ˈɟurɟɔʂiːk]; Hungarian: Györgyi) is a village and municipality in Košice-okolie District in the Košice Region of eastern Slovakia.

== Government ==
The village relies on the police force and fire brigade at Bidovce and the district and tax offices are located at Košice.

== Transport ==
The nearest railway station is located at Košice, 15 kilometres away.

== Geography ==
The municipality lies at an altitude of 237 metres (778 ft) and covers an area of 4.58 km^{2} (1.77 sq mi) (2025).

== Population ==
Population statistic (10 years)
Year	1995	2005	2015	2025
Count	321	355	469	867
Difference		+10.59%	+32.11%	+84.86%

Population statistic
Year	2024	2025
Count	832	867
Difference		+4.20%

It has a population of 867 people (31 December 2025).

=== Ethnicity ===
Census 2021 (1+ %)
Ethnicity	Number	Fraction
Slovak	653	97.9%
Not found out	12	1.79%
Hungarian	8	1.19%
Total	667	

In year 2021 was 667 people by ethnicity 653 as Slovak, 12 as Not found out, 8 as Hungarian, 6 as Rusyn, 2 as Czech, 2 as Russian and 2 as Other.

Note on population: The difference values of population numbers in the table "Population statistic" and in the sections "Ethnicity" & "Religion" is caused by the use of various statistical methods.

=== Religion ===
Census 2021 (1+ %)
Religion	Number	Fraction
Roman Catholic Church	457	68.52%
None	107	16.04%
Evangelical Church	38	5.7%
Greek Catholic Church	35	5.25%
Calvinist Church	14	2.1%
Total	667	

In year 2021 was 667 people by religion 457 from Roman Catholic Church, 107 from None, 38 from Evangelical Church, 35 from Greek Catholic Church, 14 from Calvinist Church, 6 from Eastern Orthodox Church, 6 from Not found out, 1 from Other and not ascertained christian church, 1 from Christian Congregations in Slovakia, 1 from Other and 1 from Ad hoc movements.

== Genealogical resources ==
The records for genealogical research are available at the state archive "Statny Archiv in Kosice, Slovakia"

- Roman Catholic church records (births/marriages/deaths): 1734-1895 (parish B)
- Greek Catholic church records (births/marriages/deaths): 1788-1912 (parish B)
- Lutheran church records (births/marriages/deaths): 1775-1895 (parish B))

== See also ==
- List of municipalities and towns in Slovakia
