= Peter Čvirik =

Slovak footballer

Personal information
- Full name: Peter Čvirik
- Date of birth: 13 June 1979 (age 47)
- Place of birth: Levice, Czechoslovakia
- Height: 1.86 m (6 ft 1 in)
- Position: Defender

Youth career
- 1989–1996: Slovan Levice

Senior career*
Years	Team	Apps	(Gls)
1996–1997	Košice	5	(0)
1997–1999	Slovan Levice		
1999–2000	Banská Bystrica	18	(1)
2000–2002	Žilina	43	(2)
2002–2004	Púchov	38	(3)
2005	OFK Veľký Lapáš		
2005–2006	Spartak Trnava	32	(5)
2006–2008	Petržalka	28	(3)
2008–2010	Lechia Gdańsk	21	(1)
2010	Universitatea Cluj	11	(2)
2011	Sereď		
2011–2012	Spartak Trnava	35	(2)
2013	Jihlava	10	(0)
2013–2014	Gabčíkovo	21	(0)
2015	FC Jelka		
- * Club domestic league appearances and goals

Peter Čvirik (born 13 June 1979) is a Slovak former professional footballer who played as a defender.

== Honours ==
Košice

- Slovak Super Liga: 1996–97

Žilina

- Slovak Super Liga: 2001–02

Púchov

- Slovak Cup: 2002–03

Petržalka

- Slovak Super Liga: 2006–07
- Slovak Cup: 2006–07
