= Kamil Kopúnek =

Slovak footballer (born 1984)

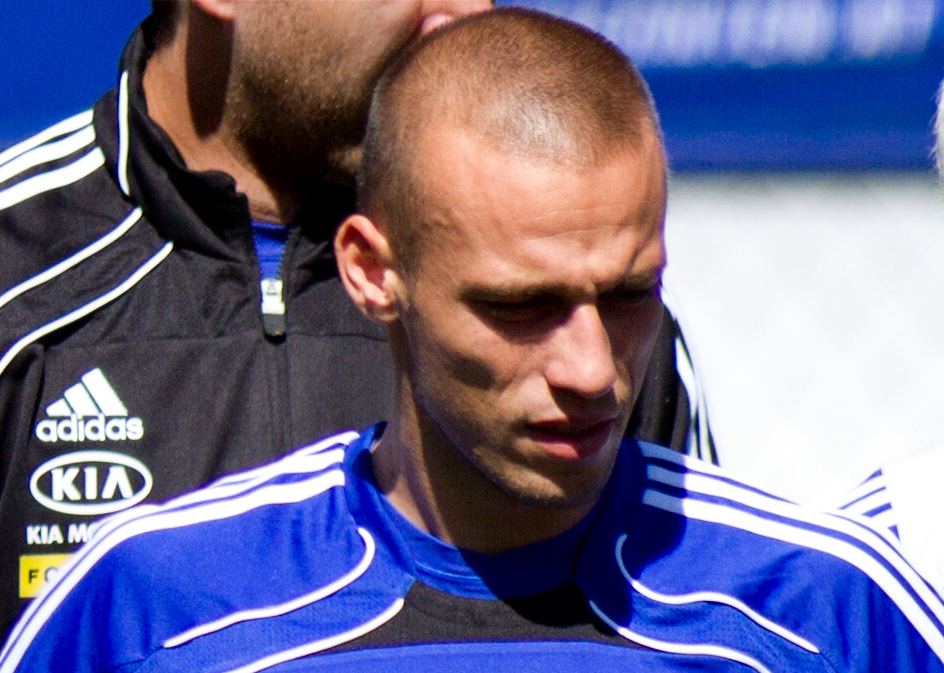
- Kopunek in 2010

Personal information
- Date of birth: 18 May 1984 (age 42)
- Place of birth: Trnava, Czechoslovakia
- Height: 1.79 m (5 ft 10 in)
- Position: Defensive midfielder

Youth career
- Spartak Trnava

Senior career*
Years	Team	Apps	(Gls)
2002–2010	Spartak Trnava	196	(11)
2010	Saturn Moscow Oblast	7	(0)
2011	Bari	18	(0)
2012–2013	Slovan Bratislava	35	(0)
2014	Ravan Baku	11	(0)
2014	Haladás	7	(0)
2015	Zbrojovka Brno	6	(0)
2015–2017	Tatabánya	27	(3)
2017	Törökbálinti TC	7	(2)
2017–2018	Poprad	22	(0)
2018–2019	Bisceglie	0	(0)
Total		336	(16)

International career
2006–2012	Slovakia	17	(2)
- * Club domestic league appearances and goals

Kamil Kopúnek (born 18 May 1984) is a Slovak former footballer who played as a defensive midfielder.

== Club career ==
=== Spartak Trnava ===
Kopúnek started his career with his local club, Spartak Trnava. He became a first-team player in January 2002 at the age of 17 and debuted in spring 2002, receiving a red card in his first match. In October 2009, Kopúnek became a captain.

=== Bari ===
Kopúnek signed a half-year contract with the Serie A club A.S. Bari on 31 January 2011. He made his debut on 13 March in a 1–1 draw against Milan at San Siro. In July 2011, he signed a three-year contract. His contract was ended by mutual consent in January 2012.

=== Ravan Baku ===
After going on trial with FC Bunyodkor in February 2014, Kopúnek went on to sign for Ravan Baku of the Azerbaijan Premier League in March 2014. At the end of the 2013–14 season, Ravan were relegated to the Azerbaijan First Division, and whilst Kopúnek was still contracted to Ravan for the next season, he openly admitted to be looking for a new club.

=== Zbrojovka Brno ===
Kopúnek signed a half-year contract with the Synot liga club FC Zbrojovka Brno on 20 March 2015.

== International career ==
On 1 March 2006, Kopúnek debuted for Slovak senior squad in a 2–1 victory against France at Stade de France in friendly match. He scored his first international goal against Cameroon on 29 May 2010 and was subsequently named to the Slovakia squad for the 2010 FIFA World Cup. On 24 June 2010, coming on as a substitute, he scored Slovakia's third goal with his first touch of the game in their group match against Italy which ended 3–2 and eventually sent the Italians crashing out of the FIFA World Cup 2010.

== Career statistics ==
=== Club ===
As of 19 May 2014

Club	Season	League		Domestic Cup		Europe		Total	
Club	Season	App	Goals	App	Goals	App	Goals	App	Goals
Spartak Trnava	2001–02	1	0	0	0	0	0	1	0
Spartak Trnava	2002–03	10	2	0	0	0	0	10	2
Spartak Trnava	2003–04	9	0	2	0	1	0	12	0
Spartak Trnava	2004–05	27	1	2	0	5	1	34	2
Spartak Trnava	2005–06	32	4	6	1	0	0	38	5
Spartak Trnava	2006–07	34	1	2	0	2	0	38	1
Spartak Trnava	2007–08	27	1	5	0	0	0	32	1
Spartak Trnava	2008–09	25	1	1	0	2	0	28	1
Spartak Trnava	2009–10	31	1	6	2	4	0	41	3
Spartak Trnava	Total	196	11	24	3	14	1	234	15
Saturn Moscow Oblast	2010	7	0	1	0	0	0	8	0
Saturn Moscow Oblast	Total	7	0	1	0	0	0	8	0
Bari	2010–11	5	0	0	0	0	0	5	0
Bari	2011–12	13	0	1	0	0	0	14	0
Bari	Total	18	0	1	0	0	0	19	0
Slovan Bratislava	2011–12	14	0	2	0	0	0	16	0
Slovan Bratislava	2012–13	21	0	5	0	1	0	27	0
Slovan Bratislava	Total	35	0	7	0	1	0	43	0
Ravan Baku	2013–14	11	0	1	0	0	0	12	0
Ravan Baku	Total	11	0	1	0	0	0	12	0

=== International goals ===
#	Date	Venue	Opponent	Score	Result	Competition
1.	29 May 2010	Hypo-Arena, Austria	Cameroon	1 – 0	1–1	Friendly match
2.	24 June 2010	Ellis Park Stadium, South Africa	Italy	3 – 1	3–2	2010 FIFA World Cup
