= Igor Žofčák =

Slovak footballer

Personal information
- Full name: Igor Žofčák
- Date of birth: 10 April 1983 (age 43)
- Place of birth: Michalovce, Czechoslovakia
- Height: 1.75 m (5 ft 9 in)
- Position: Midfielder

Team information
- Current team: Spartak Medzilaborce

Youth career
- 1993–2001: Zemplín Michalovce

Senior career*
Years	Team	Apps	(Gls)
2001–2007	Ružomberok	167	(15)
2007–2010	Sparta Praha	47	(5)
2008	→ Jablonec (loan)	26	(1)
2010–2014	Slovan Bratislava	94	(12)
2015–2016	Nyíregyháza Spartacus	42	(2)
2016–2025	Zemplín Michalovce	230	(34)
2025–	Medzilaborce	0	(0)

International career^{‡}
2004–2011	Slovakia	14	(0)
- * Club domestic league appearances and goals as of 26 August 2025 ‡ National team caps and goals as of 11 August 2011

Igor Žofčák (born 10 April 1983) is a retired Slovak professional footballer who plays for MŠK Spartak Medzilaborce. His last professional club was Zemplín Michalovce.

He should actually have stopped in the summer of 2023, but he chose to extend the contract by one year.

== Honours ==
Ružomberok

- Slovak Super Liga: 2005–06
- Slovak Cup: 2005–06

Sparta Praha

- Gambrinus liga: 2009–10

Slovan Bratislava

- Slovak Super Liga: 2010–11, 2012–13, 2013–14
- Slovak Cup: 2010–11, 2012–13
- Slovak Super Cup: 2014

Nyíregyháza Spartacus

- Nemzeti Bajnokság III, Eastern Conference: 2016

Slovakia under-19

- UEFA European Under-19 Football Championship third place: 2002
