= Martin Petráš =

Slovak footballer

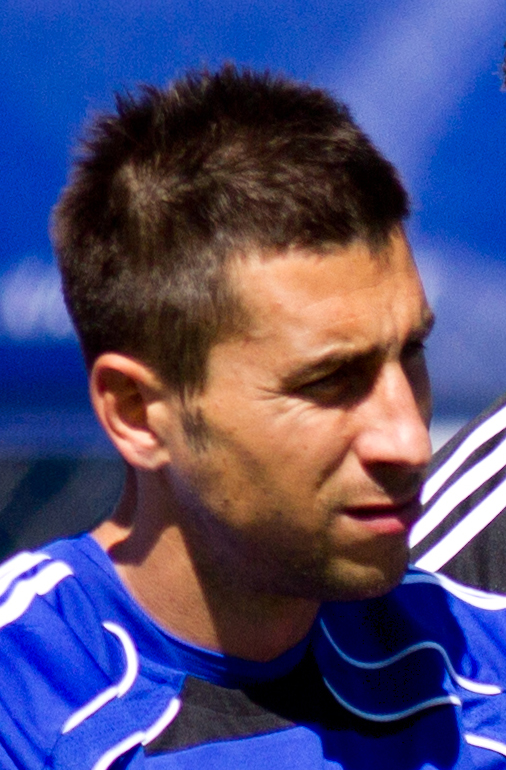
- Petráš in 2010

Personal information
- Date of birth: 2 November 1979 (age 46)
- Place of birth: Bojnice, Czechoslovakia
- Height: 1.86 m (6 ft 1 in)
- Position: Defender

Senior career*
Years	Team	Apps	(Gls)
1998–2000	Baník Prievidza	42	(0)
2000–2002	FK Jablonec	56	(3)
2002–2005	Sparta Prague	74	(6)
2006	Heart of Midlothian	5	(0)
2006	Lecce	17	(1)
2007	Treviso	13	(0)
2007–2009	Triestina	44	(2)
2009–2011	Cesena	29	(0)
2011–2012	Grosseto	46	(0)
2012–2014	A.C. Delta Porto Tolle	30	(0)
2014–2015	S.P. La Fiorita	7	(0)
Total		326	(12)

International career^{‡}
2002–2010	Slovakia	38	(1)
- * Club domestic league appearances and goals as of end of 2011/12 season ‡ National team caps and goals as of 16 December 2010

Martin Petráš (born 2 November 1979 in Bojnice) is a Slovak former football central defender. He made 38 appearances for the Slovakia national football team.

== Biography ==
A youth product of HFK Prievidza, Petráš moved to Scottish club Heart of Midlothian in 2006 alongside six other footballers.

On 6 February 2002, Petráš debuted for the Slovakia national football team in a friendly match against Iran.

Petráš started working as a football agent after retiring from playing in 2015. He lives in Italy with his wife and three children.

== Career statistics ==
#	Date	Venue	Opponent	Score	Result	Competition
1.	29 March 2003	Gradski Stadium, Skopje, Macedonia	Macedonia	1–0	2–0	UEFA Euro 2004 qualifying
