= Martin Laurinc =

Slovak footballer

Personal information
- Date of birth: 4 January 1978 (age 48)
- Height: 1.82 m (6 ft 0 in)
- Position: Defender

Team information
- Current team: ŠK Tvrdošín
- Number: 14

Senior career*
| Years | Team | Apps | (Gls) |
| ?–1998 | Banská Bystrica | | |
| 1999 | Ružomberok | | |
| 1999–2000 | Banská Bystrica | | |
| 2000–2002 | Žilina | | |
| 2003–2008 | Ružomberok | | |
| 2008–2009 | České Budějovice | 6 | (0) |
| 2008–2009 | Senica | 25 | (0) |
| 2009–2010 | Lučenec | | |
| 2011 | Ružiná | | |
| 2012– | ŠK Tvrdošín | | |
- * Club domestic league appearances and goals as of 17 November 2011

Martin Laurinc (born 4 January 1978) is a Slovak football player who currently plays for ŠK Tvrdošín.
