= Jan Nezmar =

Czech footballer

Personal information
- Date of birth: 5 July 1977 (age 49)
- Place of birth: Opava, Czechoslovakia
- Height: 1.85 m (6 ft 1 in)
- Positions: Striker; centre back

Team information
- Current team: Slovan Liberec (general director)

Youth career
- 1983–1994: TJ Družba Hlavnice
- 1994–1996: MSA Dolní Benešov

Senior career*
Years	Team	Apps	(Gls)
1996–1999	MSA Dolní Benešov		
1999–2000	SFC Opava	24	(8)
2000–2003	Slovan Liberec	90	(28)
2003–2005	Slovácko	46	(10)
2005–2007	Ružomberok	51	(24)
2007–2012	Slovan Liberec	151	(34)
2013–2016	Oberlausitz Neugersdorf	70	(58)
Total		432	(162)
- * Club domestic league appearances and goals

Jan Nezmar (born 5 July 1977 in Opava) is a former Czech football player who played as a striker or central defender, and is the general director of Slovan Liberec. He spent a large portion of his active career in the Czech club Slovan Liberec, where he was also club captain for several years. He is the top scorer in the history of the club.

Nezmar started his football career in a small village of Hlavnice. After a couple of years there young Nezmar moved to the Czech third division, to play for MSA Dolní Benešov. In 1998, he transferred to the town where he was born, Opava. At SFC Opava Nezmar gained experience and two years later was bought by Slovan Liberec. Together with midfielder Václav Koloušek and striker Jiří Štajner, he helped form the main offensive force of the team. In 2002 Slovan Liberec celebrated its first league title, as Nezmar scored 14 goals and was one of the keys to the unexpected victory.

The following season Jan Nezmar changed his employer again. He would go on to spend two years at Slovácko before moving on to Slovakia to join ambitious Corgoň liga club Ružomberok, signed as an experienced striker with recognised goalscoring ability. In his first season with the club, Ružomberok celebrated winning both the league title and the domestic cup, Nezmar scoring 17 goals. In January 2007 he signed a contract which took him back to his former club Slovan Liberec. On 29 April 2011 he scored his 100th league goal during the home match against Bohemians 1905. On 12 November 2012, he announced his intention to retire as a player and take on a staff role in FC Slovan Liberec. He played his final match on 19 November 2012 against FC Viktoria Plzeň.
