= Peter Ďuriš =

Slovak footballer (born 1981)

Personal information
- Full name: Peter Ďuriš
- Date of birth: 10 April 1981 (age 45)
- Place of birth: Nemšová, Czechoslovakia
- Height: 1.72 m (5 ft 8 in)
- Position: Midfielder

Youth career
- Slovan Bratislava

Senior career*
Years	Team	Apps	(Gls)
2000–2003	AS Trenčín	82	(6)
2003–2010	Spartak Trnava	210	(11)
2010–2011	Slovan Nemšová		
2012–2013	Spartak Myjava	38	(2)

International career
- Slovakia U21

Managerial career
- 2019: Poprad (interim)
- * Club domestic league appearances and goals as of 26 May 2013

Peter Ďuriš (born 10 April 1981) is a retired Slovak football midfielder. He formerly played for Ozeta Dukla Trenčín and Spartak Trnava, and has represented Slovakia at under-21 level.

Ďuriš appears in RTVS, Slovak public broadcaster, during televised national team or club international fixtures as well as major tournaments, like UEFA Euro 2020, as an expert analyst and panel member.
