= Erik Jendrišek =

Slovak footballer (born 1986)

Personal information
- Full name: Erik Jendrišek
- Date of birth: 26 October 1986 (age 40)
- Place of birth: Trstená, Czechoslovakia
- Height: 1.76 m (5 ft 9 in)
- Position: Forward

Team information
- Current team: FK 1931 Hranovnica

Youth career
- 2001–2003: Ružomberok

Senior career*
Years	Team	Apps	(Gls)
2003–2007	Ružomberok	56	(30)
2006–2007	→ Hannover 96 (loan)	9	(0)
2007–2010	1. FC Kaiserslautern	90	(34)
2010–2011	Schalke 04	3	(0)
2011–2013	SC Freiburg	36	(2)
2013–2014	Energie Cottbus	29	(1)
2014	Spartak Trnava	13	(5)
2015–2017	Cracovia	83	(18)
2017–2019	Xanthi	53	(19)
2019–2020	Volos	28	(4)
2021	Nitra	13	(2)
2021–2022	AS Trenčín	17	(4)
2022–2024	Liptovský Mikuláš	46	(6)
2024	Stará Ľubovňa		
2024–2026	Družstevník Liptovská Štiavnica		
2026–	FK 1931 Hranovnica		

International career
2008–2014	Slovakia	37	(4)
- * Club domestic league appearances and goals as of 10:35, 26 October 2024 (UTC)

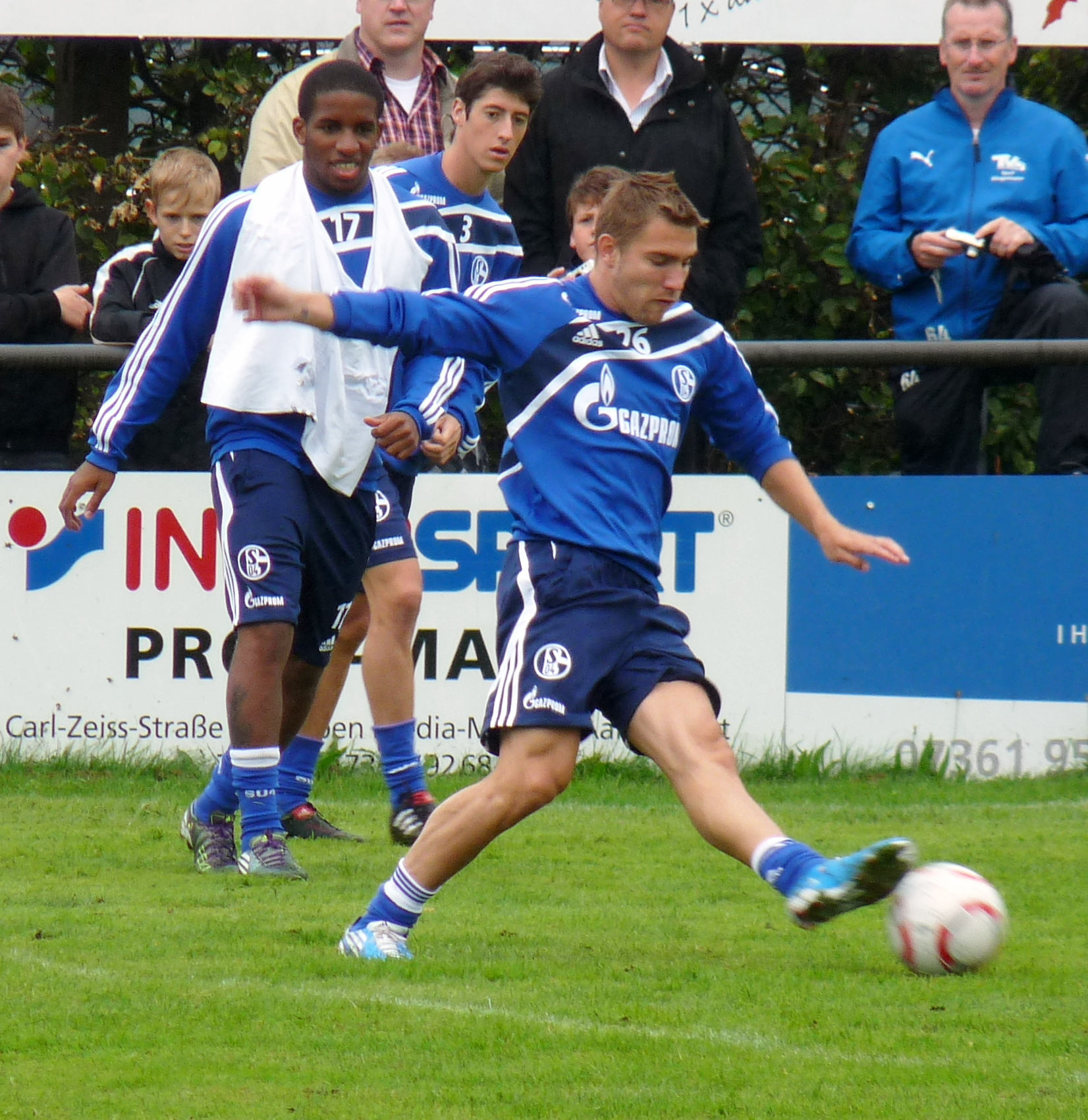
Erik Jendrišek

Erik Jendrišek (born 26 October 1986) is a Slovak footballer who plays as a forward for FK 1931 Hranovnica.

== Club career ==
=== Germany ===
In summer 2006, Jendrišek was signed by Hannover 96 on a season-long loan deal with the option of a permanent deal at the end of the season.

On 30 May 2007, Jendrišek moved to 1. FC Kaiserslautern on a three-year contract. However, he was temporarily suspended by then-coach Milan Šašić over lack of discipline. Rather than accepting a fine and returning to first-team action, Jendrišek chose to play for the club's reserve team, where he played four fourth division games during March and April 2008. He later apologised and accepted the fine.

On 29 April 2010, Jendrišek moved to Schalke 04 on a three-year contract. On 19 January 2011, he left the club for fellow Bundesliga team SC Freiburg for €900,000.

=== Spartak Trnava ===
On 18 August 2014, he signed with Spartak Trnava on a year contract.

=== Xanthi ===
On 26 June 2017, he signed a two-year contract with Greek Super League club Xanthi, on a free transfer again. On 26 August 2017 he scored his first goal with the club in a 2–0 away win against Platanias and on 19 November was scored a brace in the 900th game of his club in Super League sealing a 2–0 home win game against rivals Panionios.

On 13 January 2018, Jendrišek scoring a brace in a 3–2 home win game against Platanias. It was his second time that he scored a brace in Super League after the 2–0 home win game against Panionios. On 15 April 2018, Jendrišek scoring a brace in a 3–0 home win game against PAS Giannina. It was his third time that he scored a brace in Super League after the 3–2 home win game against Platanias. On 23 September 2018, he scored another brace in a 3–0 home victory against OFI, his first for the 2018–19 season, helping his club to acquire his first win for the season. On 21 October 2018, he recorded a goal and an assist in a 2–1 away victory against Levadiakos. One week later, he scored sealing a comeback 2–1 home victory against PAS Giannina.

On 5 November 2018, he scored in a 1–0 away win against Asteras Tripolis, the club's fourth consecutive, after a low cross from Petar Đuričković.

On 21 April 2019, he scored after five months and helped his team take a 2–0 home win against Apollon Smyrnis to secure their spot in the top league.

=== Volos ===
On 14 June 2019, Jendrišek agreed to join newly promoted side Volos on a two-year deal. Four days later, the team officially announced his acquisition. On 31 August 2019, he scored his first goal in a 1–0 home victory against Aris. On 9 November 2019, he scored in a much-needed 3–2 home win against Panetolikos.

On 11 January 2020, Jendrišek scored in a 3–1 home loss against his old club, Xanthi. The same year on 1 March, he scored in a 4–1 away loss against Panathinaikos.

In October 2020, Jendrišek had suffered a nerve-affecting cervical spinal injury that had initially threatened his career, causing unbearable pain.

=== Retirement ===
On 26 January 2024, Jendrišek announced his retirement from professional football.

== International career ==
Jendrišek has been capped for the Slovakia national under-21 team before debuting for the country's senior national team on 11 October 2008 in a 2010 FIFA World Cup qualifying match against San Marino.

On 11 February 2009, Jendrišek scored his first senior international goal in a friendly match against Cyprus, netting the second goal in Slovakia's 3–2 defeat. On 1 April, he scored his first competitive international goal at senior level, netting the decisive second goal in Slovakia's 2–1 away victory against the Czech Republic, the first away win for Slovakia in the Czech Republic–Slovakia football rivalry, in 2010 FIFA World Cup qualification.

In the 2010 World Cup finals in South Africa, Jendrišek featured in all three of Slovakia's group stage matches.

== Career statistics ==
=== Club ===
As of 30 October 2020

Appearances and goals by club, season and competition
Club	Season	League			National Cup		Continental		Other		Total	
Club	Season	Division	Apps	Goals	Apps	Goals	Apps	Goals	Apps	Goals	Apps	Goals
Ružomberok	2003–04	Slovak First League	3	1			—		—		3	1
Ružomberok	2004–05	Slovak First League	17	8	0	0	—		—		17	8
Ružomberok	2005–06	Slovak First League	34	21	0	0	—		—		34	21
Ružomberok	2006–07	Slovak First League	2	0	—		1	0	—		3	0
Ružomberok	Total		56	30	0	0	1	0	—		57	30
Hannover 96 (loan)	2006–07	Bundesliga	9	0	2	0	—		—		11	0
1. FC Kaiserslautern	2007–08	2. Bundesliga	26	5	2	0	—		—		28	5
1. FC Kaiserslautern	2008–09	2. Bundesliga	33	14	1	0	—		—		34	14
1. FC Kaiserslautern	2009–10	2. Bundesliga	31	15	2	1	—		—		33	16
1. FC Kaiserslautern	Total		90	34	5	1	—		—		95	35
Schalke 04	2010–11	Bundesliga	3	0	1	0	1	0	0	0	5	0
SC Freiburg	2010–11	Bundesliga	8	0	—		—		—		8	0
SC Freiburg	2011–12	Bundesliga	19	2	1	0	—		—		20	2
SC Freiburg	2012–13	Bundesliga	9	0	0	0	—		—		9	0
SC Freiburg	Total		36	2	1	0	—		—		37	2
Energie Cottbus	2013–14	2. Bundesliga	29	1	2	1	—		—		31	2
Spartak Trnava	2014–15	Slovak First League	13	5	1	1	2	0	—		16	6
Cracovia	2014–15	Ekstraklasa	17	4	2	0	—		—		19	4
Cracovia	2015–16	Ekstraklasa	35	13	3	1	—		—		38	14
Cracovia	2016–17	Ekstraklasa	31	1	1	0	2	0	—		34	1
Cracovia	Total		83	18	6	1	2	0	—		91	19
Xanthi	2017–18	Super League Greece	30	11	3	1	—		—		33	12
Xanthi	2018–19	Super League Greece	23	8	2	0	—		—		25	8
Xanthi	Total		53	19	5	1	—		—		58	20
Volos	2019–20	Super League Greece	24	4	1	0	—		—		25	4
Volos	2020–21	Super League Greece	4	0	—		—		—		4	0
Volos	Total		28	4	1	0	—		—		29	4
Career total			400	113	27	5	6	0	0	0	430	118

=== International ===
Scores and results list Slovakia's goal tally first, score column indicates score after each Jendrišek goal.

List of international goals scored by Erik Jendrišek
No.	Date	Venue	Opponent	Score	Result	Competition
1	11 February 2009	Makario Stadium, Nicosia, Cyprus	Cyprus	2–3	2–3	Cyprus International Tournament 2009
2	1 April 2009	AXA Arena, Prague, Czech Republic	Czech Republic	2–1	2–1	2010 FIFA World Cup qualifying
3	9 February 2011	Stade Josy Barthel, Luxembourg, Luxembourg	Luxembourg	1–0	1–2	Friendly
4	23 May 2014	NTC Senec, Senec, Slovakia	Montenegro	2–0	2–0	Friendly

== Honours ==
Ružomberok

- Slovak First Football League: 2005–06
- Slovak Cup: 2005–06

Individual

- Slovak First Football League top scorer: 2005–06
- Slovak First Football League Player of the Month: September 2021
