= Lubomír Blaha =

Czech footballer

Personal information
- Date of birth: 28 March 1978 (age 48)
- Place of birth: Uherský Brod, Czechoslovakia
- Height: 1.94 m (6 ft 4 1/2 in)
- Position: Striker

Youth career
- 1984–1995: Spartak Uherský Brod
- 1995–1996: Svit Zlín
- 1996–1997: Baník Ostrava

Senior career*
Years	Team	Apps	(Gls)
1997–1998	Baník Ostrava	2	(0)
1998–2001	Synot Staré Město	50	(12)
2002	Sparta Prague	7	(0)
2002–2004	Slovan Liberec	13	(3)
2003	→ Tescoma Zlín (loan)	13	(1)
2003–2004	→ Viktoria Plzeň (loan)	27	(1)
2005	Aberdeen	8	(0)
2005	Kuban Krasnodar	5	(0)
2006	Spartak Trnava	30	(11)
2007–2009	Viktoria Žižkov	11	(0)
2008–2009	→ Dukla Prague (loan)	19	(4)
2010–2011	Ostbahn XI	10	(2)
- * Club domestic league appearances and goals

Lubomír Blaha (born 28 March 1978) is a Czech former professional football player. He was born in Uherský Brod. Blaha played in Scotland for Aberdeen; he signed for them in March 2005 and left in May 2005 after making eight appearances.
