= Jaroslav Hrabal =

Slovak footballer

Personal information
- Full name: Jaroslav Hrabal
- Date of birth: 8 September 1974 (age 52)
- Place of birth: Bánovce nad Bebravou, Czechoslovakia
- Height: 1.86 m (6 ft 1 in)
- Position: Centre back

Youth career
- Spartak Trnava

Senior career*
Years	Team	Apps	(Gls)
1992–2007	Spartak Trnava	276	(23)
1994–1995	→ Trenčín (loan)	0	(0)
2008–2009	→ Bánovce		
2009	→ OŠK Pečeňany (loan)		

International career^{‡}
1999–2000	Slovakia	11	(1)

Managerial career
- 2008–?: Bánovce (assistant coach)
- * Club domestic league appearances and goals as of 11 April 2013 ‡ National team caps and goals as of 11 April 2013

Jaroslav Hrabal (born 8 September 1974) is a retired Slovak footballer who is best known for playing for FC Spartak Trnava. He made12 appearances for the Slovakia national football team between 1999 and 2000.
