= Josef Dvorník =

Czech footballer

Personal information
- Date of birth: 23 April 1978 (age 48)
- Place of birth: Přílepy, Czechoslovakia
- Height: 1.89 m (6 ft 2 in)
- Position: Defender

Youth career
- 1983–1986: Sokol Hlinsko pod Hostýnem
- 1986–1995: Holešov

Senior career*
| Years | Team | Apps | (Gls) |
| 1996–1997 | Tescoma Zlín | 1 | (0) |
| 1997–2006 | Baník Ostrava | 101 | (1) |
| 2006–2007 | Ružomberok | 66 | (8) |
| 2007–2008 | Manisaspor | 11 | (1) |
| 2008–2011 | Zbrojovka Brno | 58 | (1) |
| 2011–2013 | Baník Sokolov | 49 | (4) |
| 2013–2016 | Opava | 72 | (2) |

Managerial career
- 2017–2019: Opava (assistant)
- 2020–2021: Teplice (assistant)
- 2021–2023: Opava (youth)
- 2023–2026: Baník Ostrava B
- 2026: Baník Ostrava
- * Club domestic league appearances and goals as of 1 March 2020

Josef Dvorník (born 23 April 1978 in Přílepy) is a Czech football coach and former player. He played most of his career in Czech First League teams.

== Honours ==
=== Player ===
Baník Ostrava

- Czech First League: 2003–04
- Czech Cup: 2004–05
