= Róbert Rák =

Slovak footballer

Personal information
- Full name: Róbert Rák
- Date of birth: 15 January 1978 (age 48)
- Place of birth: Rimavská Sobota, Czechoslovakia
- Height: 1.69 m (5 ft 6 1/2 in)
- Position: Forward

Senior career*
Years	Team	Apps	(Gls)
1996–1997	Tauris Rimavská Sobota	7	(0)
1997	Dukla Banská Bystrica	9	(0)
1998	Diósgyőr	1	(0)
1998–2001	Tauris Rimavská Sobota		
2001–2003	Ružomberok	62	(6)
2004–2006	Nitra	75	(58)
2006–2007	Ružomberok	29	(11)
2007–2008	Dinamo Minsk	33	(16)
2008–2012	Nitra	92	(39)
2012	→ Zemplín Michalovce (loan)	9	(2)
2012–2014	ATSV Ober-Grafendorf		
Total		228	(79)
- * Club domestic league appearances and goals as of 30 May 2012

Róbert Rák (born 15 January 1978 in Rimavská Sobota) is a retired Slovak professional footballer who played as a striker for MFK Zemplín Michalovce and FC Nitra. He was top goalscorer of the Corgoň Liga twice. First at the 2005–06 season, scoring 21 goals and second time at the 2009–10 season, scoring 18 goals.

== Personal life ==
Rák comes from the Hungarian minority in Slovakia. His sister, named Viktória, is a popular actress in Slovakia, who played in the Hungarian language Thalia Theatre in Košice.

== Match fixing ==
Rák was involved in a match fixing scandal in Slovak football that came to light in September 2013. Allegedly, Rák together with six other football players, including the former Slovak international Ivan Hodúr, were supposed to have participated in fixing games of FK DAC 1904 Dunajská Streda. Rák was eventually given a 15-year suspension by the Disciplinary Committee of the Slovak FA, which was later extended worldwide by the FIFA Disciplinary Committee.
