= Zdeno Štrba =

Slovak footballer (born 1976)

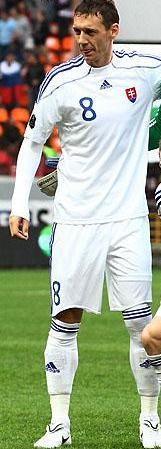
- Štrba with Slovakia in 2010

Personal information
- Date of birth: 9 June 1976 (age 50)
- Place of birth: Krásno nad Kysucou, Czechoslovakia
- Height: 1.87 m (6 ft 2 in)
- Position: Defensive midfielder

Youth career
- Tatran Krásno nad Kysucou
- Dukla Banská Bystrica

Senior career*
Years	Team	Apps	(Gls)
1998–2002	Matador Púchov	78	(5)
2003–2009	Žilina	191	(9)
2009–2010	Skoda Xanthi	36	(4)
2011	Žilina	8	(0)
2012	Spartak Myjava	18	(3)
2013–2015	SC St. Martin	53	(9)
Total		384	(30)

International career
2003–2010	Slovakia	25	(0)
- * Club domestic league appearances and goals as of 19 August 2019

Zdeno Štrba (born 9 June 1976) is a Slovak former professional footballer who played as a defensive midfielder. He played 25 games for the Slovakia national team.

== Club career ==
On 3 June 2009, Štrba has signed two-year contract for Skoda Xanthi for a fee €150,000. In December 2010, he terminated his contract with Xanthi after mutual consent and came back to Žilina, signing one-and-a-half-year contract.

Štrba played his first international match against Cyprus on 13 February 2003. He was present in six of the ten matches at the 2010 World Cup qualification and Slovakia manager Vladimír Weiss called up him to the final 23-men squad for the 2010 FIFA World Cup.
