= Štadión Petržalka =

Football stadium in Bratislava, Slovakia

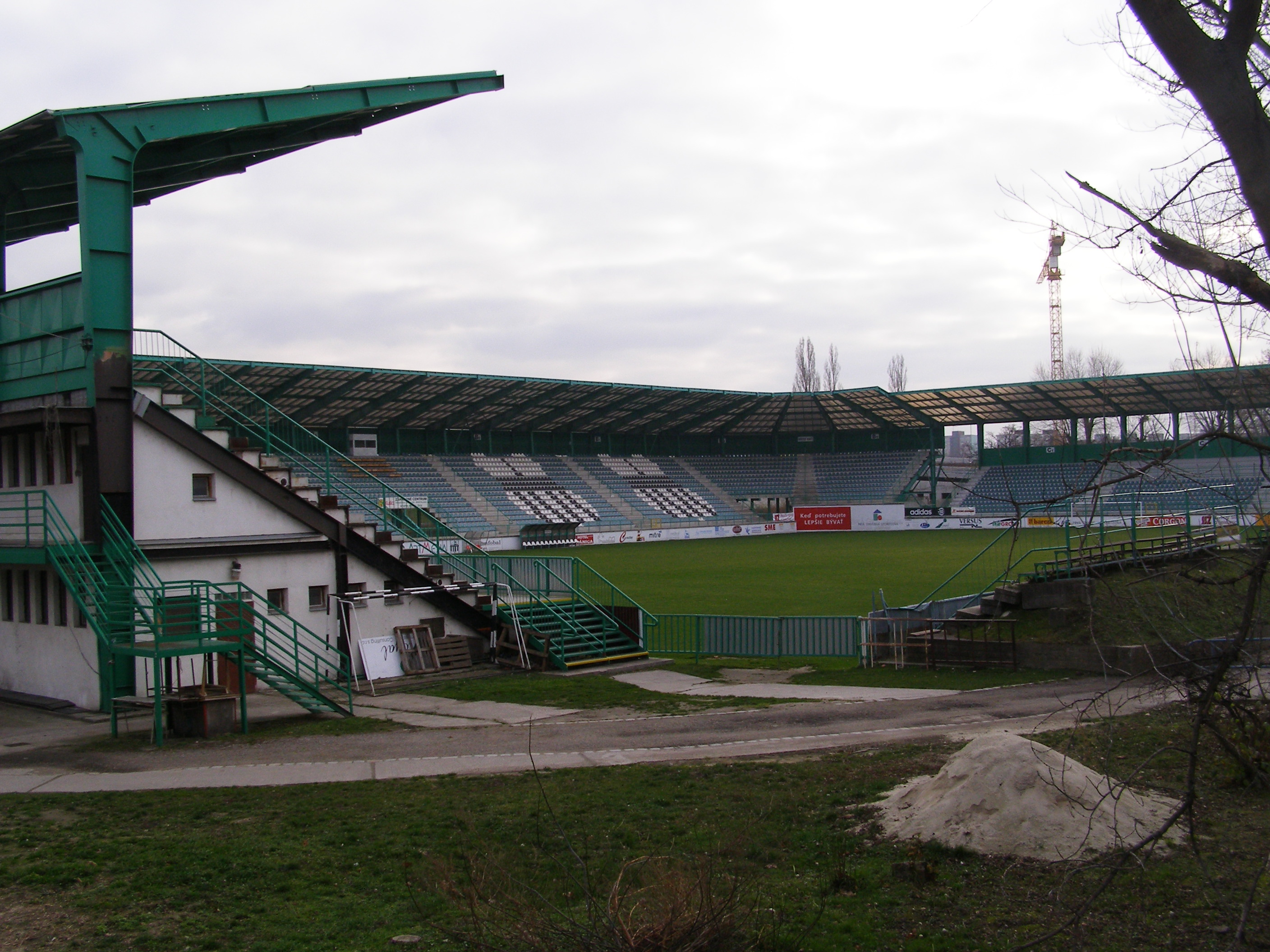
- Interactive map of Štadión Petržalka
- Location: Bratislava, Slovakia
- Coordinates: 48°08′0″N 17°06′57″E
- Capacity: 7,500

Construction
- Opened: 1990
- Closed: 2008
- Demolished: 2012

Tenant
- Artmedia Petržalka (1990–2012)

Štadión Petržalka (also called (Štadión) za Starým mostom) was a football stadium in Bratislava, Slovakia, in the borough of Petržalka. It served as the home ground of MFK Petržalka until closing in 2008.

== History ==
=== First pitch ===
The first sample football match of Pozsonyi Torna Egyesület (PTE) was announced to be played on 25 September 1898, but due to the tragic matters in the Emperors' family (Elisabeth of Bavaria died on 10 September 1898) it was postponed to 2 October 1898. The rules of the game were explained to the crowd before the match. The match was played between members of PTE in both teams at the Ligetfalu highschool playground. There was no regular football pitch in Pressburg at that time, so PTE used the plain terrain to play its home matches in the beginning years.

=== Štadión za Starým mostom (PTE stadium) ===
During an extraordinary club meeting on 29 September 1899 the decision was made to build a permanent pitch for PTE nearby to the Danube river, railway to the Wien and City Park. The stadium was built at the end of the 19th century for PTE in a year. The grand opening of the new stadium was officially on 25 September 1900. PTE won the match against Magyar Football Club Budapest 3–2, the first PTEs' win ever against the team from Budapest. This stadium was used for Bratislava regional championship until the stadium for I. Čsl. ŠK Bratislava was built in the end of the 1920s. More than 100 years later Artmedia still used to play their home matches at the same place – named Štadión za Starým mostom.

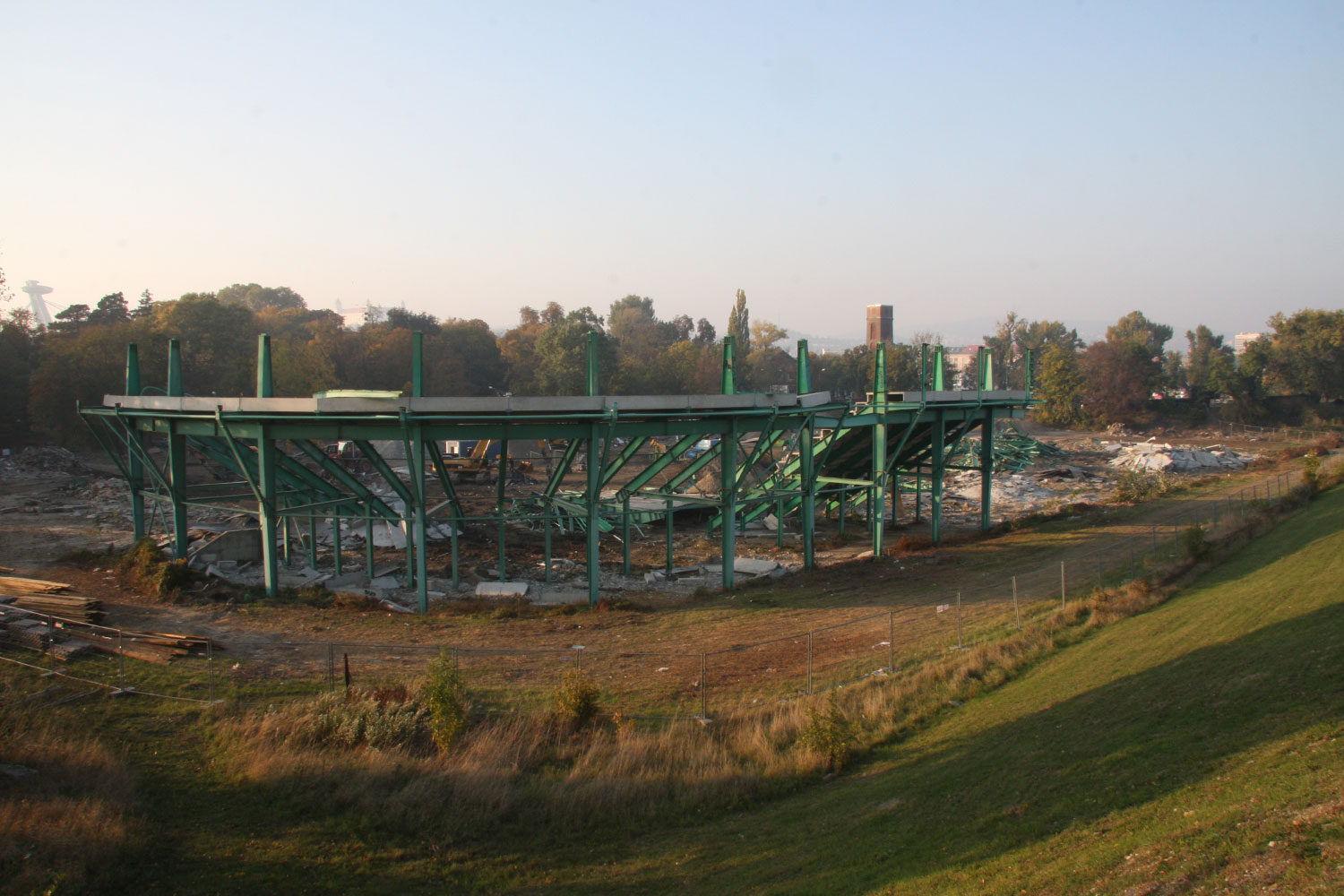
Demolition of Petržalka stadium (Oct 2012)

The pitch at the place of the stadium was there for more than 100 years. Even before World War II, the stadium was the venue of several international matches. Although destroyed during the war, a new stand soon arose from the ruins of the old one and the stadium started to resemble its future look. Major changes occurred in its last ten years, following improvements in Artmedia's footballing results. Stands behind the goals were totally reconstructed and a new one was built along the pitch.

As the stadium did not meet some of the UEFA criteria, the club was forced to play its international matches elsewhere. Notably, they played their 2005–06 UEFA Champions League campaign at Tehelné pole, home venue of crosstown rivals Slovan Bratislava. The stadium was closed in 2008 and demolition concluded in October 2012.
