= 2005–06 Slovak Superliga =

Corgoň Liga
- Season: 2005–06
- Dates: 16 July 2005 – 31 May 2006
- Champions: MFK Ružomberok
- Relegated: Matador Púchov
- Champions League: MFK Ružomberok
- UEFA Cup: Artmedia Bratislava; Spartak Trnava
- Intertoto Cup: FC Nitra
- Matches played: 180
- Goals scored: 456 (2.53 per match)
- Top goalscorer: Róbert Rák; Erik Jendrišek (21 goals)
- Average attendance: ▲2,895

The 2005–06 Slovak First Football League (known as the Slovak Corgoň Liga for sponsorship reasons) was the 13th season of first-tier football league in Slovakia, since its establishment in 1993. It began on 16 July 2005 and ended on 31 May 2006. FC Artmedia Bratislava were the defending champions.

== Format changes ==
The season was a last season where they competed 10 teams, because as the organization of Corgoň Liga decided that the league expanded to 12 teams into following season. Therefore, the three teams from the 2. Liga was promoted to Corgoň Liga.

== Teams ==
A total of 10 teams was contested in the league, including 9 sides from the 2004–05 season and one promoted from the 2. Liga.

Relegation for FC Rimavská Sobota to the 2005–06 2. Liga was confirmed on 29 May 2005. The one relegated team were replaced by FC Nitra.

=== Stadiums and locations ===
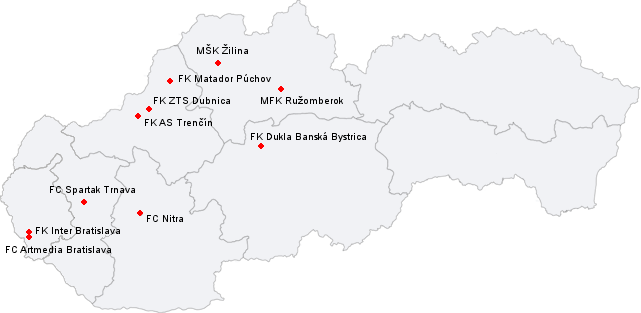
Location of teams in 2005–06 Corgoň Liga

Team	Home city	Stadium	Capacity
Artmedia Bratislava	Petržalka	Štadión Petržalka	7,500
FK AS Trenčín	Trenčín	Štadión na Sihoti	4,500
Dukla Banská Bystrica	Banská Bystrica	SNP Stadium	10,000
FK Inter Bratislava	Bratislava	Štadión Pasienky	12,000
Matador Púchov	Púchov	Mestský štadión	6,614
FC Nitra	Nitra	Štadión pod Zoborom	11,384
MFK Ružomberok	Ružomberok	Štadión MFK Ružomberok	4,817
MŠK Žilina	Žilina	Štadión pod Dubňom	11,181
Spartak Trnava	Trnava	Štadión Antona Malatinského	18,448
ZTS Dubnica nad Váhom	Dubnica	Štadión Zimný	5,450

== League table ==
Pos	Team	Pld	W	D	L	GF	GA	GD	Pts	Qualification or relegation
1	Ružomberok (C)	36	26	2	8	65	28	+37	80	Qualification for Champions League second qualifying round
2	Artmedia Bratislava	36	23	5	8	58	33	+25	74	Qualification for UEFA Cup first qualifying round
3	Spartak Trnava	36	21	5	10	57	31	+26	68	Qualification for UEFA Cup first qualifying round
4	Žilina	36	18	6	12	69	44	+25	60	
5	Nitra	36	12	9	15	42	48	−6	45	Qualification for Intertoto Cup first round
6	Dukla Banská Bystrica	36	12	6	18	37	42	−5	42	
7	Trenčín	36	11	9	16	31	49	−18	42	
8	ZTS Dubnica	36	10	10	16	41	55	−14	40	
9	Inter Bratislava	36	7	9	20	27	62	−35	30	
10	Matador Púchov (R)	36	7	5	24	29	64	−35	26	Relegation to 1. Liga

Source: RSSSF.org
Rules for classification: 1) points; 2) goal difference; 3) number of goals scored.
(C) Champions; (R) Relegated

== Results ==
=== First half of season ===
Home \ Away	ART	BB	DUB	INT	NIT	PÚC	RUŽ	TRE	TRN	ŽIL
Artmedia Bratislava		2–0	2–2	7–1	1–1	2–0	2–1	3–0	0–2	1–1
Dukla Banská Bystrica	3–0		4–1	1–0	2–0	3–1	0–2	2–0	0–1	0–4
ZTS Dubnica	0–2	1–0		1–1	0–1	1–1	3–0	1–1	0–3	2–4
Inter Bratislava	1–2	2–0	0–3		1–2	1–1	0–3	0–0	1–0	0–4
Nitra	1–0	0–3	0–0	2–0		3–1	2–2	3–1	3–1	0–2
Matador Púchov	1–2	0–1	0–2	3–0	0–0		0–2	2–1	1–3	1–5
Ružomberok	1–0	2–0	1–0	1–2	2–0	3–1		1–0	4–1	2–0
Trenčín	1–1	2–1	2–0	2–0	2–1	1–1	1–0		0–0	0–1
Spartak Trnava	1–3	1–0	2–1	3–0	2–0	4–0	2–0	1–0		4–1
Žilina	1–2	2–0	3–0	5–2	2–5	1–2	0–1	1–2	1–0	

Source: RSSSF.org
Legend: Blue = home team win; Yellow = draw; Red = away team win.

=== Second half of season ===
Home \ Away	ART	BB	DUB	INT	NIT	PÚC	RUŽ	TRE	TRN	ŽIL
Artmedia Bratislava		1–0	3–2	1–0	2–0	1–0	2–0	3–1	2–1	1–2
Dukla Banská Bystrica	0–0		2–3	3–0 (Note: The match between Dukla Banská Bystrica and Inter Bratislava (originally finished 2–1) was awarded with a 3–0 win for home team.)	2–0	2–0	0–5	0–1	1–2	2–2
ZTS Dubnica	0–1	0–0		2–1	2–1	0–1	1–1	1–1	0–2	1–4
Inter Bratislava	1–2	1–1	0–2		2–0	2–1	0–1	0–0	2–2	1–1
Nitra	0–2	2–1	2–2	1–0		1–1	2–3	3–0	1–1	2–2
Matador Púchov	1–3	0–2	1–3	0–1	1–0		0–2	2–1	0–2	0–1
Ružomberok	3–0	1–0	3–1	3–1	2–0	3–1		3–0	2–1	2–1
Trenčín	3–1	0–0	1–2	1–2	1–1	1–3	1–0		1–0	2–1
Spartak Trnava	1–0	1–1	4–1	0–0	0–1	1–0	2–1	3–0		2–1
Žilina	0–1	2–0	0–0	1–1	2–1	3–1	1–2	5–0	2–1	

Source: RSSSF.org
Legend: Blue = home team win; Yellow = draw; Red = away team win.

== Season statistics ==
=== Top scorers ===
Rank	Player	Club	Goals
1	(Slovakia) Róbert Rák	Nitra	21
1	(Slovakia) Erik Jendrišek	Ružomberok	21
3	(Slovakia) Róbert Semeník	Banská Bystrica	18
4	(Czech Republic) Jan Nezmar	Ružomberok	17
4	(Slovakia) Stanislav Šesták	Žilina	17
6	(Slovakia) Pavol Straka	Žilina	16
7	(Slovakia) Miroslav Kriss	Spartak Trnava	12
8	(Slovakia) Vladimír Kožuch	Spartak Trnava	9
8	(Czech Republic) Lubomír Blaha	Spartak Trnava	9
10	(Slovakia) Marek Bakoš	Matador Púchov	8
10	(Slovakia) Juraj Halenár	Artmedia Bratislava	8
10	(Czech Republic) Lukáš Hartig	Artmedia Bratislava	8
10	(Slovakia) Branislav Fodrek	Artmedia Bratislava	8
10	(Slovakia) Michal Filo	ZTS Dubnica	8

== See also ==
- 2005–06 Slovak Cup
- 2005–06 2. Liga (Slovakia)
