= ŠK Eldus Močenok =

- Full name: Športový klub Eldus Močenok
- Nickname(s): -
- Founded: 2000
- Dissolved: 2007
- Ground: SK Eldus Mocenok Stadium, Močenok
- Capacity: 2,000
- Manager: Jozef Kollárik
- League: 4. liga V.level South-east
Home colours	Away colours

ŠK Eldus Močenok was a Slovak football team, based in the town of Močenok.

In 2007, the club was dissolved due to financial problems.
