= Vladimír Kožuch =

Slovak footballer

Personal information
- Full name: Vladimír Kožuch
- Date of birth: 15 October 1975 (age 51)
- Place of birth: Malacky, Czechoslovakia
- Height: 1.80 m (5 ft 11 in)
- Position: Forward

Youth career
- ŠK Malacky

Senior career*
Years	Team	Apps	(Gls)
1995–1996	Inter Bratislava	10	(0)
1996–1999	Tatran Prešov	87	(22)
2000–2002	Slovan Liberec	47	(7)
2002	→ Viktoria Plzeň (loan)	10	(1)
2002–2010	Spartak Trnava	224	(63)

International career
1999–2000	Slovakia	17	(2)
- * Club domestic league appearances and goals

Vladimír Kožuch (born 15 October 1975) is a former Slovak football striker. He played for Tatran Prešov before moving to Czech side Slovan Liberec in 2000. He played in the 2000 Czech Cup final as Liberec beat Baník Ratíškovice to win the competition. The side finished fifth in his first full season with the club. In March 2002 he moved to Viktoria Plzeň of the second league on loan for the rest of the season. After finishing his playing career, Kožuch worked as an assistant coach under Pavel Hoftych at Spartak Trnava from 2011.

== Honours ==
Slovan Liberec

- Czech Cup: 1999–2000
