= Azerbaijan national football team results (1992–1999) =

This article details the fixtures and results of the Azerbaijan national football team in 1990s (between 1992 and 1999).

== 1992–1999 ==
Type	GP	W	D	L	GF	GA
Friendly Matches	23	8	6	9	24	33
1993 ECO Cup	2	2	0	0	5	2
UEFA Euro 1996 qualifying	10	0	1	9	2	29
1998 FIFA World Cup qualification	8	1	0	7	3	22
UEFA Euro 2000 qualifying	10	1	1	8	6	26
Total	53	12	8	33	40	112

=== 1992 ===
17 September 1992 Friendly	Georgia	6 – 3	Azerbaijan	Gurjaani, Georgia
	Kizilashvili 20', 48'; Daraselia 52'; Arveladze 69'; Gogichaishvili 71' (pen.); Jishkariani 79' (pen.)	Report	42', 85' (pen.) Suleymanov; 77' Rzayev	Stadium: David Kipiani Stadium; Attendance: 3,000; Referee: Guram Sepiashvili (Georgia)

=== 1993 ===
25 May 1993 Friendly	Azerbaijan	1 – 0	Georgia	Ganja, Azerbaijan
AZST (UTC+5)	Lobzhanidze 35' (o.g.)	Report		Stadium: Ganja City Stadium, Attendance: 9,500; Referee: Rustam Ragimov (Azerbaijan)

6 June 1993 1993 ECO Cup GS	Azerbaijan	2 – 0	Tajikistan	Tehran, Iran
AZST (UTC+5)	Rzayev 55' (pen.); Alakbarov 62'	Report		Stadium: Azadi Stadium; Attendance: 10,000; Referee: (Iran)

7 June 1993 1993 ECO Cup GS	Azerbaijan	3 – 2	Kyrgyzstan	Tehran, Iran
AZST (UTC+5)	Lukin 43', 63'; Rzayev 30'	Report	Kovalenko 40'; Ishenbaev 76'	Stadium: Azadi Stadium; Attendance: 5,000; Referee: (Iran)

=== 1994 ===
19 April 1994 Friendly	Malta	5 – 0	Azerbaijan	Ta' Qali, Malta
	Saliba 2'; Laferla 17'; Busuttil 69'; Camilleri 78'; Scerri 89'	Report		Stadium: National Stadium; Attendance: 1,608; Referee: Abdullah Salem (Libya)

1 September 1994 Friendly	Moldova	2 – 1	Azerbaijan	Chişinău, Moldova
	Cleşcenco 11', 41'	(Report)	Alakbarov 83'	Stadium: Stadionul Republican; Attendance: 300; Referee: Anatoli Ianeţ (Moldova)

7 September 1994 Euro 1996 Q	Romania	3 – 0	Azerbaijan	Bucharest, Romania
	Belodedici 42'; Petrescu 57'; Răducioiu 87'	Report		Stadium: Stadionul Steaua; Attendance: 10,000; Referee: Robert Sedlacek (Austria)

12 October 1994 Euro 1996 Q	Poland	1 – 0	Azerbaijan	Mielec, Poland
	Juskowiak 44'	Report		Stadium: Stadion Stali Mielec; Attendance: 11,000; Referee: Ilkka Koho (Finland)

16 November 1994 Euro 1996 Q	Azerbaijan	0 – 2	Israel	Trabzon, Turkey
		Report	30' R. Harazi; 51' Rosenthal	Stadium: Hüseyin Avni Aker Stadium; Attendance: 3,000; Referee: László Vágner (Hungary)

13 December 1994 Euro 1996 Q	Azerbaijan	0 – 2	France	Trabzon, Turkey
		Report	25' Papin; 56' Loko	Stadium: Hüseyin Avni Aker Stadium; Attendance: 3,000; Referee: Rune Pedersen (Norway)

=== 1995 ===
29 March 1995 Euro 1996 Q	Slovakia	4 – 1	Azerbaijan	Košice, Slovakia
	Timko 40', 51'; Tittel 34'; Dubovský 45' (pen.)	Report	Suleymanov 80' (pen.)	Stadium: Všešportový areál Attendance: 12,450; Referee: Vassilios Nikakis (Greece)

26 April 1995 Euro 1996 Q	Azerbaijan	1 – 4	Romania	Trabzon, Turkey
	Suleymanov 35'	Report	Răducioiu 2' (pen.), 69', 76'; Dumitrescu 39'	Stadium: Hüseyin Avni Aker Stadium; Attendance: 372; Referee: Dimitar Momirov (Bulgaria)

16 August 1995 Euro 1996 Q	Azerbaijan	0 – 1	Slovakia	Trabzon, Turkey
		Report	Jančula 60'	Stadium: Hüseyin Avni Aker Stadium; Attendance: 200; Referee: Alain Hamer (Luxembourg)

6 September 1995 Euro 1996 Q	France	10 – 0	Azerbaijan	Auxerre, France
	Desailly 13'; Djorkaeff 17', 78'; Guérin 33'; Pedros 49'; Leboeuf 54', 74'; Dugarry 66'; Zidane 72'; Cocard 90'	Report		Stadium: Stade de l'Abbé-Deschamps; Attendance: 13,479; Referee: Alfred Micallef (Malta)

11 October 1995 Euro 1996 Q	Israel	2 – 0	Azerbaijan	Tel Aviv, Israel
	R. Harazi 31', 90'	Report		Stadium: Bloomfield Stadium; Attendance: 7,000; Referee: Claude Détruche (Switzerland)

13 December 1995 Euro 1996 Q	Azerbaijan	0 – 0	Poland	Trabzon, Turkey
		Report		Stadium: Hüseyin Avni Aker Stadium; Attendance: 200; Referee: Leslie Mottram (Scotland)

=== 1996 ===
16 February 1996 Friendly	Estonia	0 – 0	Azerbaijan	Famagusta, Cyprus
		Report		Stadium: Antonis Papadopoulos; Attendance: 50; Referee: Loizos Loizou (Cyprus)

27 February 1996 Friendly	Faroe Islands	0 – 3	Azerbaijan	Famagusta, Cyprus
		Report	Lychkin 10'; Huseynov 23' (pen.); Gurbanov 30'	Stadium: Antonis Papadopoulos; Attendance: 50; Referee: Andreas Georghiou (Cyprus)

9 April 1996 Friendly	Azerbaijan	0 – 1	Turkey	Baku, Azerbaijan
		Report	Zafer 48'	Stadium: Tofiq Bahramov Stadium; Attendance: 3,200; Referee: Sergo Kvaratskhelia (Georgia)

27 May 1996 Friendly	Belarus	2 – 2	Azerbaijan	Molodechno, Belarus
	Kachura 49' (pen.); Kulchiy 59'	Report	Gurbanov 53'; İdiqov 75'	Stadium: Metallurg Stadium; Attendance: 5,200; Referee: Sergiejus Slyva (Lithuania)

2 June 1996 1998 WCQ	Norway	5 – 0	Azerbaijan	Oslo, Norway
	Solbakken 7', 46'; Solskjær 37', 89'; Strandli 59'	Report		Stadium: Ullevaal; Attendance: 14,020; Referee: Alan Snoddy (Northern Ireland)

31 August 1996 1998 WCQ	Azerbaijan	1 – 0	Switzerland	Baku, Azerbaijan
	Rzayev 26'	Report		Stadium: Tofiq Bahramov Stadium; Attendance: 15,000; Referee: Ryszard Wojcik (Poland)

7 October 1996 Friendly	Oman	2 – 0	Azerbaijan	Muscat, Oman
	Goal	Report		Stadium: Sultan Qaboos Sports Complex; Referee: Ibrahim Abdullah Al Omar (Saudi Arabia)

10 November 1996 1998 WCQ	Azerbaijan	0 – 3	Hungary	Baku, Azerbaijan
		(Report)	Nyilas 42', 67'; Urbán 77'	Stadium: Tofiq Bahramov Stadium; Attendance: 30,000; Referee: Dragutin Poljak (Croatia)

=== 1997 ===
1 March 1997 Friendly	Estonia	2 – 0	Azerbaijan	Larnaca, Cyprus
	Kristal 35'; Zelinski 76'	(Report)		Stadium: Antonis Papadopoulos Stadium; Attendance: 50; Referee: Antonis Panayiotou (Cyprus)

22 March 1997 Friendly	Azerbaijan	3 – 0	Turkmenistan	Baku, Azerbaijan
	Abishov 12'; Huseynov 86'; Gurbanov 88'	(Report)		Stadium: Tofiq Bahramov Stadium; Referee: Khagani Mamedov (Azerbaijan)

2 April 1997 1998 WCQ	Azerbaijan	1 – 2	Finland	Baku, Azerbaijan
	Suleymanov 83' (pen.)	(Report)	26' Litmanen; 64' Paatelainen	Stadium: Tofiq Bahramov Stadium; Attendance: 19,000; Referee: Graham Poll (England)

25 April 1997 Friendly	Turkmenistan	2 – 0	Azerbaijan	Ashgabat, Turkmenistan
	Agabayev 54'; Magdiýew 75'	(Report)		Stadium: Nisa-Çandybil Stadium; Attendance: 2,000; Referee: Khudainazar Redzhepov (Turkmenistan)

4 June 1997 Friendly	Estonia	1 – 0	Azerbaijan	Viljandi, Estonia
	Kirs 73'	(Report)		Stadium: Viljandi linnastaadion Attendance: 1,500; Referee: Romans Lajuks (Latvia)

8 June 1997 1998 WCQ	Finland	3 – 0	Azerbaijan	Helsinki, Finland
	Vanhala 60'; Litmanen 65'; Sumiala 82'	(Report)		Stadium: Olympiastadion; Attendance: 13,417; Referee: Alain Hamer (Luxembourg

19 August 1997 Friendly	Latvia	0 – 0	Azerbaijan	Riga, Latvia
				Stadium: Daugava Stadium; Attendance: 2,500; Referee: Mika Peltola (Finland)

6 September 1997 1998 WCQ	Azerbaijan	0 – 1	Norway	Baku, Azerbaijan
		(Report)	42' Flo	Stadium: Tofiq Bahramov Stadium; Attendance: 10,000; Referee: Günter Benkö (Austria)

10 September 1997 1998 WCQ	Hungary	3 – 1	Azerbaijan	Budapest, Hungary
	Klausz 8'; Halmai 44'; Béla Illés 89'	(Report)	71' Lychkin	Stadium: Nepstadion; Attendance: 8,112; Referee: Atanas Uzunov (Bulgaria))

11 October 1997 1998 WCQ	Switzerland	5 – 0	Azerbaijan	Zürich, Switzerland
	Türkyilmaz 13', 23', 69' (pen.); Yakin 43'; Chapuisat 51'	(Report)		Stadium: Hardturm; Attendance: 7,600; Referee: John Rowbotham (Scotland)

=== 1998 ===
22 March 1998 Friendly	Azerbaijan	1 – 0	Moldova	Baku, Azerbaijan
	Huseynov 48'	Report		Stadium: Tofiq Bahramov Stadium; Attendance: 10,000; Referee: Asim Khudiev (Azerbaijan)

24 April 1998 Friendly	Azerbaijan	2 – 1	Uzbekistan	Baku, Azerbaijan
	Huseynov 75'; Sirkhayev 89'	Report	90' Qosimov	Stadium: Tofiq Bahramov Stadium; Attendance: 8,000; Referee: Khagani Mamedov (Azerbaijan)

16 May 1998 Friendly	Estonia	0 – 0	Azerbaijan	Viljandi, Estonia
		Report		Stadium: Viljandi linnastaadion Attendance: 1,500; Referee: Jouni Hyytiä (Finland)

24 June 1998 Friendly	Andorra	0 – 0	Azerbaijan	Viljandi, Estonia
		Report		Stadium: Viljandi linnastaadion Attendance: 20; Referee: Margus Kotter (Estonia)

26 June 1998 Friendly	Azerbaijan	2 – 1	Lithuania	Viljandi, Estonia
	Abishov 30', 58'	Report	18' Ražanauskas	Stadium: Viljandi linnastaadion Attendance: 1,500; Referee: Sten Kaldma (Estonia)

12 August 1998 Friendly	Azerbaijan	1 – 0	Georgia	Ganja, Azerbaijan
	Agaev 48'	Report		Stadium: Ganja City Stadium; Attendance: 5,000; Referee: Asim Khudiev (Azerbaijan)

5 September 1998 Euro 2000 Q	Slovakia	3 – 0	Azerbaijan	Košice, Slovakia
	Fabuš 17'; Dubovský 26' (pen.); Moravčík 37'	Report		Stadium: Lokomotíva Stadium; Attendance: 3,243; Referee: Alan Snoddy (Northern Ireland)

10 October 1998 Euro 2000 Q	Azerbaijan	0 – 4	Hungary	Baku, Azerbaijan
		Report	59' Dárdai; 85' (pen.) Illés; 88' Pisont; 90' Fehér	Stadium: Tofiq Bahramov Stadium; Attendance: 7,500; Referee: Stéphane Bré (France)

14 October 1998 Euro 2000 Q	Liechtenstein	2 – 1	Azerbaijan	Vaduz, Liechtenstein
	Frick 48'; Telser 49'	Report	59' Gurbanov	Stadium: Rheinpark Stadion; Attendance: 1,450; Referee: Herbert Barr (Northern Ireland)

28 November 1998 Friendly	Azerbaijan	2 – 1	Estonia	Ganja, Azerbaijan
	Sultanov 81'; K.Mammadov 87' (pen.)	Report	66' Kirs	Stadium: Ganja City Stadium; Attendance: 3,500; Referee: Khagani Mamedov (Azerbaijan)

=== 1999 ===
6 March 1999 Friendly	Estonia	2 – 2	Azerbaijan	Larnaca, Cyprus
	Viikmäe 47'; Saviauk 72'	Report	Gurbanov 1'; Lychkin 30' (pen.)	Stadium: Antonis Papadopoulos Stadium; Attendance: 100; Referee: Sotiris Constantinou (Cyprus)

26 March 1999 Euro 2000 Q	Portugal	7 – 0	Azerbaijan	Guimarães, Portugal
	Sá Pinto 28'; João Pinto 36', 77'; Paulo Madeira 67'; Conceição 75'; Pauleta 82', 83'	Report		Stadium: Estádio D. Afonso Henriques; Attendance: 14,650; Referee: Jacek Granat (Poland)

31 March 1999 Euro 2000 Q	Azerbaijan	0 – 1	Romania	Baku, Azerbaijan
		(Report)	49' Petre	Stadium: Tofiq Bahramov Stadium; Attendance: 30,000; Referee: Roelof Luinge (Netherlands)

5 June 1999 Euro 2000 Q	Azerbaijan	4 – 0	Liechtenstein	Baku, Azerbaijan
	Gurbanov 16'; Lychkin 42'; Tagizade 60'; Isayev 73'	Report		Stadium: Tofiq Bahramov Stadium; Attendance: 8,500; Referee: Knud Stadsgaard (Denmark)

9 June 1999 Euro 2000 Q	Romania	4 – 0	Azerbaijan	Bucharest, Romania
	Ganea 36'; Munteanu 44'; Vlădoiu 50'; Roşu 90'	Report		Stadium: Stadionul Steaua; Attendance: 5,200; Referee: Željko Širić (Croatia)

9 June 1999 Friendly	Uzbekistan	5 – 1	Azerbaijan	Samarkand, Uzbekistan
	Sharipov 6' (pen.); Shatskikh 25', 39', 58'; Bazarov 50'	Report	Tagizade 47'	Stadium: Dynamo Samarkand Stadium; Attendance: 10,000; Referee: Gairat Karimov (Uzbekistan)

4 September 1999 Euro 2000 Q	Azerbaijan	1 – 1	Portugal	Baku, Azerbaijan
	Tagizade 51'	Report	Figo 90'	Stadium: Tofiq Bahramov Stadium; Attendance: 8,000; Referee: Dermot Gallagher (England)

8 September 1999 Euro 2000 Q	Hungary	3 – 0	Azerbaijan	Budapest, Hungary
	Sebők 28'; Egressy 51'; Sowunmi 55'	Report		Stadium: Üllői úti Stadion; Attendance: 2,910; Referee: Saso Lazarevski (Macedonia)

9 October 1999 Euro 2000 Q	Azerbaijan	0 – 1	Slovakia	Baku, Azerbaijan
		Report	Labant 70'	Stadium: Tofiq Bahramov Stadium; Attendance: 6,000; Referee: Kyros Vassaras (Greece)
