= UEFA Euro 2000 qualifying Group 7 =

Football tournament qualification stage

Standings and results for Group 7 of the UEFA Euro 2000 qualifying tournament.

== Standings ==
Pos	Team	Pld	W	D	L	GF	GA	GD	Pts	Qualification	(Romania)	(Portugal)	(Slovakia)	(Hungary)	(Azerbaijan)	(Liechtenstein)
1	Romania	10	7	3	0	25	3	+22	24	Qualify for final tournament	—	1–1	0–0	2–0	4–0	7–0
2	Portugal	10	7	2	1	32	4	+28	23	Qualify for final tournament	0–1	—	1–0	3–0	7–0	8–0
3	Slovakia	10	5	2	3	12	9	+3	17		1–5	0–3	—	0–0	3–0	2–0
4	Hungary	10	3	3	4	14	10	+4	12		1–1	1–3	0–1	—	3–0	5–0
5	Azerbaijan	10	1	1	8	6	26	−20	4 (Note: Tied on head-to-head points (3). Head-to-head goal difference: Azerbaijan +3, Liechtenstein −3.)		0–1	1–1	0–1	0–4	—	4–0
6	Liechtenstein	10	1	1	8	2	39	−37	4		0–3	0–5	0–4	0–0	2–1	—

Source: UEFA
Rules for classification: Qualification tiebreakers

== Matches ==
2 September 1998
21:00 UTC+3

Romania	7–0	Liechtenstein
Popescu 18'; C. Munteanu 30'; Ilie 32', 45', 53'; Moldovan 56'; Haas 60' (o.g.)	Report

Stadionul Steaua, Bucharest
Attendance: 2,830
Referee: Salem Prolić (Bosnia and Herzegovina)
5 September 1998
20:15 UTC+2

Slovakia	3–0	Azerbaijan
Fabuš 17'; Dubovský 26' (pen.); Moravčík 37'	Report

Lokomotíva Stadium, Košice
Attendance: 3,243
Referee: Alan Snoddy (Northern Ireland)
6 September 1998
20:30 UTC+2

Hungary	1–3	Portugal
Horváth 32'	Report	Sá Pinto 56', 77'; Rui Costa 85'

Népstadion, Budapest
Attendance: 46,500
Referee: Urs Meier (Switzerland)

10 October 1998
17:00 UTC+5

Azerbaijan	0–4	Hungary
	Report	Dárdai 58'; Illés 85' (pen.); Pisont 87'; Fehér 90'

Tofiq Bahramov Stadium, Baku
Attendance: 7,500
Referee: Stéphane Bré (France)
10 October 1998
16:30 UTC+2

Liechtenstein	0–4	Slovakia
	Report	Sovič 3'; Dubovský 13'; Tomaschek 36', 61'

Rheinpark Stadion, Vaduz
Attendance: 1,840
Referee: Vladimir Antonov (Moldova)
10 October 1998
21:00 UTC+1

Portugal	0–1	Romania
	Report	D. Munteanu 90'

Estádio das Antas, Porto
Attendance: 37,354
Referee: Hellmut Krug (Germany)

14 October 1998
20:00 UTC+2

Liechtenstein	2–1	Azerbaijan
Frick 47'; Telser 49'	Report	Gurbanov 59'

Rheinpark Stadion, Vaduz
Attendance: 1,450
Referee: Herbert Barr (Northern Ireland)
14 October 1998
20:15 UTC+2

Hungary	1–1	Romania
Hrutka 82'	Report	Moldovan 50'

Népstadion, Budapest
Attendance: 25,000
Referee: Kim Milton Nielsen (Denmark)
14 October 1998
20:30 UTC+2

Slovakia	0–3	Portugal
	Report	João Pinto 17', 30'; Abel Xavier 70'

Tehelné pole, Bratislava
Attendance: 22,059
Referee: Oğuz Sarvan (Turkey)

26 March 1999
20:00 UTC±0

Portugal	7–0	Azerbaijan
Sá Pinto 28'; João Pinto 37', 71'; Paulo Madeira 68'; Conceição 75'; Pauleta 82', 84'	Report

Estádio D. Afonso Henriques, Guimarães
Attendance: 14,650
Referee: Jacek Granat (Poland)
27 March 1999
19:30 UTC+1

Hungary	5–0	Liechtenstein
J. Sebők 16'; V. Sebők 33', 41', 85'; Illés 73'	Report

Üllői úti Stadion, Budapest
Attendance: 9,534
Referee: Costas Kapitanis (Cyprus)
27 March 1999
20:30 UTC+2

Romania	0–0	Slovakia
	Report

Stadionul Național, Bucharest
Attendance: 9,750
Referee: Graham Barber (England)

31 March 1999
20:00 UTC+5

Azerbaijan	0–1	Romania
	Report	Petre 49'

Tofiq Bahramov Stadium, Baku
Attendance: 10,000
Referee: Roelof Luinge (Netherlands)
31 March 1999
18:00 UTC+2

Slovakia	0–0	Hungary
	Report

Tehelné pole, Bratislava
Attendance: 19,452
Referee: Claude Colombo (France)
31 March 1999
20:30 UTC+2

Liechtenstein	0–5	Portugal
	Report	Rui Costa 16' (pen.), 79'; Figo 48'; Paulo Madeira 53', 59'

Rheinpark Stadion, Vaduz
Attendance: 3,548
Referee: Gylfi Thór Orrason (Iceland)

5 June 1999
18:00 UTC+5

Azerbaijan	4–0	Liechtenstein
Gurbanov 15'; Liçkin 41'; Tagizade 60'; İsayev 73'	Report

Tofiq Bahramov Stadium, Baku
Attendance: 8,500
Referee: Knud Stadsgaard (Denmark)
5 June 1999
21:00 UTC+3

Romania	2–0	Hungary
Ilie 2'; D. Munteanu 15'	Report

Stadionul Steaua, Bucharest
Attendance: 23,000
Referee: Rune Pedersen (Norway)
5 June 1999
21:00 UTC+1

Portugal	1–0	Slovakia
Capucho 62'	Report

Estádio José de Alvalade, Lisbon
Attendance: 20,300
Referee: Claus Bo Larsen (Denmark)

9 June 1999
20:00 UTC+3

Romania	4–0	Azerbaijan
Ganea 36'; D. Munteanu 44'; Vlădoiu 50'; Roșu 90'	Report

Stadionul Steaua, Bucharest
Attendance: 5,200
Referee: Željko Širić (Croatia)
9 June 1999
20:15 UTC+2

Hungary	0–1	Slovakia
	Report	Fabuš 53'

Raba ETO, Győr
Attendance: 18,300
Referee: Manuel Díaz Vega (Spain)
9 June 1999
21:00 UTC+1

Portugal	8–0	Liechtenstein
Sá Pinto 29', 45', 52'; João Pinto 40', 60', 68'; Rui Costa 81', 90' (pen.)	Report

Estádio Municipal de Coimbra, Coimbra
Attendance: 14,020
Referee: Dietmar Drabek (Austria)

4 September 1999
17:30 UTC+5

Azerbaijan	1–1	Portugal
Tagizade 51'	Report	Figo 90'

Tofiq Bahramov Stadium, Baku
Attendance: 8,000
Referee: Dermot Gallagher (England)
4 September 1999
20:15 UTC+2

Liechtenstein	0–0	Hungary
	Report

Rheinpark Stadion, Vaduz
Attendance: 1,650
Referee: Sten Kaldma (Estonia)
4 September 1999
20:15 UTC+2

Slovakia	1–5	Romania
Labant 21' (pen.)	Report	Ilie 6'; Hagi 29'; Ciobotariu 65'; Moldovan 87', 90'

Tehelné pole, Bratislava
Attendance: 8,143
Referee: Graziano Cesari (Italy)

8 September 1999
16:00 UTC+2

Slovakia	2–0	Liechtenstein
S. Németh 4'; Karhan 55'	Report

Mestský štadión, Dubnica nad Váhom
Attendance: 3,052
Referee: Andreas Georgiou (Cyprus)
8 September 1999
21:00 UTC+3

Romania	1–1	Portugal
Hagi 37'	Report	Figo 45'

Stadionul Steaua, Bucharest
Attendance: 24,000
Referee: Hartmut Strampe (Germany)
8 September 1999
20:15 UTC+2

Hungary	3–0	Azerbaijan
Sebők 27'; Egressy 51'; Sowunmi 54'	Report

Üllői úti Stadion, Budapest
Attendance: 2,910
Referee: Sašo Lazarevski (Macedonia)

9 October 1999
18:00 UTC+5

Azerbaijan	0–1	Slovakia
	Report	Labant 71'

Tofiq Bahramov Stadium, Baku
Attendance: 6,000
Referee: Kyros Vassaras (Greece)
9 October 1999
19:30 UTC+2

Liechtenstein	0–3	Romania
	Report	Roșu 26'; Ganea 65', 75'

Rheinpark Stadion, Vaduz
Attendance: 2,200
Referee: Andrei Butenko (Russia)
9 October 1999
18:30 UTC+1

Portugal	3–0	Hungary
Rui Costa 15' (pen.); João Pinto 167'; Abel Xavier 57'	Report

Estádio da Luz, Lisbon
Attendance: 60,000
Referee: Kim Milton Nielsen (Denmark)

== Goalscorers ==
There were 91 goals scored in 30 matches, for an average of 3.03 goals per match.

8 goals

- (Portugal national football team) João Vieira Pinto

6 goals

- (Portugal national football team) Rui Costa
- (Portugal national football team) Ricardo Sá Pinto

5 goals

- (Romania national football team) Adrian Ilie

4 goals

- (Hungary national football team) Vilmos Sebők
- (Romania national football team) Viorel Moldovan

3 goals

- (Portugal national football team) Luís Figo
- (Portugal national football team) Paulo Madeira
- (Romania national football team) Ionel Ganea
- (Romania national football team) Dorinel Munteanu

2 goals

- (Azerbaijan national football team) Gurban Gurbanov
- (Azerbaijan national football team) Zaur Tagizade
- (Hungary national football team) Béla Illés
- (Portugal national football team) Pauleta
- (Portugal national football team) Abel Xavier
- (Romania national football team) Gheorghe Hagi
- (Romania national football team) Laurențiu Roșu
- (Slovakia national football team) Peter Dubovský
- (Slovakia national football team) Martin Fabuš
- (Slovakia national football team) Vladimír Labant
- (Slovakia national football team) Róbert Tomaschek

1 goal

- (Azerbaijan national football team) Mirbağır İsayev
- (Azerbaijan national football team) Vyacheslav Lychkin
- (Hungary national football team) Pál Dárdai
- (Hungary national football team) Gábor Egressy
- (Hungary national football team) Miklós Fehér
- (Hungary national football team) Ferenc Horváth
- (Hungary national football team) János Hrutka
- (Hungary national football team) István Pisont
- (Hungary national football team) József Sebők
- (Hungary national football team) Thomas Sowunmi
- (Liechtenstein national football team) Mario Frick
- (Liechtenstein national football team) Martin Telser
- (Portugal national football team) Capucho
- (Portugal national football team) Sérgio Conceição
- (Romania national football team) Liviu Ciobotariu
- (Romania national football team) Cătălin Munteanu
- (Romania national football team) Florentin Petre
- (Romania national football team) Gheorghe Popescu
- (Romania national football team) Ion Vlădoiu
- (Slovakia national football team) Miroslav Karhan
- (Slovakia national football team) Ľubomír Moravčík
- (Slovakia national football team) Szilárd Németh
- (Slovakia national football team) Miroslav Sovič

1 own goal

- (Liechtenstein national football team) Modestus Haas (against Romania)
