= Szilárd Németh (footballer) =

Slovak footballer

Personal information
- Date of birth: 8 August 1977 (age 49)
- Place of birth: Komárno, Czechoslovakia
- Height: 1.78 m (5 ft 10 in)
- Position: Striker

Youth career
- 1984–1992: KFC Komárno
- 1992–1994: Slovan Bratislava

Senior career*
Years	Team	Apps	(Gls)
1994–1997	Slovan Bratislava	61	(25)
1997	1. FC Košice		
1997–1998	Sparta Prague	8	(0)
1998–1999	1. FC Košice	37	(20)
1999–2001	Inter Bratislava	58	(40)
2001–2006	Middlesbrough	117	(23)
2006	Strasbourg	9	(0)
2006–2010	Alemannia Aachen	77	(17)
Total		357	(130)

International career
1996–2006	Slovakia	58	(22)

Managerial career
- 2014–2020: Slovan Bratislava (juniors)
- 2020–2021: Komárno
- 2021–2022: Rohožník
- * Club domestic league appearances and goals

Szilárd Németh (Slovak pronunciation: [ˈsilaːrt ˈneːmet]; Hungarian: [ˈsilaːrd ˈneːmɛt]; born 8 August 1977), also known mononymously as Szilárd, is a Slovak former professional footballer who played as a striker.

After playing for clubs in Slovakia and the Czech Republic, he spent four and a half seasons at Middlesbrough of the Premier League from 2001 to 2006. After a brief stint at France's RC Strasbourg, he played for Alemannia Aachen in Germany until his retirement in 2010.

Németh was at that time the highest scorer in the history of the Slovakia national team, with 22 goals in 58 matches from 1997 to 2006.

== Club career ==
=== Early career ===
Németh started his career with Slovan Bratislava before moving to eastern Slovakia to join 1. FC Košice. After making an impact at both clubs, in 1998 Németh moved to giants of the region, Czech team Sparta Prague for record fee of 35 million CZK (€1.3 million). He subsequently returned to Slovakia, signing for Inter Bratislava. He won consecutive Slovak First Football League titles in 1999–2000 and 2000–01, finishing as the league's top scorer on both occasions.

=== Middlesbrough ===
Amid rumoured interest from Inter Milan, he eventually signed for English side Middlesbrough on 12 April 2001 for £2.1 million on a five-year contract. Earlier that season, he had a trial at their local rivals Sunderland.

Németh scored 23 goals in 117 Premier League appearances for the club. He became known as the Lizard King of Teesside and Slovakian Express for scoring regularly off the bench. Németh was part of Middlesbrough's 2004 League Cup-winning team, despite not making the squad for the final. He also featured as they contested the UEFA Cup in the next two seasons. During his time in the Premier League, he scored in wins over Chelsea, Manchester United, Liverpool and Tottenham Hotspur.

The 2005–06 season saw Németh turn down numerous transfer offers, including UEFA Cup winners CSKA Moscow. He faced competition up-front that season from Yakubu, Mark Viduka, Jimmy Floyd Hasselbaink and Massimo Maccarone, leading to his exit in January.

=== Later career ===
On 25 January 2006, Németh was sold to French club RC Strasbourg for a 'nominal fee'. Their season ended with relegation from Ligue 1, and he was released.

On 28 August 2006, he agreed to join the German Bundesliga club Alemannia Aachen in a two-year deal. Németh spent most of his first season on the sidelines because of a pulmonary embolism. In May 2008, he signed a contract extension with Aachen until the end of the 2009–10 season. In the winter of 2010–11, he opted to retire from football due to health problems.

== International career ==
Németh scored 22 times in 58 matches for Slovakia between 1997 and 2006. His debut was a 4–0 friendly win against Belarus at the Štadión pod Zoborom in Nitra on 2 February 1997, replacing Róbert Semeník for the final 26 minutes. He scored his first goal on his third cap on 5 February 1997, in a 2–2 draw away against Costa Rica. Németh's last goal came in his 55th international on 1 March 2006, in an away friendly win over France. His last game was on 6 September 2006, in qualification for Euro 2008, a 3–0 home defeat to the Czech Republic. He was the country's highest-scorer until Róbert Vittek broke the record, and is their seventh most-capped player.

== Personal life ==
Németh belongs to the Hungarian minority in Slovakia.

== Career statistics ==
Scores and results list Slovakia's goal tally first, score column indicates score after each Németh goal.

List of international goals scored by Szilárd Németh
No.	Date	Venue	Opponent	Score	Result	Competition
1	5 February 1997	Estadio Nacional de Costa Rica, San José, Costa Rica	Costa Rica	1–1	2–2	Friendly
2	7 February 1998	Tsirion Stadium, Limassol, Cyprus	Iceland	1–0	2–1	1998 Cyprus International Football Tournament
3	8 September 1999	Mestský štadión, Dubnica, Slovakia	Liechtenstein	1–0	2–0	UEFA Euro 2000 qualifying
4	16 August 2000	Tehelné pole, Bratislava, Slovakia	Croatia	1–1	1–1	Friendly
5	7 October 2000	Stadionul Republican, Chişinău, Moldova	Moldova	1–0	1–0	2002 FIFA World Cup qualification
6	15 November 2000	Diagoras Stadium, Rhodes, Greece	Greece	1–0	2–0	Friendly
7	27 February 2001	Stade 5 Juillet 1962, Algiers, Algeria	Algeria	1–1	1–1	Friendly
8	28 March 2001	Štadión Antona Malatinského, Trnava, Slovakia	Azerbaijan	1–0	3–1	2002 FIFA World Cup qualification
9	28 March 2001	Štadión Antona Malatinského, Trnava, Slovakia	Azerbaijan	2–1	3–1	2002 FIFA World Cup qualification
10	5 September 2001	Štadión na Sihoti, Trenčín, Slovakia	Moldova	2–1	4–2	2002 FIFA World Cup qualification
11	21 August 2002	Andrův stadion, Olomouc, Czech Republic	Czech Republic	1–0	1–4	Friendly
12	12 October 2002	Tehelné pole, Bratislava, Slovakia	England	1–0	1–2	UEFA Euro 2004 qualifying
13	2 April 2003	Štadión Antona Malatinského, Trnava, Slovakia	Liechtenstein	2–0	4–0	UEFA Euro 2004 qualifying
14	2 April 2003	Štadión Antona Malatinského, Trnava, Slovakia	Liechtenstein	3–0	4–0	UEFA Euro 2004 qualifying
15	30 April 2003	Štadión pod Dubňom, Žilina, Slovakia	Greece	1–1	2–2	Friendly
16	30 April 2003	Štadión pod Dubňom, Žilina, Slovakia	Greece	2–2	2–2	Friendly
17	10 September 2003	Štadión pod Dubňom, Žilina, Slovakia	North Macedonia	1–0	1–1	UEFA Euro 2004 qualifying
18	8 September 2004	Tehelné pole, Bratislava, Slovakia	Liechtenstein	5–0	7–0	2006 FIFA World Cup qualification
19	9 October 2004	Tehelné pole, Bratislava, Slovakia	Latvia	1–1	4–1	2006 FIFA World Cup qualification
20	8 June 2005	Stade Josy Barthel, Luxembourg City, Luxembourg	Luxembourg	1–0	4–0	2006 FIFA World Cup qualification
21	12 November 2005	Vicente Calderón Stadium, Madrid, Spain	Spain	1–2	1–5	2006 FIFA World Cup European Qualification Playoffs
22	1 March 2006	Stade de France, Paris, France	France	1–0	2–1	Friendly

== Honours ==
Slovan Bratislava

- Slovak First Football League: 1994–95, 1995–96
- Slovak Cup: 1996–97

Inter Bratislava

- Slovak First Football Leaguea: 1999–2000, 2000–01
- Slovak Cup: 1999–2000, 2000–01

Middlesbrough

- Football League Cup: 2003–04

Individual

- Slovak Footballer of the Year: 2000
- Slovak First Football League top scorer: 1999–2000, 2000–01
