= UEFA Euro 1996 qualifying Group 1 =

Football tournament qualification stage

Qualifying Group 1 for the 1996 UEFA European Football Championship took place between 4 September 1994 and 15 November 1995 and consisted of France, Romania, Poland, Israel, Slovakia and Azerbaijan.

Following the dissolution of the Soviet Union and the dissolution of Czechoslovakia, the tournament marked the first competitive matches for Azerbaijan and Slovakia. It also marked the first appearance of Israel in qualifying for the UEFA European Championships after joining UEFA in 1994.

Both Romania and France qualified for UEFA Euro 1996 after recording wins in their final matches against Slovakia and Israel respectively, Romania as group winners and France as one of the six best runners-up.

== Background ==
Following the Revolutions of 1989, the Soviet Union was dissolved and ceased to exist on 26 December 1991 while the dissolution of Czechoslovakia was complete the following year. As a result, neither Azerbaijan nor Slovakia had played any competitive matches before.

After being expelled from the Asian Football Confederation (AFC) in 1974, Israel was stuck without continental affiliation. They were accepted as an associate member of UEFA in 1992 and became a full member in 1994, allowing the national team to compete in UEFA competitions.

UEFA Euro 1996 would be the first UEFA European Championship to feature 16 teams in the finals. Previous editions had only seen four or eight teams qualify.

Previously, France had qualified for the UEFA European Championships on three occasions and had won the competition once as hosts in 1984. Romania had qualified once before but Poland had not previously reached the finals.

== Format ==
The group was contested as a double round robin in which each team would play every other team twice – once at home and once away. The group winner would qualify for UEFA Euro 1996. Of the eight groups, the six best runners-up would also qualify. The remaining two runners-up would contest a play-off to determine the final qualifier.

== Summary ==
The group began with a 2–1 win for Israel against Poland on 4 September 1994. Three days later, Romania defeated Azerbaijan and France drew goalless with Slovakia. The following month, France drew goalless with Romania, Israel drew 2–2 with Slovakia and Poland defeated Azerbaijan 1–0. In November 1994, Romania and Israel recorded wins over Slovakia and Azerbaijan respectively and France drew goalless with Poland. France recorded their first win of the competition against Azerbaijan the following month and, in the last match of 1994, Israel drew with Romania. That left Romania and Israel top of the standings with eight points, two ahead of France.

In March 1995, France and Israel drew goalless and Romania and Slovakia recorded wins over Poland and Azerbaijan. The following month, Poland edged out Israel 4–3 before Romania and France recorded wins over Azerbaijan and Slovakia respectively. In June, Poland defeated Slovakia 5–0 and Romania won 2–1 against Israel. Two months later, Slovakia defeated Azerbaijan and France drew with Poland. With three rounds of matches still to play, Romania sat top of the standings with 17 points, six ahead of France and Poland.

France recorded a 10–0 win against Azerbaijan in September 1995. Poland drew goalless with Romania and Slovakia defeated Israel. The following month, Israel defeated Azerbaijan, Slovakia defeated Poland and France defeated Romania. In their final matches, Romania and France qualified for UEFA Euro 1996 after recording wins against Slovakia and Israel respectively. Azerbaijan and Poland drew goalless.

== Standings ==
Pos	Team	Pld	W	D	L	GF	GA	GD	Pts	Qualification	(Romania)	(France)	(Slovakia)	(Poland)	(Israel)	(Azerbaijan)
1	Romania	10	6	3	1	18	9	+9	21	Qualify for final tournament	—	1–3	3–2	2–1	2–1	3–0
2	France	10	5	5	0	22	2	+20	20	Qualify for final tournament	0–0	—	4–0	1–1	2–0	10–0
3	Slovakia	10	4	2	4	14	18	−4	14		0–2	0–0	—	4–1	1–0	4–1
4	Poland	10	3	4	3	14	12	+2	13		0–0	0–0	5–0	—	4–3	1–0
5	Israel	10	3	3	4	13	13	0	12		1–1	0–0	2–2	2–1	—	2–0
6	Azerbaijan	10	0	1	9	2	29	−27	1		1–4	0–2	0–1	0–0	0–2	—

Rules for classification: Qualification tiebreakers

== Results ==
4 September 1994
17:00 UTC+2

Israel	2–1	Poland
R. Harazi 43', 58'		Kosecki 80'

Ramat Gan Stadium, Ramat Gan
Attendance: 4,000
Referee: Frans van den Wijngaert (Belgium)

7 September 1994
20:30 UTC+2

Slovakia	0–0	France

Tehelné pole, Bratislava
Attendance: 14,329
Referee: Peter Mikkelsen (Denmark)
7 September 1994
20:00 UTC+3

Romania	3–0	Azerbaijan
Belodedici 44'; Petrescu 59'; Răducioiu 88'

Stadionul Steaua, Bucharest
Attendance: 7,000
Referee: Robert Sedlacek (Austria)

8 October 1994
20:45 UTC+1

France	0–0	Romania

Stade Geoffroy-Guichard, Saint-Étienne
Attendance: 31,144
Referee: Leif Sundell (Sweden)

12 October 1994
18:00 UTC+2

Israel	2–2	Slovakia
R. Harazi 23'; Banin 32' (pen.)		Rusnák 5'; Moravčík 14'

Ramat Gan Stadium, Ramat Gan
Attendance: 9,000
Referee: John Blankenstein (Netherlands)
12 October 1994
20:15 UTC+1

Poland	1–0	Azerbaijan
Juskowiak 44'

Stadion Stali Mielec, Mielec
Attendance: 11,000
Referee: Ilkka Koho (Finland)

12 November 1994
18:00 UTC+2

Romania	3–2	Slovakia
Gh. Popescu 76'; Hagi 47'; Prodan 81'		Dubovský 56'; Chvíla 78'

Stadionul Steaua, Bucharest
Attendance: 10,283
Referee: Vadim Zhuk (Belarus)

16 November 1994
18:00 UTC+1

Poland	0–0	France

Górnik Zabrze Stadium, Zabrze
Attendance: 18,000
Referee: Angelo Amendolia (Italy)
16 November 1994
19:00 UTC+2

Azerbaijan	0–2	Israel
		R. Harazi 29'; Rosenthal 51'

Hüseyin Avni Aker Stadium, Trabzon, Turkey
Attendance: 2,863
Referee: László Vágner (Hungary)

13 December 1994
19:00 UTC+2

Azerbaijan	0–2	France
		Papin 24'; Loko 55'

Hüseyin Avni Aker Stadium, Trabzon, Turkey
Attendance: 533
Referee: Rune Pedersen (Norway)

14 December 1994
18:00 UTC+2

Israel	1–1	Romania
Rosenthal 83'		Lăcătuș 69'

Ramat Gan Stadium, Ramat Gan
Attendance: 38,000
Referee: Antonio Martín Navarrete (Spain)

29 March 1995
18:30 UTC+3

Romania	2–1	Poland
Răducioiu 45'; Wandzik 54' (o.g.)		Juskowiak 41' (pen.)

Stadionul Steaua, Bucharest
Attendance: 13,480
Referee: Kurt Röthlisberger (Switzerland)
29 March 1995
18:00 UTC+2

Slovakia	4–1	Azerbaijan
Tittel 33'; Timko 39', 50'; Dubovský 45' (pen.)		Suleymanov 79' (pen.)

Všešportový areál, Košice
Attendance: 12,450
Referee: Vassilios Nikakis (Greece)
29 March 1995
17:00 UTC+2

Israel	0–0	France

Ramat Gan Stadium, Ramat Gan
Attendance: 39,000
Referee: Jim McCluskey (Scotland)

25 April 1995
17:30 UTC+2

Poland	4–3	Israel
Nowak 1'; Juskowiak 50'; Kowalczyk 55'; Kosecki 62'		Rosenthal 37'; Revivo 43'; Zohar 79'

Górnik Zabrze Stadium, Zabrze
Attendance: 5,500
Referee: Anders Frisk (Sweden)

26 April 1995
18:00 UTC+3

Azerbaijan	1–4	Romania
Suleymanov 33'		Răducioiu 1' (pen.), 74', 77'; Dumitrescu 39'

Hüseyin Avni Aker Stadium, Trabzon, Turkey
Attendance: 372
Referee: Dimitar Momirov (Bulgaria)
26 April 1995
20:45 UTC+2

France	4–0	Slovakia
Krištofík 27' (o.g.); Ginola 42'; Blanc 58'; Guérin 63'

Stade de la Beaujoire, Nantes
Attendance: 23,910
Referee: Bernd Heynemann (Germany)

7 June 1995
17:30 UTC+2

Poland	5–0	Slovakia
Juskowiak 10', 72'; Wieszczycki 58'; Kosecki 64'; Nowak 68'

Górnik Zabrze Stadium, Zabrze
Attendance: 9,515
Referee: Robert Sedlacek (Austria)
7 June 1995
20:00 UTC+3

Romania	2–1	Israel
Lăcătuș 15'; Munteanu 65'		Berkovic 60'

Stadionul Steaua, Bucharest
Attendance: 18,575
Referee: Rune Pedersen (Norway)

16 August 1995
19:00 UTC+3

Azerbaijan	0–1	Slovakia
		Jančula 59'

Hüseyin Avni Aker Stadium, Trabzon, Turkey
Attendance: 200
Referee: Alain Hamer (Luxembourg)
16 August 1995
20:45 UTC+2

France	1–1	Poland
Djorkaeff 86'		Juskowiak 34'

Parc des Princes, Paris
Attendance: 40,426
Referee: Manuel Díaz Vega (Spain)

6 September 1995
20:45 UTC+2

France	10–0	Azerbaijan
Desailly 13'; Djorkaeff 17', 77'; Guérin 32'; Pedros 48'; Leboeuf 53', 74'; Dugarry 66'; Zidane 71'; Cocard 90'

Stade de l'Abbé-Deschamps, Auxerre
Attendance: 13,479
Referee: Alfred Micallef (Malta)
6 September 1995
17:00 UTC+2

Poland	0–0	Romania

Górnik Zabrze Stadium, Zabrze
Attendance: 18,000
Referee: Dermot Gallagher (England)
6 September 1995
18:00 UTC+2

Slovakia	1–0	Israel
Jančula 54'

Všešportový areál, Košice
Attendance: 7,810
Referee: Michel Piraux (Belgium)

11 October 1995
19:00 UTC+2

Romania	1–3	France
Lăcătuș 51'		Karembeu 29'; Djorkaeff 41'; Zidane 72'

Stadionul Steaua, Bucharest
Attendance: 23,200
Referee: Pierluigi Pairetto (Italy)
11 October 1995
17:30 UTC+1

Slovakia	4–1	Poland
Dubovský 31' (pen.); Jančula 68'; Ujlaky 78'; Šimon 82'		Juskowiak 18'

Tehelné pole, Bratislava
Attendance: 11,653
Referee: Jorge Monteiro Coroado (Portugal)
11 October 1995
18:00 UTC+2

Israel	2–0	Azerbaijan
R. Harazi 31', 51'

Bloomfield Stadium, Tel Aviv
Attendance: 7,000
Referee: Claude Détruche (Switzerland)

15 November 1995
20:45 UTC+1

France	2–0	Israel
Djorkaeff 69'; Lizarazu 89'

Stade Michel d'Ornano, Caen
Attendance: 20,822
Referee: Gerd Grabher (Austria)
15 November 1995
17:30 UTC+1

Slovakia	0–2	Romania
		Hagi 67'; Munteanu 80'

Všešportový areál, Košice
Attendance: 9,676
Referee: Jaap Uilenberg (Netherlands)
15 November 1995
16:00 UTC+2

Azerbaijan	0–0	Poland

Hüseyin Avni Aker Stadium, Trabzon, Turkey
Attendance: 200
Referee: Leslie Mottram (Scotland)

== Goalscorers ==
There were 83 goals scored in 30 matches, for an average of 2.77 goals per match.

7 goals

- (Poland national football team) Andrzej Juskowiak

6 goals

- (Israel national football team) Ronen Harazi

5 goals

- (France national football team) Youri Djorkaeff
- (Romania national football team) Florin Răducioiu

3 goals

- (Israel national football team) Ronny Rosenthal
- (Poland national football team) Roman Kosecki
- (Romania national football team) Marius Lăcătuș
- (Slovakia national football team) Peter Dubovský
- (Slovakia national football team) Tibor Jančula

2 goals

- (Azerbaijan national football team) Nazim Suleymanov
- (France national football team) Vincent Guérin
- (France national football team) Frank Leboeuf
- (France national football team) Zinedine Zidane
- (Poland national football team) Piotr Nowak
- (Romania national football team) Gheorghe Hagi
- (Romania national football team) Dorinel Munteanu
- (Slovakia national football team) Jaroslav Timko

1 goal

- (France national football team) Laurent Blanc
- (France national football team) Christophe Cocard
- (France national football team) Marcel Desailly
- (France national football team) Christophe Dugarry
- (France national football team) David Ginola
- (France national football team) Christian Karembeu
- (France national football team) Bixente Lizarazu
- (France national football team) Patrice Loko
- (France national football team) Jean-Pierre Papin
- (France national football team) Reynald Pedros
- (Israel national football team) Tal Banin
- (Israel national football team) Eyal Berkovic
- (Israel national football team) Haim Revivo
- (Israel national football team) Itzik Zohar
- (Poland national football team) Wojciech Kowalczyk
- (Poland national football team) Tomasz Wieszczycki
- (Romania national football team) Miodrag Belodedici
- (Romania national football team) Ilie Dumitrescu
- (Romania national football team) Dan Petrescu
- (Romania national football team) Gheorghe Popescu
- (Romania national football team) Daniel Prodan
- (Slovakia national football team) Miroslav Chvíla
- (Slovakia national football team) Ľubomír Moravčík
- (Slovakia national football team) Štefan Rusnák
- (Slovakia national football team) Július Šimon
- (Slovakia national football team) Dušan Tittel
- (Slovakia national football team) Marek Ujlaky

1 own goal

- (Poland national football team) Józef Wandzik (against Romania)
- (Slovakia national football team) Ondrej Krištofík (against France)
