= Róbert Vittek =

Slovak footballer (born 1982)

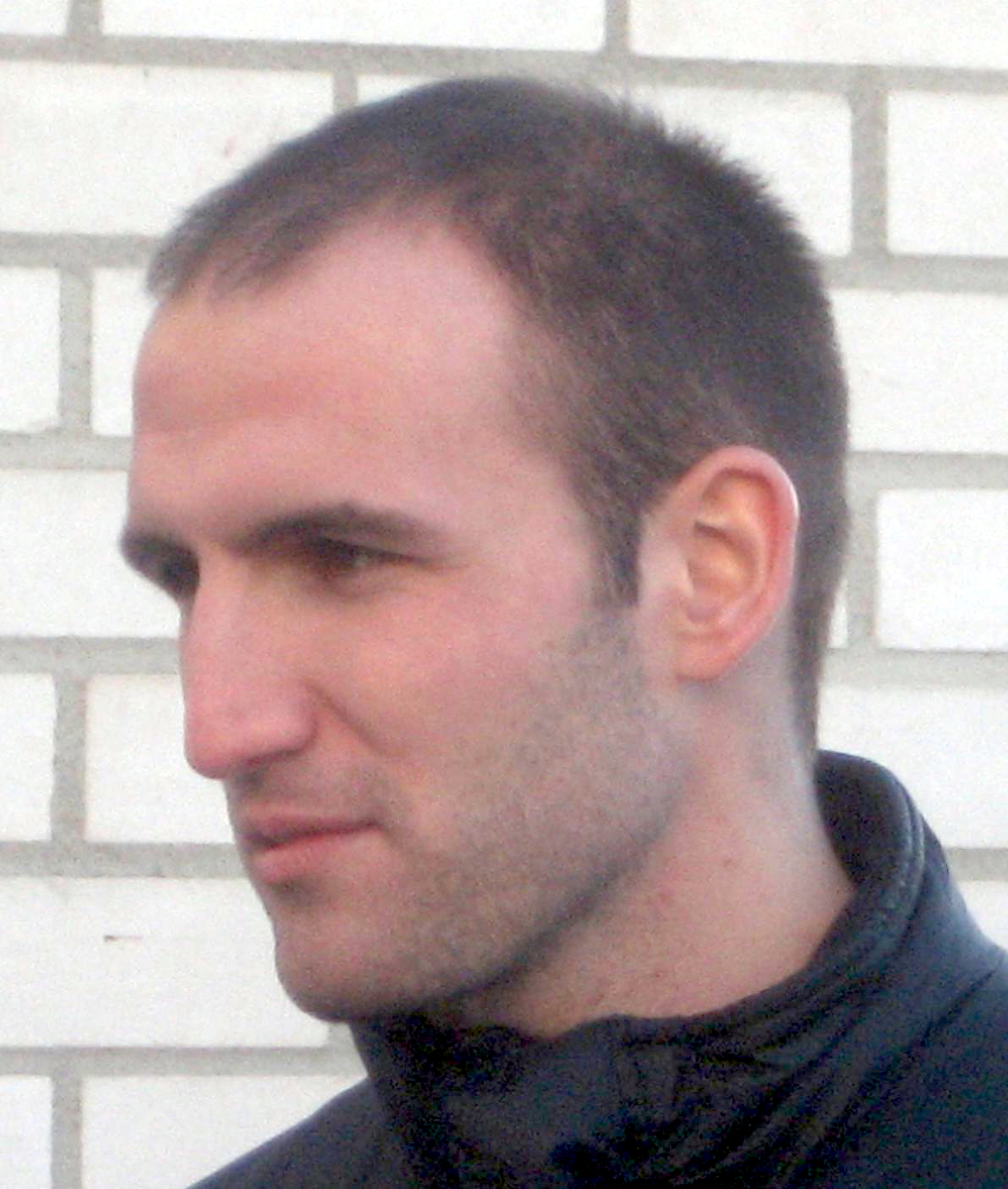
- Vittek in 2008

Personal information
- Date of birth: 1 April 1982 (age 44)
- Place of birth: Bratislava, Czechoslovakia
- Height: 1.87 m (6 ft 2 in)
- Position: Forward

Youth career
- Slovan Bratislava

Senior career*
Years	Team	Apps	(Gls)
1999–2003	Slovan Bratislava	101	(47)
2003–2008	1. FC Nürnberg	124	(36)
2008–2010	Lille	38	(7)
2010	→ Ankaragücü (loan)	12	(5)
2010–2011	Ankaragücü	12	(1)
2011–2013	Trabzonspor	6	(2)
2013	İstanbul BB	0	(0)
2013–2016	Slovan Bratislava	47	(22)
2016	Debrecen	8	(2)
2017–2018	Slovan Bratislava	31	(2)
2019	Slovan Bratislava	1	(0)
Total		380	(124)

International career
2001–2016	Slovakia	82	(23)
- * Club domestic league appearances and goals

Róbert Vittek (Slovak pronunciation: [ˈrɔːbert ˈʋitek]; born 1 April 1982) is a Slovak former professional footballer who played as a forward.

With 23 goals in 82 matches since 2001, Vittek is the second top scorer in the history of the Slovakia national football team. He played for Slovakia at the 2010 FIFA World Cup, scoring four goals.

== Club career ==
=== Slovan Bratislava ===
Vittek began his career in the youth team of hometown club Slovan Bratislava in 1999. He was then promoted to the first team for the 1999–2000 campaign. While still a youth player, he signed a preliminary agreement with Real Madrid, but the move to Spain fell through due to injury. He was 19 at the time and scored 19 goals for Slovan. The next season, he played only three games, scoring twice. Before moving to Germany, Vittek had a trial at Birmingham City and impressed the club enough that they made a move for him. However, the move never materialized.

=== 1. FC Nürnberg ===
Vittek came to Nürnberg in 2003 when the club was still in the 2. Bundesliga, helping the team earn promotion to the Bundesliga for the 2004–05 campaign. During the first half of the 2004–05 season, he signed a long-term contract.

Vittek scored only five goals in the 2004–05 campaign, and the following year he failed to score in the first 17 matches before the winter break. However, with the arrival of new coach Hans Meyer, he scored 16 goals in the final 16 games of the 2005–06 season. He made league history in Spieltag 24 and 25, becoming the first Bundesliga player to score a combined six goals in two consecutive games. In all, Vittek had five multi-goal games on the season, and his 16 goals were good for fifth place on the Bundesliga scoring charts. Vittek's rise was mirrored by his team as 1. FC Nürnberg rose from near-relegation to eighth place. He established a new record by scoring six goals in a row without an intervening goal from another player in the last two games against MSV Duisburg and 1. FC Köln respectively. In the next game, he scored two more goals against Werder Bremen, and just missed the league record of Lothar Emmerich and Tomislav Marić with four braces. His 2005–06 performance made Vittek a sought-after player in European football. Hamburger SV was the main Bundesliga club rumored to be courting Vittek. Dynamo Kyiv offered a €10 million transfer fee for Vittek in June 2006, but Nürnberg rejected the offer. Lokomotiv Moscow was also reported to have interest in Vittek's services.

The 2006–07 season was mixed for Vittek again as he just scored four goals in 24 games due to Markus Schroth and Ivan Saenko making the score sheet. He played only three game of the cup until the quarter finals of the DFB-Pokal and returned only in the final, but stayed only on the bench which on 26 May 2007, Nürnberg won the DFB-Pokal beating VfB Stuttgart 3–1. During the season in October, Vittek signed a contract extension, keeping him until 2010 and this season began the decline for Vittek at Nürnberg. In December 2006, Vittek won the Slovak Footballer of the Year award.

The 2007–08 season was a negative season for Vittek as he scored once in 17 games due to injury and lack of fitness. On 24 July 2007, Vittek scored two goals for Nürnberg in the DFB-Ligapokal, but his team lost 4–2 to Schalke 04. On 5 August 2007, Vittek scored his first hat-trick since two seasons ago in the first round of DFB-Pokal in a 6–0 thrashing against Victoria Hamburg. On 1 September 2007, Vittek received a red card for the first time in his Bundesliga career after a second bookable offense in a 1–1 draw against Energie Cottbus. Despite his sending off, a few days later, Vittek was injured after suffering pain on his knee, resulting in him being out of action throughout the rest of 2007 and was expected not to be available until January despite the operation being a success. After the injury time, his return was delayed due to the flu. The long forced break was also responsible for the fact that he was never used in the 2007–08 UEFA Cup. On 1 March 2008, Vittek began to make his first appearance for the club since his injury, coming on as a substitute in a 2–1 loss against Hannover 96. On 5 April, Vittek scored his first goal (and only goal) of the season in a 3–1 win over Eintracht Frankfurt.

The 2008–09 season was short-lived for Vittek before his move to Lille as he made two appearances and in his last match with a 2–1 loss against 1. FC Kaiserslautern provided an assist for Isaac Boakye to score the only goal in the game.

=== Lille ===
Struggling to get to previous form, he went to play to French club Lille for a reported €5.5 million in 2008, where he was awarded a contract until 2012. On 31 August 2008, Vittek made his debut for the club in a 2–1 win over Bordeaux and scored his first goal in a 3–0 win over Saint-Étienne three months later since making his debut. He went on to help the club finally with a total of five goals in 26 games for the fifth place, and thus to qualify for the UEFA Europa League.

On 30 July 2009, he first played in the qualifying round of the 2009–10 UEFA Champions League against FK Sevojno and scored a goal. In the league start on 9 August he was in the starting lineup in a 2–1 loss against Lorient and two weeks later on 23 August 2009, Vittek scored his first goal in a 1–1 draw against Toulouse. After 17 games without scoring, Vittek scored in a 2–1 loss against Sochaux.

=== M.K.E. Ankaragücü ===
On 1 February 2010, Vittek left Lille and signed a half year loan deal with MKE Ankaragücü. On 7 February 2010, he debuted in a 0–0 draw against Bursaspor and scored his first goal in the next game with a 1–1 draw against İstanbul BB. Vittek scored a brace in a 3–0 win over Kayserispor on 21 March 2010.

After the World Cup campaign, Ankaragücü bought him from Lille permanently despite interest from his former club Nürnberg. Since signing permanently for Ankaragücü, Vittek has never produced his form like last time when he was on loan, as he just made 12 appearances and scored once against Bucaspor in a 5–3 win and also set up a goal for Murat Duruer on 21 April 2010.

In the 2010–11 winter transfer window FC Red Bull Salzburg were interested in signing Vittek. After the transfer arrangements with MKE Ankaragücü were cleared, the club officials of the Turkish side claimed to have sent a confirmation fax on 31 January 2011, shortly before midnight to Salzburg. The fax was received in Salzburg one minute past midnight and the clock of the Transfer Matching System (TMS) of FIFA registered it at 00:03 and therefore invalid. Ankaragücü made a faulty fax machine responsible for the incident. On 23 February, it was ruled by the FIFA that Vittek was not joining the reigning Austrian champion.

=== Trabzonspor ===
On 1 September 2011, Vittek signed a two-year contract for Turkish club Trabzonspor for a reported fee of €600,000.

On 14 September 2011, Vittek made his Champions League debut, coming on as a substitute in a 1–0 win over Inter Milan. On 17 September 2011, he made his debut for the club but soon in the game, he suffered an injury on a tear in the anterior cruciate ligament of the right knee to which sidelined him for about six months. In April 2012, Vittek was again training with the squad and planned to return at the very end of the season. By August, Vittek made his first appearance for the club since suffering an injury in a 1–1 draw against Kardemir Karabükspor.

=== İstanbul BB ===
In February 2013, he signed a one-and-a-half-year contract with İstanbul BB. He did not make any league appearances for the club due to injuries.

=== Return to Slovan Bratislava ===
On 3 September 2013, Vittek signed for his hometown club ŠK Slovan Bratislava and was assigned the number 33 shirt. He officially debuted on 14 September, scoring a goal in the 4–2 victory over FK Dukla Banská Bystrica in an away league match. In the 2013–14 season, Slovan won the league title with Vittek scoring 12 league goals. However, he has been troubled with injuries in recent years, missing the last five games of the 2013–14 season as well as 2014–15.

On 23 July 2015, Vittek netted a hat-trick in an away 5–1 victory to University College Dublin as Slovan advanced 6–1 on aggregate into the third qualifying round of the UEFA Europa League. He repeated the feat in the next round's second leg, a 3–3 home draw against FC Krasnodar which saw his team eliminated nonetheless.

On 6 July 2016, it was announced that Vittek would not play for Slovan Bratislava after he was offered the manager's job at the end of his player contract.

=== Debrecen ===
On 5 October 2016, Vittek joined Hungarian first division side Debreceni VSC for the remainder of the 2016–17 season.

== International career ==
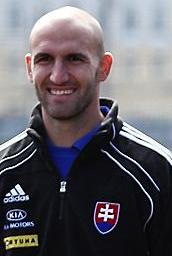
Vittek in the jersey of the Slovakia national team in 2010.

Vittek became part of Slovak national team in 2001. His tally of 81 caps makes him their third most-capped player after Miroslav Karhan and Marek Hamšík. Vittek scored Slovakia's first ever goal at a World Cup, netting in the 1–1 draw with New Zealand on 15 June 2010. Vittek also scored two goals against defending World Cup holders Italy on 24 June 2010 to knock them out of the competition, leading Slovakia to progress to the 2010 FIFA World Cup knockout stage. On 28 June 2010, Slovakia lost 2–1 to the Netherlands in their first knockout stage match, in which Vittek converted a last-minute penalty to become Slovakia's top international scorer. With four goals in the competition, he also became the joint top scorer at the stage that Slovakia were knocked out. He scored only one goal fewer than Germany's Thomas Müller, who won the Golden Boot.

Following the 2010 World Cup, Vittek was not a regular on the team in the Euro 2012 qualifiers, playing in only three matches as Slovakia failed to qualify for UEFA Euro 2012 by ending fourth in their group. Vittek also did not feature in Slovakia's 2014 World Cup qualifiers. After a period of national wilderness of almost two years, Vittek was chosen in the squad for Slovakia's Euro 2016 qualifiers against Spain and Ukraine. He was an unused substitute in the 2–0 defeat to Spain but started in the 0–0 draw against Ukraine.

== Personal life ==
Vittek is married to Slovak businesswoman Patrícia Vittek, whom he met during his playing career for Hamburger SV.

== Career statistics ==
Appearances and goals by national team and year
National team	Year	Apps	Goals
Slovakia	2001	6	1
Slovakia	2002	5	0
Slovakia	2003	8	5
Slovakia	2004	8	5
Slovakia	2005	10	2
Slovakia	2006	6	1
Slovakia	2007	5	1
Slovakia	2008	9	1
Slovakia	2009	11	2
Slovakia	2010	7	5
Slovakia	2011	4	0
Slovakia	2013	1	0
Slovakia	2015	1	0
Slovakia	2016	1	0
Total		82	23

Scores and results list Slovakia's goal tally first, score column indicates score after each Vittek goal.

List of international goals scored by Róbert Vittek
No.	Date	Venue	Opponent	Score	Result	Competition
1	15 August 2001	Tehelné pole, Bratislava, Slovakia	Iran	3–2	3–4	Friendly
2	12 February 2003	Larnaca, Cyprus	Romania	1–0	1–2	Cyprus 2003 Cyprus International Football Tournament
3	13 February 2003	Larnaca, Cyprus	Cyprus	2–1	3–1	2003 Cyprus International Football Tournament
4	13 February 2003	Larnaca, Cyprus	Cyprus	3–1	3–1	2003 Cyprus International Football Tournament
5	11 October 2003	Rheinpark Stadion, Vaduz, Liechtenstein	Liechtenstein	1–0	2–0	UEFA Euro 2004 qualifying
6	11 October 2003	Rheinpark Stadion, Vaduz, Liechtenstein	Liechtenstein	2–0	2–0	UEFA Euro 2004 qualifying
7	18 August 2004	Tehelné pole, Bratislava, Slovakia	Luxembourg	1–1	3–1	2006 FIFA World Cup qualification
8	4 September 2004	Dynamo Stadium, Moscow, Russia	Russia	1–1	1–1	2006 FIFA World Cup qualification
9	8 September 2004	Tehelné pole, Bratislava, Slovakia	Liechtenstein	1–0	7–0	2006 FIFA World Cup qualification
10	8 September 2004	Tehelné pole, Bratislava, Slovakia	Liechtenstein	3–0	7–0	2006 FIFA World Cup qualification
11	8 September 2004	Tehelné pole, Bratislava, Slovakia	Liechtenstein	4–0	7–0	2006 FIFA World Cup qualification
12	9 February 2005	GSZ Stadium, Larnaca, Cyprus	Romania	1–0	2–2	2005 Cyprus International Football Tournament
13	7 September 2005	Skonto Stadium, Riga, Latvia	Latvia	1–0	1–1	2006 FIFA World Cup qualification
14	7 October 2006	Millennium Stadium, Cardiff, United Kingdom	Wales	5–1	5–1	UEFA Euro 2008 qualifying
15	24 March 2007	GSP Stadium, Nicosia, Cyprus	Cyprus	1–1	3–1	UEFA Euro 2008 qualifying
16	19 November 2008	Štadión pod Dubňom, Žilina, Slovakia	Liechtenstein	3–0	4–0	Friendly
17	10 February 2009	Tsirion Stadium, Limassol, Cyprus	Ukraine	1–1	2–3	2009 Cyprus International Football Tournament
18	12 August 2009	Laugardalsvöllur, Reykjavík, Iceland	Iceland	1–0	1–1	Friendly
19	5 June 2010	Štadión Pasienky, Bratislava, Slovakia	Costa Rica	2–0	3–0	Friendly
20	15 June 2010	Royal Bafokeng Stadium, Rustenburg, South Africa	New Zealand	1–0	1–1	2010 FIFA World Cup
21	24 June 2010	Ellis Park Stadium, Johannesburg, South Africa	Italy	1–0	3–2	2010 FIFA World Cup
22	24 June 2010	Ellis Park Stadium, Johannesburg, South Africa	Italy	2–0	3–2	2010 FIFA World Cup
23	28 June 2010	Moses Mabhida Stadium, Durban, South Africa	Netherlands	1–2	1–2	2010 FIFA World Cup

== Honours ==
1. FC Nürnberg

- 2. Bundesliga: 2003–04 (promoted)
- DFB-Pokal: 2006–07

Slovan Bratislava

- Slovak Super Liga: 2013–14, 2018–19

Individual

- Slovak Footballer of the Year: 2006
