= Miroslav Karhan =

Slovak footballer (born 1976)

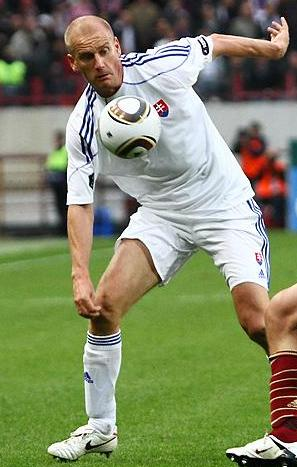

Personal information
- Date of birth: 21 June 1976 (age 50)
- Place of birth: Hlohovec, Czechoslovakia
- Height: 1.89 m (6 ft 2 in)
- Position: Midfielder

Team information
- Current team: Slovan Hlohovec (manager)

Youth career
- 1986–1993: Spartak Trnava

Senior career*
Years	Team	Apps	(Gls)
1993–1999	Spartak Trnava	152	(21)
1999–2000	Betis	33	(2)
2000–2001	Beşiktaş	26	(2)
2001–2007	VfL Wolfsburg	173	(9)
2007–2011	Mainz 05	109	(10)
2011–2013	Spartak Trnava	64	(6)
2013–2014	Komárno	22	(1)
2014–2016	Dynamo Malženice	57	(6)
2019	Báhoň	16	(1)
Total		652	(52)

International career
1995–2011	Slovakia	107	(14)

Managerial career
- 2016–2017: Spartak Trnava
- 2019: Báhoň
- 2020: Komárno
- 2022–2024: Nové Mesto nad Váhom
- 2024–2025: Blava Jaslovské Bohunice
- 2025–: Slovan Hlohovec
- * Club domestic league appearances and goals

Miroslav Karhan (born 21 June 1976) is a Slovak football manager and former player who played as a midfielder.

Karhan started and finished his career at Spartak Trnava; in between, he played in Spain, Turkey and Germany, where he spent ten seasons. Karhan was a regular member of the Slovakia national team and with 107 appearances, played the fourth most matches of any player to represent them.

== Club career ==
Karhan began his career with local club Spartak Trnava. In 1999, he signed a four-year contract with La Liga club Real Betis, becoming the third Slovak player to join a Spanish league club in the 1990s after Peter Dubovský and Samuel Slovák. In 2002, he was named Slovak Footballer of the Year. Karhan joined Mainz 05 of the 2. Bundesliga on a free transfer from Wolfsburg in July 2007, signing a two-year contract.

Having spent four seasons with Mainz 05, Karhan returned to Spartak Trnava in June 2011 before serving as club captain for two more seasons. In August 2013, Karhan announced his retirement from professional football and that he moved to a role of sports director of Spartak Trnava.

== International career ==
Karhan made 107 appearances for Slovakia, being the most-capped Slovak footballer of all time, until his record was surpassed by Marek Hamšík in October 2018. He captained the national team.

== Personal life ==
Karhan is the father of two boys: Patrick, who currently plays for Spartak Trnava and represented Slovakia at youth international level, and Alex Thomas.

== Career statistics ==
=== International ===
Appearances and goals by national team and year
National team	Year	Apps	Goals
Slovakia	1995	3	0
Slovakia	1996	6	0
Slovakia	1997	9	0
Slovakia	1998	5	0
Slovakia	1999	9	1
Slovakia	2000	6	0
Slovakia	2001	11	0
Slovakia	2002	5	1
Slovakia	2003	5	0
Slovakia	2004	8	3
Slovakia	2005	10	4
Slovakia	2006	7	3
Slovakia	2008	4	1
Slovakia	2009	7	0
Slovakia	2010	6	0
Slovakia	2011	6	1
Total		107	14

Scores and results list Slovakia's goal tally first, score column indicates score after each Karhan goal.

List of international goals scored by Miroslav Karhan
No.	Date	Venue	Opponent	Score	Result	Competition
1	8 September 1999	Mestský štadión, Dubnica, Slovakia	Liechtenstein	2–0	2–0	UEFA Euro 2000 qualifying
2	20 November 2002	Štadión Antona Malatinského, Trnava, Slovakia	Ukraine	1–0	1–1	Friendly
3	8 September 2004	Tehelné pole, Bratislava, Slovakia	Liechtenstein	3–0	7–0	2006 FIFA World Cup qualification
4	9 October 2004	Tehelné pole, Bratislava, Slovakia	Latvia	3–1	4–1	2006 FIFA World Cup qualification
5	9 October 2004	Tehelné pole, Bratislava, Slovakia	Latvia	4–1	4–1	2006 FIFA World Cup qualification
6	9 February 2005	GSZ Stadium, Larnaca, Cyprus	Romania	2–1	2–2	Friendly
7	30 March 2005	Tehelné pole, Bratislava, Slovakia	Portugal	1–0	1–1	2006 FIFA World Cup qualification
8	3 September 2005	Tehelné pole, Bratislava, Slovakia	Germany	1–0	2–0	Friendly
9	3 September 2005	Tehelné pole, Bratislava, Slovakia	Germany	2–0	2–0	Friendly
10	2 September 2006	Tehelné pole, Bratislava, Slovakia	Cyprus	5–0	6–1	UEFA Euro 2008 qualifying
11	7 October 2006	Millennium Stadium, Cardiff, Wales	Wales	4–1	5–1	UEFA Euro 2008 qualifying
12	15 November 2006	Štadión pod Dubňom, Žilina, Slovakia	Bulgaria	3–0	3–1	Friendly
13	11 October 2008	Stadio Olimpico, Serravalle, San Marino	San Marino	3–1	3–1	2010 FIFA World Cup qualification
14	4 June 2011	Pasienky, Bratislava, Slovakia	Andorra	1–0	1–0	UEFA Euro 2012 qualifying

== See also ==
- List of men's footballers with 100 or more international caps
