= Mestský štadión (Dubnica) =

Multi-use stadium in Dubnica nad Váhom, Slovakia

Mestský futbalový štadión
- Interactive map of Mestský futbalový štadión
- Location: Športovcov 655, Dubnica nad Váhom, Slovakia
- Coordinates: 48°57′49″N 18°9′48″E
- Owner: City of Dubnica nad Váhom
- Operator: MFK Dubnica
- Capacity: 5,450
- Surface: Grass
- Field size: 105 x 68 m

Construction
- Built: 1942
- Renovated: 1990s

Tenants
- MFK Dubnica; UEFA U-17 Championship (2013)

Website
- www.fkdubnica.sk

Mestský futbalový štadión is a multi-use stadium in Dubnica nad Váhom, Slovakia. It is currently used mostly for football matches and is the home ground of MFK Dubnica. The stadium holds 5,450 people. The intensity of the floodlighting is 1,400 lux.

In 2007, the stadium hosted a Euro 2008 qualification match for the Slovakia national football team against the San Marino national football team.

== History ==
The stadium was built in 1942 and used for football matches of MFK Dubnica sport club. Due to renovation work in 1990s the capacity was increased to 5,450.

In 2025, the stadium hosted a derby between Spartak Dubnica and first league club AS Trenčín in the 2025–26 Slovak Cup.

== International matches ==
Mestský štadión has hosted two competitive matches of the Slovakia national football team.

8 September 1999 UEFA Euro 2000 qualifying Group 7	Slovakia	2–0	Liechtenstein	Dubnica nad Váhom, Slovakia
16:00; Match 57	Szilárd Németh 4'; Miroslav Karhan 55'; Jozef Valachovič (yellow card) 16' (yellow-red card) 37'	Report		Stadium: Mestský štadión Attendance: 3,052; Referee: Andreas Georgiou (Cyprus)

13 October 2007 UEFA Euro 2008 qualifying Group D	Slovakia	7–0	San Marino	Dubnica nad Váhom, Slovakia
15:00	Marek Hamšík 24'; Stanislav Šesták 32', 57'; Marek Sapara 37'; Martin Škrtel 51'; Filip Hološko 54'; Ján Ďurica 76' (pen.)	Report		Stadium: Mestský štadión Attendance: 2,576; Referee: Luc Wilmes (Luxembourg)
