= Slovak Footballer of the Year Awards =

Award of a Slovak organization of sports journalists

The Slovak Footballer of the Year Awards are annual awards given to the best Slovak football players playing abroad or in the Fortuna Liga.

== Ján Popluhár Award ==
Slovak Footballer of the Year is an annual title awarded to the best Slovak football player of the year since 1993. Its predecessor, Czechoslovak Footballer of the Year award was first presented in 1965, as an award for the whole of Czechoslovakia.

Year	1st place, gold medalist(s)	Club	2nd place, silver medalist(s)	Club	3rd place, bronze medalist(s)	Club
1993	Peter Dubovský	(Slovakia) Slovan Bratislava (Spain) Real Madrid	Ľubomír Moravčík	(France) Saint-Étienne	Ľubomír Luhový	(Slovakia) Inter Bratislava
1994	Vladimír Kinder	(Slovakia) Slovan Bratislava	Dušan Tittel	(Slovakia) Slovan Bratislava	Peter Dubovský	(Spain) Real Madrid
1995	Dušan Tittel	(Slovakia) Slovan Bratislava	Ladislav Molnár	(Slovakia) Slovan Bratislava	Peter Dubovský	(Spain) Real Madrid (Spain) Real Oviedo
1996	Dušan Tittel	(Slovakia) Slovan Bratislava	Peter Dubovský	(Spain) Real Oviedo	Július Šimon	(Slovakia) Spartak Trnava
1997	Dušan Tittel	(Slovakia) Slovan Bratislava (Slovakia) Spartak Trnava	Jozef Majoroš	(Czech Republic) Petra Drnovice	Tibor Jančula	(Slovakia) Slovan Bratislava (Germany) Fortuna Düsseldorf
1998	Jozef Majoroš	(Czech Republic) Petra Drnovice (Slovakia) Slovan Bratislava	Miroslav König	(Slovakia) Slovan Bratislava	Dušan Tittel	(Slovakia) Spartak Trnava
1999	Vladimír Labant	(Czech Republic) Slavia Prague (Czech Republic) Sparta Prague	Ľubomír Moravčík	(Scotland) Celtic Glasgow	Miroslav Karhan	(Slovakia) Spartak Trnava (Spain) Real Betis
2000	Szilárd Németh	(Slovakia) Inter Bratislava	Stanislav Varga	(Slovakia) Slovan Bratislava (England) Sunderland	Vratislav Greško	(Germany) Bayer Leverkusen (Italy) Inter Milan
2001	Ľubomír Moravčík	(Scotland) Celtic	Vladimír Labant	(Czech Republic) Sparta Prague	Miroslav Karhan	(Turkey) Beşiktaş (Germany) VfL Wolfsburg
2002	Miroslav Karhan	(Germany) VfL Wolfsburg	Vladimír Janočko	Austria Wien	Szilárd Németh	(England) Middlesbrough
2003	Vladimír Janočko	Austria Wien	Szilárd Németh	(England) Middlesbrough	Marek Mintál	(Slovakia) Žilina (Germany) 1. FC Nürnberg
2004	Marek Mintál	(Germany) 1. FC Nürnberg	Róbert Vittek	(Germany) 1. FC Nürnberg	Miroslav Karhan	(Germany) VfL Wolfsburg
2005	Marek Mintál	(Germany) 1. FC Nürnberg	Kamil Čontofalský	(Russia) Zenit Saint Petersburg	Miroslav Karhan	(Germany) VfL Wolfsburg
2006	Róbert Vittek	(Germany) 1. FC Nürnberg	Martin Škrtel	(Russia) Zenit Saint Petersburg	Marek Sapara	(Slovakia) Ružomberok (Norway) Rosenborg
2007	Martin Škrtel	(Russia) Zenit Saint Petersburg	Marek Hamšík	(Italy) Brescia (Italy) Napoli	Marek Čech	(Portugal) Porto
2008	Martin Škrtel	(England) Liverpool	Marek Hamšík	(Italy) Napoli	Stanislav Šesták	(Slovakia) Žilina (Germany) VfL Bochum
2009	Marek Hamšík	(Italy) Napoli	Stanislav Šesták	(Germany) VfL Bochum	Ján Mucha	(Poland) Legia Warsaw
2010	Marek Hamšík	(Italy) Napoli	Róbert Vittek	(France) Lille (Turkey) Ankaragücü	Martin Škrtel	(England) Liverpool
2011	Martin Škrtel	(England) Liverpool	Marek Hamšík	(Italy) Napoli	Juraj Kucka	(Italy) Genoa
2012	Martin Škrtel	(England) Liverpool	Marek Hamšík	(Italy) Napoli	Marek Sapara	(Turkey) Trabzonspor
2013	Marek Hamšík	(Italy) Napoli	Martin Škrtel	(England) Liverpool	Juraj Kucka	(Italy) Genoa
2014	Marek Hamšík	(Italy) Napoli	Martin Škrtel	(England) Liverpool	Ján Ďurica	(Russia) Lokomotiv Moscow
2015	Marek Hamšík	(Italy) Napoli	Martin Škrtel	(England) Liverpool	Juraj Kucka	(Italy) Genoa (Italy) Milan
2016	Marek Hamšík	(Italy) Napoli	Martin Škrtel	(England) Liverpool (Turkey) Fenerbahçe	Róbert Mak	(Greece) PAOK (Russia) Zenit Saint Petersburg
2017	Marek Hamšík	(Italy) Napoli	Milan Škriniar	(Italy) Sampdoria (Italy) Inter Milan	Stanislav Lobotka	(Denmark) Nordsjælland (Spain) Celta Vigo
2018	Marek Hamšík	(Italy) Napoli	Milan Škriniar	(Italy) Inter Milan	Stanislav Lobotka	(Spain) Celta Vigo
2019	Milan Škriniar	(Italy) Inter Milan	Martin Dúbravka	(England) Newcastle United	Marek Hamšík	(China) Dalian Professional
2020	Milan Škriniar	(Italy) Inter Milan	Juraj Kucka	(Italy) Parma	Marek Hamšík	(China) Dalian Professional
2021	Milan Škriniar	(Italy) Inter Milan	Marek Hamšík	(Sweden) IFK Göteborg (Turkey) Trabzonspor	Juraj Kucka	(Italy) Parma (England) Watford
2022	Milan Škriniar	(Italy) Inter Milan	Stanislav Lobotka	(Italy) Napoli	Marek Hamšík	(Turkey) Trabzonspor
2023	Stanislav Lobotka	(Italy) Napoli	Dávid Hancko	(Netherlands) Feyenoord	Milan Škriniar	(Italy) Inter Milan (France) Paris Saint-Germain
2024	Stanislav Lobotka	(Italy) Napoli	Dávid Hancko	(Netherlands) Feyenoord	Lukáš Haraslín	(Czech Republic) Sparta Prague
2025	Dávid Hancko	(Netherlands) Feyenoord (Spain) Atlético Madrid	Stanislav Lobotka	(Italy) Napoli	Milan Škriniar	(France) Paris Saint-Germain (Turkey) Fenerbahçe

== Peter Dubovský Award ==
Peter Dubovský Award an annual title awarded to the best under-21 Slovak footballer of the year. The honour has been awarded since 2000 together with the Slovak Footballer of the Year award.

Year	1st place, gold medalist(s)	Club	2nd place, silver medalist(s)	Club	3rd place, bronze medalist(s)	Club
2000	Ľubomír Meszároš	(Slovakia) Slovan Bratislava				
2001	Róbert Vittek	(Slovakia) Slovan Bratislava	Mário Breška	(Slovakia) Matador Púchov	Stanislav Šesták	(Slovakia) Tatran Prešov
2002	Róbert Vittek	(Slovakia) Slovan Bratislava	Juraj Halenár	(Slovakia) Inter Bratislava	Martin Ďurica; Branislav Obžera	(Slovakia) Žilina (Slovakia) Slovan Bratislava
2003	Roland Števko	(Slovakia) Ružomberok	Milan Ivana	(Slovakia) AS Trenčín	Filip Šebo	(Germany) Köln II (Slovakia) Inter Bratislava
2004	Milan Ivana	(Czech Republic) Slovácko	Marek Čech; Martin Škrtel	(Slovakia) Inter Bratislava / (Czech Republic) Sparta Prague (Slovakia) AS Trenčín / (Russia) Zenit St. Petersburg	Roland Števko	(Slovakia) Ružomberok
2005	Martin Škrtel	(Russia) Zenit Saint Petersburg	Filip Hološko	(Czech Republic) Slovan Liberec	Erik Jendrišek	(Slovakia) Ružomberok
2006	Dušan Švento	(Czech Republic) Slavia Prague	Erik Jendrišek	(Slovakia) Ružomberok (Germany) Hannover 96	Adam Nemec	(Slovakia) Žilina
2007	Marek Hamšík	(Italy) Brescia (Italy) Napoli	Pavol Jurčo; Peter Pekarík	(Slovakia) Košice (Slovakia) Žilina	Filip Hlohovský; Peter Kleščík; Juraj Kucka; Lukáš Opiela; Jakub Sylvestr; Martin Tóth	(Slovakia) Trenčín (Slovakia) Trenčín (Slovakia) Ružomberok (Czech Republic) Tescoma Zlín (Slovakia) Slovan Bratislava (Slovakia) Nitra
2008	Marek Hamšík	(Italy) Napoli	Juraj Kucka; Miroslav Stoch	(Slovakia) Ružomberok (England) Chelsea	Ľuboš Kamenár	(Slovakia) Artmedia Petržalka
2009	Miroslav Stoch	(England) Chelsea (Netherlands) Twente	Vladimír Weiss	(England) Manchester City	Erik Grendel; Jakub Sylvestr	(Slovakia) Dubnica / (Slovakia) Slovan Bratislava (Slovakia) Artmedia / (Slovakia) Slovan Bratislava
2010	Miroslav Stoch	(England) Chelsea (Turkey) Fenerbahçe	Vladimír Weiss	(England) Bolton Wanderers (Scotland) Rangers	Jakub Sylvestr	(Slovakia) Slovan Bratislava (Croatia) Dinamo Zagreb
2011	Róbert Mak	(Germany) 1. FC Nürnberg	Filip Kiss	(Slovakia) Slovan Bratislava (England) Cardiff City	Milan Lalkovič	(England) Chelsea (England) Doncaster Rovers
2012	Róbert Mak	(Germany) 1. FC Nürnberg	Norbert Gyömbér	(Slovakia) Dukla Banská Bystrica	Ján Greguš; Lukáš Pauschek; Michal Obročník; Oliver Práznovský	(Czech Republic) Baník Ostrava (Slovakia) Slovan Bratislava (Slovakia) Rim. Sobota / (Slovakia) ViOn (Slovakia) Ružomberok
2013	Norbert Gyömbér	(Slovakia) Dukla B. Bystrica (Italy) Catania	Ondrej Duda	(Slovakia) Košice	Branislav Niňaj	(Slovakia) Slovan Bratislava
2014	Ondrej Duda	(Slovakia) Košice (Poland) Legia Warsaw	Adam Zreľák	(Slovakia) Ružomberok	Patrik Hrošovský; Branislav Niňaj; Stanislav Lobotka; Dobrivoj Rusov	(Czech Republic) Viktoria Plzeň (Slovakia) Slovan Bratislava (Netherlands) Jong Ajax / (Slovakia) AS Trenčín (Slovakia) Spartak Trnava
2015	Matúš Bero	(Slovakia) AS Trenčín	Ondrej Duda	(Poland) Legia Warsaw	Stanislav Lobotka	(Slovakia) AS Trenčín (Denmark) Nordsjælland
2016	Milan Škriniar	(Italy) Sampdoria	Matúš Bero	(Slovakia) AS Trenčín (Turkey) Trabzonspor	Nikolas Špalek	(Slovakia) Žilina
2017	Denis Vavro	(Slovakia) Žilina (Denmark) Copenhagen	László Bénes	(Germany) Borussia Mönchengladbach	Samuel Mráz	(Slovakia) Žilina
2018	Dávid Hancko	(Slovakia) Žilina (Italy) Fiorentina	Samuel Mráz	(Slovakia) Žilina (Italy) Empoli	Róbert Boženík; Andrej Fábry; Dominik Greif	(Slovakia) Žilina (Slovakia) Nitra (Slovakia) Slovan Bratislava
2019	Róbert Boženík	(Slovakia) Žilina (Netherlands) Feyenoord	Dávid Strelec	(Slovakia) Slovan Bratislava	Tomáš Bobček; Marián Chobot; Peter Pokorný	(Slovakia) Ružomberok (Slovakia) Nitra (Austria) Liefering
2020	David Strelec	(Slovakia) Slovan Bratislava	Róbert Boženík	(Netherlands) Feyenoord	Peter Pokorný	(Austria) Liefering (Austria) St. Pölten
2021	Tomáš Suslov	(Netherlands) Groningen	Jakub Kadák	(Slovakia) AS Trenčín	Sebastian Kóša	(Slovakia) Spartak Trnava
2022	Tomáš Suslov	(Netherlands) Groningen	Adrián Kaprálik	(Slovakia) MŠK Žilina	Adam Obert; David Strelec	(Italy) Cagliari (Italy) Spezia
2023	Leo Sauer	(Netherlands) Feyenoord	Adam Obert	(Italy) Cagliari	Adrián Kaprálik	(Slovakia) MŠK Žilina (Poland) Górnik Zabrze
2024	Leo Sauer	(Netherlands) Feyenoord				
2025	Leo Sauer	(Netherlands) Feyenoord (Netherlands) NAC	Nino Marcelli	(Slovakia) Slovan Bratislava	Mário Sauer	(Slovakia) MŠK Žilina (France) Toulouse

== Jozef Vengloš Award ==
This award is recognises manager of the year. This category allows the participation of foreign football managers managing Slovak teams, as well Slovak managers managing foreign teams. It was first awarded in 2010 to the best manager of 2009. It was named after Jozef Vengloš, following his passing in January 2021.

Year	1st place, gold medalist(s)	Club	2nd place, silver medalist(s)	Club	3rd place, bronze medalist(s)	Club
2009	(Slovakia) Vladimír Weiss Sr.	Slovakia	(Slovakia) Michal Hipp	Slovakia (assistant)	(Slovakia) Jozef Jankech	(Slovakia) Dukla Banská Bystrica
2010	(Slovakia) Vladimír Weiss Sr.	Slovakia	(Czech Republic) Pavel Hapal	(Slovakia) Žilina	(Slovakia) Stanislav Griga	(Slovakia) Senica
2011	(Slovakia) Stanislav Griga	(Slovakia) Senica	(Slovakia) Vladimír Weiss Sr.	Slovakia; Slovan Bratislava	(Slovakia) Juraj Jarábek	(Slovakia) ViOn Zlaté Moravce
2012	(Slovakia) Adrián Guľa	(Slovakia) AS Trenčín	(Slovakia) Ivan Galád	Slovakia U21	(Slovakia) Juraj Jarábek	(Slovakia) ViOn Zlaté Moravce
2013	(Slovakia) Ján Kozák Sr.	Košice; Slovakia	(Slovakia) Ladislav Hudec	(Slovakia) Spartak Myjava	(Slovakia) Ladislav Pecko	Slovakia U17
2014	(Slovakia) Ján Kozák Sr.	Slovakia	(Slovakia) Adrián Guľa	(Slovakia) Žilina	(Slovakia) Ivan Galád	Slovakia U21
2015	(Slovakia) Ján Kozák Sr.	Slovakia	(Slovakia) Martin Ševela	(Slovakia) AS Trenčín	(Czech Republic) Pavel Hapal	Slovakia U21
2016	(Slovakia) Ján Kozák Sr.	Slovakia	(Czech Republic) Pavel Hapal	Slovakia U21	(Slovakia) Adrián Guľa	(Slovakia) Žilina
2017	(Slovakia) Ján Kozák Sr. (Czech Republic) Pavel Hapal	Slovakia; Slovakia U21	Not awarded due to a shared first place		(Slovakia) Adrián Guľa	(Slovakia) Žilina
2018	(England) Nestor El Maestro	(Slovakia) Spartak Trnava	(Slovakia) Martin Ševela	(Slovakia) Slovan Bratislava	(Slovakia) Vladimír Weiss	(Georgia (country)) Georgia
2019	(Slovakia) Ján Kozák Jr.	(Slovakia) Slovan Bratislava	(Slovakia) Martin Ševela	(Slovakia) Slovan Bratislava (Poland) Zagłębie Lubin	(Czech Republic) Pavel Hapal	Slovakia
2020	(Slovakia) Vladimír Weiss Sr.	(Georgia (country)) Georgia	(Slovakia) Ján Kozák Jr.	(Slovakia) Slovan Bratislava	(Slovakia) Pavol Staňo	(Slovakia) Žilina
2021	(Slovakia) Vladimír Weiss Sr.	(Slovakia) Slovan Bratislava	(Slovakia) Michal Gašparík Jr.	(Slovakia) Spartak Trnava	(Slovakia) Pavol Staňo	(Slovakia) Žilina
2022	(Slovakia) Vladimír Weiss Sr.	(Slovakia) Slovan Bratislava	(Slovakia) Michal Gašparík Jr.	(Slovakia) Spartak Trnava	(Slovakia) Peter Struhár (Slovakia) Adrián Guľa	(Slovakia) Ružomberok (Slovakia) Dunajská Streda
2023	(Slovakia) Vladimír Weiss Sr.	(Slovakia) Slovan Bratislava	(Italy) Francesco Calzona	Slovakia	(Slovakia) Michal Gašparík Jr.	(Slovakia) Spartak Trnava
2024	(Slovakia) Vladimír Weiss Sr.	(Slovakia) Slovan Bratislava	(Italy) Francesco Calzona	Slovakia	(Slovakia) Michal Gašparík Jr.	(Slovakia) Spartak Trnava
2025	(Italy) Francesco Calzona	Slovakia	(Slovakia) Vladimír Weiss Sr.	(Slovakia) Slovan Bratislava	(Slovakia) Michal Gašparík Jr.	(Slovakia) Spartak Trnava (Poland) Górnik Zabrze

== League Player of the Year ==
This category is awarded to best domestic top-division players - that is Slovak and foreign players playing in the Fortuna Liga. It was first awarded in 2011, for the best domestic player of 2010.

Year	1st place, gold medalist(s)	Club	2nd place, silver medalist(s)	Club	3rd place, bronze medalist(s)	Club
2010	(Slovakia) Róbert Jež	Žilina	(Slovakia) Mário Pečalka	Žilina	(Slovakia) Kornel Saláta	Slovan Bratislava
2011	(Slovakia) Filip Šebo	Slovan Bratislava	(Slovakia) Miroslav Karhan	Spartak Trnava	(Slovakia) Igor Žofčák	Slovan Bratislava
2012	(Slovakia) Viktor Pečovský	Žilina	(Argentina) David Depetris	AS Trenčín	(Slovakia) Miroslav Karhan	Spartak Trnava
2013	(Slovakia) Róbert Vittek	Slovan Bratislava	(Slovakia) Tomáš Ďubek	Ružomberok	(Slovakia) Viktor Pečovský	Žilina
2014	(Slovakia) Viktor Pečovský	Žilina	(Slovakia) Ján Vlasko	Spartak Trnava	(Slovakia) Juraj Piroska	Senica
2015	(Slovakia) Matúš Bero (Slovakia) Viktor Pečovský	AS Trenčín; Žilina	Not awarded due to a shared first place		(Cameroon) Léandre Tawamba	ViOn Zlaté Moravce
2016	(Slovakia) Filip Hlohovský	Žilina	(Slovakia) Matúš Bero	AS Trenčín	(Slovakia) Michal Škvarka	Žilina
2017	(Slovakia) Michal Škvarka	Žilina	(Czech Republic) Jakub Mareš	Ružomberok/ Slovan Bratislava	(Curaçao) Rangelo Janga	AS Trenčín
2018	(Slovakia) Boris Godál	Spartak Trnava	(Slovenia) Andraž Šporar	Slovan Bratislava	(Morocco) Moha	Slovan Bratislava
2019	(Slovenia) Andraž Šporar	Slovan Bratislava	(Slovakia) Dominik Greif	Slovan Bratislava	(Slovakia) Róbert Boženík	Žilina
2020	(Hungary) Zsolt Kalmár	DAC Dunajská Streda	(Slovakia) Dominik Greif	Slovan Bratislava	(Slovakia) David Hrnčár	ViOn Zlaté Moravce
2021	(Slovakia) Vladimír Weiss Jr.	Slovan Bratislava	(Hungary) András Schäfer	DAC Dunajská Streda	(Slovakia) Martin Škrtel	Spartak Trnava
2022	(Slovakia) Vladimír Weiss Jr.	Slovan Bratislava	(Montenegro) Nikola Krstović	DAC Dunajská Streda	(Slovakia) Martin Regáli	Ružomberok
2023	(Slovakia) Juraj Kucka	Slovan Bratislava	(Serbia) Aleksandar Čavrić	Slovan Bratislava	(Slovakia) Róbert Polievka	Dukla Banská Bystrica

== Fan Award ==
It was first awarded during the 2012 award ceremony, for the fan favourite of 2011. Fans vote online and select one of ten shortlisted nominees for the Ján Popluhár Award.

Year	1st place, gold medalist(s)	Club
2011	Miroslav Karhan	(Germany) Mainz 05 (Slovakia) Spartak Trnava
2012	Martin Škrtel	(England) Liverpool
2013	Martin Škrtel	(England) Liverpool
2014	Martin Škrtel	(England) Liverpool
2015	Marek Hamšík	(Italy) Napoli
2016	Marek Hamšík	(Italy) Napoli
2017	Milan Škriniar	(Italy) Sampdoria Genoa (Italy) Inter Milan
2018	Milan Škriniar	(Italy) Inter Milan
2019	Martin Dúbravka	(England) Newcastle United
2020	Milan Škriniar	(Italy) Inter Milan
2021	Milan Škriniar	(Italy) Inter Milan
2022	Stanislav Lobotka	(Italy) Napoli
2023	Dávid Hancko	(Netherlands) Feyenoord
2024	Dávid Hancko	(Netherlands) Feyenoord
2025	Dávid Hancko	(Netherlands) Feyenoord (Spain) Atlético Madrid
