= Jaroslav Timko =

Czechoslovak and Slovak footballer

Personal information
- Full name: Jaroslav Timko
- Date of birth: 28 September 1965 (age 61)
- Place of birth: Valaliky, Czechoslovakia
- Position: Forward

Senior career*
Years	Team	Apps	(Gls)
1988–1993	ŠK Slovan Bratislava	127	(23)
1994–1996	FK Drnovice	42	(14)
1996–2001	Spartak Trnava	114	(31)

International career
1992–1993	Czechoslovakia	3	(0)
1992	Czechoslovakia B	1	(0)
1992	Czechoslovakia Olympic	1	(0)
1994–1997	Slovakia	18	(7)
- * Club domestic league appearances and goals

Jaroslav Timko (born 28 September 1965) is a Slovak former football player. He played for ŠK Slovan Bratislava, Petra Drnovice and FC Spartak Trnava. He played 3 matches for Czechoslovakia as well as making single appearances for Czechoslovakia B and Czechoslovakia Olympic. He later played 18 matches for Slovakia, scoring 7 international goals. He scored Slovakia's first-ever goal against the Czech Republic in their 1995 meeting.

At club level Timko was part of the title-winning Slovan Bratislava side in the 1991–92 Czechoslovak First League, playing in all 30 matches and scoring five goals during the season.

== International goals ==
#	Date	Venue	Opponent	Score	Result	Competition
.	29 March 1995	Všešportový areál, Košice, Slovakia	Azerbaijan	2–0	4–1	Euro 1996 Q
.	29 March 1995	Všešportový areál, Košice, Slovakia	Azerbaijan	4–0	4–1	Euro 1996 Q
