= Dušan Tittel =

Slovak footballer (born 1966)

- Born: 27 December 1966 (age 59); Námestovo, Czechoslovakia
- Education: University of Economics in Bratislava
- Children: 2

Member of the National Council
- Incumbent
- Assumed office 25 October 2023
- In office 23 March 2016 – 21 March 2020

Personal details
- Party: ANO (?); SNS (2014–2021); HLAS–SD (2021–)
- Website: tittel.sk
Association football career
- Height: 1.84 m (6 ft 0 in)
- Position: Defender
Youth career
- 1976–1982: Dolný Kubín
- 1982–1988: Slovan Bratislava
Senior career*
Years	Team	Apps	(Gls)
1988–1991	Slovan Bratislava	85	(13)
1992–1993	Nîmes	35	(1)
1993–1997	Slovan Bratislava	126	(34)
1997–1999	Spartak Trnava	53	(12)
1999–2001	Omonia Nicosia	30	(1)
2001	Slovan Bratislava	11	(2)
Total		340	(63)
International career
1990–1991	Czechoslovakia	11	(0)
1994–1998	Slovakia	44	(7)
Managerial career
- 2010: Slovan Bratislava
- 2015: Slovan Bratislava
- * Club domestic league appearances and goals

Dušan Tittel (born 27 December 1966) is a Slovak politician and former professional footballer who played as a defender. At international level, he represented Czechoslovakia and Slovakia. He was elected Slovakia Player of the Year three times.

== Early life and education ==
Tittel grew up in Dolný Kubín before settling in Bratislava. He started playing professional football in 1985 while also studying Finance at the University of Economics in Bratislava.

== Football career ==
Tittel played in the Czechoslovak First League, representing Slovan Bratislava between 1988 and 1991. He won the Slovak Cup with his side in the 1988–89 season. After a brief spell in France, where he played for Nîmes, he returned to play the final season of the Czechoslovak First League back at Slovan Bratislava. He made 11 appearances for Czechoslovakia between 1990 and 1991.

== Personal life ==
Tittel is married to Ivana with two children named Karolína and Timotej.

== Political career ==
After retiring from football in 2001, Tittel became active in politics. He was among the founding members of the Alliance of the New Citizen. Between 2001 and 2005, he served as a deputy in the regional assembly of the Bratislava region.

In 2014, Tittel joined the Slovak National Party and failed to ran on the party ticket in the 2014 European Parliament election. he succeeded in the 2016 Slovak parliamentary election and became the MP of the National Council.

In 2021, Tittel left the Slovak National Party and became a member of the Voice – Social Democracy party. In the 2023 Slovak parliamentary election, he won a mandate and became an MP.

== Football career ==
=== International goals ===
Scores and results list Slovakia's goal tally first, score column indicates score after each Tittel goal.

List of international goals scored by Dušan Tittel
No.	Date	Venue	Opponent	Score	Result	Competition
1	29 May 1994	Luzhniki Stadium, Moscow, Russia	Russia	1–0	1–2	Friendly match
2	29 March 1995	Všešportový areál, Košice, Slovakia	Azerbaijan	1–0	4–1	Euro 1996 qualification
3	22 September 1996	Tehelné pole, Bratislava, Slovakia	Malta	1–0	6–0	World Cup 1998 qualification
4	22 September 1996	Tehelné pole, Bratislava, Slovakia	Malta	6–0	6–0	World Cup 1998 qualification
5	13 November 1996	Estadio Heliodoro Rodríguez López, Santa Cruz, Spain	Spain	1–1	1–4	World Cup 1998 qualification
6	31 March 1997	National Stadium, Ta' Qali, Malta	Malta	2–0	2–0	World Cup 1998 qualification
7	9 February 1998	Antonis Papadopoulos Stadium, Larnaca, Cyprus	Finland	1–0	2–0	Cyprus International Football Tournament 1998

== Honours ==
=== Player ===
Slovan Bratislava

- Corgoň Liga: 1993–94, 1994–95, 1995–96
- Slovak Cup: 1989, 1994, 1997, 1998
- Slovak Super Cup: 1993, 1994

Omonia

- Cypriot First Division: 2000–01
- Cypriot Super Cup: 2001

Individual

- Slovak Footballer of the Year: 1995, 1996, 1997
- Slovak Top Eleven (6): 1993, 1994, 1995, 1996, 1997, 1998

=== Manager ===
Slovan Bratislava

- Slovak Cup: 2009–10
