= Všešportový areál =

Football stadium in Košice, Slovakia

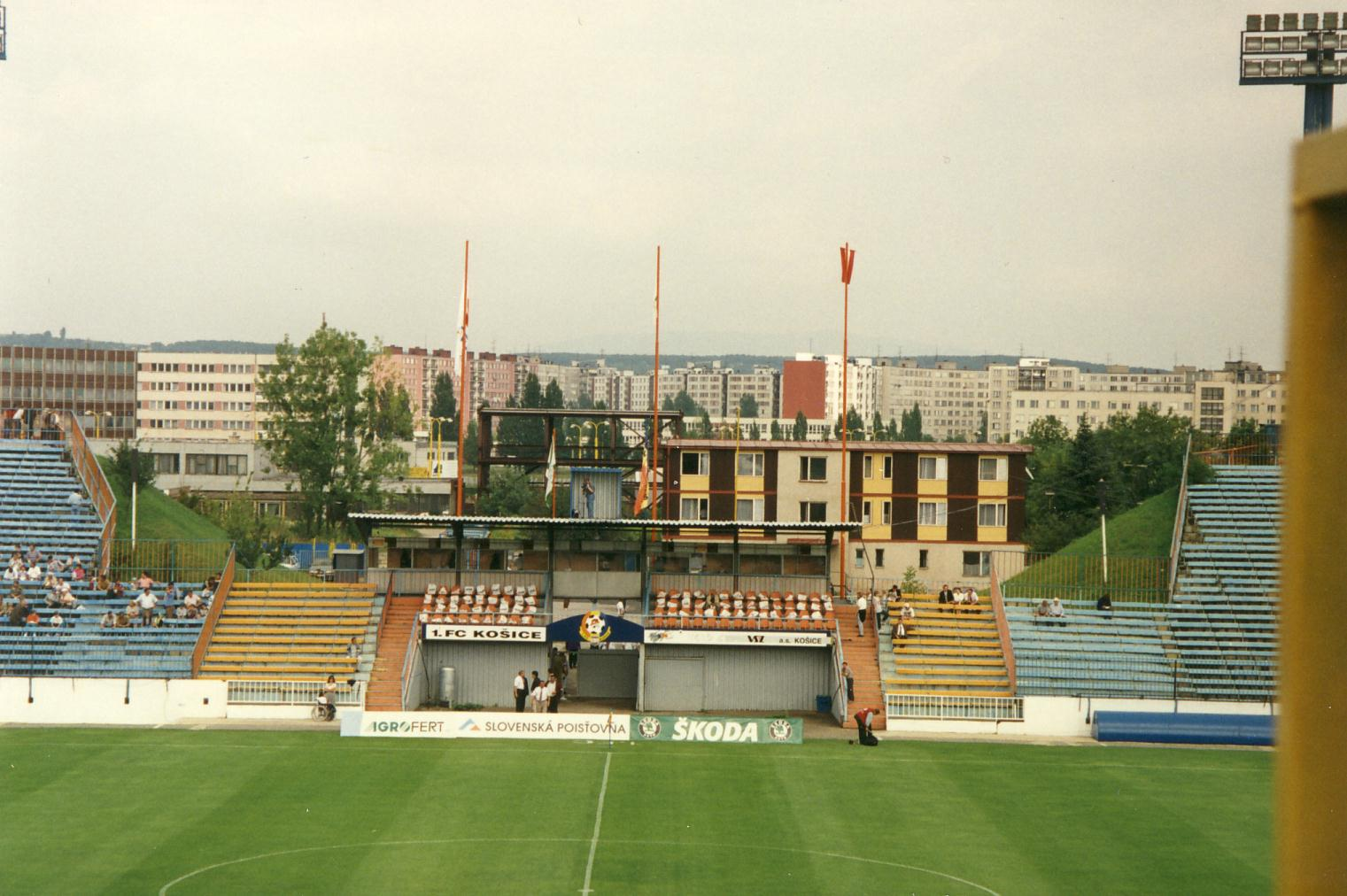
- Interactive map of Všešportový areál
- Full name: Všešportový areál
- Location: Košice, Slovakia
- Coordinates: 48°42′7.31″N 21°14′36.03″E
- Owner: Avalta, s.r.o.
- Capacity: 30,312
- Surface: Grass
- Field size: 105×75 m

Construction
- Opened: 1976
- Closed: 1997 (used until 2004 as training ground)
- Demolished: 2011

Tenants
- VSS / ZŤS / 1. FC Košice (1976–1997); Slovakia (1995)

Všešportový areál ("All Sports Complex") was a multi-purpose stadium in Košice, Slovakia. In its 21 years operating as a professional football ground, the Czechoslovakia national football team, then the independent Slovakia national football team, and local club FC VSS Košice played home matches there from 1976 to 1997.

== History ==
The Všešportový areál stadium opened on 29 February 1976 with a match against ZVL Žilina. The football stadium was demolished in 2011. The stadium was primarily used for football matches and held 30,312 spectators. It hosted six matches for the Czechoslovakia and four times for the independent Slovakia. VSS Košice, later renamed to ZŤS and 1. FC Košice, played there until 1997, moving to the renovated Štadión Lokomotívy. The complex also consisted of several football training grounds, basketball, handball and wrestling indoor arenas.

== New stadium ==
The club planned construction of a new stadium holding 20,000 spectators in a neighbourhood of older Všešportový areál stadium. The estimated cost of the stadium was €28 million. In 2017 club went to bankruptcy and new stadium Košická futbalová aréna was built by city of Košice and Slovak government in 2022.

== International matches ==
Všešportový areál hosted 1 friendly and 9 international competitive matches. One friendly and 3 of them by Slovakia national football team, and 6 of them by Czechoslovakia national football team.

10 March 1976 International Friendly	Czechoslovakia	2–2	Soviet Union	Košice, Czechoslovakia
15:00; Match 330	Anton Ondruš 83'; Zdeněk Nehoda 89'		Oleg Blokhin 26'; Vladimir Troshkin 32'	Stadium: Všešportový areál Attendance: 40,000; Referee: Lajos Somlai (Hungary)

30 April 1980 International Friendly	Czechoslovakia	1–0	Hungary	Košice, Czechoslovakia
16:30; Match 374	Zdeněk Nehoda 73'			Stadium: Všešportový areál Attendance: 30.000; Referee: Jerzy Kacprzak (Poland)

26 September 1990 UEFA Euro 1992 qualifying	Czechoslovakia	1–0	Iceland	Košice, Czechoslovakia
16:00; Match 471	Václav Daněk 43'			Stadium: Všešportový areál Attendance: 30,142; Referee: Todor Colev (Bulgaria)

23 September 1992 1994 FIFA World Cup qualification – UEFA Group 4	Czechoslovakia	4–0	Faroe Islands	Košice, Czechoslovakia
16:00; Match 491	Václav Němeček 23'; Pavel Kuka 84', 86'; Peter Dubovský 90' (pen.)			Stadium: Všešportový areál Attendance: 16,278; Referee: Ahmet Çakar (Turkey)

2 June 1993 1994 FIFA World Cup qualification – UEFA Group 4	Representation of Czechs and Slovaks	5–2	Romania	Košice, Slovakia
17:00; Match 495	Petr Vrabec 13'; Radoslav Látal 37'; Peter Dubovský 58', 84', 90'		Florin Răducioiu 26', 55'	Stadium: Všešportový areál Attendance: 15,000; Referee: Kim Milton Nielsen (Denmark)

27 October 1993 1994 FIFA World Cup qualification – UEFA Group 4	Representation of Czechs and Slovaks	3–0	Cyprus	Košice, Slovakia
16:30; Match 498	Peter Dubovský 11'; Pavel Hapal 37'; Tomáš Skuhravý 77'			Stadium: Všešportový areál Attendance: 16,602; Referee: Lube Spasov (Bulgaria)

8 March 1995 International Friendly	Slovakia	2–1	Russia	Košice, Slovakia
Match 8	Peter Dubovský 19', 69'	Report	Valeri Karpin 76'	Stadium: Všešportový areál Attendance: 10,200; Referee: Hans-Jürgen Weber (Germany)

29 March 1995 1996 UEFA EURO; Qualifying Group 1	Slovakia	4–1	Azerbaijan	Košice, Slovakia
18:00; Match 10	Dušan Tittel 34'; Jaroslav Timko 40', 51'; Peter Dubovský 45' (pen.)	Report	Nazim Suleymanov 80' (pen.)	Stadium: Všešportový areál Attendance: 12,450; Referee: Vassilios Nikakis (Greece)

6 September 1995 1996 UEFA EURO; Qualifying Group 1	Slovakia	1–0	Israel	Košice, Slovakia
18:00; Match 15	Tibor Jančula 54'	Report		Stadium: Všešportový areál Attendance: 7,810; Referee: Marnix Sandra (Belgium)

15 November 1995 1996 UEFA EURO; Qualifying Group 1	Slovakia	0–2	Romania	Košice, Slovakia
17:30; Match 17		Report	Gheorghe Hagi 66'; Dorinel Munteanu 82'	Stadium: Všešportový areál Attendance: 9,676; Referee: Jaap Uilenberg (Netherlands)
