= Miroslav Chvíla =

Czechoslovak footballer (born 1967)

Personal information
- Date of birth: 28 March 1967 (age 59)
- Position: Defender

Senior career*
Years	Team	Apps	(Gls)
1986–1988	Dukla Banská Bystrica		
1988–1997	Slovan Bratislava		
1997–1999	Artmedia Petržalka		

International career
1992	Czechoslovakia	1	(0)
1994	Slovakia	1	(1)
- * Club domestic league appearances and goals

Miroslav Chvíla (born 28 March 1967) is a former footballer who played international football for both Czechoslovakia and Slovakia. He played as a defender for Dukla Banská Bystrica, Slovan Bratislava and Artmedia Petržalka.
