= 1991–92 Czechoslovak First League =

Czechoslovak First League
- Season: 1991–92
- Champions: Slovan Bratislava
- Relegated: Union Cheb; Dukla Banská Bystrica
- Champions League: Slovan Bratislava
- Cup Winners' Cup: Sparta Prague
- UEFA Cup: Sigma Olomouc; Slavia Prague
- Top goalscorer: Peter Dubovský (27 goals)

Statistics of Czechoslovak First League in the 1991–92 season. Peter Dubovský was the league's top scorer with 27 goals.

== Overview ==
It was contested by 16 teams, and ŠK Slovan Bratislava won the championship.

== Stadia and locations ==
Location of clubs in the 1991–92 Czechoslovak First League

== League standings ==
Pos	Team	Pld	W	D	L	GF	GA	GD	Pts	Qualification or relegation
1	Slovan Bratislava (C)	30	23	5	2	60	19	+41	51	Qualification for Champions League first round
2	Sparta Prague	30	22	4	4	68	20	+48	48	Qualification for Cup Winners' Cup first round
3	Sigma Olomouc	30	17	9	4	60	23	+37	43	Qualification for UEFA Cup first round
4	Slavia Prague	30	17	7	6	63	26	+37	41	Qualification for UEFA Cup first round
5	Baník Ostrava	30	13	9	8	50	36	+14	35	
6	Inter Bratislava	30	12	6	12	45	45	0	30	
7	Tatran Prešov	30	12	5	13	33	43	−10	29	
8	Bohemians Prague	30	10	7	13	38	43	−5	27	
9	DAC Dunajská Streda	30	10	6	14	46	46	0	26	
10	Vítkovice	30	9	5	16	34	55	−21	23	
11	Dukla Prague	30	6	10	14	30	42	−12	22	
12	Spartak Hradec Králové	30	7	8	15	22	39	−17	22	
13	České Budějovice	30	7	8	15	34	59	−25	22	
14	Spartak Trnava	30	6	9	15	21	59	−38	21	
15	Union Cheb (R)	30	7	7	16	28	53	−25	21	Relegation to Czech-Moravian Football League
16	Dukla Banská Bystrica (R)	30	7	5	18	30	54	−24	19	Relegation to Slovak National Football League

Source: rsssf.com
(C) Champions; (R) Relegated

== Results ==
Home \ Away	OST	BOH	ČBU	DAC	BB	DUK	HRK	INT	OLO	SLA	SLO	SPA	TRN	PRE	CHE	VÍT
Baník Ostrava		0–1	4–0	2–1	3–1	2–0	5–2	2–2	1–1	1–1	0–3	1–1	3–0	3–0	2–1	1–0
Bohemians Prague	3–2		1–2	4–3	2–2	0–2	0–0	0–2	1–0	1–3	0–0	0–3	1–1	1–2	1–0	3–1
České Budějovice	0–0	0–2		2–1	2–0	3–2	0–0	2–1	0–0	0–4	1–2	0–2	2–2	1–3	0–2	2–2
DAC Dunajská Streda	3–2	4–1	2–2		2–1	1–1	2–0	0–3	0–1	2–2	0–1	1–2	4–1	3–0	0–2	4–0
Dukla Banská Bystrica	2–0	2–1	6–1	1–1		2–0	1–1	0–2	0–4	0–1	0–0	0–2	0–1	0–1	1–0	2–1
Dukla Prague	1–3	0–0	1–3	3–2	3–2		0–2	0–0	1–1	2–2	0–1	1–1	0–0	1–0	2–2	3–1
Hradec Králové	1–1	3–1	1–1	0–2	0–2	0–0		3–0	0–1	1–0	0–1	0–1	2–0	3–0	1–0	0–3
Inter Bratislava	1–2	0–0	2–1	5–2	2–0	0–2	2–0		1–1	2–0	0–3	1–2	2–0	1–2	6–0	1–2
Sigma Olomouc	1–1	3–1	2–1	3–1	4–0	3–1	5–0	3–0		1–3	0–0	2–0	2–0	2–1	1–1	3–1
Slavia Prague	1–2	1–1	3–1	1–0	2–1	1–1	2–0	1–2	0–2		3–1	1–1	6–0	5–0	4–0	5–1
Slovan Bratislava	1–0	3–2	3–1	3–0	2–1	3–1	2–0	4–1	1–1	3–2		0–3	4–1	4–0	3–0	3–0
Sparta Prague	3–0	1–0	3–1	2–0	6–0	2–1	3–0	8–1	3–2	0–1	1–2		3–0	4–1	3–0	2–1
Spartak Trnava	2–2	0–5	1–2	1–1	1–0	1–0	2–1	0–0	1–7	0–2	0–2	0–0		1–3	2–1	2–1
Tatran Prešov	0–0	0–1	3–0	0–0	6–1	1–0	1–0	0–2	1–1	0–1	1–3	1–0	0–0		1–1	4–1
Union Cheb	3–0	2–4	2–2	0–2	2–1	1–0	1–1	3–1	1–3	0–5	0–0	0–2	1–1	0–1		2–1
Vítkovice	0–5	1–0	2–1	0–2	1–1	2–1	0–0	2–2	1–0	0–0	0–2	2–4	2–0	3–0	2–0	

Source: statistiky1ligy.fotbal.cz
Legend: Blue = home team win; Yellow = draw; Red = away team win.

== Attendances ==
No.	Club	Average
1	Slovan	14,966
2	Slavia Praha	7,728
3	Sigma	7,507
4	Sparta Praha	7,431
5	Tatran	4,970
6	Hradec Králové	4,875
7	Česke Budějovice	4,753
8	DAC	4,355
9	Bohemians	3,833
10	Baník	3,787
11	Spartak Trnava	3,660
12	Dukla Banská Bystrica	3,041
13	Vítkovice	2,991
14	Cheb	2,631
15	Inter Bratislava	2,287
16	Dukla Praha	2,042

== Top scorers ==
The top goalscorers in the 1991–92 Czechoslovak First League were as follows:

Rank	Player	Club	Goals
1	(Czechoslovakia) Peter Dubovský	ŠK Slovan Bratislava	27
2	(Czechoslovakia) Pavel Kuka	Slavia Prague	19
3	(Czechoslovakia) Alexander Vencel	ŠK Slovan Bratislava	16
4	(Czechoslovakia) Martin Obšitník	Inter Bratislava	15
5	(Czechoslovakia) Petr Kouba (Czechoslovakia) Roman Hanus	Sparta Prague; Sigma Olomouc	14
7	(Czechoslovakia) Horst Siegl (Czechoslovakia) Radim Nečas (Commonwealth of Independent States) Viktor Dvirnyk	Sparta Prague; FC Baník Ostrava; FK Inter Bratislava	13
