= Ronen Harazi =

Israeli footballer

Personal information
- Full name: Ronen Harazi
- Date of birth: 30 March 1970 (age 56)
- Place of birth: Ramat Gan, Israel
- Position: Forward

Youth career
- Hapoel Ramat Gan

Senior career*
| Years | Team | Apps | (Gls) |
| 1986–1992 | Hapoel Ramat Gan | 139 | (35) |
| 1992–1997 | Beitar Jerusalem | 134 | (58) |
| 1997–1998 | UD Salamanca | 2 | (0) |
| 1998 | → Hapoel Haifa (loan) | 14 | (10) |
| 1998–1999 | Bursaspor | 13 | (6) |
| 1999 | → Maccabi Haifa (loan) | 8 | (1) |
| 1999–2001 | Hapoel Tel Aviv | 27 | (17) |
| Total | | 337 | (127) |

International career
| 1992–1999 | Israel | 53 | (23) |
- * Club domestic league appearances and goals as of 7 March 2007

Ronen Harazi (Hebrew: רונן חרזי; born 30 March 1970) is a former Israeli footballer.

== Beitar ==
During his time at Beitar, Harazi attracted interest from English side Sunderland. The club was ready to place a £400,000 bid for Harazi, but the player failed a medical examination, due to a metal rod inserted in his leg. Harazi took the matter to FIFA, demanding a £600,000 payout from Sunderland.

== Loan to Haifa ==
After establishing himself on a wider stage, he was brought to Haifa on loan to provide cover for Alon Mizrahi's departure to French club, Nice. Harazi had trouble acclimating to Haifa and fighting for a first team spot against new signing Viktor Paço.

== International goals ==
| # | Date | Venue | Opponent | Score | Result | Competition |
|---|---|---|---|---|---|---|
| 1 | 27 April 1993 | Chornomorets Stadium, Odesa, Ukraine | Ukraine | 1–0 | 1–1 | Friendly |
| 2 | 12 May 1993 | Vasil Levski National Stadium, Sofia, Bulgaria | Bulgaria | 1–1 | 2–2 | 1994 FIFA World Cup qualification |
| 3 | 5 October 1993 | Tsirion Stadium, Limassol, Cyprus | Cyprus | 1–1 | 2–2 | Friendly |
| 4 | 5 October 1993 | Tsirion Stadium, Limassol, Cyprus | Cyprus | 2–1 | 2–2 | Friendly |
| 5 | 13 October 1993 | Parc des Princes, Paris, France | France | 1–0 | 3–2 | 1994 FIFA World Cup qualification |
| 6 | 10 November 1993 | Ramat Gan Stadium, Ramat Gan, Israel | Finland | 1–3 | 1–3 | 1994 FIFA World Cup qualification |
| 7 | 20 April 1994 | Žalgiris Stadium, Vilnius, Lithuania | Lithuania | 1–0 | 1–1 | Friendly |
| 8 | 4 September 1994 | Ramat Gan Stadium, Ramat Gan, Israel | Poland | 1–0 | 2–1 | Euro 1996 qualifying |
| 9 | 4 September 1994 | Ramat Gan Stadium, Ramat Gan, Israel | Poland | 2–0 | 2–1 | Euro 1996 qualifying |
| 10 | 12 October 1994 | Ramat Gan Stadium, Ramat Gan, Israel | Slovakia | 1–1 | 2–2 | Euro 1996 qualifying |
| 11 | 16 November 1994 | Hüseyin Avni Aker Stadium, Trabzon, Turkey | Azerbaijan | 1–0 | 2–0 | Euro 1996 qualifying |
| 12 | 29 November 1994 | Teddy Stadium, Jerusalem, Israel | Cyprus | 3–2 | 4–3 | Friendly |
| 13 | 14 February 1995 | Yud-Alef Stadium, Ashdod, Israel | Luxembourg | 1–0 | 4–2 | Friendly |
| 14 | 8 March 1995 | Şükrü Saracoğlu Stadium, Istanbul, Turkey | Turkey | 1–0 | 1–2 | Friendly |
| 15 | 11 October 1995 | Bloomfield Stadium, Tel Aviv, Israel | Azerbaijan | 1–0 | 2–0 | Euro 1996 qualifying |
| 16 | 11 October 1995 | Bloomfield Stadium, Tel Aviv, Israel | Azerbaijan | 2–0 | 2–0 | Euro 1996 qualifying |
| 17 | 24 January 1996 | Municipal Stadium of Chalkida, Chalkida, Greece | Greece | 1–2 | 1–2 | Friendly |
| 18 | 1 September 1996 | Ramat Gan Stadium, Ramat Gan, Israel | Bulgaria | 1–1 | 2–1 | 1998 FIFA World Cup qualification |
| 19 | 18 February 1998 | Ramat Gan Stadium, Ramat Gan, Israel | Turkey | 2–0 | 4–0 | Friendly |
| 20 | 18 January 1999 | Ramat Gan Stadium, Ramat Gan, Israel | Estonia | 3–0 | 7–0 | Friendly |
| 21 | 18 January 1999 | Ramat Gan Stadium, Ramat Gan, Israel | Estonia | 4–0 | 7–0 | Friendly |
| 22 | 24 February 1999 | Teddy Stadium, Jerusalem, Israel | Latvia | 2–0 | 2–0 | Friendly |
| 23 | 10 March 1999 | Stadionul Steaua, Bucharest, Romania | Romania | 1–0 | 2–0 | Friendly |

== Honours ==
- Beitar Jerusalem:
- Israeli Premier League (2):1992–93, 1996–97
- Hapoel Tel Aviv:
- Israeli Premier League (1)1999-00
- State Cup (1):1999-00
