= Ondrej Krištofík =

Slovak footballer

Personal information
- Date of birth: 10 September 1966 (age 60)
- Place of birth: Bratislava, Czechoslovakia
- Position: Midfielder

Senior career*
Years	Team	Apps	(Gls)
1986–1987	Slovan Bratislava	16	(1)
1987–1989	VTJ Tábor	50	(2)
1989–1994	Slovan Bratislava	108	(6)
1994–1996	Slavia Prague	51	(3)
1996–1998	Hapoel Petah Tikva	51	(3)
1998–1999	Spartak Trnava	18	(2)
Total		294	(17)

International career
1991–1992	Czechoslovakia	6	(1)
1994–1995	Slovakia	7	(0)
Medal record
SK Slavia Prague
Winner	Gambrinus liga	1995–96
- * Club domestic league appearances and goals

Ondrej Krištofík (born 10 September 1966) is a Slovak retired football player. He played for ŠK Slovan Bratislava, FC Spartak Trnava and SK Slavia Praha. He won the Czech league title with Slavia. He earned seven caps for the Slovakia national football team.

== International career ==
Krištofík made six appearances for the full Czechoslovakia national football team, his debut coming in a friendly against Australia on 30 January 1991.
