= 1992–93 Czechoslovak First League =

Czechoslovak First League
- Season: 1992–93
- Dates: 15 August 1992 – 11 June 1993
- Champions: Sparta Prague
- Relegated: none
- Champions League: Sparta Prague
- Cup Winners' Cup: Boby Brno
- UEFA Cup: Slavia Prague; Slovan Bratislava; Dunajská Streda
- Top goalscorer: Peter Dubovský (24 goals)

The 1992–93 season of the Czechoslovak First League was the last in which teams from the Czech Republic and Slovakia competed together. Peter Dubovský was the league's top scorer with 24 goals. The league was succeeded at the end of the season by the Czech First League and the Slovak Super Liga.

== Overview ==
With the 1992 decision at Villa Tugendhat to enact the Dissolution of Czechoslovakia into two independent states, the 1992–93 season of the Czechoslovak First League spanned the end of Czechoslovakia and the beginning of the successor states. The league was contested by 16 teams, and Sparta Prague won the championship, finishing five points ahead of second-placed Slavia Prague. Czechoslovakia received one of the slots of UN banned Yugoslavia for the UEFA Cup. Brno was invited as the Czech club to the Cup Winners Cup because the Czechoslovak Cup was won by a Slovak side, 1. FC Košice, and the losing finalists were Sparta Prague.

Although Slovak clubs were guaranteed a place in the following season's inaugural Slovak League, any Czech teams finishing the bottom two league positions would have to play a two-legged play-off with a team from the Czech second tier, with the top six of that league being automatically promoted. Dukla Prague, who used a league-high 38 players during the season, as well as Bohemians Prague each secured 19 points. As the teams were split by goal average rather than goal difference, Dukla were safe from relegation with a 14th-place finish and Bohemians finished 15th to go to a play-off. They faced seventh-placed Second League side FK Jablonec, drawing 1–1 away but winning 2–0 at home to confirm their top-flight status for the following season.

== Stadiums and locations ==
Location of clubs in the 1992–93 Czechoslovak First League

== League standings ==
Pos	Team	Pld	W	D	L	GF	GA	GAv	Pts	Qualification
1	Sparta Prague (C)	30	23	2	5	66	24	2.750	48	Qualification for Champions League first round
2	Slavia Prague	30	18	7	5	70	28	2.500	43	Qualification for UEFA Cup first round
3	Slovan Bratislava (Note: The 6 Slovak clubs moved to the Slovak Superliga after the end of this season.)	30	19	4	7	61	31	1.968	42	Qualification for UEFA Cup first round
4	DAC Dunajská Streda	30	16	5	9	46	36	1.278	37	Qualification for UEFA Cup first round
5	Sigma Olomouc	30	14	7	9	44	38	1.158	35	
6	Baník Ostrava	30	10	11	9	47	38	1.237	31	
7	Inter Bratislava	30	14	3	13	46	42	1.095	31	
8	Boby Brno	30	13	5	12	40	51	0.784	31	Qualification for Cup Winners' Cup first round (Note: Boby Brno were invited to represent Czech Republic in the Cup Winners' Cup as Czech Cup runners-up (semifinal phase of Czechoslovak Cup), given winner Sparta Prague's qualification to the Champions League. Košice were the winners of Czechoslovak Cup but they represented Slovakia in the Cup Winners' Cup.)
9	Hradec Králové	30	10	7	13	32	36	0.889	27	
10	Vítkovice	30	9	9	12	30	44	0.682	27	
11	Tatran Prešov	30	9	8	13	42	40	1.050	26	
12	Nitra	30	6	13	11	27	38	0.711	25	
13	České Budějovice	30	9	5	16	36	39	0.923	23	
14	Dukla Prague	30	7	5	18	38	74	0.514	19	
15	Bohemians Prague	30	5	9	16	23	53	0.434	19	Second chance
16	Spartak Trnava	30	3	10	17	24	60	0.400	16	

Source: No relegation in Slovakia due to nation’s end. Playoff in Czechia: 16 June, FK Jablonec-Bohemians 1-1; 23 June Bohemians-Jablonec 2-0.
(C) Champions

== Results ==
Home \ Away	OST	BRN	BOH	ČBU	DAC	DUK	HRK	INT	NIT	OLO	SLA	SLO	SPA	TRN	PRE	VÍT
Baník Ostrava		1–1	1–0	0–0	1–2	1–1	2–0	2–0	1–1	2–3	2–3	1–0	0–2	4–0	3–1	2–0
Boby Brno	3–2		1–1	1–0	2–0	2–1	2–1	2–1	2–1	1–1	0–2	0–4	1–5	1–0	3–0	1–2
Bohemians Prague	0–3	1–3		1–0	1–2	1–1	0–3	2–2	0–0	0–0	1–3	1–2	0–3	2–0	3–1	3–0
České Budějovice	1–4	1–1	1–0		1–0	0–1	0–0	2–1	1–0	2–1	4–2	1–3	2–4	5–0	2–0	0–1
DAC Dunajská Streda	0–0	4–1	5–0	1–1		3–1	3–2	2–0	3–1	1–0	4–2	1–0	3–3	1–0	1–0	0–1
Dukla Prague	1–2	1–4	1–1	2–7	1–2		4–1	1–2	0–2	5–2	0–6	3–2	1–4	1–1	2–1	0–1
Hradec Králové	2–0	2–1	1–0	1–0	3–0	1–2		0–1	2–2	1–0	0–2	1–3	1–2	0–0	2–0	0–1
Inter Bratislava	2–1	2–3	2–0	1–0	0–0	8–1	3–1		1–0	4–1	0–0	0–2	1–0	5–1	1–2	2–1
Nitra	2–2	2–0	0–0	3–2	1–0	0–1	0–0	3–0		1–1	1–1	1–2	0–1	1–1	1–1	2–0
Sigma Olomouc	2–2	1–0	4–1	2–1	1–0	2–0	0–0	3–0	3–0		4–3	2–1	1–3	3–0	3–0	2–0
Slavia Prague	1–1	5–0	4–0	2–1	1–0	4–1	0–0	3–0	7–0	3–0		3–0	2–0	3–2	1–1	2–1
Slovan Bratislava	1–0	1–0	4–0	2–0	3–1	6–1	3–1	2–3	3–1	0–0	2–1		1–1	4–1	1–1	3–0
Sparta Prague	3–1	3–0	4–1	1–0	4–0	2–0	2–1	3–1	2–0	3–0	0–2	3–0		1–2	2–1	2–0
Spartak Trnava	2–2	2–2	1–2	1–1	2–2	1–0	1–2	2–1	0–0	0–1	1–1	1–2	0–1		1–1	0–2
Tatran Prešov	3–3	3–0	0–0	2–0	1–2	2–1	0–1	1–0	1–1	3–0	1–0	0–2	1–2	7–1		6–0
Vítkovice	1–1	1–2	1–1	1–0	2–3	3–3	2–2	1–2	0–0	1–1	1–1	2–2	1–0	2–0	1–1	

Source: statistiky1ligy.fotbal.cz
Legend: Blue = home team win; Yellow = draw; Red = away team win.

== Czech First League qualification play-off ==
Team 1	Agg.	Team 2	1st leg	2nd leg
LIAZ Jablonec	1–3	Bohemians Prague	1–1	0–2

== Attendances ==
#	Club	Average	Highest
1	Slovan	11,431	20,000
2	Brno	10,597	26,575
3	Sparta Praha	9,395	29,270
4	Sigma Olomouc	6,797	10,774
5	Slavia Praha	6,598	17,580
6	Hradec Králové	5,748	15,290
7	DAC	4,602	7,587
8	České Budějovice	4,450	8,096
9	Tatran Prešov	4,162	11,892
10	Ostrava	3,813	10,153
11	Inter Bratislava	3,614	14,907
12	Nitra	3,485	10,203
13	Spartak Trnava	3,377	7,667
14	Bohemians	3,305	7,497
15	Vítkovice	2,582	11,119
16	Dukla	2,105	8,095

== Top scorers ==
The top goalscorers in the 1992–93 Czechoslovak First League were:

Rank	Player	Club	Goals
1	(Slovakia) Peter Dubovský	Slovan Bratislava	24
2	(Czech Republic) Pavel Kuka	Slavia Prague	23
3	(Slovakia) Ľubomír Luhový	Inter Bratislava	17
4	(Czech Republic) Marek Poštulka	Baník Ostrava	16
5	(Czech Republic) Horst Siegl	Sparta Prague	14
6	(Slovakia) Pavol Diňa	Dunajská Streda	13
7	(Slovakia) Vladislav Zvara	Tatran Prešov	11
8	(Czech Republic) Patrik Berger	Slavia Prague	10
9	(Czech Republic) Edvard Lasota	Boby Brno	9
9	(Czech Republic) Jan Saidl	Dukla Prague	9
9	(Slovakia) Július Šimon	Dunajská Streda	9
9	(Czech Republic) Jan Suchopárek	Slavia Prague	9
