= Vyacheslav Lychkin =

Azerbaijani footballer (born 1973)

Personal information
- Full name: Vyacheslav Lychkin
- Date of birth: 30 September 1973 (age 53)
- Place of birth: Baku, Azerbaijan SSR, Soviet Union
- Height: 1.82 m (5 ft 11 1/2 in)
- Position: Midfielder

Senior career*
Years	Team	Apps	(Gls)
1989–1990	FC Termist Baku	18	(0)
1991	Neftchi Baku PFC	3	(0)
1991	Dinamo Baku	25	(3)
1992	FC Dynamo Stavropol	3	(0)
1992	FC Nart Cherkessk	17	(5)
1993–1994	FC Anzhi Makhachkala	55	(10)
1995–1996	Neftchi Baku PFC	30	(4)
1996	Trabzonspor	1	(0)
1997	TPS	19	(6)
1997	Kapaz Ganja	11	(2)
1998	FC Tyumen	11	(4)
1999	FC Torpedo-ZIL Moscow	9	(0)
1999	FC Kristall Smolensk	11	(4)
2000	FC Lokomotiv Saint Petersburg	11	(3)
2000–2001	FC Dynamo-SPb St. Petersburg	15	(5)
2002	FC Kondopoga (amateur)		
2002	FC Spartak Lukhovitsy	19	(10)
2003	FC Gazovik-Gazprom Izhevsk	37	(1)
2004	FC Vidnoye	17	(8)
2004–2005	FK Khazar Lankaran	29	(4)
2005–2006	FC Inter Baku	21	(4)
2007–2008	FK Simurq Zaqatala	21	(0)

International career
1995–2001	Azerbaijan	45	(4)
- * Club domestic league appearances and goals as of 1 January 2009

Vyacheslav Lychkin (Russian: Вячеслав Лычкин; born 30 September 1973) is a retired Azerbaijani professional footballer. He made his professional debut in the Soviet Second League in 1989 for FC Termist Baku.

== International career ==
For Azerbaijan, Lychkin is capped 45 times, scoring 4 goal. He made his national team debut on 26 April 1995 against Romania in Euro 1996 qualifying. He scored his first goal on 27 February 1996 against Faroe Islands in a friendly match.

== International goals ==
#	Date	Venue	Opponent	Score	Result	Competition
1	27 February 1996	Antonis Papadopoulos Stadium, Larnaca,	Faroe Islands	1–0	3–0	Friendly
2	10 September 1997	Nepstadion, Budapest,	Hungary	3-1	3–1	1998 FIFA World Cup qualification
3	6 March 1999	Antonis Papadopoulos Stadium, Larnaca,	Estonia	2-0	2–2	Friendly
4	5 March 1999	Tofiq Bahramov Stadium, Baku,	Liechtenstein	2-0	4–0	UEFA Euro 2000 qualifying

== Honours ==
- Azerbaijan Premier League champion: 1997–98.
- Azerbaijan Premier League runner-up: 2004–05.
