= Peter Dubovský (footballer) =

Slovak footballer (1972–2000)

Personal information
- Date of birth: 7 May 1972
- Place of birth: Bratislava, Czechoslovakia
- Date of death: 23 June 2000 (aged 28)
- Place of death: Ko Samui, Thailand
- Height: 1.79 m (5 ft 10 in)
- Position: Forward

Youth career
- 1982–1985: FKM Vinohrady
- 1985–1989: Slovan Bratislava

Senior career*
Years	Team	Apps	(Gls)
1989–1993	Slovan Bratislava	94	(59)
1993–1995	Real Madrid	31	(2)
1995–2000	Oviedo	120	(17)
Total		245	(78)

International career
1991–1993	Czechoslovakia	14	(6)
1994–2000	Slovakia	33	(12)
- * Club domestic league appearances and goals

Peter Dubovský (7 May 1972 – 23 June 2000) was a Slovak professional footballer who played as a forward.

After starting his career with Slovan Bratislava he played seven years in Spain, amassing La Liga totals of 151 games and 19 goals for two teams.

Dubovský died in 2000 at 28, while on vacation in Thailand.

== Club career ==
Born in Bratislava, Czechoslovakia, Dubovský made his professional debut with local ŠK Slovan Bratislava, for whom he signed at the age of 13. Only four years later he made his first Czechoslovak First League appearance, and went on to score 51 goals in only 59 appearances in his last two seasons combined (leading the scoring charts on both occasions), being an instrumental offensive figure as his hometown club won the national championship in 1992.

After being named the Slovak Footballer of the Year in 1993, Dubovský moved to Spain and signed for La Liga giants Real Madrid. He appeared in 26 games in his first season but was completely ostracized by new manager Jorge Valdano in his second and last, his options being further diminished at the club following the emergence of 17-year-old Raúl.

Dubovský remained in the country – and its top division – in the following five years, playing for Real Oviedo and scoring a career-best in Spain seven goals in 31 matches in the 1995–96 campaign, helping the Asturians to the 14th position.

== International career ==
Dubovský made his debut for Czechoslovakia on 13 November 1991 at the age of 19, starting in a 2–1 away loss against Spain for the UEFA Euro 1992 qualifiers. He went on to appear in a further 13 internationals in the following two years, scoring six goals.

After the independence of Slovakia, Dubovský represented its national team, scoring 12 goals in 33 appearances for the emerging national side.

== Death ==
On 23 June 2000, Dubovský was on vacation in Thailand with his fiancée, in the southern island resort of Ko Samui. While taking pictures of a waterfall, he tumbled and fell to his death, succumbing to "heavy loss of blood and severe brain injuries". He was 28 years old.

== Career statistics ==
Appearances and goals by national team and year
Country	Season	Competitive		Friendlies		Total		Ref
Country	Season	Apps	Goals	Apps	Goals	Apps	Goals	Ref
Czechoslovakia	1991–92	1	0	4	0	5	0	
Czechoslovakia	1992–93	5	4	1	0	6	4	
Czechoslovakia	1993–94	3	2	0	0	3	2	
Czechoslovakia	Total	9	6	5	0	14	6	
Slovakia	1993–94	—		2	2	2	2	
Slovakia	1994–95	5	2	3	2	8	4	
Slovakia	1995–96	4	1	2	0	6	1	
Slovakia	1996–97	3	3	0	0	3	3	
Slovakia	1997–98	0	0	3	0	3	0	
Slovakia	1998–99	6	2	2	0	8	2	
Slovakia	1999–2000	—		3	0	3	0	
Slovakia	Total	18	8	15	4	33	12	
Career total		27	14	20	4	47	18	

Scores and results list Czechoslovakia and Slovakia's goal tally first, score column indicates score after each Dubovský goal.

List of international goals scored by Peter Dubovský
No.	Date	Venue	Opponent	Score	Result	Competition
Czechoslovakia
1	23 September 1992	Všešportový areál, Košice, Czechoslovakia	Faroe Islands	4–0	4–0	1994 World Cup qualification
2	2 June 1993	Všešportový areál, Košice, Slovakia	Romania	3–2	5–2	1994 World Cup qualification
3	2 June 1993	Všešportový areál, Košice, Slovakia	Romania	4–2	5–2	1994 World Cup qualification
4	2 June 1993	Všešportový areál, Košice, Slovakia	Romania	5–2	5–2	1994 World Cup qualification
5	8 September 1993	Cardiff Arms Park, Cardiff, Wales	Wales	2–2	2–2	1994 World Cup qualification
6	27 October 1993	Všešportový areál, Košice, Slovakia	Cyprus	1–0	3–0	1994 World Cup qualification
Slovakia
1	20 April 1994	Tehelné pole, Bratislava, Slovakia	Croatia	1–0	4–1	Friendly
2	20 April 1994	Tehelné pole, Bratislava, Slovakia	Croatia	2–0	4–1	Friendly
3	13 November 1994	Stadionul Steaua, Bucharest, Romania	Romania	1–2	2–3	Euro 1996 qualifying
4	8 March 1995	Všešportový areál, Košice, Slovakia	Russia	1–0	2–1	Friendly
5	8 March 1995	Všešportový areál, Košice, Slovakia	Russia	2–0	2–1	Friendly
6	29 March 1995	Všešportový areál, Košice, Slovakia	Azerbaijan	3–0	4–1	Euro 1996 qualifying
7	11 October 1995	Tehelné pole, Bratislava, Slovakia	Poland	1–1	4–1	Euro 1996 qualifying
8	31 August 1996	Svangaskarð, Toftir, Faroe Islands	Faroe Islands	2–1	2–1	1998 World Cup qualification
9	22 September 1996	Tehelné pole, Bratislava, Slovakia	Malta	5–0	6–0	1998 World Cup qualification
10	23 October 1996	Tehelné pole, Bratislava, Slovakia	Faroe Islands	1–0	3–0	1998 World Cup qualification
11	5 September 1998	Lokomotíva Stadium, Košice, Slovakia	Azerbaijan	2–0	3–0	Euro 2000 qualifying
12	10 October 1998	Rheinpark Stadion, Vaduz, Liechtenstein	Liechtenstein	2–0	4–0	Euro 2000 qualifying

== Honours ==
Slovan Bratislava

- Czechoslovak First League: 1991–92

Real Madrid

- Supercopa de España: 1993
- La Liga: 1994–95

Individual

- Slovak Footballer of the Year: 1993
- Czechoslovak First League top scorer: 1991–92, 1992–93
