= Vladimír Labant =

Slovak footballer

Personal information
- Date of birth: 8 June 1974 (age 52)
- Place of birth: Čadca, Czechoslovakia
- Height: 1.89 m (6 ft 2 in)
- Position: Left-back

Youth career
- 1984–1992: Žilina

Senior career*
Years	Team	Apps	(Gls)
1992–1995	Žilina		
1993–1994	→ Banská Bystrica (loan)		
1995–1996	Košice		
1996–1997	→ Banská Bystrica (loan)'		
1997–1999	Slavia Prague	49	(1)
1999–2001	Sparta Prague	52	(5)
2002	West Ham United	13	(0)
2002–2004	Sparta Prague	25	(2)
2005	→ Admira Mödling (loan)	13	(0)
2005	Rapid Wien	8	(0)
2006	Spartak Trnava	17	(0)
Total		177+	(8+)

International career
1999–2004	Slovakia	27	(2)
- * Club domestic league appearances and goals

Vladimír Labant (born 8 June 1974) is a Slovak former professional footballer who played as a left-back. He represented the Slovakia national team.

== Club career ==
Labant was a much sought after left-back after a successful spell with Czech club Slavia Prague. He joined rivals Sparta Prague in 1999 and was touted around Europe to several teams including PSV Eindhoven of the Netherlands. He eventually moved to West Ham United for a fee just under £1 million in January 2002. He made his debut when he came on as a substitute in an FA Cup tie against Chelsea. His cross led to West Ham's equaliser from Frédéric Kanouté. He ended the 2001-02 season with 14 first team appearances for West Ham.

The following season he was shunned even as the club fell into a relegation battle. Having made just one appearance for West Ham in the 2002-03 season thus far, in a 4–0 loss at Newcastle United, he rejoined Sparta Prague on loan in December 2002, and eventually re-signed with them permanently the following summer.

Labant finished his playing career with Spartak Trnava in the Slovak Corgoň Liga.

== International career ==
Labant made 27 appearances for the senior Slovakia national team. He made his debut against Romania in a UEFA Euro 2000 qualifier on 27 March 1999, a match in which he was sent off after receiving two yellow cards. Labant's final cap came against Austria on 31 March 2004.

== Honours ==
Slavia Prague

- Czech Cup: 1998–99

Sparta Prague

- Czech First League: 1999–2000, 2000–01, 2002–03

Individual

- Slovak Footballer of the Year: 1999
