= Nazim Suleymanov =

Azerbaijani footballer (born 1965)

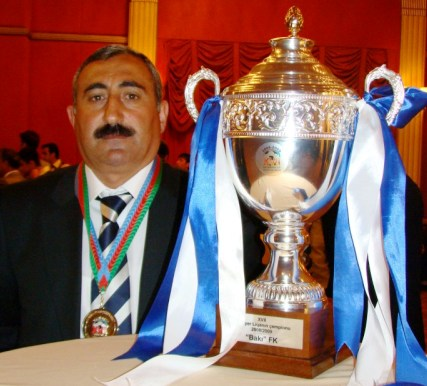

Personal information
- Full name: Nazim Hacibaba oglu Suleymanov
- Date of birth: 17 February 1965 (age 61)
- Place of birth: Sumgayit, Azerbaijan SSR, USSR
- Height: 1.79 m (5 ft 10 in)
- Position: Striker

Team information
- Current team: Khimki (U19 manager)

Youth career
- 1982: Avtomobilist Mingachevir

Senior career*
Years	Team	Apps	(Gls)
1983–1990	Neftchi Baku	177	(27)
1990	Spartak Moscow	0	(0)
1991–1996	Alania Vladikavkaz	142	(60)
1997–2000	Zhemchuzhina Sochi	67	(13)
Total		386	(100)

International career
1992–1999	Azerbaijan	24	(5)

Managerial career
- 2002: Zhemchuzhina Sochi
- 2004–2005: Khazar Lankaran
- 2009–2011: AZAL Baku
- 2012–2013: Azerbaijan (assistant)
- 2013–2014: Neftchi Baku
- 2015–2016: Azerbaijan U19
- 2018: Sumgayit
- 2023: Khimki-M
- 2023–: Khimki (U-19)
- * Club domestic league appearances and goals

Nazim Suleymanov (Azerbaijani: Nazim Süleymanov; Russian: Назим Сулейманов; born 17 February 1965) is a Soviet and Azerbaijani football coach and a former player best known as a striker for Alania Vladikavkaz in the 1990s. He is the manager of the Under-19 squad of the Russian club Khimki.

Suleymanov was the first player ever to score for Azerbaijan in international football, in a friendly against Georgia in 1992. Despite a second goal from Suleymanov and one from Vidadi Rzayev, they lost 6–3.

== International goals ==
#	Date	Venue	Opponent	Score	Result	Competition
1.	September 17, 1992	Gurjaani, Georgia	Georgia	1-1	6-3	Friendly
2.	September 17, 1992	Gurjaani, Georgia	Georgia	6-3	6-3	Friendly
3.	March 29, 1995	Košice, Slovakia	Slovakia	4-1	4–1	Euro 1996 qualification
4.	April 26, 1995	Trabzon, Turkey	Romania	1-1	1–4	Euro 1996 qualification
5.	April 5, 1997	Baku, Azerbaijan	Finland	1-2	1–2	1998 WC qualification

== Honours ==
Alania Vladikavkaz

- Russian Top League: 1995; runners-up: 1992, 1996

=== Individual ===
- Most overall goals scored for Alania Vladikavkaz: 60
- Best 33 players of the Russia Top League season, No. 3: 1992, 1993
