= Mirbağır İsayev =

Azerbaijani footballer and manager (born 1974)

Personal information
- Date of birth: 13 March 1974 (age 52)
- Place of birth: Baku, Azerbaijan SSR
- Position: Midfielder

Senior career*
Years	Team	Apps	(Gls)
1993–1995	Neftchi Baku		
1996–2000	Qarabağ		

International career
1994–1999	Azerbaijan	10	(1)

Managerial career
- 2010–2011: Absheron
- 2011: Kapaz
- 2014–2015: Azerbaijan U17
- 2016: Azerbaijan U15
- 2017: Azerbaijan U17
- * Club domestic league appearances and goals

Mirbağır İsayev (born 13 March 1974) is a retired Azerbaijani footballer.
