= Liechtenstein national football team results (1981–2019) =

The Liechtenstein national football team represents Liechtenstein in association football and is controlled by the Liechtenstein Football Association (LFV), the governing body of the sport there. It competes as a member of the Union of European Football Associations (UEFA), which encompasses the countries of Europe. Liechtenstein joined UEFA and the International Federation of Association Football (FIFA) in 1974 but did not play an official match until 1981.

Liechtenstein's first match—a 1–1 draw against Malta—took place on 14 June 1981. They played only nine official matches between 1981 and 1993, with four taking place in 1981 and the other five were each played in a different year. Their first victory came in their third match, 3–2 against Indonesia. They entered their first major international competition in 1994: the qualifying rounds for 1996 UEFA European Football Championship. Liechtenstein made its first appearance in the qualifying rounds of the FIFA World Cup during the 1998 edition.

The team has won only 16 of its 191 matches, their largest victory came on 13 October 2004 when they defeated Luxembourg by four goals to nil in the 2006 FIFA World Cup qualification tournament. The teams most recent win was on 10 October 2024 winning 1-0 against Hong Kong in a friendly. Their worst loss is an 11–1 against Macedonia in 1996. Peter Jehle holds the appearance record for Liechtenstein, having been capped 132 times since 1998. The goalscoring record is held by Mario Frick, who scored 16 times in 125 matches. As of April 2019, Liechtenstein are ranked 182nd in the FIFA World Rankings. Its highest ever ranking of 118th was achieved three times: January 2008, July 2011 and September 2011.

Contents
- 1981–1993
- 1994
- 1995
- 1996
- 1997
- 1998
- 1999
  2000
- 2001
- 2002
- 2003
- 2004
- 2005
- 2006
- 2007
- 2008
- 2009
  2010
- 2011
- 2012
- 2013
- 2014
- 2015
- 2016
- 2017
- 2018
- 2019

== List of matches ==
The coloured backgrounds denote the result of the match: – indicates Liechtenstein won the match – indicates Liechtenstein's opponent won the match – indicates the match ended in a draw	The letters next to the location indicate where the match was played: (H) – indicates the match was a home game (A) – indicates the match was an away game (N) – indicates the match was played at a neutral venue

=== 1981–1993 ===
14 June 1981 1981 President's Cup	Liechtenstein	1–1	Malta	Daejeon, South Korea (N)
	Sklarski	Report; Report	Buttigieg	Stadium: Daejeon Hanbat Sports Complex

16 June 1981 1981 President's Cup	Liechtenstein	0–2	Thailand	Jeonju, South Korea (N)
		Report	Hongkajohn 46'; Chitavanich 66'	Stadium: Jeonju Stadium

22 June 1981 1981 President's Cup	Liechtenstein	3–2	Indonesia	Jeonju, South Korea (N)
	Marxer 29', 33', 44'	Report		Stadium: Jeonju Stadium

5 October 1981 Friendly	Liechtenstein	1–0	Malaysia	Balzers, Liechtenstein (H)
	Sklarski	Report		Stadium: Sportplatz Rheinau

9 March 1982 Friendly	Liechtenstein	0–1	Switzerland	Balzers, Liechtenstein (H)
		Report	Brigger 7'	Stadium: Sportplatz Rheinau; Attendance: 4,500; Referee: Jacob Baumann (Switzerland)

6 June 1982 Friendly	Liechtenstein	2–0	China	Vaduz, Liechtenstein (H)
	Moser 28', 40'	Report		Stadium: Rheinpark Stadion; Attendance: 1,500; Referee: Franz Gachter (Switzerland)

7 June 1984 Friendly	Liechtenstein	0–6	Austria (Note: This is an official match for Liechtenstein but not for Austria.)	Vaduz, Liechtenstein (H)
		Report	Polster 36'; Messlender 40'; Prohaska 42', 70'; Keglevits 81'; Willfurth 89'	Stadium: Gemeindesportplatz; Attendance: 1,500; Referee: Jacob Baumann1,500 (Switzerland)

30 May 1990 Friendly	Liechtenstein	1–4	United States	Eschen, Liechtenstein (H)
	Marxer 11'	Report	Vermes 10'; Marcelo Balboa 53'; Wynalda 66'; Henderson 75'	Stadium: Sportpark Eschen-Mauren; Attendance: 2,400; Referee: Manfred Schlup (Switzerland)

12 March 1991 Friendly	Liechtenstein	0–6	Switzerland	Balzers, Liechtenstein (H)
		Report	Hermann 26'; Knup 27' (pen.), 33', 69'; Türkyilmaz 47'; Aeby 89'	Stadium: Sportplatz Rheinau; Attendance: 2,400; Referee: Karl-Heinz Tritschler (Germany)

26 October 1993 Friendly	Liechtenstein	0–2	Estonia	Balzers, Liechtenstein (H)
		Report	Bragin 56'; Rajala 89'	Stadium: Sportplatz Rheinau; Attendance: 1,200; Referee: Gerd Grabher (Austria)

=== 1994 ===
20 April UEFA Euro 1996 qualifying	Northern Ireland	4–1	Liechtenstein	Belfast, Northern Ireland (A)
	Quinn 5', 34'; Lomas 25'; Dowie 48'	Report	Hasler 84'	Stadium: Windsor Park; Attendance: 7,150; Referee: Roelof Luinge (Netherlands)

27 May Friendly	Switzerland	2–0	Liechtenstein	Basel, Switzerland (A)
	Herr 30'; Hottiger 65'	Report		Stadium: St. Jakob Stadium; Attendance: 13,100; Referee: Alain Hamer (Luxembourg)

7 September UEFA Euro 1996 qualifying	Liechtenstein	0–4	Austria	Eschen, Liechtenstein (H)
		Report	Polster 18', 45', 78'; Aigner 22'	Stadium: Sportpark Eschen-Mauren; Attendance: 5,800; Referee: Wieland Ziller (Germany)

12 October UEFA Euro 1996 qualifying	Republic of Ireland	4–0	Liechtenstein	Dublin, Republic of Ireland (A)
	Coyne 2', 4'; Quinn 30', 82'	Report		Stadium: Lansdowne Road; Attendance: 32,980; Referee: Bragi Bergmann (Iceland)

15 November UEFA Euro 1996 qualifying	Liechtenstein	0–1	Latvia	Eschen, Liechtenstein (H)
		Report		Stadium: Sportpark Eschen-Mauren; Attendance: 1,200; Referee: Piotr Werner (Poland)

18 December UEFA Euro 1996 qualifying	Portugal	8–0	Liechtenstein	Lisbon, Portugal (A)
	Domingos 2', 11'; Oceano 45'; João Domingos Pinto 56'; Couto 72'; Folha 74'; Alves 75', 79'	Report		Stadium: Estádio da Luz; Attendance: 22,800; Referee: Lubomír Pucek (Czech Republic)

=== 1995 ===
26 April UEFA Euro 1996 qualifying	Austria	7–0	Liechtenstein	Salzburg, Austria (A)
	Kühbauer 7'; Polster 10', 54' (pen.); Sabitzer 80'; Pürk 84'; Hütter 87', 89'	Report		Stadium: Stadion Lehen; Attendance: 5,700; Referee: Vasyl Melnychuk (Ukraine)

3 June UEFA Euro 1996 qualifying	Liechtenstein	0–0	Republic of Ireland	Eschen, Liechtenstein (H)
		Report		Stadium: Sportpark Eschen-Mauren; Attendance: 4,500; Referee: Charles Agius (Malta)

15 August UEFA Euro 1996 qualifying	Liechtenstein	0–7	Portugal	Eschen, Liechtenstein (H)
		Report	Domingos 25'; Santos 33'; Rui Costa 41', 70' (pen.); Alves 66', 73', 90'	Stadium: Sportpark Eschen-Mauren; Attendance: 3,500; Referee: Dragutin Poljak (Croatia)

6 September UEFA Euro 1996 qualifying	Latvia	1–0	Liechtenstein	Riga, Latvia (A)
	Zeiberliņš 83'	Report		Stadium: Daugava Stadium; Attendance: 3,800; Referee: Tom Henning Øvrebø (Norway)

11 October UEFA Euro 1996 qualifying	Liechtenstein	0–4	Northern Ireland	Eschen, Liechtenstein (H)
		Report	O'Neill 36'; McMahon 49'; Quinn 55'; Gray 72'	Stadium: Sportpark Eschen-Mauren; Attendance: 1,200; Referee: Ľuboš Micheľ (Slovakia)

=== 1996 ===
24 April 1998 FIFA World Cup qualification	Macedonia	3–0	Liechtenstein	Skopje, Macedonia (A)
	Milosevski 6'; Babunski 49' (pen.); Zaharievski 78'	Report		Stadium: Gradski; Attendance: 11,500; Referee: Loizos Loizou (Cyprus)

4 June Friendly	Germany	9–1	Liechtenstein	Mannheim, Germany (A)
	Möller 4', 64'; Kuntz 18', 90'; Bierhoff 22'; Ziege 38'; Sammer 48'; Kohler 53'; Klinsmann 85'	Report	Pérez 69'	Stadium: Carl-Benz-Stadion; Attendance: 26,000; Referee: Werner Müller (Switzerland)

31 August 1998 FIFA World Cup qualification	Liechtenstein	0–5	Republic of Ireland	Eschen, Liechtenstein (H)
		Report	Townsend 5'; O'Neill 9'; Quinn 12', 61'; Harte 20'	Stadium: Sportpark Eschen-Mauren; Attendance: 3,900; Referee: Syarhey Shmolik (Belarus)

9 October 1998 FIFA World Cup qualification	Lithuania	2–1	Liechtenstein	Vilnius, Lithuania (A)
	Jankauskas 43'; Narbekovas 55'	Report	H. Zech 53'	Stadium: Žalgiris Stadium; Attendance: 5,000; Referee: Xaqani Məmmədov (Azerbaijan)

9 November 1998 FIFA World Cup qualification	Liechtenstein	1–11	Macedonia	Eschen, Liechtenstein (H)
	F. Schädler 78'	Report	Glavevski 8', 12', 60'; Hristov 23'; Stojkovski 30', 43'; T.Micevski 45', 49'; Ćirić 53', 87'; V.Micevski 90'	Stadium: Sportpark Eschen-Mauren; Attendance: 2,600; Referee: Haim Lipkovich (Israel)

=== 1997 ===
29 March 1998 FIFA World Cup qualification	Romania	8–0	Liechtenstein	Bucharest, Romania (A)
	V. Moldovan 10'; Popescu 28', 30', 68', 88'; Hagi 47'; Petrescu 48'; Craioveanu 71'	Report		Stadium: Stadionul Steaua; Attendance: 2,000; Referee: Romans Lajuks (Latvia)

30 April 1998 FIFA World Cup qualification	Liechtenstein	0–2	Lithuania	Eschen, Liechtenstein (H)
		Report	Jankauskas 66'; Ražanauskas 89'	Stadium: Sportpark Eschen-Mauren; Attendance: 800; Referee: Bujar Pregia (Albania)

21 May 1998 FIFA World Cup qualification	Republic of Ireland	5–0	Liechtenstein	Dublin, Republic of Ireland (A)
	Connolly 28', 34', 41'; Cascarino 61', 80'	Report		Stadium: Lansdowne Road; Attendance: 28,575; Referee: Andrey Butenko (Russia)

20 August 1998 FIFA World Cup qualification	Liechtenstein	0–4	Iceland	Eschen, Liechtenstein (H)
		Report	Einar Daníelsson 28'; Brynjar Gunnarsson 40'; Sigurður Jónsson 62'; Tryggvi Guðmundsson 63'	Stadium: Sportpark Eschen-Mauren; Attendance: 550; Referee: Oleg Timofejev (Estonia)

6 September 1998 FIFA World Cup qualification	Liechtenstein	1–8	Romania	Eschen, Liechtenstein (H)
	M. Frick 62'	Report	V. Moldovan 5'; Craioveanu 10', 32'; Doboş 35'; D. Munteanu 43', 45', 67'; Barbu 53'	Stadium: Sportpark Eschen-Mauren; Attendance: 1,700; Referee: Alfred Micaleff (Malta)

11 October 1998 FIFA World Cup qualification	Iceland	4–0	Liechtenstein	Reykjavík, Iceland (A)
	Þórður Guðjónsson 58'; Tryggvi Guðmundsson 60'; Arnór Guðjohnsen 66'; Bjarni Guðjónsson 73'	Report		Stadium: Laugardalsvöllur; Attendance: 1,651; Referee: Alan Howells (Wales)

=== 1998 ===
2 June Friendly	Austria	6–0	Liechtenstein	Vienna, Austria (A)
	Polster 5', 90+3'; Kühbauer 27'; Stöger 68', 75'; Haas 90+1'	Report		Stadium: Ernst-Happel-Stadion; Attendance: 11,000; Referee: Bohdan Benedik (Slovakia)

2 September UEFA Euro 2000 qualifying	Romania	7–0	Liechtenstein	Bucharest, Romania (A)
	Popescu 18'; C. Munteanu 30'; Ilie 32', 45', 53'; Moldovan 56'; Haas 60' (o.g.)	Report		Stadium: Stadionul Steaua; Attendance: 3,000; Referee: Salem Prolić (Bosnia and Herzegovina)

10 October UEFA Euro 2000 qualifying	Liechtenstein	0–4	Slovakia	Vaduz, Liechtenstein (H)
		Report	Sovič 3'; Dubovský 13'; Tomaschek 36', 61'	Stadium: Rheinpark Stadion; Attendance: 1,840; Referee: Vladimir Antonov (Moldova)

14 October UEFA Euro 2000 qualifying	Liechtenstein	2–1	Azerbaijan	Vaduz, Liechtenstein (H)
	M. Frick 48'; Telser 49'	Report	Gurbanov 59'	Stadium: Rheinpark Stadion; Attendance: 1,450; Referee: Herbie Barr (Northern Ireland)

=== 1999 ===
27 March UEFA Euro 2000 qualifying	Hungary	5–0	Liechtenstein	Budapest, Hungary (A)
	J. Sebők 17'; V. Sebők 33', 42', 86' (pen.); Illés 74'	Report		Stadium: Üllői úti Stadion; Attendance: 9,534; Referee: Kostas Kapitanis (Cyprus)

31 March UEFA Euro 2000 qualifying	Liechtenstein	0–5	Portugal	Vaduz, Liechtenstein (H)
		Report	Rui Costa 16' (pen.), 79'; Figo 49'; Paulo Madeira 54', 60'	Stadium: Rheinpark Stadion; Attendance: 3,548; Referee: Gylfi Orrason (Iceland)

5 June UEFA Euro 2000 qualifying	Azerbaijan	4–0	Liechtenstein	Baku, Azerbaijan (A)
	Gurbanov 16'; Liçkin 42'; Tagizade 60'; İsayev 73'	Report		Stadium: Tofiq Bahramov Republican Stadium; Attendance: 8,500; Referee: Knud Stadsgaard (Denmark)

9 June UEFA Euro 2000 qualifying	Portugal	8–0	Liechtenstein	Coimbra, Portugal (A)
	Sá Pinto 29', 45', 52'; João Pinto 40', 59', 67'; Rui Costa 80', 90' (pen.)	Report		Stadium: Estádio Cidade de Coimbra; Attendance: 14,020; Referee: Dietmar Drabek (Austria)

18 August Friendly	Liechtenstein	0–0	Bosnia and Herzegovina	Vaduz, Liechtenstein (H)
		Report		Stadium: Rheinpark Stadion; Attendance: 1,300; Referee: Massimo Busacca (Switzerland)

4 September UEFA Euro 2000 qualifying	Liechtenstein	0–0	Hungary	Vaduz, Liechtenstein (H)
		Report		Stadium: Rheinpark Stadion; Attendance: 1,650; Referee: Sten Kaldma (Estonia)

8 September UEFA Euro 2000 qualifying	Slovakia	2–0	Liechtenstein	Dubnica nad Váhom, Slovakia (A)
	S. Németh 4'; Karhan 55'	Report		Stadium: Kerametal Stadion; Attendance: 3,052; Referee: Andreas Georgiou (Cyprus)

9 October UEFA Euro 2000 qualifying	Liechtenstein	0–3	Romania	Vaduz, Liechtenstein (H)
		Report	Roşu 26'; Ganea 65', 73'	Stadium: Rheinpark Stadion; Attendance: 2,200; Referee: Andrey Butenko (Russia)

=== 2000 ===
26 April Friendly	Liechtenstein	0–1	Faroe Islands	Vaduz, Liechtenstein (H)
		Report	Arge 71'	Stadium: Rheinpark Stadion; Attendance: 950; Referee: Andreas Schluchter (Switzerland)

7 June Friendly	Germany	8–2	Liechtenstein	Freiburg im Breisgau, Germany (A)
	Bierhoff 1'; Scholl 31'; Bode 65'; Hasler 80' (o.g.); Kirsten 81', 86'; Jancker 84', 88'	Report	Stocklasa 17'; M. Frick 56'	Stadium: Dreisamstadion; Attendance: 24,000; Referee: Konrad Plautz (Austria)

3 September 2002 FIFA World Cup qualification	Israel	2–0	Liechtenstein	Ramat Gan, Israel (A)
	Mizrahi 1'; Balili 80'	Report		Stadium: Ramat Gan Stadium; Attendance: 19,000; Referee: Richard O'Hanlon (Republic of Ireland)

7 October 2002 FIFA World Cup qualification	Liechtenstein	0–1	Austria	Vaduz, Liechtenstein (H)
		Report	Flögel 20'	Stadium: Rheinpark Stadion; Attendance: 3,548; Referee: John Rowbotham (Scotland)

=== 2001 ===
28 February Friendly	Liechtenstein	0–2	Latvia	Vaduz, Liechtenstein (H)
		Report	Miholaps 63'; Verpakovskis 66'	Stadium: Rheinpark Stadion; Attendance: 700; Referee: Markus Nobs (Switzerland)

24 March 2002 FIFA World Cup qualification	Spain	5–0	Liechtenstein	Alicante, Spain (A)
	Helguera 20'; Mendieta 36', 82'; Hierro 55' (pen.); Raúl 67'	Report		Stadium: Estadio José Rico Pérez; Attendance: 29,900; Referee: Darko Čeferin (Slovenia)

28 March 2002 FIFA World Cup qualification	Liechtenstein	0–3	Bosnia and Herzegovina	Vaduz, Liechtenstein (H)
		Report	Barbarez 10', 72'; Hota 89'	Stadium: Rheinpark Stadion; Attendance: 3,400; Referee: Andrejs Sipailo (Latvia)

25 April 2002 FIFA World Cup qualification	Austria	2–0	Liechtenstein	Innsbruck, Austria (A)
	Glieder 44'; Flögel 75'	Report		Stadium: Tivoli-Neu; Attendance: 13,060; Referee: David Malcolm (Northern Ireland)

2 June 2002 FIFA World Cup qualification	Liechtenstein	0–3	Israel	Vaduz, Liechtenstein (H)
		Report	Revivo 3'; Tal 7'; Nimni 18'	Stadium: Rheinpark Stadion; Attendance: 1,650; Referee: Lassin Isaksen (Faroe Islands)

5 September 2002 FIFA World Cup qualification	Liechtenstein	0–2	Spain	Vaduz, Liechtenstein (H)
		Report	Raúl 19'; Nadal 82'	Stadium: Rheinpark Stadion; Attendance: 4,800; Referee: Ivan Dobrinov (Bulgaria)

7 October 2002 FIFA World Cup qualification	Bosnia and Herzegovina	5–0	Liechtenstein	Zenica, Bosnia and Herzegovina (A)
	Konjić 33'; Baljić 45' (pen.), 82' (pen.); Šabić 69'; Dodik 85'	Report		Stadium: Bilino Polje Stadium; Attendance: 6,000; Referee: John McDermott (Republic of Ireland)

=== 2002 ===
13 February Friendly	Liechtenstein	0–1	Faroe Islands	Pegeia, Cyprus (N)
		Report	Arge 24'	Stadium: Peyia Municipal Stadium; Attendance: 50; Referee: Panayiotis Gerasimou (Cyprus)

27 March Friendly	Liechtenstein	0–0	Northern Ireland	Vaduz, Liechtenstein (H)
		Report		Stadium: Rheinpark Stadion; Attendance: 1,080; Referee: René Rogalla (Switzerland)

17 April Friendly	Luxembourg	3–3	Liechtenstein	Hesperange, Luxembourg (A)
	Strasser 39'; Christophe 69'; Cardoni 83'	Report	Stocklasa 6', 26', 37'	Stadium: Stade Alphonse Theis; Attendance: 1,653; Referee: Jan Wegereef (Netherlands)

21 August Friendly	Faroe Islands	3–1	Liechtenstein	Tórshavn, Faroe Islands (A)
	Jacobsen 61'; Benjaminsen 71'; Johnsson 83'	Report	M. Frick 45' (pen.)	Stadium: Tórsvøllur; Attendance: 3,200; Referee: Gylfi Orrason (Iceland)

8 September UEFA Euro 2004 qualifying	Liechtenstein	1–1	Macedonia	Vaduz, Liechtenstein (H)
	Stocklasa 90'	Report	Hristov 8'	Stadium: Rheinpark Stadion; Attendance: 2,650; Referee: Vitaliy Godulyan (Ukraine)

16 October UEFA Euro 2004 qualifying	Turkey	5–0	Liechtenstein	Istanbul, Turkey (A)
	Okan 7'; Davala 14'; Mansız 23'; Akın 81', 90'	Report		Stadium: Ali Sami Yen Stadium; Attendance: 18,000; Referee: Yuriy Baskakov (Russia)

=== 2003 ===
29 March UEFA Euro 2004 qualifying	Liechtenstein	0–2	England	Vaduz, Liechtenstein (H)
		Report	Owen 28'; Beckham 53'	Stadium: Rheinpark Stadion; Attendance: 3,548; Referee: Giorgos Kasnaferis (Greece)

2 April UEFA Euro 2004 qualifying	Slovakia	4–0	Liechtenstein	Trnava, Slovakia (A)
	Reiter 19'; Németh 50', 64'; Janočko 89'	Report		Stadium: Štadión Antona Malatinského; Attendance: 75; Referee: Darko Čeferin (Slovenia)

30 April Friendly	Liechtenstein	1–0	Saudi Arabia	Vaduz, Liechtenstein (H)
	Burgmeier 22'	Report		Stadium: Rheinpark Stadion; Attendance: 1,200; Referee: René Rogalla (Switzerland)

7 June UEFA Euro 2004 qualifying	Macedonia	3–1	Liechtenstein	Skopje, Macedonia (A)
	Sedloski 39' (pen.); Krstev 52'; Stojkov 82'	Report	Beck 20'	Stadium: Gradski Stadium; Attendance: 5,200; Referee: Jaroslav Jara (Czech Republic)

20 August Friendly	Liechtenstein	2–2	San Marino	Vaduz, Liechtenstein (H)
	M. Frick 16'; Burgmeier 23'	Report	Gasperoni 39'; Ciacci 45'	Stadium: Rheinpark Stadion; Attendance: 850; Referee: Guido Wildhaber (Switzerland)

6 September UEFA Euro 2004 qualifying	Liechtenstein	0–3	Turkey	Vaduz, Liechtenstein (H)
		Report	Metin 14'; Okan 41'; Hakan Sükür 50'	Stadium: Rheinpark Stadion; Attendance: 3,548; Referee: Dick van Egmond (Netherlands)

10 September UEFA Euro 2004 qualifying	England	2–0	Liechtenstein	Manchester, England (A)
	Owen 46'; Rooney 52'	Report		Stadium: Old Trafford; Attendance: 64,931; Referee: Knud Erik Fisker (Denmark)

11 October UEFA Euro 2004 qualifying	Liechtenstein	0–2	Slovakia	Vaduz, Liechtenstein (H)
		Report	Vittek 40', 56'	Stadium: Rheinpark Stadion; Attendance: 800; Referee: Jouni Hyytiä (Finland)

=== 2004 ===
28 April Friendly	San Marino	1–0	Liechtenstein	Serravalle, San Marino (A)
	Selva 6'	Report		Stadium: Stadio Olimpico; Attendance: 200; Referee: Lawrence Sammut (Malta)

3 June Friendly	Liechtenstein	0–2	Greece	Vaduz, Liechtenstein (H)
		Report	Vryzas 24'; Charisteas 89'	Stadium: Rheinpark Stadion; Attendance: 3,289; Referee: Nicole Petignat (Switzerland)

6 June Friendly	Switzerland	1–0	Liechtenstein	Zürich, Switzerland (A)
	Gygax 90+1'	Report		Stadium: Hardturm; Attendance: 10,200; Referee: Dietmar Drabek (Austria)

18 August 2006 FIFA World Cup qualification	Liechtenstein	1–2	Estonia	Vaduz, Liechtenstein (H)
	D'Elia 49'	Report	Viikmäe 34'; Lindpere 80'	Stadium: Rheinpark Stadion; Attendance: 912; Referee: Emil Božinovski (Macedonia)

3 September Friendly	Netherlands	3–0	Liechtenstein	Utrecht, Netherlands (A)
	Bommel 23'; Ooijer 56'; Landzaat 78'	Report		Stadium: Stadion Galgenwaard; Attendance: 15,000; Referee: Iain Brines (Scotland)

8 September 2006 FIFA World Cup qualification	Slovakia	7–0	Liechtenstein	Bratislava, Slovakia (A)
	Vittek 15', 59', 81'; Karhan 42'; Németh 84'; Mintál 85'; Zabavník 90+2'	Report		Stadium: Tehelné pole Attendance: 5,620; Referee: Dejan Delević (Serbia and Montenegro)

9 October 2006 FIFA World Cup qualification	Liechtenstein	2–2	Portugal	Vaduz, Liechtenstein (H)
	Burgmeier 48'; T. Beck 76'	Report	Pauleta 23'; Hasler 39' (o.g.)	Stadium: Rheinpark Stadion; Attendance: 3,548; Referee: Novo Panić (Bosnia and Herzegovina)

13 October 2006 FIFA World Cup qualification	Luxembourg	0–4	Liechtenstein	Luxembourg City, Luxembourg (A)
		Report	Stocklasa 41'; Burgmeier 44', 85'; M. Frick 57' (pen.)	Stadium: Stade Josy Barthel; Attendance: 3,478; Referee: Jaroslav Jara (Czech Republic)

17 November 2006 FIFA World Cup qualification	Liechtenstein	1–3	Latvia	Vaduz, Liechtenstein (H)
	M. Frick 32'	Report	Verpakovskis 7'; Zemļinskis 57'; Prohorenkovs 89'	Stadium: Rheinpark Stadion; Attendance: 1,460; Referee: Zsolt Szabó (Hungary)

=== 2005 ===
26 March 2006 FIFA World Cup qualification	Liechtenstein	1–2	Russia	Vaduz, Liechtenstein (H)
	T. Beck 40'	Report	Kerzhakov 23'; Karyaka 37'	Stadium: Rheinpark Stadion; Attendance: 3,300; Referee: Espen Berntsen (Norway)

4 June 2006 FIFA World Cup qualification	Estonia	2–0	Liechtenstein	Tallinn, Estonia (A)
	Stepanov 27'; Oper 57'	Report		Stadium: A. Le Coq Arena; Attendance: 3,000; Referee: Mark Whitby (Wales)

8 June 2006 FIFA World Cup qualification	Latvia	1–0	Liechtenstein	Riga, Latvia (A)
	Bleidelis 17'	Report		Stadium: Skonto Stadium; Attendance: 8,000; Referee: Jonas Eriksson (Sweden)

17 August 2006 FIFA World Cup qualification	Liechtenstein	0–0	Slovakia	Vaduz, Liechtenstein (H)
		Report		Stadium: Rheinpark Stadion; Attendance: 1,150; Referee: Bertrand Layec (France)

3 September 2006 FIFA World Cup qualification	Russia	2–0	Liechtenstein	Moscow, Russia (A)
	Kerzhakov 27', 66'	Report		Stadium: Lokomotiv Stadium; Attendance: 18,123; Referee: Jouni Hyytiä (Finland)

7 September 2006 FIFA World Cup qualification	Liechtenstein	3–0	Luxembourg	Vaduz, Liechtenstein (H)
	M. Frick 38'; Fischer 77'; T. Beck 92'	Report		Stadium: Rheinpark Stadion; Attendance: 2,300; Referee: Damir Skomina (Slovenia)

8 October 2006 FIFA World Cup qualification	Portugal	2–1	Liechtenstein	Aveiro, Portugal (A)
	Pauleta 48'; Gomes 85'	Report	Fischer 32'	Stadium: Estádio Municipal de Aveiro; Attendance: 30,900; Referee: Grzegorz Gilewski (Poland)

12 November Friendly	Liechtenstein	1–2	Macedonia	Vaduz, Liechtenstein (H)
	D'Elia 33'	Report	Baldovaliev 81'; Ilijoski 90+3'	Stadium: Rheinpark Stadion; Attendance: 1,350; Referee: Markus Nobs (Switzerland)

=== 2006 ===
2 June Friendly	Liechtenstein	0–1	Togo	Vaduz, Liechtenstein (H)
		Report	Kader 55'	Stadium: Rheinpark Stadion; Attendance: 2,700; Referee: Robert Schörgenhofer (Austria)

7 June Friendly	Liechtenstein	1–3	Australia	Ulm, Germany (N)
	Neill 8' (o.g.)	Report	Sterjovski 20'; Kennedy 75'; Aloisi 83'	Stadium: Donaustadion; Attendance: 7,000; Referee: Wolfgang Stark (Germany)

16 August Friendly	Liechtenstein	0–3	Switzerland	Vaduz, Liechtenstein (H)
		Report	Frei 11', 51' (pen.); Margairaz 65'	Stadium: Rheinpark Stadion; Attendance: 4,837; Referee: Bernhard Brugger (Austria)

2 September UEFA Euro 2008 qualifying	Spain	4–0	Liechtenstein	Badajoz, Spain (A)
	Torres 20'; Villa 45', 62'; L. García 66'	Report		Stadium: Estadio Nuevo Vivero; Attendance: 12,400; Referee: Emil Božinovski (Macedonia)

6 September UEFA Euro 2008 qualifying	Sweden	3–1	Liechtenstein	Gothenburg, Sweden (A)
	Allbäck 2', 69'; Rosenberg 89'	Report	M. Frick 27'	Stadium: Ullevi; Attendance: 17,735; Referee: Viaceslav Banari (Moldova)

6 October Friendly	Liechtenstein	1–2	Austria	Vaduz, Liechtenstein (H)
	M. Frick 68'	Report	Garics 77'; Prager 84'	Stadium: Rheinpark Stadion; Attendance: 3,750; Referee: René Rogalla (Switzerland)

11 October UEFA Euro 2008 qualifying	Liechtenstein	0–4	Denmark	Vaduz, Liechtenstein (H)
		Report	D. Jensen 29'; Gravgaard 32'; Tomasson 51', 64'	Stadium: Rheinpark Stadion; Attendance: 2,700; Referee: Ceri Richards (Wales)

14 November Friendly	Wales	4–0	Liechtenstein	Wrexham, Wales (A)
	Koumas 9', 15'; Bellamy 76'; Llewellyn 89'	Report		Stadium: Racecourse Ground; Attendance: 8,752; Referee: Luc Wilmes (Luxembourg)

=== 2007 ===
24 March UEFA Euro 2008 qualifying	Liechtenstein	1–4	Northern Ireland	Vaduz, Liechtenstein (H)
	Burgmeier 90+1'	Report	Healy 52', 75', 83'; McCann 90+2'	Stadium: Rheinpark Stadion; Attendance: 4,340; Referee: Oleh Oriekhov (Ukraine)

28 March UEFA Euro 2008 qualifying	Liechtenstein	1–0	Latvia	Vaduz, Liechtenstein (H)
	M. Frick 17'	Report		Stadium: Rheinpark Stadion; Attendance: 1,680; Referee: Serge Gumienny (Belgium)

2 June UEFA Euro 2008 qualifying	Iceland	1–1	Liechtenstein	Reykjavík, Iceland (A)
	Brynjar Gunnarsson 27'	Report	Rohrer 69'	Stadium: Laugardalsvöllur; Attendance: 5,139; Referee: Sten Kaldma (Estonia)

6 June UEFA Euro 2008 qualifying	Liechtenstein	0–2	Spain	Vaduz, Liechtenstein (H)
		Report	Villa 8', 14'	Stadium: Rheinpark Stadion; Attendance: 5,739; Referee: Nikolai Vladimirovich Ivanov (Russia)

22 August UEFA Euro 2008 qualifying	Northern Ireland	3–1	Liechtenstein	Belfast, Northern Ireland (A)
	Healy 5', 35'; Lafferty 56'	Report	M. Frick 89'	Stadium: Windsor Park; Attendance: 20,332; Referee: Radek Matějek (Czech Republic)

12 September UEFA Euro 2008 qualifying	Denmark	4–0	Liechtenstein	Aarhus, Denmark (A)
	Nordstrand 3', 36'; M. Laursen 12'; Tomasson 18'	Report		Stadium: NRGi Park; Attendance: 20,005; Referee: Mark Clattenburg (England)

13 October UEFA Euro 2008 qualifying	Liechtenstein	0–3	Sweden	Vaduz, Liechtenstein (H)
		Report	Ljungberg 19'; Wilhelmsson 29'; A. Svensson 56'	Stadium: Rheinpark Stadion; Attendance: 4,131; Referee: Paolo Dondarini (Italy)

17 October UEFA Euro 2008 qualifying	Liechtenstein	3–0	Iceland	Vaduz, Liechtenstein (H)
	M. Frick 28'; Beck 80', 82'	Report		Stadium: Rheinpark Stadion; Attendance: 2,589; Referee: Hristoforos Zografos (Greece)

17 November UEFA Euro 2008 qualifying	Latvia	4–1	Liechtenstein	Riga, Latvia (A)
	Karlsons 14'; Verpakovskis 30'; Laizāns 63'; Višņakovs 87'	Report	Zirnis 13' (o.g.)	Stadium: Skonto Stadium; Attendance: 4,800; Referee: Svein Oddvar Moen (Norway)

=== 2008 ===
26 March Friendly	Malta	7–1	Liechtenstein	Attard, Malta (A)
	Mifsud 2' (pen.), 17', 21' (pen.), 59', 69'; Pace 35'; Said 86'	Report	Burgmeier 51'	Stadium: Ta' Qali National Stadium; Attendance: 1,600; Referee: Willie Collum (Scotland)

30 May Friendly	Switzerland	3–0	Liechtenstein	St. Gallen, Switzerland (A)
	Frei 24', 31'; Vonlanthen 68'	Report		Stadium: AFG Arena; Attendance: 18,000; Referee: Olivier Thual (France)

20 August Friendly	Albania	2–0	Liechtenstein	Tirana, Albania (A)
	Hyka 1'; Kapllani 18'	Report		Stadium: Qemal Stafa Stadium; Attendance: 1,500; Referee: Mario Vlk (Slovakia)

6 September 2010 FIFA World Cup qualification	Liechtenstein	0–6	Germany	Vaduz, Liechtenstein (H)
		Report	Podolski 21', 48'; Rolfes 64'; Schweinsteiger 65'; Hitzlsperger 75'; Westermann 86'	Stadium: Rheinpark Stadion; Attendance: 6,127; Referee: Duarte Gomes (Portugal)

10 September 2010 FIFA World Cup qualification	Azerbaijan	0–0	Liechtenstein	Baku, Azerbaijan (A)
		Report		Stadium: Tofiq Bahramov Republican Stadium; Attendance: 26,000; Referee: Tsvetan Georgiev (Bulgaria)

11 October 2010 FIFA World Cup qualification	Wales	2–0	Liechtenstein	Cardiff, Wales (A)
	Edwards 42'; M. Frick 80' (o.g.)	Report		Stadium: Millennium Stadium; Attendance: 13,356; Referee: Thomas Vejlgaard (Denmark)

19 November Friendly	Slovakia	4–0	Liechtenstein	Žilina, Slovakia (A)
	Hamšík 43', 72'; Vittek 75'; Jež 90'	Report		Stadium: Štadión pod Dubňom; Attendance: 2,010; Referee: Oleh Oriekhov (Ukraine)

=== 2009 ===
11 February Friendly	Liechtenstein	0–2	Iceland	La Manga, Spain (N)
		Report	Arnór Smárason 28'; Eiður Guðjohnsen 47'	Stadium: La Manga Stadium; Attendance: 150; Referee: Petur Reinert (Faroe Islands)

28 March 2010 FIFA World Cup qualification	Germany	4–0	Liechtenstein	Leipzig, Germany (A)
	Ballack 4'; Jansen 9'; Schweinsteiger 48'; Podolski 50'	Report		Stadium: Zentralstadion; Attendance: 43,368; Referee: Ihor Ishchenko (Ukraine)

1 April 2010 FIFA World Cup qualification	Liechtenstein	0–1	Russia	Vaduz, Liechtenstein (H)
		Report	Zyryanov 38'	Stadium: Rheinpark Stadion; Attendance: 5,679; Referee: David McKeon (Republic of Ireland)

6 June 2010 FIFA World Cup qualification	Finland	2–1	Liechtenstein	Helsinki, Finland (A)
	Forssell 33'; Johansson 71'	Report	M. Frick 13'	Stadium: Helsinki Olympic Stadium; Attendance: 20,319; Referee: Libor Kovařík (Czech Republic)

12 August Friendly	Liechtenstein	0–3	Portugal	Vaduz, Liechtenstein (H)
		Report	Almeida 15', 26'; Raul Meireles 23'	Stadium: Rheinpark Stadion; Attendance: 5,525; Referee: Carlo Bertolini (Switzerland)

5 September 2010 FIFA World Cup qualification	Russia	3–0	Liechtenstein	Saint Petersburg, Russia (A)
	V. Berezutski 17'; Pavlyuchenko 40' (pen.), 45+1' (pen.)	Report		Stadium: Petrovsky Stadium; Attendance: 20,500; Referee: Augustus Constantin (Romania)

9 September 2010 FIFA World Cup qualification	Liechtenstein	1–1	Finland	Vaduz, Liechtenstein (H)
	Polverino 75'	Report	Litmanen 74' (pen.)	Stadium: Rheinpark Stadion; Attendance: 3,132; Referee: Novo Panić (Bosnia and Herzegovina)

10 October 2010 FIFA World Cup qualification	Liechtenstein	0–2	Azerbaijan	Vaduz, Liechtenstein (H)
		Report	Javadov 55'; Məmmədov 82'	Stadium: Rheinpark Stadion; Attendance: 1,635; Referee: Pavle Radovanović (Montenegro)

14 October 2010 FIFA World Cup qualification	Liechtenstein	0–2	Wales	Vaduz, Liechtenstein (H)
		Report	Vaughan 16'; Ramsey 80'	Stadium: Rheinpark Stadion; Attendance: 1,858; Referee: Sten Kaldma (Estonia)

14 November Friendly	Croatia	5–0	Liechtenstein	Vinkovci, Croatia (A)
	Bilić 1', 49'; Srna 10'; Eduardo 23', 47'	Report		Stadium: Stadion HNK Cibalia; Attendance: 10,000; Referee: Mihály Fábián (Hungary)

=== 2010 ===
11 August Friendly	Iceland	1–1	Liechtenstein	Reykjavík, Iceland (A)
	Rúrik Gíslason 20'	Report	Stocklasa 69'	Stadium: Laugardalsvöllur; Attendance: 3,327; Referee: Anthony Buttimer (Republic of Ireland)

3 September UEFA Euro 2012 qualifying	Liechtenstein	0–4	Spain	Vaduz, Liechtenstein (H)
		Report	Torres 18', 54'; Villa 26'; Silva 62'	Stadium: Rheinpark Stadion; Attendance: 6,127; Referee: Bülent Yıldırım (Turkey)

7 September UEFA Euro 2012 qualifying	Scotland	2–1	Liechtenstein	Glasgow, Scotland (A)
	Miller 62'; McManus 90+7'	Report	M. Frick 46'	Stadium: Hampden Park; Attendance: 37,050; Referee: Viktor Shvetsov (Ukraine)

12 October UEFA Euro 2012 qualifying	Liechtenstein	0–2	Czech Republic	Vaduz, Liechtenstein (H)
		Report	Necid 12'; V. Kadlec 29'	Stadium: Rheinpark Stadion; Attendance: 2,555; Referee: Stanislav Sukhina (Russia)

17 November Friendly	Estonia	1–1	Liechtenstein	Tallinn, Estonia (A)
	Vassiljev 57' (pen.)	Report	M. Frick 35'	Stadium: A. Le Coq Arena; Attendance: 1,909; Referee: Aleksandr Gvardis (Russia)

=== 2011 ===
9 February Friendly	San Marino	0–1	Liechtenstein	Serravalle, San Marino (A)
		Report	Polverino 57'	Stadium: Stadio Olimpico; Attendance: 147; Referee: Luca Banti (Italy)

29 March UEFA Euro 2012 qualifying	Czech Republic	2–0	Liechtenstein	České Budějovice, Czech Republic (A)
	Baroš 3'; M. Kadlec 70'	Report		Stadium: Stadion Střelecký ostrov Attendance: 6,600; Referee: Ovidiu Hațegan (Romania)

3 June UEFA Euro 2012 qualifying	Liechtenstein	2–0	Lithuania	Vaduz, Liechtenstein (H)
	Erne 7'; Polverino 36'	Report		Stadium: Rheinpark Stadion; Attendance: 1,886; Referee: Artyom Kuchin (Kazakhstan)

10 August Friendly	Liechtenstein	1–2	Switzerland	Vaduz, Liechtenstein (H)
	Ritzberger 51'	Report	Derdiyok 15'; Stocklasa 34' (o.g.)	Stadium: Rheinpark Stadion; Attendance: 5,444; Referee: René Eisner (Austria)

2 September UEFA Euro 2012 qualifying	Lithuania	0–0	Liechtenstein	Kaunas, Lithuania (A)
		Report		Stadium: Darius and Girėnas Stadium; Attendance: 3,500; Referee: Ken Henry Johnsen (Norway)

6 September UEFA Euro 2012 qualifying	Spain	6–0	Liechtenstein	Logroño, Spain (A)
	Negredo 34', 37'; Xavi 44'; Ramos 52'; Villa 60', 79'	Report		Stadium: Estadio Las Gaunas; Attendance: 15,660; Referee: Harald Lechner (Austria)

8 October UEFA Euro 2012 qualifying	Liechtenstein	0–1	Scotland	Vaduz, Liechtenstein (H)
		Report	Mackail-Smith 32'	Stadium: Rheinpark Stadion; Attendance: 5,636; Referee: Tom Harald Hagen (Norway)

11 November Friendly	Hungary	5–0	Liechtenstein	Budapest, Hungary (A)
	Priskin 10', 20'; Dzsudzsák 76'; Koman 79'; Feczesin 89'	Report		Stadium: Ferenc Puskás Stadium; Attendance: 20,000; Referee: Cristian Balaj (Romania)

=== 2012 ===
29 February Friendly	Malta	2–1	Liechtenstein	Attard, Malta (A)
	Mifsud 54', 63'	Report	Büchel 48'	Stadium: Ta' Qali National Stadium; Attendance: 2,300; Referee: Mark Whitby (Wales)

14 August Friendly	Liechtenstein	1–0	Andorra	Vaduz, Liechtenstein (H)
	Hasler 45+1'	Report		Stadium: Rheinpark Stadion; Attendance: 847; Referee: Stephan Klossner (Switzerland)

7 September 2014 FIFA World Cup qualification	Liechtenstein	1–8	Bosnia and Herzegovina	Vaduz, Liechtenstein (H)
	Christen 60'	Report	Misimović 26', 31'; Ibišević 33', 39', 82'; Džeko 46', 64', 80'	Stadium: Rheinpark Stadion; Attendance: 5,900; Referee: Marco Borg (Malta)

11 September 2014 FIFA World Cup qualification	Slovakia	2–0	Liechtenstein	Bratislava, Slovakia (A)
	Sapara 37'; Jakubko 79'	Report		Stadium: Štadión Pasienky; Attendance: 4,326; Referee: Simon Lee Evans (Wales)

12 October 2014 FIFA World Cup qualification	Liechtenstein	0–2	Lithuania	Vaduz, Liechtenstein (H)
		Report	Česnauskis 50', 74'	Stadium: Rheinpark Stadion; Attendance: 1,112; Referee: Slavko Vinčić (Slovenia)

16 October 2014 FIFA World Cup qualification	Latvia	2–0	Liechtenstein	Riga, Latvia (A)
	Kamešs 29'; Gauračs 77'	Report		Stadium: Skonto Stadium; Attendance: 4,073; Referee: István Kovács (Romania)

14 November Friendly	Liechtenstein	0–1	Malta	Vaduz, Liechtenstein (H)
		Report	Caruana 38'	Stadium: Rheinpark Stadion; Attendance: 550; Referee: Nikolaj Hänni (Switzerland)

=== 2013 ===
6 February Friendly	Azerbaijan	1–0	Liechtenstein	Dubai, United Arab Emirates (N)
	Javadov 75' (pen.)	Report		Stadium: Zabeel Stadium; Attendance: 67; Referee: Abdulla Al Zaabi (United Arab Emirates)

22 March 2014 FIFA World Cup qualification	Liechtenstein	1–1	Latvia	Vaduz, Liechtenstein (H)
	Polverino 17'	Report	Cauņa 30'	Stadium: Rheinpark Stadion; Attendance: 1,150; Referee: Kevin Clancy (Scotland)

4 June Friendly	Poland	2–0	Liechtenstein	Kraków, Poland (A)
	Sobiech 53'; Rybus 72'	Report		Stadium: Stadion Cracovii; Attendance: 6,000; Referee: Sergei Karasev (Russia)

7 June 2014 FIFA World Cup qualification	Liechtenstein	1–1	Slovakia	Vaduz, Liechtenstein (H)
	Büchel 13'	Report	Ďurica 73'	Stadium: Rheinpark Stadion; Attendance: 1,623; Referee: Markus Strömbergsson (Sweden)

14 August Friendly	Liechtenstein	2–3	Croatia	Vaduz, Liechtenstein (H)
	Christen 31'; Polverino 71'	Report	Eduardo 20', 86'; Rebić 68'	Stadium: Rheinpark Stadion; Attendance: 2,800; Referee: Amhof (Switzerland)

6 September 2014 FIFA World Cup qualification	Liechtenstein	0–1	Greece	Vaduz, Liechtenstein (H)
		Report	Mitroglou 72'	Stadium: Rheinpark Stadion; Attendance: 2,680; Referee: Stanislav Todorov (Bulgaria)

10 September 2014 FIFA World Cup qualification	Lithuania	2–0	Liechtenstein	Marijampolė, Lithuania (A)
	Matulevičius 18'; Kijanskas 40'	Report		Stadium: Sūduva Stadium; Attendance: 1,955; Referee: Lasha Silagava (Georgia)

11 October 2014 FIFA World Cup qualification	Bosnia and Herzegovina	4–1	Liechtenstein	Zenica, Bosnia and Herzegovina (A)
	Džeko 27', 39'; Misimović 34'; Ibišević 38'	Report	Hasler 61'	Stadium: Bilino Polje Stadium; Attendance: 11,200; Referee: Richard Liesveld (Netherlands)

15 October 2014 FIFA World Cup qualification	Greece	2–0	Liechtenstein	Piraeus, Greece (A)
	Salpingidis 7'; Karagounis 81'	Report		Stadium: Karaiskakis Stadium; Attendance: 16,086; Referee: Libor Kovařík (Czech Republic)

19 November Friendly	Liechtenstein	0–3	Estonia	Vaduz, Liechtenstein (H)
		Report	Zenjov 45+1'; Anier 61', 63'	Stadium: Rheinpark Stadion; Attendance: 684; Referee: Chris Reisch (Luxembourg)

=== 2014 ===
5 March Friendly	Georgia	2–0	Liechtenstein	Tbilisi, Georgia (A)
	Chanturia 25'; Ananidze 46' (pen.)	Report		Stadium: Mikheil Meskhi Stadium; Attendance: 6,000; Referee: Andris Treimanis (Latvia)

21 May Friendly	Liechtenstein	1–5	Belarus	Vaduz, Liechtenstein (H)
	Burgmeier 78'	Report	Gordeichuk 13'; Kislyak 15'; Krivets 23'; Savitski 58', 67'	Stadium: Rheinpark Stadion; Attendance: 750; Referee: Laurent Kopriwa (Luxembourg)

4 September Friendly	Bosnia and Herzegovina	3–0	Liechtenstein	Tuzla, Bosnia and Herzegovina (A)
	Ibišević 2', 14'; Džeko 24'	Report		Stadium: Tušanj City Stadium; Attendance: 8,000; Referee: Danilo Grujić (Serbia)

8 September UEFA Euro 2016 qualifying	Russia	4–0	Liechtenstein	Khimki, Russia (A)
	M. Büchel 4' (o.g.); Burgmeier 50' (o.g.); Kombarov 54' (pen.); Dzyuba 65'	Report		Stadium: Arena Khimki; Attendance: 11,236; Referee: Sébastien Delferière (Belgium)

9 October UEFA Euro 2016 qualifying	Liechtenstein	0–0	Montenegro	Vaduz, Liechtenstein (H)
		Report		Stadium: Rheinpark Stadion; Attendance: 2,790; Referee: Simon Lee Evans (Wales)

12 October UEFA Euro 2016 qualifying	Sweden	2–0	Liechtenstein	Solna, Sweden (A)
	Zengin 34'; Durmaz 46'	Report		Stadium: Friends Arena; Attendance: 22,528; Referee: Gediminas Mažeika (Lithuania)

15 November UEFA Euro 2016 qualifying	Moldova	0–1	Liechtenstein	Chișinău, Moldova (A)
		Report	Burgmeier 74'	Stadium: Zimbru Stadium; Attendance: 6,843; Referee: Mattias Gestranius (Finland)

=== 2015 ===
27 March UEFA Euro 2016 qualifying	Liechtenstein	0–5	Austria	Vaduz, Liechtenstein (H)
		Report	Harnik 14'; Janko 16'; Alaba 59'; Junuzović 74'; Arnautović 90+3'	Stadium: Rheinpark Stadion; Attendance: 6,127; Referee: Felix Zwayer (Germany)

31 March Friendly	Liechtenstein	1–0	San Marino	Eschen, Liechtenstein (H)
	Kaufmann 29'	Report		Stadium: Sportpark Eschen-Maur; Attendance: 450; Referee: Nikolaj Hänni (Switzerland)

10 June Friendly	Switzerland	3–0	Liechtenstein	Thun, Switzerland (A)
	Džemaili 29', 68'; Shaqiri 60'	Report		Stadium: Stockhorn Arena; Attendance: 8,100; Referee: Richard Trutz (Slovakia)

14 June UEFA Euro 2016 qualifying	Liechtenstein	1–1	Moldova	Vaduz, Liechtenstein (H)
	Wieser 20'	Report	Boghiu 43'	Stadium: Rheinpark Stadion; Attendance: 2,080; Referee: Libor Kovařík (Czech Republic)

5 September UEFA Euro 2016 qualifying	Montenegro	2–0	Liechtenstein	Podgorica, Montenegro (A)
	Bećiraj 38'; Jovetić 56'	Report		Stadium: Podgorica City Stadium; Attendance: 0 Referee: Javier Estrada (Spain)

8 September UEFA Euro 2016 qualifying	Liechtenstein	0–7	Russia	Vaduz, Liechtenstein (H)
		Report	Dzyuba 21', 45', 73', 90'; Kokorin 40' (pen.); Smolov 77'; Dzagoev 85'	Stadium: Rheinpark Stadion; Attendance: 2,874; Referee: Bobby Madden (Scotland)

9 October UEFA Euro 2016 qualifying	Liechtenstein	0–2	Sweden	Vaduz, Liechtenstein (H)
		Report	Berg 18'; Ibrahimović 55'	Stadium: Rheinpark Stadion; Attendance: 4,740; Referee: Liran Liany (Israel)

12 October UEFA Euro 2016 qualifying	Austria	3–0	Liechtenstein	Vienna, Austria (A)
	Arnautović 12'; Janko 54', 57'	Report		Stadium: Ernst-Happel-Stadion; Attendance: 44,200; Referee: Miroslav Zelinka (Czech Republic)

=== 2016 ===
23 March Friendly	Gibraltar	0–0	Liechtenstein	Gibraltar (A)
		Report		Stadium: Victoria Stadium; Referee: Ryan Stewart (Wales)

28 March Friendly	Faroe Islands	3–2	Liechtenstein	Marbella, Spain (N)
	Olsen 6'; Edmundsson 43'; Vatnhamar 58'	Report	Gubser 73'; Wolfinger 90+3'	Stadium: Estadio Municipal de Marbella; Attendance: 50; Referee: Jesús Gil Manzano (Spain)

6 June Friendly	Iceland	4–0	Liechtenstein	Reykjavík, Iceland (A)
	Kolbeinn Sigþórsson 11'; Birkir Már Sævarsson 21'; Alfreð Finnbogason 42'; Eiður Guðjohnsen 83'	Report		Stadium: Laugardalsvöllur; Attendance: 8,401; Referee: Marcin Borski (Poland)

31 August Friendly	Denmark	5–0	Liechtenstein	Horsens, Denmark (A)
	Jørgensen 30', 33'; Cornelius 49'; Fischer 61'; Larsen 84'	Report		Stadium: CASA Arena Horsens; Attendance: 8,004; Referee: Þóroddur Hjaltalín (Iceland)

5 September 2018 FIFA World Cup qualification	Spain	8–0	Liechtenstein	León, Spain (A)
	Costa 10', 66'; Roberto 55'; Silva 59', 90+1'; Vitolo 60'; Morata 82', 83'	Report		Stadium: Estadio Reino de León; Attendance: 12,139; Referee: Simon Lee Evans (Wales)

6 October 2018 FIFA World Cup qualification	Liechtenstein	0–2	Albania	Vaduz, Liechtenstein (H)
		Report	Jehle 12' (o.g.); Balaj 71'	Stadium: Rheinpark Stadion; Attendance: 5,864; Referee: Tamás Bognár (Hungary)

9 October 2018 FIFA World Cup qualification	Israel	2–1	Liechtenstein	Jerusalem, Israel (A)
	Hemed 4', 16'	Report	Göppel 49'	Stadium: Teddy Stadium; Attendance: 9,000; Referee: Clayton Pisani (Malta)

12 November 2018 FIFA World Cup qualification	Liechtenstein	0–4	Italy	Vaduz, Liechtenstein (H)
		Report	Belotti 11', 44'; Immobile 12'; Candreva 32'	Stadium: Rheinpark Stadion; Attendance: 5,864; Referee: Ivan Bebek (Croatia)

=== 2017 ===
24 March 2018 FIFA World Cup qualification	Liechtenstein	0–3	Macedonia	Vaduz, Liechtenstein (H)
		Report	Nikolov 43'; Nestorovski 68', 73'	Stadium: Rheinpark Stadion; Attendance: 4,517; Referee: Jonathan Lardot (Belgium)

7 June Friendly	Finland	1–1	Liechtenstein	Turku, Finland (A)
	Hetemaj 17'	Report	Hasler 62'	Stadium: Veritas Stadion; Attendance: 5,460; Referee: Mohammed Al-Hakim (Sweden)

11 June 2018 FIFA World Cup qualification	Italy	5–0	Liechtenstein	Udine, Italy (A)
	Insigne 35'; Belotti 52'; Éder 75'; Bernardeschi 83'; Gabbiadini 90+1'	Report		Stadium: Stadio Friuli; Attendance: 21,000; Referee: Kevin Clancy (Scotland)

2 September 2018 FIFA World Cup qualification	Albania	2–0	Liechtenstein	Elbasan, Albania (A)
	Roshi 54'; Agolli 78'	Report		Stadium: Elbasan Arena; Attendance: 5,000; Referee: Sergey Lapochkin (Russia)

5 September 2018 FIFA World Cup qualification	Liechtenstein	0–8	Spain	Vaduz, Liechtenstein (H)
		Report	Ramos 3'; Morata 15', 54'; Isco 16'; Silva 39'; Aspas 51', 63'; Göppel 89' (o.g.)	Stadium: Rheinpark Stadion; Attendance: 5,864; Referee: Ivaylo Stoyanov (Bulgaria)

6 October 2018 FIFA World Cup qualification	Liechtenstein	0–1	Israel	Vaduz, Liechtenstein (H)
		Report	Tibi 21'	Stadium: Rheinpark Stadion; Attendance: 3,498; Referee: Arnold Hunter (Northern Ireland)

9 October 2018 FIFA World Cup qualification	Macedonia	4–0	Liechtenstein	Strumica, Macedonia (A)
	Musliu 36'; Trajkovski 38'; Bardhi 67'; Ademi 69'	Report		Stadium: Stadion Mladost; Attendance: 6,000; Referee: Laurent Kopriwa (Luxembourg)

14 December Friendly	Qatar	1–2	Liechtenstein	Doha, Qatar (A)
17:30 AST	Ali 6'	Report	Salanovic 29'; Polverino 90' (pen.)	Stadium: Khalifa International Stadium; Attendance: 50; Referee: Ali Mahmoud (Kuwait)

=== 2018 ===
21 March Friendly	Liechtenstein	0–1	Andorra	La Línea de la Concepción, Spain (N)
18:00 UTC+1		Report	Rebés 6'	Stadium: Estadio Municipal; Attendance: 25; Referee: Rohit Saggi (Norway)

25 March Friendly	Faroe Islands	3–0	Liechtenstein	Marbella, Spain (N)
18:00 UTC+2	Bartalsstovu 12'; Olsen 80'; Nattestad 85'	Report		Stadium: Marbella Football Center; Attendance: 100; Referee: Markus Strömbergsson (Sweden)

6 September 2018–19 UEFA Nations League	Armenia	2–1	Liechtenstein	Yerevan, Armenia (A)
20:00 UTC+4	Pizzelli 30'; Barseghyan 76'	Report	Wolfinger 33'	Stadium: Vazgen Sargsyan Republican Stadium; Referee: Enea Jorgji (Albania)

9 September 2018–19 UEFA Nations League	Liechtenstein	2–0	Gibraltar	Vaduz, Liechtenstein (H)
20:45 UTC+2	Salanović 32'; Wieser 72'	Report		Stadium: Rheinpark Stadion; Attendance: 1,110; Referee: Alan Mario Sant (Malta)

13 October 2018–19 UEFA Nations League	Macedonia	4–1	Liechtenstein	Skopje, Macedonia (A)
20:45 UTC+2	Trajkovski 10', 30'; Pandev 36'; Alioski 67'	Report	Yildiz 37'	Stadium: Philip II Arena; Attendance: 10,000; Referee: Roi Reinshreiber (Israel)

16 October 2018–19 UEFA Nations League	Gibraltar	2–1	Liechtenstein	Gibraltar (A)
20:45 UTC+2	Cabrera 61'; J. Chipolina 66'	Report	Salanović 15'	Stadium: Victoria Stadium; Attendance: 2,000; Referee: Vasilis Dimitriou (Cyprus)

16 November 2018–19 UEFA Nations League	Liechtenstein	0–2	Macedonia	Vaduz, Liechtenstein (H)
20:45 UTC+1		Report	Bardhi 53'; Nestorovski 90+1'	Stadium: Rheinpark Stadion; Attendance: 2,100; Referee: Petr Ardeleánu (Czech Republic)

19 November 2018–19 UEFA Nations League	Liechtenstein	2–2	Armenia	Vaduz, Liechtenstein (H)
20:45 UTC+1	Büchel 44'; Hasler 47'	Report	Adamyan 9'; Karapetian 85'	Stadium: Rheinpark Stadion; Attendance: 1,166; Referee: Alain Durieux (Luxembourg)

=== 2019 ===
23 March UEFA Euro 2020 qualifying	Liechtenstein	0–2	Greece	Vaduz, Liechtenstein (H)
20:45 (UTC+2)		Report (UEFA)	Fortounis 45+1'; Donis 80'	Stadium: Rheinpark Stadion; Attendance: 2,711; Referee: Alexandre Boucaut (Belgium)

26 March UEFA Euro 2020 qualifying	Italy	6–0	Liechtenstein	Parma, Italy (A)
20:45 (UTC+1)	Sensi 17'; Verratti 32'; Quagliarella 35' (pen.), 45+3' (pen.); Kean 70'; Pavoletti 76'	Report (UEFA)		Stadium: Stadio Ennio Tardini; Attendance: 20,000; Referee: Kirill Levnikov (Russia)

8 June UEFA Euro 2020 qualifying	Armenia	3–0	Liechtenstein	Yerevan, Armenia (A)
18:00 (UTC+2)	Ghazaryan 2'; Karapetian 18'; Barseghyan 90+1'	Report (UEFA)		Stadium: Vazgen Sargsyan Republican Stadium; Attendance: 10,000; Referee: Nikola Popov (Bulgaria)

11 June UEFA Euro 2020 qualifying	Liechtenstein	0–2	Finland	Vaduz, Liechtenstein (H)
20:45 (UTC+2)		Report (UEFA)	Pukki 37'; Källman 57'	Stadium: Rheinpark Stadion; Attendance: 2,160; Referee: Jens Maae (Denmark)

5 September UEFA Euro 2020 qualifying	Bosnia and Herzegovina	5–0	Liechtenstein	Zenica, Bosnia and Herzegovina (A)
20:45 (UTC+2)	Gojak 11', 89'; Malin 80' (o.g.); Džeko 85'; Višća 88'	Report (UEFA)		Stadium: Bilino Polje Stadium; Attendance: 3,825; Referee: Glenn Nyberg (Sweden)

8 September UEFA Euro 2020 qualifying	Greece	1–1	Liechtenstein	Athens, Greece (A)
20:45 (UTC+2)	Masouras 33'	Report	Salanović 85'	Stadium: Olympic Stadium; Attendance: 3,445; Referee: Alexander Harkam (Austria)

12 October UEFA Euro 2020 qualifying	Liechtenstein	1–1	Armenia	Vaduz, Liechtenstein (H)
20:45 (UTC+2)	Y. Frick 72'	Report	Barseghyan 19'	Stadium: Rheinpark Stadion; Referee: István Kovács (Romania)

15 October UEFA Euro 2020 qualifying	Liechtenstein	0–5	Italy	Vaduz, Liechtenstein (H)
20:45 (UTC+2)		Report	Bernardeschi 2'; Belotti 70', 90+2'; Romagnoli 77'; El Shaarawy 82'	Stadium: Rheinpark Stadion; Referee: Andris Treimanis (Latvia)

15 November UEFA Euro 2020 qualifying	Finland	3–0	Liechtenstein	Helsinki, Finland (A)
18:00 (UTC+2)	Tuominen 21'; Pukki 64' (pen.), 75'	Report		Stadium: Telia 5G -areena Referee: Benoît Bastien (France)

18 November UEFA Euro 2020 qualifying	Liechtenstein	0–3	Bosnia and Herzegovina	Vaduz, Liechtenstein (H)
20:45 (UTC+2)		Report	Ćivić 57'; Hodžić 64', 72'	Stadium: Rheinpark Stadion; Referee: Halis Özkahya (Turkey)
