= 1981 President's Cup Football Tournament =

1981 President's Cup
Tournament details
- Host country: South Korea
- Dates: 13–26 June
- Teams: 12

Final positions
- Champions: South Korea (7th title) (Argentina) Racing (C) (1st title)
- Third place: (Brazil) Vitória-ES
- Fourth place: (Uruguay) Danubio

Tournament statistics
- Matches played: 34
- Goals scored: 90 (2.65 per match)
- Top scorer(s): (Brazil) João Francisco (6 goals)

The 1981 President's Cup Football Tournament (Korean: 제11회 대통령배 국제축구대회) was the 11th competition of Korea Cup. The competition was held from 13 to 26 June 1981. South Korea and Racing de Córdoba played out a 2–2 draw and shared the trophy.

== Group stage ==
=== Group A ===
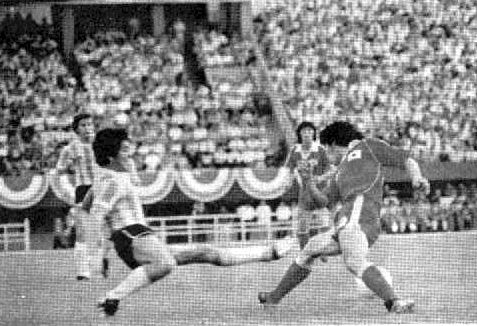
Racing de Córdoba and Japan national team in Daejeon

Team	Pld	W	D	L	GF	GA	GD	Pts	Qualification
(Argentina) Racing (C)	5	4	1	0	15	4	+11	9	Qualification to semi-finals
South Korea	5	3	2	0	10	3	+7	8	Qualification to semi-finals
(West Germany) Saarbrücken	5	3	0	2	7	9	−2	6	
Japan	5	2	0	3	4	4	0	4	
Malaysia	5	1	0	4	3	12	−9	2	
(France) Châteauroux	5	0	1	4	5	12	−7	1	

13 June 1981
15:30 UTC+9

South Korea	1–1	(France) Châteauroux
Byun Byung-joo 5'	Report; Newscast	Bellavia 51'

Dongdaemun Stadium, Seoul

13 June 1981
17:15 UTC+9

Japan	0–1	(West Germany) Saarbrücken
	Report	Philippe 51'

Dongdaemun Stadium, Seoul

13 June 1981
19:00 UTC+9

Racing (C) (Argentina)	6–0	Malaysia

Dongdaemun Stadium, Seoul

15 June 1981
13:30 UTC+9

Châteauroux (France)	0–2	Malaysia
	Report	Ibrahim 40'; Julkipli 75'

Daejeon Hanbat Sports Complex, Daejeon

15 June 1981
15:15 UTC+9

Racing (C) (Argentina)	1–0	Japan

Daejeon Hanbat Sports Complex, Daejeon

15 June 1981
17:00 UTC+9

South Korea	4–1	(West Germany) Saarbrücken
Lee Kang-jo 21'; Byun Byung-joo 41', 77'; Cho Kwang-rae 51'	Report	Malek 56'

Daejeon Hanbat Sports Complex, Daejeon

17 June 1981
13:30 UTC+9

Racing (C) (Argentina)	3–0	(West Germany) Saarbrücken
Amuchástegui 12'; López 17'; Molina 82'

Jeonju Sports Complex, Jeonju

17 June 1981
15:15 UTC+9

Châteauroux (France)	0–2	Japan
		Kato 33'; Kaneda 80'

Jeonju Sports Complex, Jeonju

17 June 1981
17:00 UTC+9

South Korea	2–0	Malaysia
Chung Hae-won 48', 52'

Jeonju Sports Complex, Jeonju

19 June 1981
15:30 UTC+9

Châteauroux (France)	1–3	(West Germany) Saarbrücken

Daegu Civic Stadium, Daegu

19 June 1981
17:15 UTC+9

Japan	2–0	Malaysia
Yokoyama 22', 52'

Daegu Civic Stadium, Daegu

19 June 1981
19:00 UTC+9

South Korea	1–1	(Argentina) Racing (C)
Byun Byung-joo 74'	Report	Ballejo 40' (pen.)

Daegu Civic Stadium, Daegu

21 June 1981
13:30 UTC+9

Malaysia	1–2	(West Germany) Saarbrücken
? ?'		Metzger ?'; Brehme ?'

Busan Gudeok Stadium, Busan

21 June 1981
15:15 UTC+9

Châteauroux (France)	3–4	(Argentina) Racing (C)
	Report	Arce ?', ?'

Busan Gudeok Stadium, Busan

21 June 1981
17:00 UTC+9

South Korea	2–0	Japan
Oh Seok-jae 43'; Lee Tae-yeop 77'

Busan Gudeok Stadium, Busan

=== Group B ===
Team	Pld	W	D	L	GF	GA	GD	Pts	Qualification
(Uruguay) Danubio	5	4	1	0	9	4	+5	9	Qualification to semi-finals
(Brazil) Vitória-ES	5	3	2	0	8	1	+7	8	Qualification to semi-finals
Malta	5	2	2	1	4	2	+2	6	
Thailand	5	2	0	3	7	7	0	4	
Liechtenstein	5	1	1	3	4	8	−4	3	
Indonesia	5	0	0	5	4	14	−10	0	

14 June 1981
13:30 UTC+9

Indonesia	0–4	(Brazil) Vitória-ES
	Report	Francisco ?', ?', ?'; ? ?'

Daejeon Hanbat Sports Complex, Daejeon

14 June 1981
15:15 UTC+9

Liechtenstein	1–1	Malta
Sklarski 29'		Buttigieg 80'

Daejeon Hanbat Sports Complex, Daejeon
Attendance: 2000

14 June 1981
17:00 UTC+9

Danubio (Uruguay)	3–2	Thailand
Ceres 14'; Caraballo 48'; Berrueta 60'	Report	Vorawan 75'; Chalor 77'

Daejeon Hanbat Sports Complex, Daejeon

16 June 1981
13:30 UTC+9

Danubio (Uruguay)	3–1	Indonesia
Silva 18' (pen.); Caraballo 24'; Gutiérrez 50'		Nasril 10'

Jeonju Sports Complex, Jeonju

16 June 1981
15:15 UTC+9

Thailand	2–0	Liechtenstein
Chalor 46'; Vorawan 66'

Jeonju Sports Complex, Jeonju

16 June 1981
17:00 UTC+9

Malta	0–0	(Brazil) Vitória-ES

Jeonju Sports Complex, Jeonju

18 June 1981
15:30 UTC+9

Malta	1–0	Indonesia
Xuereb 26'	Report

Daegu Civic Stadium, Daegu

18 June 1981
17:15 UTC+9

Thailand	0–1	(Brazil) Vitória-ES
	Report	Francisco 9'

Daegu Civic Stadium, Daegu

18 June 1981
19:00 UTC+9

Danubio (Uruguay)	1–0	Liechtenstein
Pérez 65'	Report

Daegu Civic Stadium, Daegu

20 June 1981
13:30 UTC+9

Thailand	3–1	Indonesia

Busan Gudeok Stadium, Busan

20 June 1981
15:15 UTC+9

Liechtenstein	0–2	(Brazil) Vitória-ES
		Luiz Carlos 41'; Francisco 67' (pen.)

Busan Gudeok Stadium, Busan

20 June 1981
17:00 UTC+9

Danubio (Uruguay)	1–0	Malta
Rivero 29'

Busan Gudeok Stadium, Busan

22 June 1981
15:30 UTC+9

Indonesia	2–3	Liechtenstein
? ?', ?'	Report	Marxer 29', 33', 44'

Dongdaemun Stadium, Seoul

22 June 1981
17:15 UTC+9

Thailand	0–2	Malta
		Degiorgio ?'; Xuereb ?'

Dongdaemun Stadium, Seoul

22 June 1981
19:00 UTC+9

Danubio (Uruguay)	1–1	(Brazil) Vitória-ES
Caraballo 63' (pen.)		J. da Costa 84'

Dongdaemun Stadium, Seoul

== Knockout stage ==
=== Bracket ===
Semi-finals
24 June – Seoul
(Argentina) Racing (C)	2
(Brazil) Vitória-ES	1
24 June – Seoul
(Uruguay) Danubio	0
South Korea	2

Final
26 June – Seoul
(Argentina) Racing (C)	2
South Korea	2
Third place play-off
26 June – Seoul
(Brazil) Vitória-ES	1
(Uruguay) Danubio	0

=== Semi-finals ===
24 June 1981
17:00 UTC+9

Danubio (Uruguay)	0–2	South Korea
	Report	Chung Hae-won 30'; Byun Byung-joo 89'

Dongdaemun Stadium, Seoul

24 June 1981
17:45 UTC+9

Racing (C) (Argentina)	2–1	(Brazil) Vitória-ES
López 41'; Amuchástegui 65'	Report	Francisco 33'

Dongdaemun Stadium, Seoul

=== Third place play-off ===
26 June 1981
17:00 UTC+9

Danubio (Uruguay)	0–1	(Brazil) Vitória-ES
	Report	César ?'

Dongdaemun Stadium, Seoul

=== Final ===
The final match originally had to play extra time, but the game was finished early by the agreement between both directors due to a violent atmosphere. The players of Racing de Córdoba received one red and five yellow cards in the final.

26 June 1981
18:45 UTC+9

South Korea	2–2	(Argentina) Racing (C)
Chung Hae-won 50'; Cho Kwang-rae 74'	Report; Newscast	Oyola 6'; Molina 54'

Dongdaemun Stadium, Seoul

== See also ==
- Korea Cup
- South Korea national football team results
