= 1998 FIFA World Cup qualification – UEFA Group 8 =

Football tournament qualification stage

Group 8 consisted of six of the 50 teams entered into the European zone: (Note: Only 49 of the entered teams actually competed in the qualification tournament: France qualified for the World Cup automatically as host.) Iceland, Liechtenstein, Lithuania, Macedonia, Republic of Ireland, and Romania. These six teams competed on a home-and-away basis for two of the 15 spots in the final tournament allocated to the European zone, with the group's winner and runner-up claiming those spots.

== Standings ==
Pos	Team	Pld	W	D	L	GF	GA	GD	Pts	Qualification	Romania national football team	Republic of Ireland national football team	Lithuania national football team	North Macedonia national football team	Iceland national football team	Liechtenstein national football team
1	Romania	10	9	1	0	37	4	+33	28	Qualification to 1998 FIFA World Cup	—	1–0	3–0	4–2	4–0	8–0
2	Republic of Ireland	10	5	3	2	22	8	+14	18	Advance to second round	1–1	—	0–0	3–0	0–0	5–0
3	Lithuania	10	5	2	3	11	8	+3	17		0–1	1–2	—	2–0	2–0	2–1
4	Macedonia	10	4	1	5	22	18	+4	13		0–3	3–2	1–2	—	1–0	3–0
5	Iceland	10	2	3	5	11	16	−5	9		0–4	2–4	0–0	1–1	—	4–0
6	Liechtenstein	10	0	0	10	3	52	−49	0		1–8	0–5	0–2	1–11	0–4	—

== Matches ==
24 April 1996
19:00 UTC+2

Macedonia	3–0	Liechtenstein
Milosevski 6'; Babunski 49' (pen.); Zaharievski 78'	Report

Gradski, Skopje
Attendance: 11,500
Referee: Loizos Loizou (Cyprus)

1 June 1996
19:00 UTC

Iceland	1–1	Macedonia
A. Gudjónsson 63'	Report	Memedi 60'

Laugardalsvöllur, Reykjavík
Attendance: 3,051
Referee: Roelof Luinge (Netherlands)

31 August 1996
20:00 UTC+3

Romania	3–0	Lithuania
Moldovan 20'; Petrescu 65'; Gâlcă 77'	Report

Steaua, Bucharest
Attendance: 9,000
Referee: Vasyl Melnychuk (Ukraine)
31 August 1996
18:00 UTC+2

Liechtenstein	0–5	Republic of Ireland
	Report	Townsend 5'; O'Neill 9'; Quinn 12', 61'; Harte 20'

Sportpark Eschen-Mauren, Eschen
Attendance: 3,900
Referee: Sergei Shmolik (Belarus)

5 October 1996
18:30 UTC+3

Lithuania	2–0	Iceland
Jankauskas 22' (pen.); Šlekys 74'	Report

Zalgiris, Vilnius
Attendance: 8,000
Referee: Marnix Sandra (Belgium)

9 October 1996
19:00 UTC

Iceland	0–4	Romania
	Report	D. Munteanu 21'; Hagi 60'; Gh. Popescu 75'; Petrescu 81'

Laugardalsvöllur, Reykjavík
Attendance: 3,064
Referee: Claude Détruche (Switzerland)
9 October 1996
19:30 UTC+1

Republic of Ireland	3–0	Macedonia
McAteer 8'; Cascarino 46', 70'	Report

Lansdowne Road, Dublin
Attendance: 31,671
Referee: Knud Erik Fisker (Denmark)
9 October 1996
18:30 UTC+3

Lithuania	2–1	Liechtenstein
Jankauskas 43'; Narbekovas 55'	Report	H.Zech 53'

Zalgiris, Vilnius
Attendance: 8,000
Referee: Xaqani Memmedov (Azerbaijan)

9 November 1996
13:30 UTC+1

Liechtenstein	1–11	Macedonia
F. Schädler 78'	Report	Glavevski 8', 12', 60'; Hristov 23'; Stojkovski 30', 43'; T.Micevski 45', 49'; Ćirić 53', 87'; V.Micevski 90'

Sportpark Eschen-Mauren, Eschen
Attendance: 2,700
Referee: Haim Lipkovitz (Israel)
10 November 1996
15:00 UTC

Republic of Ireland	0–0	Iceland
	Report

Lansdowne Road, Dublin
Attendance: 32,620
Referee: Stefan Ormandzhiev (Bulgaria)

14 December 1996
13:00 UTC+1

Macedonia	0–3	Romania
	Report	Popescu 36', 45', 90' (pen.)

Gradski, Skopje
Attendance: 14,000
Referee: Roger Philippi (Luxembourg)

29 March 1997
18:00 UTC+2

Romania	8–0	Liechtenstein
V. Moldovan 10'; Popescu 28', 30', 68', 88'; Hagi 47'; Petrescu 48'; Craioveanu 71'	Report

Steaua, Bucharest
Attendance: 3,000
Referee: Romans Lajuks (Latvia)

2 April 1997
18:30 UTC+3

Lithuania	0–1	Romania
	Report	V. Moldovan 73'

Zalgiris, Vilnius
Attendance: 7,000
Referee: Edgar Steinborn (Germany)
2 April 1997
17:00 UTC+2

Macedonia	3–2	Republic of Ireland
Stojkovski 28', 44' (pen.); Hristov 59'	Report	McLoughlin 8'; Kelly 78'

Gradski, Skopje
Attendance: 11,000
Referee: Alfredo Trentalange (Italy)

30 April 1997
20:00 UTC+3

Romania	1–0	Republic of Ireland
A.Ilie 33'	Report

Ghencea, Bucharest
Attendance: 18,000
Referee: Mario van der Ende (Netherlands)
30 April 1997
17:00 UTC+2

Liechtenstein	0–2	Lithuania
	Report	Jankauskas 66'; Ražanauskas 89'

Sportpark Eschen-Mauren, Eschen
Attendance: 812
Referee: Bujar Pregja (Albania)

21 May 1997
19:30 UTC+1

Republic of Ireland	5–0	Liechtenstein
Connolly 28', 34', 41'; Cascarino 61', 80'	Report

Lansdowne Road, Dublin
Attendance: 33,200
Referee: Andrei Butenko (Russia)

7 June 1997
20:00 UTC+2

Macedonia	1–0	Iceland
Hristov 54'	Report

Gradski, Skopje
Attendance: 10,000
Referee: Vadim Zhuk (Belarus)

11 June 1997
15:00 UTC

Iceland	0–0	Lithuania
	Report

Laugardalsvöllur, Reykjavík
Attendance: 4,025
Referee: Leslie Irvine (Northern Ireland)

20 August 1997
20:45 UTC+3

Romania	4–2	Macedonia
V. Moldovan 36', 68'; Gâlcă 40'; Dumitrescu 66'	Report	Djokic 52', 90'

Ghencea, Bucharest
Attendance: 12,000
Referee: Metin Tokat (Turkey)
20 August 1997
19:30 UTC+1

Republic of Ireland	0–0	Lithuania
	Report

Lansdowne Road, Dublin
Attendance: 32,620
Referee: Jorge Monteiro Coroado (Portugal)
20 August 1997
17:30 UTC+2

Liechtenstein	0–4	Iceland
	Report	Daníelsson 28'; Gunnarsson 40'; Sg. Jónsson 62'; T. Gudmundsson 63'

Sportpark Eschen-Mauren, Eschen
Attendance: 1,651
Referee: Oleg Timofejev (Estonia)

6 September 1997
15:30 UTC+2

Liechtenstein	1–8	Romania
M.Frick 62'	Report	V. Moldovan 5'; Craioveanu 10', 32'; Doboş 35'; D. Munteanu 43', 45', 67'; Barbu 53'

Sportpark Eschen-Mauren, Eschen
Attendance: 5,100
Referee: Alfred Micallef (Malta)
6 September 1997
14:00 UTC

Iceland	2–4	Republic of Ireland
B. Gunnarsson 45'; H. Sigurdsson 47'	Report	Connolly 13'; Keane 55', 65'; Kennedy 79'

Laugardalsvöllur, Reykjavík
Attendance: 3,981
Referee: Ante Kulusic (Croatia)
6 September 1997
18:30 UTC+3

Lithuania	2–0	Macedonia
Ivanauskas 27'; Preikšaitis 88'	Report

Zalgiris, Vilnius
Attendance: 6,000
Referee: Lucílio Batista (Portugal)

10 September 1997
19:30 UTC+3

Romania	4–0	Iceland
Hagi 9', 82'; Petrescu 41'; Gâlcă 65'	Report

Ghencea, Bucharest
Attendance: 5,256
Referee: David Elleray (England)
10 September 1997
21:00 UTC+3

Lithuania	1–2	Republic of Ireland
Žiukas 51'	Report	Cascarino 17', 72'

Zalgiris, Vilnius
Attendance: 7,000
Referee: Giorgos Bikas (Greece)

11 October 1997
15:00 UTC+1

Republic of Ireland	1–1	Romania
Cascarino 83'	Report	Hagi 53'

Lansdowne Road, Dublin
Attendance: 34,500
Referee: Nikolai Levnikov (Russia)
11 October 1997
16:00 UTC+2

Macedonia	1–2	Lithuania
Sakiri 45'	Report	Buitkus 70', 81'

Gradski, Skopje
Attendance: 4,000
Referee: Miroslav Liba (Czech Republic)
11 October 1997
14:00 UTC

Iceland	4–0	Liechtenstein
Th. Gudjonsson 58'; T. Gudmundsson 60'; A. Gudjónsson 66'; B. Gudjónsson 73'	Report

Laugardalsvollur, Reykjavík
Attendance: 550
Referee: Alan Howells (Wales)

== Goalscorers ==
There were 106 goals scored in 30 matches, for an average of 3.53 goals per match.

8 goals

- (Romania) Gheorghe Popescu

7 goals

- (Republic of Ireland) Tony Cascarino

6 goals

- (Romania) Viorel Moldovan

5 goals

- (Romania) Gheorghe Hagi

4 goals

- (Republic of Ireland) David Connolly
- (North Macedonia) Mitko Stojkovski
- (Romania) Dorinel Munteanu
- (Romania) Dan Petrescu

3 goals

- (Lithuania) Edgaras Jankauskas
- (North Macedonia) Dejvi Glavevski
- (North Macedonia) Georgi Hristov
- (Romania) Gheorghe Craioveanu
- (Romania) Constantin Gâlcă

2 goals

- (Iceland) Arnór Guðjohnsen
- (Iceland) Tryggvi Guðmundsson
- (Iceland) Brynjar Björn Gunnarsson
- (Republic of Ireland) Roy Keane
- (Republic of Ireland) Niall Quinn
- (Lithuania) Orestas Buitkus
- (North Macedonia) Saša Ćirić
- (North Macedonia) Miroslav Gjokić
- (North Macedonia) Toni Micevski

1 goal

- (Iceland) Einar Daníelsson
- (Iceland) Bjarni Guðjónsson
- (Iceland) Þórður Guðjónsson
- (Iceland) Sigurður Jónsson
- (Iceland) Helgi Sigurðsson
- (Republic of Ireland) Ian Harte
- (Republic of Ireland) David Kelly
- (Republic of Ireland) Mark Kennedy
- (Republic of Ireland) Jason McAteer
- (Republic of Ireland) Alan McLoughlin
- (Republic of Ireland) Keith O'Neill
- (Republic of Ireland) Andy Townsend
- (Liechtenstein) Mario Frick
- (Liechtenstein) Franz Schädler
- (Liechtenstein) Harry Zech
- (Lithuania) Valdas Ivanauskas
- (Lithuania) Arminas Narbekovas
- (Lithuania) Aidas Preikšaitis
- (Lithuania) Tomas Ražanauskas
- (Lithuania) Vaidotas Šlekys
- (Lithuania) Tomas Žiukas
- (North Macedonia) Boban Babunski
- (North Macedonia) Nedžmedin Memedi
- (North Macedonia) Vančo Micevski
- (North Macedonia) Sašo Miloševski
- (North Macedonia) Artim Šakiri
- (North Macedonia) Srgjan Zaharievski
- (Romania) Constantin Barbu
- (Romania) Anton Doboş
- (Romania) Ilie Dumitrescu
- (Romania) Adrian Ilie
