= 2010 in Icelandic football =

The Iceland national football team schedule results and fixtures for 2010 in detail.

== National team ==
=== Record ===
Competition	GP	W	D	L	GF	GA
International Friendly	6	2	3	1	9	4
UEFA Euro 2012 Qualifiers	3	0	0	3	2	6
Total	9	2	3	4	11	10

Updated as of 17 November 2010

=== Goal Scorers ===
Player	Goals
Heiðar Helguson	4
Kolbeinn Sigþórsson	3
Alfreð Finnbogason	1
Stefán Gíslason	1
Veigar Páll Gunnarsson	1
Matthías Vilhjálmsson	1

Updated as of 17 November 2010

=== Schedule ===
3 March 2010 International Friendly	Cyprus	0–0	Iceland	Larnaca, Cyprus
17:00 UTC+2		Report		Stadium: Antonis Papadopoulos Stadium

21 March 2010 International Friendly	Iceland	2–0	Faroe Islands	Reykjavík, Iceland
13:00 UTC	Vilhjálmsson 10'; Sigþórsson 37'	Report		Stadium: Kórinn fjölnota knatthús Attendance: 250; Referee: Claus Bo Larsen (Denmark)

24 March 2010 International Friendly	Mexico	0–0	Iceland	Charlotte, North Carolina, United States
23:00 UTC		Report		Stadium: Bank of America Stadium; Attendance: 70,000; Referee: Mark Geiger (USA)

29 May 2010 International Friendly	Iceland	4–0	Andorra	Reykjavík, Iceland
16:00 UTC	Helguson 32' (pen.), 51'; Gunnarsson 87' (pen.); Sigþórsson 89'	Report		Stadium: Laugardalsvöllur; Attendance: 2,567; Referee: Halldór Jóhannsson (Iceland)

10 August 2010 International Friendly	Iceland	1–1	Liechtenstein	Reykjavík, Iceland
19:30 UTC	Gíslason 20'		Stocklasa 68'	Stadium: Laugardalsvöllur

3 September 2010 UEFA Euro 2012 Qual.	Iceland	1–2	Norway	Reykjavík, Iceland
19:00 UTC	Helguson 38'	Report	Hangeland 59'; Abdellaoue 75'	Stadium: Laugardalsvöllur; Attendance: 6,137; Referee: Luca Banti (Italy)

7 September 2010 UEFA Euro 2012 Qual.	Denmark	1–0	Iceland	Copenhagen, Denmark
	Kahlenberg 90+1'	Report		Stadium: Parken Stadium; Attendance: 18,908; Referee: Dougie McDonald (Scotland)

12 October 2010 UEFA Euro 2012 Qual.	Iceland	1–3	Portugal	Reykjavík, Iceland
	Helguson 17'	Report	Ronaldo 3'; R. Meireles 27'; H. Postiga 72'	Stadium: Laugardalsvöllur; Attendance: 9,767; Referee: Thomas Einwaller (Austria)

17 November 2010 International Friendly	Israel	3–2	Iceland	Tel Aviv, Israel
	Damari 6', 14'; Refaelov 27'		Finnbogason 79'; Sigþórsson 85'	Stadium: Bloomfield Stadium; Attendance: 4,500
