= Liechtenstein national football team results =

Liechtenstein national football team results are divided into:

- Liechtenstein national football team results (1981–2019)
- Liechtenstein national football team results (2020–present)
