= UEFA Euro 2004 qualifying Group 7 =

Football tournament qualification stage

Standings and results for Group 7 of the UEFA Euro 2004 qualifying tournament.

Group 7 consisted of England, Liechtenstein, Macedonia, Slovakia and Turkey. Group winners were England, who finished one point clear of second-placed team Turkey who qualified for the play-offs.

== Standings ==
Pos	Team	Pld	W	D	L	GF	GA	GD	Pts	Qualification	(England)	(Turkey)	(Slovakia)	(North Macedonia)	(Liechtenstein)
1	England	8	6	2	0	14	5	+9	20	Qualify for final tournament	—	2–0	2–1	2–2	2–0
2	Turkey	8	6	1	1	17	5	+12	19	Advance to play-offs	0–0	—	3–0	3–2	5–0
3	Slovakia	8	3	1	4	11	9	+2	10		1–2	0–1	—	1–1	4–0
4	Macedonia	8	1	3	4	11	14	−3	6		1–2	1–2	0–2	—	3–1
5	Liechtenstein	8	0	1	7	2	22	−20	1		0–2	0–3	0–2	1–1	—

Source: UEFA
Rules for classification: Qualification tiebreakers

== Matches ==
7 September 2002
20:30 UTC+3

Turkey	3–0	Slovakia
Akın 14'; Erdem 44', 65'	Report

Ali Sami Yen Stadium, Istanbul
Attendance: 17,300
Referee: Antonio Jesús López Nieto (Spain)
8 September 2002
17:00 UTC+2

Liechtenstein	1–1	Macedonia
Mi. Stocklasa 90+3'	Report	Hristov 8'

Rheinpark Stadion, Vaduz
Attendance: 2,650
Referee: Vitaliy Godulyan (Ukraine)

12 October 2002
19:00 UTC+2

Macedonia	1–2	Turkey
Grozdanoski 2'	Report	Okan 29'; Nihat 53'

Gradski Stadium, Skopje
Attendance: 16,211
Referee: Knud Erik Fisker (Denmark)
12 October 2002
19:30 UTC+2

Slovakia	1–2	England
Németh 23'	Report	Beckham 64'; Owen 82'

Tehelné pole, Bratislava
Attendance: 28,500
Referee: Domenico Messina (Italy)

16 October 2002
20:30 UTC+3

Turkey	5–0	Liechtenstein
Okan 7'; Davala 14'; Mansız 23'; Akın 81', 90'	Report

Ali Sami Yen Stadium, Istanbul
Attendance: 10,890
Referee: Yuri Baskakov (Russia)
16 October 2002
20:00 UTC+1

England	2–2	Macedonia
Beckham 13'; Gerrard 35'	Report	Šakiri 10'; Trajanov 24'

St Mary's Stadium, Southampton
Attendance: 32,095
Referee: Arturo Daudén Ibáñez (Spain)

29 March 2003
18:30 UTC+1

Liechtenstein	0–2	England
	Report	Owen 28'; Beckham 53'

Rheinpark Stadion, Vaduz
Attendance: 3,548
Referee: Georgios Kasnaferis (Greece)
29 March 2003
19:00 UTC+1

Macedonia	0–2	Slovakia
	Report	Petráš 28'; Reiter 90'

Gradski Stadium, Skopje
Attendance: 7,000
Referee: Laurent Duhamel (France)

2 April 2003
19:00 UTC+2

Slovakia	4–0	Liechtenstein
Reiter 19'; Németh 50', 64'; Janočko 89'	Report

Štadión Antona Malatinského, Trnava
Attendance: 75 (Note: Slovakia v Liechtenstein was played without spectators due to sanctions imposed by UEFA as a result of racist behaviour by Slovak supporters at the home match against England.)
Referee: Darko Čeferin (Slovenia)
2 April 2003
20:00 UTC+1

England	2–0	Turkey
Vassell 75'; Beckham 90+2' (pen.)	Report

Stadium of Light, Sunderland
Attendance: 47,667
Referee: Urs Meier (Switzerland)

7 June 2003
20:00 UTC+2

Macedonia	3–1	Liechtenstein
Sedloski 39' (pen.); Krstev 52'; Stojkov 82'	Report	R. Beck 20'

Gradski Stadium, Skopje
Attendance: 2,500
Referee: Jaroslav Jara (Czech Republic)
7 June 2003
20:15 UTC+2

Slovakia	0–1	Turkey
	Report	Nihat 12'

Tehelné pole, Bratislava
Attendance: 18,000
Referee: Terje Hauge (Norway)

11 June 2003
21:00 UTC+3

Turkey	3–2	Macedonia
Nihat 25'; Karadeniz 47'; Hakan Şükür 57'	Report	Grozdanoski 23'; Šakiri 27'

BJK İnönü Stadium, Istanbul
Attendance: 20,900
Referee: Roberto Rosetti (Italy)
11 June 2003
20:00 UTC+1

England	2–1	Slovakia
Owen 61' (pen.), 72'	Report	Janočko 31'

Riverside Stadium, Middlesbrough
Attendance: 33,106
Referee: Wolfgang Stark (Germany)

6 September 2003
18:30 UTC+2

Macedonia	1–2	England
Hristov 27'	Report	Rooney 53'; Beckham 63' (pen.)

Gradski Stadium, Skopje
Attendance: 20,500
Referee: Frank de Bleeckere (Belgium)
6 September 2003
20:00 UTC+2

Liechtenstein	0–3	Turkey
	Report	Metin 14'; Okan 41'; Hakan Sükür 50'

Rheinpark Stadion, Vaduz
Attendance: 4,200
Referee: Dick van Egmond (Netherlands)

10 September 2003
20:15 UTC+2

Slovakia	1–1	Macedonia
Németh 25'	Report	Dimitrovski 62'

Stadium Pod Dubňom, Žilina
Attendance: 2,286
Referee: Leif Sundell (Sweden)
10 September 2003
20:00 UTC+1

England	2–0	Liechtenstein
Owen 46'; Rooney 52'	Report

Old Trafford, Manchester
Attendance: 64,931
Referee: Knud Erik Fisker (Denmark)

11 October 2003
20:00 UTC+3

Turkey	0–0	England
	Report

Şükrü Saracoğlu Stadium, Istanbul
Attendance: 42,000
Referee: Pierluigi Collina (Italy)
11 October 2003
20:00 UTC+2

Liechtenstein	0–2	Slovakia
	Report	Vittek 40', 56'

Rheinpark Stadion, Vaduz
Attendance: 955
Referee: Jouni Hyytiä (Finland)

== Goalscorers ==
There were 55 goals scored in 20 matches, for an average of 2.75 goals per match.

5 goals

- (England national football team) David Beckham
- (England national football team) Michael Owen

4 goals

- (Slovakia national football team) Szilárd Németh

3 goals

- (Turkey national football team) Serhat Akın
- (Turkey national football team) Okan Buruk
- (Turkey national football team) Nihat Kahveci

2 goals

- (England national football team) Wayne Rooney
- (North Macedonia national football team) Vlatko Grozdanoski
- (North Macedonia national football team) Gjorgji Hristov
- (North Macedonia national football team) Artim Šakiri
- (Slovakia national football team) Vladimír Janočko
- (Slovakia national football team) Ľubomír Reiter
- (Slovakia national football team) Róbert Vittek
- (Turkey national football team) Arif Erdem
- (Turkey national football team) Hakan Şükür

1 goal

- (England national football team) Steven Gerrard
- (England national football team) Darius Vassell
- (Liechtenstein national football team) Roger Beck
- (Liechtenstein national football team) Michael Stocklasa
- (North Macedonia national football team) Dragan Dimitrovski
- (North Macedonia national football team) Mile Krstev
- (North Macedonia national football team) Goce Sedloski
- (North Macedonia national football team) Aco Stojkov
- (North Macedonia national football team) Vančo Trajanov
- (Slovakia national football team) Martin Petráš
- (Turkey national football team) Ümit Davala
- (Turkey national football team) Gökdeniz Karadeniz
- (Turkey national football team) İlhan Mansız
- (Turkey national football team) Tümer Metin
