= Tomas Žiukas =

Lithuanian footballer

Personal information
- Full name: Tomas Žiukas
- Date of birth: 2 December 1970 (age 55)
- Place of birth: Klaipėda, Soviet Union
- Height: 1.78 m (5 ft 10 in)
- Position: Fullback

Senior career*
Years	Team	Apps	(Gls)
1991–1994	FK Žalgiris Vilnius		
1994–1995	Romar Mazeikiai		
1995–1996	Kareda Siauliai		
1997–1998	VfB Leipzig		
1998–1999	Kareda Kaunas		
1999–2000	FK Atlantas		
2000–2004	FC Metallurg Lipetsk		

International career^{‡}
1993–2001	Lithuania	45	(1)
- * Club domestic league appearances and goals as of 1 January 2008 ‡ National team caps and goals as of 1 January 2008

Tomas Žiukas (born 2 December 1970) is a Lithuanian international footballer that played as a full-back. He played most prominently for FK Žalgiris Vilnius and Kareda Šiauliai.

== International career ==
Žiukas made 45 appearances for the Lithuania national football team between 1992 and 1998.

=== International goal ===
Scores and results list Lithuania's goal tally first.

No	Date	Venue	Opponent	Score	Result	Competition
1.	10 September 1997	Žalgiris Stadium, Vilnius, Lithuania	Republic of Ireland	1–1	1–2	1998 World Cup qualifier
