= Didier Philippe =

French footballer (born 1961)

Personal information
- Date of birth: 28 September 1961
- Place of birth: Sarralbe, France
- Position: Defender

Senior career*
| Years | Team | Apps | (Gls) |
| 1980–1982 | 1. FC Saarbrücken | | |
| 1982–1987 | Nancy | | |
| 1987–1989 | Laval | | |
| 1992–1993 | FC Martigues | | |

International career
- France U21

Managerial career
- 2004–2006: 1. FC Saarbrücken (assistant)
- 2006: 1. FC Saarbrücken
- 2006: 1. FC Saarbrücken II
- 2006–2007: 1. FC Saarbrücken
- 2011–2012: Dudelange
- * Club domestic league appearances and goals

Didier Philippe (born 28 September 1961) is a French former professional footballer, who played as a defender, and was later a football manager.
