= Lucien Bellavia =

French footballer (1960–2025)

Personal information
- Date of birth: 31 August 1960
- Place of birth: Morhange, France
- Date of death: 6 September 2025 (aged 65)
- Height: 1.72 m (5 ft 8 in)
- Position: Forward

Senior career*
Years	Team	Apps	(Gls)
1978–1979	ASPTT Metz		
1979–1981	Thionville	64	(24)
1981–1984	Châteauroux	97	(18)
1984–1985	Nîmes	3	(2)
- * Club domestic league appearances and goals

Lucien Bellavia (French: [lysjɛ̃ bɛlavja]; 31 August 1960 – 6 September 2025) was a French footballer who played as a forward.

Bellavia played for ASPTT Metz before joining Thionville and Châteauroux and finishing his career with Nîmes.

Bellavia died in September 2025, at the age of 65.
