= İlhan Mansız =

Turkish footballer (b. 1975)

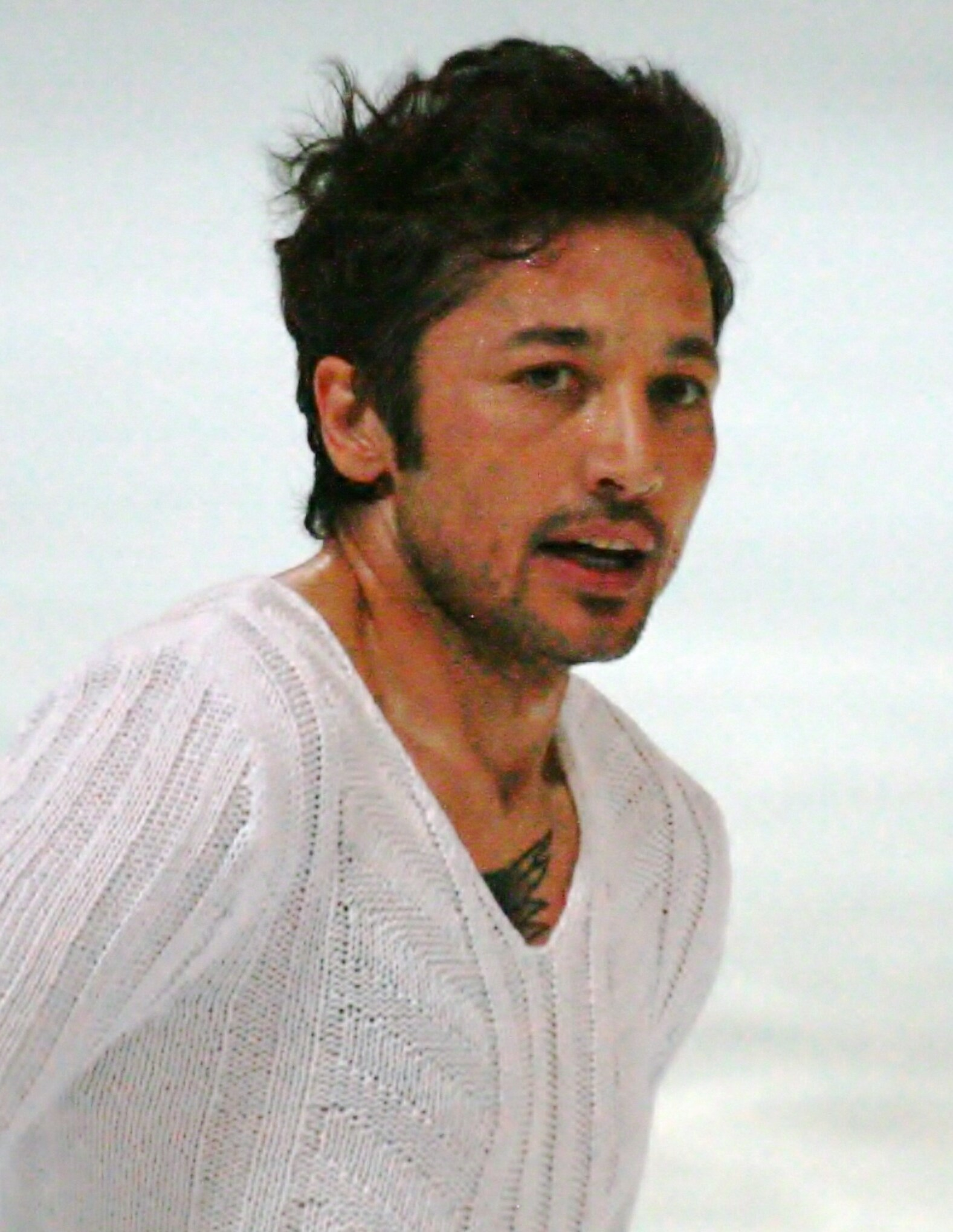
- Mansız in 2013

Personal information
- Date of birth: 10 August 1975 (age 51)
- Place of birth: Kempten, West Germany
- Height: 1.84 m (6 ft 0 in)
- Position: Forward

Youth career
- –1989: SV Lenzfried
- 1989–1992: FC Kempten
- 1992–1994: FC Augsburg

Senior career*
Years	Team	Apps	(Gls)
1994–1995	1. FC Köln II	1	(0)
1995–1996	Gençlerbirliği	2	(0)
1996–1997	SV Türk Gücü München	24	(11)
1997–1998	Kuşadasıspor	37	(19)
1998–2001	Samsunspor	89	(26)
2001–2004	Beşiktaş	66	(36)
2004	Vissel Kobe	3	(0)
2005	Hertha BSC	1	(0)
2005–2007	MKE Ankaragücü	9	(4)
Total		198	(78)

International career
2001–2003	Turkey	21	(7)

Managerial career
- 2018–2019: Beşiktaş (assistant)
Medal record
Men's football
Representing Turkey
FIFA World Cup
Third place	2002 Korea/Japan
- * Club domestic league appearances and goals

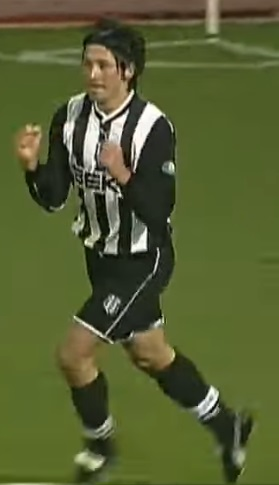
Ilhan Mansız playing for Beşiktaş.

İlhan Mansız (born 10 August 1975) is a German-Turkish former professional footballer who played as a forward. He is also a competing figure skater. He is of Crimean Tatar descent.

== Playing career ==
=== Club career ===
Mansız gained international recognition at Istanbul's Beşiktaş J.K., and was later acquired by the Vissel Kobe football club in Japan.

After his Japan journey, he signed a contract with Hertha BSC, but, because of his injury, he never had a chance to play for the first team. His contract was cancelled due to a clause in the contract saying that if his knee was injured again, they would release him. After his short stint with Hertha BSC, İlhan signed a one-year contract with Turkish club Ankaragücü. He was slowly but surely coming back from his plague of injuries and helping Ankaragücü in the Turkcell Super League.

Before the 2006–07 season, he declared his decision to retire from football. As of 2007 there were rumors that he was getting training in Los Angeles, US, to make a comeback to football. These rumors are revealed by İlhan Mansız and he declared to sign contract with Ankaragücü again. However, this final comeback attempt was abandoned before the 2007–08 season, as he announced his retirement.

After a car accident in 2007, it seemed the career of İlhan Mansız had ended. In July 2009, after seven knee operations, he tried to make a comeback by training with German second-division side TSV 1860 Munich.

=== International career ===
İlhan made his debut for Turkey as a substitute during their final group-stage qualifier against Moldova in October 2001. The speedy striker earned his way onto coach Şenol Güneş' squad on the strength of an outstanding 2001–02 season for Beşiktaş, when he led the Süper Lig in scoring and helped the squad to a third-place finish.

The best goal of his career came in the 2002 FIFA World Cup quarter final against Senegal. He came on as a substitute for Hakan Şükür in the 67th minute, and netted a golden goal in the 94th minute to send Turkey through to the last four of the competition, in which they ended up taking third place. This was the last time where the golden goal was used in World Cup for extra-time matches. In the third place game İlhan Mansız assisted Hakan Şükür to score the fastest goal ever in a World Cup finals match, and went on to score his team's two other goals in the match.

He is also remembered by his rainbow flick against Brazilian defender Roberto Carlos in 2002 World Cup semifinal clash, which was one of the best skill displays of the cup.

Mansız was a relative unknown in international circles prior to the 2002 World Cup. Despite his display of prodigious talent on the world stage, his health concerns and advanced age precluded serious consideration on the part of European clubs. Mansız declared "It is too late for me, I wish I had been discovered sooner in my career."

== Coaching career ==
On 11 July 2018, Beşiktaş J.K. announced via their social media accounts that Mansız was appointed as assistant coach to the club, along with Guti, another former player of club. Mansız quit his job at Beşiktaş on 6 February 2019 due to health concerns.

== Figure skating ==
Mansız learned to skate at the relatively late age of 33 when he competed on the Turkish show Buzda Dans, as a pair skater with partner Oľga Beständigová, who is also his girlfriend.

After winning the show, Mansız announced his goal was to represent Turkey at the 2014 Winter Olympics, hoping to become the first athlete to compete in both the football World Cup and the Winter Olympics since Aleksandar Shalamanov of Bulgaria.

Mansız and Beständigová made their competitive debut at the 2013 Nebelhorn Trophy, which was also the final qualifying opportunity for the 2014 Olympics. They finished 19th and last in the pairs event, ending their hope of skating at the Olympic Games. Nonetheless, they continued to compete.

== Career statistics ==
=== Club ===
Appearances and goals by club, season and competition
Club	Season	League			National Cup		League Cup		Continental		Total	
Club	Season	Division	Apps	Goals	Apps	Goals	Apps	Goals	Apps	Goals	Apps	Goals
Gençlerbirliği	1995–96	Süper Lig	2	0								
Kuşadasıspor	1997–98	Turkish Second Football League	37	19								
Samsunspor	1998–99	Süper Lig	27	4								
Samsunspor	1999-00	Süper Lig	31	10								
Samsunspor	2000–01	Süper Lig	31	12								
Samsunspor	Total		89	26								
Beşiktaş	2001–02	Süper Lig	30	21								
Beşiktaş	2002–03	Süper Lig	23	7								
Beşiktaş	2003–04	Süper Lig	13	8								
Beşiktaş	Total		66	36								
Vissel Kobe	2004	J1 League	3	0	-		0	0	-		3	0
Hertha BSC	2004–05	Bundesliga	0	0								
Ankaragücü	2005–06	Süper Lig	9	4								
Career total			206	85								

=== International ===
Appearances and goals by national team and year
National team	Year	Apps	Goals
Turkey	2001	2	1
Turkey	2002	13	5
Turkey	2003	6	1
Total		21	7

Scores and results list Turkey's goal tally first, score column indicates score after each Mansız goal.

List of international goals scored by İlhan Mansız
No.	Date	Venue	Opponent	Score	Result	Competition
1	6 October 2001	Stadionul Republican, Chişinău, Moldova	Moldova	3–0	3–0	2002 FIFA World Cup qualification
2	17 April 2002	Kerkrade, Netherlands	Chile	2–0	2–0	Friendly
3	22 June 2002	Osaka, Japan	Senegal	1–0	1–0	2002 FIFA World Cup
4	29 June 2002	Daegu, South Korea	South Korea	2–1	3–2	2002 FIFA World Cup
5	29 June 2002	Daegu, South Korea	South Korea	2–1	3–2	2002 FIFA World Cup
6	16 October 2002	Istanbul, Turkey	Liechtenstein	3–0	5–0	UEFA Euro 2004 qualifying
7	19 November 2003	Istanbul, Turkey	Latvia	1–0	2–2	UEFA Euro 2004 Qualifying

== Honours ==
Beşiktaş

- Süper Lig: 2002–03

Turkey

- FIFA World Cup: third place 2002

Individual

- Süper Lig top goalscorer: 2001–02

Order

- Turkish State Medal of Distinguished Service
