= Gheorghe Craioveanu =

Romanian footballer (born 1968)

Personal information
- Date of birth: 14 February 1968 (age 58)
- Place of birth: Hunedoara, Romania
- Height: 1.82 m (6 ft 0 in)
- Position: Striker

Team information
- Current team: CSM Slatina (president)

Youth career
- 1981–1986: Olt Scornicești

Senior career*
Years	Team	Apps	(Gls)
1987–1988	Constructorul Slatina		
1989–1990	Metalurgistul Slatina		
1990	Drobeta-Turnu Severin		
1991–1995	Universitatea Craiova	129	(61)
1995–1998	Real Sociedad	90	(26)
1998–2002	Villarreal	122	(28)
2002–2006	Getafe	120	(16)
Total		461	(131)

International career
1993–1999	Romania	25	(4)

Managerial career
- 2013–2023: Universitatea Craiova (image director)
- 2025–: CSM Slatina (president)
- * Club domestic league appearances and goals

Gheorghe "Gică" Craioveanu (born 14 February 1968) is a Romanian former professional footballer who played as a striker, currently he is the president of Liga II club CSM Slatina.

He spent most of his professional career in Spain–11 years out of 18–with Real Sociedad, Villarreal and Getafe, respectively, amassing totals of 330 matches and 70 goals in both major levels combined.

A Romanian international in the 1990s, Craioveanu represented the nation at the 1998 World Cup.

== Club career ==
=== Early career ===
Craioveanu, nicknamed Grande, was born on 14 February 1968 in Hunedoara, Romania and began playing junior-level football when he was 13 years old at Olt Scornicești. In 1987 he started his senior career at Constructorul Slatina, three years later moving to neighboring club, Metalurgistul. A year later he went to Drobeta-Turnu Severin where he was coached by his childhood idol Ilie Balaci.

=== Universitatea Craiova ===
In 1991 he went to play for Universitatea Craiova where he made his Divizia A debut on 3 March in a 1–0 away loss to Steaua București. At the end of his first season, Craioveanu helped the club win The Double under coach Sorin Cârțu in which he contributed with three goals scored in 13 league appearances. Cârțu also sent him in the 87th minute to replace Adrian Pigulea in the 2–1 win over FC Bacău in the Cupa României final. Two years later, he would win another Cupa României, with coach Marian Bondrea sending him in the 70th minute to replace Silvian Cristescu in the final, Craioveanu closing the score by the end of the 2–0 victory against Dacia Unirea Brăila. In the following two seasons, Craioveanu would be the top-scorer of the league. He scored 22 goals in the first one and 27 in the second of which eight were in the last two rounds and consisted of five in a 10–3 win over UTA Arad and a hat-trick in his last Divizia A match which was a 5–4 win against Electroputere Craiova.

Craioveanu has a total of 61 goals scored in 129 appearances in the Romanian top-division, all of them for "U" Craiova.

=== Real Sociedad ===
In the summer of 1995, Craioveanu joined La Liga side Real Sociedad that paid $1 million for his transfer. He made his league debut on 8 October when coach Salva Iriarte sent him in the 69th minute to replace Óscar de Paula in a 3–0 away loss to Real Valladolid. He scored his first goal on 17 November in a 3–1 away loss to Real Betis. Craioveanu netted a total of 11 goals until the end of the season, including a brace in a 3–1 win over Celta de Vigo and a hat-trick in a 8–1 victory against Albacete which helped the team finish in seventh position. In the following season he scored eight goals including a brace in a victory against Extremadura and two goals in two draws against Atlético Madrid. In his last season with The White and Blues, he netted seven goals under the guidance of coach Bernd Krauss which include a double in a win over Compostela, helping the team finish in third place.

When Real Sociedad reached 100 years since its foundation, Craioveanu was voted as the club's "most loved foreigner", receiving a marshal's baton as a gift.

=== Villarreal ===
In 1998 he moved to Villarreal where for a short while he was teammates with fellow Romanian Marius Iordache. He played in Villarreal's first ever La Liga match on 31 August under the guidance of coach José Antonio Irulegui, opening the score against Real Madrid with a header in the third minute. Thus he became the first ever scorer in the league for his team, even though the game was lost with 4–1 and Craioveanu was replaced late in the first half after being injured by Roberto Carlos. He would also score in the 1–1 draw against Celta Vigo in the following round. He would go on to score two doubles in victories against Salamanca and Barcelona, two goals in a win and a draw against Atlético Madrid, his side's only goal in a victory over Valencia and also a goal in a 1–1 draw against his former team Real Sociedad. He tallied a total of 13 goals until the end of the season but they were not enough to avoid relegation. Craioveanu stayed with the club one year in Segunda División, netting eight goals which helped The Yellow Submarine promote back to the first league where he would spend two more seasons.

In 2019, the Marca newspaper organized a poll where he was placed sixth in the ranking for the best player in Villarreal's history.

=== Getafe ===
In 2002, Craioveanu went to play for Segunda División side, Getafe, helping the team earn a first-ever promotion to the first league, two years later. Afterwards he was teammates with compatriot Cosmin Contra, scoring his last two top-league goals during the 2004–05 season in a 2–1 loss to Barcelona and a 2–2 draw against Atlético Madrid. In the following season, Craioveanu made his last appearances in the La Liga, totaling 223 matches with 48 goals in the competition.

In 2019, in a poll made by the Marca newspaper, Craioveanu was named the best player in Getafe's history. The city hall of Getafe placed a statue of him in the El Bercial park.

== International career ==
Craioveanu earned 25 caps for Romania, scoring four goals, making his debut on 8 September 1993 when coach Anghel Iordănescu sent him in the 68th minute to replace Ion Vlădoiu in a 4–0 win over Faroe Islands in the 1994 World Cup qualifiers. He scored his first goal for the national team in a friendly that ended with a 2–0 victory over Israel.

He played seven games and scored three goals in both victories against Liechtenstein in the successful 1998 World Cup qualifiers. During the group stage of the final tournament, they earned victories in the first two rounds over Colombia and England, thus mathematically qualifying before the last group match against Tunisia. In order to celebrate, the players dyed their hair blonde and presented themselves like that at the game. However, Craioveanu did not play at all in the group stage, as Iordănescu used him only in the round of 16 when he sent him in the 57th minute to replace captain Gheorghe Hagi in the 1–0 loss to Croatia.

He played five games in the Euro 2000 qualifiers, including his last appearance for The Tricolours on 9 June 1999 in a 4–0 home win over Azerbaijan.

For representing his country at the 1998 World Cup, Craioveanu was decorated by President of Romania Traian Băsescu on 25 March 2008 with the Ordinul "Meritul Sportiv" – (The Medal "The Sportive Merit") class III.

== Post-retirement ==
After retiring, Craioveanu settled in Getafe (the city of his last club) in Madrid's metropolitan area. During the local elections of 2007 he won a sports adviser seat on the local council, running as an independent with backing from the People's Party, a significant event as this was the first suffrage during which Romanian citizens were eligible in other European Union countries, following Romania's European integration. On 16 June 2007, as a result of a local alliance between the Spanish Socialist Workers' Party and Izquierda Unida, which took away PP's control over the Sports Adviser seat, Craioveanu convened with the PP not to hold a political office, and resigned from the council. He also worked as a co-presenter in La Sexta's football programme Minuto y Resultado, and a radio commentator on Onda Cero.

Between 2013 and 2023, Craioveanu was the image director of Universitatea Craiova.

== Personal life ==
Craioveanu has a son, Codruț, from his first marriage, which ended in divorce, and later remarried a Spanish woman named Gemma, with whom he has two children. His son, Alejandro, played youth football for Castellón de la Plana-based CD Drac as well as Villarreal.

In 2025, Craioveanu was named Honorary Citizen of Slatina.

== Career statistics ==
Appearances and goals by national team and year
National team	Year	Apps	Goals
Romania	1993	2	0
Romania	1994	1	0
Romania	1995	2	0
Romania	1996	4	1
Romania	1997	7	3
Romania	1998	4	0
Romania	1999	5	0
Total		25	4

Scores and results list Romania's goal tally first, score column indicates score after each Craioveanu goal.

List of international goals scored by Gheorghe Craioveanu
#	Date	Venue	Opponent	Score	Result	Competition
1	14 August 1996	Stadionul Steaua, Bucharest, Romania	Israel	2–0	2–0	Friendly
2	29 March 1997	Stadionul Steaua, Bucharest, Romania	Liechtenstein	7–0	8–0	1998 FIFA World Cup qualification
3	6 September 1997	Sportpark Eschen-Mauren, Eschen, Liechtenstein	Liechtenstein	2–0	8–1	1998 FIFA World Cup qualification
4	6 September 1997	Sportpark Eschen-Mauren, Eschen, Liechtenstein	Liechtenstein	3–0	8–1	1998 FIFA World Cup qualification

== Honours ==
Universitatea Craiova

- Divizia A: 1990–91
- Cupa României: 1990–91, 1992–93

Individual

- Divizia A top scorer: 1993–94, 1994–95
