= Roger Beck =

Liechtenstein footballer

Personal information
- Date of birth: 3 August 1983 (age 43)
- Place of birth: Schaan, Liechtenstein
- Height: 1.80 m (5 ft 11 in)
- Position: Midfielder

Senior career*
Years	Team	Apps	(Gls)
2000–2002	FC Schaan		
2002–2003	USV Eschen/Mauren		
2003–2007	VfB Hohenems		
2007–2008	FC Blau-Weiß Feldkirch	24	(5)
2008–2013	FC Balzers	71	(51)

International career^{‡}
2003–2009	Liechtenstein	43	(1)
- * Club domestic league appearances and goals as of 23 March 2018 ‡ National team caps and goals as of 10 November 2011

Roger Beck (born 3 August 1983) is a former international footballer from Liechtenstein who last played club football for FC Balzers, as a midfielder.

== Career ==
Beck formerly played for FC Schaan, USV Eschen/Mauren, VfB Hohenems and FC Blau-Weiß Feldkirch.

Beck earned 43 caps for Liechtenstein and scored one goal (in a Euro 2004 qualifier against Macedonia) between 2003 and 2009, including 16 FIFA World Cup qualifying matches.

== Career statistics ==
=== International ===
Appearances and goals by national team and year
National team	Year	Apps	Goals
Liechtenstein	2003	5	1
Liechtenstein	2004	9	0
Liechtenstein	2005	7	0
Liechtenstein	2006	5	0
Liechtenstein	2007	7	0
Liechtenstein	2008	3	0
Liechtenstein	2009	7	0
Total		43	1

Scores and results list Liechtenstein's goal tally first, score column indicates score after each Beck goal.

List of international goals scored by Roger Beck
No.	Date	Venue	Opponent	Score	Result	Competition
1	7 June 2003	City Park Stadium, Skopje, Macedonia	Macedonia	1–0	1–3	UEFA Euro 2004 qualification
