= George Xuereb =

Maltese footballer

Personal information
- Date of birth: 14 November 1953 (age 72)
- Place of birth: Marsa, Malta
- Position: Striker

Youth career
- 1968-1970: Floriana

Senior career*
Years	Team	Apps	(Gls)
1970–1980	Floriana		
1980–1987	Ħamrun Spartans		
1988–1990	Floriana		
1991–1996	Dingli Swallows		

International career^{‡}
1976–1985	Malta	30	(2)
1984	Malta XI	1	(0)
- * Club domestic league appearances and goals as of 29 June 2024 ‡ National team caps and goals as of 29 June 2024

George Xuereb (born 14 November 1953) is a retired footballer, who represented the Malta national team.

== Club career ==
During his career, he played as a forward for Floriana, Dingli Swallows and Ħamrun Spartans, making his debut Floriana in November 1970 against Marsa and playing his final game for the club in 1991 after he had come out of retirement after leaving Spartans. He had joined Spartans in the early 1980s among many other top players at the start of club president Victor Tedesco's reign.

== International career ==
Xuereb made his debut for Malta in an October 1976 World Cup qualification match away against Turkey and earned a total of 31 caps (including 1 unofficial), scoring 2 goals. His final international was a November 1985 World Cup qualification match against Sweden.

== Personal life ==
His brother Ray and son Aaron also played for the national team.
