= Donath Marxer =

Liechtensteiner footballer (born 1958)

Personal information
- Date of birth: 25 October 1958 (age 68)
- Place of birth: Eschen, Liechtenstein
- Position: Midfielder

Youth career
- –1977: Eschen/Mauren

Senior career*
Years	Team	Apps	(Gls)
1977–1980	Eschen/Mauren		
1980–1990	Vaduz		
1990–1993	Eschen/Mauren		

International career
1981–1990	Liechtenstein	5	(4)
- * Club domestic league appearances and goals

Donath Marxer, also spelt Donat Marxer, (born 25 October 1958) is a Liechtensteiner former footballer who played as a midfielder.

== Club career ==
Marxer spent his entire club career in Liechtenstein within the Swiss football league system. He was promoted to the senior team at Eschen/Mauren at the age of 18 in 1977 and he won the Liechtenstein Football Cup during his first two seasons at the club. In 1980, he joined 1. Liga Classic club Vaduz where he won a further four Liechtenstein Football Cup titles. He stayed at Vaduz until 1990 when he rejoined Eschen/Mauren before retiring in 1993.

== International career ==
Marxer made his debut for Liechtenstein on 14 June 1981 during the 1–1 draw against Malta in the 1981 President's Cup Football Tournament which was Liechtenstein's first international match. He scored Liechtenstein's first hat-trick on 22 June 1981 during the 3–2 victory against Indonesia in the same tournament (which was also his country's first ever victory), and he scored one more goal during the 4–1 defeat against the United States on 30 May 1990.

== Career statistics ==
=== International ===
Appearances and goals by national team and year
National team	Year	Apps	Goals
Liechtenstein	1981	3	3
Liechtenstein	1982	1	0
Liechtenstein	1983	—	
Liechtenstein	1984	1	0
Liechtenstein	1985	—	
Liechtenstein	1986	—	
Liechtenstein	1987	—	
Liechtenstein	1988	—	
Liechtenstein	1989	—	
Liechtenstein	1990	1	1
Total		5	4

Scores and results list Liechtenstein's goal tally first, score column indicates score after each Marxer goal.

List of international goals scored by Donath Marxer
No.	Date	Venue	Cap	Opponent	Score	Result	Competition	Ref.
1.	22 June 1981	Jeonju World Cup Stadium, Jeonju, South Korea	2	Indonesia	1–?	3–2	1981 President's Cup Football Tournament	
2.	22 June 1981	Jeonju World Cup Stadium, Jeonju, South Korea	2	Indonesia	2–?	3–2	1981 President's Cup Football Tournament	
3.	22 June 1981	Jeonju World Cup Stadium, Jeonju, South Korea	2	Indonesia	3–?	3–2	1981 President's Cup Football Tournament	
4.	30 May 1990	Sportpark Eschen-Mauren, Eschen, Liechtenstein	5	United States	1–1	1–4	Friendly	

== Honours ==
Eschen/Mauren

- Liechtenstein Football Cup: 1976–77, 1977–78; runner-up 1978–79

Vaduz

- Liechtenstein Football Cup: 1984–85, 1986, 1987–88, 1989–90; runner-up 1983–84, 1986–87
