= Jorge Caraballo =

Uruguayan footballer (born 1959)

Jorge Washington Caraballo Larrosa
Personal information
- Date of birth: May 5, 1959 (age 67)
- Place of birth: Treinta y Tres, Uruguay
- Position: Midfielder

Senior career*
Years	Team	Apps	(Gls)
1977	Central Español (Uruguay)		
1978–1982	Danubio (Uruguay)		
1982–1983	Pisa (Italy)		
1983–1986	Machala (Ecuador)		
1986–1988	Goiás (Brazil)		
1988–1990	Audaz Octubrino (Ecuador)		
1990–1991	Fernandez Vial (Chile)		
- * Club domestic league appearances and goals

Jorge Washington Caraballo Larrosa (born May 5, 1959) is a Uruguayan former football player who played in Uruguay, Italy, Ecuador, Brazil and Chile.
