= Dejvi Glavevski =

Macedonian footballer

Personal information
- Full name: Dejvi Glavevski; Дејви Главевски
- Date of birth: 17 November 1967 (age 58)
- Place of birth: Bitola, SR Macedonia, SFR Yugoslavia
- Position: Forward

Youth career
- Pelister

Senior career*
Years	Team	Apps	(Gls)
1985–1990	Pelister	63	(15)
1990–1992	Rad	15	(1)
1992–1993	Pelister	28	(3)
1993–1994	Tikveš	15	(3)
1994–1996	Pelister	28	(3)
1996–1998	Vejle	58	(13)
1998–1999	Pobeda	11	(1)
1999–2002	Pelister	39	(14)
2000	→ Randers (loan)	6	(1)
2001–2003	Pobeda	24	(6)

International career
1996–1997	Macedonia	4	(3)
- * Club domestic league appearances and goals

Dejvi Glavevski (Macedonian: Дејви Главевски; born 17 November 1967) is a retired Macedonian international football striker.

== Club career ==
His career started in 1985 in the Yugoslav Second League, playing with FK Pelister. In 1990, he made his debut in the Yugoslav First League when he moved to the Belgrade based club FK Rad. Two years later he returned to FK Pelister, now playing in the Macedonian First League. In 1996, he moved to Denmark to play in the Danish First Division club Vejle Boldklub where they were runners-up in 1997.

== International career ==
Glavevski was part of the Macedonian squad in the qualification matches for the 1998 FIFA World Cup. On 9 November 1996, he scored a hat-trick on his senior debut in their 11–1 rout of Liechtenstein in Eschen. His final international was a June 1997 FIFA World Cup qualification match against Iceland.

== International goals ==
No.	Date	Venue	Opponent	Score	Result	Competition
1.	9 November 1996	Sportpark Eschen-Mauren, Eschen, Liechtenstein	Liechtenstein	1–0	11–1	1998 FIFA World Cup qualification
2.	9 November 1996	Sportpark Eschen-Mauren, Eschen, Liechtenstein	Liechtenstein	2–0	11–1	1998 FIFA World Cup qualification
3.	9 November 1996	Sportpark Eschen-Mauren, Eschen, Liechtenstein	Liechtenstein	9–0	11–1	1998 FIFA World Cup qualification
