= Franz Schädler (footballer) =

Liechtenstein footballer

Personal information
- Date of birth: 3 February 1968 (age 58)
- Place of birth: Liechtenstein
- Position: Midfielder

Senior career*
Years	Team	Apps	(Gls)
1996–1997	FC Triesen		
1997–1998	FC Balzers		

International career
1995–1997	Liechtenstein	12	(1)
- * Club domestic league appearances and goals

Franz Schädler (born 3 February 1968) is a former Liechtenstein football midfielder.

Making his debut against Latvia in 1995, Schädler would go on to win 12 caps and score one goal for his country. He last played at the club level for FC Balzers.
