= Harry Zech =

Liechtenstein footballer

Personal information
- Date of birth: 25 February 1969 (age 57)
- Place of birth: Liechtenstein
- Position: Defender

Senior career*
Years	Team	Apps	(Gls)
1991–1997	FC Vaduz		
1997–2000	FC Balzers		
2000–2003	USV Eschen/Mauren		

International career
1991–2003	Liechtenstein	40	(1)
- * Club domestic league appearances and goals

Harry Zech (born 25 February 1969) is a former Liechtenstein football defender.

Making his debut against Switzerland in 1991, Zech would go on to win 40 caps and score one goal for his country. Zech was also the captain for much of his later years in the national squad. He last played at the club level for USV Eschen/Mauren.

Zech is also a winemaker, and is the proprietor of the Harry Zech Winebau Cantina in Schaanwald.

== Honours ==
Individual

- Liechtensteiner Footballer of the Year: 1995-1996

== International goals ==
#	Date	Venue	Opponent	Score	Result	Competition
1.	9 October 1996	Žalgiris Stadium, Vilnius, Lithuania	Lithuania	1-1	1-2	FIFA World Cup 1998 Qualifying
