= Knud Erik Fisker =

Danish football referee

- Born: 17 September 1960 (age 66)

Domestic
Years	League	Role
1993–2006	Danish Superliga	Referee

International
Years	League	Role
1994–2005	FIFA listed	Referee

Knud Erik Fisker (born 17 September 1960) is a Danish former football referee. He was a full international for FIFA since 1994 until 2005.
