= Michael Stocklasa =

Liechtensteiner footballer (born 1980)

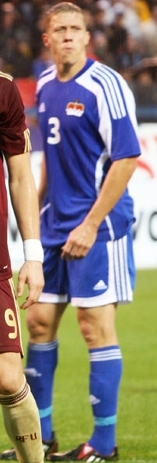
- Stocklasa with the Liechtenstein national team

Personal information
- Date of birth: 2 December 1980 (age 45)
- Place of birth: Triesen, Liechtenstein
- Height: 1.89 m (6 ft 2 in)
- Position: Defender

Senior career*
Years	Team	Apps	(Gls)
1997–1998	USV Eschen/Mauren		
1998–2000	FC Vaduz		
2000	FC Winterthur	4	(0)
2000–2002	FC Baden	35	(1)
2002–2006	FC Vaduz	76	(4)
2006–2012	USV Eschen/Mauren	73	(5)

International career
1998–2012	Liechtenstein	71	(2)
- * Club domestic league appearances and goals

Michael Stocklasa (born 2 December 1980) is a Liechtensteiner former professional footballer from Liechtenstein who played as a defender. He played club football for USV Eschen/Mauren, FC Vaduz, FC Winterthur, and FC Baden. He made 71 appearances for the Liechtenstein national team, scoring twice.

== Personal life ==
His brother Martin Stocklasa was also a professional footballer and represented Liechtenstein at international level.

== International career ==
Stocklasa played his final match for Liechtenstein in February 2012 before deciding to end his footballing days to focus on his business career.

== Career statistics ==
Scores and results list.

#	Date	Venue	Opponent	Score	Result	Competition
1.	8 September 2002	Rheinpark Stadion, Vaduz	North Macedonia	1–1	1–1	UEFA Euro 2004 Qualifying
2.	11 August 2010	Laugardalsvöllur, Reykjavík	Iceland	1–1	1–1	Friendly
Correct as of 9 June 2017
