= List of ŠK Slovan Bratislava seasons =

This is a list of the seasons played by Slovan Bratislava. The club's achievements in all major national and international competitions as well as the top scorers are listed. The list is separated into two parts, coinciding with the two major episodes of (Czecho-)Slovak football:

- From 1945–93 Slovan was part of the Czechoslovak league
- Since 1993 after the dissolution of Czechoslovakia Slovan has been taking part in the Slovak league

== Key ==
Key to colours and symbols:

1st or W	Winners
2nd or RU	Runners-up
	Current Season
↑	Promoted
↓	Relegated
	Top scorer in division

Key to league record:

- Pld = Matches played
- W = Matches won
- D = Matches drawn
- L = Matches lost
- GF = Goals scored
- GA = Goals against
- Pts = Points
- % = Percentage of points earned out of the total possible number of points
- Pos = Final position

Key to cup record:

- NH = Not held
- QR = Qualifying round
- QR1 = First qualifying round
- QR2 = Second qualifying round, etc.
- PO = Play-off round
- GS = Group stage
- LP = League phase
- R1 = First round
- R2 = Second round, etc.
- R16 = Round of 16
- QF = Quarter-finals
- SF = Semi-finals
- RU = Runners-up
- W = Winners

== 1945–1993 ==
Season	League										Slovak Cup	Czechoslovak Cup	UEFA					Top scorer(s) (Note: Domestic league goals only.)	Goals
Season	League tier	Pld	W	D	L	GF	GA	Pts	%	Pos	Slovak Cup	Czechoslovak Cup	CL	EL	ECL	CWC	IC	Top scorer(s)	Goals
1945–46	1	18	9	3	6	54	41	21	58.3	3rd	NH	NH	NH	NH	NH	NH	NH	Korostelev	17
1946–47	1	26	13	2	11	78	48	28	53.8	6th	NH	NH	NH	NH	NH	NH	NH	Arpáš	18
1947–48	1	20	10	4	6	57	31	24	60.0	3rd	NH	NH	NH	NH	NH	NH	NH	Šimanský	16
1948	1	13	4	3	6	20	22	11	42.3	10th	NH	NH	NH	NH	NH	NH	NH	Tegelhoff	5
1949	1	26	18	5	3	93	33	41	78.8	1st	NH	NH	NH	NH	NH	NH	NH	Preis	24
1950	1	26	16	3	7	62	35	35	67.3	1st	NH	NH	NH	NH	NH	NH	NH	Laskov	12
1951	1	26	14	5	7	58	36	33	63.4	1st	NH	NH	NH	NH	NH	NH	NH	Malatinský	14
1952	1	26	18	4	4	59	25	40	76.9	2nd	NH	NH	NH	NH	NH	NH	NH	Pažický	10
1953	1	13	5	3	5	26	21	13	50.0	9th	NH	NH	NH	NH	NH	NH	NH	Čurgaly / Pažický	9
1954	1	22	10	5	7	35	28	25	56.8	5th	NH	NH	NH	NH	NH	NH	NH	Pažický	9
1955	1	22	13	5	4	41	14	31	70.4	1st	NH	NH		NH	NH	NH	NH	Pažický	19 (11 for Slovan)
1956	1	22	10	7	5	37	23	27	61.3	2nd	NH	NH	R1	NH	NH	NH	NH	Moravčík	10
1957–58	1	33	15	7	11	58	45	37	56.0	4th	NH	NH		NH	NH	NH	NH	Moravčík	13
1958–59	1	26	8	8	10	38	36	24	46.1	8th	NH	NH		NH	NH	NH	NH	Moravčík	9
1959–60	1	26	12	8	6	53	31	32	61.5	2nd	NH	NH		NH	NH	NH	NH	Moravčík	13
1960–61	1	26	12	5	9	45	29	29	55.7	3rd	NH			NH	NH		NH	Popluhár / Moravčík	10
1961–62	1	26	13	1	12	51	38	27	51.9	7th	NH	W		NH	NH		NH	Obert	12
1962–63	1	26	10	5	11	45	40	25	48.0	7th	NH	W		NH	NH	QF	NH	Cvetler	11
1963–64	1	26	14	7	5	50	25	35	67.3	2nd	NH	QF		NH	NH	QF	NH	Obert / Cvetler	9
1964–65	1	26	7	14	5	35	26	28	53.8	6th	NH	RU		NH	NH		NH	Cvetler	7
1965–66	1	26	9	7	10	34	29	25	48.0	7th	NH	SF		NH	NH		NH	Hrdlička	10
1966–67	1	26	14	7	5	33	17	35	67.3	2nd	NH	R1		NH	NH		NH	Jokl	8
1967–68	1	26	13	4	9	36	20	30	57.6	2nd	NH	W		NH	NH		NH	Jokl / Cvetler	6
1968–69	1	26	12	10	4	35	18	34	65.3	2nd	NH	R3		NH	NH	W	NH	Móder	8
1969–70	1	30	16	11	3	39	15	43	71.6	1st	W	RU		NH	NH	R1	NH	Jokl	10
1970–71	1	30	11	10	9	34	28	32	53.3	6th	RU		R2	NH	NH		NH	Čapkovič	9
1971–72	1	30	18	6	6	68	37	42	70.0	2nd	W	RU			NH		NH	Čapkovič	19
1972–73	1	30	12	5	13	32	31	29	48.3	8th	QF			R2	NH		NH	Čapkovič	8
1973–74	1	30	15	7	8	58	39	37	61.6	1st	W	W			NH		NH	Čapkovič	14
1974–75	1	30	16	7	7	72	34	39	65.0	1st	SF		R1		NH		NH	Čapkovič	16
1975–76	1	30	15	6	9	49	25	36	60.0	2nd	W	RU	R1		NH		NH	Švehlík	9
1976–77	1	30	12	5	13	44	38	29	48.3	8th	R4			R2	NH		NH	Novotný	11
1977–78	1	30	11	7	12	53	46	29	48.3	8th	RU				NH		NH	Galis	15
1978–79	1	30	8	12	10	35	32	28	46.6	10th	SF				NH		NH	Švehlík / Masný	8
1979–80	1	30	11	7	12	31	35	29	48.3	11th	SF				NH		NH	Galis / Masný	8
1980–81	1	30	12	5	13	40	38	29	48.3	9th	R3				NH		NH	Masný	16
1981–82	1	30	11	7	12	42	47	29	48.3	10th	W	W			NH		NH	Masný	10
1982–83	1	30	8	10	12	34	51	26	43.3	13th	W	RU			NH	R1	NH	Frič	8
1983–84	1	30	8	11	11	45	46	27	45.0	9th	R3				NH		NH	Bechera	11
1984–85	1 ↓	30	6	7	17	24	59	19	31.6	16th	SF				NH		NH	Cabadaj / Horný	5
1985–86	2	30	17	8	5	45	23	42	70.0	2nd	R3				NH		NH	Ducký	10
1986–87	2	30	20	5	5	60	17	45	75.0	2nd	SF				NH		NH	Ducký	12
1987–88	2 ↑	30	19	7	4	51	18	45	75.0	1st	QF				NH		NH	Hirko / Ducký	9
1988–89	1	30	13	4	13	41	39	30	50.0	7th	W	RU			NH		NH	Vankovič	18
1989–90	1	30	10	15	5	29	25	35	58.3	5th	QF				NH	R1	NH	Juriga / Pecko	5
1990–91	1	30	16	6	8	47	27	38	63.3	2nd	SF				NH		NH	Hirko	9
1991–92	1	30	23	5	2	60	19	51	85.0	1st	SF			R1	NH		NH	Dubovský	27
1992–93	1	30	19	4	7	61	31	42	70.0	3rd	R3		R2		NH		NH	Dubovský	24
Season	Tier	Pld	W	D	L	GF	GA	Pts	%	Pos	Slovak Cup	Czechoslovak Cup	CL	EL	ECL	CWC	IC	Top scorer(s)	Goals
Season	League										Slovak Cup	Czechoslovak Cup	UEFA					Top scorer(s)	Goals

== Since 1993 ==
Table correct as of 16 May 2026

Season	League										Slovak Cup	Super Cup	UEFA					Top scorer(s) (Note: Domestic league goals only.)	Goals
Season	Tier	Pld	W	D	L	GF	GA	Pts	%	Pos	Slovak Cup	Super Cup	CL	EL	ECL	CWC	IC	Top scorer(s)	Goals
1993–94	1	32	20	10	2	63	28	50	78.1	1st	W	W		R1	NH (Note: The competition was first contested in the 2021–22 season.)		NH (Note: The competition was founded in 1961, but was only taken over by UEFA in 1995. It was abolished after the 2008 tournament.)	Nigro	12
1994–95	1	32	21	9	2	63	25	72	75.0	1st	QF	W		R2	NH		NH	Maixner / Faktor	9
1995–96	1	32	22	9	1	79	20	75	78.1	1st	R2	RU		R1	NH			Németh	12
1996–97	1	30	15	5	10	49	33	50	55.6	3rd	W	W		QR	NH			Németh	13
1997–98	1	30	12	9	9	41	36	45	50.0	5th	R1	RU			NH	R1		Medveď	8
1998–99	1	30	21	7	2	56	11	70	77.8	1st	W				NH			Jančula / Hrnčár / Majoroš	9
1999–2000	1	30	16	9	5	52	18	57	63.3	3rd	R1	NH	QR2		NH	NH (Note: The competition was abolished after the 1998–99 season and merged into the UEFA Cup (now the UEFA Europa League).)		Varga	9
2000–01	1	36	21	8	7	84	49	71	65.7	2nd	R2	NH		R1	NH	NH		Meszároš	18
2001–02	1	36	14	9	13	42	39	51	47.2	6th	R2	NH		R1	NH	NH		Vittek	14
2002–03	1	36	19	6	11	60	42	63	58.3	3rd	RU				NH	NH		Vittek	19
2003–04	1 ↓	36	6	11	19	37	58	29	26.9	10th	R1				NH	NH		Onofrej	9
2004–05	2	30	14	8	8	37	24	50	55.6	3rd	QF				NH	NH		Sloboda	5
2005–06	2 ↑	30	19	6	5	47	25	63	70.0	2nd	R1				NH	NH		Masaryk	11
2006–07	1	28	11	8	9	35	33	41	48.8	3rd	R2	NH			NH	NH		Masaryk	14
2007–08	1	33	15	6	12	46	37	51	51.5	5th	QF				NH	NH	R2	Masaryk / Slovák / Meszároš / Sylvestr	6
2008–09	1	33	21	7	5	69	25	70	70.7	1st	SF	NH			NH	NH		Masaryk	15
2009–10	1	33	21	7	5	54	24	70	70.7	2nd	W	W	QR3	PO	NH	NH	NH	Halenár	11
2010–11	1	33	20	8	5	63	22	68	68.7	1st	W	RU		PO	NH	NH	NH	Šebo	22
2011–12	1	33	16	11	6	48	35	59	59.6	3rd	QF	NH	QR3	GS	NH	NH	NH	Halenár	15
2012–13	1	33	16	11	6	56	33	59	59.6	1st	W	NH		QR2	NH	NH	NH	Peltier	10
2013–14	1	33	24	3	6	63	32	75	75.8	1st	RU	NH	QR2		NH	NH	NH	Fořt / Vittek	12
2014–15	1	33	18	3	12	49	42	57	57.6	3rd	QF	W	PO	GS	NH	NH	NH	Soumah / Milinković	8
2015–16	1	33	20	9	4	50	25	69	69.7	2nd	RU	NH		QR3	NH	NH	NH	Priskin	12
2016–17	1	30	18	3	9	54	34	57	63.3	2nd	W	NH		QR2	NH	NH	NH	Soumah (Note: Joint top scorer with Filip Hlohovský of Žilina.)	20
2017–18	1	32	17	8	7	58	37	59	61.5	2nd	W	NH		QR2	NH	NH	NH	Mareš / Čavrić	12
2018–19	1	32	25	5	2	84	33	80	83.3	1st	R2	NH		QR3	NH	NH	NH	Šporar	29
2019–20	1	27	21	5	1	57	14	68	84.0	1st	W	NH	QR1	GS	NH	NH	NH	Šporar	12
2020–21	1	32	22	5	5	78	28	71	74.0	1st	W	NH	QR1	QR2	NH	NH	NH	Ratão	14
2021–22	1	32	22	8	2	71	25	74	77.1	1st	RU	NH	QR2	PO	GS	NH	NH	Henty	9
2022–23	1	32	21	6	5	65	32	69	71.9	1st	RU	NH	QR2	QR3	R16	NH	NH	Čavrić	15
2023–24	1	32	23	4	5	76	31	73	76.0	1st	QF	NH	QR3	PO	R32	NH	NH	Barseghyan	15
2024–25	1	32	22	6	4	74	39	72	75.0	1st	SF	NH	LP			NH	NH	Barseghyan / Strelec	20
2025–26	1	32	21	5	6	62	37	68	70.8	1st	R16	NH	QR3	PO	LP	NH	NH	Šporar	12
Season	Tier	Pld	W	D	L	GF	GA	Pts	%	Pos	Slovak Cup	Super Cup	CL	EL	ECL	CWC	IC	Top scorer(s)	Goals
Season	League										Slovak Cup	Super Cup	UEFA					Top scorer(s)	Goals
