= 2023 Slovak Cup final =

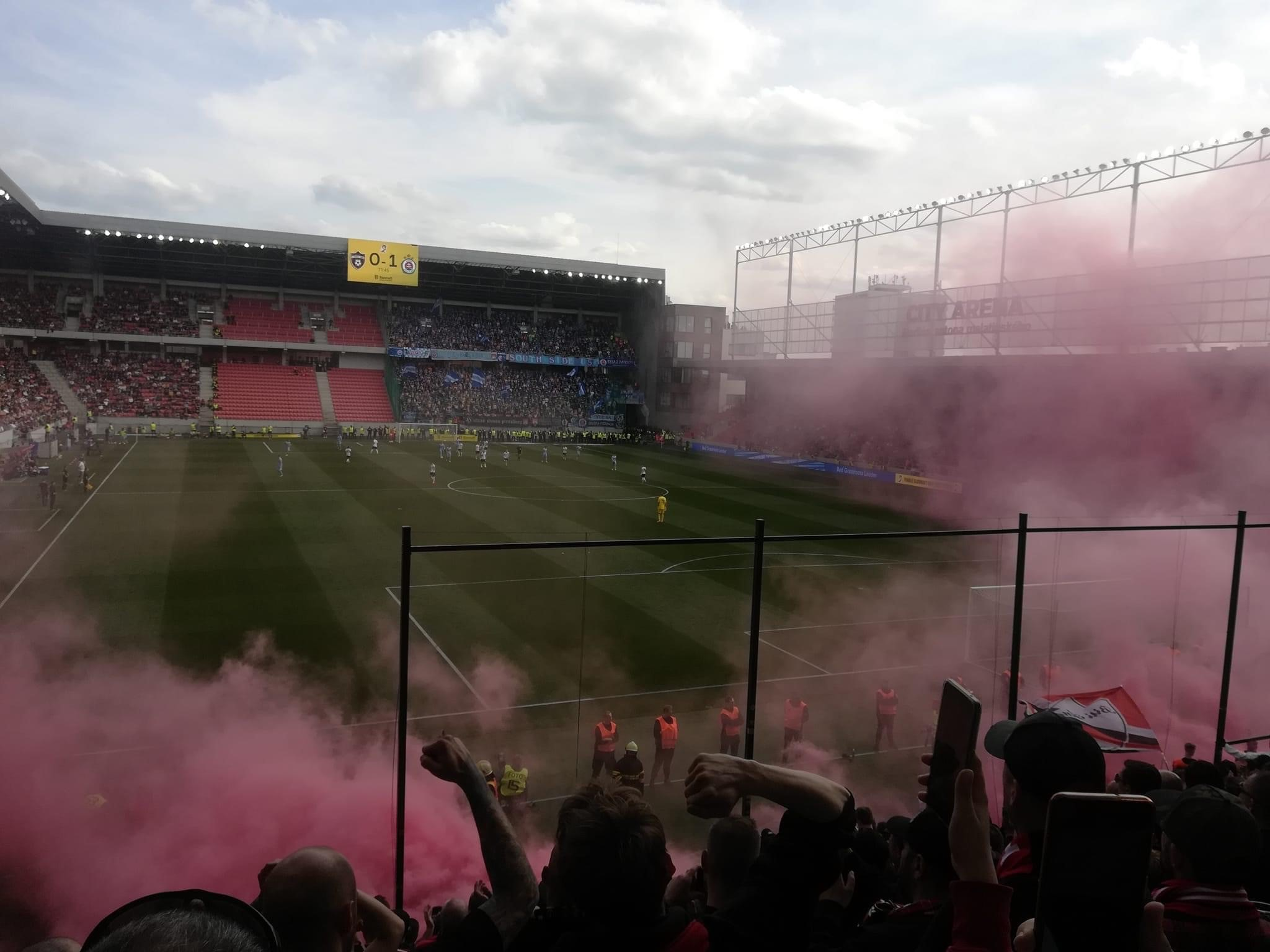
- Both sets of fans during the final
- Event: 2022–23 Slovak Cup
Spartak Trnava	Slovan Bratislava
3	1
- Date: 1 May 2023
- Venue: Anton Malatinský Stadium, Trnava
- Referee: Michal Očenáš
- Attendance: 15,427

The 2023 Slovak Cup final (known as the Slovnaft Cup for sponsorship reasons) was the final match of the 2022–23 Slovak Cup, the 54th season of the top cup competition in Slovak football. It was played at the Anton Malatinský Stadium in Trnava, Slovakia, on 1 May 2023.

It was contested by the defending champions Spartak Trnava and Slovan Bratislava. Interestingly, these teams also met in the 2022 final, and then Slovan Bratislava played at their home stadium. In total, it was the sixth final since the competition was established, in which the fierce rivals met. Trnava won the match 3–1 after extra time, after the game finished 1–1 in 90 minutes.

== Teams ==
In the following table, finals until 1993 were in the Czechoslovak era, since 1994 were in the Slovak era.

Team	Previous final appearances (bold indicates winners)
Spartak Trnava	14 (**1971**, 1972, 1974, **1975**, **1980**, 1988, **1991**, 1996, **1998**, 2006, 2008, 2010, **2019**, **2022**)
Slovan Bratislava	23 (**1970**, 1971, **1972**, **1974**, **1976**, 1978, **1982**, **1983**, **1989**, **1994**, **1997**, **1999**, 2003, **2010**, **2011**, **2013**, 2014, 2016, **2017**, **2018**, **2020**, **2021**, 2022)

== Road to the final ==
Note: In all results below, the score of the finalist is given first (H: home; A: away; N: neutral venue).

Spartak Trnava (1)		Round	Slovan Bratislava (1)
Opponent	Result	2022–23 Slovak Cup	Opponent	Result
Bye		Preliminary round	Bye
Bye		First round	Bye
Slavoj Boleráz (4)	1–1 (4–2 p) (A)	Second round	Branč (5)	2–0 (A)
Trenčianske Stankovce (5)	6–0 (A)	Third round	Družstevník Malá Mača (6)	7–0 (A)
Sereď (3)	3–0 (A)	Fourth round	Stropkov (3)	3–2 (A)
Zemplín Michalovce (1)	2–2 (4–3 p) (H)	Round of 16	Dukla Banská Bystrica (1)	2–1 (A)
Komárno (2)	2–0 (A)	Quarter-finals	ŠTK Šamorín (2)	1–1 (4–3 p) (N)
Trenčín (1)	2–1 (A), 3–0 (H) (5–1 agg.)	Semi-finals	Skalica (1)	2–1 (H), 3–3 (a.e.t.) (A) (5–4 agg.)

== Match ==
=== Details ===
1 May 2023
15:00 (UTC+2)

Spartak Trnava	3–1 (a.e.t.)	Slovan Bratislava
Taiwo 85'; Paur 110'; Twardzik 120+5' (pen.)	Report	Green 57'

Anton Malatinský Stadium, Trnava
Attendance: 15,427
Referee: Michal Očenáš

GK	72	(Slovakia) Martin Vantruba
RB	24	(Slovakia) Kristián Koštrna
CB	2	(Slovakia) Lukáš Štetina
CB	26	(Slovakia) Sebastian Kóša		(substituted off) 72'
LB	33	(Czech Republic) Filip Twardzik
CM	28	(Slovakia) Martin Bukata		(substituted off) 80'
CM	88	(Greece) Kyriakos Savvidis
CM	15	(Slovakia) Roman Procházka (c)		(substituted off) 80'
RW	91	(Ghana) Kelvin Ofori	(yellow card) 94'	(substituted off) 116'
CF	12	(Nigeria) Abdulrahman Taiwo	(yellow card) 80'	(substituted off) 120+2'
LW	23	(Czech Republic) Erik Daniel		(substituted off) 106'
Substitutes:
GK	71	(Slovakia) Dominik Takáč
FW	7	(North Macedonia) Milan Ristovski	(yellow card) 89'	(substituted in) 72'
MF	8	(Slovakia) Samuel Štefánik		(substituted in) 120+2'
MF	17	(Slovakia) Jakub Paur	(yellow card) 116'	(substituted in) 80'
MF	20	(Nigeria) Azeez Oseni
MF	21	(Slovakia) Patrick Karhan
MF	22	(Slovakia) Alex Iván		(substituted in) 116'
DF	77	(Nigeria) Kazeem Bolaji		(substituted in) 106'
MF	91	(Brazil) Dyjan de Azevedo		(substituted in) 80'
Manager:
(Slovakia) Michal Gašparík

GK	31	(Slovakia) Martin Trnovský
RB	17	(Czech Republic) Jurij Medveděv	(yellow card) 67'	(substituted off) 115'
CB	4	(Georgia (country)) Guram Kashia
CB	81	(Slovakia) Vernon De Marco (c)
LB	25	(Slovakia) Lukáš Pauschek		(substituted off) 115'
DM	20	(Georgia (country)) Jaba Kankava
DM	33	(Slovakia) Juraj Kucka
RM	19	(England) Andre Green	(yellow card) 80'	(substituted off) 84'
AM	10	(Georgia (country)) Giorgi Chakvetadze		(substituted off) 84'
LM	23	(Ghana) Zuberu Sharani		(substituted off) 66'
CF	77	(Serbia) Aleksandar Čavrić		(substituted off) 99'
Substitutes:
GK	1	(Slovakia) Adrián Chovan
DF	2	(Netherlands) Siemen Voet
MF	3	(Nigeria) Uche Henry Agbo	(yellow card) 120'	(substituted in) 84'
DF	5	(Slovakia) Richard Križan
MF	11	(Armenia) Tigran Barseghyan		(substituted in) 99'
FW	15	(Ghana) Malik Abubakari		(substituted in) 84'
MF	21	(Czech Republic) Jaromír Zmrhal		(substituted in) 66'
MF	26	(Slovakia) Filip Lichý		(substituted in) 115'
DF	36	(Brazil) Lucas Lovat		(substituted in) 115'
Manager:
(Slovakia) Vladimír Weiss

Assistant referees:
Branislav Hancko
Adam Jekkel
Fourth official:
Erik Gemzický
Video assistant referee:
Boris Marhefka
Assistant video assistant referee:
František Ferenc

**Match rules**

- 90 minutes.
- 30 minutes of extra time if necessary.
- Penalty shoot-out if scores still level.

== See also ==
- 2022–23 Slovak Cup
- 2023–24 UEFA Europa Conference League
- Traditional derby
