= 2022 Slovak Cup final =

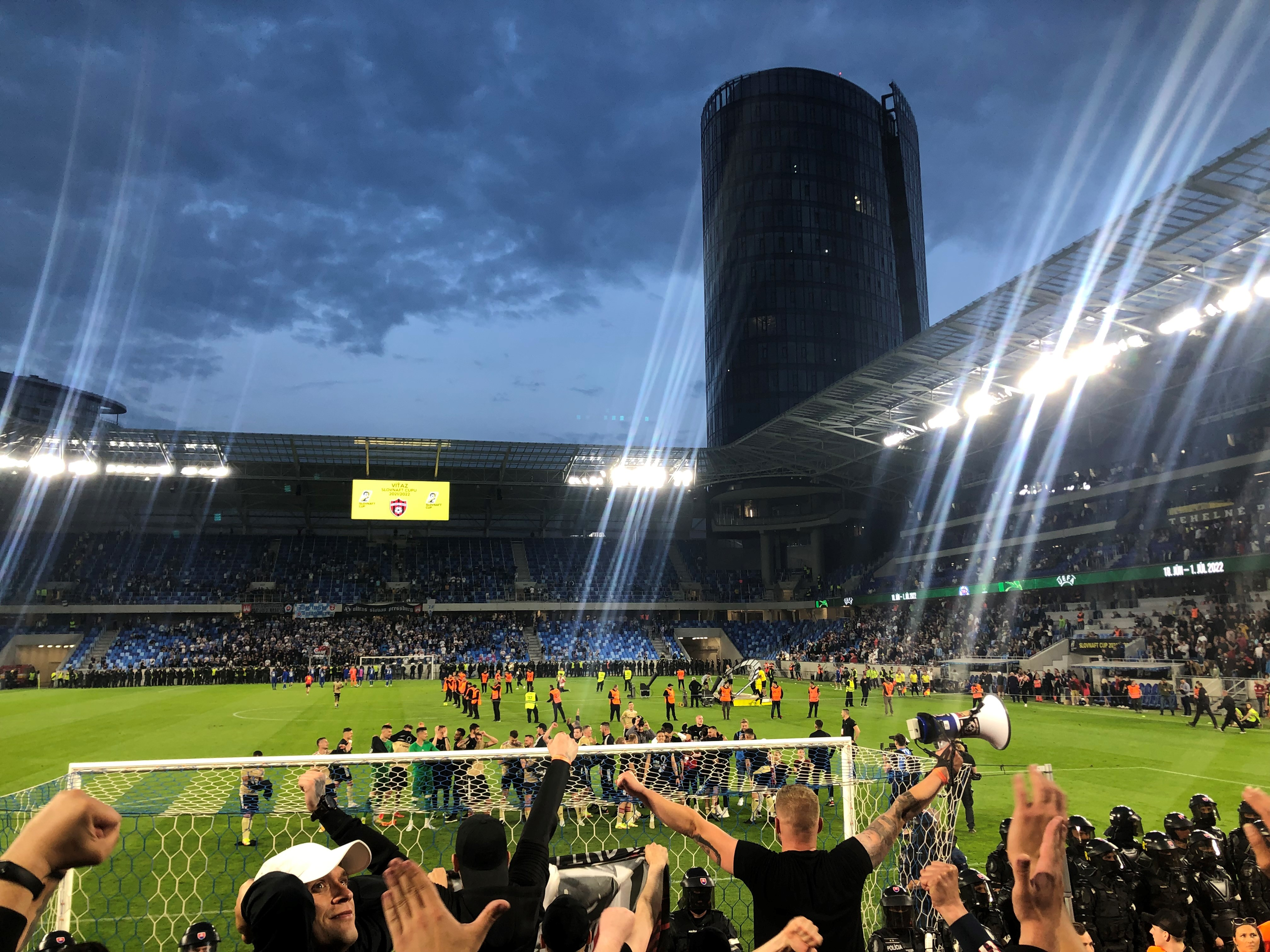
- Spartak Trnava fans celebrating with players
- Event: 2021–22 Slovak Cup
Slovan Bratislava	Spartak Trnava
1	2
- Date: 8 May 2022
- Venue: Tehelné pole, Bratislava
- Referee: Peter Ziemba
- Attendance: 10,411

The 2022 Slovak Cup final (known as the Slovnaft Cup for sponsorship reasons) was the final match of the 2021–22 Slovak Cup, the 53rd season of the top cup competition in Slovak football. The match was played at the Tehelné pole in Bratislava on 8 May 2022, contested by ŠK Slovan Bratislava and FC Spartak Trnava. It was only the fifth time since the foundation of the competition in 1969 and the first time since 2010 that the biggest rivals in Slovak football met in the final.

== Teams ==
In the following table, finals until 1993 were in the Czechoslovak era, since 1994 were in the Slovak era.

Team	Previous final appearances (bold indicates winners)
Slovan Bratislava	22 (**1970**, 1971, **1972**, **1974**, **1976**, 1978, **1982**, **1983**, **1989**, **1994**, **1997**, **1999**, 2003, **2010**, **2011**, **2013**, 2014, 2016, **2017**, **2018**, **2020**, **2021**)
Spartak Trnava	13 (**1971**, 1972, 1974, **1975**, **1980**, 1988, **1991**, 1996, **1998**, 2006, 2008, 2010, **2019**)

== Road to the final ==
Note: In all results below, the score of the finalist is given first (H: home; A: away; N: neutral venue).

Slovan Bratislava (1)		Round	Spartak Trnava (1)
Opponent	Result	2021–22 Slovak Cup	Opponent	Result
Jednota Málinec (4)	7–0 (A)	Second Round	Beluša (3)	3–0 (A)
Prameň Kováčová (3)	2–0 (A)	Third Round	Pata (4)	4–0 (A)
Slávia TU Košice (3)	5–0 (A)	Fourth Round	Železiarne Podbrezová (2)	2–2 (7–6 p) (A)
Ružomberok (1)	2–0 (A)	Round of 16	Košice (2)	2–1 (A)
Zlaté Moravce (1)	2–0 (H)	Quarter-finals	Žilina (1)	0–0 (4–1 p) (A)
Trenčín (1)	0–0 (A), 2–1 (H) (2–1 agg.)	Semi-finals	Senica (1)	3–0 (H), 4–0 (A) (7–0 agg.)

== Match ==
=== Details ===
8 May 2022
17:30 (UTC+2)

Slovan Bratislava	1–2 (a.e.t.)	Spartak Trnava
Mustafić 49'	Report	Bukata 52'; Azevedo 114'

Tehelné pole, Bratislava
Attendance: 10,411
Referee: Peter Ziemba

GK	1	(Slovakia) Adrián Chovan
RB	18	(Slovakia) David Hrnčár
CB	14	(Suriname) Myenty Abena	(yellow card) 120'
CB	4	(Georgia (country)) Guram Kashia
LB	81	(Slovakia) Vernon De Marco		(substituted off) 116'
DM	20	(Georgia (country)) Jaba Kankava	(yellow card) 67'
RM	77	(Serbia) Aleksandar Čavrić		(substituted off) 10'
CM	10	(Nigeria) Rabiu Ibrahim (c)
CM	16	(Bosnia and Herzegovina) Alen Mustafić	(yellow card) 56'	(substituted off) 112'
LM	7	(Slovakia) Vladimír Weiss		(substituted off) 76'
CF	9	(Serbia) Ivan Šaponjić	(yellow card) 102'	(substituted off) 112'
Substitutes:
GK	22	(Slovakia) Matúš Ružinský
MF	3	(Nigeria) Uche Henry Agbo
MF	8	(Hungary) David Holman		(substituted in) 112'
MF	11	(Armenia) Tigran Barseghyan	(yellow card) 66'	(substituted in) 10'
MF	19	(England) Andre Green		(substituted in) 76'
MF	21	(Czech Republic) Jaromír Zmrhal		(substituted in) 112'
DF	25	(Slovakia) Lukáš Pauschek
FW	28	(Brazil) Adler Da Silva		(substituted in) 116'
DF	29	(Bulgaria) Vasil Bozhikov
Manager:
(Slovakia) Vladimír Weiss

GK	71	(Slovakia) Dominik Takáč	(yellow card) 120'
CB	19	(Slovakia) Matej Čurma	(yellow card) 120'
CB	37	(Slovakia) Martin Škrtel (c)	(yellow card) 54'
CB	3	(Slovakia) Gergely Tumma	(yellow card) 103'
RM	28	(Slovakia) Martin Bukata	(yellow card) 69'	(substituted off) 90'
CM	88	(Greece) Kyriakos Savvidis	(yellow card) 54'	(substituted off) 106'
CM	8	(Slovakia) Jakub Grič	(yellow card) 120'
CM	15	(Slovakia) Roman Procházka		(substituted off) 115'
LM	29	(Slovakia) Martin Mikovič		(substituted off) 70'
FW	7	(North Macedonia) Milan Ristovski
FW	25	(Nigeria) Bamidele Yusuf		(substituted off) 106'
Substitutes:
GK	1	(Slovakia) Ľuboš Kamenár
MF	6	(Poland) Miłosz Kozak		(substituted in) 70'
MF	11	(Slovakia) Alex Iván		(substituted in) 106'
MF	17	(Syria) Ammar Ramadan
DF	24	(Slovakia) Kristián Koštrna		(substituted in) 90'
DF	26	(Slovakia) Sebastian Kóša		(substituted in) 115'
MF	30	(Slovakia) Ján Vlasko
FW	45	(Slovakia) Stanislav Olejník
MF	91	(Brazil) Dyjan de Azevedo	(yellow card) 114'	(substituted in) 106'
Manager:
(Slovakia) Michal Gašparík

Assistant referees:
Tomáš Vorel
Erik Weiss
Fourth official:
Erik Gemzický
Video assistant referee:
Michal Očenáš
Assistant video assistant referee:
Branislav Hancko

**Match rules**

- 90 minutes.
- 30 minutes of extra time if necessary.
- Penalty shoot-out if scores still level.

== See also ==
- 2021–22 Slovak Cup
- 2022–23 UEFA Europa Conference League
- Traditional derby
