= Soral (surname) =

Soral is a surname. Notable people with the surname include:

- Alain Soral (born 1958), Swiss essayist
- Agnès Soral (born 1960), Swiss actress and writer
- Bensu Soral (born 1991), Turkish-Cypriot actress
- Hande Soral (born 1987), Turkish-Cypriot actress
- Pavol Šoral (1903–1977), Slovak football player
