= Vladimír Weiss (footballer, born 1964) =

Slovak football coach and former player (born 1964)

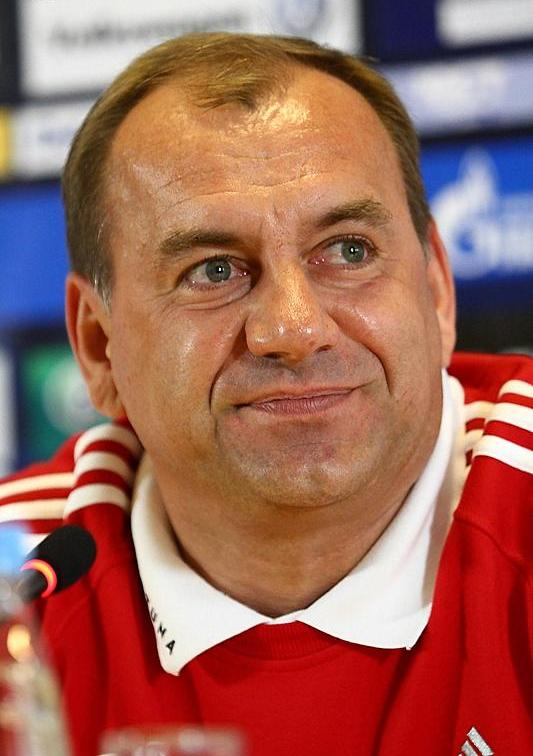
- Weiss in 2010

Personal information
- Date of birth: 22 September 1964 (age 62)
- Place of birth: Bratislava, Czechoslovakia
- Height: 1.82 m (6 ft 0 in)
- Position: Midfielder

Team information
- Current team: Slovakia (manager)

Youth career
- 1976–1983: Rapid Bratislava
- 1983–1984: ČH Bratislava

Senior career*
Years	Team	Apps	(Gls)
1984–1986	Agro Hurbanovo		
1986–1993	Inter Bratislava	126	(28)
1993	Sparta Praha	4	(1)
1993	Petra Drnovice	14	(2)
1994	DAC Dunajská Streda	31	(4)
1995–1996	1. FC Košice	24	(1)
1996–2000	Artmedia Petržalka	59	(7)
Total		258	(43)

International career
1988–1990	Czechoslovakia	19	(1)
1994–1995	Slovakia	12	(1)

Managerial career
- 1999–2006: Artmedia Petržalka
- 2006–2007: Saturn Moscow Oblast
- 2007–2008: Artmedia Petržalka
- 2008–2012: Slovakia
- 2011–2012: Slovan Bratislava
- 2012–2015: Kairat
- 2016–2020: Georgia
- 2021–2026: Slovan Bratislava
- 2026–: Slovakia
- * Club domestic league appearances and goals

Vladimír Weiss (born 22 September 1964) is a Slovak football coach and former player who serves as the coach of Slovakia National Team. He is one of a small number of people to have appeared as a player and a coach at a FIFA World Cup.

Weiss played in the Czechoslovak First League during the 1980s and start of the 1990s until its dissolution, making over 100 league appearances for Inter Bratislava. During this period, he played for Czechoslovakia, making 19 appearances and scoring one goal whilst participating at the 1990 FIFA World Cup as well. Following the dissolution of Czechoslovakia, Weiss played for Petra Drnovice in the Czech First League, then returned to Slovakia, playing for Košice, Dunajská Streda, and Petržalka. He made 12 further national team appearances, this time for Slovakia, scoring one goal.

Weiss moved into management at the turn of the century, and won the Slovak league title in 2005 with Artmedia Petržalka before taking them to the group stage of the UEFA Champions League, a feat only achieved by the manager of one Slovak club before. He spent a year managing Russian side Saturn Moscow Oblast before returning to Petržalka, where he won another national title in the 2007–08 season, as well as the 2007–08 Slovak Cup for a double.

In 2008, Weiss was named as the manager for the Slovakia national team. He subsequently took Slovakia to 2010 FIFA World Cup, their first World Cup as an independent nation, where they progressed from the group stage to the knockout stage of the tournament. He stepped down in 2012 having failed to qualify for the next major tournament, and managed Slovak club side Slovan Bratislava before moving to Kazakhstan, where he led Kairat for three years. During his time at Kairat, Weiss won the Kazakhstan Cup twice. Weiss subsequently led the Georgia national team between 2016 and 2020, narrowly missing out on qualification for UEFA Euro 2020. He returned to managing in the Slovak First Football League, signing a long-term contract with Slovan Bratislava in 2021, where he won four league titles in a row.

== Early life ==
The oldest of two siblings, Weiss' mother died when he was 15 years old, and he and his sister Zuzana were solely raised by their father. As a young man in the Czechoslovak Socialist Republic, Weiss completed his compulsory military service in Komárno.

== Playing career ==
Weiss began his career with Agro Hurbanovo and Rapid Bratislava. He played in the Czechoslovak First League for Inter Bratislava between the 1983–84 and 1992–93 seasons. After his final season for the club, Weiss played for AC Sparta Prague, who won the league title that season. He played for Petra Drnovice at the start of the 1993–94 season, the first season of the independent Czech league after the dissolution of Czechoslovakia. Weiss next returned to Slovakia, playing for Košice, Dunajská Streda, and Petržalka in the newly-established Slovak First League.

Weiss made 19 appearances for Czechoslovakia between 1988 and 1990, debuting in a 2–0 friendly loss against Bulgaria in March 1988. His first goal came against Norway in a November 1988 friendly match at Bratislava's Tehelné pole stadium, scoring Czechoslovakia's second goal in a 3–2 win. He played at the 1990 FIFA World Cup.

Following the dissolution of Czechoslovakia, Weiss played for Slovakia. He scored Slovakia's first goal after independence in a 1–0 friendly victory against United Arab Emirates on 2 February 1994, going on to represent Slovakia a total of 12 times.

== Managerial career ==
=== Artmedia Bratislava ===
As the coach of Artmedia Bratislava, Weiss won the Slovak First League in 2005. He then took the club through three qualifying rounds of the 2005–06 season of the UEFA Champions League and reached the group stage, becoming just the second Slovak team to qualify for the Champions League group stage after Košice in 1997. He moved to Russia and managed FC Saturn Moscow Oblast from February 2006 to June 2007. He then led Artmedia to another Slovak league title and cup double in 2008.

=== Slovakia ===
In July 2008, Weiss was appointed head coach of the Slovakia national team, taking over from Ján Kocian. On 14 October 2009, he led the team to the historic success of Slovakia's first-ever qualification for a major tournament as an independent nation, winning the qualifying group for the 2010 FIFA World Cup after a 1–0 away victory against Poland in the final qualifying match. This led to him being awarded in the Sport category of the 2009 Crystal Wing Awards.

On 24 June 2010, Weiss led Slovakia to the round of 16 after a 3–2 victory against Italy. In late January 2012, he resigned with Slovakia following the team's failure to qualify for UEFA Euro 2012.

Weiss continued as coach of Slovan Bratislava, having started that job alongside that of the Slovakia national team in August 2011. In July 2012, he signed a new one-year contract to continue. However, by the end of the month, Slovan had won just one of three league matches and been eliminated from the preliminary rounds of the UEFA Europa League. Weiss announced his resignation on 29 July.

=== Kazakhstan and Georgia ===
Weiss became coach of Almaty-based Kazakh football club FC Kairat in 2012, but resigned at the end of November 2015, having won the Kazakhstan Cup twice during his tenure. He became coach of the Georgia national team in March 2016. Weiss announced his resignation in November 2020 after Georgia lost the UEFA Euro 2020 qualifying play-offs to North Macedonia.

=== Return to Slovan Bratislava ===
Weiss returned to Slovakia, signing a five-year contract with former club Slovan Bratislava in May 2021. Slovan won the 2020–21 league title in his first game after a 4–0 away victory against Zlaté Moravce. Under Weiss, Slovan won the league again in 2021–22 and 2022–23 for three league titles in a row.

In April 2024, Slovan Bratislava won their sixth consecutive league title, and a fourth for Weiss. On 28 August, during the 2024–25 UEFA Champions League play-off round, he led the club to their first final tournament in an eventual 4–3 aggregate victory against FC Midtjylland.

=== Return to Slovakia ===
On 12 May 2026, Weiss was re-appointed as head coach of the Slovakia national team. The Slovak Football Association appointed him as Francesco Calzona's replacement after Slovakia failed to qualify for the 2026 FIFA World Cup.

== Personal life ==
Weiss is married to Marta Weiss and have a son named Vladimír, who plays for numerous football clubs, including Slovan Bratislava. His father, also named Vladimír Weiss, was a footballer who represented Czechoslovakia and won a silver medal at the 1964 Summer Olympics.

== Managerial statistics ==
As of 16 November 2026

Managerial record by team and tenure
Team	Nat.	From	To	Record								Ref
Team	Nat.	From	To	G	W	D	L	GF	GA	GD	Win %	Ref
Kairat	(Kazakhstan)	26 November 2012	30 November 2015	122	66	30	26	206	106	+100	54.10	
Georgia	(Georgia (country))	14 March 2016	16 November 2020	47	16	15	16	61	53	+8	34.04	
Slovan Bratislava	(Slovakia)	11 May 2021	12 May 2026	269	161	52	56	551	311	+240	59.85	
Slovakia	(Slovakia)	12 May 2026	present	8	4	4	0	17	9	+8	50.00	
Career total				446	247	101	98	835	479	+356	55.38	—

== Honours and awards ==
Artmedia

- Slovak First Football League (2): 2004–05, 2007–08
- Slovak Cup (1): 2008

Slovan

- Slovak First Football League (6): 2020–21, 2021–22, 2022–23, 2023–24, 2024–25, 2025–26
- Slovak Cup (1): 2021

Kairat

- Kazakhstan Cup (2): 2014, 2015

Individual

- Crystal Wing Awards, Sport category: 2009
- Slovak Footballer of the Year Awards, Jozef Vengloš Award (6): 2009, 2010, 2020, 2021, 2022, 2023.
