= Kazeem Bolaji =

Nigerian footballer (born 2002)

Personal information
- Full name: Kazeem Bolaji Soliu
- Date of birth: 13 December 2002 (age 23)
- Place of birth: Oko Ode, Nigeria
- Height: 1.73 m (5 ft 8 in)
- Positions: Left-back; winger

Team information
- Current team: Dukla Banská Bystrica
- Number: 77

Youth career
- Team 360 FC

Senior career*
Years	Team	Apps	(Gls)
- Team 360 FC
2021	Tulevik	26	(0)
2022–2025	Spartak Trnava	24	(0)
2025–	Dukla Banská Bystrica	21	(1)
- * Club domestic league appearances and goals as of 21 September 2026

Kazeem Bolaji Soliu (born 13 December 2002) is a Nigerian professional footballer who plays as a left-back for Slovak club FK Dukla Banská Bystrica.

== Club career ==
=== FC Spartak Trnava ===
Bolaji became FC Spartak Trnava player in February 2022, signing a three-and-a-half-year contract.

Bolaji made his professional Fortuna Liga debut for Spartak Trnava against MFK Ružomberok on 20 March 2022, playing entire match. After frequent injuries, it was confirmed that Bolaji would be leaving Spartak Trnava on a free transfer.

=== Dukla Banská Bystrica ===
On 13 June 2025, it was announced that Bolaji had joined 2 tier Slovak side FK Dukla Banská Bystrica.

== Honours ==
Spartak Trnava

- Slovak Cup: 2021–22, 2022–23, 2024–25
