= ŠK Slovan Bratislava =

Association football club in Slovakia

Slovan Bratislava
- Full name: Športový klub Slovan Bratislava futbal, a.s.
- Nicknames: Belasí (Sky Blues); Bieli jastrabi z Tehelného poľa (White Hawks from Tehelné pole)
- Founded: 3 May 1919; 107 years ago (as I. ČSŠK Bratislava)
- Ground: Tehelné pole
- Capacity: 22,500
- Owner: Ivan Kmotrík
- President: Ivan Kmotrík
- Head coach: Yaya Touré
- League: Slovak First Football League
- 2025–26: Slovak First Football League, 1st of 12 (champions)
- Website: www.skslovan.com
Home colours	Away colours	Third colours

ŠK Slovan Bratislava (Slovak pronunciation: [ˈslɔʋam ˈbracislaʋa], "Bratislava Slavs") is a professional football club based in Bratislava, Slovakia, that competes in the Slovak First Football League. Founded as I. ČSŠK Bratislava in 1919, the club adopted its current name in 1953. Slovan is the most successful football club in Slovakia, having won the most league and cup titles in the country.

Slovan Bratislava became the first, and so far only, club from Slovakia and the former Czechoslovakia to win a European club competition, winning the European Cup Winners' Cup by defeating Barcelona in the final in Basel in 1969. The club also supplied seven players to the Czechoslovakia national team that won UEFA Euro 1976.

== History ==
=== Historical names ===
- I. ČSŠK Bratislava (1919–1939)
- ŠK Bratislava (1939–1948)
- ZSJ Sokol NV Bratislava (1948–1952)
- DŠO Slovan ÚNV Bratislava (1953–1956)
- TJ Slovan ÚNV Bratislava (1957–1961)
- TJ Slovan Bratislava Dimitrov (1961)
- TJ Slovan CHZJD Bratislava (1961–1990)
- ŠK Slovan Bratislava (1990–present)

=== 1919–1944: early years ===
Slovan was officially founded on 3 May 1919 as I. ČSŠK Bratislava (the First CzechoSlovak Sports Club Bratislava). The first president was Police Captain Richard Brunner, who arranged the club's first temporary training ground at Kuchajda (Pasienky). The club soon moved to Petržalka.

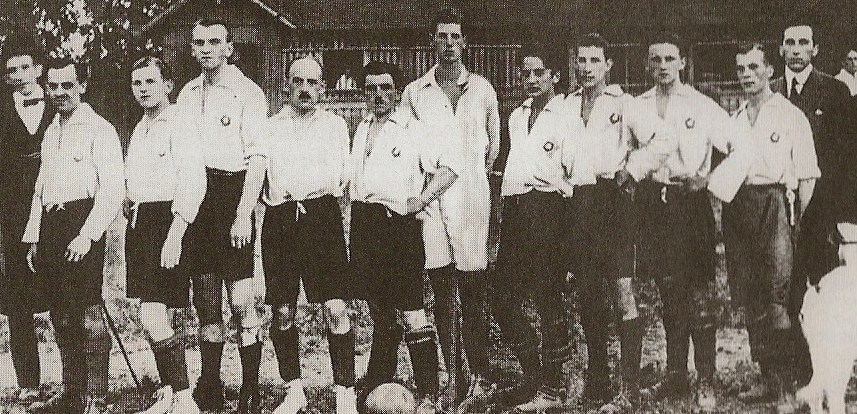
Slovan squad from 1919 season

I. ČsŠK became the champions of Slovakia in 1922. Notable players from the early era were Pavol Šoral, Štefan Čambal and Štefan Priboj. In the spring of 1938 anti-Jewish sentiments penetrated into the club, and the victim was coach József Braun, who was one of the many Bratislava inhabitants who had to involuntarily leave the city. Under the terms of the 1938 Munich Agreement, Czechoslovakia was dissolved, leading to the emergence of the Slovak Republic. At this point, the club's name was changed to ŠK Bratislava. On 26 September 1940 ŠK Bratislava played its first game at the new stadium, Tehelné pole.

The first international meeting at the new venue was on 27 October 1940, when ŠK Bratislava and Hertha Berlin played out a 2–2 draw. In the separate Slovak league, ŠK Bratislava won the title four times between 1939 and 1945. Slovan was the first Czechoslovak team to use the WM formation. The team's first foreign opponent after World War II was Ferencváros. ŠK Bratislava lost 1–0, but won the Central European Cup 2–1 over Hungary in front of 20,000 spectators at Tehelné pole. In this period, former players of I. ČSŠK Bratislava Ferdinand Daučík and Leopold "Jim" Šťastný served as coaches for ŠK Bratislava.

=== 1945–1993: Czechoslovak League ===
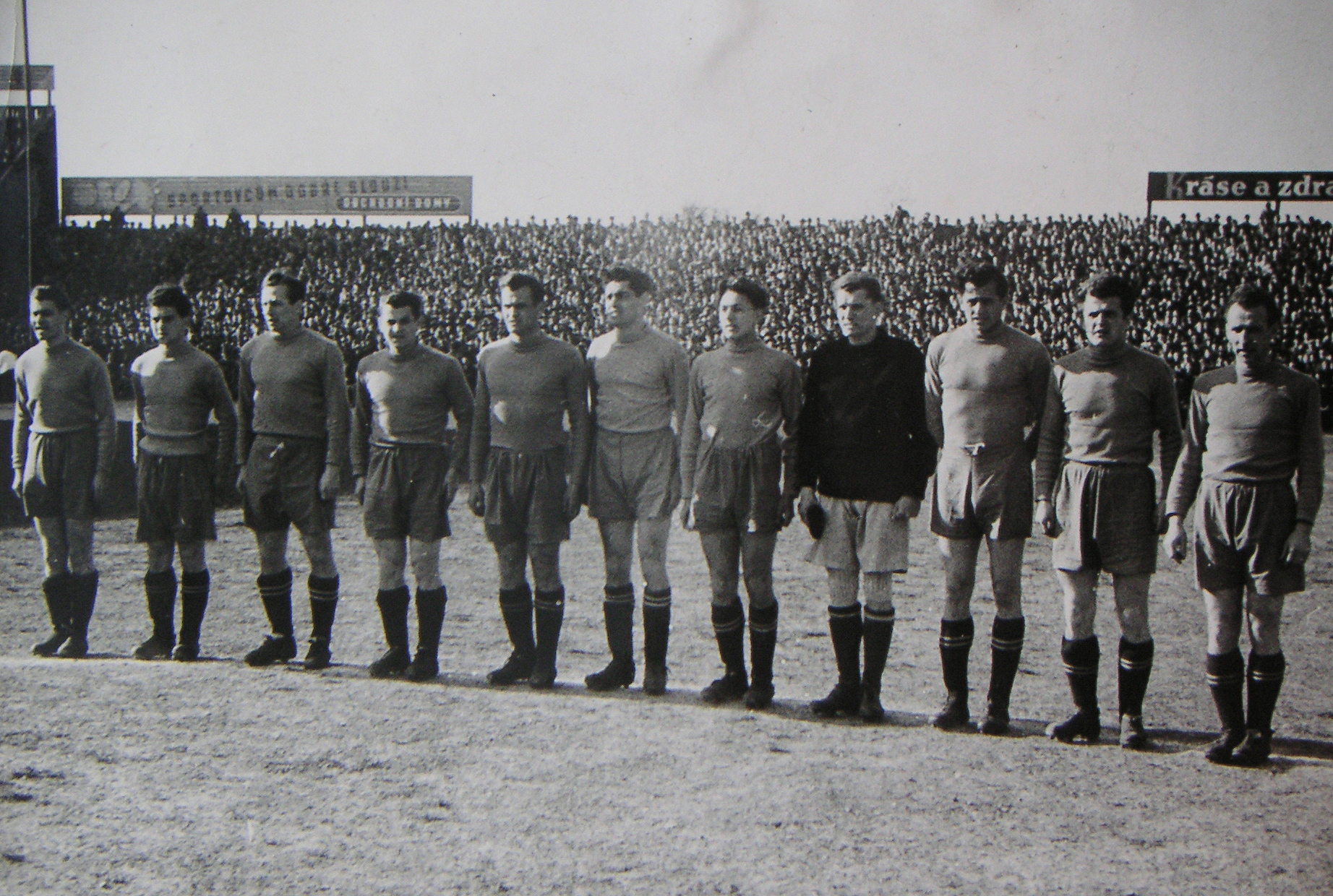
Champion of Czechoslovakia squad from 1951.

The team's name changed again in 1948, to Sokol NV Bratislava. The team met with success in 1949, when they became the first champions of the re-formed Czechoslovakia. Outstanding players from this era included Emil Pažický, Gejza Šimanský, Bozhin Laskov, Viktor Tegelhoff, and Teodor Reimann.

Anton Bulla, the coach in 1953, added eight new players to the team. In 1961–62, the team defeated Red Star Bratislava in the national league for the title. Under the influence of political and economic pressures and interests, TJ ÚNV Slovan and TJ Dimitrov merged to create CHZJD Slovan Bratislava on 5 August 1961 (CHZJD stood for the Juraj Dimitrov Chemical Plant).

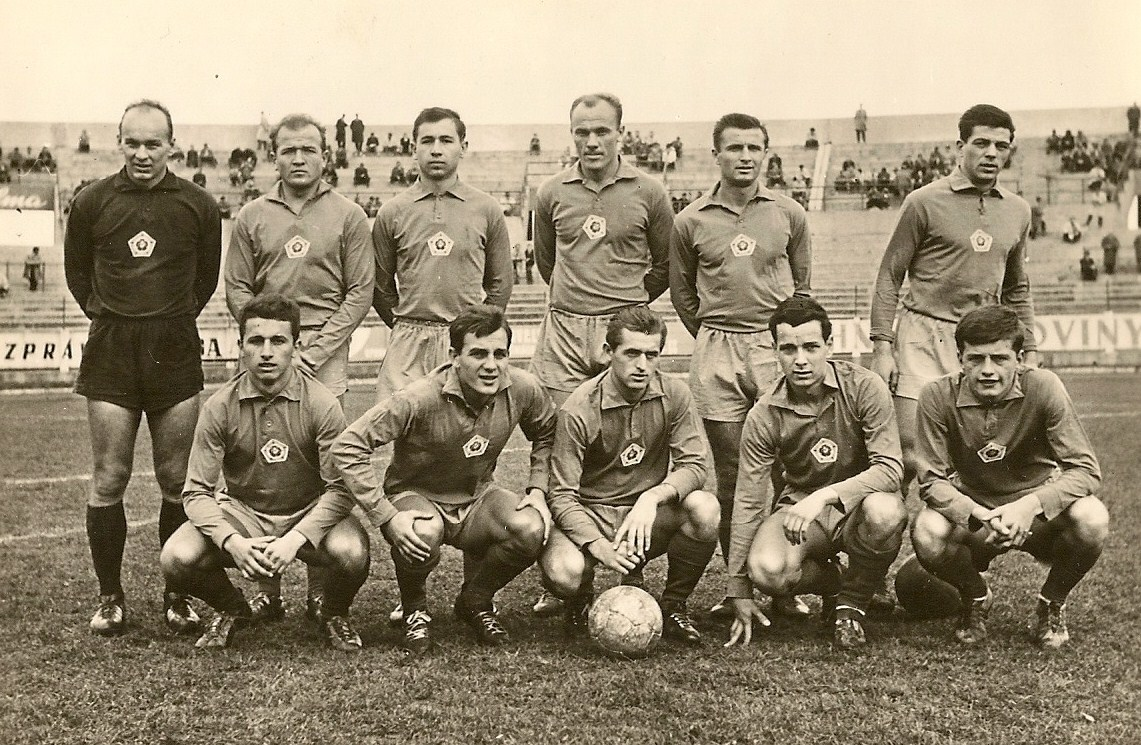
Slovan squad from 1963 to 1964, with national team players like Schrojf, Popluhár, Jokl and Cvetler.

1962 was a successful year, as the Czechoslovakia national team were defeated 3–1 in the 1962 FIFA World Cup Final in Chile, obtaining the silver, and repeating the success of the 1934 FIFA World Cup Final in Rome. Slovan players included goalkeeper Viliam Schrojf and defender Ján Popluhár.

1969 European Cup Winners' Cup Final starting lineup.

Slovan ended the 1967–68 season second in the league, won the cup in Czechoslovakia, and participated in the UEFA Cup Winners' Cup. The team was managed by former Slovan player Michal Vičan, who focused on fast and simple games. Vičan took the team on a winter tour of Argentina in 1969.

In 1970, the Czechoslovak squad sent to the FIFA World Cup in Mexico included seven players from Slovan: Alexander Vencel, Ján Zlocha, Ivan Hrdlička, Karol Jokl, Ján Čapkovič, Vladimír Hrivnák, and Alexander Horváth. Jozef Vengloš was the coach of the Slovan Bratislava team for part of this era, as well as performing duties coaching at the international level.

In 1976, a Czechoslovak team including six Slovan players won the European title in the European Championships held in Belgrade. Gold medals were given to coach Vengloš, Alexander Vencel, Jozef Čapkovič, Koloman Gogh, Marián Masný, Anton Ondruš, Ján Pivarník, and Ján Švehlík. From the 1977–78, season Slovan were declining. In the 1984–85 season Slovan, led by coaches Ján Hucko and Jozef Obert, left the highest level of competition and were relegated to the Slovak National League.

After three seasons spent in the Slovak National League, Slovan Bratislava were able to return to national competition. In season 1987–88, the team returned to the top leagues under the leadership of coaches Ján Zachar and Jozef Jankech, who later coached the Slovak national team. Dušan Galis was the coach from 1977 to 1981. In 1991–92, Slovan Bratislava won the Czechoslovak title for the last time. Among the stars on the team were Peter Dubovský, Dušan Tittel, Ladislav Pecko, Vladimir Kinder, Miloš Glonek, Tomáš Stúpala, and Alexander Vencel Jr.

=== 1969: Cup Winners' Cup champions ===
On 21 May 1969, the team defeated Barcelona in the 1969 European Cup Winners' Cup Final by a score of 3–2, which is the biggest success in the club's history so far. During the match, well-known commentator Gabo Zelenay delivered the slogan "Bieli jastrabi z Tehelného poľa bratislavského" (White Hawks from Tehelné pole Bratislava), referring to the Slovan players who had achieved success in the final. The phrase later became one of the nicknames for the club.

21 May 1969
20:00

Slovan Bratislava (Czechoslovakia)	3–2	(Spain) Barcelona
Cvetler 2'; Hrivnák 30'; Čapkovič 42'	Report Report 2	Zaldúa 16'; Rexach 52'

St. Jakob Stadium, Basel
Attendance: 19,000
Referee: Laurens van Ravens (Netherlands)

=== 1993–present: Slovak League ===
Slovan won titles in the Slovak league in the 1993–94, 1994–95 and 1995–96 seasons. For the next two years, MFK Košice won the title. Slovan returned to the Slovak throne in the 1998–99 season. The stars of the team included coach Stanislav Griga and players Róbert Tomaschek, Miroslav König, Stanislav Varga, Tibor Jančula, and Ladislav Pecko. In the next few years, the club's performance was below par and they were in trouble financially. They were forced to sell some of their best players. At the end of the 2003–04 season, the team was relegated to the Slovak Second League, where they spent two seasons. After two years, in the 2010–11 season, Slovan won the double with coach Karel Jarolím.

== Grounds ==
=== 1940–2009: old Tehelné pole ===
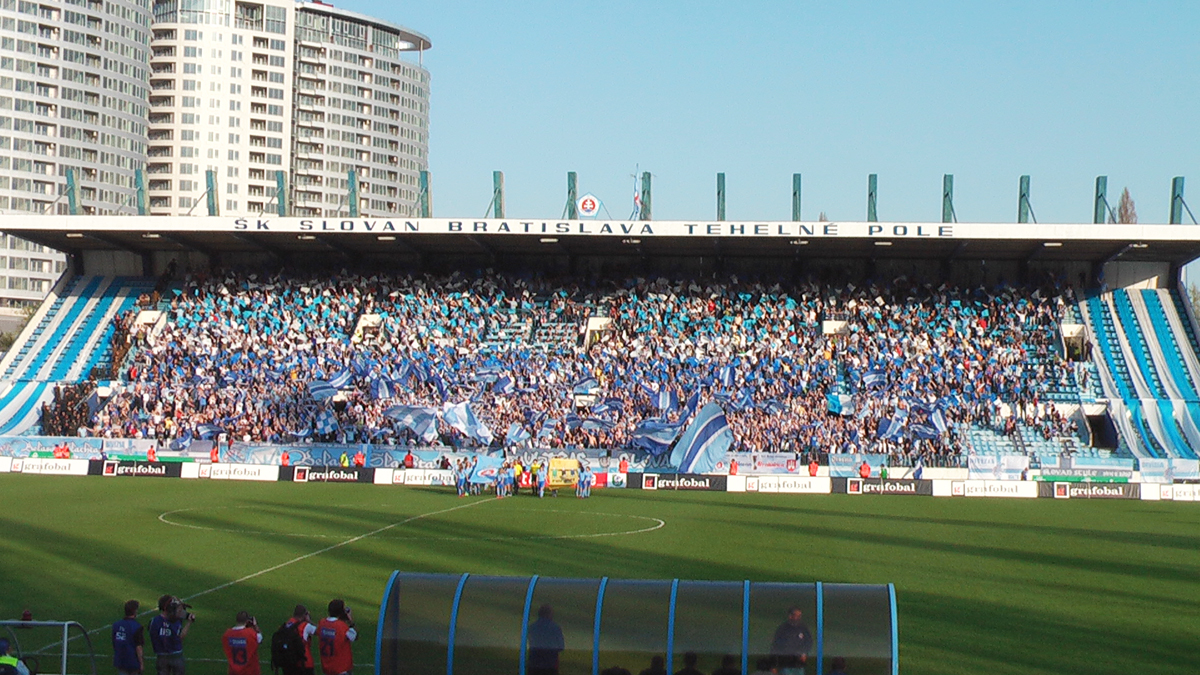
Tehelné pole (old)

Tehelné pole, Slovan's previous stadium, was built during the first Slovak Republic, when Nazi Germany occupied Petržalka in 1938 and Bratislava lost almost all of its sporting facilities. The construction lasted from 1939 to 1944 and the stadium became home ground for Slovan Bratislava. The stadium was officially opened in September 1940 with 25,000 places, and the first international match was played on 27 October 1940, with Slovan Bratislava playing against Hertha Berlin, ending in 2–2 tie. The old stadium underwent reconstruction in 1961, which added second tribune, boosting its capacity to 45,000 and modernising by adding score table, artificial light and revamping the field. However, the stadium could hold up even 50,000 spectators, and just before breakup of Czechoslovakia, it was the largest one in use (Strahov Stadium in Prague had a capacity of 220,000 but was disused in the 1990s) and was the home ground for Czechoslovak national team. The stadium was reconstructed once more in the 1990s to the "all-seater" stadium, reducing the capacity into 30,000. The last match at the old Tehelné pole stadium was played in November 2009.

=== 2009–2018: Pasienky ===
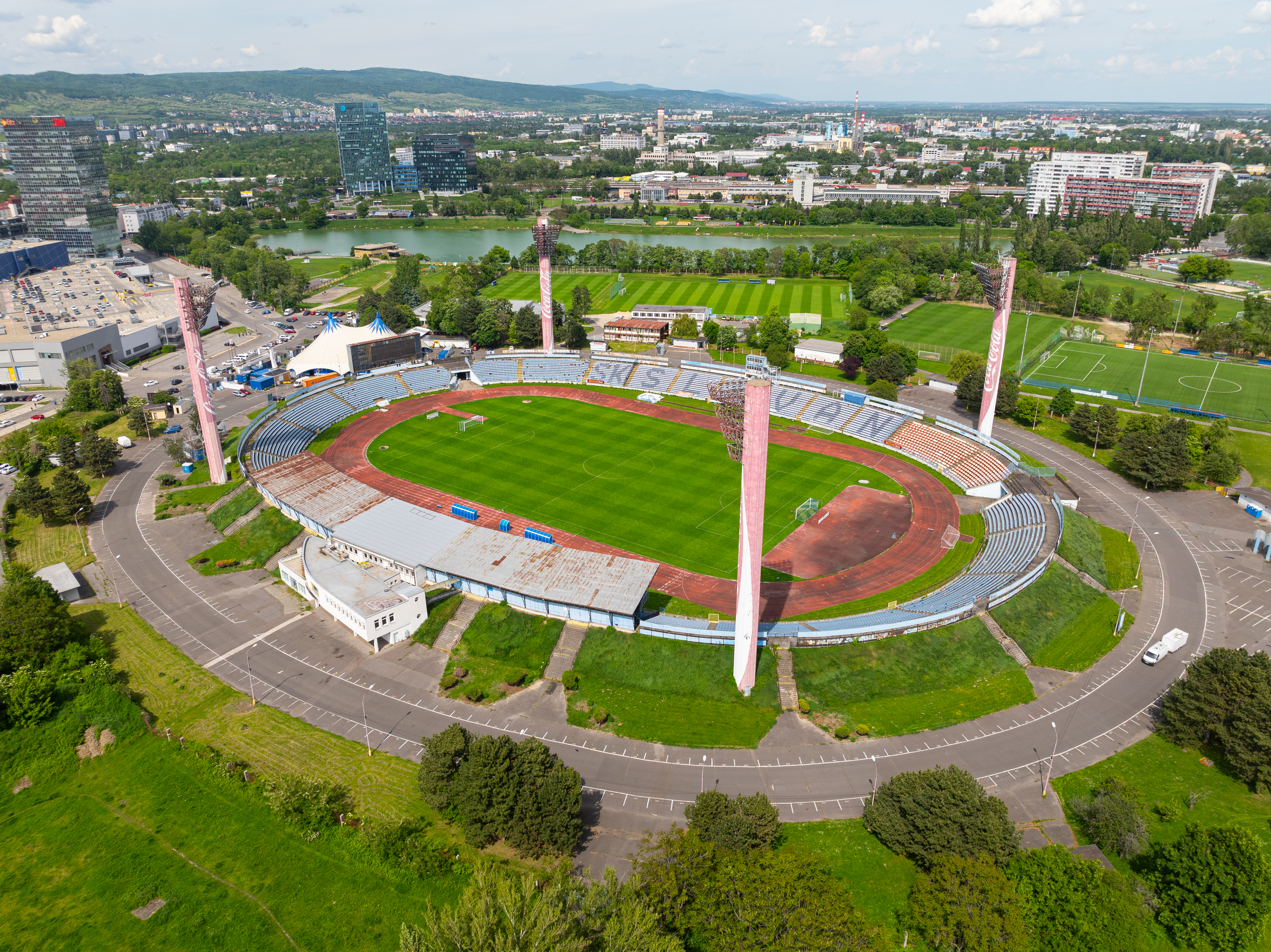
Štadión Pasienky

During the demolition of the old Tehelné pole, the planning of the construction of the new stadium and during the construction itself, the Pasienky Stadium became the temporary home ground for Slovan.

=== 2019–present: new Tehelné pole ===
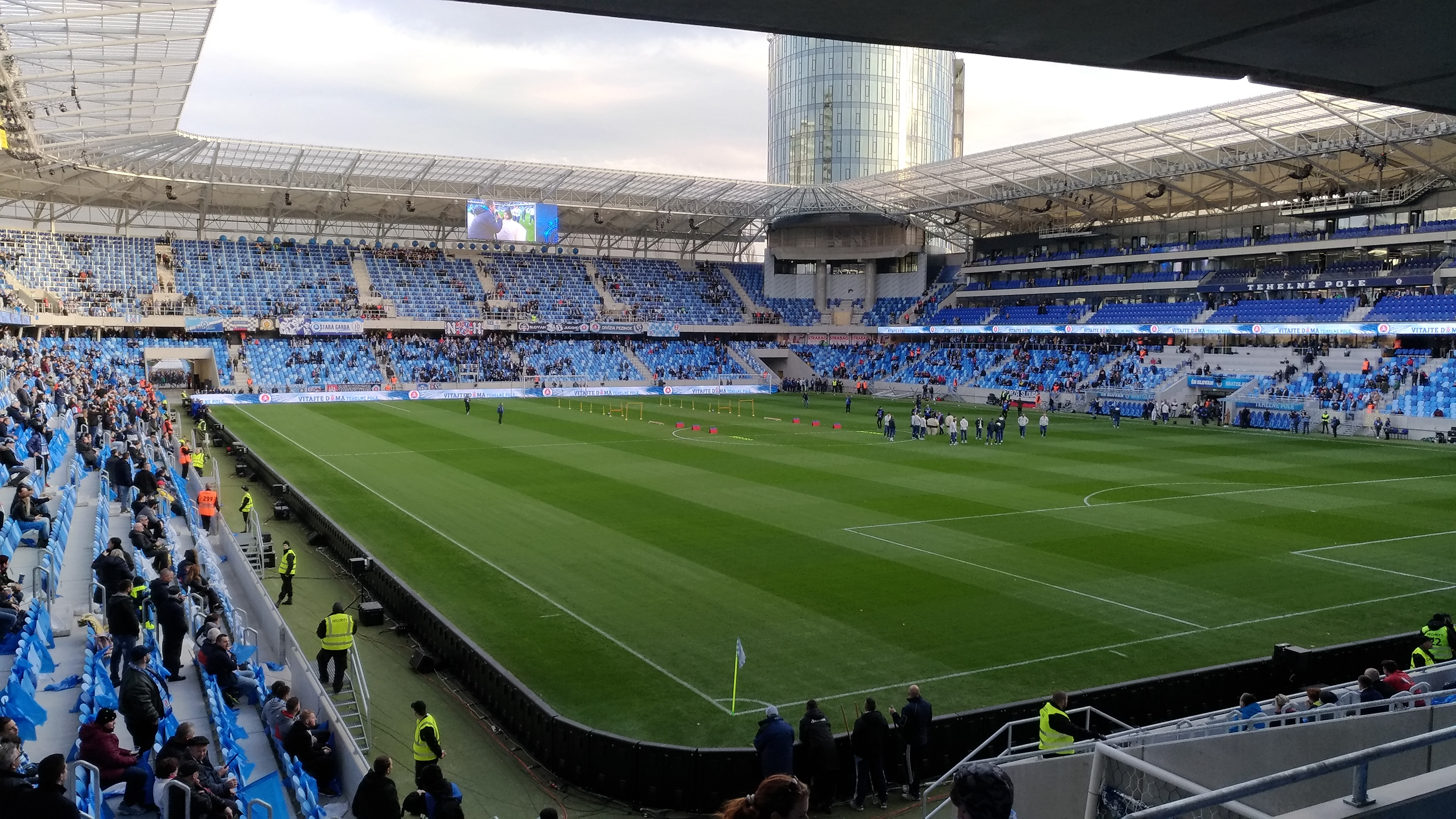
Tehelné Pole

In September 2016, after many years of negotiations and discussions, the building of the new stadium begun. The new stadium was opened on 3 March 2019 with a ceremony before the derby match against Spartak Trnava. The new stadium was built at the same place where Slovan has had its original home. It is a locality, which is typically connected with sports activities in Bratislava. The capacity of the new stadium is 22,500 spectators and fulfils UEFA 4-star category criteria.

== Support ==
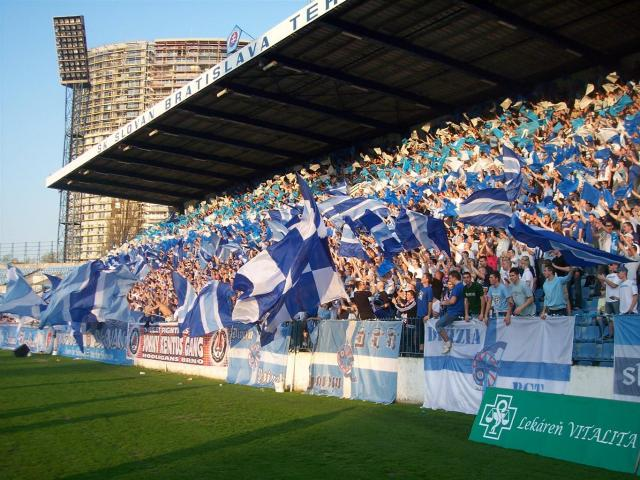
Slovan fans are called Ultras Slovan

The main ultras group is called Ultras Slovan or Sektor C - according to the section in which they are situated during home matches. Previously, the main ultras group was called Belasá šlachta (Sky-blue aristocracy). The major hooligan firm is called Ultras Slovan Pressburg.

Slovan supporters maintain friendly relations with fans Austria Wien and Wisła Kraków.

=== Rivalries ===
Slovan's greatest rival is Spartak Trnava. The derby is the most prestigious match in the Slovak football calendar.

Matches against DAC Dunajská Streda are not considered derbies, but in general they are the second most prestigious fixture in the Slovak league after the traditional derby.

Slovan's major rival teams in Bratislava were Inter Bratislava and Petržalka. The rivalry between Slovan and Inter had a long and rich history as both teams played in the Czechoslovak First League. The rivalry with Petržalka peaked after 2000.

On the international scene, Slovan's rivals are mainly clubs from neighboring countries. Namely, Sparta Prague (Federal Derby), Rapid Wien or Ferencváros.

== Honours ==
=== Domestic ===
Slovakia

- Slovak First Football League (1926–1933; 1939–1944; 1993–present)
  - Winners (24): 1926, 1927, 1930, 1932, 1940, 1941, 1942, 1944, 1993–94, 1994–95, 1995–96, 1998–99, 2008–09, 2010–11, 2012–13, 2013–14, 2018–19, 2019–20, 2020–21, 2021–22, 2022–23, 2023–24, 2024–25, 2025–26
  - Runners-up (7): 1938–39, 1942–43, 2000–01, 2009–10, 2015–16, 2016–17, 2017–18
- Slovak Cup (1969–present)
  - Winners (17): 1969–70, 1971–72, 1973–74, 1975–76, 1981–82, 1982–83, 1988–89, 1993–94, 1996–97, 1998–99, 2009–10, 2010–11, 2012–13, 2016–17, 2017–18, 2019–20, 2020–21
  - Runners-up (7): 1970–71, 1977–78, 2002–03, 2013–14, 2015–16, 2021–22, 2022–23
- Slovak Super Cup (1994–2016)
  - Winners (4): 1993–94, 1995–96, 2008–09, 2013–14
  - Runners-up (3): 1994–95, 1996–97, 2009–10

Czechoslovakia

- Czechoslovak First League (1935–1938; 1945–1993)
  - Winners (8): 1949, 1950, 1951, 1955, 1969–70, 1973–74, 1974–75, 1991–92
  - Runners-up (10): 1952, 1956, 1959–60, 1963–64, 1966–67, 1967–68, 1968–69, 1971–72, 1975–76, 1990–91
- Czechoslovak Cup (1960–1993)
  - Winners (5): 1961–62, 1962–63, 1967–68, 1973–74, 1981–82
  - Runners-up (6): 1964–65, 1969–70, 1971–72, 1975–76, 1982–83, 1988–89
- Slovak National Football League (1969–1993)
  - Winners: 1987–88

=== European ===
- UEFA Cup Winners' Cup
  - Winners: 1968–69
  - Quarter-finals (2): 1962–63, 1963–64
- UEFA Intertoto Cup
  - Winners in group (9): 1968–69, 1969–70, 1971–72, 1972–73, 1973–74, 1976–77, 1989–90, 1991–92, 1993–94
- Mitropa Cup
  - Runners-up: 1963–64
- UEFA Champions League
  - Group stage/league phase (2): 2024–25, 2026–27
- UEFA Europa League
  - Group stage/league phase (3): 2011–12, 2014–15, 2019–20
- UEFA Europa Conference League
  - Round of 16 (1): 2022–23
  - Knockout round playoff (1): 2023–24
  - Group stage/league phase (2): 2021–22, 2025–26

== Results ==
=== Detailed seasons ===
Key to colours and symbols:

1st or W	Winners
2nd or RU	Runners-up
	Current Season
↑	Promoted
↓	Relegated
	Top scorer in division

Key to league record:

- Pld = Matches played
- W = Matches won
- D = Matches drawn
- L = Matches lost
- GF = Goals scored
- GA = Goals against
- Pts = Points
- % = Percentage of points earned out of the total possible number of points
- Pos = Final position

Key to cup record:

- NH = Not held
- QR = Qualifying round
- QR1 = First qualifying round
- QR2 = Second qualifying round, etc.
- PO = Play-off round
- GS = Group stage
- LP = League phase
- R1 = First round
- R2 = Second round, etc.
- R16 = Round of 16
- QF = Quarter-finals
- SF = Semi-finals
- RU = Runners-up
- W = Winners

Slovak League era only (1993–present)

Table correct as of 16 May 2026

Season	League										Slovak Cup	Super Cup	UEFA					Top scorer(s) (Note: Domestic league goals only.)	Goals
Season	Tier	Pld	W	D	L	GF	GA	Pts	%	Pos	Slovak Cup	Super Cup	CL	EL	ECL	CWC	IC	Top scorer(s)	Goals
1993–94	1	32	20	10	2	63	28	50	78.1	1st	W	W		R1	NH (Note: The competition was first contested in the 2021–22 season.)		NH (Note: The competition was founded in 1961, but was only taken over by UEFA in 1995. It was abolished after the 2008 tournament.)	Nigro	12
1994–95	1	32	21	9	2	63	25	72	75.0	1st	QF	W		R2	NH		NH	Maixner / Faktor	9
1995–96	1	32	22	9	1	79	20	75	78.1	1st	R2	RU		R1	NH			Németh	12
1996–97	1	30	15	5	10	49	33	50	55.6	3rd	W	W		QR	NH			Németh	13
1997–98	1	30	12	9	9	41	36	45	50.0	5th	R1	RU			NH	R1		Medveď	8
1998–99	1	30	21	7	2	56	11	70	77.8	1st	W				NH			Jančula / Hrnčár / Majoroš	9
1999–2000	1	30	16	9	5	52	18	57	63.3	3rd	R1	NH	QR2		NH	NH (Note: The competition was abolished after the 1998–99 season and merged into the UEFA Cup (now the UEFA Europa League).)		Varga	9
2000–01	1	36	21	8	7	84	49	71	65.7	2nd	R2	NH		R1	NH	NH		Meszároš	18
2001–02	1	36	14	9	13	42	39	51	47.2	6th	R2	NH		R1	NH	NH		Vittek	14
2002–03	1	36	19	6	11	60	42	63	58.3	3rd	RU				NH	NH		Vittek	19
2003–04	1 ↓	36	6	11	19	37	58	29	26.9	10th	R1				NH	NH		Onofrej	9
2004–05	2	30	14	8	8	37	24	50	55.6	3rd	QF				NH	NH		Sloboda	5
2005–06	2 ↑	30	19	6	5	47	25	63	70.0	2nd	R1				NH	NH		Masaryk	11
2006–07	1	28	11	8	9	35	33	41	48.8	3rd	R2	NH			NH	NH		Masaryk	14
2007–08	1	33	15	6	12	46	37	51	51.5	5th	QF				NH	NH	R2	Masaryk / Slovák / Meszároš / Sylvestr	6
2008–09	1	33	21	7	5	69	25	70	70.7	1st	SF	NH			NH	NH		Masaryk	15
2009–10	1	33	21	7	5	54	24	70	70.7	2nd	W	W	QR3	PO	NH	NH	NH	Halenár	11
2010–11	1	33	20	8	5	63	22	68	68.7	1st	W	RU		PO	NH	NH	NH	Šebo	22
2011–12	1	33	16	11	6	48	35	59	59.6	3rd	QF	NH	QR3	GS	NH	NH	NH	Halenár	15
2012–13	1	33	16	11	6	56	33	59	59.6	1st	W	NH		QR2	NH	NH	NH	Peltier	10
2013–14	1	33	24	3	6	63	32	75	75.8	1st	RU	NH	QR2		NH	NH	NH	Fořt / Vittek	12
2014–15	1	33	18	3	12	49	42	57	57.6	3rd	QF	W	PO	GS	NH	NH	NH	Soumah / Milinković	8
2015–16	1	33	20	9	4	50	25	69	69.7	2nd	RU	NH		QR3	NH	NH	NH	Priskin	12
2016–17	1	30	18	3	9	54	34	57	63.3	2nd	W	NH		QR2	NH	NH	NH	Soumah (Note: Joint top scorer with Filip Hlohovský of Žilina.)	20
2017–18	1	32	17	8	7	58	37	59	61.5	2nd	W	NH		QR2	NH	NH	NH	Mareš / Čavrić	12
2018–19	1	32	25	5	2	84	33	80	83.3	1st	R2	NH		QR3	NH	NH	NH	Šporar	29
2019–20	1	27	21	5	1	57	14	68	84.0	1st	W	NH	QR1	GS	NH	NH	NH	Šporar	12
2020–21	1	32	22	5	5	78	28	71	74.0	1st	W	NH	QR1	QR2	NH	NH	NH	Ratão	14
2021–22	1	32	22	8	2	71	25	74	77.1	1st	RU	NH	QR2	PO	GS	NH	NH	Henty	9
2022–23	1	32	21	6	5	65	32	69	71.9	1st	RU	NH	QR2	QR3	R16	NH	NH	Čavrić	15
2023–24	1	32	23	4	5	76	31	73	76.0	1st	QF	NH	QR3	PO	R32	NH	NH	Barseghyan	15
2024–25	1	32	22	6	4	74	39	72	75.0	1st	SF	NH	LP			NH	NH	Barseghyan / Strelec	20
2025–26	1	32	21	5	6	62	37	68	70.8	1st	R16	NH	QR3	PO	LP	NH	NH	Šporar	12
Season	Tier	Pld	W	D	L	GF	GA	Pts	%	Pos	Slovak Cup	Super Cup	CL	EL	ECL	CWC	IC	Top scorer(s)	Goals
Season	League										Slovak Cup	Super Cup	UEFA					Top scorer(s)	Goals

=== European record ===
==== UEFA ranking ====
UEFA coefficient ranking as of 7 June 2026:

Rank	Team	Coefficient
63	(Spain) Athletic Bilbao	38.750
64	(Czech Republic) Sparta Prague	38.250
65	(Slovakia) Slovan Bratislava	36.000
66	(France) Rennes	35.000
67	(Switzerland) Basel	34.500

- Full list

== Players ==
=== Current squad ===
As of 16 September 2026

Note: Flags indicate national team as defined under FIFA eligibility rules; some limited exceptions apply. Players may hold more than one non-FIFA nationality.

No.	Pos.	Nation	Player
1	GK	SRB	Aleksandar Popović
2	DF	SVK	Samuel Kozlovský
3	MF	SVK	Peter Pokorný
5	MF	GHA	Rahim Ibrahim
6	DF	AUT	Kevin Wimmer
7	MF	SVK	Leo Hofstädter
8	MF	SVK	Artur Gajdoš
9	FW	UKR	Mykola Kukharevych
10	FW	SVK	Nino Marcelli
11	MF	ARM	Tigran Barseghyan
12	DF	SLO	Kenan Bajrić
13	FW	SVK	Roman Čerepkai
14	FW	GAM	Alasana Yirajang
15	DF	SRB	Svetozar Marković
17	DF	CZE	Jurij Medveděv

No.	Pos.	Nation	Player
19	FW	ENG	Manasse Kianga
20	MF	BIH	Alen Mustafić
21	FW	GAM	Suleiman Camara
24	FW	SVK	Matúš Tomáško
28	DF	PAN	César Blackman
29	FW	SVK	Alexej Maroš
30	FW	SVK	Adam Griger (on loan from (Czech Republic) Hradec Králové)
44	GK	SVK	Matúš Macík
49	DF	GUI	Sahmkou Camara (on loan from (Czech Republic) Slavia Prague)
57	DF	ANG	Sandro Cruz
70	MF	PAN	Cristian Martínez
71	GK	SVK	Dominik Takáč
77	MF	UKR	Danylo Ihnatenko
88	MF	JPN	Daiki Matsuoka (on loan from (Japan) Avispa Fukuoka)
99	FW	SLO	Andraž Šporar (captain)

For recent transfers, see List of Slovak football transfers summer 2026

=== Out on loan ===
Note: Flags indicate national team as defined under FIFA eligibility rules; some limited exceptions apply. Players may hold more than one non-FIFA nationality.

No. / Pos. / Nation / Player	No. / Pos. / Nation / Player

== Personnel ==
=== Coaching staff ===
Position	Name
Head coach	(Ivory Coast) Yaya Touré
Assistant head coach	(France) Serge Costa (Republic of Ireland) Darren O'Dea (Slovakia) Timotej Vajdík
Goalkeeping coaches	(Slovakia) Martin Krnáč (Slovakia) Ján Mucha
Fitness coach	(Slovakia) Matej Balun
Team manager	(Slovakia) Peter Mriglot
First team director	(Slovakia) Ján Švehlík

=== Management ===
Position	Name
President	(Slovakia) Ivan Kmotrík
Sporting director	(Slovakia) Róbert Vittek

== Kit suppliers and shirt sponsors ==
Period	Kit manufacturer	Shirt sponsor
?–1992	Puma	Incheba
1993–1998	Adidas	VÚB
1998–1999	Adidas	SPP
2000–2003	Adidas	none
2003–2004	Adidas	SPP
2004–2005	Adidas	none
2005–2008	Nike	Doprastav
2008–2009	Nike	none
2009–2010	Nike	Grafobal
2010–2011	Nike	Grafobal
2011–2017	Nike	Nike
2017–2018	Nike	none
2019–2020	Nike	Grafobal
2020–	Nike	Niké

== Player records ==
=== Most goals (only domestic league goals) ===
#	Nat.	Name	Goals
1	(Slovakia)	Ján Arpáš	144
2	(Czechoslovakia)	Jozef Luknár	115
3	(Czechoslovakia)	Ján Čapkovič	100
4	(Czechoslovakia)	Marián Masný	97
5	(Czechoslovakia)	Viktor Tegelhoff	88
6	(Czechoslovakia)	Emil Pažický	80
7	(Czechoslovakia)	Ján Švehlík	78
8	(Czechoslovakia)	Anton Moravčík	71
8	(Slovakia)	Róbert Vittek	71
10	(Czechoslovakia)	Karol Jokl	69

Players whose name is listed in bold are still active.

=== Czechoslovak and Slovak top goalscorer ===
The Czechoslovak League top scorer from 1944 to 1945 until 1992–93. Since the 1993–94 Slovak League top scorer.

Year	Winner	G
1954–55	(Czechoslovakia) Emil Pažický	19^{1}
1971–72	(Czechoslovakia) Ján Čapkovič	19
1980–81	(Czechoslovakia) Marián Masný	16
1991–92	(Slovakia) Peter Dubovský	27
1992–93	(Slovakia) Peter Dubovský	24
2008–09	(Slovakia) Pavol Masaryk	15
2010–11	(Slovakia) Filip Šebo	22
2016–17	(Guinea) Seydouba Soumah	20^{2}
2018–19	(Slovenia) Andraž Šporar	29
2019–20	(Slovenia) Andraž Šporar	12
2023–24	(Armenia) Tigran Barseghyan	13^{3}
2024–25	(Armenia) Tigran Barseghyan (Slovakia) David Strelec	20

^{1}11 goals for Slovan and 8 for Žilina.
^{2}Joint top scorer with Filip Hlohovský of Žilina.
^{3}Joint top scorer with Róbert Polievka of B.Bystrica.

== Transfers ==
Slovan have produced numerous players who have gone on to represent the Slovak national football team. Over the last period, there has been a steady increase of young players leaving Slovan after a few years of first team football and moving on to play football in leagues of a higher standard, with the German Bundesliga (best scorer Róbert Vittek to 1. FC Nürnberg in 2003), English Premier League (Vladimír Kinder to Middlesbrough in 1997, Stanislav Varga to Sunderland in 2000, Igor Bališ to West Bromwich Albion in 2000), Turkish Süper Lig (Marko Milinković to Gençlerbirliği in 2016, Ľubomír Meszároš to Elazığspor in 2002, Marián Zeman to İstanbulspor in 1995), Italy (Marek Hamšík to Brescia in 2004), Spanish La Liga (Samuel Slovák to Tenerife in 1997 and Peter Dubovský to Real Madrid for 110 million SKK (€4.3million) in 1993). Other interesting transfers were Dušan Tittel to Nîmes in 1992, Igor Demo to PSV Eindhoven in 1997, Róbert Tomaschek to Hearts in 2000, Kornel Saláta to Rostov in 2011 and Branislav Niňaj to Lokeren in 2015. The second highest transfer fee was agreed in 2020 when 25 year old striker and previous season top scorer Andraž Šporar joined Portuguese team Sporting CP for a fee of more than €7 million. The most expensive transfer was agreed in 2025 when top scorer David Strelec joined Middlesbrough for a fee of €10 million, which was the highest ever paid to a Slovak club.

=== Record departures ===
Rank	Player	To	Fee	Year	Ref.
1	(Slovakia) David Strelec	(England) Middlesbrough	€10 million	2025	
2	(Slovenia) Andraž Šporar	(Portugal) Sporting CP	€6 million (Note: Fee may have eventually risen up to €7 million with achievable bonuses.)	2020	
3	(Slovakia) Peter Dubovský	(Spain) Real Madrid	€3.4 million (Note: For comparison, the world record transfer fee at the time was €16.5 million.)	1993	
4	(Slovakia) Dominik Greif	(Spain) Mallorca	€2.5 million	2021	
4	(Slovakia) David Strelec	(Italy) Spezia	€2.5 million	2021	
6	(Slovakia) Vladimír Kinder	(England) Middlesbrough	€2.1 million	1997	
7	(Guinea) Seydouba Soumah	(Serbia) Partizan	€1.65 million	2017	
8	(Slovakia) Róbert Vittek	(Germany) 1. FC Nürnberg	€1.3 million	2004	
9	(Slovakia) Stanislav Varga	(England) Sunderland	€1.25 million	2000	
10	(Brazil) Rafael Ratão	(France) Toulouse	€1.2 million	2021	
10	(Slovakia) Miloš Glonek	(Italy) Ancona	€1.2 million	1992	

=== Record arrivals ===
Rank	Player	From	Fee	Year	Ref.
1	(Nigeria) Ibrahim Rabiu	(Belgium) Gent	€1.0 million	2017	
1	(Croatia) Marko Tolić	(Croatia) Dinamo Zagreb	€1.0 million	2024	
1	(The Gambia) Suleiman Camara	(Spain) Racing Santander	€1.0 million	2026	
3	(The Gambia) Alasana Yirajang	(Slovakia) Podbrezová	€900,000	2025	
4	(Serbia) Svetozar Marković	(Czech Republic) Viktoria Plzeň	€800,000	2026	
4	(Ukraine) Mykola Kukharevych	(England) Swansea City	€800,000	2025	
6	(Trinidad and Tobago) Lester Peltier	(Slovakia) Trenčín	€700,000	2012	
6	(Hungary) Dávid Holman	(Hungary) Debrecen	€700,000	2017	
6	(Slovakia) David Strelec	(Italy) Spezia	€700,000	2024	
6	(Panama) Cristian Martínez	(Israel) Kiryat Shmona	€700,000	2026	
9	(Slovakia) Samuel Štefánik	(Netherlands) NEC	€600,000	2014	
9	(Slovenia) Kenan Bajrić	(Slovenia) Olimpija Ljubljana	€600,000	2018	
9	(Slovenia) Andraž Šporar	(Switzerland) Basel	€600,000	2018	
9	(Ukraine) Artem Sukhotskyi	(Ukraine) Zorya Luhansk	€600,000	2018	

== Club records ==
=== Slovak First Football League records ===
- Best position: 1st (multiple seasons; see Honours)
- Worst position: 10th (relegated) (2003–04)
- Biggest home win: 6–0 vs: Zlaté Moravce (2008/09), DAC Dunajská Streda (2008/09), Žilina (2017/18), Zemplín Michalovce (2018/19), Komárno (2024/25)
- Biggest away win: 6–0 vs: Železiarne Podbrezová (2023/24)
- Biggest home defeat: 0–5 vs: Žilina (2024–25)
- Biggest away defeat: 0–4 vs: Trenčín (2014/15 & 2022/23), Spartak Trnava (2014/15); 1–5 vs: Ružomberok (2008/09)

== See also ==
- List of ŠK Slovan Bratislava seasons
- List of ŠK Slovan Bratislava managers
- List of ŠK Slovan Bratislava players
- ŠK Slovan Bratislava in European football
