= Pavol Masaryk =

Slovak football striker (born 1980)

Personal information
- Full name: Pavol Masaryk
- Date of birth: 11 February 1980 (age 46)
- Place of birth: Radimov, Czechoslovakia
- Height: 1.84 m (6 ft 0 in)
- Position: Forward

Youth career
- TJ Radimov
- TJ Holíč

Senior career*
Years	Team	Apps	(Gls)
- TJ Holíč
2001–2003	MFK Myjava–Turá Lúka	48	(32)
2003–2005	Spartak Trnava	60	(10)
2005–2010	Slovan Bratislava	149	(56)
2010	AEL Limassol	9	(1)
2011	Cracovia	6	(0)
2011–2012	Ružomberok	32	(18)
2012–2013	Senica	8	(2)
2015	Ružomberok	28	(10)
2016	Skalica	14	(2)
2016–2017	Hodonín		
Total		354	(131)
- * Club domestic league appearances and goals

Pavol Masaryk (born 11 February 1980) is a Slovak former professional footballer who plays as a striker.

== Career ==
=== Club ===
He has previously played for TJ Holíč, MFK Myjava and FC Spartak Trnava. In the 2006–07 season, he was the third top-scorer of the Super Liga.

In February 2011, he joined Polish club Cracovia and signed a half-year contract. He was released from the club on 16 June 2011. In July 2011, he joined Slovak club MFK Ružomberok. On 27 January 2016, he signed a contract with Skalica.

== Honours ==
Slovan Bratislava

- Slovak First Football League: 2008–09
- Slovak Cup: 2009–10
- Slovak Super Cup: 2009

Individual

- Slovak First Football League top scorer: 2008–09, 2011–12
