= Ľubomír Meszároš =

Slovak footballer (born 1979)

Personal information
- Full name: Ľubomír Meszároš
- Date of birth: 23 March 1979 (age 47)
- Place of birth: Bratislava, Czechoslovakia
- Height: 1.85 m (6 ft 1 in)
- Position: Striker

Team information
- Current team: SV Gols
- Number: 11

Senior career*
Years	Team	Apps	(Gls)
1997–2002	Slovan Bratislava	122	(39)
2002–2003	Elazigspor	33	(9)
2003–2004	Adanaspor	22	(2)
2004–2005	Panionios	17	(2)
2005–2009	Slovan Bratislava	63	(12)
2009–2010	Dynamo České Budějovice	27	(3)
2010–2011	1. FC Tatran Prešov	21	(4)
2011–2012	SC Ritzing	14	(2)
2012–	SV Gols	36	(25)

International career
2000–2002	Slovakia	8	(1)
- * Club domestic league appearances and goals as of 19 October 2013

Ľubomír Meszároš (born 23 March 1979 in Bratislava) is a Slovak professional footballer who currently plays for SV Gols in the Austrian 1. Klasse Nord.

== Club career ==
Meszároš spent two seasons in the Turkish Super Lig, with Elazığspor and Adanaspor, and one season in the Super League Greece with Panionios.

== International career ==
Meszároš has made eight appearances for the full Slovakia national football team.

== Career statistics ==
=== International goals ===
#	Date	Venue	Opponent	Score	Result	Competition
1.	28 March 2001	Štadión Antona Malatinského, Trnava, Slovakia	Azerbaijan	3-1	Win	2002 FIFA World Cup qualification
Correct as of 4 November 2012

== Honours ==
- Slovak Superliga (2):
  - 1999, 2009
- Slovenský Pohár (1):
  - 1999
