= Pavol Šoral =

Slovak footballer

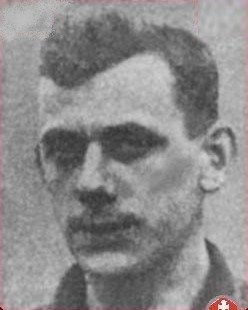

Personal information
- Full name: Pavol Šoral
- Date of birth: 18 January 1903
- Date of death: 29 August 1977 (aged 74)

International career
Years	Team	Apps	(Gls)
1929–1931	Czechoslovakia	2	(0)

Pavol Šoral (18 January 1903 – 29 August 1977) was a former Slovak footballer who played for club side ŠK Slovan Bratislava.

He was the first Slovak player to represent the Czechoslovakia national football team. He played club football for Slovan and his career ended following a leg injury in 1934.
