= Ľubomír Faktor =

Slovak footballer

Personal information
- Date of birth: 18 March 1967 (age 59)
- Position: Midfielder

Senior career*
Years	Team	Apps	(Gls)
1984–1987	TJ ZVL Žilina		
1987–1989	VTJ Tábor		
1989–1991	SK Slavia Praha		
1991–1993	FK Dukla Banská Bystrica		
1994–1996	ŠK Slovan Bratislava		
1997–1998	1. FC Košice		
1998–2000	FK Dukla Banská Bystrica		
2000–2001	Ozeta Dukla Trencin		
2001–2002	FK NCHZ Nováky		

International career
1994–1995	Slovakia	5	(1)
- * Club domestic league appearances and goals

Ľubomír Faktor (born 18 March 1967) is a retired Slovak football midfielder.
