= Doprastav =

- Trade name: Doprastav, a.s.
- Formerly: Národný podnik Doprastav
- Company type: Public company
- Industry: Construction of infrastructure
- Founded: 1953; 72 years ago
- Founder: Czechoslovak Socialist Republic
- Headquarters: Bratislava, Slovakia
- Area served: Europe, Asia
- Key people: Dušan Mráz (President), Roman Guniš (CEO)
- Website: www.doprastav.sk/en/

Doprastav a.s. is a Slovak construction company, which was established in 1953. The company focuses mainly on transportation construction, such as roads, bridges and railways.

An example of their construction is the Apollo Bridge in Bratislava. The construction won an award from the European Association of Steel Construction.

In 2006, Doprastav posted a profit of 461.74 million Slovak korunas (€13.55 million) after taxation and employed 3,500 people in average.
