= Jozef Obert =

Slovak footballer and coach (1938–2020)

Personal information
- Date of birth: 4 January 1938
- Place of birth: Veľké Bielice, Czechoslovakia
- Date of death: 18 October 2020 (aged 82)
- Place of death: Bratislava, Slovakia
- Position: Forward

Senior career*
Years	Team	Apps	(Gls)
1956-1959	Slovan Bratislava	45	(15)
1959-1960	Rudá Hvězda Brno	29	(9)
1960	ČH Bratislava	14	(4)
1960-1964	Slovan Bratislava	79	(35)
1964-1966	1. FC Tatran Prešov	38	(15)
1965-1968	Slovan Bratislava	57	(11)
1968-1972	Wacker Innsbruck	87	(15)
Total		349	(104)

International career
1958	Czechoslovakia	4	(0)

Managerial career
- 1978-1981: Slovan Bratislava (Assistant)
- 1981–1984: Casino Salzburg
- 1985: Slovan Bratislava
- 1994: 1. FC Košice
- * Club domestic league appearances and goals

Jozef Obert (4 January 1938 – 18 October 2020), nicknamed Joschi during his career in Austria, was a Slovak football forward and later coach. He played for Slovan Bratislava, Rudá Hvězda Brno, Tatran Prešov and Wacker Innsbruck. He scored 92 goals at the Czechoslovak First League. He died 18 October 2020 in Bratislava.

Obert earned four caps for the Czechoslovakia national team and debuted against Soviet Union in friendly match on 30 August 1958.

His grandson Adam Obert is a defender playing for Cagliari Calcio.
