= Fabio Nigro =

Argentine footballer

Personal information
- Full name: Fabio Héctor Nigro
- Date of birth: 29 December 1965 (age 60)
- Place of birth: Junín, Argentina
- Position: Striker

Senior career*
Years	Team	Apps	(Gls)
1983–1985	River Plate	7	(0)
1985–1986	Vigor Lamezia	22	(1)
1986–1987	Viterbese	23	(9)
1987–1988	Lazio	5	(0)
1988–1990	Viterbese	23	(5)
1990–1992	Frosinone	39	(10)
1992–1993	Baník Prievidza		
1993–1994	Slovan Liberec		
1994–1996	Slovan Bratislava	?	(20)
1996–1997	Estudiantes	12	(1)
1998	Douglas Haig		
1998–2002	Sarmiento		
Total		338	(46)
- * Club domestic league appearances and goals

Fabio Héctor Nigro (born 29 December 1965) is an Argentine former professional footballer who played for River Plate, Estudiantes, Douglas Haig and Sarmiento, in Italy for Vigor Lamezia, Viterbese, Lazio and Frosinone, in Slovakia Baník Prievidza and Slovan Bratislava, in the Czech Republic for Slovan Liberec.

== Career ==
Nigro started his career with River Plate, making his debut on July 13, 1983, against Platense.
