= Emil Pažický =

Slovak footballer

Personal information
- Date of birth: 14 October 1927
- Place of birth: Považský Chlmec, Czechoslovakia
- Date of death: 21 November 2003 (aged 76)
- Place of death: Bratislava, Slovakia
- Position: Striker

Senior career*
Years	Team	Apps	(Gls)
1945–1948	ŠK Žilina		
1948–1950	Slovan Bratislava		
1950–1952	ATK Praha		
1952–1955	Slovan Bratislava		
1955–1956	Žilina		
1956–1960	Slovan Bratislava		
1960–1961	Jednota Trenčín		

International career
1949–1955	Czechoslovakia	18	(7)
- * Club domestic league appearances and goals

Emil Pažický (14 October 1927 in Považský Chlmec – 21 November 2003 in Bratislava) was a Slovak football player, who played for Czechoslovakia, for whom he obtained 18 caps (seven goals). He was a participant at the 1954 FIFA World Cup, and played mostly for ŠK Žilina and Slovan Bratislava.

In 1955 he became the top goalscorer of the Czechoslovak First League, and he scored a total of 123 goals in the league.
