= Viktor Tegelhoff =

Slovak footballer

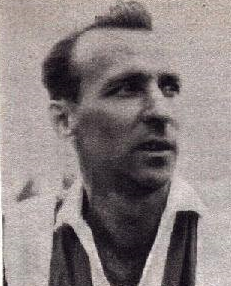

Personal information
- Full name: Viktor Tegelhoff
- Date of birth: 22 December 1918
- Place of birth: Ružomberok, Czechoslovakia
- Date of death: 11 September 1991 (aged 72)
- Place of death: Bratislava, Czechoslovakia
- Position: Forward

Senior career*
Years	Team	Apps	(Gls)
1942–1956	Slovan Bratislava		

International career
1943–1944	Slovakia	3	(0)
1946–1953	Czechoslovakia	10	(0)
- * Club domestic league appearances and goals

Viktor Tegelhoff (22 December 1918 – 11 September 1991) was a Slovak football player. He played for club ŠK Slovan Bratislava. Tegelhoff was posthumously inducted into the Slovak Football Hall of Fame in 2025.
