= Ivan Hrdlička =

Slovak footballer

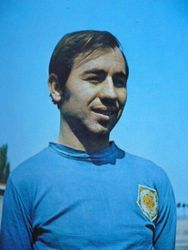
- Hrdlička with Slovan ChZJD Bratislava

Personal information
- Date of birth: 20 November 1943 (age 82)
- Place of birth: Bratislava, Czechoslovakia
- Position: Midfielder

Senior career*
Years	Team	Apps	(Gls)
1962–1972	Slovan ChZJD Bratislava		
1972–1975	Zbrojovka Brno	88	(5)

International career
1964–1971	Czechoslovakia	17	(2)

Managerial career
- 1978: Slovan ChZJD Bratislava
- 1985–1986: Zbrojovka Brno
- –: ŠKP Dúbravka
- * Club domestic league appearances and goals

Ivan Hrdlička (born 20 November 1943) is a Slovak former footballer who played as a midfielder. He played for Czechoslovakia, playing 17 matches and scoring two goals. He was a participant at the 1970 FIFA World Cup.

He played mostly for Slovan Bratislava and also for Zbrojovka Brno. He coached ŠKP Dúbravka, Slovan Bratislava and 1. FC Brno.
