= Ľudovít Cvetler =

Slovak footballer (born 1938)

Personal information
- Date of birth: 17 September 1938 (age 88)
- Place of birth: Bernolákovo, Czechoslovakia
- Position: Striker

Senior career*
| Years | Team | Apps | (Gls) |
| 1959–1969 | ŠK Slovan Bratislava | 232 | (54) |
| 1969–1972 | Standard de Liège | 86 | (22) |
| 1972–1974 | FC Zbrojovka Brno | 25 | (5) |
| Total | | 343 | (81) |

International career
| 1964 | Czechoslovakia | 2 | (0) |
| 1960–1966 | Czechoslovakia B | 6 | (0) |
| 1963–1964 | Czechoslovakia Olympic | 7 | (2) |
Medal record
Men's football
Representing Czechoslovakia
Olympic Games
| Silver medal – second place | 1964 Tokyo | Team competition |
- * Club domestic league appearances and goals

Ľudovít Cvetler (born 17 September 1938 in Bernolákovo) is a former Slovak football player. He played for Czechoslovakia, for whom he made two appearances. He played for ŠK Slovan Bratislava for ten seasons. He helped them to the 1969 European Cup Winners' Cup final where he scored the opening goal as they beat Barcelona 3–2. Cvetler subsequently moved to Belgium before playing two more seasons in the Czechoslovak First League for Brno.
