= Ibrahim Rabiu =

Nigerian footballer (born 1991)

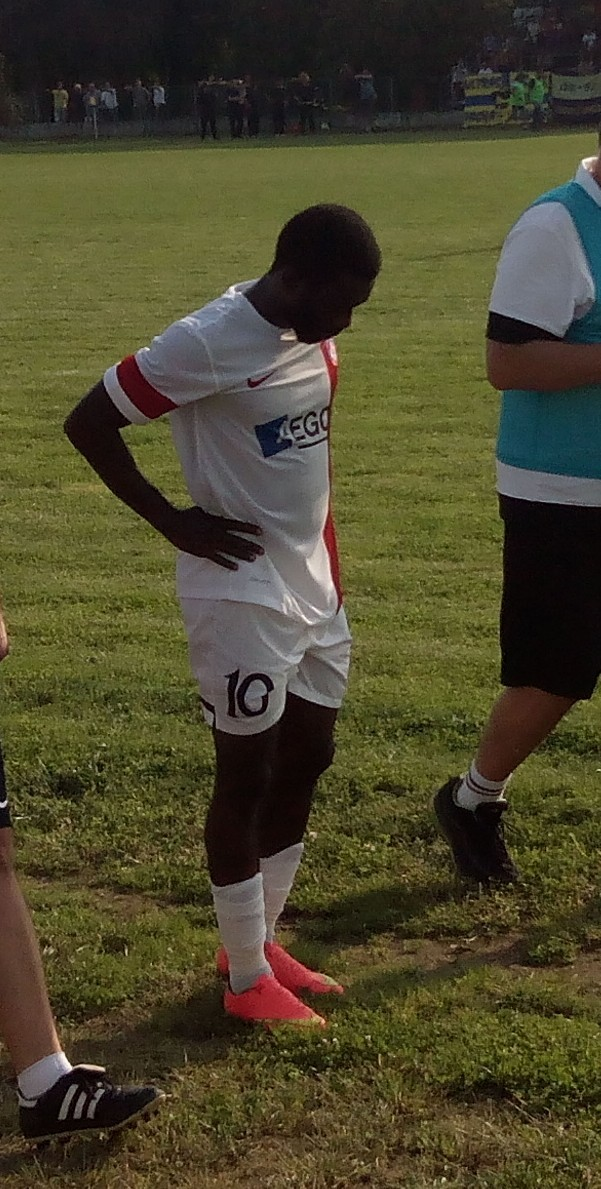
- Rabiu in 2014

Personal information
- Full name: Ibrahim Danda Rabiu
- Date of birth: 15 March 1991 (age 35)
- Place of birth: Kano, Nigeria
- Height: 1.67 m (5 ft 6 in)
- Position: Attacking midfielder

Youth career
- 2004–2007: Gateway
- 2007–2009: Sporting CP

Senior career*
Years	Team	Apps	(Gls)
2009–2010	Sporting CP	0	(0)
2009–2010	→ Real Massamá (loan)	1	(0)
2011	PSV	2	(0)
2012–2013	Celtic	1	(0)
2013–2014	Kilmarnock	16	(0)
2014–2016	Trenčín	46	(10)
2016–2017	Gent	4	(0)
2017–2022	Slovan Bratislava	98	(8)

International career
2007	Nigeria U17	7	(3)
2009	Nigeria U20	6	(3)
2011	Nigeria U23	2	(0)
2015	Nigeria	5	(0)
- * Club domestic league appearances and goals as of 20:29, 1 November 2022 (UTC)

Ibrahim Danda Rabiu (born 15 March 1991) is a Nigerian professional footballer who plays as an attacking midfielder.

== Club career ==
=== Sporting CP ===
Rabiu was born in Kano. In summer 2007, he signed for Sporting CP for €450,000, in a joint ownership agreement with his previous club Gateway FC. Shortly afterwards, it was reported that Premier League sides Chelsea, Liverpool, Manchester United, and Arsenal were interested in signing him, but nothing came of it.

In late 2007, Rabiu was included by World Soccer in its 50 Most Exciting Teen Footballers list and, in March of the following year, he was featured by InsideFutbol.com in an article on young African footballers including Emmanuel Adebayor, Mario Balotelli and Mikel John Obi. In January 2009, he appeared in Goal.com's list of 10 African Players to Watch, and The Times' Football's Top 50 Rising Stars.

Rabiu participated in the 2008 Bellinzona Under-19 International Tournament with Sporting, with the Portuguese eventually winning the trophy. In the competition, in which he was eventually voted as the best player, he was deployed as a classic number 10 in a 4–2–3–1 system; one year later, he again led the Lisbon team to the final stage of the same tournament.

In October 2009, Rabiu twice rejected an offer of a professional contract, and was at that time sent on loan to Real S.C. in the third division. In January 2010 he drew interest from Scottish Premier League's Celtic, but the deal never materialised due to undisclosed reasons believed to involve work permit issues.

In 2010, Rabiu left Sporting as a free agent. Subsequently, Dutch side VVV-Venlo tried to sign him in partnership with a United Kingdom-based consortium, but the negotiations broke down due to financial issues. In December, shortly after Damien Comolli was appointed director of football at Anfield, the player was again linked to Liverpool.

=== PSV ===
In January 2011, Rabiu went on trial with Eerste Divisie club Telstar through an investment group. After performing well in a friendly against PSV Eindhoven and later being described as one of the best players in the match by the team's coach, he was quickly offered a contract, pending a valid work permit from the Royal Dutch Football Association.

However, Telstar could not afford to sign Rabiu even with the help of private investors. Subsequently, he went on trial with PSV, scoring twice in a 2–0 win against their reserves in a practice match – the first team's coach, Fred Rutten, said: "Ibrahim is fast, technically skilled, physically strong and has a good sense of field position, there is something in that boy"; on 11 March 2011, he agreed to a deal at the Eredivisie side.

In December 2011, Rabiu's agent reached a mutual agreement with PSV to terminate the player's contract, because of limited first-team action.

=== Celtic ===
On 18 January 2012, Celtic announced that, after a successful trial period, they had agreed terms to sign Rabiu on a three-and-a-half-year deal, pending a work permit application which was granted five days later. He revealed that he turned down a move to clubs in England and Germany to join the Glasgow team, believing it could help him restore his reputation.

Rabiu made his debut on 3 May 2012, coming on as a 74th-minute substitute in a 1–0 home victory over St Johnstone: his cross gave Gary Hooper the chance to score, but he was offside.

=== Kilmarnock ===
On 2 January 2013, Kilmarnock manager Kenny Shiels confirmed that Rabiu had signed a two-year contract with the club on a free transfer. The 21-year-old decided to move to Rugby Park in search of regular first-team football; he also stated that his choice was due to his new team having a similar style to that of FC Barcelona, whilst Shiels said that the move was good for the player's career and that he would attempt to 'get inside his head' to help him find his form.

Rabiu made his debut for the East Ayrshire team two weeks after signing, coming on as a substitute for Paul Heffernan in a goalless draw against Dundee United. He finished his first season with only six appearances.

On 19 October 2013, Rabiu collapsed in the first half of a league fixture against Ross County and was taken to the nearby University Hospital Crosshouse. The following January, both he and his compatriot Reuben Gabriel were released.

== International career ==
Rabiu was a member of the Nigerian under-17 team in the 2007 FIFA World Cup in South Korea, scoring in the first match against France as the nation went on to win the competition. Before the tournament, he had been dubbed "the new Jay-Jay Okocha", and helped the side win that year's Africa U-17 Cup of Nations held in Togo, scoring twice against Eritrea in the group stage (8–0).

Aged 16, Rabiu was included in the senior squad by German coach Berti Vogts for the 2008 Africa Cup of Nations, with his under-17 teammate Haruna Lukman. However, a groin injury prevented him from participating in the tournament.

In 2009, Rabiu helped Nigeria to win bronze in the African Youth Championship in Rwanda, netting against Ivory Coast and South Africa, with the national team securing a place in that year's FIFA U-20 World Cup where he appeared in three matches, scoring against Germany in the 2–3 round-of-16 loss; in addition to his six goals in the youth levels, he also provided many assists.

In the following years, Rabiu continued to be closely watched by the Nigerian senior coaches, with Samson Siasia claiming in the media in April 2010 that he was one of only two players who could solve the country's attacking midfield problems. Siasia was appointed in November 2010 and the player was called up to his first camp ahead of the 2013 Africa Cup of Nations, but the manager in charge was now Stephen Keshi.

Rabiu earned his first full cap on 13 June 2015, playing for 32 minutes in a 2–0 home win over Chad in Kaduna for the 2017 Africa Cup of Nations qualifiers.

== Personal life ==
Rabiu is a practising Muslim.

== Career statistics ==
As of 15 October 2017

Club	Season	League			Cup			League Cup			Europe			Total		
Club	Season	App	Goals	Assists	App	Goals	Assists	App	Goals	Assists	App	Goals	Assists	App	Goals	Assists
PSV	2011–12	2	0	0	2	1	1	–			–			4	1	1
PSV	Total	2	0	0	2	1	1	–			–			4	1	1
Celtic	2011–12	1	0	0	0	0	0	0	0	0	–			1	0	0
Celtic	2012–13	0	0	0	1	0	0	0	0	0	–			1	0	0
Celtic	Total	1	0	0	1	0	0	0	0	0	–			2	0	0
Kilmarnock	2012–13	6	0	1	0	0	0	0	0	0	–			6	0	1
Kilmarnock	2013–14	10	0	1	0	0	0	1	0	0	–			11	0	1
Kilmarnock	Total	16	0	2	0	0	0	1	0	0	–			17	0	2
Trenčín	2014–15	17	4	1	4	1	0	–			–			21	5	1
Trenčín	2015–16	26	5	7	5	1	0	–			2	0	0	33	6	7
Trenčín	2016–17	3	1	0	0	0	0	–			4	0	0	7	1	0
Trenčín	Total	46	10	8	9	2	0	–			6	0	0	61	12	8
Gent	2016–17	4	0	0	1	0	0	–			3	0	0	8	0	0
Gent	Total	4	0	0	1	0	0	–			3	0	0	8	0	0
Slovan Bratislava	2017–18	8	0	0	0	0	0	–			0	0	0	8	0	0
Slovan Bratislava	Total	8	0	0	0	0	0	–			0	0	0	8	0	0
Career Total		75	10	10	13	3	1	1	0	0	9	0	0	109	13	11

== Honours ==
PSV

- KNVB Cup: 2011–12

Celtic

- Scottish Cup: 2012–13

Trenčín

- Slovak Super Liga: 2014–15, 2015–16
- Slovak Cup: 2014–15, 2015–16

Slovan Bratislava

- Slovak Super Liga: 2018–19, 2019–20, 2020–21, 2021–22
- Slovak Cup: 2019–20, 2020–21

Nigeria

- FIFA U-17 World Cup: 2007
- African U-17 Championship: 2007
- African Youth Championship bronze medal: 2009

Individual

- Slovak Super Liga Team of the Season: 2021–22
