= 2021 Slovak Cup final =

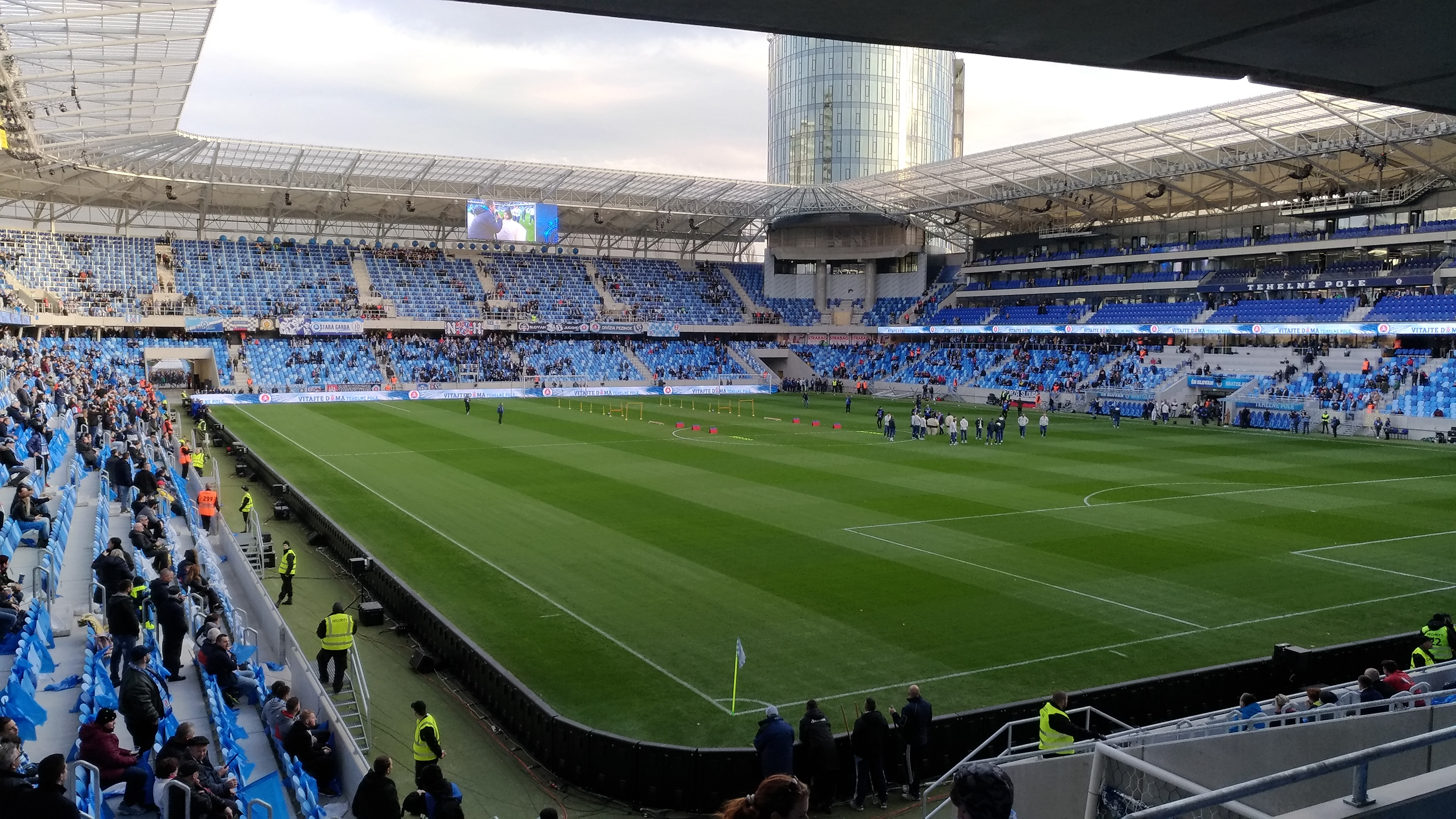
- Tehelné pole in Bratislava held the final
- Event: 2020–21 Slovak Cup
Žilina	Slovan Bratislava
1	2
- After extra time
- Date: 19 May 2021
- Venue: Tehelné pole, Bratislava
- Referee: Peter Kráľovič
- Attendance: 0 (Note: The final was played behind closed doors due to the COVID-19 pandemic in Slovakia.)

The 2021 Slovak Cup final (known as the Slovnaft Cup for sponsorship reasons) was the final match of the 2020–21 Slovak Cup, the 52nd season of the top cup competition in Slovak football. The match was played at the Tehelné pole in Bratislava, on 19 May 2021, contested by MŠK Žilina and ŠK Slovan Bratislava.

== Teams ==
In the following table, finals until 1993 were in the Czechoslovak era, since 1994 were in the Slovak era.

Team	Previous final appearances (bold indicates winners)
Žilina	9 (**1961**, 1977, 1980, 1986, 1990, 2011, **2012**, 2013, 2019)
Slovan Bratislava	21 (**1970**, 1971, **1972**, **1974**, **1976**, 1978, **1982**, **1983**, **1989**, **1994**, **1997**, **1999**, 2003, **2010**, **2011**, **2013**, 2014, 2016, **2017**, **2018**, **2020**)

== Road to the final ==
Note: In all results below, the score of the finalist is given first (H: home; A: away; N: neutral venue).

Žilina (1)		Round	Slovan Bratislava (1)
Opponent	Result	2020–21 Slovak Cup	Opponent	Result
Námestovo (3)	7–0 (A)	Second Round	Beluša (3)	2–0 (A)
Tatran Oravské Veselé (3)	1–1 (4–3 p) (A)	Third Round	Spartak Kvašov (4)	6–0 (A)
Belá (5)	w/o	Fourth Round	Príbelce (4)	w/o
Železiarne Podbrezová (2)	1–1 (6–5 p) (N)	Round of 16	Tatran Liptovský Mikuláš (2)	1–0 (N)
Zlaté Moravce (1)	2–0 (A)	Quarter-finals	Petržalka (2)	5–1 (H)
Košice (2)	4–2 (A), 4–1 (H) (8–3 agg.)	Semi-finals	Dukla Banská Bystrica (2)	3–0 (H), 3–1 (A) (6–1 agg.)

== Match ==
=== Details ===
Although the match was played at the home stadium of Slovan Bratislava, "home" team (for administrative purposes) had been determined by an additional draw held after the semi-finals.

19 May 2021
18:00 (UTC+2)

Žilina	1–2 (a.e.t.)	Slovan Bratislava
Kiwior 30'	Report	Henty 61'; Weiss 105+4' (pen.)

Tehelné pole, Bratislava
Attendance: 0
Referee: Peter Kráľovič

**Žilina**	**Slovan Bratislava**

GK	30	(Slovakia) Ľubomír Belko
RB	28	(Ghana) Benson Anang
CB	23	(Slovakia) Ján Minárik	(red card) 26'
CB	14	(Poland) Jakub Piotr Kiwior
LB	2	(Slovakia) Dominik Javorček	(yellow card) 90+2'	(substituted off) 105'
CM	21	(Slovakia) Ján Bernát	(yellow card) 120'	(substituted off) 42'
CM	18	(North Macedonia) Enis Fazlagikj	(yellow card) 90'
CM	9	(Slovakia) Miroslav Gono		(substituted off) 105'
RW	29	(Slovakia) Dávid Ďuriš	(yellow card) 75'	(substituted off) 61'
CF	17	(Slovakia) Jakub Paur (c)		(substituted off) 64'
LW	66	(Slovakia) Matúš Rusnák	(yellow card) 78'	(substituted off) 78'
Substitutes:
GK	22	(Slovakia) Samuel Petráš
DF	5	(Slovakia) Adam Kopas		(substituted on) 40'
DF	27	(Slovakia) Branislav Sluka		(substituted on) 105'
MF	7	(Slovakia) Patrik Myslovič		(substituted on) 78'
MF	11	(Armenia) Vahan Bichakhchyan		(substituted on) 105'
FW	6	(Slovakia) Adrián Kaprálik		(substituted on) 78'
FW	90	(Poland) Dawid Kurminowski	(yellow card) 120+4'	(substituted on) 64'
Manager:
(Slovakia) Pavol Staňo

GK	30	(Slovakia) Michal Šulla	(yellow card) 120'
RB	81	(Argentina) Vernon De Marco	(yellow card) 23'	(substituted off) 78'
CB	14	(Netherlands) Myenty Abena	(yellow card) 120+4'
CB	29	(Bulgaria) Vasil Bozhikov (c)		(substituted off) 105'
LB	17	(Czech Republic) Jurij Medveděv
CM	6	(Netherlands) Joeri de Kamps		(substituted off) 71'
CM	10	(Nigeria) Rabiu Ibrahim
AM	21	(Brazil) Rafael Ratão		(substituted off) 46'
AM	8	(Slovakia) David Holman		(substituted off) 46'
AM	55	(Serbia) Aleksandar Čavrić		(substituted off) 78'
CF	9	(Nigeria) Ezekiel Henty
Substitutes:
GK	1	(Slovakia) Dominik Greif
DF	25	(Slovakia) Lukáš Pauschek		(substituted on) 78'
DF	66	(Slovenia) Kenan Bajrić	(yellow card) 120+4'	(substituted on) 105'
MF	23	(Czech Republic) Erik Daniel		(substituted on) 78'
MF	24	(Spain) Nono		(substituted on) 71'
MF	79	(Slovakia) Vladimír Weiss	(yellow card) 98' (yellow-red card) 111'	(substituted on) 46'
MF	15	(Slovakia) David Strelec		(substituted on) 46'
Manager:
(Slovakia) Vladimír Weiss

Assistant referees:
Peter Kováč
Daniel Poláček
Fourth official:
Martin Dohál

**Match rules**

- 90 minutes.
- 30 minutes of extra time if necessary.
- Penalty shoot-out if scores still level.

== See also ==
- 2020–21 Slovak Cup
- 2021–22 UEFA Europa Conference League
