= 1996–97 Slovak Cup =

Tournament details
- Country: Slovakia
- Teams: 32

Final positions
- Champions: Slovan Bratislava
- Runners-up: Tatran Prešov

The 1996–97 Slovak Cup was the 28th season of Slovakia's annual knock-out cup competition and the fourth since the independence of Slovakia. It began on 3 September 1996 with the matches of first round and ended on 1 June 1997 with the final. The winners of the competition earned a place in the qualifying round of the UEFA Cup Winners' Cup. Chemlon Humenné were the defending champions.

== First round ==
The games were played on 3 and 4 September 1996.

Team 1	Score	Team 2
Koba Senec	0–4	Spartak Trnava
FKM Nové Zámky	1–1 (4–2 p)	FC Nitra
SCP Ružomberok	2–1	1. FC Košice
PFK Piešťany	2–3	DAC Dunajská Streda
Kohucsi Gabčíkovo	0–3	Kerametal Dubnica nad Váhom
NCHZ Nováky	3–3 (2–4 p)	BSC JAS Bardejov
ZŤS VTJ Martin	0–1	MŠK Žilina
EX-Hlásnik Vráble	1–3	Artmedia Petržalka
Tatran Devín	1–6	Inter Bratislava
Tesla Stropkov	1–4	Tatran Prešov
Bukocel Vranov nad Topľou	0–2	Lokomotíva Košice
Slovan Levice	2–2 (4–5 p)	Tauris Rimavská Sobota
Slavoj Trebišov	1–1 (2–4 p)	Dukla Banská Bystrica
Matador Púchov	3–1	Chemlon Humenné
Ozeta Dukla Trenčín	1–3	MFK Petrimex Prievidza
ŠKP Bratislava	0–5	Slovan Bratislava

Sources: ,

== Second round ==
The games were played on 1 and 2 October 1996.

Team 1	Score	Team 2
FKM Nové Zámky	2–2 (5–6 p)	DAC Dunajská Streda
MŠK Žilina	2–4	Tatran Prešov
SCP Ružomberok	4–1	Kerametal Dubnica nad Váhom
Matador Púchov	1–3	Artmedia Petržalka
Dukla Banská Bystrica	1–2	Lokomotíva Košice
MFK Petrimex Prievidza	2–2 (5–4 p)	Tauris Rimavská Sobota
Inter Bratislava	5–0	Spartak Trnava
BSC JAS Bardejov	1–2	Slovan Bratislava

Sources: ,

== Quarter-finals ==
The games were played on 20 November 1996.

20 November 1996	SCP Ružomberok	3–0	MFK Petrimex Prievidza	Ružomberok
	Talda 14'; Hýravý 55' (pen.); Lunper 63'	Report		Stadium: Štadión pod Čebraťom; Attendance: 6,000; Referee: Vladimír Hriňák

20 November 1996	Slovan Bratislava	6–1	DAC Dunajská Streda	Bratislava
	Tittel 10'; 18. Gomes 18', 75'; Demo 23', 80'; Tomaschek 37'	Report	Korobka 90'	Stadium: Tehelné pole Attendance: 1,898; Referee: Miroslav Velický

20 November 1996	Tatran Prešov	1–1 (6–5 p)	Artmedia Petržalka	Prešov
	Solotruk 18'	Report	Strelec 79'	Stadium: Štadión Tatranu; Attendance: 3,000; Referee: Jozef Ligocký

20 November 1996	Lokomotíva Košice	0–1	Inter Bratislava	Košice
		Report	Vaďura 1'	Stadium: Štadión Lokomotívy; Attendance: 880; Referee: Karol Ihring

== Semi-finals ==
The first legs were played on 18 March 1997. The second legs were played on 15 April 1997.

=== First legs ===
18 March 1997	Inter Bratislava	2–2	Slovan Bratislava	Bratislava
	Pinte 9'; Solár 12'	Report	Sz. Németh 8'; Karasy 68'	Stadium: Štadión Pasienky; Attendance: 3,000; Referee: Karol Ihring

18 March 1997	Tatran Prešov	3–0	SCP Ružomberok	Prešov
	Reiter 7'; Nemec 15'; Jambor 89'	Report		Stadium: Štadión Tatranu; Attendance: 2,400; Referee: Milan Bezák

=== Second legs ===
15 April 1997	Slovan Bratislava	3–1 (5–3 agg.)	Inter Bratislava	Bratislava
	Sz. Németh 57'; Demo 65'; Slovák 90'	Report	Landerl 7'	Stadium: Tehelné pole Attendance: 6,500; Referee: Vladimír Hriňák

15 April 1997	SCP Ružomberok	0–0 (0–4 agg.)	Tatran Prešov	Ružomberok
		Report		Stadium: Štadión pod Čebraťom; Attendance: 3,000; Referee: Anton Stredák

== Final ==
1 June 1997
17:00 CEST

Slovan Bratislava	1–0 (a.e.t.)	Tatran Prešov
Soboňa 108'	Report

Štadión na Sihoti, Trenčín
Attendance: 11,286
Referee: Ľuboš Micheľ
