= Slovak Cup =

National association football cup

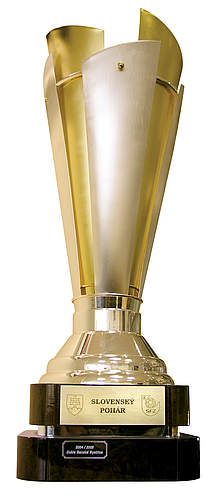
- Trophy used between 2005–2018
- Founded: 1969
- Region: Slovakia
- Teams: Various
- Qualifier for: UEFA Europa League
- Current champions: MŠK Žilina (2nd title)
- Most championships: Slovan Bratislava (17 titles)
- Broadcaster: STVR
- Website: futbalsfz.sk
- 2025–26 Slovak Cup

The Slovak Cup (Slovak: Slovenský pohár), currently named Slovnaft Cup due to sponsorship agreement with Slovnaft, is the only nationwide knockout competition in Slovak football. The winner qualifies for the first round of the UEFA Europa League qualification.

== History ==
The competition was first contested in 1969. Until 1993, the winner of the Slovak Cup would face the winner of the Czech Cup in the Czechoslovak Cup final, the winner of which would be Czechoslovakia's representative in the UEFA Cup Winners' Cup (Slovan Bratislava won the tournament in 1968–69).

The first winner of the cup after the split of Czechoslovakia and the establishment of the independent Slovak Republic was Slovan Bratislava in 1994, when they defeated Tatran Prešov 2–1 in the final match in Brezno.

Second-league teams have won the cup twice, in 2002 VTJ KOBA Senec and in 2007 ViOn Zlaté Moravce. Second-league clubs also qualified for the final, Ličartovce in 2004 and MFK Skalica in 2017.

== Trophy ==
The trophy for the winner of the national cup has taken various forms throughout its history. The first and longest-serving trophy was a traveling crystal cup, which was awarded to the winner of the cup competition between 1970 and 2004. For several years, two cups were awarded to the winners, in addition to the original crystal cup and a cup dedicated to the Slovak Football Association. In 2005, the trophy changed material, the crystal cup was replaced by a new one made of metal and brass, the first winner of the new trophy was Dukla Banská Bystrica.

On the occasion of the 50th anniversary of the Slovak Cup in 2019, a new modern trophy was created. The Academy of Fine Arts in Bratislava became the SFZ's partner in its implementation, and organized a two-round student competition for new trophy designs. The first round received 29 designs, five of which advanced to the final round, and then representatives of the SFZ, the Academy of Fine Arts, and Slovnaft selected the winning trophy.

== Sponsorship ==
Period	Sponsor	Name
1969–1997	No main sponsor	Slovenský pohár
1997–2001	Zlatý Bažant	Slovenský pohár Zlatého Bažanta
2002–2011	No main sponsor	Slovenský pohár
2011–present	Slovnaft	Slovnaft Cup

== Format ==
The Slovak Cup plays as a knockout tournament. All matches that ended in a draw after 90 minutes are decided by penalty shoot-outs. All rounds are played as one-off matches except the semi-finals, which are played over two legs.

== Cup winners (Czechoslovak era 1969–1993) ==
Between 1969 and 1993 the winners contested the Czechoslovak Cup final against the winner of the Czech Cup.

Season	Winner	Score	Runner-up	Venue
1969–70	Slovan Bratislava	2–2, 1–0	Dukla Banská Bystrica	2 matches played
1970–71	Spartak Trnava	2–0, 0–1	Slovan Bratislava	2 matches played
1971–72	Slovan Bratislava	1–2, 4–1 (aet)	Spartak Trnava	2 matches played
1972–73	VSS Košice	3–0, 3–3	Tatran Prešov	2 matches played
1973–74	Slovan Bratislava	0–0, 2–2 (6–5p)	Spartak Trnava	2 matches played
1974–75	Spartak Trnava	2–0, 1–2	Nitra	2 matches played
1975–76	Slovan Bratislava	0–0, 2–1	Inter Bratislava	2 matches played
1976–77	Lokomotíva Košice	0–2, 4–0	Žilina	2 matches played
1977–78	Jednota Trenčín	1–0, 3–1	Slovan Bratislava	2 matches played
1978–79	Lokomotíva Košice	2–2, 3–0	Inter Bratislava	2 matches played
1979–80	ZŤS Košice	2–4, 5–0	Žilina	2 matches played
1980–81	Dukla Banská Bystrica	1–1, 1–0	ZŤS Košice	2 matches played
1981–82	Slovan Bratislava	3–1, 0–0	Petržalka	2 matches played
1982–83	Slovan Bratislava	0–0, 1–1	Nitra	2 matches played
1983–84	Inter Bratislava	2–0, 1–0	Dukla Banská Bystrica	2 matches played
1984–85	Lokomotíva Košice	1–0, 1–1	Tatran Prešov	2 matches played
1985–86	Spartak Trnava	1–0	Žilina	Futbalový štadión Prievidza
1986–87	DAC Dunajská Streda	0–0 (6–5p)	Nitra	Štadión Antona Malatinského
1987–88	Inter Bratislava	1–0	Spartak Trnava	Štadión na Sihoti
1988–89	Slovan Bratislava	2–1	Považská Bystrica	Štadión Hlohovec
1989–90	Inter Bratislava	6–0	Žilina	Mestský štadión Žiar nad Hronom
1990–91	Spartak Trnava	1–0	Nitra	Štadión pod Čebraťom
1991–92	Tatran Prešov	2–0	Lokomotíva Košice	Stadium MUDr. Ivan Chodák
1992–93	1. FC Košice	0–0 (5–4p)	DAC Dunajská Streda	Na Zahradkach Stadium

== Cup winners (Slovak era 1993–present) ==
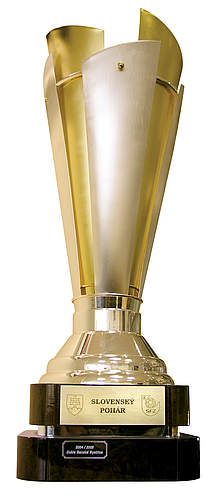
The trophy for the winner (2005–2018)

Season	Winner	Score	Runner-up	Venue	Attendance
1993–94	Slovan Bratislava	2–1	Tatran Prešov	Mestský štadión Brezno	5,620
1994–95	Inter Bratislava	1–1 (aet, 3–1 pen)	DAC Dunajská Streda	Mestský štadión (Dubnica)	2,550
1995–96	Humenné	2–1	Spartak Trnava	Štadión Bukóza	9,000
1996–97	Slovan Bratislava	1–0 (aet)	Tatran Prešov	Štadión na Sihoti	11,286
1997–98	Spartak Trnava	2–0	1. FC Košice	Stadium ŠKP Inter Dúbravka	7,800
1998–99	Slovan Bratislava	3–0	Dukla Banská Bystrica	Mestský štadión Žiar nad Hronom	10,048
1999–00	Inter Bratislava	1–1 (aet, 4–2 pen)	1. FC Košice	Tatran Stadium	3,150
2000–01	Inter Bratislava	1–0	Ružomberok	Mestský štadión (Dubnica)	5,200
2001–02	Senec	1–1 (aet, 4–2 pen)	Púchov	Štadión MŠK Považská Bystrica	4,584
2002–03	Púchov	2–1 (aet)	Slovan Bratislava	Vojtech Schottert Stadium	4,356
2003–04	Petržalka	2–0	Ličartovce	Mestský štadión Dunajská Streda	2,650
2004–05	Dukla Banská Bystrica	2–1	Petržalka	Štadión pod Zoborom	2,474
2005–06	Ružomberok	0–0 (aet, 4–3 pen)	Spartak Trnava	Štadión Pasienky	8,426
2006–07	Zlaté Moravce	4–0	Senec	Štadión Pasienky	3,119
2007–08	Petržalka	1–0	Spartak Trnava	Štadión pod Dubňom	5,000
2008–09	MFK Košice	3–1	Petržalka	NTC Senec	1,528
2009–10	Slovan Bratislava	6–0	Spartak Trnava	Štadión Michalovce	3,752
2010–11	Slovan Bratislava	3–3 (aet, 5–4 pen)	Žilina	SNP Stadium	2,653
2011–12	Žilina	3–2 (aet)	Senica	Mestský štadión Bardejov	3,000
2012–13	Slovan Bratislava	2–0	Žilina	Štadión pod Čebraťom	3,410
2013–14	MFK Košice	2–1	Slovan Bratislava	Stadium Myjava	2,647
2014–15	AS Trenčín	2–2 (aet, 3–2 pen)	Senica	NTC Poprad	3,473
2015–16	AS Trenčín	3–1	Slovan Bratislava	Štadión Antona Malatinského	8,547
2016–17	Slovan Bratislava	3–0	Skalica	NTC Poprad	2,432
2017–18	Slovan Bratislava	3–1	Ružomberok	Štadión Antona Malatinského	4,405
2018–19	Spartak Trnava	3–3 (aet, 4–1 pen)	Žilina	Štadión pod Zoborom	6,053
2019–20	Slovan Bratislava	1–0	Ružomberok	Tehelné pole	3,624
2020–21	Slovan Bratislava	2–1 (aet)	Žilina	Tehelné pole	0 (Note: The final was played behind closed doors due to the COVID-19 pandemic in Slovakia.)
2021–22	Spartak Trnava	2–1 (aet)	Slovan Bratislava	Tehelné pole	10,411
2022–23	Spartak Trnava	3–1 (aet)	Slovan Bratislava	Štadión Antona Malatinského	15,427
2023–24	Ružomberok	1–0	Spartak Trnava	Košická Futbalová Aréna	8,764
2024–25	Spartak Trnava	1–0	Ružomberok	DAC Aréna	9,437
2025–26	MŠK Žilina	3–1	FC Košice	Štadión pod Dubňom	9,723

Key

	Match went to extra time
	Match decided by a penalty shootout after extra time
Italic	Team from outside the top flight

== Performance by club ==
Club	Winners	Runners-up	Winning years	Runner-up years
Slovan Bratislava	17	7	1970, 1972, 1974, 1976, 1982, 1983, 1989, 1994, 1997, 1999, 2010, 2011, 2013, 2017, 2018, 2020, 2021	1971, 1978, 2003, 2014, 2016, 2022, 2023
Spartak Trnava	9	8	1971, 1975, 1980, 1991, 1998, 2019, 2022, 2023, 2025	1972, 1974, 1988, 1996, 2006, 2008, 2010, 2024
Inter Bratislava	6	2	1984, 1988, 1990, 1995, 2000, 2001	1976, 1979
VSS Košice	5	3	1973, 1980, 1993, 2009, 2014	1981, 1998, 2000
Lokomotíva Košice	3	1	1977, 1979, 1985	1992
Žilina	2	8	2012, 2026	1977, 1980, 1986, 1990, 2011, 2013, 2019, 2021
Ružomberok	2	4	2006, 2024	2001, 2018, 2020, 2025
Petržalka	2	3	2004, 2008	1982, 2005, 2009
Dukla Banská Bystrica	2	3	1981, 2005	1970, 1984, 1999
AS Trenčín	2	–	2015, 2016	–
Tatran Prešov	1	4	1992	1973, 1985, 1994, 1997
DAC Dunajská Streda	1	2	1987	1993, 1995
Púchov	1	1	2003	2002
Senec	1	1	2002	2007
Zlaté Moravce	1	–	2007	–
Humenné	1	–	1996	–
Jednota Trenčín	1	–	1978	–
Nitra	–	4	–	1975, 1983, 1987, 1991
Senica	–	2	–	2012, 2015
FC Košice	–	1	–	2026
Skalica	–	1	–	2017
Ličartovce	–	1	–	2004
Považská Bystrica	–	1	–	1989

== Titles by city ==
City	Titles	Winning clubs
Bratislava	25	Slovan Bratislava (17), Inter Bratislava (6), Artmedia Petržalka (2)
Trnava	9	Spartak Trnava (9)
Košice	8	VSS Košice (5), Lokomotíva Košice (3)
Trenčín	3	AS Trenčín (2), Jednota Trenčín (1)
Banská Bystrica	2	Dukla Banská Bystrica (2)
Ružomberok	2	Ružomberok (2)
Žilina	2	Žilina (2)
Dunajská Streda	1	DAC Dunajská Streda (1)
Humenné	1	Humenné (1)
Prešov	1	Tatran Prešov (1)
Púchov	1	Púchov (1)
Senec	1	Senec (1)
Zlaté Moravce	1	Zlaté Moravce (1)

== Venues of final matches ==
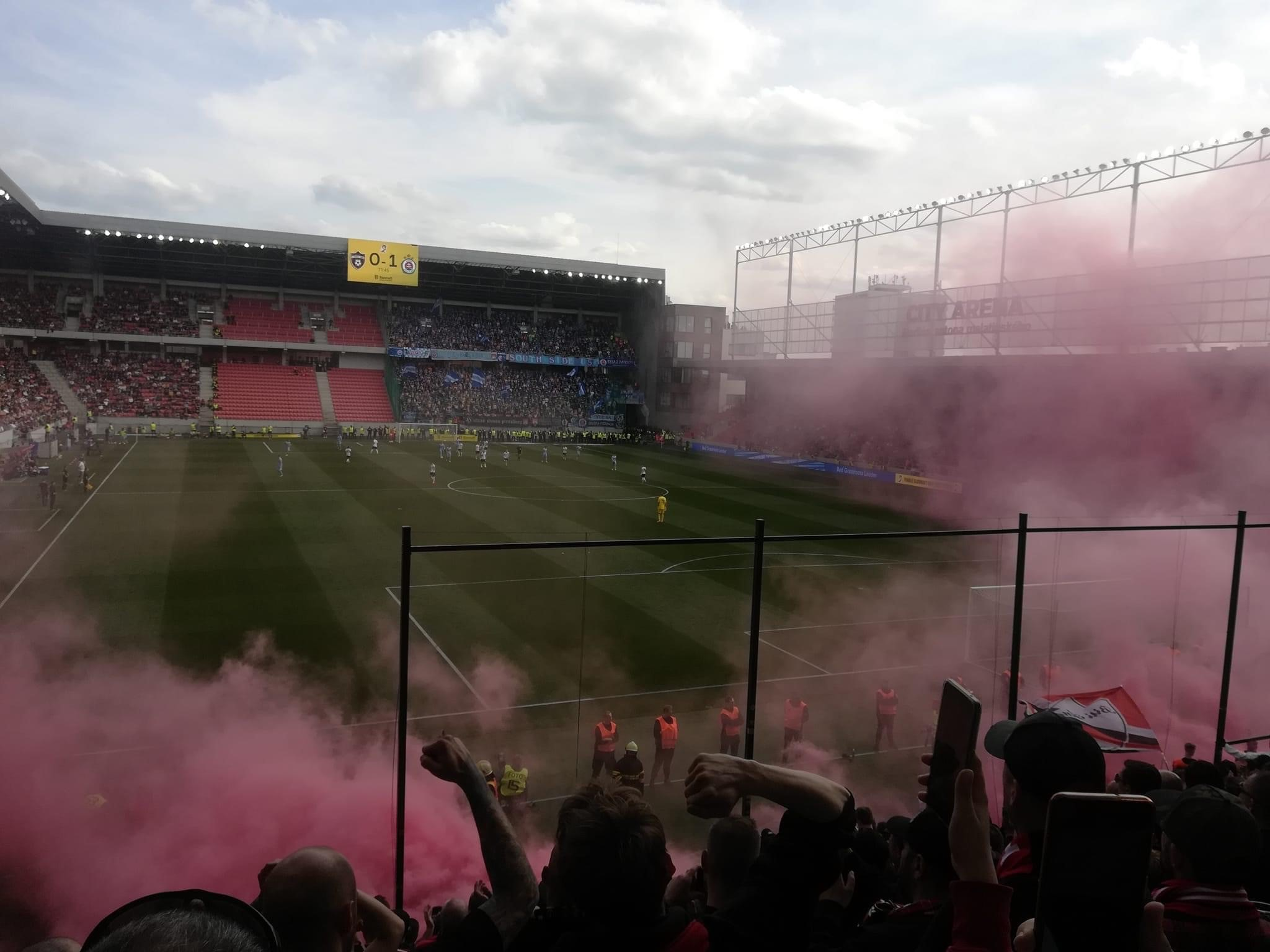

(Does not include matches when the home-away system was played)

Venue	Nr. of final matches	Years
Bratislava	6	1998, 2006, 2007, 2020, 2021, 2022
Trnava	4	1987, 2016, 2018, 2023
Dunajská Streda	2	2004, 2025
Nitra	2	2005, 2019
Poprad	2	2015, 2017
Ružomberok	2	1991, 2013
Dubnica	2	1995, 2001
Žiar nad Hronom	2	1990, 1999
Trenčín	2	1988, 1997
Žilina	2	2008, 2026
Košice	1	2024
Myjava	1	2014
Bardejov	1	2012
Banská Bystrica	1	2011
Michalovce	1	2010
Senec	1	2009
Topoľčany	1	2003
Považská Bystrica	1	2002
Prešov	1	2000
Vranov nad Topľov	1	1996
Brezno	1	1994
Rimavská Sobota	1	1993
Dolný Kubín	1	1992
Hlohovec	1	1989
Prievidza	1	1986
