= 2016 Slovak Cup final =

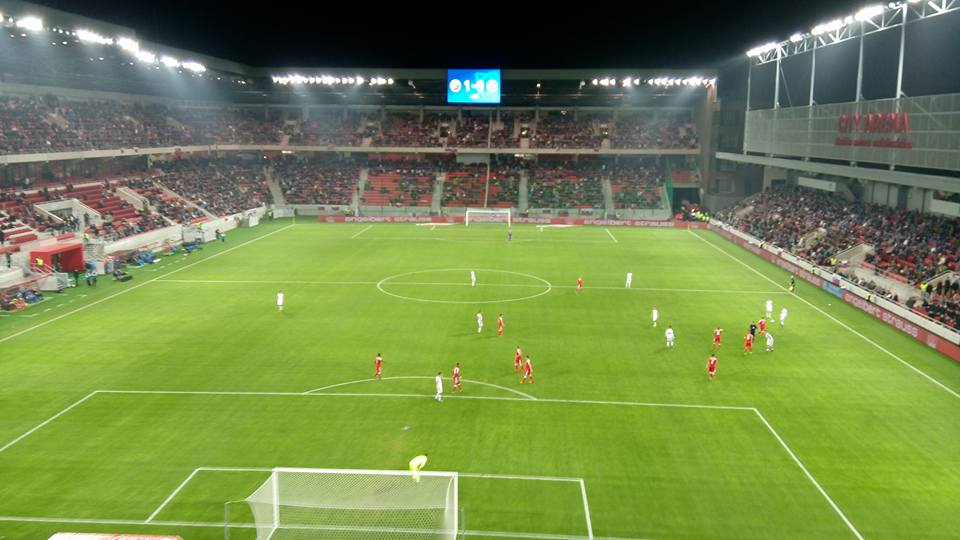
- The Štadión Antona Malatinského in Trnava held the final
- Event: 2015–16 Slovak Cup
Slovan Bratislava	Trenčín
1	3
- Date: 29 April 2016
- Venue: Štadión Antona Malatinského, Trnava
- Referee: Dušan Sedlák
- Attendance: 8,547

The 2016 Slovak Cup final decided the winner of the 2015–16 Slovak Cup, the 47th season of Slovakia's main football cup. It was played on 29 April 2016 at the Štadión Antona Malatinského in Trnava, between ŠK Slovan Bratislava and FK AS Trenčín. AS Trenčín defeated ŠK Slovan Bratislava 3-1.

== Road to the final ==
Note: In all results below, the score of the finalist is given first (H: home; A: away).

ŠK Slovan Bratislava		Round	FK AS Trenčín
Opponent	Result	2015–16 Slovak Cup	Opponent	Result
TJ Fatran Varín	8–0 (A)	Second Round	PŠC Pezinok	5–0 (A)
ŠK Vinica	8–0 (A)	Third Round	ŠK Závod	5–0 (A)
FC Nitra	3–2 (A)	Fourth Round	Jaslovské Bohunice	3–0 (A)
Pohronie	1–0 (H)	Round of 16	Dolný Kubín	4–1 (A)
Senica	1–1 (4–3 p) (A)	Quarter-finals	VSS Košice	2–1 (A)
Žilina	0–0 (H), 1–1 (A) (1–1 agg.)	Semi-finals	Ružomberok	5–1 (H), 1–0 (A) (6–1 agg.)

=== Details ===
29 April 2016
20:30 CEST (UTC+2)

Slovan Bratislava	1–3	Trenčín
Zreľák 53'	Report	Maierhofer 78' van Kessel 86', 90'

Štadión Antona Malatinského, Trnava
Attendance: 8,547
Referee: Dušan Sedlák

Slovan Bratislava	AS Trenčín

GK	82	(Slovakia) Ján Mucha
RB	88	(Greece) Vasileios Pliatsikas	(yellow card) 80'
CB	2	(Serbia) Boris Sekulić
CB	19	(Slovakia) Kornel Saláta
LB	39	(Czech Republic) Jakub Podaný
DM	18	(South Africa) Granwald Scott		(substituted off) 90'
CM	6	(Netherlands) Joeri De Kamps
CM	7	(Slovakia) František Kubík
RW	10	(Serbia) Marko Milinković (c)		(substituted off) 84'
CF	33	(Slovakia) Róbert Vittek
LW	9	(Slovakia) Adam Zreľák
Substitutes:
GK	22	(Slovakia) Dominik Greif
DF	5	(France) Claude Dielna
DF	28	(Slovakia) Juraj Kotula
CM	4	(Montenegro) Vukan Savićević		(substituted off) 90'
DM	27	(Serbia) Slobodan Simović
FW	17	(Bosnia and Herzegovina) Nermin Crnkić		(substituted on) 84'
FW	23	(Slovakia) Kevin Kele
Manager:
(Cyprus) Nikodimos Papavasiliou

GK	25	(Slovakia) Igor Šemrinec
RB	6	(Slovakia) Martin Šulek
CB	2	(Slovakia) Lukáš Skovajsa
CB	37	(Slovakia) Peter Kleščík (c)
LB	26	(Nigeria) Kingsley Madu
CM	8	(Netherlands) Ryan Koolwijk	(substituted off) 90'
CM	10	(Nigeria) Rabiu Ibrahim
CM	21	(Slovakia) Matúš Bero
RW	17	(Nigeria) Samuel Kalu	(substituted off) 66'
LW	19	(Slovakia) Dávid Guba	(substituted off) 66'
CF	9	(Curaçao) Gino van Kessel
Substitutes:
GK	30	(Slovakia) Adrián Chovan
DF	18	(England) James Lawrence	(substituted on) 90'
MF	14	(Slovakia) Jakub Holúbek
CM	20	(Slovakia) Matúš Opatovský
FW	16	(Nigeria) Aliko Bala
CF	7	(Netherlands) Mitchell Schet	(substituted on) 66'
FW	39	(Austria) Stefan Maierhofer	(substituted on) 66'
Manager:
(Slovakia) Martin Ševela

Match rules

- 90 minutes.
- 30 minutes of extra time if necessary.
- Penalty shoot-out if scores still level.
