= 1972–73 Czechoslovak First League =

Czechoslovak First League
- Season: 1972–73
- Champions: Spartak Trnava
- Relegated: TŽ Třinec; Spartak Hradec Králové
- European Cup: Spartak Trnava
- Cup Winners' Cup: Baník Ostrava
- UEFA Cup: Tatran Prešov; VSS Košice
- Top goalscorer: Ladislav Józsa (21 goals)

Statistics of Czechoslovak First League in the 1972–73 season.

== Overview ==
It was contested by 16 teams, and FC Spartak Trnava won the championship. Ladislav Józsa was the league's top scorer with 21 goals.

== Stadia and locations ==
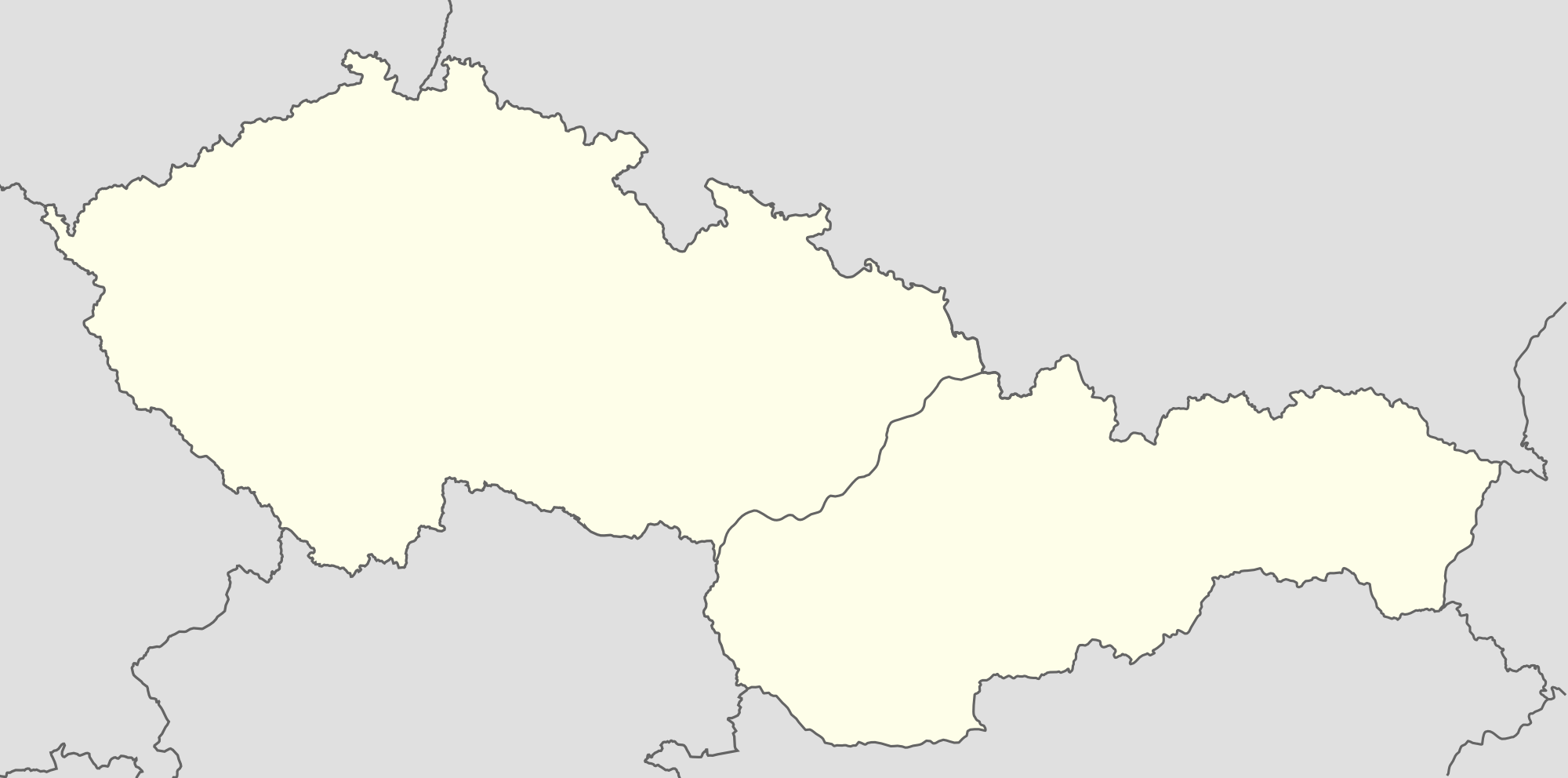
Location of clubs in the 1972–73 Czechoslovak First League

== Table ==
Pos	Team	Pld	W	D	L	GF	GA	GD	Pts	Qualification or relegation
1	Spartak Trnava (C)	30	16	7	7	47	20	+27	39	Qualification for European Cup first round
2	Tatran Prešov	30	17	4	9	42	30	+12	38	Qualification for UEFA Cup first round
3	VSS Košice	30	13	9	8	46	28	+18	35	Qualification for UEFA Cup first round
4	Dukla Prague	30	12	10	8	32	23	+9	34	
5	ZVL Žilina	30	14	5	11	50	38	+12	33	
6	Lokomotíva Košice	30	12	8	10	39	40	−1	32	
7	Baník Ostrava	30	11	8	11	32	34	−2	30	Qualification for Cup Winners' Cup first round
8	Slovan Bratislava	30	12	5	13	32	31	+1	29	
9	Sklo Union Teplice	30	12	4	14	37	34	+3	28	
10	Nitra	30	11	6	13	36	39	−3	28	
11	Sparta Prague	30	10	8	12	39	45	−6	28	
12	Zbrojovka Brno	30	10	7	13	43	45	−2	27	
13	Škoda Plzeň	30	10	6	14	32	44	−12	26	
14	Slavia Prague	30	8	9	13	30	41	−11	25	
15	TŽ Třinec (R)	30	7	11	12	24	39	−15	25	Relegation to Czechoslovak Second League
16	Spartak Hradec Králové (R)	30	9	5	16	25	55	−30	23	Relegation to Czechoslovak Second League

(C) Champions; (R) Relegated

== Results ==
Home \ Away	OST	DUK	LOK	NIT	TEP	PLZ	SLA	SLO	SPA	HRK	TRN	PRE	TŘI	KOŠ	BRN	ŽIL
Baník Ostrava		0–0	1–1	0–0	2–1	2–0	2–0	1–0	2–0	3–0	2–1	2–0	0–0	3–0	1–1	0–1
Dukla Prague	2–1		0–0	2–0	2–1	4–1	1–0	2–1	1–1	0–0	1–0	2–0	2–0	1–1	0–1	1–1
Lokomotíva Košice	3–1	1–0		2–1	1–0	2–0	1–1	3–0	4–1	3–1	0–2	1–2	1–1	1–0	4–1	3–2
Nitra	1–0	0–0	3–0		2–0	1–0	1–0	0–1	2–0	5–0	2–0	1–1	0–0	1–0	4–0	4–1
Sklo Union Teplice	2–0	3–2	2–2	4–2		1–0	2–0	1–0	1–0	5–0	3–0	3–0	2–0	1–1	1–1	0–1
Škoda Plzeň	1–1	0–1	3–1	3–0	0–1		1–1	2–0	1–0	1–0	1–0	3–1	3–2	1–1	5–2	2–0
Slavia Prague	1–3	1–0	2–1	2–0	3–1	2–2		4–0	2–1	2–1	0–0	0–2	1–1	0–0	2–2	1–2
Slovan Bratislava	2–1	1–0	2–0	2–0	1–1	0–0	2–0		2–2	7–0	0–0	1–0	2–0	0–1	2–0	2–0
Sparta Prague	2–1	2–2	0–0	2–1	2–0	1–1	3–0	2–1		2–1	2–1	0–1	2–0	2–2	1–3	3–1
Spartak Hradec Králové	0–0	1–3	0–0	3–0	1–0	1–0	2–0	1–0	3–2		0–1	0–0	2–0	2–1	2–0	2–2
Spartak Trnava	6–0	1–1	5–0	3–0	1–0	2–0	4–0	2–0	2–1	1–0		2–0	3–0	0–0	3–1	1–0
Tatran Prešov	4–0	2–0	1–1	4–1	3–0	2–0	1–0	2–0	3–1	1–0	0–0		3–1	1–0	2–0	3–2
TŽ Třinec	1–1	1–0	2–0	2–2	2–1	3–0	1–4	0–0	0–0	2–0	0–0	0–2		1–1	1–0	0–0
VSS Košice	1–0	0–1	3–1	1–1	1–0	4–1	0–0	4–0	4–0	6–2	2–1	2–1	2–0		3–0	5–0
Zbrojovka Brno	0–1	0–0	0–2	3–1	3–0	5–0	1–1	1–0	2–3	3–0	3–3	3–0	3–0	4–0		0–0
ZVL Žilina	3–1	2–1	3–0	3–0	1–0	3–0	3–0	1–3	1–1	5–0	1–2	4–0	2–3	2–0	3–0	

Source: statistiky1ligy.fotbal.cz
Legend: Blue = home team win; Yellow = draw; Red = away team win.

== Attendances ==
#	Club	Average	Highest
1	Sparta Praha	11,455	23,467
2	Spartak Trnava	10,970	28,000
3	Brno	10,886	21,422
4	Slavia Praha	9,295	12,792
5	Plzeň	8,935	27,632
6	Baník Ostrava	8,479	16,010
7	Hradec Králové	7,860	25,690
8	Slovan	7,311	23,450
9	Teplice	6,161	9,559
10	Tatran Prešov	5,741	14,823
11	Žilina	5,194	12,978
12	Nitra	4,738	10,958
13	VSS	4,647	10,135
14	Dukla Praha	4,478	12,834
15	Lokomotíva Košice	3,879	9,735
16	Třinec	3,665	5,631
