= 1976–77 Czechoslovak First League =

Czechoslovak First League
- Season: 1976–77
- Champions: Dukla Prague
- Relegated: Frýdek-Místek; VSS Košice
- European Cup: Dukla Prague
- Cup Winners' Cup: Lokomotíva Košice
- UEFA Cup: Inter Bratislava; Slavia Prague
- Top goalscorer: Ladislav Józsa (18 goals)

The 1976–77 Czechoslovak First League season statistics of the Czechoslovak First League in the 1976–77 season.

== Overview ==
It was contested by 16 teams, and Dukla Prague prevailed as the 1977 champions. Ladislav Józsa was the league's top scorer with 18 goals.

== Stadiums and locations ==
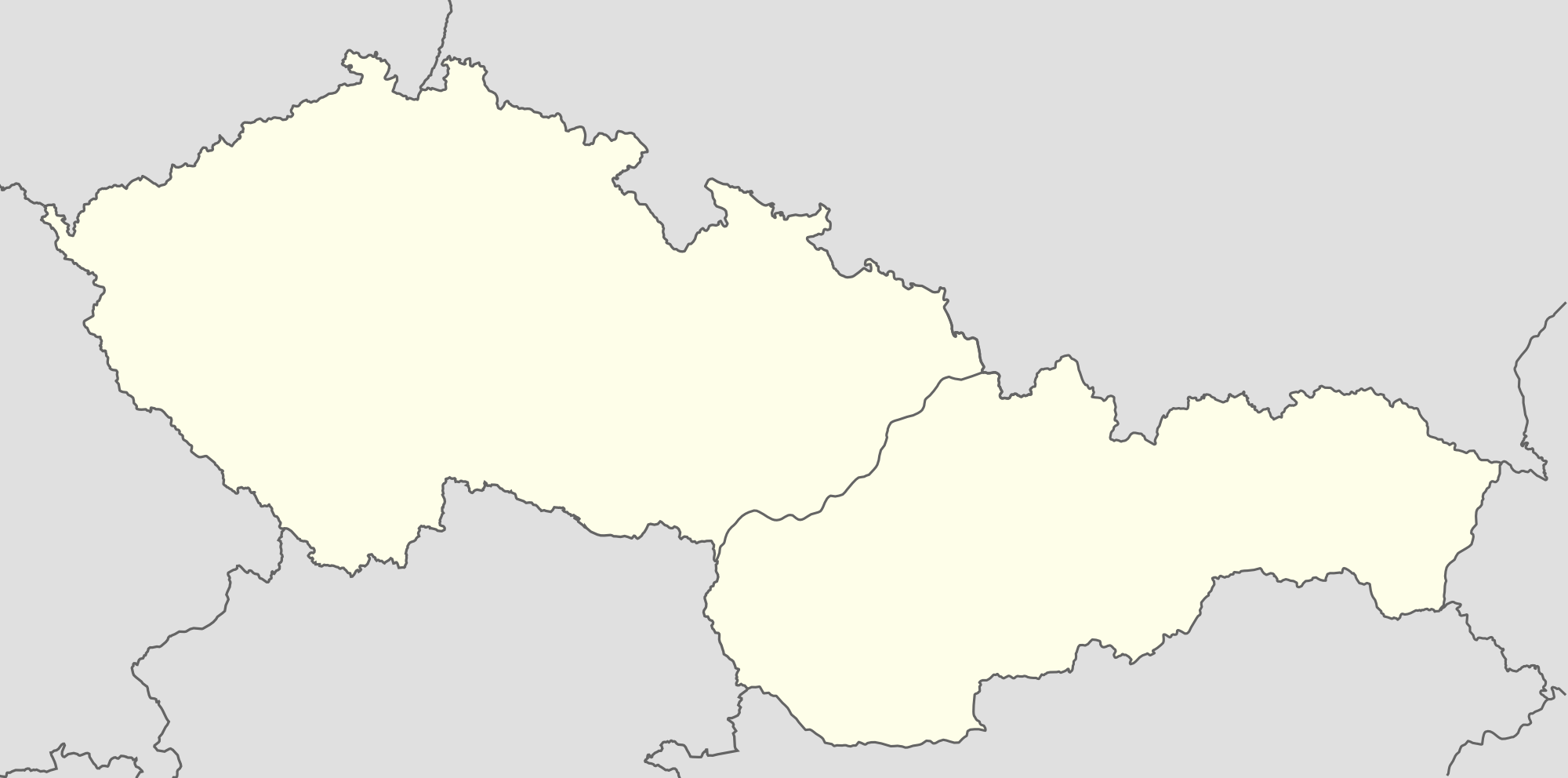
Location of clubs in the 1976–77 Czechoslovak First League

== League standings ==
Pos	Team	Pld	W	D	L	GF	GA	GD	Pts	Qualification or relegation
1	Dukla Prague (C)	30	18	6	6	61	33	+28	42	Qualification for European Cup first round
2	Inter Bratislava	30	16	6	8	55	36	+19	38	Qualification for UEFA Cup first round
3	Slavia Prague	30	13	10	7	53	36	+17	36	Qualification for UEFA Cup first round
4	Zbrojovka Brno	30	13	9	8	49	40	+9	35	
5	Lokomotíva Košice	30	16	1	13	60	59	+1	33	Qualification for Cup Winners' Cup first round
6	Škoda Plzeň	30	11	9	10	40	37	+3	31	
7	Baník Ostrava	30	11	8	11	36	33	+3	30	
8	Slovan Bratislava	30	12	5	13	44	38	+6	29	
9	Bohemians Prague	30	8	13	9	32	34	−2	29	
10	ZVL Žilina	30	10	9	11	40	43	−3	29	
11	Jednota Trenčín	30	10	9	11	41	48	−7	29	
12	Sklo Union Teplice	30	11	6	13	45	46	−1	28	
13	Sparta Prague	30	11	6	13	40	44	−4	28	
14	Spartak Trnava	30	9	8	13	26	47	−21	26	
15	Frýdek-Místek (R)	30	8	7	15	35	48	−13	23	Relegation to Czech National Football League
16	VSS Košice (R)	30	5	4	21	35	70	−35	14	Relegation to Slovak National Football League

Source: rsssf.com
(C) Champions; (R) Relegated

== Results ==
Home \ Away	OST	BOH	DUK	FRY	INT	TRE	LOK	TEP	PLZ	SLA	SLO	SPA	TRN	KOŠ	BRN	ŽIL
Baník Ostrava		1–1	0–0	1–0	2–1	3–1	3–1	1–1	2–0	1–1	2–1	2–0	4–0	1–0	2–2	4–0
Bohemians Prague	0–0		1–1	3–0	1–1	0–0	1–2	2–0	1–0	1–1	0–0	2–1	0–0	6–3	3–2	1–0
Dukla Prague	1–0	2–0		4–1	1–1	4–0	6–0	2–0	3–0	2–0	5–2	4–1	3–2	4–2	2–1	2–1
Frýdek-Místek	2–1	2–2	3–4		0–0	1–2	4–1	1–1	3–2	2–3	1–2	3–2	0–0	1–0	2–1	0–1
Inter Bratislava	1–0	2–0	2–2	1–1		1–0	4–2	3–0	3–2	3–1	1–0	3–1	4–0	4–0	3–0	3–2
Jednota Trenčín	2–0	2–0	2–0	1–1	1–2		3–0	3–1	0–2	2–5	1–1	2–1	3–1	2–0	0–0	1–1
Lokomotiva Košice	1–0	1–3	4–1	2–1	4–0	5–3		4–3	1–0	1–2	2–1	3–0	5–2	3–0	3–3	4–1
Sklo Union Teplice	2–0	1–1	0–2	4–0	3–2	3–1	0–1		1–1	2–1	3–0	1–0	5–0	4–1	0–0	1–0
Škoda Plzeň	2–2	1–0	0–0	2–1	2–1	0–0	3–0	1–1		2–2	1–0	2–0	1–0	3–0	1–1	2–0
Slavia Prague	2–0	0–0	0–1	2–0	2–1	4–0	2–4	4–2	2–2		2–1	1–1	3–0	5–0	2–1	1–1
Slovan Bratislava	3–0	4–0	2–0	1–0	2–0	3–3	2–0	0–1	4–0	2–1		1–1	0–2	2–1	2–0	5–0
Sparta Prague	1–1	0–0	2–1	0–1	2–0	2–0	4–2	3–1	2–1	1–2	3–0		2–0	3–0	3–1	1–1
Spartak Trnava	0–2	1–0	1–0	2–0	0–3	2–2	1–0	2–1	1–1	0–0	2–0	1–1		2–0	1–1	1–0
VSS Košice	2–0	3–1	2–3	0–0	1–2	1–2	1–2	3–1	3–6	1–0	2–2	0–1	2–2		4–1	1–1
Zbrojovka Brno	3–1	2–1	0–0	2–1	3–2	2–0	2–1	3–1	2–0	2–2	1–0	3–0	3–0	3–2		3–0
ZVL Žilina	2–0	1–1	3–1	1–3	1–1	2–2	3–1	4–1	1–0	0–0	3–1	5–1	1–0	3–0	1–1	

Source: statistiky1ligy.fotbal.cz
Legend: Blue = home team win; Yellow = draw; Red = away team win.

== Attendances ==
#	Club	Average	Highest
1	Slavia Praha	12,019	21,231
2	Brno	11,398	25,312
3	Sparta Praha	10,857	22,537
4	Baník Ostrava	7,980	17,180
5	Bohemians	7,640	15,000
6	Spartak Trnava	6,618	11,864
7	Slovan	6,506	14,926
8	Frýdek-Místek	5,944	10,276
9	Trenčín	5,800	8,961
10	Lokomotíva Košice	5,697	12,782
11	Teplice	5,593	14,853
12	Dukla Praha	5,113	14,710
13	Plzeň	4,367	11,621
14	Inter Bratislava	4,080	8,256
15	Žilina	3,762	7,763
16	VSS	2,897	8,410
