= 1968–69 Czechoslovak First League =

Czechoslovak First League
- Season: 1968–69
- Champions: Spartak Trnava
- Relegated: Dukla Banská Bystrica; VCHZ Pardubice
- European Cup: Spartak Trnava
- Cup Winners' Cup: Slovan Bratislava; Dukla Prague
- Fairs Cup: Sparta Prague; Baník Ostrava
- Top goalscorer: Ladislav Petráš (20 goals)

Statistics of Czechoslovak First League in the 1968–69 season.

== Overview ==
It was contested by 14 teams, and Spartak Trnava won the championship. Ladislav Petráš was the league's top scorer with 20 goals.

== Stadia and locations ==
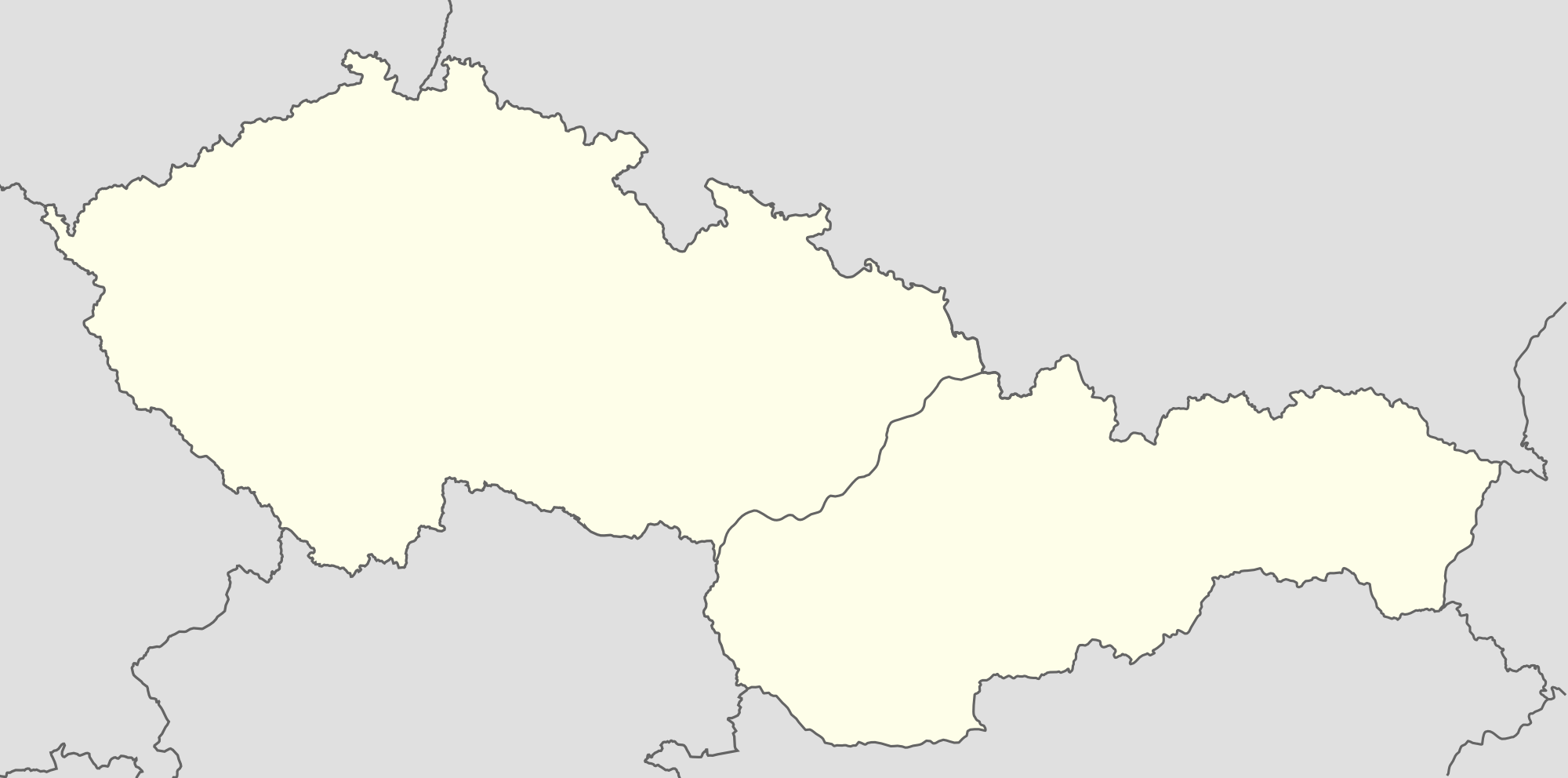
Location of clubs in the 1968–69 Czechoslovak First League

== League standings ==
Pos	Team	Pld	W	D	L	GF	GA	GD	Pts	Qualification or relegation
1	Spartak Trnava (C)	26	17	5	4	50	21	+29	39	Qualification for European Cup first round
2	Slovan Bratislava	26	12	10	4	35	18	+17	34	Qualification for Cup Winners' Cup first round (Note: Slovan Bratislava qualified for the Cup Winners' Cup as defending champions.)
3	Sparta Prague	26	12	5	9	36	27	+9	29	Invitation for Inter-Cities Fairs Cup first round
4	Inter Bratislava	26	8	10	8	35	26	+9	26	
5	Dukla Prague	26	10	5	11	52	37	+15	25	Qualification for Cup Winners' Cup first round
6	Jednota Trenčín	26	9	7	10	35	35	0	25	
7	ZVL Žilina	26	9	7	10	29	38	−9	25	
8	VSS Košice	26	10	4	12	32	28	+4	24	
9	Baník Ostrava	26	8	8	10	22	37	−15	24	Invitation for Inter-Cities Fairs Cup first round
10	FC Lokomotíva Košice	26	9	6	11	23	39	−16	24	
11	Slavia Prague	26	10	3	13	26	37	−11	23	
12	Sklo Union Teplice	26	9	4	13	34	40	−6	22	
13	Dukla Banská Bystrica (Note: Dukla Banská Bystrica has two points deducted.) (R)	26	10	3	13	39	41	−2	21	Relegation to Czechoslovak Second League
14	VCHZ Pardubice (R)	26	7	7	12	23	47	−24	21	Relegation to Czechoslovak Second League

Source: rsssf.com
(C) Champions; (R) Relegated

== Results ==
Home \ Away	OST	BB	DUK	INT	TRE	LOK	TEP	SLA	SLO	SPA	TRN	PAR	KOŠ	ŽIL
Baník Ostrava		2–1	0–0	0–0	1–0	3–2	3–1	0–0	1–1	3–0	0–0	0–3	0–2	1–0
Dukla Banská Bystrica	5–0		3–1	1–0	1–1	1–1	3–2	4–0	1–2	1–0	1–0	6–1	2–0	2–1
Dukla Prague	3–0	3–1		1–1	2–0	0–1	2–1	4–0	1–2	1–2	0–1	9–0	2–0	5–1
Inter Bratislava	0–2	5–1	3–3		3–1	1–3	3–0	2–1	0–1	2–0	0–1	5–0	0–0	4–1
Jednota Trenčín	4–1	2–1	3–2	0–0		5–2	5–0	2–0	0–0	2–1	1–2	1–0	3–1	0–2
Lokomotíva Košice	0–2	1–0	0–4	1–2	1–0		1–1	1–0	1–3	0–0	2–0	2–0	1–0	0–0
Sklo Union Teplice	0–0	4–0	2–0	2–2	4–1	1–0		0–1	2–1	1–0	2–3	3–0	1–0	2–1
Slavia Prague	2–0	3–0	0–0	0–0	3–2	3–0	2–1		0–3	1–0	1–2	3–0	1–0	2–0
Slovan Bratislava	2–0	0–0	5–1	0–0	0–0	0–0	3–1	4–0		2–0	1–1	1–1	1–0	0–0
Sparta Prague	5–0	2–1	1–1	1–0	1–1	4–0	1–0	3–2	2–0		3–1	1–0	1–0	5–0
Spartak Trnava	2–1	3–1	2–1	3–1	2–0	3–0	2–0	4–0	3–0	3–3		3–0	1–0	6–0
VCHZ Pardubice	2–0	2–0	0–1	1–1	0–0	4–0	3–2	2–0	0–0	0–0	1–1		2–1	1–1
VSS Košice	1–1	4–2	4–3	2–0	5–1	1–1	2–0	2–1	0–2	2–0	0–0	3–0		2–0
ZVL Žilina	1–1	1–0	4–2	0–0	0–0	1–2	1–1	1–0	3–1	3–0	2–1	3–0	2–0	

Source: statistiky1ligy.fotbal.cz
Legend: Blue = home team win; Yellow = draw; Red = away team win.

== Attendances ==
#	Club	Average	Highest
1	Sparta Praha	16,997	32,048
2	Baník Ostrava	13,728	26,070
3	Slavia Praha	12,759	26,953
4	Slovan	10,626	33,908
5	Spartak Trnava	9,306	15,137
6	Pardubice	7,793	12,200
7	Teplice	6,938	13,134
8	Dukla Praha	6,772	27,248
9	Dukla Banská Bystrica	6,239	17,900
10	Žilina	5,950	12,632
11	Trenčín	5,465	13,697
12	VSS	5,168	10,892
13	Inter Bratislava	3,874	9,050
14	Lokomotíva Košice	3,357	6,886
