= Jozef Jankech =

Slovak football coach (born 1937)

Personal information
- Date of birth: 24 October 1937 (age 89)
- Place of birth: Šaľa, Czechoslovakia
- Position: Right winger

Youth career
- 1947–: Šaľa

Senior career*
| Years | Team | Apps | (Gls) |
| –1956 | Šaľa | | |
| 1957–1958 | Uherské Hradiště | | |
| 1959–1965 | TTS Trenčín | | |
| 1965–1966 | TŽ Třinec | | |

Managerial career
- 1966–1973: TŽ Třinec
- 1973–1975: VSS Košice
- 1975–1976: Lokomotíva Košice
- 1976–1978: Strojárne Martin
- 1978–1980: Lokomotíva Košice
- 1980–1983: Nea Salamina
- 1983–1985: Lokomotíva Košice
- 1985–1987: ZVL Žilina
- 1985–1987: Czechoslovakia olympic team
- 1987–1988: TTS Trenčín
- 1988–1990: ŠK Slovan Bratislava
- 1990–1991: Kuala Lumpur FA
- 1991: Jednota VSS Košice
- 1991–1992: Inter Bratislava
- 1993: Slovan Poľnonákup Levice
- 1993–1994: Qatar SC
- 1994–1995: Slovan Levice
- 1995–1998: Slovakia
- 1998–1999: ZŤS Dubnica
- 2000–2003: Maldives & Maldives U23
- 2003–2004: ZŤS Dubnica
- 2005–2007: ŠK Slovan Bratislava
- 2007–2008: Maldives
- 2008–2010: Dukla Banská Bystrica
- 2010: ŠK Slovan Bratislava
- * Club domestic league appearances and goals

Jozef Jankech is a Slovak football coach. He was the second manager of the Slovak national team.

== Playing career ==
Jankech began with football in his native town Šaľa. He played for Šaľa from the age of ten, later he left to play for Uherské Hradiště, then played for TTS Trenčín and he ended his career in TŽ Třinec as 29 years old. The first club in which he started coaching was TŽ Třinec. His playing career was not as successful as his coaching career.

== Managing career ==
Jankech was one of the few Slovak football globetrotters. He trained in foreign several exotic teams such as Kuala Lumpur, Qatar Sports Club or twice in national team of Maldives. Jankech starting his managerial career as ending player in Czech team TŽ Třinec. Then followed stage in Košice where he trained at first VSS Košice and then Lokomotíva Košice. In 1980 coming the first foreign job in Cyprian team Nea Salamina Larnaka. Jankech also trained Czechoslovakia olympic team. Meanwhile, he was coach in TTS Trenčín.

On 4 July 1995 he became the second Slovak football trainer after Jozef Vengloš. Jankech completed two qualification cycles, first for Euro 96 and second for the 1998 World Cup. He achieved several very good results against strong opponents such as victories over Czech Republic, Poland and Croatia at the friendly match and draws against France and Yugoslavia. He failed to progress at the championship.

Jankech won SAFF Championship in 2008 with Maldives. It was the best success of Maldivian national team in history.

In December 2008 Jankech moved to Dukla Banská Bystrica.

== Honour ==
He was also a part in a Czech online football manager BREJK, where he was a pro bono 100% (best in game) couch for 15 days for a winner of brejktip, quiz in that manager. He was there nicknamed as Jozef Hlavatý. picture from game

== Honours ==
=== Manager ===
Lokomotíva Košice

- Czechoslovak Cup: 1977, 1979

Slovan Bratislava

- 2. liga: Runners-up: 2005-06 (Promoted)

Maldives

- SAFF Championship: 2008

== See also ==
- List of football managers with the most matches
