= 1973–74 Czechoslovak First League =

Czechoslovak First League
- Season: 1973–74
- Champions: Slovan Bratislava
- Relegated: Lokomotíva Košice; Tatran Prešov
- European Cup: Slovan Bratislava
- Cup Winners' Cup: Slavia Prague
- UEFA Cup: Dukla Prague; Baník Ostrava
- Top goalscorer: Ladislav Józsa; Přemysl Bičovský (17 goals each)

Statistics of Czechoslovak First League in the 1973–74 season.

== Overview ==
It was contested by 16 teams, and ŠK Slovan Bratislava won the championship. Ladislav Józsa and Přemysl Bičovský were the league's top scorers with 17 goals each.

== Stadia and locations ==
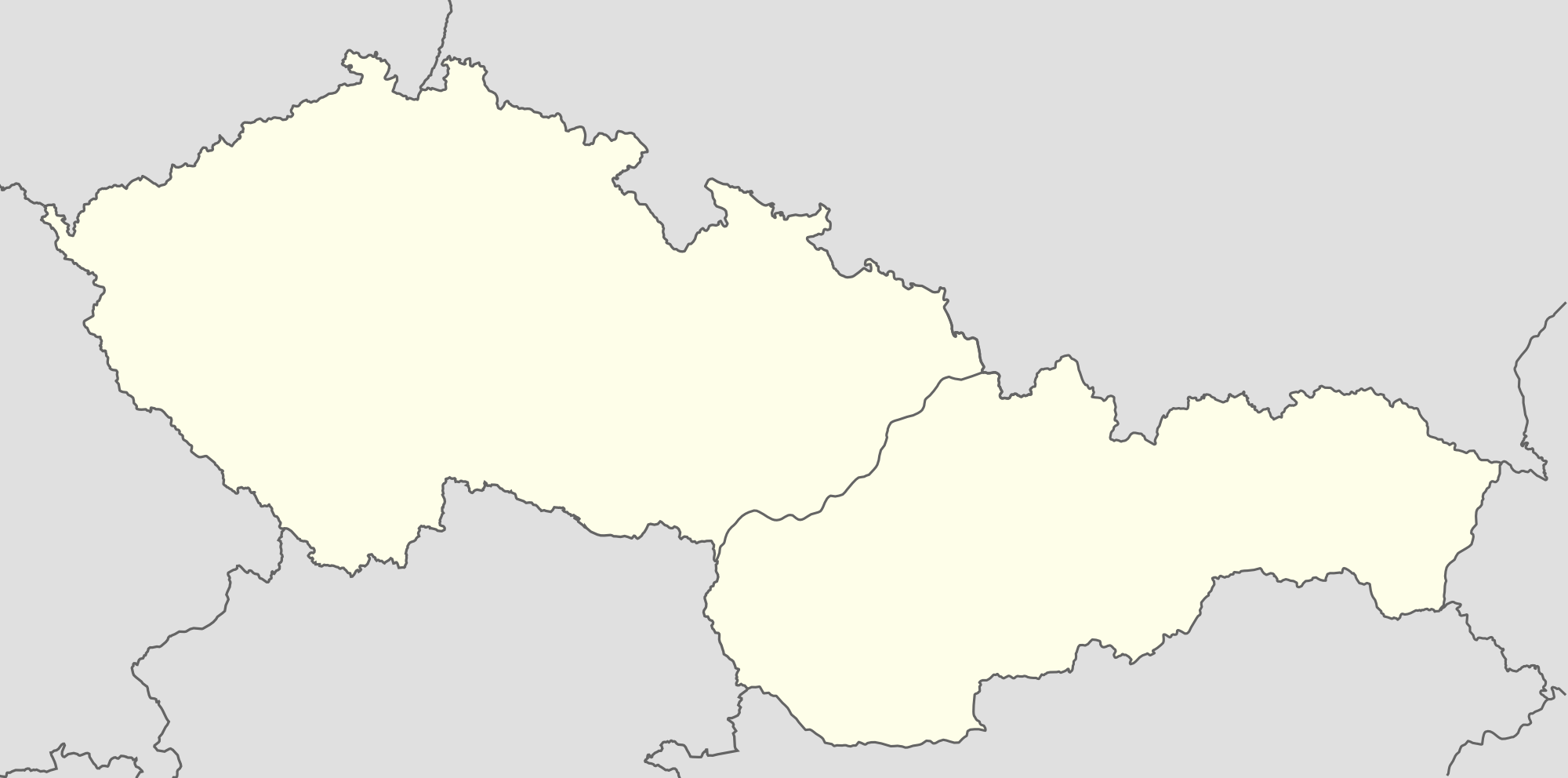
Location of clubs in the 1973–74 Czechoslovak First League

== League standings ==
Pos	Team	Pld	W	D	L	GF	GA	GD	Pts	Qualification or relegation
1	Slovan Bratislava (C)	30	15	7	8	58	39	+19	37	Qualification for European Cup first round
2	Dukla Prague	30	14	7	9	42	34	+8	35	Qualification for UEFA Cup first round
3	Slavia Prague	30	16	2	12	47	38	+9	34	Qualification for Cup Winners' Cup first round
4	Baník Ostrava	30	14	6	10	40	42	−2	34	Qualification for UEFA Cup first round
5	ZVL Žilina	30	14	2	14	39	42	−3	30	
6	Sklo Union Teplice	30	11	7	12	42	39	+3	29	
7	Spartak Trnava	30	8	13	9	32	31	+1	29	
8	Sparta Prague	30	11	7	12	37	39	−2	29	
9	VSS Košice	30	11	7	12	41	45	−4	29	
10	Zbrojovka Brno	30	12	5	13	33	37	−4	29	
11	Nitra	30	10	9	11	38	50	−12	29	
12	Bohemians Prague	30	10	8	12	43	42	+1	28	
13	Inter Bratislava	30	11	6	13	45	46	−1	28	
14	Škoda Plzeň	30	10	8	12	38	46	−8	28	
15	Lokomotíva Košice (R)	30	10	7	13	50	47	+3	27	Relegation to Czechoslovak Second League
16	Tatran Prešov (R)	30	8	9	13	35	43	−8	25	Relegation to Czechoslovak Second League

Source: rsssf.com
(C) Champions; (R) Relegated

== Results ==
Home \ Away	OST	BOH	DUK	INT	LOK	NIT	TEP	PLZ	SLA	SLO	SPA	TRN	PRE	KOŠ	BRN	ŽIL
Baník Ostrava		3–2	2–2	4–2	2–1	4–0	2–1	0–1	0–2	2–1	1–2	1–0	0–0	2–0	3–1	1–0
Bohemians Prague	5–0		3–2	1–0	2–1	0–0	0–0	3–2	3–1	1–1	3–0	1–1	4–1	1–1	2–0	4–0
Dukla Prague	0–1	1–0		4–0	1–1	2–1	1–1	1–0	1–0	2–2	2–0	2–0	1–0	0–1	2–0	3–1
Inter Bratislava	2–1	1–0	3–1		4–2	2–0	4–0	6–1	1–3	2–3	1–0	1–1	1–0	4–1	3–0	0–1
Lokomotíva Košice	5–1	3–1	0–2	3–0		5–1	4–2	3–1	1–1	1–0	3–0	0–0	1–1	3–2	3–2	1–2
Nitra	3–1	1–1	3–1	2–2	3–0		2–0	2–1	3–2	1–1	1–1	0–0	3–2	1–2	1–0	2–2
Sklo Union Teplice	1–1	2–0	1–2	1–1	3–2	3–0		2–0	2–1	2–1	2–2	2–1	4–0	2–0	3–0	4–0
Škoda Plzeň	2–0	2–0	0–0	1–1	1–1	0–0	1–1		1–0	3–1	3–0	3–1	1–1	5–3	4–3	1–0
Slavia Prague	0–1	3–0	2–1	3–1	3–2	0–1	1–0	5–0		5–1	1–0	2–0	1–0	3–1	1–0	1–0
Slovan Bratislava	2–3	2–1	3–0	3–0	0–0	4–2	2–0	1–1	5–1		2–0	2–0	5–1	3–0	3–1	2–0
Sparta Prague	0–0	3–1	2–0	3–0	3–2	3–1	3–1	1–0	4–1	1–1		0–0	2–0	1–2	0–0	3–2
Spartak Trnava	2–2	1–1	1–1	2–2	1–1	1–0	2–1	2–0	3–0	3–2	1–1		3–0	1–0	0–1	3–0
Tatran Prešov	2–0	1–1	2–4	1–0	5–1	7–1	0–0	0–0	0–0	3–0	2–0	1–1		0–0	0–1	2–1
VSS Košice	0–0	5–1	1–1	1–1	1–0	1–0	3–0	3–1	3–1	2–3	3–1	1–0	1–2		0–0	1–1
Zbrojovka Brno	0–2	2–0	2–0	1–0	1–0	1–1	1–0	3–1	1–2	1–1	1–0	1–1	4–0	3–1		1–0
ZVL Žilina	3–0	2–1	1–2	2–0	1–0	1–2	2–1	2–1	2–1	0–1	2–1	2–0	2–1	4–1	3–1	

Source: statistiky1ligy.fotbal.cz
Legend: Blue = home team win; Yellow = draw; Red = away team win.

== Attendances ==
#	Club	Average	Highest
1	Sparta Praha	13,213	24,736
2	Slavia Praha	11,017	25,802
3	Slovan	10,437	20,326
4	Baník Ostrava	9,964	25,681
5	Brno	9,411	25,547
6	Bohemians	8,765	13,677
7	Plzeň	8,580	20,266
8	Spartak Trnava	8,115	17,656
9	Teplice	7,976	15,632
10	Nitra	6,511	12,422
11	Inter Bratislava	5,913	20,381
12	Lokomotíva Košice	4,803	15,606
13	Dukla Praha	4,729	14,954
14	Tatran Prešov	4,671	9,891
15	VSS	4,579	10,612
16	Žilina	4,129	9,517
