= 1999–2000 Slovak Cup =

Tournament details
- Country: Slovakia
- Teams: 42

Final positions
- Champions: Inter Bratislava
- Runners-up: 1. FC Košice

The 1999–2000 Slovak Cup was the 31st season of Slovakia's annual knock-out cup competition and the seventh since the independence of Slovakia. It began on 25 July 1999 with the matches of preliminary round and ended on 8 May 2000 with the final. The winners of the competition earned a place in the first round of the UEFA Cup. Slovan Bratislava were the defending champions.

== Preliminary round ==
The first legs were played on 25 July 1999. The second legs were played on 4 August 1999.

Team 1	Agg.	Team 2	1st leg	2nd leg
Inter Bratislava B	3–2	Slovan Turá Lúka	1–1	2–1
Slovan Levice	beat	SH Senica	1–0	?
SFC Kalinkovo	1–8	Slovan Duslo Šaľa	1–2	1–6
Tesla Stropkov	1–2	Petrochema Dubová	1–0	0–2
Lokomotíva Košice	2–1	Žiar nad Hronom	1–1	1–0
Spišská Nová Ves	2–3	Turňa nad Bodvou	1–1	1–2

== First round ==
The games were played on 21 and 22 September 1999.

Team 1	Score	Team 2
Inter Bratislava B	1–4	Ozeta Dukla Trenčín
Slovan Levice	1–2	FC Nitra
ŠKP Devín	2–2 (5–6 p)	Koba Senec
Nové Zámky	1–1 (6–7 p)	Artmedia Petržalka
Matador Púchov	3–2	Slovan Bratislava
NCHZ Nováky	6–0	MŠK Žilina
Steel Trans Ličartovce	5–1	Baník Prievidza
Turňa nad Bodvou	0–1	HFC Humenné
Železiarne Podbrezová	2–2 (4–5 p)	Kerametal Dubnica nad Váhom
BSC JAS Bardejov	0–4	1. FC Košice
PFK Piešťany	0–1	DAC Dunajská Streda
Slovan Duslo Šaľa	0–2	Inter Bratislava
Slovan Bratislava B	1–2	Spartak Trnava
Tauris Rimavská Sobota	0–1	Dukla Banská Bystrica
Petrochema Dubová	1–5	SCP Ružomberok
Lokomotíva Košice	1–1 (1–3 p)	Tatran Prešov

== Second round ==
The games were played on 12 October 1999.

Team 1	Score	Team 2
Koba Senec	2–0	SCP Ružomberok
Steel Trans Ličartovce	0–1	Artmedia Petržalka
Tatran Prešov	0–2	Inter Bratislava
DAC Dunajská Streda	4–0	HFC Humenné
1. FC Košice	3–1	Ozeta Dukla Trenčín
Kerametal Dubnica nad Váhom	1–2	NCHZ Nováky
FC Nitra	1–1 (6–7 p)	Dukla Banská Bystrica
Spartak Trnava	2–0	Matador Púchov

== Quarter-finals ==
The games were played on 26 October 1999.

Team 1	Score	Team 2
Artmedia Petržalka	1–2	1. FC Košice
NCHZ Nováky	2–4	Inter Bratislava
Spartak Trnava	3–1	Koba Senec
DAC Dunajská Streda	1–2	Dukla Banská Bystrica

== Semi-finals ==
The first legs were played on 4 April 2000. The second legs were played on 18 April 2000.

=== First legs ===
4 April 2000	Dukla Banská Bystrica	1–1	1. FC Košice	Banská Bystrica
15:30	Faktor 89'	Report	T. Zátek 54'	Stadium: Štadión SNP Štiavničky; Referee: Artúr Jakubec

4 April 2000	Spartak Trnava	0–1	Inter Bratislava	Trnava
18:00		Report	Lalik 87'	Stadium: Anton Malatinský Stadium; Referee: Rudolf Weiss

=== Second legs ===
18 April 2000	1. FC Košice	1–0 (2–1 agg.)	Dukla Banská Bystrica	Košice
15:30	Semeník 18'	Report		Stadium: Štadión Lokomotívy; Attendance: 800; Referee: Gabriel Sekereš

18 April 2000	Inter Bratislava	2–1 (3–1 agg.)	Spartak Trnava	Bratislava
15:30	Kratochvíl 40', 61'	Report	Bukovič 50'	Stadium: Štadión Pasienky; Attendance: 1,500; Referee: Jozef Ligocký

== Final ==
8 May 2000
17:00 CEST

1. FC Košice	1–1 (a.e.t.)	Inter Bratislava
Kozák 50'	Report	Sz. Németh 38'
Penalties
Semeník (penalty scored); Lyubarskyi (penalty scored); T. Zátek (penalty missed); Kráľ (penalty missed)	2–4	(penalty scored) Kratochvil; (penalty scored) Pinte; (penalty scored) Ľalík; (penalty scored) Ševela

Štadión Tatran, Prešov
Attendance: 3,150
Referee: Ladislav Gádoši
