= Anton Flešár =

Slovak footballer (1944–2024)

Personal information
- Date of birth: 8 May 1944
- Place of birth: Stropkov, Slovak Republic
- Date of death: 11 April 2024 (aged 79)
- Place of death: Košice
- Position: Goalkeeper

Youth career
- Stropkov

Senior career*
Years	Team	Apps	(Gls)
1962–1964	Partizán Bardejov		
1964–1966	Dukla Prague		
1966–1979	Lokomotíva Košice		
1979–1984	VSŽ Košice		

International career
1970–1972	Czechoslovakia	2	(0)
- * Club domestic league appearances and goals

Anton Flešár (8 May 1944 – 11 April 2024) was a Slovak footballer who played as a goalkeeper. He was sometimes deployed as a forward in the Czechoslovak Cup. His breakthrough came in Lokomotíva Košice where he spent most of his career. He overall made 260 appearances at the Czechoslovak First League. Flešár earned two caps for the Czechoslovakia national team debuting against Luxembourg on 9 May 1970. He was a third choice of Czechoslovak manager Jozef Marko at the 1970 FIFA World Cup. Flešár died in Košice on 11 April 2024, at the age of 79.

== Honours ==
Dukla Prague

- Czechoslovak First League: 1965–66

Lokomotíva Košice

- Czechoslovak Cup: 1977
