= 1999–2000 Slovak Superliga =

Mars superliga
- Season: 1999–2000
- Dates: 24 July 1999 – 17 May 2000
- Champions: Inter Bratislava
- Relegated: VTJ Koba Senec; ZTS Kerametal Dubnica; 1. HFC Humenné; FC Nitra; DAC Dunajská Streda; Dukla Banská Bystrica; Baník Prievidza
- Champions League: Inter Bratislava
- UEFA Cup: 1. FC Košice; Slovan Bratislava
- Intertoto Cup: Ozeta Dukla Trenčín
- Matches played: 240
- Goals scored: 592 (2.47 per match)
- Top goalscorer: Szilárd Németh (16 goals)
- Biggest home win: Inter 7:0 Prievidza
- Biggest away win: Senec 0:5 Inter
- Highest scoring: Inter 7:0 Prievidza; Trenčín 5:2 B.Bystrica; Prievidza 4:3 Petržalka
- Average attendance: ▼3,041

The 1999–2000 Slovak First Football League (known as the Mars superliga for sponsorship reasons) was the seventh season of first-tier football league in Slovakia, since its establishment in 1993. It began on 24 July 1999 and ended on 17 May 2000. ŠK Slovan Bratislava were the defending champions.

== Format changes ==
The season was the last one in which 16 teams competed, as Mars superliga decided that the league would be reduced to 10 teams the following season. Therefore, seven teams were relegated to the 2. Liga and only one was promoted from the 2. Liga.

== Teams ==
A total of 16 teams was contested in the league, including 14 sides from the 1998–99 season and two promoted from the 2. Liga.

FC Rimavská Sobota and BSC JAS Bardejov was relegated to the 1999–2000 2. Liga. The two relegated teams were replaced by FK DAC 1904 Dunajská Streda and FK VTJ Koba Senec.

=== Stadiums and locations ===
Location of teams in 1999–2000 Mars superliga

Team	Home city	Stadium	Capacity
1. HFC Humenné	Humenné	Chemlon Stadion	10,000
1. FC Košice	Košice	Lokomotíva Stadium	9,000
Artmedia Petržalka	Petržalka	Štadión Petržalka	7,500
DAC 1904 Dunajská Streda	Dunajská Streda	Mestský štadión - DAC Dunajská Streda	16,410
Dukla Banská Bystrica	Banská Bystrica	SNP Stadium	10,000
Inter Slovnaft Bratislava	Bratislava	Štadión Pasienky	12,000
FC Nitra	Nitra	Štadión pod Zoborom	11,384
MFK Baník Prievidza	Prievidza	Futbalový štadión Prievidza	6,000
MFK SCP Ružomberok	Ružomberok	Štadión MFK Ružomberok	4,817
MŠK Žilina	Žilina	Štadión pod Dubňom	11,181
Ozeta Dukla Trenčín	Trenčín	Štadión na Sihoti	4,500
Slovan Bratislava	Bratislava	Tehelné pole	30,085
Spartak Trnava	Trnava	Štadión Antona Malatinského	18,448
Tatran Prešov	Prešov	Tatran Štadión	14,000
VTJ Koba Senec	Senec	Koba Senec Stadion	5,000
ZTS Kerametal Dubnica	Dubnica	Štadión Zimný	5,450

== League table ==
Pos	Team	Pld	W	D	L	GF	GA	GD	Pts	Qualification or relegation
1	Inter Bratislava (C)	30	21	7	2	65	16	+49	70	Qualification for Champions League second qualifying round
2	1. FC Košice	30	19	4	7	57	31	+26	61	Qualification for UEFA Cup qualifying round
3	Slovan Bratislava	30	16	9	5	52	18	+34	57	Qualification for UEFA Cup qualifying round
4	Spartak Trnava	30	15	8	7	38	21	+17	53	
5	Ozeta Dukla Trenčín	30	13	8	9	38	29	+9	47	Qualification for Intertoto Cup first round
6	Tatran Prešov	30	14	5	11	38	42	−4	47	
7	Ružomberok	30	13	7	10	29	26	+3	46	
8	Žilina	30	12	5	13	39	37	+2	41	
9	Artmedia Petržalka	30	11	6	13	43	48	−5	39	
10	Koba Senec (R)	30	9	10	11	33	36	−3	37	Relegation to 2. Liga
11	ZTS Dubnica (R)	30	9	7	14	25	35	−10	34	Relegation to 2. Liga
12	Humenné (R)	30	10	7	13	31	43	−12	37	Relegation to 2. Liga
13	Nitra (R)	30	8	4	18	24	44	−20	28	Relegation to 2. Liga
14	DAC Dunajská Streda (R)	30	6	9	15	24	42	−18	27	Relegation to 2. Liga
15	Dukla Banská Bystrica (R)	30	7	2	21	27	53	−26	23	Relegation to 2. Liga
16	Baník Prievidza (R)	30	6	4	20	29	71	−42	22	Relegation to 2. Liga

Source: RSSSF.org
Rules for classification: 1) points; 2) goal difference; 3) number of goals scored.
(C) Champions; (R) Relegated

== Results ==
Home \ Away	ART	BB	DUB	DAC	HUM	INT	KOŠ	NIT	PRE	PRI	RUŽ	SEN	SLO	TRE	TRN	ŽIL
Artmedia Petržalka		3–1	4–1	2–0	2–2	0–1	0–4	1–2	3–1	3–1	1–0	2–0	1–3	0–0	2–1	2–1
Dukla Banská Bystrica	1–2		0–1	1–2	1–1	0–2	2–1	1–2	1–2	1–0	0–1	1–0	0–1	1–0	1–2	3–2
ZTS Dubnica	0–0	1–0		0–0	5–0	0–1	2–0	5–0	1–0	0–1	0–0	0–1	0–3	0–0	1–0	1–4
DAC Dunajská Streda	1–1	2–2	1–2		4–0	0–0	0–2	1–0	1–2	5–1	1–0	2–2	0–3	0–0	0–0	0–1
Humenné	2–0	2–0	0–1	1–0		1–1	2–2	3–1	2–0	1–1	2–1	1–0	3–3	0–1	1–0	3–1
Inter Bratislava	1–0	3–0	3–0	1–0	6–0		2–1	3–0	2–0	7–0	2–3	2–0	1–1	1–1	0–0	2–0
1. FC Košice	3–2	3–1	2–1	2–1	1–0	3–1		3–1	3–0	3–2	2–1	2–1	0–2	4–0	0–0	2–0
Nitra	2–0	2–3	1–1	2–0	1–0	1–3	1–1		0–1	2–1	0–0	2–0	1–0	0–1	0–1	0–2
Prešov	3–0	3–0	1–0	1–1	1–0	0–3	2–1	2–0		4–1	1–1	1–0	1–1	2–1	1–0	1–1
Baník Prievidza	4–3	1–3	3–0	0–2	1–0	1–3	1–3	2–1	1–5		0–2	1–4	1–1	0–2	0–1	1–0
Ružomberok	2–2	1–0	1–0	1–0	1–1	1–1	0–2	3–0	1–0	1–1		1–0	1–0	3–1	1–0	2–0
Koba Senec	3–2	1–0	3–0	0–0	1–0	0–5	3–1	2–1	2–2	1–1	2–0		0–1	1–1	0–0	0–0
Slovan Bratislava	0–1	2–1	1–1	4–0	2–0	1–1	1–2	1–0	6–0	5–1	2–0	1–1		3–0	3–0	0–0
Ozeta Dukla Trenčín	2–0	5–2	2–0	2–0	4–1	1–3	0–0	1–1	2–0	2–0	2–0	2–2	1–0		1–2	3–0
Spartak Trnava	4–2	4–0	1–1	3–0	1–0	0–2	1–0	1–0	4–1	2–0	1–0	2–2	0–0	2–0		4–1
Žilina	2–2	1–0	2–0	6–0	0–2	1–2	1–4	1–0	2–0	4–0	2–0	2–1	0–1	1–0	1–1	

Source: RSSSF.org
Legend: Blue = home team win; Yellow = draw; Red = away team win.

== Season statistics ==
=== Top scorers ===
Rank	Player	Club	Goals
1	(Slovakia) Szilárd Németh	Inter Bratislava	16
2	(Ukraine) Ruslan Lyubarskyi	Košice	15
3	(Slovakia) Tomáš Medveď	Artmedia Petržalka	14
4	(Slovakia) Marek Mintál	Žilina	12
5	(Brazil) Luis Fabio Gomes	Spartak Trnava	10
5	(Slovakia) Stanislav Varga	Slovan Bratislava	10
7	(Slovakia) Jozef Kožlej	Košice	9
7	(Slovakia) Marián Ľalík	Inter Bratislava	9
7	(Slovakia) Július Šimon	Dunajská Streda/Artmedia Petržalka	9
7	(Slovakia) Jozef Urblík	Baník Prievidza	9

== See also ==
- 1999–2000 Slovak Cup
- 1999–2000 2. Liga (Slovakia)
