= Hloušek =

Hloušek (feminine: Hloušková) is a Czech surname. Notable people with the surname include:

- Adam Hloušek (born 1988), Czech footballer
- Martin Hloušek (born 1979), Slovak footballer
- Vítězslav Hloušek (1914–?), Czech basketball player
