= 1999–2000 2. Liga (Slovakia) =

2. liga
- Season: 1999–2000
- Champions: ŠK Matador Púchov
- Promoted: ŠK Matador Púchov
- Relegated: ZSNP Žiar nad Hronom; ŠK Slovan Bratislava B; FK Slovan Levice; AŠK Inter Bratislava B; ŠK Tesla Stropkov; FKM Nové Zámky; FK Slovan Duslo Šaľa; PFK Piešťany; FK Lokomotíva Košice; FK VTJ Spišská Nová Ves
- Matches: 306
- Goals: 805 (2.63 per match)

The 1999–2000 season of the Slovak Second Football League (also known as 2. liga) was the seventh season of the league since its establishment. It began on 31 July 1999 and ended on 11 June 2000.

== League standing ==
Pos	Team	Pld	W	D	L	GF	GA	GD	Pts	Promotion or relegation
1	ŠK Matador Púchov (C, P)	34	25	4	5	71	19	+52	79	Promotion to Mars superliga
2	NCHZ-DAK Nováky	34	24	5	5	67	19	+48	77	
3	Podbrezová	34	23	5	6	62	30	+32	74	
4	Steel Trans Ličartovce	34	17	10	7	69	39	+30	61	
5	Tauris Rimavská Sobota	34	18	6	10	65	41	+24	60	
6	BSC JAS Bardejov	34	17	6	11	48	32	+16	57	
7	Tatran ŠKP Devín	34	17	5	12	50	31	+19	56	
8	Slovenský hodváb Senica	34	15	8	11	61	55	+6	53	
9	ZSNP Žiar nad Hronom (R)	34	14	6	14	47	42	+5	48	Relegation to 3. Liga
10	Slovan Bratislava B (R)	34	15	3	16	38	43	−5	48	Relegation to 3. Liga
11	Slovan Levice (R)	34	15	3	16	34	43	−9	48	Relegation to 3. Liga
12	Inter Bratislava B (R)	34	10	10	14	39	43	−4	40	Relegation to 3. Liga
13	Tesla Stropkov (R)	34	10	9	15	31	45	−14	39	Relegation to 3. Liga
14	FKM Nové Zámky (R)	34	10	7	17	28	46	−18	37	Relegation to 3. Liga
15	Slovan Duslo Šaľa (R)	34	9	5	20	30	55	−25	32	Relegation to 3. Liga
16	PFK Piešťany (R)	34	9	4	21	29	62	−33	31	Relegation to 3. Liga
17	Lokomotíva Košice (R)	34	4	6	24	25	76	−51	18	Relegation to 3. Liga
18	VTJ Spišská Nová Ves (R)	34	1	4	29	12	85	−73	7	Relegation to 3. Liga

Source: RSSSF.org
Rules for classification: 1) points; 2) goal difference; 3) number of goals scored.
(C) Champions; (P) Promoted; (R) Relegated

== See also ==
- 1999–2000 Slovak Superliga
