= Ján Polgár =

Slovak footballer (1929–2023)

Personal information
- Date of birth: 31 May 1929
- Place of birth: Chop, Czechoslovakia
- Date of death: July 2023 (aged 94)
- Place of death: Košice, Slovakia
- Position: Forward

Senior career*
| Years | Team | Apps | (Gls) |
| 1948–1952 | Dynamo ČSD Košice | | (36) |
| 1953–1954 | Křídla vlasti Olomouc | | (6) |
| 1956 | Spartak Košice VSS | | (4) |
| 1957–1958 | Tatran Prešov | | (2) |
| 1958–1959 | Lokomotíva Košice | | |
- * Club domestic league appearances and goals

Ján Polgár (31 May 1929 – July 2023) was a Slovak professional footballer who played as a forward.

Polgár was born in the village of Chop, but grew up in Košice, where his family moved when he was only a few months old.

Over the course of his career, from 1948 to 1959, Polgár played over 300 professional games with various clubs, mainly in Košice but also played in Olomouc and Prešov and scored 48 goals.

Following the end of his active football career, Polgár worked as a youth coach for over 40 years.

Polgár was the first professional Slovak football player who celebrated his 90th birthday. He died in Košice in July 2023, at the age of 94.
