= Jozef Vengloš =

Slovak footballer and coach (1936–2021)

Personal information
- Date of birth: 18 February 1936
- Place of birth: Ružomberok, Czechoslovakia (now Slovakia)
- Date of death: 26 January 2021 (aged 84)
- Place of death: Bratislava, Slovakia
- Position: Midfielder

Senior career*
| Years | Team | Apps | (Gls) |
| 1954–1966 | Slovan Bratislava | | |
| 1959–1960 | Dukla Pardubice | | |

International career
| 1956–1959 | Czechoslovakia B | 6 | (0) |

Managerial career
- 1966: Sydney FC Prague
- 1966–1967: New South Wales
- 1967: Australia
- 1969–1971: VSS Košice
- 1970–1972: Czechoslovakia U23
- 1973–1976: Slovan Bratislava
- 1973–1978: Czechoslovakia (assistant)
- 1978–1982: Czechoslovakia
- 1983–1984: Sporting CP
- 1985–1987: Kuala Lumpur FA
- 1986–1987: Malaysia
- 1988–1990: Czechoslovakia
- 1990–1991: Aston Villa
- 1991–1993: Fenerbahçe
- 1993–1995: Slovakia
- 1996–1997: Oman
- 1998–1999: Celtic
- 2002: JEF United Ichihara
- * Club domestic league appearances and goals

Jozef Vengloš (18 February 1936 – 26 January 2021) was a Slovak professional football player and manager. As a player he made more than 200 appearances in the Czechoslovak First League and won the title with Slovan Bratislava in 1955.

After finishing his playing career he moved into football management, holding roles across the world. He led Czechoslovakia at two FIFA World Cups, as well as UEFA Euro 1980, where the side finished in third place. Among his club management roles, he became the first person born outside the British Isles to manage a top-flight English club side when he was appointed Aston Villa's manager in 1990. In 1993 he became the first head coach of Slovakia following their independence.

He held a doctorate in Physical Education and also specialised in Psychology. He was selected by FIFA on various occasions to lecture at the FIFA academies throughout the world.

== Playing career ==
Born in Ružomberok, Czechoslovakia (now in Slovakia), Vengloš played as a midfielder for Slovan Bratislava 1954–1966, and later captained the team, and also played for Czechoslovakia B. He scored 10 goals in 203 matches in the Czechoslovak First League, including some during a short spell at Dukla Pardubice. He was part of the title-winning Slovan Bratislava side for the 1955 Czechoslovak First League.

== Coaching career ==
After his playing career was prematurely ended by hepatitis, Vengloš began his managerial career in Australia, first in club football, before going on to manage the Australia national team. He then returned to Czechoslovakia and coached at club and Under-23 national level. In 1973, Vengloš was appointed as manager of Slovan Bratislava. During his three years in charge, he twice won the championship, including as part of a double in the 1973–74 season. He was also assistant manager of Czechoslovakia from 1973–1978. As assistant to Václav Ježek, he helped guide the team to victory in the Euro 1976, beating the Netherlands in the semi-finals and West Germany in the Final.

As manager of Czechoslovakia from 1978 to 1982, Vengloš led his side to 3rd place in the 1980 European Championship. He also led them to the 1982 World Cup Finals, where they went out in the first round.

He then coached Sporting Lisbon from 1983 to 1984, before coaching in Malaysia (Kuala Lumpur FA & Malaysia). In 1988, he was re-appointed to manage Czechoslovakia and took them to the quarter-finals of the 1990 World Cup.

Following the 1990 World Cup, Jozef Vengloš took over at Aston Villa, becoming the first manager born outside Britain or Ireland to take charge of a top division club in England. The Villa player, Dwight Yorke described Vengloš as quiet and introspective. He left after one season after they finished just two places above the First Division relegation zone.

He then moved to the Turkish league, where he managed Fenerbahçe from 1991 to 1993. He was the first manager of the Slovakia national team from 1993 to 1995, before managing Oman 1996–1997.

Vengloš was appointed as Head Coach of Celtic on 17 July 1998 following a prolonged search. Initial reaction from supporters was of anger, hundreds congregating outside the stadium and citing his doctorate by chanting "Dr Who?" Season 1998–99 saw his Celtic team in some excellent form, but they failed to qualify for the Champions League. At the end of the season, Vengloš left to take up a new position as a European technical adviser and as a scout for Celtic. He is most credited with signing fans' idol Ľubomír Moravčík during his season as manager. Other successful signings include club legend Johan Mjällby and while not winning a trophy, he is still looked upon fondly by fans for bringing such players to the club. The stand-out of his reign came as his Celtic side inflicted a punishing 5–1 defeat on arch-rivals Rangers in the first half of the season. In the new year of 1999, he also took Celtic to Ibrox where they held their Old Firm rivals to a 2–2 draw on their own soil.

He later managed Japanese side JEF United Ichihara (now JEF United Chiba) briefly in 2002.

== Other roles ==
Vengloš also served as president of the European Coaches Union, chairman of the UEFA Commission for Technical Progress, a technical adviser to FIFA, a member of the SFZ executive committee, and an adviser to the President of the Slovak Republic and the Minister of Education of the Slovak Republic.

He also ran for president of the Slovak Olympic Committee (SOV) in 1999, but lost out to František Chmelár.

== Honours ==
=== Player ===
Slovan Bratislava

- Czechoslovak First League: 1955
- Czechoslovak Cup: 1961–62, 1962–63

=== Manager ===
Sydney FC Prague

- Ampol Cup: 1969

Czechoslovakia U23

- UEFA U-23 Championship: 1972

Slovan Bratislava

- Czechoslovak First League: 1973–74, 1974–75
- Czechoslovak Cup: 1973–74
- Slovak Cup: 1973–74, 1975–76

Czechoslovakia

- UEFA European Championship third place: 1980

Kuala Lumpur City

- Malaysian First Division: 1986
- Malaysia Cup runner-up: 1985

Malaysia

- Merdeka Tournament: 1986

Fenerbahce

- Chancellor Cup runner-up 1992

Celtic

- Scottish Cup runner-up: 1998–99

Individual

- Slovak Olympic and Sports Committee (SOSV)
  - Chairman's Fair Play award (1993)
  - Bronze Rings award (2001)
  - Silver Rings award (2009)
  - Honorary member of SOSV (2011)
- CIFP Honorary Diploma of the UNESCO (1993)
- Laureate Crystal Wing award (2001)
- UEFA Diamond Order of Merit (2007)
- FIFA Centennial Order of Merit (2014)
- Slovak Football Hall of Fame (2017)

== Death ==
On 26 January 2021, Vengloš died at the age of 84.

== Cultural references ==
Vengloš is mentioned in the song "This One's for Now" by the band Half Man Half Biscuit on their 2014 album Urge for Offal.
