= Jozef Talian =

Slovak footballer

Personal information
- Full name: Jozef Talian
- Date of birth: 5 September 1985 (age 41)
- Place of birth: Bardejov, Czechoslovakia
- Height: 1.81 m (5 ft 11 in)
- Position: Goalkeeper

Team information
- Current team: Lokomotíva Košice
- Number: 22

Youth career
- Tatran Prešov

Senior career*
Years	Team	Apps	(Gls)
2004–2018	Tatran Prešov	119	(0)
2004–2005	→ Slovan Sabinov (loan)		
2010–2012	→ Odeva Lipany (loan)		
2012–2013	→ Šarišské Michaľany (loan)		
2018–2019	FK Kechnec		
2019	FC Jelka		
2019–	Lokomotíva Košice		

Managerial career
- 2019–: Lokomotíva Košice (player-assistant)
- * Club domestic league appearances and goals

Jozef Talian (born 5 September 1985 in Bardejov) is a Slovak football goalkeeper who currently plays for club FC Lokomotíva Košice.

== Career ==
He made his Corgoň Liga debut for 1. FC Tatran Prešov against MFK Dubnica.

Ahead of the 2019–20 season, Talian joined FC Lokomotíva Košice as a playing assistant manager.

== Honours ==
- Winner of 2007/2008 Slovak Second Football League with 1. FC Tatran Prešov.
