= Alexander Felszeghy =

Slovak footballer and coach

Personal information
- Full name: Alexander Felszeghy
- Date of birth: 28 October 1933
- Date of death: 20 December 1994 (aged 61)

International career
Years	Team	Apps	(Gls)
1955	Czechoslovakia	1	(0)

Alexander Felszeghy (28 October 1933 in Košice – 20 December 1994 in Košice) was a Slovak football defender or midfielder, and later coach. He started his professional career in Army team Tankista Prague (1954–1955) and kept on in Spartak Košice (1956), Tatran Prešov (1957–1960) and ended in Jednota/VSS Košice (1960–1966). Felszeghy overall made 141 appearances and scored three goals at the Czechoslovak First League.

On 13 November 1955, Felszeghy earned his only cap for the Czechoslovakia national football team in a 0–3 defeat against Bulgaria at Vasil Levski National Stadium.
