= FK Pardubice 1899 =

Czech football club, based in Pardubice

Pardubice 1899
- Full name: Fotbalový klub Pardubice 1899
- Founded: 1925
- Dissolved: 2017 (merged with Sokol Rosice nad Labem)
- Ground: Letní stadion, Pardubice

FK Pardubice 1899 was a Czech football club from the city of Pardubice, which played one season in the Czechoslovak First League, under the name of VCHZ Pardubice. It was founded as Explosia Semtín in 1925.

In 1961, then called "VCHZ Pardubice", the club merged with Dukla Pardubice (founded as "Tankista Praha", where International goalkeeper Imrich Stacho did his military service).

The club played in the 1968–69 Czechoslovak First League, reaching the final of the Czechoslovak Cup in the same season. The club played in the Czech 2. Liga between 1993 and 1997.

== Historical names ==
- 1925 – Explosia Semtín
- 1947 – Synthesia Semtín
- 1948 – Sokol Synthesia Semtín
- 1952 – Sokol Chemik Semtín
- 1953 – Jiskra Semtín
- 1958 – VCHZ Pardubice (1961 – merged with Dukla Pardubice (former "Tankista Praha")
- 1990 – Synthesia Pardubice
- 1993 – SK Pardubice
- 1997 – FK Dropa Pardubice 1899
- 1999 – FK Pardubice 1899
