= Jozef Štafura =

Slovak footballer

Personal information
- Full name: Jozef Štafura
- Date of birth: 11 September 1948 (age 78)
- Position: Midfielder

International career
Years	Team	Apps	(Gls)
1973	Czechoslovakia	1	(0)

Jozef Štafura (born 11 September 1948 in Pavlovce nad Uhom, Czechoslovakia) is a Slovak former footballer who played as a midfielder. He played for Strážske and for VSS Košice (1969–80). He played overall 251 games and scored 26 goals during his ten seasons at the Czechoslovak First League. He was a part of the legendary VSS midfield from the 1970s, including trio Štafura – Daňko – Pollák.

On 2 May 1973, Štafura made his only appearance for the Czechoslovakia national football team in a 1–1 away draw against Denmark at the 1974 FIFA World Cup qualification.

After his playing career he was an assistant coach of 1. FC Košice and the Slovakia national under-21 football team (1993–97) alongside Milan Lešický.
