= Ivan Čabala =

Slovak footballer (born 1960)

Personal information
- Date of birth: 13 February 1960 (age 66)
- Place of birth: Humenné, Czechoslovakia
- Height: 1.80 m (5 ft 11 in)
- Positions: Right-back; midfielder

Senior career*
Years	Team	Apps	(Gls)
1979–1982	Lokomotíva Košice	67	(2)
1982–1983	Dukla Prague	19	(3)
1983–1984	Rudá Hvězda Cheb	25	(0)
1984–1986	Lokomotíva Košice	54	(7)
1986–1990	Sparta Prague	101	(16)
1990	Västerås SK		
1991	Sparta Prague	13	(0)
1991–1993	Kremser SC		
1993–1994	Viktoria Žižkov	15	(0)

International career
1986–1989	Czechoslovakia	4	(0)
- * Club domestic league appearances and goals

Ivan Čabala (born 13 February 1960) is a Slovak former professional footballer who played as a right-back or midfielder.

Čabala started his career in Lokomotíva Košice. He later played for Sparta Prague, earning 222 appearances between 1986 and 1991. Outside the Czech Republic and Slovakia, Čabala later played for Swedish club Vasteras in 1990 and Austrian club Kremser SC from 1991 until 1993.

Čabala represented Czechoslovakia on four occasions between 1986 and 1989.
