= Milan Čvirk =

Slovak footballer

Personal information
- Date of birth: 14 September 1976
- Date of death: 2 December 1997 (aged 21)
- Place of death: Košice, Slovakia
- Position: Midfielder

Youth career
- 1. FC Košice

Senior career*
Years	Team	Apps	(Gls)
1994–1997	1. FC Košice	14	(0)
- * Club domestic league appearances and goals

Milan Čvirk (14 September 1976 – 2 December 1997) was a Slovak professional football player.

== Club career ==
He made his senior debut for 1. FC Košice in the 1994/95 season and went on to win the 1996–97 Slovak Superliga with them, qualifying for the 1997–98 UEFA Champions League.

== Death ==
Čvirk died on 2 December 1997 in a car crash, in which his teammate Albert Rusnák suffered fractures to both legs. It was reported that the vehicle had slipped in bad weather conditions and hit a street light, instantly killing the young midfielder. The crash also ended the playing career of Rusnák, who was driving the car.

When Košice played Feyenoord in the Champions League a week later, Čvirk's shirt was held up during the taking of the squad's photo. Also, Feyenoord's players wore black armbands during the match in memory of Čvirk.
