= Srđan Pecelj =

Bosnian former footballer

Personal information
- Full name: Srđan Pecelj
- Date of birth: 12 March 1975 (age 51)
- Place of birth: Mostar, SFR Yugoslavia
- Height: 1.82 m (6 ft 0 in)
- Position: Centre back

Youth career
- Velež Mostar

Senior career*
Years	Team	Apps	(Gls)
1991–1992	Velež Mostar		
1992–1993	Red Star Belgrade	0	(0)
1993–1994	Železnik		
1995–1996	Red Star Belgrade	13	(1)
1996–1997	Barcelona B	9	(0)
1997–1999	Red Star Belgrade	28	(0)
1999–2000	Čukarički	26	(1)
2000–2001	Paniliakos	8	(0)
2001	Sokol Saratov	9	(0)
2002	Shimizu S-Pulse	7	(2)
2003–2005	Inter Zaprešić	58	(5)
2005–2007	Admira Wacker	52	(4)
2008	Schwadorf 1936		
2008–2010	Inter Zaprešić	29	(0)
2010–2011	Novalja	13	(0)
2011–2012	Rudar Trbovlje		

International career
1997	FR Yugoslavia U21	2	(0)
2001	Bosnia and Herzegovina	5	(0)
- * Club domestic league appearances and goals

Srđan Pecelj (born 12 March 1975) is a Bosnian retired footballer who played as a defender.

== Club career ==
He started his career playing in the youth teams of Velež Mostar for which he played in the senior squad in the season 1991–92. Then he moved to Serbia to play for Red Star Belgrade. But, after not getting much play, he moved, next season, to another Belgrade club, Železnik. In 1994, Srđan made a big move, this time to Barcelona, but he only managed to stay in the B squad, for the next two years, due to heavy competition in the team. Then, he came back to Serbia where he first played one season in the newly promoted Čukarički, also a Belgrade club, and then returned to Red Star where he played two seasons, until 1999. That summer, he moved to Greece to play in the next two years in Paniliakos. In 2001, he played one season in Russian club Sokol Saratov. Then he moved to Japan and played for Shimizu S-Pulse in the J1 League and in the Austrian Bundesliga in Admira Wacker. The second half of the 2007–08 season he spent with SK Schwadorf 1936. Since summer 2008, he played in Croatia in Inter Zaprešić, one of the good sides in the Prva HNL League. After two seasons he moved to NK Novalja where he played the 2010–11 season.

== International career ==
In 1997 he made 2 appearances for the FR Yugoslav U21 team.

He has played 5 matches for Bosnia and Herzegovina national football team, all of them part of the Merdeka Cup in Malaysia in June 2001.

== Personal life ==
His brother Miljan is also a footballer.
