= Bohumil Andrejko =

Slovak football coach and former striker

Personal information
- Date of birth: 10 February 1953 (age 73)
- Position: Striker

Senior career*
Years	Team	Apps	(Gls)
1972–1981	VSS Košice		
1984–1986	Lokomotíva Košice		
Total		201	(55)
- * Club domestic league appearances and goals

Bohumil Andrejko (born 10 February 1953) is a Slovak football coach and former striker. He played for VSS Košice (1972–81), Lokomotíva Košice (1984–86) and he made 201 appearances and scored 55 goals at the Czechoslovak First League.

Andrejko played overall 16 games and scored 2 goals for the Czechoslovakia national under-16, under-18 and under-23 team but never played for the first team.

He was an assistant coach of the Slovakia U-21 team from 1997 to 2000. He went to the 2000 UEFA European Under-21 Football Championship and the 2000 Summer Olympics alongside Dušan Radolský. He was also a head coach of 1. FC Košice and the Slovakia U-19 team.
