= Ján Zachar =

Slovak footballer and coach

Personal information
- Date of birth: 1 December 1936 (age 89)

Managerial career
- Years: Team
- –: VP Frýdek-Místek
- 1981–1982: Tatran Prešov
- 1984–1985: 1. FC Brno
- 1985–1986: Sparta Prague
- 1986–1988: Slovan Bratislava
- 1993: 1. FC Košice
- 1994: 1. FC Košice
- 1995–1996: Baník Ostrava
- 1999: 1. FC Košice

Ján Zachar (born 1 December 1936) is a Slovak football coach and former player. He coached among others ŠK Slovan Bratislava and MFK Košice.

He coached VP Frýdek-Místek, Tatran Prešov, 1. FC Brno, Sparta Prague, Slovan Bratislava and Baník Ostrava.
