= Ján Strausz =

Slovak footballer

Personal information
- Full name: Ján Strausz
- Date of birth: 16 November 1942
- Place of birth: Munkács, Hungary (now Ukraine)
- Date of death: 29 November 2017 (aged 75)
- Place of death: Košice, Slovakia
- Position: Forward

International career
Years	Team	Apps	(Gls)
1965	Czechoslovakia	1	(0)

Ján Strausz (16 November 1942 – 29 November 2017), nicknamed Johan after composer Johann Strauss, was a Slovak football striker who played for Jednota Košice, Dukla Prague (1965–1966), VSS Košice (1963–1965 and 1967–1975), Baník Rožňava, Tatran Prešov and Družstevník Čaňa within years 1960–1979. He overall played 261 matches and scored 115 goals in the Czechoslovak First League.

Strausz was capped once for the Czechoslovakia national football team against Romania on 30 May 1965.
