= František Hoholko =

Slovak footballer and coach

Personal information
- Full name: František Hoholko
- Date of birth: 1 May 1947
- Place of birth: Czechoslovakia
- Date of death: 9 February 2005 (aged 57)
- Place of death: Čaňa, Slovakia
- Positions: Winger; striker

Senior career*
Years	Team	Apps	(Gls)
1965–1979	VSS Košice	228	(44)
Total		228	(44)

International career
1970	Czechoslovakia	1	(0)
- * Club domestic league appearances and goals

František Hoholko (1 May 1947 – 9 February 2005) was a former Slovak football winger or striker and later coach. During his playing career he made 228 appearances and scored 44 goals at the Czechoslovak First League. Hoholko was the top VSS scorer in the 1970–71 season, scoring 13 goals.

On 7 October 1970, Hoholko played his only match for the Czechoslovakia national football team against Finland (1–1, Letná Stadium) at the UEFA Euro 1972 qualifying.

He acted as head coach at the Slovak Second League team FK Čaňa before his death in 2005.
