= Albert Rusnák (footballer, born 1974) =

Slovak footballer and manager

Personal information
- Full name: Albert Rusnák
- Date of birth: 14 January 1974 (age 52)
- Place of birth: Prešov, Czechoslovakia
- Position: Striker

Team information
- Current team: Dunajská Streda (assistant)

Youth career
- Prešov

Senior career*
Years	Team	Apps	(Gls)
1992–1993	Prešov	37	(6)
1994–1996	Petra Drnovice	62	(7)
1996–1998	Košice	39	(8)
Total		138	(21)

International career
- Slovakia U21

Managerial career
- Bardejovská Nová Ves
- Krásna
- Košice (youth)
- 2011–2012: Michalovce (U19)
- 2012–2013: Michalovce
- 2016–2018: Lokomotíva Košice
- 2018–2025: Slovakia U19
- 2025: ŠTK 1914 Šamorín
- 2026: Dunajská Streda (assistant)
- * Club domestic league appearances and goals

Albert Rusnák (born 14 January 1974) is a Slovak professional football manager and former player who is currently the assistant manager of Dunajská Streda. His son is Albert Rusnák, who currently plays for American Major League Soccer club Seattle Sounders FC.

As a footballer, Rusnák was a member of the Košice side which won the Slovak league title in 1997 and retained it a year later. However, he suffered fractures to both legs in a car crash on 2 December 1997 which claimed the life of Košice midfielder Milan Čvirk. Shortly before the crash, Rusnák played in some of Košice's UEFA Champions League fixtures during the 1997–98 season, including the group stage clash with Manchester United at Old Trafford.
