= Jozef Desiatnik =

Slovak footballer and coach

Personal information
- Full name: Jozef Desiatnik
- Date of birth: 11 March 1944
- Place of birth: Miková, Slovak Republic
- Date of death: 3 September 2004 (aged 60)
- Place of death: Košice, Slovakia
- Positions: Defender; midfielder

Youth career
- VSS Košice

Senior career*
Years	Team	Apps	(Gls)
1965–1972	VSS Košice	180	(10)
1972–?	VSŽ Košice		

International career
1970–1971	Czechoslovakia	5	(0)
- * Club domestic league appearances and goals

Jozef Desiatnik (11 March 1944 – 3 September 2004) was a former Slovak football defender or midfielder and later coach. He played for VSS Košice from 1965 to 1972 and he finished his career in VSŽ Košice. During his seven seasons at the Czechoslovak First League he played 180 matches and scored 10 goals.

Desiatnik was capped 5 times for the Czechoslovakia national football team and made his debut against Finland on 7 October 1970.
