= Ondrej Daňko =

Slovak footballer

Personal information
- Full name: Ondrej Daňko
- Date of birth: 26 May 1948 (age 78)
- Position: Midfielder

International career
Years	Team	Apps	(Gls)
1971–1972	Czechoslovakia	2	(0)

Ondrej Daňko (born 26 May 1948 in Czechoslovakia) is a Slovak former footballer who played as a midfielder. He spent his whole career with VSS Košice, where he played between 1967 and 1981. Daňko played overall 313 matches and scored 56 goals at the Czechoslovak First League. He was a part of the legendary VSS midfield from the 1970s, including trio Štafura – Daňko – Pollák.

He won Slovak Cup in 1973 and 1980.

Daňko made two appearances for the Czechoslovakia national football team.
