= Milan Pecelj =

Serbian footballer (born 1979)

Miljan Pecelj
Personal information
- Date of birth: 13 April 1979 (age 47)
- Place of birth: Mostar, SFR Yugoslavia
- Height: 1.90 m (6 ft 3 in)
- Position: Forward

Youth career
- Velež Mostar
- Red Star Belgrade

Senior career*
Years	Team	Apps	(Gls)
1995–1997	Lokomotíva Košice	13	(4)
1997–1998	Austria Wien	0	(0)
1998	Galatasaray	0	(0)
1999–2000	Radnički Niš	1+	(0+)
2000–2001	Hajduk Kula	1	(0)
2001–2002	AEL Limassol	0	(0)
2002–2003	Brotnjo		
2003–2004	Zrinjski Mostar	2	(0)
2004–2005	Leotar	12	(2)
2005–2006	Inter Zaprešić	7	(0)
2006–2007	Leotar	17	(4)
2007–2008	Sloboda Tuzla	8	(1)
- * Club domestic league appearances and goals

Miljan Pecelj (Serbian Cyrillic: Миљан Пецељ; born 13 April 1979) is a Serbian former professional footballer who played as a forward.

== Club career ==
Born in Mostar, SR Bosnia and Herzegovina, his football career started in the youth squad of his home town club Velež Mostar. Next, he moved to Belgrade, in Serbia to play in the youth squad of the 1992 European and World Champions Red Star Belgrade. In 1995, he moved to Slovakia to be one of the first foreigners in Lokomotíva Košice, where he stayed two seasons. Then, he moved to Austrian Bundesliga club Austria Wien, but next summer he moved to Turkey to play in the great Galatasaray. After only half a season, in January 1999, he was back to Serbia, this time, to play in Radnički Niš, and next in Hajduk Kula. In summer 2001, he moved to Cyprus club AEL Limassol, where he stayed one season. Since 2002, he was back to Bosnia to play in a number of clubs: HNK Brotnjo, his home town HŠK Zrinjski, FK Leotar from Trebinje (twice), and Sloboda Tuzla, his last club. In between, he had a spell in Croatia in Prva HNL club Inter Zaprešić, in the season 2005–06.

== Personal life ==
His brother Srđan is also a footballer.

== Honours ==
Galatasaray

- Turkish Super League: 1998–99
- Turkish Cup: 1999
