= Ladislav Tamáš =

Slovak footballer

Ladislav Tamáš (born 12 August 1953) is a former Slovak football defender who played during his career only for VSS/ZŤS Košice (1972–1981) and he overall played 191 matches and scored one goal at the Czechoslovak First League.

Tamáš made two appearances for the Czechoslovakia national under-21 football team in 1974.
