= Anton Švajlen =

Slovak footballer (1937–2026)

Personal information
- Date of birth: 3 December 1937
- Place of birth: Solčany, Czechoslovakia
- Date of death: 17 May 2026 (aged 88)
- Height: 1.84 m (6 ft 0 in)
- Position: Goalkeeper

Senior career*
Years	Team	Apps	(Gls)
1959–1974	VSS Košice	319	(11)

International career
1960–1966	Czechoslovakia B	3	(1)
1964–1968	Czechoslovakia Olympic	5	(0)
Medal record
Men's football
Representing Czechoslovakia
Olympic Games
Silver medal – second place	1964 Tokyo	Team competition
- * Club domestic league appearances and goals

Anton Švajlen (3 December 1937 – 17 May 2026) was a Slovak footballer who played as a goalkeeper, making over 300 appearances in the Czechoslovak First League for VSS Košice between 1959 and 1975. He competed for Czechoslovakia at the 1964 Summer Olympics in Tokyo where he won a silver medal in the team competition. Švajlen played five matches for the Czechoslovakia Olympic Team (one at the 1964 Olympics) and three matches for the Czechoslovakia national football B team, but he never played for the first team.

During his 14 seasons at the Czechoslovak First League he made 336 appearances (214 without substitution). Švajlen was also known as penalty taker. He scored 11 league goals during his club career, all penalties, including five in the 1964–65 Czechoslovak First League. He additionally scored a penalty in a UEFA Cup match against Spartak Moscow in a 2–1 Košice win, although the aggregate score of 2–3 resulted in Spartak progressing in the tournament.

Švajlen died on 17 May 2026, at the age of 88.
