= Solčany =

Solčany Szolcsány
- Municipality
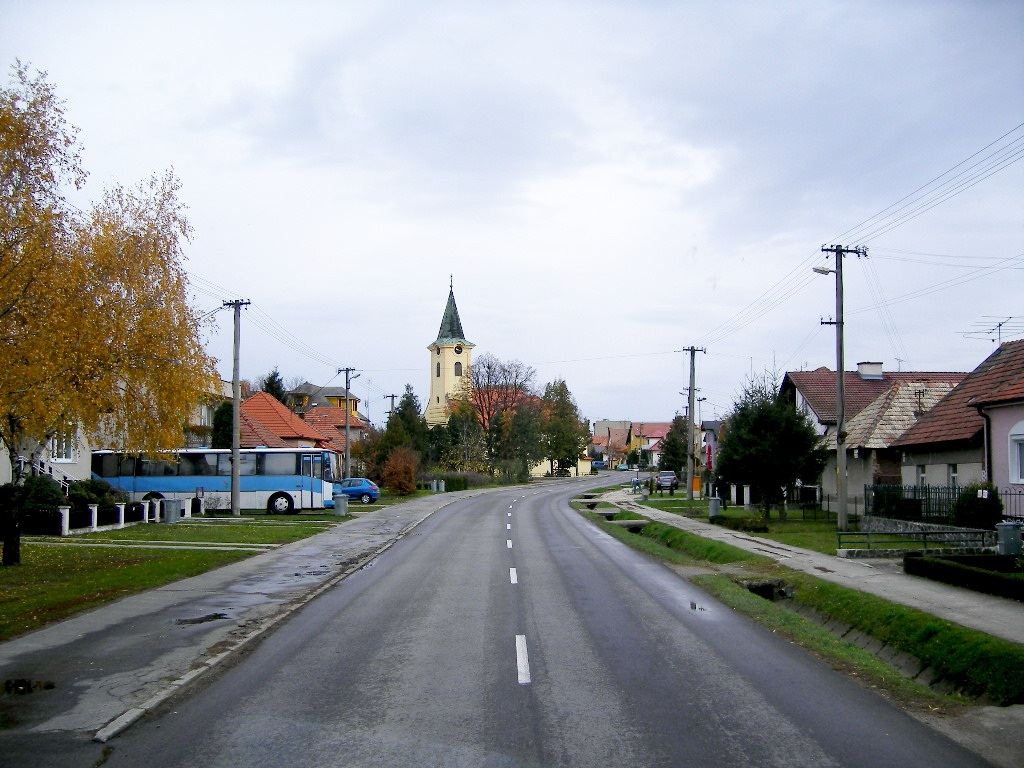

- Flag

- Location of Solčany in the Nitra Region Location of Solčany in Slovakia
- Coordinates: 48.53°N 17.90°E
- Country: Slovakia
- Region: Nitra Region
- District: Topoľčany District
- First mentioned: 1113

Area
  - Total: 20.01 km^{2} (7.73 sq mi)
- Elevation: 175 m (574 ft)

Population (2025)
  - Total: 2,450
- Time zone: UTC+1 (CET)
  - Summer (DST): UTC+2 (CEST)
- Postal code: 956 17
- Area code: +421 38
- Vehicle registration plate (until 2022): TO
- Website: www.obecsolcany.sk

Solčany (Hungarian: Szolcsány) is a municipality in the Topoľčany District of the Nitra Region, Slovakia. Solčany Village is the center of the municipality. In 2011 it had 2467 inhabitants. It has good shopping networks, small health centers, sport clubs and sport facilities. Solčany is also the birthplace of known footballers, Anton Ondruš and Anton Švajlen.

== Geography ==
The municipality lies at an altitude of 175 metres (574 ft) and covers an area of 20.01 km^{2} (7.73 sq mi) (2025).

== Population ==
Population statistic (10 years)
Year	1995	2005	2015	2025
Count	2322	2513	2458	2450
Difference		+8.22%	−2.18%	−0.32%

Population statistic
Year	2024	2025
Count	2475	2450
Difference		−1.01%

It has a population of 2450 people (31 December 2025).

=== Ethnicity ===
Census 2021 (1+ %)
Ethnicity	Number	Fraction
Slovak	2479	97.1%
Not found out	62	2.42%
Total	2553	

In year 2021 was 2553 people by ethnicity 2479 as Slovak, 62 as Not found out, 8 as Romanian, 6 as Russian, 4 as Czech, 4 as Hungarian, 4 as Other, 2 as Austrian, 2 as German, 1 as Irish, 1 as Serbian, 1 as Polish, 1 as Moravian and 1 as Canadian.

Note on population: The difference values of population numbers in the table "Population statistic" and in the sections "Ethnicity" & "Religion" is caused by the use of various statistical methods.

=== Religion ===
Census 2021 (1+ %)
Religion	Number	Fraction
Roman Catholic Church	2088	81.79%
None	310	12.14%
Not found out	81	3.17%
Evangelical Church	32	1.25%
Total	2553	

In year 2021 was 2553 people by religion 2088 from Roman Catholic Church, 310 from None, 81 from Not found out, 32 from Evangelical Church, 11 from Greek Catholic Church, 8 from Ad hoc movements, 6 from Other, 5 from Paganism and natural spirituality, 3 from Eastern Orthodox Church, 2 from Other and not ascertained christian church, 2 from Buddhism, 1 from Jehovah's Witnesses, 1 from Christian Congregations in Slovakia, 1 from Islam, 1 from Seventh-day Adventist Church and 1 from Apostolic Church.

== Notable people ==
- Anton Ondruš, footballer
- Anton Švajlen, footballer
