= Radoslav Kráľ =

Slovak footballer

Personal information
- Date of birth: 20 February 1974 (age 52)
- Place of birth: Žilina, Czechoslovakia
- Height: 1.82 m (6 ft 0 in)
- Position: Defender

Senior career*
Years	Team	Apps	(Gls)
1993–1995	Žilina	49	(4)
1995–2002	1.FC Košice	138	(17)
1997	→ Petrimex Prievidza (loan)	14	(0)
2002–2004	Zalaegerszegi	52	(0)
2004–2005	Ružomberok	14	(0)
2005–2006	Košice	23	(3)
2006–2007	Viktoria Žižkov	27	(0)
2007–2008	Polonia Bytom	12	(0)
2009	Dolný Kubín		
2010–2013	Calcio Leinfelden-Echterdingen		

International career
2000	Slovakia Olympic	2	(0)
2001	Slovakia	1	(0)
- * Club domestic league appearances and goals

Radoslav Kráľ (born 20 February 1974) is a Slovak former professional footballer who played as a defender. He competed in the men's tournament at the 2000 Summer Olympics.
