= Martin Hloušek =

Slovak footballer

Personal information
- Full name: Martin Hloušek
- Date of birth: 2 October 1979 (age 47)
- Place of birth: Košice, Czechoslovakia
- Height: 1.77 m (5 ft 10 in)
- Position: Midfielder

Senior career*
| Years | Team | Apps | (Gls) |
| 1999–2002 | Košice | | |
| 2002 | SOYUZ-Gazprom Izhevsk | 9 | (0) |
| 2003–2004 | Ružomberok | | |
| 2004–2005 | Rimavská Sobota | 34 | (2) |
| 2005–2006 | Púchov | 20 | (1) |
| 2006–2007 | Rimavská Sobota | | |
| 2007–2008 | Marila Příbram | 18 | (1) |
| 2008–2009 | 1. FK Příbram | 2 | (0) |
| 2009 | LAFC Lučenec | | |
| 2010 | Sandecja Nowy Sącz | 19 | (1) |
| 2011 | Wisła Płock | 0 | (0) |
| 2011 | Poprad Muszyna | 13 | (2) |
| 2011 | LAFC Lučenec | 14 | (0) |
| 2012–2017 | Lokomotíva Košice | | |
- * Club domestic league appearances and goals

Martin Hloušek (born 2 October 1979) is a Slovak former professional footballer who played as a midfielder.

== Career ==
=== Club ===
In January 2011, he joined Wisła Płock.
