= Tibor Zátek =

Slovak footballer

Personal information
- Date of birth: 14 June 1971 (age 55)
- Place of birth: Čadca, Czechoslovakia
- Height: 1.86 m (6 ft 1 in)
- Position: Defender

Youth career
- 1984–1990: Dukla Banská Bystrica

Senior career*
Years	Team	Apps	(Gls)
1990–1993	Dukla Banská Bystrica	32	(0)
1993–1994	SSV Jahn Regensburg		
1994–1997	Dukla Banská Bystrica	101	(1)
1997–1999	Baník Ostrava	27	(1)
1999–2000	1. FC Košice	45	(0)
2000–2002	MFK Ružomberok	41	(2)
2002–2005	SV Mattersburg	66	(4)
2005	MFK Ružomberok		
2007–2008	SV Loipersbach		
2008–2009	ASK Kobersdorf		

International career
1997–2000	Slovakia	14	(0)
- * Club domestic league appearances and goals

Tibor Zátek (born 14 June 1971) is a former Slovak football player.

Zátek played for Dukla Banská Bystrica before moving to Czech Baník Ostrava in 1997. In 1999, he moved to 1. FC Košice in Slovakia. After playing another two seasons at MFK Ružomberok, Zátek moved to Austria, where he played for several division clubs.
