= Ladislav Józsa =

Personal information
- Full name: Ladislav Józsa
- Date of birth: 16 January 1948
- Place of birth: Csávoly, Hungary
- Date of death: 12 December 1999 (aged 51)
- Place of death: Sládkovičovo, Slovakia
- Height: 1.94 m (6 ft 4 in)
- Position: Striker

Youth career
- Slavoj Sládkovičovo

Senior career*
Years	Team	Apps	(Gls)
- Dukla Dejvice
- Spartak Komárno
- Lokomotíva Spiš. N. Ves
1971–1979	Lokomotíva Košice		
1979	Jednota Trenčín		
1979–1980	DAC Dunajská Streda		

International career
1977	Czechoslovakia	1	(0)
- * Club domestic league appearances and goals

Ladislav Józsa (16 January 1948 – 12 December 1999) was a professional footballer who played as a striker. His family moved from Hungary, where he was born, to Sládkovičovo. He was known as free kick specialist for his hard shots. He became the top scorer of the Czechoslovak First League three times, scoring 21 goals at 1972–73, 17 goals at 1973–74 and 18 goals at 1976–77 season. He overall played 225 matches and scored 108 goals at the Top Division.

Józsa made his only appearance for the Czechoslovakia national football team in a 1–0 home win against Turkey on 7 September 1977.

== Honours ==
- Czechoslovak Cup

- 1977, 1979

- Top goalscorer of the Czechoslovak First League

- 1972–73, 1973–74, 1976–77
