= Czechoslovak Cup =

Football competition in Czechoslovakia

The Czechoslovak Cup (Czech: Československý pohár) was a football cup competition held in Czechoslovakia. It was officially created in 1960 in order to select a representative for the newly created UEFA Cup Winners' Cup, although not in time for the first edition, for which Czechoslovakia sent 1959–60 Spartakiádní pohár winners Rudá Hvězda Brno. The competition folded in 1993 with the split between Czech Republic and Slovakia.

The cup was played throughout Czechoslovakia until 1968–69. From the 1969–70 season to the 1992–93 season, due to the country's federalization in 1969, the cup was played between the winners of Czech Cup (Český pohár) and Slovak Cup (Slovenský pohár), which were thus the semi-finals of the Czechoslovak Cup. The modern Czech Cup and Slovak Cup are the successors of the Czechoslovak Cup.

Sparta Prague and Dukla Prague were the most successful clubs winning both 8 times. In total, Czech teams lifted the Cup 20 times, and Slovak teams 13 times.

The origins of the cup are in unofficial tournaments played in 1950–51, 1951–52, 1955 and 1959–60 season.

== Finals ==
Year	Winner	Date	Stadium	Final	Score
1960–61	Dukla Prague (Č)	3.12.1961	Stadion míru, Olomouc	Dukla Prague – Dynamo Žilina	3–0
1961–62	Slovan Bratislava (S)	2.12.1962	Gottwaldov	Dukla Prague – Slovan Bratislava	1–1
1961–62	Slovan Bratislava (S)	17.7.1963	Stadion Jana Švermy, Brno	Slovan Bratislava – Dukla Prague	4–1
1962–63	Slovan Bratislava (S)	24.7.1963	Stadion primátora Vacka, Prague	Dynamo Prague – Slovan Bratislava	0–0
1962–63	Slovan Bratislava (S)	31.7.1963	Tehelné Pole, Bratislava	Slovan Bratislava – Dynamo Prague	9–0
1963–64	Spartak Prague Sokolovo (Č)	20.5.1964	Stadion Jana Švermy, Brno	Spartak Prague Sokolovo – VSS Košice	4–1
1964–65	Dukla Prague (Č)	27.6.1965	Letná Stadium, Prague	Dukla Prague – Slovan Bratislava	0–0; 5–3 p.k.
1965–66	Dukla Prague (Č)	4.5.1966	Prešov	Tatran Prešov – Dukla Prague	1–2
1965–66	Dukla Prague (Č)	1.6.1966	Stadion Juliska, Prague	Dukla Prague – Tatran Prešov	4–0
1966–67	Spartak Trnava (S)	21.6.1967	Stadion primátora Vacka, Prague	Sparta Prague – Spartak Trnava	4–2
1966–67	Spartak Trnava (S)	28.6.1967	Trnava	Spartak Trnava – Sparta Prague	2–0
1967–68	Slovan Bratislava (S)	5.6.1968	Stadion Juliska, Prague	Dukla Prague – Slovan Bratislava	1–0
1967–68	Slovan Bratislava (S)	26.6.1968	Tehelné Pole, Bratislava	Slovan Bratislava – Dukla Prague	2–0
1968–69	Dukla Prague (Č)	18.6.1969	Pardubice	VCHZ Pardubice – Dukla Prague	1–1
1968–69	Dukla Prague (Č)	23.6.1969	Stadion Juliska, Prague	Dukla Prague – VCHZ Pardubice	1–0
1969–70	TJ Gottwaldov (Č)	29.7.1970	Tehelné Pole, Bratislava	Slovan Bratislava - TJ Gottwaldov	3–3
1969–70	TJ Gottwaldov (Č)	2.8.1970	Gottwaldov	TJ Gottwaldov – Slovan Bratislava	0–0; 4–3 p.k.
1970–71	Spartak Trnava (S)	27.6.1971	Štruncovy sady, Plzeň	Škoda Plzeň – Spartak Trnava	1–2
1970–71	Spartak Trnava (S)	30.6.1971	Trnava (S)	Spartak Trnava – Škoda Plzeň	5–1
1971–72	Sparta Prague (Č)	1.8.1972	Tehelné Pole, Bratislava	Slovan Bratislava – Sparta Prague	1–0
1971–72	Sparta Prague (Č)	5.8.1972	Letná Stadium, Prague	Sparta Prague – Slovan Bratislava	4–3 a.e.t. 4–3 p.k.
1972–73	Baník Ostrava (Č)	9.5.1973	Košice	VSS Košice – Baník Ostrava	2–1
1972–73	Baník Ostrava (Č)	30.5.1973	Bazaly, Ostrava	Baník Ostrava – VSS Košice	3–1
1973–74	Slovan Bratislava (S)	21.6.1974	Stadion primátora Vacka, Prague	Slavia Prague – Slovan Bratislava	1–0
1973–74	Slovan Bratislava (S)	25.6.1974	Tehelné Pole, Bratislava	Slovan Bratislava – Slavia Prague	1–0 a.e.t. 4–3 p.k.
1974–75	Spartak Trnava (S)	2.6.1975	Trnava	Spartak Trnava – Sparta Prague	3–1
1974–75	Spartak Trnava (S)	18.6.1975	Letná Stadium, Prague	Sparta Prague – Spartak Trnava	0–1
1975–76	Sparta Prague (Č)	24.6.1976	Letná Stadium, Prague	Sparta Prague – Slovan Bratislava	3–2
1975–76	Sparta Prague (Č)	27.6.1976	Tehelné Pole, Bratislava	Slovan Bratislava – Sparta Prague	0–1
1976–77	Lokomotíva Košice (S)	9.5.1977	Letná Stadium, Prague	Lokomotíva Košice – Sklo Union Teplice	2–1
1977–78	Baník Ostrava (Č)	9.5.1978	Tehelné Pole, Bratislava	Baník Ostrava – Jednota Trenčín	1–0
1978–79	Lokomotíva Košice (S)	9.5.1979	Letná Stadium, Prague	Lokomotíva Košice – Baník Ostrava	2–1
1979–80	Sparta Prague (Č)	7.5.1980	Tehelné Pole, Bratislava	Sparta Prague – ZŤS Košice	2–0
1980–81	Dukla Prague (Č)	6.5.1981	Letná Stadium, Prague	Dukla Prague – Dukla Banská Bystrica	0–0 a.e.t. 4–2 p.k.
1981–82	Slovan Bratislava (S)	8.5.1982	Tehelné Pole, Bratislava	Slovan Bratislava – Bohemians Prague	4–1
1982–83	Dukla Prague (Č)	15.6.1983	Stadion Evžena Rošického, Prague	Dukla Prague – Slovan Bratislava	2–1
1983–84	Sparta Prague (Č)	24.5.1984	Tehelné Pole, Bratislava	Sparta Prague – Inter Bratislava	4–2
1984–85	Dukla Prague (Č)	23.6.1985	Stadion Na Litavce, Příbram	Dukla Prague – Lokomotíva Košice	3–2
1985–86	Spartak Trnava (S)	22.6.1986	Jelšava	Spartak Trnava – Sparta Prague	1–1 a.e.t. 4–3 p.k.
1986–87	DAC Dunajská Streda (S)	21.6.1987	Kopřivnice	DAC Dunajská Streda – Sparta Prague	0–0 a.e.t. 3–2 p.k.
1987–88	Sparta Prague (Č)	19.6.1988	Ružomberok	Sparta Prague – Inter Bratislava	2–0
1988–89	Sparta Prague (Č)	18.6.1989	Stadion Ostroj Opava, Opava	Sparta Prague – Slovan Bratislava	3–0
1989–90	Dukla Prague (Č)	13.5.1990	Prešov	Dukla Prague – Inter Bratislava	1–1 a.e.t. 5–4 p.k.
1990–91	Baník Ostrava (Č)	22.5.1991	Frýdek-Místek	Baník Ostrava – Spartak Trnava	6–1
1991–92	Sparta Prague (Č)	7.6.1992	Trebišov	Sparta Prague – Tatran Prešov	2–1
1992–93	1. FC Košice (S)	6.6.1993	Poštorná	1. FC Košice – Sparta Prague	5–1

== Winners ==
- Dukla Prague 8
- Sparta Prague 8 (including as Spartak Sokolovo)
- Slovan Bratislava 5
- Spartak Trnava 4
- Baník Ostrava 3
- Lokomotíva Košice 2
- DAC Dunajská Streda 1
- 1. FC Košice 1
- FC Tescoma Zlín 1 (as TJ Gottwaldov)

== Venues of final matches ==
(Does not include matches when the home-away system was played)

Venue	Nr. of final matches	Year
Prague	4	1977, 1979, 1981, 1983
Bratislava	4	1978, 1980, 1982, 1984
Olomouc	1	1961
Příbram	1	1985
Jelšava	1	1986
Kopřivnice	1	1987
Ružomberok	1	1988
Opava	1	1989
Prešov	1	1990
Frýdek-Místek	1	1991
Trebišov	1	1992
Poštorná	1	1993

== See also ==
- Czechoslovak First League
- Czech Cup
- Slovak Cup
- Czech-Slovak Supercup, de facto revival as a friendly between the Czech and Slovak cup winners post-dissolution
