= FC VSS Košice =

- Full name: Football Club VSS Košice
- Nicknames: žlto-modrí (yellow-blue); VSS
- Founded: 1903; 123 years ago as Kassai AC
- Dissolved: 27 July 2017; 9 years ago
- Ground: Lokomotíva Stadium, Košice
- Capacity: 9,000
- Chairman: Blažej Podolák
- Manager: Jozef Majoroš
- 2016–17: 2. Liga, 1st
- Website: https://www.fckosice.sk/
Home colours	Away colours

FC VSS Košice, formerly 1. FC Košice, was a Slovak football club based in Košice which played in the Slovak 2. Liga during the 2016–17 season. The club officially ceased operations on 27 July 2017.

The club, founded in 1903, won the Slovak League twice, the Slovak Cup five times and the Czechoslovak Cup once. The most successful eras of the club were in the 1970s and 1990s which they spent mostly in the top tier of Czechoslovak and Slovak Football. Two of the UEFA Euro 1976 champions namely Dušan Galis and Jaroslav Pollák played for Košice.

== History ==
=== Early history ===
The club was founded in 1903 as Kassai AC (Slovak: Košický Atletický Klub; Hungarian: Kassai Atlétikai Club). The club's colours were blue and yellow. In the 1910s, the club competed in the Hungarian championship. In 1909 it won the Nemzeti Bajnokság II Championship. Later they played in eastern group in Slovak-Subcarpathian division between 1935 and 1938. In 1939–40 the club played in Hungarian League I. Among the most successful Kassai AC players were Szaniszló, Šiňovský, the Drotár brothers, Klein, Lebenský, Dráb, and Pásztor. For many years, the club was based at the stadium on Sokoljevova Street with a capacity of 16,000 spectators. The stadium was often full. After the end of World War II, the city's three clubs Kassai AC, Kassai Törekvés and ČsŠK were merged into one club named Jednota Košice. Jednota began playing in the Czechoslovak League in 1945. In the first season, they ended the league as fourth in Group B, which was considered as a nice success at the time.

=== VSS ===
VSS Košice kit.

Kassai AC and Jednota became VSS in 1952. The team got the name from the Slovak word Strojári (lit. 'engineers'), due to the main sponsor being VSS (Východoslovenské strojárne, engineering company). VSS became a stable member of the Czechoslovak First League and their best placing was second in 1970–71. In 1971 and 1973 VSS qualified for the UEFA Cup. In 1971 they won 2–1 against Spartak Moscow in the home leg and they drew 0–0 in Moscow, so that as the first team from Slovakia they progressed to the group stage of the Champions League. Two years later, VSS qualified for the UEFA Cup. Against Honvéd FC they won 1–0 at home and lost 2–5 away. The most successful VSS players include Andrej Kvašňák, Titus Buberník, Jaroslav Pollák, Dušan Galis (Euro 1976 Champions both), Anton Švajlen, Ján Pivarník, Jozef Bomba, and Jozef Desiatnik. VSS was renamed ZŤS in 1978.

=== 1990s ===
The twice Slovak football champions (1997, 1998) were relegated from the premier division in 2003 after the proposed sale of the club to Italian owners in 2001 by the former owner and late VSŽ steelmaking tycoon Alexander Rezeš fell through. Although Rezeš's dream to turn 1. FC Košice into a top European club never came true, he managed to lift an average second division team to the first group stage of the UEFA Champions' League in 1997–98. However, the next year's failure to make the same stage of the major European competition, and failure to defend the league title, combined with the change of government which undermined the position of the Rezeš clan (Alexander Rezeš was economy minister of Vladimír Mečiar's government in 1994–97) represented the beginning of the end of the "millionaires". Their home stadium was the Všešportový areál.

=== 1997–98 Champions League campaign ===
1. FC famously became the first Slovak club to reach the lucrative UEFA Champions League Group Stages when they did so in the 1997–98 season. Also during this Champions League campaign, 1. FC Košice became the first club in the Champions League history to record no points at all in the group stage, losing all their six games.

1. FC Košice are best known outside their homeland for their two clashes with Manchester United in the 1997–98 European Champions League group stages. Manchester United won both legs with the same score, 3–0. During this brief campaign in Europe's most prestigious club competition, Košice suffered a tragedy when midfielder Milan Čvirk was killed and striker Albert Rusnák was seriously injured in a car crash.

1. FC Košice kit. Orange and black symbolized of former sponsor VSŽ.

=== Recent history ===
2003–04 season, on the brink of financial collapse and relegation from the second division, the owners of 1. FC, were offered help by the president of Steel Trans Ličartovce Blažej Podolák, one of the favourites to advance to the premier league that season. Steel Trans also paid for the Čermeľ stadium in Košice, where all former 1. FC teams – now under the protective wings of Ličartovce played their matches. In 2004–05 season 1.FC Košice in effect became reserve team of Steel Trans Ličartovce, playing in the third division, group East. Košice, the second largest city in Slovakia, now had no club in the top two divisions (although many can remember two in the Czechoslovak federal league).

Reformed on 17 June 2005, FC Steel Trans Ličartovce was renamed MFK Košice. They ended the season gaining promotion back to the first division. In subsequent years MFK had minor successes, yet failed to win the league.

In 2008/09 season, the club won its first trophy in some 11 years, by beating Artmedia Petržalka in the final match of the Slovak Cup, in Senec. The match ended in a 3–1 win, with goals scored by Marko Milinković (28th minute), Róbert Cicman (56th minute) and Ján Novák (69th minute). The win granted Košice the right to compete in 2009-10 UEFA Europa League, which they entered in the Third qualifying round, in which they defeated FK Slavija Sarajevo 5–1 on aggregate, with Novák scoring two goals. In the subsequent Play-off, to which 3 of 4 Slovak teams qualified (Košice, Žilina and Slovan), Košice faced AS Rome, who were the 6th team of Serie A 2008-09. With the first match being played in Košice, the home side managed to stun the opponent by an early 5th-minute goal by Milinković, although thanks to two goals by Totti (the first coming from a controversial penalty) and Menez the away side took a 3–1 lead by 67th minute. However Ján Novák scored two goals, 71st and 81st minute, the second from a penalty, to complete the 3–3 draw against Rome. The following day, the headlines read: "Novák almost overshadowed Totti". It was one of the most memorable results of the club in recent history. In 2009, Nemanja Matić completed the biggest transfer in the history of the club, when he left for Chelsea, for an estimated €5.5 million and by mid-2010s, he became one of the biggest and most recognised midfielders in Europe.

MFK Košice won the Cup in 2013–14, yet their campaign in 2014-15 Europa League did not match the success of the 2009-10 Europa League, with Košice losing two matches against Slovan Liberec, 0–4 on aggregate.

=== Return to FC VSS Košice ===
In June 2015, MFK Košice returned to the name of FC VSS Košice, after being relegated to the Slovak Second Division for 2015–16 season, even the club finished 6th in the 2014-15 Fortuna Liga, 19 points above the relegation zone and . The relegation was caused as, then MFK Košice, failed to obtain a license, after financial difficulties and debts. The change of the name occurred to popularity of the "VSS" acronym from the Communist era, when it represented "Východoslovenské Strojárne" (Easter Slovak Engineering Works - a large employer in Košice and the nearby region). The firm however went bankrupt in 2013 and as a result the acronym was given a new meaning: V - Vernosť, S- Sila, S- Sláva - (Faithfulness - Power - Glory). The club hoped to return to Slovak top division within a season.

While winning the Eastern Group of 2015–16 DOXXbet liga with 2 points lead over Tatran Prešov, the club finished 2nd overall (Championship Group), only 2 points behind their archrivals Tatran Prešov, which celebrated the return to the top division after three seasons in the DOXXbet Liga. Košice failed to get promoted for failing to pay off their liabilities towards Ivan Đoković, who played for MFK between 2010 and 2012, and had three decisive points deducted from their score in the Championship Group by the SFZ, based on verdict by FIFA.

=== Dissolution ===
The club officially ceased operations on 27 July 2017. In August, the club's supporters' group announced their intention to reestablish the club and enter Slovak Sixth League for the 2018–19 season. They later decided to support a new club in Košice, FC Košice. They also talk about VSS succession.

== Affiliated clubs ==
The following clubs were affiliated with VSS Košice:

- (Russia) FC Zenit (2016–2017)

== Home stadium ==
The stadium is in the Čermeľ district, a multi-use stadium in Košice, Slovakia. It is currently used mostly for football matches as the home ground of VSS Košice since 1997. The stadium holds 10,787 (8,787 seated) spectators and was built in 1970. Initially, the stadium had been used by Lokomotíva Košice, while 1.FC Košice (now VSS) have played there since 1997. The Slovakia national football team has hosted a few matches at this stadium which now no longer meets UEFA criteria for international games.

=== New stadium ===
The club planned construction of the new stadium for 13,000 spectators in neighbourhood of demolished Všešportový areál stadium. The estimated cost of the stadium is €18.5 million. The owner od stadium is Košická Futbalová aréna (KFA), city of Košice owned 85% and club VSS Košice owned 15%. The construction will start in 2017. If the schedule is met, the first matches could be played by mid-2019.

== Supporters and rivalries ==
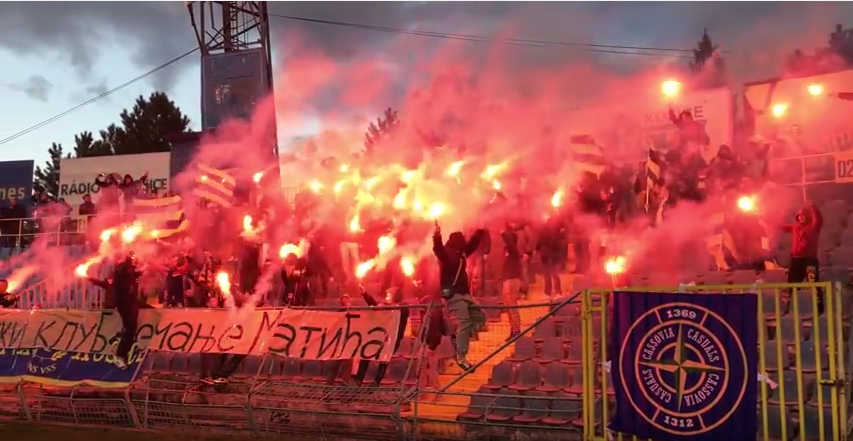
VSS fans

VSS Košice's most important rivalry is with FC Lokomotíva Košice. The match between them is called, Košické Derby (Košice Derby). VSS Košice and Lokomotíva Košice are both among historically the most successful football teams in the country. The next biggest rivalry is with 1. FC Tatran Prešov. Matches between these two clubs are referred to as the Eastern Slovak derby (Východniarske derby). They also have rivalries with ŠK Slovan Bratislava, FC Spartak Trnava and MŠK Žilina. VSS Košice supporters are called Viva Košice. VSS Košice supporters maintain friendly relations with fans of MFK Zemplín Michalovce, Czech Sparta Prague and Slavia Sofia.

== Historical names ==
Club name	Period
Kassai Athletikai Club (KAC)	1903–08
Merged with Kassai Sport Egyesület, renamed Kassai Atlétikai Sport Egyesület (KASE)	1908–11
Merged with Jogász Sport Egyesület	1911–18
SK Sparta Košice	1918–38
Kassai Atlétikai Club (KAC)	1938–42
Merged with Kassai Rákóczi SE, renamed Kassai Rákóczi Atlétikai Club	1942–45
Disbanded and then refounded as SK Jednota Košice	1945–52
TJ Spartak VSS	1952–56
TJ Spartak	1956–57
TJ Jednota	1957–62
TJ VSS	1962–79
ZŤS	1979–90
ŠK Unimex Jednota VSS	1990–92
1. FC	1992–04
MFK	2005–15
FC VSS	2015–17

Note: The club played 2004–05 season as Steel Trans Ličartovce reserve squad.

== Honours ==
MFK Košice positions in the Slovak Top Division

Czechoslovakia

- Czechoslovak First League (1925 – 1938, 1945 – 1993)
  - Runners-up (1): 1970–71
- Czechoslovak Cup (1961–1993)
  - Winners (1): 1992–93
  - Runners-up (3): 1963–64, 1972–73, 1979–80
- 1.SNL (1st Slovak National football league) (1969–1993)
  - Winners (3): 1973–74, 1977–78, 1992–93

Slovakia

- Slovak First Football League (1939 – 1944, 1993 – Present)
  - Winners (2): 1996–97, 1997–98
  - Runners-up (3): 1994–95, 1995–96, 1999–00
- Slovak Cup (1961 – Present)
  - Winners (5): 1972–73, 1979–80, 1992–93, 2008–09, 2013–14
  - Runners-up (3): 1980–81, 1997–98, 1999–00
- Slovak Super Cup (1993 – Present)
  - Winners (1): 1997
  - Runners-up (3): 1998, 2009, 2014
- Slovak Second Division (1993 – Present)
  - Winners (2): 2005–06, 2016–17

=== Czechoslovak and Slovak Top Goalscorer ===
The Czechoslovak League top scorer from 1944–45 until 1992–93. Since the 1993–94 Slovak League Top scorer.

Year	Winner	G
1975–76	(Czechoslovakia) Dušan Galis	21
1995–96	(Slovakia) Róbert Semeník	29
1996–97	(Slovakia) Jozef Kožlej	22
2007–08	(Slovakia) Ján Novák	17

^{1}Shared award

== Sponsorship ==
Period	Kit manufacturer	Shirt sponsor
1996–1997	lotto	VSŽ
1997–1998	Nike	VSŽ
1998–1999	Kappa	VSŽ Holding
1999–2000	Kappa	Omini
2000–2001	Nike	none
2001–2002	Erreà	none
2002–2003	Nike	none
2003–2004	Nike	RSC
2004–2005	Jako	STEEL TRANS
2005–2007	Puma	STEEL TRANS
2007–2008	Adidas	STEEL TRANS
2008–2009	Umbro	STEEL TRANS
2009–2012	Givova	STEEL TRANS
2012–2014	Nike	STEEL TRANS
2014–2016	Jako	STEEL TRANS
2016-2017	Jako	none

=== Club partners ===
- STEEL TRANS
- City of Košice

== Transfers ==
VSS have produced numerous players who have gone on to represent the Slovak national football team. Over the last period there has been a steady increase of young players leaving Košice after a few years of first team football and moving on to play football in leagues of a higher standard, with the Czech First League (Szilárd Németh and Miroslav Sovič to AC Sparta Prague, Vladimír Labant, Dávid Škutka and Matúš Kozáčik to SK Slavia Prague, Kamil Čontofalský to Bohemians 1905 in 1999; Marek Špilár to FC Baník Ostrava in 2000), Greece Super League (Vladimír Janočko to Skoda Xanthi in 2000), German 2. Bundesliga (Jozef Kožlej to SpVgg Greuther Fürth in 1998), Israel League (Ruslan Lyubarskyi to Maccabi Netanya F.C. in 2000), Polish Ekstraklasa (Ondrej Duda to Legia Warsaw in 2014), Portugal Primeira Liga (Uroš Matić to S.L. Benfica in 2013). The top transfer was agreed in 2009 when Nemanja Matić joined English FC Chelsea for a fee of €1.75 million,. In 1996, Pavel Nedvěd was formally transferred from AC Sparta Prague to 1. FC Košice for a tiny fee just a day before being sold to S.S. Lazio for €4.65 million, a loophole orchestrated by owner Alexander Rezeš to avoid paying a 30% sell-on fee to FC Viktoria Plzeň.

=== Record departures ===
Rank	Player	To	Fee	Year
1.	(Czech Republic) Pavel Nedvěd	(Italy) S.S. Lazio	€4.65 million	1996
2.	(Serbia) Nemanja Matić	(England) FC Chelsea	€1.75 million	2009
3.	(Slovakia) Szilárd Németh	(Czech Republic) AC Sparta Prague	€1.3 million (35mil.CZK)	1997
4.	(Serbia) Marko Milinković	(Slovakia) ŠK Slovan Bratislava	€0.35 million*	2011
4.	(Slovakia) Ondrej Duda	(Poland) Legia Warsaw	€0.35 million*	2014

*-unofficial fee

=== Record arrivals ===
Rank	Player	From	Fee	Year
1.	(Slovakia) Marek Špilár	(Slovakia) Tatran Prešov	€0.7 million (20mil SKK)*	1997
1.	(Hungary) András Telek	(Hungary) Ferencvárosi TC	€0.7 million (20mil SKK)*	1997

*-unofficial fee

== Results ==
=== League and Cup history ===
Slovak League only (1993–2017)

Season	Division (Name)	Pos./Teams	Pl.	W	D	L	GS	GA	P	Slovak Cup	Europe		Top Scorer (Goals)
1993–94	1st (Mars Superliga)	6/(12)	32	8	11	13	35	54	27	Quarter-finals	CWC	1R ( (Turkey) Beşiktaş J.K.)	?
1994–95	1st(Mars Superliga)	2/(12)	32	15	7	10	54	42	50	Quarter-finals	UI	Group 10 (2nd)	(Slovakia) Pavol Diňa (13)
1995–96	1st (Mars Superliga)	2/(12)	32	21	2	9	62	33	65	1st round	UC	PR ( (Hungary) Újpest FC)	(Slovakia) Róbert Semeník (29)
1996–97	1st (Mars Superliga)	1/(16)	30	21	7	2	61	19	70	1st round	UC	1QR ( (Scotland) Celtic F.C.)	(Slovakia) Jozef Kožlej (22)
1997–98	1st (Mars Superliga)	1/(16)	30	21	5	4	71	24	68	Runners-up	CL	Group stage (Group B,4th)	(Slovakia) Jozef Kožlej (14)
1998–99	1st (Mars Superliga)	4/(16)	30	19	4	7	51	26	61	2nd Round	CL; UC	2QR ( (Denmark) Brøndby IF); 1R ( (England) Liverpool F.C.)	(Ukraine) Ruslan Lyubarskyi (12)
1999–00	1st (Mars Superliga)	2/(16)	30	19	4	7	57	31	61	Runners-up			(Ukraine) Ruslan Lyubarskyi (15)
2000–01	1st (Mars Superliga)	9/(10)	36	10	7	19	42	61	37	1st Round	UC	1R ( (Austria) Grazer AK)	(Slovakia) Vladislav Zvara (8)
2001–02	1st (Mars Superliga)	9/(10)	36	6	13	17	30	62	31	1st Round			(Slovakia) Radoslav Zabavník (6)
2002–03	1st (Slovak Super Liga)	10/(10)	36	6	12	18	41	64	30	2nd Round			(Slovakia) Ľubomír Mati (10)
2003–04	2nd (1. Liga)	16/(16)	30	4	5	21	36	75	17	1st Round			?
2004–05	3rd (2. Liga)									Did not enter			(Slovakia) Pavol Piatka (23)
2005–06	2nd (1. Liga)	1/(16)	30	23	4	3	67	12	73	2nd Round			(Slovakia) Pavol Piatka (22)
2006–07	1st (Corgoň Liga)	5/(12)	28	10	5	13	31	35	35	2nd Round			(Slovakia) Jaroslav Kolbas (7)
2007–08	1st (Corgoň Liga)	6/(12)	33	13	6	14	45	44	45	Semi-finals			(Slovakia) Ján Novák (17)
2008–09	1st (Corgoň Liga)	4/(12)	33	14	10	9	48	42	52	Winner			(Slovakia) Ján Novák (12)
2009–10	1st (Corgoň Liga)	11/(12)	33	8	9	13	32	57	33	Quarter-finals	EL	P-O ( (Italy) A.S. Roma)	(Slovakia) Ján Novák (12)
2010–11	1st (Corgoň Liga)	10/(12)	33	8	9	16	28	44	33	2nd Round			(Serbia) Marko Milinković (5)
2011–12	1st (Corgoň Liga)	11/(12)	33	6	11	16	25	40	29	Quarter-finals			(Slovakia) Erik Pačinda (6)
2012–13	1st (Corgoň Liga)	5/(12)	33	12	11	10	38	33	47	Quarter-finals			(Slovakia) Dávid Škutka (13)
2013–14	1st (Corgoň Liga)	5/(12)	33	13	7	13	41	40	46	Winners			(Slovakia) Erik Pačinda (8)
2014–15	1st (Fortuna Liga)	6/(12)^{1}	33	11	8	14	43	48	41	Quarter-finals	EL	2QR ( (Czech Republic) Liberec)	(Bosnia and Herzegovina) Nermin Haskić (10)
2015–16	2nd (DOXXbet liga)	2/(24)	30	18	5	7	48	23	56 ^{2}	Quarter-finals			(Slovakia) Kamil Karaš (10)
2016–17	2nd (DOXXbet liga)	1/(24)	30	19	4	7	40	27	61	3rd Round			(Slovakia) Mojmír Trebuňák (4)

^{1} MFK Košice did not obtain a licence for the 2015–16 season ^{2} VSS Košice was docked 3 points for non–payment obligations.

=== European competition ===
==== UEFA-administered ====
Season	Competition	Round	Opponent	Agg.	Home leg	Away leg
1971–72	UEFA Cup	1st. Round	(Soviet Union) Spartak Moscow	2–3	2–1	0–2
1973–74	UEFA Cup	1st. Round	(Hungary) Budapest Honvéd	3–5	1–0	2–5
1993–94	Cup Winners' Cup	Qualifying	(Lithuania) FK Žalgiris	3–1	2–1	1–0
1993–94	Cup Winners' Cup	1st. Round	(Turkey) Beşiktaş	2–3	2–1	0–2
1995	UEFA Intertoto Cup	Group Stage	(England) Wimbledon	—N/a	1–1	—N/a
1995	UEFA Intertoto Cup	Group Stage	(Israel) Beitar Jerusalem	—N/a	—N/a	5–3
1995	UEFA Intertoto Cup	Group Stage	(Belgium) Charleroi	—N/a	3–2	—N/a
1995	UEFA Intertoto Cup	Group Stage	(Turkey) Bursaspor	—N/a	—N/a	1–1
1995–96	UEFA Cup	Preliminary	(Hungary) Újpest	1–3	0–1	1–2
1996–97	UEFA Cup	Preliminary	(Albania) KS Teuta	6–2	2–1	4–1
1996–97	UEFA Cup	Qualifying	(Scotland) Celtic	0–1	0–0	0–1
1997–98	Champions League	1st. Qualifying	(Iceland) ÍA	4–0	3–0	1–0
1997–98	Champions League	2nd. Qualifying	(Russia) Spartak Moscow	2–1	2–1	0–0
1997–98	Champions League	Group Stage	(England) Manchester United	4th	0–3	0–3
1997–98	Champions League	Group Stage	(Italy) Juventus	4th	0–1	2–3
1997–98	Champions League	Group Stage	(Netherlands) Feyenoord	4th	0–1	0–2
1998–99	Champions League	1st. Qualifying	(Northern Ireland) Cliftonville	13–1	8–0	5–1
1998–99	Champions League	2nd. Qualifying	(Denmark) Brøndby	1–2	0–2	1–0
1998–99	UEFA Cup	1st. Round	(England) Liverpool	0–8	0–3	0–5
2000–01	UEFA Cup	Qualifying	(Armenia) Ararat	4–3	1–1	3–2
2000–01	UEFA Cup	1st. Round	(Austria) Grazer AK	2–3	2–3	0–0
2009–10	Europa League	3rd. Qualifying	(Bosnia and Herzegovina) FK Slavija	5–1	3–1	2–0
2009–10	Europa League	Play-off	(Italy) Roma	4–10	3–3	1–7
2014–15	Europa League	2nd. Qualifying	(Czech Republic) Slovan Liberec	0–4	0–1	0–3

Competition	Pld	W	D	L	GF	GA	GD
Champions League	14	6	1	7	22	17	+5
Europa League	4	2	1	1	9	11	−2
UEFA Cup	16	5	3	8	18	28	−10
Cup Winners' Cup	4	3	0	1	5	4	+1
UEFA Intertoto Cup	4	2	2	0	10	7	+3
Total	42	18	7	17	64	67	–3

^{Key – Pld: Played, W: Won, D: Drawn, L: Lost, GF: Goals For, GA: Goals Against, GD: Goal Difference.}

==== Not UEFA-administered ====
Season	Competition	Round	Opponent	Home leg	Away leg
1964–65	Intertoto Cup	Group B3	(Poland) Szombierki Bytom	4–2	0–3
1964–65	Intertoto Cup	Group B3	(East Germany) Vorwärts Berlin	0–0	3–0
1964–65	Intertoto Cup	Group B3	(Austria) Wiener Sportclub	3–2	1–1
1965–66	Intertoto Cup	Group B2	(East Germany) Empor Rostock	0–3	0–1
1965–66	Intertoto Cup	Group B2	(Poland) Zagłębie Sosnowiec	4–3	0–3
1965–66	Intertoto Cup	Group B2	(Socialist Federal Republic of Yugoslavia) Radnički Niš	2–7	2–0
1966–67	Intertoto Cup	Group B5	(East Germany) Vorwärts Berlin	1–3	4–0
1966–67	Intertoto Cup	Group B5	(Sweden) Elfsborg	3–0	0–6
1966–67	Intertoto Cup	Group B5	(Germany) Borussia Neunkirchen	2–0	2–2
1967	Intertoto Cup	Group B6	(East Germany) Dynamo Dresden	0–0	2–1
1967	Intertoto Cup	Group B6	(Sweden) AIK	4–0	1–1
1967	Intertoto Cup	Group B6	(Denmark) AGF	3–1	1–1
1968	Intertoto Cup	Group B4	(Poland) Szombierki Bytom	2–3	2–0
1968	Intertoto Cup	Group B4	(Sweden) Djurgården	1–0	3–2
1968	Intertoto Cup	Group B4	(Germany) Werder Bremen	1–0	3–1
1969	Intertoto Cup	Group 8	(Poland) Wisła Kraków	0–4	4–0
1969	Intertoto Cup	Group 8	(Belgium) Lierse	2–1	1–1
1969	Intertoto Cup	Group 8	(Denmark) EfB	3–1	4–0
1970	Intertoto Cup	Group A5	(Sweden) Åtvidaberg	0–1	2–0
1970	Intertoto Cup	Group A5	(Germany) MSV Duisburg	1–1	3–0
1970	Intertoto Cup	Group A5	(Netherlands) Holland Sport Haag	4–1	2–0
1974	Intertoto Cup	Group 9	(Poland) ŁKS Łódź	1–1	1–3
1974	Intertoto Cup	Group 9	(Denmark) Randers Freja	6–1	3–1
1974	Intertoto Cup	Group 9	(Austria) Sturm Graz	6–0	2–2
1976	Intertoto Cup	Group 11	(Poland) Widzew Łódź	0–1	0–2
1976	Intertoto Cup	Group 11	(Denmark) KB	1–2	2–3
1976	Intertoto Cup	Group 11	(Norway) Start	2–0	1–0

== Reserve team ==
MFK Košice B was the reserve team of MFK Košice. They recently played in the Slovak 3. Liga (Eastern division), with their best performance being in Slovak Second Division. MFK Košice "B" played home matches at Barca stadium, near Košice. MFK Košice"B" stopped functioning before the 2014–15 season.

== Player records ==
=== Most goals ===
#	Nat.	Name	Goals
1	(Czechoslovakia)	Ján Strausz	115
2	(Czechoslovakia)	Dušan Galis	59
2	(Slovakia)	Ján Novák	59
4	(Slovakia)	Jozef Kožlej	52
5	(Slovakia)	Róbert Semeník	43

== Notable players ==
Had international caps for their respective countries. Players whose name is listed in bold represented their countries while playing for the club.

Past players who are the subjects of Wikipedia articles can be found here.

- (Czechoslovakia) Bohumil Andrejko
- (Slovakia) **Mário Bicák**
- (Czechoslovakia) Miloš Belák
- (Slovakia) **Marián Bochnovič**
- (Czechoslovakia) **Jozef Bomba**
- (Czechoslovakia) **Jaroslav Boroš**
- (Czechoslovakia) Titus Buberník
- (Slovakia) Martin Bukata
- (Slovakia) Matúš Čonka
- (Slovakia) Kamil Čontofalský
- (Czechoslovakia) **Ondrej Daňko**
- (Czechoslovakia) **Jozef Desiatnik**
- (Slovakia) Pavol Diňa
- (Czechoslovakia) Karol Dobay
- (Slovakia) Ondrej Duda
- (Slovakia) Miroslav Drobňák
- (Slovakia) **Peter Dzúrik**
- (Slovakia) Ľubomír Faktor
- (Czechoslovakia) Alexander Felszeghy
- (Czechoslovakia) Anton Flešár
- (Czechoslovakia) **Dušan Galis**
- (Bosnia and Herzegovina) Nermin Haskić
- (Czechoslovakia) (Slovakia) **Michal Hipp**
- (Czechoslovakia) **František Hoholko**
- (Slovakia) Zsolt Hornyák
- (Slovakia) Tomáš Huk
- (Slovakia) **Vladimír Janočko**
- (Slovakia) Martin Juhar
- (Slovakia) Marián Kello
- (Slovakia) **Jaroslav Kolbas**
- (Central African Republic) **Jésus Konnsimbal**
- (Slovakia) Matúš Kozáčik
- (Slovakia) **Ivan Kozák**
- (Slovakia) Ján Kozák jr.
- (Slovakia) **Jozef Kožlej**
- (Czechoslovakia) Andrej Kvašňák
- (Slovakia) Vladimír Labant
- (Slovakia) Martin Lipčák
- (Slovakia) **Pavol Majerník**
- (Slovakia) Jozef Majoroš
- (Serbia) **Nemanja Matić**
- (Serbia) Uroš Matić
- (Serbia) **Marko Milinković**
- (Czechoslovakia) (Slovakia) **Ladislav Molnár**
- (Guadeloupe) (Madagascar) Jean-Pierre Morgan
- (Czechoslovakia) Milan Nemec
- (Slovakia) **Szilárd Németh**
- (Slovakia) **Ján Novák**
- (Slovakia) Martin Obšitník
- (Slovakia) Tomáš Oravec
- (Slovakia) Erik Pačinda
- (Slovakia) Michal Pančík (born 1971)
- (Slovakia) **Jozef Pisár**
- (Czechoslovakia) **Ján Pivarník**
- (Czechoslovakia) **Jaroslav Pollák**
- (Slovakia) **Karol Praženica**
- (Slovakia) Martin Prohászka
- (Slovakia) Marek Rodák
- (Slovakia) Albert Rusnák
- (Slovakia) Štefan Rusnák
- (Slovakia) Marek Sapara
- (Slovakia) Boris Sekulić
- (Slovakia) Miroslav Seman
- (Slovakia) **Róbert Semeník**
- (Czechoslovakia) Adolf Scherer
- (Slovakia) **Július Šimon**
- (Slovakia) Peter Šinglár
- (Slovakia) Anton Šoltis
- (Slovakia) **Miroslav Sovič**
- (Slovakia) **Marek Špilár**
- (Czechoslovakia) **Anton Švajlen**
- (Czechoslovakia) **Jozef Štafura**
- (Czechoslovakia) Ján Strausz
- (Czechoslovakia) (Slovakia) Ladislav Tamáš
- (Hungary) András Telek
- (North Macedonia) **Darko Tofiloski**
- (Slovakia) **Dušan Tóth**
- (Slovakia) Rudolf Urban
- (Slovakia) Blažej Vaščák
- (Czechoslovakia) **Vladimír Weiss sr.**
- (Slovakia) Radoslav Zabavník
- (Slovakia) **Tibor Zátek**
- (Slovakia) **Vladislav Zvara**

== Managerial history ==
Name	Nationality	Period
Jozef Vengloš	(Czechoslovakia)	1969–73
Jozef Jankech	(Czechoslovakia)	1973–75
Štefan Jačiansky	(Czechoslovakia)	1975–76
Alexander Felszeghy	(Czechoslovakia)	1976–77
Jozef Karel	(Czechoslovakia)	1980–81
Vladimír Hrivnák	(Czechoslovakia)	1982
František Skyva	(Czechoslovakia)	1983
Michal Baránek	(Czechoslovakia)	1984
Andrej Ištók	(Czechoslovakia)	1985
Jozef Jankech	(Czechoslovakia)	1991
Jozef Móder	(Czechoslovakia)	1992
Ján Zachar	(Slovakia)	1993
Stanislav Seman	(Slovakia)	1994
Jozef Obert	(Slovakia)	1994
Ján Zachar	(Slovakia)	1994
Dušan Radolský	(Slovakia)	1995–96
Ján Kozák	(Slovakia)	1996–97
Karol Pecze	(Slovakia)	1997–98
Ján Kozák	(Slovakia)	1998–99

Name	Nationality	Period
Ján Zachar	(Slovakia)	1999
Ladislav Molnár	(Slovakia)	1999–00
Jozef Valovič	(Slovakia)	2000–01
Erik Bogdanovský	(Slovakia)	2001–02
Jaroslav Gürtler	(Czech Republic)	2002
Ondrej Daňko	(Slovakia)	2002–03
Bohumil Andrejko	(Slovakia)	2003
Ján Kozák	(Slovakia)	July 1, 2005 – Jan 5, 2010
Goran Milojević	(Serbia)	Jan 12, 2010 – June 30, 2010
Žarko Đurović	(Serbia)	July 1, 2010 – Sept 28, 2010
Štefan Tarkovič	(Slovakia)	Sept 28, 2010 – June 30, 2011
Ladislav Šimčo	(Slovakia)	July 1, 2011 – April 29, 2012
Ján Kozák	(Slovakia)	April 30, 2012 – June 30, 2013
Jaroslav Galko	(Slovakia)	July 1, 2013 – Sept 13
Radoslav Látal	(Czech Republic)	Sept 19, 2013 – Nov 29, 2014
Marek Fabuľa	(Slovakia)	Jan 7, 2015 – Sep 21, 2015
Jozef Vukušič	(Slovakia)	Sep 22, 2015 – Dec 31, 2015
Jaroslav Galko	(Slovakia)	Jan 25, 2016 – May 4, 2016
Ivan Lapšanský	(Slovakia)	May 4, 2016 – June 10, 2016
Jozef Majoroš	(Slovakia)	July 7, 2016 – 27 July 2017
