= FC Lokomotíva Košice =

Slovak association football club

Lokomotíva Košice
- Full name: FC Lokomotíva Košice
- Nickname: Loky
- Founded: 1946; 80 years ago
- Ground: Štadión Lokomotívy, Košice
- Capacity: 9,200
- President: Roman Nižník
- Head coach: Ondrej Desiatnik
- League: 3. liga Group East
- 2025–26: 10th
- Website: https://fclokomotiva.com
Home colours	Away colours

FC Lokomotíva Košice is a Slovak football club, based in Košice and competing in the 3rd tier of Slovak football, 3. liga. The club was founded in 1946 and spent 25 seasons playing in the Czechoslovak First League.

The club also had several appearances in Europe, playing the 1977–78 European Cup Winners' Cup and the 1978–79 UEFA Cup.

== Club history ==
In 1951 and the 1977–1978 season, the club finished 3rd in the Czechoslovak First League. The club won the Czechoslovak Cup in the 1976–77 and 1978–79 seasons, beating Teplice and Baník Ostrava, respectively, with both finals held in Prague. In the 1970s, striker Ladislav Józsa was the First League's top scorer three times: in 1972–73 outright with 21 goals, in 1973–74 shared with Přemysl Bičovský (17 goals each), and again outright in 1976–77 with 18 goals.

The last major success of the club was winning the Slovak Cup in the 1984–1985 season. The 1985–86 season was the last for the club in the Czechoslovak First League. That season the team finished next to last, 15th place in the league and were relegated to the 2nd division.

After the disintegration of Czechoslovakia, the club took part in the Corgoň Liga. In the 1993–1994 season they took 8th place out of 12 participants. In the 1997–1998 season, finishing next to last, 15th place, they were relegated to the second league. In the 1999–2000 season in the second division championship, the club finished in 17th place and were relegated to the third division. In the 2003–2004 season they dropped to the 4th division.

They withdrew from the second league after the 2018-19 season due to financial problems.

== Club's name ==
- 1946 - ŠK Železničiari Košice
- 1946 - ŠK Železničiari Sparta Košice
- 1949 - ZSJ Dynamo ČSD Košice
- 1952 - TJ Lokomotíva Košice
- 1965 - TJ Lokomotíva VSŽ Košice
- 1967 - TJ Lokomotíva Košice
- 1990 - FK Lokomotíva Košice
- 1994 - FK Lokomotíva Energogas Košice
- 1997 - FC Lokomotíva Košice
- 1999 - FC Spoje Lokomotíva Košice
- 2005 - FC Lokomotíva Košice

== Stadium ==
Initially Lokomotíva played at Lokomotíva Stadium in the Čermeľ district for most of its history (until 1997). Lokomotíva played in a small village named Družstevná pri Hornáde 16 km far from city center of Košice. As of 2022, Lokomotíva returned to its home ground Lokomotíva Stadium.

== Honours ==
=== Domestic ===
Czechoslovakia

- Czechoslovak First League (1925–93)
  - Third place (2): 1951, 1977–78
- Czechoslovak Cup (1961–1993)
  - Winners (2): 1977, 1979

Slovakia

- Slovak Cup (1961–)
  - Winners (3): 1977, 1979, 1985
  - Runners-up (2): 1961, 1992

=== European ===
- European Railways Cup
  - Runners-up (3): 1976, 1979, 1983

== Results ==
=== League and domestic cup history ===
Slovak League only (1993-present)

Year	Division	Position	Domestic cup	Topscorer/goals
1993–94	Mars superliga (I)	8th	Round 3	
1994–95	Mars superliga	9th	Round 2	(Slovakia) Štefan Kysela (17)
1995–96	Mars superliga	8th	Round 1	(Slovakia) Igor Popovec (8)
1996–97	Mars superliga	10th	Quarter-finals	
1997–98	Mars superliga	15th (relegated)	Semi-finals	(Slovakia) Marcel Korínek (4) (Bosnia and Herzegovina) Milan Pecelj (4)
1998–99	2. liga (II)	–	Round 1	(Slovakia) Miloš Gallo (8)
1999–2000	2. liga	– (relegated)		
2000–01	3. liga (III)	–	Round 1	
2001–02	3. liga	–		
2002–03	3. liga	–		
2003–04	3. liga	– (relegated)		
2004–05	4. liga (IV)	–		
2005–06	4. liga (IV)	1st (promoted)		
2006–07	3. liga (III)	–		
2007–08	3. liga (III)	–		
2008–09	3. liga (III)	3rd		
2009–10	3. liga (III)	2nd		
2010–11	3. liga (III)	1st (promoted)		
2011–12	3. liga (III)	3rd	Round 1	
2012–13	Keno 10 3.liga (III)	3rd	Round 3	
2013–14	TIPOS liga (III)	8th (promoted)	Round 1	
2014–15	DOXXbet liga (II)	1st (relegation round east)	Round 3	(Slovakia) Tomáš Labun (16)
2015–16	DOXXbet liga (II)	4th (champions round)	Round 3	(Slovakia) Adrián Leško (8)
2016–17	DOXXbet liga (II)	7th (champions round)	Round 4	(Slovakia) Róbert Jano (20)
2017–18	DOXXbet liga (II)	4th	Round 4	(Slovakia) Kamil Karaš (13)
2018–19	II. Liga (II)	11th	Round 5	(Slovakia) Róbert Jano (7)
2019–20	V.liga Košicko-gemerská (V)	2nd	Did not enter	(Slovakia) Vladimír Beliš (9)
2020–21	V.liga Košicko-gemerská (V)	2nd	Round 3	?
2021–22	V.liga Košicko-gemerská (V)	1st	Round 3	(Slovakia) Adrián Pačinda (26)
2022–23	V.liga juh (V)	1st (promoted)	Did not enter	(Slovakia) Martin Leško (26)
2023–24	4. Liga Východ (IV)	2nd (promoted)	Round 3	(Slovakia) Michal Vilkovský (19)
2024–25	3. Liga Východ (III)	9th	Round 3	(Slovakia) Jakub Škovran (21)
2025-26	3. Liga Východ (III)	10th	Round 3	(Slovakia) Mikuláš Demjanovič (5)

=== European competition history ===
Season	Competition	Round	Country	Club	Home	Away	Aggregate
1969–70	Mitropa Cup	1.R	(Socialist Federal Republic of Yugoslavia)	Radnicki Kragujevac	1–0	0–2	1–2
1977–78	Cup Winners' Cup	1.R	(Sweden)	Östers IF	0–0	2–2	2–2 (a)
1977–78	Cup Winners' Cup	2.R	(Austria)	FK Austria Wien	1–1	0–0	1–1 (a)
1978–79	UEFA Cup	1.R	(Italy)	A.C. Milan	1–0	0–1	1–1 (p)
1979–80	Cup Winners' Cup	1.R	(Austria)	FC Wacker Innsbruck	2–1	1–0	3–1
1979–80	Cup Winners' Cup	2.R	(Socialist Federal Republic of Yugoslavia)	NK Rijeka	2–0	0–3	2–3

== Current squad ==
As of September 19, 2019. Note: Flags indicate national team as defined under FIFA eligibility rules; some limited exceptions apply. Players may hold more than one non-FIFA nationality.

No.	Pos.	Nation	Player
1	GK	SVK	Samuel Knap
22	GK	SVK	Jozef Talian
2	DF	SVK	Nikolas Kriška
3	DF	SVK	Ľuboslav Pankovčin
4	DF	SVK	Richard Griglak
5	DF	SVK	Milan Miklušićák
6	DF	SVK	Samuel Jokeľ
12	DF	SVK	Michal Godina
12	DF	SVK	Kristián Šarkan
13	DF	SVK	Patrik Grega
21	DF	SVK	Adrián Tomašiak
8	MF	SVK	Jakub Tóth

No.	Pos.	Nation	Player
9	MF	SVK	Dávid Gabriel Matis
10	MF	SVK	Vladimír Beliš
14	MF	SVK	Matej Béreš
17	MF	SVK	Michal Beli
19	MF	SVK	Matej Ondrejkovič
20	MF	SVK	Martin Hloušek
21	MF	SVK	Gabriel Labuda
8	FW	SVK	Filip Korček
11	FW	SVK	Martin Šemrák
14	FW	SVK	Maroš Čeremeta
18	FW	SVK	Pavol Kozák

=== Technical staff ===
Position	Staff
Head coach	(Slovakia) Milan Lalkovič
Assistant coach	(Slovakia) Jozef Talian
Assistant coach	(Slovakia) Martin Hloušek
Goalkeeping coach	(Slovakia) Jozef Talian
Masseur	(Slovakia) Karol Orbán
Team Chef	(Slovakia) Anton Zabavník

== Player records ==
=== Most appearances ===
#	Nat.	Name	App.
1	(Czechoslovakia)	Gejza Farkaš	344
2	(Czechoslovakia)	František Feczko	300
3	(Czechoslovakia)	Jozef Móder	289
4	(Czechoslovakia)	Jozef Suchánek	269
5	(Czechoslovakia)	Stanislav Seman	225

=== Most goals ===
#	Nat.	Name	Goals
1	(Czechoslovakia)	Ladislav Józsa	104
2	(Czechoslovakia)	František Feczko	78
3	(Czechoslovakia)	Gejza Farkaš	70
4	(Czechoslovakia)	Jozef Móder	66
5	(Czechoslovakia)	Ján Kozák sr.	44
6	(Czechoslovakia)	Pavol Ondo	40
7	(Czechoslovakia)	Dušan Ujhely	30

== Notable players ==
Had international caps for their respective countries. Players whose name is listed in bold represented their countries while playing for Lokomotiva.

Past (and present) players who are the subjects of Wikipedia articles can be found here.

- (Czechoslovakia) Ján Polgár
- (Czechoslovakia) Bohumil Andrejko
- (Czechoslovakia) **Pavol Biroš**
- (Czechoslovakia) **Ivan Čabala**
- (Slovakia) Matúš Čonka
- (Slovakia) Pavol Diňa
- (Czechoslovakia) **Gejza Farkaš**
- (Czechoslovakia) **František Feczko**
- (Czechoslovakia) **Anton Flešár**
- (Czechoslovakia) Milan Gigler
- (Czechoslovakia) Miroslav Greskovics
- (Czechoslovakia) Andrej Iľko
- (Czechoslovakia) **Július Holeš**
- (Czechoslovakia) **Ladislav Józsa**
- (Slovakia) Karol Kisel
- (Czechoslovakia) **Ján Kozák sr.**
- (Czechoslovakia) František Kunzo
- (Czechoslovakia) Ján Luža
- (Czechoslovakia) **František Matys**
- (Czechoslovakia) **Jozef Móder**
- (Slovakia) Martin Obšitník
- (Slovakia) Erik Pačinda
- (Czechoslovakia) Ladislav Putyera
- (Czechoslovakia) **Stanislav Seman**
- (Czechoslovakia) Adolf Scherer
- (Czechoslovakia) Viliam Schrojf
- (Slovakia) Miroslav Sovič
- (Czechoslovakia) **Stanislav Strapek**
- (Slovakia) Anton Šoltis
- (Slovakia) Peter Štyvar
- (Slovakia) Rudolf Urban
- (Slovakia) Blažej Vaščák
- (Czechoslovakia) Rudolf Zibrínyi
- (Czechoslovakia) Ľudovít Žitňár

== Notable managers ==
- (Czechoslovakia) Michal Baránek (1972)
- (Czechoslovakia) Ladislav Kačáni (1972–1974)
- (Czechoslovakia) Jozef Jankech (1975–1976)
- (Czechoslovakia) Michal Baránek (1976–1978)
- (Czechoslovakia) Jozef Jankech (1978–1980)
- (Czechoslovakia) Jozef Jankech (1983–1985)
- (Czechoslovakia) Michal Baránek (1985–1986)
- (Slovakia) Jaroslav Galko (2013–2014)
- (Slovakia) Dušan Ujhely (2014–2015)
- (Slovakia) Branislav Sokoli (2015–2016)
- (Slovakia) Albert Rusnák (2016–2018)
- (Slovakia) Ľuboš Benkovský (2018–2019)
- (Slovakia) Dušan Ujhely (2019–2020)
- (Slovakia) Milan Lalkovič (2020-2024)
- (Slovakia) Martin Juhar (2025-2026)
- (Slovakia) Ondrej Desiatnik (2026-)

== Bibliography ==
- Jindřich Horák; Lubomír Král (1997), Encyklopedie našeho fotbalu (in Czech), Libri
- Jeřábek, Luboš (2007). Český a československý fotbal – lexikon osobností a klubů (in Czech). Prague: Grada Publishing. ISBN 978-80-247-1656-5.
