= List of people from Bratislava =

Coat of Arms of Bratislava

This is an alphabetically sorted list of personalities from Bratislava in Slovakia. Due to the city's former multi-cultural character, in addition to Slovaks it includes people of German, Austrians, Hungarian and other nationalities.

== A ==
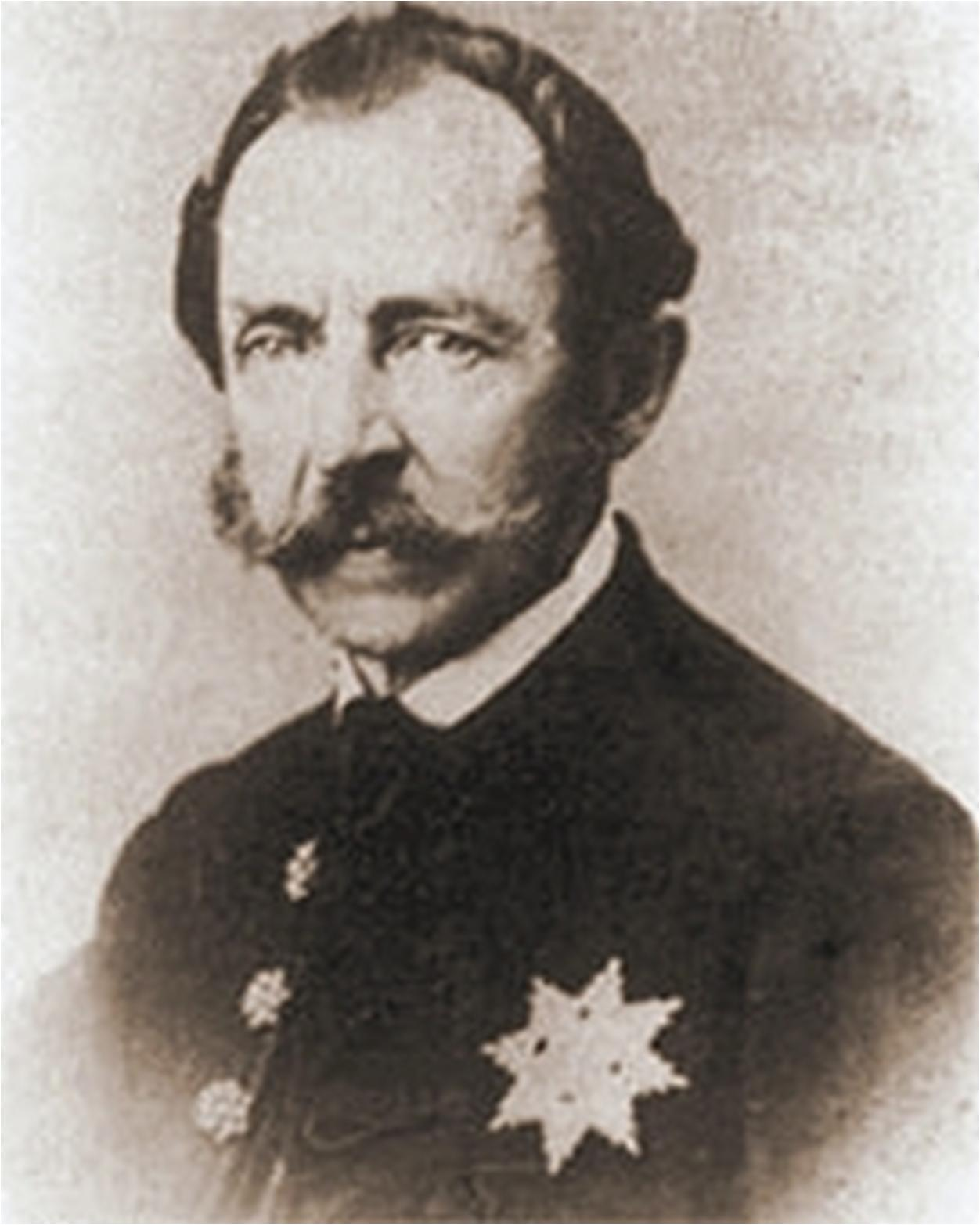
Count Apponyi, Lord Chancellor of Hungary (1846–1848)

- Michaela Abrhámová (born 1993), Slovak volleyball player
- Ladislav Almási (born 1999), Slovak football player.
- Alena Antalová (born 1972), Slovak actress
- Dimitrij Andrusov (1897–1976), Slovak geologist of Russian origin, member of the Slovak Academy of Sciences.
- Stanislav Angelovič (born 1982), Slovak football player.
- György Apponyi (1808–1899), Hungarian conservative politician.
- Peter Aristone (born 1980), Slovak singer-songwriter, multi-instrumentalist and producer.
- Ján Arpáš (1917–1976), Slovak football player.
- Christian Attersee (born 1940), Austrian painter.
- Radoslav Augustín (born 1987), Slovak football player.
- Lajos Aulich (1793–1849), Hungarian general and third Defence minister of Hungary.

== B ==
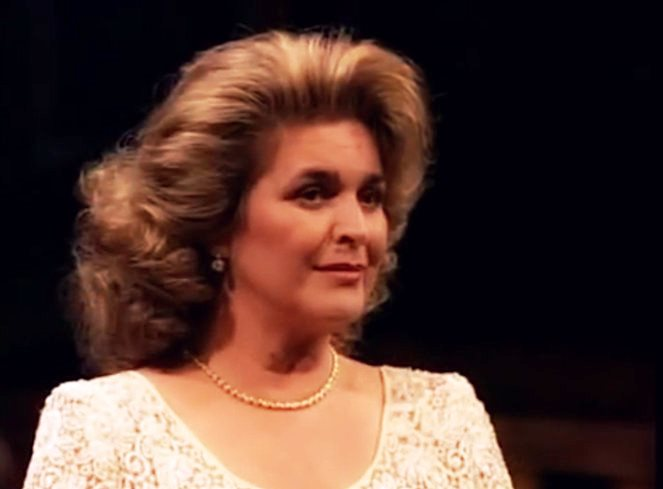
Gabriela Beňačková, lyric soprano

- Andrej Babiš (born 1954), Czech politician and businessman.
- Tomáš Bagi (born 1991), Slovak football player.
- Fritz Balogh (1920–1951), German football player.
- Jozef Banáš (born 1948), Slovak novelist, journalist, diplomat and politician.
- Alojz Baránik (born 1954), Slovak lawyer and politician.
- Denisa Baránková (2001–2006), Slovak sports archer.
- Gyula Bárdos (born 1958), Hungarian politician.
- Judit Bárdos (born 1988), Slovak actress.
- Kázmér Batthyány (1807–1854), Hungarian politician, minister.
- Lajos Batthyány (1807–1849), Hungarian magnate, first prime minister of Hungary.
- Ľubomír Belák (born 1951), Slovak musician, vocalist, music composer and TV producer.
- Gabriela Beňačková (born 1947), Slovak lyric soprano.
- Monika Beňová (born 1968), Slovak politician.
- Klaudia Boczová (born 1990), Slovak tennis player.
- Shlomo Breznitz (born 1936), Israeli author, psychologist, and president of the University of Haifa.
- Peter Brezovan (born 1979), Slovak football player.
- Petra Brocková (born 1976), Slovak actress and stand-up comedian.
- Dagmar Bruckmayerová (born 1969), Slovak actress.
- Katarína Brychtová (born 1967), Slovak actress and television presenter.
- Celeste Buckingham (born 1995), Slovak singer and songwriter.
- Béla Bugár (born 1958), Slovak politician.
- Martin Bútora (born 1944), Slovak sociologist, writer, university professor and diplomat.

== C ==
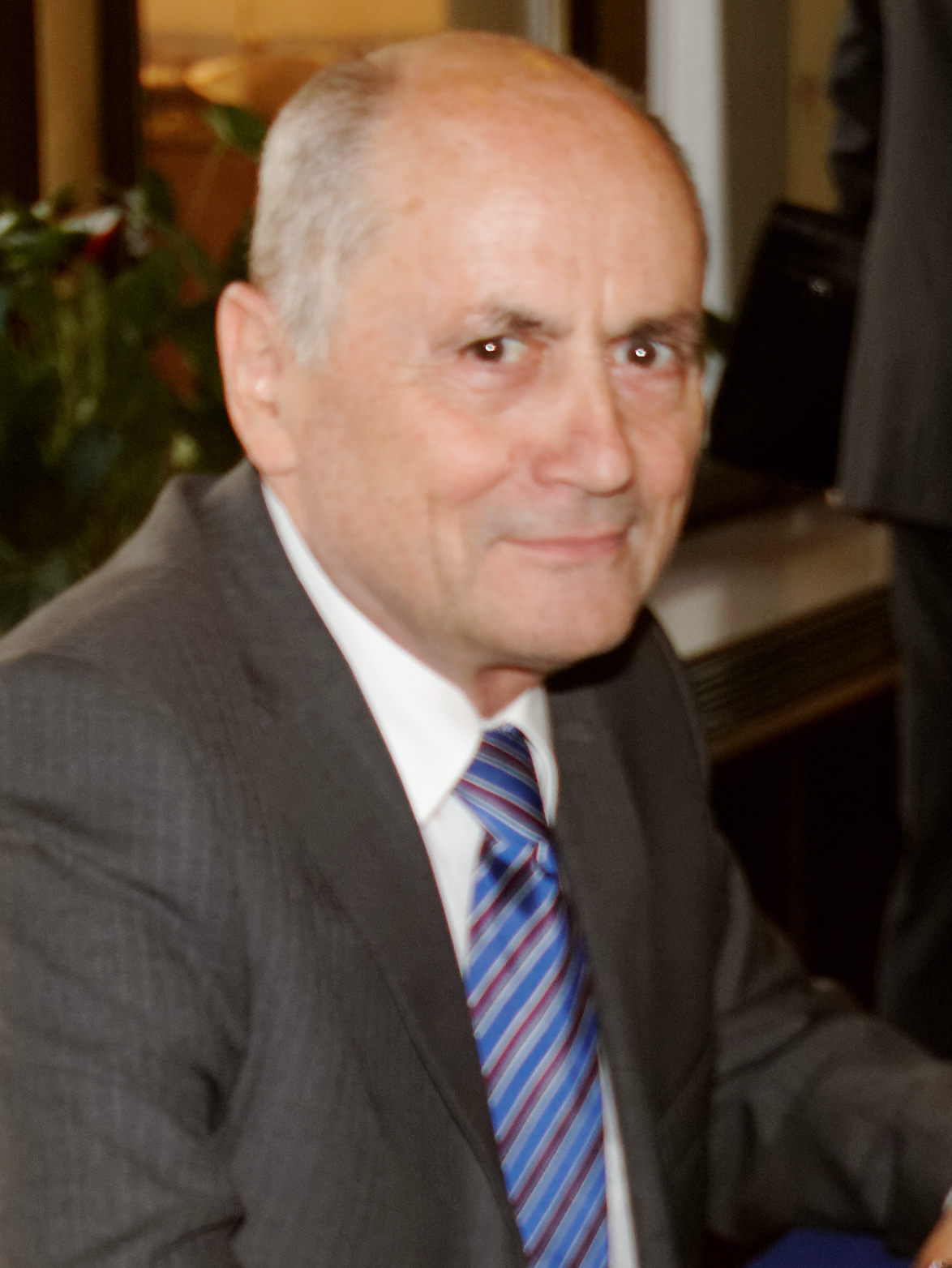
Ján Čarnogurský

- Maxim Čajkovič (born 2001), Slovak ice hockey player
- Štefan Čambal (1908–1990), Slovak football player.
- Ján Čapkovič (born 1948), Slovak football player.
- Jozef Čapkovič (born 1948), Slovak football player.
- Dušan Čaplovič (born 1946), Slovak politician.
- Ivan Čarnogurský (1933–2022), Slovak businessman and politician.
- Ján Čarnogurský (born 1944), Slovak politician.
- Soňa Čechová (1930–2007), Slovak translator.
- Roman Čerepkai (born 2002), Slovak football player.
- Pavol Červenák (born 1987), Slovak tennis player.
- Štefan Chrappa (born 1979), aka Pišta Vandal, Slovak musician, writer and theologian.
- Peter Chrappan (born 1984), Slovak football player.
- Dominika Cibulková (born 1989), Slovak tennis player.
- Ivan Čičmanec (born 1942), Slovak writer.
- Jana Bittó Cigániková (born 1983), Slovak politician.
- Erik Čikoš (born 1988), Slovak football player.
- Jakub Čunta (born 1996), Slovak football player.
- Juraj Czinege (born 1977), Slovak football player.

== D ==
- Herta Däubler-Gmelin (born 1943), German politician.
- Anna Daučíková (born 1950), Slovak visual artist and activist.
- Árpád Degen (1866–1934), Hungarian biologist, member of the Hungarian Academy of Sciences.
- Marián Dirnbach (born 1979), Slovak football player.
- Martin Dobrotka (born 1985), Slovak football player.
- Ernst von Dohnányi (1877–1960), Hungarian pianist and composer.
- Marek Dolezaj (born 1998), Slovak professional basketball player.
- Andrej Doležal (born 1981), Slovak politician.
- Erzsébet Dolník (1940–2021), Slovak politician.
- Emília Došeková (1937–2021), Slovak actress
- Ondrej Dostál (born 1971), Slovak politician and former journalist.
- Juraj Draxler (born 1975), Slovak political scientist and politician.
- Tomáš Drucker (born 1978), Slovak politician.
- Ľudovít Dubovský (1918–1998), Slovak football player.
- Peter Dubovský (footballer) (1972–2000), Slovak football player.
- Jana Dukátová (born 1983), Slovak slalom canoeist.
- Árpád Duka-Zólyomi (1941–2013), Hungarian nuclear physicist, university teacher and politician from Slovakia.
- Bucura Dumbravă (1868–1926), Romanian writer and esotericist.
- Lucia Dvorská (born 1988), Slovak model
- Filip Ďuriš (born 1995), Slovak football player.
- Jozef Džubara (born 1965), Slovak football player.

== E ==
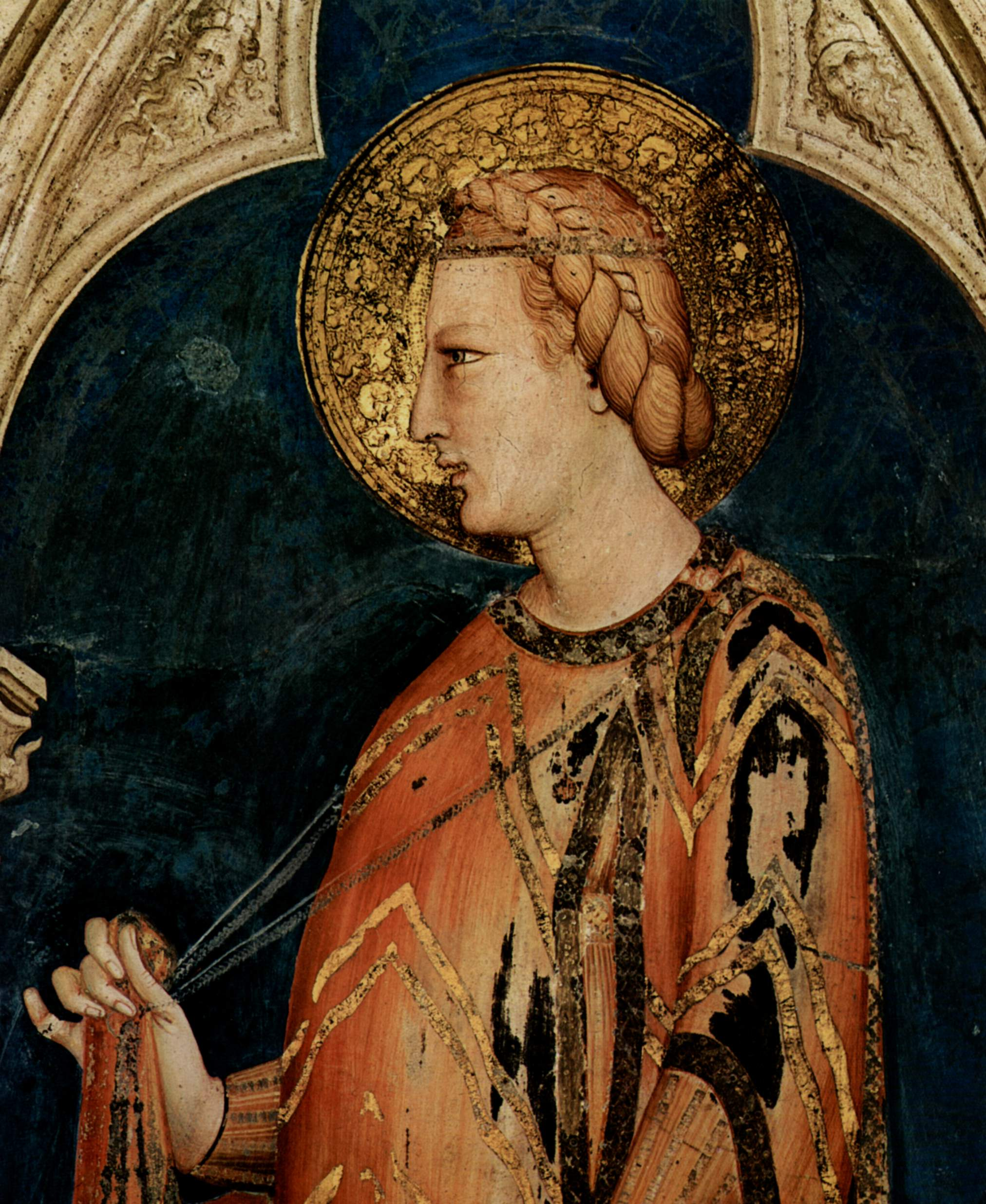
Saint Elisabeth of Hungary

- Stephan Ladislaus Endlicher (1804–1849), Austrian botanist.
- Árpád Érsek (born 1958), Slovak politician.
- Yvette Estermann (born 1967), Swiss politician.
- Elizabeth of Hungary (1207–1231), Catholic Saint.

== F ==
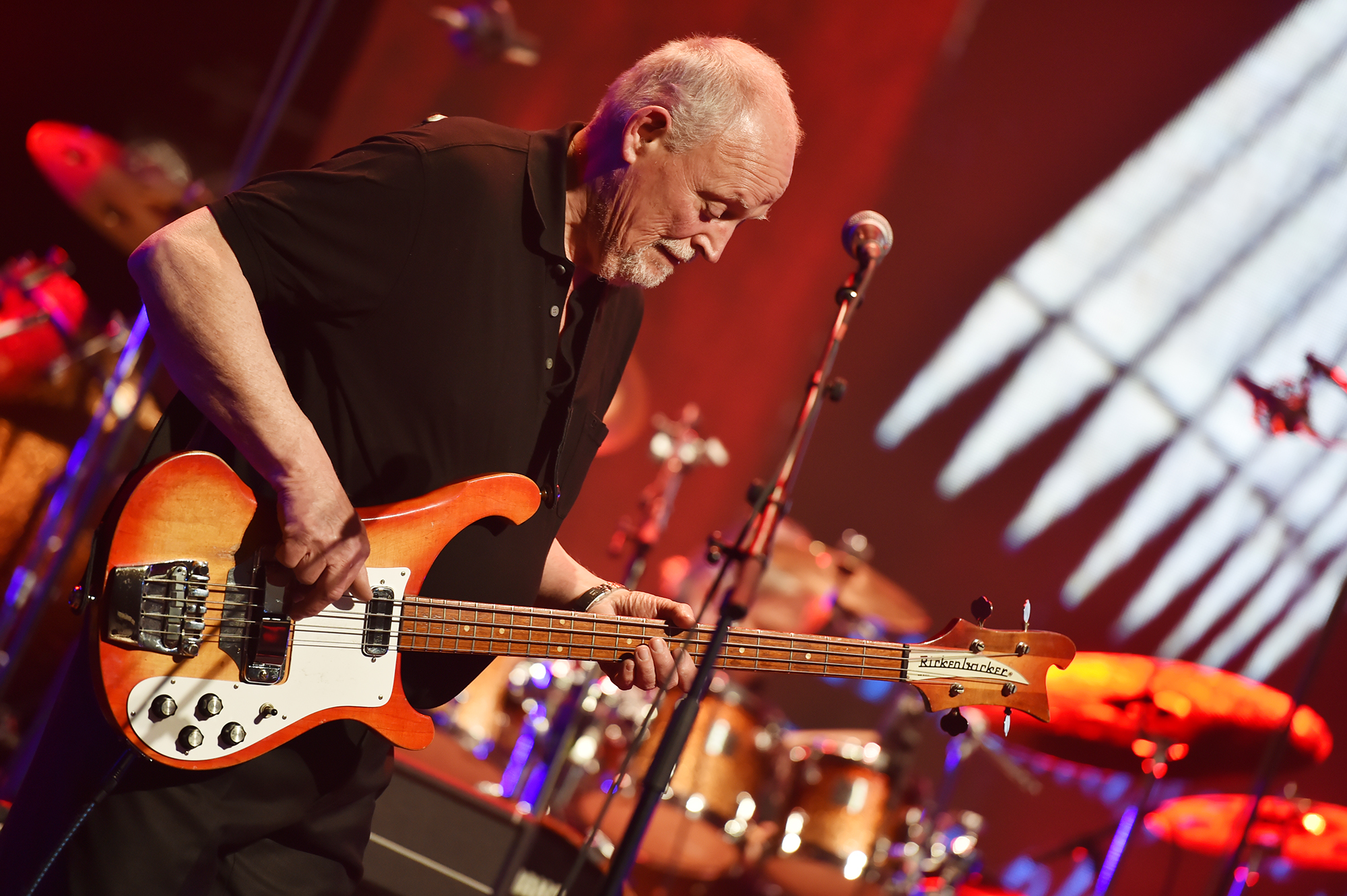
Fedor Frešo, jazz and rock bassist

- Ferdinand Faczinek (1911–1991), Slovak football player.
- János Fadrusz (1858–1903), Hungarian sculptor.
- Kristína Farkašová (born 1982), Slovak actress, singer, dramaturge, presenter, comedian, editor, blogger and naïve art painter.
- Dana Fecková (born 1987), Slovak football player.
- Martin Fehérváry (born 1999), Slovak ice hockey player.
- Zuzana Fialová (born 1974), Slovak actress.
- Peter Fieber (born 1964), Slovak football player.
- Peter Fieber (footballer, born 1989) (born 1989), Slovak football player.
- Fedor Flašík (1958–2024), Slovak political marketer
- Gisi Fleischmann (1894–1944), leader of the Bratislava Working Group.
- Branislav Fodrek (born 1981), Slovak football player.
- Natália Fondrková (born 1997), Slovak field hockey player.
- Flora Frangepán (fl. 1743), Hungarian writer.
- Fedor Frešo (1947–2018), Slovak rock and jazz bassist and singer.
- Ľubomír Ftáčnik (born 1957), Slovak chess master.
- Ferdinand Udvardy (1895–1945), World War I flying ace of the Austro-Hungarian Empire.

== G ==
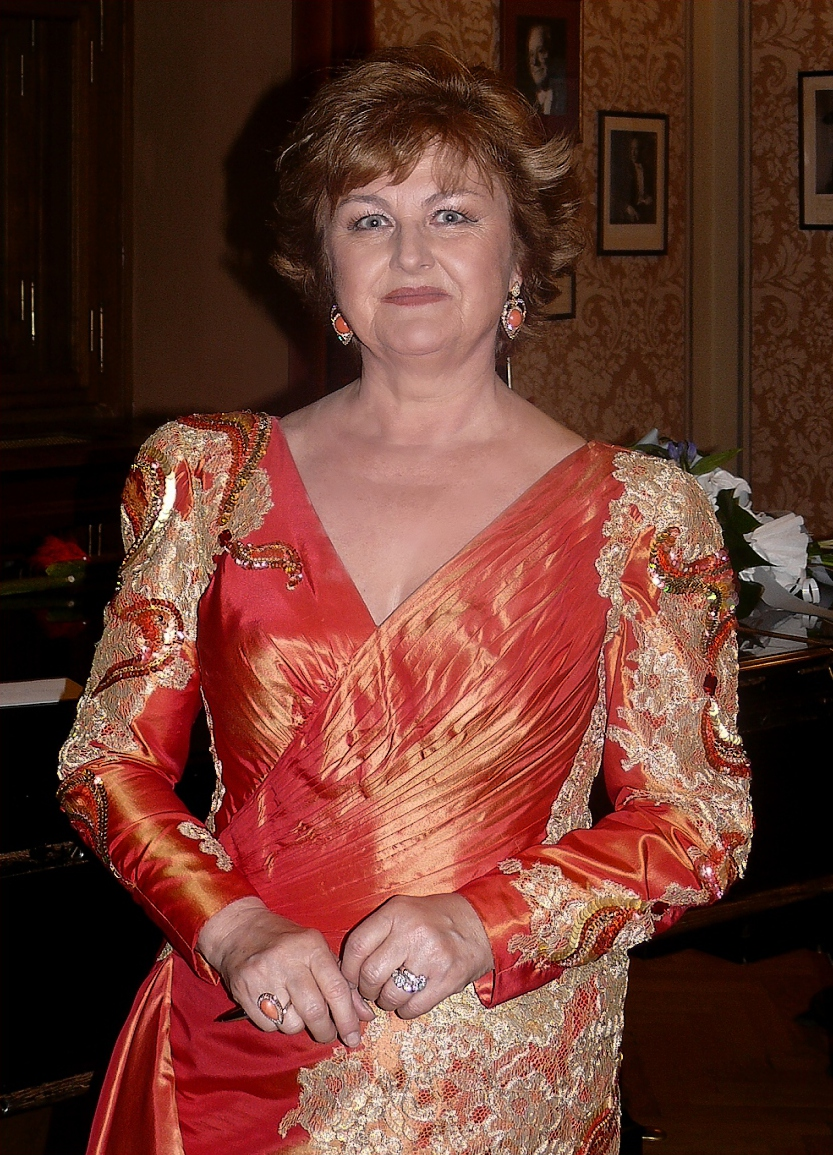
Edita Gruberova

- Tina Gažovičová (born 1986), Slovak politician.
- Lukáš Gašparovič (born 1993), Slovak football player.
- Lenka Gazdíková (born 1986), Slovak football player.
- Martin Glváč (born 1967), Slovak politician.
- Vladimír Godár (born 1956), Slovak classical and film score composer.
- Jozef Golonka (born 1938), Slovak ice hockey player and coach.
- József Grassy (1894–1946), Hungarian military officer.
- Patrik Gregora (born 1993), Slovak football player.
- Gréta Gregorová (born 2001), Slovak politician.
- Dominik Greif (born 1997), Slovak football player.
- Gábor Grendel (born 1980), Slovak journalist and politician.
- Edita Gruberová (1946–2021), Slovak soprano.
- Berthold Grünfeld (1932–2007), Norwegian psychiatrist and professor.

== H ==
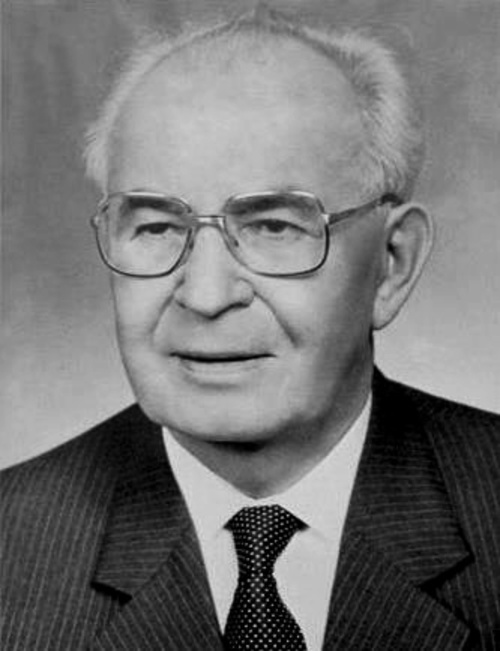
Gustáv Husák, President of Czechoslovakia (1975–1989)

- Zuzana Haasová (born 1981), actress and singer.
- Michal Habai (born 1985), Slovak football player.
- Magdaléna Hajóssyová (born 1946), Slovak soprano.
- Jaroslav Halák (born 1985), Slovak ice hockey player.
- Pavol Hammel (born 1948), Slovak musician, singer and producer.
- Jack Martin Händler (1947–2023), Slovak conductor and violinist.
- Lukáš Haraslín (born 1996), Slovak football player.
- František Havránek (1923–2011), Czech football player.
- Erzsébet Házy (1929–1982), Hungarian opera singer.
- Antonie Hegerlíková (1923–2012), Czech actress, whose career in film, television and theater endured for more than seventy years.
- Karin Haydu (1977), Slovak actress
- Hana Hegerová (1931–2021), Slovak singer and actress.
- Dana Herrmannová (1931–2024), Slovak television presenter.
- Andrej Hesek (born 1981), Slovak football player.
- Monika Hilmerová (born 1974), Slovak actress.
- Arnošt Hložek (1929–2013), Slovak football player.
- Andrej Hodek (born 1981), Slovak football player.
- Ludwig von Höhnel (1857–1942), Austrian explorer.
- Martin Hojsík (born 1977), Slovak activist, an environmental expert and a politician.
- Michaela Hončová (born 1992), Slovak tennis player.
- Olga Horak (1926–2024), Australian survivor of the Holocaust; author.
- Katarína Horáková (born 1934), university biology professor.
- Simona Houda-Šaturová, Slovak classical soprano.
- Lukas Hradecky (born 1989), Finnish football player.
- Michal Hrazdílek (born 1995), Slovak football player.
- Dominik Hrbatý (born 1978), Slovak tennis player.
- Ivan Hrdlička (born 1943), Slovak football player.
- Libor Hrdlička (born 1986), Slovak football player.
- Martin Hromkovič (born 1982), Slovak football player.
- Ivan Hrušovský (1927–2001), Slovak composer and educator.
- Jana Hubinská (born 1964), Slovak film and stage actress.
- Dávid Hudák (born 1993), Slovak football player.
- Ladislav Hudec (born 1957), Slovak football player.
- Johann Nepomuk Hummel (1778–1837), Austrian composer and pianist.
- Gustáv Husák (1913–1991), Slovak politician.
- Janette Husárová (born 1974), Slovak tennis player.
- Max Hussarek von Heinlein (1865–1935), Austrian statesman.
- Michal Hvorecký (born 1976), Slovak author.

== I ==
- Alexander Ilečko (1937–2023), sculptor.
- Dávid Ivan (born 1995), Slovak football player.

== J ==
- Adéla Jergová (born 2003), Slovak singer-songwriter and dancer.
- Miroslava Jánošíková (born 1969), Czech Olympic judoka.
- Miloš Janoušek (1952–2023), Slovak folk singer and music publicist.
- Dušan Jarjabek (born 1953), Slovak singer and politician.
- Tomáš Janovic (1937–2023), Slovak writer
- Zora Jaurová (born 1973), Slovak politician.
- János Jeszenák (1800–1849), Hungarian politician, noble, Inspector of the Lutheran Diocese of Cisdanubia.
- Archduke Joseph Karl of Austria (1833–1905), Austrian archduke.
- Lenka Juríková (born 1990), Slovak tennis player.
- Martin Jurkemik (born 1989), Slovak football player.
- Eugen Jurzyca (born 1958), Slovak economist and politician.

== K ==
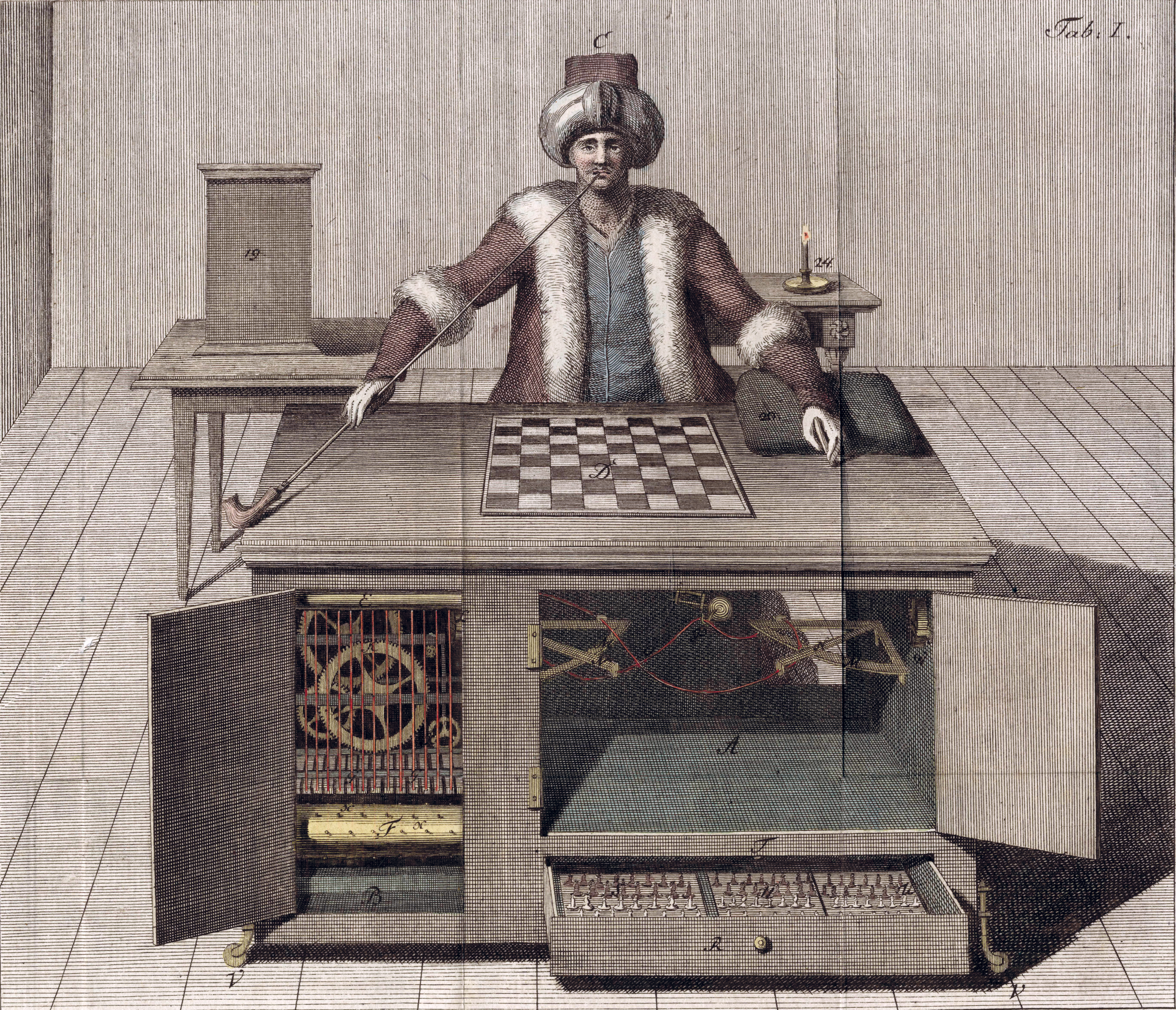
The Turk by Wolfgang von Kempelen

- Juraj Kakaš (born 1971), Slovak football player.
- Erik Kaliňák (born 1991), Slovak politician.
- Robert Kaliňák (born 1971), Slovak politician.
- Andrej Karpathy (born 1986), Slovak-Canadian computer scientist
- Milan Karvaš (1932–2024), Slovak chemist
- Dušan Keketi (born 1951), Slovak football player.
- Wolfgang von Kempelen (1734–1804), Hungarian inventor.
- Vladimír Kinder (born 1969), Slovak football player.
- József Kiss de Elemér et Ittebe (1896–1918) World War I flying ace of the Austro-Hungarian Empire.
- Jana Kiššová (born 1974), Slovak manager and former politician.
- Livia Klausová (born 1943), Slovak-born Czech economist.
- Ivo Klec (born 1980), Slovak tennis player.
- Martin Kližan (born 1989), Slovak tennis player.
- Gejza Kocsis (1910–1958), Czechoslovak-Hungarian football player.
- Kristián Kolčák (born 1990), Slovak football player.
- Ignác Kolisch (1837–1889), Hungarian banker and chess master.
- Boris Kollár (born 1965), Slovak businessman and politician.
- Mária Korenčiová (born 1989), Slovak football player.
- Tomáš Košický (born 1986), Slovak goalkeeper.
- Juraj Kotula (born 1995), Slovak football player.
- Michal Kovačič (born 1983), Slovak journalist
- Emília Kováčová (1931–2020), Slovak economist and professor of employment and social development at the University of Economics in Bratislava.
- Martin Kovaľ (born 1999), Slovak football player.
- Jozef Kovalík (born 1992), Slovak tennis player.
- Sergej Kozlík (born 1950), Slovak politician.
- Samuel Kozlovský (born 1999), Slovak football player.
- Denisa Krajčovičová (born 1968), Slovak tennis player.
- Roman Kratochvíl (born 1974), Slovak football player.
- Karl Kreibich (1867–1949), German politician in the First Czechoslovak Republic.
- Marek Krejčí (1980–2007), Slovak football player.
- Ondrej Krištofík (born 1966), Slovak football player.
- Petra Krištúfková (born 1977), Slovak politician.
- Eva Krížiková (1934–2020), Slovak film and stage actress.
- Adriana Krnáčová (born 1965), Czech businesswoman and politician.
- Ján Krošlák (born 1974), Slovak tennis player.
- Ján Kubiš (born 1952), Slovak politician.
- Karol Kučera (born 1974), Slovak tennis player.
- Kristína Kučová (born 1990), Slovak tennis player.
- Zuzana Kučová (born 1982), Slovak tennis player.
- Jana Kulan (born 1987), Slovak-born Azerbaijani volleyball player.
- Tatiana Kulíšková (born 1961), Slovak actress and television presenter.
- Jozef Kundlák (born 1956), Slovak tenor.
- Ľubomíra Kurhajcová (born 1983), Slovak tennis player.
- Johann Sigismund Kusser (1660–1727), composer born in the Kingdom of Hungary who was active in Germany, France, and Ireland.
- Miroslav Kusý (1931–2019), Slovak political scientist and politician.

== L ==
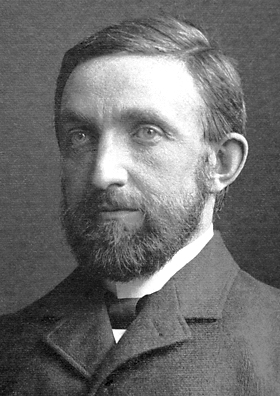
Philipp Lenard, physicist. Nobel Prize winner (1905)

- Rudolf Laban (1879–1958), Hungarian dance artist and theorist.
- Matúš Lacko (born 1987), Slovak football player.
- Adam Laczkó (born 1997), Slovak football player.
- Yehoshua Lakner (1924–2003), Israeli composer.
- Richard Lásik (born 1992), Slovak football player.
- Samuel Lavrinčík (born 2001), Slovak football player.
- Ján Lehotský (born 1947), Slovak composer.
- Philipp Lenard (1862–1947), Hungarian physicist, winner of the Nobel Prize for Physics in 1905, member of the Hungarian Academy of Sciences.
- Theodor von Lerch (1869–1945), Major General in the Austro-Hungarian Army, and a pioneer alpine ski instructor in Japan.
- Ľuba Lesná (born 1954), contemporary Slovak investigative journalist, filmmaker, novelist, and playwright.
- Andrea Letanovská (born 1969), Slovak physician and politician.
- Lukáš Letenay (born 2001), Slovak football player.
- Ivan Lexa (born 1961), Slovak Secret Service from 1995 to 1998.
- Juraj Lexmann (born 1941–2025), Slovak musicologist and composer.
- Miriam Lexmann (born 1972), Slovak politician.
- Imi Lichtenfeld (1910–1998), Hungarian-Jewish Israeli martial artist; founded the Krav Maga self-defense system.
- Zuzana Licko (born 1960), American typeface designer.
- Ivan Lietava (born 1983), Slovak football player.
- Daniel Lipšic (born 1973), Slovak politician and jurist.
- Johanna Loisinger (1865–1951), Austrian opera singer.
- Viliam Loviska (born 1964), Slovak sculptor, painter, designer, educator and organiser of the cultural life.
- Štefan Luby (born 1941), Slovak physicist.
- Martina Lubyová (1967–2023), Slovak economist and politician.
- Malte Ludin (born 1942), German filmmaker.
- Roman Luknár (born 1965), Slovak actor.

== M ==
- Peter Machajdík (born 1961), Slovak composer of classical music.
- Alois Machatschek (1928–2014), Austrian architect, architectural historian, university professor and architectural preservationist.
- Marek Maďarič (born 1966), Slovak politician.
- Rezső Máder (1856–1940), conductor and composer
- Kamila Magálová (born 1950), Slovak film and stage actress, singer, and entrepreneur.
- Štefan Maixner (born 1968), Slovak football player.
- Tomáš Majtán (born 1991), Slovak football player.
- Róbert Mak (born 1991), Slovak football player.
- Iveta Malachovská (born 1965), Slovak television presenter and actress.
- Herbert Thomas Mandl (1926–2007), Czechoslovak-German-Jewish author, concert violinist, philosopher and inventor.
- Carlos Mardel (1695–1763), Hungarian-Portuguese military officer, engineer, and architect.
- Karol Marko (born 1966), Slovak football player.
- Ján Markoš (born 1985), Slovak author and chess player.
- Martin Maroši (born 1988), Slovak football player.
- Andrej Martin (born 1989), Slovak tennis player.
- Daniel Filip Mašulovič (born 1998), Slovak football player.
- Róbert Matejka (born 1996), Slovak football player.
- Štefan Matlák (1934–2003), Slovak football player.
- Ivan Matušík (1930–2022), Slovak architect.
- Zuzana Mauréry (born 1968), Slovak actress working in film, television, and on stage, as well as a musical singer.
- Johann Kaspar Mertz (1806–1856), Austrian composer.
- Ľubomír Meszároš (born 1979), Slovak football player.
- Kristína Michalaková (born 1985), Slovak tennis player.
- Marián Miezga (born 1974), Slovak actor.
- Jozef Mihál (born 1965), Slovak politician and tax consultant.
- Kristián Mihálek (born 2000), Slovak football player.
- Viktor Miklós (born 1993), Slovak football player.
- Pavel Mikšík (born 1943), Slovak architect and designer.
- Roman Mikulec (born 1972), Slovak politician and former soldier, Interior Minister of Slovakia from March 2020.
- Martin Mikulič (born 1985), Slovak football player.
- Natália Milanová (born 1982), Slovak politician.
- Pavol Minárik (1957–2018), Slovak politician.
- Ivan Mistrík (1935–1982), Slovak actor.
- Monika Mockovčáková (born 1971), Slovak classical pianist.
- Pavol Molnár (1936–2021), Slovak football player.
- Diana Mórová (born 1970), Slovak film and stage actress.
- Gustáv Mráz (born 1934), Slovak football player.
- Peter Mráz (born 1975), Slovak football player.
- Gustáv Murín (born 1959), Slovak writer
- Peter Mutkovič (born 1945), Slovak football player.

== N ==
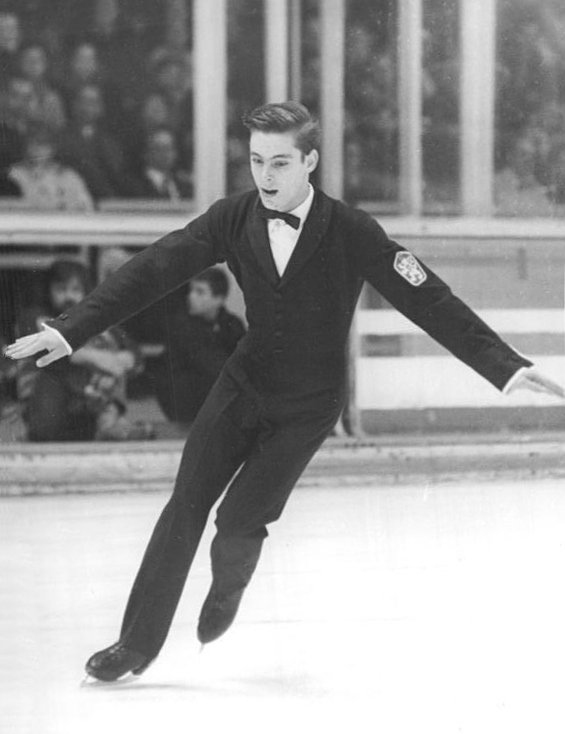
Ondrej Nepela

- Richard Nagy (born 2000), Slovak football player.
- Ondrej Nepela (1951–1989), Slovak figure skater.
- Hans Neusidler (1508–1563), German composer and lutenist of the Renaissance.
- Lucia Ďuriš Nicholsonová (born 1976), Slovak politician.
- Branislav Niňaj (born 1993), Slovak football player.
- Juraj Nvota (born 1954), Slovak actor and film director.

== O ==
- Adam Obert (born 2002), Slovak football player.
- Adam Friedrich Oeser (1717–1799), German painter and sculptor.
- Juraj Okoličány (1943–2008), Czechoslovak ice hockey referee and a Slovak ice hockey administrator.
- Lucia Ondrušová (born 1988), Slovak football player.
- Vladimir Oravsky (born 1947), Slovak-Swedish author and film director.
- Ľuba Orgonášová (born 1961), Slovak operatic soprano.
- Peter Osuský (born 1953), Slovak politician.

== P ==
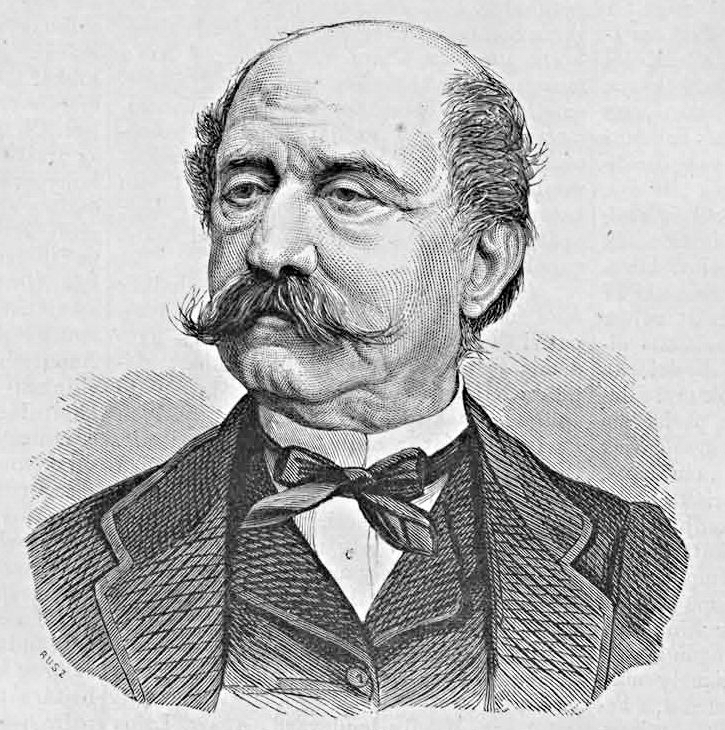
Petar Pejačević, Minister of Croatian Affairs (1871–1876) in the Kingdom of Hungary

- Lukáš Parízek (born 1986), Slovak politician.
- Tatiana Pauhofová (born 1983), Slovak actress.
- Lukáš Pauschek (born 1992), Slovak football player.
- Pavol Pavlis (born 1961), Slovak politician.
- Ivan Pecha (born 1986), Slovak football player.
- Petar Pejačević (1804–1887), Croatian politician.
- Andrej Pernecký (born 1991), Slovak football player.
- Silvia Petöová (1968–2019), Slovak actress.
- Juraj Piroska (born 1987), Slovak football player.
- Vladimír Pláteník (born 1976), Slovak tennis player.
- Lucia Plaváková (born 1982), Slovak politician
- Ján Počiatek (born 1970), Slovak politician.
- Peter Podhradský (born 1979), Slovak ice hockey player.
- Julius Podlipny (1898–1991), Slovak and Romanian painter.
- Paul Podolay (born 1946), German politician.
- Elena Podzámska (born 1972), Slovak actress.
- Vladimír Pončák (born 1982), Slovak football player.
- Andrej Porázik (born 1977), Slovak football player.
- Tomáš Porubský (1914–1973), Slovak football player.
- Dorota Pospíšilová (born 1930), Slovak winemaker and viticulturist.
- Oliver Práznovský (born 1991), Slovak football player.
- Radoslav Procházka (born 1972), Slovak lawyer, former politician and former leader of the political party Sieť.

== R ==
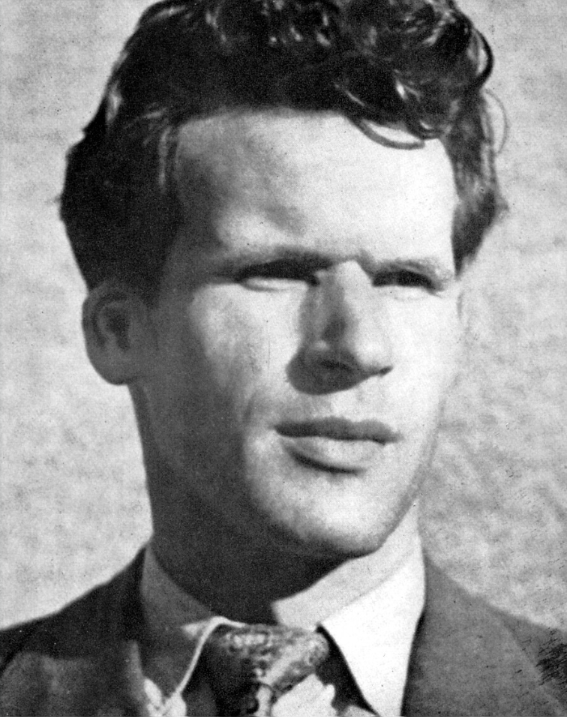
Milan_Rúfus, Slovak poet, 1928 - 2009

- Iveta Radičová (born 1956), Slovak politician.
- Ľudovít Rado (1914–1992), Slovak football player.
- Ida Rapaičová (born 1943), Slovak actress and former politician.
- Jozef Ráž (born 1979), politician
- Rudolf Rehák (born 1965), Slovak football player.
- Stanislava Repar (born 1960), Slovak writer
- Heinrich Reinhardt (1865–1922), Austrian composer.
- Bystrík Režucha (1935–2012), Slovak conductor.
- Lukas Ridgeston (born 1974), Slovak actor and director.
- Marek Rigo (born 1997), Slovak football player.
- Dara Rolins (born 1972), Slovak recording artist and entrepreneur.
- Yossele Rosenblatt (1882–1933), Ukrainian-born chazzan and composer.
- Tatiana Rosová (born 1961), Slovak sociologist and politician.
- Milan Rufus (1928–2009), Slovak poet, essayist, children's writer and academic.
- Viktor Rumpelmayer (1830–1885), Austro-Hungarian architect.
- Adam Ružička (born 1999), Slovak ice hockey player.
- Jakub Rybárik (born 1986), Slovak actor.

== S ==
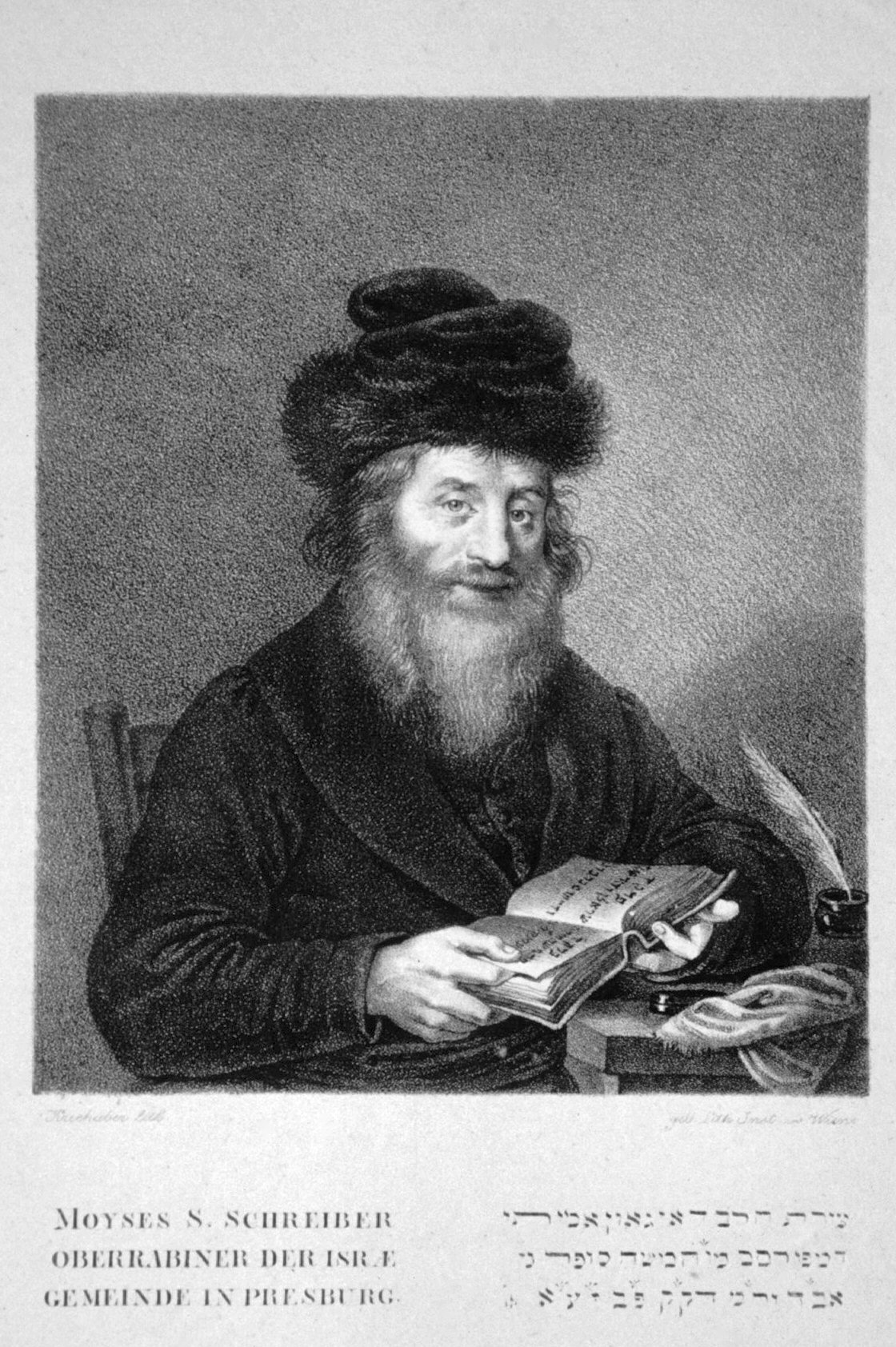
Orthodox Rabbi Chatam Sofer, buried in Bratislava

- Patrik Sabo (born 1993), Slovak football player.
- Jozef Sabovčík (born 1963), Slovak figure skater.
- Pavol Šajgalík (born 1955), Slovak physicist
- Pavol Šajgalík (born 1964), Roman Catholic Bishop
- Eva Sakálová (born 1985), Slovak stage and television actress.
- Július Satinský (1941–2002), Slovak author and actor.
- Magda Šaturová (1929–2016), Slovak translator
- Helmut Schiff (1918–1982), Austrian composer and music educator.
- Franz Schmidt (1874–1939), Austro-Hungarian composer.
- Brigita Schmögnerová (born 1947), Slovak economist and politician.
- Ivan Schranz (born 1993), Slovak football player.
- Carl Franz Anton Ritter von Schreibers (1775–1852), Austrian naturalist.
- Andrej Šeban (born 1962), Slovak jazz fusion musician, composer, producer, studio guitarist, and instructor.
- František Šebej (born 1947), Slovak politician and academic.
- Filip Šebo (born 1984), Slovak football player.
- Pavol Sedlák (born 1979), Slovak football player.
- Samuel Šefčík (born 1996), Slovak football player.
- Maroš Šefčovič (born 1966), Slovak diplomat and politician.
- Johann Andreas Segner (1704–1777), German physicist.
- Branislav Sekáč (born 1979), Slovak tennis player.
- Marek Semjan (born 1987), Slovak tennis player.
- Michal Šimečka (born 1984), Slovak politician, journalist and researcher who has served as Vice President of the European Parliament.
- Ester Šimerová-Martinčeková (born 1907), Slovak painter
- Ivan Šimko (born 1955), Slovak politician.
- Tomáš Šimkovič (born 1987), Slovak football player.
- Martina Schindlerová (born 1988), Slovak singer
- Viliam Široký (1902–1971), Czechoslovakia politician.
- Radovan Sloboda (born 1982), Slovak professional ice hockey player.
- Samuel Benjamin Sofer (1815–1871), Rabbi of Bratislava.
- Shimon Sofer (1820–1883), Austrian Orthodox Jewish rabbi.
- Dominik Špiriak (born 1999), Slovak football player.
- Majk Spirit (born 1984), Slovak rapper.
- Ivan Šramko, (born 1957), Governor of the National Bank of Slovakia (2005–2010)
- Rebecca Šramková (born 1996), Slovak tennis player.
- Ľubomír Stankovský (1951–2024), Slovak pop rock musician
- Anton Šťastný (born 1959), Slovak ice hockey player.
- Peter Šťastný (born 1956), Slovak ice hockey player and politician.
- Pavol Steiner (1908–1969), Czechoslovak Olympic water polo player, swimmer, and cardiac surgeon.
- Eugene Sternberg (1915–2005), Hungarian-born American architect.
- Wilhelm Stiassny (1842–1910), Austrian architect.
- Ludwig Straus (1835–1899) Austrian violinist.
- Milan Strelec (born 1972), Slovak football player.
- Diana Štrofová (born 1973), Slovak politician
- Peter Struhár (born 1984), Slovak football player.
- Katarína Studeníková (born 1972), Slovak tennis player.
- Zdena Studenková (born 1954), Slovak film and stage actress, and a musical theater singer.
- Tomáš Stúpala (born 1966), Slovak football player.
- Boris Susko (born 1970), Slovak politician.
- Ladislav Švarc (born 1978), Slovak tennis player.
- Kristína Svarinská (born 1989), Slovak actress and dubbing artist.
- Otto Szabó (born 1981), Slovak football player.

== T ==
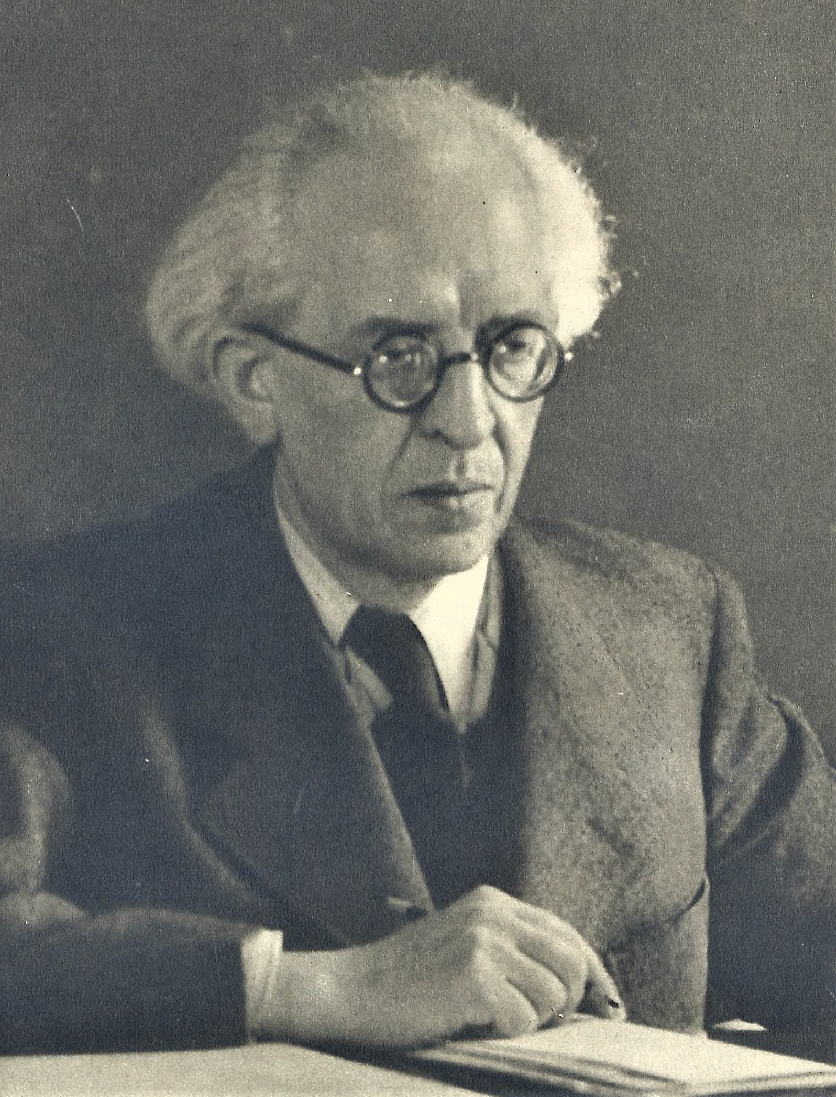
Vojtech Tuka

- Romana Tabak (born 1991), Slovak politician and former professional tennis player.
- Peter Tatár (born 1953), Slovak parliament.
- Alfred Tauber (1866–1942), Austrian mathematician.
- Abraham Mendel Theben (1730–1768), Hungarian the Jewish community in the Kingdom of Hungary.
- Siegfried Theiß (1882–1963), Austrian architect.
- Yvonne Tobis (born 1948), Israeli Olympic swimmer.
- Samuel Tomeček (born 1986), Slovak singer.
- Mário Tóth (born 1995), Slovak football player.
- Katarína Tóthová (born 1940), Slovak former Deputy Prime Minister of Slovakia and 1st Minister of Justice of Slovakia and a long term Member of National Council of the Slovak Republic representing the People's Party – Movement for a Democratic Slovakia.
- Martin Trnovský (born 2000), Slovak football player.
- Vojtech Tuka (1880–1946), Slovak prime minister and minister of foreign affairs of the Slovak Republic (1939–1945), war criminal.
- Lenka Tvarošková (born 1982), Slovak tennis player.
- Tibor Ág, Hungarian folk music researcher.

== U ==
- Ferdinand Udvardy (1895–1945), Hungarian conscript.
- Jenő Uhlyárik (1893–1974), Hungarian fencing-master.

== V ==
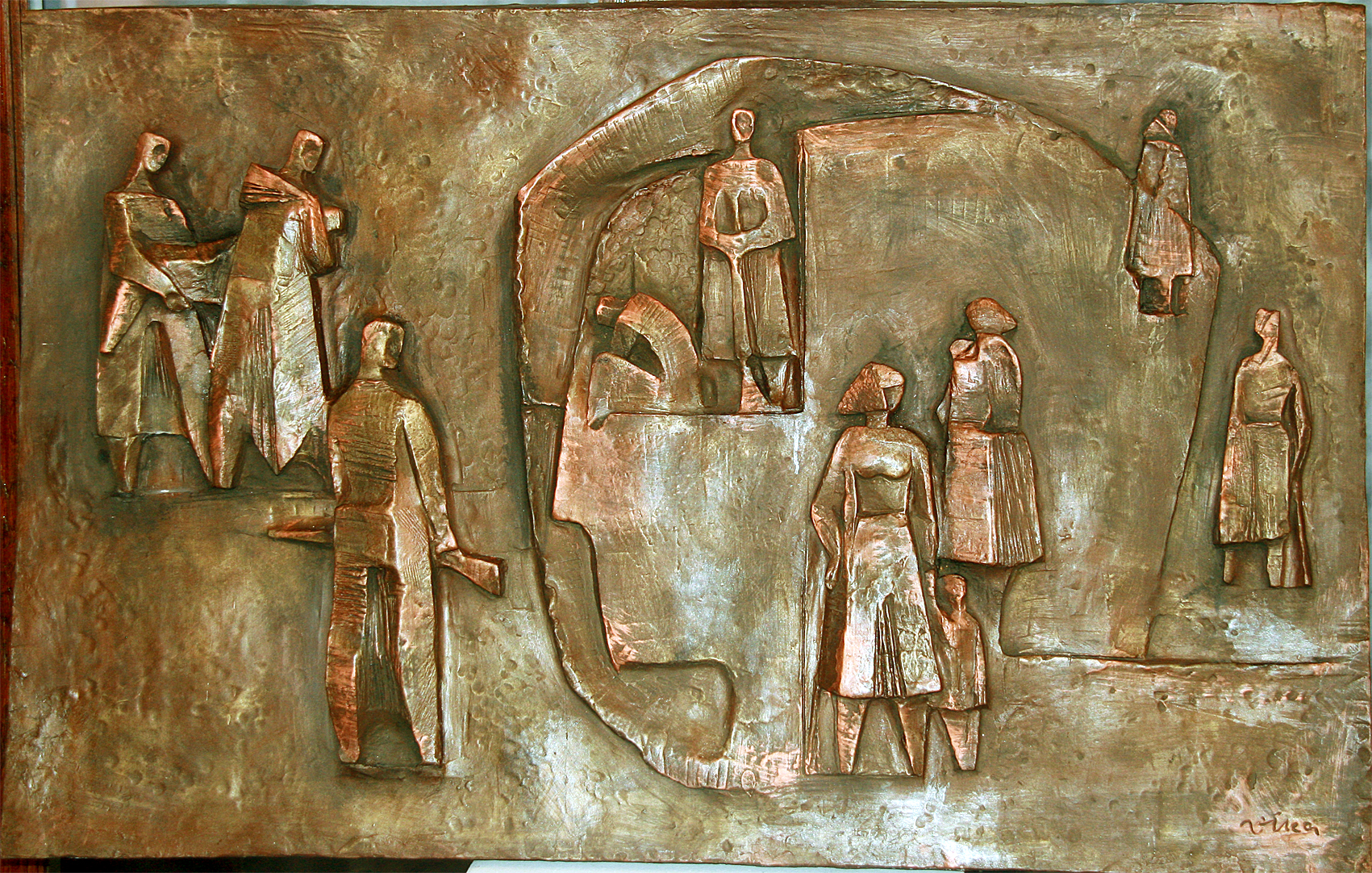
Alexander Vika, sculptor

- Jozef Valachovič (born 1975), Slovak football player.
- Juraj Valčuha (born 1976), Slovak conductor.
- Martin Valihora (born 1976), Slovak musician, jazz and rock drummer.
- Alexander Vencel (born 1967), Slovak football player.
- Ingrid Veninger (born 1968), actress, writer, director, producer, and film professor who later immigrated to Canada.
- Alexander Vika (1933–2025), sculptor
- Jan Vilcek (born 1933), professor in the Department of Microbiology at the NYU School of Medicine.
- Róbert Vittek (born 1982), Slovak football player.
- Gabriela Voleková (born 1981), Slovak tennis player.
- Viktor Vondryska (born 2001), Slovak football player.
- Igor Vrablic (born 1965), Slovak football player.

== W ==
- Vladimír Weiss (footballer, born 1964) (born 1964), Slovak football player.
- Vladimír Weiss (footballer, born 1989) (born 1989), Slovak football player.
- Gisela Werbezirk (1875–1956), Austrian-Hungarian actress.
- Miroslav Wlachovský (born 1970), Slovak diplomat.
- Jarmila Wolfe (born 1987), Slovak tennis player.

== Z ==
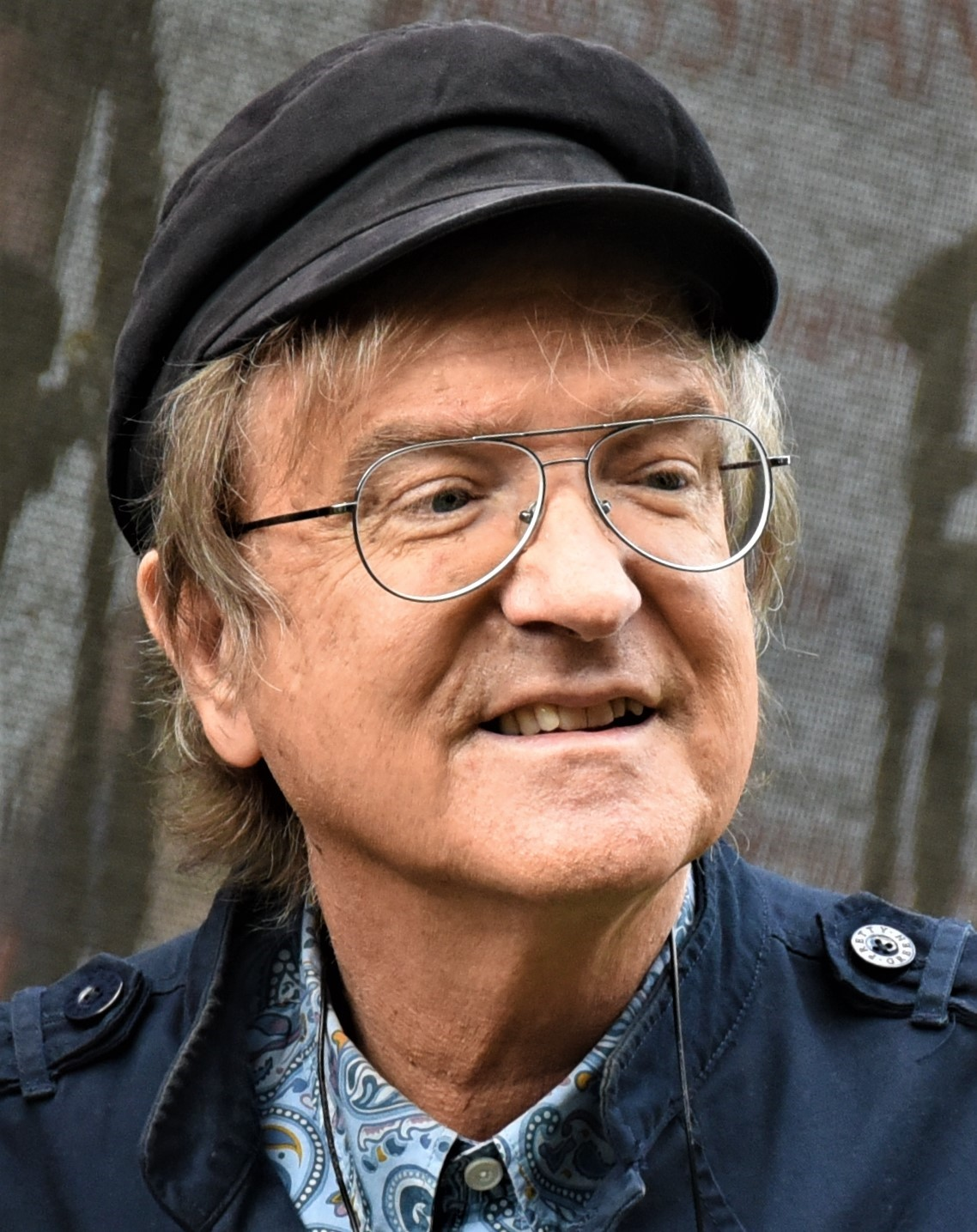
Miroslav Žbirka, pop star

- Peter Zajac (born 1946), Slovak literary critic and politician.
- Rudolf Zajac (born 1951), Slovak former Minister of Health.
- Miroslav Žbirka (1952–2021), Slovak pop and rock singer and songwriter.
- Ilja Zeljenka (1932–2007), Slovak composer.
- Marián Zeman (born 1974), Slovak football player.
- Hanna Zemer (1925–2003), Israeli journalist.
- József Zichy (1841–1924), Hungarian politician.
- Jana Žitňanská (born 1973), Slovak politician.
- Lucia Žitňanská (born 1964), Slovak politician.
- Ján Zlocha (1942–2013), Slovak football player.
- Ľudovít Zlocha (born 1945), Slovak football player.
- Radka Zrubáková (born 1970), Slovak tennis player.
- Tibor Zsitvay (1884–1969), Hungarian politician and jurist.
- Veronika Zuzulová (born 1984), Slovak alpine skier.
- Zuzana Zvolenská (born 1972), Slovak lawyer and politician.
- Ján Zvonár (1951–2023), Slovak physician and politician.
