= Imbriogon =

Archaeological site in Turkey

Coordinates: 36°25′41″N 33°56′57″E

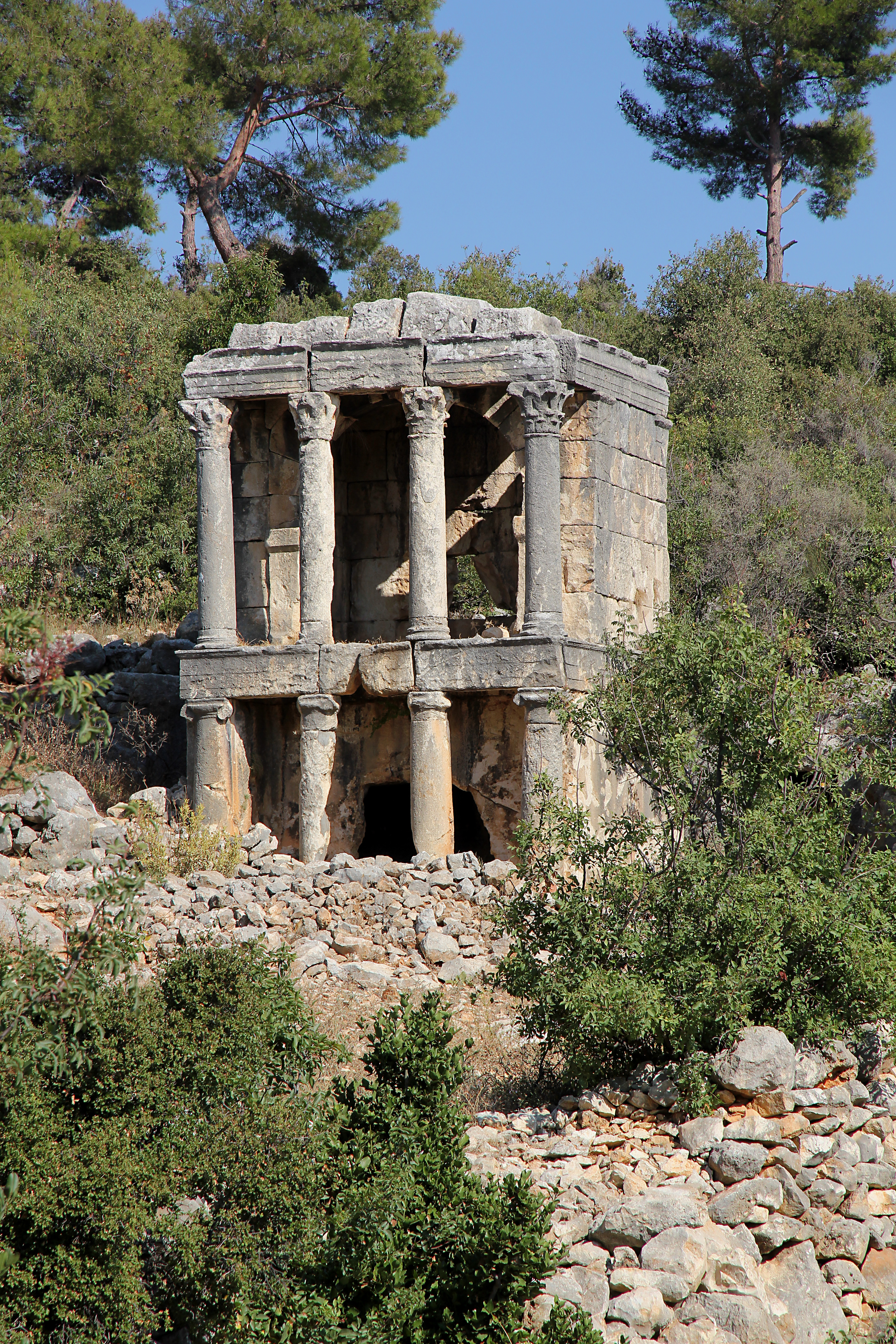
Two-story temple-like Roman mausoleum

Imbriogon was an ancient place in Cilicia Trachea, whose modern name is Demircili (formerly Dösene) in Silifke district, in Mersin province, Turkey. It lay on the road from Seleukia in the Kalykadnos to Diocaesarea (Uzuncaburç), about 8 kilometres north of Seleukia.

Imbrogion was probably founded in the 2nd century AD, as a summer residence for wealthy citizens of Seleukia. Since no remains from Christian times have been found, it is assumed that it was abandoned shortly after this. Seven house and temple graves which all date to the second and third centuries AD are the main surviving structures. Some of these are two stories high; the tallest are 7.5 metres in height. One two-story temple tomb (pictured above) has Ionic columns in a 2.3 metre high lower story and Corinthian capitals in a 2.9 metre high upper story. Inside there were three surviving sarcophagi, no longer present. On the acropolis hill, there are some remains of the ancient city, including a Roman bath house with a mosaic floor showing the sea god and a Greek inscription. There are also the remains of the columns of two Heroa, one of which was dedicated to the family of Anglus, according to an inscription on a column.

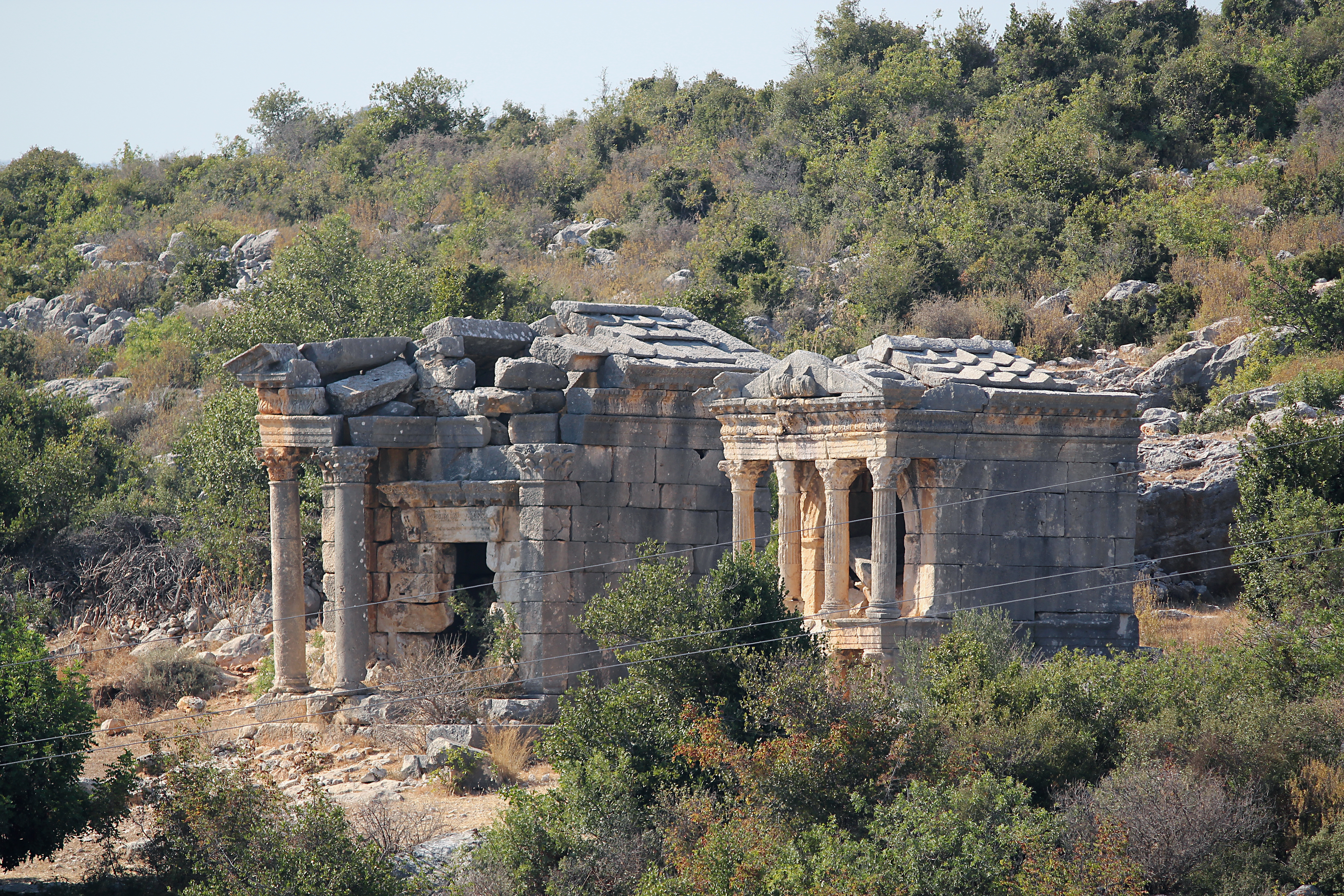
Two temple tombs

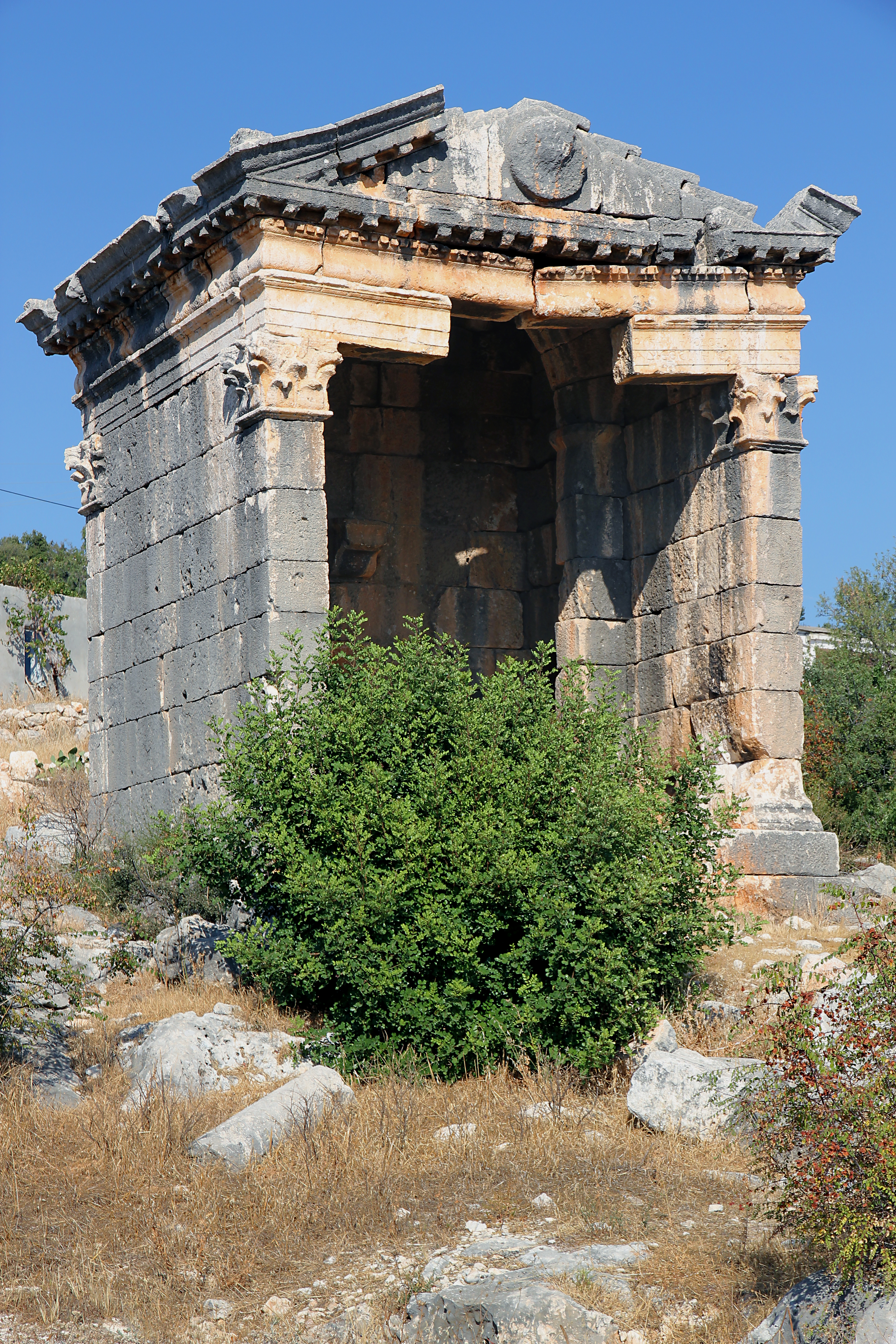
House tomb

== Bibliography ==
- Alois Machatschek, "Die Grabtempel von Dösene im Rauhen Kilikien." Mélanges Mansel, Ankara 1974 pp. 251–261
- Christof Berns, ΣΉΜΑΤΑ Untersuchungen zu den Grab- und Memorialbauten des späten Hellenismus und der frühen Kaiserzeit in Kleinasien. Universität zu Köln 1996 PDF
- Friedrich Hild, Hansgerd Hellenkemper: "Kilikien und Isaurien." Tabula Imperii Byzantini Vol. 5. Verlag der Österreichischen Akademie der Wissenschaften, Wien 1990, ISBN 3-7001-1811-2, pp. 275
