= Karl Kreibich =

Karl Kreibich may refer to

- Karl Kreibich (dermatologist)
- Karl Kreibich (politician, born 1867)
- Karl Kreibich (politician, born 1883)
