= Demircili, Silifke =

Demircili
- Neighbourhood
- Location in Turkey
- Coordinates: 36°26′N 33°57′E
- Country: Turkey
- Province: Mersin
- District: Silifke
- Elevation: 380 m (1,250 ft)
- Population (2022): 385
- Time zone: UTC+3 (TRT)
- Postal code: 33940
- Area code: 0324

Demircili (ancient Imbriogon) is a neighbourhood in the municipality and district of Silifke, Mersin Province, Turkey. Its population is 385 (2022). It is situated on the southern slopes of the Taurus Mountains. The distance to Silifke is 10 kilometres (6.2 mi) and to Mersin is 91 kilometres (57 mi). There are Roman ruins, some of which are situated along the road to the north, mostly mausoleums of wealthy Roman citizens of Seleucia who had summer residences in Demircili (then Imbriogon), as many Silifke residents still do today. The main economic activity is agriculture. Olives and pistachios are the most pronounced crops.
