= Arthur-Schnitzler-Hof =

Residential block in Vienna, Austria

Coordinates: 48.232344°N 16.353214°E

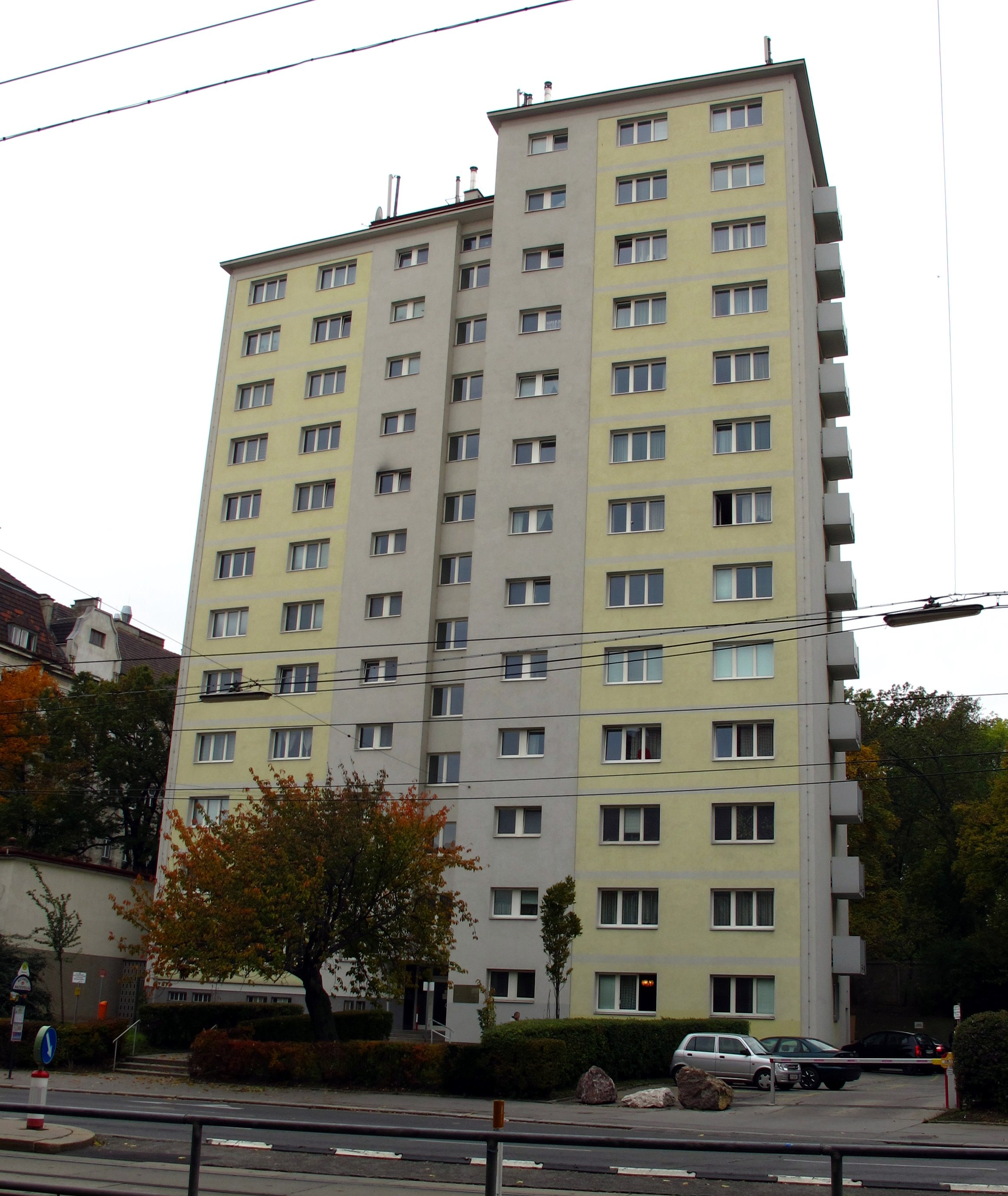

The Arthur-Schnitzler-Hof is a residential tower block in Döbling (City District 19), a quarter on the northern side of central Vienna. It was built between 1959 and 1960, according to plans produced by the architects Michel Engelhart and Alois Machatschek. It comprises 47 residential apartments.

== Historical context ==
In the late 1950s, after seven Nazi years followed by a decade of Soviet occupation, Vienna suffered from an acute housing shortage. The answer was a municipal building programme that would set the pattern for subsequent decades. Using "Plattenbau" construction, it became possible to construct residential apartment complexes taller and wider than ever before, mainly based on large simple block shaped structures. New regulations meant that new apartments all now came with a built-in bathroom and toilet, while the minimum floor space required was increased from 42 to 55 square meters. Constructed between 1959 and 1960, the Arthur-Schnitzler-Hof was an early example, in Austria, of the new approach.

== History of the site ==
The Arthur-Schnitzler-Hof was built on what had been the south-eastern corner of the Währinger Jewish cemetery. In 1942 the remaining Jewish community in Vienna was dispossessed and the entire cemetery passed into the control of the city authorities. On its Döblinger High Street side between 1,500 and 2,000 graves were destroyed as part of a project to construct a (never completed) fire service reservoir. The community attempted to gather the physical remains and rebury them in a large mass grave in the city's main cemetery on the south side of Vienna. Assurances were provided by the city authorities that the destroyed portion of the old Währinger cemetery would never be built on, but on 28 March 1958 the site was nevertheless redesignated to make it available for building construction.

== Construction ==
The first three residential tower blocks in Döbling were constructed in 1958 and 1959 at the Helmut-Qualtinger-Hof development, using plans drawn up by Hermann Kutschera. Taking their inspiration from this, Michel Engelhart and Alois Machatschek planned a significantly taller, 13 floor, building on the gently sloping site for the Arthur Schnitzler-Hof. The structure comprises two blocks, set on slightly different levels, linked by a shared encased stairwell. The architects varied the levels of the buildings by half a floor, and specified a simple exterior colour scheme using wide columns of yellow and grey. The northern and southern sides featured small concrete balconies, while the casing for the stairwell is slightly inset from the rest of the facade.

To the left of the entrance is the little "Horseman" ("Reiter") fountain, designed by Franz Fischer.

== The name ==
The development takes its name from the distinguished physician-dramatist-author Arthur Schnitzler (1862-1931).

== Renovation ==
A renovation programme undertaken in 2004/2005 involved replacing the doors and windows and major roof repairs. The application of modern exterior wall insulation permanently reduced heating costs and carbon emission costs.
