= Erzsébet Dolník =

Slovak politician

Member of the National Council
- In office 15 October 2002 – 4 July 2006

Personal details
- Born: 13 May 1940 Bratislava, Slovak Republic
- Died: 21 April 2021 (aged 80)
- Party: Party of the Hungarian Community

Erzsébet Dolník (née Erzsébet Czirók 13 May 1940 in Bratislava – 12 April 2021) was a Slovak politician. She served as an MP of the National Council between 2002 - 2006, serving as a replacement for Árpád Duka-Zólyomi, who became a Member of the European Parliament. In 2011, she was stripped of Slovak citizenship after publicly admitting she applied for and received Hungarian citizenship in spite of double-nationality ban in effect in Slovakia. Dolník unsuccessfully tried to contest the matter at the European Court of Human Rights.
