= Rudolf Böhm =

German politician and businessman in the First Czechoslovak Republic

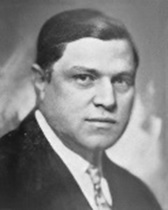

Senator of the National Assembly of the Czechoslovak Republic
- In office 1929–1933

Personal details
- Born: August 6, 1884; Kassa, Austria-Hungary
- Died: January 18, 1933 (aged 48); Bratislava, Czechoslovakia
- Political party: Provincial Christian-Socialist Party
- Occupation: Politician

Rudolf Böhm was an ethnic German politician and businessman in the First Czechoslovak Republic. Böhm was born in Košice on 6 August 1884. From the early 1920s, he was part of the Provincial Christian-Socialist Party leadership in Bratislava. He stood as candidate for the Senate in the 1925 Czechoslovak parliamentary election. He was elected to the Senate in the 1929 Czechoslovak parliamentary election. He died on 19 January 1933.
