= Tibor Ág =

- Born: April 13, 1928; Bratislava, Czechoslovakia
- Died: August 29, 2013 (aged 85); Nagymegyer, Slovakia
- Occupations: Folk music researcher, choirmaster, composer, music educator
- Organizations: Hungarian Academy of Arts, Hungarian Scout Association of Slovakia
- Known for: Folk song and ballad collection, Hungarian choral movement in Slovakia, scouting activities
- Notable work: Thousands of folk song collections, methodological publications, folk song contest organization

Tibor Ág (13 April 1928 – 29 August 2013) was a Hungarian-Slovak folk music researcher, choirmaster, composer and music educator. He was a member of the Hungarian Academy of Arts, member of the Hungarian Scout Association of Slovakia, honorary troop commander of the Arany János 23rd Arany Scout Troop in Nagymegyer.

== Career ==
Tibor Ág was born on 13 April 1928 in Bratislava. He studied musicology and humanities at the Comenius University in Bratislava. His interests and research were focused on folk music, i.e. folk song and ballad collection. He made his first two-week ethnographic collecting trip with András Takács, a folk dance collector, in the last week of December and the first week of January 1951. During their journey they followed the paths of Zoltán Kodály, János Manga and László Adalbert Arany folk song collectors from Zoborod, supplemented by Martos. András Takács later said of their journey, "Despite the hard experiences, the war, the evictions, the confiscations, the statelessness, we were welcomed by the common people, and this had a very positive influence on both of our professional lives." Tibor Ág became a member, later a leader and teacher of Hungarian art ensembles in Slovakia from 1953, and András Takács became a dance choreographer. In Easter 1952, he collected the living traditional heritage in the Bodrog and Ung regions of eastern Slovakia. Since 1967 the Csemadok Central Committee in Bratislava. He collected thousands of songs in the Hungarian-inhabited areas of Czechoslovakia, most of which are in the data archive of the Csemadok KB.

He also has a lot of his own collected music, but also lyrics, which are waiting to be matched with melodies. He lived and worked in Nagymegyer, and he was enthusiastic about processing his own collections.

He is a prominent leading figure in the Hungarian choral movement in Slovakia. In 1968, one year before the Hungary "Fly the Peacock... (Röpülj páva)" contest, he organised the nationwide folk song contest "Spring Wind Floods Water...", which is still alive today. There were years when more than 5,000 singer-performers were activated. His musical publications and studies have appeared in Irodalmi Szemle, A Hétben, Népművelás, Néprajzi Közlemények and in independent volumes.

He became involved in the scout movement in his hometown as a youth. In 1938 he took the scout oath. When the Hungarian scout movement in the Highlands was re-established, he became involved in scouting again, and in the early years of the re-establishment of the Hungarian Scout Association of Slovakia he contributed a great deal to the development of the musical requirements of the SZMCS rehearsal system and its practical teaching. For many years he was a columnist for the newspaper "Scout", and he has published two methodological publications (the "Come with me - pass it on! A handbook for traditional scouts and Who plays this? A selection from our folk children's play tradition), as well as being the curator, editor and producer of the songbook and cassette "A Scout's Song in the Air". In Nagymegyer, he helped to train the Scouts of Nagymegyer when the Scout Troop was re-established, and was the Scout Troop Commander from 1994-1998, later Honorary Troop Commander for life.

Tibor Ág died on 29 August 2013 in Nagymegyer.

== Main works ==
- Dalolj velünk (folk songs, 1953)
- 00 szlovákiai magyar népdal (100 Hungarian folk songs from Slovakia) (1957)
- Takács András-Ág Tibor: Folk dance and rhythm exercises; Pedagogické Nakladatelstvo, Bratislava, 1966
- Katalin Szakáll: The classical dance technique/Tibor Ág: Music reading and writing; Osvetovy ústav, Bratislava, 1973
- My Mother's Rose Tree (Palóc folk songs, 1974, 1995)
- Vétessék ki szóló szívem. Szlovákiai magyar népballadák :Let my solo heart be taken out. Hungarian folk ballads from Slovakia; published by Tibor Ág, Ferenc Sima; Gondolat-Madách, Bp.-Bratislava, 1979
- Ág Tibor-Jarábik Imre. A collection of songs and choirs / Zbornik piesni a zborov. For primary school grades 5-8; SPN, Bratislava, 1983
