= Štefan Luby =

Štefan Luby (born 6 May 1941, Bratislava) is a Slovak physicist and senior research fellow at the Slovak Academy of Sciences (SAS). He is doctor honoris causa of University of Salento, Italy, Slovak University of Technology in Bratislava, University of Constantine the Philosopher in Nitra, Slovakia, and Alexander Dubček University in Trenčín, Slovakia. He occupied positions of the director of the Institute of Physics of SAS for nine years and was the president of the SAS for fourteen years (1995–2009). He was the acting president of the All European Academies (federation of European academies of sciences and arts) and the acting president of the Central European Academy of Sciences and Arts. At present, he is a member of Senate and vice-president of the European Academy of Sciences and Arts with the headquarters in Salzburg. He has chaired the editorial board of the Slovak Encyclopaedia Beliana since 1992.

His research field covers physics of semiconductors and metals, electronic devices, laser technology, X-ray optics, nanoscience and nanotechnology. He published more than 400 scientific papers, 8 patents and 10 books of non-fiction literature.

== Biography ==
He spent his childhood in Liptovský Hrádok. He attended primary and secondary schools in Bratislava. He graduated at the Faculty of Electrotechnology of the Slovak University of Technology in Bratislava in 1963. He started his professional career at the Faculty of Natural Sciences of P. J. Šafárik University in Košice, Slovakia. In 1964 he joined the Slovak Academy of Sciences where he has been employed since then. He defended his DrSc. degree in 1982 and habilitated as the assistant professor at the Faculty of Mathematics and Physics of the Comenius University in Bratislava ten years later. In 1996 he obtained full professorship in physics at the Slovak University of Technology. He acts as a senior research fellow at the Institute of Physics of SAS. As the Humboldt fellow, he acted also as a visiting researcher or visiting professor at universities in Stuttgart and Bielefeld in Germany. He spent altogether four years at various foreign universities or research institutes (Germany, Italy, the United States, Japan, Greece and former Soviet Union).

== Family ==
Father Prof. JUDr. Štefan Luby (1910), DrSc. (†1976) is one of the founders of the Slovak juridical sciences, mother JUDr. Anna Lubyová (†1989) was a lawyer, spouse Dipl. Ing. Želmíra Lubyová (†1996) was a researcher in chemistry, elder daughter JUDr. Mgr. Martina Lubyová, PhD.(*1967) is at present the Director of the Institute for Forecasting of SAS, before she was the Head of the branch of International Labour Office, Geneve, in Moscow, younger daughter Mgr. Barbora Lubyová, PhD. (*1968) is at present a researcher at the Institute of Immunology and Microbiology of the Academy of Sciences of the Czech Republic in Prague, before she performed her research at the Johns Hopkins University in Baltimore.

== Awards, prizes ==
- Crystal Wing Awards, Slovakia, 2001,
- De scientia et humanitate optime meritis, Academy of Sciences, CR, 2001,
- Cross of the President of SR, 2003,
- Slovak state award Pribina Cross of the I. class, 2005,
- Gold medal of SAS 2006,
- Prize of the Club of Writers of Nonfiction Literature, 2006,
- Identification Code of Slovakia, Artem, 2013,
- Medals from Japan, Germany, etc.

== Publications ==
Most important scientific papers

- Luby, S. (1971). "Electron paramagnetic resonance and the ageing process in amorphous germanium". Thin Solid Films. 8 (5). Elsevier BV: 333–344. Bibcode:1971TSF.....8..333L. doi:10.1016/0040-6090(71)90081-2. ISSN 0040-6090.
- Kneppo, I.; Luby, Š.; Červenák, J. (1973). "Frequency dependence of the conductivity of amorphous germanium films between 20 Hz and 26 GHz". Thin Solid Films. 17 (1). Elsevier BV: 43–47. Bibcode:1973TSF....17...43K. doi:10.1016/0040-6090(73)90003-5. ISSN 0040-6090.
- Rapoš, M; Ružinský, M; Luby, S; Červenák, J (1976). "Dielectric properties of Me-CdTe-Me thin film structures". Thin Solid Films. 36 (1). Elsevier BV: 103–106. Bibcode:1976TSF....36..103R. doi:10.1016/0040-6090(76)90413-2. ISSN 0040-6090.
- Valentovič, D.; Červenák, J.; Luby, S.; Aldea, M. L.; Boţilǎ, T. (1979-11-16). "Some non-equilibrium phenomena in sputtered CdTe thin films". Physica Status Solidi A. 56 (1). Wiley: 341–347. Bibcode:1979PSSAR..56..341V. doi:10.1002/pssa.2210560138. ISSN 0031-8965.
- Luby, Ŝ.; Lobotka, P.; Bezák, V. (1980-08-16). "Electromigration behaviour and the lifetime of aluminum thin film conductors under superimposed dc and noise powers". Physica Status Solidi A. 60 (2). Wiley: 539–548. Bibcode:1980PSSAR..60..539L. doi:10.1002/pssa.2210600225. ISSN 0031-8965.
- Distribution of copper and silicon in Al Cu Si magnetron sputtered deposits. In: Proc. 6th Internat. Symp. High Purity Materials in Science and Technology, Dresden, 1985, C 19, p. 205 206.
- D'Anna, E.; Leggieri, G.; Luches, A.; Luby, S.; Zemek, J. (1989). "Pulsed laser synthesis of titanium silicides using a Q-Switched Nd: Glass laser". Applied Physics A: Solids and Surfaces. 48 (6). Springer Science and Business Media LLC: 503–507. Bibcode:1989ApPhA..48..503D. doi:10.1007/bf00617850. ISSN 0721-7250. S2CID 96063532.
- Luby, S.; Majková, E.; Lobotka, P.; Vávra, I.; Jergel, M.; Senderák, R.; Grňo, J. (1992). "Superconductivity of tungsten-silicon multilayers". Physica C: Superconductivity. 197 (1–2). Elsevier BV: 35–41. Bibcode:1992PhyC..197...35L. doi:10.1016/0921-4534(92)90230-a. ISSN 0921-4534.
- Ožvold, M.; Boháč, V.; Gašparík, V.; Leggieri, G.; Luby, Š.; Luches, A.; Majková, E.; Mrafko, P. (1995). "The optical band gap of semiconducting iron disilicide thin films". Thin Solid Films. 263 (1). Elsevier BV: 92–98. Bibcode:1995TSF...263...92O. doi:10.1016/0040-6090(95)06544-x. ISSN 0040-6090.
- Jergel, M.; Bochníček, Z.; Majková, E.; Senderák, R.; Luby, Š. (1996-08-12). "Thermally activated interface shift in the tungsten/silicon multilayers". Applied Physics Letters. 69 (7). AIP Publishing: 919–921. Bibcode:1996ApPhL..69..919J. doi:10.1063/1.116943. ISSN 0003-6951.
- Senderak, R.; Jergel, M.; Luby, S.; Majkova, E.; Holy, V.; Haindl, G.; Hamelmann, F.; Kleineberg, U.; Heinzmann, U. (1997). "Thermal stability of W_{1−x}Si_{x}/Si multilayers under rapid thermal annealing". Journal of Applied Physics. 81 (5). AIP Publishing: 2229–2235. Bibcode:1997JAP....81.2229S. doi:10.1063/1.364273. ISSN 0021-8979.
- Anopchenko, A; Jergel, M; Majková, E; Luby, Š; Holý, V; Aschentrup, A; Kolina, I; Cheol Lim, Y; Haindl, G; Kleineberg, U; Heinzmann, U (2001). "Effect of substrate heating and ion beam polishing on the interface quality in Mo/Si multilayers—X-ray comparative study". Physica B: Condensed Matter. 305 (1). Elsevier BV: 14–20. Bibcode:2001PhyB..305...14A. doi:10.1016/s0921-4526(01)00589-0. ISSN 0921-4526.
- Chushkin, Y.; Ulmeanu, M.; Luby, S.; Majkova, E.; Kostic, I.; Klang, P.; Holý, V.; Bochnı́ček, Z.; Giersig, M.; Hilgendorff, M.; Metzger, T. H. (2003). "Structural study of self-assembled Co nanoparticles". Journal of Applied Physics. 94 (12). AIP Publishing: 7743–7748. Bibcode:2003JAP....94.7743C. doi:10.1063/1.1627953. ISSN 0021-8979.
- Luby, S.; Majkova, E.; Caricato, A.P.; Fernandez, M.; Luches, A.; Frait, Z.; Fraitova, D.; Malych, R. (2004). "Pulsed excimer laser deposited Co- and Fe-based magnetic films for fast magnetic sensors". Journal of Magnetism and Magnetic Materials. 272–276. Elsevier BV: 1408–1409. Bibcode:2004JMMM..272.1408L. doi:10.1016/j.jmmm.2003.12.142. ISSN 0304-8853.
- Siffalovic, P.; Majkova, E.; Chitu, L.; Jergel, M.; Luby, S.; Satka, A.; Roth, S. V. (2007-11-20). "Self-assembly of iron oxide nanoparticles studied by time-resolved grazing-incidence small-angle x-ray scattering". Physical Review B. 76 (19) 195432. American Physical Society (APS). Bibcode:2007PhRvB..76s5432S. doi:10.1103/physrevb.76.195432. ISSN 1098-0121.
- Siffalovic, P.; Majkova, E.; Chitu, L.; Jergel, M.; Luby, S.; Capek, I.; Satka, A.; Timmann, A.; Roth, S. V. (2008). "Real-Time Tracking of Superparamagnetic Nanoparticle Self-Assembly" (PDF). Small. 4 (12). Wiley: 2222–2228. doi:10.1002/smll.200800353. ISSN 1613-6810. PMID 19003821.
- Siffalovic, Peter; Chitu, Livia; Majkova, Eva; Vegso, Karol; Jergel, Matej; Luby, Stefan; Capek, Ignac; Satka, Alexander; Maier, Guenther A.; Keckes, Jozef; Timmann, Andreas; Roth, Stephan V. (2010-04-20). "Kinetics of Nanoparticle Reassembly Mediated by UV-Photolysis of Surfactant". Langmuir. 26 (8). American Chemical Society (ACS): 5451–5455. doi:10.1021/la904636g. ISSN 0743-7463. PMID 20334400.
- Vegso, Karol; Siffalovic, Peter; Majkova, Eva; Jergel, Matej; Benkovicova, Monika; Kocsis, Teodora; Weis, Martin; Luby, Stefan; Nygård, Kim; Konovalov, Oleg (2012-07-06). "Nonequilibrium Phases of Nanoparticle Langmuir Films". Langmuir. 28 (28). American Chemical Society (ACS): 10409–10414. doi:10.1021/la301764t. ISSN 0743-7463. PMID 22724517. S2CID 11450749.
- Capone, S.; Manera, M. G.; Taurino, A.; Siciliano, P.; Rella, R.; Luby, S.; Benkovicova, M.; Siffalovic, P.; Majkova, E. (2014-01-21). "Fe_{3}O_{4}/γ-Fe_{2}O_{3} Nanoparticle Multilayers Deposited by the Langmuir–Blodgett Technique for Gas Sensors Application". Langmuir. 30 (4). American Chemical Society (ACS): 1190–1197. doi:10.1021/la404542u. ISSN 0743-7463. PMID 24410195. S2CID 44947892.

Non-fiction literature

- My Intellectuals I, VEDA, Publ. House of SAS, Bratislava 2003, 143 p., in Slovak.
- My Intellectuals II, VEDA, Publ. House of SAS, Bratislava 2004, 168p., in Slovak.
- Report from the Congress about Nothing, VEDA, Publ. House of SAS, Bratislava 2005, 157 s., in Slovak.
- My Intellectuals III, VEDA, Publ. House of SAS, Bratislava 2006, 163 p., in Slovak.
- Order vs. Chaos, VEDA, Publ. House of SAS, Bratislava 2008, 166 p., in Slovak.
- Fascination by Nobel, VEDA, Publ. House of SAS, Bratislava 2009, 166 p., in Slovak.
- Epigrams, Bon-mots and Maximas, illustr. by L. Hološka, VEDA, Publ. House of SAS, Bratislava 2011, 110 p., in Slovak.
- Legends and Inspirations, VEDA, Publ. House of SAS, Bratislava 2011, 151 p., in Slovak.
- Invectives and Insults, illustr. by L. Hološka, VEDA, Publ. House of SAS, Bratislava 2013, 128 p., in Slovak.
- Sitting under Thousand Years Old Rosebush, with M. Lubyova, VEDA, Publ. House

of SAS, Bratislava 2014, 175 p., in Slovak.
