= Rezső Máder =

Rezső Máder Mader Raoul
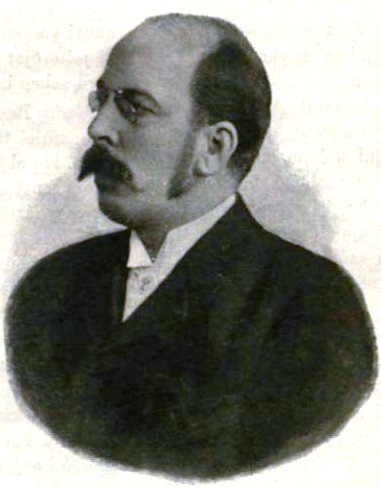
- Born: Mader Raoul; June 25, 1856 in Pozsony or Pressburg (former Hungarian Kingdom)
- Died: October 16, 1940; Budapest

Rezső Máder, (in Hungarian sequence) Máder Rezső (June 25, 1856 – October 16, 1940) was a Hungarian conductor, composer, and playwright. His original name was Raoul.

Raoul Mader was born on June 25, 1856, in Pozsony or Pressburg (Hungarian kingdom, modern day Bratislava in Slovakia), he died on October 16, 1940, in Budapest.

== Biography ==
Rezső Máder had a gymnasium in his native city, followed by a conservatory in Vienna. Between 1882 and 1895 he taught in the conservatory and he served in Vienna Opera House, later he ran in the Royal Opera House of Budapest. In 1901 he was appointed Vice President, in the following year Chief Executive. He made the Opera House the most popular theater in Budapest. In 1907 he took over the management of Népszínház. Between 1917 and 1919 he headed of the Folk Theater of Vienna, from 1921 to 1925, again from the Operejo in Budapest. He received the title "Eternal Year of the Opera" in 1925, in addition he received Italian and Hungarian awards.

He was married in 1896.

== Compositions ==
- Szökevények (1891, opera in Vienna)
- A piros cipő (1897, ballet in Budapest, presented a hundred times in 1908)
- She (1898, ballet in Budapest) Kadétkisasszony (1900, an operet in Népszínház)
- Primadonnák (1900, opereta in Theater Magyar)
- Szerelmi kaland (1902, ballet in the Opera House of Budapest)
- A nagymama (1908, opereta of the comedy in Népszínház)
- Mályvácska királykisasszony (1921, ballet in the Opera House of Budapest)
