= Martina Lubyová =

Slovak politician (1967–2023)

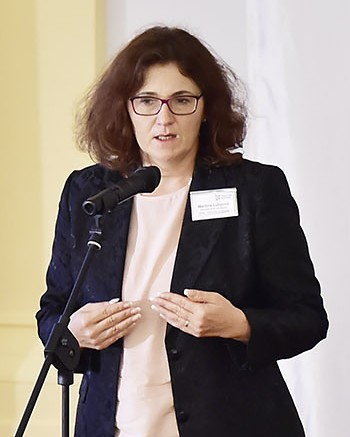
- Lubyová in 2017

Minister of Education, Science, Research and Sport
- In office 13 September 2017 – 21 March 2020
- Prime Minister: Robert Fico; Peter Pellegrini
- Preceded by: Peter Plavčan
- Succeeded by: Branislav Gröhling

Personal details
- Born: 12 May 1967 Bratislava, Czechoslovakia
- Died: 20 November 2023 (aged 56)
- Party: Slovak National Party
- Children: 1
- Education: Comenius University; CERGE-EI

Martina Lubyová (12 May 1967 – 20 November 2023) was a Slovak economist and politician. She served as Slovakia's minister of education, science, research, and sport between 2017 and 2020. She was a member of the Slovak National Party.

== Early life ==
Martina Lubyová was born on 12 May 1967 in Bratislava. Her father is Štefan Luby, a prominent physicist and a former president of the Slovak Academy of Sciences (1995–2009). Following the example of her father, she studied biophysics at the Faculty of Mathematics, Physics and Informatics of the Comenius University, graduating in 1991. In 1999, she graduated with degrees in law and statistics, also from Comenius University. She obtained her PhD in Economics from CERGE-EI in 2002.

In 1995, Lubyová joined the Slovak Academy of Sciences as a researcher. In 2000, she moved to Moscow to work for the International Labour Organization. In 2010, she rejoined the Slovak Academy of Sciences and taught statistics at the University of Economics in Bratislava.

== Political career ==
Lubyová became Minister of Education on 11 September 2017 as a nominee of the Slovak National Party, replacing Peter Plavčan, who was forced to resign after corruption allegations related to distributions of European science funding. Lubyová herself faced criticism for distributing the funding, facing an unsuccessful no-confidence vote in the parliament in 2019. Research funding allocated during her term was largely reversed by the new government after 2020.

As minister, Lubyová initiated a reform of the university accreditation process in Slovakia by establishing an independent accreditation agency for higher education.

In 2019, she joined the Slovak National Party. Lubyová defended the party's chairman, Andrej Danko, accused of plagiarism in his Master's thesis, claiming that it is not right to harass people 20 years after their graduation "because of some missing quotations".

Lubyová retired from politics after the Slovak National Party failed to pass the representation threshold in the 2020 Slovak parliamentary election, and returned to the Slovak Academy of Sciences.

== Death ==
Martina Lubyová died on 20 November 2023, at the age of 56.
