= Abraham Mendel Theben =

Hungarian Jewish leader

Abraham Mendel Theben (before 1738 – 1768) was the head of the Jewish community in the Kingdom of Hungary.

== Biography ==
Theben was the son of Menahem Mendel Theben (died in 1738), leader of the Jewish community in Pressburg. In Jewish sources, Theben is referred to as manhig ufarnas ham'dina (English: "leader and chief of the country"), which means that the Jews of the entire kingdom recognised him as their leader. He maintained a close relationship with the Habsburg court and Austrian aristocracy. He used his influence to promote the interests of his people, personally travelling to Vienna to intervene with Maria Theresa, Queen of Hungary, on behalf of Jews who had been imprisoned for a blood libel in the village of Orkuta. Mendel Theben was a special favourite of the Empress-Queen despite her strong Judeophobia and she listened to him with sympathy.

He was the father of Jacob Mendel Theben. His daughter was married to the son of Jonathan Eybeshutz.

== Bibliography ==
- Patai, Raphael: The Jews of Hungary: history, culture, psychology Wayne State University Press 1996 ISBN 0-8143-2561-0
