= Ivan Čičmanec =

Slovak writer (born 1942)

Ivan Čičmanec (Note: Also known as Peter Liptovský, Vlado Záhor, Viliam Krajec, and Igor Orfan) (born 21 August 1942, Bratislava, Slovakia) is a Slovak writer, poet, essayist and translator.

== Life ==
Ivan Čičmanec was born in Bratislava in 1942. Between the years 1960–1967, with a few breaks, he studied at the Faculty of Building Engineering of the Slovak University of Technology in Bratislava. He did not finish this study. He immigrated to Norway in 1969. Apart from other jobs, he worked for a while as a factory and port labourer, a waiter, a cleaning man, a night guard, an interpreter and a freelance journalist. In the years 1970–1975 he studied Russian, English and Theatre studies at the University of Oslo. After that he taught at an elementary school in Oslo for 21 years. He started his literary work in the year 1978 – as an author and translator, publishing in Norwegian, Slovak and other periodicals. In the 1980s he was an active contributor to Slovak and Czech exile periodicals as well as to the Czecho-Slovak broadcast of Radio Free Europe. In 1993 he became the first chairman of the newly established Norwegian–Slovak Society based in Oslo. Currently he is a member of the Norwegian PEN Centre, of the Club of Independent Writers in Slovakia and of the Slovak PEN Centre. Ivan Čičmanec received the Hviezdoslav Prize 2013 for his translations of Slovak literature into Norwegian. His book of poetry Violet Music was awarded "the best poetry book of the year 2013" by the Slovak Literary Foundation.

== Literary work ==
Ivan Čičmanec writes essays, articles, polemic texts, short stories, poems and theatre plays. In his essays he focuses predominantly on topics such as literature, theatre and religion. Occasionally he also writes about film, visual art, music, philosophy and social issues.

=== Works in Slovak ===
In Slovakia he has published the following books:

- In the Focus of Absence / V ohnisku neprítomnosti (2005)., with the subtitle Gnostic meditations a cyclus of spiritually themed prose poems
- Sighs and Punches / Vzdychy a údery (2011), a book of short stories with motives of human suffering, mystery of existence and complicated erotic relationships
- The Fragile Magic of Dissonances / Krehké čaro disonancií (2012), a book of essays, literary studies and portraits of world writers and other cultural personalities (1)
- Violet Music / Fialová hudba (2013), a book of poems about internal traumas of modern people, their erotic desires and absurdities of the everyday life (2), (3)
- The Bratislava Satyr / Bratislavský satyr (2015) - a short novel from today's Slovakia, ironically depicting the chaotic emotional and erotic life of an aging petty bourgois
- From the Evening Contemplations (Z večerných kontemplácií), 2019, a longer cyclus of reflexions, short stories and prose poems on various philosophical and esthetical issues
- Life is but a Walking Shadow (Život je len chodiaci tieň), 2019, a selection of new essays and articles predominantly on literature and theatre
- Lived and Dreamed (Zažité a vysnívané), 2022, a collection of 21 short-stories about people in dramatic existential life situations
- Captured by Curiosity (V zajatí zvedavosti), 2023, a selection of literary, philosophical and autobiographical essays and articles from the period 2001-2022

Ivan Čičmanec had been publishing his articles, essays, studies, notes, critiques and gradually also his short stories, poems, theatre plays and translations from the end of the 1970s in Norwegian dailies and the magazines Morgenbladet, Aftenposten, Ergo, Kontrast, Karl Johan, Solidaritet Norge-Polen, Nordisk østforum, Marginal. In Slovakia he has contributed to the following periodicals: Kultúrny život, Tvorba, RAK, Slovenské pohľady, Romboid, Literárny týždenník, Javisko, Fraktál and others.

=== Works in Norwegian ===
- Blendet (Blinded; a short story) in the anthology Et dusin trekkfugler (A Dozen Migratory Birds, 1990)
- a Slovak themed issue of the magazine Ergo (1991)
- entries on Slovak literature and geography in two editions of the Big Norwegian Encyclopedia (Store Norske Leksikon, 1994–1999 and 2003–2006)

== Translations ==
=== Translations into Norwegian ===
- an anthology of the Slovak surrealist poetry Fiken på piletrær (Figy na vŕbach / Figs on Willow Trees, 1984) - co-translator: Kjell Heggelund
- selected poems of the Slovak poet Ján Buzássy: Midlertidig evighet, Dočasná večnosť / Temporary Eternity, 1989) - co-translator: Stig Sæterbakken(4)
- selected poems of the Slovak poet Ján Ondruš: Ansiktet mitt signerer jeg ikke, Svoju tvár nepodpíšem / I will not Sign My Face, 1995) - co-translator: Stig Sæterbakken (5)
- selected poems of the Slovak poet Milan Richter: Røter i lufta, Korene vo vzduchu / Roots in the Air, 1996); co-translators: Knut Ødegård and Ľubo Mauer
- selected poems of the Slovak poet Ivan Kupec: Samtaler med skygger, Rozhovory s tieňmi / Conversations with Shadows, 2000) - co-translator: Stig Sæterbakken
- Slovak part of the short story anthology Tsjekkoslovakia forteller (Česko-Slovensko rozpráva / Czecho-Slovakia Speaks, 1990) - co-translator: Marianne Johnsen

=== Translations into Slovak ===
In Slovakia he has compiled the following:

- an anthology of contemporary Norwegian poetry Krajina s dvoma slnkami (1992) / A Country with Two Suns - together with Stig Sæterbakken
- a Norwegian themed issue of the magazine Romboid (1994)

He compiled and translated selected works of the Norwegian poets:

- Sigbjørn Obstfelder: Tak toto je domov ľudí (1998) / So This Is The Home of People
- Gunvor Hofmo: Smútok príde včas (2001) / Sorrow Will Come in Time
