= Silvia Petöová =

Slovak actress (1968–2019)

- Born: 2 September 1968; Bratislava, Czechoslovakia
- Died: 30 May 2019 (aged 50); Bratislava, Slovakia
- Education: Academy of Performing Arts in Bratislava
- Occupation: Actress
- Children: 1

Silvia Petöová (2 September 1968 – 30 May 2019) was a Slovak actress.

Petöová was born on 2 September 1968 in Bratislava, where she spent her entire life. She studied acting at the Academy of Performing Arts in Bratislava. Following graduation, she appeared in plays at the Slovak National Theatre, the Astorka Korzo '90 Theatre, the New Scene and the Trnava Theatre.

She was also active as a television actress, being featured in soap operas Susedia and Ordinácia v ružovej záhrade. Additionally, she hosted the erotic TV show Láskanie on TV Markíza. She also co-hosted the lifestyle talk show L.O.V.E. with Mária Čírová on Markíza Doma.

Petöová died at the age of 50 on 30 May 2019 after a long battle with breast cancer. She was survived by her son Filip.
