= Tatiana Kulíšková =

Slovak actress and television presenter

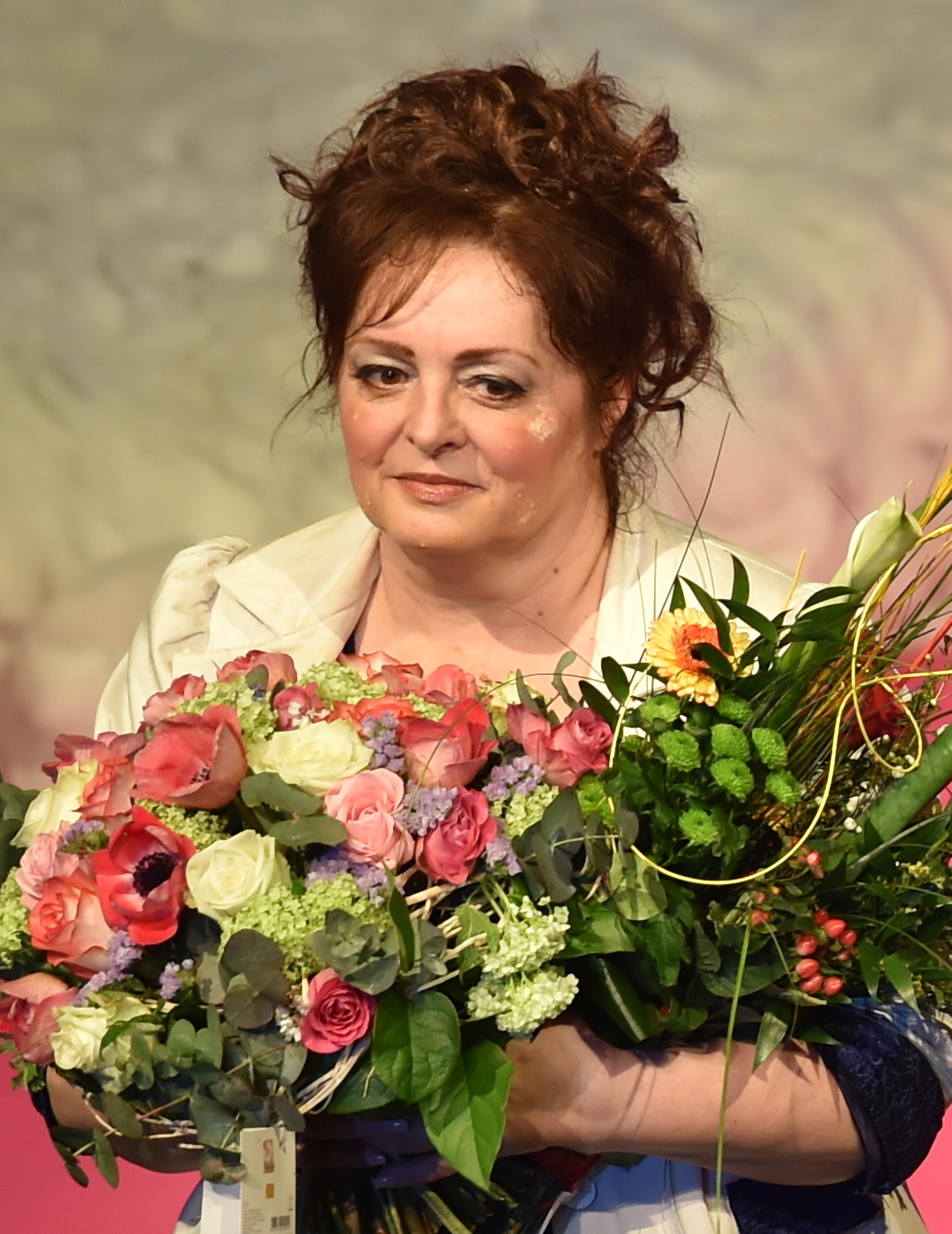
- Kulíšková in 2017
- Born: 22 March 1961 (age 64); Bratislava, Czechoslovakia
- Occupation: Actress
- Years active: 1977–present

Tatiana Kulíšková (born 22 March 1961) is a Slovak actress and television presenter. She established herself as an actress with a lead part in the 1984 film Láska z pasáže. As well as working in films, she has appeared at the Divadlo Jána Palárika in Trnava, Productions she has acted in include: Rok na dedine, Čaj u pána senátora, Sen noci svätojánskej and Valčík pre Popolušku. Kulíšková won the Zlatá Slučka award for dubbing.

Kulíšková studied at the Academy of Performing Arts in Bratislava, subsequently joining the Theatre for Children and Youth in Trnava in 1986. She met her partner, actor Vladimír Jedľovský, at the theatre in Trnava. Together they have a son, Adam.
