= Karl Kreibich (politician, born 1867) =

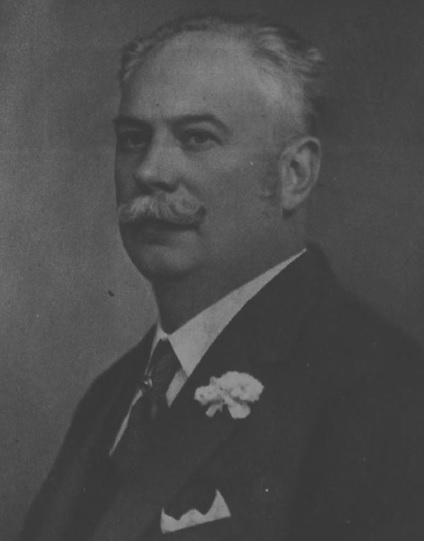
Image of Kreibich Karl

Karl Kreibich (21 August 1867 – 26 February 1949) was an ethnic German politician in the First Czechoslovak Republic.

== Biography ==
Kreibich was born in Bratislava on 21 August 1867. He worked as a wholesale trader in Bratislava. On 21 February 1933, he replaced Rudolf Böhm as Senator in the Czechoslovak National Assembly, following Böhm's death. He represented the German section of the Provincial Christian-Socialist Party in the Senate. Kreibich's Senate mandate ended in 1935.

Kreibich died on 26 February 1949.
