= Eva Sakálová =

Slovak actress

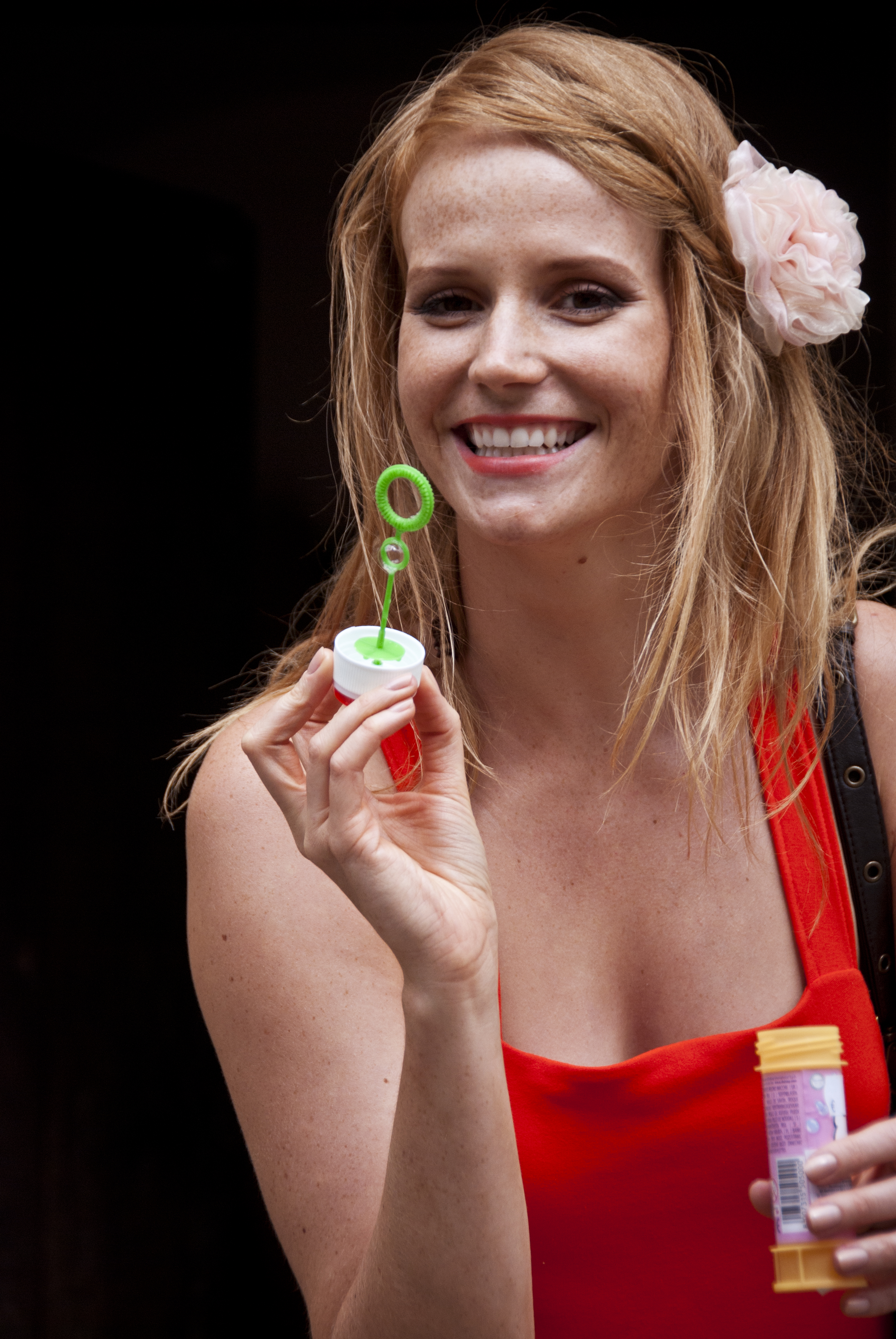
- Sakálová in 2011
- Born: 9 May 1985 (age 39); Bratislava, Czechoslovakia
- Occupation: Actress
- Years active: 2003-present

Eva Sakálová (born 9 May 1985) is a Slovak stage and television actress. As well as parts in television series and films, she has performed in productions at the Slovak National Theater.

== Selected filmography ==
- 7 dní hříchů (2012)
- Panelák (television, 2012)
