= Natália Fondrková =

Slovak national field hockey player

Personal information
- Full name: Natália Fondrková
- Born: 28 May 1997 (age 29) Bratislava, Slovakia
- Height: 1.65 m (5 ft 5 in)

Sport
- Sport: Field hockey
- Position: Midfielder
- Club: KPH Rača
Senior career
Years	Team	Caps	Goals
2017–2019	HC Praga 1946	-	-
2019–present	KPH Rača	-	-
National team
Years	Team	Caps	Goals
2019–present	Slovakia	11	(1)
2014–present	Slovakia indoor	30	(23)
- Updated on 18 July 2023

Natália Fondrková (born 28 May 1997) is a Slovak Field hockey player who plays as a midfielder and has appeared for Slovakia women's national field hockey team. She previously played for Czech club HC Praga 1946 but currently is playing for Slovak team KPH Rača Bratislava. She was part of Slovak squad which played in EuroHockey Junior Championship U21 A- division in Prague 2015, EuroHockey Indoor Championship II (W) 2014, 2018 Croatia Indoor Cup (W), 2018 EuroHockey Indoor Championship III (W), 2019 Croatia Indoor Cup (W), EuroHockey Championship III (Women) 2019, EuroHockey Indoor Championship III 2020 (W) in Bratislava. With total 38 caps played and 22 international goals scored.
