= Monika Mockovčáková =

Slovak musician

Monika Mockovčáková (born 20 May 1971 in Bratislava) is a Slovak classical pianist. She won the National Music Competition at thirteen years old. Mockovčáková has performed in countries such as Czech Republic, Hungary, Austria, Germany, Belgium, and the United States. She participated in the Washington International Piano Arts Council Competition and finished in second place.
