= Árpád Duka-Zólyomi =

Hungarian politician and scientist (1941–2013)

Árpád Duka-Zólyomi (8 May 1941 – 26 July 2013) was a Hungarian nuclear physicist, university teacher and politician from Slovakia. He was deputy of National Council from 1992 to 2004 and Member of the European Parliament with the Party of the Hungarian Coalition, part of the European People's Party, from 2004 to 2009.

Duka-Zólyomi was born in Bratislava. He studied gymnasium in Galanta and then from 1958 to 1960 worked as laborer. From 1962 to 1968, he studied nuclear reactor physics at the Czech Technical University in Prague, then worked as researcher and teacher at Faculty of Mathematics and Physics of Comenius University in Bratislava. From 1976 to 1989 he was researcher at Laboratory of Neutron Physics of Joint Institute for Nuclear Research (Dubna, Russia), after he returned to Comenius University in Bratislava, where he worked until 2008.

From 1968 to 1970, he was chairman of Association of Hungarian Youth in Slovakia. He was a member of the political party Coexistence (1991–1998 vicechairman), then in 1998, the party merged into Party of the Hungarian Coalition, when he was from 1998 to 2005 vicechairman.

In 1992 elections he was elected as member of National Council and reelected again in 1994, 1998 and 2002. In 2004 elections he was elected as member of European Parliament for Slovakia. In EP he was substitute for the Committee on Foreign Affairs and a vice-chair of the Delegation to the EU-Armenia, EU-Azerbaijan and EU-Georgia Parliamentary Cooperation Committees and a substitute for the Delegation for relations with Belarus. He was also chairman of the Slovak-Hungarian group of the Inter-Parliamentary Union (1998–2004), member of the EU-Slovak Republic Joint Parliamentary Committee (1995–2002), member of the Organization for Security and Co-operation in Europe Parliamentary Assembly (2002–2004) and member of the Council of Europe Parliamentary Assembly (1999–2004).

He died on 26 July 2013.
