= Alois Machatschek =

Austrian architect, historian and preservationist

Alois Machatschek (born 25 November 1928 in Bratislava; died 5 May 2014 in Salzburg) was an Austrian architect, architectural historian, university professor and architectural preservationist.

== Life ==
Machatschek, the son of a builder, studied architecture at the Vienna College of Technology and then worked for Karl Holey as an assistant at the Institute for Architecture and Architectural Drawing. In 1961, he completed a doctorate. Among his early work was participation in the design of the Arthur-Schnitzler-Hof Gemeindebau in Döbling. In the 1960s, Machatschek devoted himself mainly to Mediterranean architectural history and received his habilitation for a work on tomb buildings in Rough Cilicia.

Machatschek was known above all for his cautious, high-quality restorations of historic buildings. After his habilitation, he devoted himself increasingly to Historic preservation. The restoration of the Schloss Rohrau, seat of the Harrach family, followed several projects for the Princely Family of Liechtenstein. Together with Wilfried Schermann, Machatschek conducted the renovations of the Palais Ferstel from 1978 to 1986 and the baroque Palais Caprara-Geymüller on Wallnerstraße, Vienna from 1986 to 1988. He was responsible for the reopening of Otto Wagner's Vorortelinie of the Wiener Stadtbahn as Line S 45 of the Vienna S-Bahn in 1987 after a decade of closure. This project involved some new construction around Haltestelle Wien Krottenbachstraße and Haltestelle Wien Breitensee in a Postmodern style which was modelled on Wagner's work.

Machatschek taught at the Vienna University of Technology and was President of the Österreichische Gesellschaft für Denkmal- und Ortsbildpflege from 1998 to 2006.

== Selected publications ==
- 1987. Bauforschungen in Selge. (Architectural Research in Selge; with Mario Schwarz, Josef Dorner und Fritz Schachermeyr)
- 1988. Die Nekropolen und Grabmäler im Gebiet von Elaiussa Sebaste und Korykos im Rauhen Kilikien. (The Necropoleis and Tomb Paintings in the Area of Elaiussa Sebaste and Korykos in Rough Cilicia)
- 2001. Denkmalpflege in Europa. Der Europa-Preis für Denkmalpflege der Alfred Toepfer Stiftung. (Architectural Preservation in Europe: The Alfred Toepfer Foundation Europe Prize for Architectural Preservation)

== Bibliography ==
- Alois Machatschek, Martin Kubelík, Mario Schwarz, Walter Frodl: Von der Bauforschung zur Denkmalpflege: Festschrift für Alois Machatschek zum 65. Geburtstag. Wien: Phoibos-Verlag 1993
- Mario Schwarz: "Editorial." In: Steine Sprechen. No.138-139, November 2009, p. 2
