= List of ŠK Slovan Bratislava players =

Sport Club Slovan Bratislava also referred to as ŠK Slovan, Slovan Bratislava or simply Slovan is a professional football club from Bratislava, Slovakia. The club is historically one of the most successful clubs that dominate the Slovak national football league (Slovak First League).

== Notable players ==
The following players had collected senior international caps for their respective countries. Players whose name is listed in bold represented their countries while playing for Slovan.

- (Suriname) **Myenty Abena**
- (Czechoslovakia) **Jozef Adamec**
- (Benin) Moise Adilehou
- (Nigeria) Uche Agbo
- (Slovakia) **Ján Arpáš**
- (Ivory Coast) Mamadou Bagayoko
- (Slovenia) **Kenan Bajrić**
- (Slovakia) (Czechoslovakia) Jozef Baláži
- (Slovakia) **Igor Bališ**
- (Armenia) **Tigran Barseghyan**
- (Czechoslovakia) **Michal Benedikovič**
- (Czechoslovakia) (Slovakia) **Štefan Biró**
- (Panama) **César Blackman**
- (Canada) **Milan Borjan**
- (Bulgaria) **Vasil Bozhikov**
- (Bosnia and Herzegovina) Mario Božić
- (Slovakia) Michal Breznaník
- (Czechoslovakia) **Titus Buberník**
- (Guinea) Sahmkou Camara
- (The Gambia) Suleiman Camara
- (Czechoslovakia) **Štefan Čambal**
- (Czechoslovakia) **Ján Čapkovič**
- (Czechoslovakia) **Jozef Čapkovič**
- (Georgia (country)) **Giorgi Chakvetadze**
- (Slovakia) Roman Čerepkai
- (Slovakia) **Ivan Chodák**
- (Czechoslovakia) (Slovakia) **Miroslav Chvíla**
- (Slovakia) Erik Čikoš
- (Slovakia) Juraj Čobej
- (Angola) Sandro Cruz
- (Czechoslovakia) Jozef Čurgaly
- (Czechoslovakia) **Ľudovít Cvetler**
- (Czechoslovakia) (Slovakia) **Ferdinand Daučík**
- (Slovakia) **Vernon De Marco**
- (Slovakia) Igor Demo
- (Slovakia) **Martin Dobrotka**
- (Czech Republic) Lukáš Droppa
- (Czechoslovakia) (Slovakia) **Peter Dubovský**
- (Slovakia) **Peter Dzúrik**
- (Slovakia) Martin Fabuš
- (Slovakia) **Ľubomír Faktor**
- (Slovakia) Branislav Fodrek
- (Slovakia) **Artur Gajdoš**
- (Czechoslovakia) Kazimír Gajdoš
- (Czechoslovakia) **Dušan Galis**
- (Czechoslovakia) (Slovakia) **Miloš Glonek**
- (Czechoslovakia) **Koloman Gögh**
- (Slovakia) **Pavol Gostič**
- (Slovakia) **Dominik Greif**
- (Slovakia) **Karim Guédé**
- (Hungary) Richárd Guzmics
- (Slovakia) Marián Had
- (Slovakia) Juraj Halenár
- (Slovakia) Marek Hamšík
- (Slovakia) Michal Hanek
- (Algeria) Youssef Haraoui
- (Czechoslovakia) Peter Herda
- (Slovakia) Andrej Hesek
- (Czechoslovakia) Ján Hlavatý
- (Slovakia) Filip Hlohovský
- (Slovakia) Marek Hollý
- (Hungary) **Dávid Holman**
- (Slovakia) Filip Hološko
- (Slovakia) Zsolt Hornyák
- (Czechoslovakia) **Alexander Horváth**
- (Czechoslovakia) **Ivan Hrdlička**
- (Czechoslovakia) **Vladimír Hrivnák**
- (Slovakia) David Hrnčár
- (Slovakia) **Eduard Hrnčár**
- (Slovakia) **Norbert Hrnčár**
- (Uzbekistan) **Aziz Ibrahimov**
- (Ukraine) Danylo Ihnatenko
- (Slovakia) Milan Ivana
- (Slovakia) **Tibor Jančula**
- (The Gambia) Maudo Jarjué
- (Czechoslovakia) **Karol Jokl**
- (Slovakia) **Jozef Juriga**
- (Georgia (country)) **Jaba Kankava**
- (Slovakia) **Jozef Karel**
- (Georgia (country)) **Guram Kashia**
- (Hungary) **András Keresztúri**
- (Czechoslovakia) (Slovakia) **Vladimír Kinder**
- (Czechoslovakia) **Vladimír Kinier**
- (Slovakia) Filip Kiss
- (Czech Republic) Jiří Kladrubský
- (Slovakia) Tomáš Kóňa
- (Slovakia) Martin Konečný
- (Slovakia) **Miroslav König**
- (Slovakia) **Kamil Kopúnek**
- (Czechoslovakia) Július Korostelev
- (Slovakia) **Juraj Kotula**
- (Czechoslovakia) (Slovakia) Ervín Kováč
- (Slovakia) Pavel Kováč
- (Slovakia) **Ján Kozák Jr.**
- (Slovakia) Samuel Kozlovský
- (Czechoslovakia) (Slovakia) **Ondrej Krištofík**
- (Czechoslovakia) (Hungary) (Spain) (Catalonia) **László Kubala**
- (Slovakia) **František Kubík**
- (Slovakia) **Juraj Kucka**
- (Czechoslovakia) **Ľudovít Lancz**
- (Slovakia) Richard Lásik
- (Bulgaria) (Czechoslovakia) **Bozhin Laskov**
- (Czechoslovakia) **Milan Luhový**
- (Czechoslovakia) (Slovakia) **Jozef Luknár**
- (Slovakia) Filip Lukšík
- (Slovakia) **Štefan Maixner**
- (Slovakia) **Jozef Majoroš**
- (Slovakia) (Czechoslovakia) **Anton Malatinský**
- (Slovakia) **Nino Marcelli**
- (Panama) Cristian Martínez
- (Czechoslovakia) **Marián Masný**
- (Slovakia) **Ľubomír Meszároš**
- (Czechoslovakia) Pavol Michalík
- (Togo) Idjessi Metsoko
- (Serbia) Marko Milinković
- (Czechoslovakia) (Slovakia) **Ladislav Molnár**
- (Czechoslovakia) **Pavol Molnár**
- (Czechoslovakia) **Anton Moravčík**
- (Slovakia) Stanislav Moravec
- (Czechoslovakia) Ivan Mráz
- (Slovakia) Samuel Mráz
- (Slovakia) **Ján Mucha**
- (Czechoslovakia) **Peter Mutkovič**
- (Hungary) Tamás Nagy
- (Czech Republic) Radim Nečas
- (Czechoslovakia) Milan Nemec
- (Slovakia) **Szilárd Németh**
- (Timor-Leste) Jairo Neto
- (Slovakia) **Branislav Niňaj**
- (Czechoslovakia) **Jozef Obert**
- (Slovakia) Martin Obšitník
- (Slovakia) **Branislav Obžera**
- (Czechoslovakia) **Anton Ondruš**
- (Slovakia) **Filip Oršula**
- (Slovakia) Michal Pančík
- (Slovakia) **Lukáš Pauschek**
- (Slovenia) Zoran Pavlović
- (Czechoslovakia) **Emil Pažický**
- (Slovakia) Mário Pečalka
- (Czechoslovakia) (Slovakia) **Ladislav Pecko**
- (Slovenia) Andrej Pečnik
- (Trinidad and Tobago) **Lester Peltier**
- (Slovakia) **Peter Petráš**
- (Slovakia) Juraj Piroska
- (Czechoslovakia) **Ján Pivarník**
- (Greece) Vasileios Pliatsikas
- (Kingdom of Yugoslavia) (Slovakia) **Ján Podhradský**
- (Slovakia) **Peter Pokorný**
- (Slovakia) Martin Polaček
- (Czechoslovakia) **Ján Popluhár**
- (Czechoslovakia) (Slovakia) **Tomáš Porubský**
- (Hungary) István Priboj
- (Hungary) **Tamás Priskin**
- (Nigeria) Ibrahim Rabiu
- (Czech Republic) Jakub Rada
- (Czechoslovakia) (Slovakia) **Ľudovít Rado**
- (Venezuela) Eric Ramírez
- (Slovakia) (Czechoslovakia) **Theodor Reimann**
- (Morocco) **Moha Rharsalla**
- (Greece) Spyros Risvanis
- (Luxembourg) **Gerson Rodrigues**
- (Slovakia) **Štefan Rusnák**
- (Slovakia) Branislav Rzeszoto
- (Slovakia) **Kornel Saláta**
- (Montenegro) **Vukan Savićević**
- (Czechoslovakia) **Viliam Schrojf**
- (Czechoslovakia) **Július Schubert**
- (South Africa) Granwald Scott
- (Slovakia) **Filip Šebo**
- (Slovakia) **Pavol Sedlák**
- (Slovakia) **Boris Sekulić**
- (Slovakia) Stanislav Šesták
- (Czechoslovakia) **Gejza Šimanský**
- (Slovakia) **Samuel Slovák**
- (Slovakia) **Miloš Soboňa**
- (Czechoslovakia) **Pavol Šoral**
- (Guinea) **Seydouba Soumah**
- (Slovenia) **Andraž Šporar**
- (Austria) Stefan Stangl
- (Czechoslovakia) (Slovakia) **Leopold Šťastný**
- (Slovakia) Samuel Štefánik
- (Slovakia) **David Strelec**
- (Czechoslovakia) Karel Stromšík
- (Slovakia) **Tomáš Stúpala**
- (Slovakia) **Michal Šulla**
- (Czechoslovakia) **Ján Švehlík**
- (Slovakia) Jakub Sylvestr
- (Slovakia) **Otto Szabó**
- (Slovakia) **Dominik Takáč**
- (Czechoslovakia) **Viktor Tegelhoff**
- (Czechoslovakia) (Slovakia) **Jaroslav Timko**
- (Slovakia) **Milan Timko**
- (Czechoslovakia) (Slovakia) **Dušan Tittel**
- (Slovakia) **Róbert Tomaschek**
- (Nigeria) Duke Udi
- (Slovakia) Marek Ujlaky
- (Czechoslovakia) **Anton Urban**
- (Slovakia) **Jozef Valachovič**
- (Czechoslovakia) Vojtech Varadín
- (Slovakia) **Stanislav Varga**
- (Czechoslovakia) **Alexander Vencel Sr.**
- (Czechoslovakia) (Slovakia) **Alexander Vencel Jr.**
- (Slovakia) (Czechoslovakia) **Vladimír Venglár**
- (Czechoslovakia) **Jozef Vengloš**
- (Czech Republic) Petr Veselý
- (Czechoslovakia) **Michal Vičan**
- (Slovakia) **Róbert Vittek**
- (Austria) Kevin Wimmer
- (Slovakia) **Vladimír Weiss Jr.**
- (Slovakia) **Marián Zeman**
- (Czechoslovakia) **Ján Zlocha**
- (Czechoslovakia) **Ľudovít Zlocha**
- (Czech Republic) **Jaromír Zmrhal**
- (Slovakia) **Igor Žofčák**
- (Slovakia) **Adam Zreľák**

== Players ==
Name	Nationality	Position	Slovan career	Apps	Goals
Ján Podhradský	Czechoslovakia; Kingdom of Yugoslavia	MF	1941-1947	153	124
Michal Vičan	Czechoslovakia	MF	1945-1957	231	Unk.
Viliam Schrojf	Czechoslovakia	GK	1955-1965	240	0
Karol Jokl	Czechoslovakia	MF	1963-1975	238	68
Alexander Vencel	Czechoslovakia	GK	1965-1977	321	0
Koloman Gögh	Czechoslovakia	DF	1970-1980	225	3
Tomáš Stúpala	Czechoslovakia; Slovakia	DF	1984-1986; 1987-1998	264	1
Miloš Glonek	Czechoslovakia; Slovakia	DF	1986-1992; 1997-1998	117	4
Alexander Vencel	Czechoslovakia; Slovakia	GK	1987-1989; 1990-1994	132	0
Ladislav Pecko	Czechoslovakia; Slovakia	DF	1988-2005	431	30
Dušan Tittel	Czechoslovakia; Slovakia	DF	1988-1991; 1993-1997; 2001	222	49
Vladimír Kinder	Czechoslovakia; Slovakia	DF	1990-1996	161	22
Zsolt Hornyák	Czechoslovakia; Slovakia	DF	1991-1993; 1994-1995; 1997-1999; 2002-2004	132	5
Štefan Maixner	Czechoslovakia; Slovakia	FW	1992-1998	103	29
Miloš Soboňa	Slovakia	DF	1993-2001	132	8
Samuel Slovák	Slovakia	MF	1994-1997; 2000-2001; 2005-2010	157	32
Miroslav König	Slovakia	GK	1995-2000	105	0
Ľubomír Meszároš	Slovakia	FW	1997-2002; 2005-2009	185	53
Pavol Sedlák	Slovakia	MF	1997-2003; 2006-2012	208	18
Norbert Hrnčár	Slovakia	MF	1998-2004	154	27
Róbert Vittek	Slovakia	FW	1999-2003	101	47
Ján Šlahor	Slovakia	FW	2001-2004	102	19
Martin Dobrotka	Slovakia	DF	2003; 2006-2012	145	12
Pavol Masaryk	Slovakia	FW	2005-2010	149	56
Juraj Halenár	Slovakia	FW	2008-	115	46
Erik Grendel	Slovakia	MF	2009-	110	14
Matúš Putnocký	Slovakia	GK	2009-	109	0

== European Championship winners ==
- (Slovakia) Jozef Čapkovič
- (Slovakia) Koloman Gögh
- (Slovakia) Marián Masný
- (Slovakia) Anton Ondruš
- (Slovakia) Ján Pivarník
- (Slovakia) Ján Švehlík
- (Slovakia) Alexander Vencel

== World Cup players ==
- (Slovakia) Michal Benedikovič (1954)
- (Slovakia) Ján Čapkovič (1970)
- (Slovakia) Alexander Horváth (1970)
- (Slovakia) Ivan Hrdlička (1970)
- (Slovakia) Vladimír Hrivnák (1970)
- (Slovakia) Karol Jokl (1970)
- (Slovakia) Vladimír Kinier (1990)
- (Slovakia) Marián Masný (1982)
- (Slovakia) Pavol Molnár (1962)
- (Slovakia) Anton Moravčík (1958)
- (Slovakia) Jozef Orth (1938)
- (Slovakia) Emil Pažický (1954)
- (Slovakia) Ján Popluhár (1958, 1962)
- (Slovakia) Teodor Reimann (1954)
- (Slovakia) Kornel Saláta (2010)
- (Slovakia) Viliam Schrojf (1958, 1962)
- (Slovakia) Alexander Vencel (1970)
- (Slovakia) Ján Zlocha (1970)
