= Moldova national football team results (2000–2009) =

- Win Draw Loss

The Moldova national football team represents Moldova in association football and is controlled by the Federația Moldovenească de Fotbal (FMF), the governing body of the sport in the country. It competes as a member of the Union of European Football Associations (UEFA), which encompasses the countries of Europe.

The team's largest victory came on 18 August 1992 when they defeated Pakistan by five goals to nil. Their worst loss is 6–0 against Sweden in 2001. Alexandru Epureanu holds the appearance record for Moldova, having been capped 91 times since his first match in 2006. The goalscoring record is held by Serghei Cleșcenco, who scored eleven times in 69 matches. As of July 2019, Moldova are ranked 171st in the FIFA World Rankings. Its highest ever ranking of 37th was achieved in April 2008.

Moldova's first match of the 2000s was a 2–1 loss (after extra time) against Armenia in a Cyprus International Football Tournament. The team completed five qualification campaigns between 2000 and 2009, three for the FIFA World Cup and two for the UEFA European Championship; they failed to qualify in each. Between 2000 and 2009, the team played 90 matches and their record was 20 wins, 23 draws and 47 losses.

== Matches ==
=== 2000 ===
2 February Cyprus Tournament	Armenia	2–1 (a.e.t.)	Moldova	Larnaca, Cyprus
	Nazaryan 45'; Dokhoyan 95'	Report	Popovici 70'	Stadium: Ammochostos Stadium; Attendance: 250; Referee: Michalis Paparvarnavas (Cyprus)

4 February Cyprus Tournament	Lithuania	1–2	Moldova	Larnaca, Cyprus
	Fomenka 78'	Report	Rogaciov 13', 76'	Stadium: Ammochostos Stadium; Attendance: 150; Referee: D. Gudman (Cyprus)

6 February Cyprus Tournament	Moldova	2–0	Slovakia	Larnaca, Cyprus
	Testemiţanu 77' (pen.); Popovici 81'	Report		Stadium: GSZ Stadium; Attendance: 100; Referee: Loizos Loizou (Cyprus)

26 April Friendly	San Marino	0–1	Moldova	Serravalle, San Marino
		Report	Cleşcenco 49'	Stadium: Stadio Olimpico; Attendance: 100; Referee: Fiorenzo Treossi (Italy)

4 June Friendly	Moldova	0–1	Russia	Chişinău, Moldova
		Report	Buznikin 14'	Stadium: Stadionul Republican; Attendance: 16,000; Referee: Ábrahám Attila (Hungary)

16 August Friendly	Moldova	1–0	Malta	Chişinău, Moldova
	Serghei Rogaciov 45'	Report		Stadium: Stadionul Republican; Attendance: 7,000; Referee: Zöhrab Gadiyev (Azerbaijan)

2 September 2002 FIFA World Cup qualifying	Turkey	2–0	Moldova	Istanbul, Turkey
	Buruk 45'; Belözoğlu 75'	Report; Report (FIFA)		Stadium: Ali Sami Yen Stadium; Attendance: 17,000; Referee: Günter Benkö (Austria)

7 October 2002 FIFA World Cup qualifying	Moldova	0–1	Slovakia	Chişinău, Moldova
		Report; Report (FIFA)	Németh 79'	Stadium: Stadionul Republican; Attendance: 3,500; Referee: Fritz Stuchlik (Austria)

11 October 2002 FIFA World Cup qualifying	Moldova	0–0	Macedonia	Chişinău, Moldova
		Report; Report (FIFA)		Stadium: Stadionul Republican; Attendance: 4,500; Referee: Arturo Dauden Ibarra (Spain)

=== 2001 ===
14 February Friendly	Israel	1–0	Moldova	Herzliya, Israel
	Keisi 34'	Report		Stadium: Municipal Stadium; Attendance: 5,000; Referee: Andreas Georgiou (Cyprus)

24 March 2002 FIFA World Cup qualifying	Azerbaijan	0–0	Moldova	Baku, Azerbaijan
		Report; Report (FIFA)		Stadium: Tofiq Bahramov Stadium; Attendance: 20,000; Referee: Wolfgang Stark (Germany)

28 March 2002 FIFA World Cup qualifying	Moldova	0–2	Sweden	Chişinău, Moldova
		Report; Report (FIFA)	Allbäck 86', 90'	Stadium: Stadionul Republican; Attendance: 7,000; Referee: Laurent Duhamel (France)

25 April Friendly	Moldova	0–0	Estonia	Chişinău, Moldova
		Report		Stadium: Stadionul Republican; Attendance: 1,500; Referee: Viorel Anghelinei (Romania)

2 June 2002 FIFA World Cup qualifying	Macedonia	2–2	Moldova	Skopje, Macedonia
	Šakiri 20' (pen.); Krstev 65'	Report; Report (FIFA)	Pogreban 10'; Barburoş 72'	Stadium: Gradski Stadion; Attendance: 2,000; Referee: Jack van Hulten (Netherlands)

6 June 2002 FIFA World Cup qualifying	Sweden	6–0	Moldova	Gothenburg, Sweden
	Larsson 38' (pen.), 58', 68' (pen.), 79' (pen.); Alexandersson 74'; Allbäck 77'	Report; Report (FIFA)		Stadium: Nya Ullevi; Attendance: 30,233; Referee: Steve Dunn (England)

15 August Friendly	Portugal	3–0	Moldova	Faro, Portugal
	Figo 43' (pen.), 61' (pen.), 89'	Report		Stadium: Estádio de São Luís; Attendance: 12,000; Referee: Giorgos Borovilos (Greece)

1 September 2002 FIFA World Cup qualifying	Moldova	2–0	Azerbaijan	Chişinău, Moldova
	Cleşcenco 19'; Covalciuc 88'	Report; Report (FIFA)		Stadium: Stadionul Republican; Attendance: 4,800; Referee: Vasiliy Melnichuk (Ukraine)

5 September 2002 FIFA World Cup qualifying	Slovakia	4–2	Moldova	Trenčín, Slovakia
	P. Németh 54'; S. Németh 59'; Demo 64', 70'	Report; Report (FIFA)	Cleşcenco 11'; Rebeja 76'	Stadium: FK Ozeta Dukla Stadium; Attendance: 2,789; Referee: Mikko Vuorela (Finland)

6 October 2002 FIFA World Cup qualifying	Moldova	0–3	Turkey	Chişinău, Moldova
		Report; Report (FIFA)	Aşık 8'; Kahveci 79'; Mansiz 83'	Stadium: Stadionul Republican; Attendance: 5,000; Referee: Frank De Bleeckere (Belgium)

=== 2002 ===
9 February Rothmans Tournament	Lithuania	1–0	Moldova	Attard, Malta
	Beniušis 33'	Report		Stadium: Ta' Qali Stadium; Attendance: 800; Referee: Joseph Attard (Malta)

11 February Rothmans Tournament	Moldova	2–0	Jordan	Attard, Malta
	Golban 16', 69'	Report		Stadium: Ta' Qali Stadium; Attendance: 700; Referee: Anton Zammit (Malta)

13 February Rothmans Tournament	Malta	3–0	Moldova	Attard, Malta
	Mallia 35', 54'; Mifsud 90'	Report		Stadium: Ta' Qali Stadium; Attendance: 1,481; Referee: Darius Mieželis (Lithuania)

27 March Friendly	Moldova	0–2	Hungary	Chişinău, Moldova
		Report	Kenesei 14'; Tóth 51'	Stadium: Stadionul Republican; Attendance: 1,500; Referee: Vitaliy Godulyan (Ukraine)

21 August Friendly	Estonia	1–0	Moldova	Tallinn, Estonia
	Allas 54'	Report		Stadium: A. Le Coq Arena; Attendance: 1,500; Referee: Sten Kaldma (Estonia)

7 September UEFA Euro 2004 qualifying	Austria	2–0	Moldova	Vienna, Austria
	Herzog 4' (pen.), 29' (pen.)	Report; Report (UEFA)		Stadium: Ernst-Happel-Stadion; Attendance: 18,300; Referee: Stuart Dougal (Scotland)

12 October UEFA Euro 2004 qualifying	Moldova	0–2	Czech Republic	Chişinău, Moldova
		Report; Report (UEFA)	Jankulovski 69' (pen.); Rosický 79'	Stadium: Stadionul Republican; Attendance: 3,500; Referee: Leslie Irvine (Northern Ireland)

20 November Friendly	Hungary	1–1	Moldova	Budapest, Hungary
	Dárdai 55'	Report	Pațula 16'	Stadium: Üllői úti Stadion; Attendance: 6,000; Referee: Wolfgang Sowa (Austria)

=== 2003 ===
12 February Friendly	Georgia	2–2	Moldova	Tbilisi, Georgia
	Chaladze 61'; Ashvetia 83'	Report	Golban 76'; Dadu 84' (pen.)	Stadium: Lokomotiv Stadium; Attendance: 7,000; Referee: Gevorg Hovhannisyan (Armenia)

5 March Friendly	Israel	0–0	Moldova	Ramat Gan, Israel
		Report		Stadium: Ramat Gan Stadium; Attendance: 3,500; Referee: Paolo Bertini (Italy)

29 March UEFA Euro 2004 qualifying	Belarus	2–1	Moldova	Minsk, Belarus
	Kutuzov 43'; Gurenko 58'	Report; Report (UEFA)	Cebotari 14'	Stadium: Dinamo Stadium; Attendance: 8,000; Referee: Johan Verbist (Belgium)

2 April UEFA Euro 2004 qualifying	Moldova	1–2	Netherlands	Tiraspol, Moldova
	Boreţ 16'	Report; Report (UEFA)	van Nistelrooy 37' van Bommel 85'	Stadium: Sheriff Arena; Attendance: 12,500; Referee: Alain Sars (France)

7 June UEFA Euro 2004 qualifying	Moldova	1–0	Austria	Tiraspol, Moldova
	Frunză 60'	Report; Report (UEFA)		Stadium: Sheriff Arena; Attendance: 7,500; Referee: Joaquim Paulo Paraty da Silva (Portugal)

11 June UEFA Euro 2004 qualifying	Czech Republic	5–0	Moldova	Olomouc, Czech Republic
	Šmicer 41'; Koller 73' (pen.); Štajner 82'; Lokvenc 88', 90'	Report; Report (UEFA)		Stadium: Andrův Stadion; Attendance: 12,097; Referee: Kristinn Jakobsson (Israel)

20 August Friendly	Turkey	2–0	Moldova	Ankara, Turkey
	Kahveci 30'; Yilmaz 54'	Report		Stadium: 19 Mayis Stadi; Attendance: 15,300; Referee: Konrad Plautz (Austria)

10 September UEFA Euro 2004 qualifying	Moldova	2–1	Belarus	Tiraspol, Moldova
	Dadu 26'; Covalciuc 87'	Report; Report (UEFA)	Vasilyuk 90' (pen.)	Stadium: Sheriff Arena; Attendance: 7,000; Referee: Dejan Delević (Serbia & Montenegro)

11 October UEFA Euro 2004 qualifying	Netherlands	5–0	Moldova	Eindhoven, Netherlands
	Kluivert 43'; Sneijder 50' van Hooijdonk 73' (pen.) van der Vaart 79'; Robben 88'	Report; Report (UEFA)		Stadium: Philips Stadion; Attendance: 30,995; Referee: Željko Širić (Croatia)

20 November Friendly	Luxembourg	1–2	Moldova	Hesperange, Luxembourg
	Schauls 77'	Report	Golban 19'; Dadu 90'	Stadium: Stade Alphonse Theis; Attendance: 623; Referee: Laurent Duhamel (France)

=== 2004 ===
14 February Malta Tournament	Malta	0–0	Moldova	Attard, Malta
		Report		Stadium: Ta' Qali Stadium; Attendance: 1,000; Referee: Valery Vyalichka (Belarus)

16 February Malta Tournament	Belarus under-23	1–0	Moldova	Attard, Malta
	Hleb 39'	Report		Stadium: Ta' Qali Stadium; Attendance: 50; Referee: Joseph Attard (Malta)

18 February Malta Tournament	Estonia	1–0	Moldova	Attard, Malta
	Lindpere 58'	Report		Stadium: Ta' Qali Stadium; Attendance: 50; Referee: Lawrence Sammut (Malta)

31 March Friendly	Moldova	2–1	Azerbaijan	Chişinău, Moldova
	Dadu 42' (pen.), 84'	Report	Qurbanov 20'	Stadium: Stadionul Republican; Attendance: 5,500; Referee: Vitaliy Godulyan (Ukraine)

28 April Friendly	Israel	1–1	Moldova	Ramat Gan, Israel
	Covalenco 33' (o.g.)	Report	Rogaciov 71'	Stadium: Ramat Gan Stadium; Attendance: 4,796; Referee: Sorin Corpodean (Romania)

18 August Friendly	Moldova	1–0	Georgia	Tiraspol, Moldova
	Miterev 67'	Report		Stadium: Sheriff Arena; Attendance: 6,500; Referee: Vitaliy Godulyan (Ukraine)

4 September 2006 FIFA World Cup qualifying	Slovenia	3–0	Moldova	Celje, Slovenia
	Ačimovič 5', 27', 48'	Report; Report (FIFA)		Stadium: Arena Petrol; Attendance: 3,620; Referee: Jouni Hyytiä (Finland)

8 September 2006 FIFA World Cup qualifying	Moldova	0–1	Italy	Chişinău, Moldova
		Report; Report (FIFA)	Del Piero 32'	Stadium: Stadionul Republican; Attendance: 5,200; Referee: Michal Beneš (Czech Republic)

9 October 2006 FIFA World Cup qualifying	Belarus	4–0	Moldova	Minsk, Belarus
	Omelyanchuk 45'; Kutuzov 65'; Bulyha 75'; Romaschenko 90'	Report; Report (FIFA)		Stadium: Dinamo Stadium; Attendance: 21,000; Referee: Selçuk Dereli (Turkey)

13 October 2006 FIFA World Cup qualifying	Moldova	1–1	Scotland	Chişinău, Moldova
	Dadu 28'	Report; Report (FIFA)	Thompson 31'	Stadium: Stadionul Republican; Attendance: 7,000; Referee: Kristinn Jakobsson (Iceland)

=== 2005 ===
9 February Friendly	Azerbaijan	0–0	Moldova	Baku, Azerbaijan
		Report		Stadium: Tofiq Bahramov Stadium; Attendance: 1,500; Referee: Levan Paniashvili (Georgia)

30 March 2006 FIFA World Cup qualifying	Moldova	0–0	Norway	Chişinău, Moldova
		Report; Report (FIFA)		Stadium: Stadionul Republican; Attendance: 5,000; Referee: Florian Meyer (Germany)

4 June 2006 FIFA World Cup qualifying	Scotland	2–0	Moldova	Glasgow, Scotland
	Dailly 52'; McFadden 88'	Report; Report (FIFA)		Stadium: Hampden Park; Attendance: 45,317; Referee: Eric Braamhaar (Norway)

3 September 2006 FIFA World Cup qualifying	Moldova	2–0	Belarus	Chişinău, Moldova
	Rogaciov 17', 49'	Report; Report (FIFA)		Stadium: Stadionul Republican; Attendance: 5,000; Referee: Laurent Duhamel (France)

7 September 2006 FIFA World Cup qualifying	Moldova	1–2	Slovenia	Chişinău, Moldova
	Rogaciov 31'	Report; Report (FIFA)	Lavrič 47'; Mavrič 58'	Stadium: Stadionul Republican; Attendance: 7,200; Referee: Yuri Baskakov (Russia)

8 October 2006 FIFA World Cup qualifying	Norway	1–0	Moldova	Oslo, Norway
	Rushfeldt 50'	Report; Report (FIFA)		Stadium: Ullevaal Stadion; Attendance: 23,409; Referee: Steve Bennett (England)

12 October 2006 FIFA World Cup qualifying	Italy	2–1	Moldova	Lecce, Italy
	Vieri 70'; Gilardino 85'	Report; Report (FIFA)	Gațcan 76'	Stadium: Stadio Via del Mare; Attendance: 28,160; Referee: Olegário Benquerença (Portugal)

=== 2006 ===
18 May Friendly	Moldova	0–0	Azerbaijan	Chişinău, Moldova
		Report		Stadium: Stadionul Republican; Attendance: 3,500; Referee: Yuriy Baskakov (Russia)

16 August Friendly	Moldova	3–2	Lithuania	Chişinău, Moldova
	Dadu 15'; Epureanu 57' (pen.); Cleşcenco 87' (pen.)	Report	Poškus 14'; Danilevičius 38'	Stadium: Stadionul Zimbru; Attendance: 7,000; Referee: Vitaliy Godulyan (Ukraine)

2 September UEFA Euro 2008 qualifying	Moldova	0–1	Greece	Chişinău, Moldova
		Report; Report (UEFA)	Lyberopoulos 78'	Stadium: Stadionul Zimbru; Attendance: 10,500; Referee: Matteo Trefoloni (Italy)

6 September UEFA Euro 2008 qualifying	Norway	2–0	Moldova	Oslo, Norway
	Strømstad 74'; Iversen 79'	Report; Report (UEFA)		Stadium: Ullevaal Stadion; Attendance: 23,848; Referee: Hristo Ristoskov (Bulgaria)

7 October UEFA Euro 2008 qualifying	Moldova	2–2	Bosnia and Herzegovina	Chişinău, Moldova
	Rogaciov 13', 32' (pen.)	Report; Report (UEFA)	Misimović 63'; Grlić 68'	Stadium: Stadionul Zimbru; Attendance: 11,000; Referee: Hervé Piccirillo (France)

11 October UEFA Euro 2008 qualifying	Turkey	5–0	Moldova	Frankfurt, Germany^{a}
	Şükür 35', 37' (pen.), 43', 73'; Tuncay 68'	Report; Report (UEFA)		Stadium: Commerzbank-Arena; Attendance: 200; Referee: Nicolai Vollquartz (Denmark)

=== 2007 ===
7 February Friendly	Romania	2–0	Moldova	Bucharest, Romania
	Mazilu 75'; Mutu 75'	Report		Stadium: Stadionul Naţional; Attendance: 8,000; Referee: Alexandru Deaconu (Romania)

24 March UEFA Euro 2008 qualifying	Moldova	1–1	Malta	Chişinău, Moldova
	Epureanu 85'	Report; Report (UEFA)	Mallia 73'	Stadium: Stadionul Zimbru; Attendance: 10,000; Referee: Vusal Aliyev (Azerbaijan)

28 March UEFA Euro 2008 qualifying	Hungary	2–0	Moldova	Budapest, Hungary
	Priskin 9'; Gera 63'	Report; Report (UEFA)		Stadium: Szusza Ferenc Stadium; Attendance: 5,000; Referee: Martin Ingvarsson (Sweden)

6 June UEFA Euro 2008 qualifying	Greece	2–1	Moldova	Heraklion^{b}, Greece
	Charisteas 30'; Lyberopoulos 90'	Report; Report (UEFA)	Frunză 80'	Stadium: Pankritio Stadium; Attendance: 22,000; Referee: Jan Wegereef (Netherlands)

22 August Friendly	Latvia	1–2	Moldova	Riga, Latvia
	Astafjevs 31'	Report	Frunză 23'; Bordian 53'	Stadium: Skonto Stadium; Attendance: 4,500; Referee: Andriy Shandor (Ukraine)

8 September UEFA Euro 2008 qualifying	Moldova	0–1	Norway	Chişinău, Moldova
		Report; Report (UEFA)	Iversen 49'	Stadium: Stadionul Zimbru; Attendance: 15,000; Referee: Robert Małek (Poland)

12 September UEFA Euro 2008 qualifying	Bosnia and Herzegovina	0–1	Moldova	Sarajevo, Bosnia & Herzegovina
		Report; Report (UEFA)	Bugaev 22'	Stadium: Asim Ferhatović Hase Stadium; Attendance: 4,000; Referee: Jouni Hyytiä (Finland)

13 October UEFA Euro 2008 qualifying	Moldova	1–1	Turkey	Chişinău, Moldova
	Frunză 11'	Report; Report (UEFA)	Ümit 63'	Stadium: Stadionul Zimbru; Attendance: 10,500; Referee: Martin Atkinson (England)

17 October UEFA Euro 2008 qualifying	Malta	2–3	Moldova	Attard, Malta
	Scerri 71'; Mifsud 84' (pen.)	Report; Report (UEFA)	Bugaev 24' (pen.); Frunză 31', 35'	Stadium: Ta' Qali Stadium; Attendance: 10,000; Referee: Igorj Ishchenko (Ukraine)

17 November UEFA Euro 2008 qualifying	Moldova	3–0	Hungary	Chişinău, Moldova
	Bugaev 13'; Josan 23'; Alexeev 86'	Report; Report (UEFA)		Stadium: Stadionul Zimbru; Attendance: 6,483; Referee: Pavel Královec (Czech Republic)

=== 2008 ===
6 February Friendly	Kazakhstan	0–1	Moldova	Antalya, Turkey
		Report	Bugaiov 10'	Stadium: Titanic Stadium; Attendance: 300; Referee: Gerald Lehner (Austria)

24 May Friendly	Croatia	1–0	Moldova	Rijeka, Croatia
	Kovač 30'	Report		Stadium: Stadion Kantrida; Attendance: 7,000; Referee: Darko Čeferin (Slovenia)

28 May Friendly	Moldova	2–2	Armenia	Tiraspol, Moldova
	Arakelyan 25' (o.g.); Alexeev 73'	Report	Pizzelli 25'; Pachadzhyan 54'	Stadium: Sheriff Arena; Attendance: 3,653; Referee: Ihor Ishchenko (Ukraine)

20 August Friendly	Lithuania	3–0	Moldova	Marijampolė, Lithuania
	Poškus 23', 54'; Danilevičius 61'	Report		Stadium: Sūduva Stadium; Attendance: 2,000; Referee: Hannes Kaasik (Estonia)

6 September 2010 FIFA World Cup qualifying	Moldova	1–2	Latvia	Tiraspol, Moldova
	Alexeev 76'	Report; Report (FIFA)	Karlsons 8'; Astafjevs 22'	Stadium: Sheriff Arena; Attendance: 4,300; Referee: Mark Courtney (Northern Ireland)

10 September 2010 FIFA World Cup qualifying	Moldova	1–2	Israel	Chişinău, Moldova
	Picusceac 1'	Report; Report (FIFA)	Golan 39'; Saban 45'	Stadium: Stadionul Zimbru; Attendance: 10,500; Referee: César Muñiz Fernández (Spain)

11 October 2010 FIFA World Cup qualifying	Greece	3–0	Moldova	Piraeus, Greece
	Charisteas 31', 51'; Katsouranis 40'	Report; Report (FIFA)		Stadium: Karaiskakis Stadium; Attendance: 13,684; Referee: Espen Berntsen (Norway)

15 October 2010 FIFA World Cup qualifying	Luxembourg	0–0	Moldova	Luxembourg City, Luxembourg
		Report; Report (FIFA)		Stadium: Stade Josy Barthel; Attendance: 2,157; Referee: Marcin Borski (Poland)

18 November Turniir Linnapeade Karikatele	Estonia	1–0	Moldova	Tallinn, Estonia
	Voskoboinikov 56'	Report		Stadium: A. Le Coq Arena; Attendance: 1,500; Referee: Claus Larsen (Denmark)

19 November Turniir Linnapeade Karikatele	Lithuania	1–1	Moldova	Tallinn, Estonia
	Savėnas 72' (pen.)	Report	Bugaiov 69'	Stadium: A. Le Coq Arena; Attendance: 100; Referee: Kristo Tohver (Estonia)

=== 2009 ===
11 February Friendly	Moldova	1–1	Macedonia	Antalya, Turkey
	Andronic 62'	Report	Pandev 53'	Stadium: World of Wonders Football Centre; Attendance: 300; Referee: Pavel Saliy (Kazakhstan)

28 March 2010 FIFA World Cup qualifying	Moldova	0–2	Switzerland	Chişinău, Moldova
		Report; Report (FIFA)	Frei 32'; Fernandes 90'	Stadium: Stadionul Zimbru; Attendance: 10,500; Referee: Dougie McDonald (Scotland)

1 April 2010 FIFA World Cup qualifying	Switzerland	2–0	Moldova	Geneva, Switzerland
	Nkufo 20'; Frei 52'	Report; Report (FIFA)		Stadium: Stade de Genève; Attendance: 20,100; Referee: Gianluca Rocchi (Italy)

6 June Friendly	Georgia	1–2	Moldova	Tbilisi, Georgia
	Khizanishvili 85'	Report	Sofroni 8'; Suvorov 57'	Stadium: Mikheil Meskhi Stadium; Attendance: 7,000; Referee: Pavel Saliy (Kazakhstan)

10 June Friendly	Belarus	2–2	Moldova	Barysaw, Belarus
	Radyyonaw 4'; Bliznyuk 27'	Report	Calincov 76'; Valeriu Andronic 82'	Stadium: Haradski Stadium; Attendance: 2,000; Referee: Gediminas Mažeika (Lithuania)

12 August Friendly	Armenia	1–4	Moldova	Yerevan, Armenia
	Arakelyan 75'	Report	Golovatenco 35', 62'; Andronic 81'; Epureanu 90' (pen.)	Stadium: Republican Stadium; Attendance: 14,600; Referee: Lasha Silagava (Georgia)

5 September 2010 FIFA World Cup qualifying	Moldova	0–0	Luxembourg	Chişinău, Moldova
		Report; Report (FIFA)		Stadium: Stadionul Zimbru; Attendance: 7,820; Referee: Gediminas Mazeika (Lithuania)

9 September 2010 FIFA World Cup qualifying	Moldova	1–1	Greece	Chişinău, Moldova
	Andronic 90'	Report; Report (FIFA)	Gekas 33'	Stadium: Stadionul Zimbru; Attendance: 9,870; Referee: Daniel Stålhammar (Sweden)

10 October 2010 FIFA World Cup qualifying	Israel	3–1	Moldova	Ramat Gan, Israel
	Barda 22', 70'; Ben Dayan 65'	Report; Report (FIFA)	Calincov 90'	Stadium: Ramat Gan Stadium; Attendance: 8,700; Referee: Kevin Blom (Netherlands)

14 October 2010 FIFA World Cup qualifying	Latvia	3–2	Moldova	Riga, Latvia
	Rubins 32', 44'; Grebis 76'	Report; Report (FIFA)	Ovseannicov 25'; Sofroni 90'	Stadium: Skonto Stadions; Attendance: 3,800; Referee: Jouni Hyytiä (Finland)

== Notes ==
1. The ELO ratings include an away match against Romania B on 24 May 2005 (lost 2–0), which is not included in the above table.

- ^a Turkey were ordered to play three home matches at a neutral ground, behind closed doors after violence in their World Cup Qualifying playoff match against Switzerland on 16 November 2005.
- ^b Greece were ordered to play two matches away from Athens after crowd disturbances in the game against Turkey on 24 March 2007.
