= 2004–05 Slovak Superliga =

Corgoň Liga
- Season: 2004–05
- Dates: 24 July 2004 – 15 June 2005
- Champions: Artmedia Bratislava
- Relegated: Rimavská Sobota
- Champions League: Artmedia Bratislava
- UEFA Cup: MŠK Žilina; Dukla Banská Bystrica
- Intertoto Cup: ZTS Dubnica
- Matches: 180
- Goals: 447 (2.48 per match)
- Top goalscorer: Filip Šebo (22 goals)
- Average attendance: ▼2,327

The 2004–05 Slovak First Football League (known as the Slovak Corgoň Liga for sponsorship reasons) was the 12th season of first-tier football league in Slovakia, since its establishment in 1993. It began on 24 July 2004 and ended on 15 June 2005. MŠK Žilina were the defending champions.

== Teams ==
A total of 10 teams was contested in the league, including 9 sides from the 2003–04 season and one promoted from the 2. Liga.

Relegation for ŠK Slovan Bratislava to the 2004–05 2. Liga was confirmed on 25 May 2004. The one relegated team were replaced by FC Rimavská Sobota.

=== Stadiums and locations ===
Location of teams in 2004–05 Corgoň Liga

Team	Home city	Stadium	Capacity
Artmedia Bratislava	Bratislava	Štadión Petržalka	7,500
FK AS Trenčín	Trenčín	Štadión na Sihoti	4,500
Dukla Banská Bystrica	Banská Bystrica	SNP Stadium	10,000
FK Inter Bratislava	Bratislava	Štadión Pasienky	12,000
Matador Púchov	Púchov	Mestský štadión	6,614
Rimavská Sobota	Rimavská Sobota	Na Zahradkach Stadium	5,000
MFK Ružomberok	Ružomberok	Štadión MFK Ružomberok	4,817
MŠK Žilina	Žilina	Štadión pod Dubňom	11,181
Spartak Trnava	Trnava	Štadión Antona Malatinského	18,448
ZTS Dubnica nad Váhom	Dubnica	Štadión Zimný	5,450

== League table ==
Pos	Team	Pld	W	D	L	GF	GA	GD	Pts	Qualification or relegation
1	Artmedia Bratislava (C)	36	20	12	4	64	28	+36	72	Qualification for Champions League first qualifying round
2	Žilina	36	19	8	9	73	34	+39	65	Qualification for UEFA Cup first qualifying round
3	Dukla Banská Bystrica	36	13	13	10	45	38	+7	52	Qualification for UEFA Cup second qualifying round (Note: Dukla Banská Bystrica qualify for 2005–06 UEFA Cup as winner of 2004–05 Slovak Cup.)
4	ZTS Dubnica	36	13	12	11	42	43	−1	51	Qualification for Intertoto Cup first round
5	Spartak Trnava	36	12	10	14	39	37	+2	46	
6	Matador Púchov	36	12	10	14	31	43	−12	46	
7	Ružomberok	36	11	10	15	50	57	−7	43	
8	Trenčín	36	12	7	17	36	50	−14	43	
9	Inter Bratislava	36	9	11	16	37	60	−23	38	
10	Rimavská Sobota (R)	36	7	11	18	30	57	−27	32	Relegation to 2. Liga

Source: RSSSF.org
Rules for classification: 1) points; 2) goal difference; 3) number of goals scored.
(C) Champions; (R) Relegated

== Results ==
=== First half of season ===
Home \ Away	ART	BB	DUB	INT	PÚC	RIM	RUŽ	TRE	TRN	ŽIL
Artmedia Bratislava		2–1	1–1	2–1	4–0	7–1	1–2	1–0	3–1	1–1
Dukla Banská Bystrica	0–0		3–0	1–2	1–1	3–0	0–0	2–1	4–2	1–1
ZTS Dubnica	1–1	2–2		2–2	2–0	2–0	0–3	1–1	2–0	3–1
Inter Bratislava	1–3	1–4	0–1		0–0	2–2	1–5	1–2	1–1	1–4
Matador Púchov	0–1	0–0	1–2	2–1		2–0	0–1	2–1	3–2	1–0
Rimavská Sobota	0–1	1–1	1–1	1–0	1–1		2–0	2–1	0–0	0–0
Ružomberok	1–1	2–2	0–2	2–2	1–2	4–2		1–1	2–2	2–1
Trenčín	1–0	3–2	0–4	2–0	0–1	1–0	3–0		0–1	4–2
Spartak Trnava	1–0	2–0	3–0	0–0	3–1	1–1	1–2	1–1		0–1
Žilina	5–1	4–0	2–2	1–1	3–0	3–0	6–0	2–2	2–1	

Source: RSSSF.org
Legend: Blue = home team win; Yellow = draw; Red = away team win.

=== Second half of season ===
Home \ Away	ART	BB	DUB	INT	PÚC	RIM	RUŽ	TRE	TRN	ŽIL
Artmedia Bratislava		3–1	1–0	3–1	6–1	2–0	3–1	6–1	0–0	0–0
Dukla Banská Bystrica	0–0		3–1	2–0	2–0	3–2	2–1	1–1	0–0	1–0
ZTS Dubnica	0–2	1–0		0–0	1–1	3–0	3–2	0–0	0–1	0–0
Inter Bratislava	1–1	2–0	3–1		1–0	1–0	2–1	2–0	1–1	0–1
Matador Púchov	1–1	0–0	0–1	1–0		1–1	1–0	3–0	1–0	0–1
Rimavská Sobota	1–1	0–1	1–0	0–1	3–3		3–0	3–0	2–1	0–3
Ružomberok	2–2	0–0	1–2	6–0	0–0	0–0		2–0	0–3	2–3
Trenčín	0–1	0–1	1–1	0–1	2–0	1–0	0–2		2–1	2–1
Spartak Trnava	0–1	1–0	1–0	1–1	1–0	1–0	1–2	1–2		3–1
Žilina	0–1	2–1	5–0	7–3	0–1	5–0	3–0	1–0	1–0	

Source: RSSSF.org
Legend: Blue = home team win; Yellow = draw; Red = away team win.

== Season statistics ==
=== Top scorers ===
Rank	Player	Club	Goals
1	(Slovakia) Filip Šebo	Artmedia Bratislava	22
2	(Slovakia) Ivan Bartoš	Žilina	18
3	(Slovakia) Martin Jakubko	Banská Bystrica	14
4	(Slovakia) Stanislav Šesták	Žilina	13
5	(Slovakia) Juraj Halenár	Inter Bratislava	12
5	(Slovakia) Róbert Semeník	Banská Bystrica	12
7	(Slovakia) Roland Števko	Ružomberok	11
8	(Slovakia) Branislav Fodrek	Artmedia Bratislava	10
9	(Slovakia) Marek Bakoš	Matador Púchov	9
9	(Slovakia) Marián Čišovský	Žilina	9
9	(Slovakia) Ivan Lietava	AS Trenčín	9
9	(Slovakia) Pavol Masaryk	Spartak Trnava	9
9	(Slovakia) Martin Mikulič	Artmedia Bratislava	9
9	(Slovakia) Pavol Straka	ZTS Dubnica	9

== See also ==
- 2004–05 Slovak Cup
- 2004–05 2. Liga (Slovakia)
