= Zlocha =

Zlocha (Slovak feminine: Zlochová) is a surname. Notable people with the surname include:

- Ján Zlocha (1942–2013), Slovak football player
- Ľudovít Zlocha (born 1945), Slovak football player
