= MFK Dukla Banská Bystrica =

Slovak football club

Dukla Banská Bystrica
- Full name: MFK Dukla Banská Bystrica
- Nickname: Vojaci (The Soldiers)
- Founded: 1 July 1965; 61 years ago as VTJ Dukla Banská Bystrica
- Ground: Národný Atletický Štadión
- Capacity: 7,381
- Owner(s): Peter Krnáč (majority); Marek Hamšík (minority)
- President: Milan Smädo
- Coach: Daniel Valach
- League: Slovak First Football League
- 2025–26: 2. Liga, 1st of 16 (promoted)
- Website: mfkdukla.sk
| Home colours | Away colours | Third colours |

MFK Dukla Banská Bystrica (Slovak pronunciation: [ˈdukla ˈbanskaː ˈbistritsa]) is a Slovak professional football club from the town of Banská Bystrica. The club plays at the Národný Atletický Štadión. After being relegated from the Slovak 2. liga in 2017, they had financial problems.

== History ==
=== Early years: 1893–1919 ===
Former logo.

The first mention of football in Banská Bystrica dates back to 1893, but no more precise reports have been preserved from this period. The year 1900 became a historical milestone, when leading representatives of Banská Bystrica officially began to deal with the issue of sports in the city. The proposal to establish a sports club was accepted on 1 April 1900. It was called BSC (Beszterszbányiá Sport Club) and was represented by the cycling, tennis and football departments.

The Banská Bystrica football team officially started its first friendly match on 26 August 1900. Its opponents were guests from Budapest. The match ended 10–1 for the guests and the home team's honorary goal was scored by one of the best players on the field, Kreisner. A year later in Budapest, the Banská Bystrica team left the pitch with a loss, but only by a goal, the match ended 2–1. The football team at that time was coached by Jozef Beran from Budapest. The players themselves paid for the coach, because the club did not have enough money. Football matches and training sessions were held sporadically rather than regularly. In August 1904, the BSC football team met the Budapest team Törekvés SE, over which it won 2–1. In other matches, the Bystrica team was able to defeat leading Hungarian teams such as Šalgótarján 4–0 and Diósgyör 12–1.

=== Historic names ===
- 1965 – Founded as VTJ Dukla Banská Bystrica
- 1967 – Renamed AS Dukla Banská Bystrica
- 1975 – Renamed ASVS Dukla Banská Bystrica
- 1984 – First European qualification, 1985
- 1992 – Renamed FK Dukla Banská Bystrica
- 2017 – Merged with ŠK Kremnička and renamed to MFK Dukla Banská Bystrica

== Honours ==
=== Domestic ===
Czechoslovakia

- Slovak National Football League (1969–1993)
  - Winners (1): 1982–83

Slovakia

- Slovak First Football League (1993–present)
  - Runners-up (1): 2003–04
- Slovak Cup (1961–)
  - Winners (2): 1981, 2005
  - Runners-up (3): 1970, 1984, 1999

=== European ===
- UEFA Intertoto Cup
  - Winners in group (1): 1991

== Affiliated clubs ==
The following club was affiliated with FK Dukla Banská Bystrica:

- (Czech Republic) FC Viktoria Plzeň (2014–2017)

== Sponsorship ==
| Period | Kit manufacturer | Shirt sponsor |
|---|---|---|
| 1998–2000 | Adidas | OVP Orava |
| 2000–2001 | ATAK Sportswear | Národná obroda |
| 2001–2002 | Reebok | FORZA |
| 2002–2003 | ATAK Sportswear | Národná obroda |
| 2003–2004 | ATAK Sportswear | FORZA |
| 2004–2006 | Kappa | PM Zbrojníky |
| 2006–2008 | NIKE | Dôvera |
| 2008–2011 | Adidas | Dôvera |
| 2011–2013 | Adidas | Express Slovakia |
| 2013–2017 | Adidas | none |
| 2017–2019 | NIKE | none |
| 2019–2020 | NIKE | Fajne |
| 2020- | Adidas | Veolia |

== Current squad ==
As of 15 September 2026 Note: Flags indicate national team as defined under FIFA eligibility rules; some limited exceptions apply. Players may hold more than one non-FIFA nationality.

| No. | Pos. | Nation | Player |
|---|---|---|---|
| 1 | GK | CZE | Jakub Trefil |
| 3 | DF | NGR | Alabi Adewale |
| 4 | DF | SVK | Adam Baláž |
| 6 | MF | SVK | Dávid Richtárech |
| 7 | MF | SVK | Jakub Považanec |
| 9 | MF | SVK | Tibor Slebodník |
| 10 | FW | HUN | Regő Szánthó |
| 11 | MF | SVK | Kristián Vallo |
| 13 | DF | SVK | Nicolas Šikula |
| 14 | DF | BRA | João Miranda |
| 15 | MF | SVK | Adrian Sivicek |
| 17 | FW | SVK | Róbert Polievka |
| 19 | MF | SVK | Branko Pinďura |
| 20 | MF | SVK | Dominik Veselovský |

| No. | Pos. | Nation | Player |
|---|---|---|---|
| 23 | DF | SVK | Mikuláš Bakaľa |
| 24 | MF | SVK | Viktor Tóth |
| 25 | FW | NGR | Praisegod Okechukwu |
| 27 | FW | SVK | Nikolas Kubala |
| 28 | MF | MKD | Martin Gjorgievski (on loan from Zbrojovka Brno) |
| 29 | FW | ESP | Enzo Arevalo |
| 31 | GK | SVK | Lukáš Hroššo |
| 36 | GK | SVK | Michal Trnovský |
| 41 | DF | SVK | Ľubomír Willwéber (vice-captain) |
| 42 | DF | BRA | Maik |
| 57 | FW | SVK | Michal Ďuriš |
| 73 | FW | SVK | Adam Hanes |
| 77 | DF | NGR | Kazeem Bolaji |
| 81 | GK | SVK | Michal Lukáč |
| 97 | FW | ESA | Christopher Argueta |

For recent transfers, see List of Slovak football transfers summer 2026

== Staff ==
=== Current technical staff ===
As of 12 June 2025

| Staff | Job title |
|---|---|
| (Slovakia) Daniel Valach | Manager |
| (Slovakia) Marek Bažík | Assistant Manager |
| (Slovakia) Norbert Juračka | Goalkeeping coach |
| (Slovakia) Jozef Mores | Sport director |
| (Slovakia) František Kunzo | Tech. Director |
| (Slovakia) Dušan Šavel | Physiotherapist |
| (Slovakia) Andrej Caban (Slovakia) David Brunn | Fitness coach |
| (Slovakia) Marek Jobko | Team Leader |
| (Slovakia) Peter Straňák (Slovakia) Jakub Bača (Slovakia) Martin Križanský | Doctor |
| (Slovakia) Peter Pošta | Masseur |

== Results ==
=== League and Cup history ===
Slovak League only (1993–2017)

| Season | Division (Name) | Pos./Teams | Pl. | W | D | L | GS | GA | P | Slovak Cup | Europe | | Top Scorer (Goals) |
|---|---|---|---|---|---|---|---|---|---|---|---|---|---|
| 1993–94 | 1st (Mars Superliga) | 9/(12) | 32 | 9 | 9 | 14 | 31 | 43 | 27 | Quarter-finals | | | |
| 1994–95 | 1st (Mars Superliga) | 5/(12) | 32 | 12 | 8 | 12 | 53 | 44 | 44 | Round 1 | | | (Slovakia) Róbert Semeník (18) |
| 1995–96 | 1st (Mars Superliga) | 4/(12) | 32 | 12 | 11 | 9 | 39 | 36 | 47 | Semi-finals | | | (Slovakia) Norbert Toman (6) |
| 1996–97 | 1st (Mars Superliga) | 5/(16) | 30 | 13 | 5 | 12 | 48 | 37 | 44 | Round 2 | | | (Slovakia) Ivan Lapšanský (9) |
| 1997–98 | 1st (Mars Superliga) | 13/(16) | 30 | 7 | 9 | 14 | 32 | 46 | 30 | Quarter-finals | | | (Slovakia) Štefan Rusnák (8) |
| 1998–99 | 1st (Mars Superliga) | 11/(16) | 30 | 8 | 10 | 12 | 34 | 46 | 34 | Runners-up | | | (Slovakia) Štefan Rusnák (11) (Slovakia) Ľubomír Faktor (11) |
| 1999–00 | 1st (Mars Superliga) | 15/(16) | 30 | 7 | 2 | 21 | 27 | 53 | 23 | Semi-finals | UC | 1.R ( (Netherlands) AFC Ajax) | (Slovakia) Ľubomír Faktor (6) |
| 2000–01 | 2nd (1. Liga) | 11/(18) | 34 | 13 | 7 | 14 | 39 | 32 | 46 | Quarter-finals | | | (Slovakia) Eugen Bari (4) (Slovakia) Jaroslav Kamenský (4) |
| 2001–02 | 2nd (1. Liga) | 6/(16) | 30 | 11 | 11 | 8 | 44 | 32 | 44 | Round 1 | | | (Slovakia) Ivan Bartoš (17) |
| 2002–03 | 2nd (1. Liga) | 1/(16) | 30 | 21 | 6 | 3 | 53 | 18 | 69 | Round 1 | | | (Slovakia) Ivan Bartoš (10) |
| 2003–04 | 1st (Corgoň Liga) | 2/(10) | 36 | 17 | 13 | 6 | 58 | 36 | 64 | Round 2 | | | (Slovakia) Róbert Semeník (15) |
| 2004–05 | 1st (Corgoň Liga) | 3/(10) | 36 | 13 | 13 | 10 | 45 | 38 | 52 | Winner | UC | 1.R ( (Portugal) S.L. Benfica) | (Slovakia) Martin Jakubko (14) |
| 2005–06 | 1st (Corgoň Liga) | 6/(10) | 36 | 12 | 6 | 18 | 37 | 42 | 42 | Round 2 | UC | Q2 ( (Poland) Groclin Grodzisk) | (Slovakia) Róbert Semeník (18) |
| 2006–07 | 1st (Corgoň Liga) | 7/(12) | 28 | 7 | 6 | 15 | 24 | 46 | 27 | Quarter-finals | | | (Slovakia) Ivan Lietava (9) |
| 2007–08 | 1st (Corgoň Liga) | 8/(12) | 33 | 10 | 9 | 14 | 41 | 37 | 39 | Round 2 | | | (Slovakia) Michal Ďuriš (6) |
| 2008–09 | 1st (Corgoň Liga) | 10/(12) | 33 | 9 | 8 | 16 | 30 | 39 | 35 | Round 2 | | | (Slovakia) Dušan Uškovič (8) |
| 2009–10 | 1st (Corgoň Liga) | 3/(12) | 33 | 15 | 11 | 7 | 45 | 30 | 56 | Round 2 | | | (Slovakia) Dušan Uškovič (7) |
| 2010–11 | 1st (Corgoň Liga) | 5/(12) | 33 | 13 | 9 | 11 | 39 | 32 | 48 | Round 3 | UC | Q2 ( (Georgia (country)) FC Zestaponi) | (Slovakia) Róbert Pich (7) |
| 2011–12 | 1st (Corgoň Liga) | 9/(12) | 33 | 9 | 10 | 14 | 37 | 44 | 37 | Round 1 | | | (Slovakia) Martin Jakubko (10) |
| 2012–13 | 1st (Corgoň Liga) | 9/(12) | 33 | 9 | 11 | 13 | 28 | 32 | 38 | Quarter-finals | | | (Slovakia) Matúš Turňa (6) |
| 2013–14 | 1st (Corgoň Liga) | 8/(12) | 33 | 11 | 9 | 13 | 48 | 48 | 42 | Round 2 | | | (Slovakia) Pavol Jurčo (8) (Slovakia) Fabián Slančík (8) |
| 2014–15 | 1st (Fortuna Liga) | 12/(12) | 33 | 4 | 10 | 19 | 29 | 57 | 22 | Semi-finals | | | (Slovakia) Patrik Vajda (7) |
| 2015–16 | 2nd (DOXXbet Liga) | 13/(24) | 32 | 16 | 5 | 11 | 45 | 33 | 53 | Round 3 | | | (Netherlands) Endy Opoku Bernadina (7) |
| 2016–17 | 2nd (DOXXbet liga) | 17/(24) | 32 | 10 | 6 | 16 | 36 | 55 | 36 | Round 3 | | | (Slovakia) Radoslav Ďanovský (12) |
| 2017–18 | 3rd (TIPOS III.liga Middle) | 1/(16) | 30 | 21 | 6 | 3 | 60 | 18 | 69 | Did not enter | | | (Slovakia) Lukáš Laksik (17) |
| 2018–19 | 2nd (II. liga) | 6/(16) | 30 | 12 | 10 | 8 | 49 | 35 | 46 | Round 3 | | | (Slovakia) Róbert Polievka (9) |
| 2019–20 | 2nd (II. liga) | 2/(16) | 20 | 14 | 3 | 3 | 52 | 23 | 45 | 1/8 Fin | | | (Slovakia) Róbert Polievka (12) |
| 2020–21 | 2nd (II. liga) | 2/(16) | 28 | 17 | 5 | 6 | 70 | 38 | 56 | Semi-finals | | | (Montenegro) Miladin Vujošević (17) |
| 2021–22 | 2nd (II. liga) | 2/(16) | 30 | 21 | 6 | 3 | 62 | 24 | 69 | Round 3 | | | (Slovakia) Róbert Polievka (18) |
| 2022–23 | 1st (Fortuna Liga) | 5/(12) | 32 | 13 | 5 | 14 | 50 | 56 | 44 | Round of 16 | | | (Slovakia) Róbert Polievka (15) |
| 2023–24 | 1st (Niké Liga) | 7/(12) | 32 | 14 | 9 | 9 | 50 | 41 | 51 | Round 4 | | | (Slovakia) Róbert Polievka (13) |
| 2024–25 | 1st (Niké Liga) | 12/(12) | 32 | 5 | 7 | 20 | 35 | 60 | 22 | Semi-finals | | | (Slovakia) Martin Rymarenko (13) |
| 2025–26 | 2nd (MONACObet liga) | 1/(12) | 30 | 20 | 6 | 4 | 61 | 25 | 66 | Round 4 | | | (Slovakia) Tibor Slebodník (9) |

== European competition history ==
=== UEFA-administered ===
| Season | Competition | Round | Country | Club | Home | Away | Agg. |
|---|---|---|---|---|---|---|---|
| 1984–85 | UEFA Cup | 1 | (Germany) | Mönchengladbach | 2–3 | 1–4 | 3–7 |
| 1999–00 | UEFA Cup | 1 | (Netherlands) | Ajax | 1–3 | 1–6 | 2–9 |
| 2004–05 | UEFA Cup | Q1 | (Azerbaijan) | Qarabağ FK | 3–0 | 1–0 | 4–0 |
| 2004–05 | UEFA Cup | Q2 | (Switzerland) | FC Wil | 3–1 | 1–1 | 4–2 |
| 2004–05 | UEFA Cup | 1 | (Portugal) | Benfica | 0–3 | 0–2 | 0–5 |
| 2005–06 | UEFA Cup | Q2 | (Poland) | Groclin Grodzisk | 0–0 | 1–4 | 1–4 |
| 2010–11 | Europa League | Q2 | (Georgia (country)) | FC Zestaponi | 1–0 | 0–3 | 1–3 |

=== Not UEFA-administered ===
| Season | Competition | Round | Country | Club | Home | Away |
|---|---|---|---|---|---|---|
| 1991 | Intertoto Cup | Group 4 | (Denmark) | Silkeborg IF | 2–0 | 4–1 |
| 1991 | Intertoto Cup | Group 4 | (Sweden) | Hammarby IF | 0–1 | 2–1 |
| 1991 | Intertoto Cup | Group 4 | (Germany) | FC Energie Cottbus | 1–0 | 2–0 |

== Player records ==
=== Most goals ===
| # | Nat. | Name | Goals |
|---|---|---|---|
| 1 | (Slovakia) | **Róbert Polievka** | 80 |
| 2 | (Czechoslovakia) | Milan Nemec | 74 |
| 3 | (Slovakia) | Róbert Semeník | 72 |
| 4 | (Slovakia) | Pavol Diňa | 59 |
| 5 | (Slovakia) | Martin Jakubko | 38 |
| 6 | (Slovakia) | Štefan Rusnák | 34 |
| 7 | (Slovakia) | Martin Rymarenko | 31 |
| 7 | (Slovakia) | Dušan Uškovič | 27 |

Players whose name is listed in bold are still active.

==== Czechoslovak and Slovak Top Goalscorer ====
The Czechoslovak League top scorer from 1944 to 1945 until 1992–93. Since the 1993–94 Slovak League Top scorer.

| Year | Winner | G |
|---|---|---|
| 1968–69 | (Czechoslovakia) Ladislav Petráš | 20 |
| 1994–95 | (Slovakia) Robert Semenik | 18 |
| 2023–24 | (Slovakia) Róbert Polievka | 13^{1} |

^{1}Shared award

== Notable players ==
Had international caps for their respective countries. Players whose name is listed in bold represented their countries while playing for Dukla.

Past (and present) players who are the subjects of Wikipedia articles can be found here.

- (Czechoslovakia) Milan Albrecht
- (Slovakia) Peter Babnič
- (Slovakia) **Marián Bochnovič**
- (Czechoslovakia) Vladimír Borovička
- (Czechoslovakia) Marián Brezina
- (Czechoslovakia) Jozef Bubenko
- (Czechoslovakia) Ivan Bilský
- (Slovakia) Martin Chrien
- (Czechoslovakia) (Slovakia) Miroslav Chvíla
- (Czechoslovakia) Ondrej Daňko
- (Slovakia) Pavol Diňa
- (Slovakia) Ondrej Debnár
- (Slovakia) David Depetris
- (Slovakia) Michal Ďuriš
- (Slovakia) Peter Dzúrik
- (Slovakia) Martin Fabuš
- (Slovakia) Ľubomír Faktor
- (Slovakia) Michal Faško
- (Czechoslovakia) (Slovakia) Peter Fieber
- (Slovakia) Michal Filo
- (Slovakia) Vratislav Greško
- (Slovakia) Norbert Gyömbér
- (Slovakia) Marián Had
- (Slovakia) Andrej Hesek
- (Czechoslovakia) (Slovakia) Viliam Hýravý
- (Slovakia) **Martin Jakubko**
- (Czechoslovakia) **Ladislav Jurkemik**
- (Slovakia) Marek Kaščák
- (Czechoslovakia) **Dušan Keketi**
- (Czechoslovakia) Vladimír Kinier
- (Czech Republic) Jan Kliment
- (Slovakia) Maroš Klimpl
- (Czechoslovakia) **Ján Kocian**
- (North Macedonia) Tihomir Kostadinov
- (Slovakia) **Ivan Kozák**
- (Czechoslovakia) Karel Kula
- (Czechoslovakia) **František Kunzo**
- (Slovakia) Marián Kurty
- (Slovakia) Vladimír Labant
- (Slovakia) Vladimír Leitner
- (Czechoslovakia) (Slovakia) Ľubomír Luhový
- (Slovakia) Filip Lukšík
- (Slovakia) Tomáš Malec
- (Czechoslovakia) Marián Masný
- (Central African Republic) Cyriaque Mayounga
- (Slovakia) Ivan Mesík
- (Czechoslovakia) Pavol Michalík
- (Slovakia) Rastislav Michalík
- (Slovakia) Stanislav Moravec
- (Czechoslovakia) Peter Mráz
- (Czechoslovakia) **Milan Nemec**
- (Slovakia) Martin Obšitník
- (Slovakia) Branislav Obžera
- (Czechoslovakia) **Anton Ondruš**
- (Slovakia) Michal Pančík (born 1971)
- (Slovakia) **Michal Pančík (born 1982)**
- (Slovakia) Viktor Pečovský
- (North Macedonia) Dejan Peševski
- (Slovakia) Marek Penksa
- (Czechoslovakia) Ladislav Petráš
- (Slovakia) Jozef Pisár
- (Czechoslovakia) Ján Pivarník
- (Slovakia) **Róbert Polievka**
- (Slovakia) Martin Poljovka
- (Czechoslovakia) **Jaroslav Pollák**
- (Slovakia) Karol Praženica
- (Slovakia) Štefan Rusnák
- (Slovakia) Kornel Saláta
- (Slovakia) Pavol Sedlák
- (Czechoslovakia) Stanislav Seman
- (Slovakia) Róbert Semeník
- (Slovakia) Ján Solár
- (Slovakia) Miroslav Sovič
- (Slovakia) Zdeno Štrba
- (Slovakia) Tomáš Stúpala
- (Slovakia) Dionatan Teixeira
- (Slovakia) Dušan Tóth
- (Slovakia) Kristián Vallo
- (Slovakia) Dušan Vrťo
- (Slovakia) Tibor Zátek
- (Czechoslovakia) Peter Zelenský
- (Slovakia) **Marián Strelec**

== Managers ==
- (Czechoslovakia) Arnošt Hložek (1966–67)
- (Czechoslovakia) Bohumil Musil (1969–71)
- (Czechoslovakia) Oldřich Bříza (197?–79)
- (Czechoslovakia) Juraj Lakota (1980)
- (Czechoslovakia) Jozef Adamec (1981–87)
- (Czechoslovakia) Anton Dragúň (1987–89)
- (Czechoslovakia) Stanislav Jarábek (1989–91)
- (Czechoslovakia) Jozef Adamec (1991)
- (Czechoslovakia) Anton Hrušecký (1991–9?)
- (Slovakia) Anton Jánoš (1993–95)
- (Slovakia) Ján Ilavský (199?–96)
- (Slovakia) Ján Kocian (1996–97)
- (Slovakia) Peter Benedik (1996–97)
- (Slovakia) Stanislav Jarábek (1998–99)
- (Slovakia) Miloš Tagos (1999–00)
- (Slovakia) Igor Novák (2000–01)
- (Slovakia) Anton Jánoš (2001–03)
- (Slovakia) Ladislav Molnár (2003–04)
- (Czech Republic) Václav Daněk (2004–05)
- (Slovakia) Jozef Prochotský (2005–06)
- (Slovakia) Dušan Radolský (2006)
- (Slovakia) Ladislav Molnár (2007)
- (Slovakia) Štefan Horný (25 Sept 2007 – 27 Aug 2008)
- (Slovakia) Anton Jánoš (26 Aug 2008 – 30 Nov 2008)
- (Slovakia) Jozef Jankech (1 Dev 2008 – 30 June 2010)
- (Slovakia) Karol Marko (1 July 2010 – 8 Nov 2010)
- (Slovakia) Štefan Zaťko (8 Nov 2010 – 30 June 2011)
- (Slovakia) Norbert Hrnčár (1 July 2012 – 9 Oct 2014)
- (Slovakia) Štefan Rusnák (9 Oct 2014 – 26 June 2015)
- (Slovakia) Ľubomír Faktor (26 June 2015 – 18 Oct 2016)
- (Slovakia) Dušan Tóth (18 Oct 2016 – 26 Sep 2018)
- (Slovakia) Stanislav Varga (26 Sep 2018 – 1 July 2022)
- (Czech Republic) Michal Ščasný (2 July 2022 – 25 Oct 2023)
- (Slovakia) Mário Auxt (25 Oct 2023 – 16 Jun 2024)
- (Slovakia) Marek Bažík (16 Jun 2024 – Dec 2024)
- (Slovakia) Martin Poljovka (Dec 2024 – March 2025)
- (Czech Republic) František Straka (March 2025 – May 2025)
- (Slovakia) Juraj Jarábek (May 2025 - August 2026)
- (Slovakia) Daniel Valach (August 2026 - )
