= Peter Benedik =

Slovak footballer (born 1947)

Personal information
- Full name: Peter Benedik
- Date of birth: 21 November 1947 (age 78)
- Place of birth: Košice, Czechoslovakia
- Position: Midfielder

Youth career
- VSS Košice

Senior career*
Years	Team	Apps	(Gls)
- Dukla Banská Bystrica

Managerial career
- Dukla Banská Bystrica (assistant manager)
- Dukla Banská Bystrica B
- 1982–?: Dukla Banská Bystrica (youths manager)
- 1996–1997: Dukla Banská Bystrica
- 2000–2001: Dukla Banská Bystrica (youths manager)
- * Club domestic league appearances and goals as of 15 February 2013

Peter Benedik (born 21 November 1947 in Košice) is a retired football player and coach from Slovakia.

He has been involved in education of players as Peter Dubovský, Václav Němeček, Radek Bejbl, Pavel Nedvěd, Štefan Rusnák and others.
