= Patrik Jacko =

Slovak footballer

Personal information
- Full name: Patrik Jacko
- Date of birth: 26 September 1992 (age 34)
- Place of birth: Prešov, Czechoslovakia
- Height: 1.90 m (6 ft 3 in)
- Position: Centre back

Team information
- Current team: Sitno Banská Štiavnica
- Number: 17

Youth career
- Odeva Lipany
- Tatran Prešov

Senior career*
Years	Team	Apps	(Gls)
2012–2017	Tatran Prešov	132	(9)
2018–2020	Pohronie	57	(2)
2021–	Sitno Banská Štiavnica	55	(7)

International career^{‡}
- Slovakia U15
2010–2011	Slovakia U19	6	(0)
- * Club domestic league appearances and goals as of 09:43, 10 January 2024 (UTC) ‡ National team caps and goals as of 25 May 2011

Patrik Jacko (born 26 September 1992 in Prešov) is a Slovak football defender who currently plays for Sitno Banská Štiavnica.

== Club career ==
Jacko made his Fortuna Liga debut for Tatran Prešov on 5 May 2012, playing the last minute of a 0–2 away loss against AS Trenčín.
