= 2002 FIFA World Cup qualification – UEFA Group 4 =

Football tournament qualification stage

The six teams in this group played against each other on a home-and-away basis. The group winner Sweden qualified for the 17th FIFA World Cup held in South Korea and Japan. The runner-up Turkey advanced to the UEFA Play-off and played against Austria. Sweden went undefeated through the group, conceding just two draws against Turkey and Slovakia: Turkey and Slovakia ran close for second, the positions eventually being decided by Turkey's victory in the second match between the two sides, which ensured that even their subsequent defeat to the Swedes could not keep them out of second place.

== Standings ==
Pos	Team	Pld	W	D	L	GF	GA	GD	Pts	Qualification	Sweden men's national football team	Turkey national football team	Slovakia national football team	North Macedonia national football team	Moldova national football team	Azerbaijan national football team
1	Sweden	10	8	2	0	20	3	+17	26	Qualification to 2002 FIFA World Cup	—	1–1	2–0	1–0	6–0	3–0
2	Turkey	10	6	3	1	18	8	+10	21	Advance to UEFA play-offs	1–2	—	1–1	3–3	2–0	3–0
3	Slovakia	10	5	2	3	16	9	+7	17		0–0	0–1	—	2–0	4–2	3–1
4	Macedonia	10	1	4	5	11	18	−7	7		1–2	1–2	0–5	—	2–2	3–0
5	Moldova	10	1	3	6	6	20	−14	6		0–2	0–3	0–1	0–0	—	2–0
6	Azerbaijan	10	1	2	7	4	17	−13	5		0–1	0–1	2–0	1–1	0–0	—

== Matches ==
2 September 2000
20:45 UTC+5

Azerbaijan	0–1	Sweden
	Report	A. Svensson 9'

Tofiq Bahramov Stadium, Baku
Attendance: 15,000
Referee: Roelof Luinge (Netherlands)
2 September 2000
20:30 UTC+3

Turkey	2–0	Moldova
Okan 45+1'; Emre 75'	Report

Ali Sami Yen Stadium, Istanbul
Attendance: 17,600
Referee: Günter Benkö (Austria)
3 September 2000
20:15 UTC+2

Slovakia	2–0	Macedonia
Balis 3'; Demo 74'	Report

Tehelné pole, Bratislava
Attendance: 4,011
Referee: Alain Hamer (Luxembourg)

6 October 2000
20:00 UTC+2

Macedonia	3–0	Azerbaijan
Hristov 34', 45'; Beqiri 75'	Report

Gradski stadion, Skopje
Attendance: 3,500
Referee: Knud Erik Fisker (Denmark)
7 October 2000
16:00 UTC+2

Sweden	1–1	Turkey
Larsson 69'	Report	Tayfur 90+2' (pen.)

Nya Ullevi, Gothenburg
Attendance: 42,152
Referee: Hellmut Krug (Germany)
7 October 2000
18:00 UTC+3

Moldova	0–1	Slovakia
	Report	S. Németh 79'

Stadionul Republican, Chişinău
Attendance: 3,500
Referee: Fritz Stuchlik (Austria)

11 October 2000
20:00 UTC+5

Azerbaijan	0–1	Turkey
	Report	Şükür 73'

Tofiq Bahramov Stadium, Baku
Attendance: 24,000
Referee: Alan Snoddy (Northern Ireland)
11 October 2000
20:00 UTC+3

Moldova	0–0	Macedonia
	Report

Stadionul Republican, Chişinău
Attendance: 3,000
Referee: Arturo Dauden Ibarra (Spain)
11 October 2000
20:15 UTC+2

Slovakia	0–0	Sweden
	Report

Tehelné pole, Bratislava
Attendance: 11,227
Referee: Hugh Dallas (Scotland)

24 March 2001
16:00 UTC+4

Azerbaijan	0–0	Moldova
	Report

Tofiq Bahramov Stadium, Baku
Attendance: 20,000
Referee: Wolfgang Stark (Germany)
24 March 2001
16:00 UTC+1

Sweden	1–0	Macedonia
A. Svensson 43'	Report

Nya Ullevi, Gothenburg
Attendance: 22,106
Referee: Jan Wegereef (Netherlands)
24 March 2001
20:00 UTC+2

Turkey	1–1	Slovakia
Şükür 55' (pen.)	Report	Tomaschek 68'

Ali Sami Yen Stadium, Istanbul
Attendance: 22,000
Referee: Ryszard Wojcik (Poland)

28 March 2001
17:00 UTC+2

Slovakia	3–1	Azerbaijan
S. Németh 1', 10'; Meszároš 57'	Report	Vasilyev 3' (pen.)

Anton Malatinský Stadium, Trnava
Attendance: 7,994
Referee: Costas Kapitanis (Cyprus)
28 March 2001
20:00 UTC+2

Macedonia	1–2	Turkey
T. Micevski 20'	Report	I. Mitreski 68' (o.g.); Ümit Davala 69'

Gradski stadion, Skopje
Attendance: 8,000
Referee: Claude Colombo (France)
28 March 2001
21:00 UTC+3

Moldova	0–2	Sweden
	Report	Allbäck 86', 90'

Stadionul Republican, Chişinău
Attendance: 7,000
Referee: Laurent Duhamel (France)

2 June 2001
18:00 UTC+2

Sweden	2–0	Slovakia
Allbäck 45', 52'	Report

Råsunda Stadium, Stockholm
Attendance: 34,320
Referee: José María García-Aranda (Spain)
2 June 2001
20:00 UTC+3

Turkey	3–0	Azerbaijan
Tayfun 2'; Oktay 29'; Şükür 4'	Report

İnönü Stadium, Istanbul
Attendance: 17,386
Referee: Juan Ansuátegui Roca (Spain)
2 June 2001
20:00 UTC+2

Macedonia	2–2	Moldova
Šakiri 20' (pen.); M. Krstev 64'	Report	Pogreban 10'; Barburoş 74'

Gradski stadion, Skopje
Attendance: 2,000
Referee: Jack van Hulten (Netherlands)

6 June 2001
19:00 UTC+5

Azerbaijan	2–0	Slovakia
Vasilyev 27'; Tağizade 65'	Report

Tofiq Bahramov Stadium, Baku
Attendance: 10,000
Referee: Nicolai Vollquartz (Denmark)
6 June 2001
20:30 UTC+3

Turkey	3–3	Macedonia
Alpay 43', 58', 75'	Report	Šakiri 7'; Serafimovski 19'; Nikolovski 63'

Bursa Atatürk Stadium, Bursa
Attendance: 18,000
Referee: Pasquale Rodomonti (Italy)
6 June 2001
20:15 UTC+2

Sweden	6–0	Moldova
Larsson 38' (pen.), 57', 67' (pen.), 80' (pen.); Alexandersson 74'; Allbäck 77'	Report

Nya Ullevi, Gothenburg
Attendance: 30,233
Referee: Steve Dunn (England)

1 September 2001
17:30 UTC+3

Moldova	2–0	Azerbaijan
Cleşcenco 19'; Covalciuc 88'	Report

Stadionul Republican, Chişinău
Attendance: 4,800
Referee: Vasiliy Melnichuk (Ukraine)
1 September 2001
19:45 UTC+2

Slovakia	0–1	Turkey
	Report	Şükür 34'

Tehelné pole, Bratislava
Attendance: 8,783
Referee: Vitor Melo Pereira (Portugal)
1 September 2001
20:00 UTC+2

Macedonia	1–2	Sweden
Načevski 63'	Report	Larsson 28'; P. Andersson 33'

Gradski stadion, Skopje
Attendance: 8,000
Referee: Nikolai Levnikov (Russia)

5 September 2001
19:00 UTC+5

Azerbaijan	1–1	Macedonia
İsmayilov 90'	Report	Trajanov 12'

Shafa Stadium, Baku
Attendance: 4,100
Referee: Michael Ross (Northern Ireland)
5 September 2001
20:30 UTC+3

Turkey	1–2	Sweden
Şükür 51'	Report	Larsson 87'; A. Andersson 90+1'

Ali Sami Yen Stadium, Istanbul
Attendance: 22,000
Referee: Stefano Braschi (Italy)
5 September 2001
19:45 UTC+2

Slovakia	4–2	Moldova
P. Németh 54'; S. Németh 59'; Demo 64', 70'	Report	Cleşcenco 11'; Rebeja 76'

Štadión na Sihoti, Trenčín
Attendance: 3,000
Referee: Mikko Vuorela (Finland)

6 October 2001
21:15 UTC+3

Moldova	0–3	Turkey
	Report	Emre Aşık 8'; Nihat 79'; İlhan 83'

Stadionul Republican, Chişinău
Attendance: 5,000
Referee: Frank De Bleeckere (Belgium)
7 October 2001
16:00 UTC+2

Sweden	3–0	Azerbaijan
A. Svensson 52'; Larsson 60' (pen.); Ibrahimović 69'	Report

Råsunda Stadium, Stockholm
Attendance: 32,786
Referee: Ryszard Wojcik (Poland)
7 October 2001
19:00 UTC+2

Macedonia	0–5	Slovakia
	Report	Reiter 28'; Dzúrik 56'; P. Németh 72'; Pinte 80'; Oravec 89'

Gradski stadion, Skopje
Attendance: 3,000
Referee: Mike Riley (England)

== Goalscorers ==
There were 75 goals scored in 30 matches, for an average of 2.5 goals per match.

8 goals

- (Sweden) Henrik Larsson

5 goals

- (Sweden) Marcus Allbäck
- (Turkey) Hakan Şükür

4 goals

- (Slovakia) Szilárd Németh

3 goals

- (Slovakia) Igor Demo
- (Sweden) Anders Svensson
- (Turkey) Alpay Özalan

2 goals

- (Azerbaijan) Vadim Vasilyev
- (North Macedonia) Georgi Hristov
- (North Macedonia) Artim Šakiri
- (Moldova) Serghei Cleşcenco
- (Slovakia) Peter Németh

1 goal

- (Azerbaijan) Fərrux İsmayılov
- (Azerbaijan) Zaur Tağızadə
- (North Macedonia) Argjend Beqiri
- (North Macedonia) Mile Krstev
- (North Macedonia) Toni Micevski
- (North Macedonia) Dragan Načevski
- (North Macedonia) Igor Nikolovski
- (North Macedonia) Žarko Serafimovski
- (North Macedonia) Vančo Trajanov
- (Moldova) Ruslan Barburoş
- (Moldova) Serghei Covalciuc
- (Moldova) Serghei Pogreban
- (Moldova) Radu Rebeja
- (Slovakia) Peter Dzúrik
- (Slovakia) Ľubomír Meszároš
- (Slovakia) Tomáš Oravec
- (Slovakia) Attila Pinte
- (Slovakia) Ľubomír Reiter
- (Slovakia) Róbert Tomaschek
- (Sweden) Niclas Alexandersson
- (Sweden) Andreas Andersson
- (Sweden) Patrik Andersson
- (Sweden) Zlatan Ibrahimović
- (Turkey) Emre Aşık
- (Turkey) Emre Belözoğlu
- (Turkey) Okan Buruk
- (Turkey) Ümit Davala
- (Turkey) Oktay Derelioğlu
- (Turkey) Tayfur Havutçu
- (Turkey) Nihat Kahveci
- (Turkey) Tayfun Korkut
- (Turkey) İlhan Mansız

1 own goal

- (North Macedonia) Goran Stavrevski (against Slovakia)
- (North Macedonia) Igor Mitreski (against Turkey)
