= Rybany =

- Municipality
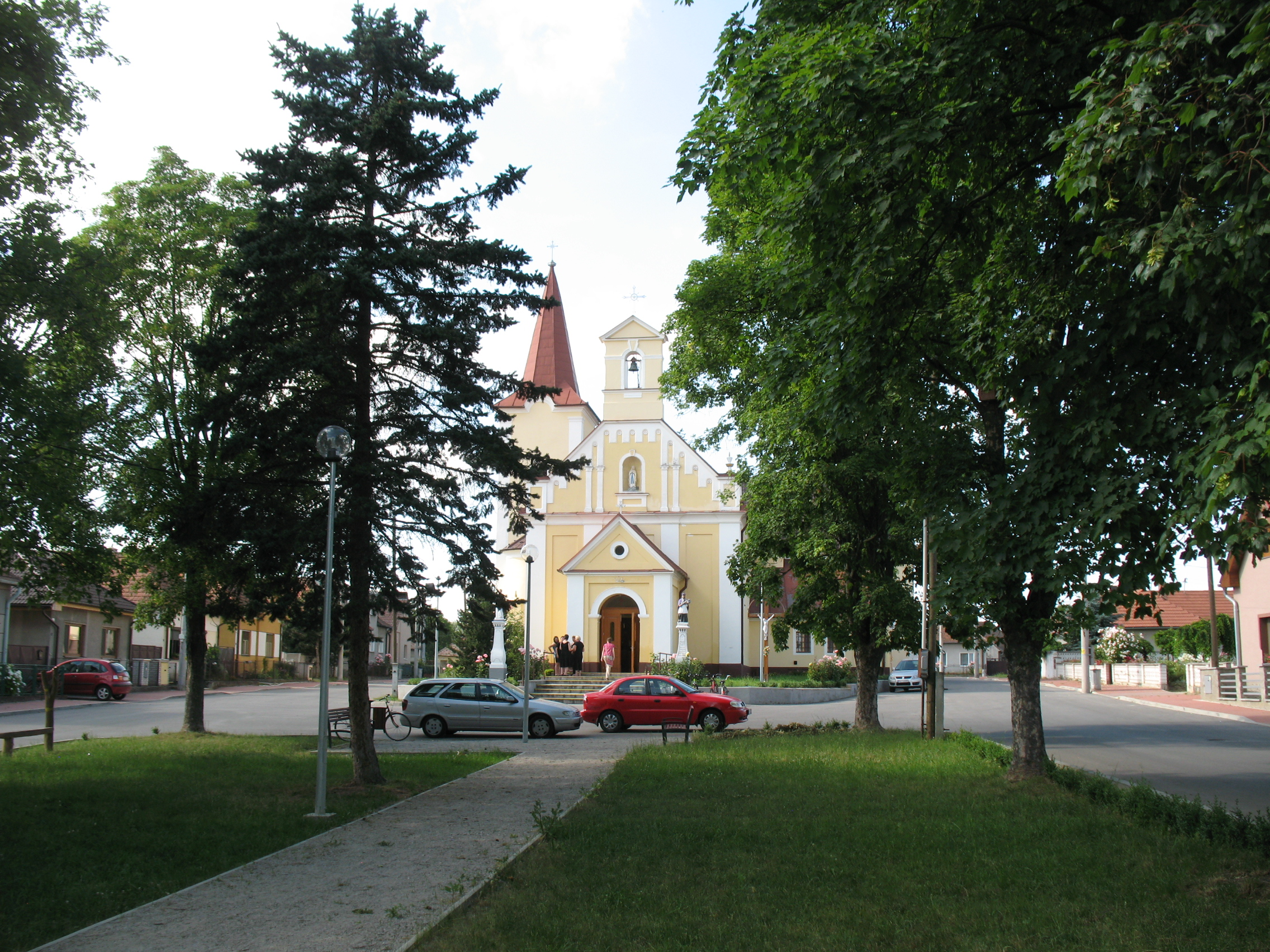

- Flag

- Location of Rybany in the Trenčín Region Location of Rybany in Slovakia
- Coordinates: 48.67°N 18.25°E
- Country: Slovakia
- Region: Trenčín Region
- District: Bánovce nad Bebravou District
- First mentioned: 1323

Area
  - Total: 11.04 km^{2} (4.26 sq mi)
- Elevation: 187 m (614 ft)

Population (2025)
  - Total: 1,490
- Time zone: UTC+1 (CET)
  - Summer (DST): UTC+2 (CEST)
- Postal code: 956 36
- Area code: +421 38
- Vehicle registration plate (until 2022): BN
- Website: www.rybany.sk

Rybany (Hungarian: Ribény) is a village and municipality in Bánovce nad Bebravou District in the Trenčín Region of north-western Slovakia.

== History ==
In historical records the village was first mentioned in 1323.

== Geography ==
The municipality lies at an altitude of 187 metres (614 ft) and covers an area of 11.04 km^{2} (4.26 sq mi) (2025).

== Population ==
Population statistic (10 years)
Year	1995	2005	2015	2025
Count	1502	1496	1454	1490
Difference		−0.39%	−2.80%	+2.47%

Population statistic
Year	2024	2025
Count	1489	1490
Difference		+0.06%

It has a population of 1490 people (31 December 2025).

=== Ethnicity ===
Census 2021 (1+ %)
Ethnicity	Number	Fraction
Slovak	1448	95.45%
Not found out	61	4.02%
Total	1517	

In year 2021 was 1517 people by ethnicity 1448 as Slovak, 61 as Not found out, 8 as Czech, 4 as Romani, 2 as Jewish, 2 as Hungarian, 2 as Canadian, 2 as Other, 1 as Chinese, 1 as Vietnamese, 1 as Serbian and 1 as Polish.

Note on population: The difference values of population numbers in the table "Population statistic" and in the sections "Ethnicity" & "Religion" is caused by the use of various statistical methods.

=== Religion ===
Census 2021 (1+ %)
Religion	Number	Fraction
Roman Catholic Church	1199	79.04%
None	203	13.38%
Not found out	72	4.75%
Evangelical Church	26	1.71%
Total	1517	

In year 2021 was 1517 people by religion 1199 from Roman Catholic Church, 203 from None, 72 from Not found out, 26 from Evangelical Church, 6 from Greek Catholic Church, 3 from Other, 3 from Ad hoc movements, 2 from Other and not ascertained christian church, 1 from Christian Congregations in Slovakia, 1 from Islam and 1 from Buddhism.

== Famous people ==
- Marián Masný, Slovak football player
