= Tomáš Stúpala =

Slovak footballer

Personal information
- Date of birth: 5 May 1966 (age 60)
- Place of birth: Bratislava, Czechoslovakia
- Height: 1.85 m (6 ft 1 in)
- Position: Fullback

Youth career
- Nitra

Senior career*
Years	Team	Apps	(Gls)
1984–1985	Slovan ChZJD Bratislava	7	(0)
1985–1987	Dukla Banská Bystrica	43	(0)
1987–1998	Slovan Bratislava	257	(1)
2000–2001	Svätý Jur		
2001–2004	Tomášov		

International career
1993–1995	Slovakia	14	(0)

Managerial career
- Slovan Bratislava juniori (assistant manager)
- Družstevník Báč
- Dunajská Lužná
- Slovan Bratislava juniori (assistant manager)
- Lamač
- * Club domestic league appearances and goals

Tomáš Stúpala (born 5 May 1966) is a Slovak former footballer.

== Career ==
Stupala made 195 appearances in the Czechoslovak First League between 1984 and 1993, playing for Slovan Bratislava at club level as well as Dukla Banská Bystrica, where he completed two years of military service. He earned 14 caps for the Slovakia national football team from 1994 to 1995, including playing in the first match between the Czech Republic and Slovakia, a 1–1 draw.

== Post-playing career ==
After his retirement from playing, Stupala became a football coach. He was appointed assistant manager of ŠK Slovan Bratislava reserve team in 2008. He later worked as a courier and then in administration for Mercedes-Benz in Zlaté Piesky.
