= Róbert Semeník =

Slovak footballer

Personal information
- Full name: Róbert Semeník
- Date of birth: 13 January 1973 (age 53)
- Place of birth: Veľký Krtíš, Czechoslovakia
- Height: 1.81 m (5 ft 11 in)
- Position: Forward

Youth career
- Veľký Krtíš

Senior career*
Years	Team	Apps	(Gls)
1991–1995	Dukla Banská Bystrica	63	(21)
1995–2000	1. FC Košice	112	(43)
1998–1999	→ Gençlerbirliği (loan)	19	(6)
2000–2001	Teplice	33	(9)
2001–2002	Drnovice	3	(0)
2002–2003	Győr	23	(5)
2003–2007	Dukla Banská Bystrica	143	(50)
2007–2009	Nitra	17	(5)
2009–2010	SV Karlstetten/Neidling		
2010	Družstevník Liptovská Štiavnica		
2011	Spartak Vráble		
2011–	Družstevník Liptovská Štiavnica		
2012	→ LAFC Lučenec (loan)	8	(4)

International career
1995–1997	Slovakia	9	(2)
- * Club domestic league appearances and goals as of 1 June 2012

Róbert Semeník (born 13 January 1973) is a retired Slovak footballer.

Semeník spent two seasons with FC Nitra, appearing in 17 league matches. He is one of the all-time leading goal-scorers among Slovak footballers.

Following the end of his football career in 2012, Semeník became a prison guard.

== Honors ==
- Slovak Super Liga Top Score: 1994–95,1995–96
