= Vladimír Kinier =

Slovak footballer

Personal information
- Date of birth: 6 April 1958 (age 68)
- Place of birth: Žilina, Czechoslovakia
- Height: 1.82 m (6 ft 0 in)
- Position: Defender

Senior career*
Years	Team	Apps	(Gls)
1979–1984	ZVL Žilina		
1984–1985	Dukla Banská Bystrica	28	(0)
1984–1988	ZVL Žilina	86	(9)
1988–1990	Slovan Bratislava	59	(0)
1990–1994	FC Bourges	134	(0)

International career
1984–1990	Czechoslovakia	10	(0)
1984–1988	Czechoslovakia Olympic	8	(0)
- * Club domestic league appearances and goals

Vladimír Kinier (born 6 April 1958) is a Slovak retired football defender who played for Czechoslovakia in the 1990 FIFA World Cup, in which he played one complete match. Between 1979 and 1990, he played 230 matches in the Czechoslovak First League, scoring nine goals. In the 1988–89 season, Kinier was a footballer for Slovan Bratislava team that won the Slovak Cup and played the final of the Czechoslovak Cup.

Kinier was born in Žilina on 6 April 1958. He started playing football in Krásno nad Kysucou and eventually worked his way into the highest leg of the Czechoslovak football team. Kinier made ten for Czechoslovakia and was part of its squad at the 1990 FIFA World Cup. After the match against Italy, he swapped shirts with eventual Golden Boot winner Salvatore Schillaci. He played for Czechoslovakia Olympic football team between 1984 and 1988, making eight appearances without scoring.
