= Vladimír Venglár =

Slovak footballer

Personal information
- Full name: Vladimír Venglár
- Date of birth: 20 February 1923
- Date of death: 5 July 1977 (aged 54)
- Position: Defender

Youth career
- 1935–1941: ŠK Bratislava

Senior career*
| Years | Team | Apps | (Gls) |
| 1941–1952 | ŠK/NV Bratislava | | |
| 1953–1955 | CH Bratislava | | |
| 1956 | Slovan Bratislava | | |

International career
| 1942 | Slovakia | 2 | (0) |
| 1948–1951 | Czechoslovakia | 8 | (0) |
- * Club domestic league appearances and goals

Vladimír Venglár (20 February 1923 – 5 July 1977) was a Slovak footballer who played as a defender and appeared for both the Slovakia and Czechoslovakia national teams.

== Career ==
Venglár made his international debut for Slovakia on 23 August 1942 in a friendly match against Romania, which finished as a 1–0 win in Bratislava. He earned his second and final cap for the country the following month on 6 September in a friendly match against Croatia, which finished as a 1–6 loss in Zagreb. He later represented the Czechoslovakia national team, making his first appearance on 10 October 1948 in the 1948–53 Central European International Cup against Switzerland, which finished as a 1–1 draw in Basel. He was capped eight times for Czechoslovakia, making his final appearance on 20 May 1951 in a friendly against Romania, which finished as a 2–2 draw in Prague.

== Personal life ==
Venglár died on 5 July 1977 at the age of 54.

== Career statistics ==
=== International ===
| Team | Year | Apps | Goals |
|---|---|---|---|
| Slovakia | 1942 | 2 | 0 |
| Slovakia | Total | 0 | 0 |
| Czechoslovakia | 1948 | 1 | 0 |
| Czechoslovakia | 1949 | 3 | 0 |
| Czechoslovakia | 1950 | 3 | 0 |
| Czechoslovakia | 1951 | 1 | 0 |
| Czechoslovakia | Total | 8 | 0 |
| Career total | | 10 | 0 |
