= FK Sitno Banská Štiavnica =

Slovak football club

Sitno Banská Štiavnica
- Full name: Futbalový klub Sitno Banská Štiavnica
- Founded: 1904
- Ground: Stadium FK Sitno
- Chairman: Miroslav Hudák ml.
- Manager: Milan Nemec
- League: 4. Liga
- 2020–21: 1st (promoted)
- Website: www.fksitno.sk

FK Sitno Banská Štiavnica is a Slovak association football club located in Banská Štiavnica. It currently plays in 4. Liga.

== Colors and badge ==
Its colors are white-blue and yellow

== Notable players ==
The following notable players had international caps for their respective countries. Players whose name is listed in bold represented their countries while playing for Sitno Banská Štiavnica.

- (Slovakia) Lukáš Tesák
