= Pavol Sedlák =

Slovak footballer (born 1979)

Personal information
- Date of birth: 21 November 1979 (age 46)
- Place of birth: Bratislava, Czechoslovakia
- Height: 1.75 m (5 ft 9 in)
- Position: Midfielder

Youth career
- Slovan Bratislava

Senior career*
Years	Team	Apps	(Gls)
1997–2003	Slovan Bratislava	152	(13)
2003–2004	Çaykur Rizespor	20	(0)
2004	1.FC Brno	1	(0)
2005	Dukla Banská Bystrica	7	(0)
2005–2006	FC Rimavská Sobota	28	(9)
2006–2008	Slovan Bratislava	56	(5)
2008–2009	→Inter Bratislava loan	32	(10)
2009–2010	→MFK Petržalka loan	28	(1)
2010–2011	→MŠK Rimavská Sobota loan	29	(6)
2011	→FK DAC 1904 Dunajská Streda loan	4	(0)
2011–2012	→MŠK Rimavská Sobota loan	27	(7)
2012	Neusiedl	12	(4)
2013–2014	FC Monchhof		

International career
1998–2000	Slovakia U-21	25	(5)
2000–2006	Slovakia	2	(0)

Managerial career
- 2013–: Slovan Bratislava (assistant manager)
- * Club domestic league appearances and goals as of 30 May 2012

Pavol Sedlák (born 21 November 1979) is a Slovak footballer, currently retired and also was assistant manager in the Slovak giant ŠK Slovan Bratislava. His former clubs were MŠK Rimavská Sobota and ŠK Slovan Bratislava. He previously played for FK DAC 1904 Dunajská Streda. He is a midfielder with a lot of international experience. He is well known for his dribbling ability and super strong shots from medium distances. Together with Samuel Slovák, he was one of the leaders inside the squad of the club.

He previously played for Turkish Süper Lig club Çaykur Rizespor, 1. FC Brno, Dukla Banská Bystrica, FC Rimavská Sobota and Slovan Bratislava.
