= Pavol Michalík =

Slovak footballer (born 1951)

Pavol Michálik
Personal information
- Full name: Pavol Michálik
- Date of birth: 29 November 1951 (age 74)
- Place of birth: Czechoslovakia
- Position: Goalkeeper

Senior career*
Years	Team	Apps	(Gls)
–1974	Dukla Banská Bystrica		
1974–1984	FC Baník Ostrava	194	(0)
1984–1985	ŠK Slovan Bratislava	15	(0)
1986–1991	Panserraikos	61	(0)

International career
1976–1978	Czechoslovakia	11	(0)
- * Club domestic league appearances and goals

Pavol Michálik (born 29 November 1951) was a former Slovak football goalkeeper. He played for Dukla Banská Bystrica, FC Baník Ostrava and ŠK Slovan Bratislava. His surname was written wrong in his career life as Michalík.

== Club career ==
Michálik played in 209 Czechoslovak First League matches, most of them with FC Baník Ostrava. He won the Czechoslovak First League three times with Baník, in 1976, 1980 and 1981. He finished his career with Panserraikos in the Super League Greece.

== International career ==
Michálik made eleven appearances for the full Czechoslovakia national football team.
