= Michal Benedikovič =

Slovak footballer (1923–2007)

Personal information
- Full name: Michal Benedikovič
- Date of birth: 31 May 1923
- Date of death: 18 April 2007 (aged 83)
- Position: Midfielder

Senior career*
Years	Team	Apps	(Gls)
1945–1950	TSS Trnava		
1951–1956	Slovan Bratislava		
1957–1958	Spartak Trnava		

International career
1949–1952	Czechoslovakia	7	(0)
- * Club domestic league appearances and goals

Michal Benedikovič (31 May 1923 – 18 April 2007) was a Slovak football player. He played for Czechoslovakia, for which he played 7 matches.

He was part of the Czechoslovakia squad at the 1954 FIFA World Cup but did not play in the tournament.

Benedikovič played club football for Spartak Trnava and Slovan Bratislava, with whom he won two Czechoslovak First League titles in 1951 and 1955.
