= Miloš Soboňa =

Slovak footballer

Personal information
- Full name: Miloš Soboňa
- Date of birth: 25 November 1975 (age 50)
- Place of birth: Levice, Czechoslovakia
- Height: 1.86 m (6 ft 1 in)
- Position: Defender

Youth career
- 1985–1991: Levice
- 1991–1993: Slovan Bratislava

Senior career*
Years	Team	Apps	(Gls)
1993–2001	Slovan Bratislava	132	(8)
2001–2002	Bursaspor	10	(0)
2002–2004	Artmedia Petržalka	21	(1)
Total		163	(9)

International career
1995–1997	Slovakia U21	10	(1)
1995–2000	Slovakia	3	(0)
- * Club domestic league appearances and goals

Miloš Soboňa (born 25 November 1975) is a former Slovak international football defender who played for clubs in Slovakia and Turkey.

== Career ==
Born in Levice, Soboňa began playing football for the youth team of local side of Slovan Levice. He started playing for the youth team of ŠK Slovan Bratislava in 1991 and would join the senior side in 1993. He would win four Slovak championships and three Slovak Cups with the club.

In September 2001, Soboňa moved to Turkey where he would make 10 Süper Lig appearances in a brief stint with Bursaspor. He returned to Slovakia to play two more seasons with FC Artmedia Petržalka before retiring.

Artmedia did not count on him for the second half of the 2003–04 season. As a free agent he spent a week on trial with the Hungarian club Ferencváros in January 2004, but coach Attila Pintér did not sign him. Soboňa ended his playing career in 2004, aged 28. His agent Karol Csontó said that knee problems were one of the reasons and that Soboňa had gone into business.

Soboňa made three appearances for the senior Slovakia national football team, including one 2002 FIFA World Cup qualifying match. He made his debut on 16 August 1995 in a match against Azerbaijan.
