= Ivan Bartoš (footballer) =

Slovak footballer

Personal information
- Full name: Ivan Bartoš
- Date of birth: 25 April 1977 (age 49)
- Place of birth: Czechoslovakia
- Height: 1.81 m (5 ft 11 1/2 in)
- Position: Centre forward

Team information
- Current team: TUS Gross St. Florian

Senior career*
Years	Team	Apps	(Gls)
- Banská Bystrica
- Ružomberok
- Agios Nikolaos
2000	Olomouc	0	(0)
?–2004	Banská Bystrica		
2004–2009	Žilina	?	(24)
2007–2008	Zlaté Moravce		
2008–2009	Podbrezová		
2009–2011	SC Deutschlandsberg		
2011–	TUS Gross St. Florian		

International career
- Slovakia U-19
- * Club domestic league appearances and goals as of 6 April 2012

Ivan Bartoš (born 25 April 1977) is a Slovak football striker who currently plays for TUS Gross St. Florian.
