= Serghei Pogreban =

Moldovan footballer

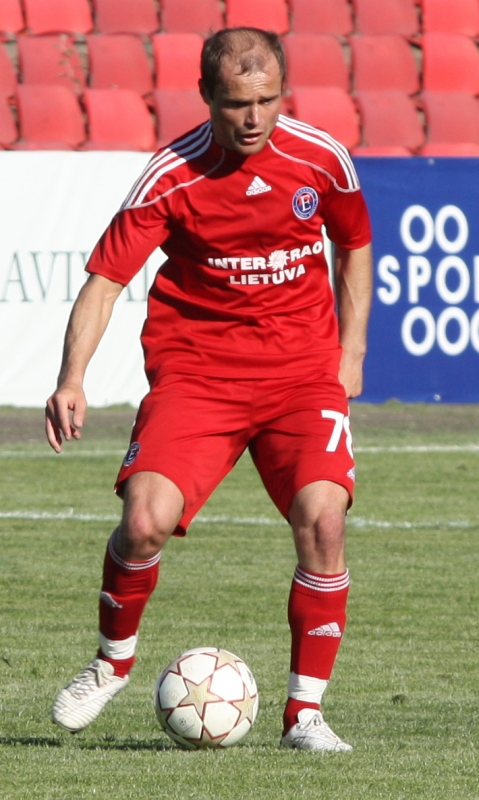

Personal information
- Date of birth: 13 May 1978 (age 48)
- Height: 1.75 m (5 ft 9 in)
- Position: Forward

Senior career*
Years	Team	Apps	(Gls)
1998–1999	Constructorul Chişinău	3	(0)
1999–2002	CS Tiligul-Tiras Tiraspol	86	(21)
2002–2005	FC Nistru Otaci	77	(11)
2005–2006	FC Zhetysu	12	(0)
2006–2010	FK Ekranas	137	(16)
2012–2013	Olimpia Bălți	20	(2)
2013–	Dinamo-Auto Tiraspol	18	(0)

International career^{‡}
2001–2004	Moldova	13	(1)
- * Club domestic league appearances and goals as of 17 December 2009 ‡ National team caps and goals as of 24 January 2010

Serghei Pogreban (born 13 May 1978) is a Moldovan football forward currently unattached after end of contract with FK Ekranas.

Pogreban made 13 appearances for the Moldova national football team from 2001 to 2004.

== International goal ==
Scores and results list Moldova's goal tally first.

No	Date	Venue	Opponent	Score	Result	Competition
1.	2 June 2001	Gradski stadion, Skopje, Macedonia	Macedonia	1–0	2–2	2002 World Cup qualifier
