= Tomáš Porubský =

Slovak footballer (1914–1973)

Personal information
- Full name: Tomáš Porubský
- Date of birth: 2 September 1914
- Place of birth: Bratislava, Austria-Hungary
- Date of death: 19 June 1973 (aged 58)
- Position: Midfielder

Senior career*
Years	Team	Apps	(Gls)
- SK Baťa Zlín
1936–1937	Teplitzer FK		
- Moravská Slavia
193?–1942	ŠK Bratislava		
1943–194?	ŠK ASO Bratislava		

International career
1937	Czechoslovakia	1	(0)
1939–1943	Slovakia	14	(0)
- * Club domestic league appearances and goals

Tomáš Porubský (2 September 1914 – 19 June 1973) was a Slovak footballer who played as a midfielder and appeared for both the Czechoslovakia and Slovakia national teams.

== Career ==
Porubský earned his first and only cap for Czechoslovakia on 23 May 1937 in the 1936–38 Central European International Cup against Italy, which finished as a 0–1 loss in Prague. He later represented the Slovakia national team, making his first appearance on 3 December 1939 in a friendly match against Germany, which finished as a 1–3 loss in Chemnitz. He was capped 14 times for Slovakia, making his final appearance on 13 June 1943 in a friendly against Romania, which finished as a 2–2 draw in Bucharest.

== Personal life ==
Porubský died on 19 June 1973 at the age of 58.

== Career statistics ==
=== International ===
Team	Year	Apps	Goals
Czechoslovakia	1937	1	0
Czechoslovakia	Total	1	0
Slovakia	1939	1	0
Slovakia	1940	2	0
Slovakia	1941	4	0
Slovakia	1942	4	0
Slovakia	1943	3	0
Slovakia	Total	14	0
Career total		15	0
