= Peter Dzúrik =

Slovak footballer (1968–2010)

Personal information
- Date of birth: 29 December 1968
- Place of birth: Košice, Czechoslovakia
- Date of death: 9 September 2010 (aged 41)
- Place of death: Bratislava, Slovakia
- Height: 1.80 m (5 ft 11 in)
- Positions: Centre-back; defensive midfielder

Youth career
- Košická Nová Ves
- ZŤS Košice

Senior career*
Years	Team	Apps	(Gls)
1986–1988	ZŤS Košice	19	(0)
1988–1990	Dukla Znojmo		
1990–1993	ZŤS Košice		
1993–1997	Chemlon Humenné	99	(8)
1997–2000	1. FC Košice	101	(11)
2000–2002	Inter Bratislava	69	(10)
2002–2003	Slovan Bratislava	45	(7)
2003–2005	Dukla Banská Bystrica	29	(1)

International career
1997–2003	Slovakia	45	(2)

Managerial career
- 2007: Dukla Banská Bystrica
- * Club domestic league appearances and goals

Peter Dzúrik (29 December 1968 – 9 September 2010) was a Slovak professional footballer who played as a centre-back or defensive midfielder. He played 45 matches and scored two goals for the Slovakia national team.

== Club career ==
Dzúrik, native of Košice, began playing football in district Košická Nová Ves and he moved to ZŤS Košice at the age of 17. He made his first team debut for ZŤS in the 1986–87 season. The next season, he established himself in the team, playing 16 matches. After soldiership in Znojmo he came back to ZŤS but he did not play many matches due to injury. He moved to Chemlon Humenné in 1993 and he won the Slovak Cup for club in 1996. He signed for 1. FC Košice in January 1997 and helped them win the first Slovak title ever and qualify to the 1997–98 UEFA Champions League group stage as first Slovak team ever. Dzúrik, already the national team member, transferred to Inter Bratislava in summer 2000, where he spent two years and won twice double. He ended his career in Dukla Banská Bystrica. After playing career he was coaching youth and shortly senior team of Dukla.

== International career ==
Dzúrik made his international debut for Slovakia on 11 March 1997 in a friendly game against Bulgaria.

== Death ==
Dzúrik succumbed to a brain tumour on 9 September 2010. He was divorced and had a son named Jakub.

== Career statistics ==
Scores and results list Slovakia's goal tally first.

#	Date	Venue	Opponent	Score	Result	Competition
1.	11 June 2000	Miyagi Stadium, Rifu, Japan	Japan	1–0	1–1	2000 Kirin Cup
2.	7 October 2001	Philip II Arena, Skopje, Macedonia	Macedonia	2–0	5–0	2002 FIFA World Cup qualification

== Honours ==
Humenné

- Slovak Cup: 1995–96

1. FC Košice

- Corgoň Liga: 1996–97, 1997–98
- Slovak Super Cup: 1997

Inter

- Corgoň Liga: 1999–2000, 2000–01
- Slovak Cup: 1999–2000, 2000–01

Individual

- Slovak Super Liga Team of the Season: 2002–03
