= Milan Nemec =

Slovak football manager

Personal information
- Full name: Milan Nemec
- Date of birth: 14 January 1959 (age 67)
- Place of birth: Rudno nad Hronom, Czechoslovakia
- Position: Left winger

Team information
- Current team: Sitno Banská Štiavnica

Youth career
- ŠK Rudno nad Hronom
- Nová Baňa
- Žiar nad Hronom

Senior career*
Years	Team	Apps	(Gls)
1976–1977	Slovan Bratislava	10	(0)
1977–1978	VSS Košice	4	(0)
1979	Žiar nad Hronom	18	(8)
1979–1990	Dukla Banská Bystrica	294	(74)
1990	Rot-Weiß Erfurt	12	(1)
1991–1992	SC Wielsbeke	?	(?)
1993–1994	USC Fels/Wagram	?	(?)
1994–1995	Nová Baňa	9	(1)
1995–1998	Ebreichsdorf	53	(12)
1999–2001	Železiarne Podbrezová	33	(10)
Total		433	(108)

International career
1985	Czechoslovakia	2	(0)

Managerial career
- 1994–1995: Nová Baňa (Playing-manager)
- 1995–1998: Ebreichsdorf (Playing-manager)
- 1998–2001: Železiarne Podbrezová (Playing-manager)
- 2000–2001: Žilina (Assistant)
- 2005–2006: Žilina (Assistant)
- 2005: Žilina
- 2006: Žilina (Assistant)
- 2006–2008: ViOn Zlaté Moravce (Assistant)
- 2008–2010: Senica (Assistant)
- 2017–2019: Pohronie
- 2021–: Sitno Banská Štiavnica
- * Club domestic league appearances and goals

Milan Nemec (born 14 January 1959) is a former Slovak football player and most recently a manager of Železiarne Podbrezová U19 team. He played for Czechoslovakia, for which he played 2 times.

Nemec is remembered for scoring two goals against Borussia Mönchengladbach in a 1984–85 UEFA Cup first round, first leg fixture, played at Štiavničky, in a 2–3 defeat.

== Personal life ==
His son Adam Nemec is also footballer. Adam Nemec is a former Slovakia national team striker, a leading national team goalscorer and he competed in numerous top leagues across Europe. Adam Nemec currently plays for Voluntari. Nemec also has a younger son named Andrej, who plays football in Austria.

== Honours ==
=== Player ===
Dukla Banska Bystrica

- Slovak Cup: 1981
- Czechoslovak Second League - Top scorer: 1982–83 (22 goals)

=== Manager ===
Železiarne Podbrezová

- 3. Liga: 1997–98 (Promoted)

Pohronie

- 2. Liga: 2018–19 (Promoted)
