= FC Družstevník Báč =

- Full name: FC Družstevník Báč
- Founded: 1970
- Dissolved: 2006
- Ground: Stadium Báč, Báč, Slovakia
- Capacity: 2,200 (850 seats)
Home colours

FC Družstevník Báč was a Slovak association football club located in Báč, Slovakia. The club was a participant in the Slovak Second Level, making Báč the smallest village to be represented at the second level of any world football league.

== History ==
The club played in the third tier of Slovak football, beating FK Rača in their playoff semi-final in July 2003. They subsequently won promotion to the 2. Liga after defeating REaMOS Kysucký Lieskovec in the playoff final the same month. After playing three seasons in the second level of Slovak football, the club finished second-last in the 2005–06 2. Liga and were relegated. Družstevník Báč was due to play in the West Group of the third tier in the 2006–07 season, but formally withdrew in July 2006 shortly before the start of the season, citing financial limitations.

== Team Colours ==
The team played in an all-white kit.

== Former managers ==
- Miroslav Mentel
- Jozef Obert
- Dušan Liba
- Róbert Paldan
- Vladimír Kinier
- Ľubomír Lauko
