= Marián Masný =

Slovak footballer

Personal information
- Date of birth: 13 August 1950 (age 76)
- Place of birth: Rybany, Czechoslovakia
- Height: 1.78 m (5 ft 10 in)
- Position: Winger

Senior career*
Years	Team	Apps	(Gls)
1970–1972	Dukla Banská Bystrica		
1972–1983	Slovan Bratislava	318	(97)
1983–1984	SC Neusiedl am See		
1984–1985	ZŤS Petržalka		

International career
1974–1982	Czechoslovakia	75	(18)
Medal record
Representing Czechoslovakia
UEFA European Championship
Winner	1976 Yugoslavia
- * Club domestic league appearances and goals

Marián Masný (born 13 August 1950 in Rybany) is a Slovak former football player. He played for Czechoslovakia, for which he played 75 matches and scored 18 goals. His brother Vojtech was also football player.

He was a participant at the 1976 UEFA European Championship, where Czechoslovakia won the gold medal, and at the 1980 UEFA European Championship where they came third and at the has a sticker in the album of the 1982 FIFA World Cup.

Masný started out at amateur football clubs Jednota Trenčin and then Dukla Banska Bystrica before joining professional team played Slovan Bratislava. He played most of his career for Slovan Bratislava from 1968 to 1989 and also played briefly for Petržalka before he retired in 1990.

Kevin Keegan described Masný as "one of the world's most skilful wingers". Masný assisted both his team's goals in a 2-1 win against Keegan's England team in Bratislava, 1975 in a European championship qualifying game.

== Honours ==
- Czechoslovak First League Winners (2): 1974 & 1975.
- Slovenský Pohár Winners (6): 1972, 1974, 1976, 1982, & 1983.
- Czechoslovak Cup Winners (2): 1974 & 1982.
- Ciutat de Barcelona Trophy Winner (1): 1974.
- UEFA Euro Winner (1): 1976.
