= Serghei Covalciuc =

Moldovan footballer

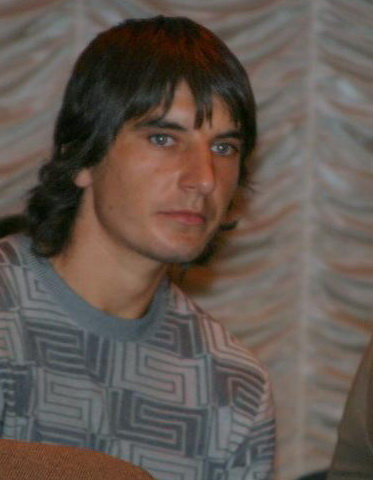
- Covalciuc in 2008

Personal information
- Birth name: Serhiy Serhiyovych Kovalchuk
- Date of birth: 20 January 1982 (age 44)
- Place of birth: Odesa, Ukrainian SSR, Soviet Union
- Height: 1.82 m (5 ft 11 1/2 in)
- Position: Midfielder

Senior career*
Years	Team	Apps	(Gls)
1998–2002	Tiligul Tiraspol	77	(7)
2002–2004	Karpaty Lviv	72	(4)
2002	→ Karpaty-2 Lviv	2	(1)
2004–2009	Spartak Moscow	90	(2)
2010	Tom Tomsk	25	(0)
2011	Zhemchuzhina-Sochi	13	(0)
2011–2012	Chornomorets Odesa	11	(0)
2012–2013	Aktobe	24	(2)
Total		314	(16)

International career
2001–2012	Moldova	41	(2)
- * Club domestic league appearances and goals

Serghei Covalciuc (Ukrainian: Сергій Сергійович Ковальчук, romanized: Serhiy Serhiyovych Kovalchuk; born 20 January 1982) is a Moldovan former footballer.

== Career ==
He spent six seasons playing for Spartak Moscow in the Russian Premier League. Previously he played for Tiligul Tiraspol in Moldovan championship, having joined them in the 1999 pre-season. His contract with Spartak ended in 2009.

An Odesa native, Serghei Covalciuc previously had Moldovan and Transnistrian (de facto nation) citizenships, but, in 2007, he renounced them to receive Russian citizenship and be able to play more often for Spartak. On 23 February 2010, Tom Tomsk signed Covalciuc on a free transfer and on a two-year deal.

After playing for half-a-season for FC Zhemchuzhina-Sochi in the Russian First Division in 2011, Covalciuc transferred to his home-city team Chornomorets Odesa in the Ukrainian Premier League on 29 August 2011.

=== Position ===
He plays several positions on the field. He is primarily an attacking midfielder, and also plays as a second striker, defensive midfielder, winger, or full-back.

== International career ==
Covalciuc made 41 appearances for the Moldovan senior squad, including three games in UEFA Euro 2008 qualifying. He also played eight games in 2006 FIFA World Cup qualification (UEFA) and was a member of 2002 edition.

He played his last official match against Turkey on 11 October 2006 before denaturalization of his Moldovan nationality. In 2012, he was recalled to the national team, making a further seven appearances.

=== International goals ===
Scores and results list Moldova's goal tally first.

No	Date	Venue	Opponent	Score	Result	Competition
1.	1 September 2001	Stadionul Republican, Chişinău, Moldova	Azerbaijan	2–0	2–0	2002 World Cup qualifier
2.	10 September 2003	Sheriff Stadium, Tiraspol, Moldova	Belarus	2–0	2–1	Euro 2004 qualifier

== Personal life ==
Covalciuc's brother, Chiril Covalciuc, was also a professional footballer who also played for Chornomorets. Prior to that, they also played together for Russian club Tom Tomsk.
