= Národná obroda =

Daily newspaper in Slovakia (1990–2015)

- Type: Daily newspaper
- Format: Broadsheet
- Founded: 1990
- Language: Slovak
- Ceased publication: 31 May 2015
- Headquarters: Bratislava
- Country: Slovakia
- ISSN: 1335-4671
- OCLC number: 233144476

Národná obroda (Slovak: National Revival) was a daily newspaper published in Bratislava, Slovakia, between 1990 and 2005.

== History and profile ==
Národná obroda was established through the initiative of the Slovak government in 1990. The paper had its headquarters in Bratislava. It became a respected daily with accurate and in-depth commentaries after its publication. The paper was published in broadsheet format.

Tatiana Repkova served as the publisher and editor-in-chief of the paper. On 15 November 1996, she was removed from both posts. Some of the journalists also left the paper in protest over her dismissal. During this period, the paper's owner was an export company, the VSZ steel mill.

In Spring 1999, Národná obroda was acquired by the NO Publishing company. Following its restructuring, the paper had about 130,000 readers in August 1999. The frequency of the paper was also changed. It was published seven days per week until October 1999, when it began to be published daily except Sundays.

In the early 2000s, Národná obroda was close to the Alliance of the New Citizen party. The paper had a centrist leaning. In 2003, it was among the top ten dailies in the country and had a circulation of 18,000 copies. The publisher was the Výhra company during this period.

Národná obroda ceased publication on 31 May 2005.
