= 2005–06 2. Liga (Slovakia) =

2. liga
- Season: 2005–06
- Champions: MFK Košice
- Promoted: MFK Košice; ŠK Slovan Bratislava; FC Senec
- Relegated: ŠK Odeva Lipany; FC Spartak Trnava B; FC Družstevník Báč; FC Nitra B
- Matches: 240
- Goals: 605 (2.52 per match)

The 2005–06 season of the Slovak Second Football League (also known as 2. liga) was the thirteenth season of the league since its establishment. It began on 22 July 2005 and ended on 28 May 2006.

== League standing ==
Pos	Team	Pld	W	D	L	GF	GA	GD	Pts	Promotion or relegation
1	MFK Košice (C, P)	30	23	4	3	67	12	+55	73	Promotion to Corgoň Liga
2	Slovan Bratislava (P)	30	19	6	5	47	25	+22	63	Promotion to Corgoň Liga
3	FC Senec (P)	30	19	3	8	65	35	+30	60	Promotion to Corgoň Liga
4	Tatran Prešov	30	15	7	8	37	22	+15	52	
5	LAFC Lučenec	30	15	7	8	40	34	+6	52	
6	Rimavská Sobota (Note: 6 points deducted.)	30	17	5	8	49	23	+26	50	
7	Zemplín Michalovce	30	14	6	10	38	30	+8	48	
8	ViOn Zlaté Moravce	30	14	6	10	33	25	+8	48	
9	Slovan Duslo Šaľa	30	13	6	11	42	29	+13	45	
10	Podbrezová	30	12	8	10	39	30	+9	44	
11	1. HFC Humenné	30	10	7	13	35	45	−10	37	
12	DAC 1904 Dunajská Streda	30	7	6	17	27	51	−24	27	
13	Odeva Lipany (R)	30	6	4	20	27	61	−34	22	Relegation to 2. Liga
14	Spartak Trnava B (R)	30	4	5	21	17	56	−39	17	Relegation to 2. Liga
15	Družstevník Báč (R)	30	3	7	20	17	63	−46	16	Relegation to 2. Liga
16	FC Nitra B (R)	30	4	3	23	25	64	−39	15	Relegation to 2. Liga

Source: RSSSF.org
Rules for classification: 1) points; 2) goal difference; 3) number of goals scored.
(C) Champions; (P) Promoted; (R) Relegated

== See also ==
- 2005–06 Slovak Superliga
