= Štefan Rusnák =

Slovak footballer

Personal information
- Full name: Štefan Rusnák
- Date of birth: 7 August 1971 (age 55)
- Place of birth: Trstená, Czechoslovakia
- Height: 1.80 m (5 ft 11 in)
- Position: Forward

Senior career*
Years	Team	Apps	(Gls)
1989–1991	Banská Bystrica	30	(15)
1991–1994	Slavia Prague	59	(7)
1992	→ Bohemians 1905 (loan)	8	(0)
1994–1997	Slovan Bratislava	60	(12)
1997	1. FC Košice	1	(0)
1997–1999	Banská Bystrica	51	(19)
1999–2001	BV Cloppenburg	63	(23)
2001–2002	VfB Oldenburg		
2002–2003	Žilina	23	(4)
2004	Podbrezová	14	(0)

International career
1994–1995	Slovakia	7	(1)

Managerial career
- 2014–2015: Banská Bystrica
- 2018-: Banská Bystrica (assistant)
- * Club domestic league appearances and goals as of 26 June 2015

Štefan Rusnák (born 7 August 1971) is a former Slovak international football forward who played for clubs in Czechoslovakia and Germany and recently manager of FK Dukla Banská Bystrica.

== Career ==
Rusnák began playing football for FK Dukla Banská Bystrica. After spending most of his career in the former Czechoslovakia, playing for Dukla Banská Bystrica, SK Slavia Prague and ŠK Slovan Bratislava, he moved to Germany to play in the lower leagues for BV Cloppenburg and VfB Oldenburg. He had an unsuccessful trial with FC St. Pauli in 1990.

On 3 October 1993, he scored a "scissors" goal against RH Cheb as a footballer of Slavia Prague, which was nominated for the most beautiful goal of the Czech First League in 2013.
