= Ján Zlocha =

Slovak footballer

Personal information
- Full name: Ján Zlocha
- Date of birth: 24 March 1942
- Place of birth: Bratislava, Slovakia
- Date of death: 1 July 2013 (aged 71)
- Place of death: Bratislava, Slovakia
- Position: Defender

Senior career*
Years	Team	Apps	(Gls)
1964	Slovan Bratislava	3	(0)
1964-1966	Spartak Trnava	43	(3)
1966-1967	Dukla Prague	13	(0)
1967-1968	Spartak Trnava	18	(0)
1968-1973	Slovan Bratislava	122	(4)

International career
1969–1970	Czechoslovakia	4	(0)
- * Club domestic league appearances and goals

Ján Zlocha (24 March 1942 in Bratislava – 1 July 2013) was a Slovak football player. He played for Czechoslovakia, for which he played 4 matches.

He was a participant at the 1970 FIFA World Cup, where he played in a match against Romania.

He played mostly for Slovan Bratislava, Spartak Trnava and Dukla Prague. His brother Ľudovít was also a successful footballer.
