= Ľudovít Zlocha =

Slovak footballer

Personal information
- Full name: Ľudovít Zlocha
- Date of birth: 17 May 1945 (age 81)
- Place of birth: Kopčany-Bratislava, Slovakia
- Position: Defender

International career
Years	Team	Apps	(Gls)
1971–1973	Czechoslovakia	12	(0)

Ľudovít Zlocha (born 17 May 1945) is Slovak retired international football player. He played 12 matches for Czechoslovakia.

His brother, Ján was also a Czechoslovakia international footballer.
