= Peter Németh =

Slovak footballer

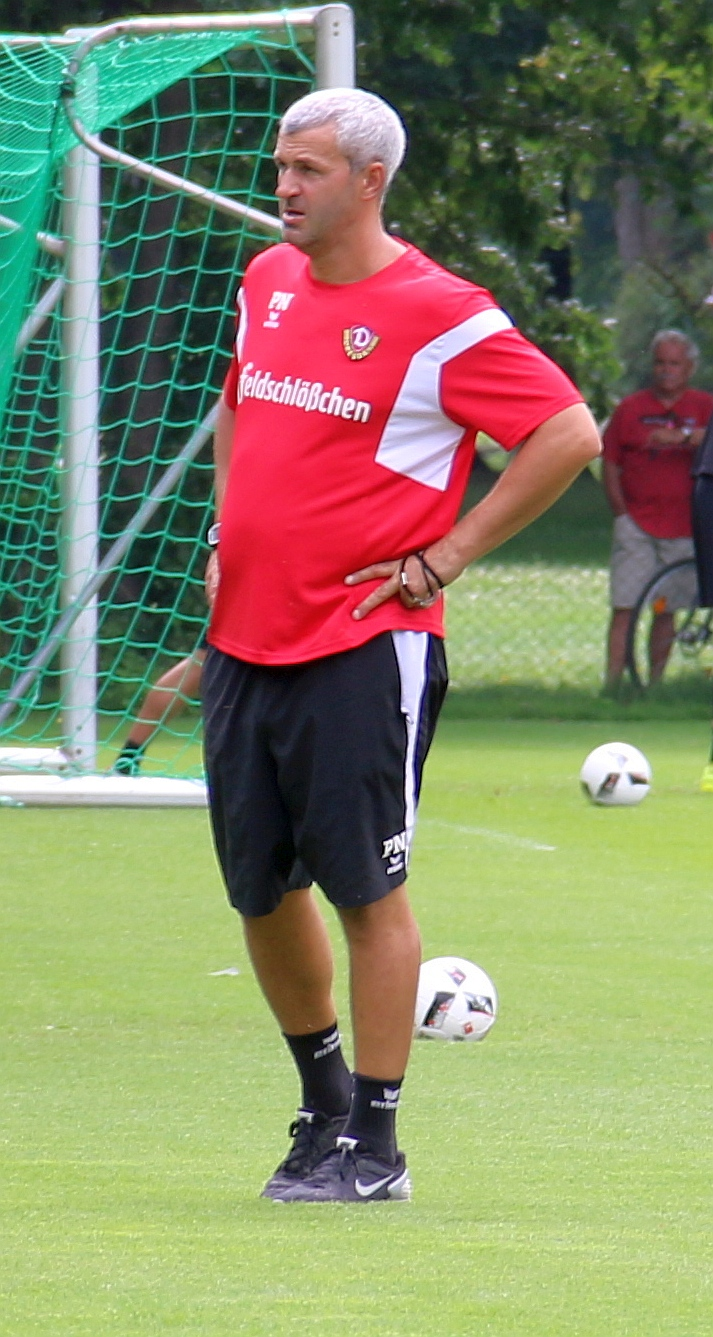

Personal information
- Date of birth: 14 September 1972 (age 54)
- Place of birth: Bojnice, Czechoslovakia
- Height: 1.84 m (6 ft 0 in)
- Position: Midfielder

Youth career
- 1981–1992: Baník Prievidza

Senior career*
Years	Team	Apps	(Gls)
1993–1996	Baník Prievidza	43	(4)
1996–1997	MŠK Žilina	20	(2)
1997–2000	Inter Bratislava	84	(14)
2000–2001	Baník Ostrava	26	(4)
2001–2002	Eintracht Frankfurt	13	(0)
2002–2003	Laugaricio Trenčín	17	(2)
2003–2008	Sportfreunde Siegen	137	(3)
2009	SpVg. Bürbach		

International career
1999–2001	Slovakia	22	(3)

Managerial career
- 2008–2009: Sportfreunde Siegen
- 2013–2014: Dynamo Dresden (assistant)
- 2015: Dynamo Dresden
- 2015–2018: Dynamo Dresden (assistant)
- 2018–2021: Arminia Bielefeld (assistant)
- 2022–: FC St. Pauli (assistant)
- * Club domestic league appearances and goals

Peter Németh (born 14 September 1972) is a retired Slovak football player and manager he is the currently assistant coach of Bundesliga club FC St. Pauli.

Németh played for several top Slovak clubs during his career, including Inter Bratislava and MŠK Žilina. He also spent one season playing for Czech team Baník Ostrava. Since 2001 he played mostly in Germany. Németh was also a regular for the Slovakia national football team.
