= Igor Demo =

Slovak former professional footballer

Personal information
- Full name: Igor Demo
- Date of birth: 18 September 1975 (age 51)
- Place of birth: Nitra, Czechoslovakia
- Height: 1.85 m (6 ft 1 in)
- Position: Midfielder

Senior career*
Years	Team	Apps	(Gls)
1990–1994	FC Nitra	41	(4)
1994–1997	Slovan Bratislava	77	(12)
1997–2000	PSV Eindhoven	27	(0)
2000–2005	Borussia Mönchengladbach	142	(28)
2005–2006	Grazer AK	14	(0)
2006	FC Nitra	12	(1)
Total		312	(45)

International career
1997–2005	Slovakia	24	(4)

Managerial career
- 2013: FC Nitra
- * Club domestic league appearances and goals

Igor Demo (born 18 September 1975) is a Slovak former professional footballer. His playing position was midfielder.

Demo was born and grew up in Nitra, and he started his professional career playing for the local team FC Nitra. He also played for ŠK Slovan Bratislava before being transferred to the Dutch side PSV Eindhoven in 1997. He moved to Germany to join Borussia Mönchengladbach in 1999, and played there for six seasons. In 2005, Demo was signed by the Austrian team Grazer AK, but could not secure a spot on the match-day squad due to injuries, and his contract was terminated with mutual agreement on 5 January 2010. He then returned to his first club, FC Nitra.

Demo has represented his country in 24 international matches, in which he has scored four goals.

== Honours ==
PSV

- Johan Cruyff Shield: 1997
