= Galicia TV =

International television channel of Televisión de Galicia

- Country: Spain
- Broadcast area: Americas; Europe
- Headquarters: Santiago de Compostela

Programming
- Language: Galician
- Picture format: 720p HDTV

Ownership
- Owner: CRTVG
- Sister channels: Televisión de Galicia tvG2

History
- Launched: 1 April 1997 (Americas); 15 September 1997 (Europe)

Links
- Website: agalega.gal

Galicia TV is an international television channel owned and operated by Televisión de Galicia S.A., the television subsidiary of Corporación Radio e Televisión de Galicia (CRTVG). It delivers two separate programming feeds (Galicia TV Europa and Galicia TV América) through subscription television operators and the internet.

The channel is distributed in several European countries by Canal+ subsidiary Thema, in Spain by Vodafone España through its subsidiary Overon, and in Portugal by NOS.

== History ==
TVG was one of the three strategic partners in the Galeusca satellite project for the Americas, alongside Euskal Telebista and Televisió de Catalunya. On 1 April 1997, it began broadcasting a satellite channel of its own, Galicia TV, for the Americas, leaving the Galeusca channel up to ETB and TVC. The project cost 120 million pesetas

TVG had plans to begin the satellite channel for Europe as far back as 1996, when it held negotiations alongside ETB and TVC to start a regular service. The European plan implied a full service after the launch of Galeusca for America. The European feed of the channel started broadcasting on 15 September 1997, coinciding with the launch of Vía Digital.

In September 2013, Cablevisión Argentina moved Galicia TV América exclusively to its digital service, part of a higher-end package, which most of the audience could not afford.

As of March 2015, "more than one million people" watched Galicia TV, 235,000 of them within other autonomous communities of Spain. The satellite footprint for Europe and North Africa covered 42 million households (of which 1,7 million were in Portugal, on cable companies); while in Argentina, it was distributed to 3 million households, 200,000 in Uruguay and 100,000 in Mexico.

On 14 August 2025, Galicia TV Europa ceased satellite distribution on Astra. The Galician diaspora in Europe criticized the decision: one immigrant noted that the TVG app delivered the signal in standard definition, whereas the satellite signal was delivered in high definition. Galician associations in Europe, such as As Xeitosiñas de Zurich, demanded the return of the satellite feed.
