= TvG2 =

tvG2
- Country: Spain
- Broadcast area: Galicia, reaching bordering regions via overspill of the Galician terrestrial network
- Headquarters: Santiago de Compostela

Programming
- Language: Galician
- Picture format: 720p HDTV

Ownership
- Owner: Corporación de Servizos Audiovisuais de Galicia (CSAG)
- Sister channels: TVG; Galicia TV

History
- Launched: February 2, 2009
- Former names: G2 (February – September 2009)

Links
- Website: agalega.gal

Availability

Terrestrial
- Digital: Mux 61 (A Coruña); Mux 40 (Santiago); Mux 59 (Lugo); Mux 62 (Ourense); Mux 58 (Pontevedra)

tvG2 (tvG Dous, previously G2) is a Spanish free-to-air television channel owned and operated by Televisión de Galicia S.A., the television subsidiary of Galician regional-owned public broadcaster Corporación de Servizos Audiovisuais de Galicia (CSAG). It is the corporation's second television channel. It is related to sister channels Televisión de Galicia and the two feeds of Galicia TV.

== History ==
The channel was officially launched as G2 on February 2, 2009. Previously, TVG América's programming was broadcast on that signal, complemented by sports on weekends. On September 14, 2009, the channel completed its programming creation process, it was also renamed TvG2 for which reason it began to broadcast some spaces that were previously part of the programming of the main channel.

== Programming ==
TvG2 is known for broadcasting documentaries, sports and programming for children and teenagers in Galician language. From Monday to Friday, the programming focuses on children's, youth and cultural programs. While on weekends sporting events are broadcast, especially the Segunda RFEF and Tercera RFEF football leagues.
