= Carmen Babiano Méndez-Núñez =

Spanish artist (1852–1914)

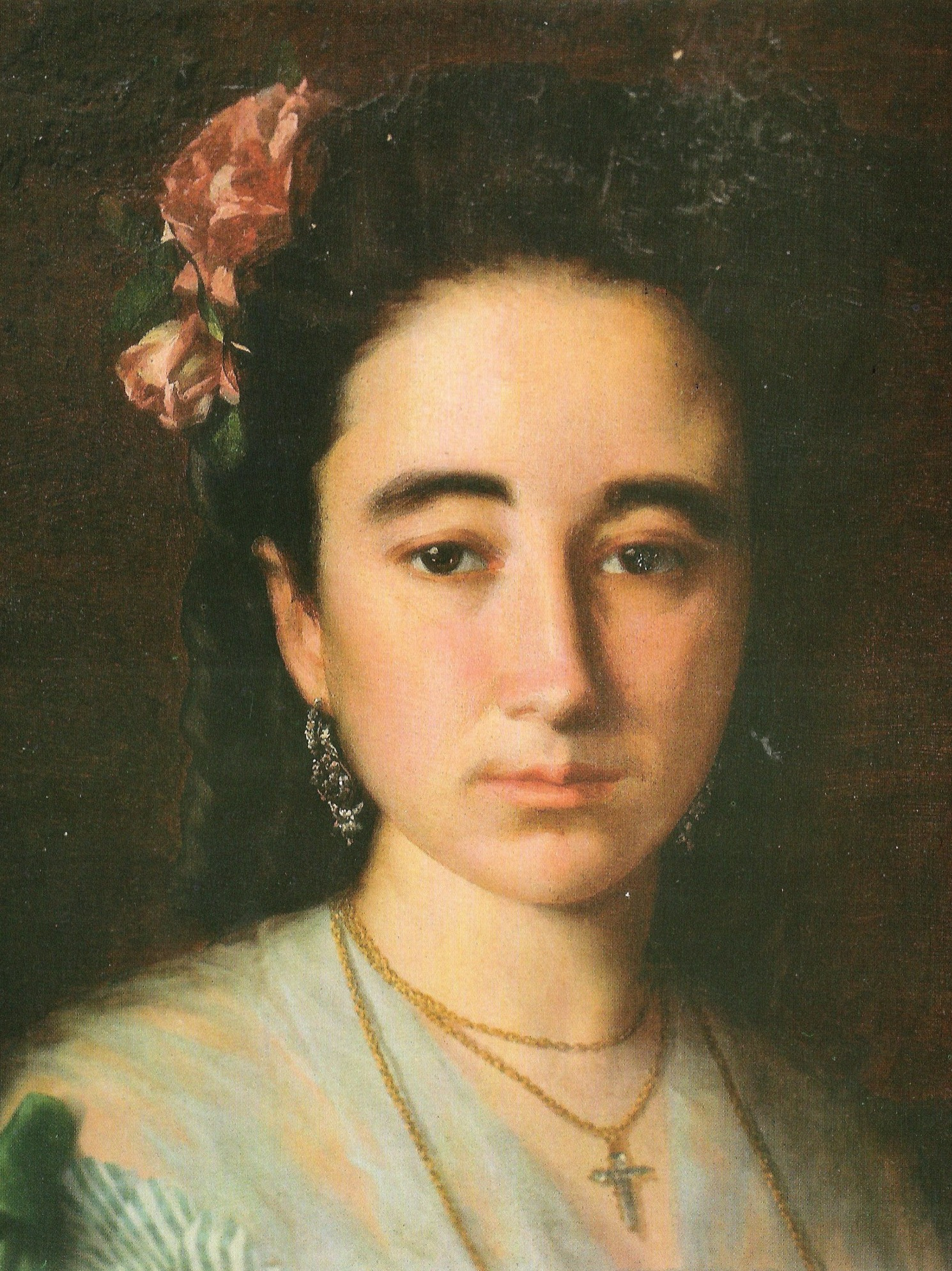
Carmen Babiano

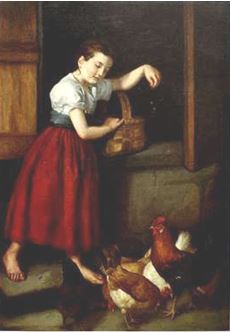
Pitas

Carmen Babiano Méndez-Núñez (1852–1914) was a Spanish painter and a pioneer in feminine art.

She was born in Santiago de Compostela, the daughter of José Babiano Rodríguez, an army colonel, and of María del Carmen Clara Méndez Núñez, the sister of Admiral Casto Méndez Núñez.

At the Santiago Exhibition, 1875, she exhibited two oil paintings and two landscapes in crayon; at Corufia, 1878, a portrait in oil of her uncle, the Marquis de Méndez Núñez; at Pontevedra, 1880, several pen and water-color studies, three life-size portraits in crayon, and a work in oil, "A Girl Feeding Chickens." She died in Pontevedra.
