= Santiago de Compostela campaign =

- Almansur in front of the tomb of the apostle James, 1872 depiction.
Date	997
Location	Iberian Peninsula
Result	Cordoban victory

Belligerents
Kingdom of León: County of Portugal	Caliphate of Cordoba

Commanders and leaders
Bermudo II of León: Gonçalo Mendes of Portugal	Almanzor

Strength
Unknown	Unknown

Casualties and losses
Unknown; 4,000 captured	Unknown

The Santiago de Compostela campaign, also known as the 48th campaign of Almanzor, was a military expedition led by Almanzor, prime-minister of Caliph Hisham II of Córdoba, which targeted Galicia, specifically Santiago de Compostela.

It was Almanzor's most famous campaign and, on the way, the Cordoban army passed through the county of Portugal, which was devastated.

== Context ==
On 1 October 976, Hisham II succeeded Caliph Al-Hakam II on the throne of Cordoba. The following week, the new Caliph appointed Ibn Abi Amir, later known as Almanzor, to the position of hajib or prime minister. Almanzor took on dictatorial powers and continued the military reforms previously begun by Al-Hakam II. Threatened by Christian incursions, the following year he instituted a policy of destructive campaigns against the kingdoms of the north, usually twice a year, to collect tribute or plunder them if they refused to pay, a policy that would continue beyond his death, until 1008. These were 31 years of Cordoban hegemony imposed on the Christian kingdoms with brutality and the most chaotic since the beginning of the Reconquista.

In 987, Almanzor recaptured Coimbra, Seia, Viseu and Lamego, and in 990 the Cordobans recaptured Montemor-o-Velho, thus opening the way to the northwest.

== The campaign ==
The cavalry left Córdoba on 3 July accompanied by supply wagons, along the old Roman road that headed northwest, while the infantry, weapons, provisions and ammunition headed for the port city of Alcácer do Sal, where they would embark to the rendezvous point at the city of Porto, in Portuguese territory. At Coria, several counts from León joined Almanzor's army. From there, Almanzor reached Viseu, where he was joined by subjugated counts and Christian nobles exiled from their countries, such as Galindo the Galician or Froila Gonçalves, former count of Coimbra, who had preferred to side with Almanzor when he captured the city in 987.

Once the army and navy had gathered in the Douro River, the troops crossed it via a pontoon bridge that Almanzor had built, the first to connect its two banks. Porto was poorly fortified and offered little resistance. The campaign towards Galicia was preceded by an incursion by troops led by a brother of Froila Gonçalves, Veila Gonçalves, who lived in Terra de Santa Maria under Muslim rule and was charged with neutralising any forces that could jeopardise the advance of the Muslim army, namely those of Count Gonçalo Mendes of Portugal. Henrique Gonçalves, lord of Maia, whose castle was the main fortification in the region, colluded with Veila. Henrique Gonçalves also took advantage of the occasion to usurp the land of Dona Zalamiz and her son Didago. Braga was besieged with difficulty but it was ultimately sacked and destroyed. Brittonia, near Viana do Castelo, put up strong resistance but was sacked. At Valadares de Monção, they crossed the Minho river.

North of the Minho, the castle of San Pelaio was razed to the ground. Iria Flavia was sacked and destroyed. Throughout western Galicia, numerous towns and monasteries were destroyed.

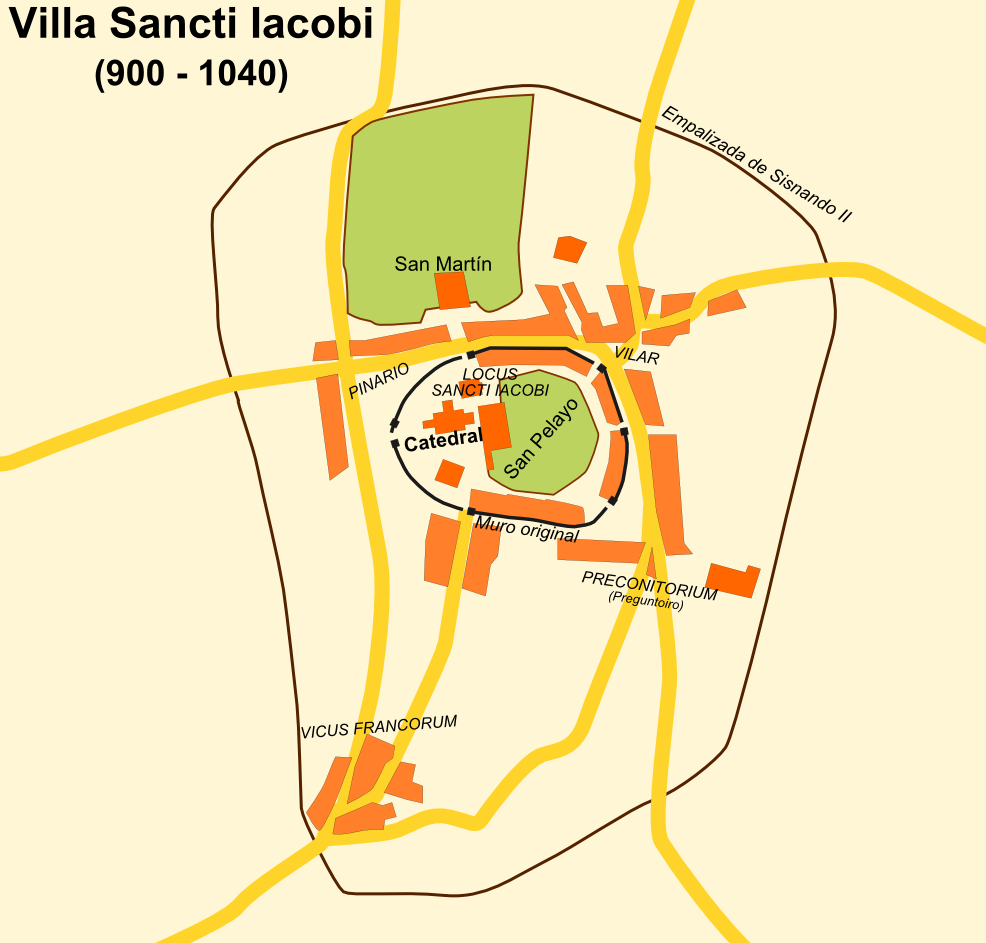
Map of Santiago de Compostela between 900-1040.

When the first messengers reported the approach of the Cordovan army, the Bishop of Compostela, Pedro de Mezonzo, ordered the evacuation of the city and withdrew to a monastery in the interior, possibly in Sobrado, along with the saint's relics on this occasion, it is assumed. Almanzor's army pitched camp outside Compostela on 10 August. The city was sacked and razed to the ground, but Almanzor decided to spare the tomb of St James the Apostle, and the guards he posted prevented it from being damaged. Almanzor remained in Santiago de Compostela for eight days. During his stay, he demolished the cathedral, the monastery of San Martín Pinario, the hospital founded by Sesnando II, the monastery of Antealtares and all the temples and palaces in the city.

On their way back from Santiago, the spoils were divided at Lamego among the leaders who had taken part in the campaign, both Christian and Muslim. Almanzor installed a Muslim garrison in Zamora, but the bulk of his troops remained in Toro. Almanzor then imposed peace terms on the Christian lords that allowed him to renounce campaigns in the north in 998, the first year this had happened since 977. Almansor's army was struck by dysentery during its march to Cordoba. Among the spoils captured in Santiago de Compostela were the bells and doors of the cathedral, carried by 4,000 captives taken during the campaign. The bells were turned into chandeliers for the great mosque of Córdoba.

Two years after Almanzor's attack, Bishop Pedro de Mezonzo restored the temple of Santiago. Almanzors attack in 997 had profound repercussions. Santiago de Compostela became an important international pilgrimage destination over the following century and a symbol of Christianity in the Iberian Peninsula. Santiago, in turn, was gradually adopted as the patron saint of the Reconquista with the epithet the Moor-Slayer.

== See also ==
- Portugal in the Reconquista
