= Old Town of Santiago de Compostela =

Santiago de Compostela (Old Town)
UNESCO World Heritage Site
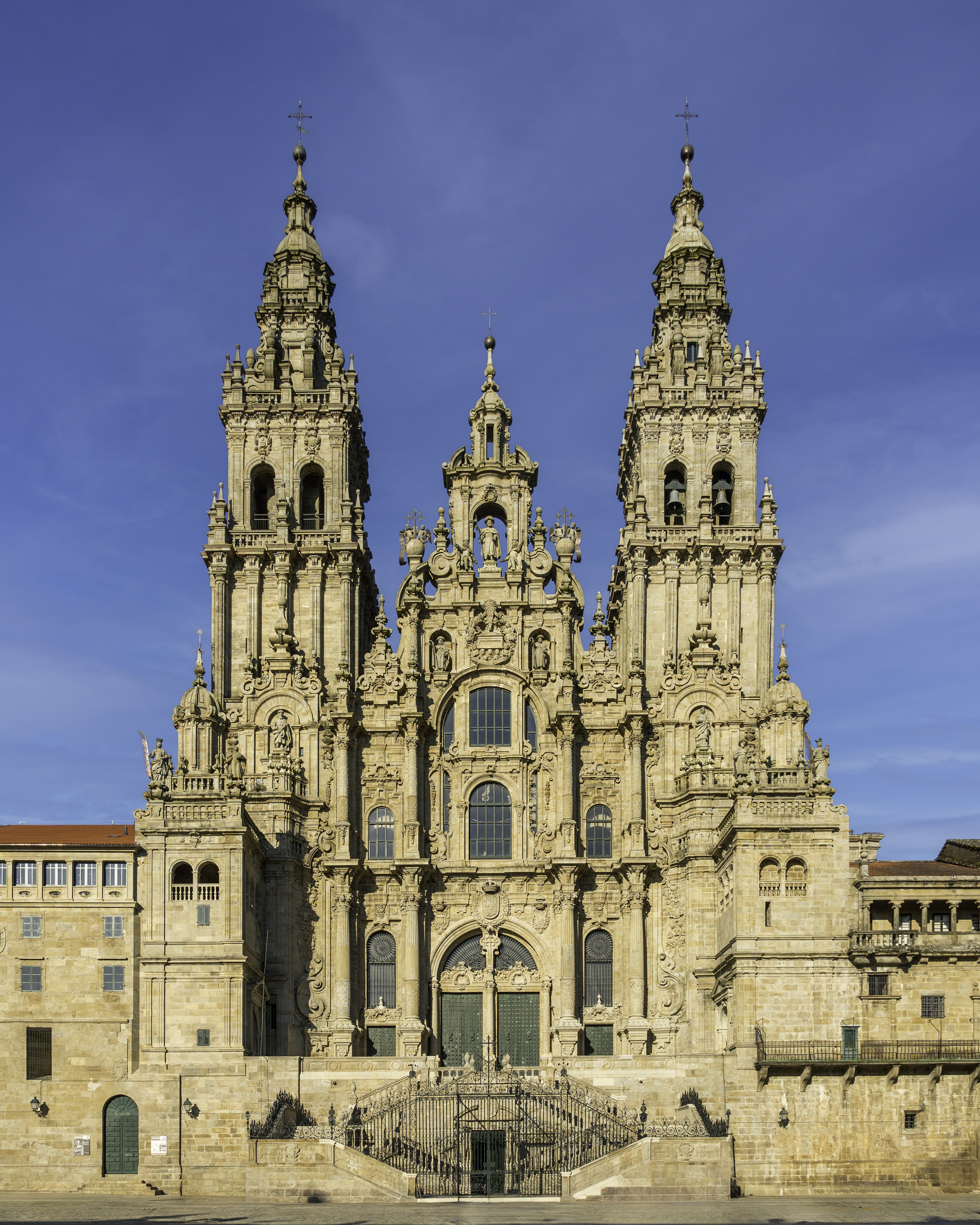
- The Obradoiro façade of the grand Cathedral of Santiago de Compostela
- Interactive map of Santiago de Compostela (Old Town)
- Criteria: Cultural: i, ii, vi
- Reference: 347
- Inscription: 1985 (9th Session)
- Area: 107.59 ha (265.9 acres)
- Buffer zone: 216.88 ha (535.9 acres)

The Old Town of Santiago de Compostela is an urban area of the Galician capital that is characterized by its ancient and monumental architecture.

== Description ==
It was chosen as a World Heritage Site by Unesco in 1985, fulfilling 3 of the sufficient selection criteria:

- I. Represent a masterpiece of human creative genius.
- II. Witness a significant exchange of human values over a period of time or within a cultural area of the world, in the development of architecture or technology, monumental arts, urban planning or landscape design.
- VI. Be directly or tangibly associated with living events or traditions, with ideas or beliefs, with artistic and literary works of exceptional universal importance. (The committee considers that this criterion should preferably be accompanied by other criteria.)

The historic centre of the city grew around the cathedral after the mythical discovery of the tomb of apostle James in 813, attracting the pilgrimage of millions of people for centuries, in one of the most remarkable phenomena of medieval history. The buildings that were built in the ancient city during the Romanesque, Gothic and Baroque periods made it one of the most beautiful urban areas in the world, becoming a place of worship with great artistic splendor.
