= Alfonso Sánchez Izquierdo =

Alfonso Sánchez Izquierdo (born 1949 in Sidi Ifni) is a Spanish journalist and broadcast executive. In May 2009, he was appointed director general of Compañía de Radio Televisión de Galicia, the public broadcaster for the autonomous community of Galicia, Spain.

He holds a Diploma in Information Sciences at the Escuela de Periodismo de Madrid (Madrid School of Journalism) (1973) and Bachelor of Laws (1978) from Complutense University, as well as a degree in sociology from the Instituto León XIII,

He began his journalism career as a correspondent for EFE in the U.S. In 1973 he joined the newspaper La Región as its editor.

He became editor of the newspaper, to which he remained linked professionally for 35 years. He held other positions within the La Región group, including CEO of the newspaper Diario de Vigo (1987), of the Axencia Galega de Noticias news agency (1990) and president and CEO of Telemiño.

In 2005 he was awarded the Diego Bernal prize, named in memory of another prominent journalist now deceased, by the Asociación de Periodistas de Galicia (Association of Journalists of Galicia).

In July 2008, Sánchez Izquierdo left La Región and was replaced by Xosé Manuel Pastoriza.

From July 2008 until May 2009 he carried out research work and taught as an associate professor at the University of Santiago de Compostela.

Since 2008 he also taught at the University of Vigo and served on the board of directors of Acioavia Wises, S.L.

Alfonso Sánchez Izquierdo is the co-author of the books Diálogo Social en Galicia (Social Dialogue in Galicia) (2008) and Veinticinco años de autonomía de Galicia (Twenty-five years of autonomy of Galicia) (2005). He also chaired the committee for the media language standardization plan of Galicia.

In 2008 he was named president of the Asociación Galega de Xestión da Comunicación. In November 2009 he was named chairperson of FORTA, the Federation of Regional Organizations of Radio and Television (Spanish: Federación de Organismos de Radio y Televisión Autonómicos).
