= Association for Equal and Fair Trade Pangaea =

- Founded: 1995
- Defunct: 2016
- Type: Nonprofit non-governmental organization
- Location: Santiago de Compostela, Spain
- Region served: Galicia (Spain)
- Website: panxea.org/panxeablog/

The Association for Equal and Fair Trade Pangaea (Spanish: Asociación para el Comercio Justo y Solidario Pangea) was a Spanish secular human development non-governmental organization best known for its work on fair trade and food sovereignty. It operated from 1995 until it was closed in 2016.

It was governed in a participative and democratic way by its members who, organized in commissions, voted and discussed its decisions. Apart from the general annual assembly, it had open and public weekly meetings in the head office. Together with the activities of social education, social action and human development it also had a public open fair trade shop.

== History ==
It was founded in 1995 by a group of former volunteers looking for a new way to spread their views on fair trade, responsible consumption and social action in Santiago de Compostela and Galicia.

Pangaea was an important member of: Galician Net of Conscious and Responsible Consumption (Spanish: Red de Consumo Consciente y Responsable), Initiative for Food Sovereignty (Spanish: Iniciativa por la Soberanía Alimentaria) and Space for a Fair Trade (Spanish: Espacio por un Comercio Justo).

Pangaea won the 2006 Vagalume Prize in social work awarded by the municipality of Santiago de Compostela besides other minor awards and prizes.

In 2010, Pangaea established itself as Consumer's Cooperative for Fair Trade and organic products, under the name of Panxea S.C.G.

It ceased operating in 2016 when it website was closed down.

== Operations ==
The most important work of the association was in Fair Trade and organic products. It achieved this is through its public open fair trade shop. Goods were obtained through Fair Trade importers, which guaranteed the source and Fair Trade credentials of the products.

Organic products were directly purchased from local farmers and producers, trying to fulfill local sourcing criteria with full respect of environmental standards. The rest of the social education, works and lectures were given through the participation in forums, social acts and congresses.

== See also ==
- Fair Trade
- Food sovereignty
