= Ana Romero Masiá =

Spanish historian and archaeologist

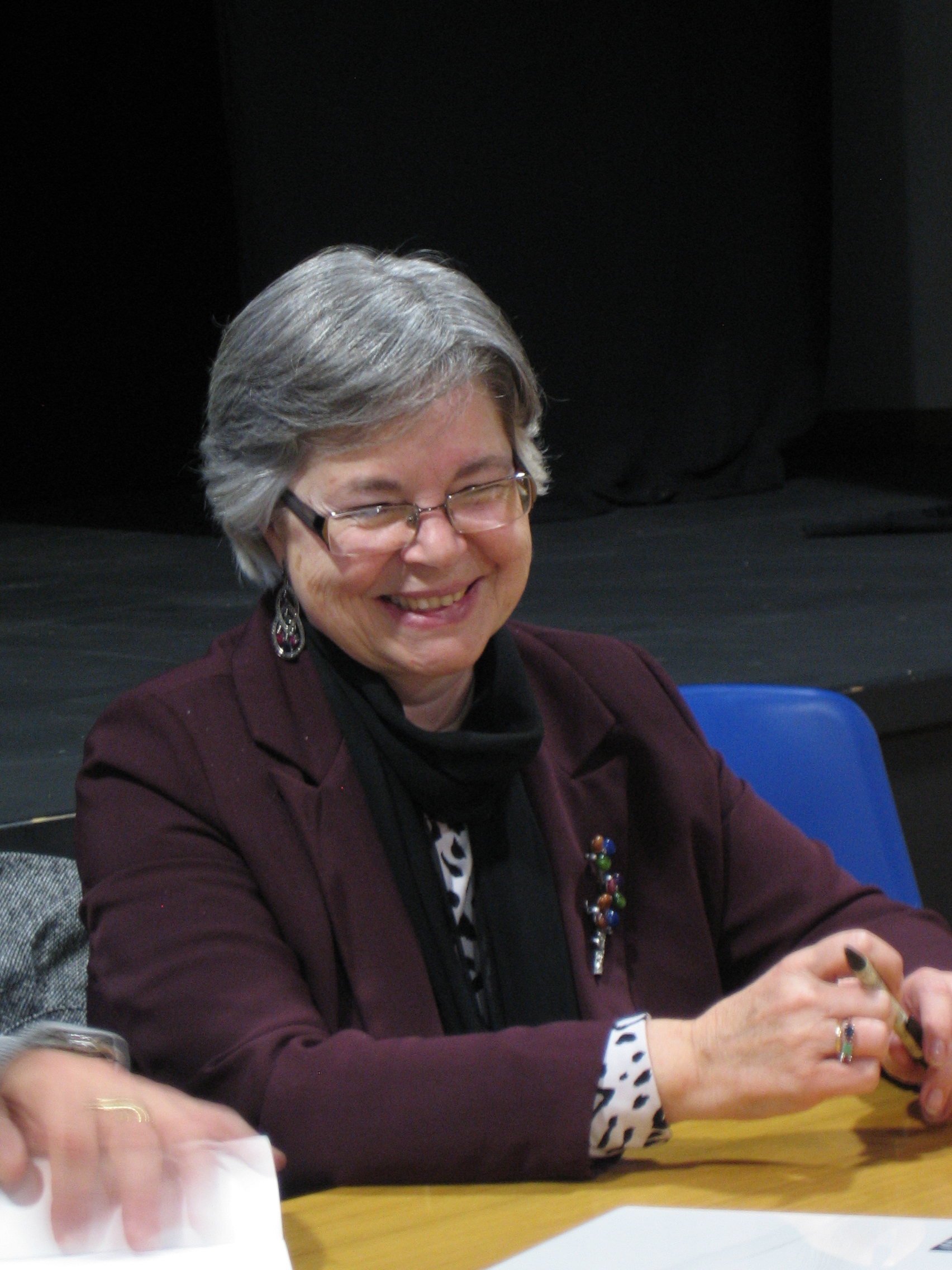
- Ana Romero Masiá presenting one of her books in Culleredo (in 2012).
- Born: 4 January 1952 (age 74); Santiago de Compostela Galicia
- Occupations: Historian, Professor, Archaeologist
- Spouse: José Manuel Pose Mesura (1950-2012)
- Children: Ana Pose Romero

Ana Romero Masiá (Santiago de Compostela, 4 January 1952) is a Galician historian, archaeologist, and academic.

== Biography ==
Ana Romero Masiá graduated from the University of Santiago de Compostela, she holds a BA in Ancient History and Art History. Later she earned her doctorate in history at the University of A Coruña.

During 1980s she was archaeologist of the excavations of the Castro de Borneiro.

She currently directs the Institute of Monte B. Moas (secondary schools) in A Coruña, where she also teaches Geography and History.

== Works ==
- 1987: Castro de Borneiro.
- 1991: Fontes para o estudio da Torre de Hércules.
- 1992: Obxectos metálicos no castro de Borneiro.
- 1996: Antecedentes históricos no tráfico marítimo dos portos galegos con Europa.
- 1997: Apoio de Ferrol á Coruña no 1889.
- 1997: A fábrica de tobaccos da Palloza. Producción e vida laboral na decana das fábricas coruñesas.
- 1980: Cultura de los castros.
- 1985: Os castros: recoñecemento e catalogación.
- 1997: O hábitat castrexo na ría de Ferrol.
- A Coruña dos Austrias
- A Coruña medieval
- Historia contemporánea e cine. Modelos de aproveitamento didáctico
- Historia de España. Selección documental
- Libro de Sociais de 1.º, 2.º, 3.º e 4.º da ESO [Escuela Secundaria Obligatoria]

== Awards ==
- 2011: Ana Romero Masiá received Luis Tilve Research Disclosure Historical award for her book Xaime Quintanilla Martínez. Vida e obra dun socialista e galeguista ao servizo da República, with Carlos Pereira.

== Personal life ==
Ana Romero Masiá is married to José Manuel Pose Mesura (1950-2012), professor de historia y subdelegado del Gobierno. Her daughter Ana Pose Romero is amusic teacher at CRA Os Remuíños, A Laracha.
