= As Orfas =

Baroque buildings in Santiago de Compostela, Spain

Coordinates: 42°52′41″N 8°32′36″W

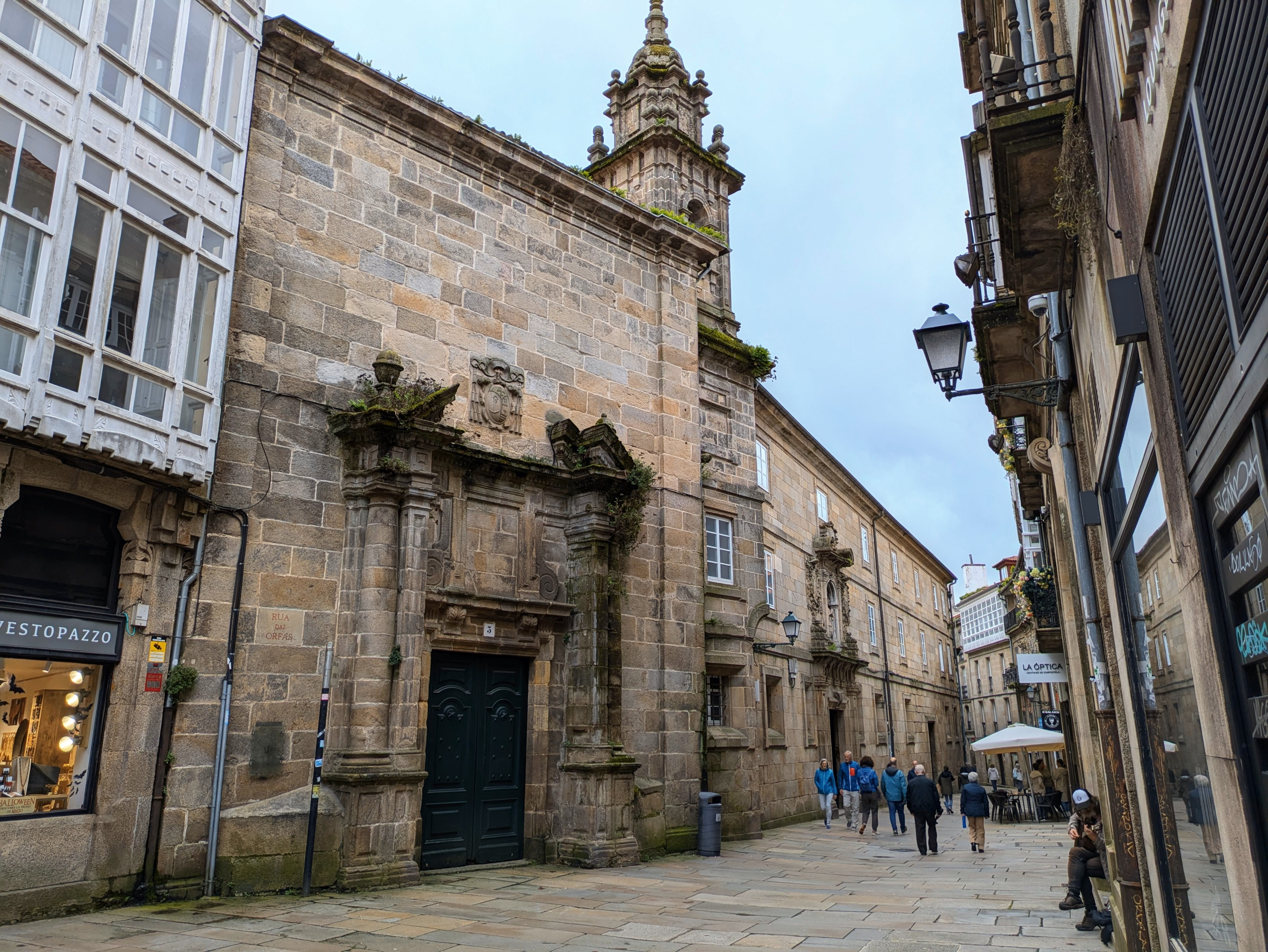
Exterior of the building

As Orfas ("The Orphans") refers to a group of baroque buildings in Santiago de Compostela, Province of A Coruña, Galicia, Spain. Located on a street of the same name in the eastern part of the old town, the complex comprises a convent, a church, and a school, built in the early 17th century to house and educate orphaned girls.

The convent is currently home to a Catholic School, named 'Nosa Señora dos Remedios', although it is still commonly known as ‘As Orfas’. The church is open daily, and Masses are held there every day.
