= Superoito =

Superoito is a Galician band of punk-rock music formed in the 2013 in Santiago de Compostela. It is formed by Iván R. Paderne (singer and guitarist), Diego Falque (bassist, singer and choruses), Diego Fernández (guitarist) and Glenn Carbajal (battery).

== History ==
His first album, Non sabes bailar, recorded in the studios Rapapoulo, presented the 14 of June 2013 in a concert deprived in the Pontecarreira. In the second half of the year carried out turns it of presentation of the album, with more of one hundred concerts.

At 15 December 2013 organized the I Festival Solidario de Nadal, in collaboration with the Hospital of Santiago de Compostela, with the objective to collect toys and money stop the families forced to spend the dates of Christmas inside the hospitable complexes.

In January 2014 published the second album, Todo me dá voltas, composed by 13 songs and recorded in the studios Rapapoulo of Merelle by Mou of Dios ke te crew.

Linked very strongly with the defence of the Galician language, his songs treat on subjects of the daily life treaties with true apego funny how Galicia, the dignificación of the labor sailor, the sexual and ideological freedom, the fight against the building of the mine of Corcoesto or the turn of the Galicia national football team.

== Discography ==
- Non Sabes Bailer (2013, single, Rapapoulo Estudios)
- Todo Me Dá Voltas (2014, LP, Rapapoulo Estudios)
- Portandos Mal (2016, single, Estudio Máxico)
- En Directo (2016, EP, Estudio Máxico)
- A Mala Vida (2022, LP, Cimática Studio)
