= Televisión de Galicia =

Television channel

- Country: Spain
- Broadcast area: Galicia, reaching bordering regions via overspill of the Galician terrestrial network
- Headquarters: Santiago de Compostela

Programming
- Language: Galician
- Picture format: 720p HDTV

Ownership
- Owner: Corporación de Servizos Audiovisuais de Galicia (CSAG)
- Sister channels: tvG2; Galicia TV

History
- Launched: 24 July 1985

Links
- Website: agalega.gal

Availability Europe and America

Terrestrial
- Digital terrestrial television: A Coruña (North): 25; A Coruña (South): 40; Lugo: 59; Ourense: 50; Pontevedra: 58; El Bierzo (León): 53

Televisión de Galicia (Galician pronunciation: [teleβiˈsjon dɪ ɣaˈliθjɐ]; "Television of Galicia"; abbreviated as TVG), commonly known as A Galega ("The Galician [One]"), is a Spanish free-to-air television channel owned and operated by Televisión de Galicia S.A., the television subsidiary of Galician regional-owned public broadcaster Corporación de Servizos Audiovisuais de Galicia (CSAG). It is the corporation's flagship television channel, and is known for broadcasting mainstream and generalist programming, including Telexornal news bulletins, primetime drama and entertainment in the Galician language.

It was launched on 25 July 1985 as the first Galician language television service. Its broadcast covers the whole Galician territory and it is financed by its autonomous government.

== History ==
TVG went on air for the first time on 25 July 1985, with the short film Mamasunción by Chano Piñeiro. After a test period, which lasted until 29 September 1985, the station began broadcasting regularly with 39 weekly hours of programmes. The station now broadcasts 24 hours a day, with almost 70 per cent of its programming produced by TVG itself. On 31 December 1996, its international channel started broadcasting in America through satellite, and on 17 May 1997, started offering its complete service via the Internet. Soon afterwards, the international channel started broadcasting in Europe. In 2019, TVG started HD broadcasting in free-to-air TV in Galicia, and in 2020 the European international channel ceased its SD broadcast through satellite. TVG is also offered in other parts of Spain as well as in Portugal by a number of cable television providers. All broadcasts are open and "free to air" (restrictions may sometimes apply to sporting events).

== Location and language ==
TVG's headquarters are located at San Marcos Studios on the outskirts of Santiago de Compostela. All TVG programming is in Galician, except for commercials, which are sometimes in Spanish.

As a public channel, TVG is subject to Galician law. Its mission is to promote the Galician language and culture, while providing entertainment and quality productions. TVG's directive board is formed by television specialists appointed by the Galician Parliament (representing all the different political groups).

== Logos ==
First and original logo. From 1985 to 1994.

Second logo. From 1994 to 1997.

Third logo. From 1997 to 2006.

Current logo. Since 2006.

== See also ==
- Xabarín Club
