= Corporación de Servizos Audiovisuais de Galicia =

Public broadcasting authority in Galicia, Spain

Corporación de Servizos Audiovisuais de Galicia (CSAG)
- Type: Radio, television, online
- Country: Spain
- First air date: 1985
- Availability: Galicia, reaching bordering regions via overspill of the Galician terrestrial network
- Founded: 1984
- Owner: Ministry of Presidency, Civil Service and Justice
- Key people: Alfonso Sánchez Izquierdo (Director Xeral)
- Former names: Corporación Radio e Televisión de Galicia (CRTVG)
- Affiliation: FORTA
- Official website: www.crtvg.gal

The Corporación de Servizos Audiovisuais de Galicia (CSAG), known as Corporación Radio e Televisión de Galicia (CRTVG) until 2024, is the public broadcaster for the autonomous community of Galicia, Spain. All of its emissions are fully in Galician language.

== Organisation ==
CRTVG was created on 11 July 1984 with the Lei de Galicia 9/1984. With this law two separate companies were created; Televisión de Galicia, S.A. which is responsible for producing televisual output and Radio Galega, S.A. which produces its radio content.

- Televisión de Galicia, S.A.
  - TVG
  - tvG2
  - TVG Europa
  - TVG América
- Radio Galega, S.A.
  - Radio Galega
  - Radio Galega Música
  - Son Galicia Radio

== Governance ==
The network is governed by a tripartisan board of directors appointed by the Galician Parliament.

=== Board of directors ===
- María Bastida Domínguez (People's Party of Galicia, PPdeG)
- Xosé Luís Iravedra Lestal (PPdeG)
- Xoán Manuel Jiménez Morán (PPdeG)
- Arturo Maneiro Vila (PPdeG)
- Higinio Meijide Gómez (PPdeG)
- Ana Isabel Peón Pineiro (PPdeG)
- Juan Carlos Araújo Rodríguez (Socialists' Party of Galicia, PSdeG-PSOE)
- Roberto Cid González (PSdeG-PSOE)
- Adriana Fernández Vázquez (PSdeG-PSOE)
- Carlos Alberto Rodríguez Calvo (PSdeG-PSOE)
- Manuel Antelo Pazos (Galician Nationalist Bloc, BNG)
- Montserrat Prado Cores (BNG)

=== Director General ===
The director general is the head of CRTVG. He is directly appointed by the Xunta de Galicia. The current director general of CRTVG is Alfonso Sánchez Izquierdo.

- 1985–86 Luis Losada
- 1986–87 Lois Caeiro
- 1987–90 Abilio Bernardo de Quirós
- 1990–94 Ramón Villot
- 1994-05 Francisco Campos
- 2005–09 Benigno Sánchez
- 2009– Alfonso Sánchez Izquierdo

== Corporate identity ==
Logo until 2024

Logo since 2024

== See also ==
- FORTA
