= 2013–14 FK Senica season =

Slovak football club season

Senica
2013–14 season
- Owner: Vladimír Levársky
- President: Viktor Blažek
- Manager: Vladimír Koník (until 27 May 2013); Eduard Pagáč (from 3 June 2013 to 12 March 2014); Pavel Hapal (from 12 March 2014)
- Stadium: Štadión FK Senica
- Slovak First Football League: 6th
- Slovak Cup: Semi-finals
- UEFA Europa League: Second qualifying round
- Top goalscorer: League: Juraj Piroska (13); All: Juraj Piroska (14)
- Highest home attendance: 4,500 v Spartak Trnava (13 July 2013, Slovak First Football League)
- Lowest home attendance: 822 v ViOn Zlaté Moravce (23 October 2013, Slovak Cup)
- Average home league attendance: 2,137
- Biggest win: 4–0 v DAC Dunajská Streda (Home, 28 July 2013, Slovak First Football League)
- Biggest defeat: 0–3 v Slovan Bratislava (Away, 15 April 2014, Slovak Cup); 1–4 v Žilina (Home, 10 May 2014, Slovak First Football League)

The 2013–14 season was Futbalový klub Senica's 5th consecutive season in the Slovak First Football League. In addition to the domestic league, Senica participated in that season's editions of the Slovak Cup and the UEFA Europa League.

== Squad ==
Note: Flags indicate national team as defined under FIFA eligibility rules; some limited exceptions apply. Players may hold more than one non-FIFA nationality.

No.	Pos.	Nation	Player
1	GK	SVK	Michal Šulla
2	FW	SVK	Juraj Chvátal
4	DF	CZE	Petr Pavlík
5	MF	SVK	Jakub Krč
6	MF	SVK	Tomáš Kóňa
7	MF	SVK	Tomáš Komara
9	FW	SVK	Milan Ferenčík
10	MF	BRA	Hiago (on loan from Arapongas)
11	FW	URU	Sebastián Sosa (on loan from Palermo)
12	DF	BRA	Cristovam (on loan from Arapongas)
14	FW	NGR	Christian Irobiso

No.	Pos.	Nation	Player
16	MF	CZE	Milan Jirásek (on loan from Sparta Prague)
18	GK	SVK	Pavel Kamesch
19	MF	CZE	Jan Kalabiška
21	DF	SVK	Róbert Mazáň
22	DF	BRA	Vitor Gava
23	MF	SVK	Lukáš Opiela
24	MF	SVK	Denis Ventúra
25	FW	SVK	Jakub Kosorin
33	FW	SVK	Juraj Piroska (captain)
—	GK	SVK	Martin Junas

== Transfers ==
=== Summer ===
In: Note: Flags indicate national team as defined under FIFA eligibility rules; some limited exceptions apply. Players may hold more than one non-FIFA nationality.

No.	Pos.	Nation	Player
30	GK	SVK	Ján Malec (loan return from FK DAC 1904 Dunajská Streda)
3	DF	CZE	Pavel Čermák (from (Czech Republic) FK Viktoria Žižkov)
9	FW	SVK	Alexander Jakubov (on loan from (Czech Republic) AC Sparta Prague)
10	FW	BRA	Hiago (on loan from (Brazil) Arapongas)
12	DF	BRA	Cristovam (on loan from (Brazil) Arapongas)
21	MF	CZE	Martin Zeman (on loan from (Czech Republic) AC Sparta Prague)
23	MF	SVK	Lukáš Opiela (from (Czech Republic) FK Mladá Boleslav)
5	DF	SVK	Michal Habánek (on loan from FC Spartak Trnava)
11	FW	CGO	Juvhel Tsoumou (from (Austria) TSV Hartberg)

Out: Note: Flags indicate national team as defined under FIFA eligibility rules; some limited exceptions apply. Players may hold more than one non-FIFA nationality.

No.	Pos.	Nation	Player
2	DF	SVK	Patrik Mráz (to (Poland) Górnik Łęczna)
3	DF	SVK	Ján Gajdošík (to ŽP Šport Podbrezová)
5	DF	SVK	Matej Krajčík (End of contract)
7	FW	PAN	Rolando Blackburn (loan return to (Panama) Chorrillo F.C.)
9	MF	SVK	Martin Ďurica (End of contract)
12	MF	NED	Stef Wijlaars (to (Czech Republic) SK Sigma Olomouc)
17	DF	SVK	Róbert Pillár (on loan to (Czech Republic) FC Hradec Králové)
20	FW	SVK	Pavol Masaryk (End of contract)
21	MF	SVK	Peter Štepanovský (on loan to FC Spartak Trnava)
23	MF	SVK	Martin Babic (loan return to FC ViOn Zlaté Moravce)
29	GK	CZE	Milan Švenger (loan return to (Czech Republic) AC Sparta Prague)

=== Winter ===
In: Note: Flags indicate national team as defined under FIFA eligibility rules; some limited exceptions apply. Players may hold more than one non-FIFA nationality.

No.	Pos.	Nation	Player
22	DF	BRA	Vitor Gava (from (Brazil) Arapongas)
21	DF	SVK	Róbert Mazáň (from FK AS Trenčín)
17	DF	SVK	Róbert Pillár (loan return from (Czech Republic) FC Hradec Králové)
—	DF	SVK	Miroslav Sedlák (loan return from FK DAC 1904 Dunajská Streda)
20	DF	UKR	Andriy Slinkin (on loan from (Ukraine) FC Chornomorets Odesa)
—	MF	SVK	Peter Štepanovský (loan return from FC Spartak Trnava)
9	FW	SVK	Milan Ferenčík (from Spartak Myjava)
—	FW	CZE	Petr Hošek (loan return from FK DAC 1904 Dunajská Streda)
14	FW	NGR	Christian Irobiso (from (Portugal) F.C. Paços de Ferreira)
11	FW	URU	Sebastián Sosa (on loan from (Italy) U.S. Città di Palermo)

Out: Note: Flags indicate national team as defined under FIFA eligibility rules; some limited exceptions apply. Players may hold more than one non-FIFA nationality.

No.	Pos.	Nation	Player
—	GK	SVK	Ján Malec (on loan to FK Pohronie)
—	DF	CZE	Erich Brabec (Released and he joined (Czech Republic) Bohemians 1905)
—	DF	CZE	Pavel Čermák (on loan to (Czech Republic) FC Hradec Králové)
—	DF	SVK	Michal Habánek (loan return to FC Spartak Trnava)
—	DF	SVK	Juraj Križko (to (Czech Republic) FC Hradec Králové)
—	DF	SVK	Róbert Pillár (on loan to FC Nitra)
—	DF	SVK	Miroslav Sedlák (on loan to OTJ Palárikovo)
—	DF	SVK	Peter Šenk (on loan to FK Pohronie)
—	MF	SVK	Peter Štepanovský (to (Armenia) FC Banants)
—	MF	CZE	Martin Zeman (loan return to (Czech Republic) AC Sparta Prague)
—	FW	CIV	Lamine Diarrassouba (to (Czech Republic) 1. SC Znojmo)
—	FW	CZE	Jaroslav Diviš (to (Czech Republic) 1. FC Slovácko)
—	FW	SVK	Alexander Jakubov (loan return to (Czech Republic) AC Sparta Prague)
—	FW	GER	Juvhel Tsoumou (Released)

== Competitions ==
=== Overview ===
Competition	First match	Last match	Starting round	Final position	Record							
Competition	First match	Last match	Starting round	Final position	Pld	W	D	L	GF	GA	GD	Win %
Slovak First Football League	13 July 2013	31 May 2014	Matchday 1	6th	33	13	7	13	45	47	−2	39.39
Slovak Cup	27 August 2013	15 April 2014	Second round	Semi-finals	6	2	2	2	6	7	−1	33.33
UEFA Europa League	18 July 2013	25 July 2013	Second qualifying round	Second qualifying round	2	0	1	1	2	3	−1	0.00
Total					41	15	10	16	53	57	−4	36.59

Source: Competitions

=== Slovak First Football League ===
==== League table ====
Pos	Team	Pld	W	D	L	GF	GA	GD	Pts	Qualification or relegation
4	Ružomberok	33	15	5	13	56	51	+5	50	
5	Košice	33	13	7	13	41	40	+1	46	Qualification for Europa League second qualifying round (Note: 2013–14 Slovak Cup winners Košice qualified for the second qualifying round of the 2014–15 UEFA Europa League.)
6	Senica	33	13	7	13	45	47	−2	46	
7	Myjava	33	13	6	14	45	54	−9	45	
8	Dukla Banská Bystrica	33	11	9	13	48	48	0	42	

Source: Niké liga (in Slovak)
Rules for classification: 1) points; 2) goal difference; 3) number of goals scored.

==== Results summary ====
Overall								Home						Away					
Pld	W	D	L	GF	GA	GD	Pts	W	D	L	GF	GA	GD	W	D	L	GF	GA	GD
33	13	7	13	45	47	−2	46	11	3	3	32	22	+10	2	4	10	13	25	−12

==== Results by round ====
Round	1	2	3	4	5	6	7	8	9	10	11	12	13	14	15	16	17	18	19	20	21	22	23	24	25	26	27	28	29	30	31	32	33
Ground	H	A	H	H	A	H	A	H	A	H	A	A	H	A	A	H	A	H	A	H	A	H	H	A	H	H	A	H	A	H	A	H	A
Result	W	L	W	W	D	W	D	W	D	D	L	L	L	W	L	W	L	W	W	W	L	W	L	L	D	W	L	W	D	L	L	D	L
Position	4	8	5	1	2	1	1	1	3	3	4	5	6	5	7	5	7	5	4	4	4	3	4	4	4	3	4	4	4	4	5	6	6
Points	3	3	6	9	10	13	14	17	18	19	19	19	19	22	22	25	25	28	31	34	34	37	37	37	38	41	41	44	45	45	45	46	46

A = Away; H = Home; W = Win; D = Draw; L = Loss

==== Matches ====
13 July 2013 1	Senica	2–1	Spartak Trnava	Senica
19:30 CEST (UTC+2)	Cristovam (yellow card) 18'; Šulla (yellow card) 43'; Piroska 45'; Kalabiška (yellow card) 56'; Diviš 65'	Report	E. Sabo (yellow card) 14'; Adámik (yellow card) 57'; Mikovič (yellow card) 68'; Klabník 87'	Stadium: Štadión FK Senica; Attendance: 4,500; Referee: Ivan Kružliak; Assistant referees: Tomáš Somoláni, Rastislav Žákech

28 July 2013 3	Senica	4–0	DAC Dunajská Streda	Senica
19:30 CEST (UTC+2)	Piroska 50' (pen.); Hiago 52'; Križko (yellow card) 53'; Diviš (yellow card) 69'; Jirásek 76'; Jakubov 86'	Report	Božoň (yellow card) 5'; Fodrek (yellow card) 48'; Beňo (yellow card) 49'; Majerník (yellow card) 50'; Obžera (yellow card) 83'	Stadium: Štadión FK Senica; Attendance: 1,911; Referee: Michal Smolák; Assistant referees: Peter Chládek, Dušan Hrčka

4 August 2013 4	Senica	3–1	Trenčín	Senica
19:30 CEST (UTC+2)	Jirásek 54'; Piroska 60'; Diviš 63', (yellow card) 76'	Report	Rundić (yellow card) 39'; Malec 84'	Stadium: Štadión FK Senica; Attendance: 2,561; Referee: Marek Mastiš; Assistant referees: Roman Slyško, Karol Poláček

10 August 2013 5	Spartak Myjava	2–2	Senica	Myjava
20:00 CEST (UTC+2)	Pekár 37'; Bruško (red card) 45'; Pellegrini (yellow card) 45'; Kosík (yellow card) 52'; Urgela 62'; Sládek (yellow card) 71'	Report	Kalabiška (yellow card) 35'; Diviš (yellow card) 39'; Pavlík 42'; Piroska (yellow card) 45', (goal) 47'	Stadium: Stadium Myjava; Attendance: 2,700; Referee: Kamil Horváth; Assistant referees: Milan Cuninka, Martin Borsányi

17 August 2013 6	Senica	1–0	Košice	Senica
19:30 CEST (UTC+2)	Kalabiška 44', (yellow card) 90'	Report	Viazanko (yellow card) 58'; Hovančík (yellow card) 76'	Stadium: Štadión FK Senica; Attendance: 2,349; Referee: Peter Kráľovič; Assistant referees: Tomáš Vorel, Peter Bednár

21 August 2013 2	Slovan Bratislava	1–0	Senica	Bratislava
19:00 CEST (UTC+2)	Bagayoko (yellow card) 10'; Halenár (yellow card) 33'; Fořt 45'	Report	Jirásek (yellow card) 24'; Habánek (yellow card) 76'; Zeman (yellow card) 90'	Stadium: Pasienky; Attendance: 0 Referee: Dušan Sedlák; Assistant referees: Peter Jenčura, Radoslav Bobko

24 August 2013 7	Ružomberok	1–1	Senica	Ružomberok
17:30 CEST (UTC+2)	Nagy (yellow card) 54'; Janec (yellow card) 64'; Zreľák 79'; Lačný (yellow card) 87'	Report	Piroska (yellow card) 20', (goal) 35'; Diviš (yellow card) 22'; Šulla (yellow card) 56'; Zeman (yellow card) 90'	Stadium: Štadión MFK Ružomberok; Attendance: 3,082; Referee: Richard Trutz; Assistant referees: Peter Chládek, Martin Špivák

30 August 2013 8	Senica	2–1	Žilina	Senica
18:00 CEST (UTC+2)	Piroska 5'; Jirásek 65'	Report	Škvarka 31'; Pich (yellow card) 34'; Piaček (red card) 68'; Guba (yellow card) 71'	Stadium: Štadión FK Senica; Attendance: 2,636; Referee: Vladimír Hracho; Assistant referees: Miroslav Benko, Gabriel Ádám

14 September 2013 9	ViOn Zlaté Moravce	2–2	Senica	Zlaté Moravce
17:30 CEST (UTC+2)	L. Szabó 57'; Orávik (yellow card) 78'; Bernáth 80'	Report	Piroska 32' (pen.); Diviš 75'	Stadium: Štadión FC ViOn; Attendance: 1,082; Referee: Štefan Leško; Assistant referees: Radomír Sluk, Peter Chládek

17 September 2013 10	Senica	1–1	Dukla Banská Bystrica	Senica
18:30 CEST (UTC+2)	Zeman 15'; Habánek (yellow card) 32'; Pavlík (yellow card) 66'	Report	Peňaška 29'; Ľupták (yellow card) 59'; Boroš (yellow card) 90'	Stadium: Štadión FK Senica; Attendance: 1,612; Referee: Martin Ježík; Assistant referees: Dušan Kubačka, Branislav Hancko

21 September 2013 11	Nitra	1–0	Senica	Nitra
17:30 CEST (UTC+2)	Hála (yellow card) 32'; Bagi (yellow card) 60'; Cléber 71'; Kaspřák (yellow card) 88'	Report	Križko (yellow card) 33'; Habánek (yellow card) 55'; Kalabiška (yellow card) 66'	Stadium: Štadión pod Zoborom; Attendance: 730; Referee: Ivan Kružliak; Assistant referees: Roman Slyško, Mário Roszbeck

28 September 2013 12	Spartak Trnava	1–0	Senica	Trnava
16:00 CEST (UTC+2)	Adámik (yellow card) 17'; Tóth (yellow card) 51'; Janečka (yellow card) 75'; Štepanovský 78'; Chovanec (yellow card) 87'; Hodek (yellow card) 90'	Report	Čermák (yellow card) 80'; Jirásek (yellow card) 83'; Habánek (yellow card) 90'	Stadium: Anton Malatinský Stadium; Attendance: 2,812; Referee: Roman Matúš; Assistant referees: Martin Balko, Peter Bednár

4 October 2013 13	Senica	0–2	Slovan Bratislava	Senica
17:30 CEST (UTC+2)	Hiago (yellow card) 79'; Piroska (red card) 84'; Brabec (yellow card) 84'	Report	Milinković 45'; Fořt 64'; Bagayoko (yellow card) 88'	Stadium: Štadión FK Senica; Attendance: 1,983; Referee: Dušan Sedlák; Assistant referees: Peter Chládek, Peter Jenčura

19 October 2013 14	DAC Dunajská Streda	0–2	Senica	Dunajská Streda
14:00 CEST (UTC+2)	Antunović (yellow card) 19' (red card) 40'; Mešanović (yellow card) 35'; Belic (red card) 72'	Report	Tsoumou (yellow card) 24', (goal) 57'; Pavlík (yellow card) 70'; Kóňa 74'	Stadium: DAC Stadion; Attendance: 700; Referee: Jozef Pavlík; Assistant referees: Milan Cuninka, Peter Bóllo

27 October 2013 15	Trenčín	2–0	Senica	Trenčín
14:30 CET (UTC+1)	Baéz (yellow card) 4'; Alves 22'; Hajradinović 35'	Report	Jirásek (yellow card) 56'; Zeman (yellow card) 60'; Kóňa (yellow card) 62' (red card) 63'; Kalabiška (yellow card) 86'	Stadium: Štadión na Sihoti; Attendance: 2,952; Referee: Richard Trutz; Assistant referees: Ondrej Brendza, Martin Špivák

2 November 2013 16	Senica	3–1	Spartak Myjava	Senica
14:00 CET (UTC+1)	Diviš 13', (yellow card) 78'; Siva 30' (o.g.); Piroska (yellow card) 33'; Pavlík 75'; Kalabiška (yellow card) 90'	Report	Kukoľ (yellow card) 40'; Siva (yellow card) 64'; Černáček 78'	Stadium: Štadión FK Senica; Attendance: 3,509; Referee: Michal Smolák; Assistant referees: Tomáš Somoláni, Mária Súkeníková

9 November 2013 17	Košice	3–1	Senica	Košice
13:30 CET (UTC+1)	Viazanko 4', 38'; Duda 30' (pen.); Šinglár (yellow card) 36'; Diaby (yellow card) 83'	Report	Ventúra (yellow card) 22'; Cristovam (yellow card) 30'; Pavlík (yellow card) 36'; Diarrassouba 81'; Jirásek (yellow card) 90'	Stadium: Štadión Lokomotívy v Čermeli; Attendance: 1,620; Referee: Ján Valášek; Assistant referees: Peter Chládek, Radoslav Bobko

23 November 2013 18	Senica	2–1	Ružomberok	Senica
13:30 CET (UTC+1)	Hiago 7', 65'	Report	Pavlík 20' (o.g.); Adamović (yellow card) 83'	Stadium: Štadión FK Senica; Attendance: 1,460; Referee: Jozef Pavlík; Assistant referees: Martin Vindiš, Milan Cuninka

30 November 2013 19	Žilina	1–3	Senica	Žilina
17:30 CET (UTC+1)	Paur 23' (pen.); Perexta (yellow card) 51'	Report	Hiago 8', (yellow card) 55'; Kosorin 31'; Piroska 76'; Ventúra (yellow card) 79'	Stadium: Štadión pod Dubňom; Attendance: 1,219; Referee: Miroslav Fajčík; Assistant referees: Dušan Hrčka, Karol Poláček

1 March 2014 20	Senica	2–1	ViOn Zlaté Moravce	Senica
14:00 CET (UTC+1)	Sosa 50'; Kalabiška 53'; Piroska (yellow card) 55'	Report	Chrappan (yellow card) 59'; Majerník (yellow card) 87'; Hadžić 90'	Stadium: Štadión FK Senica; Attendance: 1,728; Referee: Ľubomír Samotný; Assistant referees: Martin Balko, Dušan Kubačka

8 March 2014 21	Dukla Banská Bystrica	3–1	Senica	Banská Bystrica
15:00 CET (UTC+1)	Považanec 13', 75', (yellow card) 55'; Teixeira 58'	Report	Pavlík 20'; Mazáň (yellow card) 41'	Stadium: Štadión SNP; Attendance: 1,710; Referee: Ján Valášek; Assistant referees: Tomáš Mókoš, Dušan Petríček

15 March 2014 22	Senica	2–1	Nitra	Senica
14:00 CET (UTC+1)	Piroska (yellow card) 50', (goal) 81'; Opiela 69'; Kosorin (yellow card) 90'	Report	Kostelný 3'; Kutra (yellow card) 41'; Augustín (yellow card) 48'; Böhm (yellow card) 85'	Stadium: Štadión FK Senica; Attendance: 1,025; Referee: Jozef Pavlík; Assistant referees: Roman Slyško, Karol Poláček

24 March 2014 23	Senica	0–1	Spartak Trnava	Senica
18:30 CET (UTC+1)	Kalabiška (yellow card) 37'; Gava (yellow card) 75'	Report	Habánek (yellow card) 9'; Tóth (yellow card) 13' (red card) 70'; E. Sabo (yellow card) 33', (goal) 40'; Vyskočil (yellow card) 75'	Stadium: Štadión FK Senica; Attendance: 3,358; Referee: Pavol Chmura; Assistant referees: Peter Jenčura, Martin Borsányi

31 March 2014 24	Slovan Bratislava	2–0	Senica	Bratislava
18:30 CEST (UTC+2)	Soumah (yellow card) 5'; Vittek 11', 44', (yellow card) 47'; Josimov (yellow card) 33'; Gorosito (yellow card) 40'; Bagi (yellow card) 66'	Report	Gava (yellow card) 28'; Piroska (yellow card) 38'	Stadium: Pasienky; Attendance: 1,754; Referee: Peter Kráľovič; Assistant referees: Martin Balko, Radoslav Bobko

5 April 2014 25	Senica	3–3	DAC Dunajská Streda	Senica
17:30 CEST (UTC+2)	Irobiso 11'; Opiela (yellow card) 20' (yellow-red card) 86'; Hiago 37'; Chvátal (yellow card) 67'; Piroska 79'	Report	Gergel 22'; Szarka 26', 42', (red card) 48'; Krišto (yellow card) 44'; Klabník (yellow card) 88'; O. Szabó (yellow card) 90'	Stadium: Štadión FK Senica; Attendance: 1,728; Referee: Ján Valášek; Assistant referees: Radomír Sluk, Mário Roszbeck

12 April 2014 26	Senica	2–1	Trenčín	Senica
17:30 CEST (UTC+2)	Ventúra (yellow card) 59'; Piroska 79' (pen.), 86'; Mazáň (yellow card) 89'	Report	Ďuriška (yellow card) 78' (red card) 86'; Mišák 90'; Baéz (yellow card) 90'	Stadium: Štadión FK Senica; Attendance: 2,044; Referee: Gabriel Michlian; Assistant referees: Erik Weiss, Juraj Lieskovský

19 April 2014 27	Spartak Myjava	2–0	Senica	Myjava
19:00 CEST (UTC+2)	Kosík 59'; Pekár (yellow card) 76'; Černáček 85'	Report	Hiago (yellow card) 38'; Kosorin (red card) 90'	Stadium: Stadium Myjava; Attendance: 2,573; Referee: Richard Trutz; Assistant referees: Peter Bóllo, Rastislav Žákech

26 April 2014 28	Senica	3–2	Košice	Senica
17:30 CEST (UTC+2)	Irobiso (yellow card) 14'; Cristovam 19'; Mazáň (yellow card) 38'; Kalabiška 40'; Pavlík (yellow card) 57'; Gava (yellow card) 64'; Piroska 69', (red card) 84'	Report	Pačinda 9', (yellow card) 76'; Sekulić (yellow card) 21'; Šinglár 23'; Diaby (yellow card) 47'; Kavka (yellow card) 68'	Stadium: Štadión FK Senica; Attendance: 1,385; Referee: Roman Matúš; Assistant referees: Peter Bednár, Branislav Hancko

3 May 2014 29	Ružomberok	0–0	Senica	Ružomberok
17:30 CEST (UTC+2)	Maslo (yellow card) 18'; Zreľák (yellow card) 86'	Report	Gava (yellow card) 40'; Pavlík (red card) 57'	Stadium: Štadión MFK Ružomberok; Attendance: 1,311; Referee: Pavol Šuniar; Assistant referees: Martin Balko, Henrich Mikulaj

10 May 2014 30	Senica	1–4	Žilina	Senica
17:30 CEST (UTC+2)	Ventúra 44'	Report	Jelić (yellow card) 1'; Škriniar 13' (pen.); Hučko 42'; Alves 66'; Káčer 68'	Stadium: Štadión FK Senica; Attendance: 1,490; Referee: Michal Smolák; Assistant referees: Michal Tomčík, Peter Bóllo

17 May 2014 31	ViOn Zlaté Moravce	2–1	Senica	Zlaté Moravce
17:30 CEST (UTC+2)	L. Szabó 58'; Chrappan (yellow card) 63', (goal) 86'; L. Kováč (yellow card) 72'	Report	Kalabiška (yellow card) 78'	Stadium: Štadión FC ViOn; Attendance: 943; Referee: Marek Mastiš; Assistant referees: Ondrej Brendza, Martin Borsányi

20 May 2014 32	Senica	1–1	Dukla Banská Bystrica	Senica
17:30 CEST (UTC+2)	Kalabiška 77' (pen.)	Report	Peňaška 3'; Podstavek (yellow card) 51'; Nosko (yellow card) 76'	Stadium: Štadión FK Senica; Attendance: 1,058; Referee: Štefan Leško; Assistant referees: Radomír Sluk, Martin Špivák

31 May 2014 33	Nitra	2–0	Senica	Nitra
17:30 CEST (UTC+2)	Mikuš 20'; Cléber 29' (pen.); Husár (yellow card) 80'	Report	Kosorin (yellow card) 65'	Stadium: Štadión pod Zoborom; Attendance: 560; Referee: Patrik Hrčka; Assistant referees: Henrich Mikulaj, Dušan Petríček

=== Slovak Cup ===
27 August 2013 Second round	Spartak Vráble	0–0 (3–4 p)	Senica	Vráble
17:00 CEST (UTC+2)		Report		Stadium: Štadión FK Spartak Vráble; Attendance: 650; Referee: Rastislav Jurenka; Assistant referees: Juraj Lieskovský, Rastislav Žákech
Note: Senica won 4–3 on penalties.

24 September 2013 Third round	Rimavská Sobota	1–1 (5–6 p)	Senica	Rimavská Sobota
16:00 CEST (UTC+2)	Migaľa (yellow card) 59'; Zvara 85'	Report	Tsoumou 32'; Šenk (yellow card) 45'	Stadium: Na Zahradkach Stadium; Attendance: 588; Referee: Dušan Sedlák; Assistant referees: Erik Weiss, Radoslav Bobko
Note: Senica won 6–5 on penalties.

23 October 2013 Quarter-finals First leg	Senica	3–0; Awarded	ViOn Zlaté Moravce	Senica
17:30 CEST (UTC+2)	Kóňa (yellow card) 68'; Diarrassouba 70'; Brabec (yellow card) 82'	Report	Pintér (yellow card) 11'; Mazan 33'; P. Sabo (yellow card) 43'; L. Szabó 59'	Stadium: Štadión FK Senica; Attendance: 822; Referee: Miroslav Jaška; Assistant referees: Peter Chládek, Peter Bednár; Fourth official: Vladimír Hracho

5 November 2013 Quarter-finals Second leg	ViOn Zlaté Moravce	0–1 (0–4 agg.)	Senica	Zlaté Moravce
16:30 CEST (UTC+2)	Obročník (yellow card) 19'; Bolinha (yellow card) 78'; Chrappan (yellow card) 86'	Report	Tsoumou (yellow card) 23'; Piroska (yellow card) 27'; Jirásek (yellow card) 71'; Pavlík (yellow card) 86'; Ventúra 90'	Stadium: Štadión FC ViOn; Attendance: 500; Referee: Gabriel Michlian; Assistant referees: Dušan Hrčka, Martin Vindiš; Fourth official: Roman Matúš
Note: Senica won 4–0 on aggregate.

8 April 2014 Semi-finals First leg	Senica	1–3	Slovan Bratislava	Senica
17:30 CEST (UTC+2)	Piroska 30', (yellow card) 53'; Opiela (yellow card) 54'	Report	Vittek 14', (yellow card) 60'; Peltier 17'; Milinković (yellow card) 42'; Soumah 69'; Gorosito (yellow card) 81'	Stadium: Štadión FK Senica; Attendance: 1,324; Referee: Vladimír Vnuk; Assistant referees: Peter Chládek, Michal Tomčík; Fourth official: Dušan Kubačka

15 April 2014 Semi-finals Second leg	Slovan Bratislava	3–0 (6–1 agg.)	Senica	Bratislava
13:00 CEST (UTC+2)	Halenár 4'; Vrablec (yellow card) 26'; Gorosito 44'; Milinković (yellow card) 58', (goal) 75'; Bagi (yellow card) 61'	Report	Cristovam (yellow card) 21'; Opiela (yellow card) 71'	Stadium: Pasienky; Attendance: 3,565; Referee: Ľubomír Samotný; Assistant referees: Miroslav Benko, Tomáš Vorel; Fourth official: Dušan Petríček
Note: Slovan Bratislava won 6–1 on aggregate.

=== UEFA Europa League ===
==== Qualifying ====
===== Second qualifying round =====
18 July 2013 First leg	Mladost Podgorica (Montenegro)	2–2	(Slovakia) Senica	Podgorica, Montenegro
17:30 CEST (UTC+2)	Knežević 54' (pen.), (yellow card) 87'; Sanković (yellow card) 71'; Ishihara 86'; Novović (yellow card) 90'	Report	Diviš (yellow card) 24'; Kalabiška 34'; Diarrassouba 77', (yellow card) 87'; Zeman (yellow card) 90+4'	Stadium: Podgorica City Stadium; Attendance: 4,500; Referee: Vitali Meshkov (Russia); Assistant referees: Maksim Gavrilin (Russia), Igor Demeshko (Russia); Fourth official: Sergei Kuznetsov (Russia)

25 July 2013 Second leg	Senica (Slovakia)	0–1 (2–3 agg.)	(Montenegro) Mladost Podgorica	Senica, Slovakia
19:30 CEST (UTC+2)	Piroska (yellow card) 55'; Čermák (yellow card) 61'; Križko (yellow card) 88'	Report	Kaljević (yellow card) 14', (goal) 38'; Sanković (yellow card) 21'; Šofranac (yellow card) 83'; Seratlić (yellow card) 86'	Stadium: Štadión FK Senica; Attendance: 3,908; Referee: Anar Salmanov (Azerbaijan); Assistant referees: Yashar Abbasov (Azerbaijan), Namik Huseynov (Azerbaijan); Fourth official: Orkhan Mammadov (Azerbaijan)
Note: Mladost Podgorica won 3–2 on aggregate.
