= 2015 Slovak Cup final =

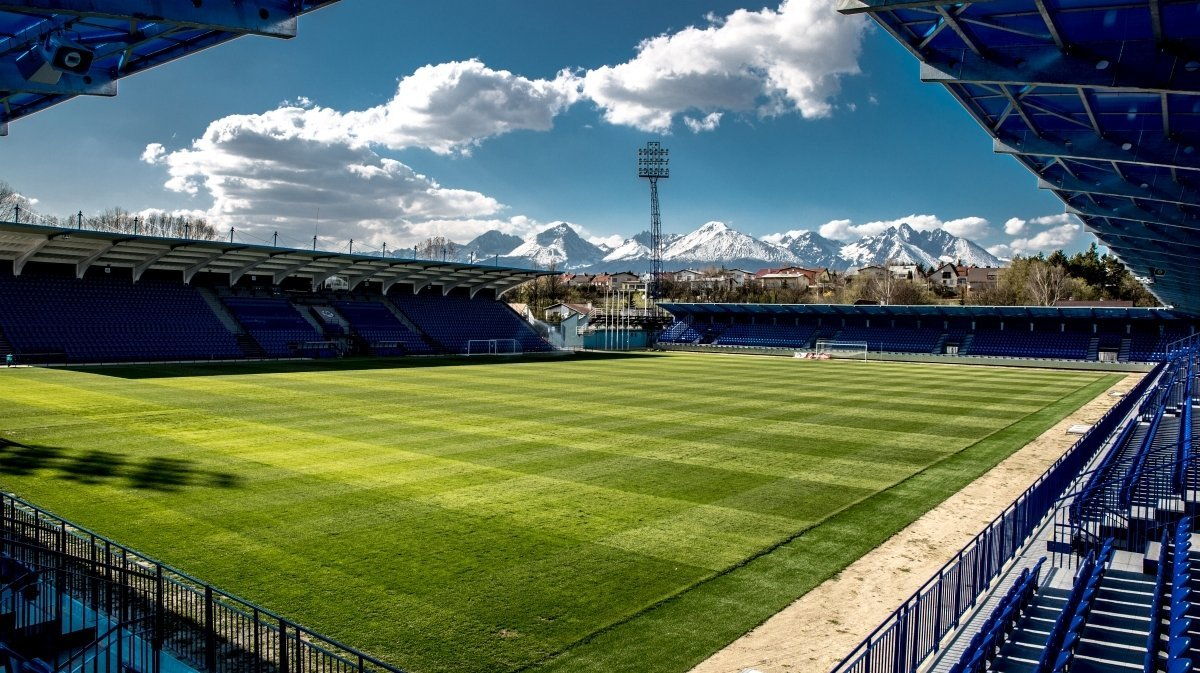
- The NTC Poprad in Poprad held the final
- Event: 2014–15 Slovak Cup
Trenčín	Senica
2	2
- After extra time Trenčín won 3–2 on penalties
- Date: 1 May 2015
- Venue: NTC Poprad, Poprad
- Referee: Richard Trutz
- Attendance: 3,473

The 2015 Slovak Cup final (known as the Slovnaft Cup for sponsorship reasons) was the final match of the 2014–15 Slovak Cup, the 46th season of the top cup competition in Slovak football. The match was played at the NTC Poprad in Poprad on 1 May 2015 between AS Trenčín and Senica. AS Trenčín defeated FK Senica 3-2 after penalties.

== Road to the final ==
AS Trenčín		Round	FK Senica
Opponent	Result	2014–15 Slovak Cup	Opponent	Result
ŠK Strážske	4–0	Second Round	OFC Gabčíkovo	4–1
Lokomotíva Košice	2−1	Third Round	Baník Horná Nitra	1–0
Lokomotíva Zvolen	2−0	Fourth Round	MFK Nová Baňa	3–2
ViOn Zlaté Moravce	3−1	Round of 16	FC Rohožník	4–1
Slovan Bratislava	2–1	Quarter-finals	Spartak Trnava	2–1
Dukla Banská Bystrica	2–0, 1–0	Semi-finals	DAC 1904 Dunajská Streda	0–1, 1–0 (6–5 pen.)

== Match ==
=== Details ===
1 May 2015
18:15 CEST

AS Trenčín	2–2 (a.e.t.)	Senica
Ibrahim 36' van Kessel 110'	Report	Čögley 4' (o.g.); Kalabiška 115'
Penalties
van Kessel (penalty missed); Lobotka (penalty scored); Mondek (penalty scored); Rundić (penalty scored)	3–2	(penalty missed) Majtán; (penalty scored) Hlohovský; (penalty scored) Opiela; (penalty missed) Kóňa; (penalty missed) Kalabiška

NTC Poprad, Poprad
Attendance: 3,473
Referee: Richard Trutz

FK AS Trenčín	FK Senica

AS Trenčín:
GK	24	(Slovakia) Igor Šemrinec (c)
RB	17	(Slovakia) Peter Čögley
CB	3	(Serbia) Milan Rundić (yellow card) 58'
CB	22	(Brazil) Ramón
LB	15	(Nigeria) Kingsley Madu	(substituted off) 72'
CM	10	(Nigeria) Rabiu Ibrahim
CM	29	(Slovakia) Stanislav Lobotka (yellow card) 39'
RM	77	(Curaçao) Gino van Kessel
LM	19	(Slovakia) Dávid Guba	(substituted off) 55'
AM	21	(Slovakia) Matúš Bero	(substituted off) 65'
FW	11	(Brazil) Jairo
Substitutions:
GK	32	(Slovakia) Matej Vozár
CB	2	(Slovakia) Lukáš Skovajsa
CB	37	(Slovakia) Peter Kleščík
CM	8	(Netherlands) Ryan Koolwijk	(substituted in) 65'
DM	18	(England) James Lawrence	(substituted in) 72'
RW	16	(Slovakia) Karol Mondek	(substituted in) 55'
FW	26	(Slovakia) Martin Vlček
Manager:
Martin Ševela

FK Senica:
GK	1	(Slovakia) Michal Šulla
RB	23	(Slovakia) Lukáš Opiela (yellow card) 111'
CB	4	(Slovakia) Petr Pavlík
CB	17	(Slovakia) Róbert Pillár
LB	8	(Czech Republic) Pavel Čermák
DM	20	(Czech Republic) Luboš Hušek	(substituted off) 113'
CM	6	(Slovakia) Tomáš Kóňa (c)
CM	13	(Slovakia) Filip Hlohovský
RW	10	(Slovakia) Jozef Dolný (yellow card) 57'	(substituted off) 89'
LW	19	(Czech Republic) Jan Kalabiška
FW	9	(Slovakia) Tomáš Majtán (yellow card) 77'
Substitutions:
GK	39	(Slovakia) Martin Junas
CB	2	(Slovakia) Martin Privrel
CB	14	(Slovakia) Marek Pittner	(substituted in) 113'
CB	26	(Slovakia) Július Gombala
MF	5	(Slovakia) Jakub Krč
CM	7	(Slovakia) Tomáš Komara
FW	25	(Slovakia) Jakub Kosorin	(substituted in) 89'
Manager:
Jozef Kostelník

Assistant referees:

- (Slovakia) Tomáš Somoláni
- (Slovakia) Gabriel Ádám

Fourth official:

- (Slovakia) Karol Poláček
