= Denis Ventúra =

Slovak footballer

Personal information
- Date of birth: 1 August 1995 (age 31)
- Place of birth: Senica, Slovakia
- Height: 1.81 m (5 ft 11 in)
- Position: Midfielder

Team information
- Current team: Ruch Chorzów
- Number: 25

Youth career
- –2013: Senica

Senior career*
| Years | Team | Apps | (Gls) |
| 2013–2016 | Senica | 33 | (1) |
| 2016–2019 | iClinic Sereď | 90 | (7) |
| 2020–2022 | Academica Clinceni | 49 | (2) |
| 2022 | Gyirmót | 12 | (3) |
| 2022–2024 | Sigma Olomouc | 50 | (4) |
| 2024 | Sigma Olomouc B | 1 | (0) |
| 2024– | Ruch Chorzów | 63 | (7) |

International career
| 2012–2013 | Slovakia U18 | 7 | (0) |
| 2014 | Slovakia U20 | 1 | (0) |
- * Club domestic league appearances and goals as of 14:51, 29 May 2026 (UTC)

Denis Ventúra (born 1 August 1995) is a Slovak professional footballer who plays as a midfielder for Polish club Ruch Chorzów.

== Career ==
=== FK Senica ===
He made his professional debut for Senica in the Europa League qualifying away fixture against Hungarian team MTK Budapest on 5 July 2012. Senica tied the game 1–1 and Ventúra came on as a stoppage time replacement for Martin Ďurica. He remained benched in the home fixture, where Senica won 2–1, by goals of Rolando Blackburn and Jan Kalabiška, to advance on aggregate and face APOEL Nicosia. Ventúra did not appear in those games, as Senica were knocked out by the aggregate score of 0–3.

His Corgoň Liga debut came on 26 May 2013 against Nitra. Ventúra was featured from the start, completing 80 minutes, before being replaced by Juraj Križko. Still, while on the pitch, Ventúra had witnessed Róbert Pillár's only goal of the match in the first half.

=== Academica Clinceni ===
After three-and-a-half years at iClinic Sereď, Ventúra had signed a contract with Romanian Academica Clinceni. The Academics were a top division club at that point, but at the time of Ventúra's transfer, they were second to last and it was determined, that they were set to battle in the Relegation phase during the spring. Ventúra's defensive skills were to minimise the number of conceded goals. Ventúra joined his fellow countrymen and a striker Jakub Vojtuš, who joined the side in the summer of 2019.

Ventúra made his competitive debut in the first possible match, on 1 February 2020, against Voluntari, although he was featured in some friendly games over the winter break. In the fixture against Voluntari, Ventúra was featured in the starting line-up, playing as a defensive midfielder. While Academica took the lead through Adrian Șut, an unconverted penalty by Eugeniu Cebotaru, equaliser by Marko Simonovski and a second-half winner Mihai Căpățînă meant that Clinceni had lost 1–2. During the half-time Ventúra was replaced by Robert Ion.

=== Ruch Chorzów ===
On 21 June 2024, Ventúra signed a contract with Polish second division club Ruch Chorzów until 30 June 2026. On 30 May 2026, Ruch announced that Ventúra had signed a contract extension keeping him at the club until 30 June 2028, with an option for an additional year. Ventúra had been a key player during the 2025–26 I liga campaign, appearing in 29 league matches, scoring five goals, and providing five assists. Despite his individual performance, Ruch finished the season in 7th place, narrowly missing out on the Ekstraklasa promotion play-offs.

== Honours ==
FK Senica

- Slovak Cup runner-up: 2014–15

iClinic Sereď

- 2. Liga: 2017–18
