= Kosorin =

Kosorin may refer to:

- Kosořín, a municipality and village in the Czech Republic
- Kosorín, a municipality and village in Slovakia
- Jakub Kosorin (born 1995), Slovak football forward
