= Jakub Krč =

Slovak footballer

Personal information
- Full name: Jakub Krč
- Date of birth: 2 September 1997 (age 29)
- Place of birth: Skalica, Slovakia
- Height: 1.74 m (5 ft 9 in)
- Positions: Left back; midfielder

Team information
- Current team: TJ Slavoj Boleráz

Youth career
- Senica

Senior career*
| Years | Team | Apps | (Gls) |
| 2015–2019 | Senica | 76 | (0) |
| 2016–2017 | → Sereď (loan) | 18 | (1) |
| 2020 | Spartak Trnava | 2 | (0) |
| 2021-2024 | Sokol Lanžhot | ? | (?) |
| 2024- | TJ Slavoj Boleráz | | |

International career
| 2013–2014 | Slovakia U17 | 3 | (2) |
| 2014–2015 | Slovakia U18 | 5 | (2) |
| 2015–2016 | Slovakia U19 | 6 | (0) |
- * Club domestic league appearances and goals as of 21:04, 2 September 2021 (UTC)

Jakub Krč (born 2 September 1997) is a Slovak footballer who plays as a left back or a midfielder for Slavoj Boleraz.

== Club career ==
=== FK Senica ===
Before the spring part of the 2013/14 season, Krč worked his way into the first team. On February 21, 2014, he won the poll for the city's best athlete of 2013 in the collective category of juniors U17. On February 25, 2015, he won the autumn 2014 poll for the city's best athlete of 2014 in the U19 collective category. He made his debut in the Slovak top flight under coach Eduard Pagáč in a league match of the 25th round played on April 10, 2015 against MŠK Žilina, replacing Pavel Čermák in the 64th minute. In January 2018, Krč signed an extension to his contract with Senica. He featured in a 1–0 win against the then holders of the league title Spartak Trnava.

=== Spartak Trnava ===
In the summer of 2020, it was announced that Krč had signed for fellow league outfit FC Spartak Trnava. He got injured in training, and would only debut in March of the next year, playing the majority of a 2–1 victory over FC ViOn Zlaté Moravce.

== International career ==
Krč has made appearances for the Slovak U17, U18, and U19 youth categories.
