= Tomáš Komara =

Slovak footballer (born 1994)

Personal information
- Full name: Tomáš Komara
- Date of birth: 23 May 1994 (age 32)
- Place of birth: Spišské Podhradie, Slovakia
- Height: 1.71 m (5 ft 7 in)
- Position: Midfielder

Team information
- Current team: Spišské Podhradie

Youth career
- Tatran Prešov
- Senica

Senior career*
Years	Team	Apps	(Gls)
2013–2016	Senica	46	(2)
2016–2018	Valašské Meziříčí	1	(0)
2017	→ FK Hodonín (loan)	10	(0)
2018–	Spišské Podhradie	283	(42)
- * Club domestic league appearances and goals as of 07:05, 19 March 2026 (UTC)

Tomáš Komara (born 23 May 1994) is a Slovak football midfielder who plays for 3. liga club Spišské Podhradie as a player-coach.

During his career, he played for FK Senica, Czech teams TJ Valašské Meziříčí and FK Hodonín and later Spišské Podhradie.

== Club career ==
=== FK Senica ===
A native of Spišské Podhradie, Komara started playing football at the age of 14 at 1. FC Tatran Prešov, from where he left for the academy of FK Senica. He gradually worked his way up through the U19 team to the first team in the summer of 2013. In June 2013, he was with the Senica youth team at a tournament in The Hague, where he was named the best player of the tournament. He made his debut in the Slovak top flight under coach Eduard Pagáč in the 4th round league match on 4 August 2013 against FK AS Trenčín, coming on as a substitute for Milan Jirásek in the 87th minute of a 3–1 win. He scored his first goal for Senica in the 31st round league match on 20 May 2015 against MFK Ružomberok.

=== Later career ===
After leaving Senica and playing for Czech clubs TJ Valašské Meziříčí and FK Hodonín, Komara would return to his former club, MŠK Spišské Podhradie. After getting a UEFA A coaching license, he became the player-manager of the club. He led the team to a 12 game unbeaten run in 2023.

== International career ==
Komara played for the Slovakia national under-15 football team in a 5–0 win against the youth team of Slovan Bratislava, scoring the third goal.
