= Hiago (footballer) =

Brazilian footballer (born 1991)

Hiago Ramiro
Personal information
- Full name: Hiago de Oliveira Ramiro
- Date of birth: 20 September 1991 (age 35)
- Place of birth: Ariquemes, Brazil
- Height: 1.75 m (5 ft 9 in)
- Position: Winger

Team information
- Current team: Independente Futebol Clube

Youth career
- Juventude

Senior career*
| Years | Team | Apps | (Gls) |
| 2010–2011 | Juventude B | | |
| 2010–2012 | Juventude | 3 | (0) |
| 2012 | UTA Arad | 7 | (0) |
| 2013 | Canoas | 0 | (0) |
| 2013– | Arapongas | 0 | (0) |
| 2013–2014 | → Senica (loan) | 31 | (5) |
| 2014–2015 | Londrina | 4 | (0) |
| 2016 | Maringá | 0 | (0) |
| 2016–2017 | Sergipe | 5 | (0) |
| 2017 | Fortaleza | 24 | (3) |
| 2018 | Kalmar FF | 25 | (4) |
| 2019 | CSA | 0 | (0) |
| 2019 | Botafogo PB | 4 | (0) |
| 2020– | Inter de Limeira | 0 | (0) |
- * Club domestic league appearances and goals as of 12:39, 20 April 2020 (UTC)

Hiago de Oliveira Ramiro (born 20 September 1991), commonly known as Hiago, is a Brazilian footballer who plays as a winger for Independente Futebol Clube.

== Career ==
On 27 June 2013, Senica signed Hiago together with his teammate Cristovam on one-year loan with option to buy from Brazilian club Arapongas. He made his debut for Senica on 13 July 2013 against Spartak Trnava, Senica defeated Spartak Trnava 2–1.

On 19 January 2018, it was announced by Kalmar FF that they had signed Hiago for the upcoming 2018 Allsvenskan season. Hiago is the fifth Brazilian player to be signed by Kalmar since 2015, joining current squad members Romário and Nixon (on loan from Flamengo). Hiago started the first three games of the season on the substitute bench, being introduced each time late in the second half. In round 4 Hiago started his first full competitive match for the club against Östersund and scored his first competitive goal for the club in the 53rd minute, to equalise at 1–1. This was the final score in the match. In the next round, Hiago again was given a start and again found the net, this time in the 61st minute against newly promoted Trelleborg, his goal being the only one of the match and giving Kalmar their first win of the season. Continuing his hot form streak, he then started the following match against reigning Allsvenskan champions Malmö FF and in the 45th minute scored his team's third goal in an upset 3–0 home win for Kalmar.

Hiago joined CSA for the 2019 season. On 25 April 2019, he then moved to Botafogo PB. In December 2019, he signed a pre-contract with Inter de Limeira for the 2020 season.
