= Alexander Jakubov =

Czech footballer (born 1991)

Personal information
- Date of birth: 11 January 1991 (age 35)
- Place of birth: Prague, Czechoslovakia
- Height: 1.93 m (6 ft 4 in)
- Position: Forward

Youth career
- Košice
- Inter Bratislava
- Horn
- Sparta Prague
- Porto

Senior career*
Years	Team	Apps	(Gls)
2010–2013	Sparta Prague	0	(0)
2011–2012	Slavoj Žatec		
2012–2013	→ Sparta Prague B	6	(8)
2013	→ Senica (loan)	7	(1)
2014	→ Vlašim (loan)	9	(3)
2015–2016	Budissa Bautzen	4	(5)
2016	Varnsdorf	14	(10)
2017–2018	Baník Ostrava	10	(1)
2018	→ Ústí nad Labem (loan)	14	(6)
2018–2019	Zlín	19	(1)
2019–2020	Vlašim	9	(0)
- * Club domestic league appearances and goals

Alexander Jakubov (born 11 January 1991) is a Czech former professional footballer who played as a forward.

== Personal life ==
Jakubov was born in Prague and started playing football in Košice. He comes from a Czech-Slovak family.

== Club career ==
=== Early career ===
Jakubov began his football career at MFK Košice, from where he went to the Inter Bratislava youth academy and then to SV Horn, Sparta Prague and FC Porto. In 2010, he returned to Sparta and a year later signed for Slavoj Žatec. The following season, he played for Sparta's reserve team and before the 2013/14 season, he went on a one-year loan to FK Senica. Jakubov made his professional debut for Senica on 13 July 2013 against Spartak Trnava, coming off the bench in the 83rd minute, Jakubov would not make an affect in the 2–1 historic win for Senica.

=== Later career ===
In the winter of 2013/14, he returned to his regular team. In the summer of 2014, he went on loan to Graffin Vlašim. In January 2015, he transferred to the German lower league club FSV Budissa Bautzen. In the summer of 2016, he returned to the Czech Republic to FK Varnsdorf. In January 2017, he transferred to FC Baník Ostrava. He was one of two Ostrava players to join Second League side FK Ústí nad Labem in January 2018, alongside goalkeeper Petr Vašek. Jakubov scored two goals and assisted another in a 3–1 away win at FC Hradec Králové in May, lifting his team out of the relegation places. In July 2018, Jakubov joined FC Zlín, signing a three-year contract. In July 2019, Jakubov returned to Second League club Vlašim, previously having played for the club in 2014.

== Post-football career ==
In 2020, Jakubov retired from professional football, becoming a coach to youth players.
