= Cristovam (footballer) =

Brazilian footballer (born 1990)

Personal information
- Full name: Cristovam Roberto Ribeiro da Silva
- Date of birth: 25 July 1990 (age 36)
- Place of birth: Feira de Santana, Brazil
- Height: 1.76 m (5 ft 9 in)
- Position: Right back

Team information
- Current team: Brusque
- Number: 22

Youth career
- 2008–2009: Internacional
- 2010: Corinthians

Senior career*
Years	Team	Apps	(Gls)
2009	Guaratinguetá	1	(0)
2011	Corinthians	0	(0)
2011	Flamengo-SP	18	(0)
2012	Feirense	10	(1)
2013–2014	Arapongas	18	(2)
2013–2014	→ Senica (loan)	11	(1)
2014	Londrina	1	(0)
2014–2017	J. Malucelli	9	(0)
2017–2020	Paraná	34	(1)
2018	→ Suwon Samsung Bluewings (loan)	4	(0)
2018	→ Bucheon FC (loan)	9	(2)
2019	→ Ceará (loan)	15	(0)
2020	Guarani	33	(0)
2021	CSA	5	(0)
2022	São Bernardo	10	(0)
2022–2023	Criciúma	73	(1)
2024–	Brusque	11	(3)
- * Club domestic league appearances and goals as of 03:44, 28 March 2024

Cristovam Roberto Ribeiro da Silva (born 25 July 1990), simply known as Cristovam, is a Brazilian footballer who plays as a right back for Brusque.

== Club career ==
=== Guaratinguetá ===
Cristovam made his league debut against SE do Gama on 27 June 2009.

=== Flamengo-SP ===
Cristovam made his league debut against CA Juventus on 13 February 2011.

=== Feirense ===
Cristovam scored on his league debut against EC Vitória on 18 January 2012, scoring in the 78th minute.

=== Arapongas ===
Cristovam made his league debut against Cianorte on 20 January 2013. He scored his first goal for the club against Londrina on 3 February 2013, scoring in the 87th minute.

=== Senica ===
On 27 June 2013, FK Senica signed Cristovam together with his teammate Hiago on one-year loan with option to buy from Brazilian club Arapongas. He made his debut for FK Senica on 13 July 2013 against FC Spartak Trnava, as Senica defeated Spartak Trnava 2-1. He scored his first goal for the club against Košice on 26 April 2014, scoring in the 19th minute.

=== Londrina ===
Cristovam made his league debut against Penapolense on 30 August 2014.

=== J. Malucelli ===
Cristovam made his league debut against Rio Branco Sport Club on 1 February 2015.

=== Paraná ===
Cristovam made his league debut against ABC on 13 May 2017. He scored his first goal for the club against Guarani SP on 20 September 2017, scoring in the 52nd minute.

=== Suwon Samsung Bluewings ===
On 29 December 2017, Cristovam joined K League 1 club Suwon Samsung Bluewings. He made his league debut against Jeonnam Dragons on 1 March 2018.

=== Bucheon FC ===
Cristovam scored on his league debut against Busan IPark on 14 July 2018, scoring in the 60 and 66th minute.

=== Ceará ===
Cristovam joined Ceará for the 2019 season. He made his league debut against CRB on 26 January 2019.

=== Guarani ===
Cristovam made his league debut against Mirassol on 31 January 2020.

=== CSA ===
Cristovam made his league debut against CEO on 3 March 2021.

=== São Bernardo ===
Cristovam made his league debut against Santo André on 2 February 2022.

=== Criciúma ===
Cristovam made his league debut against Londrina on 15 April 2022. He scored his first goal for the club against Atlético Catarinense on 7 March 2023, scoring in the 66th minute.

=== Brusque ===
Cristovam made his league debut against Barra SC on 21 January 2024. He scored his first goal for the club against Concórdia on 7 February 2024, scoring in the 90th+2nd minute.

== Career statistics ==
As of 25 November 2023

Appearances and goals by club, season and competition
Club	Season	League			State League		Cup		Continental		Other		Total	
Club	Season	Division	Apps	Goals	Apps	Goals	Apps	Goals	Apps	Goals	Apps	Goals	Apps	Goals
Guaratinguetá	2009	Série C	1	0	—		—		—		—		1	0
Flamengo-SP	2011	Paulista A3	—		18	0	—		—		—		18	0
Feirense	2012	Baiano	—		10	1	—		—		—		10	1
Arapongas	2013	Paranaense	—		18	2	4	1	—		—		22	3
Senica (loan)	2013–14	Corgoň Liga	11	1	—		2	0	—		—		13	1
Londrina	2014	Série D	1	0	—		—		—		—		1	0
J. Malucelli	2015	Série D	0	0	12	0	—		—		—		12	0
J. Malucelli	2016	Série D	9	0	12	0	—		—		—		21	0
J. Malucelli	2017	Série D	—		10	0	—		—		—		10	0
J. Malucelli	Total		9	0	34	0	—		—		—		43	0
Paraná	2017	Série B	32	1	—		—		—		2	0	34	1
Suwon Samsung Bluewings (loan)	2018	K League 1	4	0	—		0	0	5	1	—		9	1
Bucheon FC (loan)	2018	K League 2	9	2	—		0	0	—		—		9	2
Ceará (loan)	2019	Série A	8	0	4	0	0	0	—		3	0	15	0
Guarani	2020	Série B	27	0	6	0	—		—		—		33	0
CSA	2021	Série B	13	0	4	0	0	0	—		4	0	21	0
São Bernardo	2022	Série D	—		10	0	—		—		—		10	0
Criciúma	2022	Série B	33	0	—		—		—		—		33	0
Criciúma	2023	Série B	26	0	14	1	2	0	—		—		42	1
Criciúma	Total		59	0	14	1	2	0	—		—		75	1
Career total			174	4	118	4	8	1	5	1	9	0	314	10

== Honours ==
CSA

- Campeonato Alagoano: 2021
