= Ivan Kmotrík =

Slovak businessman (born 1959)

Ivan Kmotrík (born 14 April 1959 in Skalica) is a Slovak businessman, mostly known for his involvement in the ŠK Slovan Bratislava football club. He is also owner of Grafobal group, TV channel TA3, OMS Lighting, and university Stredoeurópska vysoká škola v Skalici.
