= Štadión FK Senica =

Football stadium in Senica, Slovakia

OMS Arena Senica
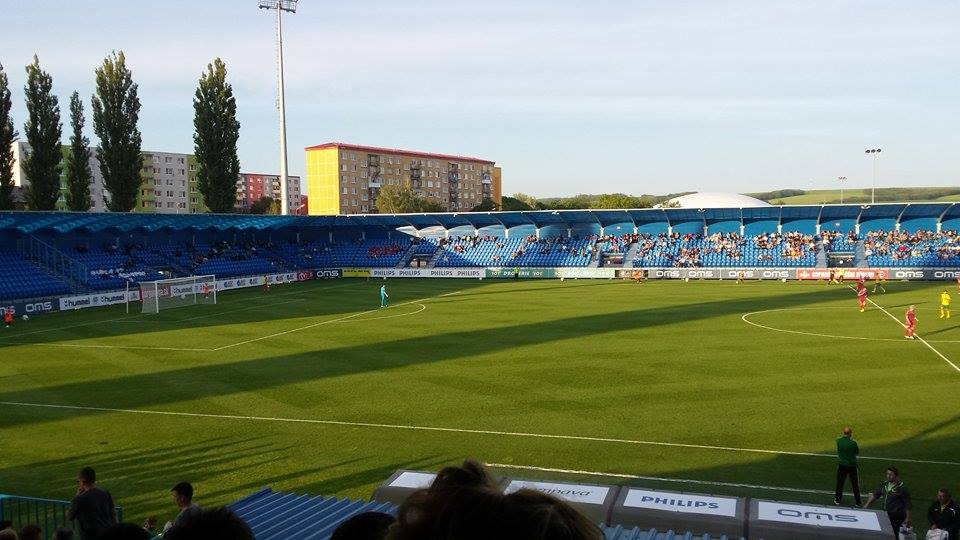
- UEFA
- Interactive map of OMS Arena Senica
- Former names: Futbalový štadión Senica
- Location: Sadová ulica 639/22 Senica, Slovakia
- Coordinates: 48°41′2.88″N 17°22′36.51″E
- Owner: OMS Arena Senica a.s.
- Capacity: 5,070
- Surface: Grass
- Field size: 105 x 68 m

Construction
- Opened: October 1962
- Renovated: 2009, 2010, 2012–2015

Tenants
- FK Senica (1962–present); MFK Skalica (2015)

Website
- www.fksenica.eu

OMS Arena, is a multi-purpose stadium in Senica, Slovakia. It is mainly used mostly for football matches and hosts the home matches of FK Senica of the Slovak Superliga. The stadium has a capacity of 5,070 spectators. The intensity of the floodlighting is 1,545 lux.

== History ==
On October 24, 1962, a new football stadium was opened in Senica. The Czechoslovak national football team, with the full squad that had made it to the final of the World Cup in Chile, came to “christen” it. The Senica district team (six players directly from Senica) lost 0–7 to the national team.

During a partial reconstruction in the summer of 2009, the stadium in Senica was modernized with more than 4,000 new seats, repaired covered stands, a new sound system and new facilities for journalists, VIPs and television crews. This was in preparation for the highest football competition in Slovakia. The complete reconstruction of the playing field began after Senica's last home match on 8 May 2010 and lasted until July. For example, preparation for a heated lawn and automatic irrigation were installed. After these modifications, the stadium had a capacity of 4,500 seats, of which the main and opposite stands had a total of 1,743 covered seats.
