= Michal Habánek =

Slovak footballer

Personal information
- Full name: Michal Habánek
- Date of birth: 12 April 1994 (age 32)
- Place of birth: Trenčín, Slovakia
- Height: 1.76 m (5 ft 9 in)
- Position: Right back

Team information
- Current team: Syrianska IF Kerburan

Youth career
- Nové Mesto nad Váhom
- Trenčín
- 2010–2011: Spartak Trnava

Senior career*
Years	Team	Apps	(Gls)
2011–2014	Spartak Trnava	29	(0)
2013	→ Senica (loan)	9	(0)
2014	Ružomberok	8	(0)
2015	TJ Slavoj Boleráz		
2015	Spartak Trnava B	2	(0)
2016–	Syrianska IF Kerburan	0	(0)

International career^{‡}
2009	Slovakia U15		
2011	Slovakia U17	8	(0)
2011	Slovakia U18	6	(0)
2012–2013	Slovakia U19	6	(0)
2012–2013	Slovakia U21	3	(0)
- * Club domestic league appearances and goals as of 10 February 2016 ‡ National team caps and goals as of 9 December 2012

Michal Habánek (born 12 April 1994) is a Slovak football defender who currently plays for Syrianska IF Kerburan.

== Club career ==
He made his league debut for Spartak Trnava against Dunajská Streda on 15 October 2011.
