= OMS Lighting =

OMS Lightning
- Company type: Private
- Industry: Lighting
- Founded: 1995
- Headquarters: Dojč 419, Slovakia
- Area served: Worldwide
- Key people: Vladimír Levársky (CEO)
- Revenue: ▼€65.8 million (2015)
- Net income: ▲€ 83.821 (2015)
- Total assets: ▲€ 53.5 million (2015)
- Total equity: ▲€ 8.418 million (2015)
- Number of employees: 950
- Website: http://www.omslighting.com/

OMS Lightning is a Slovak manufacturer and supplier of LED lighting technology. They specialise in design, industrial LED lamps, and luminaries. OMS Lightning was founded in 1995 in Dojč, Slovakia. 93% of production is exported to 120 countries, White Hart Lane stadium in London is illuminated by OMS.

== Owners ==
In March 2017, Slovak businessman and oligarch Ivan Kmotrík obtained a 70% share of the company for an unspecified fee.
