= Róbert Mazáň =

Slovak footballer (born 1994)

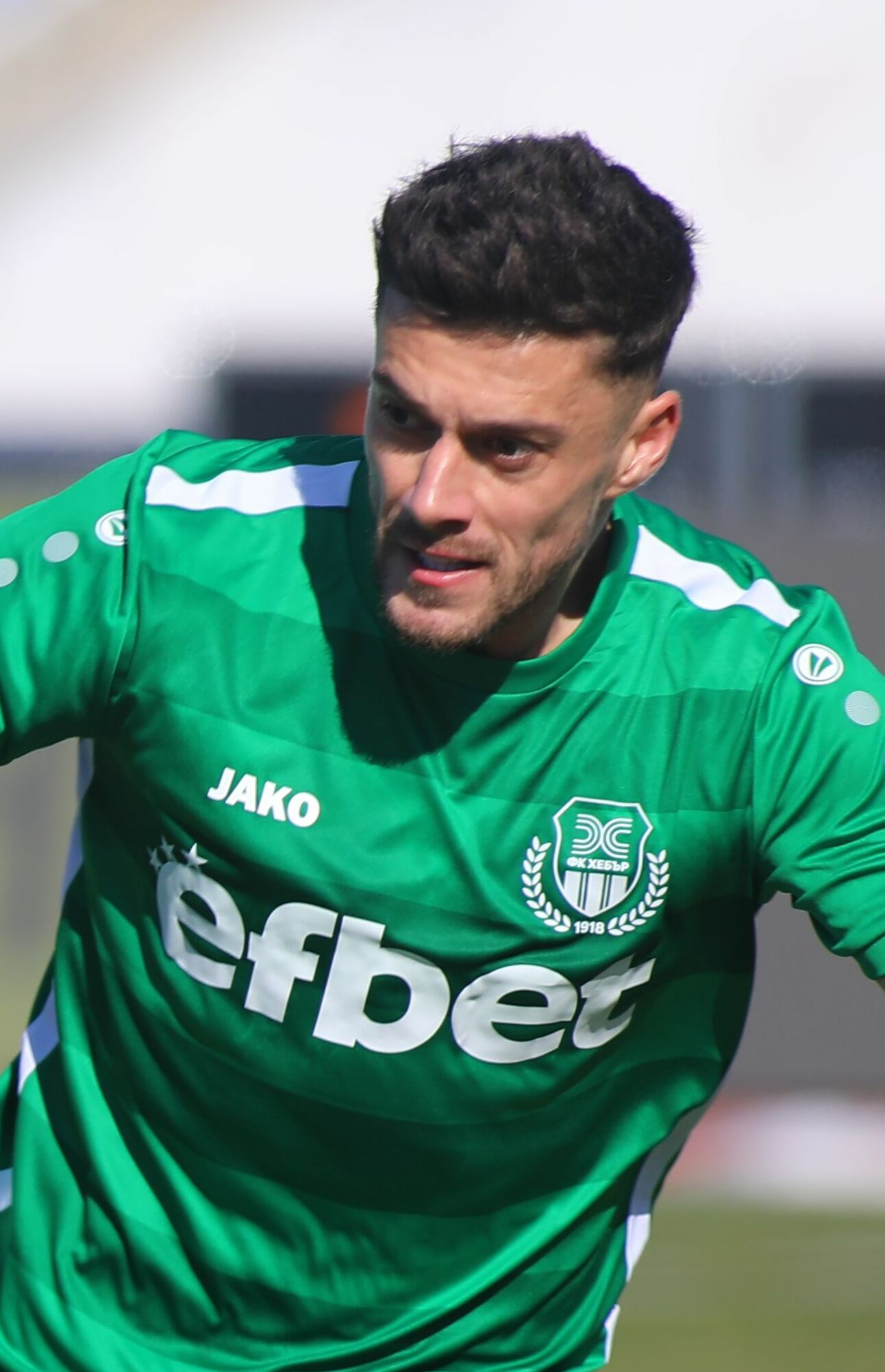
- Mazáň in 2023

Personal information
- Full name: Róbert Mazáň
- Date of birth: 9 February 1994 (age 32)
- Place of birth: Trenčín, Slovakia
- Height: 1.80 m (5 ft 11 in)
- Position: Left back

Team information
- Current team: Hebar Pazardzhik
- Number: 27

Youth career
- –2008: OFK Drietoma
- 2008–2013: AS Trenčín

Senior career*
Years	Team	Apps	(Gls)
2010–2013	AS Trenčín	57	(1)
2014	Senica	29	(0)
2015–2016	Podbeskidzie Bielsko-Biała	2	(0)
2015–2016	→ Žilina (loan)	17	(0)
2016–2018	Žilina	30	(1)
2018–2020	Celta Vigo	3	(0)
2019	→ Venezia (loan)	7	(0)
2019–2020	→ Tenerife (loan)	11	(1)
2020–2021	Mladá Boleslav	13	(0)
2021	Karviná	9	(0)
2021–2022	AEL Limassol	25	(0)
2022–2024	Hebar Pazardzhik	41	(1)
2024	Panevėžys	31	(0)
2025–	Hebar Pazardzhik	31	(1)

International career
- Slovakia U15
- Slovakia U16
2011	Slovakia U17	3	(0)
2011–2014	Slovakia U19	9	(0)
2013–2017	Slovakia U21	13	(0)
2017–2020	Slovakia	11	(0)
- * Club domestic league appearances and goals as of 17 November 2026

Róbert Mazáň (Slovak pronunciation: [ˈrɔːbert ˈmazaːɲ] born 9 February 1994) is a Slovak professional footballer who plays as a left-back for Hebar Pazardzhik.

== Club career ==
=== Early career in Slovakia ===
In November 2011, Mazáň made his Corgoň Liga debut in a 2–1 away loss against DAC Dunajská Streda. On 2 February 2014, Mazáň signed a new two-and-a-half-year contract that ran until 30 June 2016 with Senica.

=== Celta Vigo ===
Despite interest from Benfica and Atalanta, Mazáň joined Celta Vigo with his former teammate from AS Trenčín, Stanislav Lobotka. Mazáň had expressed that this is a huge moment in his career, remarking that while at Podbeskidzie, he felt unappreciated. He had also expressed an interest in getting a spot on Celta's first team.

His first game at Celta, in which he completed the entire 90 minutes, was against later 2018–19 La Liga champions FC Barcelona at Camp Nou on 22 December 2018. After the game, Barcelona's first goal, after the frequent Alba–Messi combination, was partly blamed on Mazáň.

==== Loan moves to Venezia and CD Tenerife ====
In late January 2019, it was announced that Mazáň would join Venezia on a half-season loan, to collect more play time. He made his Serie B debut against Livorno on 24 February 2019, playing 90 minutes of the 0–1 defeat. At the end of his, Mazáň had stated that he was prepared to return to Spain and fight for his position in the first team.

On 24 July 2019, Mazáň moved to Segunda División side CD Tenerife one-year loan.

=== Czech Republic ===
On 11 September 2020, Mazáň signed a new contract with Mladá Boleslav. He left Mladá Boleslav after 13 games in February 2021 after no longer being a part of plans of Karel Jarolím.

On 9 February 2021, his 27th birthday, Mazáň signed a half-season deal with Karviná, where he was desired by the manager Juraj Jarábek.

=== Hebar Pazardzhik ===
In September 2022, Mazáň joined newly promoted Bulgarian first division club Hebar Pazardzhik.

== International career ==
In October 2017, Mazáň debuted for the Slovak senior squad against Malta. With the arrival of Pavel Hapal to the national team, he lost his spot even in March 2019, despite his move to Venezia and higher playing time.

== Career statistics ==
As of match played 22 December 2018

Appearances and goals by club, season and competition
Club	Season	League			National Cup		European		Total	
Club	Season	Division	Apps	Goals	Apps	Goals	Apps	Goals	Apps	Goals
AS Trenčín	2011–12	Corgoň Liga	7	0	0	0	—		7	0
AS Trenčín	2012–13	Corgoň Liga	30	1	0	0	—		30	1
AS Trenčín	2013–14	Corgoň Liga	18	0	0	0	3 (Note: Appearances in the Europa League)	0	21	0
AS Trenčín	Trenčín total		55	1	0	0	3	0	58	1
Senica	2013–14	Corgoň Liga	11	0	2	0	0	0	13	0
Senica	2014–15	Fortuna Liga	18	0	1	0	—		19	0
Senica	Senica		29	0	3	0	0	0	32	0
Podbeskidzie	2014–15	Ekstraklasa	2	0	3	0	—		5	0
Žilina (loan)	2015–16	Fortuna Liga	17	0	4	0	1	0	22	0
Žilina II (loan)	2015–16	DOXXbet liga - West	3	0	—		—		3	0
Žilina	2016–17	Fortuna Liga	13	1	1	0	—		14	1
Žilina	2017–18	Fortuna Liga	17	0	1	0	2 (Note: Appearances in the Champions League)	0	20	0
Žilina	Žilina total		30	1	2	0	2	0	34	1
Žilina II	2016–17	DOXXbet liga - West	5	0	—		—		5	0
Celta Vigo	2017–18	La Liga	2	0	0	0	—		2	0
Celta Vigo	2018–19	La Liga	1	0	1	0	—		2	0
Celta Vigo	Celta Vigo total		3	0	1	0	0	0	4	0
Career total			142	2	10	0	6	0	158	2

== Honours ==
MŠK Žilina

- Fortuna Liga: 2016–17
