= Vladimír Koník =

Slovak football coach (born 1968)

Personal information
- Date of birth: 3 April 1968 (age 58)

Senior career*
Years	Team	Apps	(Gls)
- ŠKP Devín

Managerial career
- ŠKP Devín (youths)
- ŠKP Devín (assistant manager)
- Dunajská Streda
- Zlaté Moravce
- FK Slavoj Sládkovičovo
- FK Družstevník Báč
- Vráble
- Topoľčany
- Šaľa
- ŠKP Dúbravka
- 2007–2009: Inter Bratislava
- 2009: Trenčín
- 2011–2012: Šamorín
- 2013: Senica
- 2013: Nitra
- 2016: ŠK Slovan Bratislava (carateker)
- 2019–2020: FC Petržalka
- * Club domestic league appearances and goals

Vladimír Koník (born 3 April 1968) is a Slovak football coach and former player who most recently managed FC Petržalka. His former club was FK Senica.
