= Dojč =

- Municipality
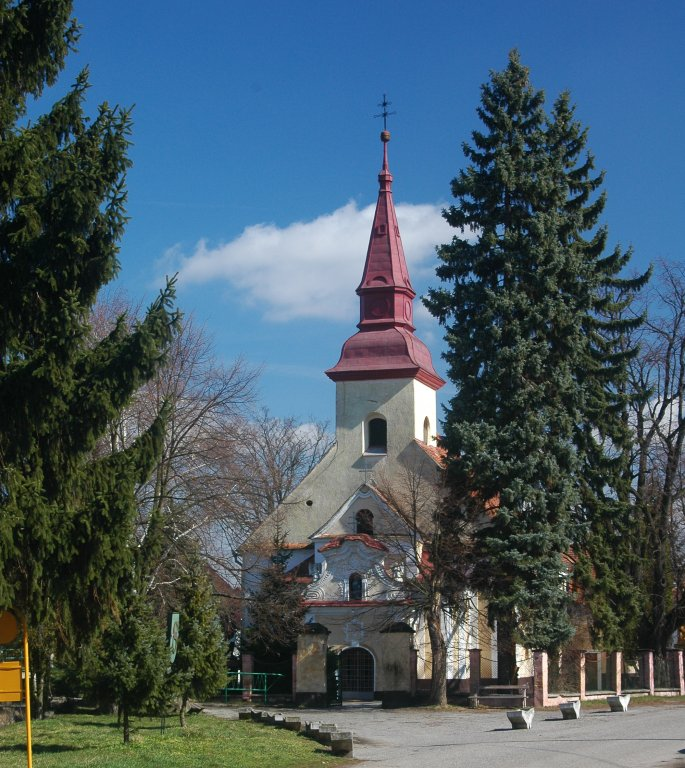

- Flag

- Location of Dojč in the Trnava Region Location of Dojč in Slovakia
- Coordinates: 48.67°N 17.27°E
- Country: Slovakia
- Region: Trnava Region
- District: Senica District
- First mentioned: 1392

Area
  - Total: 20.36 km^{2} (7.86 sq mi)
- Elevation: 182 m (597 ft)

Population (2025)
  - Total: 1,383
- Time zone: UTC+1 (CET)
  - Summer (DST): UTC+2 (CEST)
- Postal code: 906 02
- Area code: +421 34
- Vehicle registration plate (until 2022): SE
- Website: www.dojc.sk

Dojč (Hungarian: Dócs) is a village and municipality in Senica District in the Trnava Region of western Slovakia.

== Geography ==
The municipality lies at an altitude of 182 metres (597 ft) and covers an area of 20.36 km^{2} (7.86 sq mi) (2025).

The village is located in the Záhorie lowland, around 10 km west of Senica at an altitude of 180 metres.

== History ==
In historical records the village was first mentioned in 1392.

== Population ==
Population statistic (10 years)
Year	1995	2005	2015	2025
Count	1139	1257	1241	1383
Difference		+10.35%	−1.27%	+11.44%

Population statistic
Year	2024	2025
Count	1380	1383
Difference		+0.21%

It has a population of 1383 people (31 December 2025).

=== Ethnicity ===
Census 2021 (1+ %)
Ethnicity	Number	Fraction
Slovak	1238	97.55%
Not found out	25	1.97%
Czech	16	1.26%
Total	1269	

In year 2021 was 1269 people by ethnicity 1238 as Slovak, 25 as Not found out, 16 as Czech, 4 as Other, 3 as Romani, 1 as Russian and 1 as Moravian.

Note on population: The difference values of population numbers in the table "Population statistic" and in the sections "Ethnicity" & "Religion" is caused by the use of various statistical methods.

=== Religion ===
Census 2021 (1+ %)
Religion	Number	Fraction
Roman Catholic Church	883	69.58%
None	258	20.33%
Evangelical Church	46	3.62%
Not found out	43	3.39%
Total	1269	

In year 2021 was 1269 people by religion 883 from Roman Catholic Church, 258 from None, 46 from Evangelical Church, 43 from Not found out, 11 from Christian Congregations in Slovakia, 7 from Other, 7 from Apostolic Church, 3 from Greek Catholic Church, 3 from Ad hoc movements, 2 from Old Catholic Church, 2 from Buddhism, 1 from Calvinist Church, 1 from Eastern Orthodox Church, 1 from Jehovah's Witnesses and 1 from Seventh-day Adventist Church.

== Genealogical resources ==
The records for genealogical research are available at the state archive "Statny Archiv in Bratislava, Slovakia"

- Roman Catholic church records (births/marriages/deaths): 1668-1895 (parish A)
- Lutheran church records (births/marriages/deaths): 1835-1875 (parish B)

== See also ==
- List of municipalities and towns in Slovakia
