= Jaroslav Diviš =

Czech footballer

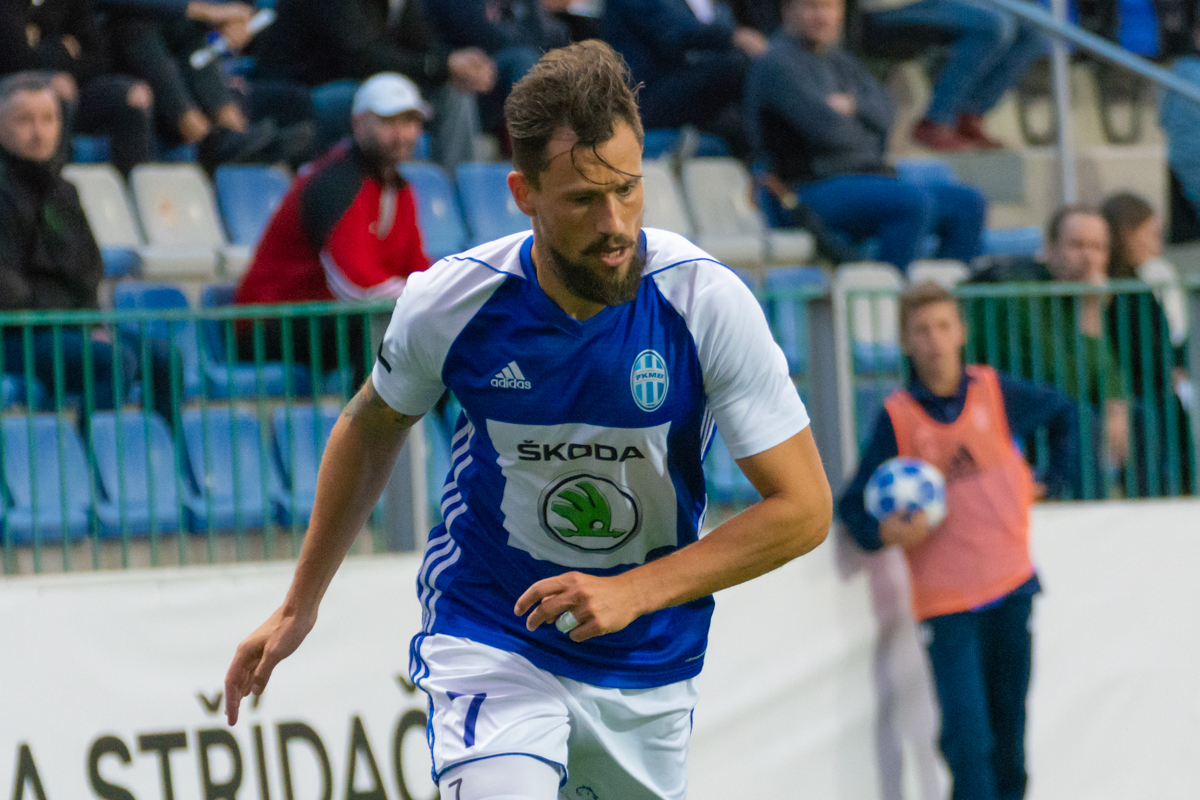

Personal information
- Full name: Jaroslav Diviš
- Date of birth: 9 July 1986 (age 40)
- Place of birth: Hustopeče, Czechoslovakia
- Height: 1.80 m (5 ft 11 in)
- Position: Winger

Team information
- Current team: Viktoria Žižkov
- Number: 7

Youth career
- Slovácko

Senior career*
Years	Team	Apps	(Gls)
2007	Slovácko	1	(0)
2007–2009	Vítkovice	29	(10)
2009–2010	Slovan Liberec	11	(0)
2010–2013	Senica	108	(23)
2014–2017	Slovácko	84	(18)
2017–2018	Jablonec	24	(1)
2018–2019	Mladá Boleslav	12	(0)
2019	→ Slovácko (loan)	13	(1)
2019–	Viktoria Žižkov	14	(4)
- * Club domestic league appearances and goals as of 19:03, 7 December 2019 (UTC)

Jaroslav Diviš (born 9 July 1986) is a Czech football midfielder who plays for FK Viktoria Žižkov.

== Career ==
Diviš began his career at the Czech second division team FC Vítkovice, for whom he scored 10 goals. In July 2009 Diviš signed a two-year contract with the Czech premier league side Slovan Liberec. On season 2010/2011 he was loaned out to Senica in Slovak Corgoň Liga. In July 2011, he joined Slovak club FK Senica on a three-year contract.
