= Milan Jirásek =

Czech footballer

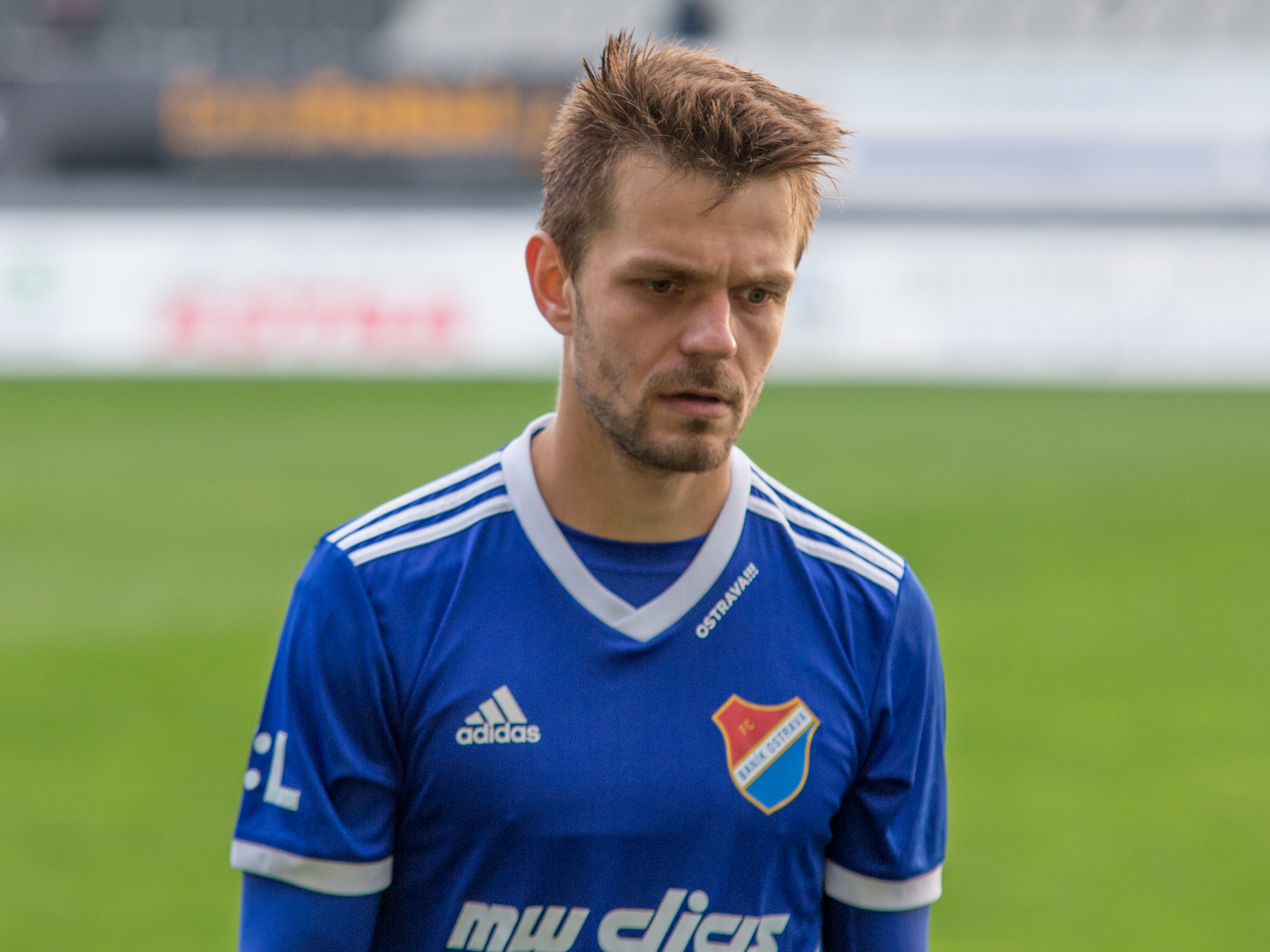

Personal information
- Full name: Milan Jirásek
- Date of birth: 14 February 1992 (age 34)
- Place of birth: Chrudim, Czechoslovakia
- Height: 1.76 m (5 ft 9 in)
- Position: Midfielder

Team information
- Current team: Viktoria Žižkov
- Number: 8

Youth career
- Sparta Prague
- Inter Milan

Senior career*
Years	Team	Apps	(Gls)
2010–2011	Inter Milan	0	(0)
2010	→ Sassuolo (loan)	2	(0)
2011–2015	Sparta Prague	2	(0)
2013–2014	→ Senica (loan)	46	(3)
2014	→ Teplice (loan)	5	(0)
2015	→ Baník Ostrava (loan)	10	(0)
2015–2017	Bohemians 1905	54	(3)
2017–2020	Baník Ostrava	70	(4)
2021–2022	Mladá Boleslav	1	(0)
2022–	Viktoria Žižkov	102	(13)

International career^{‡}
2008–2009	Czech Republic U17	6	(0)
2009	Czech Republic U18	?	(?)
2011	Czech Republic U19	5	(1)
2013–2014	Czech Republic U21	4	(0)
- * Club domestic league appearances and goals as of 28 May 2026 ‡ National team caps and goals as of 11 February 2014

Milan Jirásek (born 14 February 1992) is a Czech footballer who plays as a midfielder for Viktoria Žižkov.

== Club career ==
=== Early career ===
Born in Chrudim, part of historic Bohemia, Jirásek started his career at Sparta Prague. In July 2008 he was signed by Italian football club F.C. Internazionale Milano. He was the member of Allievi Nazionali under-17 team in the first season. In the next season he was promoted to the senior youth team – the Primavera under-20 team but only played 4 times in the league. In January 2010 he was loaned to Sassuolo. Jirásek played 11 out of possible 11 matches for its Primavera (literally "spring"), with 10 starts. (He was as sub against Grosseto). That season the team composed with former Inter youth products, such as Mame Baba Thiam (forward) and Alberto Gallinetta (goalkeeper), who also returned to Inter. He was the midfielder of the team, or as a wing forward in his first appearance. In 2010–11 season Jirásek returned to Inter "spring" and made 20 appearances, 13 of them as starter. The team also stick to the internal policy of changing the team to U-19 team with a few U20 player. (3 in 2010–11 season) He shared the starting role with Andrea Romanò, or even played as an emergency left back or right wing forward. The two other solid member of the midfielder were Lorenzo Crisetig and Sebastian Carlsén. He won 2011 Torneo di Viareggio with Inter. Jirásek was the starting midfielder in the play-off round, with the second round Fulvio Pea changed to use 4–4–2 formation.

Jirásek also made his Serie B debut in 2009–10 Serie B, in the last round. He substituted Giorgio Schiavini in the second half. That match Sassuolo 0–0 draw with the champion Lecce. Coach Stefano Pioli also brought Jirásek to the playoffs. Jirásek wore no.5 shirt that season, which vacated by Sebastiano Girelli.

=== Return to Sparta Prague ===
In July 2011 Jirásek returned to Sparta Prague on a three-year contract. He was a player for Sparta Prague B (Reserve team). On 3 November he made his first appearance in the A-team, replacing injured Václav Kadlec in the 8th minute.

=== Loans to Senica and Teplice ===
In January 2013, he was sent by Sparta Prague on a one-year loan to Senica. In July 2014, he was sent by Sparta Prague on a one-year loan to FK Teplice.

== International career ==
Jirásek was a member of Czech U17 squad at 2009 UEFA European Under-17 Football Championship qualification and in the elite round. He received call-up from U-18 team in September 2009. He also played for U19 in double friendly against Italy.
