= Juraj Križko =

Slovak footballer

Personal information
- Full name: Juraj Križko
- Date of birth: 20 September 1985 (age 41)
- Place of birth: Ilava, Czechoslovakia
- Height: 1.90 m (6 ft 3 in)
- Position: Centre back

Team information
- Current team: Trenčianske Stankovce

Youth career
- 1991–2002: TTS Trenčín

Senior career*
Years	Team	Apps	(Gls)
2002–2003	Matador Púchov	0	(0)
2004–2005	AS Trenčín	1	(0)
2005–2006	Spartak Bánovce nad Bebravou	?	(?)
2006–2007	Trenčianske Stankovce	?	(?)
2007–2009	AS Trenčín	50	(8)
2009–2010	Brno	20	(1)
2010	→ Senica (loan)	10	(0)
2011–2013	Senica	53	(1)
2014–2015	Hradec Králové	25	(1)
2016–2017	Nitra	21	(2)
2017	Iskra Borčice	?	(?)
2017–	Trenčianske Stankovce	?	(?)
- * Club domestic league appearances and goals as of 1 February 2020

Juraj Križko (born 20 September 1985) is a Slovak football defender who plays amateur football for Trenčianske Stankovce.
