= Lukáš Opiela =

Slovak footballer

Personal information
- Full name: Lukáš Opiela
- Date of birth: 13 January 1986 (age 40)
- Place of birth: Humenné, Czechoslovakia
- Height: 1.69 m (5 ft 7 in)
- Position: Defensive midfielder

Team information
- Current team: Skalica
- Number: 42

Youth career
- Humenné

Senior career*
Years	Team	Apps	(Gls)
2005–2007	Tescoma Zlín	53	(1)
2008–2013	Mladá Boleslav	79	(3)
2013–2015	Senica	43	(2)
2015–2016	Robur Siena	21	(0)
2017–2020	Skalica	71	(5)

International career
2007	Slovakia U21		
- * Club domestic league appearances and goals as of 7 January 2020

Lukáš Opiela (born 13 January 1986) is a Slovak professional footballer who plays as a defensive midfielder for Skalica. Outside of Slovakia, he worked at the club level in the Czech Republic and Italy.
