= Kosořín =

- Municipality
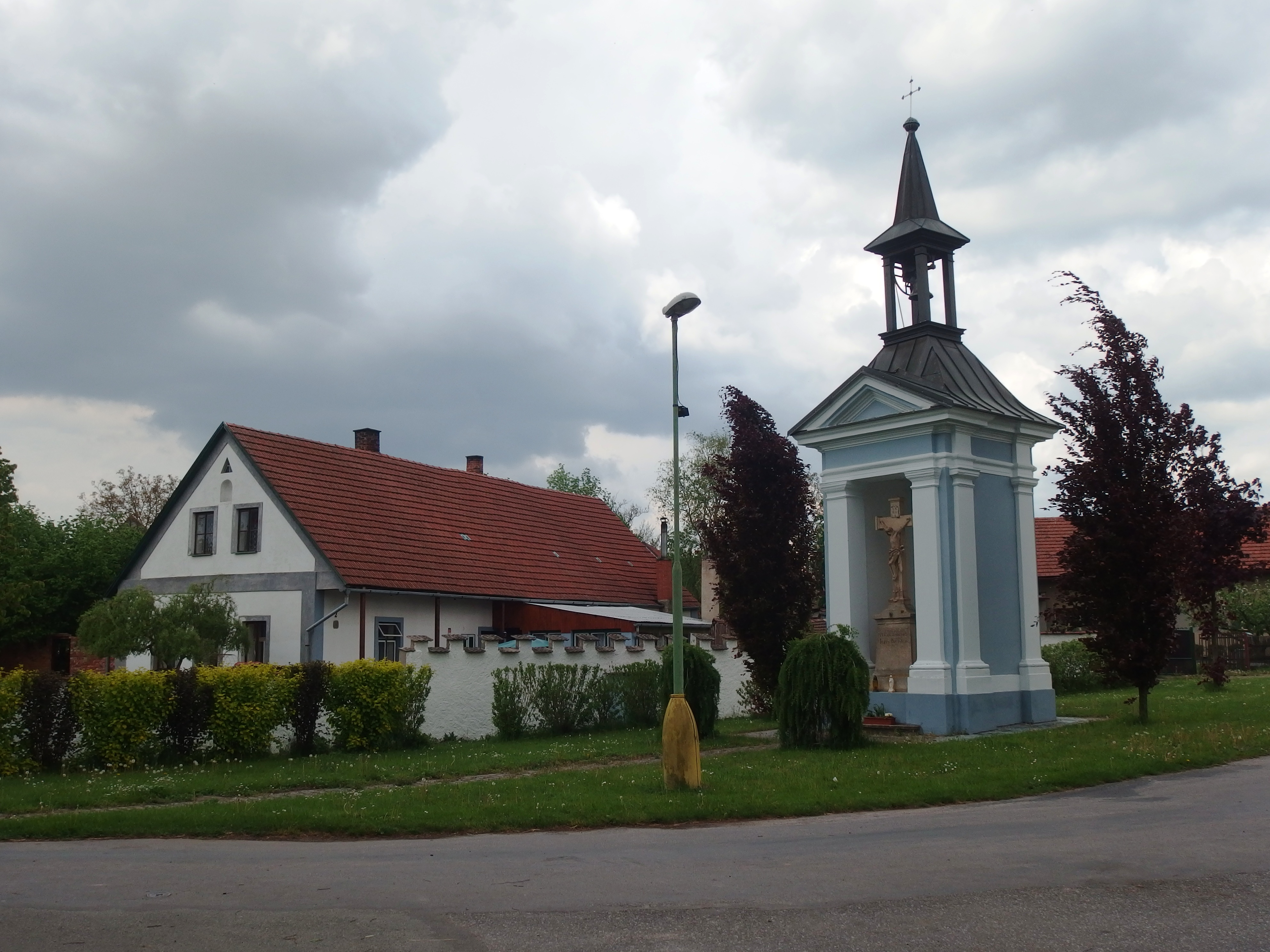
- Chapel in the centre of Kosořín

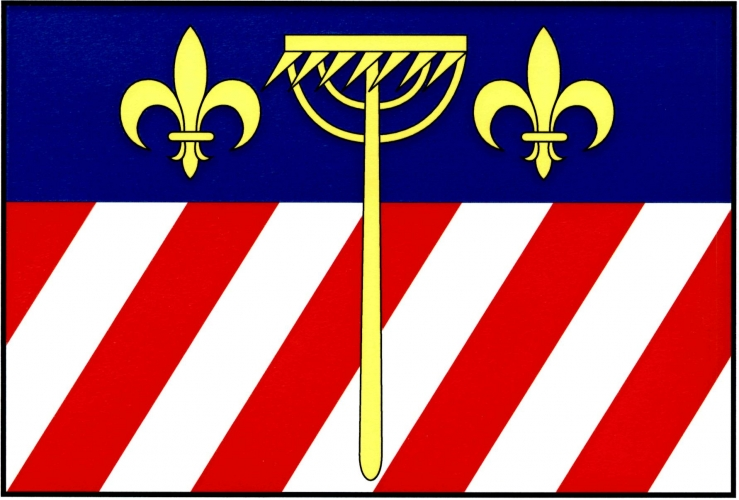
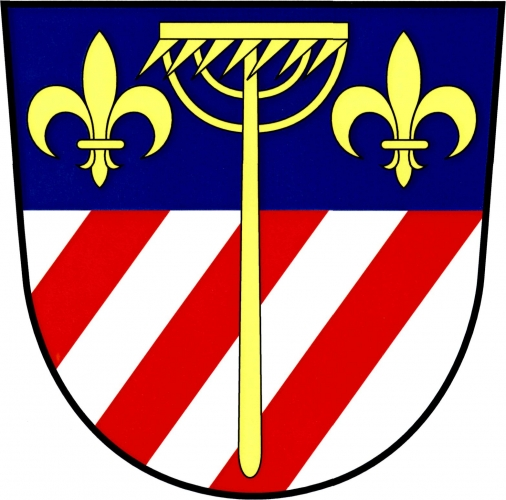
- Flag Coat of arms

- Location in the Czech Republic
- Coordinates: 49°58′45″N 16°14′2″E
- Country: Czech Republic
- Region: Pardubice
- District: Ústí nad Orlicí
- First mentioned: 1292

Area
  - Total: 1.75 km^{2} (0.68 sq mi)
- Elevation: 317 m (1,040 ft)

Population (2026-01-01)
  - Total: 200
  - Density: 110/km^{2} (300/sq mi)
- Time zone: UTC+1 (CET)
  - Summer (DST): UTC+2 (CEST)
- Postal code: 565 01
- Website: kosorin.cz

Kosořín (German: Kosarin) is a municipality and village in Ústí nad Orlicí District in the Pardubice Region of the Czech Republic. It has about 200 inhabitants.

Kosořín lies approximately 12 kilometres (7 mi) west of Ústí nad Orlicí, 34 km (21 mi) east of Pardubice, and 131 km (81 mi) east of Prague.

== Demographics ==
Historical population
Year	Pop.	±%
1869	170	—
1880	160	−5.9%
1890	180	+12.5%
1900	178	−1.1%
1910	202	+13.5%
1921	178	−11.9%
1930	213	+19.7%
1950	143	−32.9%
1961	130	−9.1%
1970	126	−3.1%
1980	123	−2.4%
1991	114	−7.3%
2001	122	+7.0%
2011	145	+18.9%
2021	171	+17.9%
Source: Censuses
