= Juraj Piroska =

Slovak footballer

Personal information
- Date of birth: 27 February 1987 (age 39)
- Place of birth: Bratislava, Czechoslovakia
- Height: 1.79 m (5 ft 10 in)
- Positions: Attacking midfielder; forward

Team information
- Current team: FK Inter Bratislava
- Number: 33

Youth career
- 1993–2004: Slovan Bratislava
- 2004–2005: Freiburg

Senior career*
Years	Team	Apps	(Gls)
2005	AS Trenčín	3	(0)
2006–2008	Petržalka	43	(6)
2006	→ SFM Senec (loan)		
2009	Sparta Prague	1	(0)
2009–2014	Senica	139	(42)
2012	→ Slovan Bratislava (loan)	12	(1)
2015	Kaisar	5	(0)
2015	Spartak Myjava	9	(1)
2016	Skalica	8	(1)
2016	Petržalka	4	(2)
2017	Vibonese	7	(1)
2017–2020	Petržalka	54	(13)
2020–2022	Senica	44	(6)
2022–2023	Petržalka	15	(2)
2023–	Inter Bratislava	88	(17)

International career^{‡}
2005–2006	Slovakia U19	?	(?)
2007–2008	Slovakia U21	7	(2)
2011	Slovakia	3	(1)

Managerial career
- 2019–2020: Petržalka (assistant)
- 2020: Senica (assistant)
- 2022–2023: Petržalka (assistant)
- 2023-: Inter Bratislava (assistant)
- * Club domestic league appearances and goals as of 25 May 2026 ‡ National team caps and goals as of 11 October 2011

Juraj Piroska (born 27 February 1987) is a Slovak professional footballer who plays as a midfielder for Inter Bratislava.

== Club career ==
Piroska began playing football in Slovan Bratislava at the age of 6. He joined German side SC Freiburg youth squad in 2004. There he spent one-and-a-half years and came back to Slovakia, signing for AS Trenčín. He missed most of the time in Trenčín due to a backbone injury.

In January 2006, he moved to Artmedia Petržalka. His breakthrough came in 2007–08, winning the double.

On 16 February 2009, he signed a three-year contract for Sparta Prague. He played only 16 minutes for Sparta in the Gambrinus liga and moved on loan to Senica in July 2009.

His good form in Senica switched to transfer in June 2010. He scored his first hat-trick in a 5–0 away win against Nitra on 4 March 2011.

== International career ==
Piroska made his debut for the Slovakia national team in a 1–0 away win against Andorra on 26 March 2011. He netted his first goal on 11 October 2011 in a 1–1 away draw with Macedonia in a Euro 2012 qualifier.

== Affiliated activities ==
Piroska appears in RTVS, Slovak public broadcaster, during televised national team or club international fixtures as well as major tournaments, like UEFA Euro 2020, as an expert analyst and panel member.

== Career statistics ==
Score and result list Slovakia's goal tally first, score column indicates score after Piroska goal.

International goal scored by Juraj Piroska
No.	Date	Venue	Opponent	Score	Result	Competition
1	11 October 2011	Philip II Arena, Skopje, Macedonia	Macedonia	1–0	1–1	Euro 2012 qualifier

== Honours ==
Artmedia

- Corgoň Liga: 2007–08
- Slovak Cup: 2007–08
