= Petr Pavlík (footballer, born 1987) =

Czech footballer

Personal information
- Full name: Petr Pavlík
- Date of birth: 22 July 1987 (age 39)
- Place of birth: Opava, Czechoslovakia
- Height: 1.89 m (6 ft 2 in)
- Position: Centre back

Youth career
- Baník Ostrava

Senior career*
Years	Team	Apps	(Gls)
2005–2009	Baník Ostrava	15	(0)
2007	→ Vítkovice (loan)	?	(?)
2009	Kasımpaşa	3	(0)
2010	Samsunspor	10	(0)
2010–2011	Karviná	7	(1)
2011	→ Hlučín (loan)	11	(0)
2011–2016	Senica	144	(8)
2016	Spartak Myjava	19	(0)
2017–2019	Zbrojovka Brno	64	(2)
2020	→ Pohronie (loan)	8	(2)
2020–2021	Pohronie	27	(1)
2021–2022	Senica	26	(2)
2022	Sokol Lanžhot	?	(?)

International career^{‡}
2002–2003	Czech Republic U16	9	(0)
2003–2004	Czech Republic U17	15	(1)
2004–2005	Czech Republic U18	9	(1)
2005–2006	Czech Republic U19	16	(1)
2006	Czech Republic U20	1	(0)
- * Club domestic league appearances and goals as of 20:15, 6 February 2024 (UTC) ‡ National team caps and goals as of 6 January 2017

Petr Pavlík (born 22 July 1987) is a Czech professional football who plays as a centre back.

== Career ==
=== Pohronie ===
Pavlík's signing with Pohronie was announced on in January 2020. His transfer was requested by his former coach Mikuláš Radványi, with whom he had a spell with Spartak Myjava. He arrived on a half-season loan from Zbrojovka Brno. Pavlík was featured frequently in winter preparatory friendly games. He made his competitive debut for Pohronie in Fortuna Liga on 15 February 2020 in a match against Nitra at pod Zoborom. Pavlík completed 90 minutes of the match. This was a match that was dubbed as a six-point match, as both teams were just one point apart, in the relegation zone, with Nitra in 11th and Pohronie in 12th place.

== Personal life ==
Pavlík resides with his family in Senica, Slovakia.
