= Erich Brabec =

Czech footballer (born 1977)

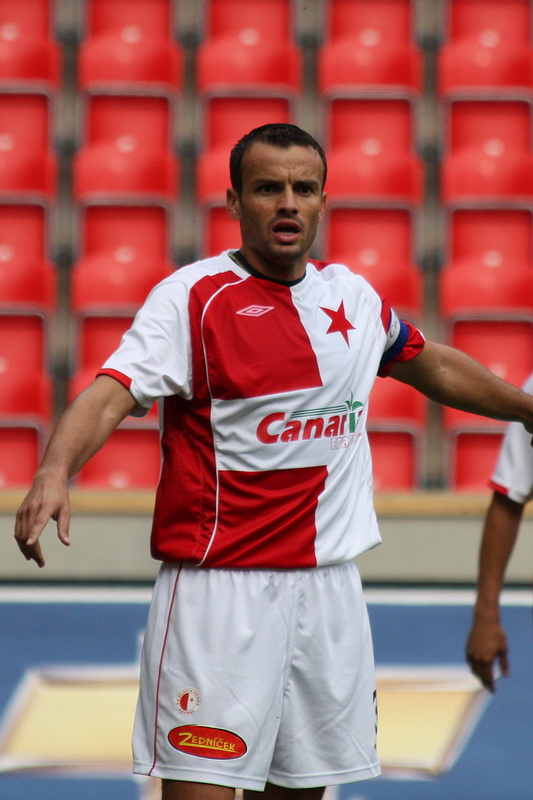
- Brabec with Slavia Prague

Personal information
- Date of birth: 24 February 1977 (age 49)
- Place of birth: České Budějovice, Czechoslovakia
- Height: 1.90 m (6 ft 3 in)
- Position: Centre back

Youth career
- České Budějovice

Senior career*
| Years | Team | Apps | (Gls) |
| 1994–1998 | Dynamo České Budějovice | 50 | (1) |
| 1996 | → Chrudim (loan) | 1 | (0) |
| 1998 | → Tatran Poštorná (loan) | 9 | (1) |
| 1999–2001 | Drnovice | 67 | (2) |
| 2002–2003 | Dynamo Moscow | 28 | (0) |
| 2003–2004 | Alania Vladikavkaz | 28 | (1) |
| 2005 | Kayserispor | 17 | (0) |
| 2005–2006 | Pasching | 16 | (0) |
| 2006–2007 | Aarau | 28 | (0) |
| 2007–2009 | Slavia Prague | 53 | (1) |
| 2009 | Ankaraspor | 4 | (1) |
| 2009–2010 | Ankaragücü | 3 | (0) |
| 2010–2012 | Sparta Prague | 57 | (0) |
| 2012–2014 | Senica | 48 | (0) |
| 2014 | Bohemians 1905 | 25 | (1) |
| 2015 | Slovan Liberec | 6 | (0) |
| Total | | 440 | (8) |

International career
| 1997 | Czech Republic U20 | 6 | (0) |
| 1998–2000 | Czech Republic U21 | 15 | (0) |
| 2000–2009 | Czech Republic | 2 | (0) |

Managerial career
- 2017–2018: Sparta Prague (U-19)
- 2018–2019: Sellier & Bellot Vlašim
- 2019–2021: Bohemians 1905 (assistant)
- * Club domestic league appearances and goals

Erich Brabec (born 24 February 1977) is a Czech football manager and former player. Since March 2023 Brabec is chair of the Czech Women's Football section FAČR.

== Club career ==
Brabec started his Czech First League career with České Budějovice where he played between 1994 and 1998. Brabec joined Dynamo Moscow in 2002, after receiving an offer on 18 December 2001. He left for Alania Vladikavkaz in July 2003. He joined Slavia Prague in 2007, subsequently becoming club captain.

== International career ==
Brabec made his debut for the Czech Republic national team against Mexico on 8 February 2000 in the 2000 Lunar New Year Cup.

== Coaching career ==
On 11 October 2019, Brabec was appointed assistant manager of Luděk Klusáček at Bohemians 1905.
