= Tomáš Kóňa =

Slovak footballer

Personal information
- Full name: Tomáš Kóňa
- Date of birth: 1 March 1984 (age 42)
- Place of birth: Nitra, Czechoslovakia
- Height: 1.78 m (5 ft 10 in)
- Position: Midfielder

Team information
- Current team: Spartak Myjava

Youth career
- 1990–2003: Nitra

Senior career*
Years	Team	Apps	(Gls)
2003–2005	Nitra	78	(11)
2006–2011	Sparta Prague	11	(0)
2008	→ Tescoma Zlín (loan)	8	(0)
2009	→ Petržalka 1898 (loan)	14	(1)
2009–2010	→ Nitra (loan)	31	(4)
2010–2011	→ Senica (loan)	32	(4)
2011–2015	Senica	101	(9)
2015–2016	Spartak Myjava	51	(6)
2017	Slovan Bratislava	13	(1)
2017–2019	Nitra	57	(8)
2019–2022	Spartak Myjava	?	(7)

International career^{‡}
2011–2013	Slovakia	5	(0)
- * Club domestic league appearances and goals as of 19 June 2022 ‡ National team caps and goals as of 16 June 2013

Tomáš Kóňa (born 1 March 1984) is a Slovak football midfielder who currently plays for Spartak Myjava.

== Club career ==
Kóňa, a native of Nitra, began playing football at the local club FC Nitra. He made his debut for the senior team in the 2003–04 Second Division season. After Nitra's promotion to the Corgoň Liga in 2005, he took part in every match until his transfer to Sparta Praha in January 2006.

He made his debut for Sparta against Příbram on 19 August 2006. He played 10 matches in 2006–07 and only one match in 2007–08 due to fracture of his leg. After his treatment he moved to Zlín on a half-year loan in July 2008.

In February 2009, he moved on half-year loan to Artmedia Petržalka. He appeared in 14 league matches and scored one goal. He played in the 2008–09 Slovak Cup Final where they lost against Košice.

In July 2009, he came back to Nitra on a one-year loan and helped them to qualify at the 2010–11 UEFA Europa League, scoring 4 goals in 30 matches.

In July 2010, he moved to Senica on a one-year loan. He showed good performance for Senica that finished second in 2010–11 and he has signed a 2-year contract in July 2011.

== International career ==
Kóňa made his national team debut in a 1–0 away win against Andorra on 26 March 2011.

== Honours ==
=== Sparta Praha ===
- Gambrinus liga (1): 2006–07
- Czech Cup (2): 2006–07, 2007–08
