= Martin Ďurica =

Slovak footballer

Personal information
- Full name: Martin Ďurica
- Date of birth: 11 July 1981 (age 45)
- Place of birth: Žilina, Czechoslovakia
- Height: 1.84 m (6 ft 0 in)
- Position: Midfielder

Senior career*
Years	Team	Apps	(Gls)
1999–2005	MŠK Žilina	112	(12)
2005–2006	FC Chiasso	12	(3)
2006–2008	Artmedia Petržalka	35	(6)
2008	MŠK Žilina	21	(2)
2009	Ahva Arraba	9	(1)
2010–2013	FK Senica	51	(3)

International career
2003–2004	Slovakia	5	(1)
- * Club domestic league appearances and goals as of 20 April 2013

Martin Ďurica (born 11 July 1981 in Žilina) is a Slovak football midfielder currently playing for FK Senica, who has represented the Slovakia national team playing in the qualifiers for Euro 2004.

At club level, Ďurica played for MŠK Žilina, FC Chiasso and Artmedia Petržalka.
