= Jakub Kosorin =

Slovak footballer

Personal information
- Full name: Jakub Kosorin
- Date of birth: 27 April 1995 (age 31)
- Place of birth: Senica, Slovakia
- Height: 1.81 m (5 ft 11 in)
- Position: Forward

Team information
- Current team: Sokol Lanžhot
- Number: 10

Youth career
- 2003–2007: TJ Baník Brodské
- 2008–2014: Senica

Senior career*
Years	Team	Apps	(Gls)
2013–2016	Senica	71	(5)
2017	Dunajská Streda B	14	(1)
2018	Pohronie	11	(2)
2018	Hodonín	6	(0)
2019	Petržalka	20	(0)
2020–2021	Hodonín	9	(4)
2021	Sokol Lanžhot	8	(6)
2022	Hodonín	7	(2)
2022	Sokol Lanžhot	9	(6)
2023–	SV Karlstetten/Neidling	25	(11)
- * Club domestic league appearances and goals as of 13:16, 10 January 2024 (UTC)

Jakub Kosorin (born 27 April 1995) is a Slovak football forward.

== Club career ==
Kosorin played his first match for Senica on 26 May 2013 against Nitra.

Ahead of the 2021-22 season, Kosorin joined Sokol Lanžhot.
