= Pavel Čermák =

Czech footballer (born 1989)

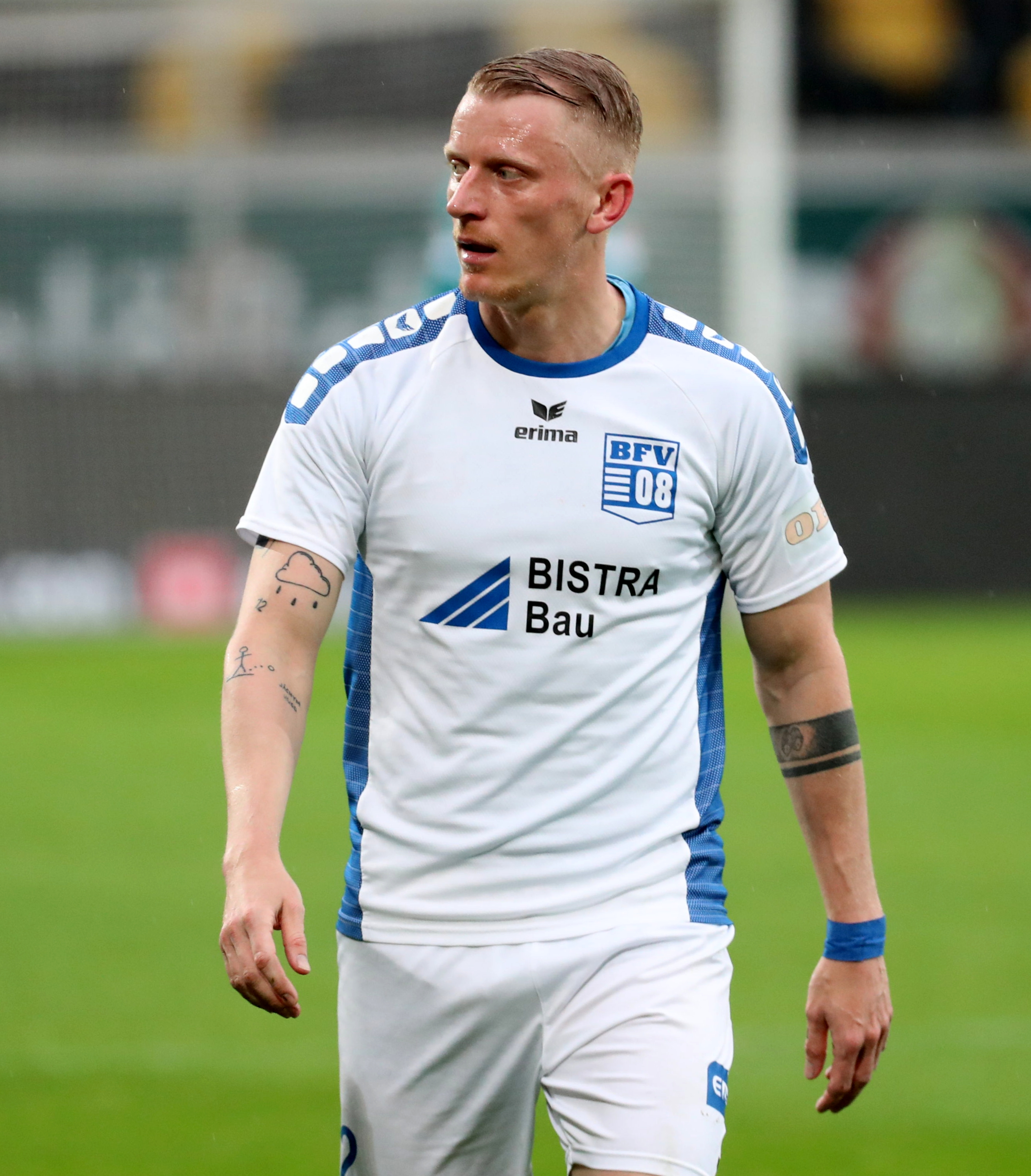

Personal information
- Full name: Pavel Čermák
- Date of birth: 14 May 1989 (age 37)
- Place of birth: Czechoslovakia
- Height: 1.76 m (5 ft 9 in)
- Position: Left back

Youth career
- 1998–2004: Baník Most
- 2004–2007: Teplice

Senior career*
Years	Team	Apps	(Gls)
2007–2008	Baník Most	7	(0)
2008–2013	Viktoria Žižkov	66	(4)
2010	→ Příbram (loan)	0	(0)
2013–2015	Senica	16	(0)
2014	→ Hradec Králové (loan)	16	(1)
- * Club domestic league appearances and goals as of 6 June 2015

Pavel Čermák (born 14 May 1989) is a professional Czech football player.
