= Jan Kalabiška =

Czech footballer

Personal information
- Full name: Jan Kalabiška
- Date of birth: 22 December 1986 (age 39)
- Place of birth: Mělník, Czechoslovakia
- Height: 1.88 m (6 ft 2 in)
- Position: Left-back

Team information
- Current team: Hodonín

Youth career
- Spolana Neratovice

Senior career*
Years	Team	Apps	(Gls)
2005–2007	Libiš		
2007–2009	Příbram	24	(1)
2009	→ Vlašim (loan)	15	(7)
2010–2011	Brno	42	(6)
2011–2016	Senica	134	(32)
2016–2017	Mladá Boleslav	23	(1)
2017	→ Karviná (loan)	12	(2)
2017–2018	Karviná	30	(5)
2018–2024	Slovácko	177	(21)
2024–2025	Pardubice	13	(2)
2025–2026	Zlín	22	(1)
2026–	Hodonín	0	(0)
- * Club domestic league appearances and goals as of 27 May 2026

Jan Kalabiška (born 22 December 1986) is a Czech footballer who plays for Hodonín as a winger.
