= Eduard Pagáč =

Slovak footballer and manager

Personal information
- Date of birth: 1 May 1978 (age 48)
- Place of birth: Czechoslovakia

Youth career
- Years: Team
- Dubnica

Managerial career
- 2002–2004: Dubnica (youth)
- 2004–2008: Púchov (youth)
- 2008–2012: Trenčín (youth)
- 2012–2013: Senica (youth)
- 2013–2014: Senica
- 2015: Senica
- 2018-2019: MŠK Púchov
- 2020: Senica
- 2021-2022: Nové Mesto n. Váhom
- 2022-2023: ŠKF Sereď
- 2023-2024: FC Slovan Galanta
- 2025-: FC Nitra (youth)

Eduard Pagáč (born 1 May 1978) is a Slovak football manager and former player who manages ŠKF Sereď.

== Career ==
At the age of 16, Pagáč had to stop his playing career due to health problems. In summer 2013, he was appointed as a head coach of the first team of FK Senica.
