= FK Senica =

Slovak association football team

- Full name: Futbalový klub Senica a.s.
- Nickname: Záhoráci
- Founded: 1921; 105 years ago
- Ground: OMS Arena, Senica
- Capacity: 5,070
- Owner: Komplexx Group Sports
- Manager: Libor Fašiang
- League: 6. liga Západ (VI)
- 2024–25: 7. liga Senica (VII), 1st of 12
- Website: www.fksenica.eu
Home colours	Away colours

FK Senica (Slovak pronunciation: [ˈseɲitsa]) is a Slovak football team, based in the town of Senica. The club was founded in 1921. The club played in the Slovak First Football League, before being declared bankrupt in May 2022. The team currently plays in the 6th tier of Slovak football.

== History ==
The football club in the town was founded in 1921. The newly formed team progressed quickly, but the football boom was dampened by the Second World War. Rudolf Pšurný, the club's chairman in the interwar period, kept the sporting community alive by organising matches and tournaments. After the war, football flourished again in the region.

The year 1962 was a milestone in the club's history, as the new stadium was opened in Senica. It serves the town's footballing community to this day. Its opening was marked by a benefit match between players from the Senica District and the squad that has recently won silver medals at the World Cup in Chile, led by Jozef Adamec.

Before the 2009–10 season, the club bought a licence from FK Inter Bratislava, a winner of the Slovak First League that were to advance to the Superliga. FK Senica thus appeared in the top flight for the first time ever. It quickly established itself as a competitive team, finishing second in 2010–11 and 2012–13 seasons and qualifying for the UEFA Europa League qualifying rounds three times in a row.

On 16 February 2019, Matchday 19 of the 2018–19 season, in an away game against AS Trenčín, played in Myjava, Senica fielded an entire starting line-up made up entirely of foreign players as the first team in Slovak history. All the substitutes were foreigners as well.

After the 2021–22 season, the club went bankrupt. According to sport.sk, it had debts of up to €1,000,000. This serious financial problem even made it impossible for Senica to pay the operating arrears that were listed on the club's official website before the COVID-19 pandemic. Even the official website, fksenica.eu, was deactivated because the club had not paid operating bills since February 2020.

The club's financial crisis has also reportedly caused the players and staff to not receive their salaries since September 2021. The stagnation of salaries over seven months led to a wave of massive resignations by several players. This caused Senica to be relegated to the 3rd league, as their licence was revoked.

In 2022, the club was refounded and its senior team currently plays in the 6th tier of Slovak football.

=== Clubname history ===
- 1921 – 1923 – Železná únia Senica
- 1923 – 1928 – Športový klub Senica
- 1928 – 1934 – AC Senica
- 1934 – 1939 – FC Senica
- 1940 – 1946 – ŠK Senica
- 1946 – 1969 – Sokol Chemické závody (ChZ)
- 1969 – 2006 – TJ/FK SH Senica (merged with FK 96 Ress Častkov)
- 2006 – present – FK Senica

== Honours ==
=== Domestic ===
- Slovak First Football League (1993–)
  - Runners-up (2): 2010–11, 2012–13
- Slovak Cup (1961–)
  - Runners-up (2): 2012, 2015

==== Slovak League Top Goalscorer ====
Slovak First Football League Top scorer since 1993–94

Year	Winner	G
2014–15	(Czech Republic) Jan Kalabiška	19^{1}

^{1}Shared award

== Supporters ==
Local ultras group is known as the Iron Union 1921 (Slovak: Železná únia 1921). During the matches, they are grouped in the Sector B3 at the stadium. The fan club was founded in the winter of 2013. They have good relations with fans of 1. FC Slovácko, a Czech-based club playing in the Czech First League.

=== Rivalries ===
FK Senica's biggest rival is Spartak Myjava. The matches between the two teams are referred to as the Záhorie-Kopanice Derby (Slovak: záhorácko-kopaničiarske derby), referring to the neighboring regions where the two towns are located. The first derby in the highest tier was played on 24 August 2012, and ended with Myjava's 1–0 win.

== Sponsorship ==
Period	Kit manufacturer	Shirt sponsor
1999–?	hummel	Slovenský Hodváb
2010–11	hummel	101 Drogerie
2011–12	hummel	Nad Ress
2012–2015	hummel	none
2016–2017	hummel	Business Funding Solutions
2017–2020	hummel	none
2020–2021	hummel	Komplexx Group SK
2021–2022	Adidas	Komplex Group SK; Zoznam.sk

=== Club partners ===
- OMS Lighting
- 101 Drogerie
- Nad-Ress
- Philips
- City of Senica

== Affiliated clubs ==
The following clubs were or are currently affiliated with FK Senica:

- (Brazil) Cruzeiro (2012–?)
- (Brazil) Arapongas (2013–?)
- (Netherlands) ADO Den Haag (2013–?)
- (Nigeria) GBS Academy (2019–present)
- (Turkey) Beşiktaş J.K. (2021–present)

== Results ==
=== League and Cup history ===
Slovak League only (1993–present)

Season	Division (Name)	Pos./Teams	Slovak Cup	Europe		Top Scorer (Goals)
1998–99	3nd (2. Liga)	1				(Slovakia) Vladimír Prokop (27)
1999–00	2nd (1. Liga)	8/(18)	Preliminary round			(Slovakia) Igor Klejch (15)
2000–01	2nd (1. Liga)	17/(18)	Round 1			?
2001–02	3rd (2. Liga)	1/(16)	Quarter-finals			(Slovakia) Jozef Dojčan (7)
2002–03	2nd (1. Liga)	10/(16)	Round 1			(Slovakia) Stanislav Velický (6)
2003–04	2nd (1. Liga)	15/(16)	Round 1			?
2004–05	3rd (2. Liga)		Did not enter			?
2005–06	4th (3. Liga)		Did not enter			?
2006–07	4th (3. Liga)		Did not enter			?
2007–08	4th (3. Liga)		Did not enter			?
2008–09	4th (3. Liga)		Did not enter			?
2009-10	4th (3. Liga)		Did not enter			?
2009–10	1st (Corgoň Liga)	6/(12)	Round 2			(Slovakia) Juraj Piroska (6)
2010–11	1st (Corgoň Liga)	2/(12)	Round 2			(Czech Republic) Ondřej Smetana (18)
2011–12	1st (Corgoň Liga)	4/(12)	Runners-Up	EL	Q3 ( (Austria) RB Salzburg)	(Panama) Rolando Blackburn (5) (Slovakia) Tomáš Kóňa (5) (Czech Republic) Jaroslav Diviš (5)
2012–13	1st (Corgoň Liga)	2/(12)	Quarterfinals	EL	Q2 ( (Cyprus) APOEL)	(Panama) Rolando Blackburn (10)
2013–14	1st (Corgoň Liga)	6/(12)	Semi-finals	EL	Q2 ( (Montenegro) Podgorica)	(Slovakia) Juraj Piroska (13)
2014–15	1st (Fortuna Liga)	5/(12)	Runners-Up			(Czech Republic) Jan Kalabiška (19)
2015–16	1st (Fortuna Liga)	10/(12)	Round 4			(Slovakia) Jozef Dolný (5) (Slovakia) Jakub Hromada (5)
2016–17	1st (Fortuna Liga)	9/(12)	Round 3			(Spain) Pirulo (4) (Slovakia) Samuel Mráz (4)
2017–18	1st (Fortuna Liga)	11/(12)	Round 3			(Colombia) Frank Castañeda (5) (Slovakia) Oliver Podhorín (5)
2018–19	1st (Fortuna Liga)	8/(12)	Semi–finals			(Brazil) Roberto Dias (6)
2019–20	1st (Fortuna Liga)	10/(12)	Round of 16			(Colombia) Frank Castañeda (8)
2020–21	1st (Fortuna Liga)	11/(12)	Round 3			(Slovakia) Tomáš Malec (8)
2021–22	1st (Fortuna Liga)	10/(12)^{1}	Semi-finals			(Democratic Republic of the Congo) Elvis Mashike (7)
2022–23						
2023–24	8th (VIII.liga- dosp. II.tr.-ObFZ SE)	1/(12)	did not enter			(Slovakia) Pavol Škodáček (19)
2024–25	7th (VII.liga- dosp.-MO ObFZ SE)	1/(12)	did not enter			(Slovakia) Teofil Palka (20)
2025–26	6th (VI.liga západ SzFZ)	2/(14)	Round 1			(Slovakia) Ľubomír Ulrich (24)

^{1} FK Senica did not obtain a licence for the 2022–23 season

=== European competition history ===
Season	Competition	Round	Country	Club	Home	Away	Aggregate
2011–12	UEFA Europa League	Q3	(Austria)	Red Bull Salzburg	0–3	0–1	0–4
2012–13	UEFA Europa League	Q1	(Hungary)	MTK Budapest	2–1	1–1	3–2
2012–13	UEFA Europa League	Q2	(Cyprus)	APOEL	0–1	0–2	0–3
2013–14	UEFA Europa League	Q2	(Montenegro)	Mladost Podgorica	0–1	2–2	2–3

=== First international match versus FC Red Bull Salzburg ===
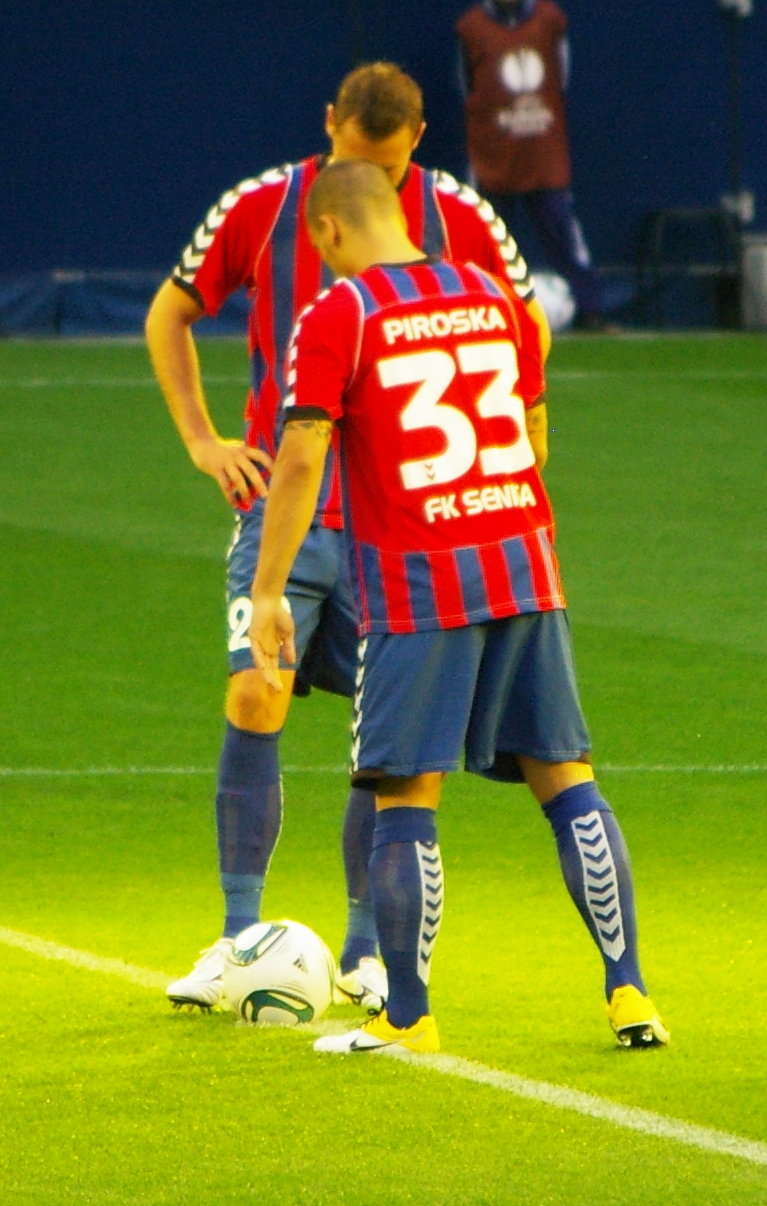

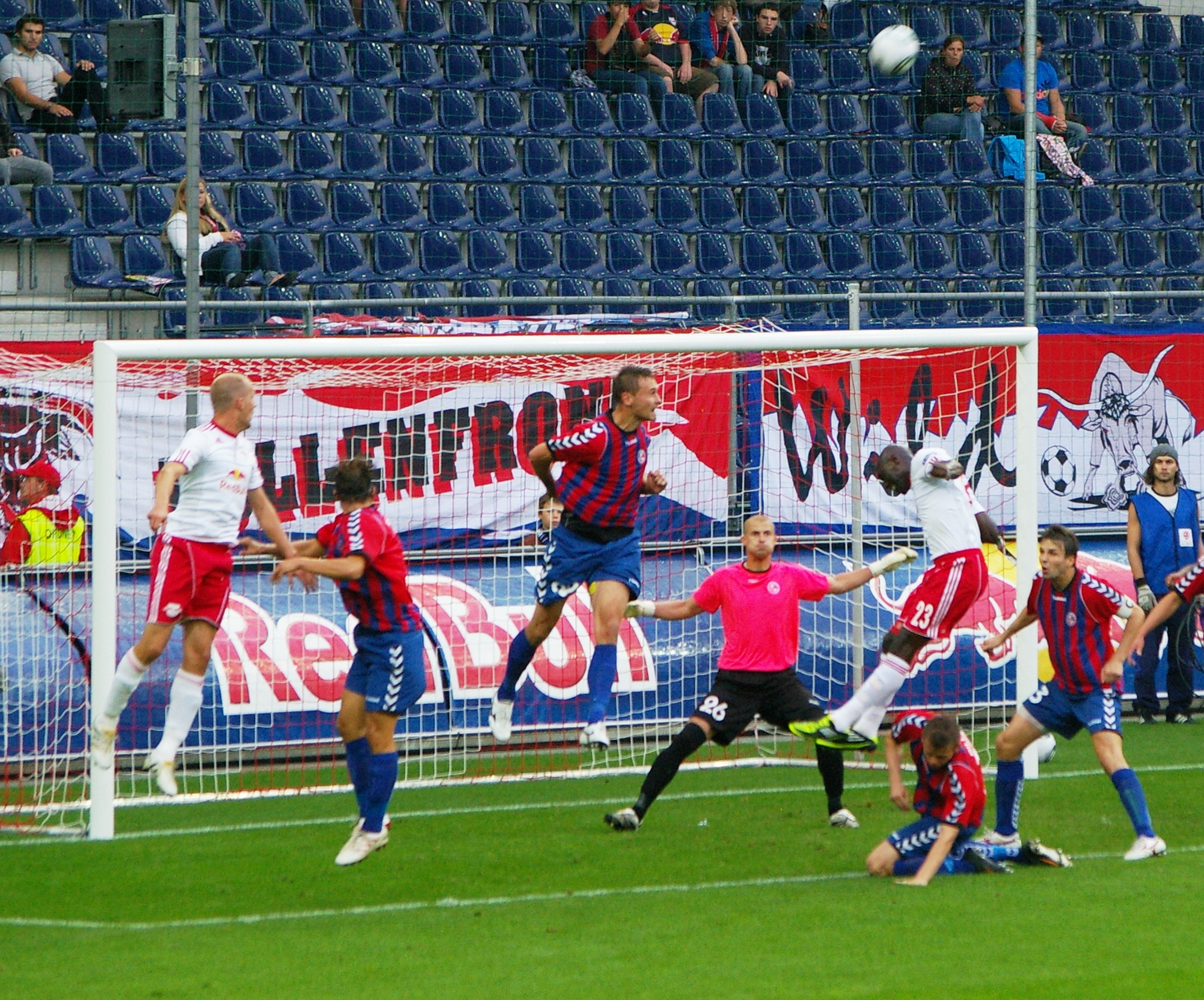

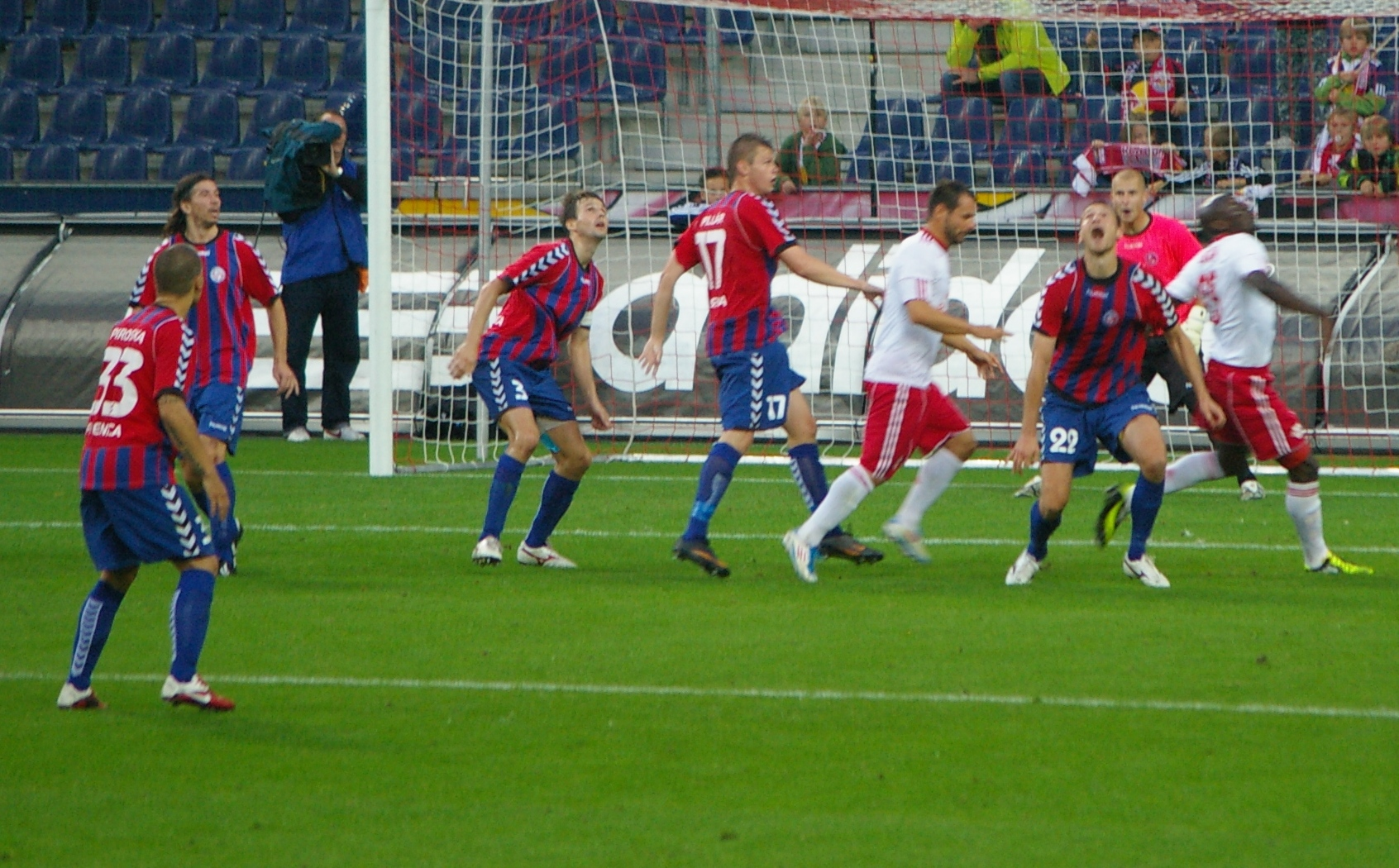

== Player records ==
=== Most goals ===
#	Nat.	Name	Goals
1	(Slovakia)	Juraj Piroska	48
2	(Czech Republic)	Jan Kalabiška	32
3	(Czech Republic)	Jaroslav Diviš	23
4	(Colombia)	Frank Castañeda	18
4	(Czech Republic)	Ondřej Smetana	18
6	(Panama)	Rolando Blackburn	15
7	(Slovakia)	Tomáš Kóňa	13

Players whose name is listed in bold are still active.

== Notable players ==
List of players which had international caps for their respective countries. Players whose name is listed in bold represented their countries while playing for FK Senica.

See Category:FK Senica players for past (and present) players who are the subjects of Wikipedia articles.

AFC

- (Indonesia) **Egy Maulana Vikri**
- (Indonesia) **Witan Sulaeman**

CAF

- (Ghana) Edmund Addo
- (Cape Verde) Kay
- (Central African Republic) Cyriaque Mayounga
- (Ghana) Patrick Asmah
- (Nigeria) Eneji Moses
- (Zimbabwe) Wisdom Mutasa
- (Benin) Désiré Segbé Azankpo
- (Guinea-Bissau) Zezinho
- (Republic of the Congo) Juvhel Tsoumou

CONCACAF

- (Canada) Kris Twardek
- (Costa Rica) **Pedro Leal**
- (Panama) **Rolando Blackburn**

CONMEBOL

- (Venezuela) Eric Ramírez

UEFA

- (Slovakia) Ladislav Almási
- (Slovakia) Marián Bochnovič
- (Czech Republic) Erich Brabec
- (Slovakia) Juraj Chvátal
- (Czech Republic) Jaroslav Černý
- (Slovakia) Erik Čikoš
- (Slovakia) Martin Ďurica
- (Czech Republic) Martin Frýdek
- (Slovakia) Andrej Hesek
- (Slovakia) Filip Hlohovský
- (Slovakia) Dominik Holec
- (Slovakia) Jakub Hromada
- (Czech Republic) Luboš Hušek
- (Slovakia) Michal Jonáš
- (Slovakia) Juraj Kotula
- (Slovakia) **Tomáš Kóňa**
- (Slovakia) Matej Krajčík
- (Slovakia) **Filip Lukšík**
- (Slovakia) Róbert Mazáň
- (Bosnia and Herzegovina) Samir Merzić
- (Slovakia) Samuel Mráz
- (Slovakia) **Juraj Piroska**
- (Slovakia) František Plach
- (Lithuania) Tomas Radzinevičius
- (Slovakia) **Michal Šulla**
- (Slovakia) Lukáš Tesák
- (Slovakia) Michal Tomič
- (Slovakia) Blažej Vaščák
- (Slovakia) Dušan Vrťo

== Managers ==
- (Slovakia) Ladislav Hudec (1 Jul 2009 – 11 Feb 2010)
- (Czech Republic) Radim Nečas (12 Feb 2010 – 31 May 2010)
- (Slovakia) Stanislav Griga (1 Jul 2010 – 26 Apr 2012)
- (Czech Republic) Zdeněk Psotka (1 Jul 2012 – 31 Dec 2012)
- (Slovakia) Vladimír Koník (1 Jan 2013 – 30 Jun 2013)
- (Slovakia) Eduard Pagáč (3 Jun 2013 – 12 Mar 2014)
- (Czech Republic) Pavel Hapal (12 Mar 2014 – 23 Dec 2014)
- (Slovakia) Jozef Kostelník (4 Jan 2015 – 8 May 2015)
- (Slovakia) Eduard Pagáč (8 May 2015 – 8 Sep 2015)
- (Slovakia) Juraj Sabol & (Slovakia) Dušan Vrťo (8 Sep 2015 –26 May 2016)
- (Czech Republic) Aleš Čvančara (30 May 2016 – 19 Jul 2016)
- (Slovakia) Miroslav Mentel (19 Jul 2016 – 16 Jun 2017)
- (Slovakia) Ivan Vrabec (16 Jun 2017 – 11 Sep 2017)
- (Slovakia) Ladislav Hudec (11 Sep 2017 – 8 Feb 2018)
- (Netherlands) Ton Caanen (8 Feb 2018 – 3 Aug 2018)
- (Portugal) Frederico Ricardo (3 Aug 2018 – 9 Jan 2019)
- (Portugal) Ricardo Chéu (9 Jan 2019 – 7 Jun 2019)
- (Czech Republic) Michal Ščasný (8 Jul 2019 – 12 Feb 2020)
- (Slovakia) Eduard Pagáč (16 Feb 2020 – 18 Feb 2020)
- (Slovakia) Patrik Durkáč (18 Feb 2020 – 7 Mar 2020)
- (Slovakia) Ján Bíreš (7 Mar 2020 – 30 Jun 2020)
- (Slovakia) Patrik Durkáč (30 Jun 2020 – 14 Jul 2020)
- (Slovakia) Anton Šoltis (14 Jul 2020 – 20 Feb 2021)
- (Slovakia) Karol Praženica (23 Feb 2021 – 2 Jun 2021)
- (Czech Republic) Pavel Šustr (2 Jun 2021 – 16 April 2022)
- (Slovakia) Libor Fašiang (16 April 2022 – 2023)
- (Slovakia) Martin Bednár (2023 - present)
