= List of foreign Slovak First League players =

This is a list of foreign players in the Slovak First League, which commenced play in 1992. The following players must meet both of the following two criteria:

1. Have played at least one Slovak First League game. Players who were signed by Slovak First League clubs, but only played in lower league, cup and/or European games, or did not play in any competitive games at all, are not included.

In bold: players who have played at least one Slovak First League game in the current season (2011–12), and are still at the clubs for which they've played. This does not include current players of a Slovak First League club who have not played a Slovak First League game in the current season.

Details correct as of end of 2011–12 season. Next update will remove all players at relegated teams and that have left their clubs from Bold status, and add newly promoted teams' players. This will be undertaken on the first day of the 2012–13 season in July 2012.

== Algeria ==
- Samy Derras – FC Spartak Trnava – 2012
- Youssef Haraoui – ŠK Slovan Bratislava – 1993

== Argentina ==
- Aldo Baéz – FK AS Trenčín – 2008–2014
- Iván Díaz – FK AS Trenčín – 2012
- Fabio Nigro – FK Mesto Prievidza, ŠK Slovan Bratislava – 1992–93, 1994–96
- **Nicolas Gorosito** – FK Senica, **ŠK Slovan Bratislava** – 2011–12, 2012–present
- Julio Serrano – ŠK Slovan Bratislava – 2008–10
- Sebastián López – Artmedia Petržalka – 2002–03
- Mauricio Rato – Artmedia Petržalka – 2002–03
- Leonardo Ricatti – ŠK Slovan Bratislava, FK Dukla Banská Bystrica – 1993, 1994
- Sergio Vittor – MŠK Žilina – 2010
- Aldo Mores – FC ViOn Zlaté Moravce – 2008–09
- Leandro Ledesma – ŠK Slovan Bratislava – 2012
- Facundo Serra – ŠK Slovan Bratislava – 2013

== Armenia ==
- Narek Beglaryan – 1. FC Tatran Prešov – 2012

== Austria ==
- Rolf Landerl – FK Inter Bratislava, FK DAC 1904 Dunajská Streda – 1994–97, 2008
- Yüksel Sariyar – FK DAC 1904 Dunajská Streda – 2010
- Markus Seelaus – FK DAC 1904 Dunajská Streda – 2009–10
- Cemil Tosun – FK DAC 1904 Dunajská Streda – 2009
- Sladjan Pajić – FK DAC 1904 Dunajská Streda – 2010–11
- Mato Šimunović – FC Nitra – 2009
- Bartoloměj Kuru – FK DAC 1904 Dunajská Streda – 2009–10
- Taner Ari – FK DAC 1904 Dunajská Streda – 2014

== Azerbaijan ==
- **Ali Ghorbani** – **FC Spartak Trnava** – 2018–present

== Benin ==
- Bello Babatounde – MŠK Žilina – 2006–2014
- Stanislas Toclomiti – MŠK Žilina – 2006
- Salomon Wisdom – MŠK Žilina, FC ViOn Zlaté Moravce – 2006–09, 2008–09

== Bosnia and Herzegovina ==
- Josip Kvesić – MŠK Žilina – 2008–09
- Semir Kerla – MŠK Žilina – 2011–12
- Admir Vladavić – MŠK Žilina – 2007–09, 2010–11
- Josip Čorić – FC Spartak Trnava, FK DAC 1904 Dunajská Streda – 2010, 2011
- Krešimir Kordić – ŠK Slovan Bratislava, FK DAC 1904 Dunajská Streda – 2010–2011, 2012
- Nikola Mikelini – FK DAC 1904 Dunajská Streda – 2010
- Staniša Nikolić – FK DAC 1904 Dunajská Streda – 2009–10, 2012
- Ilija Prodanović – FK DAC 1904 Dunajská Streda – 2012
- Mirko Radovanović – FK AS Trenčín – 2012
- Avdija Vršajević – 1. FC Tatran Prešov – 2008–11
- Dejan Drakul – 1. FC Tatran Prešov – 2009–2010
- Mario Božić – ŠK Slovan Bratislava – 2009–2011
- Samir Merzić – FK Senica – 2010–2011
- Eldar Hasanović – MŠK Žilina – 2008–09
- Almir Gegić – 1. FC Košice, Matador Púchov – 2001–02, 2002–04
- Sergej Jakirović – FC Spartak Trnava – 1995–97
- Velimir Vidić – MŠK Žilina – 2008
- Vladimir Sladojević – MFK Ružomberok – 2004
- Sedat Şahin – FK Dukla Banská Bystrica – 2006–07
- **Haris Hajradinović** – **FK AS Trenčín** – 2013–present
- **Nikola Stijaković** – **MFK Košice** – 2014–present
- **Nermin Haskić** – **MFK Košice** – 2013–present
- Adi Mehremić – MFK Ružomberok – 2013
- Muris Mešanović – FK DAC 1904 Dunajská Streda – 2013
- Irfan Hadžić – FC ViOn Zlaté Moravce – 2014

== Brazil ==
- Aderaldo – MŠK Žilina – 2004
- Mariano Bernardo – 1. FC Tatran Prešov – 2009–2013
- **Ramón** – **FK AS Trenčín** – 2012–present
- Rafael – 1. FC Tatran Prešov – 2011–2012
- Cléber – 1. FC Tatran Prešov – 2008
- Higor – MFK Ružomberok, FC Spartak Trnava, 1. FC Tatran Prešov – 2010, 2010–11, 2011
- **Cleber** – Artmedia Petržalka, FC Nitra, **FC Spartak Trnava** – 2008–09, 2012–2014, 2014–present
- Zé Vitor – ŠK Slovan Bratislava – 2011
- Adauto – MŠK Žilina – 2008–10
- Kaká – FK Senica – 2011
- Wellington – FC Spartak Trnava – 2010–11
- Tiago Bernardini – FC Spartak Trnava – 2009–10
- Gaúcho – FC Senec, ŠK Slovan Bratislava – 2008, 2008–10
- Jymmy França – FC Spartak Trnava – 2009
- Neto – FC Spartak Trnava – 2009–10
- Danilo de Oliveira – FC Spartak Trnava – 2009–10
- Caihame – MFK Petržalka – 2009
- Pedro – MFK Petržalka – 2008–09
- Diogo Pires – ŠK Slovan Bratislava, MFK Petržalka – 2008–10, 2010
- Fabio Gomes – ŠK Slovan Bratislava, FC Spartak Trnava, MFK Ružomberok, MFK Petržalka– 1996–97, 1997–00, 2000–01, 2005–06
- Luis Amaro – MŠK Rimavská Sobota – 2004–05
- Guilherme Barbosa – MŠK Rimavská Sobota – 2005
- Welker – FC Senec – 2006
- Melinho – FK DAC 1904 Dunajská Streda – 2010–12
- Roberto Pítio – FC Spartak Trnava – 2010
- Felipe Azevedo – MFK Petržalka – 2009–10
- Cafu – MFK Petržalka – 2010
- Pio – MFK Ružomberok – 2010
- Raphael Fernandes – MFK Ružomberok – 2005
- Ismael – MFK Ružomberok – 2005
- **William** – FK AS Trenčín, **MŠK Žilina** – 2013, 2014–present
- Dionatan Teixeira – MFK Košice, FK Dukla Banská Bystrica – 2009, 2013–2014
- Hiago – FK Senica – 2013–2014
- Cristovam – FK Senica – 2013–2014
- Gabriel – FK DAC 1904 Dunajská Streda – 2013
- Vitor Gava – FK Senica – 2014
- Jairo – FK AS Trenčín – 2014–2015

== Bulgaria ==
- Branimir Kostadinov – 1. FC Tatran Prešov – 2012

== Cameroon ==
- **Ernest Mabouka** – **MŠK Žilina** – 2010–present
- Léonard Kweuke – FK DAC 1904 Dunajská Streda – 2008–10
- Bondoa Adiaba – FK DAC 1904 Dunajská Streda – 2008–2012
- Ayuk Taku – FK DAC 1904 Dunajská Streda – 2012–2013
- Jean Boya – FK DAC 1904 Dunajská Streda – 2008–2014
- Joël Tchami – FK DAC 1904 Dunajská Streda – 2012
- Martin Abena – FK DAC 1904 Dunajská Streda – 2008–2011
- Jean Michel N'Lend – FK DAC 1904 Dunajská Streda – 2008–2009
- Léandre Tawamba – FC Nitra, MFK Ružomberok – 2013, 2013–2014
- **Noé Kwin** – **FC DAC 1904 Dunajská Streda** – 2013–present
- **Francky N'Guekam** – **FC DAC 1904 Dunajská Streda** – 2014–present

== Canada ==
- Kevin Harmse – FC Nitra – 2006–07

== Central African Republic ==
- Alias Lembakoali – Matador Púchov, FK Inter Bratislava – 1997–01, 2001–05
- Luciano Ray Djim – FC Senec – 2006–07

== Congo ==
- John Delarge – FK DAC 1904 Dunajská Streda – 2011–12
- **Elvis Mashike Sukisa** – **FC ViOn Zlaté Moravce** – 2014–present

== Congo DR ==
- Daniel Bakongolia – FC ViOn Zlaté Moravce – 2008–10
- Mulumba Mukendi – MFK Ružomberok – 2012–2013

== Costa Rica ==
- Pedro Leal – FK Senica – 2011–12

== Croatia ==
- Darko Matić – FC Senec – 2005–06
- Nikola Melnjak – FC Spartak Trnava – 2010
- Mislav Karoglan – MŠK Žilina – 2008–09
- Nikola Schreng – MFK Košice – 2009–10
- Mirko Plantić – FK DAC 1904 Dunajská Streda – 2008–09
- Mate Dragičević – FK DAC 1904 Dunajská Streda – 2008
- Kristijan Polovanec – MŠK Žilina – 2006
- Danijel Kovačević – MŠK Žilina – 2005–06
- **Matej Jelić** – **MŠK Žilina** – 2013–present
- **Darijo Krišto** – **FC DAC 1904 Dunajská Streda** – 2014–present
- Andrej Čaušić – FC DAC 1904 Dunajská Streda – 2014
- Damjan Đoković – FC Spartak Trnava – 2010

== Czech Republic ==
- Jakub Diviš – 1. FC Tatran Prešov – 2009–2013
- Lukáš Zich – MFK Ružomberok – 2012–2013
- Tomáš Josl – 1. FC Tatran Prešov – 2007–11
- Jakub Plánička – 1. FC Tatran Prešov – 2010–2013
- Jiří Kladrubský – ŠK Slovan Bratislava – 2011–2014
- Martin Raška – FC Spartak Trnava – 2010–2013
- Patrik Gross – FC Spartak Trnava – 2010–2013
- **Martin Vyskočil** – ŠK Slovan Bratislava, MŠK Žilina, 1. FC Tatran Prešov, **FC Spartak Trnava** – 2006, 2009–11, 2011, 2011–present
- Jiří Koubský – FC Spartak Trnava – 2011–2012
- Karel Kroupa – MFK Ružomberok, FK Senica, FC Nitra – 2010, 2011, 2012
- Miroslav Štěpánek – FK Senica – 2012
- **Petr Pavlík** – **FK Senica** – 2011–present
- Erich Brabec – FK Senica – 2012–2013
- Petr Hošek – FK Senica, FK DAC 1904 Dunajská Streda – 2011–2013, 2013
- Jaroslav Diviš – FK Senica – 2010–2013
- Adam Varadi – FK Senica – 2012
- **Jan Kalabiška** – **FK Senica** – 2011–present
- Václav Koutný – FK Senica – 2012
- Jaroslav Černý – FK Senica – 2012–2013
- Martin Frýdek – FK Senica – 2012
- Milan Švenger – FK Senica – 2012–2013
- Tomáš Huber – MFK Ružomberok, FK DAC 1904 Dunajská Streda – 2011, 2012–13
- Josef Kaufman – FC Spartak Trnava – 2012
- Ondřej Smetana – FK Senica, ŠK Slovan Bratislava – 2010–11, 2012
- Tomáš Strnad – FK Dukla Banská Bystrica, FK Senica – 2007–08, 2010–12
- Petr Bolek – FC ViOn Zlaté Moravce, FK Senica – 2008–09, 2010–12
- Jiří Skalák – MFK Ružomberok – 2011–12
- Martin Hruška – FC Spartak Trnava, FC ViOn Zlaté Moravce – 2007–10, 2011–12
- Petr Kaspřák – FC Nitra – 2009–12, 2013
- Ondřej Murín – FC Nitra – 2012
- **David Střihavka** – MŠK Žilina, 1. FC Tatran Prešov, **FK Dukla Banská Bystrica** – 2011, 2012, 2014–
- Jan Krob – 1. FC Tatran Prešov – 2011–12, 2013–2014
- Libor Žůrek – 1. FC Tatran Prešov – 2011
- Pavel Malcharek – FC Spartak Trnava – 2011
- Jan Kadlec – FK DAC 1904 Dunajská Streda – 2011
- David Helísek – FK DAC 1904 Dunajská Streda – 2009–11
- Jiří Valenta – FK Senica – 2011
- Petr Šíma – FK Senica – 2011
- David Šmahaj – MFK Ružomberok – 2011
- Tomáš Krbeček – MFK Ružomberok – 2011
- Ivo Táborský – ŠK Slovan Bratislava – 2011
- Lukáš Hartig – Artmedia Petržalka, ŠK Slovan Bratislava – 2005–06, 2011
- Radek Dosoudil – ŠK Slovan Bratislava – 2009–12
- Jan Králík – ŠK Slovan Bratislava – 2008–11
- Tomáš Hrdlička – ŠK Slovan Bratislava – 2011
- Aleš Urbánek – Artmedia Petržalka, FK Senica, FK DAC 1904 Dunajská Streda – 2005–06, 2007–10, 2011, 2012
- Martin Komárek – FK Senica – 2010–11
- Ondřej Šourek – MŠK Žilina – 2008–11
- Emil Rilke – MŠK Žilina – 2008–11
- Jakub Dohnálek – FC Spartak Trnava – 2010–11
- Libor Hrdlička – MFK Ružomberok – 2010–12
- Vojtěch Schulmeister – FC Nitra – 2011
- Lukáš Matůš – FK DAC 1904 Dunajská Streda – 2011–12
- David Čep – 1. FC Tatran Prešov – 2008–11
- Jakub Heidenreich – 1. FC Tatran Prešov – 2011–12
- Tomáš Polách – MFK Dubnica – 1997–00, 2011
- Jan Trousil – MFK Dubnica – 2011
- Dennis Christu – MŠK Žilina – 2010–11
- David Kobylík – MŠK Žilina – 2009–10
- Jakub Rada – ŠK Slovan Bratislava – 2008
- David Bičík – ŠK Slovan Bratislava – 2008–10
- Dominik Rodinger – ŠK Slovan Bratislava, FK Dukla Banská Bystrica – 2008–11, 2013
- Pavel Besta – MFK Ružomberok – 2010
- Petr Faldyna – FK Senica – 2009–11
- Tomáš Čáp – FK Senica – 2009–10
- Jiří Homola – FK Senica – 2009
- Jakub Podaný – FK Senica – 2010
- Jan Halama – FK Senica – 2010
- Tomáš Vrťo – FK Senica – 2010–11, 2013
- Michal Ščasný – 1. FC Tatran Prešov – 2008–10
- Martin Nahodil – FK DAC 1904 Dunajská Streda – 2010
- Benjamin Vomáčka – ŠK Slovan Bratislava, MŠK Žilina – 2002–03, 2004–09
- Pavel Devátý – MŠK Žilina, FC Spartak Trnava – 2006–08, 2008–09
- Lukáš Došek – FC Spartak Trnava – 2008–09
- Václav Drobný – FC Spartak Trnava – 2008–09
- Jiří Mašek – MFK Ružomberok – 2008–09
- Tomáš Pešír – MFK Ružomberok – 2009
- Petr Kobylík – 1. FC Tatran Prešov – 2008–10
- Petr Zapalač – MFK Dubnica – 2009–10
- Lukáš Bodeček – FK DAC 1904 Dunajská Streda – 2009
- Milan Páleník – FK Dukla Banská Bystrica, FK DAC 1904 Dunajská Streda – 2004–07, 2009
- David Kotrys – MFK Ružomberok, FK Dukla Banská Bystrica – 2005–06, 2006–09
- Filip Racko – FC Nitra – 2008–09
- Tomáš Čáp – FK Senica – 2009–10
- Pavel Bartoš – FK Senica – 2009
- Radek Sláma – FK Senica – 2009–10
- Zbyněk Pospěch – Artmedia Petržalka – 2008
- Roman Švrček – FC Nitra – 2008–09
- Jan Gruber – FC Nitra – 2007–09
- Pavel Simr – FC Nitra – 2008–09
- Jakub Hottek – FC Nitra – 2008
- Jan Broschinský – FC Nitra – 2008–09
- Martin Bača – FC Nitra – 2008
- Tomáš Janíček – FC Nitra – 2007–08
- Pavel Vrána – FC Nitra, FK Dukla Banská Bystrica – 2007–08, 2013
- Jan Vojáček – FC Spartak Trnava – 2008
- Lukáš Vaculík – FC Spartak Trnava – 2008
- Lukáš Nachtman – ŠK Slovan Bratislava, MFK Petržalka – 2008–11, 2009
- Martin Švestka – MFK Dubnica, MŠK Žilina, ŠK Slovan Bratislava – 2002–04, 2005–07, 2007–08
- Filip Herda – FK Dukla Banská Bystrica – 2007–09
- Jindřich Skácel – FC ViOn Zlaté Moravce – 2008
- Martin Bednář – FC ViOn Zlaté Moravce – 2007–08
- Jiří Krohmer – 1. FC Tatran Prešov – 2008–09
- Aleš Pikl – 1. FC Tatran Prešov – 2008–09
- Tomáš Kaplan – 1. FC Tatran Prešov – 2008–09
- Martin Kasálek – FK AS Trenčín – 2006–07
- Daniel Tchuř – Artmedia Petržalka – 2004–07
- Aleš Hellebrand – MFK Ružomberok, Artmedia Petržalka – 1999–01, 2001–05
- Radim Wozniak – FK Dukla Banská Bystrica – 2005–06
- Radek Bukač – FK Dukla Banská Bystrica – 2005
- Tomáš Bernady – 1. FC Tatran Prešov, ŠK Slovan Bratislava, Matador Púchov, FK Inter Bratislava – 1990, 1997–01, 2001–05, 2005–07
- Michal Prokeš – Matador Púchov – 2004–06
- Aleš Besta – MŠK Žilina, Matador Púchov – 2003–04, 2004–05
- Jiří Pospíšil – MFK Ružomberok – 2003–07
- Miloš Buchta – FK AS Trenčín, 1. FC Tatran Prešov – 2004–08, 2008–09
- Josef Dvorník – MFK Ružomberok – 2006–07
- Jiří Rychlík – MFK Ružomberok – 2006
- Jan Nezmar – MFK Ružomberok – 2005–07
- Pavel Zbožínek – MFK Ružomberok – 2005–06
- Jan Buryán – Artmedia Petržalka – 2006–08
- Lubomír Blaha – FC Spartak Trnava – 2006
- Jan Nečas – FK AS Trenčín, FC Nitra – 2001–04, 2005–06
- Vít Turtenwald – FC Spartak Trnava – 2005–07
- Tomáš Kaňa – FK AS Trenčín – 2007–08
- Martin Doubek – FK AS Trenčín – 2007
- Roman Dobeš – FK AS Trenčín – 2006–07
- Jiří Barcal – FK AS Trenčín – 2007
- Petr Musil – FK Inter Bratislava – 2006–07
- Marek Čech – MŠK Žilina, FC Spartak Trnava – 2001–03, 2003–04
- Radek Opršal – FC Nitra, 1. FC Košice, FK Inter Bratislava – 2000, 2000–01, 2001–04
- František Ševíský – Artmedia Petržalka – 2002–03
- Jiří Kobr – 1. FC Košice – 2001–04
- Vít Baránek – 1. FC Košice – 2003
- Martin Černoch – 1. HFC Humenné, FC Spartak Trnava – 1999–00, 2000–01
- Lubor Knapp – Ozeta Dukla Trenčín, FC Spartak Trnava, FC Senec – 2001, 2001–02, 2008
- Radim Nečas – ŠK Slovan Bratislava – 2001–03
- Pavel Hašek – Artmedia Petržalka – 2008
- Jakub Řezníček – MFK Ružomberok – 2009–10
- Petr Švancara – FK Inter Bratislava – 2007–09
- Petr Lysáček – ZŤS Dubnica – 2001–03
- Petr Vybíral – Tatran Prešov – 2001–02
- Leoš Mitas – Tatran Prešov – 2001
- David Homoláč – ŠK Slovan Bratislava – 2002–03
- Pavel Putík – MŠK Žilina – 2003
- Tomáš Mazouch – MFK Dubnica – 2004–05
- Radim Krupník – FK AS Trenčín – 2003–04
- Karel Vácha – Artmedia Petržalka – 2003
- Radek Krejčík – Artmedia Petržalka – 2003–05
- Zdeněk Valnoha – MFK Ružomberok – 2003
- Milan Kopic – ŠK Slovan Bratislava – 2012
- Vlastimil Stožický – FC Spartak Trnava – 2012
- Lukáš Kutra – FC Nitra – 2013–2014
- **Erik Daniel** – **Spartak Myjava** – 2013–present
- Milan Jirásek – FK Senica – 2013–2014
- **Pavel Fořt** – **ŠK Slovan Bratislava** – 2013–present
- Pavel Čermák – FK Senica – 2013
- Martin Zeman – FK Senica – 2013
- Martin Hála – FC Nitra – 2013
- Adam Ševčík – FC Nitra – 2013
- Tomáš Poznar – FC Spartak Trnava – 2013
- Jan Kliment – FK Dukla Banská Bystrica – 2014
- Jiří Böhm – FC Nitra – 2014
- Dušan Nulíček – FK DAC 1904 Dunajská Streda – 2013
- **Tomáš Jablonský** – **ŠK Slovan Bratislava** – 2014–present
- **Luboš Hušek** – **FK Senica** – 2014–present
- **Petr Wojnar** – **FK Dukla Banská Bystrica** – 2014–present
- **Nicolas Šumský** – **FK Dukla Banská Bystrica** – 2014–present

== Djibouti ==
- Ahmed Kadar – FK DAC 1904 Dunajská Streda – 2008–11

== England ==
- **Andre Green** – **Slovan Bratislava** – 2021–2023
- **James Lawrence** – **FK AS Trenčín** – 2014–2018

== Finland ==
- **Matej Hradecky – MFK Skalica** – 2024–
- **Kevin Kouassivi-Benissan – FC Košice** – 2025–
- Juha Pirinen – AS Trenčín – 2020–2022
- Tani Stafsula – FC DAC 1904 Dunajská Streda – 2009

== France ==
- Floris Isola – MFK Košice – 2011–12
- **Karim Coulibaly** – **MFK Košice** – 2011–present
- Victor Abdou Samb – FK Senica – 2009–10
- Youssouf Kanté – MFK Košice – 2009–10
- Youssef Moughfire – FC Senec, FK DAC 1904 Dunajská Streda – 2005–07, 2008–09
- Jim Ablancourt – MFK Ružomberok – 2005–06
- Toto Sena Govou – MFK Košice – 2011
- **Oumar Diaby** – **MFK Košice** – 2012–present

== Gabon ==
- Arsène Copa – FK DAC 1904 Dunajská Streda – 2012

== Gambia ==
- Momodou Ceesay – MŠK Žilina – 2010–2012
- Ali Ceesay – MŠK Žilina – 2011–2013

== Georgia ==
- Giorgi Tsimakuridze – MŠK Žilina – 2009
- Irakli Liluashvili – FC Nitra – 2007–10

== Germany ==
- Yusuf Adewunmi – MFK Petržalka – 2007
- Juvhel Tsoumou – FK Senica – 2013

== Ghana ==
- Prince Ofori – MŠK Žilina – 2006–12
- Prince Addai – FK AS Trenčín – 2008
- William Anane – FC Senec – 2005–06
- John Mensah – FC Nitra – 2014

== Greece ==
- Angelos Chanti – FK AS Trenčín – 2008–09

== Guinea ==
- Boubacar Diallo – FC Spartak Trnava – 2010–11
- **Seydouba Soumah** – – FC Nitra, **ŠK Slovan Bratislava** – 2012, 2013–present
- Aboubacar Fofana – FK Dukla Banská Bystrica – 2007

== Guinea-Bissau ==
- Vladimir Forbs – FC Nitra – 2014

== Honduras ==
- Luis Ramos – MŠK Žilina, FC Nitra – 2005–06, 2006–07

== Hungary ==
- Csaba Regedei – FK DAC 1904 Dunajská Streda – 2008–09

== Indonesia ==
- Egy Maulana Vikri – FK Senica, FC ViOn Zlaté Moravce – 2021–22, 2022–23
- Witan Sulaeman – FK Senica, AS Trenčín – 2021–22, 2022

== Iran ==
- Javad Razzaghi – FK DAC 1904 Dunajská Streda – 2002–03
- Farzad Ashoubi – FK DAC 1904 Dunajská Streda – 2003–04
- Reza Ghanizadeh – FK DAC 1904 Dunajská Streda – 2005–06, 2013–14
- Mohammad Parvin – FK DAC 1904 Dunajská Streda – 2008–09
- Behshad Yavarzadeh – FK DAC 1904 Dunajská Streda – 2009–10

== Italy ==
- Giovanni Speranza – FK DAC 1904 Dunajská Streda – 2009
- **Marco De Vito** – **FK Dukla Banská Bystrica** – 2013–present

== Ivory Coast ==
- Koro Koné – FC Spartak Trnava – 2009–11
- **Mamadou Bagayoko** – Artmedia Petržalka, **ŠK Slovan Bratislava** – 2009, 2008–present
- Lamine Diarrassouba – FK Senica – 2012–2013
- **Soune Soungole** – **FC Spartak Trnava** – 2014–present

== Kenya ==
- Patrick Oboya – MFK Ružomberok – 2012

== Kazakhstan ==
- Shakhmurza Adyrbekov – AS Trenčín – 2025–present

== Korea Republic ==
- Kim Tae-Hyung – FK Senica – 2010

== Kuwait ==
- Khalid Al-Rashidi – 1. FC Tatran Prešov – 2008–10

== Latvia ==
- Artūrs Zjuzins – MŠK Žilina – 2011

== Lithuania ==
- Tomas Radzinevičius – FK Senica – 2010
- Marius Kazlauskas – FK DAC 1904 Dunajská Streda – 2009–2010
- Ričardas Beniušis – FK DAC 1904 Dunajská Streda – 2009
- Egidijus Majus – FK DAC 1904 Dunajská Streda – 2009–10, 2011

== Macedonia ==
- Aleksandar Bajevski – FK DAC 1904 Dunajská Streda – 2009–10
- Ilami Halimi – FK DAC 1904 Dunajská Streda – 2009–11
- **Dejan Iliev** – **ŠKF Sereď** – 2019–present
- Kire Markoski – FC Spartak Trnava – 2018
- Dejan Peševski – MFK Ružomberok, FC Spartak Trnava – 2013, 2013
- Shaqir Rexhepi – MFK Košice – 2012
- Ardit Shaqiri – MFK Ružomberok – 2010–11
- Darko Tofiloski – MFK Košice, MFK Ružomberok, FC DAC 1904 Dunajská Streda – 2010–15, 2015–16, 2016–17

== Malta ==
- **Jean Paul Farrugia** – **FC Spartak Trnava** – 2014–present

== Mexico ==
- Manuel Rivera – FC Spartak Trnava – 2006

== Mongolia ==
- **Ganbayar Ganbold** – **KFC Komárno** – 2024–present

== Montenegro ==
- Ivica Kralj – FC Spartak Trnava – 2008–09
- Nenad Đurović – FC Spartak Trnava – 2008
- Marko Kerić – FC Spartak Trnava – 2004–05
- Dejan Boljević – 1. FC Tatran Prešov – 2012

== Netherlands ==
- Wim Bokila – MŠK Žilina – 2011
- Samuel Koejoe – FK DAC 1904 Dunajská Streda – 2009–10
- Stef Wijlaars – FK Senica – 2010–2013
- Danny van der Ree – FK AS Trenčín – 2008
- Thijs Sluijter – FK AS Trenčín – 2008
- Gino van Kessel – FK AS Trenčín – 2013–2014

== Niger ==
- Siradji Sani – MFK Dubnica, FK Inter Bratislava – 2001–02, 2002

== Nigeria ==
- Onome Sodje – FK Senica – 2010
- Hector Tubonemi – MFK Dubnica – 2010
- Duke Udi – ŠK Slovan Bratislava – 1996–97
- Fanendo Adi – FK AS Trenčín – 2009–11, 2012–13
- **Peter Nworah** – FC Spartak Trnava, **FO ŽP Šport Podbrezová** – 2013–14, 2014–present
- Franklin Ekene Igwe – FC Nitra – 2014
- Christian Irobiso – FK Senica – 2014
- **Kingsley Madu** – **FK AS Trenčín** – 2014–present
- **Moses Simon** – **FK AS Trenčín** – 2014–present
- **Rabiu Ibrahim** – **FK AS Trenčín** – 2014–present
- **Emmanuel Edmond** – **FK AS Trenčín** – 2014–present

== Panama ==
- Rolando Blackburn – FK Senica – 2012–13

== Paraguay ==
- Jorge Salinas – FK AS Trenčín – 2011–12

== Peru ==
- Jean Deza – MŠK Žilina – 2011–present

== Philippines ==
- Stephan Palla – FK DAC 1904 Dunajská Streda – 2010

== Poland ==
- Gerard Bieszczad – MFK Zemplín Michalovce – 2017–19
- Konrad Gruszkowski – FK DAC 1904 Dunajská Streda – 2023–25
- Jakub Kiwior – FK Železiarne Podbrezová, MŠK Žilina – 2018–22
- Miłosz Kozak – FC Spartak Trnava – 2021–23
- Tomasz Kucz – FK DAC 1904 Dunajská Streda – 2018–19
- Dawid Kurminowski – MFK Zemplín Michalovce, MŠK Žilina – 2018–21
- Patryk Małecki – FC Spartak Trnava – 2018–19
- Tomasz Nawotka – MFK Zemplín Michalovce – 2018–19
- Aleksander Paluszek – FK Pohronie – 2021–22
- Daniel Skiba – FK Železiarne Podbrezová – 2019–20
- Grzegorz Szamotulski – FK DAC 1904 Dunajská Streda – 2009–10
- Dawid Szymonowicz – FC ViOn Zlaté Moravce – 2017–18
- Daniel Ściślak – FK Pohronie – 2021–22
- Jakub Więzik – 1. FC Tatran Prešov, FK Železiarne Podbrezová – 2017–19
- Mateusz Zachara – FK Pohronie – 2019–20

== Portugal ==
- Ricardo Nunes – MŠK Žilina – 2012–2013
- Guima – MŠK Žilina – 2012
- Bruno Simão – ŠK Slovan Bratislava – 2009

== Romania ==
- Marius Alexe – Podbrezová – 2017
- Omer Damianovici – ŠK Slovan Bratislava – 2001
- Bogdan Mitrea – Spartak Trnava – 2019–

== Russia ==
- Nika Piliyev – ŠK Slovan Bratislava – 2012
- Dmitri Kraush – Baník Prievidza, Matador Púchov – 1993–98, 1998–03
- Stanislav Tskhovrebov – ŠK Slovan Bratislava, FC Nitra – 1993, 1993–94
- Aleksei Snigiryov – 1. FC Košice – 1999

== Senegal ==
- Souleymane Fall – FC Spartak Trnava – 1999–06
- Papé Diakite – FK AS Trenčín – 2011–12
- Mouhamadou Seye – MFK Dubnica, FK Dukla Banská Bystrica – 2007–09, 2009–11
- Samba El Hadji Kebe – FC Spartak Trnava – 2009
- Amdy Gueye – FC Spartak Trnava – 2008–09
- Babacar Niang – FC Spartak Trnava – 2008–09

== Serbia ==
- Nemanja Matić – MFK Košice – 2007–09
- Nemanja Vidaković – FK DAC 1904 Dunajská Streda – 2010
- Dušan Matović – FK Inter Bratislava – 2006–07
- **Saša Savić** – **FK Dukla Banská Bystrica** – 2009–present
- **Boris Sekulić** – **MFK Košice** – 2012–present
- **Ivan Ostojić** – **MFK Košice** – 2012–present
- Uroš Matić – MFK Košice – 2009–2013
- **Marko Milinković** – MFK Košice, **ŠK Slovan Bratislava** – 2007–11, 2011–present
- Miroslav Marković – MFK Ružomberok – 2012
- Ivan Đoković – MFK Košice – 2010–12
- Samir Nurković – MFK Košice, FC ViOn Zlaté Moravce, FC DAC 1904 Dunajská Streda – 2011–12, 2013, 2014
- Miloje Preković – MFK Košice – 2011–12
- Milomir Sivčević – MFK Ružomberok – 2007–12
- Nemanja Zlatković – MŠK Žilina – 2009–11
- Marko Radić – MFK Ružomberok – 2010–11
- Marko Jakšić – MFK Ružomberok – 2010–11
- Marko Blažić – MFK Ružomberok – 2011
- **Srdjan Grabež** – MFK Dubnica, **FC Spartak Trnava** – 2010–11, 2013–present
- Aleksandar Paunović – MFK Košice – 2010
- Miloš Stojanović – FC ViOn Zlaté Moravce – 2010
- Borivoje Filipović – FC Spartak Trnava – 2007–09
- Nebojša Jelenković – FC Spartak Trnava – 2008–09
- Milorad Bukvić – ŠK Slovan Bratislava, Artmedia Petržalka – 2003–04, 2004–05, 2009
- Stefan Gavarić – MŠK Žilina – 2005–06
- Predrag Mijić – MFK Ružomberok – 2004–05
- Vojin Prole – ŠK Slovan Bratislava – 2001–07
- Branislav Vukomanović – Artmedia Petržalka – 2006–07
- Dragan Mojić – ŠK Slovan Bratislava – 2001–02
- Kosta Bjedov – MFK Košice – 2007
- Ivan Trifunović – Matador Púchov – 2001–02
- Saša Mićović – FK Inter Bratislava – 2001–02
- Bojan Čukić – MFK Košice – 2010
- Vladan Spasojević – MFK Košice – 2010
- Zlatko Zebić – 1. FC Košice – 2000–01
- Nebojša Klještan – ŠK Slovan Bratislava – 2001–02
- Milisav Šećković – FK Inter Bratislava – 2001–02
- Miloš Obradović – FC Nitra – 2013
- **Dušan Plavšić** – **FK Dukla Banská Bystrica** – 2014–present
- **Bojan Knežević** – **FC Spartak Trnava** – 2014–present
- **Milan Rundić** – **FK AS Trenčín** – 2013–present
- **Lazar Đorđević** – **MFK Košice** – 2013–present
- Milorad Nikolić – MFK Ružomberok – 2013–2014
- Goran Adamović – MFK Ružomberok – 2013–2014
- **Stefan Durić** – **FC Spartak Trnava** – 2014–present
- **Miloš Nikolić** – **FC ViOn Zlaté Moravce** – 2014–present
- **Dušan Đuričić** – **FC ViOn Zlaté Moravce** – 2014–present
- **Branislav Stanić** – **FC ViOn Zlaté Moravce** – 2014–present
- **Nikola Andrić** – **ŽP Šport Podbrezová** – 2011–present
- **Miloš Josimov** – **ŠK Slovan Bratislava** – 2013–present

== Slovenia ==
- Dare Vršič – MŠK Žilina – 2005–07
- Andrej Pečnik – ŠK Slovan Bratislava – 2010–11
- **Ajdin Redzić** – **MFK Košice** – 2014–present
- Matic Maruško – FC Spartak Trnava – 2013

== South Africa ==
- Bridget Motha – FK Senica – 2011
- Sibusiso Ntuli – FC Nitra – 2011

== Spain ==
- Juanpe – 1. FC Tatran Prešov – 2009–10
- Juan Carlos Pozo – 1. FC Tatran Prešov – 2008–09
- Fernando – MFK Košice – 2009–10, 2011–12
- Stefan Milojević – MFK Košice – 2012
- Gerrit Stoeten – MFK Košice – 2010
- Antonio Megías – MFK Košice – 2010
- Carlos Pérez – FC Spartak Trnava – 2008–09
- Eric Barroso – FC Nitra – 2013
- **José Casado** – **FC Spartak Trnava** – 2014–present

== Syria ==
- **Ammar Ramadan** – FC Spartak Trnava, **FC DAC 1904 Dunajská Streda** – 2021–22, 2022–present

== Togo ==
- Serge Akakpo – MŠK Žilina – 2012–2013

== Trinidad and Tobago ==
- **Lester Peltier** – FK AS Trenčín, **ŠK Slovan Bratislava** – 2011–12, 2012–present

== Tunisia ==
- Nizar Ben Nasra – FC DAC 1904 Dunajská Streda – 2013–2014

== Ukraine ==
- Anton Lysyuk – 1. FC Tatran Prešov – 2012
- Mykhaylo Olefirenko – 1. FC Tatran Prešov – 1991–92
- Andriy Yakovlev – 1. FC Tatran Prešov – 2012–2013
- Oleksandr Pyschur – MFK Ružomberok – 2009–10
- Ruslan Lyubarskyi – Chemlon Humenné, 1. FC Košice – 1993–96, 1997–00
- Serhiy Zaytsev – 1. FC Tatran Prešov, FK AS Trenčín, 1. FC Košice – 1997–00, 2001–02, 2000–01, 2002–03
- Viktor Dvirnyk – FK Inter Bratislava – 1995
- Oleksandr Holokolosov – ZŤS Dubnica – 1997–98, 2002–03
- Andriy Shevchuk – 1. FC Tatran Prešov – 2012
- Andriy Slinkin – FK Senica – 2014

== Uruguay ==
- Sebastián Sosa – FK Senica – 2014

== Uzbekistan ==
- Aziz Ibrahimov – ŠK Slovan Bratislava – 2007–08

== Venezuela ==
- Fernando de Ornelas – ŠK Slovan Bratislava – 2000

== Zimbabwe ==
- Kennedy Chihuri – 1. FC Tatran Prešov – 1994–96
- Alois Bunjira – ŠK Slovan Bratislava – 1995
