= Carlos Pérez =

Carlos Pérez or Perez may refer to:

== Sportspeople ==
=== Association football ===
- Carlos Pérez Salvachúa (born 1973), Spanish football manager
- Carlos Pérez (footballer, born 1971) (1971–2006), Spanish football midfielder
- Carlos Pérez (footballer, born 1984), Spanish football winger
- Carlos Pérez (Paraguayan footballer) (born 1984), Paraguayan football forward
- Carlos Roberto Pérez (born 1968), Mexican football manager and former player

=== Baseball ===
- Carlos Pérez (pitcher) (born 1971), Dominican baseball player
- Carlos Pérez (catcher, born 1990), Venezuelan baseball player
- Carlos Pérez (catcher, born 1996), Venezuelan baseball player

=== Other sports ===
- Carlos Gil Pérez (1931–2009), Spanish athletics coach
- Carlos Pérez (discus thrower), Mexican athlete at the 1946 Central American and Caribbean Games
- Carlos Pérez (runner) (born 1935), Spanish long-distance runner
- Carlos Pérez (long jumper), Spanish track and field athlete
- Carlos Pérez (handballer) (born 1971), Cuban-Hungarian handball player
- Carlos Pérez (canoeist) (born 1979), Spanish flatwater canoer and former world champion
- Carlos Pérez (cyclist) (born 1970), Argentine cyclist
- Carlos Pérez (weightlifter) (born 1938), Nicaraguan Olympic weightlifter
- Carlos Pérez Suárez (born 1994), Mexican boxer

== Other ==
- Carlos Andrés Pérez (1922–2010), president of Venezuela
- Carlos Pérez (radiation oncologist) (born 1934), American radiation oncologist
- Carlos Pérez Soto (born 1954), Chilean physics lecturer
- Carlos Pérez (guitarist) (born 1976), Chilean classical guitarist
- Carlos Pérez (director), Puerto Rican film and music video director

== See also ==
- Carlos A. Peres, Brazilian biologist (born 1963)
