= 2007 UEFA European Under-21 Championship squads =

Football team member listings

Only players born on or after 1 January 1984 are eligible to play.

Players in bold have now been capped at full international level.

== Group A ==
=== Belgium ===
Head coach: Jean-François De Sart

No.	Pos.	Player	Date of birth (age)	Caps	Club
1	GK	**Logan Bailly**	27 December 1985 (aged 21)		(Belgium) Racing Genk
2	DF	**Sepp De Roover**	12 November 1984 (aged 22)		(Netherlands) Sparta Rotterdam
3	DF	**Steve Colpaert**	13 September 1986 (aged 20)		(Belgium) FC Brussels
4	DF	**Thomas Vermaelen**	14 November 1985 (aged 21)		(Netherlands) Ajax
5	DF	**Landry Mulemo**	17 September 1986 (aged 20)		(Belgium) Standard Liège
6	DF	**Nicolas Lombaerts**	20 March 1985 (aged 22)		(Belgium) Gent
7	MF	**Killian Overmeire**	6 December 1985 (aged 21)		(Belgium) Lokeren
8	MF	**Faris Haroun**	22 September 1985 (aged 21)		(Belgium) Racing Genk
9	FW	**Kevin Mirallas**	5 October 1987 (aged 19)		(France) Lille
10	MF	**Jan Vertonghen**	24 April 1987 (aged 20)		(Netherlands) Ajax
11	MF	**Maarten Martens**	2 July 1984 (aged 22)		(Netherlands) AZ
12	GK	Frank Boeckx	27 September 1986 (aged 20)		(Belgium) Sint-Truiden
13	DF	**Guillaume Gillet**	9 March 1985 (aged 22)		(Belgium) Gent
14	FW	**Tom De Mul**	4 March 1986 (aged 21)		(Netherlands) Ajax
15	DF	**Sébastien Pocognoli**	1 August 1987 (aged 19)		(Belgium) Racing Genk
16	FW	**Tom De Sutter**	3 July 1985 (aged 21)		(Belgium) Cercle Brugge
17	MF	**Marouane Fellaini**	22 November 1987 (aged 19)		(Belgium) Standard Liège
18	DF	**Laurent Ciman**	5 August 1985 (aged 21)		(Belgium) Charleroi
19	FW	**Stijn de Smet**	27 March 1985 (aged 22)		(Belgium) Cercle Brugge
20	DF	**Anthony Vanden Borre**	24 October 1987 (aged 19)		(Belgium) Anderlecht
21	GK	Michaël Cordier	27 March 1984 (aged 23)		(Belgium) FC Brussels
22	MF	**Jonathan Blondel**	3 April 1984 (aged 23)		(Belgium) Club Brugge
23	MF	**Axel Witsel**	12 January 1989 (aged 18)		(Belgium) Standard Liège

=== Israel ===
Head coach: Guy Levy

No.	Pos.	Player	Date of birth (age)	Caps	Club
1	GK	Ohad Levita	17 February 1986 (aged 21)		(Israel) Hapoel Kfar Saba
2	DF	**Yuval Spungin**	3 April 1987 (aged 20)		(Israel) Maccabi Tel Aviv
3	DF	**Eliran Danin**	29 March 1984 (aged 23)		(Israel) Beitar Jerusalem
4	DF	**Shai Maimon**	18 March 1986 (aged 21)		(Israel) Maccabi Haifa
5	DF	**Dekel Keinan**	15 September 1984 (aged 22)		(Israel) Maccabi Haifa
6	MF	Lior Jan	24 October 1987 (aged 19)		(Israel) Maccabi Tel Aviv
7	MF	Idan Srur	5 October 1986 (aged 20)		(Israel) Hapoel Petah Tikva
8	MF	**Aviram Baruchyan**	20 March 1985 (aged 22)		(Israel) Beitar Jerusalem
9	FW	**Barak Yitzhaki**	25 September 1984 (aged 22)		(Israel) Beitar Jerusalem
10	FW	**Toto Tamuz**	4 January 1988 (aged 19)		(Israel) Beitar Jerusalem
11	FW	Omer Peretz	26 January 1986 (aged 21)		(Israel) Maccabi Tel Aviv
12	DF	Rami Duani	25 May 1987 (aged 20)		(Israel) Hapoel Tel Aviv
13	DF	Nitzan Damari	13 January 1987 (aged 20)		(Israel) Maccabi Petah Tikva
14	FW	**Shlomi Arbeitman**	14 May 1985 (aged 22)		(Israel) Maccabi Haifa
15	DF	Naor Peser	18 October 1985 (aged 21)		(Israel) Maccabi Petah Tikva
16	FW	**Amit Ben-Shushan**	20 March 1985 (aged 22)		(Israel) Beitar Jerusalem
17	FW	**Ben Sahar**	10 August 1989 (aged 17)		(England) Chelsea
18	GK	Tom Almadon	30 November 1984 (aged 22)		(Israel) Maccabi Haifa
19	DF	**Dani Bondar**	7 February 1987 (aged 20)		(Israel) Hapoel Tel Aviv
20	MF	Amir Taga	1 February 1985 (aged 22)		(Israel) Maccabi Netanya
21	MF	**Shiran Yeini**	18 December 1986 (aged 20)		(Israel) Maccabi Tel Aviv
22	MF	**Lior Rafaelov**	26 April 1986 (aged 21)		(Israel) Maccabi Haifa
23	GK	Yossi Shekel	24 September 1984 (aged 22)		(Israel) Maccabi Herzliya

=== Netherlands ===
Head coach: Foppe de Haan

No.	Pos.	Player	Date of birth (age)	Caps	Club
1	GK	Boy Waterman	24 January 1984 (aged 23)		(Netherlands) Heerenveen
2	DF	Gianni Zuiverloon	30 December 1986 (aged 20)		(Netherlands) Heerenveen
3	DF	**Ron Vlaar**	16 February 1985 (aged 22)		(Netherlands) Feyenoord
4	DF	Arnold Kruiswijk	2 November 1984 (aged 22)		(Netherlands) Groningen
5	DF	**Erik Pieters**	7 August 1988 (aged 18)		(Netherlands) Utrecht
6	MF	**Hedwiges Maduro**	13 February 1985 (aged 22)		(Netherlands) Ajax
7	FW	Julian Jenner	28 February 1984 (aged 23)		(Netherlands) AZ
8	MF	**Royston Drenthe**	8 April 1987 (aged 20)		(Netherlands) Feyenoord
9	FW	**Ryan Babel**	19 December 1986 (aged 20)		(Netherlands) Ajax
10	MF	**Ismail Aissati**	16 August 1988 (aged 18)		(Netherlands) PSV
11	FW	Daniël de Ridder	6 March 1984 (aged 23)		(Spain) Celta Vigo
12	MF	Luigi Bruins	9 March 1987 (aged 20)		(Netherlands) Excelsior
13	FW	Maceo Rigters	22 January 1984 (aged 23)		(Netherlands) NAC Breda
14	FW	**Roy Beerens**	22 December 1987 (aged 19)		(Netherlands) PSV
15	MF	Robbert Schilder	18 April 1986 (aged 21)		(Netherlands) Ajax
16	GK	**Kenneth Vermeer**	10 January 1986 (aged 21)		(Netherlands) Ajax
17	MF	**Haris Medunjanin**	8 March 1985 (aged 22)		(Netherlands) AZ
18	DF	**Ryan Donk**	30 March 1986 (aged 21)		(Netherlands) AZ
19	DF	Calvin Jong-a-Pin	18 July 1986 (aged 20)		(Netherlands) Heerenveen
20	FW	Tim Janssen	6 March 1986 (aged 21)		(Netherlands) RKC Waalwijk
21	DF	Frank van der Struijk	28 March 1985 (aged 22)		(Netherlands) Willem II
22	FW	**Otman Bakkal**	27 February 1985 (aged 22)		(Netherlands) PSV
23	GK	**Tim Krul**	3 April 1988 (aged 19)		(England) Newcastle United

=== Portugal ===
Head coach: José Couceiro

No.	Pos.	Player	Date of birth (age)	Caps	Club
1	GK	Paulo Ribeiro	6 June 1984 (aged 23)		(Portugal) Porto
2	DF	Eurípedes	5 August 1984 (aged 22)		(Portugal) Benfica
3	DF	**João Pereira**	25 February 1984 (aged 23)		(Portugal) Gil Vicente
4	MF	**Miguel Veloso**	11 May 1986 (aged 21)		(Portugal) Sporting CP
5	DF	José Semedo	11 January 1985 (aged 22)		(Portugal) Sporting CP
6	MF	Sérgio Organista	26 August 1984 (aged 22)		(Spain) Pontevedra
7	MF	Filipe Oliveira	27 May 1984 (aged 23)		(Portugal) Marítimo
8	MF	**Manuel Fernandes**	5 February 1986 (aged 21)		(Portugal) Benfica
9	FW	**Hugo Almeida**	23 May 1984 (aged 23)		(Portugal) Porto
10	MF	**João Moutinho**	8 September 1986 (aged 20)		(Portugal) Sporting CP
11	DF	José Gonçalves	17 September 1985 (aged 21)		(Lithuania) Kaunas
12	GK	Ricardo Batista	19 November 1986 (aged 20)		(England) Fulham
13	DF	**Rolando**	31 August 1985 (aged 21)		(Portugal) Belenenses
14	MF	**Paulo Machado**	31 March 1986 (aged 21)		(Portugal) Porto
15	MF	**Ruben Amorim**	27 January 1985 (aged 22)		(Portugal) Belenenses
16	FW	João Moreira	7 February 1986 (aged 21)		(Spain) Valencia
17	FW	Ricardo Vaz Tê	1 October 1986 (aged 20)		(England) Bolton Wanderers
18	MF	**Nani**	17 November 1986 (aged 20)		(Portugal) Sporting CP
19	FW	**Silvestre Varela**	2 February 1985 (aged 22)		(Portugal) Sporting CP
20	FW	**Yannick Djaló**	5 May 1986 (aged 21)		(Portugal) Sporting CP
21	DF	**Vitorino Antunes**	1 April 1987 (aged 20)		(Portugal) Paços de Ferreira
22	GK	João Botelho	22 September 1985 (aged 21)		(Portugal) Santa Clara
23	DF	**Manuel da Costa**	6 May 1986 (aged 21)		(Netherlands) PSV

== Group B ==
=== Czech Republic ===
Head coach: Ladislav Škorpil

No.	Pos.	Player	Date of birth (age)	Caps	Club
1	GK	**Zdeněk Zlámal**	5 November 1985 (aged 21)		(Czech Republic) Tescoma Zlín
2	DF	Josef Kaufman	27 March 1984 (aged 23)		(Czech Republic) Teplice
3	DF	Martin Kuncl	1 April 1984 (aged 23)		(Czech Republic) Brno
4	DF	**Roman Hubník**	6 June 1984 (aged 23)		(Russia) FC Moscow
5	DF	**Michal Kadlec**	13 December 1984 (aged 22)		(Czech Republic) Sparta Prague
6	MF	**Luboš Hušek**	26 January 1984 (aged 23)		(Czech Republic) Sparta Prague
7	MF	**Daniel Kolář**	27 October 1985 (aged 21)		(Czech Republic) Sparta Prague
8	MF	Tomáš Jirsák	29 June 1984 (aged 22)		(Czech Republic) Teplice
9	FW	Tomáš Krbeček	27 October 1985 (aged 21)		(Czech Republic) Viktoria Plzeň
10	FW	Jan Holenda	22 August 1985 (aged 21)		(Czech Republic) Dynamo České Budějovice
11	MF	**Daniel Pudil**	27 September 1985 (aged 21)		(Czech Republic) Slovan Liberec
12	MF	**Michal Švec**	19 March 1987 (aged 20)		(Czech Republic) Slavia Prague
13	DF	**Martin Klein**	2 July 1984 (aged 22)		(Czech Republic) Teplice
14	FW	**Michal Papadopulos**	14 April 1985 (aged 22)		(Germany) Bayer Leverkusen
15	MF	**František Rajtoral**	12 March 1986 (aged 21)		(Czech Republic) Baník Ostrava
16	GK	Josef Kubásek	6 May 1985 (aged 22)		(Czech Republic) Baník Sokolov
17	DF	**Jiří Kladrubský**	19 November 1985 (aged 21)		(Czech Republic) Dynamo České Budějovice
18	FW	Jan Kysela	17 December 1985 (aged 21)		(Czech Republic) Mladá Boleslav
19	FW	**Martin Fillo**	7 February 1986 (aged 21)		(Czech Republic) Viktoria Plzeň
20	MF	Filip Rýdel	30 March 1984 (aged 23)		(Czech Republic) Sigma Olomouc
21	DF	Milan Kopic	23 November 1984 (aged 22)		(Czech Republic) Mladá Boleslav
22	FW	**Jan Blažek**	20 March 1988 (aged 19)		(Czech Republic) Slovan Liberec
23	GK	Milan Švenger	6 July 1986 (aged 20)		(Czech Republic) Zenit Čáslav

=== England ===
Head coach: Stuart Pearce

No.	Pos.	Player	Date of birth (age)	Caps	Goals	Club
1	GK	**Scott Carson**	3 September 1985 (aged 21)	25	0	(The Football Association) Liverpool
2	DF	**Justin Hoyte**	20 November 1984 (aged 22)	14	1	(The Football Association) Arsenal
3	DF	**Leighton Baines**	11 December 1984 (aged 22)	12	1	(The Football Association) Wigan Athletic
4	DF	Steven Taylor	23 January 1986 (aged 21)	15	4	(The Football Association) Newcastle United
5	DF	Anton Ferdinand	18 February 1985 (aged 22)	16	0	(The Football Association) West Ham United
6	DF	**Gary Cahill**	19 December 1985 (aged 21)	2	0	(The Football Association) Aston Villa
7	MF	Nigel Reo-Coker	14 May 1984 (aged 23)	19	1	(The Football Association) West Ham United
8	MF	**David Bentley**	27 August 1984 (aged 22)	8	4	(The Football Association) Blackburn Rovers
9	MF	**Kieran Richardson**	21 October 1984 (aged 22)	9	1	(The Football Association) Manchester United
10	FW	**David Nugent**	2 May 1985 (aged 22)	10	3	(The Football Association) Preston North End
11	MF	**Ashley Young**	9 July 1985 (aged 21)	7	0	(The Football Association) Aston Villa
12	MF	Wayne Routledge	7 January 1985 (aged 22)	10	1	(The Football Association) Tottenham Hotspur
13	GK	**Joe Hart**	19 April 1987 (aged 20)	2	0	(The Football Association) Manchester City
14	DF	Liam Rosenior	9 July 1984 (aged 22)	6	0	(The Football Association) Fulham
15	MF	**James Milner**	4 January 1986 (aged 21)	24	2	(The Football Association) Newcastle United
16	FW	Leroy Lita	28 December 1984 (aged 22)	5	3	(The Football Association) Reading
17	MF	**Tom Huddlestone**	28 December 1986 (aged 20)	16	1	(The Football Association) Tottenham Hotspur
18	MF	Mark Noble	8 May 1987 (aged 20)	1	0	(The Football Association) West Ham United
19	FW	Matt Derbyshire	14 April 1986 (aged 21)	2	1	(The Football Association) Blackburn Rovers
20	DF	Nedum Onuoha	12 November 1986 (aged 20)	4	0	(The Football Association) Manchester City
21	FW	James Vaughan	14 July 1988 (aged 18)	0	0	(The Football Association) Everton
22	GK	Ben Alnwick	1 January 1987 (aged 20)	0	0	(The Football Association) Tottenham Hotspur
23	MF	Peter Whittingham	8 September 1984 (aged 22)	16	3	(Football Association of Wales) Cardiff City

Statistics up to and including England 5–0 Slovakia, 5 June 2007.

David Bentley was named in the squad, but on 7 June, after the closing date for squad announcements, withdrew citing exhaustion, leaving England with a squad of 22.

=== Italy ===
Head coach: Pierluigi Casiraghi

No.	Pos.	Player	Date of birth (age)	Caps	Goals	Club
1	GK	Gianluca Curci	12 July 1985 (aged 21)			(Italian Football Federation) Roma
2	DF	Marco Andreolli	10 June 1986 (aged 21)			(Italian Football Federation) Internazionale
3	DF	**Giorgio Chiellini** (c)	14 August 1984 (aged 22)			(Italian Football Federation) Juventus
4	MF	**Antonio Nocerino**	9 April 1985 (aged 22)			(Italian Football Federation) Piacenza
5	DF	Andrea Mantovani	22 June 1984 (aged 22)			(Italian Football Federation) Chievo
6	DF	**Marco Motta**	14 May 1986 (aged 21)			(Italian Football Federation) Udinese
7	MF	**Riccardo Montolivo**	18 January 1985 (aged 22)			(Italian Football Federation) Fiorentina
8	MF	**Alberto Aquilani**	7 July 1984 (aged 22)			(Italian Football Federation) Roma
9	FW	**Giampaolo Pazzini**	2 August 1984 (aged 22)			(Italian Football Federation) Fiorentina
10	MF	**Alessandro Rosina**	31 January 1984 (aged 23)			(Italian Football Federation) Torino
11	FW	**Giuseppe Rossi**	1 February 1987 (aged 20)			(The Football Association) Manchester United
12	GK	**Emiliano Viviano**	1 December 1985 (aged 21)			(Italian Football Federation) Brescia
13	DF	Andrea Coda	25 April 1985 (aged 22)			(Italian Football Federation) Udinese
14	DF	**Domenico Criscito**	30 December 1986 (aged 20)			(Italian Football Federation) Juventus
15	DF	Michele Canini	5 June 1985 (aged 22)			(Italian Football Federation) Cagliari
16	MF	Daniele Dessena	10 May 1987 (aged 20)			(Italian Football Federation) Parma
17	DF	Andrea Raggi	24 June 1984 (aged 22)			(Italian Football Federation) Empoli
18	MF	Simone Padoin	18 March 1984 (aged 23)			(Italian Football Federation) Vicenza
19	FW	**Graziano Pellè**	15 July 1985 (aged 21)			(Italian Football Federation) Lecce
20	FW	**Raffaele Palladino**	17 April 1984 (aged 23)			(Italian Football Federation) Juventus
21	MF	Andrea Lazzari	3 December 1984 (aged 22)			(Italian Football Federation) Atalanta
22	GK	Andrea Consigli	27 January 1987 (aged 20)			(Italian Football Federation) Atalanta
23	MF	Luca Cigarini	20 June 1986 (aged 20)			(Italian Football Federation) Parma

=== Serbia ===
Head coach: Miroslav Đukić

No.	Pos.	Player	Date of birth (age)	Caps	Goals	Club
1	GK	**Damir Kahriman**	19 November 1985 (aged 21)			(Football Association of Serbia) Vojvodina
2	DF	**Branislav Ivanović**	22 February 1984 (aged 23)			(Russian Football Union) Lokomotiv Moscow
3	DF	**Antonio Rukavina**	26 January 1984 (aged 23)			(Football Association of Serbia) Partizan
4	DF	**Nemanja Rnić**	30 September 1984 (aged 22)			(Football Association of Serbia) Partizan
5	MF	**Gojko Kačar**	26 January 1987 (aged 20)			(Football Association of Serbia) Vojvodina
6	DF	**Aleksandar Kolarov**	10 November 1985 (aged 21)			(Football Association of Serbia) OFK Beograd
7	MF	**Milan Smiljanić**	19 November 1986 (aged 20)			(Football Association of Serbia) Partizan
8	FW	**Boško Janković**	1 March 1984 (aged 23)			(Royal Spanish Football Federation) Mallorca
9	FW	Đorđe Rakić	31 October 1985 (aged 21)			(Football Association of Serbia) OFK Beograd
10	MF	**Dejan Milovanović**	21 January 1984 (aged 23)			(Football Association of Serbia) Red Star Belgrade
11	DF	**Duško Tošić**	19 January 1985 (aged 22)			(French Football Federation) Sochaux
12	GK	Igor Stefanović	17 July 1987 (aged 19)			(Football Association of Serbia) Zemun
13	DF	**Nikola Drinčić**	7 September 1984 (aged 22)			(Russian Football Union) Amkar Perm
14	FW	**Stefan Babović**	7 January 1987 (aged 20)			(Football Association of Serbia) OFK Beograd
15	MF	Predrag Pavlović	19 June 1986 (aged 20)			(Football Association of Serbia) Napredak Kruševac
16	MF	Đorđe Ivelja	30 June 1984 (aged 22)			(Football Association of Serbia) OFK Beograd
17	FW	**Miloš Krasić**	1 November 1984 (aged 22)			(Russian Football Union) CSKA Moscow
18	FW	**Dragan Mrđa**	23 January 1984 (aged 23)			(Royal Belgian Football Association) Lierse
19	MF	**Dušan Basta**	18 August 1984 (aged 22)			(Football Association of Serbia) Red Star Belgrade
20	DF	**Slobodan Rajković**	3 February 1989 (aged 18)			(Football Association of Serbia) OFK Beograd
21	MF	**Zoran Tošić**	18 January 1987 (aged 20)			(Football Association of Serbia) Banat Zrenjanin
22	DF	Nikola Petković	31 January 1984 (aged 23)			(Football Association of Serbia) Vojvodina
23	GK	Aleksandar Kesić	18 August 1987 (aged 19)			(Football Association of Serbia) Mladost Apatin
