= Zebić =

Zebić (Serbian Cyrillic: Зебић) is a surname. Notable people with the surname include:

- Dalibor Zebić (born 1972), Croatian footballer and manager
- Maja Zebić (born 1982), Croatian handballer
- Zlatko Zebić (born 1979), Serbian footballer
