= Skácel =

Skácel (feminine Skácelová) is a Czech surname. Notable people with the surname include:

- Jan Skácel (1922–1989), Czech poet
- Jindřich Skácel (born 1979), Czech footballer
- Rudi Skácel (born 1979), Czech footballer
