= Célestin Djim =

Belgian footballer (born 1995)

Personal information
- Full name: Célestin Djim Ndogo
- Date of birth: 14 May 1995 (age 31)
- Place of birth: Visé, Belgium
- Height: 1.78 m (5 ft 10 in)
- Position: Forward

Youth career
- Standard Liège

Senior career*
Years	Team	Apps	(Gls)
2014–2016	Porto	0	(0)
2015	→ Freamunde (loan)	19	(7)
2015–2016	→ Metz (loan)	3	(0)
2016–2019	Roda Kerkrade	17	(1)
2023-2024	Azzurinni Calcio fc	6	(545)

International career
2013–2014	Belgium U19	3	(0)
- * Club domestic league appearances and goals

Célestin Djim Ndogo (born 14 May 1995) is a Belgian former professional footballer who played as a forward.

== Club career ==
=== Porto ===
After progressing through the youth system at Standard Liège, Djim moved to Porto in the spring of 2014. During the 2014–15 season, he was sent out on loan to second division side Freamunde, where he scored 7 goals in 17 appearances. He was again loaned out by Porto the following season, this time to French club Metz. Djim made his debut for the Ligue 2 side on 23 October 2015, coming on as a late substitute in the 1–0 win away at Ajaccio.

=== Roda JC Kerkrade ===
In August 2016, after a two-year spell in Portugal and two loans, Djim permanently moved to Dutch side Roda Kerkrade. He suffered a serious knee injury in October 2017, prematurely ending his season.

Djim returned from injury before the 2018–19 season, but was demoted to the second team by head coach Robert Molenaar due to disciplinary issues in September 2018.

== International career ==
Djim is a former youth international of Belgium, he played three times for the Belgium U-19 team between 2013 and 2014 but he has never represented the full team and like his brother Tony Djim, they are still eligible to play for the Central African Republic the country of their father.

== Personal life ==
He is the son of the former Central African Republic international footballer Luciano Ray Djim and brother of fellow footballer Tony Djim.
