= Tony Djim =

Belgian footballer

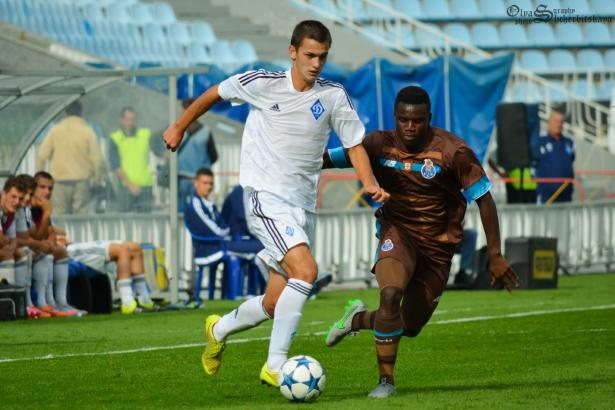
- Djim (right) in 2015

Personal information
- Full name: Tony De Beatidi Djim
- Date of birth: 13 January 1997 (age 29)
- Place of birth: Visé, Belgium
- Height: 1.71 m (5 ft 7 in)
- Position: Forward

Team information
- Current team: FC Cosmos Koblenz
- Number: 17

Youth career
- 2013–2014: Standard Liège
- 2014–2016: Porto

Senior career*
Years	Team	Apps	(Gls)
2015–2020	Porto B	42	(7)
2024–	FC Cosmos Koblenz	28	(17)

International career^{‡}
2015–2016	Belgium U19	11	(1)
- * Club domestic league appearances and goals as of 17 November 2015 (UTC) ‡ National team caps and goals as of 09:42, 2 April 2016 (UTC)

Tony De Beatidi Djim (born 13 January 1997), simply known as Tony Djim, is a Belgian professional footballer who plays as a forward for German club FC Cosmos Koblenz.

== Club career ==
=== Porto B ===
After progressing through the youth system at Standard Liège, Tony moved with his brother Célestin Djim to Porto in the summer of 2014. Tony is described as a fast and physically strong attacker. In the 2019–20 season, his last for the Portuguese club, he scored 3 goals in 10 matches, before the league ended because of coronavirus pandemic in Portugal. Djim officially leaves Porto in June 2020, after six years at the club.

=== Cosmos Koblenz ===
After four years without a club due to various circumstances (COVID complications, and a knee injury) 27-year-old Djim resumes his career by signing a one-year contract with Rheinlandliga club FC Cosmos Koblenz.

== International career ==
Tony is a former youth international of Belgium, he played eleven times for the Belgium U-19 team, scoring one goal against Sweden U-19 and providing three assists between 2015 and 2016. He and his brother, Célestin Djim, are still eligible to play for the Central African Republic, the country of their father.

== Personal life ==
He is the son of the former Central African Republic international footballer Luciano Ray Djim and brother of fellow footballer Célestin Djim.
