= Carlos Pérez Soto =

Chilean philosopher (born 1954)

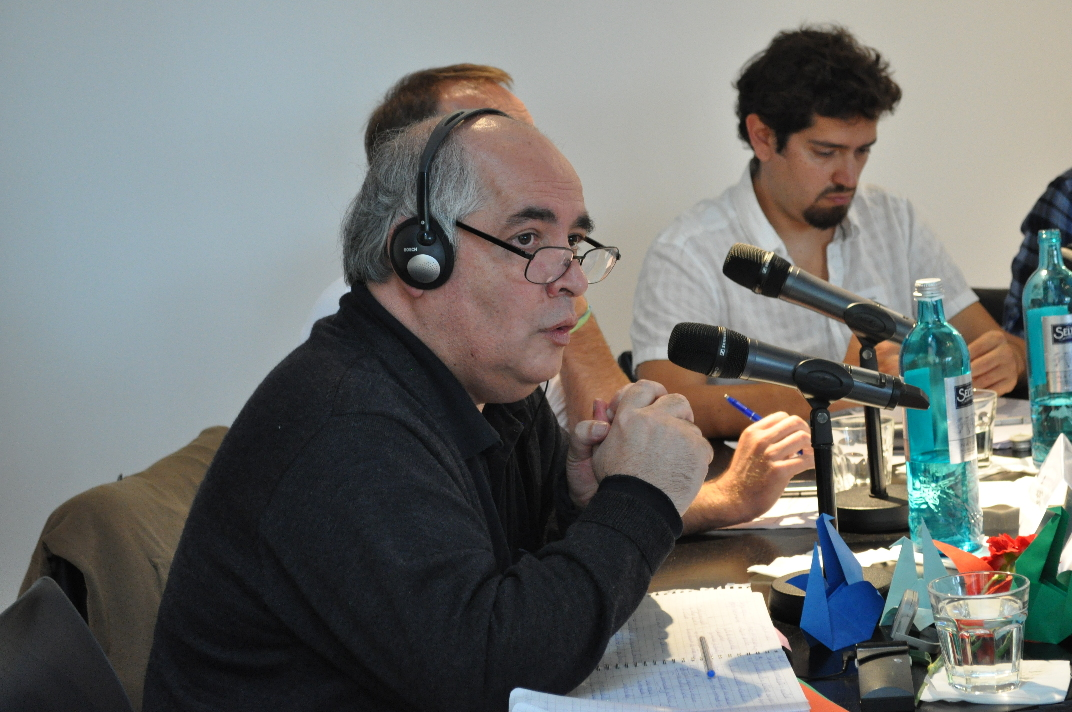
- Carlos Pérez Soto in a seminar in Germany.

Personal details
- Born: 6 October 1954 (age 71) Santiago, Chile
- Education: University of Chile (BA)
- Occupation: Thinker; Writer
- Profession: Teacher of Physics

Carlos Pérez Soto (born 6 October 1954) is a Chilean teacher of physics, lecturer at various universities and a social sciences researcher. He is the author of several works covering a wide range of topics: philosophy of science and epistemology, political philosophy and Marxism, Dance History, anti-psychiatry.

In 2017, he was a militant of the Autonomist Movement (MA), organization then member of the left-wing coalition Broad Front. He left the MA in mid-2018 before its merger into Social Convergence in November of that year.

== Biography ==
In 1972 he joined the Faculty of Education at the University of Chile for the career of Pedagogy in Physics. In 1979, he obtained the state degree of a Government Authorized Teacher of Physics, which is his only formal academic degree. Although he began studying in the heyday of the student movement's political activity during the government of Salvador Allende, he spent most of his student life during the years of the Chilean military dictatorship.

Between 1975 and 1999, he worked as a secondary school teacher of physics in schools and colleges of Santiago.

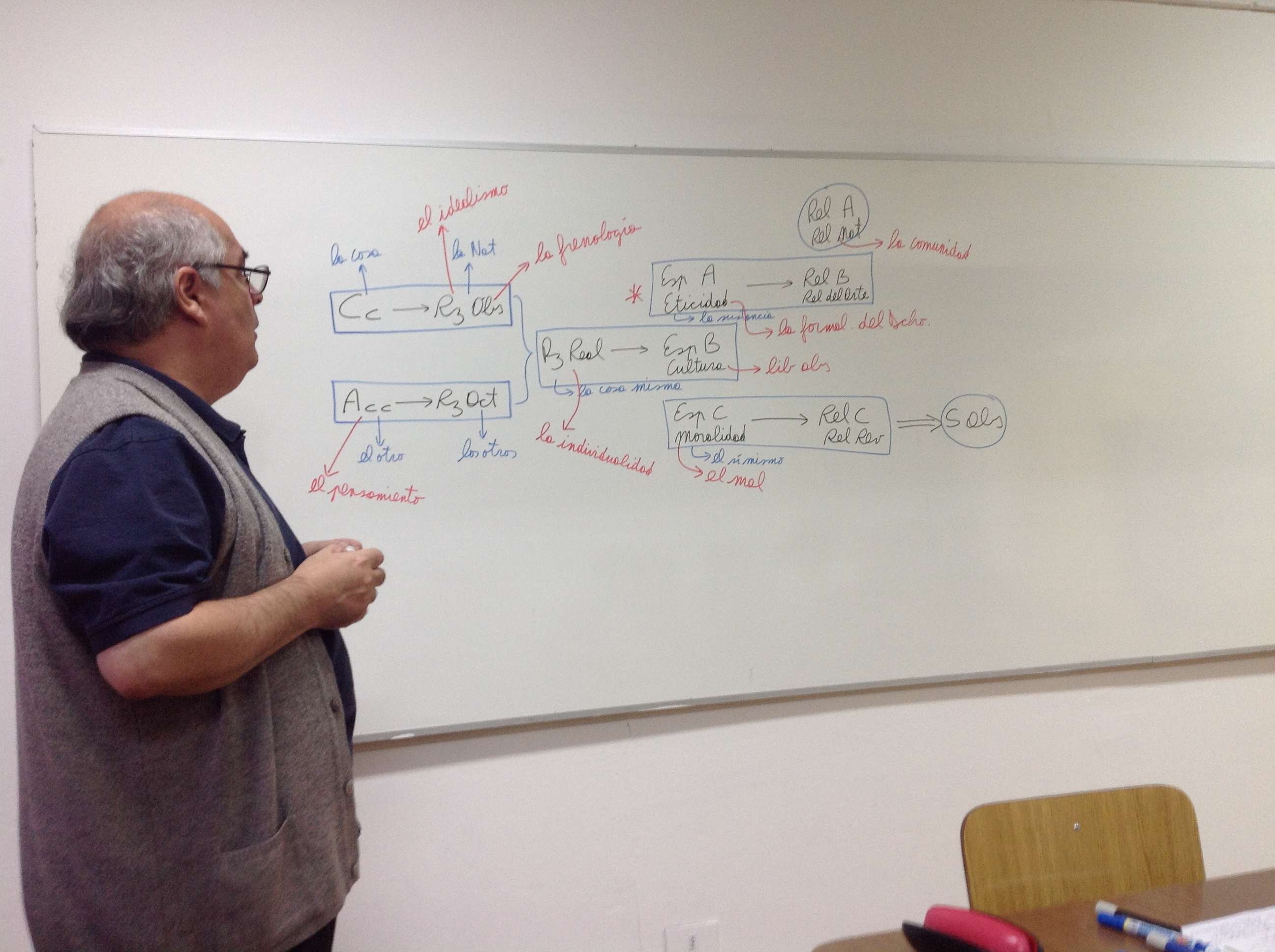
Carlos Pérez Soto teaches a class on Hegel's Phenomenology of Spirit

In 1984, he began teaching in higher education at the Institute of Arts and Social Sciences, which brought together intellectuals opposed to Pinochet's dictatorship and which, as of 1991, became known as ARCIS. He continued his career as a university professor, teaching epistemology and philosophy of science in psychology departments, first at the Diego Portales University and later at the University of Chile. In the late 1980s, he already started to become widely known among students and scholars for his critical approach, his Marxist analysis and concrete policy proposals. In this context, he received invitations to give lectures and conferences at numerous Chilean universities, so that the following years were characterized by an intense teaching activity.

In the last decade, he has taught regular courses and elective seminars at the University of Chile (Faculty of Law), at the Catholic University of Valparaiso (School of Psychology), the Andrés Bello National University (School of Sociology), at University of Santiago (Department of Philosophy), Academy of Christian Humanism University (Dance School) and at the Finis Terrae University (School of Theatre).

In the late 1990s he also started giving some seminars and conferences outside Chile, at the Autonomous University of Barcelona on Hegel (1997) and Marxism (1999), as well as in Cali, at the Universidad del Valle on epistemology and dialectics (1998).

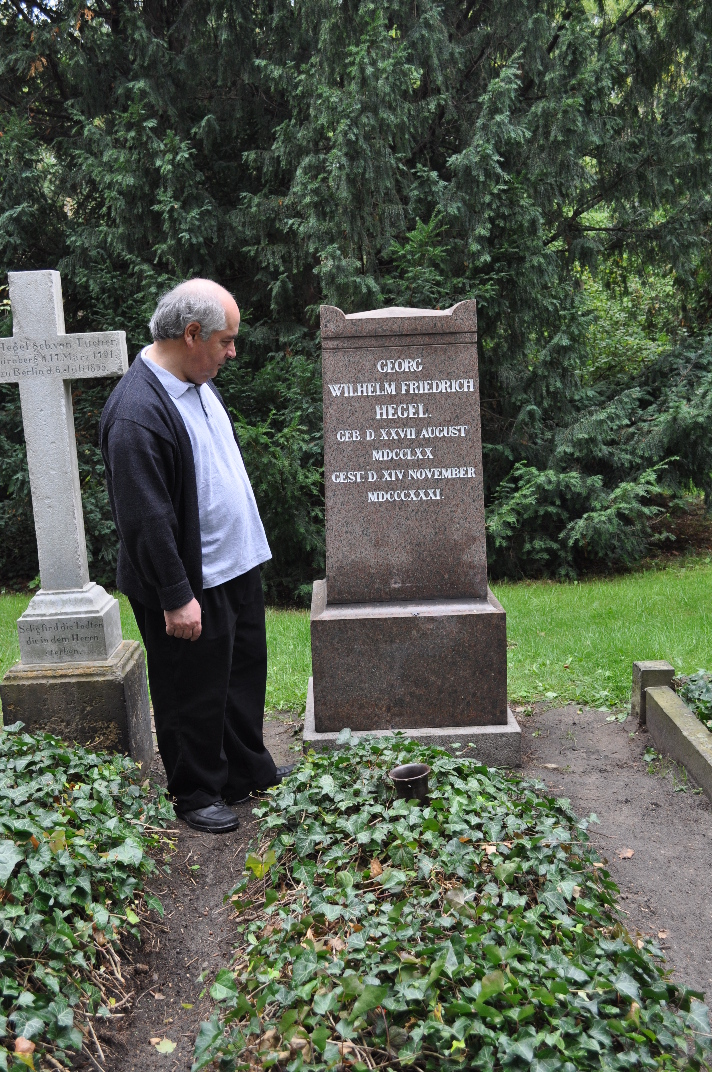
Pérez Soto by Hegel's tomb in Berlin

At the ARCIS University, where he focused his academic work, besides serving as senior researcher at the Center for Social Research and as a Coordinator of Academic Informatics, he taught regular courses at the School of Psychology (Psychological Theories and Systems) and the School of Sociology (Epistemology; Classics of social thought - Marx, science, technology and society), Philosophy (Philosophy of Science), Political Science (Theory of power and the State) and Pedagogy of Dance (Dance History).

As a Marxist intellectual, he has often been interviewed by the leftist press, mainly because he has made relevant theoretical contributions to the political discussion. He actively participated in the student movement of 2011 and 2012 providing analysis and proposals to change the Chilean educational model.

His class analysis of neoliberal society has attracted the interest of international organizations which have invited him to lecture on the subject.

Being a scholar of Hegel and of the reception of Hegel and Marx at the Frankfurt School, particularly of Herbert Marcuse, Carlos Pérez is a regular speaker at international meetings. Since 2009, in addition to the vast educational activity in regular and elective courses at the universities, he has been giving a number of free biannual seminars about Hegel's Phenomenology of Spirit, on Marxism and Psychoanalysis, Critical Theory of Law, History of Marxism, Carl Sagan: Introduction to the current natural philosophy.

Since that same year, he also teaches as a professor of epistemology in several graduate programs (masters and doctorates) at the university Andrés Bello and the ARCIS University. In his classes and seminars, he deals with the critical reflection on methodological aspects of the social sciences. He usually presents himself as a teacher of physics, which intends to be "a provocation against the academic establishment", as he himself has declared. The national press, however, prefers to refer to him as "a great epistemologist".

Since 2013, he has decided to publish his books under a Creative Commons license CC BY-NC-ND (which allows you to copy and distribute the texts freely and at no costs, provided that the source is mentioned; the works can't be altered or used for commercial purposes).

== Theoretical contribution and main ideas ==
In epistemology, he has developed a historical and dialectical analysis of the concept of science, more precisely:

- The development of the idea that the scientific method should be considered a logic to confer legitimacy to the scientific community;
- the proposal to rationally reconstruct the history of philosophy of science, in order to enable criticism of the claim to truth which is implied in the scientific method;
- the development of a historical concept of science based on a Marxist critique of Paul Feyerabend's epistemological anarchism;
- the formulation of a critique of the prevailing public middle class subjectivity, emanating from a historical and social concept of modern psychology.

From a political point of view, Carlos Pérez bases his theoretical approach and practical proposals in "Hegelian Marxism", a standpoint which, as he points out, could become the philosophical foundation towards the emergence of a new type of Marxism. In this regard, the following contributions stand out:

- The idea that bureaucracy should be considered a social class in the Marxist sense of the term;
- a Marxist critique of the ruling regime in socialist countries based on the notion of bureaucracy as a social class;
- an analysis of the process of objective bureaucratization occurred in advanced capitalism;
- a proposal for the reconstruction of Marxist theory based on a materialist reading of Hegel's philosophy.

His propositions for a new anti-psychiatry constitute a political program as well. They focus on a profound critique of the psychiatric practices, on the need for an de-medicalization and de-privatization of the symptoms, in order to bring the issues back to the actual field of their causation, origins and perpetuation: the social sphere. Among other differences with the anti-psychiatry postulates of the twentieth century ( Laing, Cooper or Basaglia), the "new" anti-psychiatry promoted by Pérez Soto also overcomes the paternalistic aspects of the notion of psychiatric hospitals as "shelter homes". It also goes beyond the organization of a more humane or better quality psychiatric care, giving way to an anti-psychiatry that emerges from the affected people themselves. Besides summarizing and illustrating the historical interconnection between the different stages of critical psychiatry and anti-psychiatry, Carlos Pérez makes two particular contributions can be highlighted:

- A critique of the medicalization processes of behavioral disorders;
- the proposal of distinctions when it comes to criticizing the medicalization and commodification of modern medicine.

The following contributions in the field of art and dance are relevant:

- His proposal of a theoretically founded reconstruction of the history of European modern dance throughout the twentieth century;
- his proposal of technical differentiation of style in contemporary dance;
- his theoretical distinctions regarding political art, the political use of art and the particular politics of the artistic sector.

With his second book Comentar obras de danza (Discussing Works of Dance), he finalized his excursion through the history of dance. As he explains, because he wanted to return to the core of his analyses.

I usually write about Marxism, that's the center of all my reflections. From there I ventured into epistemology and philosophy of science, critical psychology and anti-psychiatry. From now on, I will probably write more about Hegelian philosophy, to which I have dedicated many years of study. Except for the most general subjects of aesthetics and art history, for me this book marks the end of a period, and a farewell. Pérez Soto, C. Comentar obras de danza, p. 244, February 2012

== Works ==
=== Books ===
- Sobre la condición social de la psicología (On the social condition of psychology). 1st edition, ARCIS - LOM, Santiago, October 1996, 2nd extended edition LOM, Santiago, 2009, ISBN 978-956-00-0108-5
- Epistemología de la ciencia (Epistemology of science). Published by Instituto de Educación y Pedagogía, Universidad del Valle, Santiago de Cali, Colombia, March 1998,
- Sobre un concepto histórico de ciencia (On a historical concept of science). 1st edition, ARCIS - LOM, Santiago, October 1998, 2nd revised edition, LOM, Santiago, July 2008, ISBN 956282991X, 978-956-282-991-5
- Comunistas otra vez, para una crítica del poder burocrático (Being communists again, towards a critique of bureaucratic power). 1st edition, ARCIS - LOM, Santiago, 2001, 2nd revised edition, LOM, Santiago, July 2008, ISBN 978-956-282-988-5
- Sobre Hegel (On Hegel). 1st edition, Editorial Palinodia, Santiago, 2006, 2nd revised edition, LOM, Santiago, 2010, ISBN 956843805X, 978-956-843-805-0
- Proposición de un marxismo hegeliano (Proposal of a Hegelian Marxism). 1st edition, Editorial Universidad ARCIS, Santiago, 2008. 2nd revised and extended edition, published on the Internet under a Creative Commons license, 2013
- Proposiciones en torno a la historia de la danza (Propositions around the history of dance). Editorial LOM, Santiago, 2008, ISBN 9560000071, 978-956-00-0007-1
- Desde Hegel, para una crítica radical de las ciencias sociales (From Hegel, towards a radical critique of the social sciences). Editorial Itaca, Mexico City, Mexico, 2008, ISBN 9689325116, 978-968-93-2511-6
- Una nueva antipsiquiatría (A new anti-psychiatry). Editorial LOM, Santiago, 2012, ISBN 978-956-00-0361-4
- Comentar obras de danza (Discussing works of dance). Published on the Internet under a Creative Commons license, 2013
- Marxismo y movimiento popular (Marxism and popular movement). Published on the Internet under a Creative Commons license, 2013

=== Articles (selection) ===
- En defensa de un marxismo hegeliano (In defense of a Hegelian Marxism), in Chilean edition of Actuelle Marx, ARCIS, 2003 (Paper presented to the Congress Kommunismus, at the Goethe University Frankfurt, Germany, in November 2003)
- La danza como forma artística (Dance as a form of art), Revista Aisthesis Nº 43, Instituto de Estética, Universidad Católica de Chile, julio de 2008
- Derecho a la violencia y violencia del derecho (The right to violence and the violence of the law), Revista Derecho y Humanidades N° 20, Facultad de Derecho, Universidad de Chile, 2012. Publicado en Brasil en la revista Arma da Critica, N° 4, diciembre de 2012, indexada en Latindex.
- Vaguedad en el realismo jurídico (The vagueness of legal realism), Revista Derecho y Humanidades N° 19, Facultad de Derecho, Universidad de Chile, 2012
