= William Anane =

Ghanaian association football player

Personal information
- Full name: William Anane Agyei
- Date of birth: 17 November 1979 (age 46)
- Place of birth: Ghana
- Position: Forward

Senior career*
Years	Team	Apps	(Gls)
20xx-2003	FV Bad Vilbel	44+	(13+)
2002	Esteghlal Rasht F.C.		
2003-2004	1. FC Eschborn	26	(2)
2004-2005	Eintracht Frankfurt II	29	(17)
2005-2007	FC Senec		
2007	FC Ingolstadt 04	6	(0)
2007-2008	SV Sandhausen	12	(2)
	Sportfreunde Siegen	19	(4)
2009-2010	Rot-Weiss Frankfurt		
2010-2011	Hòa Phát Hà Nội F.C.		
2011-2012	VfB Unterliederbach		
2012-2014	Türk Gücü Friedberg		
2014-201x	SKV Beienheim		
- * Club domestic league appearances and goals

William Anane (born 17 November 1979 in Ghana) is a Ghanaian retired footballer who last played for SKV Beienheim.

== Career ==
Anane started his senior career with FV Bad Vilbel. In 2005, he signed for Senec in the Slovak Super Liga, where he scored four goals. After that, he played for German clubs Ingolstadt 04, SV Sandhausen, Sportfreunde Siegen, Rot-Weiss Frankfurt, Vietnamese club Hòa Phát Hà Nội, and German clubs VfB Unterliederbach, Türk Gücü Friedberg, and SKV Besenheim before retiring.
