= Tomáš Čáp =

Czech footballer

Personal information
- Date of birth: 21 November 1978 (age 47)
- Place of birth: Hranice na Moravě, Czechoslovakia
- Height: 1.74 m (5 ft 9 in)
- Position: Midfielder

Youth career
- SK Hranice

Senior career*
Years	Team	Apps	(Gls)
2001–2004	Jablonec 97	41	(0)
2004–2006	Mladá Boleslav	36	(1)
2006–2008	Kladno	39	(2)
2008	Kärnten	14	(1)
2009	Vítkovice	15	(2)
2009–2010	Senica	10	(1)
- * Club domestic league appearances and goals as of 1 June 2008

Tomáš Čáp (born 21 November 1978 in Hranice na Moravě) is a Czech footballer. In Austria, Čáp played for the Kärnten in the 3rd Division, called "Regionalliga Mitte", from 18 July 2008. His contract finished 3 March 2009.
