= Luciano Ray Djim =

Central African Republic footballer

Personal information
- Date of birth: 3 August 1977 (age 49)
- Place of birth: Bangui, Central African Republic
- Height: 1.77 m (5 ft 10 in)
- Position: Forward

Senior career*
Years	Team	Apps	(Gls)
1996	SC Bangui	26	(12)
1996–2001	Charleroi	59	(5)
2001–2002	Louviére	27	(5)
2002–2004	Visé	18	(1)
2004–2005	Namur	26	(9)
2005–2006	VfR Mannheim	14	(5)
2006–2008	FC Senec	32	(8)
2008–2011	Sérésien		
2011–2014	R.F.C. Tilleur-Saint-Gilles		

International career
1996–2000	Central African Republic		
- * Club domestic league appearances and goals

Luciano Ray Djim (born 3 August 1978) is a Central African Republic former professional footballer who played as a forward.

== Personal life ==
He is the father of fellow professional footballers Célestin Djim and Tony Djim.
