= Lukáš Bodeček =

Czech footballer

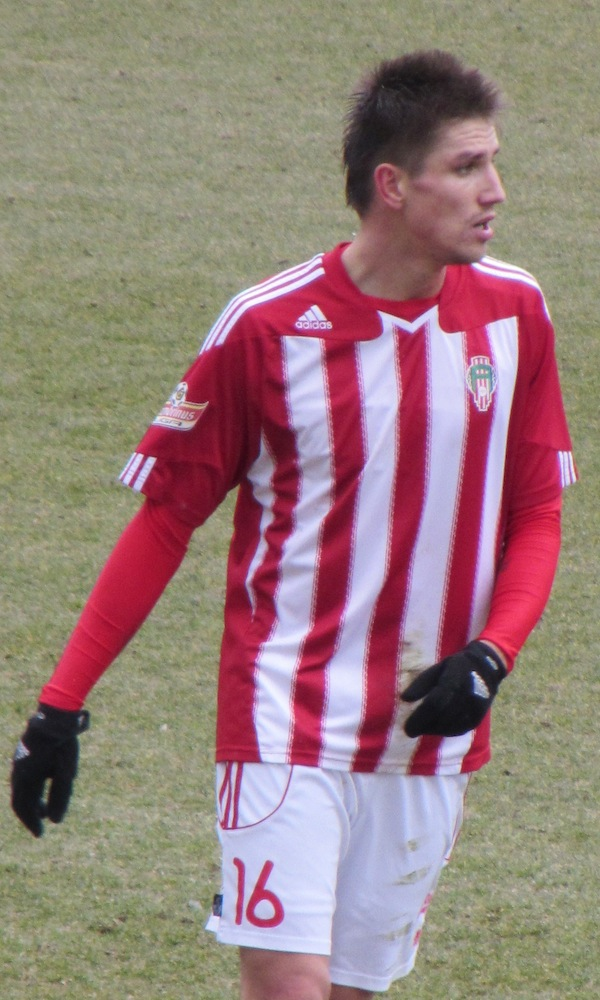

Personal information
- Date of birth: 25 April 1988 (age 38)
- Place of birth: Czechoslovakia
- Height: 1.95 m (6 ft 5 in)
- Position: Defender

Team information
- Current team: Slavia Prague (fitness coach)

Senior career*
| Years | Team | Apps | (Gls) |
| 2007–2010 | Sigma Olomouc | 1 | (0) |
| 2008 | Vysočina Jihlava (loan) | 1 | (0) |
| 2009 | DAC Dunajská Streda | 10 | (0) |
| 2010 | Baník Most | 10 | (0) |
| 2010–2014 | Viktoria Žižkov | 74 | (1) |
| 2015 | Sokol Nové Strašecí | | |
| 2016 | FK SEKO Louny | 6 | (0) |
| 2016 | Benátky nad Jizerou | | |
| 2016–2017 | SFK Vrchovina | | |
| 2017–2018 | Sokol Čížová | | |
| 2018–XXXX | FK Kosoř | | |
- * Club domestic league appearances and goals

Lukáš Bodeček (born 25 April 1988) is a retired Czech footballer. Besides the Czech Republic, he has also played in Slovakia.

== Career ==
=== Later career ===
In the summer 2017, Bodeček moved to TJ Sokol Čížová. He then moved to FK Kosoř.

In addition, Bodeček also worked as a fitness coach for various of the youth teams at SK Slavia Prague since the summer 2017. As of 2020, he was still in this position at Slavia.
