= Carlos Gil Pérez =

Spanish athletic coach (1931–2009)

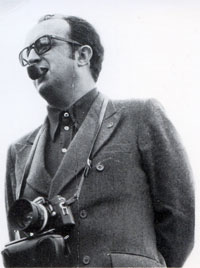
- Born: 28 January 1931; Santiago de Compostela, Galicia, Spain
- Died: 25 December 2009 (aged 78); Salamanca, Spain
- Years active: 1955–2009
- Organization: Royal Spanish Athletics Federation
- Known for: Spanish athletics coach

Carlos Gil Pérez (28 January 1931 – 25 December 2009) was a Spanish athletics coach. From 1979 to 1988, he was Spain's top national coach, serving as the technical director of the Royal Spanish Athletics Federation (RFEA). He has been called "one of the fathers of Spanish athletics."

== Life ==
Pérez was born in Santiago de Compostela, Spain on 28 January 1931. From 1979 to 1988, he held the position of technical director of the Royal Spanish Athletics Federation (RFEA). Under his leadership, Spanish athletics achieved its first Olympic medals at the Moscow Olympics in 1980 and in Los Angeles in 1984.

At the 1982 European Athletics Indoor Championships in Athens, Spain achieved one of its notable milestones by winning five medals.

Pérez also made contributions in the sports administration. Within the RFEA, he revamped the technical infrastructure by introducing experienced coaches, thereby fostering sport development. Additionally, he played a role in initiating athlete support programs, including the creation of ADO scholarships. These scholarships provided financial assistance, offering 80,000 pesetas over four years to athletes with the potential to excel in Olympic Games and top-level championships.

Returning to his hometown, Perez coached the first Salamanca-born national champion in any sport in 1958; under his guidance, José Luis Albarrán claimed the title of Spanish champion in the 200 meters at the Anoeta Stadium in San Sebastián.

In Salamanca, he trained dozens of athletes under his guidance from 1955 to 2009, with notable mentions including his five Olympic athletes: José Luis Albarrán, José Luis Sánchez Paraíso, Rosa Colorado, Antonio Sánchez, and Frutos Feo. They also achieved numerous Spanish records.

In 1968, he received a Silver Medal of the Royal Order of Sports Merit in Salamanca from Juan Antonio Samaranch. In 2007, he received the Silver Medal again from King Juan Carlos I. In 2010, he received the Gold Medal posthumously.

Pérez was frequently seen at the Helmántico Stadium in Salamanca, coaching athletes even at over 70 years old. In his later years, he worked with athletes like Adrián Ingelmo, Ángel García, Saturnino González, David Berrocal, Pedro Ceballos, and Elvis González, among others.

Perez died on 25 December 2009 in Salamanca.

== Sexual misconduct allegations ==
On 7 May 2024, a 57-year-old former discus thrower, under a pseudonym, claimed that Pérez sexually abused him when he was 17 years old. Three other people came forth with similar allegations published in the newspaper El País.

== Works ==
- — (1974). Union Deportiva Salamanca: 1923-1974 [Salamanca Sports Union: 1923-1974] (in Spanish). Salamanca, Spain: Montepio Agrario Salmantino. ISBN 978-84-500-1004-6. OCLC 1142325167.
- — (1977). Velocidades y relevos (in Spanish). Madrid, Spain: Royal Spanish Athletics Federation. ISBN 978-84-500-1939-1. OCLC 969364068.
- — (1978). Pedagogía de la carrera (in Spanish). Valladolid, Spain: Editorial Miñón. ISBN 978-84-355-0491-1. OCLC 991913099.
