= Josef Kubásek =

Czech footballer

Personal information
- Date of birth: 6 May 1985 (age 41)
- Place of birth: Polička, Czechoslovakia
- Height: 1.87 m (6 ft 2 in)
- Position: Goalkeeper

Team information
- Current team: FK Mladá Boleslav

Youth career
- Sokol Bystré
- FK AS Pardubice

Senior career*
| Years | Team | Apps | (Gls) |
| 2006–2008 | FK Baník Sokolov | | |
| 2008 | → SK Slavia Praha (loan) | 0 | (0) |
| 2008–2010 | FK Mladá Boleslav | 2 | (0) |
| 2009 | → 1. FC Slovácko (loan) | 1 | (0) |
| 2010 | → FK Baník Most (loan) | | |

International career^{‡}
| 2006–2007 | Czech Republic U-21 | 4 | (0) |
- * Club domestic league appearances and goals as of 31 December 2009 ‡ National team caps and goals as of 7 February 2013

Josef Kubásek (born 6 May 1985 in Polička) is a Czech footballer who plays for FK Mladá Boleslav. He has represented his country at under-21 level.
