= Leonardo Ricatti =

Argentine footballer

Personal information
- Full name: Leonardo Adrián Ricatti
- Date of birth: 1 March 1970 (age 56)
- Place of birth: Avellaneda, Argentina
- Position: Forward

Senior career*
Years	Team	Apps	(Gls)
1988–1992	San Lorenzo	2	(0)
1992	Santiago Wanderers		
1993	Slovan Bratislava	3	(0)
1994	Aucas		
1994	Dukla Banská Bystrica	6	(0)
1995–1996	Almirante Brown	9	(1)
1996–1997	Giulianova Calcio	11	(1)
- * Club domestic league appearances and goals

Leonardo Ricatti (born 1 March 1970) is a former Argentine football midfielder who played for clubs in South America and Slovakia.

== Club career ==
Ricatti played for Club Atlético San Lorenzo de Almagro in the Argentine Primera Division and ŠK Slovan Bratislava and Dukla Banská Bystrica in the Slovak Superliga

In 1996, Ricatti was involved in a strange incident when he went on trial with Avellino, then playing in Serie C. Club chairman, Antonio Sibilia, demanded that Ricatti cut his long hair within 24 hours or he would not be offered a contract.
