= Jan Vojáček =

Czech footballer

Personal information
- Date of birth: 28 December 1981 (age 44)
- Place of birth: Olomouc, Czechoslovakia
- Position: Goalkeeper

Senior career*
Years	Team	Apps	(Gls)
1999-2001	SK Sigma Olomouc B		
200x–2006	→ Uničov (loan)		
2006–2007	Sigma Olomouc	18	(0)
2008	Spartak Trnava		
2008–2009	Vysočina Jihlava	26	(0)
2009–2010	Dumbarton	26	(0)
- * Club domestic league appearances and goals

Jan Vojáček (born 28 December 1981) is a Czech retired footballer who now works as a medical doctor at the Institute of Functional Medicine in his home country. He played football as a goalkeeper.

== Career ==
Vojáček was born on 28 December 1981 in Olomouc. He started his senior career with SK Sigma Olomouc, where he made eighteen league appearances and had three clean sheets. Later, he played for Slovak club Spartak Trnava, Czech club Vysočina Jihlava and Scottish club Dumbarton before retiring in 2010.

He signed for Dumbarton in August 2009, extending his contract in December 2009 until the end of the 2009–10 season. He made 26 league appearances for the club, before being released at the end of the season.

In October 2020 dr. Vojáček received silver Erratic Boulder anti-award in category of individuals for year 2019 from Czech Skeptics' Club Sisyfos "for bold redefinition of epigenetics and almost successful rediscovery of the basic curriculum of normal and pathological physiology".
