= Carlos Pérez (radiation oncologist) =

Colombian-born American scientist (1934–2023)

Carlos A. Pérez
- Born: November 10, 1934; Pereira, Colombia
- Died: August 21, 2023 (aged 88); Springfield, Missouri, U.S.
- Education: University of Antioquia
- Medical career
- Profession: Radiation oncologist
- Institutions: Washington University in St. Louis; MD Anderson Cancer Center
- Sub-specialties: Hyperthermia
- Awards: CRILA Gold Medal; Gold Medal of the American College of Radiology; Gold Medal of the American Society for Therapeutic Radiology and Oncology; Janaway Gold Medal of the American Radium Society; Gold Medal of the Spanish Radiation Oncology Society (SEOR); Gold Medal of the Latin American Association of Radiation Oncology (ALATRO); Marie Curie Medal of GEC-European Society of Radiation Oncology; Cancer Fighter Award of the American College of Surgeons

Carlos Alberto Pérez (November 10, 1934, Pereira – August 21, 2023, Springfield, Missouri) was an American radiation oncologist. He is well known for his contributions to the clinical management of patients, especially those with gynecologic tumors and carcinoma of the prostate, the breast and head and neck.

== Biography ==
Carlos Alberto Pérez was born in Pereira, Colombia and earned his medical degree at the University of Antioquia School of Medicine in Medellín. He was a radiation oncology resident at the Mallinckrodt Institute of Radiology, Alvin J. Siteman Cancer Center at Barnes-Jewish Hospital and Washington University School of Medicine and had a one-year fellowship in radiotherapy at MD Anderson Hospital and Tumor Institute.

From 2004, Pérez was a Professor Emeritus in the Department of Radiation Oncology at Mallinckrodt Institute of Radiology. Prior to this he held the position of Director (from 1976) and Chair of the Department of Radiation Oncology at Washington University, and also served as the President of the American Society of Therapeutic Radiation during the 1982 calendar year.

Pérez was a co-founder of the Cancer Information Center (CIC), the first US resource facility of its kind that provides medical information and resources as well as emotional support to cancer patients.

Pérez was awarded the Gold Medal of the American Society for Therapeutic Radiology and Oncology in 1992, the Gold Medal of the American College of Radiology in 1997, the CRILA (Círculo de Radioterapeutas Ibero-Latinoamericanos) Gold Medal in 2000, the Janaway Gold Medal of the American Radium Society in 2005, the Gold Medal of the Spanish Society of Radiation Oncology (SEOR) in 2013 and the Gold Medal of the Latin American Society of Radiation Oncology (ALATRO) in 2013.

Pérez published over 370 scientific articles, over 100 chapters and invited publications. He was co-editor of the most comprehensive text on radiation oncology, Principles and Practice of Radiation Oncology, the 6th Edition, which was published in 2013.

From 2005 Pérez was on the Board of Directors of TomoTherapy Incorporated, until 2011, when the company was purchased by Accuray Inc.

Carlos Pérez died in Springfield, Missouri, on August 21, 2023, at the age of 88.
