= Jindřich Skácel =

Czech footballer

Personal information
- Date of birth: 3 November 1979 (age 47)
- Place of birth: Prostějov, Czechoslovakia
- Height: 2.04 m (6 ft 8 in)
- Position: Goalkeeper

Senior career*
Years	Team	Apps	(Gls)
1997–2003	Sigma Olomouc		
2000–2001	→ Slavia Prague (loan)		
2001	→ Drnovice (loan)	16	(0)
2003–2004	Slavia Prague		
2004	→ Příbram (loan)	2	(0)
2004	→ Drnovice (loan)		
2005	Příbram		
2005	Xaverov		
2005	Brno		
2007	Graffin Vlašim		
2008	ViOn Zlaté Moravce	2	(0)
2008–2009	Mutěnice		
2009–2011	Tescoma Zlín	27	(0)
2011	Slovan Rosice		

International career
1998–1999	Czech Republic U21	14	(0)
1998	Czech Republic B	2	(0)
- * Club domestic league appearances and goals

Jindřich Skácel (born 3 November 1979) is a former Czech football goalkeeper. He made over 50 appearances in the Czech First League. Skácel played international football at under-21 level for Czech Republic U21.

Skácel, who was born in Prostějov, rose to fame as a 17-year-old goalkeeper while playing Czech First League football for SK Sigma Olomouc. During his time at Olomouc, he also appeared for the club in the UEFA Cup. He later went to SK Slavia Prague on a 12-month loan, although he didn't make a first-team league appearance for the club and only played for the reserve team in the third-tier Bohemian Football League.

After four years outside the top flight, Skácel signed a contract with FC ViOn Zlaté Moravce who were playing in the 2007–08 Slovak Superliga.
