= Carlos Pérez (footballer, born 1984) =

Spanish footballer

Personal information
- Full name: Carlos Pérez García
- Date of birth: 14 January 1984 (age 42)
- Place of birth: Albacete, Spain
- Height: 1.77 m (5 ft 10 in)
- Position: Winger

Youth career
- Albacete

Senior career*
Years	Team	Apps	(Gls)
2001–2002	Albacete B	18	(14)
2002	Albacete	5	(0)
2002–2006	Valencia B	32	(2)
2004–2005	→ Espanyol B (loan)	27	(2)
2005–2006	→ Alcoyano (loan)	26	(2)
2007	Eldense	18	(3)
2007	Castelldefels	15	(0)
2008	Alcorcón	11	(2)
2008–2009	Spartak Trnava	5	(0)
2009–2010	La Gineta	27	(5)
2010–2014	Villarrobledo	66	(13)
Total		250	(43)

International career
2002	Spain U20	5	(0)
- * Club domestic league appearances and goals

Carlos Pérez García (born 14 January 1984) is a Spanish former professional footballer who played as a winger.

== Career ==
Born in Albacete, Pérez started his professional career with hometown's Albacete Balompié. His potential was eventually spotted by Valencia's manager Rafael Benítez, who signed the 18-year-old to a five-year contract after he had made five first-team appearances with the Castile-La Mancha club in the second division.

During his stay with the Che, however, Pérez would be often loaned, only amassing a few callups to the main squad and being released for good in January 2007. Subsequently, he resumed his career in the third and fourth levels.

In the 2008 summer, Pérez joined Spartak Trnava in Slovakia for two years, being released after a sole season and going on to compete in Spanish amateur football until his retirement.
