= Josef Kaufman =

Czech footballer (born 1984)

Personal information
- Date of birth: 27 March 1984 (age 42)
- Place of birth: Pardubice, Czechoslovakia
- Height: 1.87 m (6 ft 2 in)
- Position: Defender

Youth career
- 1992–2000: FK Pardubice 1899
- 2000–2002: AS Pardubice

Senior career*
Years	Team	Apps	(Gls)
2002–2004	AS Pardubice	36	(1)
2004–2008	Teplice	88	(1)
2008	→ Viking (loan)	7	(0)
2009–2012	Slavia Prague	21	(2)
2012	→ Spartak Trnava (loan)	10	(1)
2012	→ Zbrojovka Brno (loan)	10	(0)
2013–2014	Teplice	19	(1)
2015–2018	USV Oed/Zeillern		

International career
2002	Czech Republic U18	7	(0)
2002–2003	Czech Republic U19	4	(0)
2003–2007	Czech Republic U21	28	(0)
- * Club domestic league appearances and goals

Josef Kaufman (born 27 March 1984) is a Czech former professional footballer who played as a defender.

== Career ==
Kaufman formerly played in the Gambrinus Liga for FK Teplice before going on loan to Viking FK in 2008. At the beginning of the year 2009 towards the end of the loan in Viking, he decided not to extend his contract with Viking, and signed with Czech league champions Slavia Prague.
