= Milan Švenger =

Czech footballer

Personal information
- Full name: Milan Švenger
- Date of birth: 6 July 1986 (age 40)
- Place of birth: Jablonec nad Nisou, Czechoslovakia
- Height: 1.84 m (6 ft 0 in)
- Position: Goalkeeper

Youth career
- 1992–2004: FK Jablonec
- 2004–2005: Sparta Prague

Senior career*
Years	Team	Apps	(Gls)
2005–2017	Sparta Prague	16	(0)
2006–2007	→ FC Zenit Čáslav (loan)	33	(0)
2007	→ SK Sparta Krč (loan)	11	(0)
2008	→ FK Siad Most (loan)	9	(0)
2008	→ FC Zenit Čáslav (loan)	14	(0)
2012–2013	→ FK Senica (loan)	32	(0)
2013	→ Vlašim (loan)	7	(0)
2014–2015	→ Bohemians 1905 (loan)	17	(0)
2015–2017	→ Příbram (loan)	0	(0)
2017–2018	Zlín	6	(0)
2018–2019	Příbram	13	(0)
2019–2023	Viktoria Žižkov	82	(0)

International career
2006–2008	Czech Republic U21	12	(0)
- * Club domestic league appearances and goals

Milan Švenger (born 6 July 1986) is a Czech retired footballer who played as a goalkeeper. He played for the Czech Republic national U-21 football team.
