= Zlatko Zebić =

Serbian footballer

Personal information
- Full name: Zlatko Zebić
- Date of birth: January 8, 1979 (age 47)
- Place of birth: Loznica, SFR Yugoslavia
- Height: 1.85 m (6 ft 1 in)
- Positions: Attacking midfielder; forward

Team information
- Current team: Chicago Storm
- Number: 10

Youth career
- 1992–1997: Loznica

Senior career*
Years	Team	Apps	(Gls)
1997–1998	Loznica	16	(5)
1998–2002	Parma	1	(0)
1999–2000	→ Young Boys (loan)	24	(5)
2000–2001	→ Spartak Subotica (loan)	20	(5)
2001–2002	→ Bellinzona (loan)	27	(6)
2002–2003	Košice	20	(4)
2003–2005	Varese	35	(5)
2005–2007	Chicago Storm (Indoor)	25	(5)
2007–2009	Rockford Rampage (Indoor)	36	(32)
2009–2010	Chicago Storm (Indoor)	11	(3)
- * Club domestic league appearances and goals

Zlatko Zebić (Serbian Cyrillic: Златко Зебић, born January 8, 1979, in Loznica) is a Serbian retired football player. He also holds American citizenship. His last club was Chicago Storm in the Ultimate Soccer League in the United States.

During his career in Europe, he has played for Serbian clubs FK Loznica, Spartak Subotica, Swiss Young Boys and AC Bellinzona, Slovak Košice and Italian Parma and Varese. After moving to U.S. in 2005, beside playing for Chicago Storm, he has also played with Rockford Rampage.
