= 2003 UEFA Intertoto Cup =

Tournament details
- Dates: 21 June 2003 – 26 August 2003
- Teams: 61

Final positions
- Champions: (Germany) Schalke 04 (Spain) Villarreal (Italy) Perugia

Tournament statistics
- Matches played: 116
- Goals scored: 308 (2.66 per match)

The 2003 UEFA Intertoto Cup finals were won by Schalke 04, Villarreal, and Perugia. All three teams advanced to the UEFA Cup.

== First round ==
Team 1	Agg.	Team 2	1st leg	2nd leg
Pasching (Austria)	2–2 (a)	(Georgia (country)) WIT Georgia	1–0	1–2
Encamp (Andorra)	1–7	(Belgium) Lierse	0–3	1–4
Spartak Trnava (Slovakia)	2–7	(North Macedonia) Pobeda	1–5	1–2
Partizani (Albania)	3–3 (a)	(Israel) Maccabi Netanya	2–0	1–3
Brno (Czech Republic)	3–3 (a)	(Armenia) Kotayk	1–0	2–3
Koper (Slovenia)	3–2	(Croatia) Zagreb	1–0	2–2
Žalgiris (Lithuania)	1–4	(Sweden) Örgryte IS	1–1	0–3
Győr (Hungary)	3–3 (a)	(Cyprus) Ethnikos Achna	1–1	2–2
Videoton (Hungary)	4–5	(Bulgaria) Marek Dupnitsa	2–2	2–3 (a.e.t.)
Odra Wodzisław (Poland)	1–3	(Republic of Ireland) Shamrock Rovers	1–2	0–1
Tampere United (Finland)	2–2 (a)	(Romania) Ceahlăul Piatra Neamț	1–0	1–2
Sutjeska (Serbia and Montenegro)	4–1	Union Luxembourg	3–0	1–1
Bangor City (Wales)	2–6	(Romania) Gloria Bistrița	0–1	2–5
OFK Beograd (Serbia and Montenegro)	5–3	(Estonia) Narva Trans	void	5–3 (a.e.t.)
Dinaburg (Latvia)	1–2	(Switzerland) Wil	1–0	0–2
Polonia Warsaw (Poland)	1–5	(Kazakhstan) Tobol	0–3	1–2
ZTS Dubnica (Slovakia)	7–1	(Cyprus) Olympiakos Nicosia	3–0	4–1
Dacia Chișinău (Moldova)	5–1	(Faroe Islands) GÍ Gøta	4–1	1–0
Sloboda Tuzla (Bosnia and Herzegovina)	2–2 (3–2 p)	(Iceland) KA	1–1	1–1 (a.e.t.)
Shakhtyor Soligorsk (Belarus)	8–1	(Northern Ireland) Omagh Town	1–0	7–1
Allianssi (Finland)	2–1	(Malta) Hibernians	1–0	1–1

=== First leg ===
22 June 2003

Pasching (Austria)	1–0	(Georgia (country)) WIT Georgia
Glieder 65' (pen.)	Report

Schwan-Stadion, Schwanenstadt
Attendance: 820
Referee: Sokol Jareci (Albania)

22 June 2003

Encamp (Andorra)	0–3	(Belgium) Lierse
	Report	Timmermans 8'; Janssens 22'; Raeymaeckers 76'

Estadi Comunal d'Andorra la Vella, Andorra la Vella
Attendance: 250
Referee: Richard Havrilla (Slovakia)

22 June 2003

Spartak Trnava (Slovakia)	1–5	(North Macedonia) Pobeda
Fall 9'	Report	Kapinkovski 5'; Gesoski 15', 28'; Dimitrovski 75'; Gilson 90'

Štadión Antona Malatinského, Trnava
Attendance: 2,198
Referee: Oleh Oriekhov (Ukraine)

21 June 2003

Partizani (Albania)	2–0	(Israel) Maccabi Netanya
Carioca 15'; Kuli 21'	Report

Qemal Stafa Stadium, Tirana
Attendance: 920
Referee: Panayiotis Gerasimou (Cyprus)

21 June 2003

Brno (Czech Republic)	1–0	(Armenia) Kotayk
Došek 4'	Report

Stadion na Lesní ulici, Břeclav
Attendance: 1,321
Referee: Valery Vyalichka (Belarus)

22 June 2003

Koper (Slovenia)	1–0	(Croatia) Zagreb
Jakomin 59'	Report

Bonifika Stadium, Koper
Attendance: 900
Referee: Dietmar Drabek (Austria)

22 June 2003

Žalgiris (Lithuania)	1–1	(Sweden) Örgryte IS
Shilo 55' (pen.)	Report	Mwila 84'

Žalgiris Stadium, Vilnius
Attendance: 196
Referee: Pedro Proença (Portugal)

21 June 2003

Győr (Hungary)	1–1	(Cyprus) Ethnikos Achna
Oross 59'	Report	Chrysafi 45'

Stadion ETO, Győr
Attendance: 700
Referee: Delce Jakimovski (Macedonia)

22 June 2003

Videoton (Hungary)	2–2	(Bulgaria) Marek Dupnitsa
Kóczián 1'; Földes 36'	Report	Stoykov 58' (pen.); Pargov 61'

Stadion Ezsperanto Ut, Dunaújváros
Attendance: 275
Referee: Sergo Kvaratskhelia (Georgia)

21 June 2003

Odra Wodzisław (Poland)	1–2	(Republic of Ireland) Shamrock Rovers
Nowacki 73'	Report	Grant 76', 83'

MOSiR Stadium, Wodzisław Śląski
Attendance: 3,000
Referee: Sead Kulović (Bosnia and Herzegovina)

22 June 2003

Tampere United (Finland)	1–0	(Romania) Ceahlăul Piatra Neamț
Sainio 26'	Report

Ratina Stadion, Tampere
Attendance: 4,300
Referee: Eduard Cichý (Slovakia)

22 June 2003

Sutjeska (Serbia and Montenegro)	3–0	Union Luxembourg
Miković 47'; Krsteski 84' (pen.); Bošković 87'	Report

Gradski stadion, Nikšić
Attendance: 5,100
Referee: Knud Stadsgaard (Denmark)

21 June 2003

Bangor City (Wales)	0–1	(Romania) Gloria Bistrița
	Report	Coroian 60'

Belle Vue, Rhyl
Attendance: 1,062
Referee: Brage Sandmoen (Norway)

21 June 2003

OFK Beograd (Serbia and Montenegro)	6–1	(Estonia) Narva Trans
Stanić 25', 86'; Grubač 66'; Baković 72'; Simić 81', 88'	Report	Kolotsei 59'

Omladinski Stadium, Belgrade
Attendance: 650
Referee: Iain Brines (Scotland)

This game was declared void by UEFA due to fan incident at the stadium with smoke bomb thrown onto the field. The second leg game by itself determined the result of the matchup.

21 June 2003

Dinaburg (Latvia)	1–0	(Switzerland) Wil
Čugunovs 28'	Report

Celtnieks Stadium, Daugavpils
Attendance: 700
Referee: Zbigniew Marczyk (Poland)

22 June 2003

Polonia Warsaw (Poland)	0–3	(Kazakhstan) Tobol
	Report	Mazbaev 23', 72'; Shkurin 49'

Stadion Polonii Warszawa, Warsaw
Attendance: 208
Referee: Mark Whitby (Wales)

21 June 2003

ZTS Dubnica (Slovakia)	3–0	(Cyprus) Olympiakos Nicosia
Švestka 20'; Švikruha 71'; Ševela 80'	Report

Mestský štadión, Dubnica nad Váhom
Attendance: 2,750
Referee: Miroslav Radoman (Serbia and Montenegro)

21 June 2003

Dacia Chișinău (Moldova)	4–1	(Faroe Islands) GÍ Gøta
S. Jăpălău 33'; Golban 47', 85'; Martin 90'	Report	Popczyński 55'

Stadionul Republican, Chișinău
Attendance: 550
Referee: Stefano Podeschi (San Marino)

21 June 2003

Sloboda Tuzla (Bosnia and Herzegovina)	1–1	(Iceland) KA
Muslimović 80' (pen.)	Report	Helgason 81'

Tušanj City Stadium, Tuzla
Attendance: 5,000
Referee: Sergiy Berezka (Ukraine)

21 June 2003

Shakhtyor Soligorsk (Belarus)	1–0	(Northern Ireland) Omagh Town
Tikhonchik 22'	Report

Traktor Stadium, Minsk
Attendance: 955
Referee: Ivan Novak (Croatia)

22 June 2003

Allianssi (Finland)	1–0	(Malta) Hibernians
Adriano 90'	Report

Pohjola Stadion, Vantaa
Attendance: 861
Referee: Mark Courtney (Northern Ireland)

=== Second leg ===
28 June 2003

WIT Georgia (Georgia (country))	2–1	(Austria) Pasching
Melkadze 52', 90'	Report	Horvath 61'

Boris Paichadze National Stadium, Tbilisi
Attendance: 835
Referee: Robert Małek (Poland)

2–2 on aggregate, Pasching won on away goals rule.

29 June 2003

Lierse (Belgium)	4–1	(Andorra) Encamp
Laeremans 7'; Raeymaeckers 11'; Geens 65'; Médard 87'	Report	Congil 19'

Herman Vanderpoortenstadion, Lier
Attendance: 1,224
Referee: Raivo Lattik (Estonia)

Lierse won 7–1 on aggregate.

28 June 2003

Pobeda (North Macedonia)	2–1	(Slovakia) Spartak Trnava
Gilson 39'; Kapinkovski 58'	Report	Kriss 83'

Stadion Goce Delčev, Prilep
Attendance: 3,000
Referee: Kuddusi Müftüoglu (Turkey)

Pobeda won 7–2 on aggregate.

28 June 2003

Maccabi Netanya (Israel)	3–1	(Albania) Partizani
Genish 38'; Hassan 64'; Hadad 80'	Report	Muzaka 16'

Albena Stadium, Albena
Attendance: 200
Referee: Per Ivar Staberg (Norway)

3–3 on aggregate, Partizani won on away goals rule.

28 June 2003

Kotayk (Armenia)	3–2	(Czech Republic) Brno
Voskanyan 45', 89' (pen.); Kocharyan 52'	Report	Pacanda 83'; Simr 90'

Vazgen Sargsyan Republican Stadium, Yerevan
Attendance: 3,000
Referee: José Luis Mengual (Andorra)

3–3 on aggregate, Brno won on away goals rule.

28 June 2003

Zagreb (Croatia)	2–2	(Slovenia) Koper
Đalović 66'; Brunčević 81'	Report	Trenevski 27', 71' (pen.)

Stadion Kranjčevićeva, Zagreb
Attendance: 388
Referee: Andriy Shandor (Ukraine)

Koper won 3–2 on aggregate.

28 June 2003

Örgryte IS (Sweden)	3–0	(Lithuania) Žalgiris
Alves 52'; Paulinho 75', 90'	Report

Ullevi, Gothenburg
Attendance: 1,031
Referee: Lassin Isaksen (Faroe Islands)

Örgryte IS won 4–1 on aggregate.

28 June 2003

Ethnikos Achna (Cyprus)	2–2	(Hungary) Győr
Chatziaros 5', 10'	Report	Varga 45'; Oross 57'

GSZ Stadium, Larnaca
Attendance: 300
Referee: Novo Panić (Bosnia and Herzegovina)

3–3 on aggregate, Győr won on away goals rule.

29 June 2003

Marek Dupnitsa (Bulgaria)	3–2 (a.e.t.)	(Hungary) Videoton
Lubenov 29'; Dionisiev 42'; Mujiri 97'	Report	Földes 48', 61'

Bonchuk Stadium, Dupnitsa
Attendance: 3,000
Referee: Tony Asumaa (Finland)

Marek Dupnitsa won 5–4 on aggregate.

29 June 2003

Shamrock Rovers (Republic of Ireland)	1–0	(Poland) Odra Wodzisław
Fitzpatrick 66'	Report

Richmond Park, Dublin
Attendance: 3,000
Referee: Veaceslav Banari (Moldova)

Shamrock Rovers won 3–1 on aggregate.

29 June 2003

Ceahlăul Piatra Neamț (Romania)	2–1	(Finland) Tampere United
Goian 29'; Alistar 71'	Report	Scheweleff 59'

Stadionul Ceahlăul, Piatra Neamț
Attendance: 2,000
Referee: Damir Skomina (Slovenia)

2–2 on aggregate, Tampere United won on away goals rule.

29 June 2003

Union Luxembourg	1–1	(Serbia and Montenegro) Sutjeska
Baum 46'	Report	Tucaković 37'

Stade Josy Barthel, Luxembourg City
Attendance: 205
Referee: Sergey Tsaregradskiyi (Kazakhstan)

Sutjeska won 4–1 on aggregate.

28 June 2003

Gloria Bistrița (Romania)	5–2	(Wales) Bangor City
Anca 26'; Sânmărtean 56', 85'; Mândrean 64'; Bucuroaia 90'	Report	Evans 19', 90' (pen.)

Stadionul Gloria, Bistrița
Attendance: 1,500
Referee: Adrian Casha (Malta)

Gloria Bistrița won 6–2 on aggregate.

29 June 2003

Narva Trans (Estonia)	3–5 (a.e.t.)	(Serbia and Montenegro) OFK Beograd
Gruznov 5', 44'; Lipartov 38'	Report	Tošić 7'; Kolaković 11' 105'; Kirovski 75' 95'

A. Le Coq Arena, Tallinn
Attendance: 400
Referee: Peter Vervecken (Belgium)

OFK Beograd won 5–3 on aggregate.

29 June 2003

Wil (Switzerland)	2–0	(Latvia) Dinaburg
Callà 22'; Lustrinelli 45'	Report

Stadion Bergholz, Wil
Attendance: 1,550
Referee: Goran Mihaljević (Serbia and Montenegro)

Wil won 2–1 on aggregate.

29 June 2003

Tobol (Kazakhstan)	2–1	(Poland) Polonia Warsaw
Mukanov 74'; Zhumaskaliyev 90'	Report	Jarosiewicz 21'

Kostanay Central Stadium, Kostanay
Attendance: 6,500
Referee: Aleksei Tyumin (Russia)

Tobol won 5–1 on aggregate.

28 June 2003

Olympiakos Nicosia (Cyprus)	1–4	(Slovakia) ZTS Dubnica
Elia 75'	Report	Ševela 21'; Kiška 31', 66'; Dovičovič 37'

GSP Stadium, Nicosia
Attendance: 71
Referee: Craig Thomson (Scotland)

ZTS Dubnica won 7–1 on aggregate.

28 June 2003

GÍ Gøta (Faroe Islands)	0–1	(Moldova) Dacia Chișinău
	Report	Badea 46'

Tórsvøllur, Tórshavn
Attendance: 200
Referee: Luc Wilmes (Luxembourg)

Dacia Chișinău won 5–1 on aggregate.

28 June 2003

KA (Iceland)	1–1 (a.e.t.)	(Bosnia and Herzegovina) Sloboda Tuzla
Sigbjörnsson 55'	Report	Crnogorac 19'
Penalties
Hringsson (penalty missed); Gunnarsson (penalty scored); Sigþórsson (penalty missed); Eiðsson (penalty scored); Guðbjörnsson (penalty missed)	2–3	(penalty scored) Okanović; (penalty missed) Crnogorac; (penalty scored) Nikolić; (penalty missed) Bajrović; (penalty scored) Muslimović

Akureyrarvöllur, Akureyri
Attendance: 850
Referee: Brian Lawlor (Wales)

2–2 on aggregate, Sloboda Tuzla won on penalties.

28 June 2003

Omagh Town (Northern Ireland)	1–7	(Belarus) Shakhtyor Soligorsk
Sproule 41'	Report	Lyavonchyk 2'; Kalachev 4', 25'; Tikhonchik 28'; Novik 52', 68'; Syarohin 57'

Brandywell Stadium, Derry
Attendance: 600
Referee: Bragi Bergmann (Iceland)

Shakhtyor Soligorsk won 8–1 on aggregate.

28 June 2003

Hibernians (Malta)	1–1	(Finland) Allianssi
Mifsud 30'	Report	Simula 50'

Hibernians Stadium, Paola
Attendance: 500
Referee: Cristian Balaj (Romania)

Allianssi won 2–1 on aggregate.

== Second round ==
Team 1	Agg.	Team 2	1st leg	2nd leg
Akratitos (Greece)	0–1	(Finland) Allianssi	0–1	0–0
Örgryte IS (Sweden)	4–4 (a)	(France) Nice	3–2	1–2
Slovácko (Czech Republic)	4–3	(Serbia and Montenegro) OFK Beograd	1–0	3–3
Racing de Santander (Spain)	2–2 (a)	(Hungary) Győr	1–0	1–2
Slovan Liberec (Czech Republic)	4–0	(Republic of Ireland) Shamrock Rovers	2–0	2–0
Thun (Switzerland)	3–4	(Czech Republic) Brno	2–3	1–1
Brescia (Italy)	3–2	(Romania) Gloria Bistrița	2–1	1–1
Marek Dupnitsa (Bulgaria)	1–3	(Germany) Wolfsburg	1–1	0–2
Shakhtyor Soligorsk (Belarus)	3–5	(Croatia) Cibalia	1–1	2–4
Sint-Truiden (Belgium)	0–3	(Kazakhstan) Tobol	0–2	0–1
Willem II (Netherlands)	3–4	(Switzerland) Wil	2–1	1–3
Pobeda (North Macedonia)	2–3	(Austria) Pasching	1–1	1–2
Sloboda Tuzla (Bosnia and Herzegovina)	2–5	(Belgium) Lierse	1–0	1–5
Tampere United (Finland)	1–0	(Serbia and Montenegro) Sutjeska	0–0	1–0
Dacia Chișinău (Moldova)	5–0	(Albania) Partizani	2–0	3–0
Koper (Slovenia)	3–3 (a)	(Slovakia) ZTS Dubnica	1–0	2–3

=== First leg ===
6 July 2003

Akratitos (Greece)	0–1	(Finland) Allianssi
	Report	Adriano 67'

Yiannis Pathiakakis Stadium, Ano Liosia
Attendance: 230
Referee: Goran Marić (Croatia)

5 July 2003

Örgryte IS (Sweden)	3–2	(France) Nice
Paulinho 8' (pen.), 51'; Alves 90'	Report	Cherrad 26', 68'

Ullevi, Gothenburg
Attendance: 1,746
Referee: Jaromír Hlaváč (Czech Republic)

6 July 2003

1. FC Synot (Czech Republic)	1–0	(Serbia and Montenegro) OFK Beograd
Trišović 53' (o.g.)	Report

Stadion Širůch, Staré Město
Attendance: 2,112
Referee: Selçuk Dereli (Turkey)

6 July 2003

Racing de Santander (Spain)	1–0	(Hungary) Győr
Coromina 42'	Report

Campos de Sport de El Sardinero, Santander
Attendance: 4,895
Referee: Anton Genov (Bulgaria)

6 July 2003

Slovan Liberec (Czech Republic)	2–0	(Republic of Ireland) Shamrock Rovers
Zápotočný 12'; Langer 21'	Report

Stadion u Nisy, Liberec
Attendance: 5,100
Referee: Karen Nalbandyan (Armenia)

5 July 2003

Thun (Switzerland)	2–3	(Czech Republic) Brno
Aegerter 42'; Rama 75'	Report	Živný 10'; Zúbek 76'; Pacanda 83'

Stadion Lachen, Thun
Attendance: 2,050
Referee: Kostadin Kostadinov (Bulgaria)

5 July 2003

Brescia (Italy)	2–1	(Romania) Gloria Bistrița
Cortellini 4'; Del Nero 85' (pen.)	Report	Velcea 10'

Stadio Mario Rigamonti, Brescia
Attendance: 6,774
Referee: Nikolai Ivanov (Russia)

5 July 2003

Marek Dupnitsa (Bulgaria)	1–1	(Germany) Wolfsburg
Bibishkov 58'	Report	Klimowicz 24'

Bonchuk Stadium, Dupnitsa
Attendance: 2,500
Referee: Carlos Megía Dávila (Spain)

5 July 2003

Shakhtyor Soligorsk (Belarus)	1–1	(Croatia) Cibalia
Lyavonchyk 45'	Report	Lajtman 79'

Traktor Stadium, Minsk
Attendance: 877
Referee: Attila Ábrahám (Hungary)

6 July 2003

Sint-Truiden (Belgium)	0–2	(Kazakhstan) Tobol
	Report	Mazbaev 35' (pen.); Garkusha 81'

Bergéstadion, Tienen
Attendance: 2,500
Referee: Dragomir Tanović (Serbia and Montenegro)

5 July 2003

Willem II (Netherlands)	2–1	(Switzerland) Wil
Sektioui 9'; Landzaat 70' (pen.)	Report	Callà 32'

Koning Willem II Stadion, Tilburg
Attendance: 2,797
Referee: Levan Paniashvili (Georgia)

5 July 2003

Pobeda (North Macedonia)	1–1	(Austria) Pasching
Gesoski 45'	Report	Kovačević 59'

Stadion Goce Delčev, Prilep
Attendance: 2,500
Referee: Aleh Chykun (Belarus)

5 July 2003

Sloboda Tuzla (Bosnia and Herzegovina)	1–0	(Belgium) Lierse
Kuduzović 90'	Report

Tušanj City Stadium, Tuzla
Attendance: 6,000
Referee: Athanassios Briakos (Greece)

6 July 2003

Tampere United (Finland)	0–0	(Serbia and Montenegro) Sutjeska
	Report

Tammelan Stadion, Tampere
Attendance: 3,482
Referee: Krzysztof Slupik (Poland)

5 July 2003

Dacia Chișinău (Moldova)	2–0	(Albania) Partizani
Golban 61'; Orbu 78'	Report

Stadionul Republican, Chișinău
Attendance: 1,000
Referee: Gerald Lehner (Austria)

5 July 2003

Koper (Slovenia)	1–0	(Slovakia) ZTS Dubnica
Trenevski 90'	Report

Bonifika Stadium, Koper
Attendance: 685
Referee: Aleksandr Gvardis (Russia)

=== Second leg ===
13 July 2003

Allianssi (Finland)	0–0	(Greece) Akratitos
	Report

Pohjola Stadion, Vantaa
Attendance: 2,662
Referee: Eric Blareau (Belgium)

Allianssi won 1–0 on aggregate.

12 July 2003

Nice (France)	2–1	(Sweden) Örgryte IS
Pamarot 8'; Meslin 22'	Report	Aubynn 42'

Stade du Ray, Nice
Attendance: 10,730
Referee: Ioakim Efthimiadis (Greece)

4–4 on aggregate, Nice won on away goals rule.

12 July 2003

OFK Beograd (Serbia and Montenegro)	3–3	(Czech Republic) 1. FC Synot
Kolaković 14'; Simić 50'; Grubač 90'	Report	Polách 31'; Kostka 54'; Abraham 77'

Omladinski Stadium, Belgrade
Attendance: 2,000
Referee: Ferenc Bede (Hungary)

Slovácko won 4–3 on aggregate.

12 July 2003

Győr (Hungary)	2–1	(Spain) Racing de Santander
Kartelo 13'; Bajevski 64'	Report	Valle 80'

Stadion ETO, Győr
Attendance: 2,300
Referee: Carlo Bertolini (Switzerland)

2–2 on aggregate, Racing de Santander won on away goals rule.

13 July 2003

Shamrock Rovers (Republic of Ireland)	0–2	(Czech Republic) Slovan Liberec
	Report	Koloušek 76'; Nezmar 86'

Richmond Park, Dublin
Attendance: 1,500
Referee: Jouni Hyytiä (Finland)

Slovan Liberec won 4–0 on aggregate.

12 July 2003

Brno (Czech Republic)	1–1	(Switzerland) Thun
Kroupa 11'	Report	Raimondi 63'

Stadion na Lesní ulici, Břeclav
Attendance: 2,110
Referee: Romāns Lajuks (Latvia)

Brno won 4–3 on aggregate.

12 July 2003

Gloria Bistrița (Romania)	1–1	(Italy) Brescia
Sânmărtean 60'	Report	González 90'

Stadionul Gloria, Bistrița
Attendance: 10,000
Referee: Florin Hâncu (Romania)

Brescia won 3–2 on aggregate.

12 July 2003

Wolfsburg (Germany)	2–0	(Bulgaria) Marek Dupnitsa
Petrov 43'; Munteanu 90' (pen.)	Report

Volkswagen Arena, Wolfsburg
Attendance: 6,637
Referee: Gylfi Thór Orrason (Iceland)

Wolfsburg won 3–1 on aggregate.

12 July 2003

Cibalia (Croatia)	4–2	(Belarus) Shakhtyor Soligorsk
Bartolović 45' (pen.); Ćorić 59'; Ratković 74'; Maroslavac 84'	Report	Skripchenko 13'; Nikifarenka 45'

Stadion HNK Cibalia, Vinkovci
Attendance: 2,300
Referee: Loizos Loizou (Cyprus)

Cibalia won 5–3 on aggregate.

12 July 2003

Tobol (Kazakhstan)	1–0	(Belgium) Sint-Truiden
Kotov 85'	Report

Kostanay Central Stadium, Kostanay
Attendance: 6,723
Referee: Martin Hansson (Sweden)

Tobol won 3–0 on aggregate.

12 July 2003

Wil (Switzerland)	3–1	(Netherlands) Willem II
Lustrinelli 4', 78'; Romano 84' (pen.)	Report	Caluwé 61'

Stadion Bergholz, Wil
Attendance: 1,800
Referee: Espen Berntsen (Norway)

Wil won 4–3 on aggregate.

12 July 2003

Pasching (Austria)	2–1	(North Macedonia) Pobeda
Baur 51'; Glieder 75'	Report	Načev 71'

Waldstadion, Pasching
Attendance: 1,416
Referee: Draženko Kovačić (Croatia)

Pasching won 3–2 on aggregate.

12 July 2003

Lierse (Belgium)	5–1	(Bosnia and Herzegovina) Sloboda Tuzla
Snoeckx 47', 89'; Huysegems 54'; Koné 75'; Schaessens 83' (pen.)	Report	Joldič 1'

Herman Vanderpoortenstadion, Lier
Attendance: 2,093
Referee: Augustus Constantin (Romania)

Lierse won 5–2 on aggregate.

13 July 2003

Sutjeska (Serbia and Montenegro)	0–1	(Finland) Tampere United
	Report	Koskela 90'

Gradski stadion, Nikšić
Attendance: 6,000
Referee: Paulius Malžinskas (Lithuania)

Tampere United won 1–0 on aggregate.

12 July 2003

Partizani (Albania)	0–3	(Moldova) Dacia Chișinău
	Report	V. Jăpălău 4'; Andriuță 30'; Orbu 67'

Qemal Stafa Stadium, Tirana
Attendance: 700
Referee: Roland Beck (Liechtenstein)

Dacia Chișinău won 5–0 on aggregate.

12 July 2003

ZTS Dubnica (Slovakia)	3–2	(Slovenia) Koper
Dovičovič 6', 90' (pen.); Suchý 80'	Report	Božičič 14'; Trenevski 45'

Mestský štadión, Dubnica nad Váhom
Attendance: 1,346
Referee: Sašo Lazarevski (Macedonia)

3–3 on aggregate, Koper won on away goals rule.

== Third round ==
Team 1	Agg.	Team 2	1st leg	2nd leg
Tobol (Kazakhstan)	0–4	(Austria) Pasching	0–1	0–3
Perugia (Italy)	4–0	(Finland) Allianssi	2–0	2–0
Egaleo (Greece)	4–5	(Slovenia) Koper	2–3	2–2
Nantes (France)	5–3	(Switzerland) Wil	2–1	3–2
Nice (France)	0–1	(Germany) Werder Bremen	0–0	0–1
Villarreal (Spain)	3–1	(Italy) Brescia	2–0	1–1
Guingamp (France)	4–5	(Czech Republic) Brno	2–1	2–4 (a.e.t.)
Dacia Chișinău (Moldova)	1–3	(Germany) Schalke 04	0–1	1–2
Racing de Santander (Spain)	1–3	(Czech Republic) Slovan Liberec	0–1	1–2
Slovácko (Czech Republic)	0–3	(Germany) Wolfsburg	0–1	0–2
Tampere United (Finland)	1–2	(Croatia) Cibalia	0–2	1–0
Heerenveen (Netherlands)	5–1	(Belgium) Lierse	4–1	1–0

=== First leg ===
19 July 2003

Tobol (Kazakhstan)	0–1	(Austria) Pasching
	Report	Glieder 80'

Kostanay Central Stadium, Kostanay
Attendance: 5,723
Referee: Emil Laursen (Denmark)

19 July 2003

Perugia (Italy)	2–0	(Finland) Allianssi
Bothroyd 23'; Fusani 45'	Report

Stadio Renato Curi, Perugia
Attendance: 6,294
Referee: Mark Halsey (England)

19 July 2003

Egaleo (Greece)	2–3	(Slovenia) Koper
Chloros 60'; Chatzis 61'	Report	Trenevski 48', 80'; Kovačevič 66'

Yiannis Pathiakakis Stadium, Ano Liosia
Attendance: 266
Referee: Alfonso Pérez Burrull (Spain)

19 July 2003

Nantes (France)	2–1	(Switzerland) Wil
N'Zigou 50'; Pujol 86'	Report	Rogério 23'

Stade René Gaillard, Niort
Attendance: 3,414
Referee: Michael Ross (Northern Ireland)

19 July 2003

Nice (France)	0–0	(Germany) Werder Bremen
	Report

Stade du Ray, Nice
Attendance: 9,448
Referee: Muhittin Boşat (Turkey)

19 July 2003

Villarreal (Spain)	2–0	(Italy) Brescia
Calleja 15'; Víctor 81'	Report

Estadio El Madrigal, Villarreal
Attendance: 8,531
Referee: Uriah Rennie (England)

19 July 2003

Guingamp (France)	2–1	(Czech Republic) Brno
Cabanas 81'; Le Roux 87' (pen.)	Report	Krško 20'

Stade du Roudourou, Guingamp
Attendance: 5,941
Referee: Jack van Hulten (Netherlands)

19 July 2003

Dacia Chișinău (Moldova)	0–1	(Germany) Schalke 04
	Report	Cziommer 23'

Stadionul Republican, Chișinău
Attendance: 3,000
Referee: Sten Kaldma (Estonia)

19 July 2003

Racing de Santander (Spain)	0–1	(Czech Republic) Slovan Liberec
	Report	Pospíšil 40'

Campos de Sport de El Sardinero, Santander
Attendance: 3,951
Referee: Damien Ledentu (France)

19 July 2003

1. FC Synot (Czech Republic)	0–1	(Germany) Wolfsburg
	Report	Topić 47'

Stadion Širůch, Staré Město
Attendance: 1,600
Referee: Paolo Bertini (Italy)

20 July 2003

Tampere United (Finland)	0–2	(Croatia) Cibalia
	Report	Jurić 78'; Žgela 88'

Ratina Stadion, Tampere
Attendance: 6,020
Referee: António Costa (Portugal)

19 July 2003

Heerenveen (Netherlands)	4–1	(Belgium) Lierse
Sibon 1'; Denneboom 28'; Knopper 35'; Samaras 85'	Report	Frigård 22'

Abe Lenstra Stadion, Heerenveen
Attendance: 8,300
Referee: Gianluca Paparesta (Italy)

=== Second leg ===
26 July 2003

Pasching (Austria)	3–0	(Kazakhstan) Tobol
Datoru 3'; Glieder 61'; Mayrleb 87'	Report

Waldstadion, Pasching
Attendance: 1,059
Referee: Sergei Alexeev (Russia)

Pasching won 4–0 on aggregate.

26 July 2003

Allianssi (Finland)	0–2	(Italy) Perugia
	Report	Gatti 21'; Zé Maria 69'

Pohjola Stadion, Vantaa
Attendance: 2,955
Referee: Peter Sippel (Germany)

Perugia won 4–0 on aggregate.

26 July 2003

Koper (Slovenia)	2–2	(Greece) Egaleo
Jakomin 9'; Božičič 73'	Report	Chloros 11', 87'

Bonifika Stadium, Koper
Attendance: 1,500
Referee: Matt Messias (England)

Koper won 5–4 on aggregate.

26 July 2003

Wil (Switzerland)	2–3	(France) Nantes
Romano 10' (pen.); Mordeku 23'	Report	Yepes 12'; Vahirua 43'; Pujol 64'

Stadion Bergholz, Wil
Attendance: 2,080
Referee: Jörg Keßler (Germany)

Nantes won 5–3 on aggregate.

26 July 2003

Werder Bremen (Germany)	1–0	(France) Nice
Micoud 75'	Report

Weser-Stadion, Bremen
Attendance: 22,500
Referee: Zsolt Szabó (Hungary)

Werder Bremen won 1–0 on aggregate.

26 July 2003

Brescia (Italy)	1–1	(Spain) Villarreal
Petruzzi 88'	Report	Guayre 52'

Stadio Mario Rigamonti, Brescia
Attendance: 9,177
Referee: Stefan Johannesson (Sweden)

Villarreal won 3–1 on aggregate.

26 July 2003

Brno (Czech Republic)	4–2 (a.e.t.)	(France) Guingamp
Abrahám 14'; Svoboda 87'; Došek 107'; Mezlík 111'	Report	Laspalles 75'; André 116'

Městský fotbalový stadion Srbská, Brno
Attendance: 7,480
Referee: Martin Ingvarsson (Sweden)

Brno won 5–4 on aggregate.

26 July 2003

Schalke 04 (Germany)	2–1	(Moldova) Dacia Chișinău
Sand 78'; Hanke 88'	Report	Orbu 90'

Arena AufSchalke, Gelsenkirchen
Attendance: 56,256
Referee: Joseph Attard (Malta)

Schalke 04 won 3–1 on aggregate.

26 July 2003

Slovan Liberec (Czech Republic)	2–1	(Spain) Racing de Santander
Koloušek 34'; Zápotočný 83'	Report	Txiki 53'

Stadion u Nisy, Liberec
Attendance: 8,288
Referee: Igor Ishchenko (Ukraine)

Slovan Liberec won 3–1 on aggregate.

26 July 2003

Wolfsburg (Germany)	2–0	(Czech Republic) 1. FC Synot
Klimowicz 23'; Petrov 77'	Report

Volkswagen Arena, Wolfsburg
Attendance: 13,290
Referee: Paul McKeon (Republic of Ireland)

Wolfsburg won 3–0 on aggregate.

26 July 2003

Cibalia (Croatia)	0–1	(Finland) Tampere United
	Report	Räsänen 65'

Stadion HNK Cibalia, Vinkovci
Attendance: 435
Referee: Markus Nobs (Switzerland)

Cibalia won 2–1 on aggregate.

26 July 2003

Lierse (Belgium)	0–1	(Netherlands) Heerenveen
	Report	Väyrynen 90'

Herman Vanderpoortenstadion, Lier
Attendance: 3,200
Referee: Wolfgang Sowa (Austria)

Heerenveen won 5–1 on aggregate.

== Semi-finals ==
Team 1	Agg.	Team 2	1st leg	2nd leg
Nantes (France)	0–1	(Italy) Perugia	0–1	0–0
Pasching (Austria)	5–1	(Germany) Werder Bremen	4–0	1–1
Brno (Czech Republic)	1–3	(Spain) Villarreal	1–1	0–2
Schalke 04 (Germany)	2–1	(Czech Republic) Slovan Liberec	2–1	0–0
Heerenveen (Netherlands)	2–1	(Slovenia) Koper	2–0	0–1
Cibalia (Croatia)	1–8	(Germany) Wolfsburg	1–4	0–4

=== First leg ===
30 July 2003
17:00

Cibalia (Croatia)	1–4	(Germany) Wolfsburg
Lučić 28'	Report	Klimowicz 14', 53'; Petrov 38'; Thiam 58'

Stadion HNK Cibalia, Vinkovci
Attendance: 3,450
Referee: Nicolai Vollquartz (Denmark)

30 July 2003
18:00

Pasching (Austria)	4–0	(Germany) Werder Bremen
Horvath 36'; Glieder 40', 43'; Baur 88'	Report

Waldstadion, Pasching
Attendance: 5,312
Referee: Grzegorz Gilewski (Poland)

30 July 2003
20:00

Nantes (France)	0–1	(Italy) Perugia
	Report	Di Loreto 61'

Stade René Gaillard, Niort
Attendance: 4,872
Referee: Alon Yefet (Israel)

30 July 2003
20:00

Brno (Czech Republic)	1–1	(Spain) Villarreal
Došek 53'	Report	José Mari 45'

Městský fotbalový stadion Srbská, Brno
Attendance: 10,506
Referee: Edo Trivković (Croatia)

30 July 2003
20:00

Heerenveen (Netherlands)	2–0	(Slovenia) Koper
Sibon 11'; Knopper 30'	Report

Abe Lenstra Stadion, Heerenveen
Attendance: 12,200
Referee: Tommy Skjerven (Norway)

30 July 2003
20:15

Schalke 04 (Germany)	2–1	(Czech Republic) Slovan Liberec
Trojan 81'; Asamoah 85'	Report	Koloušek 79'

Arena AufSchalke, Gelsenkirchen
Attendance: 52,288
Referee: Pasquale Rodomonti (Italy)

=== Second leg ===
6 August 2003
17:30

Koper (Slovenia)	1–0	(Netherlands) Heerenveen
Jakomin 28'	Report

Bonifika Stadium, Koper
Attendance: 2,000
Referee: Miroslav Liba (Czech Republic)

Heerenveen won 2–1 on aggregate.

6 August 2003
18:30

Wolfsburg (Germany)	4–0	(Croatia) Cibalia
Klimowicz 30'; Karhan 48'; Biliškov 57'; Munteanu 74'	Report

Volkswagen Arena, Wolfsburg
Attendance: 6,114
Referee: Laurent Duhamel (France)

Wolfsburg won 8–1 on aggregate.

6 August 2003
20:00

Slovan Liberec (Czech Republic)	0–0	(Germany) Schalke 04
	Report

Stadion u Nisy, Liberec
Attendance: 9,090
Referee: Stefan Meßner (Austria)

Schalke 04 won 2–1 on aggregate.

6 August 2003
20:15

Werder Bremen (Germany)	1–1	(Austria) Pasching
Charisteas 33'	Report	Kiesenebner 89'

Weser-Stadion, Bremen
Attendance: 24,000
Referee: Anton Stredák (Slovakia)

Pasching won 5–1 on aggregate.

6 August 2003
20:30

Perugia (Italy)	0–0	(France) Nantes
	Report

Stadio Renato Curi, Perugia
Attendance: 15,680
Referee: Julián Rodríguez Santiago (Spain)

Perugia won 1–0 on aggregate.

6 August 2003
21:45

Villarreal (Spain)	2–0	(Czech Republic) Brno
J. López 22'; Anderson 90+'	Report

Estadio El Madrigal, Villarreal
Attendance: 9,567
Referee: Michael Weiner (Germany)

Villarreal won 3–1 on aggregate.

== Finals ==
Team 1	Agg.	Team 2	1st leg	2nd leg
Pasching (Austria)	0–2	(Germany) Schalke 04	0–2	0–0
Heerenveen (Netherlands)	1–2	(Spain) Villarreal	1–2	0–0
Perugia (Italy)	3–0	(Germany) Wolfsburg	1–0	2–0

=== First leg ===
12 August 2003
18:00

Pasching (Austria)	0–2	(Germany) Schalke 04
	Report	Altıntop 18'; Agali 47'

Waldstadion, Pasching
Attendance: 6,700
Referee: Cosimo Bolognino (Italy)

12 August 2003
20:00

Heerenveen (Netherlands)	1–2	(Spain) Villarreal
Ballesteros 25' (o.g.)	Report	Calleja 13'; Víctor 45'

Abe Lenstra Stadion, Heerenveen
Attendance: 13,000
Referee: Peter Fröjdfeldt (Sweden)

12 August 2003
20:30

Perugia (Italy)	1–0	(Germany) Wolfsburg
Bothroyd 39'	Report

Stadio Renato Curi, Perugia
Attendance: 14,473
Referee: Paulo Manuel Gomes Costa (Portugal)

=== Second leg ===
26 August 2003
20:30

Schalke 04 (Germany)	0–0	(Austria) Pasching
	Report

Arena AufSchalke, Gelsenkirchen
Attendance: 56,067
Referee: Steve Bennett (England)

Schalke 04 won 2–0 on aggregate.

26 August 2003
21:00

Wolfsburg (Germany)	0–2	(Italy) Perugia
	Report	Tedesco 17'; Berrettoni 90'

Volkswagen Arena, Wolfsburg
Attendance: 12,496
Referee: Dick van Egmond (Netherlands)

Perugia won 3–0 on aggregate.

26 August 2003
21:45

Villarreal (Spain)	0–0	(Netherlands) Heerenveen
	Report

Estadio El Madrigal, Villarreal
Attendance: 11,304
Referee: Stuart Dougal (Scotland)

Villarreal won 2–1 on aggregate.

== See also ==
- 2003–04 UEFA Champions League
- 2003–04 UEFA Cup
