= Genish =

Genish may refer to:

== People ==
- Gal Genish (born 1991), Israeli footballer
- Lior Genish is a former Israeli footballer who played in Maccabi Netanya.
- Sharon Ganish (sometimes Genish) (born 1983), Israeli-American model
