= Cortellini =

Cortellini is an Italian surname. Notable people with the surname include:

- Ángel María Cortellini (1819–1887), Spanish painter
- Camillo Cortellini (1561–1630), Italian composer, singer, and violinist
- Roberto Cortellini (born 1982), Italian footballer
