= Sergej Grubač =

Montenegrin footballer

Personal information
- Date of birth: 29 May 2000 (age 26)
- Place of birth: Belgrade, FR Yugoslavia
- Height: 1.90 m (6 ft 3 in)
- Position: Striker

Youth career
- –2012: Digenis Akritas Morphou
- 2012: Vitesse
- 2012–2014: Digenis Akritas Morphou
- 2014–2018: APOEL
- 2018–2019: Chievo

Senior career*
Years	Team	Apps	(Gls)
2017–2018	APOEL	1	(0)
2018–2021	Chievo	12	(0)
2022	Botoșani	7	(0)
2022–2025	Chindia Târgoviște	25	(1)
2026	CSM Olimpia Satu Mare	0	(0)

International career
2016	Montenegro U16	1	(0)
2016–2017	Montenegro U17	13	(1)
2017–2018	Montenegro U19	9	(1)
2019	Montenegro U21	5	(0)
- * Club domestic league appearances and goals as of 1 March 2025

Sergej Grubač (Montenegrin Cyrillic: Сергеј Грубач; born 29 May 2000) is a Montenegrin professional footballer who plays as a striker.

== Club career ==
=== APOEL ===
He made his Cypriot First Division debut for APOEL at the age of 17 in a game against Olympiakos Nicosia on 25 November 2017.

=== Chievo Verona ===
On 3 July 2018 Grubač signed a five-year contract for Italian Seria A side Chievo. He made his league debut on 14 April 2018 against Napoli. Chievo was excluded from Serie B in the summer of 2021 due to debts, making him a free agent.

=== Chindia Târgoviște ===
On 7 September 2022, Grubač joined Romanian club Chindia Târgoviște.

== International career ==
Born in Serbia, Grubač was a member of all the Montenegro national youth teams. He scored 11 goals in 25 appearances for Montenegro under-17 and Montenegro under-19

== Personal life ==
He is a son of former Hamburger SV striker Vanja Grubač.

== Honours ==
APOEL

- Cypriot First Division: 2017–18
- Cypriot Super Cup runner-up: 2017
