= Herenthout =

- Municipality
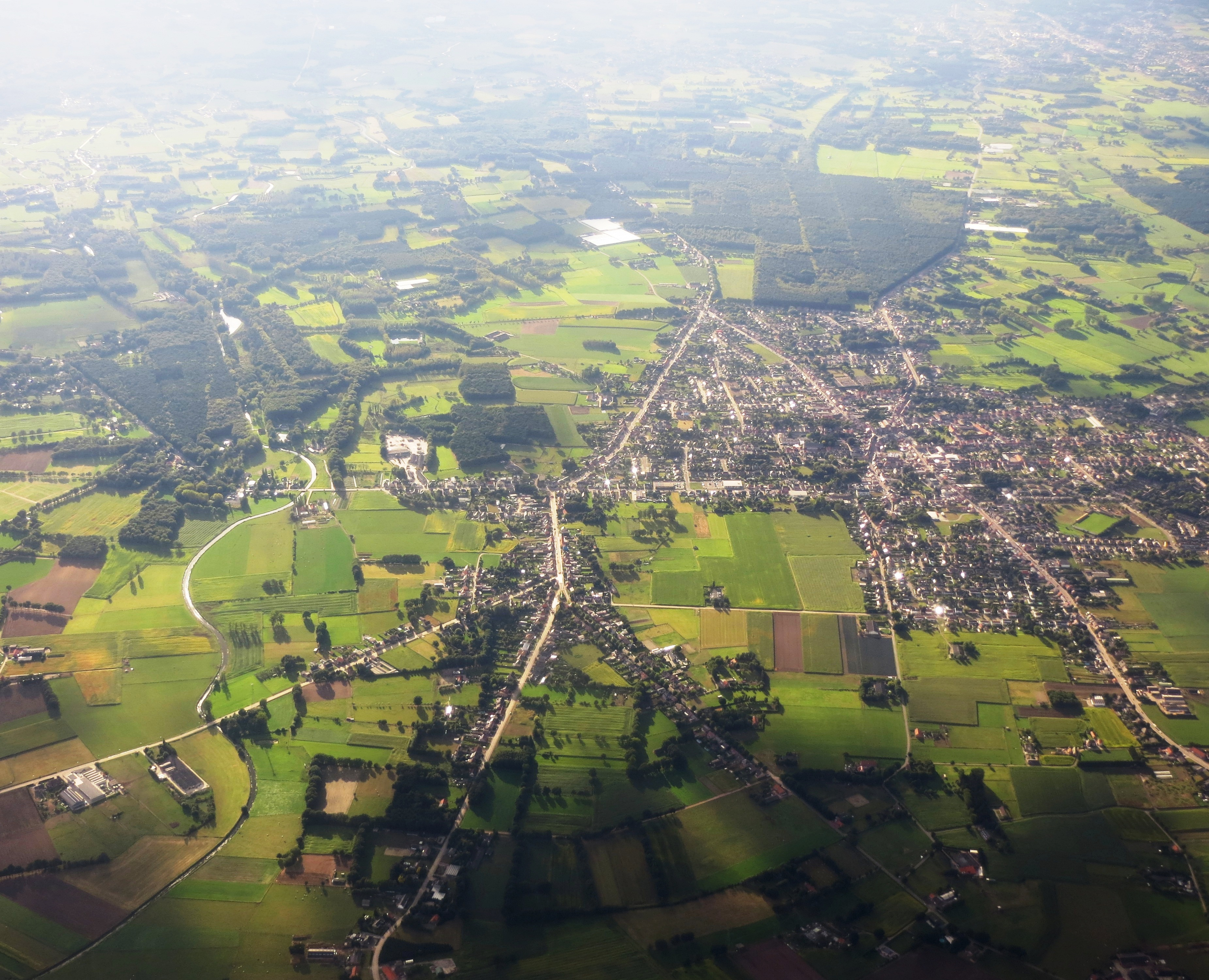

- Flag Coat of arms

- Location of Herenthout in the province of Antwerp
- Interactive map of Herenthout
- Location in Belgium
- Coordinates: 51°09′N 04°46′E
- Country: Belgium
- Community: Flemish Community
- Region: Flemish Region
- Province: Antwerp
- Arrondissement: Turnhout

Government
  - Mayor: Stijn Raeymaekers (Eenheid-N-VA)
  - Governing parties: Eenheid-N-VA, CD&V

Area
  - Total: 23.61 km^{2} (9.12 sq mi)

Population (2020-01-01)
  - Total: 9,109
  - Density: 385.8/km^{2} (999.2/sq mi)
- Postal codes: 2270
- NIS code: 13012
- Area codes: 014
- Website: www.herenthout.be

Herenthout (Dutch pronunciation: [ˈɦeːrəntɦʌut]) is a municipality located in the province of Antwerp in Belgium. The municipality only comprises the town of Herenthout proper, including Uilenberg. In 2021, Herenthout had a total population of 9,185 people. The total area is 23.55 km^{2}.

This village is also well known for having the officially recognized oldest organized carnival parade in Belgium, with the first edition dating back to February 1882. The mascot of the parade is named "Peer Stoet".

== Notable people ==
- Jürgen Raeymaeckers (1985) – football striker who currently plays for K. Lyra T.S.V.
- Wim Vandekeybus (1963) – actor, choreographer, dancer and film director
- Johan Van Herck (1974) – former professional tennis player

== Gallery ==
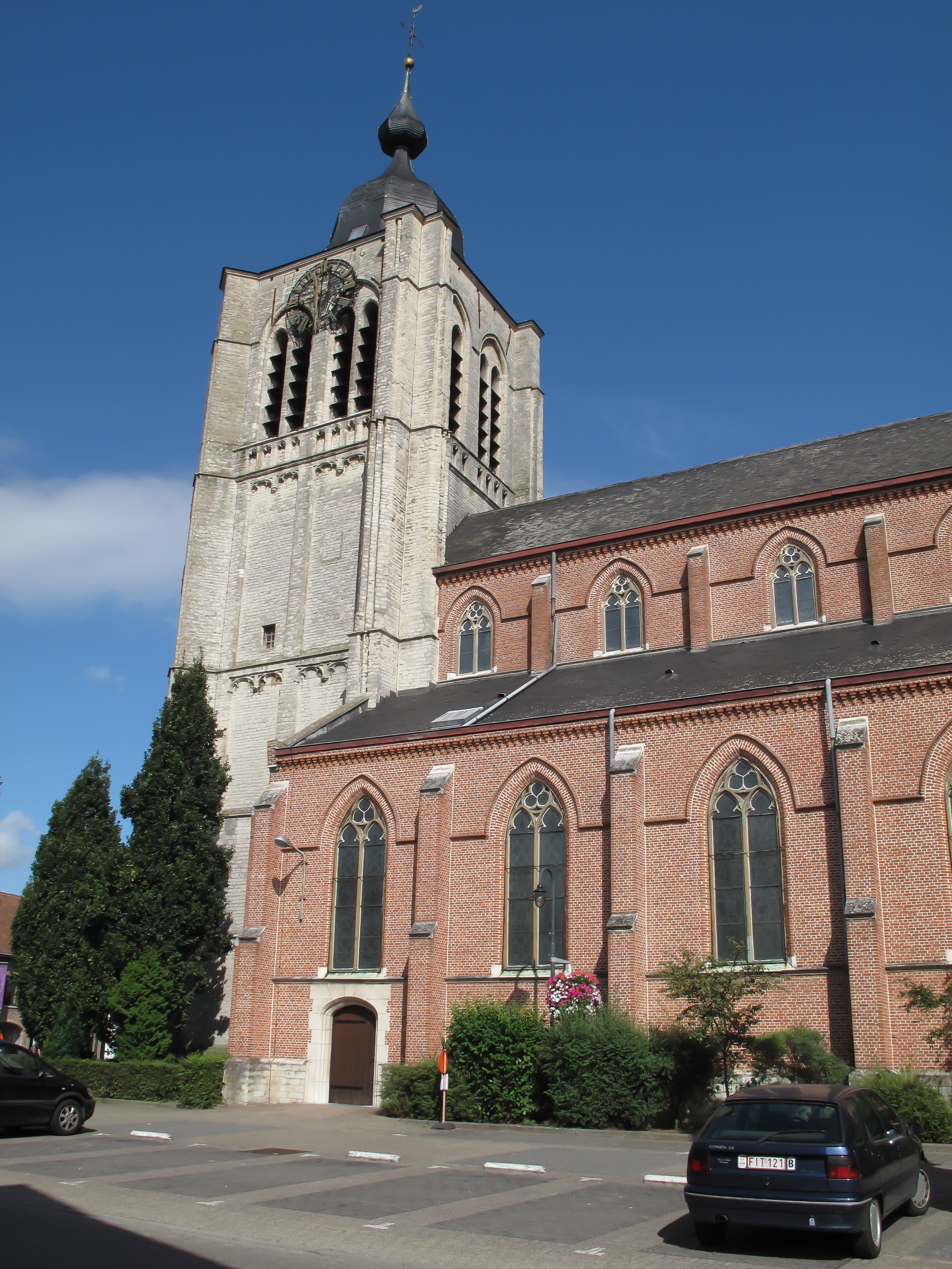
Herenthout church

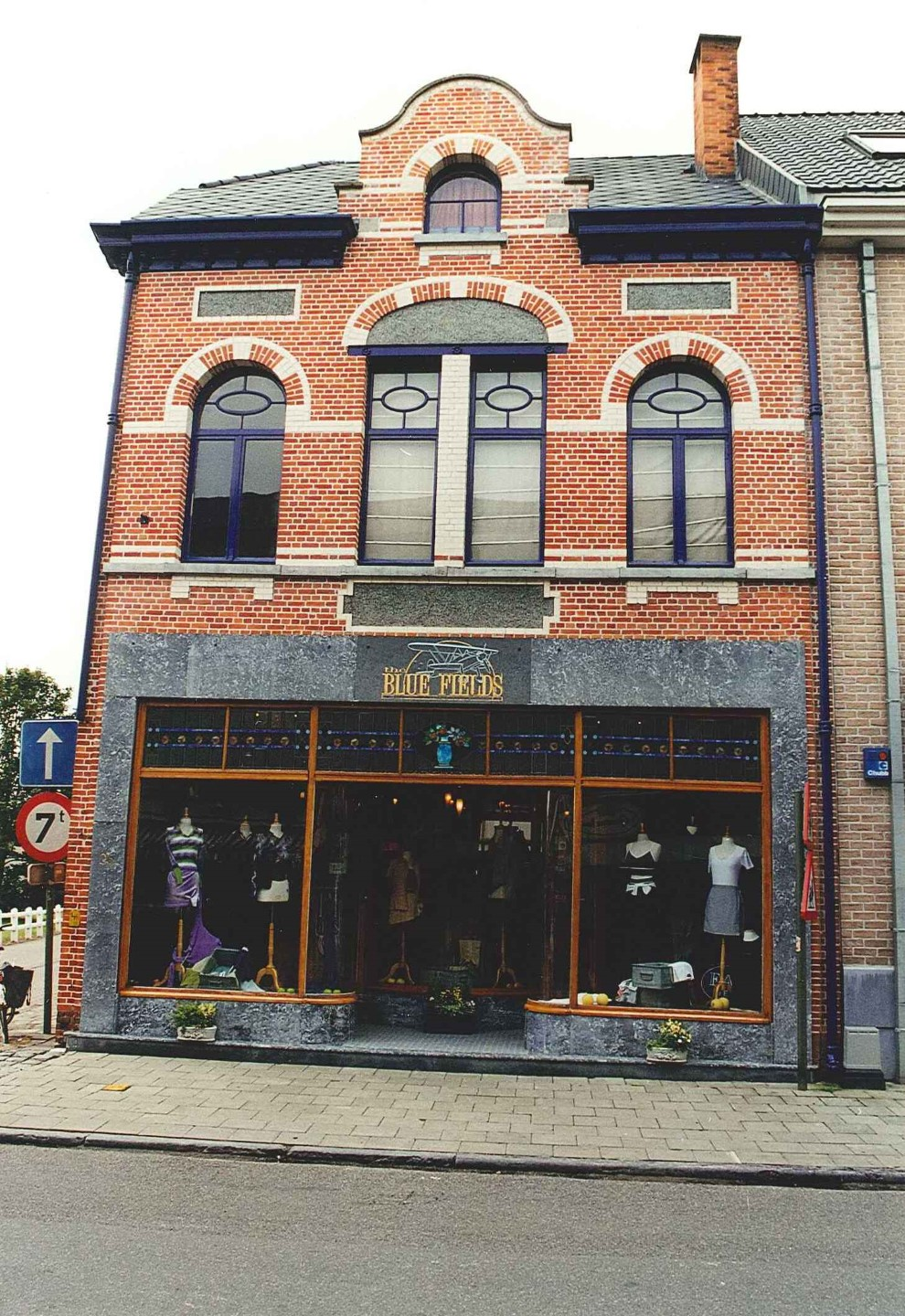
Shop in Herenthout

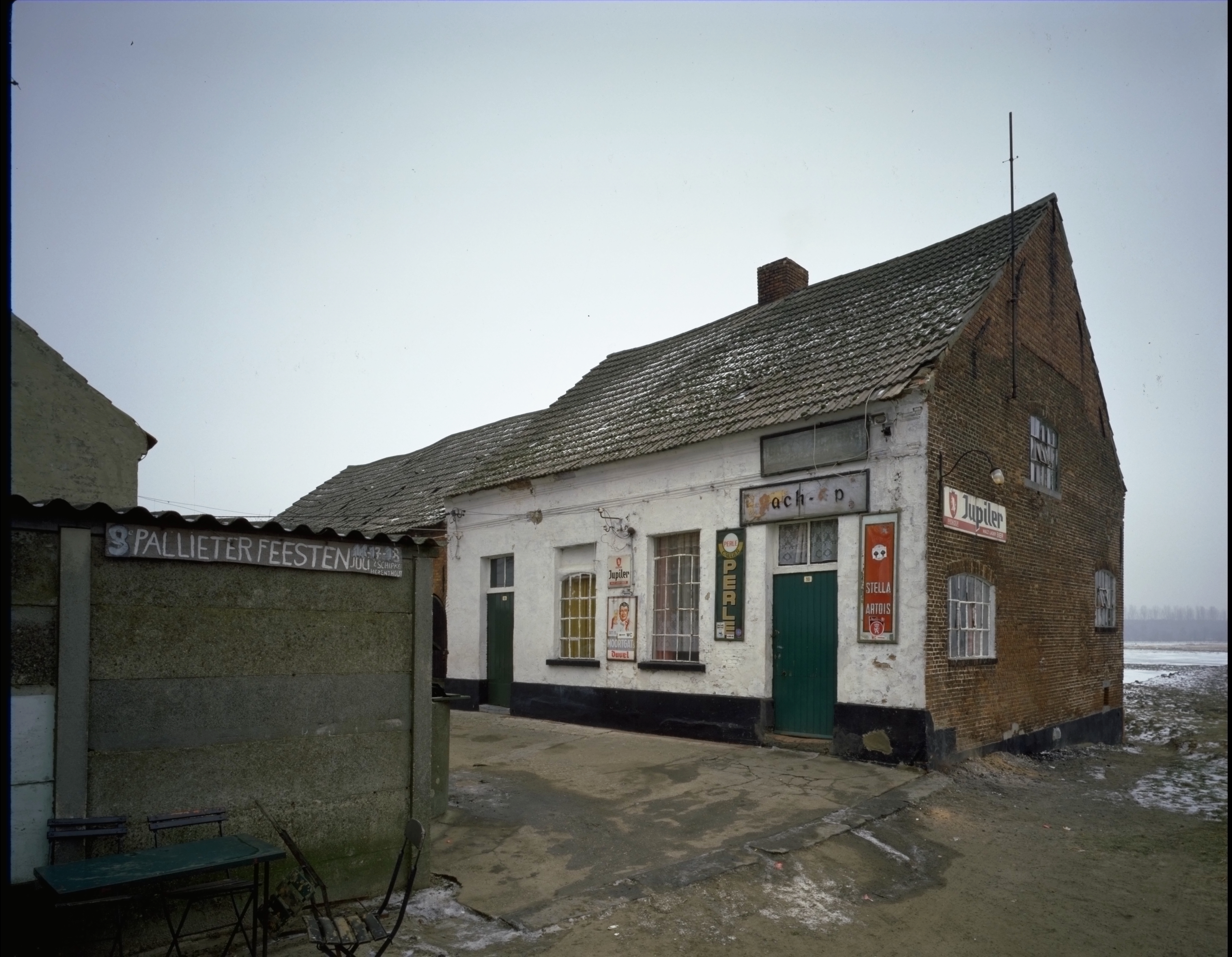
Pub 't Schipke

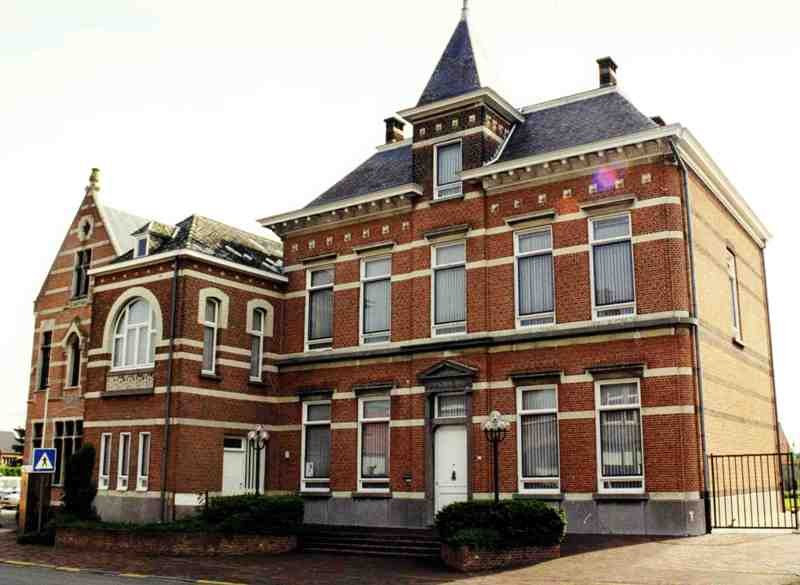
gemeentehuis in Herenthout
