= Andrey Lyavonchyk =

Belarusian footballer

Personal information
- Date of birth: 2 January 1977 (age 49)
- Height: 1.76 m (5 ft 9 1/2 in)
- Position: Midfielder

Youth career
- Dinamo Minsk

Senior career*
| Years | Team | Apps | (Gls) |
| 1995–1998 | Dinamo-Juni Minsk | 77 | (12) |
| 1999–2000 | Dinamo Minsk | 42 | (9) |
| 2001–2014 | Shakhtyor Soligorsk | 368 | (21) |

International career
| 1999 | Belarus U21 | 2 | (0) |
- * Club domestic league appearances and goals

Andrey Ivanavich Lyavonchyk (Belarusian: Андрэй Лявончык; Russian: Андрей Иванович Леончик; born 2 January 1977) is a retired Belarusian professional footballer. As of 2015, he works in administration of Shakhtyor Soligorsk.

== Honours ==
Shakhtyor Soligorsk

- Belarusian Premier League champion: 2005
- Belarusian Cup winner: 2003–04, 2013–14
