= Branko Baković =

Serbian footballer

Personal information
- Full name: Branko Baković
- Date of birth: 31 August 1981 (age 45)
- Place of birth: Kragujevac, SFR Yugoslavia
- Height: 1.82 m (6 ft 0 in)
- Position: Attacking midfielder

Youth career
- 1999–2000: Radnički Kragujevac

Senior career*
Years	Team	Apps	(Gls)
2000–2002	Radnički Kragujevac	37	(4)
2002–2006	OFK Beograd	93	(20)
2007	Shandong Luneng	6	(0)
2007	Politehnica Iași	7	(0)
2008	Naftovyk-Ukrnafta Okhtyrka	16	(0)
2009	Radnički Kragujevac	12	(5)
2009–2010	Slavija Sarajevo	7	(4)
2010	Radnički Kragujevac	3	(0)
2011	Grbalj	9	(1)
2011	Mladenovac	12	(4)
2012–2015	Black Stars Basel	61	(4)
Total		263	(42)

International career
2003	Serbia and Montenegro U21	1	(0)
- * Club domestic league appearances and goals

Branko Baković (Serbian Cyrillic: Бранко Баковић; born 31 August 1981) is a Serbian retired footballer who played as an attacking midfielder.

== Career ==
After starting out at his hometown club Radnički Kragujevac, Baković was transferred to ambitious OFK Beograd in the summer of 2002. He spent the following five seasons at Stara Karaburma, scoring 20 goals in 93 league games. He also made a string of appearances in European competitions, reaching the semi-finals of the 2004 UEFA Intertoto Cup.

In 2007, Baković moved abroad to Chinese club Shandong Luneng, but failed to make an impact. He also briefly played for Romania's Politehnica Iași and Ukraine's Naftovyk-Ukrnafta Okhtyrka, before returning to his parent club Radnički Kragujevac in early 2009.

== Statistics ==
Club	Season	League	
Club	Season	Apps	Goals
Radnički Kragujevac	2000–01	13	2
Radnički Kragujevac	2001–02	24	2
Radnički Kragujevac	Total	37	4
OFK Beograd	2002–03	17	2
OFK Beograd	2003–04	23	3
OFK Beograd	2004–05	22	6
OFK Beograd	2005–06	19	8
OFK Beograd	2006–07	12	1
OFK Beograd	Total	93	20
Career total		130	24
