= Staniša Nikolić =

Bosnian footballer (born 1980)

Personal information
- Date of birth: 28 November 1980 (age 45)
- Place of birth: Tuzla, SFR Yugoslavia
- Height: 1.81 m (5 ft 11 in)
- Position: Right-back

Youth career
- Sloboda Tuzla

Senior career*
Years	Team	Apps	(Gls)
1999–2002	Sloboda Tuzla		
2002–2003	Osijek	3	(0)
2003–2004	Sloboda Tuzla	28	(2)
2005	Vojvodina	0	(0)
2005–2006	Sloboda Tuzla	13	(0)
2006–2009	Zrinjski Mostar	87	(8)
2009–2010	DAC Dunajská Streda	26	(1)
2010–2011	Sloboda Tuzla	25	(0)
2012	DAC Dunajská Streda	15	(0)
2012	Sloboda Tuzla	25	(0)
2013–2016	First Vienna	62	(1)
2017	SC Wolkersdorf	0	(0)
2017	Technopool Admira	3	(0)
2018	UD Süssenbrunn		

International career
2008	Bosnia and Herzegovina	2	(0)
- * Club domestic league appearances and goals

Staniša Nikolić (born 28 November 1980) is a Bosnian-Herzegovinian former professional footballer who played as a right-back. he spent the latter years of his career in the Austrian amateur leagues.

== Club career ==
The right back from Tuzla has played most of his career in his home town club FK Sloboda Tuzla. In 2002, he moved to Croatia and played with NK Osijek one season before returning to Sloboda. His next experience abroad was with Serbian FK Vojvodina but after a half season he was back. In summer 2006 he moved to another Bosnian top league club, HŠK Zrinjski Mostar where he played solid three seasons which made him a move in June 2009, to Slovakia to play with ambitious FK DAC 1904 Dunajská Streda in the 2009–10 Slovak Superliga. He still played one match in Slovak league in the 2010–11 season before returning to FK Sloboda Tuzla to finish the season with 14 matches in the 2010–11 Premier League of Bosnia and Herzegovina.

== International career ==
Nikolić made his debut for Bosnia and Herzegovina in a January 2008 friendly match away against Japan and earned two caps. His second and final international was a June 2008 friendly against Azerbaijan.
