= Václav Koloušek =

Czech footballer

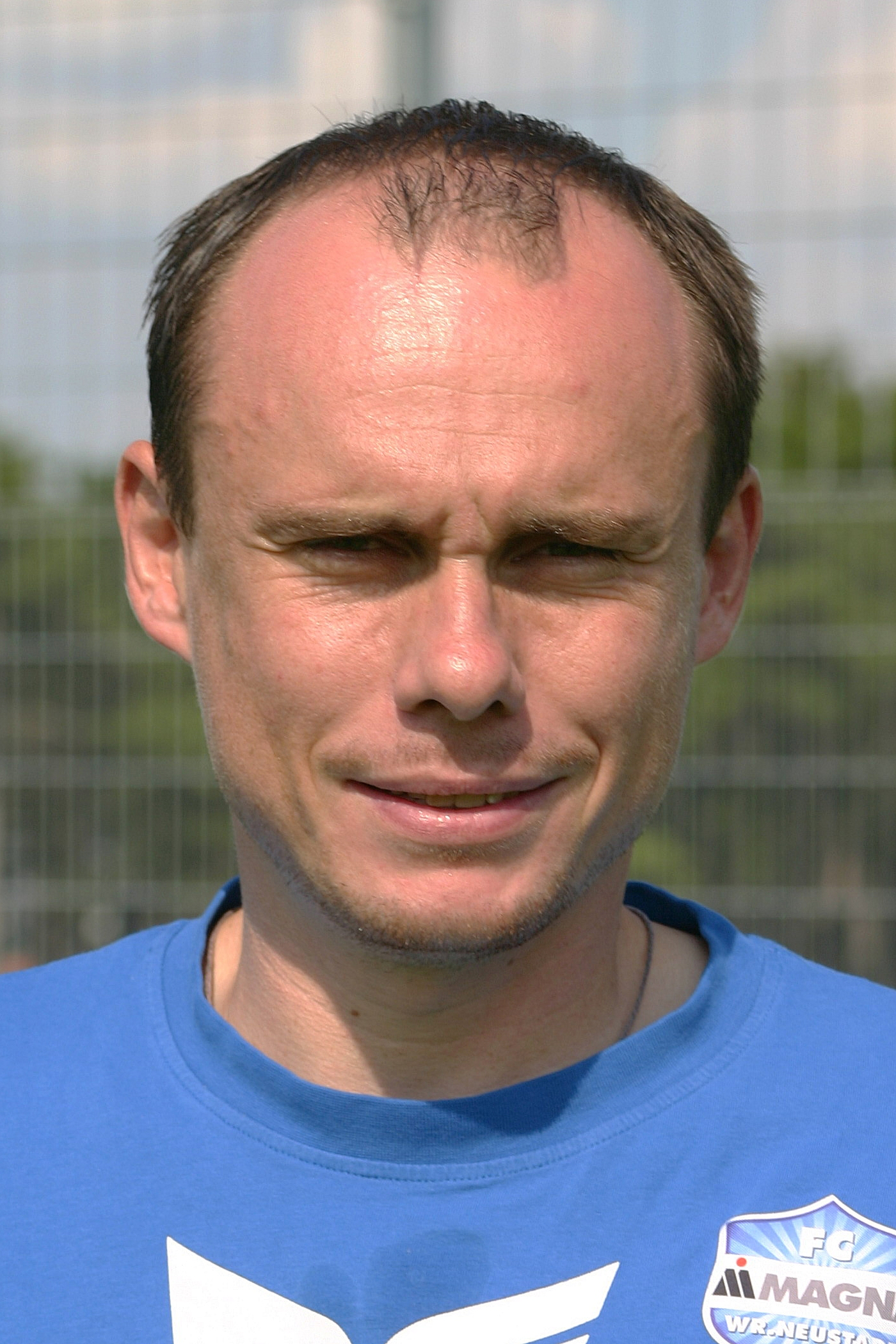

Personal information
- Date of birth: 13 April 1976 (age 50)
- Place of birth: Mladá Boleslav, Czechoslovakia
- Height: 1.74 m (5 ft 9 in)
- Position: Midfielder

Youth career
- 1982–1993: Mladá Boleslav

Senior career*
Years	Team	Apps	(Gls)
1993–1994	Mladá Boleslav	19	(4)
1995–1996	Dukla Prague	33	(10)
1996–1997	Dukla Příbram	27	(18)
1997–1999	Salernitana	30	(2)
2000	Fermana	13	(2)
2001	Sparta Prague	19	(3)
2001–2003	Slovan Liberec	57	(11)
2003	→ Salernitana (loan)	6	(0)
2004–2005	Slavia Praha	20	(6)
2005	FK Marila Příbram	14	(0)
2006–2007	Wacker Tirol	41	(6)
2007–2008	Wacker Innsbruck	32	(2)
2008–2011	SC Wiener Neustadt	53	(4)
2011–2012	FC Zbrojovka Brno	20	(1)
2012–2015	FC Vysočina Jihlava	47	(6)

International career
1996–1997	Czech Republic U-21	7	(3)
2002	Czech Republic	5	(1)
- * Club domestic league appearances and goals

Václav Koloušek (born 13 April 1976) is a Czech former footballer who played as a midfielder.

== Club career ==
Born in Mladá Boleslav, Koloušek began his Football career in the youth team of his hometown club FK Mladá Boleslav. From there he went to Dukla Prague. At the age of 21 he left for Italy and joined Salernitana Sport. After 2 years with Salernitana he moved on to Fermana Calcio.

In 1999, he came back home to Sparta Prague. In 2001, he moved again to Slovan Liberec, During his time at Liberec, Koloušek contracted leukemia, badly affecting his fitness. After overcoming the illness, he transferred to Slavia Prague in 2003, however due to his weakened condition he could not establish himself at Slavia.

At the start of the 2005–06 Season, the midfielder moved on to FK Marila Příbram and after a very successful Autumn in Příbram he was signed by Austrian club FC Wacker Tirol.

For the 2008–09 season he moved to Austrian 2nd Division side FC Magna Wiener Neustadt.

== International career ==
Koloušek made his debut for the Czech Republic in a February 2002 friendly match against Hungary, in which he scored a debut goal after only five minutes. He earned 5 caps, scoring one goal. His final international game was also in 2002, a September friendly match against Yugoslavia.

=== International goals ===
Scores and results list Czech Republic's goal tally first.

No	Date	Venue	Opponent	Score	Result	Competition
1.	12 February 2002	GSZ Stadium, Larnaca, Cyprus	Hungary	1–0	2–0	2002 Cyprus International Football Tournament
