= Sharon Ganish =

Israeli-American model

Sharon Genish שרון גניש
- Born: May 21, 1983 (age 43); Los Angeles, California, United States
- Modeling information
- Height: 1.76 m (5 ft 9 in)
- Hair color: Light brown
- Eye color: Hazel

Sharon Ganish (Hebrew: שרון גניש; sometimes Genish, born May 21, 1983) is an Israeli-American model. She was born in Los Angeles, United States, to Jewish parents, and her family moved to Israel when she was 3 years old.

She began modelling at the age of 16 but later moved to New York City, where she was signed by the Clear agency, which until then represented male models only.

In 2005, Genish was chosen to be the face of Israeli make-up company "Ilmakiage" and has appeared in advertisements for Versace, for whom she has also walked the catwalk. Her other runway credits include Alesandro Dell'Acqua, Balenciaga, Coccapani, DSquared2, Emilio Pucci, Emmanuel Ungaro, Iceberg, La Perla, and Stella McCartney.

Photo Italy Magazine chose Genish as best model of the year in 2003.
