= Vanja Grubač =

Montenegrin footballer

Personal information
- Full name: Vanja Grubač
- Date of birth: 11 January 1971 (age 55)
- Place of birth: Nikšić, SR Montenegro, SFR Yugoslavia
- Height: 1.86 m (6 ft 1 in)
- Position: Striker

Senior career*
| Years | Team | Apps | (Gls) |
| 1989–1991 | Sutjeska Nikšić | 8 | (0) |
| 1993 | Sloga Kraljevo | | |
| 1993–1994 | OFK Beograd | 29 | (16) |
| 1994 | Pierikos | | |
| 1995 | OFK Beograd | 9 | (7) |
| 1995 | Le Havre | 8 | (0) |
| 1996 | OFK Beograd | 12 | (4) |
| 1997 | Braga | 3 | (0) |
| 1997–1998 | OFK Beograd | 26 | (31) |
| 1998–2000 | Hamburger SV | 11 | (2) |
| 2000 | OFK Beograd | 9 | (0) |
| 2001 | Erzurumspor | 3 | (1) |
| 2002–2003 | OFK Beograd | 21 | (10) |
| 2003 | Digenis Morphou | | |
| 2004 | Al-Wakrah | | |
| Total | | 139 | (71) |
- * Club domestic league appearances and goals

Vanja Grubač (Serbian Cyrillic: Вања Грубач; born 11 January 1971) is a Montenegrin former professional footballer who played as a striker.

== Career ==
Grubač played for his hometown club Sutjeska Nikšić in the Yugoslav Second League for three seasons (1988–89, 1989–90, and 1990–91), collecting eight appearances. He joined OFK Beograd after a spell with Sloga Kraljevo in 1993. Over the next few years, Grubač would go on to play for several European clubs, including French Le Havre and Portuguese Braga, but would eventually return to OFK Beograd after each brief spell abroad.

In 1998, Grubač was transferred from OFK Beograd to Hamburger SV for a fee of 1.1 million DM. He appeared in 11 Bundesliga games over his two seasons at the club, scoring two goals. In 2000, Grubač made another return to OFK Beograd, before moving to Turkish club Erzurumspor in early 2001.

== Personal life ==
Grubač is the father of fellow footballer Sergej Grubač.

== Career statistics ==
| Club | Season | League | |
| Club | Season | Apps | Goals |
|---|---|---|---|
| Sutjeska Nikšić | 1988–89 | 1 | 0 |
| Sutjeska Nikšić | 1989–90 | 6 | 0 |
| Sutjeska Nikšić | 1990–91 | 1 | 0 |
| Sutjeska Nikšić | Total | 8 | 0 |
| Sloga Kraljevo | 1992–93 | | |
| OFK Beograd | 1993–94 | 29 | 16 |
| Pierikos | 1994–95 | | |
| OFK Beograd | 1994–95 | 9 | 7 |
| Le Havre | 1995–96 | 8 | 0 |
| OFK Beograd | 1995–96 | 12 | 4 |
| Braga | 1996–97 | 3 | 0 |
| OFK Beograd | 1997–98 | 26 | 31 |
| Hamburger SV | 1998–99 | 7 | 1 |
| Hamburger SV | 1999–2000 | 4 | 1 |
| Hamburger SV | Total | 11 | 2 |
| OFK Beograd | 2000–01 | 9 | 0 |
| Erzurumspor | 2000–01 | 3 | 1 |
| OFK Beograd | 2001–02 | 10 | 4 |
| OFK Beograd | 2002–03 | 11 | 6 |
| OFK Beograd | Total | 21 | 10 |
| Digenis Morphou | 2003–04 | | |
| Al-Wakrah | 2004–05 | | |
| Career total | | 139 | 71 |
