= Gradimir Crnogorac =

Bosnian footballer (born 1982)

Personal information
- Date of birth: 14 November 1982 (age 43)
- Place of birth: Tuzla, SFR Yugoslavia
- Height: 1.84 m (6 ft 0 in)
- Position: Centre-back

Youth career
- –2000: Sloboda Tuzla

Senior career*
Years	Team	Apps	(Gls)
2000–2001	Sloboda Tuzla	19	(2)
2001–2002	Budućnost Banovići		
2002–2005	Sloboda Tuzla	54	(1)
2005	Randers	0	(0)
2005–2006	Akademisk Boldklub	17	(2)
2006	Spartak Nizhny Novgorod	18	(0)
2006–2007	Sloboda Tuzla	29	(0)
2008–2009	Bratstvo Gračanica		
2009–2010	Sloboda Tuzla	24	(0)
2010–2011	Atyrau	28	(0)
2011–2013	Kaisar	45	(8)
2013	Sloboda Tuzla	11	(2)
2013–2014	Zvijezda Gradačac	6	(0)
2014–2016	Gradina	13	(0)

International career
2004	Bosnia and Herzegovina	3	(0)

Managerial career
- 2019: Sloboda Tuzla (caretaker)
- 2019–2021: Sloboda Tuzla
- * Club domestic league appearances and goals

Gradimir Crnogorac (born 14 November 1982) is a Bosnian professional football manager and former player. He was most recently the manager of Bosnian Premier League club Sloboda Tuzla.

== International career ==
Crnogorac made his debut for Bosnia and Herzegovina in an April 2004 friendly against Finland and earned a total of three caps, scoring no goals. His final international game was an October 2004 FIFA World Cup qualification match against Serbia and Montenegro.

== Managerial statistics ==
As of 8 March 2021

Managerial record by team and tenure
Team	From	To	Record							
Team	From	To	G	W	D	L	GF	GA	GD	Win %
Sloboda Tuzla U17	1 February 2017	30 June 2018	33	11	8	14	43	46	−3	33.33 (Note: Counting only the 2017–18 season)
Sloboda Tuzla (caretaker)	1 October 2019	7 October 2019	1	0	0	1	2	3	−1	0.00
Sloboda Tuzla U17	18 October 2019	17 December 2019	5	3	0	2	8	4	+4	60.00
Sloboda Tuzla	18 December 2019	9 March 2021	25	7	6	12	26	35	−9	28.00
Total			64	21	14	29	79	88	−9	32.81
