= Aleksandar Simić =

Serbian footballer

Personal information
- Date of birth: 31 January 1980 (age 46)
- Place of birth: Ljubovija, SFR Yugoslavia
- Height: 1.73 m (5 ft 8 in)
- Position: Midfielder

Senior career*
Years	Team	Apps	(Gls)
1997–2001	Radnički Beograd	61	(3)
2002–2006	OFK Beograd	120	(18)
2004	→ Istres (loan)	4	(0)
2007–2009	OFI	65	(10)
2009–2011	AEL	30	(3)
2011–2012	OFK Beograd	21	(2)
2012	Voždovac	12	(0)
2013	Panserraikos	16	(4)
2013	Kerkyra	12	(1)
2014–2015	Rad	35	(3)
2015–2016	Kolubara		
- * Club domestic league appearances and goals

Aleksandar Simić (Serbian Cyrillic: Александар Симић; born 31 January 1980) is a Serbian retired footballer who played as a midfielder.

== Club career ==
Simić played for FK Radnički Beograd, OFK Beograd, FC Istres in the French Ligue 2, OFI and AEL. On 8 July 2013 he signed a one-year contract with Iraklis, but he was released just 51 days later, eventually signing a contract with Kerkyra.
