= Souleymane Fall =

Senegalese footballer

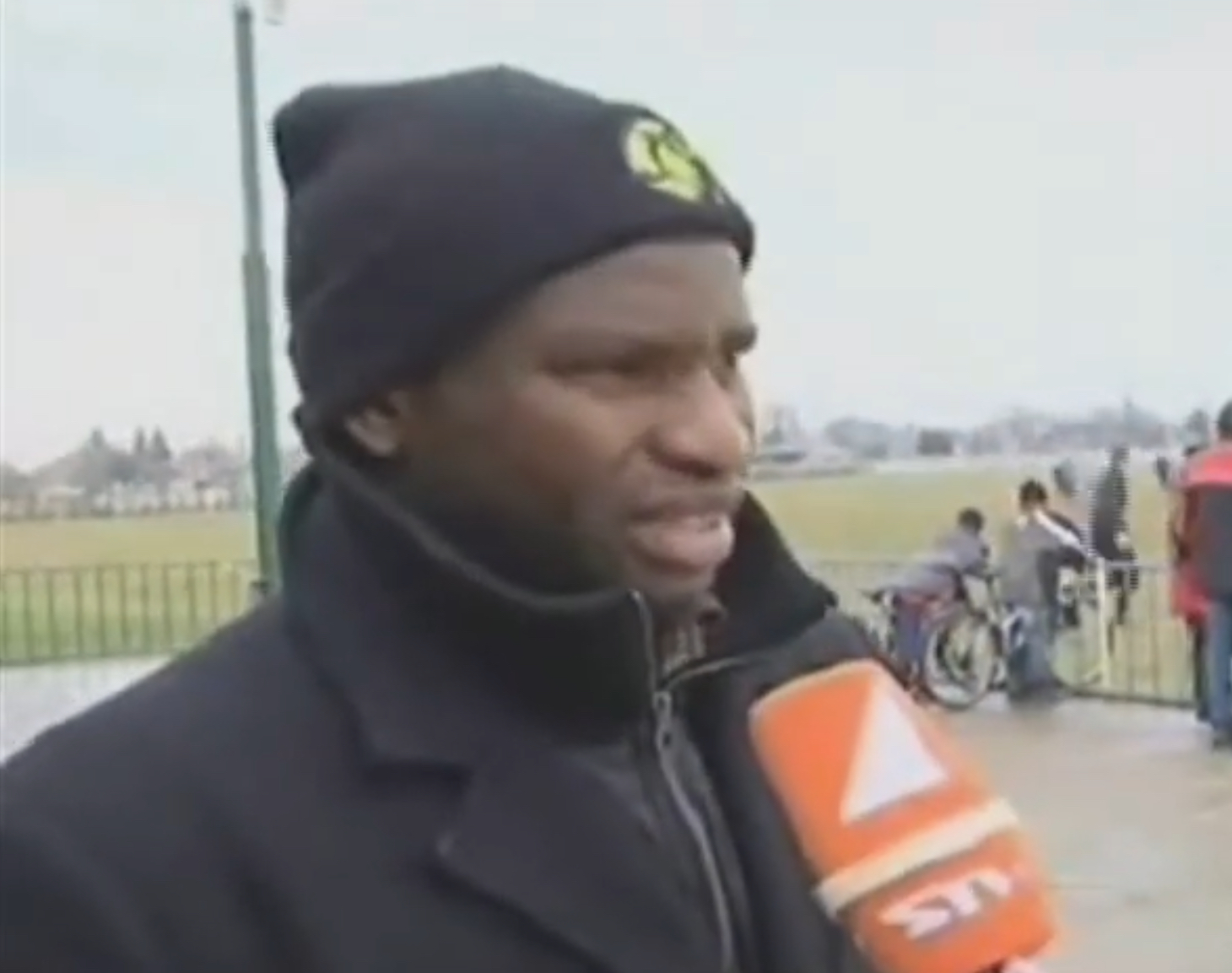

Personal information
- Full name: Souleymane de Sagana Fall
- Date of birth: 19 June 1969 (age 57)
- Place of birth: Dakar, Senegal
- Height: 1.74 m (5 ft 8 1/2 in)
- Position: Right back

Team information
- Current team: ŠK Modranka
- Number: 15

Senior career*
Years	Team	Apps	(Gls)
1994–1996	Zemplín Michalovce		
1996–1998	MFK Jelšava		
1998–1999	Slovan Levice		
1999–2006	Spartak Trnava	188	(18)
2011	ŠK Modranka		
- * Club domestic league appearances and goals as of 13 April 2012

Souleymane Fall (born 19 June 1969 in Dakar) is a former Senegalese football defender who is best known for playing for Spartak Trnava. He most recently played for ŠK Modranka in the Slovak fifth league.
