= Jürgen Raeymaeckers =

Belgian footballer

Personal information
- Date of birth: 3 May 1985 (age 41)
- Place of birth: Herenthout, Belgium
- Height: 1.83 m (6 ft 0 in)
- Position: Striker

Team information
- Current team: K. Lyra T.S.V.
- 1993–2004: Lierse

Senior career*
Years	Team	Apps	(Gls)
2004–2006	Lierse	43	(1)
2006–2007	Roeselare	6	(1)
2007	OH Leuven	3	(0)
2008–2010	Sint-Niklaas	49	(3)
2010	Lille	1	(0)
2011–2013	Zwarte Leeuw	39	(11)
2013–2015	Duffel	28	(5)
2015–	K. Lyra T.S.V.	0	(0)
- * Club domestic league appearances and goals as of 16 August 2012

Jürgen Raeymaeckers (born 3 May 1985) is a Belgian football striker who currently plays for K. Lyra T.S.V. in the lower leagues of Belgian football. Before he played with both Lierse and Roeselare in the Belgian Pro League.

== Career ==
The winger/forward began his professional career with Lierse in 2004, scoring two times in 45 matches, before moving to Roeselare in 2006. As he did not get into the first team there, he left in 2007 to Belgian Second Division team OH Leuven. He left Leuven already few months later and moved to Sint-Niklaas in the Belgian Third Division. At Sint-Niklaas he was a regular, playing 52 matches in total. In 2010, he moved to Lille and afterwards Zwarte Leeuw.
