= Martin Švestka =

Czech footballer (born 1977)

Personal information
- Full name: Martin Švestka
- Date of birth: 27 June 1977 (age 49)
- Place of birth: Czechoslovakia
- Height: 1.86 m (6 ft 1 in)
- Position: Centre back

Team information
- Current team: FC Vítkovice
- Number: 13

Youth career
- FK Hodolany
- Olomouc

Senior career*
Years	Team	Apps	(Gls)
1998–1999	Olomouc		
1999–2001	→Ratíškovice loan		
2000–2002	Drnovice	13	(0)
2002–2005	Dubnica		
2005–2007	Žilina		
2007–2008	Slovan Bratislava		
2008–	Vítkovice		
- * Club domestic league appearances and goals as of 14 July 2011

Martin Švestka (born 27 June 1977) is a Czech football defender who currently plays for club FC Vítkovice.
