= Mikko Simula =

Finnish footballer (born 1973)

Mikko Simula (born 12 May 1973) is a Finnish former professional footballer who played as a midfielder in the Veikkausliiga, for Atlantis FC among other clubs.
