= Roberto Cortellini =

Italian footballer

Personal information
- Date of birth: 19 February 1982 (age 44)
- Place of birth: Brescia, Italy
- Height: 1.82 m (6 ft 0 in)
- Position: Right winger

Youth career
- 1999–2001: Brescia

Senior career*
Years	Team	Apps	(Gls)
2001–2002	Brescia	0	(0)
2002–2004	Lumezzane	47	(2)
2004–2005	Treviso	11	(1)
2005–2007	Brescia	52	(1)
2007–2008	Cesena	24	(2)
2008–2009	→ SPAL (loan)	11	(1)
2009–2010	Modena	27	(1)
2011–2013	FeralpiSalò	68	(2)
2013–2014	Torres	18	(1)
2014–2015	Barletta	34	(3)
2015–2016	Fidelis Andria	31	(1)
2016–2017	AlbinoLeffe	37	(5)
- * Club domestic league appearances and goals as of 22 December 2017

Roberto Cortellini (born 19 February 1982) is an Italian professional footballer who plays as a midfielder.

== Career ==
On 29 July 2015, he was signed by Lega Pro newcomer Fidelis Andria.

== Domestic League Records ==
Year	Competition	Apps	Goal
2001–2002	Serie A	0	0
2004–2011	Serie B	114	5
2002–present	Serie C1	79	3
2011	Serie C2	14	1
Total		207	9
