= Lior Genish =

Israeli footballer

Lior Genish ליאור גניש
Personal information
- Full name: Lior Genish
- Date of birth: October 1, 1980 (age 46)
- Place of birth: Netanya, Israel
- Position: Defender

Youth career
- Maccabi Netanya

Senior career*
Years	Team	Apps	(Gls)
1998–2007	Maccabi Netanya	39	(1)
2006	→ Hapoel Haifa		
2006–2007	→ Sektzia Ness Ziona		
2007	→ Hapoel Herzliya		
- * Club domestic league appearances and goals

Lior Genish (Hebrew: ליאור גניש) is a former Israeli footballer who played in Maccabi Netanya.

== Honours ==
- Israeli Youth Championship:
  - Winner (1): 1994–95
- Youth State Cup:
  - Winner (1): 1996
- Israeli Second Division:
  - Winner (1): 1998-99
