= Otto (disambiguation) =

Otto is a given name of Germanic origin, including a list of persons and fictional characters with the name.

Otto or otto may also refer to:

== Arts and entertainment ==
- Otto – Der Film, a 1985 German film
- Otto; or, Up with Dead People, a 2008 zombie film
- Otto (Greyhawk), a wizard in the World of Greyhawk campaign setting for the Dungeons & Dragons roleplaying game
- Evil Otto, the enemy smiley face from the 1980s video game Berzerk

== Business ==
- Ottomotto, using trade name Otto, an autonomous trucking company
- OTTO Motors, self-driving factory robots
- Otto., Finland's interbank network
- Otto GmbH (Otto Group), a German retailer
- Otto Flugmaschinenfabrik, a 1910s German aircraft manufacturer

== People ==
- Otto the Great (912–973), East Frankish king and Holy Roman Emperor
- Otto II, Holy Roman Emperor (955–983)
- Otto III, Holy Roman Emperor (980–1002)
- Otto IV, Holy Roman Emperor (1175/1176–1218)
- Otto, Count of Cleves (1278–1310)
- Otto, Count of Lippe-Brake (1589–1657)
- Otto, Duke of Lolland and Estonia (1310–1346)
- Otto, Count of Looz (fl. 980-1000)
- Otto, Count of Vermandois (979–1045)
- Otto, Landgrave of Hesse-Kassel (1594–1617)
- Otto, Lord of Arkel (1330–1396)
- Otto, Lord of Lippe (1300–1360)
- Otto, Margrave of the Nordmark (died 1057)
- Otto (singer) (born 1968), Brazilian singer
- Otto Waalkes (born 1948), known mononymously as Otto, German comedian
- Otto (surname)

== Places ==
- Otto, Indiana, US
- Otto, New York, US
- Otto, North Carolina, US
- Otto, West Virginia, US
- Otto, Wyoming, US
- Otto Township (disambiguation)
- Mount Otto, a mountain in Colorado, US
- 2962 Otto, a main-belt asteroid

== World War II ==
- Operation Otto, the Axis operational codename for the 1938 annexation of Austria
- Operation Otto (1943), an Axis 1943 anti-partisan operation in Croatia

== Other uses ==
- Hurricane Otto (disambiguation)
- Otto (dog breed), a breed also known as the Alapaha Blue Blood Bulldog
- Otto the Orange, the mascot of Syracuse University
- Otocinclus, genus of sucking catfish, often known as 'Otto'
- MV Otto, a German coaster
- Otto Celera 500L, an experimental American business and utility aircraft built by Otto Aviation

== See also ==
- Otto cycle, the thermodynamic cycle of a typical reciprocating piston engine
- Otto engine, an early internal combustion engine invented by Nicolaus Otto
- Auto (disambiguation)
- Otho (disambiguation)
- Oto (disambiguation)
- Otto's (disambiguation)
