= Otto (surname) =

Otto is a German, Dutch, Hungarian, Danish, and Swedish surname. Notable people with the surname include:

== Arts and entertainment ==
- Arthur H. Otto (1876–?), Australian organist, composer, singer and music teacher
- Barry Otto (born 1941), Australian actor
- Gertrud Otto (1895–1970) German art historian
- John Otto (drummer) (born 1977), Canadian-born American drummer, original member of the band Limp Bizkit
- John Otto (radio personality) (1929–1999), American radio talk show host
- Justine Otto (born 1974), German artist
- Lisa Otto (1919–2013), German opera singer
- Ludwig Otto (1850—1920), a German landscape painter, etcher and lithographer
- Miranda Otto (born 1967), Australian actress, daughter of Barry
- Natalino Otto (1912–1969), Italian singer
- Ralf Otto (born 1956), German choral conductor and academic teacher
- Shawn Lawrence Otto, American author, filmmaker and political strategist
- Waldemar Otto (1929–2020), Polish-born German sculptor
- Whitney Otto, American author of How to Make an American Quilt
- Otto (composer) (first name unknown, fl. 18th century), composer of the early classical period

== Science and academics ==
- Adolph Wilhelm Otto (1786–1845), German anatomist
- Berthold Otto (1859–1933), German pedagogue
- Catherine Otto, author of echocardiography textbooks
- Christoph Friedrich Otto (1783–1856), German botanist
- Felix Otto (mathematician) (born 1966), German mathematician
- Frank Otto (academic) (1936–2017), American educator and entrepreneur

== Sports ==
- Anita Otto (born 1942), German discus thrower
- Glenn Otto (born 1996), American baseball player
- Hennie Otto (born 1976), South African golfer
- Jim Otto (1938–2024), American football player
- Joel Otto (born 1961), ice hockey player
- John Otto (cyclist) (1900–1966), American Olympic cyclist
- Jonathan Castro Otto (born 1994), Spanish football player
- Kristin Otto (born 1968), German swimmer
- Krynauw Otto (born 1971), South African rugby player
- Ricky Otto (born 1967), English footballer
- Sylke Otto (born 1969), German luger
- Tracy Otto (born 1995), American Paralympic archer
- Werner Otto (cyclist) (born 1948), East German track cyclist
- Werner Otto (footballer) (1929–2025), German (Saarland) footballer

== Other ==
- Charles J. Otto (1964–2025), American politician from Maryland
- Frei Otto (1925–2015), German architect
- Gustav Otto (1883–1926), German aircraft and aircraft-engine designer and manufacturer
- Jan Otto (1841–1916), publisher of Otto's encyclopedia
- John Otto (FBI acting director) (1938–2020), acting director of the FBI in 1987
- John Otto (park ranger) (1870–1952), first superintendent at Colorado National Monument
- John Otto (politician) (1948–2020), American politician
- John Conrad Otto (1774–1844), American physician
- Lena Otto (born 1993), German politician
- Mary Otto, American journalist
- Michael Otto (businessman) (born 1943), German businessman
- Nicolaus Otto (1832–1891), coinventor of the Otto cycle
- Rudolf Otto (1869–1937), German theologian
- Venantia Otto (born 1987), Namibian fashion model
- William Tod Otto (1816–1905), American judge
- Walter Friedrich Otto (1874–1958), German philologist

== See also ==
- Otto, given name
- Otto (disambiguation), other uses
