= Nuvrei =

Bakery in Portland, Oregon, U.S.

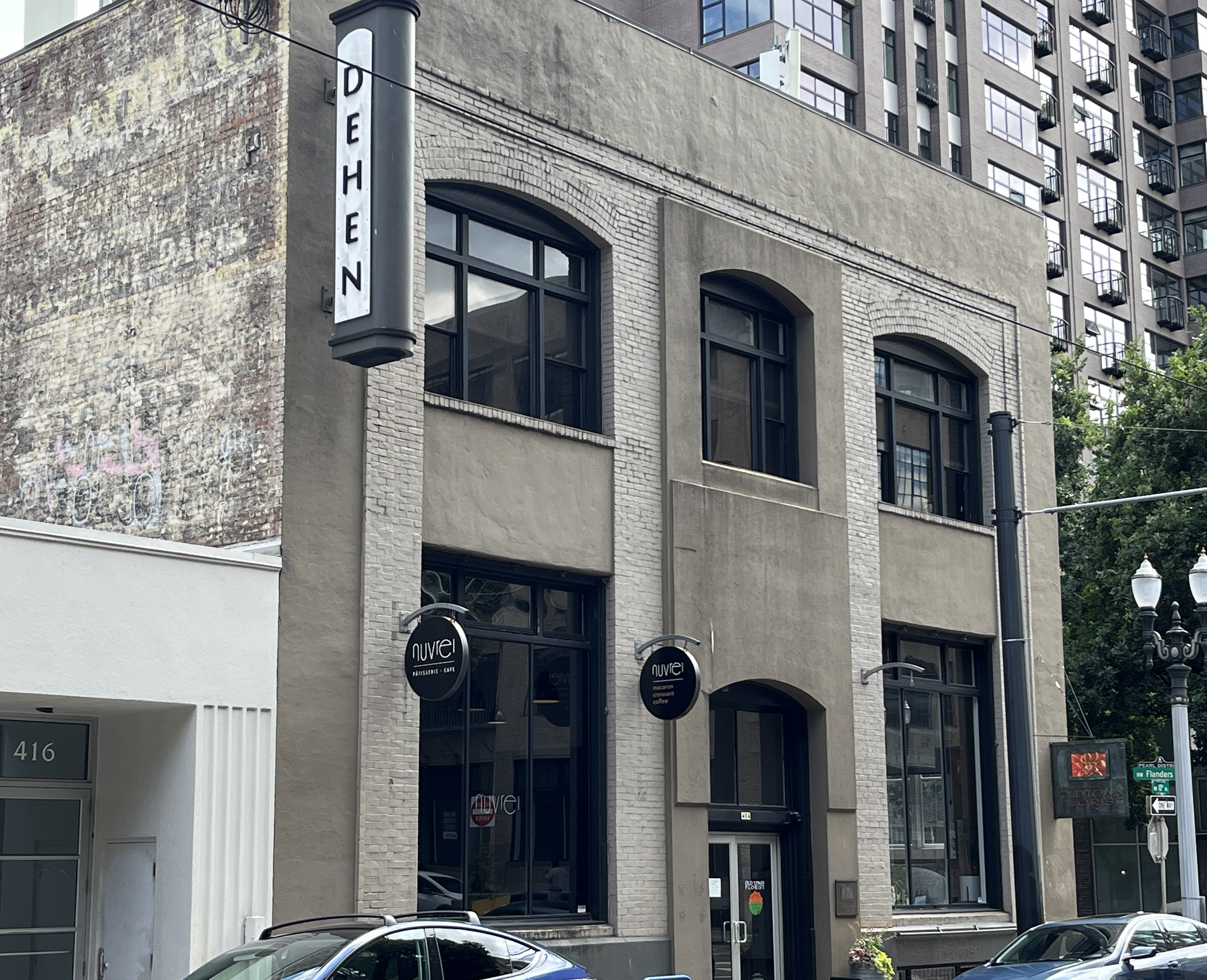
- Exterior, 2025
- Interactive map of Nuvrei

Restaurant information
- Owner: Marius Pop
- Location: 404 Northwest 10th Avenue, Portland, Multnomah, Oregon, United States
- Coordinates: 45°31′33.7″N 122°40′51.9″W
- Website: nuvrei.com

Nuvrei (also known as Nuvrei Bakery, Nuvrei Patisserie and Cafe, and Nuvrei Pastries) is a bakery in Portland, Oregon, United States.

== Description and history ==
Nuvrei is a pâtisserie in northwest Portland's Pearl District. The menu has included macarons, pretzel croissants, and sandwiches.

The business is owned by Marius Pop. In 2010, Nuvrei announced plans to open an upstairs cafe. The cafe opened in October 2011. Paul Losch was announced as chef in 2012. In early 2014, Nuvrei announced plans to open Macaron Bar (or "Mac Bar") downstairs. The upstairs cafe closed temporarily for renovations in January 2015; during this time seating was expanded in the downstairs Brioche Week and the business launched Brioche Week to offer additional pastries. In May, Nuvrei reopened with a new aesthetic and a "totally revamped menu with a new, much more intense emphasis on pastries".

Heart Coffee Roasters began serving Nuvrei pastries in 2015. Nuvrei expanded with a second location in 2016; no seating was offered when the new concept Pop Bagel opened in the lobby of the U.S Bancorp Tower.

== Reception ==
Kara Stokes and Michelle Lopez included Nuvrei's walnut cookie in Eater Portland's 2019 list of Portland's "most unforgettable" cookies". In her 2020 overview of "worthy" eateries near TriMet stations, the website's Brooke Jackson-Glidden wrote, "This pristine, charming bakery is the place to be for artful, crispy croissants of countless flavors, pretty little macarons, and one hell of a chewy walnut cookie." She also included Nuvrei in an overview of recommended breakfast and brunch options for delivery or take-out in Portland, which was published in 2020 during the COVID-19 pandemic. In 2021, Lopez included the bakery in an overview of "where to find flaky, crackly croissants in Portland", and she and Jackson-Glidden included Nuvrei in a list of "outstanding" bakeries in the Portland metropolitan area. Kara Stokes and Maya MacEvoy included Nuvrei in a 2022 list of recommended eateries in the Pearl District. Lopez and Janey Wong included the business in Eater Portland's 2025 overview of the city's best bakeries.

== See also ==
- List of bakeries
