= Auto driver =

Auto driver or Auto Driver may refer to:

- Auto driver, a driver in auto racing
- Auto driver, a driver of an auto rickshaw
  - Auto Driver, a 1998 Indian Telugu-language romance film
  - Auto Driver (2015 film), an Indian documentary

== See also ==
- Auto (disambiguation)
- Driver (disambiguation)
- Self-driving car
