= Otho (disambiguation) =

- Otho (32–69 AD) was an emperor of the Roman Empire.

Otho may also refer to:

== People ==
- Lucius Salvius Otho, father of Roman emperor Otho
- Variant of the German name Otto
  - Otho, a saint and companion in martyrdom to Berard of Carbio
  - Otto of Greece (1815–1867), King of Greece
  - Otho Clark (1889–1974), American football player
  - Otho Cushing (1870-1942), American artist
  - Otho Davis (1934–2000), trainer for the Baltimore Colts
  - Lord Otho FitzGerald (1827–1882), member of the British Parliament
  - Otho Nitcholas (1908–1986), American baseball player
  - Otho Prior-Palmer (1897–1986), member of the British Parliament for Worthing
  - Valentinus Otho or Valentin Otto (died 1603), German mathematician and astronomer
  - Otho de Lagery, Pope Urban II
  - Otto of Montferrat (disambiguation), several people whose names were anglicized as Otho

== Others ==
- Otho, Alabama, United States
- Otho, Iowa, United States
- short for the Otho-Corpus Gospels, a fragmentary illuminated manuscript
- Otho, a character in the Deverry Cycle book series
- Otho (beetle), a genus of insects in the family Eucnemidae

== See also ==
- Otto (disambiguation)
