= Cloud City Ice Cream =

Ice cream parlor in Portland, Oregon, U.S.

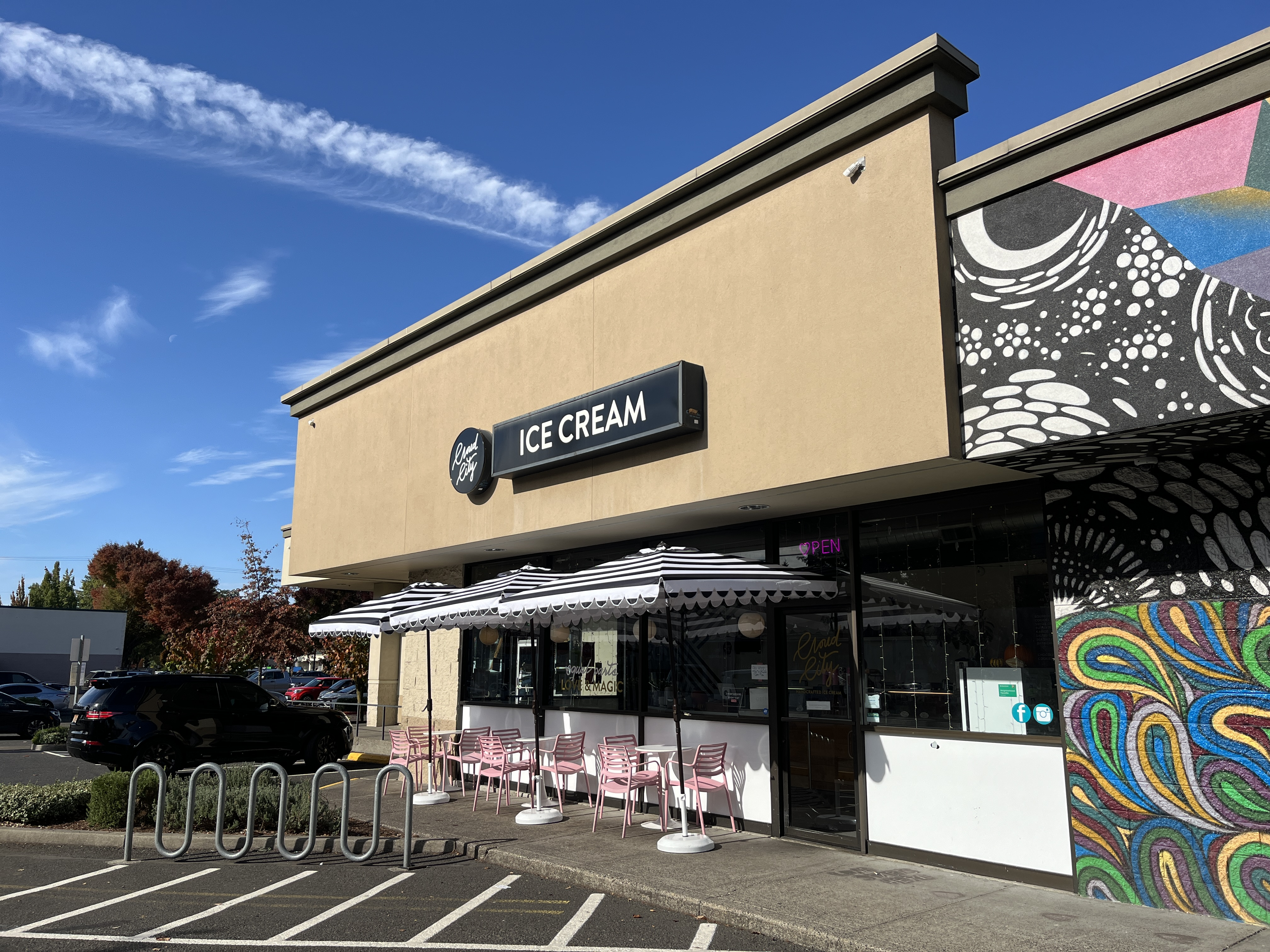
- The ice cream parlor's exterior, 2024
- Interactive map of Cloud City Ice Cream

Restaurant information
- Established: 2011; 15 years ago
- Owners: Bryan and Sarah Gilbert
- Pastry chef: Andrea Bowers
- Food type: Ice cream; desserts
- Location: 4525 Southeast Woodstock Boulevard, Portland, Multnomah, Oregon, 97206, United States
- Coordinates: 45.4795°N 122.6160°W
- Website: cloudcityicecream.com

Cloud City Ice Cream is an ice cream parlor in Portland, Oregon, United States. Spouses Bryan and Sarah Gilbert opened the restaurant in southeast Portland's Woodstock neighborhood in 2011.

== Description ==
Cloud City Ice Cream is an ice cream parlor in southeast Portland's Woodstock neighborhood. The menu includes ice cream cake, ice cream sandwiches ("Pie Creams"), and the Unicone (a sugar cone dipped in white chocolate, with ice cream and sprinkles). The Cherry Bomb has tart cherry ice cream and a vanilla pie crust. The Malted French Silk has malted chocolate ice cream and a dark chocolate pie crust. The Snappy Goat ice cream sandwich has lemon goat cheese ice cream with a ginger snap pie crust.

Ice cream cakes have included the Ginger Pumpkin Chai, the Malted Chocolate Cherry Bomb, and the Mexican Coca-Cola Cake, which has dark chocolate butter cake, vanilla chiffon cake, caramel ice cream, cinnamon buttercream, and a dark chocolate glaze. Drink options include coffee (Stumptown Coffee Roasters), hot chocolate, ice cream floats, and milkshakes. Waffle cones are made on site.

The Stumptown (coffee) ice cream flavor was the most popular, as of 2012. Other ice cream flavors have included butter pecan, cookies and cream, honey lavender, pistachio, sea salt cookie dough, Grilled Peach Sweet Tea, and Sasquatch Tracks. Circus Friends has Mother's Circus Animal Cookies and sweet cream, and Totes Ma'Goats has goat cheese ice cream with lemon curd. The Sunshine is a vegan option and has cardamom, cinnamon, turmeric, and Thai coconut milk. The Bourbon Vanilla uses Burnside Bourbon and the Chocolate Stout flavor uses Hopworks Urban Brewery's Survival Stout beer.

== History ==
Spouses Bryan and Sarah Gilbert opened Cloud City Ice Cream in 2011. The business replaced Chill Ice Cream, which was sold following the deaths of the owners earlier in the year. The ice cream parlor Surf Shack operated in the same space prior to Chill Ice Cream. Andrea Bowers was Cloud City's initial pastry chef. The company's logo and business cards were designed by local artist Guita Anderson.

In July 2026, Cloud City was among six ice creameries in the Portland metropolitan area to offer special cherry-inspired options for the month as part of the "Northwest Cherry Trail". In October, Cloud City along with nearby restaurants Ate-Oh-Ate and Double Mountain Brewery changed select menu items to protest the possible closure of Lewis Elementary. Cloud City renamed its Sea Salt Cookie Dough ice cream to "S.O.S. Dough Not Close Lewis".

On October 27, 2026, the business launched a fundraiser and asked for financial support from the community, hoping to raise at least $60,000 to continue operating. The business cited a temporary closure in 2024 because of an equipment failure as one reason for the financial strain. The $60,000 goal was reached within three days.

== Reception ==
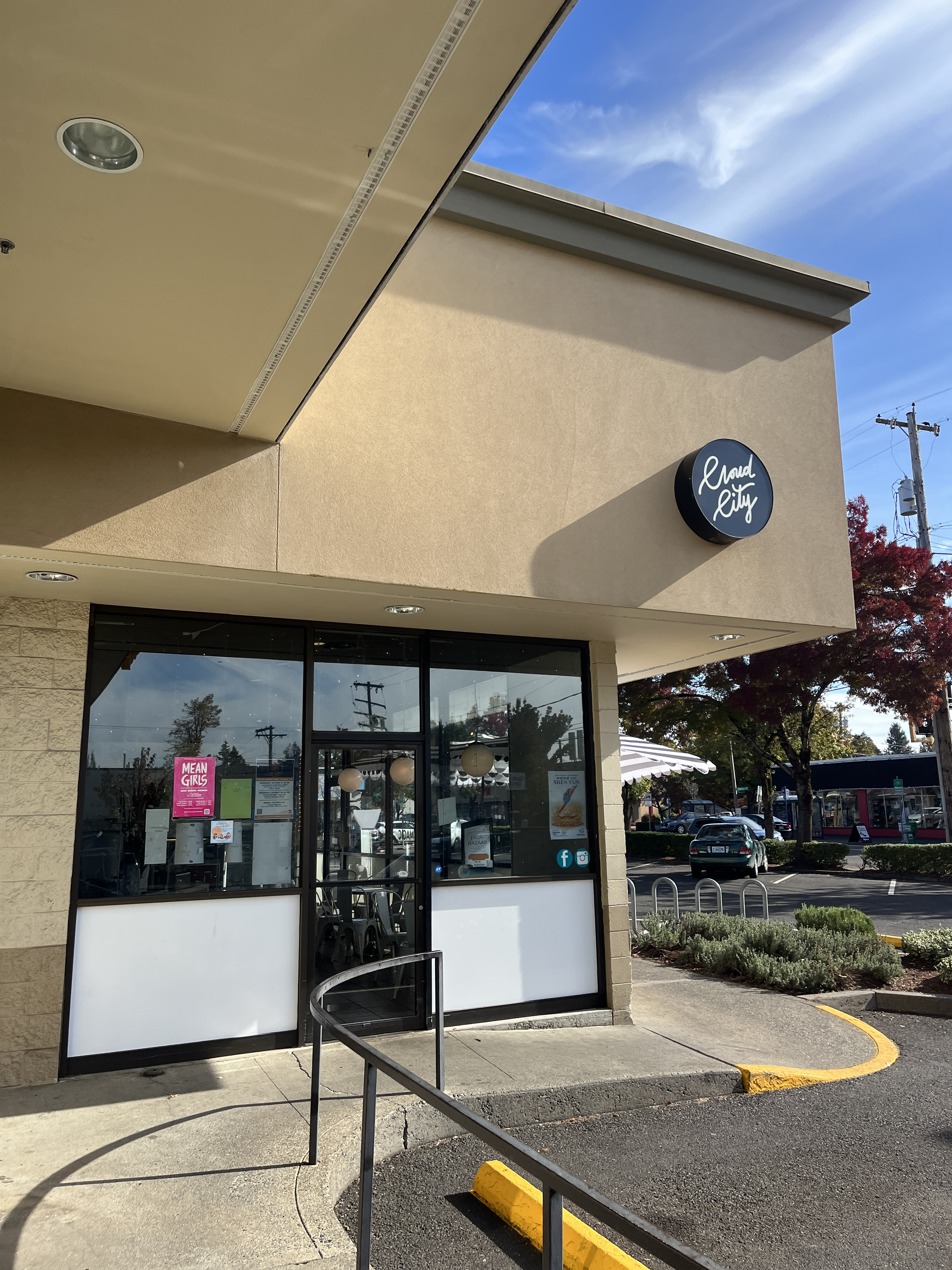
The shop's exterior in 2024

In 2012, Nora Eileen Jones of Willamette Week said of the chocolate stout ice cream with Hopworks, "It was insanely good and surprisingly refreshing for a chocolate ice cream—the stout in the mixture added some tiny yet welcome ice crystals to the thick confection. It's a very mature flavor, with more rich darkness to it than your average chocolate ice cream." Lizzy Acker recommended the Totes Ma'Goats and Sunshine flavors in The Oregonian's 2018 list of "23 of the best frozen treats from around Portland you need to try this summer". Cloud City ranked first in the best ice cream category of the newspaper's Readers Choice Awards in 2024. Acker included the business in The Oregonian's 2025 overview of Portland's five best ice cream establishments.

Darcy Schild selected Cloud City for Oregon in Business Insider's 2019 list of the best ice cream shops in each U.S. state. Pete Cottell included Cloud City in Thrillist's 2019 list of Portland's "most essential spots" for ice cream. He said the business was "perhaps the newest superstar in the Portland ice cream scene" and wrote, "It's rare that a nouveau riche ice cream boutique manages to impress both adults and children in equal measure, but Cloud City continually knocks it out of the park for tastes that are at once juvenile, sophisticated, and that weird grey area in between." Michelle Lopez and Brooke Jackson-Glidden included Cloud City in Eater Portland's 2021 list of "supremely tasty" ice cream, writing:

Those craving nostalgic flavors like cookies n' cream and chocolate chip cookie dough head directly for Cloud City when the time comes. This Woodstock spot balances memorable classics with kid-friendly touches, like ice cream studded with frosted animal cracker cookies and red velvet mascarpone cake. Although Cloud City is located within a nondescript strip mall parking lot, plenty of families still take advantage of its outdoor seating, making the shop a lively neighborhood staple.

The website's Nathan Williams recommended Cloud City in a 2022 overview of eateries in the Woodstock neighborhood. KOIN included Cloud City in a 2023 list of the Portland metropolitan area's top ten ice cream shops, based on Yelp reviews for businesses with no more than three locations. The station included Cloud City in a similar list of the city's best ice cream shops in 2025.
