= Country Bill's =

Defunct restaurant in Portland, Oregon, U.S.

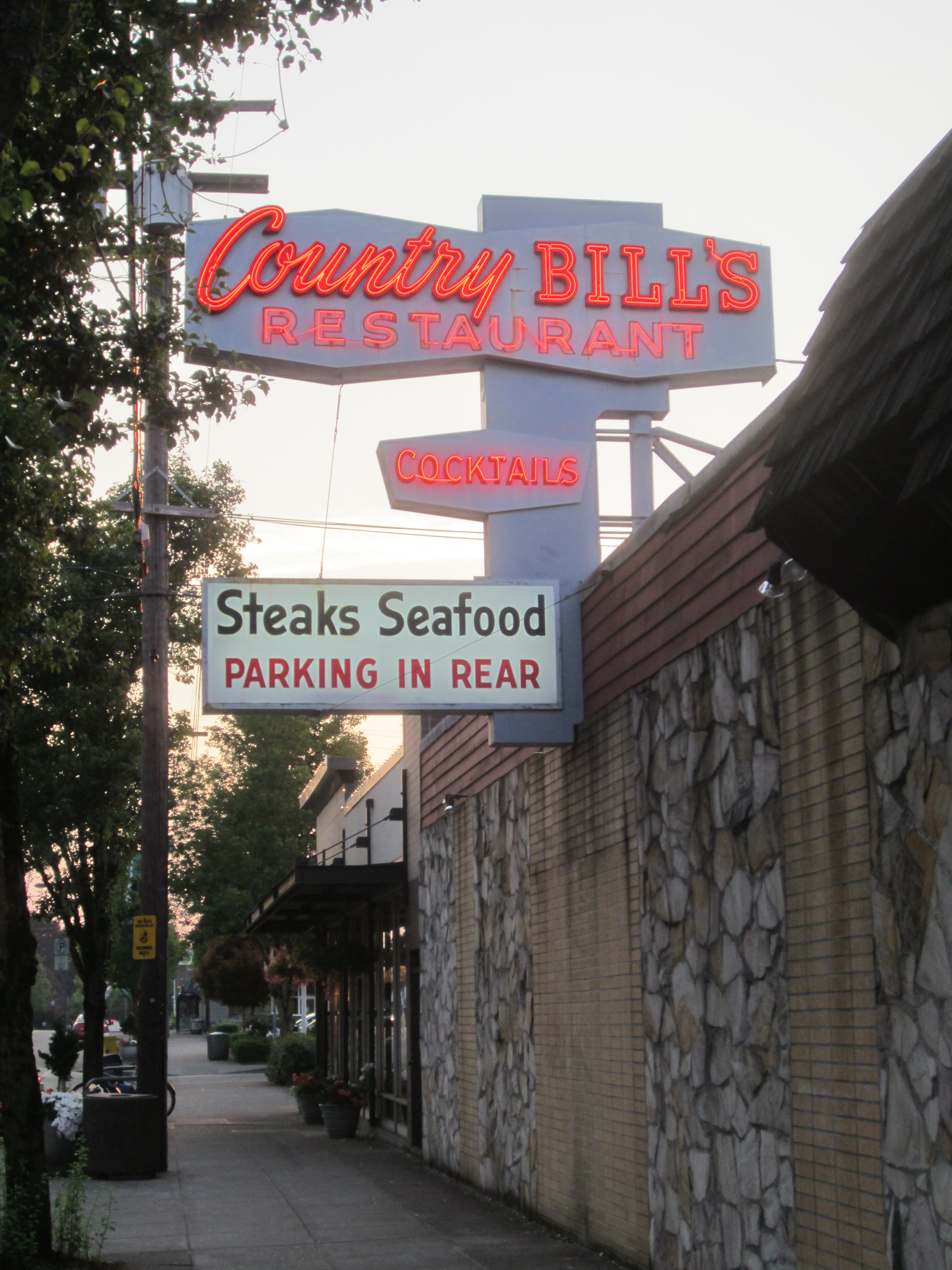
- The restaurant in August 2012, one month before closing
- Interactive map of Country Bill's

Restaurant information
- Established: 1964; 62 years ago
- Closed: September 15, 2012; 14 years ago
- Owners: Ron Thomas; Craig Thomas
- Food type: American; seafood
- Dress code: Casual
- Location: 4415 Southeast Woodstock Boulevard, Portland, Multnomah, Oregon, 97206, United States
- Coordinates: 45°28′45.49″N 122°37′00.40″W

Country Bill's Restaurant was a family-owned American-style steakhouse and seafood restaurant in the Woodstock neighborhood of Portland, Oregon, in the United States. Adjacent to the restaurant was a bar called CB's Lounge. The restaurant opened in 1964 when ownership transferred from Bill Blake to Ron Thomas' family. Though Thomas was not particularly fond of the name of the business Blake had established in 1960, he was unable to afford new signage and kept the lounge's title. Over time the restaurant grew from a hamburger stand into a family dining restaurant, expanding from one space to four. In 1978, the family purchased the building and property following the landlord's death.

Eventually, Thomas transferred the business to one of his two sons, Craig. Craig and his wife decided to retire in 2011 and none of their children wanted to continue operating the restaurant. The business and the 5,300-square-foot (490 m^{2}) building were listed for sale in February 2011. Country Bill's closed in September 2012 after 48 years of operation.

The restaurant had low staff turnover and dedicated patrons, hundreds of whom visited during its final days. Country Bill's was also known for its Brat Pack era decor, including red clamshell booths, mood lighting supplied by electric candles, metallic wallpaper and wood paneling. Following closure, the building underwent interior and exterior renovation to make spaces available for new tenants.

== Description ==
Country Bill's operated on Woodstock Boulevard in southeast Portland's Woodstock neighborhood. It served American food, originally operating as a hamburger stand, before becoming a steakhouse and seafood restaurant. The menu included prime rib, razor clams, and steelhead; meals were accompanied by soup or salad and a potato as sides. Slot machines were available on site but the business made 70 percent of its income from food. Adjacent to the restaurant was a bar reminiscent of the Brat Pack era called CB's Lounge.

== History ==
Country Bill's Restaurant opened in 1964 after Ron Thomas' family purchased the business from Bill Blake for $600. Blake had named his lounge Country Bill's in 1960 but the business was unsuccessful. Thomas had been in the food service industry in Utah previously and ended up living in Portland after a series of relocations with his family. Though he was not fond of the lounge's name, Thomas was unable to afford new signage and kept the title. Over time the restaurant grew from a hamburger stand into a family dining restaurant, expanding east from one space to four. In 1978, the family purchased the building and property following the death of their landlord.

Ownership stayed within the family, eventually transferring to Craig Thomas, one of Ron's two sons, both of whom worked in the restaurant for numerous years. Craig Thomas and his wife decided to retire in 2011 and none of their children wanted to continue operating the restaurant. In February 2011, Country Bill's and the 5,300-square-foot (490 m^{2}) building were listed for sale for $975,000. The restaurant closed on September 15, 2012, after 48 years of operation. Hundreds of customers, some from as far away as Europe, visited the restaurant during its final days.

Following the restaurant's closing in 2012, the building underwent interior and exterior renovation, resulting in two spaces for future tenants, one of which has been confirmed as a dental office.

== Reception ==
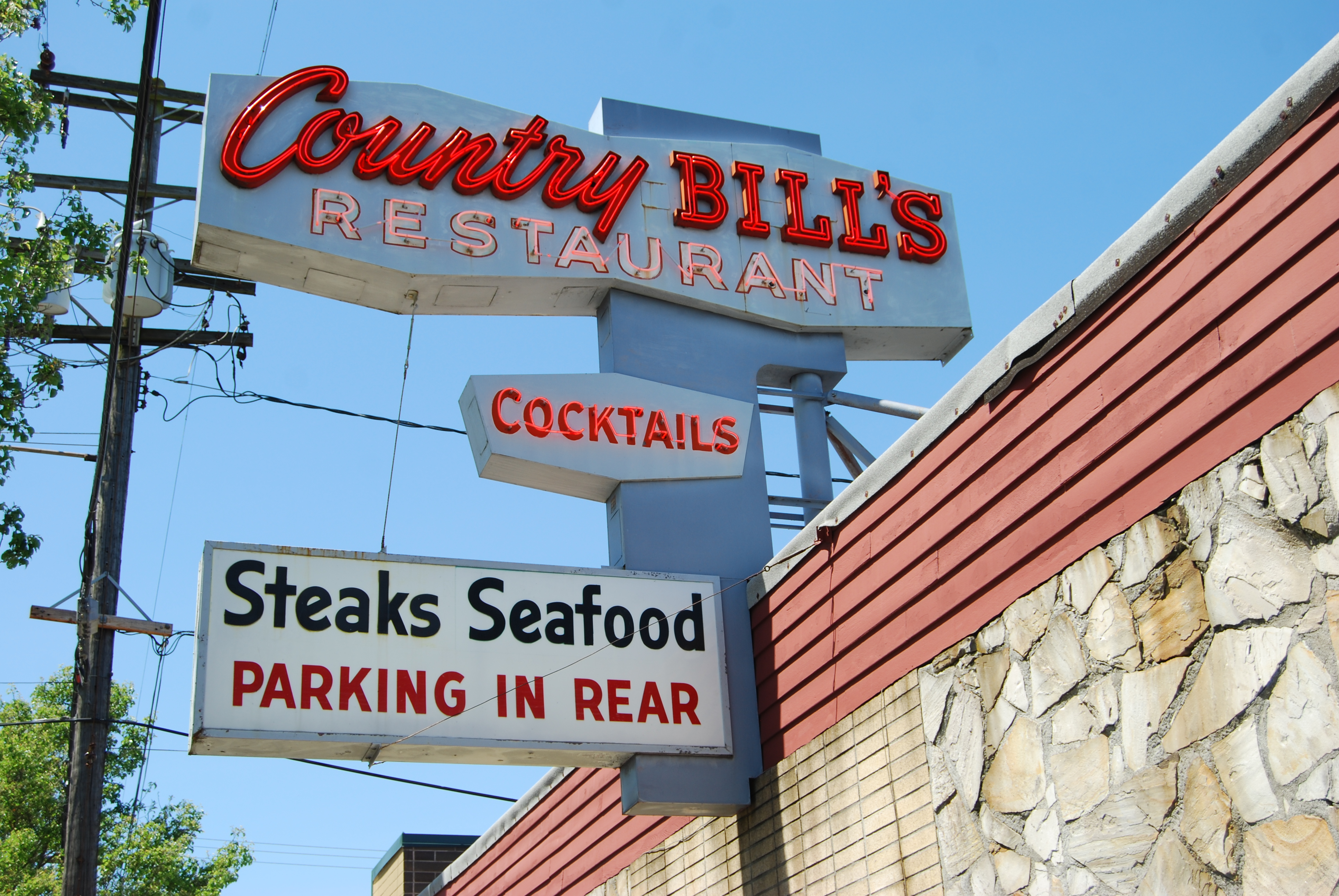
Restaurant signage in 2009

In his review for Willamette Week, Ben Waterhouse asserted that the restaurant had changed little since its establishment. Waterhouse stated "time travel" was Country Bill's form of entertainment, noting its red vinyl booths, wood paneling and "white-haired" clientele. He recommended ordering beer or spirits (specifically Anchor Steam) as opposed to cocktails, which he found contained too much sugar. Mix magazine reviewed Country Bill's as one of "five vintage restaurants that have stood the test of time". In his review, Michael Russell described CB's Lounge's red clamshell booths, electric candles and the servers "who alternate between alarmingly fresh-faced and downright sassy". Russell recommended the hand-cut garlic French fries and deep fried cheesecake, which he described as "country-fair gluttony incarnate". The Portland Mercury also described the restaurant's retro features such as the plush red booths, mood lighting and metallic wallpaper. The publication also noted the older waiting staff.

Country Bill's was known for its low staff turnover and dedicated patrons. According to Craig Thomas, the family's formula for success included a hard work ethic, loyal staff and a "common-sense approach" to business. The cook worked for the restaurant for 43 years, starting at age 16. Longtime customers and employees reportedly felt its closing was "almost like losing a family member". The Oregonian wrote about Country Bill's last days in articles about local restaurant and economic news, noting the business's longevity.

== See also ==
- List of seafood restaurants
