= Bridge City Pizza =

Defunct restaurant in Portland, Oregon, U.S.

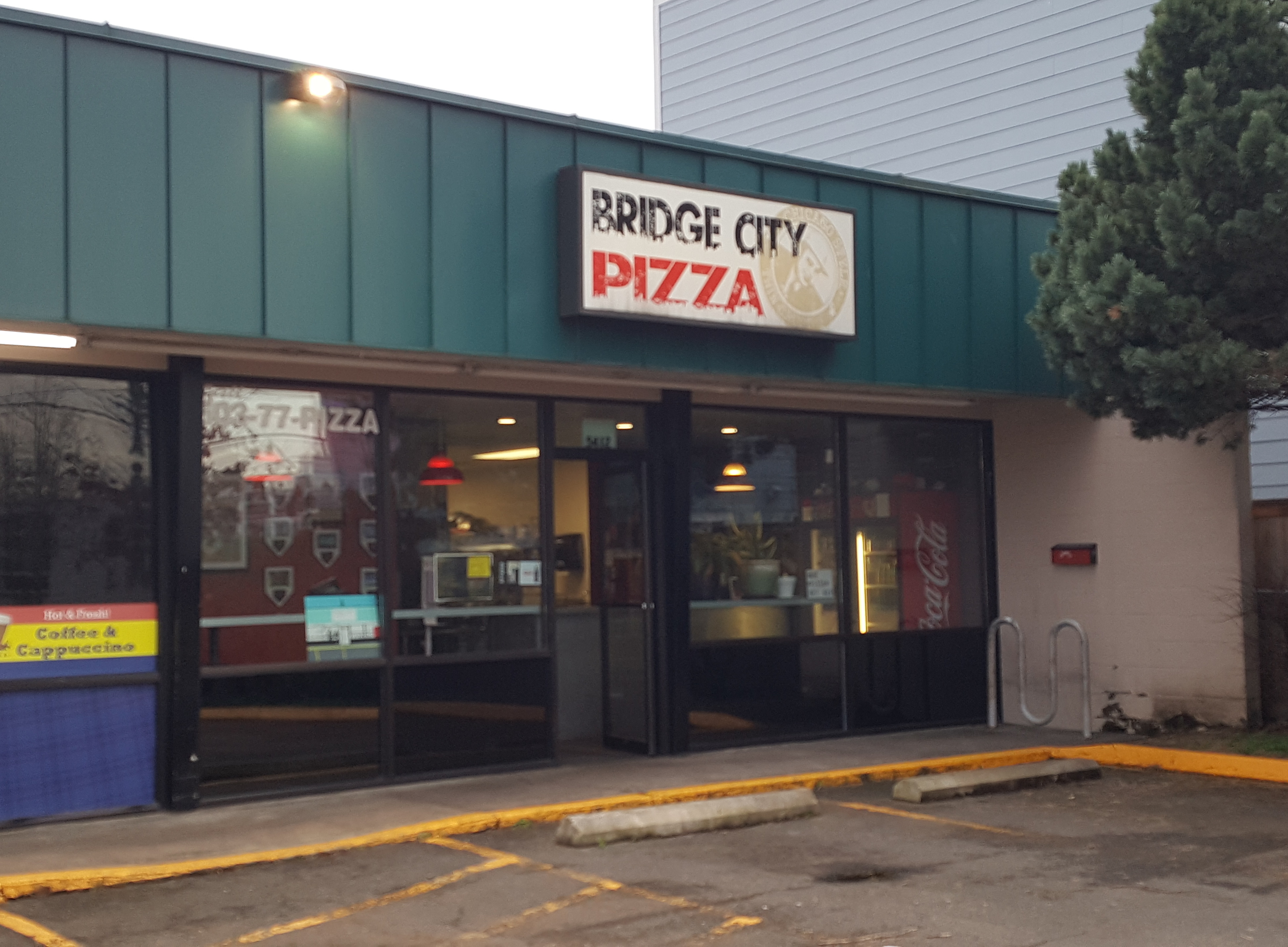
- The restaurant's exterior in 2022
- Interactive map of Bridge City Pizza

Restaurant information
- Closed: January 2026
- Location: 5412 Southeast Woodstock Boulevard, Portland, Multnomah, Oregon, 97206, United States
- Coordinates: 45.4789°N 122.6071°W
- Website: bridgecitypizza.com

Bridge City Pizza was a pizzeria and sandwich restaurant in Portland, Oregon's Woodstock neighborhood, in the United States. It closed permanently in January 2026.

== Description ==
Bridge City Pizza was a restaurant serving Chicago-style pizza and sandwiches in southeast Portland's Woodstock neighborhood. The delivery-focused business had a small storefront and counter with six stools available for on-site dining, as of 2016. Behind the counter were paintings depicting Al Capone and The Blues Brothers.

Alison Hallett of the Portland Mercury described the pizza as "tavern-style" (thin crust, cut into squares). Pizzas ranged from 10 to 18 inches in diameter. Red sauce and toppings (including giardiniera) were made on site. The Willie the Wimp and His Cadillac Hawaiian had pineapple, the Chicago Fire had bacon, jalapeño and pork sausage, and the Big Hurt had ham, pepperoni, peppers, and portobello mushrooms. Bridge City also had a gluten-free pizza. Sandwiches included Italian beef with au jus, meatball marinara, and the Froman (sausage). Sides included garlic breadsticks named after Elwood Blues, mozzarella sticks, fried mashed potato balls named after Coach K.

== History ==
Bridge City Pizza was operated by "thickly, hilariously accented" former Chicago residents. For Pizza Week in 2016, the restaurant served a pizza called The Antonio Abate. Named after the "patron saint of pizza makers" and cut into triangles, the pizza had barbecue chicken, bacon, Alabama white sauce, and sweet pickled vegetables.

The pizzeria closed permanently in January 2026. On social media, the business said, " We would like to thank Portland and especially our favorite neighborhood Woodstock for a wonderful 14 years. We are proud to have served you."

== Reception ==
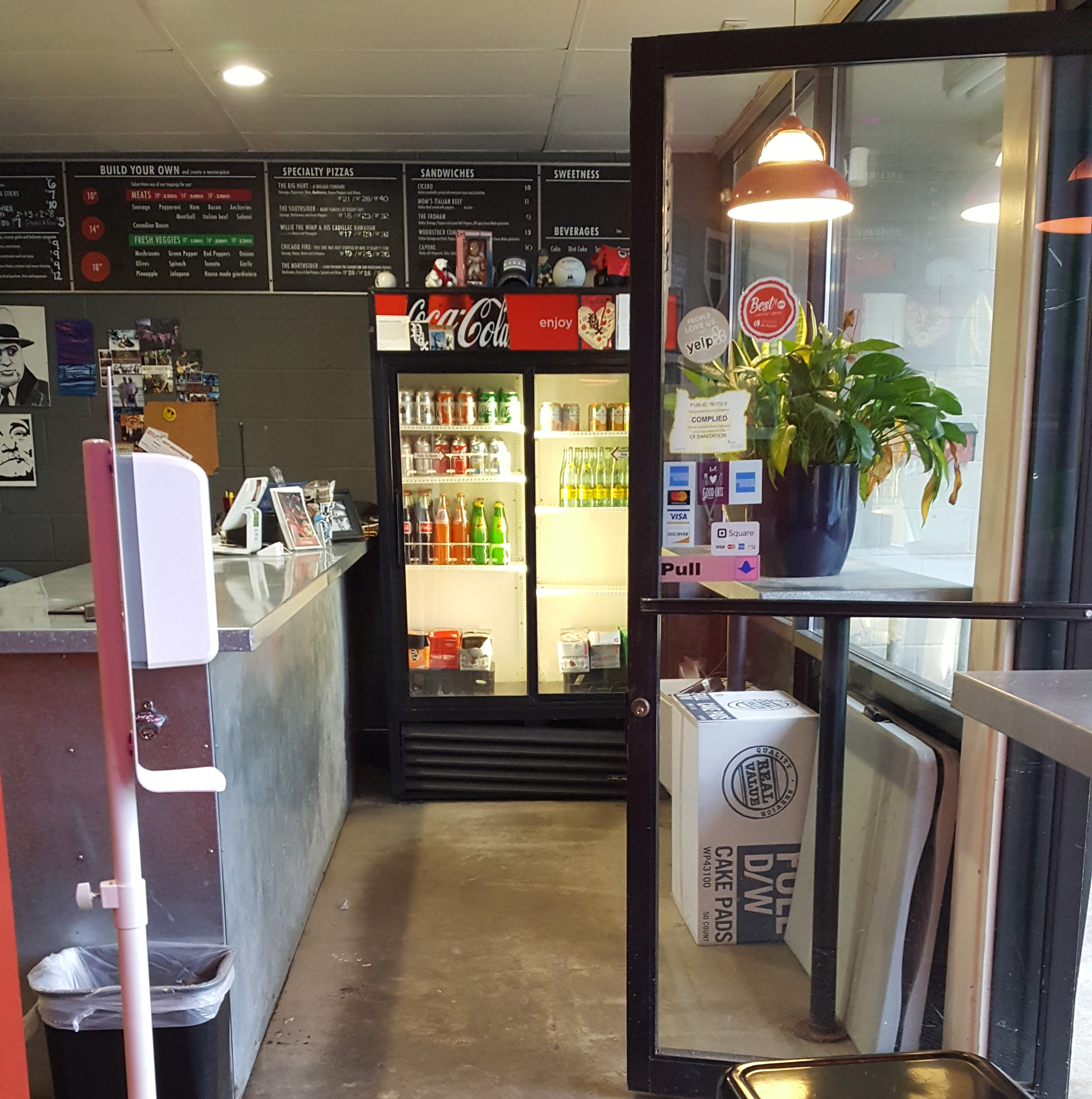
The restaurant's interior in January 2022, during the COVID-19 pandemic

In 2014, Samantha Bakall of The Oregonian said Bridge City "happens to make the best Italian beef sandwich in the city, and it's not even close". Similarly, Willamette Week said the restaurant "makes what might be the best Italian Beef in town right now". Thrillist's Andy Kryza said Bridge City had Portland's best Chicago-style pizza in 2015. In 2016, Bakall recommend the Italian beef and said Bridge City "is worth a visit for any Chicago-Portland transplants homesick for Italian beef sandwiches and square-cut 'za". She also included the sandwich in her 2017 list of southeast Portland's 39 best "cheap eats".

In 2016, the Portland Mercury's Alison Hallett called The Antonio Abate "hearty, filling, and deeply satisfying introduction to a pizza style that's hard to come by in Portland". Matthew Singer of Willamette Week called the sandwiches "gloriously gloppy monstrosities that bleed juice straight through the wrapping", and recommend the Italian beef. In late 2021, Eater Portland invited writers to share headline predictions for 2022. One of Bill Oakley's headlines read, "Portland Food Press Finally Notices Bridge City Pizza Which Has Been Making Absolutely Terrific Tavern-Style Pizza for Years But Getting Zero Attention". The website's Nathan Williams recommended Bridge City in an overview of eateries in the Woodstock neighborhood.

== See also ==
- List of defunct restaurants of the United States
- Pizza in Portland, Oregon
