= Otto's =

Otto's may refer to:

- Otto's encyclopedia, the largest encyclopedia written in Czech
- Otto's Sausage Kitchen, Portland, Oregon, United States
- Otto's sportive lemur
