= Woodstock, Portland, Oregon =

Woodstock
- Neighborhood
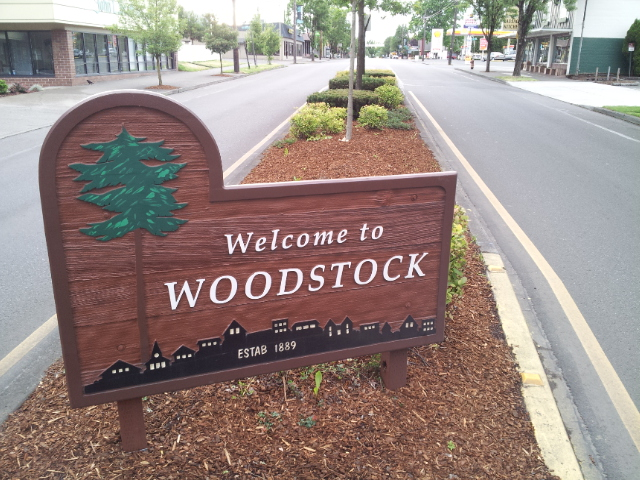
- Location in Portland
- Coordinates: 45°29′N 122°37′W
- Country: United States
- State: Oregon
- City: Portland

Government
  - Association: Woodstock Neighborhood Association
  - Coalition: Southeast Uplift

Area
  - Total: 1.30 sq mi (3.37 km^{2})

Population (2000)
  - Total: 8,472
  - Density: 6,510/sq mi (2,510/km^{2})

Housing
  - No. of households: 3652
  - Occupancy rate: 96% occupied
  - Owner-occupied: 2705 households (74%)
  - Renting: 947 households (26%)
  - Avg. household size: 2.32 persons

Woodstock is a neighborhood located in inner Southeast Portland, Oregon, United States. It is one of the city's oldest neighborhoods, platted in 1889. Notable buildings include the Woodstock Community Center, the Woodstock Library, and Woodstock School.

Woodstock is bounded on the north by Holgate Boulevard, east by 45th and 60th Streets, south by Johnson Creek, and west by Cesar E. Chavez Boulevard (formerly 39th Avenue). Woodstock borders the neighborhoods of Reed and Eastmoreland on the west, Creston-Kenilworth on the north, Mt. Scott-Arleta and Brentwood-Darlington on the east, and Ardenwald-Johnson Creek on the south.

== Description ==
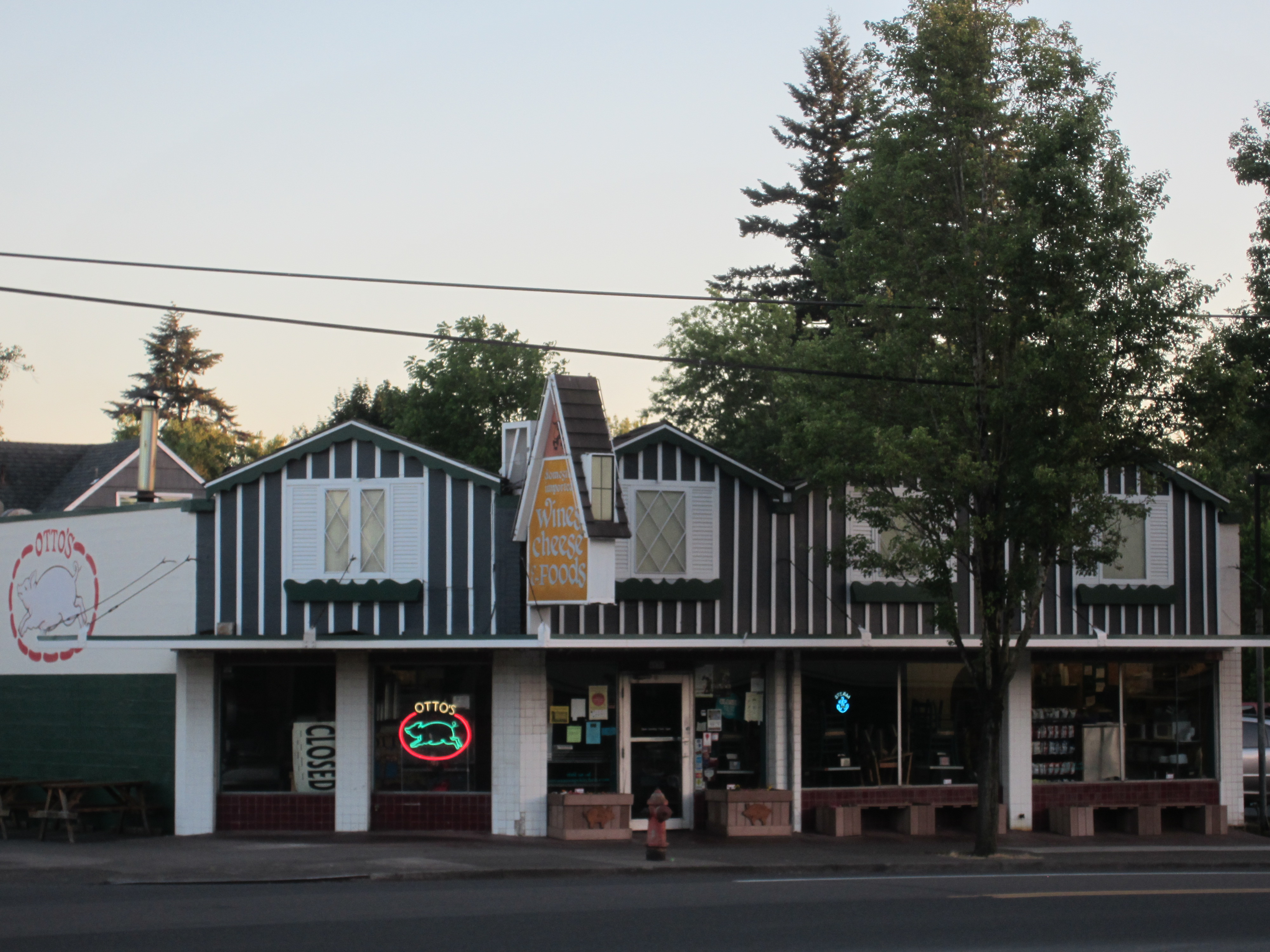
Otto's Sausage Kitchen

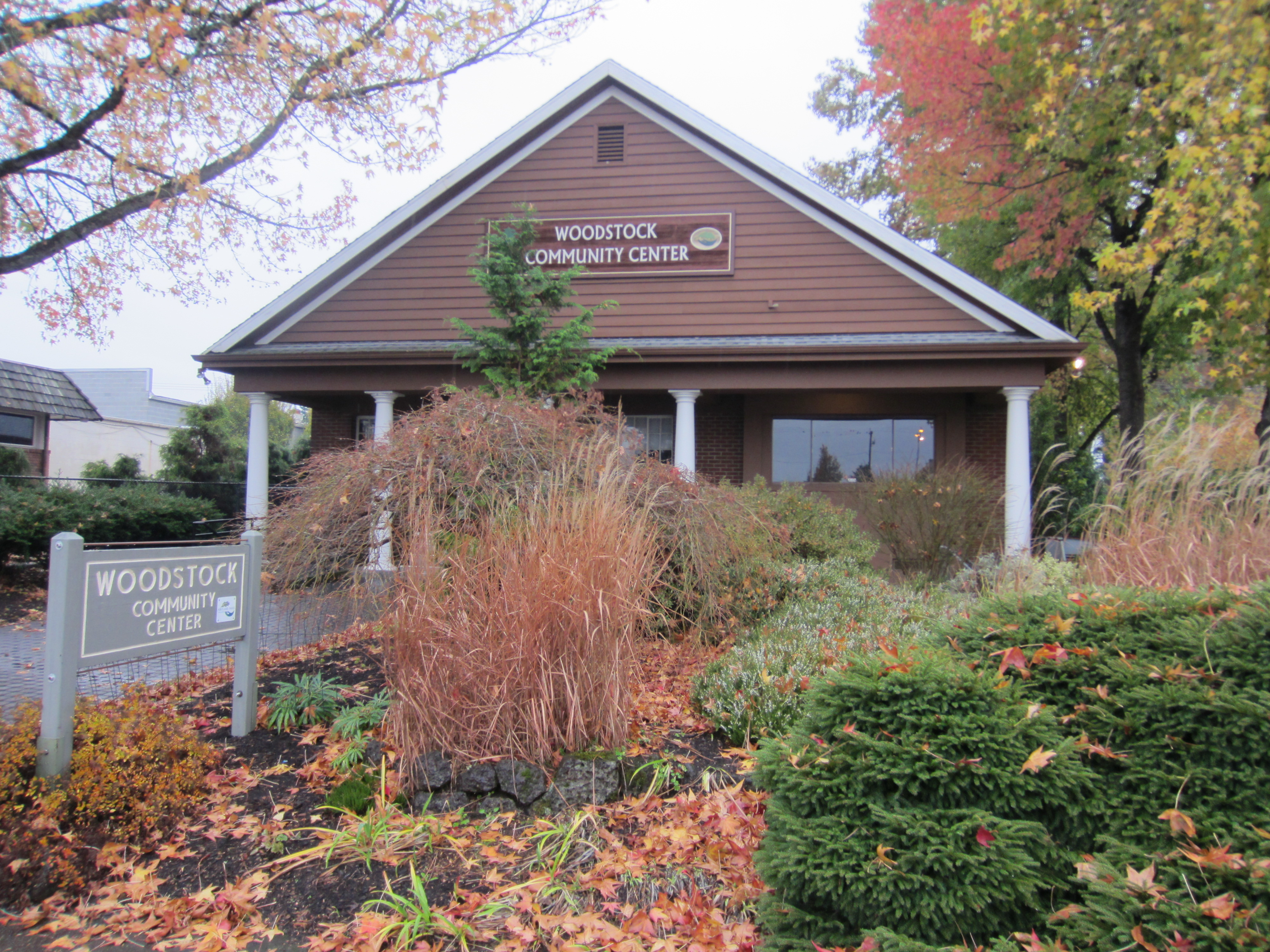
Woodstock Community Center

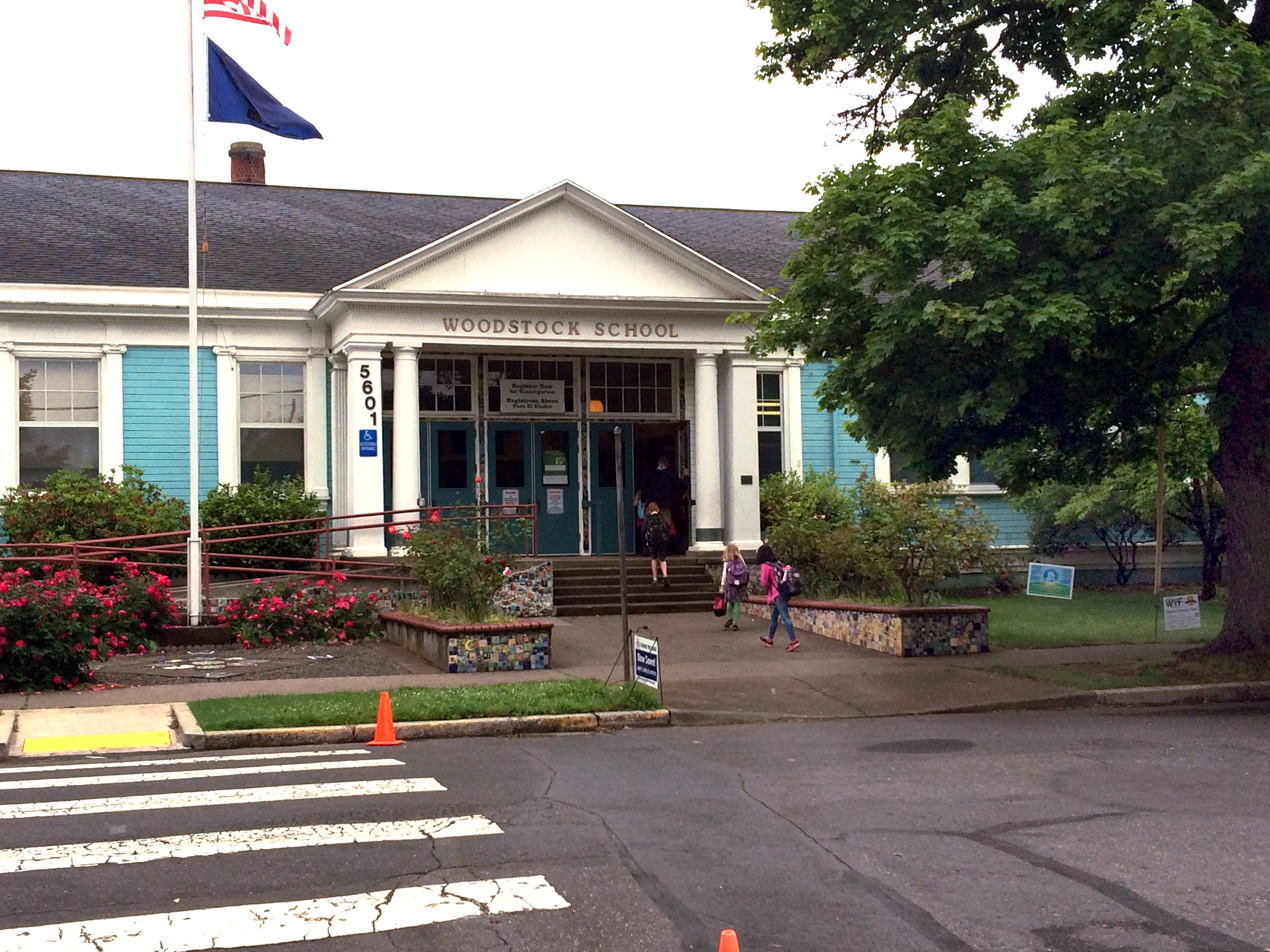
Woodstock School

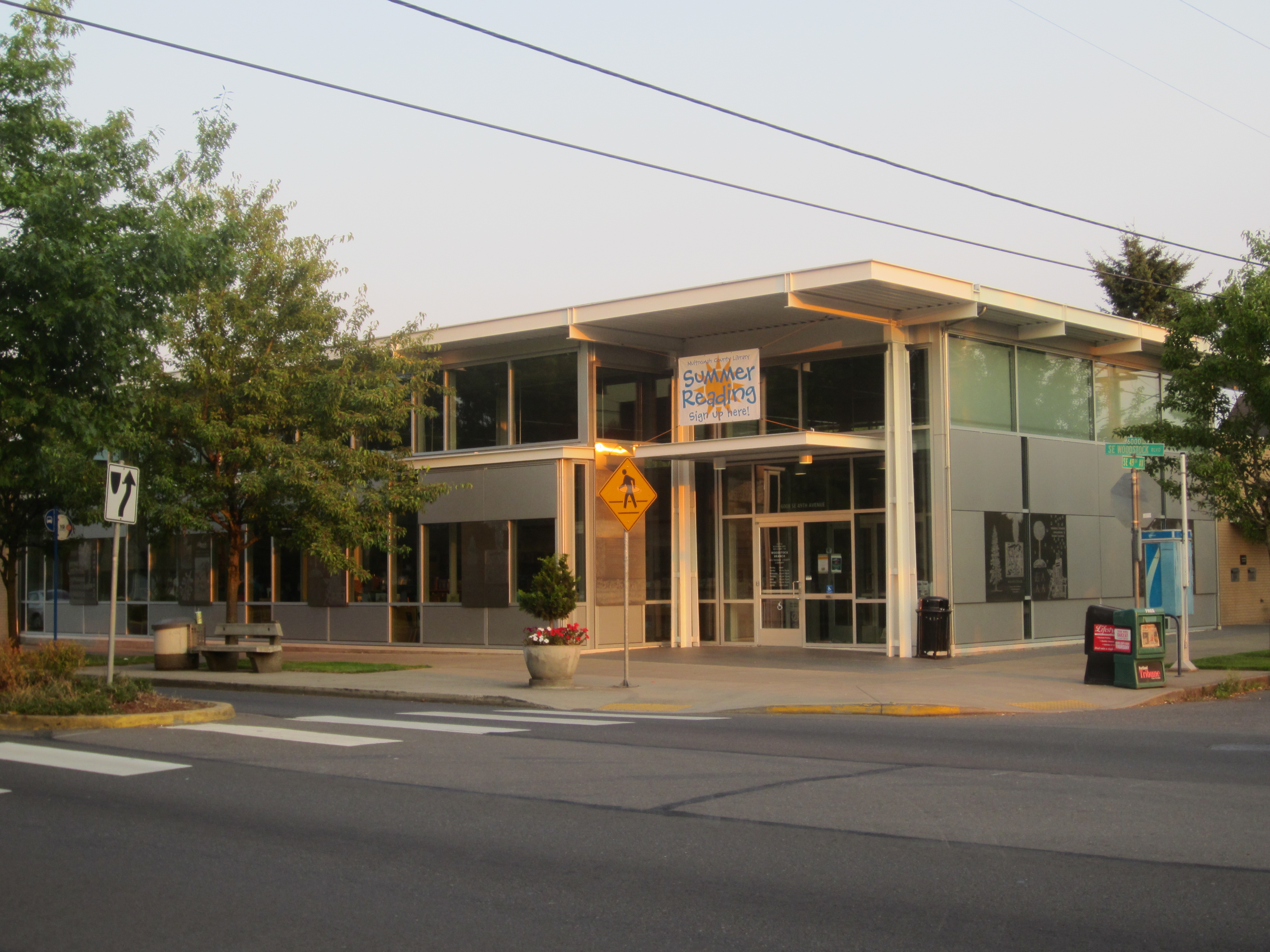
Woodstock Library

Woodstock, located in inner Southeast Portland, is bounded on the north by Southeast Holgate Boulevard, east by Southeast 45th and Southeast 60th Streets, south by Johnson Creek, and west by Cesar E. Chavez Boulevard (formerly Southeast 39th Avenue).

Business and civic activity is concentrated in Woodstock's Village Center located on Woodstock Boulevard between Cesar E. Chavez Boulevard (39th Avenue) and 52nd Avenue. Churches, the Woodstock Library, and the Woodstock Community Center are interspersed with commercial establishments offering a wide range of consumer goods and services. Single and multi-unit residential surround the Village Center with most multi-unit dwellings located near Woodstock Boulevard. Two schools — Woodstock Elementary and Lewis Elementary — are within walking distance of the Village Center. Reed College is down the hill to the west, two blocks away.

Notable businesses that have operated along Woodstock Boulevard include: Ate-Oh-Ate, Cloud City Ice Cream, Delta Cafe, Dick's Primal Burger, Grand Central Bakery, outposts of Double Mountain Brewery and Heart Coffee Roasters, Lutz Tavern, Nudi Noodle Place, Otto's Sausage Kitchen, Portland Fish Market, and Viking Soul Food. The food cart pod The Heist has hosted Bark City BBQ, Sammich, and Smaaken Waffle Sandwiches. Keeper Coffee and Toast are also in the neighborhood. Previously, Botanical Bakeshop, Bridge City Pizza, Country Bill's, and El Gallo Taqueria operated along Woodstock Boulevard.

== History ==
The Woodstock neighborhood is one of Portland's oldest, first platted in 1889. Many of its oldest houses, some constructed as early as the 1880s, are located in the northern part of the neighborhood. The northeast corner and southern panhandle contain mostly houses built following World War II. Urban infill is spread throughout the neighborhood but is concentrated in its eastern section.

The land now occupied by Woodstock was wilderness until the 1850s. In 1848, Clinton Kelly and his extended family arrived from Kentucky. Kelly, a Methodist minister, and his brothers migrated their families to the Oregon Territory, fleeing the Civil War and taking advantage of offers for free land. The Kelly family sought land suitable for farming. In December 1852, at the age of 21, Archon Kelly (Clinton and Mary's third son) received 320 acres (1.3 km^{2}) of wilderness on a plateau overlooking the underdeveloped area of land that now encompasses the Eastmoreland neighborhood and Reed College. Using current markers, Archon's land was bounded on the north by Southeast Raymond, on the east by Southeast 52nd Avenue, on the south by Duke Street, and on the west by Southeast 42nd Avenue. Archon lived on the farm until he sold it to Clinton for $2,500 in January 1863.

Ownership changed several more times and in 1889 the land was platted for residential development. A group of five men, including trustee James Havely, purchased 194.5 acres (0.787 km^{2}) of the land for $48,000. They named the subdivision Woodstock after Walter Scott's 1826 novel of the same name (naming residential subdivisions after romantic novels became "en vogue" as family names were used and became more scarce over time; Woodstock is one of several subdivisions in southeast Portland named after Scott's writings). In 1893, Havely built one of Woodstock's first houses, a Queen Anne style residence on Southeast 40th Avenue now designated as a historic landmark. Havely is also credited for arranging to supply the neighborhood with electricity and water.
