= Auto =

Auto may refer to:

== Vehicles ==
- An automobile, or car
- An autonomous car, a self-driving car
- An auto rickshaw

== Mechanisms ==
- Short for automatic
- An automaton
- An automatic transmission

== Media ==
- Auto (art), a form of Portuguese dramatic play
- Auto (film), a 2007 Indian comedy film
- Auto (play), a subgenre of dramatic literature
- Auto (Italian magazine), an Italian magazine and one of the organizers of the European Car of the Year award

=== Fictional characters ===
- Auto (Mega Man), a character from Mega Man series of games
- AUTO, a fictional robot who serves as the main antagonist in the 2008 film WALL-E

== Locations ==
- Auto, American Samoa
- Auto, West Virginia

== Programming keywords ==
- A keyword in the C programming language used to declare automatic variables
- A keyword in C++11 used for type inference

== Other uses ==
- Motorists for Themselves (Czech: Motoristé sobě, formally abbreviated AUTO), a political party in the Czech Republic

== See also ==
- Otto (disambiguation)
