= Nudi Noodle Place =

Asian restaurant in Portland, Oregon, U.S.

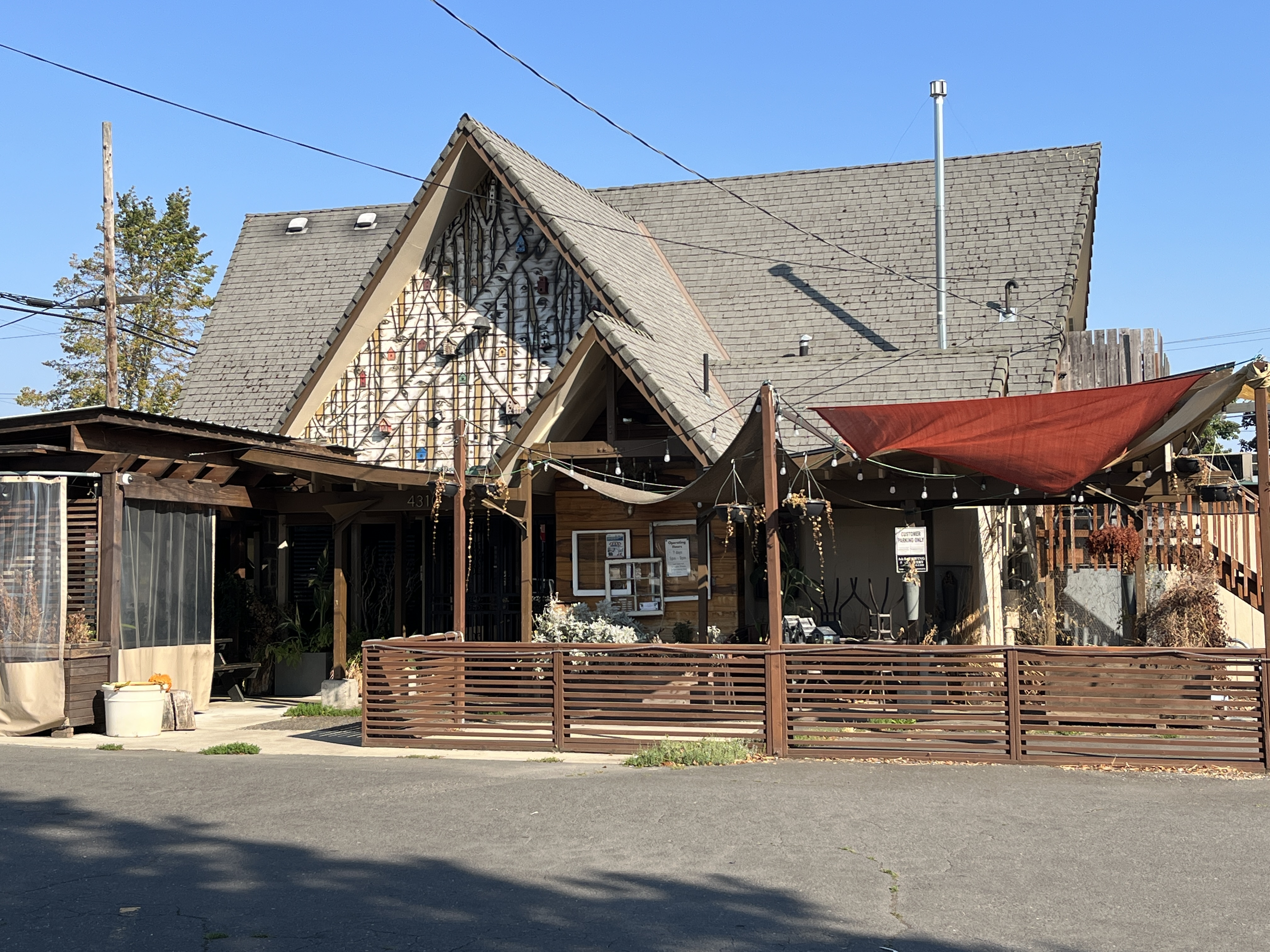
- The restaurant's exterior in 2022
- Interactive map of Nudi Noodle Place

Restaurant information
- Food type: Asian; Thai; Thai-fusion
- Location: 4310 Southeast Woodstock Boulevard, Portland, Multnomah, Oregon, 97206, United States
- Coordinates: 45.47905°N 122.6182°W
- Website: nudipdx.com

Nudi Noodle Place, or simply Nudi, is an Asian restaurant in Portland, Oregon.

== Description ==
Nudi Noodle Place is an Asian restaurant in southeast Portland's Woodstock neighborhood. Matthew Korfhage of Willamette Week wrote, "The tiny, friendly Thai-fusion restaurant—in both food and décor—is at once comforting and disorienting. Upon entering, diners are greeted by a nonfunctional glass door hanging on the wall, emblazoned with the words 'BEAUTIFUL PEOPLE THIS WAY PLEASE.'" The interior also features a chandelier covered in moss in the dining room, a bar "girded with tree bark and irregular panels of acid-washed metal", and 3-foot (0.91 m) tall artificial turf cutouts of gender symbols on the restroom doors. Korfhage described the aesthetic as "deadpan whimsy". Waz Wu of Eater Portland called Nudi "whimsical and forest-like".

Writing for The Oregonian, Ben Waterhouse described Nudi as a restaurant where "the strangeness of the woodsy decor is only outweighed by the concept of the menu: Noodles from all around the world – pad Thai, ramen, fettuccini and the like – in extravagant portions". He called the menu "mostly southeast Asian, with some Italian influences" and wrote, "Nudi looks like M.C. Escher's garden, with AstroTurf on the walls, a bark-covered bar, a mossy chandelier and carpentry tools hanging here and there in a disorienting hodgepodge, and dreary new-age music on the stereo."

=== Menu ===
The menu changes seasonally. The fall–winter menu has included the Angus gravy noodle, which has been described as "essentially a spiced sloppy Joe with ground beef and a wide rice-noodle base", as well as barbecue pork sticks, "Italian-style" kee mow, and coriander spinach-noodle duck. The carbonara belly is spaghetti and charred pork belly with bacon, pumpkin, spinach, cherry tomatoes, almonds, garlic, and Parmesan, served with a side of mint pesto. The khao tang is served as a canapé with coconut-pork-shrimp sauce on rice crackers. Duck wraps are also available as an appetizer. The laksa has pork, shrimp, and egg with peanut curry, and the semisweet coconut-milk flan has pumpkin and coconut sauce. Korfhage wrote:

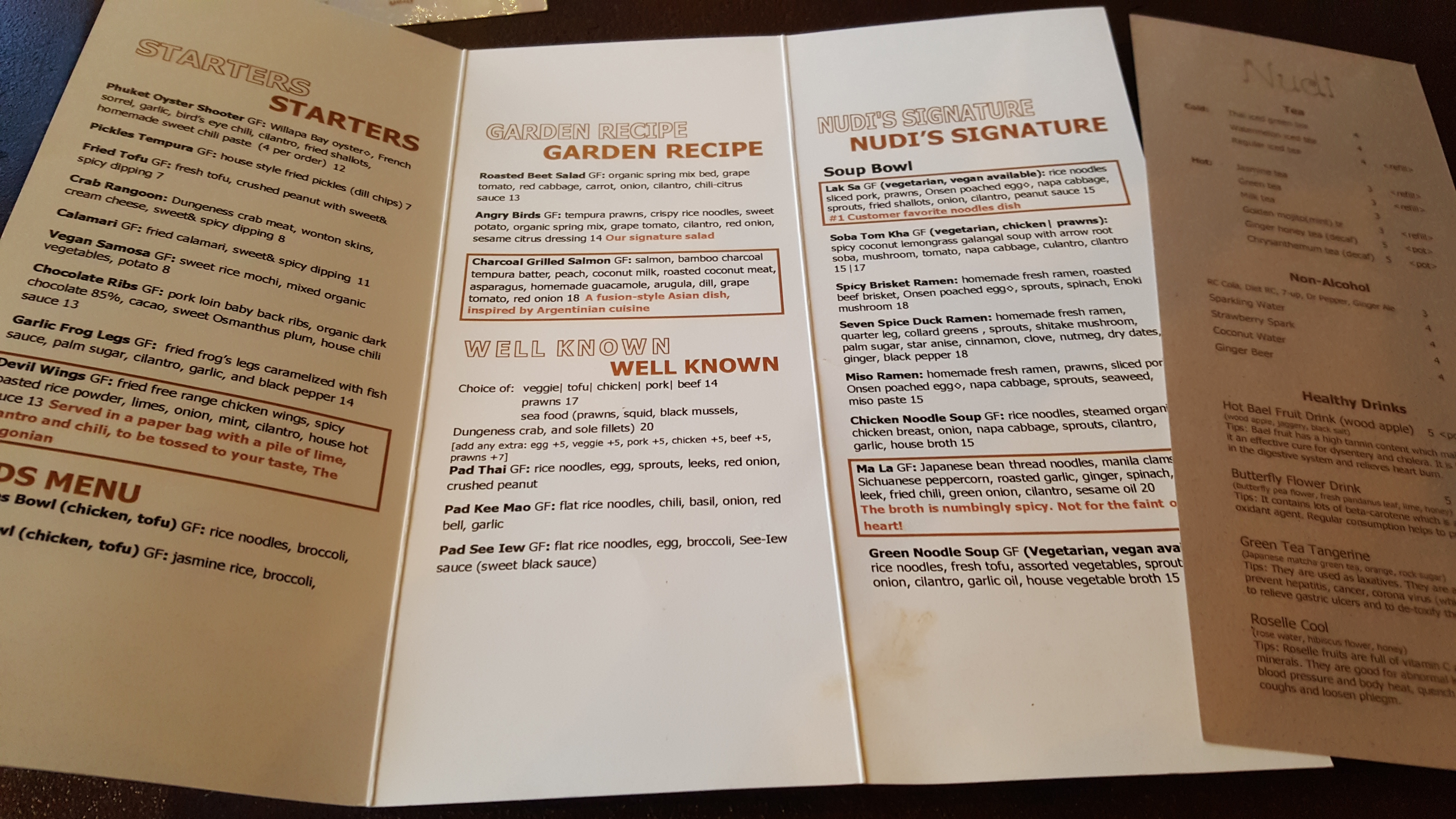
Menus

The restaurant's gift for idiosyncratic presentation extends to the food. The meaty filling for the spicy-sweet duck wrap appetizer arrives in a glass bowl, with a plastic syringe of plum sauce plunged deep within. The rice-and-coriander hot wings come awkwardly whole-limbed in a shakeable paper bag, while the wafer-thin, tempura-fried pickles are piled atop a perfect circle of hot sauce, centered on a perfectly square plate—a geometric puzzle as treatise in food design.

The Winter Kid Bowl has farfalle, chicken, and vegetables. Waterhouse described the Commander Noodle as "rice vermicelli, fish cakes, fried wontons and pork liver in a two-note (sweet and sour) broth", the Angus gravy noodles as "somewhere between beef chow fun and tagliatelle bolognese, with wide rice noodles in a rich ground-beef sauce, heavy on the white pepper", and the Devil Wings as "crisp-fried chicken wings served in a paper bag with a pile of lime, cilantro and chili to be tossed to your taste". Wu said the "Malaysian-style" laksa has a "rich and soothing curry coconut broth and rice noodles topped with a mountain of vegetables and hearty tofu chunks". He described the noodle soup as "vegetable-heavy" with a lighter broth. In 2022, Eater Portland's Nathan Williams wrote, "Nudi's eclectic menu includes everything from Thai boat noodles to spicy brisket ramen, with snacks like tempura-fried pickles and frog's legs. It's a neighborhood standby, using seasonal produce for its menu and offering a kid's menu for families." The drink menu includes teas and sodas.

== History ==
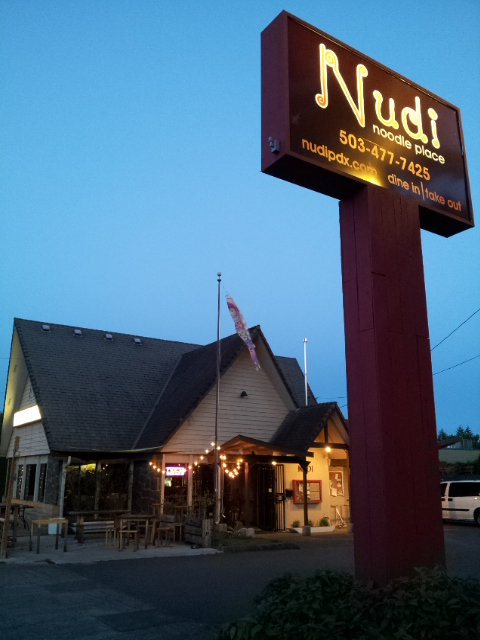
The restaurant's exterior and parking lot sign in 2013

Nudi operates in a building which previously housed Pace Setter Athletic, a running shoe store. In 2017, Food & Wine's Chelsea Morse mentioned Nudi's devil wings in an article about the trending use of paper bags for culinary purposes.

During the COVID-19 pandemic, the restaurant operated via take-out, delivery, and outdoor dining at times.

== Reception ==
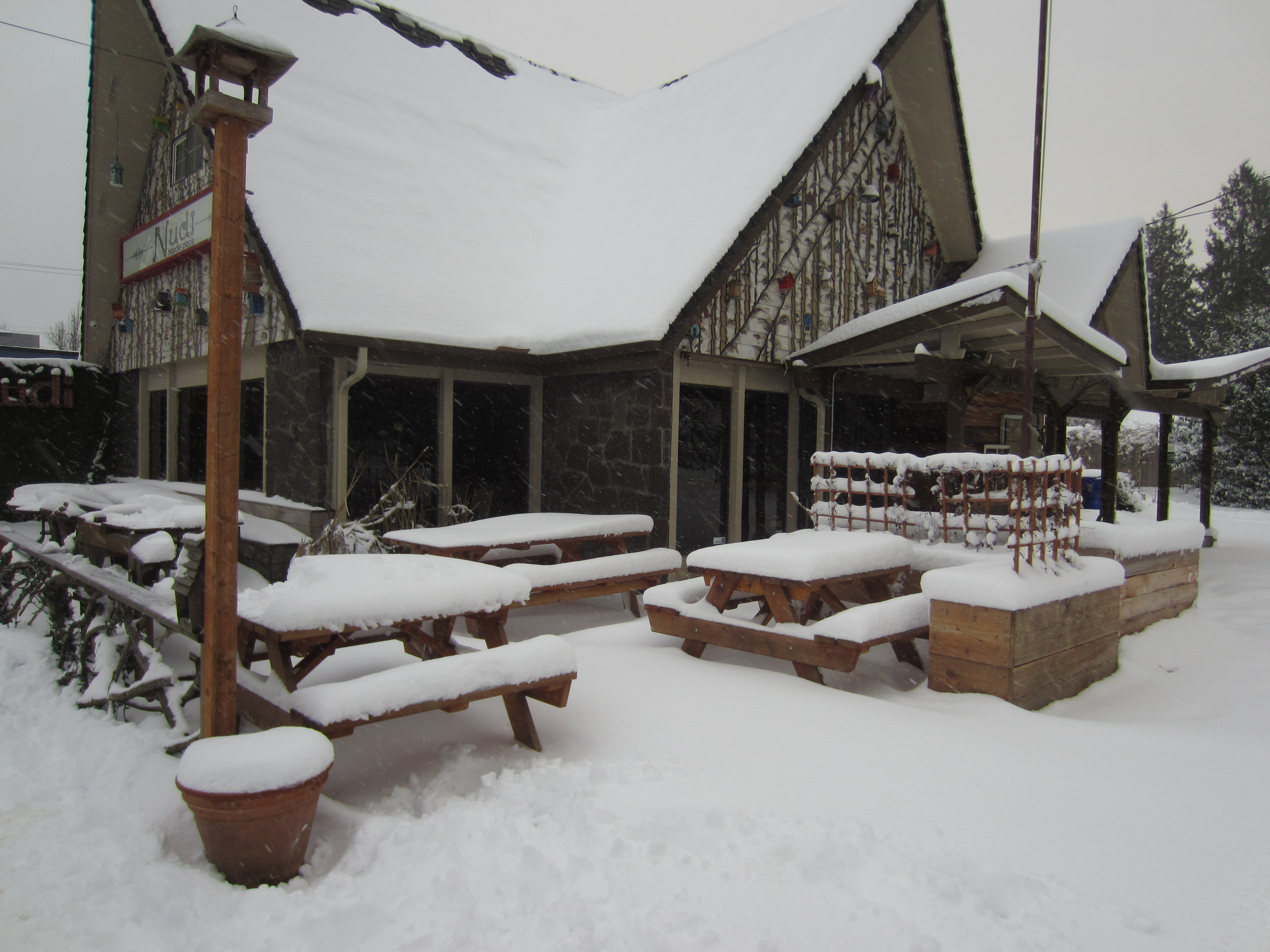
The restaurant's exterior during a winter storm in 2017

In 2013, Matthew Korfhage of Willamette Week wrote, "Asian fusion has become overfamiliar and falsely upscale, with exotic ingredients added as accents to continental ideas ... but Nudi is entirely the opposite proposition: Cooks with Thai sensibilities are at cheerful, casual play with our own local bounty, in ways wholly alien to Western palates. It is a restaurant one might expect to find in a midrange Bangkok hotel, not on Woodstock Boulevard." He also said, "Never mind that the pickles' hot sauce tastes almost exactly like TacoTime's, a crisp pickle burrito in art-deco format. It's brilliantly aestheticized trash, and guiltily delicious." Korfhage called the Angus gravy noodle "far from refined but deeply satisfying in a way that recalls childhood meals" and said the carbonara belly is "as confusing as it sounds, as if a sudden late-night inspiration in a pan". He described the khao tang as "approachable and light", the laksa as "oddly, much more familiar than the Westernized fare", and the flan as "entirely successful". He wrote, "Not everything at Nudi succeeds, but each meal is guaranteed to surprise."

Eater Portland's Erin DeJesus said in 2013, "Unlike fussier, more upscale takes on East-meets-West fusion cuisine, Nudi's version sees a more playful, in-your-face approach." Waz Wu included Nudi in the website's 2021 list of "Portland's Most Comforting Vegan Noodle Soups". Nathan Williams included the restaurant in Eater Portland's 2022 overview of "Where to Eat and Drink in Portland's Woodstock Neighborhood".
