= Woodstock Community Center =

Community center and former fire station in Portland, Oregon, U.S.

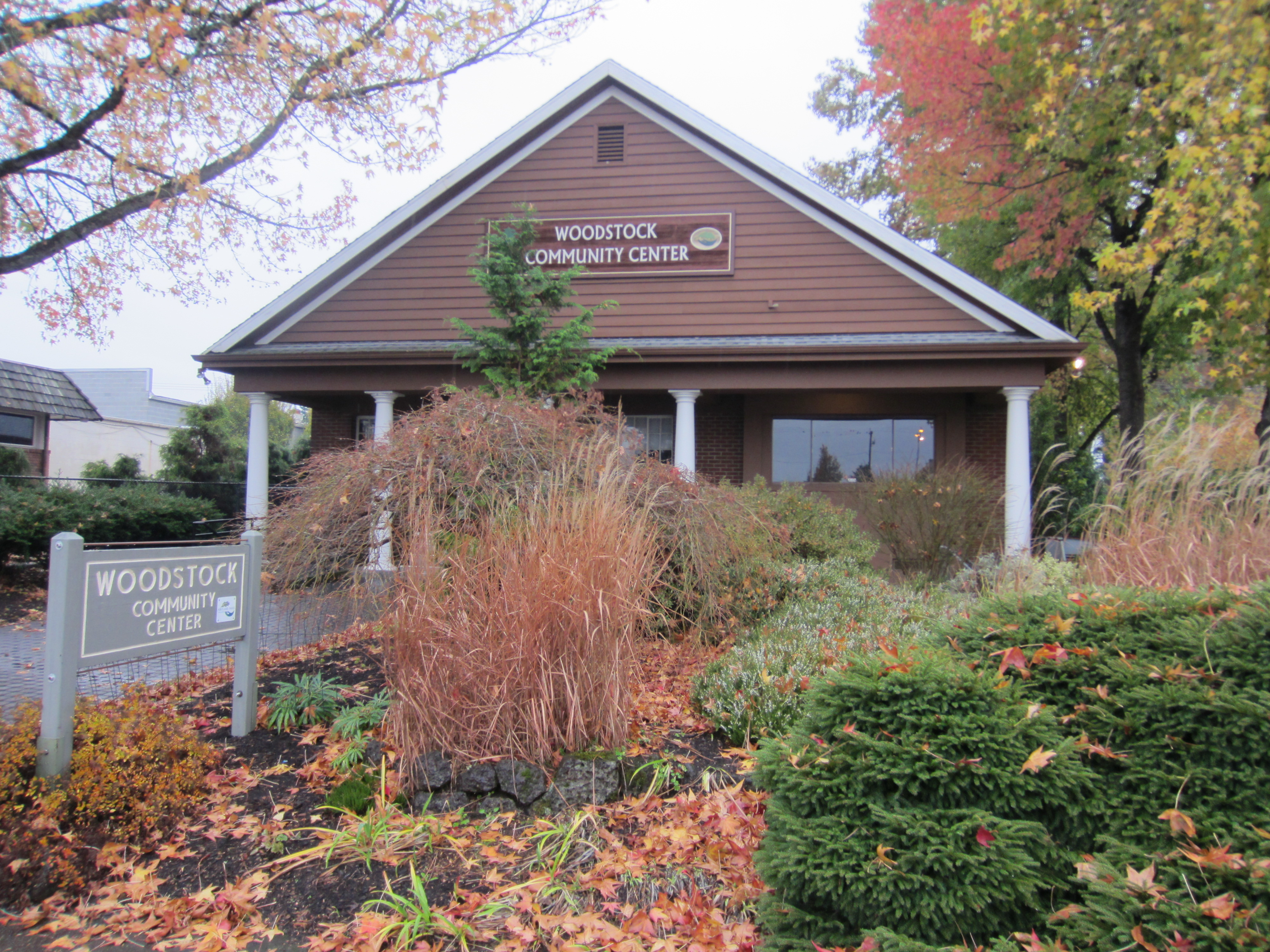
- The building's exterior in 2012

- Location within Portland, Oregon

General information
- Location: Woodstock, 5905 Southeast 43rd Avenue, Portland, Oregon, United States
- Coordinates: 45.4798°N 122.6188°W
- Owner: Portland Parks & Recreation

Website
- Woodstock Community Center

The Woodstock Community Center is a community center and former fire station built in 1928, located in the Woodstock neighborhood of Portland, Oregon, United States. The building was converted to a community center when Portland Parks & Recreation acquired ownership in 1958. In 2003, community members prevented closure due to budget constraints by forming a group called Friends of the Woodstock Community Center to raise funds and coordinate volunteers.

== History ==
Originally constructed as a fire station in 1928, the building was converted to a community center in 1958 after Portland Parks & Recreation (PP&R) acquired ownership. In 2003, City of Portland budget constraints threatened closure of the center. Community members formed a group called Friends of the Woodstock Community Center (FWCC) to raise funds and coordinate volunteers, preventing closure. Volunteers contribute thousands of hours each year to maintain the property and coordinate workshops and other community events. According to the Woodstock Neighborhood Association (WNA), an agreement with PP&R requires that the center operate on a cost neutral basis.

The center had 6,492 visits during the 2011–2012 fiscal year. In 2013, the center had a budget at nearly $33,000 of program revenue and two part-time staff members who also worked at the Mt. Scott Community Center (the Woodstock Community Center is considered its satellite). Volunteers continue to keep the center running, donating an average of 400 hours per quarter and maintaining the building's interior and exterior.

=== Community role ===
Over the years the building has hosted numerous activities. In the late-1950s the center began hosting all music education classes offered by PP&R. The music program included children's music, ear training, music theory and strings instruction; classes were offered at the Woodstock location until the construction of the Community Music Center in 1969. More recent examples include Al-Anon meetings, clock repair classes, guitar and piano lessons, Halloween parties, pilates, a pre-school cooperative program, Reed Neighborhood Association meetings, taekwondo, watercolor painting, WNA meetings, yoga classes and Zumba fitness classes. The center also hosts benefit events by FWCC and the WNA to support its maintenance fund through the sale of arts and crafts, plants, and raffle and silent auction items. Space at the center can be rented for events. As of 2015, PP&R operates a pre-school at the center.

== See also ==
- Firefighting in Oregon
