= Toast (restaurant) =

Restaurant in Portland, Oregon, U.S.

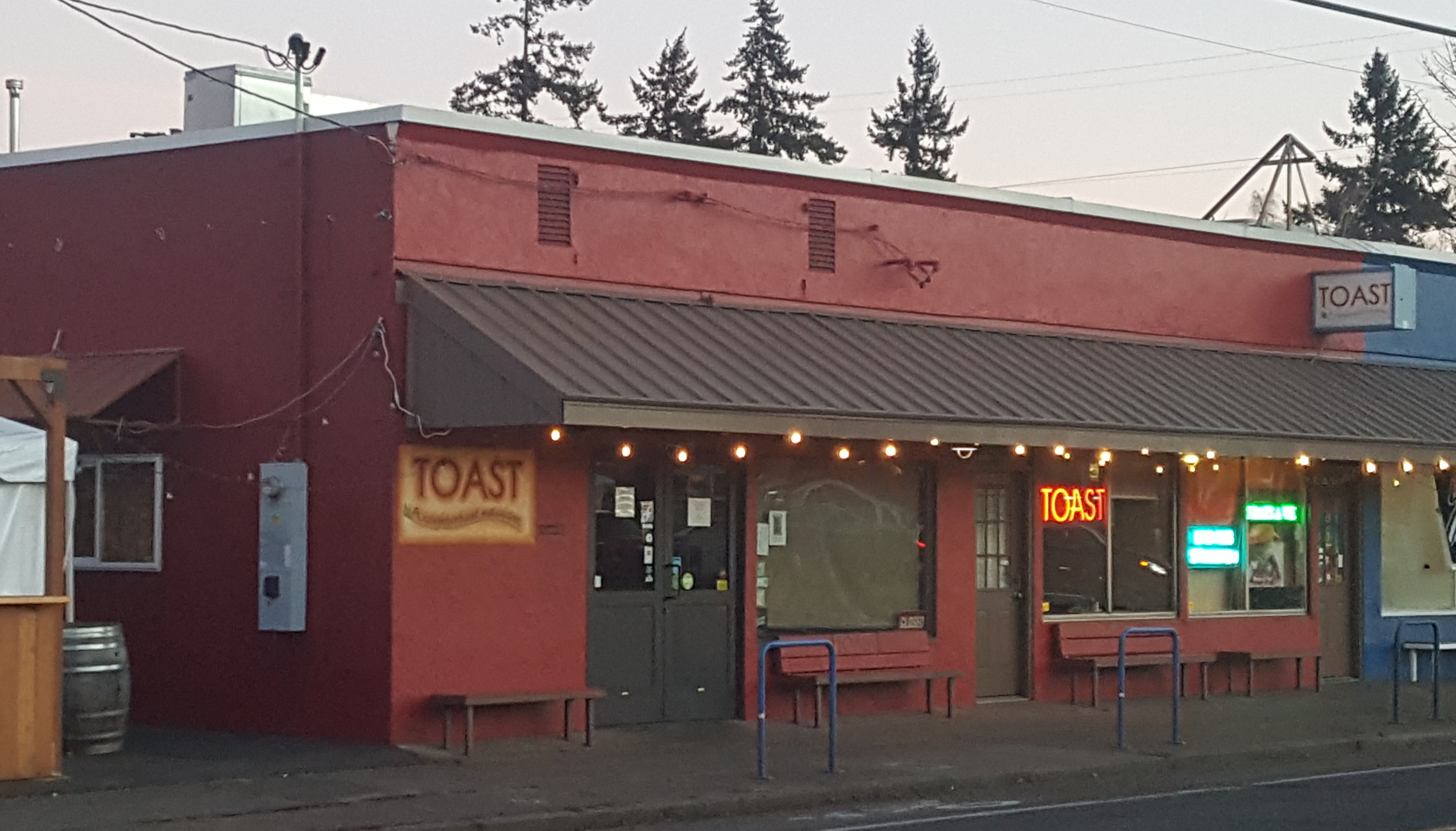
- The restaurant's exterior in 2022
- Interactive map of Toast

Restaurant information
- Established: August 18, 2007
- Owner: Donald Kotler
- Food type: American
- Location: 5222 Southeast 52nd Avenue, Portland, Multnomah, Oregon, 97206, United States
- Coordinates: 45.4849°N 122.6086°W
- Website: toastpdx.com

Toast is a restaurant in Portland, Oregon, United States. Owner Donald Kotler opened the cafe in 2007. Known for its breakfast and brunch menu, Toast also offers happy hour and dinner options.

== Description ==
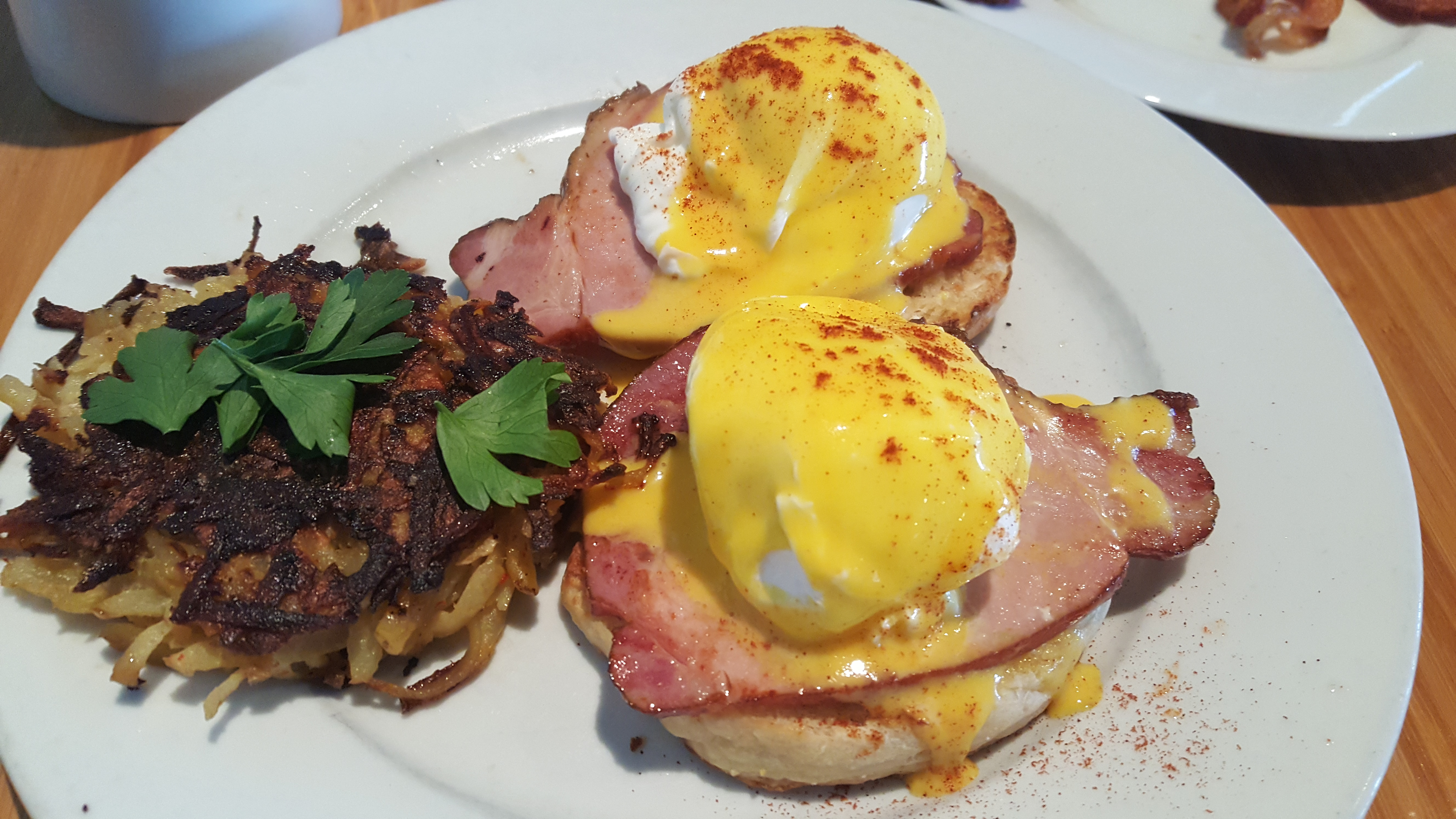
The Benny, 2022

Toast is a restaurant at the intersection of 52nd Avenue and Steele Street in southeast Portland's Woodstock neighborhood. Nathan Williams of Eater Portland described Toast as a "down-to-earth — but not uncreative — neighborhood café". Toast is known for breakfast and brunch, operating daily. The menu includes French toast with orange-vanilla whipped cream, and the Golden Pig, which has fried egg and pork belly. The afternoon happy hour menu includes macaroni and cheese made with Gruyère, a Cattail Creek lamb burger with roasted red peppers and caramelized onions, and a gin and tonic. Dinner options include gnocchi with roasted chicken, a lamb burger with Brussels sprouts and served with bulgur wheat salad, and sauteed manila clams with toast.

== History ==
Owner Donald Kotler opened Toast on August 18, 2007, in a space which previously housed an adult video store. He has also operated a food cart called Yolk since 2011, and his restaurant Bird and Bear has been described as a sibling restaurant to Toast. Kotler enjoys using berries as much as possible during berry season. He purchased berries from Patrick's Farm Fresh Berries in southwest Portland, as of 2008.

In 2010–2011, Toast was the target of break-ins, a vehicular hit-and-run, and vandalism. The business had 15 employees, as of 2010. Toast launched a dinner menu in 2014.

== Reception ==
In 2015, Ben Waterhouse of The Oregonian described Toast as a "beloved breakfast joint". Nathan William included Toast in Eater Portland's 2022 overview of recommended eateries in the Woodstock neighborhood. The website's Maya MacEvoy also included the restaurant in a 2022 overview of "Where to Find Wildly Tasty Game Burgers in Portland".
