= Heart Coffee Roasters =

Coffee chain in Portland, Oregon, U.S.

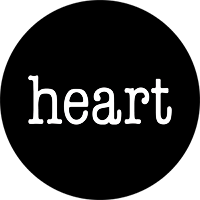

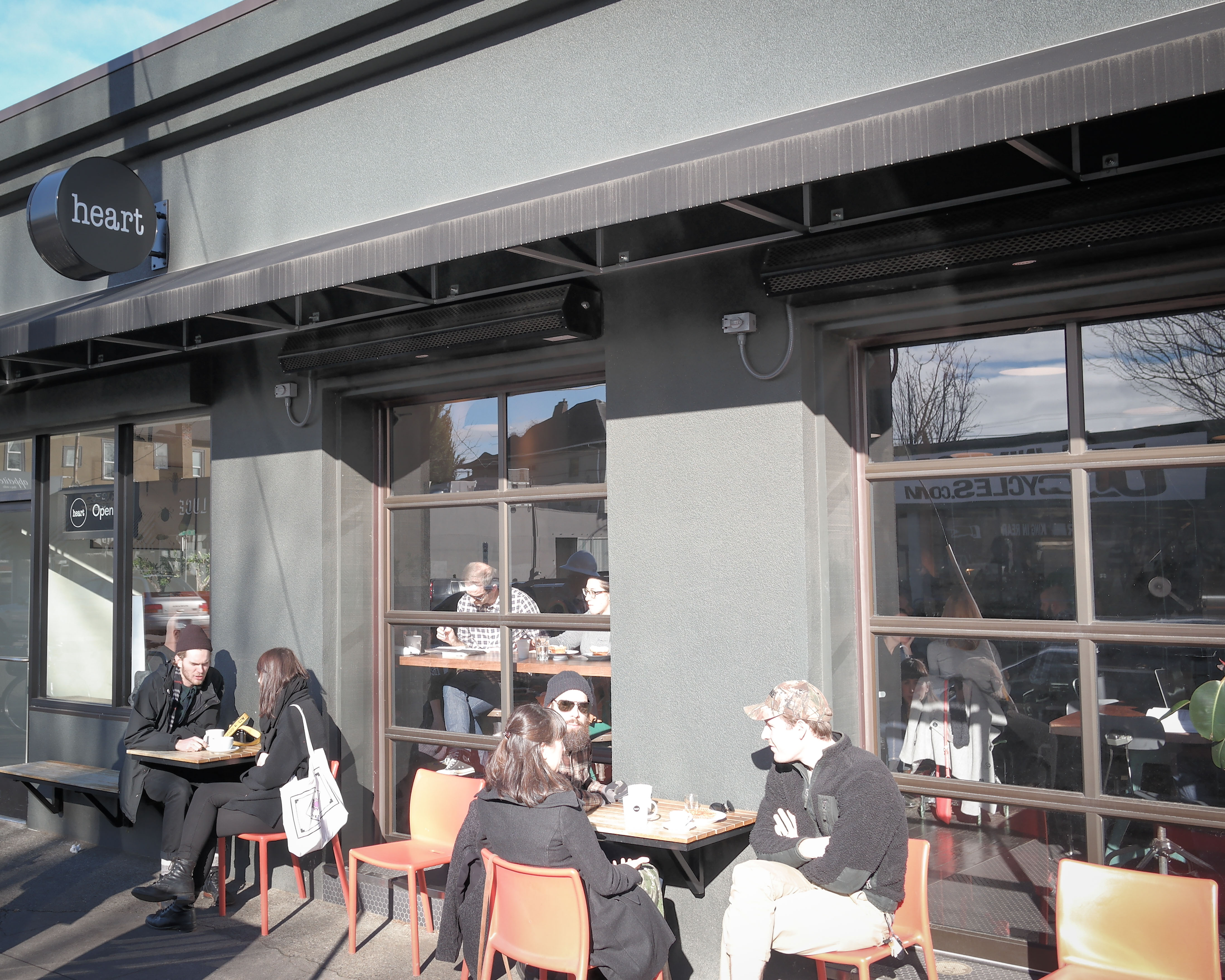
- Cafe exterior in 2014
- Founded: 2009; 17 years ago in Portland, Oregon, United States
- Founders: Wille and Rebekah Yli-Luoma
- Number of locations: 3 (2017)
- Area served: Portland, Oregon
- Website: heartroasters.com

Heart Coffee Roasters is a small specialty coffee roasting company with cafes in Portland, Oregon, United States. It was established in 2009 by Wille and Rebekah Yli-Luoma.

== Description and history ==
Wille and Rebekah Yli-Luoma opened Heart in 2009. Heart's original location, known as the Eastside Cafe, is located at 2211 East Burnside Street in Portland's Kerns neighborhood. Its second location, known as the Westside Cafe, opened in 2013 and is located at 537 Southwest 12th Avenue in downtown Portland's West End. Another location operates in southeast Portland's Woodstock neighborhood.

== Reception ==
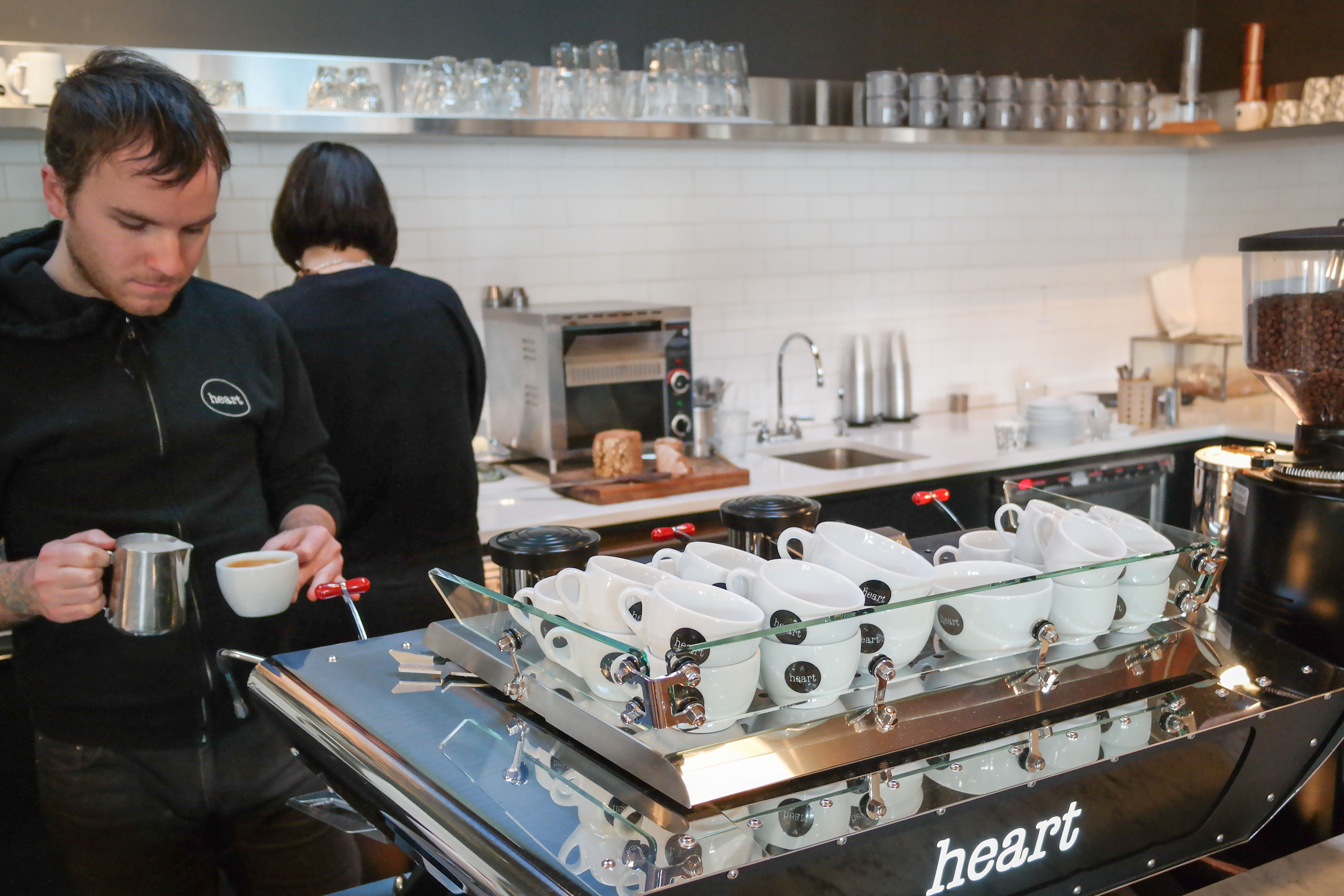
Heart barista preparing a cappuccino

Condé Nast Traveler called Heart's drinks "uncommonly clean and complex and said, "Chemex- and Aeropress-brewed 'pour-over' coffees are perhaps the best way to sample the results, though espresso drinks are excellent here, too."

In 2013, Dan Gentile of Thrillist included Heart in his list of "The Top 10 Coffee Roasters in the Nation, as Voted by Super-Serious Coffee Nerds". He also included Heart in his 2016 list of "The 21 Best Coffee Roasters in the Country", writing: "Portland isn't in short supply of sleekly designed coffee shops, but in addition to a design sense that would make a Scandinavian proud, Heart's coffee shop is literally built around a functioning black Probat roaster that fills the space with the smell of not-too-light, and definitely not-too-dark coffees."

In 2016, Eater.com's Emily McIntyre included Heart on her list of the "20 of the Best Coffee Shops in Portland". She wrote:

Few cafes have such a strong aesthetic and presentation as Heart on Burnside. Enter and think yourself lucky, because the rare espresso machine (currently Kees van der Westen), the expansive, simple menu, the beast of a vintage coffee roaster, and the 'do not touch signs' have the effect of creating an exclusive experience... While I recommend any seasonal drink here (and the summertime paleo affogato is delicious), my go-to at Heart is a cup of drip coffee.

== See also ==
- Coffee culture
- List of coffeehouse chains
