= Auto, West Virginia =

Unincorporated community in West Virginia, United States

- Unincorporated community
- Location within West Virginia Location within the United States
- Coordinates: 37°57′55″N 80°19′09″W
- Country: United States
- State: West Virginia
- County: Greenbrier
- Elevation: 2,372 ft (723 m)
- Time zone: UTC-5 (Eastern (EST))
  - Summer (DST): UTC-4 (EDT)
- Area codes: 304 & 681
- GNIS feature ID: 1550127

Auto is an unincorporated community in Greenbrier County, West Virginia, United States. Auto is 2.5 miles (4.0 km) southeast of Falling Spring.

A post office called Auto has been in operation since 1911. The community is said to have been named for horse and buggies (previously called "automobiles") in the area.
