= Otto. =

Finnish ATM network

- Operating area: Finland
- Members: N/A
- ATMs: ±1,700

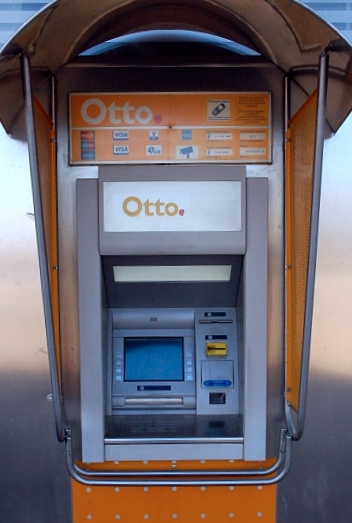

Otto. (spelled with the period) is Finland's interbank network, connecting the ATMs of nearly every bank in the country. It is owned and operated by Automatia. They offer service in Finnish and Swedish, but also in English to holders of international ATM cards. The word "otto" means "withdrawal" in Finnish, and is also a relatively common German-derived given name. The withdrawal points use machines from two different equipment manufacturers: NCR's Scottish subsidiary and German Wincor Nixdorf. The software and the new chip card readers have been supplied by Fujitsu Finland, and the information system is in charge of Tieto-Evry.

Some of the particularities of Otto. are that there are no bank-specific ATMs in Finland. Every ATM only bears the Otto. logo, plus the other interbank networks, which include Mastercard, Visa, American Express and their affiliated brands. Also, there are two separate slots. The blue one is for chip cards, whereas the yellow one is for non-chip cards that only have a magnetic stripe.

== History ==
Automatia Pankkiautomaatit started its operations in 1994, when it bought the cash machines of the biggest banks, namely SYP, KOP, Postipankki and Osuuspankki.

Automatia was jointly owned by four banking conglomerates. The background to the establishment was cutting the costs of automatic machines and the banking crisis in Finland. The goal was to prune the banks' automated network, which had grown too dense, and to centralize maintenance. Savings banks still had their own machines after this.

Since the beginning of 2005, the ATMs of the largest banks have been in the possession of Automatia Pankkiautomaatit Oy.

The number of withdrawal points has decreased. In 2006, there were about 1,700 of them.

Ottopiste had a monopoly position in the Finnish ATM market until the spring of 2008, when Nosto machines were installed in the R-kiosks still owned by Rautakirja. In 2012, they were joined by the Cash machine brand from Eurocash.

In 2009, Ottopiste started showing an advertisement for Saunalahti after the end of the transaction. In the 2010s, Ottopiste had the opportunity to make a donation to charity when withdrawing.

The number of withdrawal points decreased slightly during 2017 because the S group removed them from its premises due to the end of the cooperation. They were replaced by Nosto automats. Most of the removed Ottopoints were placed in new premises.

In February 2020, Danske Bank, Nordea and OP Ryhmä sold Automatia Pankkiautomaatit Oy to Swedish Loomis AB.
