= Otto's Sausage Kitchen =

Restaurant and meat market in Portland, Oregon, U.S.

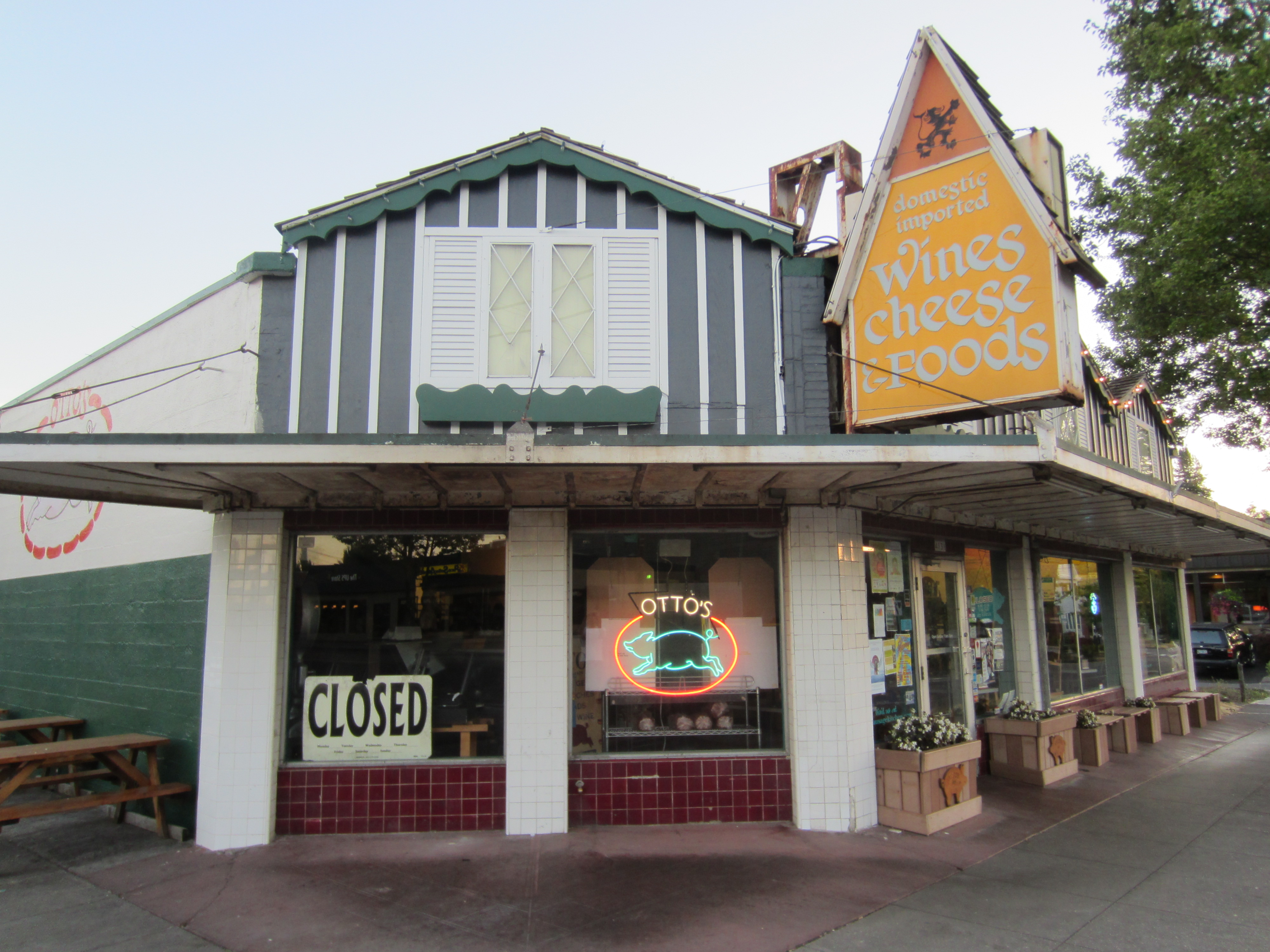
- The kitchen's front exterior in 2012
- Interactive map of Otto's Sausage Kitchen

Restaurant information
- Established: 1922
- Owners: Jerry and Gretchen Eichentopf
- Previous owners: Otto Eichentopf; Edwin Eichentopf
- Location: 4138 SE Woodstock Blvd., Portland, Multnomah, Oregon, 97202, United States
- Coordinates: 45°28′44″N 122°37′11″W
- Website: www.ottossausage.com

Otto's Sausage Kitchen, formerly Otto's Meat Market, is a sausage restaurant and meat market located in the Woodstock neighborhood of Portland, Oregon, United States. German immigrant Otto Eichentopf established Otto's Meat Market in Aberdeen, Washington in the 1910s before relocating to Portland in 1921. Otto's Meat Market opened on Southeast Woodstock Boulevard in 1922. A new building was constructed at its current location in 1936–1937. Eichentopf's son Edwin acquired the store in the 1940s; Edwin's son Jerry, who began working at Otto's full-time starting at age eighteen, acquired the stores in 1983. Since then, he and his wife have expanded the retail part of the store. The family, which now includes the couple's children and extended members, makes more than forty sausage varieties on site, including some based on Eichentopf's recipes from Germany.

== Description and history ==
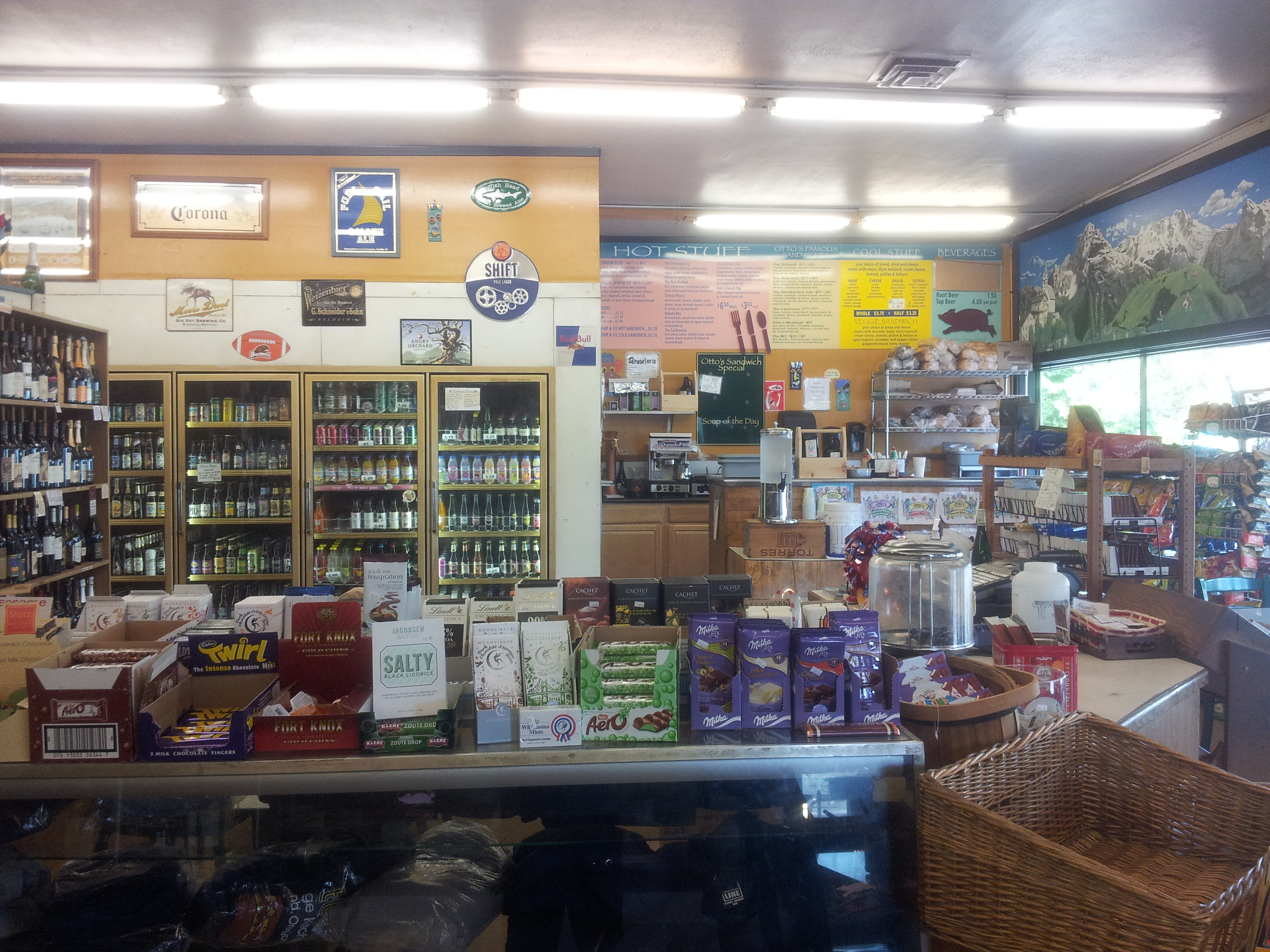
The interior of Otto's in 2014

Otto Eichentopf, born in Germany in 1890, started Otto's Meat Market in Aberdeen, Washington in the 1910s. In 1921, Eichentopf relocated to Portland, Oregon with his wife Selma and their son Edwin. Otto's Meat Market opened on Southeast Woodstock Boulevard in 1922. A new building was constructed at its current location in 1936–1937. The building included a smokehouse that spanned two stories. Moreland Market was located in the front of the building, and Eichentopf and his son continued to make sausage in the back. Following Edwin's marriage to Eleanor in 1942 and some time in Germany during World War II, he worked for his father and eventually acquired the meat market and store. In 1942, Edwin and Eleanor gave birth to Jerry.

Jerry began working for Edwin full-time starting at age eighteen. In 1976, Jerry married Gretchen, whom he met at Otto's. The couple acquired the store in 1983. Gretchen has expanded the retail part of Otto's over the years. The couple's three daughters Heidi, Christie and Bereka, and Heidi's husband Justin and their two children, assist with daily operations. Sausage making practices have been passed down over the generations. The family makes more than forty sausage varieties on site, including some based on Eichentopf's recipes from Germany.

Otto's' menu includes British bangers, bratwurst, chicken, ham hocks, frankfurters, and varieties of sausages (German, Swedish). The kitchen serves homemade relish and sauerkraut and also sells chocolates from Europe, German beer and wine, imported varieties of mustard, locally made honey, and peppered jellies.

=== Murals ===
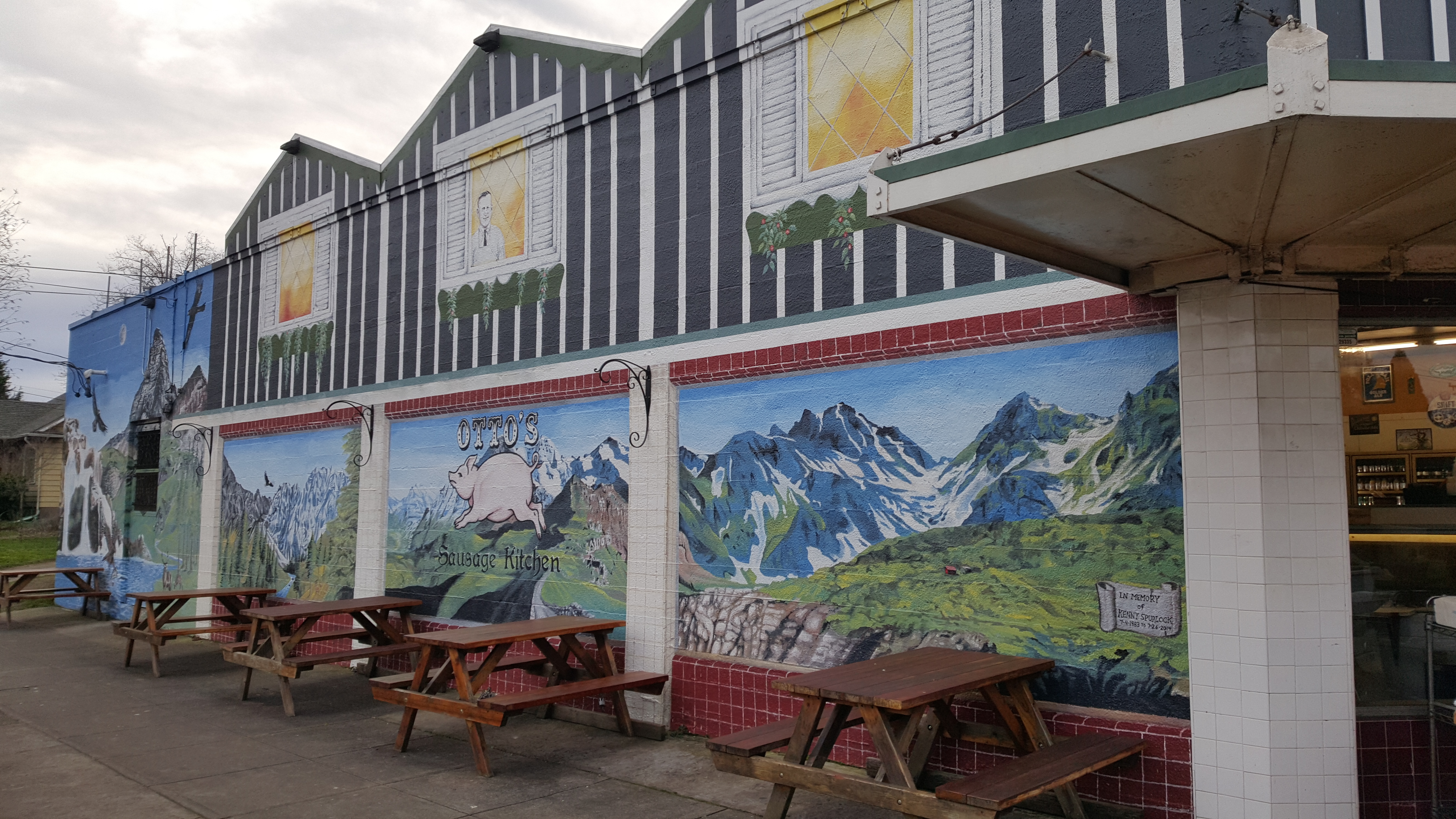
Exterior mural, 2016

In 2014, Michael Burge Smith painted a nearly 1,000 square foot (93 m^{2}) mural depicting the Swiss and German Alps for the Eichentopfs. Smith and Gretchen collaborated on the concept after he saw the building's blank exterior 64-foot (20 m) wall one year prior and showed her samples of his work. Before painting the kitchen's outside wall, Smith completed an interior mural at Otto's and another at the Eichentopfs' daughter's house.

Most of the mural, inspired by the Eichentophfs' passion for skiing, was completed by Smith; his business partner Kenny Spurlock assisted during the early stage, but died in August 2014. Smith worked on the mural over the course of two months, mostly between the hours of 9 pm and 3 am. He said of his working style: "I love the freedom of being able to pick my hours. And I travel with my band all over the world, so I fit painting in when I have time." Smith has completed many murals in Portland and has taught painting to high school students in Oregon and Idaho.

In February 2019, Smith returned to paint a "magical" 33-foot-long mural on the building's north side. The fantastic art depicts German folklore and features castles, fairies, and flying horses around a central "tree sprite". The "Lord of the Forest" figure is painted over a column and onto nearby benches, and the bark was painted by Smith to be interpreted as either "friendly or fearsome". According to staff, Smith typically paints seasonal murals four times per year.

== Reception ==
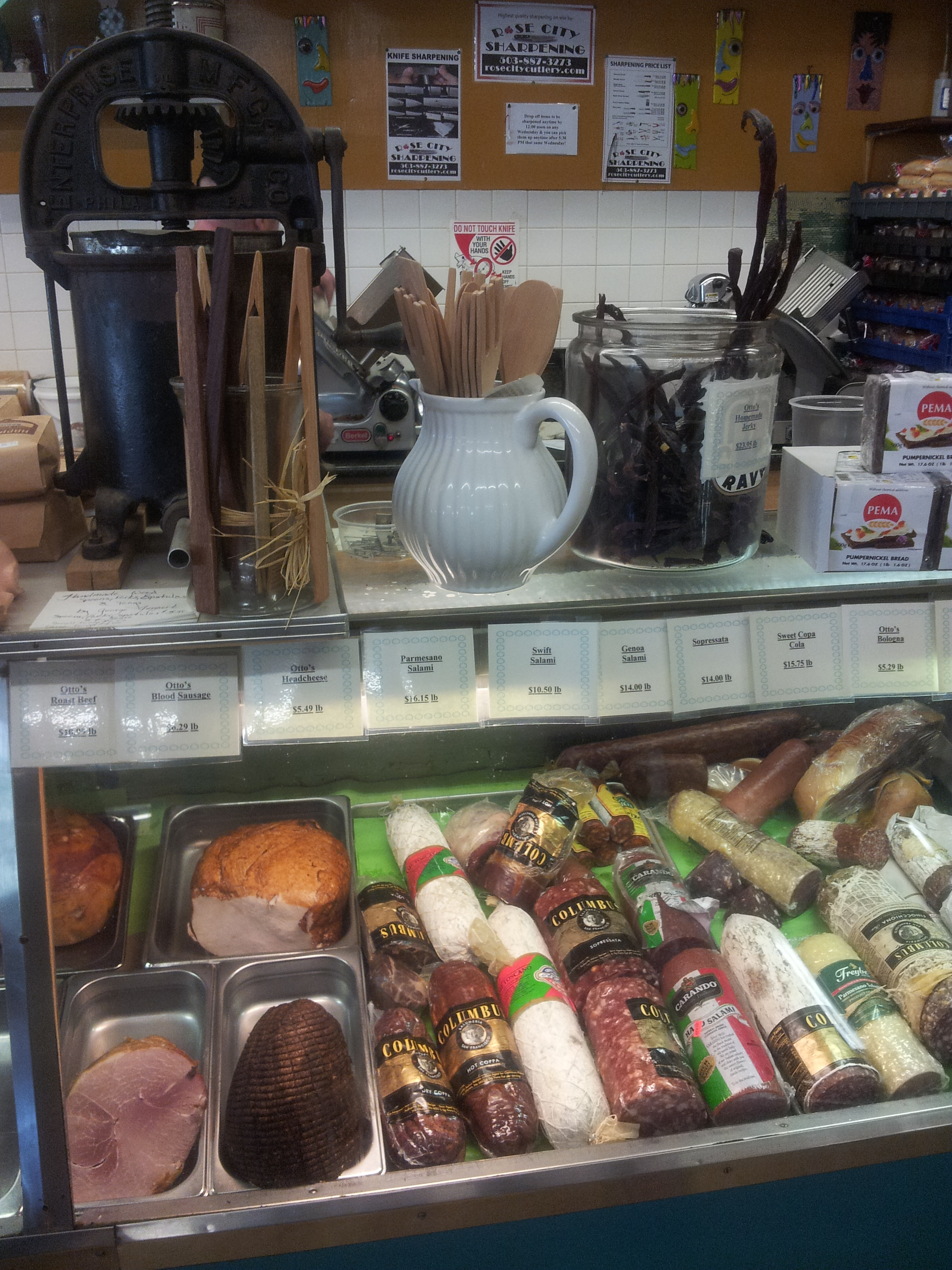
Products displayed in 2014

Otto's has been featured in Jane and Michael Stern's book Roadfood; on Food Network's Diners, Drive-Ins and Dives, and in publications such as Gourmet magazine and The Oregonian. The Sterns later included the kitchen on their list of the top ten "best hot-dog makers" in the United States for the cooking and food website Epicurious.

In 2011, Serious Eats included Otto's as one of 64 contenders in their "Search for America's Best Hog Dog"; the website commended the Portland restaurant for making their own sausages, unlike many others featured in the competition.

Otto's has been called "quaint" and its sausages, "awesome". The guide book Portland, Oregon: Including the Metro Area and Vancouver, Washington recommends the potato salad and says, "if you are a sausage connoisseur and love ethnic foods you will enjoy your stop here". Nathan Williams recommended Otto's in Eater Portland's 2022 overview of eateries in the Woodstock neighborhood. He also included the business in a 2023 list of the city's "snappiest, juiciest" hot dogs.

== See also ==
- List of companies based in Oregon
