= Mary Otto =

American medical journalist

Mary Otto is an American medical journalist who is the topic leader on oral health for the Association of Health Care Journalists. She is also the author of the book Teeth: The Story of Beauty, Inequality, and the Struggle for Oral Health in America, published in 2017 by the New Press. She previously worked at the Washington Post for eight years, where she reported on health care and poverty. She first began reporting on oral health in 2007 while working at the Post. She was a Knight Science Journalism Fellow from 2009 to 2010, and she received the Gies Award from the American Dental Education Association in 2010. In 2019, she received the Art of Healing Award from the Cambridge Health Alliance.
