= Double Mountain Brewery =

Brewery based in Hood River, Oregon, U.S.

Coordinates: 45.71003°N 121.51457°W

- Logo

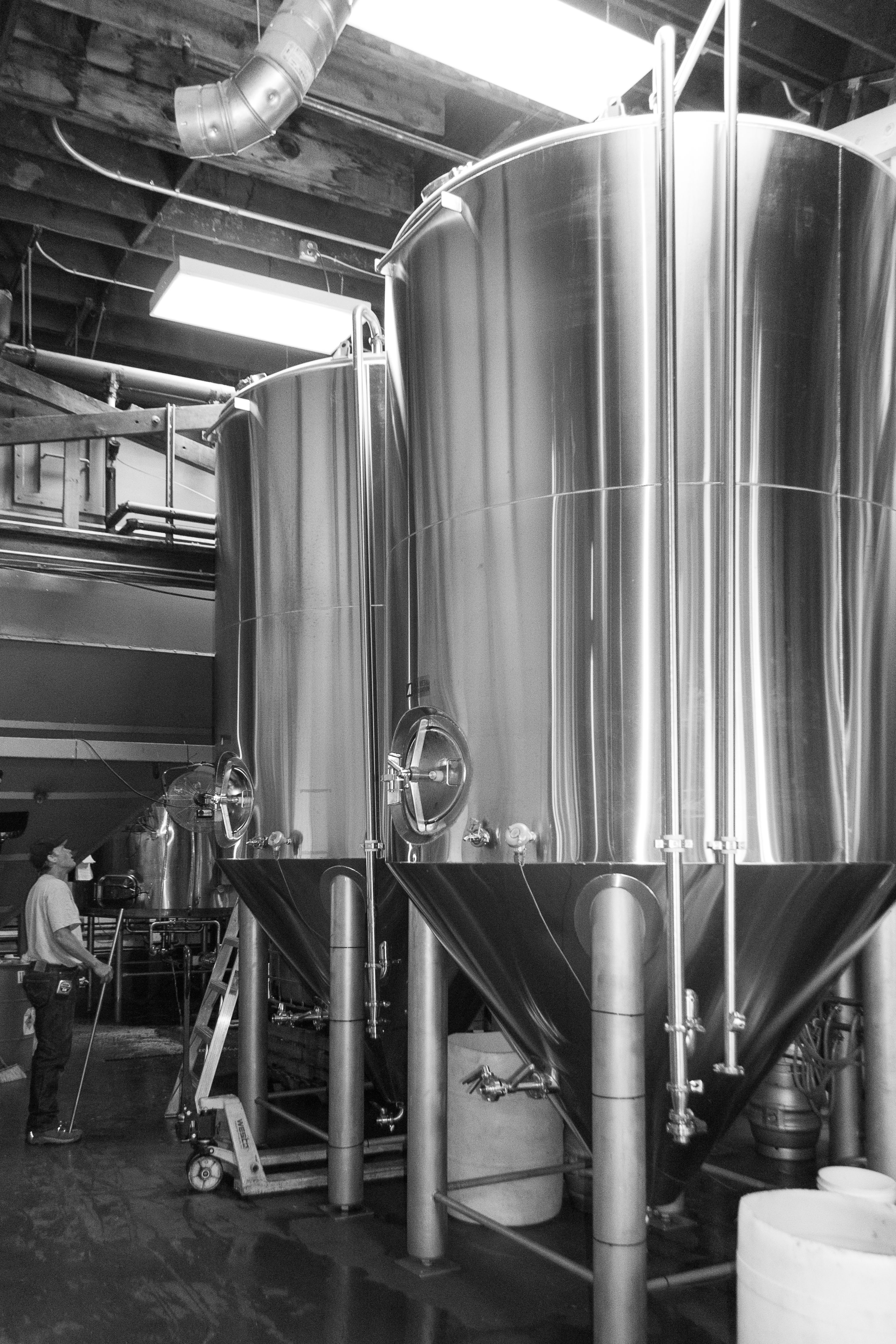
- The brewery in Hood River, Oregon, in 2013
- Industry: Brewing
- Founded: 2007; 19 years ago in Hood River, Oregon, United States
- Headquarters: 8 4th Street, Hood River, Oregon, United States
- Number of locations: 2 (2016)
- Areas served: Pacific Northwest; Los Angeles; New Jersey
- Website: doublemountainbrewery.com

Double Mountain Brewery & Taproom is a brewery and pub based in Hood River, Oregon, United States. The company was founded in 2007, and also operates in Portland. Double Mountain's beers are distributed in the Pacific Northwest, Greater Los Angeles, and New Jersey.

== Portland expansion ==
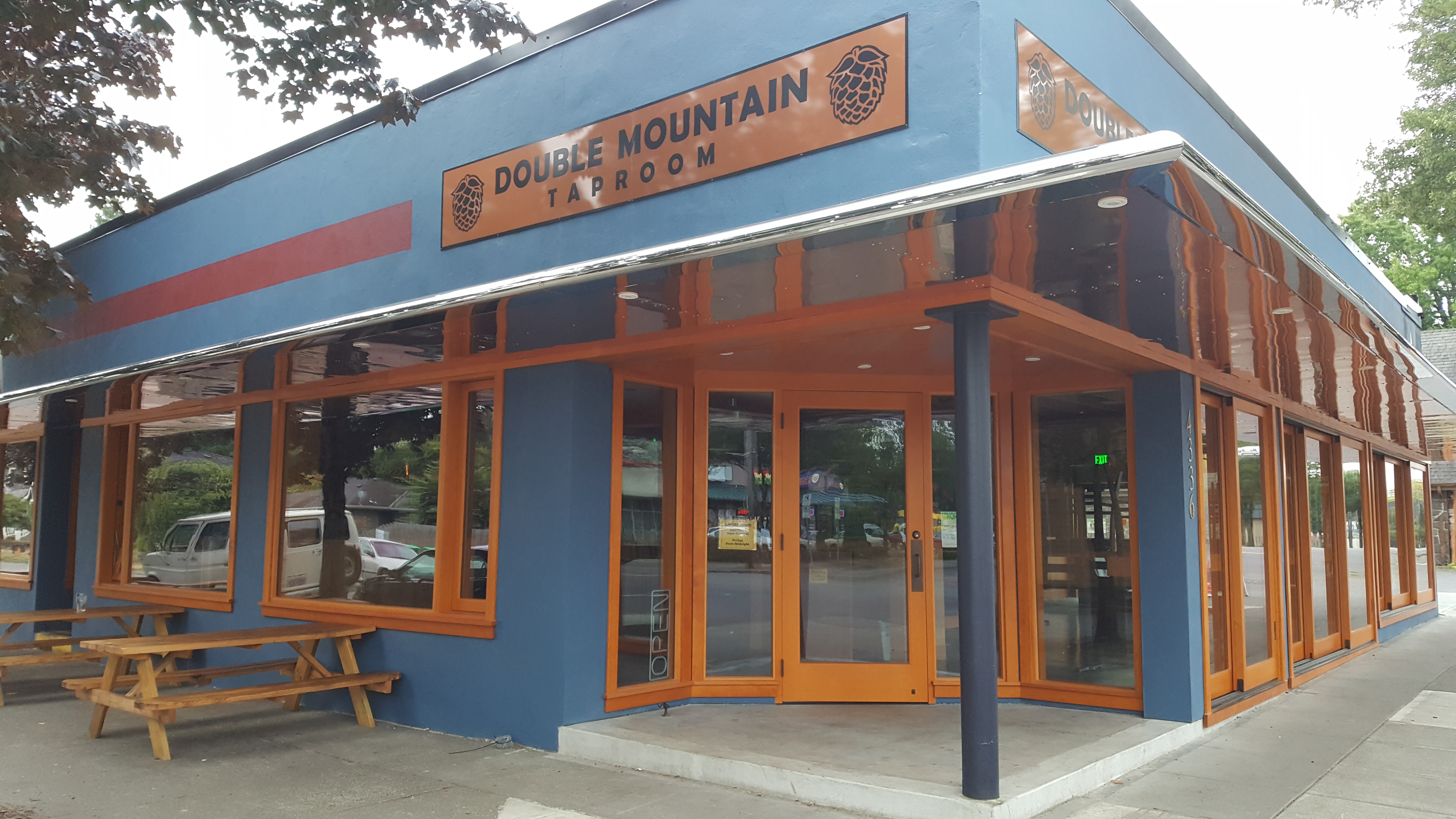
The Woodstock pub, 2016

In 2016, Double Mountain opened a second pub in the Woodstock neighborhood of southeast Portland, Oregon, marking the company's first expansion outside Hood River. Before opening, Double Mountain made exterior and interior improvements to the building, which included a kitchen remodel and dining area expansion. The satellite location does not have an on-site brewery. Unlike the Hood River pub, the Woodstock restaurant has a full liquor license.

In 2023, the business confirms plans to open a third location in north Portland's Overlook neighborhood.

== Reception ==
Willamette Week included the Hood River location in its 2015 "beer guide", "Hood River Beer Escape".

Double Mountain's "Double Mountain IRA" beer won the "best red, brown or amber beer" award in The Oregonian's 2015 People's Choice voting. The newspaper's staff also voted the IRA beer one of Oregon's top 10 craft beers.

== See also ==
- List of restaurants in Portland, Oregon
