= Otto of Montferrat =

Otto of Montferrat may refer to:

- Otto I, Marquis of Montferrat (r. 991)
- Otto II, Marquis of Montferrat (r. 1042–1084)
- Otto III, Marquis of Montferrat, known as Secondotto (r. 1372–1378)
- Otto of Tonengo, cardinal (1227–1250)
