= Otto Township =

Otto Township may refer to the following places :

In Canada

- Otto Township, Timiskaming District, Ontario

In the United States

- Otto Township, Kankakee County, Illinois
- Otto Township, Michigan
- Otto Township, Otter Tail County, Minnesota
- Otto Township, Pennsylvania
