= Venantia Otto =

Namibian fashion model (born 1987)

- Born: August 22, 1987 (age 38); Windhoek, Namibia
- Occupation: Model

Venantia Otto (born 1987) is a Namibian fashion model who won the 2006 Face of Africa competition.

== Career ==
Otto was born on October 22, 1987, in Windhoek, the capital city of Namibia. In 2006 Otto was voted for and won the South African Sun City competition and later the Face of Africa competition, one of the most important beauty contests of the African continent. She was able to prevail against 6000 other candidates from twelve countries. Besides the Face of Africa title, she also won a cash prize of 10,000 US dollars. This opened up other opportunities for her in the modeling industry. She was offered a 150,000 US dollars three-year modeling contract with the agency Elite Model in New York in the United States of America. Besides modelling, Venantia Otto has also featured on screen sets. She took a lead role in the movie "Nama" by Christoph Ebner, which was presented publicly in Windhoek in April 2008. In May 2008, the film was shown at the International Film Festival in Cannes, France.

In 2013, Otto starred in the movie Honeymoon Hotel alongside a cast that was drawn from different African countries including Ghana and Nigeria.

She has indicated an interest to host a television talk show of her own one day.
