= Oto (name) =

Oto is a given name and surname. As a given name it is related to the name Otto. Notable people with the name include:

== Given name ==
- Oto Bihalji-Merin (1904–1993), Serbian writer
- Oto Brunegraf (born 1972), Slovak football manager
- Oto Horvat (born 1967), Serbian poet
- Oto Iskandar di Nata (1897–1945), Indonesian freedom fighter
- Oto Kanno (born 2000), Japanese professional footballer
- Oto Luthar (born 1959), Slovenian historian
- Oto Pestner (born 1956), Slovenian singer and composer
- Oto Pustoslemšek (born 1943), Slovenian alpine skier
- Oto Seviško (1892–1958), Latvian sprinter

== Surname ==
- Michiei Oto, Japanese molecular biologist
- Nataniela Oto (born 1980), Tongan-Japanese rugby union player
- Razlan Oto (born 1984), Malaysian footballer

== Fictional characters ==
- Oto Sakura, supporting character in the anime series You and Idol Pretty Cure

+
