= Rivalries in the KHL =

Rivalries in the KHL come in many categories. There's many rivalries that have carried over from the days of the Russian Superleague, while others are new and may disappear. Some are based on geography, while others are based on team names or organization that these teams belonged to back in the Soviet Union. Not all teams have pronounced rivalries that don't change with each season - this article attempts to chronicle only those that last for multiple years.

In the European tradition, rivalries in Russia are referred to as "Derbies".

== Geographic rivalries ==
=== Capital City Derbies ===
- HC CSKA Moscow vs. HC Spartak Moscow
- HC Spartak Moscow vs. HC Dynamo Moscow
- HC Dynamo Moscow vs. HC CSKA Moscow

Every year, sports news outlets even calculate who the Moscow Champion is, based on games just between these three teams. As of the second season of the KHL (2009–10), all the Moscow teams are in one Conference, making rivalry matches more common. Due to hockey being less popular than association football and other sports in Moscow, teams based there usually suffer in attendance. Capital city derbies, however, are always attended far better than other games.

=== Moscow Oblast Derbies ===
- Atlant Moscow Oblast vs. Vityaz Chekhov (Defunct)
- Atlant Moscow Oblast vs. HC MVD (Defunct)
- Khimik Voskresensk vs. HC MVD (Defunct)
- Vityaz Chekhov vs. HC MVD (Defunct)
- Vityaz Chekhov vs. Khimik Voskresensk (Defunct)

=== Two Capitals Derbies ===
A continuation of the general rivalry between Saint Petersburg and Moscow, this rivalry encompasses SKA against any of the Moscow teams, although not the teams in the Moscow Oblast. The most tense rivalry is between SKA and CSKA, which called The Army Derby.

- SKA Saint Petersburg vs. HC Spartak Moscow
- SKA Saint Petersburg vs. HC Dynamo Moscow
- SKA Saint Petersburg vs. HC CSKA Moscow

=== Tatarstan Derby ===
- Ak Bars Kazan vs. Neftekhimik Nizhnekamsk

Not as seriously regarded by Ak Bars as by Neftekhimik, this rivalry nonetheless is significant in that Ak Bars has been known to poach players and coaches (Vladimir Krikunov was poached just before the 2011–12 KHL season following Zinetula Bilyaletdinov's hiring by the Russia men's national ice hockey team). Ak Bars Kazan is regarded as the 'older brother' of Tatarstan hockey, and the rivalry reflect a sibling mentality.

=== Ural Derbies ===
- Traktor Chelyabinsk vs. Metallurg Magnitogorsk
- Traktor Chelyabinsk vs. Avtomobilist Yekaterinburg
- Avtomobilist Yekaterinburg vs. Metallurg Magnitogorsk

=== Siberian Derbies ===
- Sibir Novosibirsk vs. Avangard Omsk
- Sibir Novosibirsk vs. Metallurg Novokuznetsk (Defunct)
- Avangard Omsk vs. Metallurg Novokuznetsk (Defunct)

=== Tatarstan and Bashkortostan rivalry ===
- Ak Bars vs. Salavat Yulayev

=== Volga Derbies ===
- Lokomotiv Yaroslavl vs. Torpedo Nizhny Novgorod
- Torpedo Nizhny Novgorod vs. Ak Bars Kazan
- HC Lada Togliatti vs. Lokomotiv Yaroslavl
- HC Lada Togliatti vs. Ak Bars Kazan
- HC Lada Togliatti vs. Torpedo Nizhny Novgorod
- Ak Bars Kazan vs. Lokomotiv Yaroslavl

=== Czechoslovak Derby ===
- HC Lev Praha vs. Slovan Bratislava (Defunct)

The rivalry was natural from the very beginning due to the Czech Republic–Slovakia ice hockey rivalry and the two teams being the only representatives of their countries in the league. It got even intensified when in their first game HC Lev's Zdeno Chára body-checked Slovan's team captain Miroslav Šatan after which Šatan had been out of play until the end of the season. The fairness of this hit was the center of many discussions.

=== Far Eastern Derby ===
- Amur Khabarovsk vs. Admiral Vladivostok

== Organizational rivalries ==
=== Army Derby ===
- HC CSKA Moscow vs. SKA Saint Petersburg

Both teams in Soviet times belonged to the Army organization - (C)SKA stands for (Central'niy) Sportivniy Klub Armii, (Central) Sports Club of the Army.

=== Dinamo Derbies ===
Not as prominent as the Army rivalry, sometimes games between the Dynamo Sports Club teams are referred to as a rivalry. Fans also sometimes treat the inter-Dynamo games with special attention. However unlike the other two, the new incarnation of Dinamo Riga does not directly come from the organization but rather only took the identity of the meanwhile abolished Soviet era incarnation of Dinamo Riga.

- Dinamo Riga vs. HC Dinamo Minsk
- HC Dinamo Minsk vs. HC Dynamo Moscow
- HC Dynamo Moscow vs. Dinamo Riga

Dynamo Moscow and Dinamo Riga have met in three consecutive years of the KHL playoffs (if the series against HC MVD is included), with Moscow winning two series so far, and Riga only one.

=== Khimik Derby (Defunct, also known as Yellow-Blue derby) ===
- Khimik Voskresensk vs. Atlant Moscow Oblast (Defunct)

Before relocating to Mytishchi, Atlant used to be known as Khimik and play in Voskresensk. After relocation, Voskresensk fielded a new team called Khimik in the Russian minor leagues. In the first season of the KHL, Khimik Voskresensk was invited to join the Russian Major League after it won the league and original invitee Avtomobilist Yekaterinburg could not fulfill its financial obligations. Not active since Khimik dropped out of the league after the first season due to financial issues (although it theoretically still holds KHL membership and could rejoin if finances allow). Most fans consider Khimik Voskresensk the true heir of Voskresensk hockey, and this rivalry was regarded as both a Moscow Oblast Derby, and an Organizational Derby.

== Divisional rivalries ==
Permanent divisions were first introduced to the KHL organizational structure in the second season, 2009-2010 (in the first season, the divisions were based on performance rather than geography, and were designed to be fluid. Starting in the second season, divisions became geographic in order to cut travel costs). As yet, notable rivalries due only to divisions have not really developed, although sports reporters always pay higher attention to games between the top two teams.

- Severstal Cherepovets vs. Lokomotiv Yaroslavl
- Amur Khabarovsk vs. Avangard Omsk
- Amur Khabarovsk vs. Sibir Novosibirsk
- Amur Khabarovsk vs. Metallurg Novokuznetsk (Defunct)
- Dinamo Riga vs. SKA Saint Petersburg

== Play-off rivalries ==
- Avangard Omsk vs. Metallurg Magnitogorsk

Two of the best teams from the Russian Superleague era, these two teams are still considered "Grands" and their matches are highlighted by the news when they occur.

- Salavat Yulaev Ufa vs. Ak Bars Kazan
- Severstal Cherepovets vs. Atlant Moscow Oblast (Defunct)
- SKA Saint Petersburg vs. Atlant Moscow Oblast (Defunct)
- Ak Bars Kazan vs. Traktor Chelyabinsk
- Ak Bars Kazan vs. Metallurg Magnitogorsk
- Salavat Yulaev Ufa vs. Metallurg Magnitogorsk
- Lokomotiv Yaroslavl vs. Atlant Moscow Oblast (Defunct)

=== Big Green Derby ===
- Ak Bars Kazan vs. Salavat Yulaev Ufa

Also can be referred to as the Derby of Champions, these are the first two teams to have won the Gagarin Cup. Both teams have green uniforms, are from autonomous republics, and have NHL-caliber players, making the games always a much watched and commented on affair.

=== Cat Derby ===
- Barys Nur-Sultan vs. Ak Bars Kazan

The name of the rivalry comes from the names of the team - both refer to snow leopards. Ak Bars has played Barys in the first playoff round of the first three KHL seasons, and defeated them every year without losing a game.

=== Turkic derbies ===
- Salavat Yulayev vs. Barys vs. Ak Bars

== Other rivalries ==
- SKA Saint Petersburg vs. Severstal Cherepovets
- Vityaz Chekhov vs. HC Dinamo Minsk
- Vityaz Chekhov vs. Avangard Omsk
