= Unnur =

Unnur is a given name. Notable people with the name include:

- Unnur Benediktsdottir Bjarklind (1881–1946), Icelandic poet and prose writer who wrote as Hulda
- Unnur Birna Vilhjálmsdóttir (born 1984), former winner of the Miss Iceland pageant
- Unnur Brá Konráðsdóttir (born 1974), Icelandic politician
- Unnur Steinsson, Miss Iceland 1983

== See also ==
- Auður (disambiguation), an Icelandic name of which Unnur was originally a variant form
- Unni - Norwegian equivalent as a given name
- Hunnur
- Unni (disambiguation)
