= Otto =

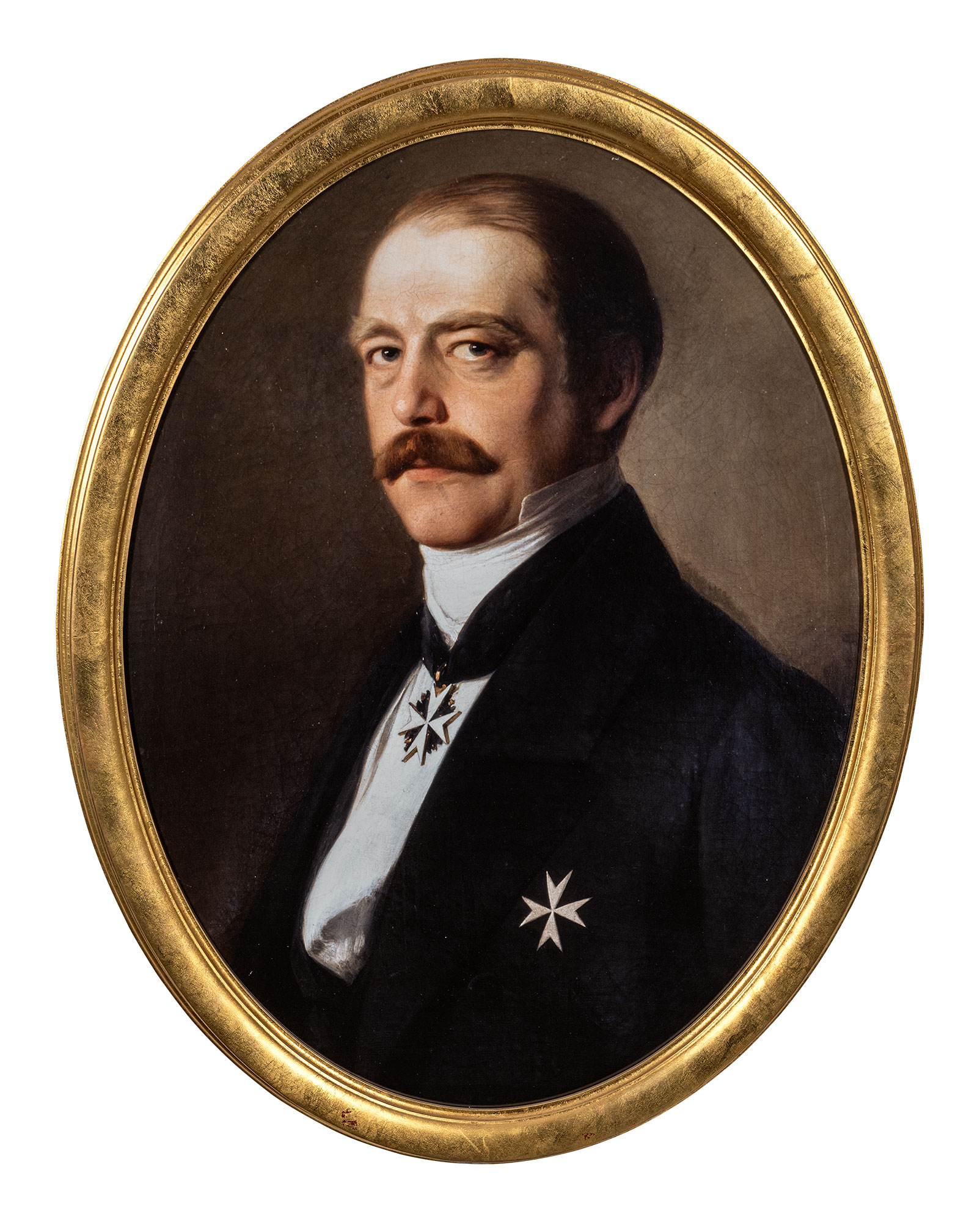
- Otto von Bismarck, one of the famous bearers of this name
- Pronunciation: [ˈɔtoː]
- Gender: masculine

Origin
- Origin: German

Other names
- Related names: Otho, Otis, Thomas

Otto is a masculine German given name and a surname. It originates as an Old High German short form (variants Audo, Odo, Udo) of Germanic names beginning in aud-, an element meaning "wealth, prosperity".

The name is recorded from the 7th century (Odo, son of Uro, courtier of Sigebert III). It was the name of three 10th-century German kings, the first of whom was Otto I the Great, the first Holy Roman Emperor, founder of the Ottonian dynasty.

The Gothic form of the prefix was auda- (as in e.g. Audaþius), the Anglo-Saxon form was ead- (as in e.g. Eadmund), and the Old Norse form was auð-.

Due to Otto von Bismarck, the given name Otto was strongly associated with the German Empire in the later 19th century. It was comparatively frequently given in the United States (presumably in German American families) during the 1880s to 1890s, remaining in the top 100 most popular masculine given names in the US throughout 1880–1898, but its popularity decreased significantly after 1900 with increasing anti-German sentiment leading up to World War I; it fell below rank 200 in 1919, below rank 500 in 1947, and below rank 1000 in 1975. It re-entered the top-1000 most popular given names in the US in the 2010s, ranking 696th as of 2013.

The given name Otis arose from an English surname, which was in turn derived from Ode, a variant form of Odo, Otto.

== People ==
=== Medieval period ===
- Otto (mayor of the palace) (died 643 or 644), mayor of the palace of Austrasia briefly in the mid-7th century
- Otto I, Duke of Saxony (851–912)
- Otto the Great (912–973), East Frankish king and Holy Roman Emperor
- Otto II, Holy Roman Emperor (955–983)
- Otto III, Holy Roman Emperor (980–1002)
- Otto IV, Holy Roman Emperor (1175/1176–1218)
- Otto, Count of Cleves (1278–1310)
- Otto, Count of Lippe-Brake (1589–1657)
- Otto, Duke of Lolland and Estonia (1310–1346)
- Otto, Count of Looz (fl. 980-1000)
- Otto, Count of Vermandois (979–1045)
- Otto, Landgrave of Hesse-Kassel (1594–1617)
- Otto, Lord of Arkel (1330–1396)
- Otto, Lord of Lippe (1300–1360)
- Otto, Margrave of the Nordmark (died 1057)
- Otto of Bamberg (1060/1061–1139), bishop and Catholic saint
- Otto of Freising (c. 1114–1158), bishop and chronicler

=== Modern era ===
- Otto of Greece (1815–1867), King of Greece
- Otto, King of Bavaria (1848–1916), King of Bavaria
- Otto Adler (1929–2014), president of the Jewish Association of Romania
- Otto T. Bannard (1854–1929), American attorney, businessman and philanthropist
- Otto Barić (1933–2020), Croatian footballer and manager
- Otto Barth (artist) (1876–1916), Austrian artist
- Otto Barth (general) (1891–1963), German general
- Otto Brandenburg (1934–2007), Danish musician, singer and actor
- Otto Carius (1922–2015), German tank ace and pharmacist
- Otto Colosser (1878–1948), German politician
- Otto Dickel (1880–1944), German politician
- Otto Diels (1876–1954), German chemist
- Otto Dix (1891–1969), German painter and printmaker
- Otto Dowling (1881–1946), governor of American Samoa
- Otto Eloluoto (born 2008), Finnish footballer
- Otto Fahlgren (born 2001), Swedish actor
- Otto Farrant (born 1996), British actor
- Otto Fischer (footballer) (1901–1941), Austrian football player and coach
- Otto Floto (1863–1929), American sports journalist
- Otto Förschner (1902–1946), German Nazi SS concentration camp commandant
- Otto Forster (born 1937), German mathematician
- Otto Frank (1889–1980), German-born Swiss businessman, father of Anne Frank
- Otto Freundlich (1878–1943), German painter and sculptor
- Otto Graham (1921–2003), professional American football and basketball player
- Otto Graf Lambsdorff (1926–2009), German politician
- Otto Grotewohl (1894–1964), East German politician
- Otto Gutekunst (1866–1947), British art dealer
- Otto Hahn (1879–1968), German chemist
- Otto Hautamo (born 2002), Finnish footballer
- Otto Herschmann (1877–1942), Austrian fencer and swimmer
- Otto Hindrich (born 2002), Romanian footballer
- Otto Kemp (born 1999), American baseball player
- Otto Kemppainen (born 2003), Finnish footballer
- Otto Klemperer (1885–1973), German-born conductor and composer
- Otto Knows (born 1989), Swedish DJ
- Otto Koivula (born 1998), Finnish ice hockey player
- Ottó Komoly (1892–1945) Hungarian humanitarian, engineer, officer and Zionist
- Otto Kraushaar (1901–1989), American academic
- Otto Kretschmer (1912–1998), German World War II U-boat captain
- Otto Lehtisalo (born 2004), Finnish footballer
- Otto Lietchen (1887–1977), American politician
- Otto Lilienthal (1848–1896), German aviator
- Otto Ludvig Beckman (1856–1909), Swedish major general
- Otto Lybeck (1871–1947), Swedish Navy admiral
- Otto Mahler (1873–1895), Bohemian-Austrian composer, brother of Gustav Mahler
- Otto Mears (1840–1931), Russian-American road and railway builder
- Otto Messmer (1892–1983), American animator
- Otto Moll (1915–1946), German SS-Hauptscharführer at Auschwitz concentration camp
- Otto C. Neumeister (1866–1938), American politician
- Otto Ohlendorf (1907–1951), German SS general and Holocaust perpetrator
- Otto Maximiliano Pereira de Cordeiro Ferreira (born 1968), Brazilian singer-songwriter, drummer and TV presenter
- Otto Peterson (1960–2014), American comedian
- Otto Petrén (1912–1990), Swedish jurist
- Otto Porter (born 1993), American basketball player
- Otto Planetta (1899–1934), Austrian Nazi Waffen-SS who murdered Austrian Chancellor Engelbert Dollfuss
- Otto Plath (1885–1940), entomologist, father of American poet Sylvia Plath
- Otto Pohla (1899–1941), Estonian wrestler
- Otto Preminger (1905–1986), Austro–Hungarian-born American film director
- Otto Rehhagel (born 1938), German football coach
- Otto Rosengren (born 2003), Swedish footballer
- Otto Ruoppi (born 2006), Finnish footballer
- Otto Sigfrid Reuter (1876–1945), German völkisch-religious ideologue
- Otto Salmensuu (born 2004), Finnish footballer
- Otto Sauter-Sarto (1884–1958), German actor
- Otto Scheff (1889–1956), Austrian swimmer
- Otto Schily (born 1932), German politician
- Otto Schmitt (field hockey) (born 1965), Argentine field hockey player
- Otto Skorzeny (1908–1975), Austrian-born Waffen-SS commando
- Otto Sohn-Rethel (1877–1949), German painter and lepidopterist
- Otto Soglow (1900–1975), American cartoonist
- Otto Strandman (1875–1941), Estonian politician, Prime Minister in 1919, head of state 1929–1931
- Otto Tief (1889–1976), Estonian politician, military commander, lawyer, Prime Minister
- Otto Toeplitz (1881–1940), German mathematician, specialized in functional analysis
- Otto van Verschuer (1927–2014), Dutch politician
- Otto Christian Archibald von Bismarck (1897–1975), German politician and diplomat
- Otto von Bismarck (1815–1898), Prussian/German statesman
- Otto von Habsburg (1912–2011), head of the House of Habsburg-Lorraine from 1922 to 2007
- Otto Waalkes (born 1948), German comedian and actor
- Otto Wagner (1841–1918), Austrian architect
- Otto Wahle (1879–1963), American swimmer
- Otto F. Walter (1928–1994), Swiss journalist, author and publisher
- Otto Warmbier (1994–2017), American student imprisoned in North Korea
- Otto Weininger (1880–1903), Austrian philosopher
- Otto Wichterle (1913–1998), Czech chemist, inventor soft contact lenses
- Otto S. Wolfbeis (1947–2023), German chemist

== Fictional characters ==
- Otto Anderson, protagonist of the 2022 film A Man Called Otto, played by Tom Hanks
- Otto Delaney, in the television series Sons of Anarchy
- Herr Otto Flick, in the BBC sitcom 'Allo 'Allo!
- Otto Hightower, in the television series House of the Dragon
- Otto Maddox, the main character in the 1984 film Repo Man
- Otto Malpense, the main character in the H.I.V.E. series by Mark Walden
- Otto Mann, in the animated television series The Simpsons
- Otto Octavius, Marvel Comics supervillain Doctor Octopus
- Jake, Jeremiah, and Troy Otto, in the television series Fear the Walking Dead
- Oswald "Otto" Rocket, the main character of Nickelodeon's Rocket Power
- Otto Osworth, the main character of Cartoon Network's Time Squad
- Otto Suwen, in the anime/manga series Re:Zero − Starting Life in Another World
- Otto, the inflatable "auto" pilot in the 1980 comedy film Airplane!
- Otto West, the main antagonist in the 1988 heist comedy A Fish Called Wanda
- Otto, one of the main Minions in the 2022 animated comedy film Minions: The Rise of Gru
- Ottoriki, one of the main characters in American animated children's television series GoGoRiki
- Otto, the friend of Lab Rat in SuperKitties
- Otto, in the children's television series Odd Squad
- Otto, one of the five robot monkeys in the series Super Robot Monkey Team Hyperforce Go!
- Otto, in the 2024 film The Garfield Movie
- Otto, mascot for the Danish gaming convention Fastaval

== See also ==
- Othmar
- Oto (name)
- Auðr (disambiguation)
- Ēðel
