= Emperor Otto =

Emperor Otto may refer to:

- Otto I, Holy Roman Emperor (962-973)
- Otto II, Holy Roman Emperor (967-983)
- Otto III, Holy Roman Emperor (983-1002)
- Otto IV, Holy Roman Emperor (1198–1215)

== See also ==
- Otto von Habsburg, former pretender to the throne of the Austrian Empire
- Otto
