= Oragene =

Oragene is the trade name for DNA Genotek's non-invasive DNA self-collection kit. Oragene allows the collection, stabilization and long-term storage of DNA from saliva at ambient temperature. Oragene first became available to the genetic research community in 2004. Oragene is available in a variety of formats for various markets. In 2011, Oragene•Dx received 510(k) clearance from the U.S. Food and Drug Administration (FDA).

== History ==
Oragene was invented in the early 2000's by Dr. H. Chaim Birnboim. The composition of Oragene is not related to the widely used method of alkaline extraction of plasmid DNA from bacteria. For the first time, genetic researchers had ready access to large amounts of high quality human DNA through a non-invasive, self-collection sampling procedure. Once collected, the DNA is stable at room temperature for many years.

== Features ==
Oragene is used by academic research institutions, bone marrow donor registries, hospitals, clinical testing laboratories, and direct-to-consumer genetic testing companies who require large amounts of high quality DNA from a large number of donors. The non-invasive collection method offered by Oragene allows collection of DNA from those who might be unwilling to provide a blood sample. In addition, Oragene can be sent via the standard postal system providing the ability for customers to scale their operations on a global basis. Oragene can be used to collect more samples from patients and donors with at-home or in-office point-of-care DNA collection.

Oragene is compatible with a variety of downstream applications including microarrays and next generation sequencing.

Oragene is referenced in over 1100 peer-reviewed scientific journals including the following:

- Bocklandt, S; Lin, W; Sehl, ME; Sánchez, FJ; Sinsheimer, JS; et al. (2011). "Epigenetic Predictor of Age". PLoS ONE. 6 (6) e14821. Bibcode:2011PLoSO...614821B. doi:10.1371/journal.pone.0014821. PMC 3120753. PMID 21731603.
- Weseel, J; et al. (2010). "Resequencing of nicotinic acetylcholine receptor genes and association of common and rare variants with the Fagerström test for nicotine dependence". Neuropsychopharmacology. 35 (12): 2392–402. doi:10.1038/npp.2010.120. PMC 3055324. PMID 20736995.
- Koni, AC; et al. (2011). "DNA yield and quality of saliva samples and suitability for large-scale epidemiological studies in children". Int J Obes. 35: 5113–5118. doi:10.1038/ijo.2011.43. PMID 21483410.
