= Genetic testing by country =

Genetic testing, also known as DNA testing, is used to identify changes in DNA sequence or chromosome structure. Genetic testing can also include measuring the results of genetic changes, such as RNA analysis as an output of gene expression, or through biochemical analysis to measure specific protein output. In a medical setting, genetic testing can be used to diagnose or rule out suspected genetic disorders, predict risks for specific conditions, or gain information that can be used to customize medical treatments based on an individual's genetic makeup. Genetic testing can also be used to determine biological relatives, such as a child's biological parentage (genetic mother and father) through DNA paternity testing, or be used to broadly predict an individual's ancestry.

The variety of genetic tests has expanded throughout the years. Early forms of genetic testing which began in the 1950s involved counting the number of chromosomes per cell. Deviations from the expected number of chromosomes (46 in humans) could lead to a diagnosis of certain genetic conditions such as trisomy 21 (Down syndrome) or monosomy X (Turner syndrome). In the 1970s, a method to stain specific regions of chromosomes, called chromosome banding, was developed that allowed more detailed analysis of chromosome structure and diagnosis of genetic disorders that involved large structural rearrangements. In addition to analyzing whole chromosomes (cytogenetics), genetic testing has expanded to include the fields of molecular genetics and genomics which can identify changes at the level of individual genes, parts of genes, or even single nucleotide "letters" of DNA sequence. According to the National Institutes of Health, there are tests available for more than 2,000 genetic conditions, and one study estimated that as of 2018 there were more than 68,000 genetic tests on the market.

== Europe ==
Effective as of May 25, 2018, companies that process genetic data must abide by the General Data Protection Regulation (GDPR) if they are present in the European Union. The GDPR is a set of rules/regulations that helps an individual take control of their data that is collected, used, and stored digitally or in a structured filing system on paper, and restricts a company's use of personal data. The regulation also applies to companies that offer products/services outside the EU.

=== Estonia ===
As part of its healthcare system, Estonia is offering all of its residents genome-wide genotyping. This will be translated into personalized reports for use in everyday medical practice via the national e-health portal.

The aim is to minimise health problems by warning participants most at risk of conditions such as cardiovascular disease and diabetes. It is also hoped that participants who are given early warnings will adopt healthier lifestyles or take preventative drugs.

=== France ===
The legal status of genetic testing in France is regulated under strict privacy and data protection laws, including the Bioethics Law. Direct-to-consumer (DTC) genetic tests, especially those for health-related purposes, are prohibited unless conducted with medical oversight to ensure informed consent and appropriate counseling. This is due to concerns about the potential misuse of genetic data and privacy violations. While health-related genetic testing is allowed within a medical context, tests for non-medical purposes, such as ancestry or personal traits, also face legal restrictions, particularly regarding consumer access.

=== Germany ===
Genetic testing in Germany is governed by the Genetic Diagnostics Act (GenDG), which mandates that health-related genetic tests can only be carried out under medical supervision to ensure the proper interpretation of results and informed decision-making. The law emphasizes genetic counseling and informed consent, protecting individuals from potential misuse or misunderstanding of their genetic data.

== North America ==
=== United States ===
With regard to genetic testing and information in general, legislation in the United States called the Genetic Information Nondiscrimination Act prohibits group health plans and health insurers from denying coverage to a healthy person or charging that person higher premiums based solely on a genetic predisposition to developing a disease in the future. The legislation also bars employers from using genetic information when making hiring, firing, job placement, or promotion decisions. Although GINA protects against genetic discrimination, Section 210 of the law states that once the disease has manifested, employers can use the medical information and not be in violation of the law, even if the condition has a genetic basis. The legislation, the first of its kind in the United States, was passed by the United States Senate on April 24, 2008, on a vote of 95–0, and was signed into law by President George W. Bush on May 21, 2008. It went into effect on November 21, 2009.

In June 2013 the US Supreme Court issued two rulings on human genetics. The Court struck down patents on human genes, opening up competition in the field of genetic testing. The Supreme Court also ruled that police were allowed to collect DNA from people arrested for serious offenses.

== Asia ==
=== Israel ===
The Israeli Knesset passed the Genetic Information Law in 2000, becoming one of the first countries to establish a regulatory framework for the conducting of genetic testing and genetic counseling and for the handling and use identified genetic information. Under the law, genetic tests must be done in labs accredited by the Ministry of Health; however, genetic tests may be conducted outside Israel. The law also forbids discrimination for employment or insurance purposes based on genetic test results. Finally, the law takes a strict approach to genetic testing on minors, which is permitted only for the purpose of finding a genetic match with someone ill for the sake of medical treatment, or to see whether the minor carries a gene related to an illness that can be prevented or postponed.

DNA testing is used to determine if people are eligible for immigration. The policy where "many Jews from the former Soviet Union (FSU) are asked to provide DNA confirmation of their Jewish heritage in the form of paternity tests in order to immigrate as Jews and become citizens under Israel's Law of Return" has generated controversy. Direct-to-consumer ancestry kits cannot be sold in Israel; genetic testing must be performed in licensed medical labs. Paternity tests require a court order.

Under the Genetic Information Law as of 2019, commercial DNA tests are not permitted to be sold directly to the public, but can be obtained with a court order, due to data privacy, reliability, and misinterpretation concerns.

=== Russia ===
Russian law provides that the processing of special categories of personal data relating to race, nationality, political views, religious or philosophical beliefs, health status, intimate life is allowed if it is necessary in connection with the implementation of international agreements of the Russian Federation on readmission and is carried out in accordance with the legislation of the Russian Federation on citizenship of the Russian Federation. Information characterizing the physiological and biological characteristics of a person, based on which it is possible to establish his identity (biometric personal data), can be processed without the consent of the subject of personal data in connection with the implementation of international agreements.

Within the framework of this program, it is also planned to include the peoples of neighboring countries, which are the main source of migration, into the genogeographic study on the basis of existing collections.

=== United Arab Emirates ===
By the end of 2021, the UAE Genome Project will be in full swing, as part of the National Innovation Strategy, establishing strategic partnerships with top medical research centers, and making sustainable investments in healthcare services. The project aims to prevent genetic diseases through the use of genetic sciences and innovative modern techniques related to profiling and genetic sequencing, in order to identify the genetic footprint and prevent the most prevalent diseases in the country, such as obesity, diabetes, hypertension, cancer, and asthma. It aims to achieve personalized treatment for each patient based on genetic factors. Additionally, a study by Khalifa University has identified, for the first time, four genetic markers associated with type 2 diabetes among UAE citizens.
