= Czech Republic–Slovakia football rivalry =

International football rivalry

- Other names: Federal derby
- Location: Europe (UEFA)
- Teams: Czech Republic; Slovakia
- First meeting: Slovakia 1–1 Czech Republic; Friendly (8 May 1995)
- Latest meeting: Czech Republic 2–0 Slovakia; 2020–21 UEFA Nations League B (11 November 2020)

Statistics
- Total meetings: 14
- Most wins: Czech Republic (9)
- Most player appearances: Filip Hološko (5)
- Top scorer: Jan Koller and Tomáš Rosický (3)
- All-time series: Czech Republic: 9 Draw: 2 Slovakia: 3
- Largest victory: Czech Republic 3–0 Slovakia; 1998 FIFA World Cup Q (11 October 1997); Czech Republic 4–1 Slovakia; Friendly (21 August 2002); Slovakia 0–3 Czech Republic; UEFA Euro 2008 Q (6 September 2006); Czech Republic 3–0 Slovakia; Friendly (14 November 2012)

The Czech Republic–Slovakia football rivalry is a highly competitive sports rivalry exists between the national football teams of the two countries, as well as their respective sets of fans. Games between the two teams, even those that are only friendly matches, are often marked by notable and sometimes controversial incidents; though the rivalry is mostly described as friendly and closeness because of historical tie. These matches are also called "Federal derby" or lesser extent, "Brother derby", due to cultural common between both countries.

== Czechoslovakia national football team ==
The Czechoslovakia national football team was the national association football team of Czechoslovakia from 1922 to 1993. At the dissolution of Czechoslovakia at the end of 1992, the team was participating in UEFA qualifying Group 4 for the 1994 World Cup; it completed this campaign under the name Representation of Czechs and Slovaks (RCS). Both the Czech Republic and Slovakia are recognized by FIFA and UEFA as the successors of the Czechoslovakia team.

The Czechoslovakia team was controlled by the Czechoslovak Football Association. The team had two runner-up finishes in World Cups (1934, 1962) and a European Championship win in 1976. Czechoslovakia qualified for the final stages of the 1990 World Cup and shortly afterwards their national coach Jozef Vengloš moved to England to become Aston Villa manager.

== List of matches ==
=== Statistics ===
Matches	Total	Czech Republic wins	Draws	Slovakia wins	Goal difference
All	14	9	2	3	29:12
Competitive	10	7	1	2	21:9
Friendly	4	2	1	1	8:3

=== Games ===
8 May 1995 Friendly	Slovakia	1–1	Czech Republic	Bratislava
	Timko 58'		Šmejkal 32'	Stadium: Tehelne pole Attendance: 10,000; Referee: Leif Sundell (Sweden)

24 August 1997 1998 FIFA World Cup qualification	Slovakia	2–1	Czech Republic	Bratislava
	Jančula 45'; Majoroš 55'	Report	Šmicer 15'	Stadium: Tehelne pole Attendance: 22,500; Referee: Piero Ceccarini (Italy)

11 October 1997 1998 FIFA World Cup qualification	Czech Republic	3–0	Slovakia	Prague
	Šmicer 54'; Siegl 70'; Novotný 73'	Report		Stadium: Sparta; Attendance: 5,428; Referee: Urs Meier (Switzerland)

21 August 2002 Friendly	Czech Republic	4–1	Slovakia	Olomouc
	Koller 32', 65'; Rosický 71', 79'		Sz. Németh 16'	Stadium: Andrův stadion Attendance: 11,986; Referee: Georgios Douros (Greece)

6 September 2006 UEFA Euro 2008 qualification	Slovakia	0–3	Czech Republic	Bratislava
		Report	Sionko 10', 21'; Koller 57'	Stadium: Tehelne pole Attendance: 27,683; Referee: Steve Bennett (England)

17 November 2007 UEFA Euro 2008 qualification	Czech Republic	3–1	Slovakia	Prague
	Grygera 13'; Kulič 76'; Rosický 83'	Report	Kadlec 79' (o.g.)	Stadium: AXA Arena; Attendance: 15,681; Referee: Tony Asumaa (Finland)

1 April 2009 2010 FIFA World Cup qualification	Czech Republic	1–2	Slovakia	Prague
	Jankulovski 30'	Report	Šesták 22'; Jendrišek 82'	Stadium: AXA Arena; Attendance: 14,956; Referee: Alberto Undiano Mallenco (Spain)

5 September 2009 2010 FIFA World Cup qualification	Slovakia	2–2	Czech Republic	Bratislava
	Šesták 59'; Hamšík 73' (pen.)	Report	Pudil 68'; Baroš 83'	Stadium: Tehelné pole Attendance: 23,800; Referee: Tom Henning Øvrebø (Norway)

14 November 2012 Friendly	Czech Republic	3–0	Slovakia	Olomouc
	Lafata 3', 6'; Dočkal 72'	Report		Stadium: Andrův stadion Attendance: 11,464; Referee: Harald Lechner (Austria)

31 March 2015 Friendly	Slovakia	1–0	Czech Republic	Žilina
	Duda 49'	Report		Stadium: Štadión pod Dubňom; Attendance: 10,524; Referee: István Vad (Hungary)

13 October 2018 2018–19 Nations League B	Slovakia	1–2	Czech Republic	Trnava
	Hamšík 62'		Krmenčík 52'; Schick 76'	Stadium: Anton Malatinský Stadium; Attendance: 17,251; Referee: Slavko Vinčić (Slovenia)

19 November 2018 2018–19 Nations League B	Czech Republic	1–0	Slovakia	Prague
	Schick 32'			Stadium: Sinobo Stadium; Attendance: 16,623; Referee: Alejandro Hernández Hernández (Spain)

4 September 2020 2020–21 Nations League B	Slovakia	1–3	Czech Republic	Bratislava
	Schranz 88'		Coufal 48'; Dočkal 53' (pen.); Krmenčík 86'	Stadium: Tehelné pole Attendance: 0 Referee: Andris Treimanis (Latvia)

18 November 2020 2020–21 Nations League B	Czech Republic	2–0	Slovakia	Prague
	Souček 17'; Ondrášek 55'	Report		Stadium: Sinobo Stadium; Referee: Cüneyt Çakır (Turkey)

== See also ==
- Czechoslovakia national football team
- Czech Republic national football team
- Slovakia national football team
- Czech Republic–Slovakia ice hockey rivalry
