= Unni =

Unni may refer to:

== People ==
- Unni (Indian name)
- Unni (Norwegian given name)
- Unni (bishop) 9th century German bishop

== Indian Malayalam films ==
- Unni (1989 film)
- Unni (2007 film)
- Unni Vanna Divasam (1984)

== Other uses ==
- Unni appam, an Indian snack
