= Audo =

Audo is a surname. Notable people with the surname include:

- Antoine Audo (born 1946), Syrian Chaldean bishop
- Joseph VI Audo (1790–1878), Iraqi Chaldean patriarch
- Toma Audo (1854–1918), Iraqi Chaldean archbishop

== See also ==
- Otto
- Odo
- Udo
