= Slovakia national football team =

Men's association football team

Slovakia
- Nicknames: Sokoli/Sokolíci (The Falcons); Repre (The Representation)
- Association: Slovenský Futbalový zväz (SFZ)
- Confederation: UEFA (Europe)
- Head coach: (Slovakia) Vladimír Weiss sr.
- Captain: Milan Škriniar
- Most caps: Marek Hamšík; Peter Pekarík (138)
- Top scorer: Marek Hamšík (26)
- Home stadium: Tehelné pole; Štadión Antona Malatinského; Košická futbalová aréna
- FIFA code: SVK
First colours	Second colours

FIFA ranking
- Current: 47 ▼2 (18 November 2026)
- Highest: 14 (August 2015)
- Lowest: 150 (December 1993)

First international
- (1939–1945): Slovakia 2–0 Germany (Bratislava, Slovakia; 27 August 1939) (1993–present): Unofficial: Lithuania 0–1 Slovakia (Vilnius, Lithuania; 14 October 1992); Official: United Arab Emirates 0–1 Slovakia (Dubai, United Arab Emirates; 2 February 1994)

Biggest win
- Slovakia 7–0 Liechtenstein (Bratislava, Slovakia; 8 September 2004); Slovakia 7–0 San Marino (Dubnica nad Váhom, Slovakia; 13 October 2007); Slovakia 7–0 San Marino (Bratislava, Slovakia; 6 June 2009)

Biggest defeat
- Argentina 6–0 Slovakia (Mendoza, Argentina; 22 June 1995); Sweden 6–0 Slovakia (Abu Dhabi, United Arab Emirates; 17 January 2017); Germany 6–0 Slovakia (Leipzig, Germany; 17 November 2025)

World Cup
- Appearances: 9 as Czechoslovakia (first in 1934); 1 as Slovakia (in 2010)
- Best result: As Czechoslovakia: Runners-up (1934, 1962); As Slovakia: Round of 16 (2010)

European Championship
- Appearances: 6 (first in 1960 as Czechoslovakia; 2016 as Slovakia)
- Best result: As Czechoslovakia: Champions (1976); As Slovakia: Round of 16 (2016, 2024)
Medal record
FIFA World Cup
Silver medal – second place	1934 Italy	Team
Silver medal – second place	1962 Chile	Team
UEFA European Championship
Gold medal – first place	1976 Yugoslavia	Team
Bronze medal – third place	1960 France	Team
Bronze medal – third place	1980 Italy	Team
Olympic Games
Gold medal – first place	1980 Moscow	Team
Silver medal – second place	1964 Tokyo	Team

The Slovakia national football team (Slovak: Slovenská futbalová reprezentácia) represents Slovakia in men's international football competition and it is governed by the Slovak Football Association (SFZ), the governing body for football in Slovakia. Slovakia's home stadium from 2019 is the reconstructed Tehelné pole in Bratislava. Historically, up to the split in 1993, the team participated mostly as Czechoslovakia, while it also competed as Slovakia during Second World War.

Since 1993, Slovakia has qualified for four major international tournaments: the 2010 FIFA World Cup, UEFA Euro 2016, UEFA Euro 2020, and UEFA Euro 2024. Slovakia qualified for the former tournament after winning their qualifying group, where they progressed beyond the group stage after a 3–2 victory against Italy, before bowing out of the tournament following a 2–1 defeat in the knockout stage against the eventual runners-up Netherlands. It was the first time the newly-independent national team had ever played in a major football competition, having played in every FIFA World Cup qualifying campaign since 1998 and every UEFA European Championship qualifying campaign since 1996.

== History ==
=== Slovak Republic and Czechoslovakia ===
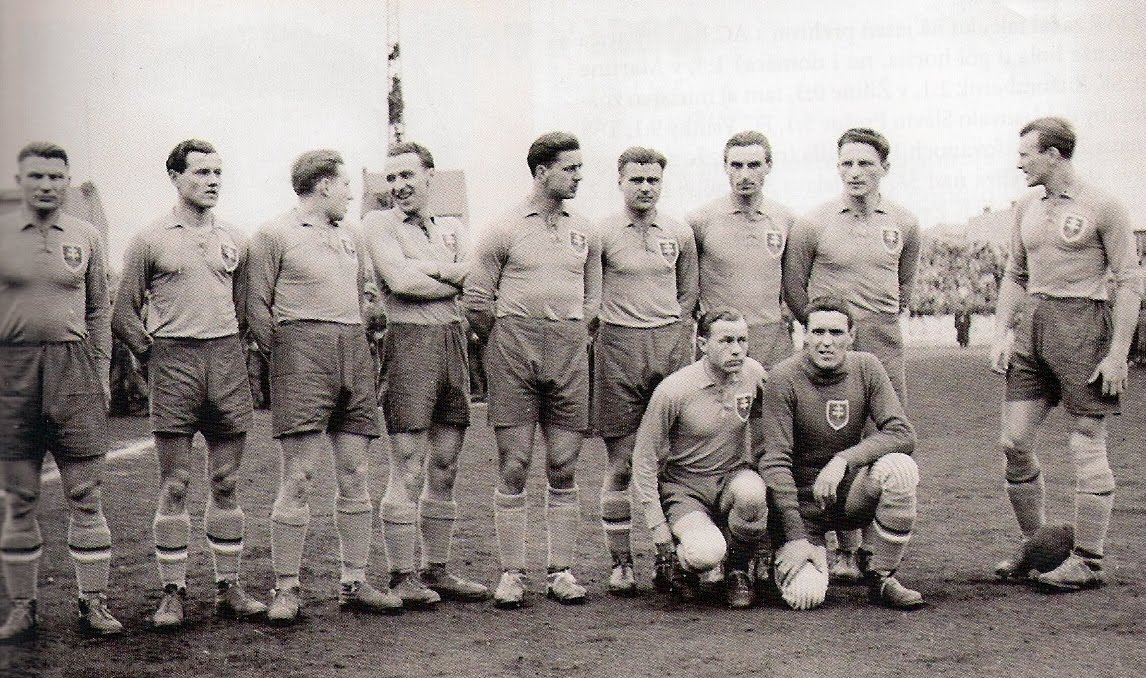
The Slovakia national team in 1940

The first official match of the first Slovak Republic was played in Bratislava against Germany on 27 August 1939, and ended in a 2–0 victory for Slovakia. The Slovaks played numerous friendly matches during the Second World War, all against Axis-aligned nations.

After the Second World War, the national football team was subsumed into the team of Czechoslovakia, and for over 50 years Slovakia played no matches as an independent country. During this period, they contributed several key players to the Czechoslovak team, including the majority of the team that won the UEFA Euro 1976 (eight of the eleven players who defeated West Germany in the final were Slovak).

=== 1994–present: Slovakia ===
Slovakia's first official international after regaining independence was a 1–0 victory in Dubai over the United Arab Emirates on 2 February 1994. Their first home match was a 4–1 victory against Croatia in Bratislava on 20 April 1994. Slovakia suffered their biggest defeat since independence (6–0) on 22 June 1995 in Mendoza against Argentina. Their biggest victories (7–0) have come against Liechtenstein in 2004 as well as San Marino (twice) in 2007 and 2009.

Slovakia attempted qualifying for a major championship as an independent team for the first time in Euro 1996 qualifying, but finished in third place in their qualifying group, behind Romania and France, recording wins against Poland, Israel and Azerbaijan, twice. In the 1998 World Cup qualifiers, Slovakia finished fourth in their six-team group with five wins, one draw, and four defeats. Their first four games in this were all wins, one of them against their Czech neighbors, helping the team reach their highest FIFA World Ranking to date, 17th.

Slovakia came close to securing a berth at the 2006 FIFA World Cup in Germany after finishing second in their group ahead of Russia and behind Portugal, before being eliminated by Spain in their qualification play-off, 6–2 on aggregate.

==== 2010 FIFA World Cup ====
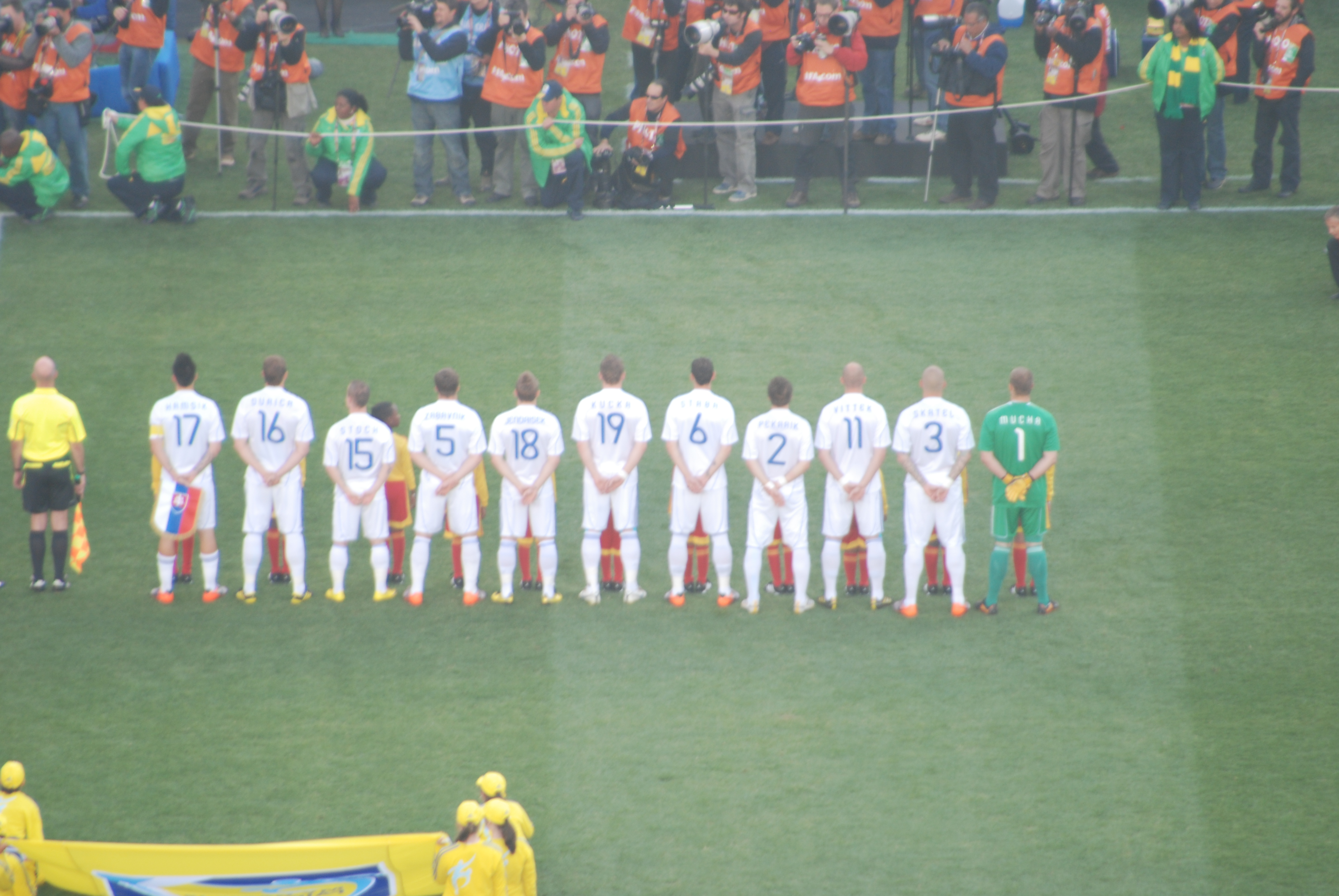
The Slovakia national team before the match against Italy at the 2010 FIFA World Cup

Slovakia participated in the FIFA World Cup for the first time as an independent nation after finishing in first in Group 3 of 2010 World Cup qualification ahead of Slovenia, Czech Republic, Northern Ireland, and Poland. On 14 October 2009, they clinched qualification with a 1–0 away victory against Poland. On 24 June 2010, at the tournament proper, Slovakia finished second in the group stage after defeating reigning champions Italy in a game which ESPN dubbed "epic": the game saw three goals being scored after the 80th minute, two by Italy and one by Slovakia, as well as a disallowed goal by Italy flagged offside by "the tightest of decisions". The result led Slovakia to the knockout stage and eliminated Italy, who finished last in the group. The result of this match meant that for the first time in World Cup history, both finalists from the previous tournament had been eliminated in the first round, champion Italy and runner-up France.

In the round of 16, Slovakia played the Netherlands in the round of 16, falling behind 2–0 only to score a late goal from the penalty spot by striker Róbert Vittek, the last kick of the game in a 2–1 defeat. Despite elimination, Vittek's goal returned him to the top of the goalscoring charts, joint top with David Villa, until Villa himself later scored against Portugal in Spain's 1–0 victory in the same stage of the tournament.

==== UEFA Euro 2012 ====
In the UEFA Euro 2012 qualifying, Slovakia was drawn against Russia, the Republic of Ireland, Armenia, Macedonia and Andorra. The campaign in South Africa boosted team performance ahead of the qualifiers, which started in September with two 1–0 wins against Macedonia at Štadión Pasienky and Russia away. However, in October, they were easily beaten in Armenia (3–1) and drew 1–1 against the Republic of Ireland at home. In February 2011, the team was stunned in a 2–1 friendly defeat against Luxembourg and could only beat group minnows Andorra by one goal. Despite creating better chances, Slovakia earned a goalless draw with Ireland away. Four days later, after creating chances in a goalless first half, Slovakia conceded four goals to Armenia in a match that eliminated the team. In the final two group matches, Slovakia was beaten at home by Russia (1–0) and drew 1–1 in Macedonia, finishing in a mediocre fourth-place position and scoring only seven goals in the entire process. For the first time since the Euro 1996 qualifying process, Slovakia finished a qualifying campaign with a negative goal differential. As a result of this outcome, coach Vladimír Weiss left his job after four full years, being replaced by his assistants Michal Hipp and Stanislav Griga, although both themselves were later replaced due to poor results.

By late June, former Czechoslovakia national team footballer Ján Kozák became the head coach after the unsuccessful qualifying campaign with a victory in Bosnia and Herzegovina followed by two defeats to Bosnia and Greece.

==== UEFA Euro 2016 ====
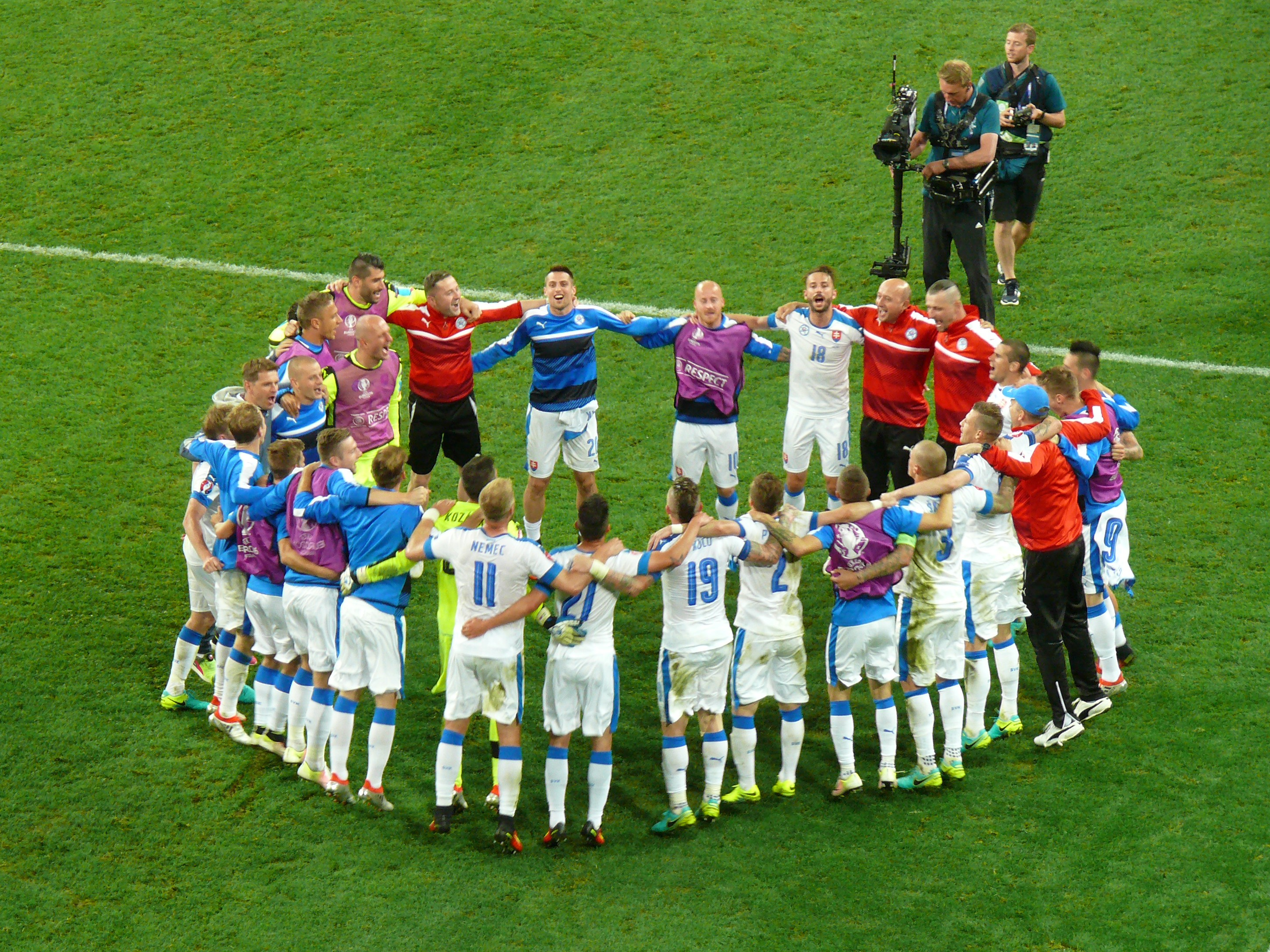
A celebration of Slovak players after the match against Russia at UEFA Euro 2016

In the UEFA Euro 2016 qualifying, Slovakia was drawn against Spain, Ukraine, Belarus, Macedonia and Luxembourg. Slovakia began the qualifying campaign with a 1–0 victory against Ukraine in Kyiv. On 9 October 2014, Slovakia beat Spain 2–1 in a shock victory and claimed the first place. Slovakia's 3–1 victory over Belarus confirmed their status as group leaders. Later on, they won 2–0 against Macedonia in the Philip II Arena, beat Luxembourg with a score of 3–0 in Žilina, and beat Macedonia 2–1 on 14 June 2015, also in Žilina. The next matches were a 2–0 defeat against Spain, a goalless draw against Ukraine, and a shocking 0–1 home defeat against Belarus. Slovakia finished qualification by defeating Luxembourg 4–2 and got the second place, qualifying to their fourth European Championship, first as an independent nation.

Slovakia was drawn in Group B of Euro 2016 alongside England, Russia, and Wales. Slovakia began their tournament against Wales where Ondrej Duda scored Slovakia's first goal in the history of the European Championship in an eventual 2–1 defeat. Slovakia defeated Russia 2–1 with goals from Vladimír Weiss III and Marek Hamšík, then a goalless draw against England to advance to the round of 16 as one of the tournament's best third-placed teams. They were eliminated at this stage by 2014 FIFA World Cup champion Germany with a 3–0 defeat.

==== 2018 FIFA World Cup qualification ====
During the qualification campaign for the 2018 World Cup, Slovakia was drawn in UEFA Group F. They were third in the group after the penultimate match ended in a 1–0 defeat to Scotland, who moved up to second place. Slovakia won their final group match 3–0 against Malta, and overtook Scotland after they failed to beat Slovenia, but they missed out on a play-off place as the other second teams' results went against them, meaning Slovakia finished as the worst group runners-up.

==== UEFA Euro 2020 ====
Slovakia qualified for the UEFA Euro 2020 after a difficult away victory against Northern Ireland. Being drawn with Spain, Sweden. and Poland in group E, Slovakia beat Poland 2–1. However, Slovakia subsequently lost to Sweden 0–1 before getting thrashed by Spain 5–0, thus finishing third with the worst goal difference due to scoring own goals as a result of their performance. Slovakia was eliminated in the group stage for the first time ever.

==== 2022 FIFA World Cup qualification ====
The country finished third in 2022 World Cup qualifying behind Croatia and Russia, the latter of which would be banned from the final tournament due to the country's invasion of Ukraine. Despite the third-place finish in the group, the team dropped points to footballing minnows Cyprus and Malta.

==== UEFA Euro 2024 ====
After numerous poor results in the UEFA Euro 2024 qualifying, former Napoli coach Francesco Calzona was appointed as the manager on 30 August 2022. This meant Slovakia was placed as low as the fifth pot for the qualifying phase of the tournament, the worst position the country has ever been in and realistically must qualify directly for UEFA Euro 2024. Slovakia was drawn into a group with Portugal, Bosnia and Herzegovina, Iceland, Luxembourg, and Liechtenstein. After a poor goalless draw in the first match against Luxembourg, the team won seven and lost two matches in total, both being narrow losses against Portugal (0–1 at home and 3–2 away). As a result, Slovakia qualified automatically for Euro 2024 by finishing second in their qualifying group.

The team was drawn in Group E of Euro 2024, together with Belgium, Ukraine, and Romania. In Frankfurt on 17 June, Slovakia produced one of the biggest shocks in the history of the tournament by beating Belgium 1–0.

Slovakia eventually progressed to the knockout stage of the tournament. In the round of 16, they faced eventual runner-up England and lost 2-1 in extra time. Ivan Schranz became the joint-UEFA European Football Championship Top Goalscorer of Euro 2024.

== Stadium ==
The Slovakia national football team plays its home matches at the Tehelné pole in Bratislava and the Štadión Antona Malatinského in Trnava. Štadión pod Dubňom in Žilina was used from 2003 to 2015, but cannot be used because of artificial grass installation in 2016. In the past, home games have occasionally been played at other venues including Všešportový areál and Štadión Lokomotívy in Košice, Štadión pod Zoborom in Nitra, Mestský štadión in Dubnica nad Váhom, and Tatran Stadion in Prešov.

Stadia which have hosted Slovakia international football matches:

Slovakia national football team home stadiums
Nr. of matches	Stadium	Capacity	Location	First match	Last match
65	Tehelné pole	22,500	Bratislava	v. Germany (2–0); 27 August 1939	v. Romania (2-0); 31 March 2026
38	Štadión Antona Malatinského	19,200	Trnava	v. Bulgaria (0–0); 24 April 1996	v. Estonia (1–0); 19 November 2024
21	Štadión pod Dubňom	11,258	Žilina	v. Greece (2–2); 30 April 2003	v. Iceland (3–1); 17 November 2015
9	Pasienky	11,591	Bratislava	v. Israel (1–0); 18 August 1999	v. Greece (0–1); 16 October 2012
4	Všešportový areál	30,312	Košice	v. Russia (2–1); 8 March 1995	v. Romania (0–2); 15 November 1995
3	Košická futbalová aréna	12,555	Košice	v. Azerbaijan (2–0); 8 September 2024	v. Montenegro (2–2); 5 June 2026
2	Štadión pod Zoborom	7,480	Nitra	v. Belarus (4–0); 27 March 1996	v. Saudi Arabia (1–1); 24 May 2000
2	Štadión Lokomotívy	9,000	Košice	v. Finland (0–0); 19 August 1998	v. Azerbaijan (3–0); 5 September 1998
2	Mestský štadión	5,450	Dubnica nad Váhom	v. Liechtenstein (2–0); 8 September 1999	v. San Marino (7–0); 13 October 2007
2	MOL Aréna	12,700	Dunajská Streda	v. Lithuania (2–2); 30 March 1993	v. Malta (2–1); 1 June 2026
1	Futbalový štadión Prievidza	9,000	Prievidza	v. Slovenia (2–0); 16 November 1993	
1	Štadión na Sihoti	6,366	Trenčín	v. Moldova (4–2); 5 September 2001	
1	Štadión Tatranu	5,410	Prešov	v. Uzbekistan (4–1); 14 May 2002	
1	ViOn Aréna	4,008	Zlaté Moravce	v. Iceland (1–2); 26 March 2008	
1	NTC Senec	3,264	Senec	v. Montenegro (2–0); 23 May 2014	

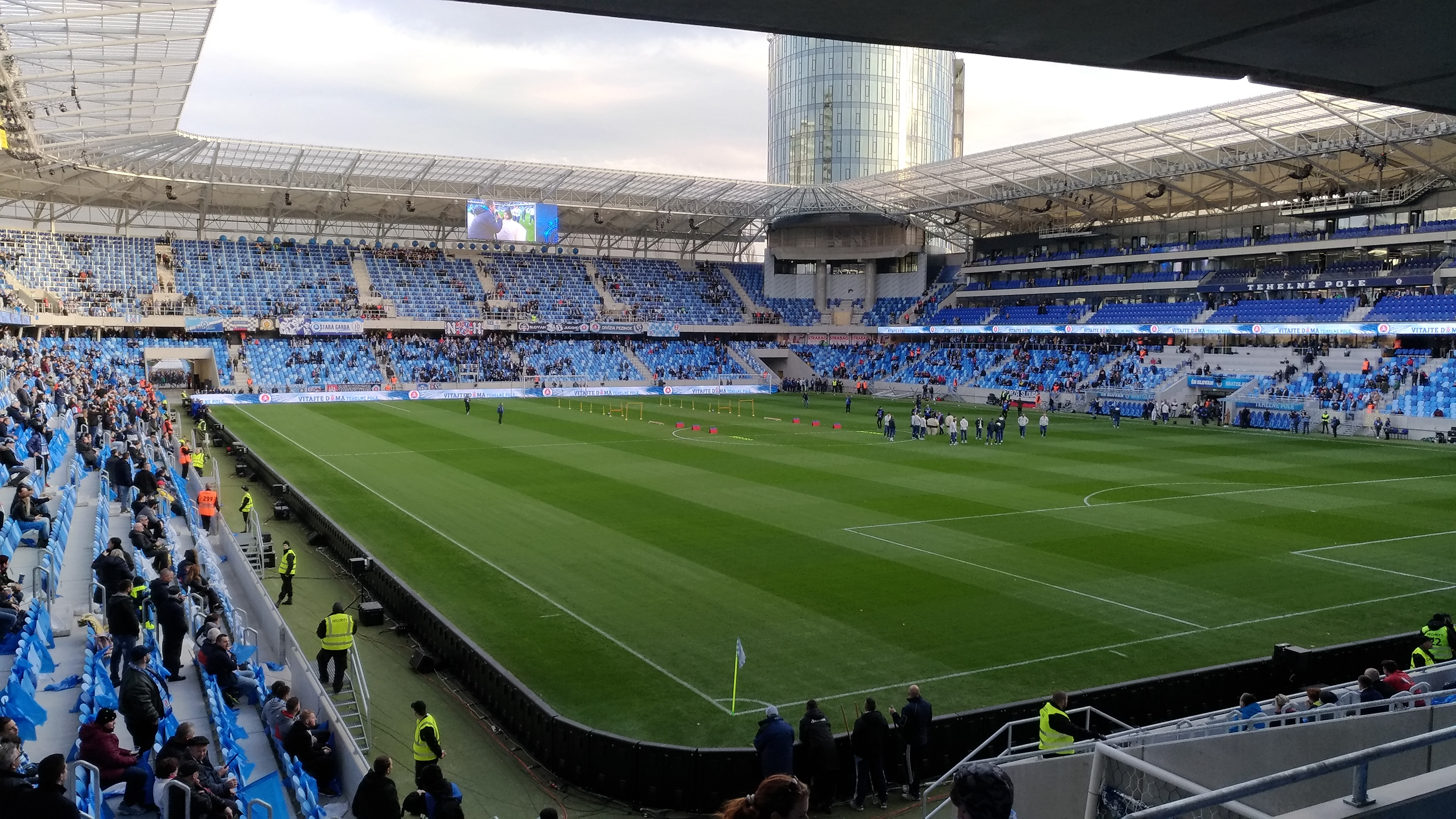
Tehelné Pole

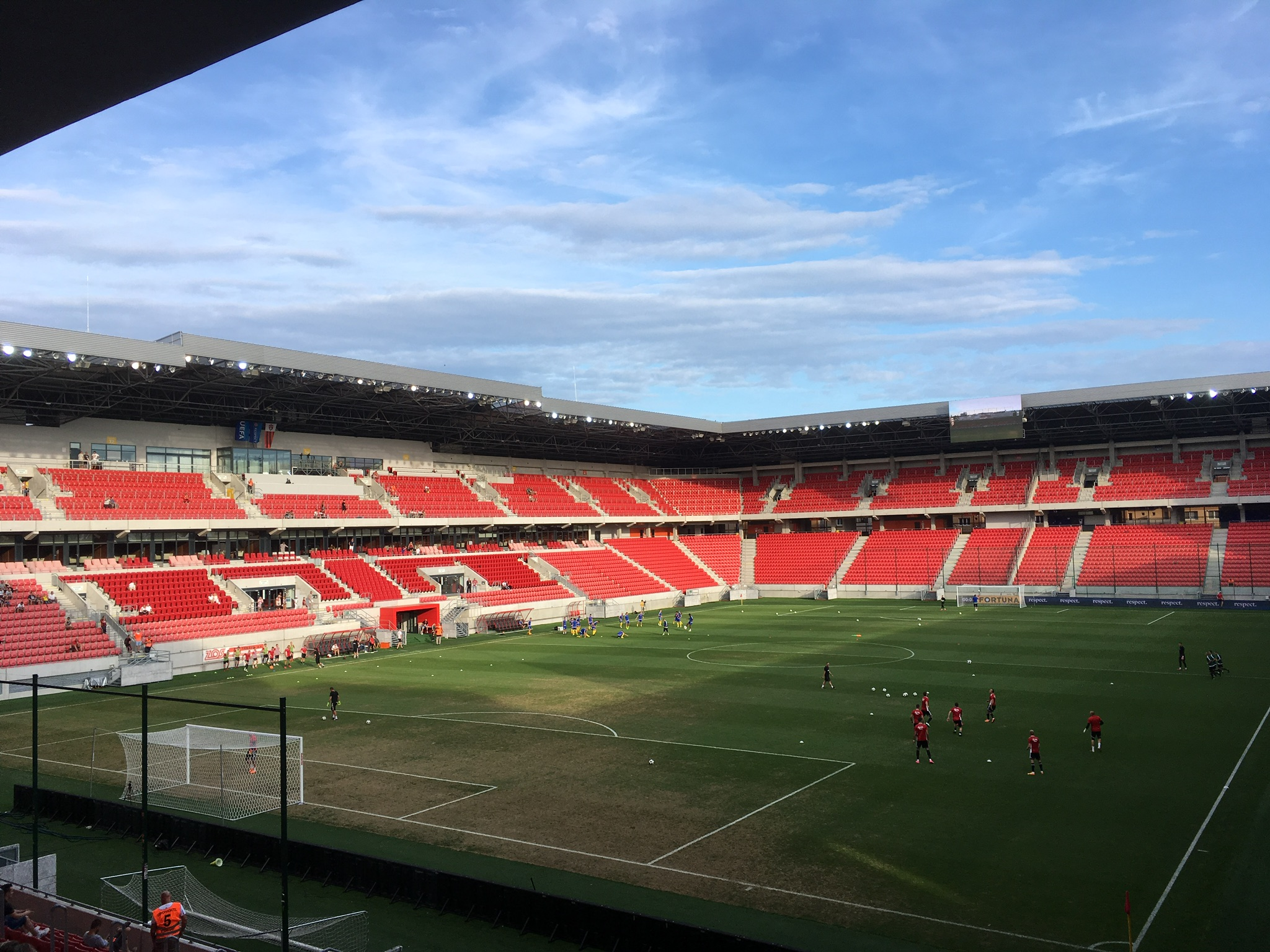
Štadión Antona Malatinského

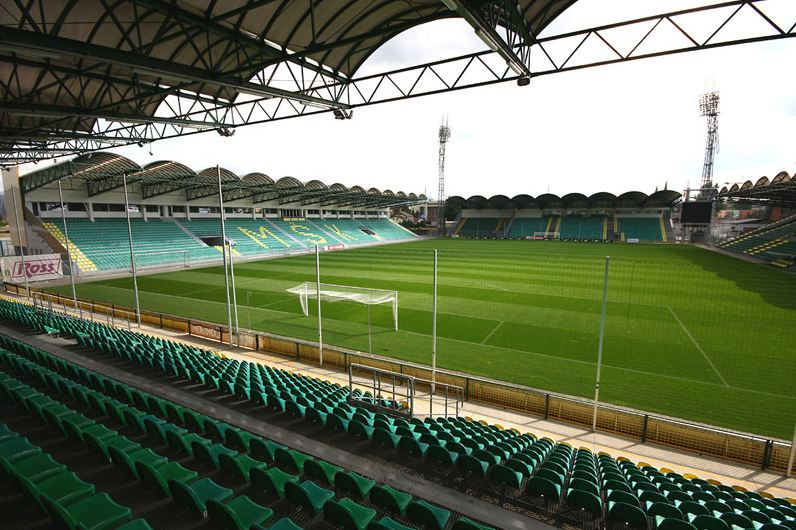
Pod Dubňom

== Team image ==
=== Nickname ===
The team is typically referred to as the Repre (short for Reprezentácia, which translates into national team). However, in 2016, during the buildup to Slovakia's first appearance at the European Championship, Slovak Football Association introduced a new nickname for the team. The national team was given the nickname Slovenskí sokoli (lit. 'Slovak Falcons'). The U15 to U21 national teams were given the nickname Slovenskí sokolíci (lit. 'Slovak Little Falcons'). Despite a lack of immediate identification with the nickname by the fans, it went into usage during the tournament and the subsequent qualification for the 2018 World Cup and is now often used, especially in the media, along with Repre, which still remains to be preferred in an informal conversation.

=== Kit ===
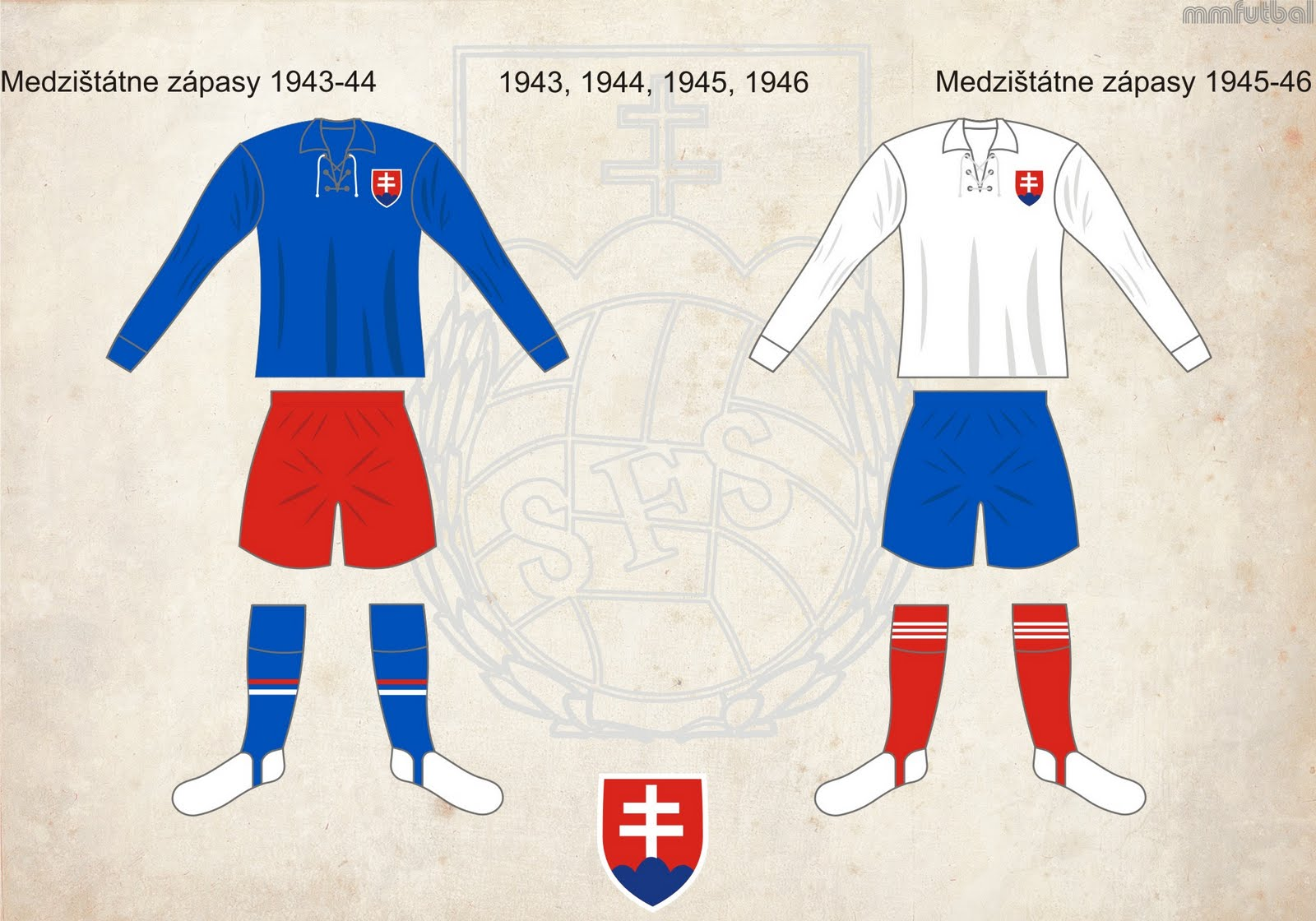
Slovakia kits from 1943 to 1946

Slovakia's home kit since 1993 has been blue, which was temporarily changed from blue to white from 2020. The players were either a set of white jerseys, shorts, and socks – or a set of blue jerseys, shorts and socks. A combination of a blue jersey and white shorts has also been used in some matches. Puma supplied the kits from February 2012 until 2016. In 2016, Nike took over the supply of the national team, which it had previously done from 1995 to 2005. In 2024, Italian brand Macron became the kit supplier for Slovakia.

Supplier	Period
Le Coq Sportif	1993–1995
Nike	1995–2005
Adidas	2006–2011
Puma	2012–2016
Nike	2016–2024
Macron	2024–

== Results and fixtures ==
The following is a list of match results in the last 12 months, as well as any future matches that have been scheduled.

Win Draw Loss Fixture

=== 2026 ===
26 March 2026 2026 World Cup qualification play-offs	Slovakia	3–4	Kosovo	Bratislava, Slovakia
20:45 UTC+1	Valjent 6'; Haraslín 45'; Strelec 90+4'	Report	Hodža 21'; Asllani 47'; Muslija 60'; Hajrizi 72'	Stadium: Tehelné pole Attendance: 20,113; Referee: Espen Eskås (Norway)

31 March 2026 Friendly	Slovakia	2–0	Romania	Bratislava, Slovakia
20:45 UTC+2	Birligea 7' (o.g.); Strelec 46'	Report		Stadium: Tehelné pole Attendance: 8,043; Referee: Ondrej Berka (Czech Republic)

1 June 2026 Friendly	Slovakia	2–1	Malta	Dunajská Streda, Slovakia
18:00 UTC+2	Haraslín 9'; Galčík 90+7'	Report	Mbong 37'	Stadium: MOL Aréna; Attendance: 5,721; Referee: Mihály Káprály (Hungary)

5 June 2026 Friendly	Slovakia	2–2	Montenegro	Košice, Slovakia
18:30 UTC+2	Boženík 6'; Duda 74'	Report	Osmajić 44', 66' (pen.)	Stadium: Košická futbalová aréna Attendance: 10,432; Referee: Wojciech Myć (Poland)

26 September 2026 2026–27 Nations League	Slovakia	2–0	Moldova	Prešov, Slovakia
20:45 UTC+2	Schranz 32'; Duda 40' (pen.)	Report		Stadium: Tatran Stadium; Attendance: 6,003; Referee: Juxhin Xhaja (Albania)

29 September 2026 2026–27 Nations League	Slovakia	2–1	Kazakhstan	Košice, Slovakia
20:45 UTC+2	Sauer 26'; Hancko 82'	Report	Karimov 35'	Stadium: Košická futbalová aréna Attendance: 9,109; Referee: Patrik Kolarić (Croatia)

2 October 2026 2026–27 Nations League	Faroe Islands	1–1	Slovakia	Tórshavn, Faroe Islands
19:45 UTC+1	Justinussen 66'	Report	Vatnhamar 38' (o.g.)	Stadium: Tórsvøllur; Attendance: 2,853; Referee: Mohammed Al-Hakim (Sweden)

6 October 2026 2026–27 Nations League	Moldova	0–4	Slovakia	Chișinău, Moldova
21:45 UTC+3		Report	Strelec 8'; Suslov 44'; Hancko 60'; Haraslín 75'	Stadium: Stadionul Zimbru; Attendance: 5,942; Referee: Yigal Frid (Israel)

13 November 2026 2026–27 Nations League	Slovakia	2–2	Faroe Islands	Košice, Slovakia
20:45 UTC+1	Prekop 17'; Haraslín 74'	Report	Davidsen 30'; Samuelsen 47' (pen.)	Stadium: Košická futbalová aréna Attendance: 11,013; Referee: Mohammad Al-Emara (Finland)

16 November 2026 2026–27 Nations League	Kazakhstan	2–2	Slovakia	Astana, Kazakhstan
20:00 UTC+5	Chesnokov 29'; Vorogovsky 65'	Report	Boženík 56'; Kaprálik 90+5'	Stadium: Astana Arena; Attendance: 13,244; Referee: Aliyar Aghayev (Azerbaijan)

== Coaching staff ==
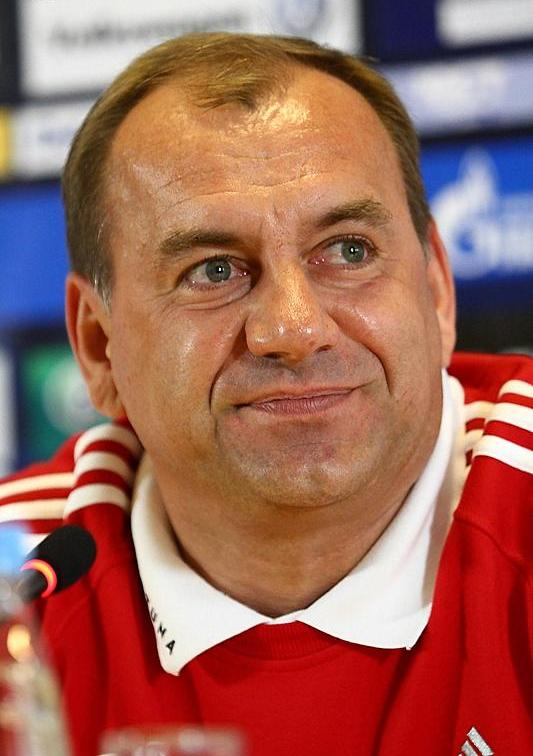
Current head coach Vladimír Weiss

As of May 2026

Position	Name
Head coach	Vladimír Weiss
Assistant coach	Marek Hamšík Štefan Markulík Ľuboš Benkovský Vladimír Weiss jr.
Goalkeeping coach	Ján Novota
Technical directors	Oto Brunegraf (Czech Republic) Roman Pivarník
Fitness coach	Dávid Brünn
Doctors	Jozef Almási; Zsolt Fegyveres
Masseur	Mário Prelovský
Physiotherapists	Marián Drinka Peter Hečko Martin Nozdrovický
Video analyst	vacant
Custodians	Ján Beniak Marek Košáň

=== Coaching history ===
1939–1944

Name	Period	Pld	W	D	L	GF	GA	GD	PG
(Slovak Republic (1939–1945)) Vojtech Závodský	1939	1	1	0	0	2	0	+1	3.00
(Slovak Republic (1939–1945)) Rudolf Hanák	1939–1940	2	1	0	1	5	4	+1	1.50
(Slovak Republic (1939–1945)) Štefan Priboj	1940–1941	4	0	1	3	5	10	−5	0.08
(Slovak Republic (1939–1945)) Štefan Čambal	1941–1942	2	0	0	2	1	6	−5	0.00
(Slovak Republic (1939–1945)) Ferdinand Daučík	1942–1944	7	1	1	5	10	24	−14	0.19
Total		16	3	2	11	23	44	−21	0.69

1993–present

Name	Period	Pld	W	D	L	GF	GA	GD	PG
(Slovakia) Jozef Vengloš	6 April 1993 – 15 June 1995	16	5	4	7	21	30	−9	1.19
(Slovakia) Jozef Jankech	4 July 1995 – 23 October 1998	34	18	6	10	51	33	+18	1.76
(Slovakia) Dušan Radolský (Note: Managed the team against Poland at 10 November 1998 on a caretaker basis)	10 November 1998	1	0	0	1	1	3	−2	0.00
(Slovakia) Dušan Galis	1 January 1999 – 23 February 1999	0	0	0	0	0	0	0	0.00
(Slovakia) Jozef Adamec	26 February 1999 – 30 November 2001	34	13	11	10	38	31	+7	1.47
(Slovakia) Anton Dragúň (Note: As assistant coach, Dragúň managed the team during the tour of Central and South America)	17 November 1999 – 25 November 2001	4	1	0	3	2	7	−5	0.25
(Slovakia) Stanislav Griga (Note: Led the team during 2001 Merdeka Tournament in Kuala Lumpur, Malaysia.)	21 June 2001 – 25 June 2001	3	1	0	2	2	3	−1	1.00
(Slovakia) Ladislav Jurkemik	1 February 2002 – 31 December 2003	19	6	5	8	27	26	+1	1.21
(Slovakia) Dušan Galis	1 January 2004 – 12 October 2006	31	12	12	7	53	36	+17	1.55
(Slovakia) Ján Kocian	2 November 2006 – 30 June 2008	17	3	5	9	30	28	+2	0.82
(Slovakia) Vladimír Weiss	7 July 2008 – 31 January 2012	40	16	8	16	56	53	+3	1.40
(Slovakia) Michal Hipp (Note: Managed the team against Turkey on 29 February 2012 on a caretaker basis)	1 January 2012 – 29 February 2012	1	1	0	0	2	1	+1	3.00
(Slovakia) Stanislav Griga (Slovakia) Michal Hipp	26 April 2012 – 13 June 2013	12	3	4	5	11	14	−3	0.92
(Slovakia) Ján Kozák	2 July 2013 – 14 October 2018	56	29	10	17	81	57	+24	1.73
(Slovakia) Štefan Tarkovič (Note: Managed the team against Sweden on 16 October 2018 on caretaker basis)	15 October 2018 – 21 October 2018	1	0	1	0	1	1	0	1.00
(Czech Republic) Pavel Hapal	22 October 2018 – 16 October 2020	16	6	4	6	25	20	+5	1.38
(Slovakia) Oto Brunegraf (Note: Managed the team against Israel on 14 October 2020 on caretaker basis)	14 October 2020	1	0	0	1	2	3	−1	0.00
(Slovakia) Štefan Tarkovič	20 October 2020 – 7 June 2022	22	8	7	7	26	24	+2	1.41
(Slovakia) Samuel Slovák (Note: Managed the team on caretaker basis on 10 and 13 June 2022 against Azerbaijan and Kazakhstan)	8 June 2022 – 13 June 2022	2	1	0	1	2	2	0	1.50
(Italy) Francesco Calzona	30 August 2022 – 21 April 2026	27	12	7	8	38	24	+14	1.60
(Slovakia) Vladimír Weiss	12 May 2026 –	0	0	0	0	0	0	0	0
Total		337	135	84	118	469	394	+75	1.45

== Players ==
=== Current squad ===
The following players were called up for the 2026–27 UEFA Nations League C matches against Faroe Islands on 13 November and Kazakhstan on 16 November 2026.

Caps and goals updated as of 16 November 2026, after the match against Kazakhstan.

No.	Pos.	Player	Date of birth (age)	Caps	Goals	Club
12	GK	Marek Rodák	13 December 1996 (age 29)	27	0	(Saudi Arabian Football Federation) Al-Ettifaq
	GK	Dominik Greif	6 April 1997 (age 29)	9	0	(French Football Federation) Lyon
1	GK	Jakub Surovčík	28 June 2002 (age 24)	1	0	(Football Association of the Czech Republic) Sparta Prague
22	GK	Dominik Takáč	12 January 1999 (age 27)	1	0	(Slovak Football Association) Slovan Bratislava
	DF	Milan Škriniar	11 February 1995 (age 31)	92	3	(Turkish Football Federation) Fenerbahçe
	DF	Dávid Hancko	13 December 1997 (age 28)	64	9	(Royal Spanish Football Federation) Atlético Madrid
5	DF	Ľubomír Šatka	2 December 1995 (age 30)	44	1	(Cyprus Football Association) Omonia
	DF	Adam Obert	23 August 2002 (age 24)	24	1	(Italian Football Federation) Cagliari
	DF	Martin Valjent	11 December 1995 (age 30)	21	1	(Royal Spanish Football Federation) Mallorca
2	DF	Ivan Mesík	1 June 2001 (age 25)	7	0	(The Football Association) Charlton Athletic
3	DF	Dávid Krčík	28 June 1999 (age 27)	3	0	(Football Association of the Czech Republic) FK Pardubice
16	DF	Timotej Hranica	28 May 2005 (age 21)	0	0	(Slovak Football Association) Žilina
4	DF	Tobiáš Pališčák	25 October 2007 (age 19)	1	0	(Football Association of the Czech Republic) Viktoria Plzeň
	MF	Ondrej Duda	5 December 1994 (age 31)	99	17	(Saudi Arabian Football Federation) Al-Ettifaq
	MF	Matúš Bero	6 September 1995 (age 31)	51	1	(Hungarian Football Federation) Ferencvárosi
	MF	Tomáš Suslov	7 June 2002 (age 24)	48	5	(Italian Football Federation) Hellas Verona
	MF	Albert Rusnák	7 July 1994 (age 32)	38	7	(United States Soccer Federation) Seattle Sounders
19	MF	Tomáš Rigo	3 July 2002 (age 24)	17	2	(The Football Association) Stoke City
13	MF	Mário Sauer	15 May 2004 (age 22)	3	0	(German Football Association) 1. FC Kaiserslautern
20	MF	Artur Gajdoš	20 January 2004 (age 22)	3	0	(Slovak Football Association) Slovan Bratislava
6	MF	Peter Pokorný	8 August 2001 (age 25)	3	0	(Slovak Football Association) Slovan Bratislava
8	MF	Sebastian Nebyla	25 January 2002 (age 24)	1	0	(Football Association of the Czech Republic) Jablonec
22	MF	Ludovit Reis	1 June 2000 (age 26)	2	0	(German Football Association) Werder Bremen
9	FW	Róbert Boženík	18 November 1999 (age 27)	61	9	(The Football Association) Stoke City
17	FW	Lukáš Haraslín	26 May 1996 (age 30)	58	11	(Saudi Arabian Football Federation) Al Fateh
15	FW	David Strelec	4 April 2001 (age 25)	45	11	(The Football Association) Middlesbrough
18	FW	Adrián Kaprálik	10 June 2002 (age 24)	5	1	(German Football Association) Holstein Kiel
11	FW	Tomáš Bobček	8 September 2001 (age 25)	4	1	(Italian Football Federation) Frosinone
14	FW	Erik Prekop	8 October 1997 (age 29)	5	1	(Polish Football Association) Górnik Zabrze
7	FW	Nino Marcelli	29 May 2005 (age 21)	2	0	(Slovak Football Association) Slovan Bratislava
21	FW	Matej Trusa	29 November 2000 (age 25)	0	0	(Slovak Football Association) DAC 1904

=== Recent call-ups ===
The following players have also been called up to the Slovakia squad within the last twelve months:

Pos.	Player	Date of birth (age)	Caps	Goals	Club	Latest call-up
GK	Martin Dúbravka	15 January 1989 (age 37)	60	0	(England) Tottenham Hotspur	v. Moldova, 6 October 2026
GK	Ľubomír Belko	4 February 2002 (age 24)	0	0	(Norway) Viking	v. Montenegro, 5 June 2026
DF	Denis Vavro	10 April 1996 (age 30)	34	2	(Czech Republic) Viktoria Plzeň	v. Moldova, 6 October 2026
DF	Hugo Pavek	2 June 2005 (age 21)	2	0	(Slovakia) Trenčín	v. Moldova, 6 October 2026
DF	Peter Pekarík (vice-captain)	30 October 1986 (age 40)	138	2	(Germany) Hertha BSC II	v. Montenegro, 5 June 2026^{RET}
DF	Peter Kováčik	1 December 2001 (age 24)	1	0	(Slovakia) Železiarne Podbrezová	v. Montenegro, 5 June 2026
DF	Krisztián Bari	6 February 2001 (age 25)	1	0	(Slovakia) Žilina	v. Montenegro, 5 June 2026
DF	Norbert Gyömbér	3 July 1992 (age 34)	55	0	(Greece) Levadiakos	v. Romania, 31 March 2026
MF	Stanislav Lobotka	25 November 1994 (age 31)	74	4	(Italy) Napoli	v. Moldova, 6 October 2026
MF	László Bénes	9 September 1997 (age 29)	41	2	(Belgium) Gent	v. Montenegro, 5 June 2026
MF	Patrik Hrošovský	22 April 1992 (age 34)	62	0	(Czech Republic) Viktoria Plzeň	v. Romania, 31 March 2026^{RET}
FW	Ivan Schranz	13 September 1993 (age 33)	36	7	(Czech Republic) Slavia Prague	v. Moldova, 6 October 2026
FW	Dávid Ďuriš	22 March 1999 (age 27)	26	2	(Norway) Rosenborg	v. Moldova, 6 October 2026
FW	Leo Sauer	16 December 2005 (age 20)	12	0	(Germany) VfB Stuttgart	v. Moldova, 6 October 2026
FW	Michal Faško	24 August 1994 (age 32)	2	0	(Slovakia) Žilina	v. Moldova, 6 October 2026
FW	Roland Galčík	13 July 2001 (age 25)	1	1	(Slovakia) Železiarne Podbrezová	v. Montenegro, 5 June 2026
FW	Roman Čerepkai	6 April 2002 (age 24)	0	0	(Slovakia) Košice	v. Montenegro, 5 June 2026
FW	Ľubomír Tupta	27 March 1998 (age 28)	21	0	(Azerbaijan) Neftçi Baku	v. Romania, 31 March 2026
FW	Samuel Mráz	13 May 1997 (age 29)	11	1	(Switzerland) Servette	v. Romania, 31 March 2026
Notes: ^{PRE} Preliminary squad; ^{INJ} Withdrew/Unavailable due to an injury or an illness.; ^{RET} Retired or resigned from international football

== Player records ==
As of 13 November 2026
Players in bold are still active with Slovakia.

=== Most appearances ===
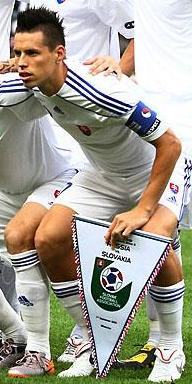
Marek Hamšík is Slovakia's top goalscorer and most capped footballer.

Rank	Player	Caps	Goals	Career
1	Marek Hamšík	138	26	2007–2023
1	Peter Pekarík	138	2	2006–2026
3	Juraj Kucka	112	14	2008–2025
4	Miroslav Karhan	107	14	1995–2011
5	Martin Škrtel	104	6	2004–2019
6	**Ondrej Duda**	99	17	2014–present
7	**Milan Škriniar**	92	3	2016–present
8	Ján Ďurica	91	4	2004–2017
9	Róbert Vittek	82	23	2001–2016
10	Róbert Mak	81	16	2013–2024

=== Top goalscorers ===
Rank	Player	Goals	Caps	Ratio	Career
1	Marek Hamšík	26	138	0.19	2007–2023
2	Róbert Vittek	23	82	0.28	2001–2016
3	Szilárd Németh	22	59	0.37	1996–2006
4	**Ondrej Duda**	17	99	0.17	2014–present
5	Róbert Mak	16	81	0.2	2013–2024
6	Marek Mintál	14	45	0.31	2002–2009
6	Miroslav Karhan	14	107	0.13	1995–2011
6	Juraj Kucka	14	112	0.13	2008–2025
9	Adam Nemec	13	43	0.3	2006–2019
9	Stanislav Šesták	13	66	0.2	2004–2016

== Competitive record ==
=== FIFA World Cup ===
FIFA World Cup record										Qualification record						
Year	Result	Position	Pld	W	D	L	GF	GA	Squad	Pld	W	D	L	GF	GA	—
as Czechoslovakia										as Czechoslovakia						
(Uruguay) 1930	Did not enter									Declined invitation						
(Italy) 1934	Runners-up	2nd	4	3	0	1	9	6	Squad	2	2	0	0	4	1	1934
(France) 1938	Quarter-finals	5th	3	1	1	1	5	3	Squad	2	1	1	0	7	1	1938
(Brazil) 1950	Did not enter									Did not enter						
(Switzerland) 1954	Group stage	14th	2	0	0	2	0	7	Squad	4	3	1	0	5	1	1954
(Sweden) 1958	Group stage	9th	4	1	1	2	9	6	Squad	4	3	0	1	9	3	1958
(Chile) 1962	Runners-up	2nd	6	3	1	2	7	7	Squad	5	4	0	1	20	7	1962
(England) 1966	Did not qualify									6	3	1	2	12	4	1966
(Mexico) 1970	Group stage	15th	3	0	0	3	2	7	Squad	7	5	1	1	16	7	1970
(West Germany) 1974	Did not qualify									4	2	1	1	9	3	1974
(Argentina) 1978	Did not qualify									4	2	0	2	4	6	1978
(Spain) 1982	Group stage	19th	3	0	2	1	2	4	Squad	8	4	2	2	15	6	1982
(Mexico) 1986	Did not qualify									8	3	2	3	11	12	1986
(Italy) 1990	Quarter-finals	6th	5	3	0	2	10	5	Squad	8	5	2	1	13	3	1990
(United States) 1994	Did not qualify									10	4	5	1	21	9	1994
as Slovakia										as Slovakia						
(France) 1998	Did not qualify									4th	10	5	1	4	18	14
(South Korea) (Japan) 2002	Did not qualify									3rd	10	5	2	3	16	9
(Germany) 2006	Did not qualify									2nd	14	6	6	2	26	14
(South Africa) 2010	Round of 16	16th	4	1	1	2	5	7	Squad	1st	10	7	1	2	22	10
(Brazil) 2014	Did not qualify									3rd	10	3	4	3	11	10
(Russia) 2018	Did not qualify									2nd	10	6	0	4	17	7
(Qatar) 2022	Did not qualify									3rd	10	3	5	2	17	10
(Canada) (Mexico) (United States) 2026	Did not qualify									2nd	7	4	0	3	9	12
(Morocco) (Portugal) (Spain) 2030	To be determined									To be determined						
(Saudi Arabia) 2034	To be determined									To be determined						
Total	Runners-up	9/22	34	12	6	16	49	52	—	—	153	80	35	38	282	149

List of FIFA World Cup matches
Year	Round	Opponent	Result	Slovakia goalscorers
2010	Group stage	New Zealand	1–1	Vittek
2010	Group stage	Paraguay	0–2	—
2010	Group stage	Italy	3–2	Vittek (2), Kopúnek
2010	Round of 16	Netherlands	1–2	Vittek

=== UEFA European Championship ===
UEFA European Championship record										Qualifying record						
Year	Result	Position	Pld	W	D	L	GF	GA	Squad	Pld	W	D	L	GF	GA	
as Czechoslovakia										as Czechoslovakia						
(France) 1960	Third place	3rd	2	1	0	1	2	3	Squad	6	4	1	1	16	5	1960
(Spain) 1964	Did not qualify									2	0	1	1	2	3	1964
(Italy) 1968	Did not qualify									6	3	1	2	8	4	1968
(Belgium) 1972	Did not qualify									6	4	1	1	11	4	1972
(Socialist Federal Republic of Yugoslavia) 1976	Champions	1st	2	1	1	0	5	3	Squad	8	5	2	1	19	7	1976
(Italy) 1980	Third place	3rd	4	1	2	1	5	4	Squad	6	5	0	1	17	4	1980
(France) 1984	Did not qualify									8	3	4	1	15	7	1984
(West Germany) 1988	Did not qualify									6	2	3	1	7	5	1988
(Sweden) 1992	Did not qualify									8	5	0	3	12	9	1992
as Slovakia										as Slovakia						
(England) 1996	Did not qualify									3rd	10	4	2	4	14	18
(Belgium) (Netherlands) 2000	Did not qualify									3rd	10	5	2	3	12	9
(Portugal) 2004	Did not qualify									3rd	8	3	1	4	11	9
(Austria) (Switzerland) 2008	Did not qualify									4th	12	5	1	6	33	23
(Poland) (Ukraine) 2012	Did not qualify									4th	10	4	3	3	7	10
(France) 2016	Round of 16	14th	4	1	1	2	3	6	Squad	2nd	10	7	1	2	17	8
(Europe) 2020	Group stage	18th	3	1	0	2	2	7	Squad	3rd	10	5	2	3	15	12
(Germany) 2024	Round of 16	12th	4	1	1	2	4	5	Squad	2nd	10	7	1	2	17	8
(England) (Scotland) (Republic of Ireland) (Wales) 2028	To be determined									To be determined						
(Italy) (Turkey) 2032	To be determined									To be determined						
Total	1 Title	6/17	19	6	5	8	21	28	—	—	136	71	26	39	233	145

List of UEFA European Championship matches
Year	Round	Opponent	Result	Slovakia goalscorers
2016	Group stage	Wales	1–2	Duda
2016	Group stage	Russia	2–1	Weiss, Hamšík
2016	Group stage	England	0–0	—
2016	Round of 16	Germany	0–3	—
2020	Group stage	Poland	2–1	Szczęsny (o.g.), Škriniar
2020	Group stage	Sweden	0–1	—
2020	Group stage	Spain	0–5	—
2024	Group stage	Belgium	1–0	Schranz
2024	Group stage	Ukraine	1–2	Schranz
2024	Group stage	Romania	1–1	Duda
2024	Round of 16	England	1–2 (a.e.t.)	Schranz

=== UEFA Nations League ===
UEFA Nations League record
Season	Division	Group	Pld	W	D	L	GF	GA	P/R	Rank
2018–19	B	1	4	1	0	3	5	5	Same position	21st
2020–21	B	2	6	1	1	4	5	10	▼	30th
2022–23	C	3	6	2	1	3	5	6	Same position	43rd
2024–25	C	1	8	4	2	2	10	6	Same position	37th
2026–27	C	3	6	3	3	0	13	6	▲	36th
Total			30	11	7	12	38	33	21st	

== Head-to-head record ==
The following table shows Slovakia's all-time international record, correct as of 6 October 2026 after the game against Moldova.
Records with defunct teams are marked in italics.

Positive Record Neutral Record Negative Record

Opponents	Pld	W	D	L	GF	GA	GD
Algeria	1	0	1	0	1	1	0
Andorra	2	2	0	0	2	0	+2
Argentina	1	0	0	1	0	6	−6
Armenia	2	0	0	2	1	7	−6
Australia	1	0	1	0	0	0	0
Austria	6	1	3	2	3	6	−3
Azerbaijan	12	10	0	2	26	8	+18
Bahrain	1	0	0	1	0	2	−2
Belarus	5	3	1	1	9	3	+6
Belgium	4	1	2	1	4	4	0
Bolivia	3	2	0	1	3	2	+1
Bosnia and Herzegovina	6	3	0	3	8	7	+1
Brazil	1	0	0	1	0	5	−5
Bulgaria	8	4	2	2	11	6	+5
Cameroon	1	0	1	0	1	1	0
Chile	3	1	1	1	3	2	+1
China	1	1	0	0	3	2	+1
Colombia	3	0	1	2	0	2	−2
Costa Rica	3	1	1	1	5	6	−1
Croatia	17	2	4	11	20	43	−23
Cyprus	6	4	1	1	16	6	+10
Czech Republic	14	3	2	9	12	29	−17
Denmark	3	2	0	1	7	3	+4
Egypt	1	0	0	1	0	1	−1
England	7	0	1	6	4	13	−9
Estonia	4	4	0	0	5	1	+4
Faroe Islands	3	2	1	0	6	2	+4
Finland	4	3	1	0	6	1	+5
France	4	1	1	2	2	6	−4
Georgia	2	1	0	1	3	3	0
Germany	13	4	0	9	14	31	−17
Gibraltar	1	0	1	0	0	0	0
Greece	6	1	1	4	5	10	−5
Guatemala	1	1	0	0	1	0	+1
Hungary	6	4	2	0	7	2	+5
Iceland	7	5	1	1	16	9	+7
Iran	2	1	0	1	6	6	0
Republic of Ireland	6	0	5	1	5	6	−1
Israel	7	3	2	2	10	8	+2
Italy	2	1	0	1	3	5	−2
Japan	3	0	1	2	2	5	−3
Jordan	1	1	0	0	5	1	+4
Kazakhstan	3	1	0	2	3	4	−1
Kosovo	1	0	0	1	3	4	−1
Kuwait	1	1	0	0	2	0	+2
Latvia	6	3	3	0	12	6	+6
Lebanon	1	0	0	1	1	2	−1
Liechtenstein	11	9	2	0	30	1	+29
Lithuania	6	3	3	0	11	5	+6
Luxembourg	9	7	1	1	19	5	+14
Malaysia	1	1	0	0	2	0	+2
Malta	11	9	2	0	31	6	+25
Mexico	1	0	0	1	2	5	−3
Moldova	5	4	0	1	11	4	+7
Montenegro	3	1	2	0	6	4	+2
Morocco	2	0	0	2	2	4	−2
Netherlands	3	0	1	2	2	5	−3
New Zealand	1	0	1	0	1	1	0
Northern Ireland	7	4	1	2	7	5	+2
North Macedonia	8	6	2	0	16	3	+13
Norway	5	1	1	3	2	6	−4
Paraguay	2	0	1	1	1	3	−2
Peru	2	0	0	2	1	3	−2
Poland	9	5	1	3	14	14	0
Portugal	6	0	1	5	3	11	−8
Romania	13	2	6	5	15	21	−6
Russia	11	4	3	4	10	10	0
San Marino	5	5	0	0	26	1	+25
Saudi Arabia	1	0	1	0	1	1	0
Scotland	4	2	0	2	4	2	+2
Serbia and Montenegro (Note: Includes matches against FR Yugoslavia.)	3	0	1	3	1	5	−4
Slovenia	11	2	5	4	8	10	−2
South Korea	1	0	1	0	0	0	0
Spain	7	1	1	5	6	20	−14
Sweden	9	0	4	5	5	16	−11
Switzerland	3	2	0	1	4	4	0
Thailand	2	1	1	0	4	3	+1
Turkey	6	1	1	4	3	8	−5
Uganda	1	0	0	1	1	3	−2
Ukraine	9	2	3	4	11	11	0
United Arab Emirates	3	3	0	0	5	2	+3
United States	1	1	0	0	1	0	+1
Uzbekistan	1	1	0	0	4	1	+3
Wales	6	2	1	3	13	10	+3
Total	345	156	88	141	539	490	+45

== Honours ==
=== Global ===
- FIFA World Cup
  - (silver) Runners-up (2): 1934^{1}, 1962^{1}
- Olympic Games
  - (gold) Gold medal (1): 1980^{1}
  - (silver) Silver medal (1): 1964^{1}

=== Continental ===
- UEFA European Championship (Note: Both the Czech Republic and Slovakia inherited Czechoslovakia's 1976 title.)
  - (gold) Champions (1): 1976^{1}
  - (bronze) Third place (2): 1960^{1}, 1980^{1}

=== Regional ===
- Central European International Cup
  - Champions (1): 1955–60^{1}
  - Runners-up (2): 1927–30^{1}, 1948–53^{1}

=== Friendly ===
- Inter-Allied Games
  - Gold medal (1): 1919^{1}
- Kirin Cup
  - Champions (1): 2000
  - Third place (2): 2002, 2004
- King's Cup
  - Champions (2): 2004, 2018
- Shanghai International Football Tournament
  - Runners-up (1): 1992
- Copa Ciudad de Valparaíso
  - Runners-up (1): 2000
- Cyprus International Football Tournaments
  - Third place (2): 1998, 2003
- Friendship Tournament (UAE)
  - Third place (1): 1994

=== Awards ===
- Slovak Sportsperson of the Year – Team Award: 2009, 2010, 2014, 2015, 2020

=== Summary ===
Competition	1st place, gold medalist(s)	2nd place, silver medalist(s)	3rd place, bronze medalist(s)	Total
FIFA World Cup	0	2	0	2
Olympic Games	1	1	0	2
UEFA European Championship	1	0	2	3
Total	2	3	2	7

Notes

1. Honours won as Czechoslovakia.

== See also ==
- Slovakia national under-21 football team
- Slovakia national under-19 football team
- Slovakia national under-18 football team
- Slovakia national under-17 football team
- Slovakia national under-16 football team
