= Otto Lietchen =

American politician

Otto L. Lietchen (October 5, 1887 – April 1977) was an American Democratic politician who served in the Missouri General Assembly. He served in the Missouri Senate from 1941 until 1949.

Lietchen was educated in public schools and business college and worked as an insurance businessman. He was also a member of the Board of Aldermen of the City of St. Louis for seven and a half years.
