= Michiei Oto =

Japanese molecular biologist

Michiei Oto is a molecular biologist and an expert on the application of biotechnology to genetic testing. He was the first to propose gene literacy education.

Oto was born in Japan. He received a bachelor's degree in biochemistry from Chiba University in 1980 and a Ph.D. from the School of Medicine at Tokyo Medical and Dental University. He is the department director of biotechnology at Tokyo Technical College and a visiting Lecturer at Tokyo University of Agriculture and Technology, Maebashi Institute of Technology and Kogakuin University.
