= Auður =

Auður (Modern Icelandic spelling) or Auðr (Old Icelandic spelling) is an Old Norse-Icelandic female personal name. It also has the variant forms Unnr (Old Icelandic) and Unnur (Modern Icelandic). It is sometimes rendered as Aud, Audr, or Unn in English and in other languages.

== People and characters from medieval sources ==
- Auðr (mythology), the son of Nótt and Naglfari in Snorra Edda
- Auðr in djúpauðga Ívarsdóttir, settler of Iceland
- Auðr in djúpauðga Ketilsdóttir (834-900 AD), the wife of Olaf the White of Dublin, "King" of Ireland

== Post-medieval Icelandic women ==
- Auður Auðuns (1911–1999), lawyer and politician
- Auður Jónsdóttir (born 1973), writer
- Auður Laxness (1918–2012), writer and craftsperson
- Auður Ava Ólafsdóttir (born 1958), writer and professor of art history

== See also ==
- Nidingr (band), a band formerly known as Audr
- Unnur, a given name
