= Unni (Norwegian given name) =

Unni is a Norwegian female given name that may refer to

- Unni Anisdahl (born 1947), Norwegian handball player and sports reporter
- Unni Bernhoft (born 1933), Norwegian actress
- Unni Birkrem, Norwegian handball goalkeeper
- Unni Drougge (born 1956), Swedish author and journalist. At an early age she dropped out of high school
- Unni Holmen (born 1952), Norwegian Olympic gymnast
- Unni Kristiansen, Norwegian biathlete
- Unni Larsen (born 1959), Norwegian cyclist
- Unni Lehn (born 1977), Norwegian football midfielder
- Unni Lindell (born 1957), Norwegian writer
- Unni Løvlid (born 1976), Norwegian musician
- Unni Nyhamar Hinkel, Norwegian handball player
- Unni Straume (born 1955), Norwegian film director and screenwriter
- Unni Wilhelmsen (born 1971), Norwegian singer, songwriter and musician

== See also ==
- Unnur
