= Czech Republic–Slovakia ice hockey rivalry =

International sports rivalry

Czech Republic – Slovakia
- vs.
- Other names: Federal derby
- Location: Central Europe
- Teams: Czech Republic & Slovakia
- First meeting: 26 February 1994
- Latest meeting: Czech Republic 3:2 Slovakia; 2026 IIHF World Championship group stage (23.5. 2026)
- Next meeting: 24 May 2027 at 2027 IIHF World Championship

Statistics
- Total meetings: 57
- Most wins: Czech Republic (37)
- All-time series: 37–7–13
- Largest victory: 8–0 for Czech Republic (May 2, 2009)

The Czech Republic–Slovakia ice hockey rivalry is a highly competitive sports rivalry that exists between the national ice hockey teams of the two countries, as well as their respective sets of fans. Games between the two teams, even those that are only friendly matches, are often marked by notable and sometimes controversial incidents. These matches are also called "Federal derby."

== List of matches ==
=== Statistics ===
(as of February 2014)

Matches	Czech Republic wins	Draws	Slovakia wins	Goal difference
57	37	7	13	205:124

=== Games ===
This list contains only Ice Hockey World Championships and Olympic Games encounters.

26 February 1994	Czech Republic	7–1	Slovakia

30 April 1997	Czech Republic	3–1	Slovakia

7 May 1998	Slovakia	0–1	Czech Republic

08 May 1999	Czech Republic	8–2	Slovakia

8 May 2000; 20:30	Czech Republic	6–2 ( 1 - 0, 3 - 2, 2 - 0 )	Slovakia	Yubileyny, Saint Petersburg; Attendance: 3,999

14 May 2000; 18:30	Slovakia	3–5 ( 0 - 3, 1 - 0, 2 - 2 )	Czech Republic	Ice Palace, Saint Petersburg; Attendance: 12,350

10 May 2001; 16:00	Czech Republic	2–0 ( 1 - 0, 1 - 0, 0 - 0 )	Slovakia	Preussag Arena, Hanover; Attendance: 3,681

5 May 2003; 20:00	Slovakia	3–3 (0-1, 2-2, 1-0)	Czech Republic	Attendance: 12,860

10 May 2003; 17:00	Czech Republic	2–4 (1-2, 1-1, 0-1)	Slovakia	Hartwall Areena, Helsinki; Attendance: 13,324

7 May 2005; 20:15	Slovakia	1–5 (0-2, 1-3, 0-0)	Czech Republic	Wiener Stadthalle, Vienna; Attendance: 7,614

Game reference

Rastislav Staňa
Ján Lašák
Goalies
Tomáš Vokoun
Referee:
(Sweden) Thomas Andersson

	0 - 1	1:49 - P. Sýkora (J. Hlaváč, J. Fischer)
	0 - 2	14:24 - S. Straka (V. Prospal, T. Kaberle)
27:23 - M. Štrbák (Ľ. Višňovský, Ž. Pálffy) (PP1)	1 - 2
	1 - 3	30:51 - T. Kaberle (D. Výborný, J. Jágr) (PP1)
	1 - 4	31:31 - A. Hemský, Hlaváč, P. Čajánek
	1 - 5	32:23 - P. Kubina (J. Jágr, M. Straka) (PP1)

8 min
Penalties
12 min
29
Shots
28

22 February 2006; 21:35	Slovakia	1–3 (0-1, 0-1, 1-1)	Czech Republic	Palasport Olimpico; Attendance: 6,893

Game reference

Peter Budaj
Goalies
Milan Hnilička
Referee:
(Canada) Don Van Massenhoven

	0 - 1	12:51 - M. Ručínský (SH)
	0 - 2	28:41 - M. Hejduk (F. Kaberle, M. Ručínský)
M. Gáborík (Mari. Hossa) - 43:38	1 - 2
	1 - 3	59:57 - M. Straka (EN)

8 min
Penalties
14 min
21
Shots
28

5 May 2007; 20:15 (MSD)	Czech Republic	2–3 ( 1 - 0, 0 - 2, 1 - 1 )	Slovakia	Mytishchi Arena, Mytishchi; Attendance: 3,400

Game reference
T. Plekanec 08:02 (PP); R. Klesla 54:03 (ES) / Goals / 22:24 (ES) P. Demitra; 30:44 (ES) R. Kapuš; 53:18 (ES) M. Gáborík

2 May 2009; 16:15	Czech Republic	8–0 ( 4–0, 4–0, 0–0)	Slovakia	Schluefweg, Kloten; Attendance: 5,165

Game reference
	Referees: (Switzerland) Brent Reiber (United States) Thomas Sterns
J. Jágr 06:35; J. Jágr 09:08; M. Blaťák (PP2) 12:48; R. Červenka 15:25; A. Kotalík 25:07; R. Červenka 29:08; M. Michálek 30:12; P. Eliáš 38:14 / Goals	Referees: (Switzerland) Brent Reiber (United States) Thomas Sterns

17 February 2010; 21:00	Czech Republic	3–1 (1–0, 2–1, 0–0)	Slovakia	Canada Hockey Place, Vancouver; Attendance: 16,924

Game reference

Tomáš Vokoun
Goalies
Jaroslav Halák
Referees:
(Switzerland) Brent Reiber
(Canada) Brad Watson

P. Eliáš (M. Havlát, M. Blaťák) - 09:02	1 – 0
	1 – 1	20:47 - M. Gáborík (Mari. Hossa, P. Demitra)
J. Jágr (R. Červenka) - 37:56	2 – 1
T. Plekanec (J. Jágr, M. Židlický) - 39:58	3 – 1

8 min
Penalties
12 min
24
Shots
35

6 May 2011; 20:15	Czech Republic	3–2 (1–0, 0–1, 2–1)	Slovakia	Orange Arena, Bratislava; Attendance: 9,313

Game reference

Ondřej Pavelec
Goalies
Jaroslav Halák
Referees:
(Canada) Darcy Burchell
(Switzerland) Danny Kurmann

M. Židlický (P. Eliáš, J. Marek) (PP) – 17:48	1–0
	1–1	22:54 – L. Nagy (Ľ Višňovský, J. Stümpel)
M. Havlát (P. Eliáš) – 41:06	2–1
M. Michálek (P. Eliáš, M. Havlát) – 44:28	3–1
	3–2	58:41 – T. Surový (B. Radivojevič, M. Cibák)

6 min
Penalties
4 min
37
Shots
22

19 May 2012; 18:30	Czech Republic	1–3 (0–1, 1–0, 0–2)	Slovakia	Hartwall Areena, Helsinki; Attendance: 12,355

Game reference

Jakub Kovář
Jakub Štěpánek
Goalies
Ján Laco
Referees:
(Germany) Lars Brüggemann
(Finland) Jari Levonen
Linesmen:
(Germany) Sirko Schulz
(Canada) Jesse Wilmot

	0–1	15:52 – M. Šatan (A. Sekera, I. Baranka)
M. Frolík (T. Plekanec) – 30:45	1–1
	1–2	40:56 – M. Šatan (M. Handzuš) (SH)
	1–3	44:23 – L. Hudáček (T. Surový)

0 min
Penalties
6 min
37
Shots
28

18 February 2014; 21:00	Czech Republic	5–3 (3–0, 1–1, 1–2)	Slovakia	Shayba Arena, Sochi; Attendance: 3,628

Game reference

Ondřej Pavelec
Goalies
Ján Laco
Referees:
(Canada) Tim Peel
(Sweden) Marcus Vinnerborg
Linesmen:
(Canada) Lonnie Cameron
(Finland) Sakari Suominen

A. Hemský (T. Kaberle, J. Voráček) (PP) – 06:53	1–0
R. Červenka (J. Jágr, T. Plekanec) – 07:22	2–0
D. Krejčí (T. Kaberle, R. Gudas) (PP) – 17:03	3–0
R. Červenka – 35:41	4–0
	4–1	38:57 – M. Hossa (A. Sekera, M. Handzuš)
	4–2	47:20 – M. Hossa (T. Tatar, M. Handzuš)
	4–3	48:51 – T. Surový (A. Sekera, M. Bartovič)
T. Plekanec (D. Krejčí) (ENG, PP) – 59:21	5–3

2 min
Penalties
10 min
29
Shots
32

9 May 2014; 20:45	Slovakia	2–3 OT (0–1, 2–0, 0–1) (OT 0–1)	Czech Republic	Čyžoŭka-Arena, Minsk; Attendance: 6,920

Game reference

Ján Laco
Goalies
Alexander Salák
Referees:
(Russia) Vyacheslav Bulanov
(Germany) Daniel Piechaczek
Linesmen:
(Belarus) Ivan Dedyulya
(Russia) Stanislav Raming

	0–1	06:24 – O. Němec (J. Hudler, R. Červenka)
M. Miklík (T. Tatar) – 25:17	1–1
M. Viedenský (M. Miklík, M. Réway) – 35:45	2–1
	2–2	57:53 – J. Jágr (O. Němec, T. Hertl)
	2–3	61:50 – J. Klepiš (M. Ševc, O. Vitásek)

10 min
Penalties
10 min
16
Shots
33

5 May 2018; 18:15	Czech Republic	3–2 OT	Slovakia	Royal Arena, Copenhagen; Attendance: 12,490

1 June 2021; 16:15	Czech Republic	7–3	Slovakia	Olympic Sports Centre, Riga

12 May 2023; 16:20	Slovakia	2–3	Czech Republic	Arena Riga, Riga; Attendance: 7,800

23 May 2026; 16:20	Slovakia	2–3	Czech Republic	BCF Arena, Fribourg

== See also ==
- Czechoslovakia national ice hockey team
- Czech Republic national ice hockey team
- Slovakia national ice hockey team
- Czech Republic–Slovakia football rivalry
