= Oto Brunegraf =

Slovak football manager

Personal information
- Full name: Oto Brunegraf
- Date of birth: 7 July 1972 (age 54)
- Place of birth: Nitra, Czechoslovakia

Managerial career
- Years: Team
- 2000–2008: Nitra (assistant)
- 2008–2009: Mladá Boleslav (assistant)
- 2009–2011: Žilina (assistant)
- 2011–2013: Zagłębie Lubin (assistant)
- 2014: Senica (assistant)
- 2015–2018: Slovakia U21 (assistant)
- 2018: Slovakia U21
- 2018: Sparta Prague (assistant)
- 2018–2020: Slovakia (assistant)
- 2020: Slovakia (caretaker)

Oto Brunegraf (born 7 July 1972) is a Slovak football manager. His last spell was with the Slovak national team as an assistant to Pavel Hapal with whom he also served on club level in Slovakia, Czech Republic and Poland. He managed the side for one match on caretaker basis in a 2–3 defeat versus Israel.
