= Woodstock Mural =

Mural in Portland, Oregon

- Reproduced mural, 2016
- Artist: Mike Lawrence
- Year: 2013 (original); 2015 (reproduction)
- Type: Mural
- Medium: Paint
- Location: Portland, Oregon, United States; 45.478976°N 122.616357°W

Woodstock Mural is a mural designed by artist Mike Lawrence, painted on the west side of the New Seasons Market store in the Woodstock neighborhood of Portland, Oregon, in the United States. The painting has three sections, each representing a theme: commerce, education, and the outdoors. It depicts figures adorned with symbolism related to characters in Greek mythology, including Hermes, Athena, and Demeter, along with local businesses and local landmarks such as the neighborhood farmers' market, Grand Central Bakery, Portland Fish Market, Woodstock Park, and the Woodstock Library.

The Woodstock Neighborhood Association (WNA) originally made plans for a mural on the exterior wall of Lutz Tavern. Following an outreach effort to identify an artist, Lawrence and WNA met for a brainstorming session, during which they agreed on themes for the proposed public artwork. Even after some funding was secured, efforts stalled. The association later proposed a mural for the nearby Red Fox Vintage building.

The original mural was completed on the Red Fox Vintage building by Heidi Schultz in November 2013. However, shortly after its completion, New Seasons announced the construction of a new grocery store next to the mural. The company offered to reproduce the painting on the east side of an adjacent building or the west side of the planned building. Dan Cohen and his assistant were hired to reproduce the mural, which was completed in October 2015.

== Description ==
The original mural on the west side of the Red Fox Vintage building in December 2013

Woodstock Mural was designed by artist Mike Lawrence as a work divided into three sections. According to the Regional Arts & Culture Council (RACC), each section includes a central figure adorned with symbolism associated with Greek mythology, representing one of three themes: commerce, education, and the outdoors. The Portland Tribune described the mural as "rich in latent symbolism with more mysterious content", referring to the mythological symbolism in particular. The original painting measured 54 feet (16 m) x 15 feet (4.6 m). In 2015, the mural was reproduced on another wall following construction of an adjacent new building housing a New Seasons Market; the new building hid the original mural. The "imposing" reproduction, as described by The Bee, a community newspaper, measures 52 feet (16 m) x 15 feet (4.6 m).

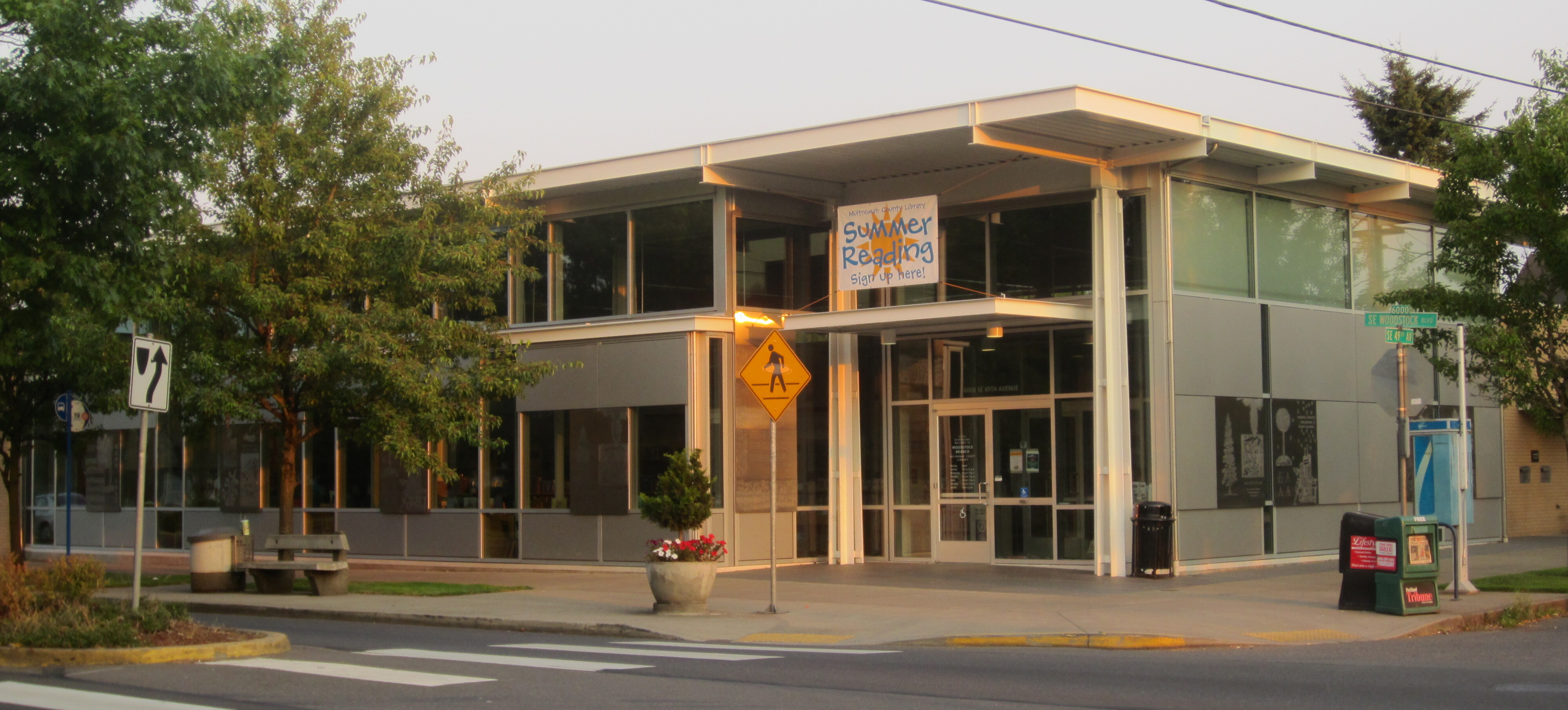
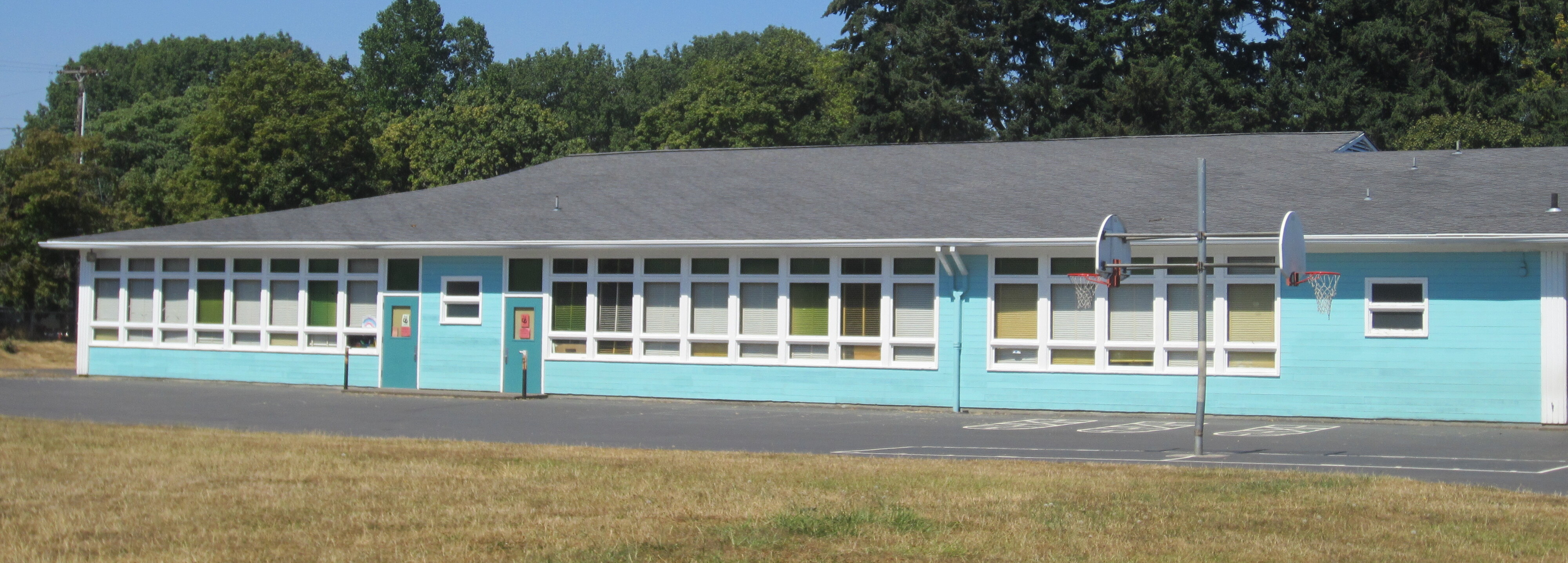
The Woodstock Library (top) and Woodstock School (bottom) are represented in the mural, along with other neighborhood businesses and landmarks.

Commerce, represented on the left side, is depicted by a shopkeeper wearing a hat with the wings of Hermes, the Greek god of commerce (or, according to some sources, Mercury, the Roman god of commerce). The business owner is bearded and wears a crocus flower in his apron. He has a tattoo of the caduceus, the staff carried by Hermes Trismegistus in Egyptian mythology and Hermes in Greek mythology. In his store is a shelf with other symbolic items that represent local businesses.

The center section is devoted to education and depicts Athena, the Greek goddess of wisdom, in the form of a girl in the Woodstock Library. She is adorned with an owl on her shoulder and an olive branch necklace. She holds a tiger lily in her hand. Woodstock School's Mandarin Immersion Program is honored with an arc of Chinese characters above the girl's head, written on a chalkboard. The Mandarin Chinese text translates to "A nice place to live" or "It's a great place to live", which is Woodstock's motto. According to The Bee, the central section also represents other neighborhood schools and the neighborhood's close proximity to Reed College.

The mural's right section depicts Demeter, the Greek goddess of the harvest, in the form of an Asian female urban farmer at the neighborhood farmers' market. She wears poppies in her headdress, giving the appearance of a crown, and has a tattoo of a sheaf of wheat. Next to her is a cornucopia, which symbolizes abundance and nourishment. She holds a lotus staff, described as a "flaming torch". The figure also represents "the love of gardening". Douglas fir trees and Woodstock Park, specifically its off-leash dog area, are also depicted in the painting's right section.

== History ==
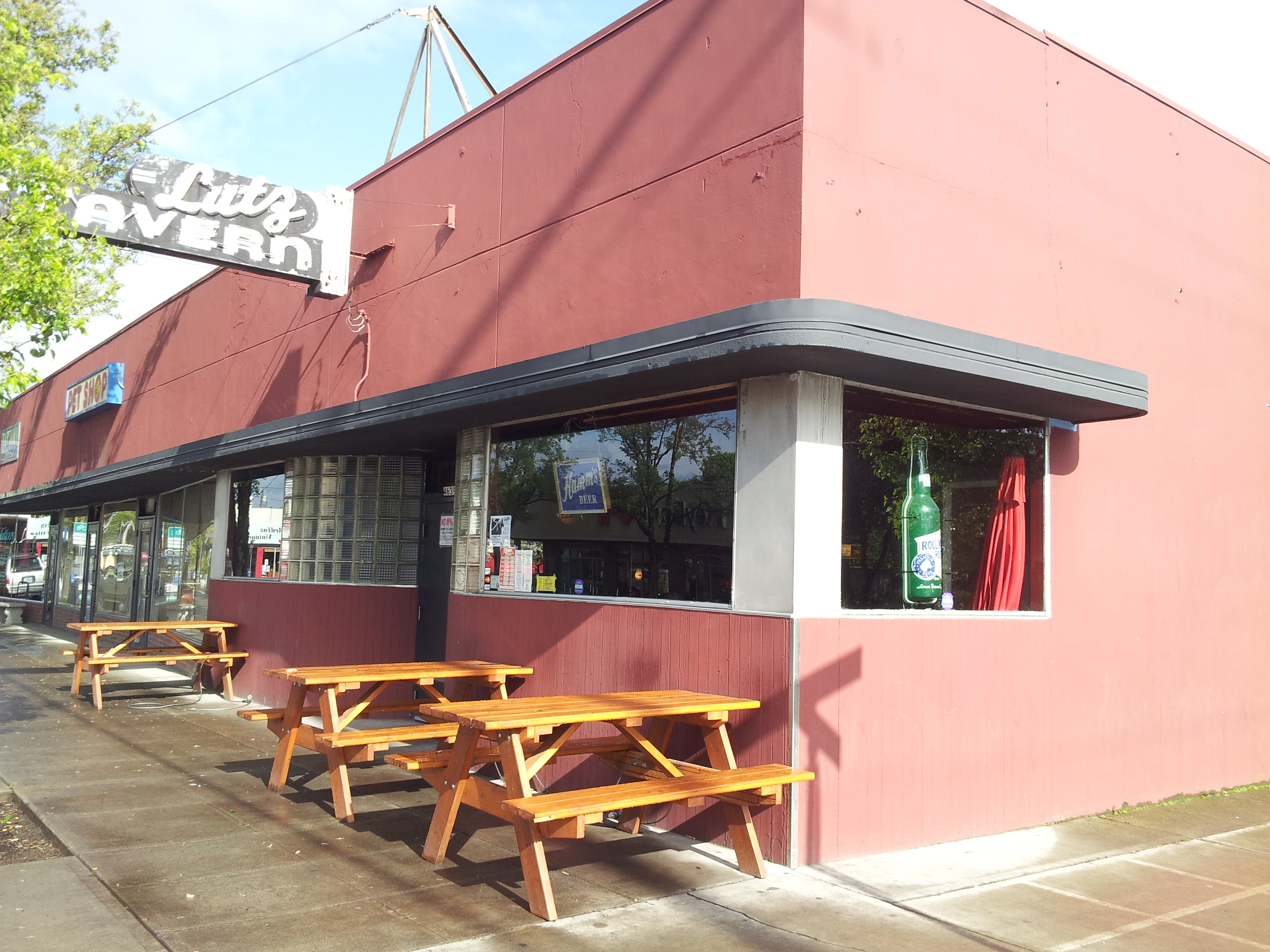
The mural was originally planned for the exterior wall of Lutz Tavern.

The Woodstock Neighborhood Association (WNA) originally made plans to paint a community mural on the east exterior of Lutz Tavern. Following an outreach effort to locate an artist, WNA and Lawrence held a brainstorming session. Kenny Heggem, who served as the project manager of the mural committee, recalled, "We talked about our fantastic park and its leash-free dog area, Woodstock Elementary's Mandarin Immersion Program, and our awesome library." The session resulted in the group's choosing the mural's three themes.

In August 2012, RACC confirmed funding of $6,000 for the 60-foot (18 m) x 15-foot (4.6 m) painting. The mural's design was divided into three parts to accommodate the exterior wall's three sections. RACC published an image of Lawrence's proposed mural and said the goal of the project was to "highlight the best of the neighborhood and instill a sense of community pride". The agency also said the project was still raising funds and hoped to start in the spring of 2013. Efforts stalled, but WNA later proposed a mural with a different design for the east side of the Red Fox Vintage building, located at the intersection of Southeast 46th Avenue and Southeast Woodstock Boulevard.

According to the Portland Tribune, the project was a collaboration between local businesses, institutions, and neighborhood residents. Beaver State Scaffolding and Sherwin-Williams both contributed resources to the project. RACC awarded partial grant funding through its Public Art Murals Program, which is funded by the City of Portland and "provides funding for community murals that reflect diversity in style and media and encourages artists from diverse backgrounds and range of experience to apply". WNA volunteers also assisted, led by Heggem and Becky Luening, head of the neighborhood association.

Heidi Schultz of Schultz Art & Design served as the project's production manager. She created a pattern against the wall using Lawrence's digital design, then mixed the paint, completed the mural, and added a clear coating for protection. Painting the mural took about six weeks, and it was mostly finished by November 2013. Red Fox Vintage hosted a party to celebrate the work's completion on December 14. The mural took nearly two years to plan and complete, which was longer than expected.

=== Reproduction ===
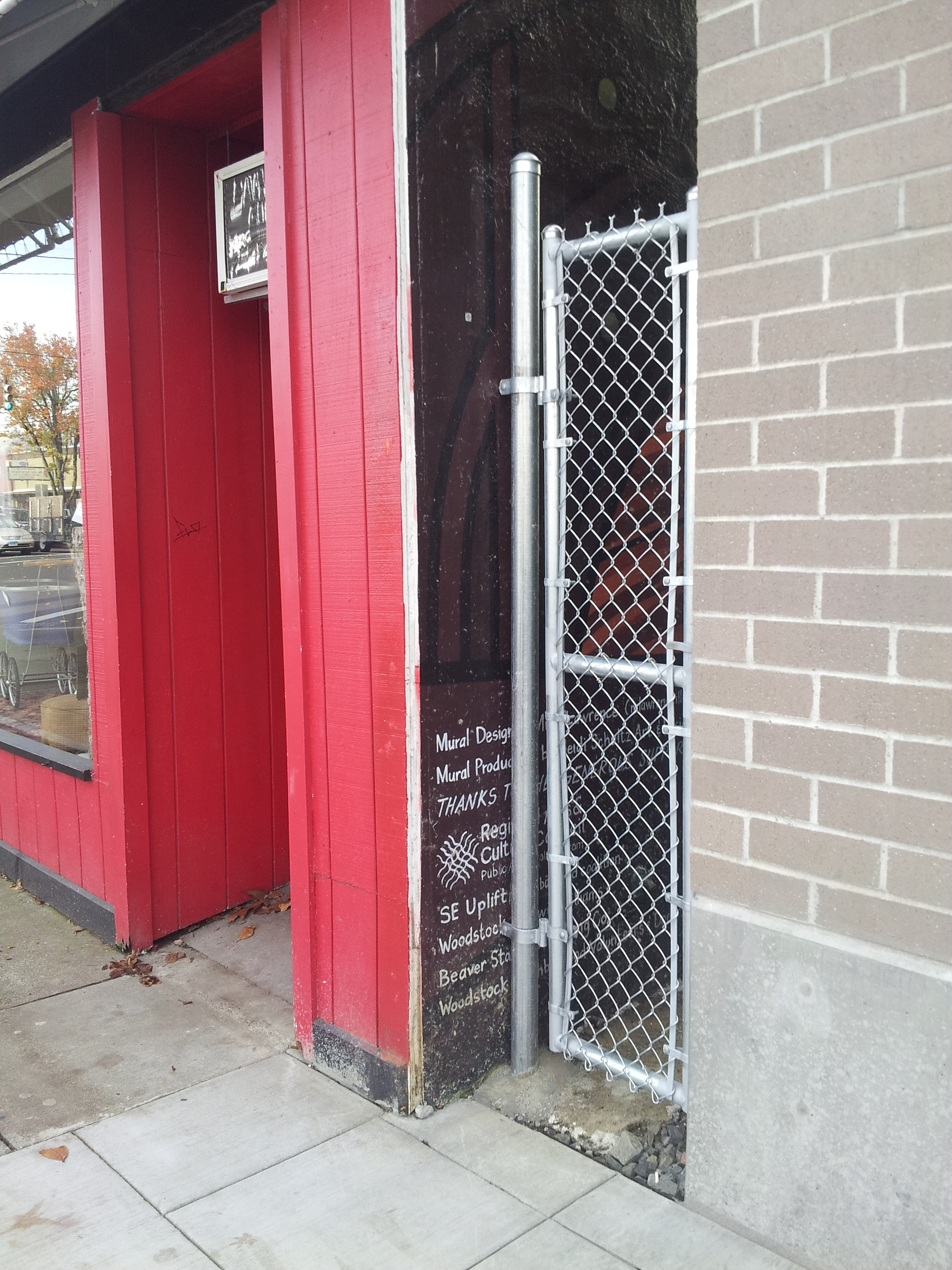
The original mural covered by new construction

Not long after the mural's completion, New Seasons Market announced plans to build a new store immediately adjacent to the mural. In January 2014, the co-owner of Red Fox Vintage, said, "We're going to have a sit-down with New Seasons about the mural. To the best of my knowledge, New Seasons will make it right." She shared three options to discuss with the company: repainting the mural on Red Fox's east wall, transferring it to the new store's exterior wall, or keeping the original mural in place and making it visible from the grocery store's interior.

New Seasons met with WNA and offered to reproduce the painting, either on the east side of the Red Fox Vintage building or the west side of the planned grocery store. Luening said the latter option was more practical, because the artist could paint on panels in her studio instead of working outside. New Seasons hired Dan Cohen of Dan Cohen Creative Labs to duplicate the mural using a method similar to one he uses in his work as a "mega mural" painter. He said of the process:

I paint giant advertising murals all over the country. I do about one mural a month. We create the pattern using the original image, and paint on top of it. We use a special machine [to create the underlying design] that works like an arc welder.

During construction of the new building and the mural's transfer, New Seasons displayed a banner which read, "The mural will return". Cohen and his assistant, Christo Wunderlich, transferred the design using a machine, then painted the art by hand. The duo also added bread and a fish to the mural to represent the local businesses Grand Central Bakery and Portland Fish Market, respectively. The new store opened in 2015.

== See also ==
- 2013 in art
- 2015 in art
- Classical mythology in culture
- Portland Memorial Mausoleum Mural, a 2009 mural by Dan Cohen and Shane Bennett
