= Woodstock Library =

Library branch in Portland, Oregon

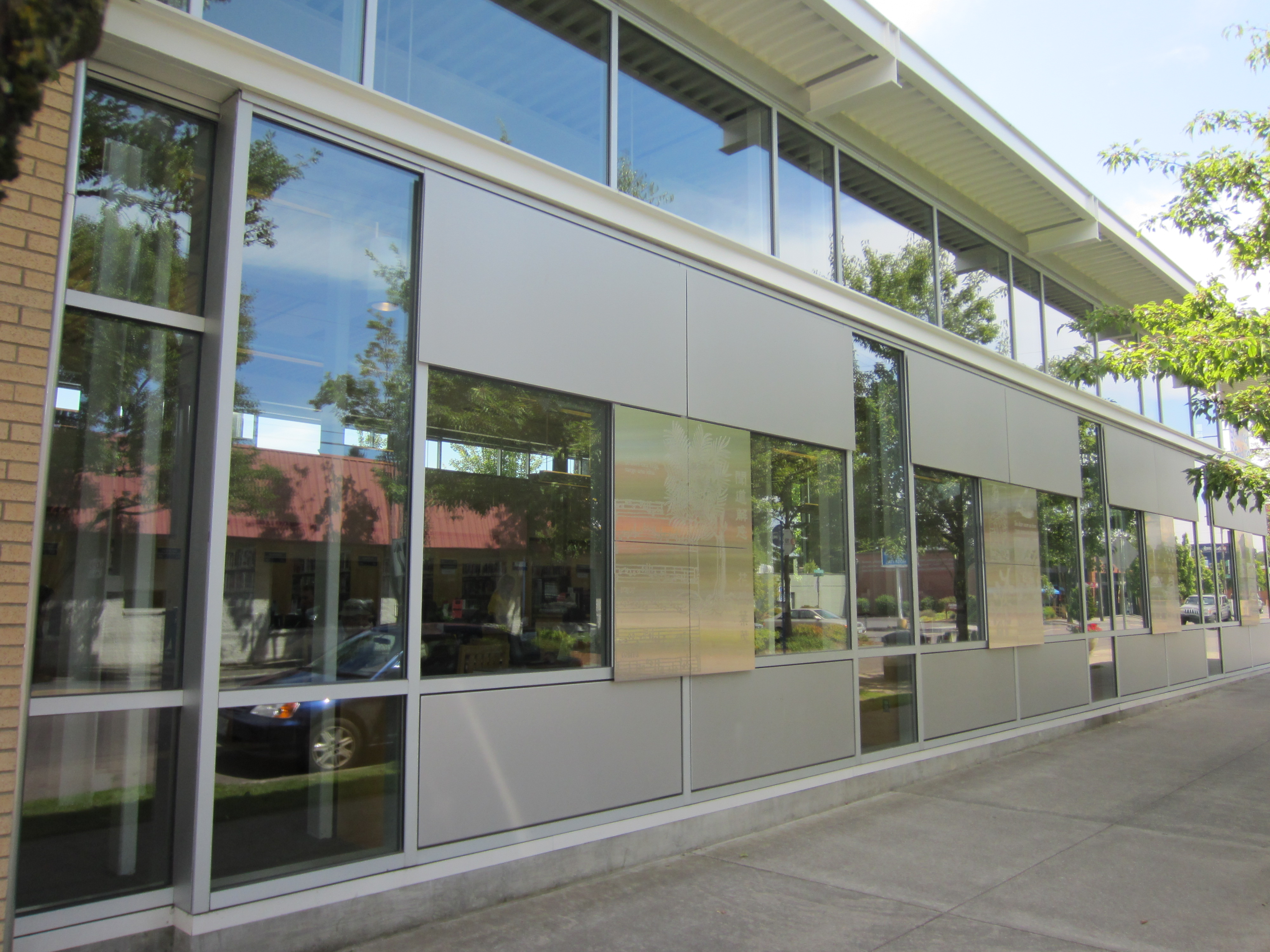
- Woodstock Library in 2012

- Location within Portland, Oregon

General information
- Location: Woodstock, 6008 SE 49th Avenue, Portland, Oregon, United States
- Coordinates: 45.478859°N 122.612093°W
- Opened: March 14, 2000
- Owner: Multnomah County Library

Technical details
- Floor area: 7,500 square feet (700 m^{2})

Design and construction
- Architecture firm: Thomas Hacker Architects
- Structural engineer: Degenkolb Engineers
- Main contractor: McCarthy Building Companies, Inc.

Website
- Woodstock Library

The Woodstock Library is a branch of the Multnomah County Library in southeast Portland, Oregon, United States. The library's origins date back to 1908, when the people of the Woodstock neighborhood established a reading room at the Woodstock Fire Station, which soon became one of fifteen "deposit stations" (packing crates that turned into two-shelf bookcases and could hold up to 50 books each). The Woodstock collection began as an assemblage of children's books and was housed within a public school. In 1911, the station was replaced by a "sub-branch" library offering more books for adults and children, but without the reference works and services available at regular branches. The collection moved into a larger facility in 1914, which became a full branch in 1917, offering additional resources and services.

The library occupied a series of temporary locations during the 1920s–'40s. Construction began on Woodstock's permanent library building in 1959. It was dedicated on June 1 the following year, the fourth community library built by Multnomah County. Until the mid-1990s the library was maintained as-is with only regular maintenance, though capacity strained as public use grew and new technologies demanded additional shelf space. In 1995, the City of Portland's Bureau of Planning released the "Adopted Woodstock Neighborhood Plan", which included a policy to improve the branch and its services. In 1996, the county adopted a $28 million bond measure to renovate some branches and upgrade technology throughout the system. Given multiple issues with the existing building, including structural problems and non-compliance with building codes, Multnomah County Library determined reconstruction was necessary. The library was demolished in January 1999.

The current 7,500-square-foot (700 m^{2}) Woodstock Library building was completed in 2000. It has a "lantern-like" quality and has received multiple awards for its design. In addition to offering the Multnomah County Library catalog, which contains two million books, periodicals and other materials, the library houses collections in Chinese and Spanish and employs Chinese-speaking staff.

== Early history ==
In 1906, the Multnomah County Library began distributing books to neighborhoods outside downtown Portland. A reading room was established in the Woodstock neighborhood's fire station building in 1908; later that year it was recognized as a branch of Multnomah County Library. Deposit stations, containing packing crates that turned into two-shelf bookcases holding up to 50 books each, were often set up within fire stations or private homes. Woodstock received its deposit station, a collection of children's books housed within a public school, in 1909, becoming one of fifteen outlying service areas. On May 16, 1911, the Woodstock deposit station was replaced by a sub-branch library, supplying more reading material for adults and children but without the reference works and other library services offered at regular branches. The collection was moved to a larger storefront facility, west of SE 44th on SE Woodstock Boulevard, on September 12, 1914. The library achieved full branch status in 1917, offering a collection and services comparable to other branches. In 1918, the Woodstock branch and several others were threatened with closure after employees received a $10 per month salary increase, but funding sources helped to defray the additional expense. Along with other county libraries, the branch closed between November 1 and November 16 in response to the 1918 flu pandemic.

During the 1920s–1940s the library occupied a series of temporary locations within rented storefronts. Library resources and services were used heavily by unemployed residents during the Great Depression as well as during and after World War II, as people requested information ranging from foreign locales to victory gardens to jobs. In the 1950s, responding to population changes and the rise in automobile use, Multnomah County Library divided the county into six regions, each of which had a single "Class A" branch offering extended operating hours and full services. Deposit stations and smaller branch libraries were to be eliminated or merged to house larger collections.

== Original building ==
External image
- Woodstock Library by Multnomah County Library at Flickr

Multnomah County Library decided to consolidate the Woodstock and Sellwood-Moreland branches, both of which had struggled to operate in rented spaces for years. Construction of Woodstock's first permanent library building, located at 6008 SE 49th Avenue, began in 1959. The new library, measuring 5,640 square feet (524 m^{2}), was dedicated on June 1 the following year, the fourth community library built by Multnomah County. The president of the Library Association of Portland wrote in the organization's annual report: "Community response to this fine example of an adequate extension agency has been gratifying. This accelerated use fortifies the principle that excellent, strong book collections, strategically placed, provide economical and satisfactory extension [branch] service."

The library received regular maintenance and refurbishment from the 1970s through the mid-1990s, including repairs following a small fire. Capacity became strained as video and audiobook collections demanded additional shelf space and public use continued to grow. In 1995, the City of Portland's Bureau of Planning released the "Adopted Woodstock Neighborhood Plan", which included a policy to enhance the branch. Objectives included promoting its use, upgrading the facility and its services, improving cyclist and pedestrian access, and strengthening its cultural and educational role within the community. In May 1996, Multnomah County voters passed a $28 million bond measure to renovate some branches and upgrade technology throughout the system. Multnomah County Library determined building reconstruction was necessary given multiple issues including electrical, lighting, mechanical, plumbing and structural problems, mold growth within the walls and underneath flooring, and non-compliance with earthquake engineering and Americans with Disabilities Act codes. Cost analysis revealed reconstruction was more effective than repairing the existing structure; additional factors included data and communications upgrades and the need for meeting space. Woodstock Library closed on January 17, 1999 and was demolished soon after. Many of its building materials were recycled or salvaged for reuse.

== Current building ==
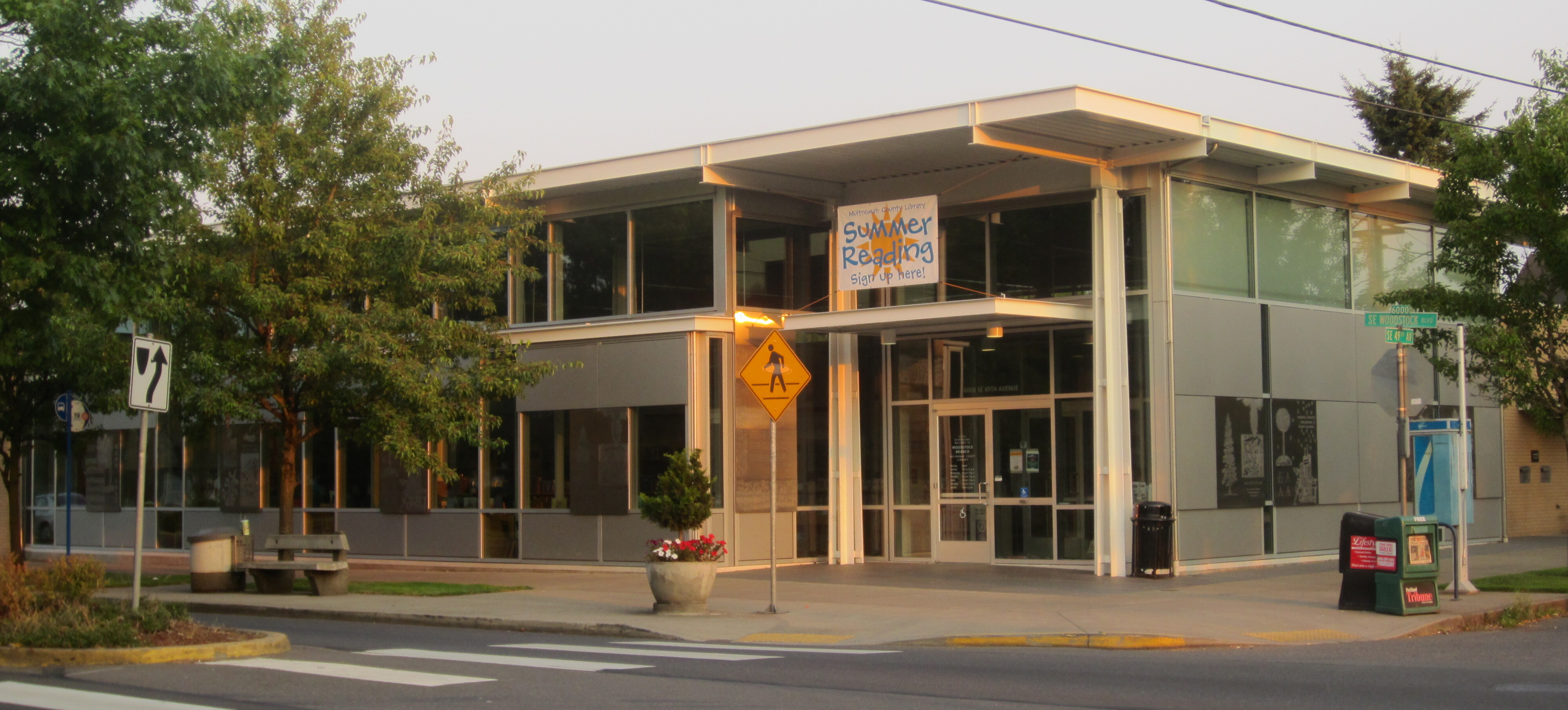
The library's main entrance, 2012

The current Woodstock Library building is at the intersection of one commercial street (SE Woodstock Boulevard) and one tree-lined residential street (SE 49th), which links to the Woodstock School and Woodstock Park. Measuring 7,500 square feet (700 m^{2}), it opened on March 14, 2000, the first branch within the Multnomah County Library system to undergo complete reconstruction. Architects were Folger Johnson and Donald Mayer as well as Thomas Hacker and Associates P.C. (also referred to as Thomas Hacker Architects Inc. or THA Architecture). Becca Cavell served as project architect, project manager and construction administrator. Some of the building's architectural features were designed by the engineering firm Degenkolb Engineers. Contractor services were provided by McCarthy Building Companies, Inc.

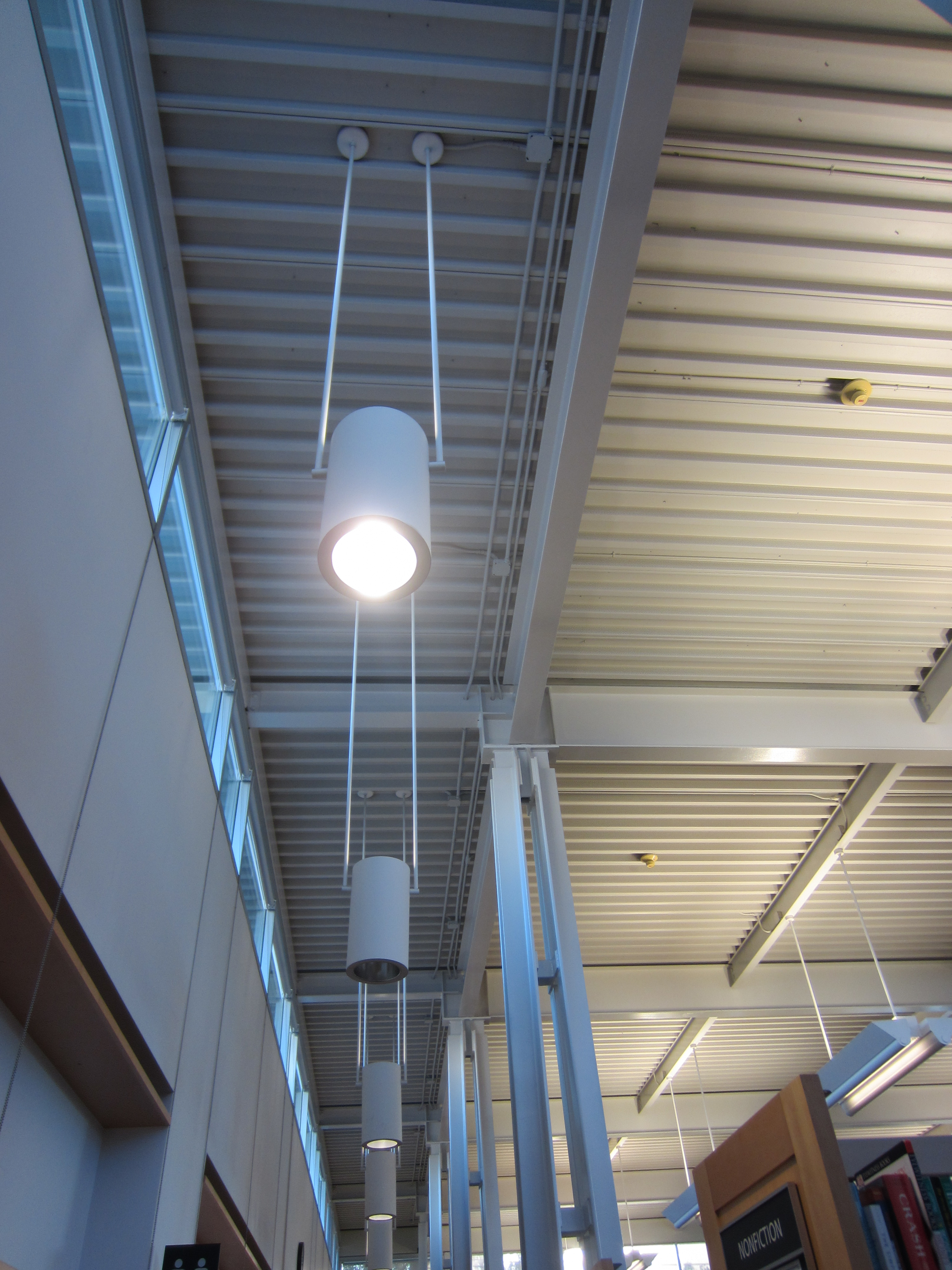
Exposed steel roof supported by steel columns

Designers had in mind a "lantern-like" quality for the library, "open, light and inviting". THA said the goal was to create a "feeling of openness and availability", with a focus on "books and people". Most of the library's collection is housed within a single large room level with the sidewalk outside. The building has an exposed gridded steel roof 19 feet (580 cm) high, supported by six pairs of slender steel columns and lined with windows. From several column options, Degenkolb chose cantilevered columns designed in a cruciform shape, built from four steel angles measuring 6 by 6 inches (15 cm × 15 cm). The columns taper from the top and provide even distribution of loads, protecting the structure against wind and earthquakes without lateral bracing (or the need for supporting walls). The library features a 32-person capacity meeting room for hosting community events at no charge on a first come, first served basis. The building houses original artwork, including a work by Margot Voorhies-Thompson and, at the entrance, a 15-line poem by Kim Stafford titled "Open This Door of All Doors". The exterior includes 36 stainless steel panels etched with words depicting the history of books.

Kari Hauge became the first librarian of the new facility. In addition to offering the Multnomah County Library catalog of two million books, periodicals and other materials, the Woodstock Library houses collections in Chinese and Spanish and employs Chinese-speaking staff. Self-checkout stations and radio frequency identification gates were installed in July 2010.

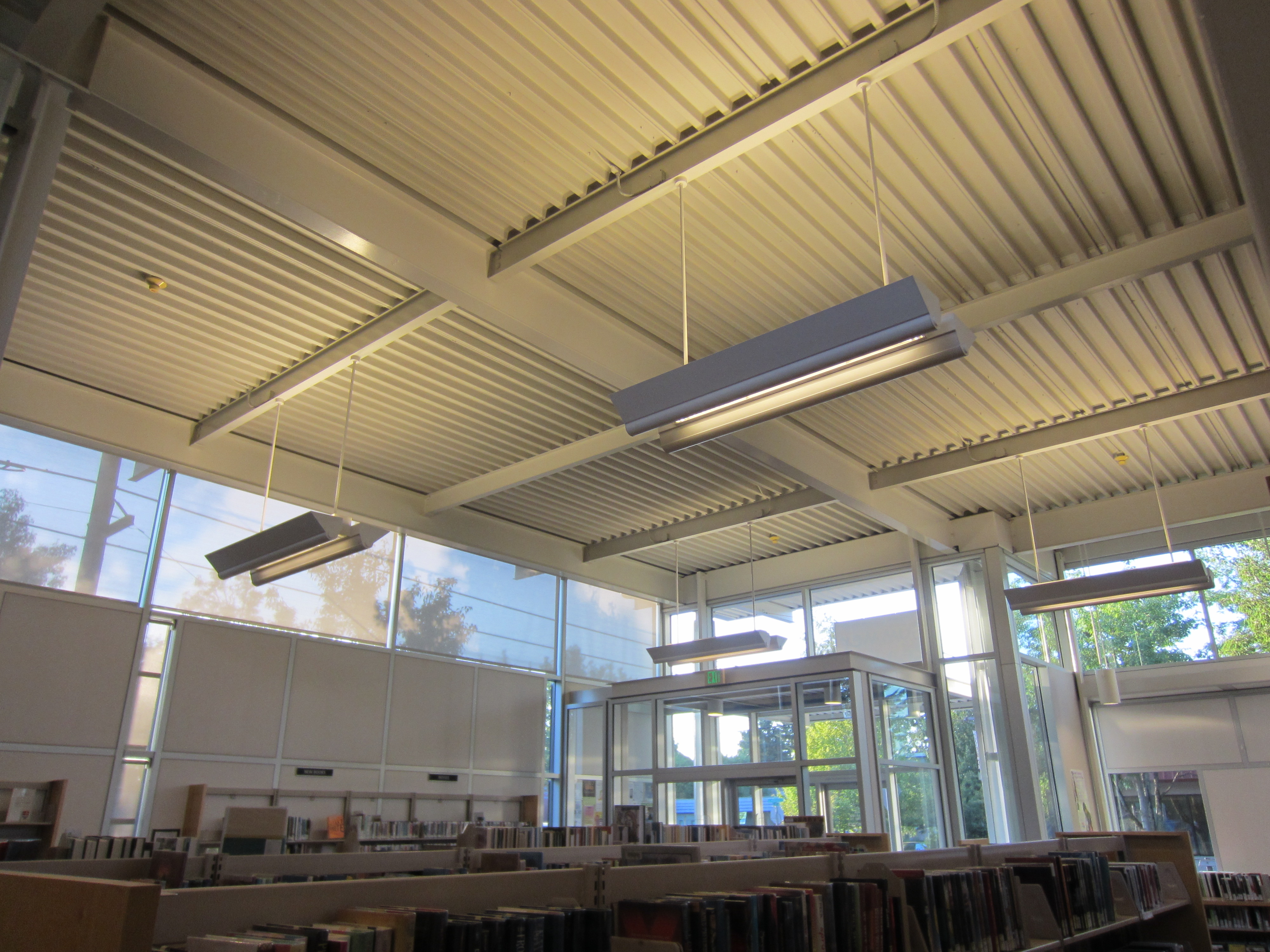
The current library has received several awards for quality design, engineering and lighting.

The current building has received several design awards. In 2000, the American Institute of Steel Construction awarded Degenkolb with the I.D.E.A.S. Merit Award for quality structural engineering. Thomas Hacker Architects was presented with the 2002 AIA Regional Honor Award by the Northwest and Pacific Region of the American Institute of Architects through its Design Awards Program; jurors noted the library's "rigorous but poetic" structure and its "outstanding tectonic harmony, from the smallest scale of details to the basic design concept". The building also received the 2000 AIA Portland Chapter Honor Award, the 2000 Portland General Electric EarthSmart Award, the 2001 AIA American Library Association Award of Excellence (for its "simple and elegant design") and the 2002 Chicago Athenaeum American Architecture Award. The Illuminating Engineering Society of North America presented an award for the library's quality lighting design. Ginnie Cooper, director of libraries for Multnomah County, said of the recognition: "Library users love this building and we're pleased with how much the architectural community has applauded it as well."

The Woodstock Library became a model project for library branch reconstruction in the region. Other libraries designed and built by Thomas Hacker include the Beaverton City Library, the Belmont Library, the Bend Library and the Penrose Library (Whitman College). In 2025, the library closed temporarily for interior renovations funded by a 2020 building bond. The library reopened in September 2025.

== Community role ==
Over the years both Woodstock Library buildings have hosted numerous activities, clubs, events and programs. According to the "Adopted Woodstock Neighborhood Plan", the Woodstock Library and Woodstock Community Center enhance the Village Center's role within the community as a "gathering place". Recent examples include appearances by actors and authors, a clown show, "conversation circles" for non-native English speakers, crafting, cultural celebrations, knitting groups, a mobile zoo, and neighborhood organization meetings and storytelling. The library has also hosted town hall meetings and serves as a ballot drop-off site during elections.
