= Portland Memorial Mausoleum Mural =

Mural in Portland, Oregon, U.S.

- The mural in 2020
- Artist: Dan Cohen; Shane Bennett
- Year: 2009
- Type: Mural
- Medium: Latex paint
- Location: Portland, Oregon, United States; 45.474918°N 122.652359°W

Portland Memorial Mausoleum Mural is a 2009 mural by Dan Cohen of ArtFX Murals and Shane Bennett, painted at Wilhelm's Portland Memorial Funeral Home (also known as the Portland Memorial Mausoleum Chapel) in Portland, Oregon's Sellwood neighborhood, in the United States. It was an expansion of the Great Blue Heron Mural, which is seen on the building's lower west facing wall and was also applied by ArtFX Murals.

== Description ==
The expanded latex painting, located at Wilhelm's Portland Memorial Funeral Home (also known as the Portland Memorial Mausoleum Chapel; 6705 Southeast 14th Avenue) covers approximately 43,485 square feet across eight surfaces and is among the largest murals in the United States. It is visible from the Springwater Corridor and Interstate 5 and was funded by the Public Art Murals Program and private donors.

According to the Regional Arts & Culture Council, which administers the work, the mural "highlights the importance of the 160-acre Oaks Bottom Wildlife Refuge to the city of Portland's quality of life, the contribution of the wetland system as a critical element of the city's green infrastructure, and its contribution to maintaining biodiversity in the city and metropolitan area".

== See also ==
- 2009 in art
- Woodstock Mural, a Portland mural reproduced by Dan Cohen
