= Wilhelm's Portland Memorial Funeral Home =

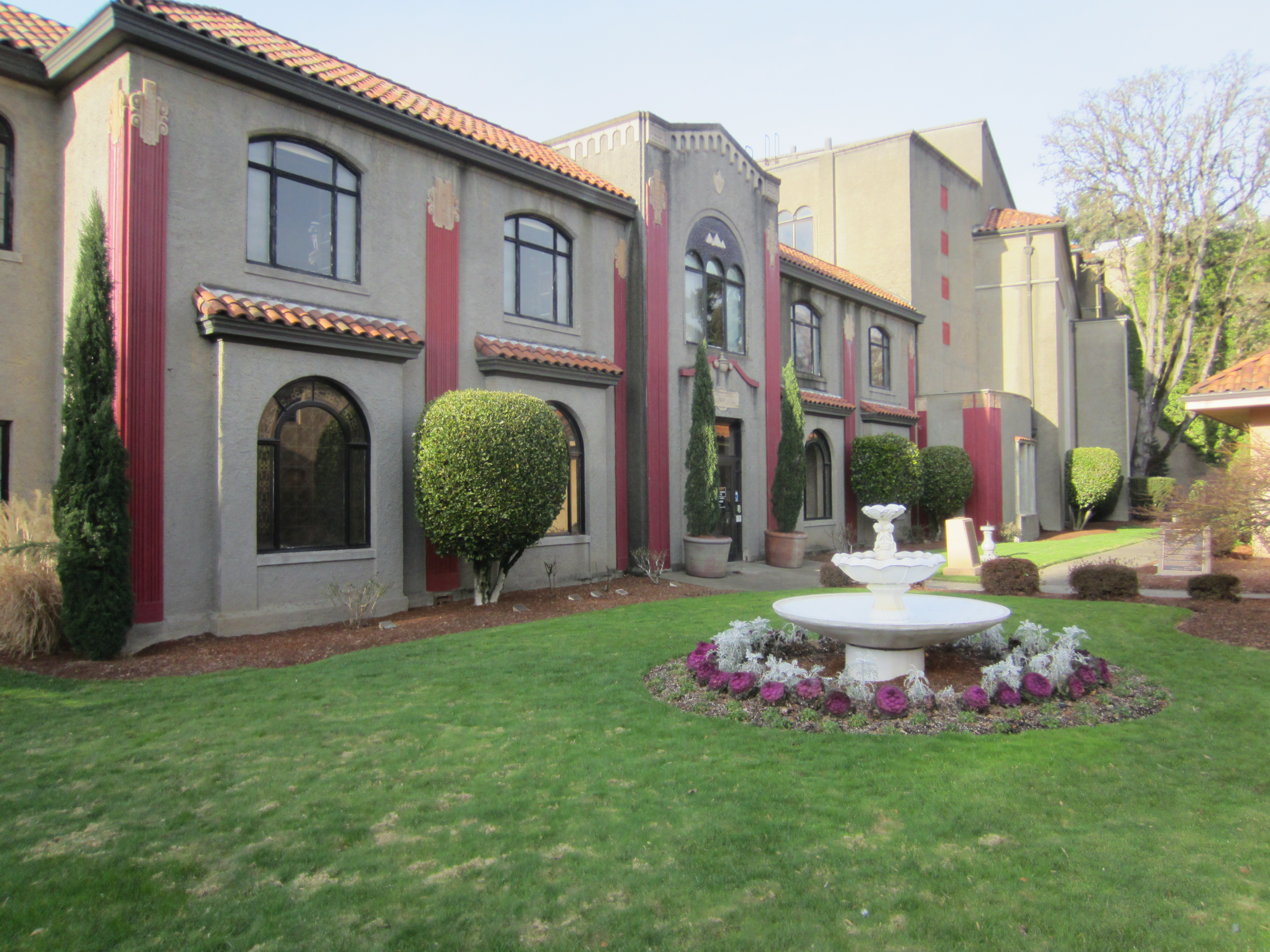
- Wilhelm's Portland Memorial in 2015

General information
- Architectural style: Mission Revival
- Location: 6705 SE 14th Avenue, Portland, Oregon, U.S.
- Coordinates: 45.4745°N 122.6519°W
- Opened: April 24, 1901

Website
- wilhelmportlandmemorial.com

Wilhelm's Portland Memorial Funeral Home, Mausoleum and Crematory is a funerary establishment in the Sellwood neighborhood of southeast Portland, Oregon, United States. Opened in 1901 as the Portland Crematorium, it is the first and oldest crematorium west of the Mississippi River, and the largest privately managed indoor burial site in the Pacific Northwest.

Established due to a growing demand for crematory services in Portland at the turn of the 20th century, the establishment evolved to house a mausoleum as well, which consists of eight stories and over 5 miles (8.0 km) of hallways, featuring ornate stained glass and Italian sculptures.

== History ==
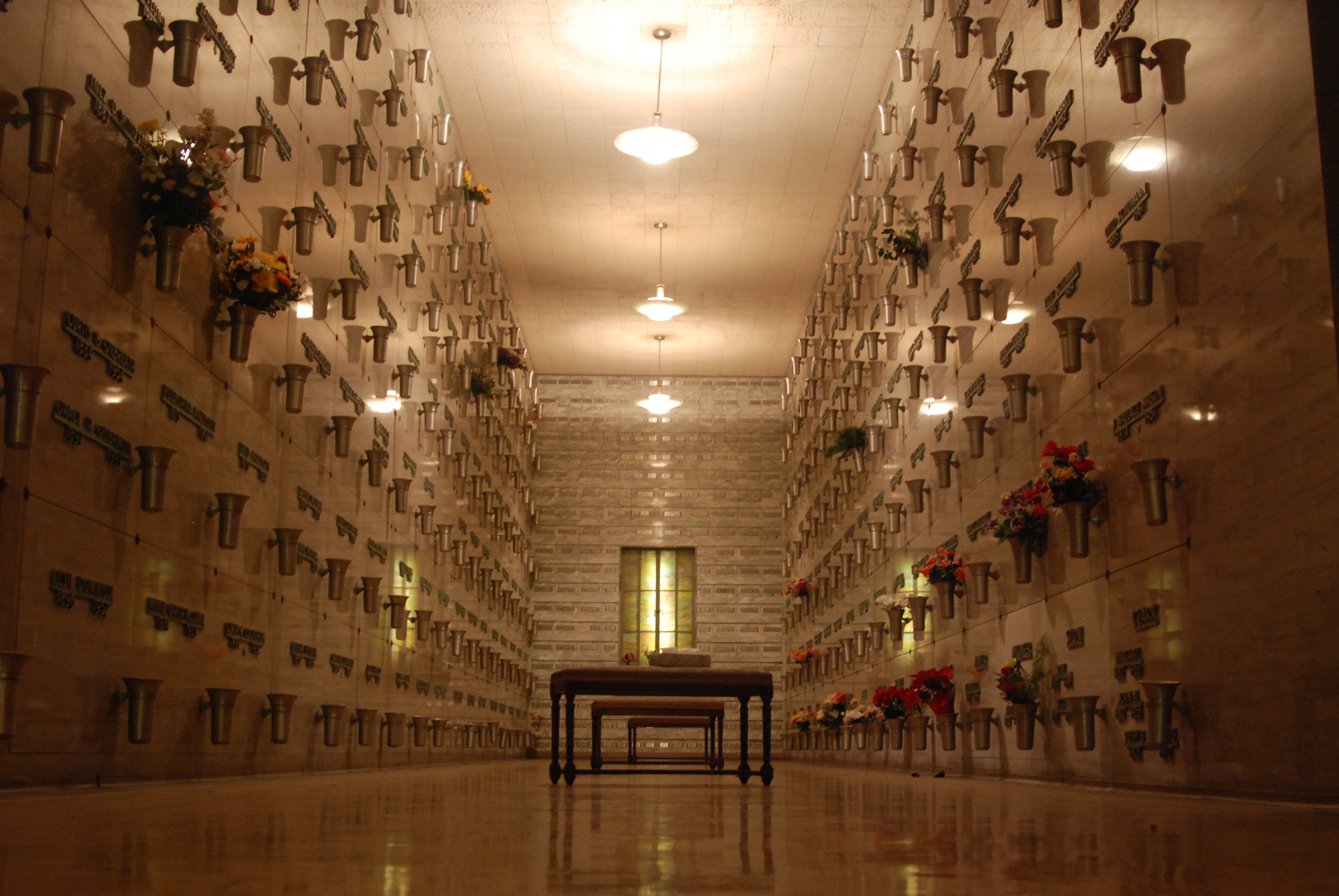
Large hall in mausoleum

Wilhelm's Portland Memorial Funeral Home was originally established as the Portland Crematorium on April 24, 1901, in response to the demand for crematory services in the Portland area. The Spanish Mission Revival-style mausoleum was built between 1900 and 1901, featuring whitewashed stucco walls, a tile roof, and mosaic tile doors. Frank Gibson, the secretary of the San Francisco Cremation Company, served as the first superintendent and manager of the crematory. At the time of its opening, charges for cremation were $45, and $25 for children under the age of twelve. Upon its opening, the Portland Railway, Light and Power Company operated a funeral car that could accommodate a casket as well as sitting benches for grieving family members.

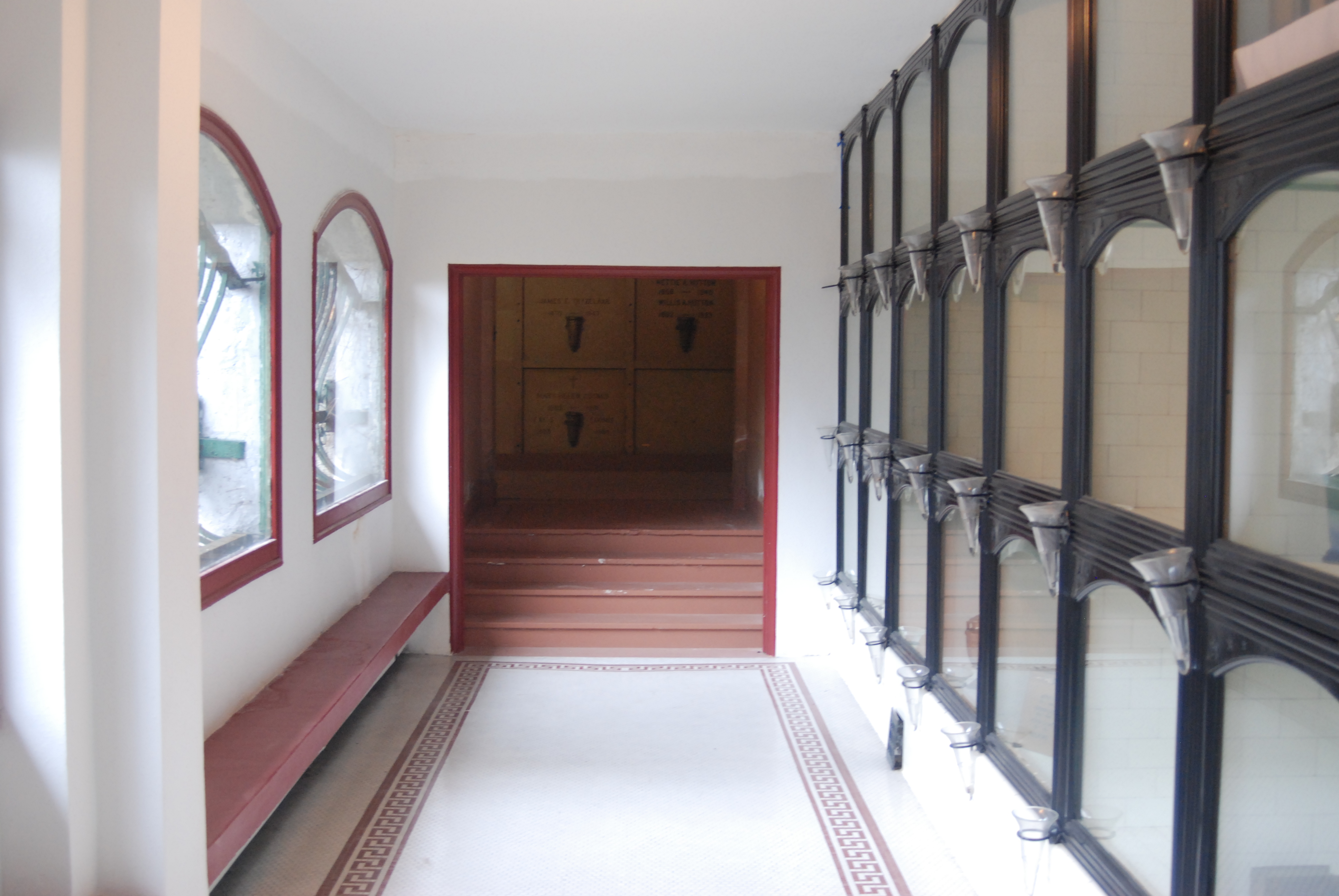
Mausoleum passageway

In subsequent decades, the crematorium expanded into a full-fledged mausoleum. Connected by vault-lined hallways, staircases, and elevators, the mausoleum faces the Willamette River and Oaks Bottom swamp, is eight stories in height, and contains over 5 miles (8.0 km) of hallways. The mausoleum features numerous marble fronts on crypts which originate from quarries in Italy, while a variety of statues and other religious sculptures throughout were made by the Italian Tavarelli Studios. One of the central statuaries in the mausoleum is a replica of Michelangelo's La Pietà. Stained glass crafted by the Povey Brothers is incorporated throughout.

The original crematorium building is the Rose Chamber, grouped with several rooms below it, also named after flowers: the Lily, Daisy, Tulip, and Carnation Rooms. Various wings throughout the mausoleum take their names from religious figures as well as U.S. presidents.

== Accessibility ==
Wilhelm's Portland Memorial Funeral Home is open to the public. Each Memorial Day, the historic private tomb of George Rae, one of the wealthiest men in Portland history, is open to the public for 90 minutes.

== Notable burials ==
- Homer Daniel Angell, U.S. congressman
- Charlie Babb, Major League Baseball player
- Jack Beutel, actor
- William Alexander Ekwall, U.S. congressman
- William Russell Ellis, educator and politician
- Marie Equi, Doctor and Activist
- Joseph Franz, co-founder of Franz Bakery
- Charlie High, Major League Baseball player
- Carrie Clyde Holly, stateswoman
- Robert Denison Holmes, 28th Governor of Oregon
- Syl Johnson, Major League Baseball player
- Fielder Jones, Major League Baseball player
- Rufus Mallory, politician and lawyer
- Mayo Methot, actress
- Theodore Penland, U.S. soldier
- Charlie Swindells, Major League Baseball player
- Wayne Twitchell, Major League Baseball player
- John Yeon, architect

== Gallery ==
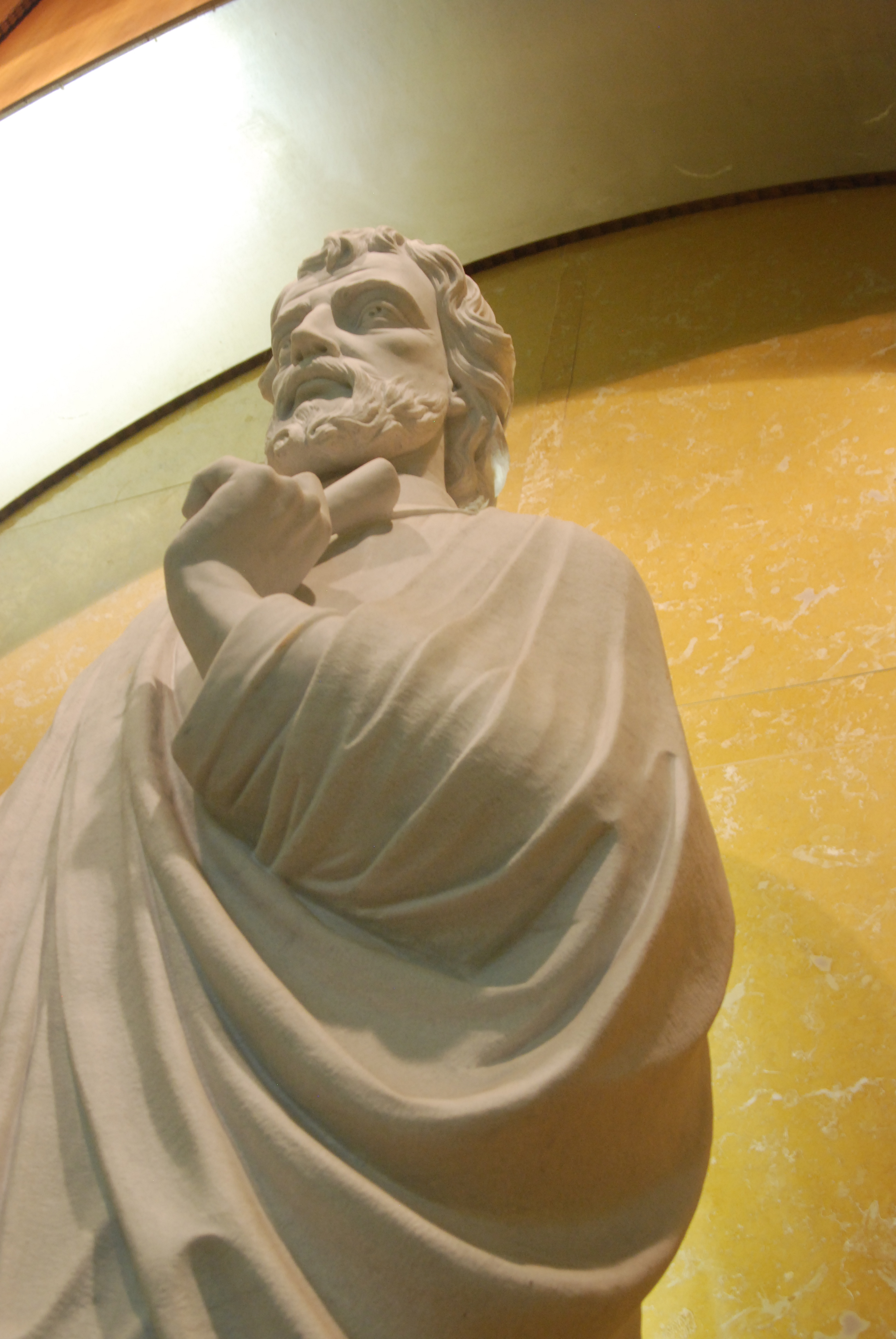
Sculpture in mausoleum

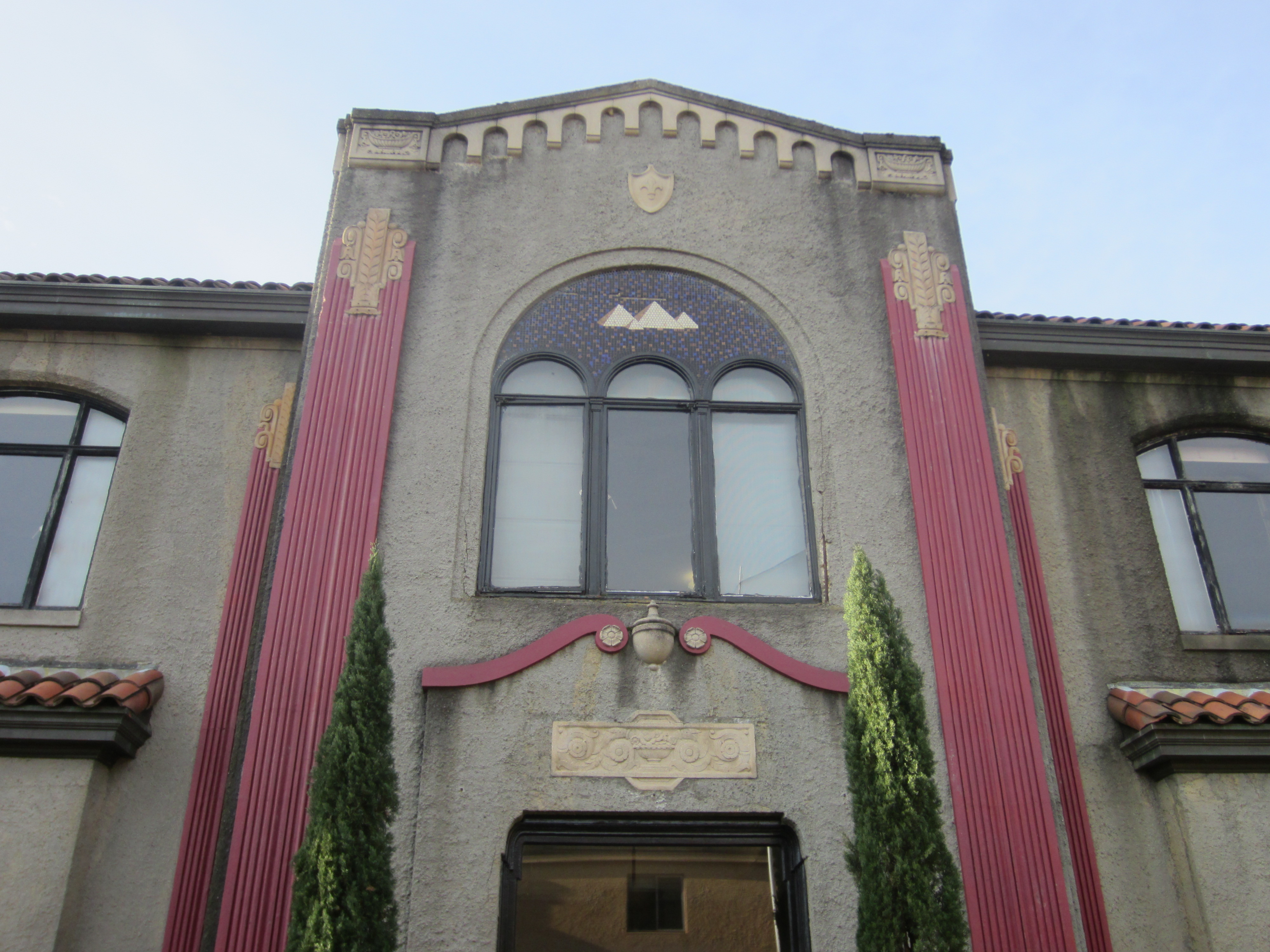
Mausoleum entry

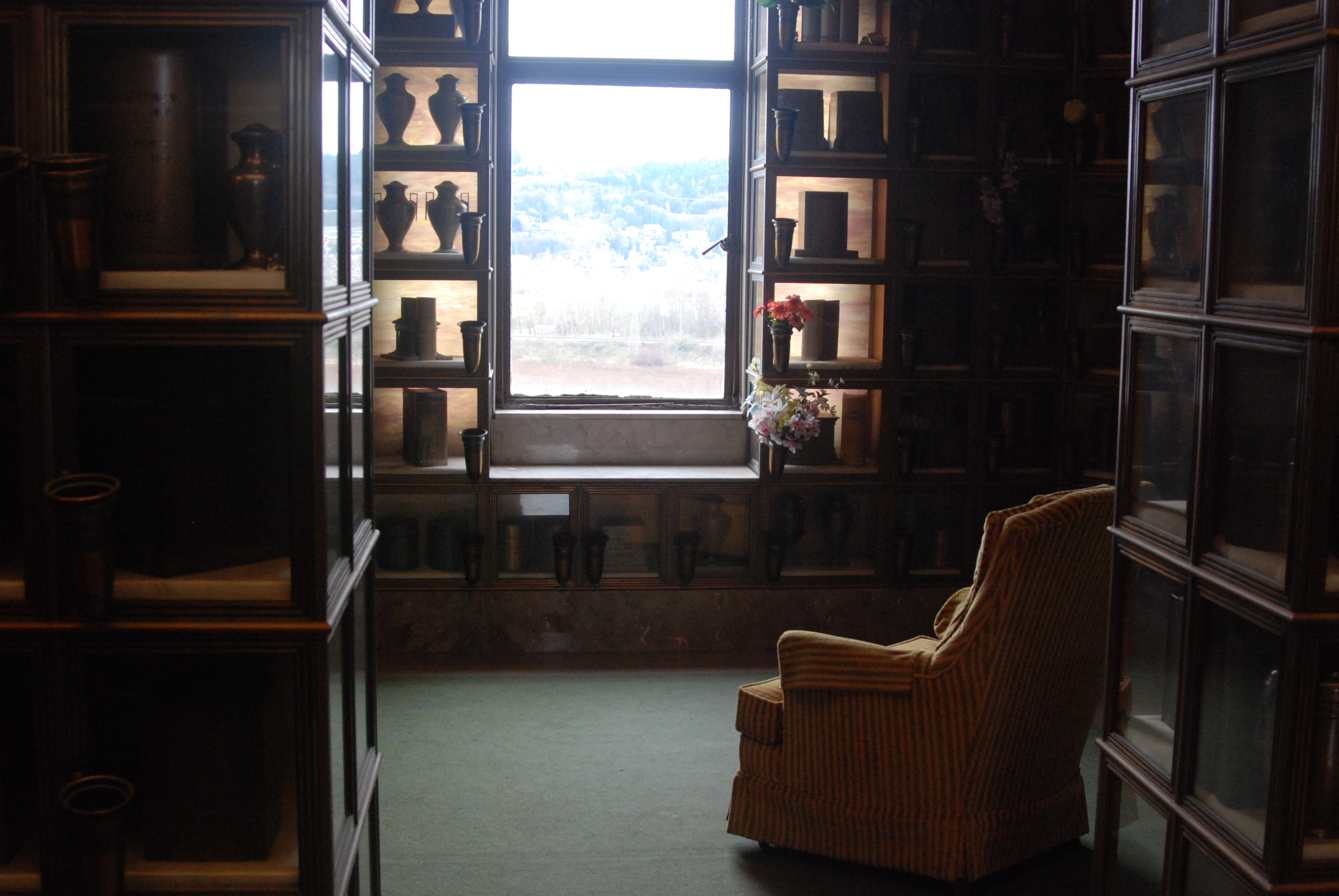
Seating area

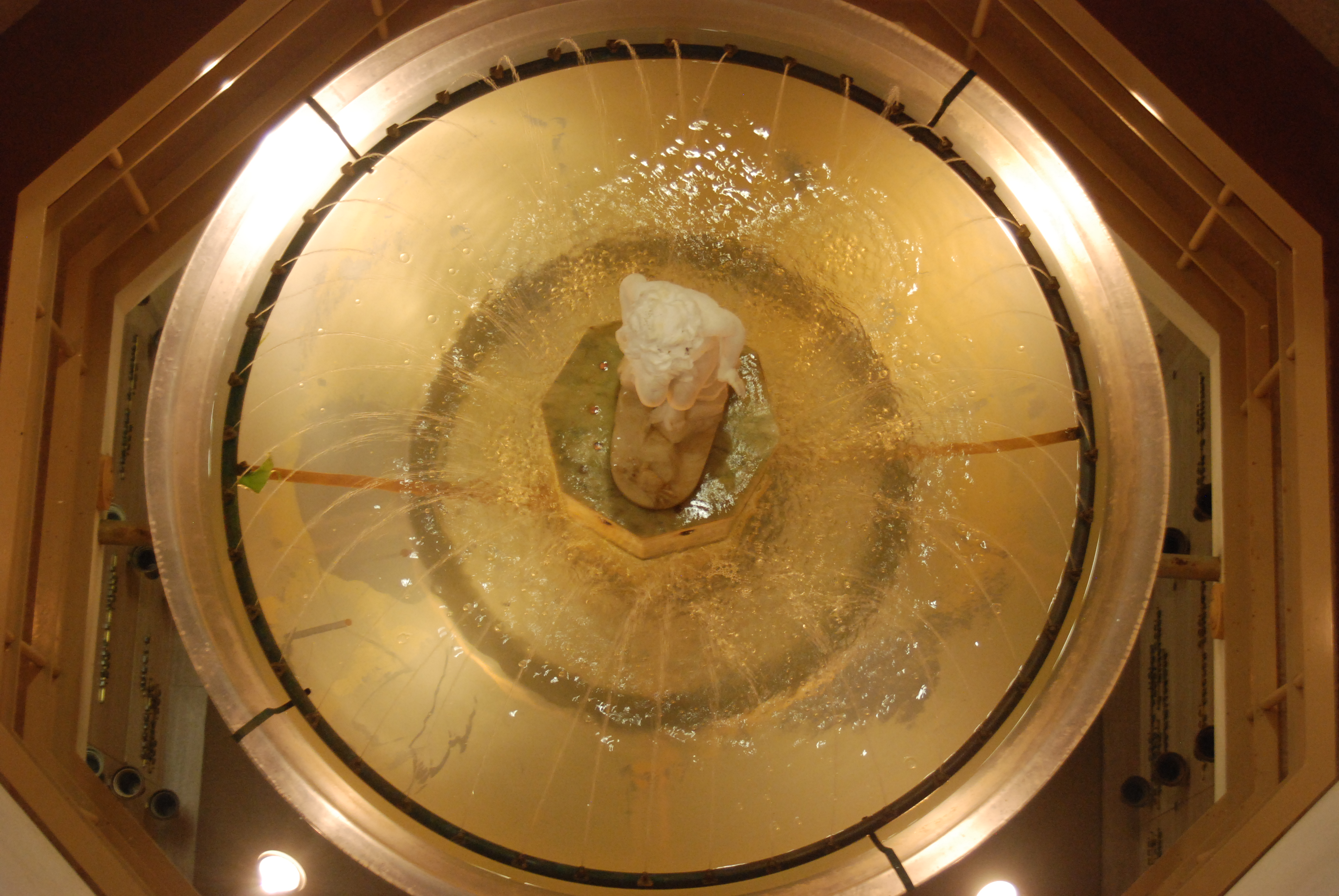
Overhead view of fountain above atrium

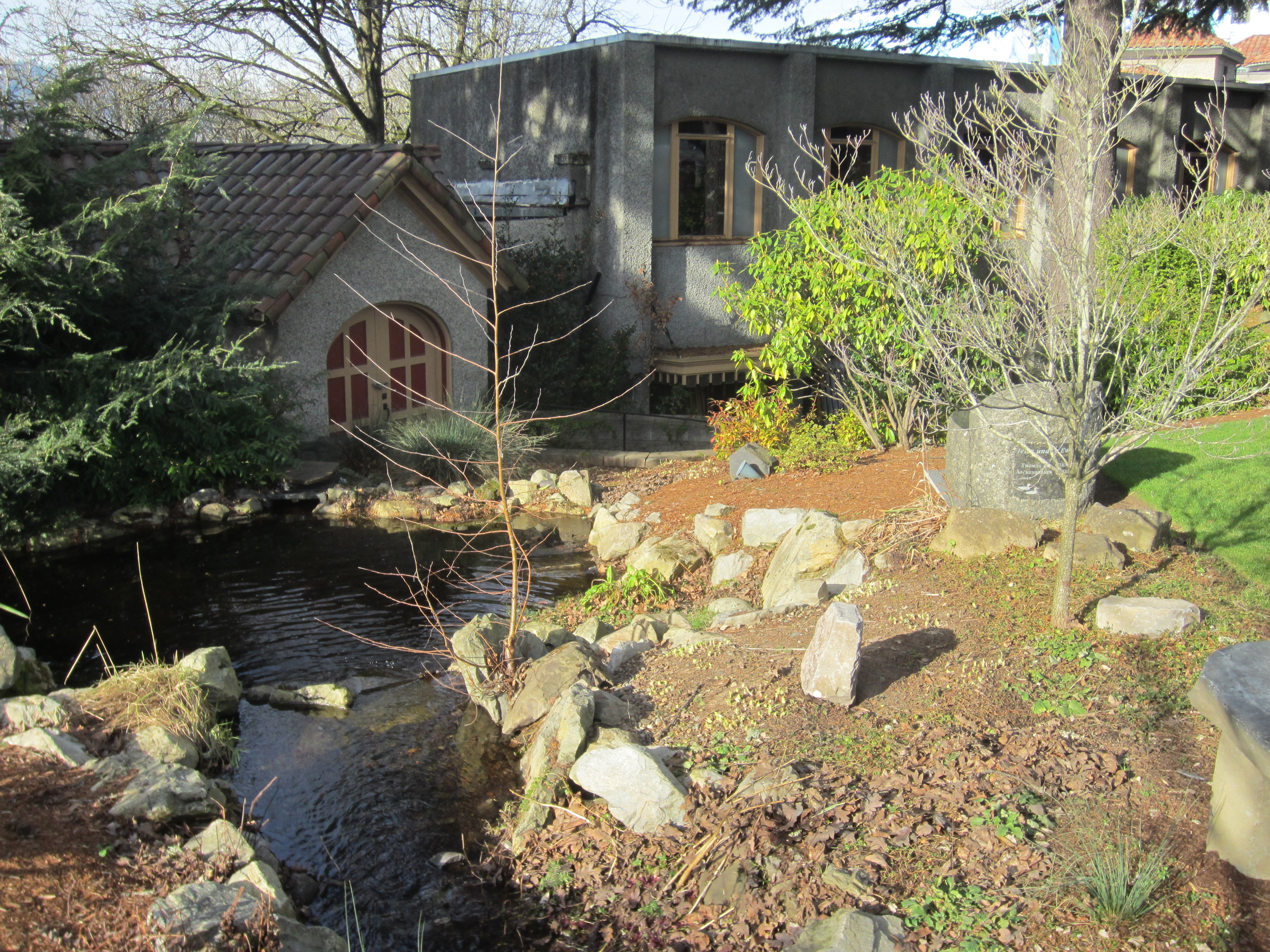
South end of building

== See also ==
- Memorial Day in Portland, Oregon
- Portland Memorial Mausoleum Mural (2009)

== Sources ==
- Barnes, Christine (2004). Only in Oregon: Natural and Manmade Landmarks and Oddities. Helena, Montana: Farcountry Press. ISBN 978-1-560-37292-9.
- Lee, Bill (2015). The Baseball Necrology: The Post-Baseball Lives and Deaths of More Than 7,600 Major League Players and Others. Jefferson, North Carolina: McFarland. ISBN 978-1-476-60930-0.
- Spencer, Thomas E. (1998). Where They're Buried: A Directory Containing More Than Twenty Thousand Names of Notable Persons Buried in American Cemeteries, with Listings of Many Prominent People who Were Cremated. Baltimore, Maryland: Clearfield Company. ISBN 978-0-806-34823-0.
