= Lutz Tavern =

Bar in Portland, Oregon, U.S.

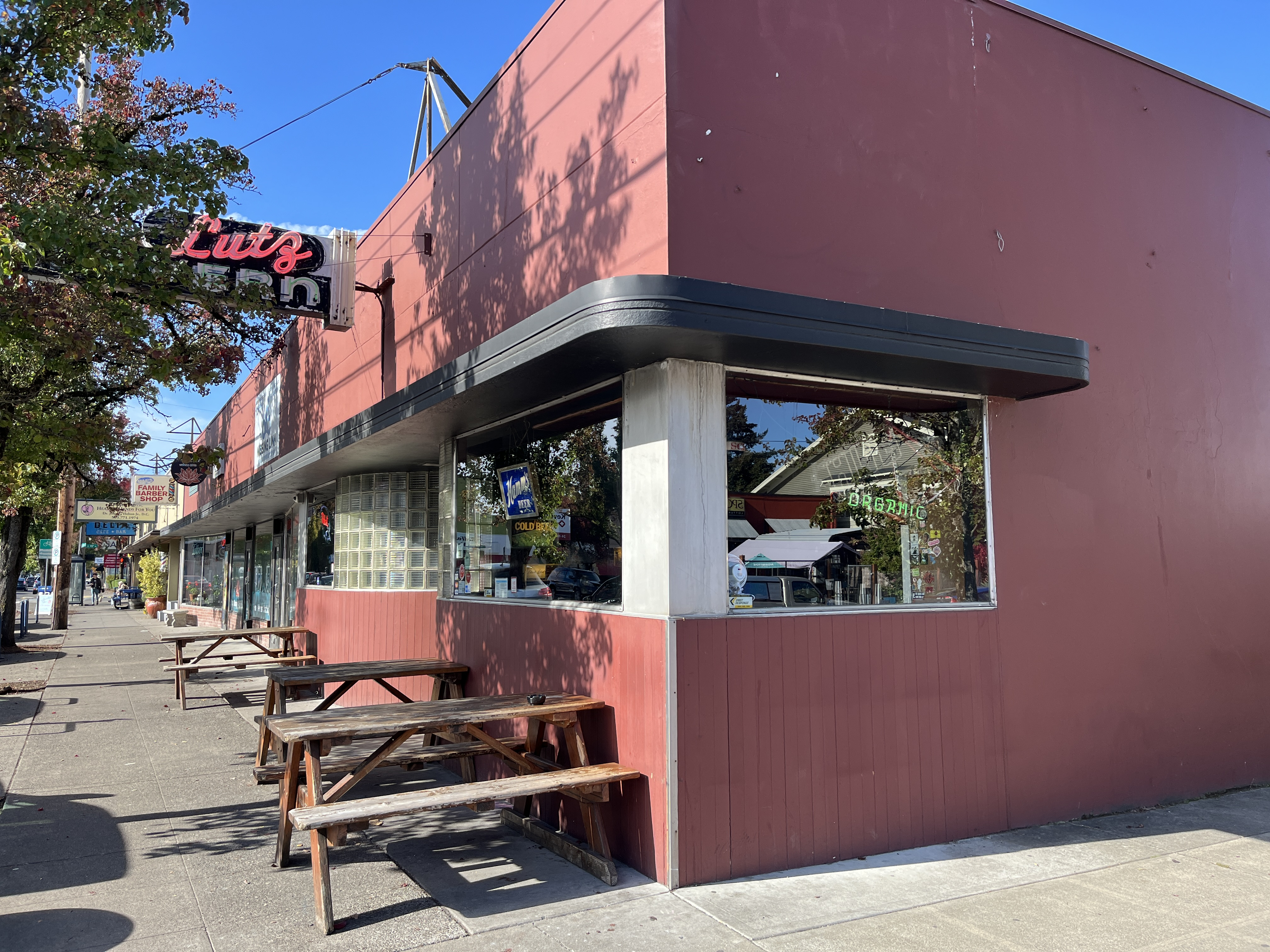
- Exterior in 2024
- Interactive map of Lutz Tavern

Restaurant information
- Established: 1947
- Previous owners: Lutz family (1947–1954); Barisich family (1954–2010); Robert Kowalski
- Location: 4639 Southeast Woodstock Boulevard, Portland, Multnomah, Oregon, 97206, United States
- Coordinates: 45.47938°N 122.61461°W
- Reservations: No
- Website: lutztavern.com

Lutz Tavern is a bar in the Woodstock neighborhood of Portland, Oregon, in the United States. It was established by the Lutz family in 1947, who maintained ownership until the business was purchased by the Barisich family in 1954. Working-class locals and Reed College students frequent the bar, which is known for popularizing the beer Pabst Blue Ribbon. Lutz closed in 2010 after being run by the Barisich family for 56 years, then re-opened under new ownership and management in 2011.

== Description and history ==
Lutz Tavern, established in 1947, is located at 4639 Southeast Woodstock Boulevard in Portland's Woodstock neighborhood. The Lutz family owned the bar until 1954, when it was purchased by the Barisich family. Lilias Barisich, who shared ownership with her brothers after their parents handed it over to them, said of the bar and her mother's operating style: "It's always been a homey place because my mom would kick people out if they acted different. She'd tell them they wouldn't act that way if they were invited to our home for dinner, so there was no call to act like that at the Lutz." For many years, Lutz attracted a mixture of working-class men and Reed College students. The Portland Mercury said the bar served "cheap swill to blue-collar folks and Reed kids that didn't mind walking those extra few blocks." Barisich recalled that "at one time, it was a favorite of concrete workers, city crews and the like. You couldn't keep the floor clean on a Friday afternoon. Every muddy workboot in the city was here." It served beer only, accepted cash only, and offered the "bare minimum of food that the OLCC required".

The crowd became steadily younger over time. Lutz has had a "symbiotic bar-restaurant relationship" with nearby Delta Cafe (opened in 1995), where guests on waiting lists for the restaurant could wait in the bar. Before cell phones, Lutz staff would receive calls from Delta and announce when reserved parties could be seated. The nearby music venue 17 Nautical Miles also drew people to the bar. The Oregonian's John Foyston said of the bar in 1999, "The floor stays cleaner, but the decor remains minimal: beer signs, a pool table, handwritten signs advertising the famous hot pickles (60 cents) and ham sandwiches ($2)." Willamette Week called Lutz a "true dive, but one with outsize influence among bike messengers and other curators of cool".

=== Beer ===
In the 1990s, when her parents still operated the bar, Barisich asked if she could sell a case of what was then considered premium beer. She recalled, "I convinced them to let me buy a case of Heineken's, which at that time sold for unheard-of price of a buck a bottle. My dad said that people would never pay that much for a bottle of beer, and they'd only let me buy the case if I promised to drink what didn't sell." Her introduction of premium beer proved to be successful. Lutz would soon be recognized by Blitz-Weinhard for serving more Blitz beer than any other establishment. In 1999, Lutz reportedly served BridgePort IPA, Sierra Nevada Pale Ale and Widmer Hop Jack and Hefeweizen for $2.60 per pint, but still offered Blitz and Pabst Blue Ribbon for $1 per can.

==== Pabst Blue Ribbon ====
Though the claim is disputed, Lutz is known nationally for being the origin of Pabst Blue Ribbon's recent popularity. In 2015, Willamette Week's Matthew Singer invited representatives from Lutz and EJ's, the former bar, strip club, and music venue in northeast Portland which also claims to have re-introduced Pabst, to explain their competing claims. Layne Martin, who managed Lutz from 1994 to 2000, said:

There was this absolute scorching deal on cases of PBR and kegs. We were one of the few outlets in Portland that sold kegs to go, so we could sell them at a really good deal. So we started the PBR dollar-can special. I'd say it was around 1997 or 1998. At one point, I know they said we were the largest distributor of Pabst in the state, if not the country. We got written up in The New York Times about it. We were going through hundreds of cases and dozens of kegs a week.

Mike Thrasher, EJ's talent buyer from 1995 to 1999, recalled:

I started working at EJ's when it was a strip club in about October 1994. A couple of the key staff and I convinced the owner we would do better as a rock-'n'-roll bar, and decided to launch the new format on Jan. 1, 1995. As a future rock club, we decided we needed to rethink our drink selections to suit that clientele. While comparing the prices of the domestic beers, we found that Pabst was cheapest at $33 per keg. The club gained popularity, and Pabst became the drink of choice. On Tuesdays, Pabst was sold at the full price of $1.75, but there was no cover to see the bands. Things kept getting busier. It was suggested that Thursdays become a 'beer bust,' where a patron could get unlimited Pabst between opening at 6 pm and 8 pm, when the room was cleared for the show. By this time, perhaps mid-1996, EJ's had achieved some recognition from touring bands and had a steady influx of national talent, which again increased sales. During busy months, we were getting three deliveries a week and moving more than 40 kegs a month. Years later, Pabst became known as the 'hipster' beer of Portland. There is no way for me to warrant that EJ's decision to make PBR its house beer caused this impact, but I have done so nonetheless, for years.

Matt Slessler, the field marketing manager for Pabst's Pacific region, weighed in on the debate as well, saying:

We've always thought Lutz was the first one to sell it. But it's like how people claim they saw Wilt Chamberlain's 100-point game or were at Woodstock. The landscape is littered with salesmen who say, 'Oh yeah, I was the first one to bring that in.' The first PBR I ever had was at the Jockey Club, this really old-school punk-rock bar on Killingsworth. As far as the very first ones, there was the Lutz and EJ's, and it's always been our thought that Lutz was first.

In 2003, Willamette Week published an image of a man drinking Pabst at Lutz with a caption making fun of "middle-class, college-educated, salaried Portland hipsters" for drinking that brand of beer, and noting its relation to MillerCoors.

=== Closing and reopening ===
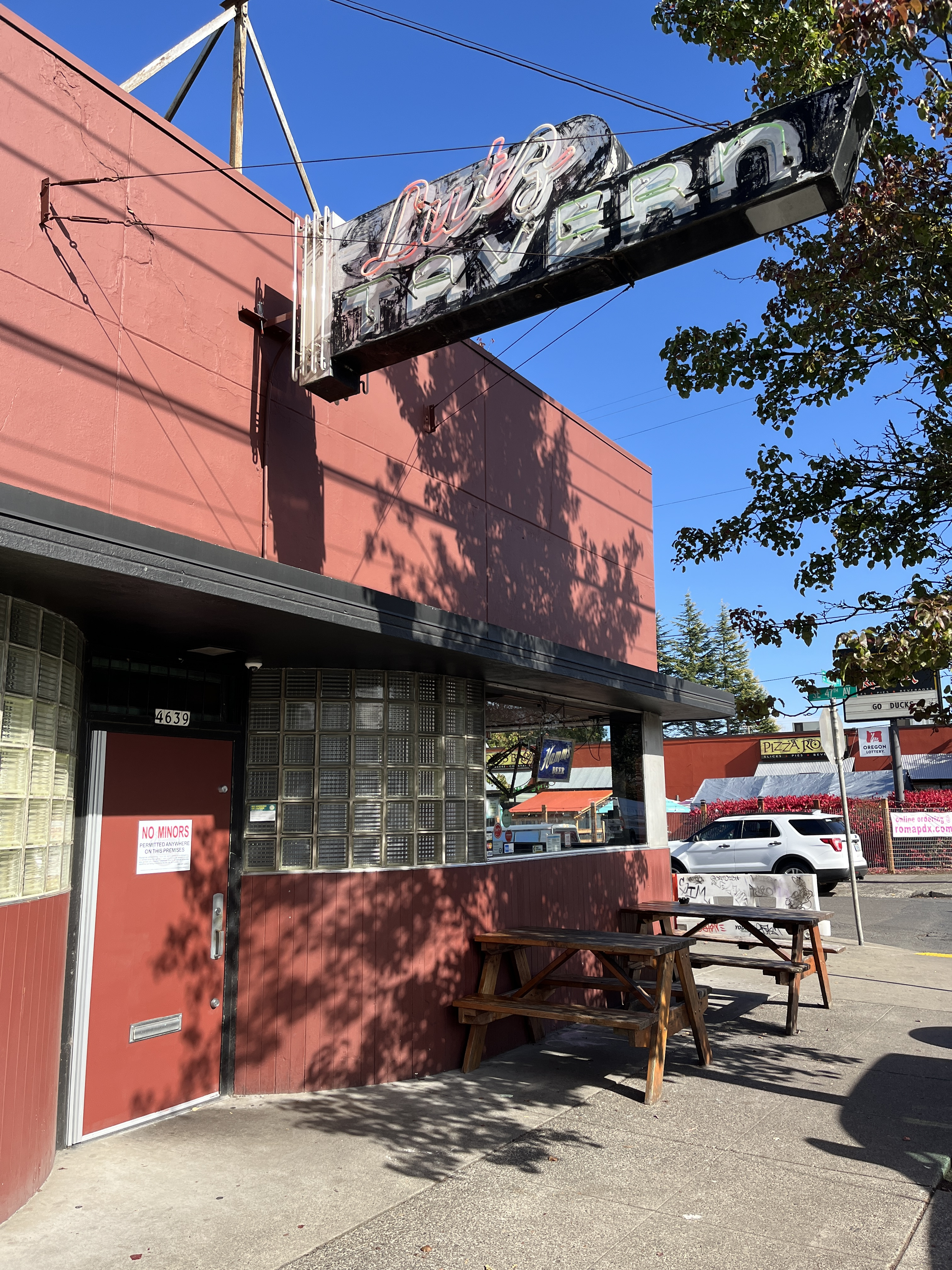
Front entrance in 2024

In September 2010, after operating Lutz for 56 years, the owners held a "farewell bash" and closed its doors after deciding that they could no longer borrow money to stay open. However, the bar was re-opened in 2011 by the staff of the Portland establishments Clinton Street Pub and Crow Bar. Willamette Week reported that Lutz began serving liquor, eight taps of "good Northwest micros, and a real kitchen that makes a kick-ass burger" as the result of new management.

The Woodstock Neighborhood Association (WNA) originally made plans to paint Woodstock Mural on the east exterior of Lutz. In August 2012, the Regional Arts & Culture Council (RACC) confirmed funding of $6,000 for the 60-by-15-foot (18.3 m × 4.6 m) painting. The mural's design was divided into three parts to accommodate the exterior wall's three sections. RACC published an image of artist Mike Lawrence's proposed mural and said the goal of the project was to "highlight the best of the neighborhood and instill a sense of community pride". The agency also said the project was still raising funds and hoped to start in the spring of 2013. Efforts stalled, but WNA later proposed a mural with a different design for the east side of the nearby Red Fox Vintage building.

In 2013, Lutz earned top honors in the Dill Pickle Club's annual "Perfect Pickle" competition, in which nine restaurants competed.

In 2014, The Oregonian reported that Robert Kowalski was the owner of Lutz and several other local establishments, including Crow Bar and Clinton Street Pub.

== Reception ==
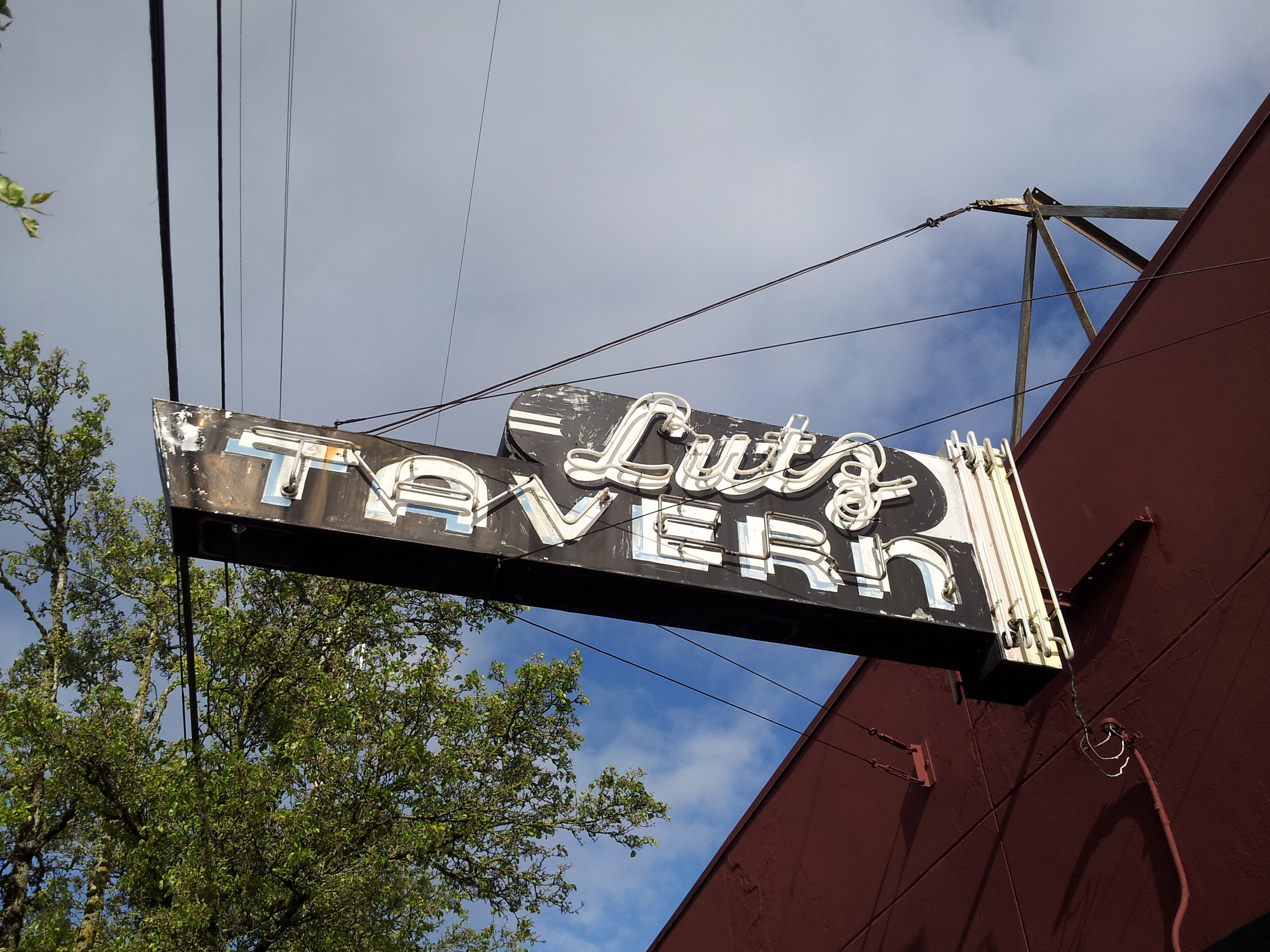
Lutz Tavern signage in 2014

The Lutz has been a part of the community for decades. Shortly following Lutz's 2011 re-opening, Ben Waterhouse of Willamette Week quipped that the bar had kept its "old look and clientele: The lineup at the bar on a recent Friday was plaid, fleece, tweed, plaid, plaid, plaid and tweed." In Willamette Week's 2014 "Bar Guide", Matthew Korfhage described Lutz as an "old-school, diner-countered, deep-boothed drinking hole" serving "Reedies, old rockers and rank-and-file preservers of the AFL-CIO to equal satisfaction". He wrote, "The bar's been upgraded in recent years, but this mostly just means the diner-style food's edible and there's no pay phone. But if you hang around past 11 pm on a Friday, the wild union boys of Woodstock again arrive to reclaim the place, smokin', hootin', hollerin', who cares? It's the Lutz."

In 2016, Thrillist contributor Dan Schlegel wrote, "The lived-in charm of this Woodstock haunt feels a lot like something out of a Paul Thomas Anderson movie, like the place where you'd meet up at 2 in the afternoon for a drink or six with an estranged half-brother who's involved in some weird pyramid scheme. The cocktails are stiff, the beer list is impressive, and the clientele has way fewer nail-biting Reedies than you'd expect." Nathan Williams recommended Lutz in Eater Portland's 2022 overview of eateries in the Woodstock neighborhood.
