= Memorial Day in Portland, Oregon =

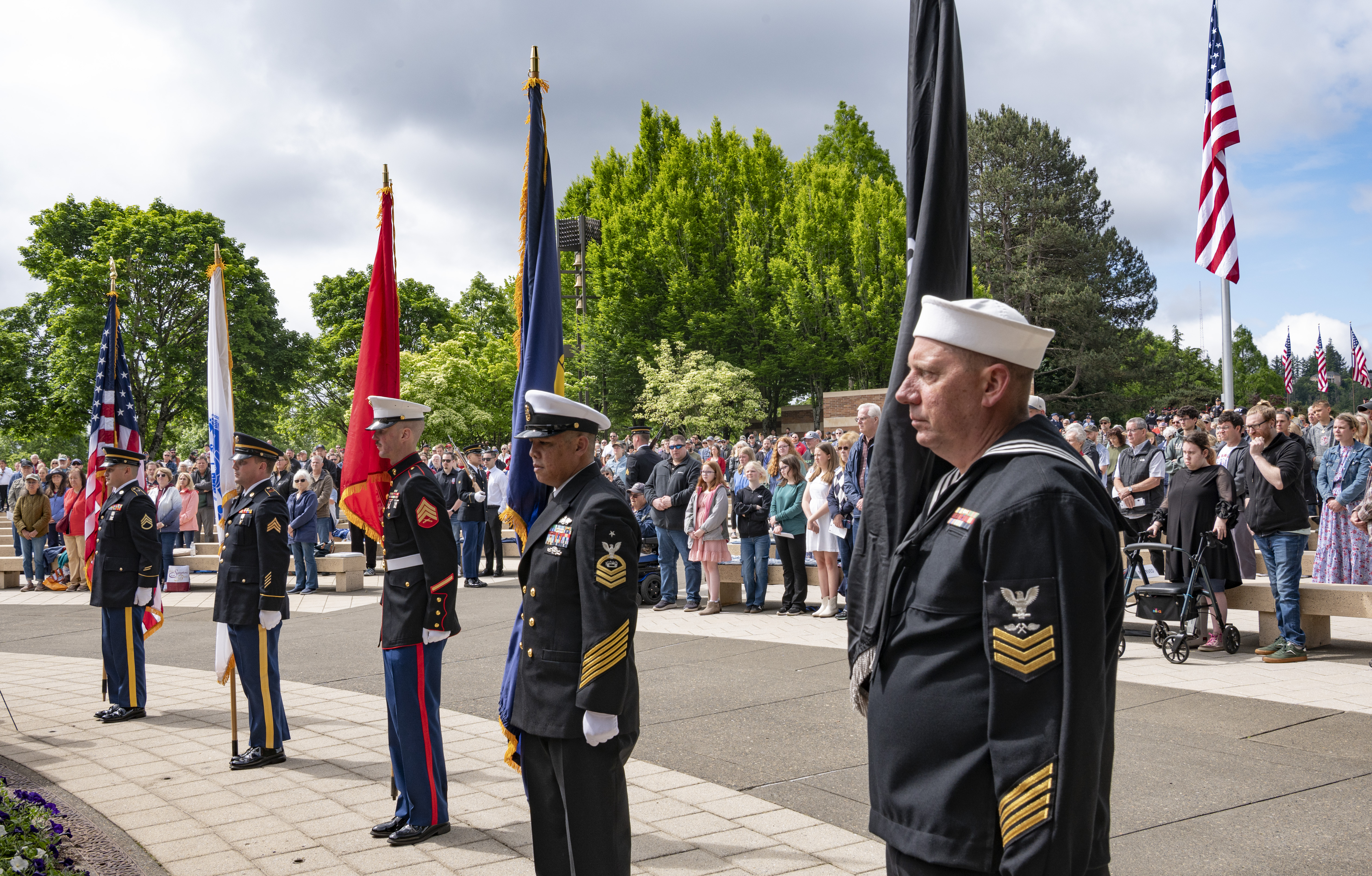
Military members of a Joint Service Honor Guard team retire the colors after the Memorial Day observance at Willamette National Cemetery, Portland, Oregon, 2025

The American federal holiday Memorial Day is celebrated annually in Portland, Oregon. Several sites host memorial services, including the Oregon Vietnam Veterans Memorial and Willamette National Cemetery. Memorial Day is the only time the Wilhelm's Portland Memorial Funeral Home and grounds are open to the public. City offices close for the holiday. The holiday impacts local public transport and parking enforcement.

== Events and activities ==
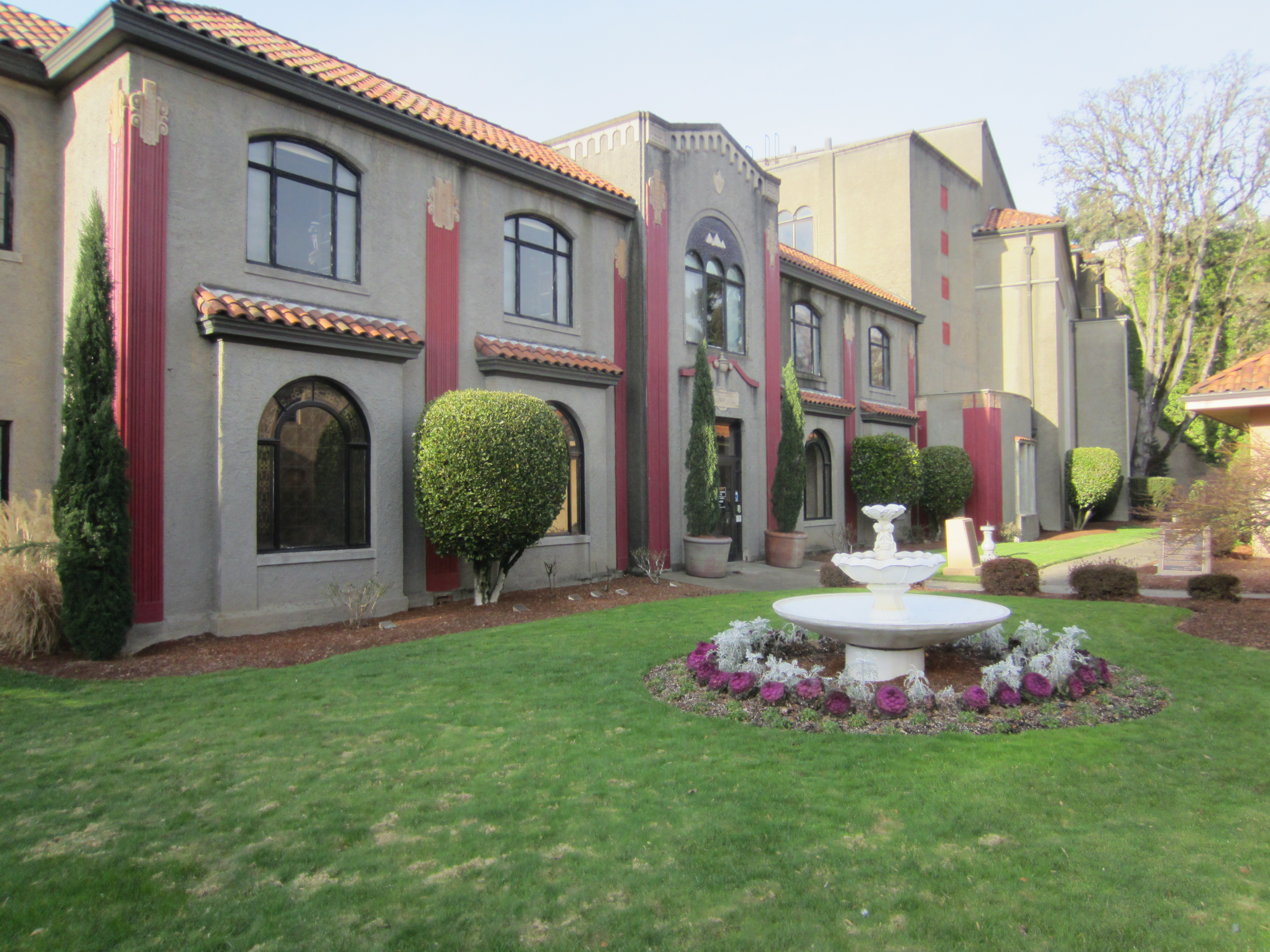
The Wilhelm's Portland Memorial Funeral Home and grounds are only open to the public on Memorial Day.

The annual Portland Rose Festival usually begins on Memorial Day weekend. The Multnomah County Fair is usually held at Oaks Amusement Park on the holiday weekend. Activities include entertainment, Hispanic dancing, music, and singing, as well as a low-rider auto show and dachshund racing. The Wilhelm's Portland Memorial Funeral Home and grounds in the Sellwood-Moreland neighborhood of Southeast Portland are only open to the public on Memorial Day. In 2024, dozens of veterans and supporters participated in Do Good Multnomah's Memorial Day Ruck March, which served as a fundraiser to provide services to veterans experiencing homelessness. The route started and ended at the University of Portland.

For decades, the Hawthorne Boulevard Business Association and a local scout troop have placed American flags along Hawthorne Boulevard in Southeast Portland. In 2023, the Southeast Examiner said, "In recent years, the flags have been vandalized or stolen and last year the two groups made the decision to suspend placement. They hope the resumption of this tradition will be a reminder about what the flag represents–a dedication to democracy, equality and freedom for people to be who they are and want to be."

=== Memorial services ===
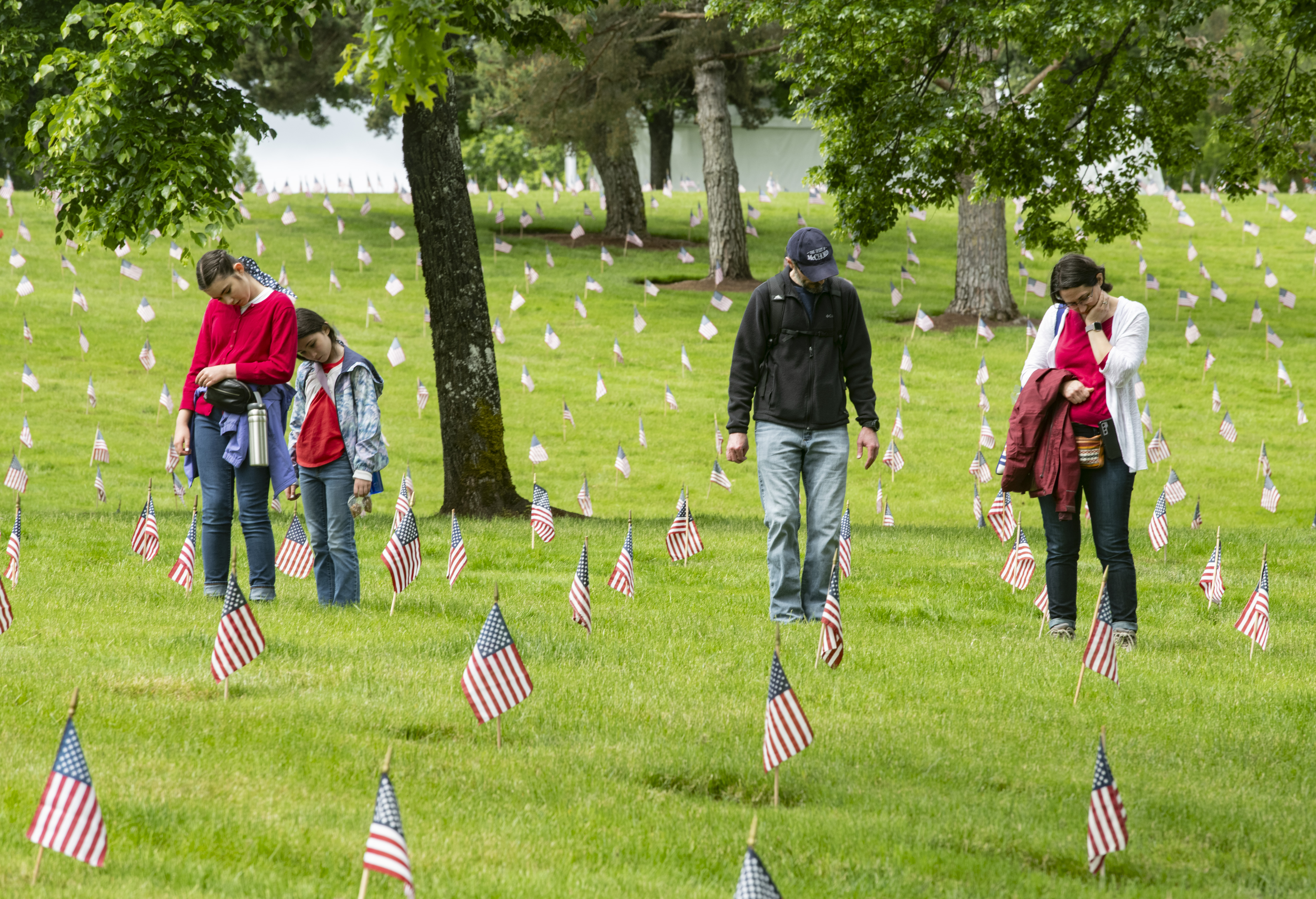
Memorial Day observances at Willamette National Cemetery in 2025

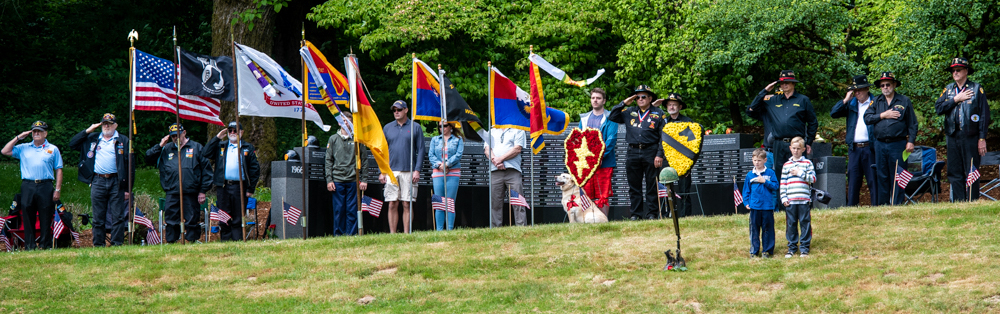
Veterans and other spectators stand for the playing of the national anthem at the Oregon Vietnam Veterans Memorial during the Memorial Day ceremony, 2018

Since 1950, the U.S. Department of Veterans Affairs has hosted the region's largest annual commemoration at Willamette National Cemetery. Each year, scout troops place tens of thousands of flags ahead of the holiday; in 2010, approximately 1,000 people placed 140,000 flags. More than 2,500 people were expected to attend in 2018. The program for the 2018 ceremony included a 21-shot cannon salute by the 218th Field Artillery of the Oregon National Guard, a benediction, and a performance by the 173rd Fighter Wing of the Oregon Air National Guard. The 2022 ceremony had speeches, the playing of Taps, a rifle salute, and music performed by the 234th Army Band and the Portland Police Highland Guard Pipe Band. Approximately 100 people attended. In 2024, hundreds of people placed flags at the site and U.S. Senator Ron Wyden spoke at the ceremony. In 2025, hundreds attended and the flag-laying ceremony started with a flyover by a U.S. Coast Guard helicopter. The site was also on the flyover path for F-15 Eagle fighter jets from the 142nd Wing out of the Portland Air National Guard Base in 2019 and from 2022 to 2025. The 2020 and 2021 services were cancelled because of the COVID-19 pandemic.

The Oregon Vietnam Veterans Memorial in Washington Park has hosted memorial services since 1988. The program for the 2024 ceremony included bagpipe music, an invocation, speakers, and a 21-gun salute. The 2025 ceremony included a flyover by the West Coast Ravens, a posting of the colors, and the playing of "The Star-Spangled Banner".

Services have also been held at Lincoln Memorial Park.

== Public transport and services ==
The holiday impacts local public transport. In 2025, TriMet buses and MAX Light Rail trains operated on a weekend schedule, and the Portland Aerial Tram was closed. With some exceptions, parking meters are not enforced.

== See also ==
- Culture of Portland, Oregon
