= Woodstock Park (Portland, Oregon) =

Public park in Portland, Oregon, U.S.

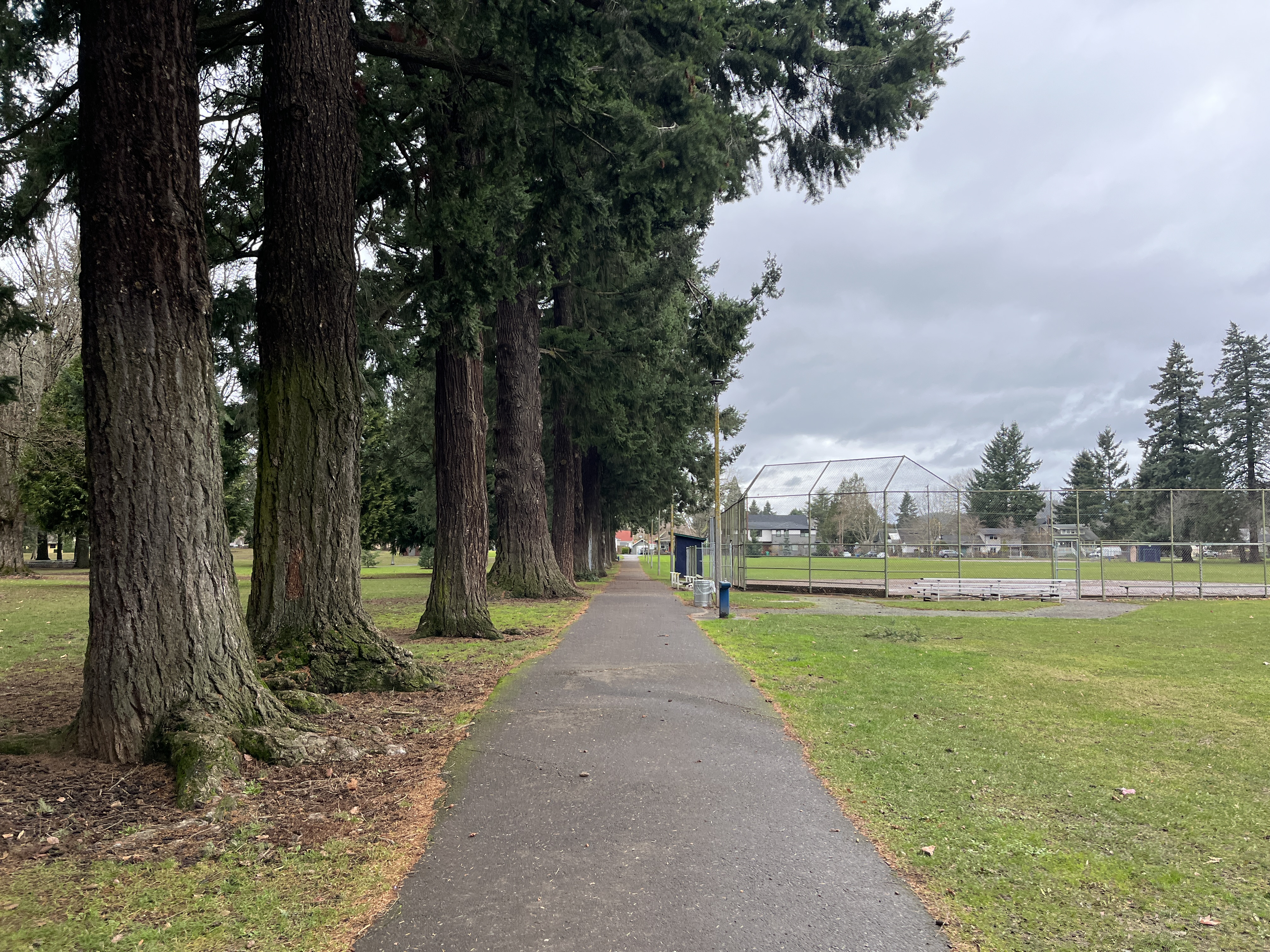
- Part of the park in 2024

- Location within Portland, Oregon
- Location: Southeast 47th Avenue and Steele Street
- Nearest city: Portland, Oregon
- Coordinates: 45°29′1.22″N 122°36′45.92″W
- Area: 14.11 acres (5.71 ha)
- Created: 1921
- Operator: Portland Parks & Recreation
- Open: 5 a.m. to midnight daily

Woodstock Park is a public park located in the Woodstock neighborhood of southeast Portland, Oregon, in the United States.

== Description and history ==
Operated by Portland Parks & Recreation, the park was acquired in 1921 and measures 14.11 acres (5.71 ha). SE 47th Avenue and SE 50th Avenue form the west and east boundaries; Woodstock Park is bounded by SE Steele Street to the north and by SE Harold Street and Woodstock School to the south.

Amenities include a dog off-leash area, horseshoe pit, paved paths, picnic tables, a playground, public art, restroom facilities, soccer and softball fields and tennis courts. The park is open between 5 a.m. and midnight daily. The park has hosted high school softball games, movies, Woodstock School reunions, and an annual event known as "Unimproved Road". In 2012, Portland Parks & Recreation budget cuts threatened to close Woodstock Park's restroom facility and reduce daily care.

== See also ==
- List of parks in Portland, Oregon
