= Grand Central Bakery =

Independent and local bakery/restaurant chain in Oregon and Washington

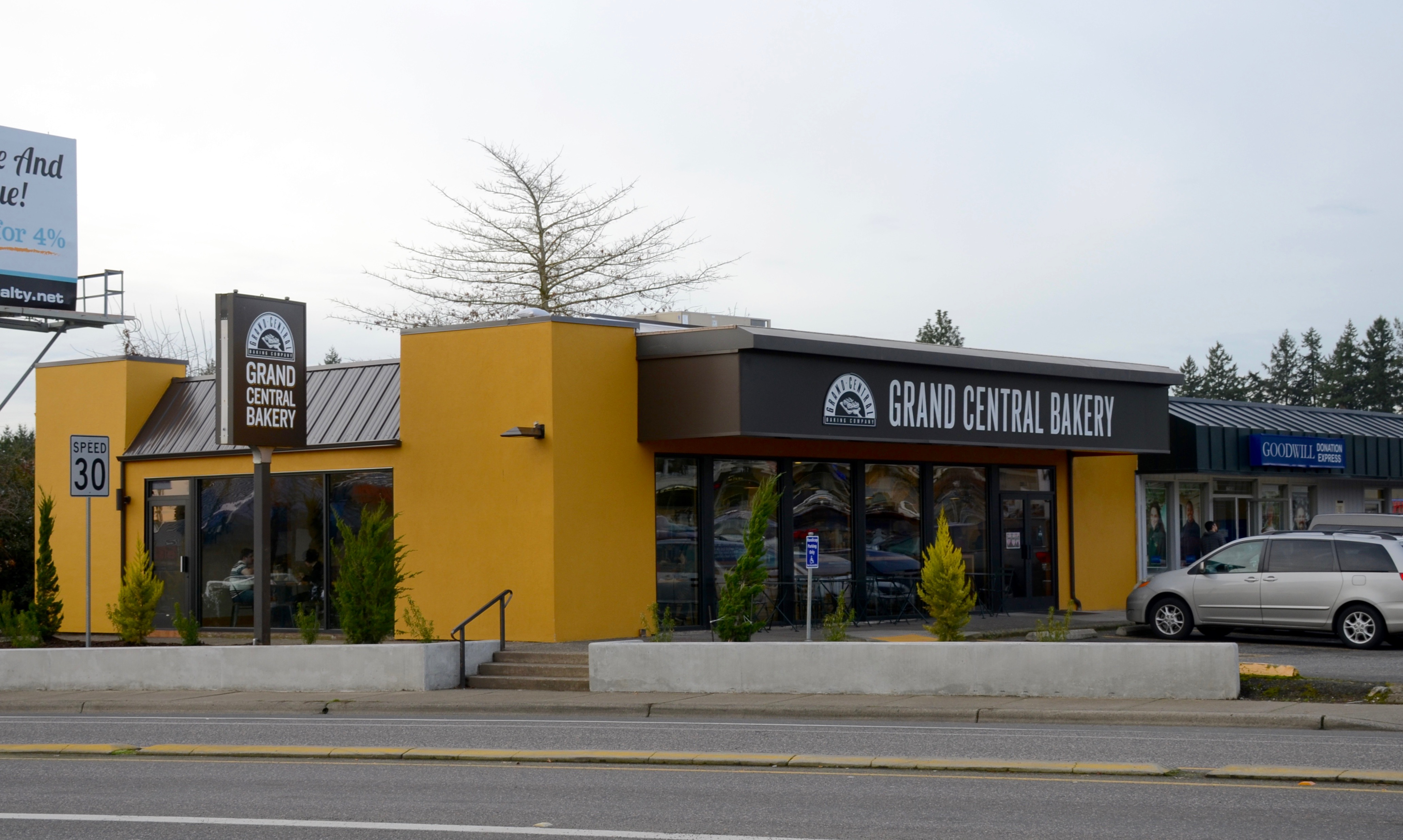
- A Grand Central Bakery in Cedar Mill, Oregon
- Industry: Bakery
- Founded: Seattle, Washington (1972)
- Founder: Gwenyth Bassetti
- Number of locations: 11 (2014)
- Area served: Portland, Oregon, and Seattle, Washington
- Number of employees: 225 (2012)
- Website: grandcentralbakery.com

Grand Central Baking Company (d.b.a. Grand Central Bakery) is an independent American bakery chain with 12 locations in Portland, Oregon, and Seattle, Washington, and their metropolitan areas. It was founded in Seattle's Grand Central Hotel building, originally as The Bakery and later becoming Grand Central Bakery. The bakery is known for its artisan breads.

== History ==
Grand Central was founded in 1989 by Gwyneth Bassetti in Seattle, beginning the local artisan bread movement in that city. Her son later opened Grand Central Bakery's first Portland location in 1993 on SE Hawthorne Boulevard. The company has grown to about 370 employees since then. Today, Grand Central Bakery has 12 cafes and two wholesale bakeries in the Portland and Seattle areas. It sells its baked goods in dozens of retailers across the Pacific Northwest.

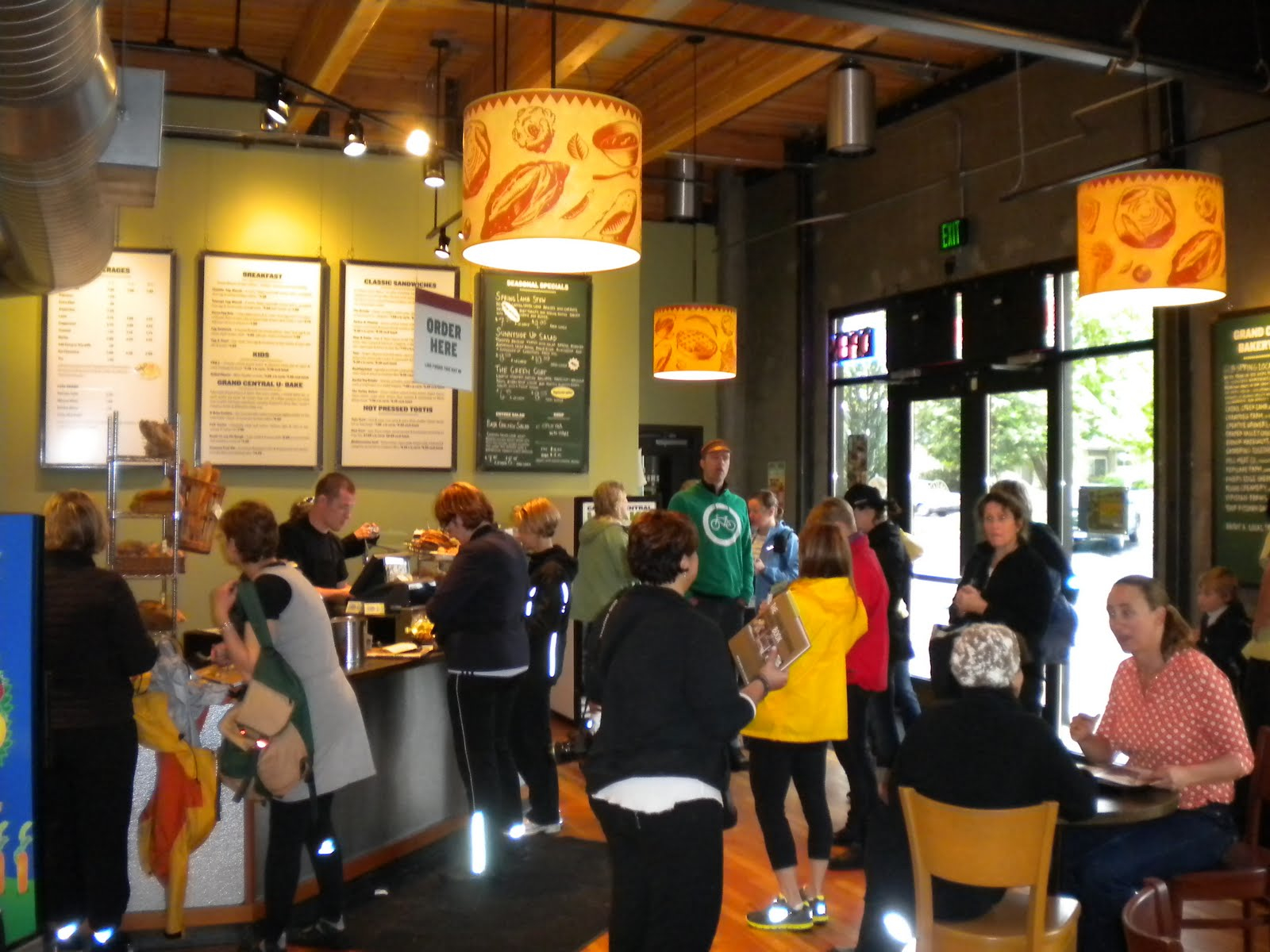
A Grand Central Bakery location in Portland, Oregon

As of June 2018, Claire Randall has been Grand Central's CEO. Grand Central's head baker is Mel Darbyshire, overseeing the company's bread production in Seattle and Portland. In a move designed to shield the 33-year-old company from any future sale and protect its mission in perpetuity, Grand Central Bakery announced plans in May 2022 to create a perpetual purpose trust, a new type of corporate structure. As a purpose trust the bakery will no longer be owned by family and longtime employees but by the trust, which the company says will preserve independence, values, mission and company culture.

== Locations ==
Grand Central has four cafe-bakeries in greater Seattle, in the Eastlake, Wedgwood, and Wallingford neighborhoods, as well is in Burien. In Portland, they have shops in the Hawthorne, Woodstock, Beaumont Village, Multnomah Village, Sellwood, and Mississippi district neighborhoods, as well as in Cedar Mill, an unincorporated area in Northwest Portland, and in Hillsboro, just outside Portland. The Portland wholesale bakery voted to unionize with the Bakery, Confectionery, Tobacco Workers and Grain Millers International Union (BCTGM) Local 114 in 2019 and the union and company have negotiated 2 contracts since, one in 2020, and one in 2021.
