= Woodstock School (Portland, Oregon) =

School in Portland, Oregon, U.S.

Woodstock Elementary School
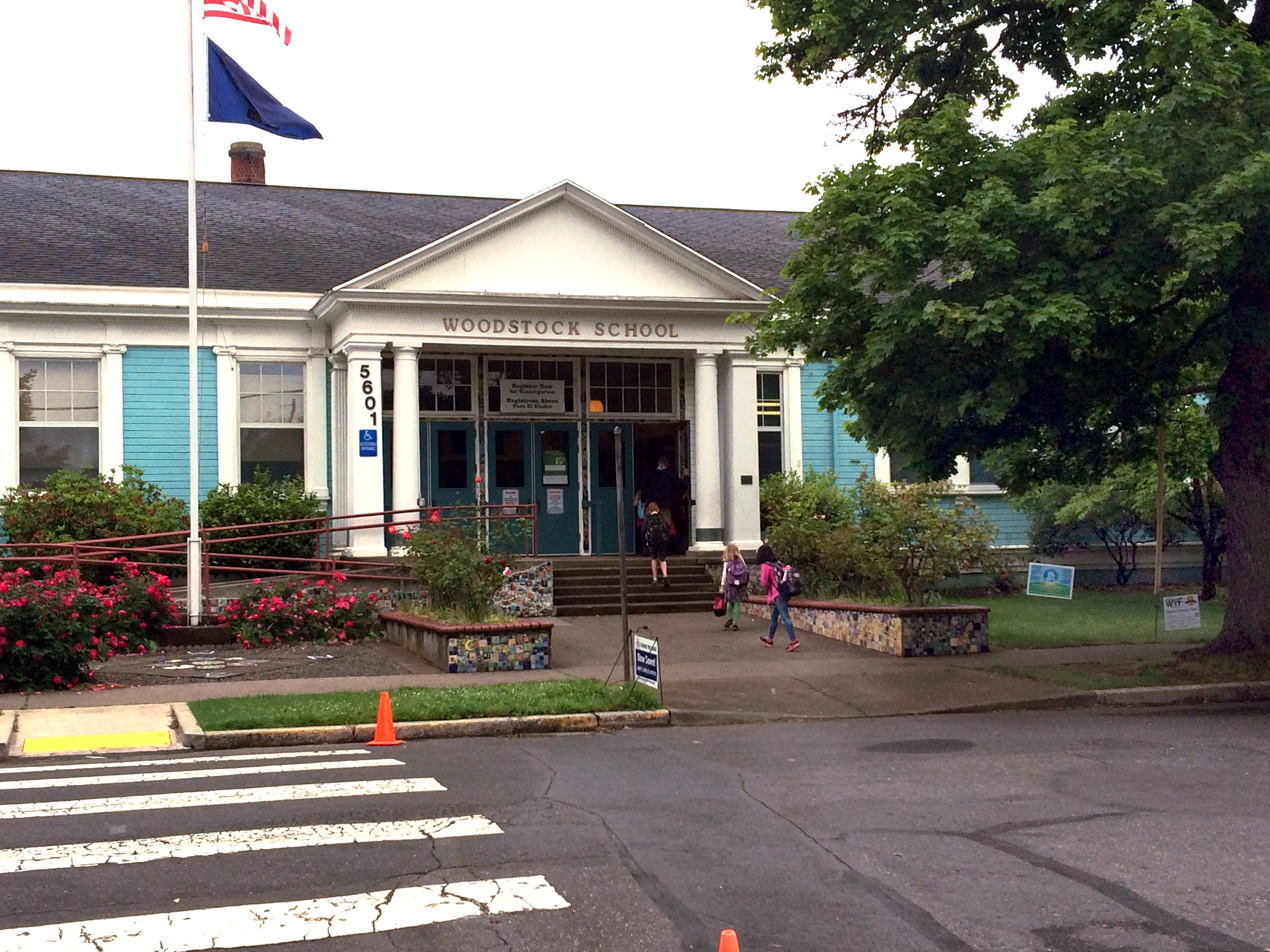
- View of the front entrance of Woodstock Elementary School

Location
- 5601 SE 50th Ave; Portland, OR, 97206; United States; 45.482°N 122.612°W

Information
- Type: Elementary School
- Established: 1891
- School district: Portland Public Schools
- Principal: Seth Johnson
- Grades: K-5
- Enrollment: 528 (22-23)
- Campus type: Suburban
- Feeder to: Lane Middle School; Cleveland High School
- Website: Woodstock Elementary School

Woodstock Elementary School, formerly known as Woodstock School, is an elementary school within Portland Public Schools, located in the Woodstock neighborhood of southeast Portland, Oregon, United States. Established in 1891, the school was housed in a four-room building until it joined School District No. 1 in 1909. The newly constructed two-story, eight-room school opened in 1911 at its current location. The Woodstock School underwent expansions in 1925 and 1955, but a fire in 1980 destroyed the building's two-story center. Protests by Woodstock residents and the Woodstock Parent Teachers Association ended the school district's plans to close the school due to fire damage and low student enrollment throughout the city. The school remained open and underwent repairs, but its second story was lost. The school marks the oldest standing elementary school in Portland.

Programs at Woodstock School include a Mandarin Chinese Immersion program for grades K-5. Students in the Immersion program receive instruction in Mandarin for half the day and English instruction the other half. Of the 492 students attending Woodstock School, two thirds participate in the Immersion program.

== History ==
The Woodstock School was established in 1891 in a four-room building in the center of the Woodstock neighborhood (two blocks north of SE Woodstock Boulevard between Southeast 46th and 47th Avenues). In 1909, the school joined School District No. 1 and 2 acres (0.81 ha) were purchased where the school remains today, resulting in the construction of a two-story building with eight rooms. The school, designed by Thomas J. Jones, was constructed in 1910 and opened in 1911. The first principal was A. J. Prideaux, who held the position until 1945. Woodstock School underwent expansions in 1925 and 1955. The building has been designated a Portland Historic Landmark by the city's Historic Landmarks Commission.

In 1980, when the school was undergoing repairs, a fire started from a worker's torch destroyed the building's two-story wood frame center. The Portland School District proposed closing the school as a result of the fire damage and because of low student enrollment throughout the city. Woodstock residents and members of the Woodstock Parent Teachers Association protested the school's closure; subsequently, the school was repaired in 1981 and remained opened, but without its second story.

== Architecture ==
Woodstock School exhibits Classical Revival architecture; elements include entablature, Tuscan-style corner boards with pilasters, and a water table. The building is roughly E-shaped in form; its primary siding is constructed from horizontal boards. The school's main entrance on Southeast 50th, which divides the building bilaterally, is underneath a portico supported by Doric columns. The building envelope includes vinyl six-over-one double-hung windows with wood frames.

== See also ==
- Primary education in the United States
