= 2001 UEFA Intertoto Cup =

Tournament details
- Dates: 16 June 2001 – 21 August 2001
- Teams: 60

Final positions
- Champions: (England) Aston Villa (France) Paris Saint-Germain (France) Troyes

Tournament statistics
- Matches played: 114
- Goals scored: 351 (3.08 per match)

The 2001 UEFA Intertoto Cup finals were won by Aston Villa, Paris Saint-Germain and Troyes. All three teams advanced to the UEFA Cup.

== First round ==
Team 1	Agg.	Team 2	1st leg	2nd leg
Zagreb (Croatia)	2–3	(North Macedonia) Pobeda	1–2	1–1
Universitatea Craiova (Romania)	4–3	(Albania) Bylis	3–3	1–0
Dyskobolia Grodzisk (Poland)	1–4	(Bulgaria) Spartak Varna	1–0	0–4
Hapoel Haifa (Israel)	5–0	(Estonia) TVMK	2–0	3–0
Ekranas (Lithuania)	2–2 (3–4 p)	(Slovakia) Artmedia Petržalka	1–1	1–1 (a.e.t.)
Tatabánya (Hungary)	5–4	(Armenia) Shirak	2–3	3–1
Zagłębie Lubin (Poland)	4–1	(Malta) Hibernians	4–0	0–1
AGF Aarhus (Denmark)	2–7	(Slovenia) Publikum Celje	1–0	1–7
Dundee (Scotland)	2–5	(Federal Republic of Yugoslavia) Sartid	0–0	2–5
UE Sant Julià (Andorra)	1–9	(Switzerland) Lausanne-Sport	1–3	0–6
Jazz (Finland)	2–2 (a)	(Romania) Gloria Bistrița	1–0	1–2
Anorthosis (Cyprus)	0–9	(Croatia) Slaven Belupo	0–2	0–7
Čelik (Bosnia and Herzegovina)	6–3	(Turkey) Denizlispor	1–0	5–3
WIT Georgia (Georgia (country))	2–2 (a)	(Austria) Ried	1–0	1–2
Carmarthen Town (Wales)	0–3	(Sweden) AIK	0–0	0–3
B68 Toftír (Faroe Islands)	2–4	(Belgium) Lokeren	2–4	0–0
Dinamo Minsk (Belarus)	7–1	(Luxembourg) Hobscheid	6–0	1–1
Tiligul Tiraspol (Moldova)	4–1	(Northern Ireland) Cliftonville	1–0	3–1 (a.e.t.)
Grindavík (Iceland)	3–1	(Azerbaijan) Vilash Masallı	1–0	2–1
Cork City (Republic of Ireland)	1–3	(Latvia) Liepājas Metalurgs	0–1	1–2

=== First leg ===
16 June 2001
18:00

Universitatea Craiova (Romania)	3–3	(Albania) Bylis
Grigorie 8', 81' (pen.); Stancu 10'	Report	Xhafa 44'; Imeraj 69'; Vito 71'

Ion Oblemenco, Craiova
Attendance: 2,000
Referee: Lubomír Puček (Czech Republic)

16 June 2001
17:00

Tatabánya (Hungary)	2–3	(Armenia) Shirak
Peković 7'; Bajkuša 90'	Report	Batikyan 13'; Harutyunyan 74', 84' (pen.)

Városi Stadion, Tatabánya
Attendance: 200
Referee: Jari Maisonlahti (Finland)

16 June 2001
16:00

AGF Aarhus (Denmark)	1–0	(Slovenia) Publikum Celje
Christensen 86'	Report

Århus Idrætspark, Aarhus
Attendance: 1,306
Referee: Karen Nalbandyan (Armenia)

16 June 2001
15:00

Dundee (Scotland)	0–0	(Federal Republic of Yugoslavia) Sartid
	Report

Dens Park, Dundee
Attendance: 6,511
Referee: Tommy Skjerven (Norway)

16 June 2001
18:00

UE Sant Julià (Moldova)	1–3	(Switzerland) Lausanne-Sport
Jiménez Soria 40'	Report	Chaveriat 5'; Simon 9'; Lutsenko 87'

Estadi Comunal d'Andorra la Vella, Andorra la Vella
Attendance: 820
Referee: Vladimir Antonov (Moldova)

16 June 2001
17:00

Anorthosis (Cyprus)	0–2	(Croatia) Slaven Belupo
	Report	Jurčec 37'; Mužek 63'

Antonis Papadopoulos Stadium, Larnaca
Attendance: 640
Referee: Delce Jakimovski (Macedonia)

16 June 2001
18:00

WIT Georgia (Georgia (country))	1–0	(Austria) Ried
Gogoberishvili 50'	Report

Boris Paichadze Stadium, Tbilisi
Attendance: 5,000
Referee: Attila Juhos (Hungary)

16 June 2001
16:00

Carmarthen Town (Wales)	0–0	(Sweden) AIK
	Report

Park Avenue, Aberystwyth
Attendance: 1,624
Referee: Slavko Radulović (FR Yugoslavia)

16 June 2001
17:00

B68 Toftír (Faroe Islands)	2–4	(Belgium) Lokeren
Marcolino 31'; Johannesen 38'	Report	Mputu 10'; El Bodmossi 45', 60'; Kimoto 83'

Svangaskarð, Toftir
Attendance: 350
Referee: Igor Yarmenchuk (Ukraine)

16 June 2001
19:00

Dinamo Minsk (Belarus)	6–0	(Luxembourg) Hobscheid
Kachura 35' (pen.), 58', 86'; Lyadzyanyow 45'; Kavalchuk 79'; Chumachenko 90'	Report

Dinamo Stadium, Minsk
Attendance: 2,530
Referee: Stephen Weatherall (Northern Ireland)

16 June 2001
18:30

Cork City (Republic of Ireland)	0–1	(Latvia) Liepājas Metalurgs
	Report	Katasonov 70'

Turners Cross, Cork
Attendance: 2,900
Referee: Merab Malaguradze (Georgia)

17 June 2001
17:30

Zagreb (Croatia)	1–2	(North Macedonia) Pobeda
Lovrek 9'	Report	Karanfilovski 54'; Georgioski 57'

Stadion Kranjčevićeva, Zagreb
Attendance: 1,000
Referee: Andreas Georgiou (Cyprus)

17 June 2001
17:00

Dyskobolia Grodzisk (Poland)	1–0	(Bulgaria) Spartak Varna
Nuckowski 87'	Report

Dyskobolia Stadium, Grodzisk Wielkopolski
Attendance: 2,500
Referee: Petteri Kari (Finland)

17 June 2001
18:00

Hapoel Haifa (Israel)	2–0	(Estonia) TVMK
Megrelashvili 60'; Hen 88' (pen.)	Report

Kiryat Eliezer Stadium, Haifa
Attendance: 500
Referee: Nikolai Ivanov (Russia)

17 June 2001
17:00

Ekranas (Lithuania)	1–1	(Slovakia) Artmedia Petržalka
Baltušnikas 19'	Report	Kinder 57' (pen.)

Aukštaitija Stadium, Panevėžys
Attendance: 2,500
Referee: Draženko Kovačić (Croatia)

17 June 2001
17:00

Zagłębie Lubin (Poland)	4–0	(Malta) Hibernians
Grzybowski 34', 58'; Manuszewski 40', 90'	Report

Stadion Zagłębia Lubin, Lubin
Attendance: 340
Referee: Gylfi Thór Orrason (Iceland)

17 June 2001
19:00

Jazz (Finland)	1–0	(Romania) Gloria Bistrița
Iliev 40'	Report

Porin Stadion, Pori
Attendance: 1,717
Referee: Grzegorz Gilewski (Poland)

17 June 2001
17:30

Čelik (Bosnia and Herzegovina)	1–0	(Turkey) Denizlispor
Pavić 11'	Report

Bilino Polje, Zenica
Attendance: 5,819
Referee: Attila Ábrahám (Hungary)

17 June 2001
19:00

Tiligul Tiraspol (Moldova)	1–0	(Northern Ireland) Cliftonville
Covalciuc 9' (pen.)	Report

Stadionul Municipal, Tiraspol
Attendance: 4,000
Referee: Anastasios Papaioannou (Cyprus)

17 June 2001
16:00

Grindavík (Iceland)	1–0	(Azerbaijan) Vilash Masallı
Bjarnason 80' (pen.)	Report

Grindavíkurvöllur, Grindavík
Attendance: 950
Referee: Paulius Malžinskas (Lithuania)

=== Second leg ===
23 June 2001
17:30

Bylis (Albania)	0–1	(Romania) Universitatea Craiova
	Report	Grigorie 57'

Qemal Stafa Stadium, Tirana
Attendance: 250
Referee: Ali Aydin (Turkey)

Universitatea Craiova won 4–3 on aggregate.

23 June 2001
16:00

TVMK (Estonia)	0–3	(Israel) Hapoel Haifa
	Report	Tubi 10'; Bitche 70'; Azulay 88' (pen.)

A. Le Coq Arena, Tallinn
Attendance: 500
Referee: Krzysztof Slupik (Poland)

Hapoel Haifa won 5–0 on aggregate.

23 June 2001
17:00

Hibernians (Malta)	1–0	(Poland) Zagłębie Lubin
Chukunyere 12'	Report

Hibernians Ground, Paola
Attendance: 160
Referee: Dejan Delević (FR Yugoslavia)

Zagłębie Lubin won 4–1 on aggregate.

23 June 2001
17:30

Publikum Celje (Slovenia)	7–1	(Denmark) Aarhus GF
Koren 12', 35'; Šumulikoski 14'; Beršnjak 17'; Bogatinov 70'; Jožef 75'; Sivko 89'	Report	Pedersen 25' (pen.)

Skalna Klet, Celje
Attendance: 1,000
Referee: Edgar Sorin Altmayer (Romania)

Celje won 7–2 on aggregate.

23 June 2001
17:30

Sartid (Federal Republic of Yugoslavia)	5–2	(Scotland) Dundee
Mudrinić 17' (pen.), 21' (pen.); Aleksić 38'; Ramović 88'; Krizmanić 90'	Report	Caballero 5'; Sara 60'

Stadion FK Smederevo, Smederevo
Attendance: 16,823
Referee: Svetlozar Marinov (Bulgaria)

Sartid won 5–2 on aggregate.

23 June 2001
19:30

Lausanne-Sport (Switzerland)	6–0	(Andorra) UE Sant Julià
Masudi 24'; Kuźba 45'; Chaveriat 60', 66'; Thiaw 61'; Isaias 81'	Report

Stade Olympique de la Pontaise, Lausanne
Attendance: 1,150
Referee: Meir Levi (Israel)

Lausanne-Sport won 9–1 on aggregate.

23 June 2001
17:00

Gloria Bistrița (Romania)	2–1	(Finland) Jazz
Ceaușu 20'; Popa 77'	Report	Juntunen 59'

Stadionul Gloria, Bistrița
Attendance: 3,000
Referee: Darko Čeferin (Slovenia)

2–2 on aggregate. Jazz won on away goals.

23 June 2001
17:00

Slaven Belupo (Croatia)	7–0	(Cyprus) Anorthosis
Dodik 2', 38', 50', 57'; Kacić 6'; Geršak 45'; Medenjak 67'	Report

Gradski stadion, Koprivnica
Attendance: 2,000
Referee: Jozef Kacenga (Slovakia)

Slaven Belupo won 9–0 on aggregate.

23 June 2001
15:00

AIK (Sweden)	3–0	(Wales) Carmarthen Town
Petrović 28'; P. Andersson 45'; Thylander 83'	Report

Råsunda Stadium, Solna
Attendance: 3,219
Referee: Sergei Goussev (Russia)

AIK won 3–0 on aggregate.

23 June 2001
20:00

Lokeren (Belgium)	0–0	(Faroe Islands) B68 Toftír
	Report

Daknamstadion, Lokeren
Attendance: 1,491
Referee: Sergei Shebek (Ukraine)

Lokeren won 4–2 on aggregate.

23 June 2001
15:00

Cliftonville (Northern Ireland)	1–3 (a.e.t.)	(Moldova) Tiligul Tiraspol
Scannell 11'	Report	Covalciuc 100'; Priganiuc 113'; Ivahnenco 120'

Solitude, Belfast
Attendance: 617
Referee: Joseph Attard (Malta)

Tiligul Tiraspol won 4–1 on aggregate.

23 June 2001
17:00

Liepājas Metalurgs (Latvia)	2–1	(Republic of Ireland) Cork City
Skoblyakov 8', 32'	Report	Morley 85'

Daugava Stadium, Liepāja
Attendance: 2,200
Referee: Kamen Alexiev (Bulgaria)

Liepājas Metalurgs won 3–1 on aggregate.

24 June 2001
17:00

Pobeda (North Macedonia)	1–1	(Croatia) Zagreb
Karanfilovski 17'	Report	Lovrek 20'

Stadion Goce Delčev, Prilep
Attendance: 1,600
Referee: Hubert Byrne (Republic of Ireland)

Pobeda won 3–2 on aggregate.

24 June 2001
17:30

Spartak Varna (Bulgaria)	4–0	(Poland) Dyskobolia Grodzisk
Stanchev 29', 70', 78'; Rusinov 90'	Report

Spartak Stadium, Varna
Attendance: 1,000
Referee: David Malcolm (Northern Ireland)

Spartak Varna won 4–1 on aggregate.

24 June 2001
17:00

Artmedia Petržalka (Slovakia)	1–1 (a.e.t.)	(Lithuania) Ekranas
Šoltis 54'	Report	Lukšys 75'
Penalties
Kinder (penalty scored); Maixner (penalty scored); Sýkora (penalty scored); Kubala (penalty scored)	4–3	(penalty scored) Gardzijauskas; (penalty scored) Kučys; (penalty scored) Stankevičius; (penalty missed) Žudys; (penalty missed) Baltušnikas

Štadión Petržalka, Bratislava
Attendance: 5,361
Referee: Dragan Tripković (FR Yugoslavia)

2–2 on aggregate. Artmedia Petržalka won 4–3 on penalties.

24 June 2001
17:00

Shirak (Armenia)	1–3	(Hungary) Tatabánya
Hakobyan 77'	Report	Schafranek 41'; Véber 44'; Peković 86'

Gyumri City Stadium, Gyumri
Attendance: 1,600
Referee: John Feighery (Republic of Ireland)

Tatabánya won 5–4 on aggregate.

24 June 2001
17:00

Ried (Austria)	2–1	(Georgia (country)) WIT Georgia
Angerschmid 16'; Lauwers 78'	Report	Melkadze 14'

Stadion der Stadt Ried, Ried im Innkreis
Attendance: 771
Referee: Andrejs Sipailo (Latvia)

2–2 on aggregate. WIT Georgia won on away goals.

24 June 2001
19:00

Denizlispor (Turkey)	3–5	(Bosnia and Herzegovina) Čelik
Doğan S. 3'; Turgay 58'; Cumhur 74'	Report	Brkić 10' (pen.), 36', 54'; Tabaković 20'; Pavić 40'

Denizli Atatürk Stadium, Denizli
Attendance: 2,024
Referee: Viorel Anghelinei (Romania)

Čelik won 6–3 on aggregate.

24 June 2001
17:00

Hobscheid (Luxembourg)	1–1	(Belarus) Dinamo Minsk
El Aouad 54'	Report	Valadzyankow 66'

Stade Koericherberg, Hobscheid
Attendance: 185
Referee: Siniša Zrnić (Bosnia and Herzegovina)

Dinamo Minsk won 7–1 on aggregate.

24 June 2001
18:00

Vilash Masallı (Azerbaijan)	1–2	(Iceland) Grindavík
Akhmedov 48'	Report	McShane 13'; Kekić 18'

Tofiq Bahramov Stadium, Baku
Attendance: 6,000
Referee: Milan Mitrovič (Slovenia)

Grindavík won 3–1 on aggregate.

== Second round ==
Team 1	Agg.	Team 2	1st leg	2nd leg
Čelik (Bosnia and Herzegovina)	1–2	(Belgium) Gent	1–0	0–2
Odense (Denmark)	2–4	(Sweden) AIK	2–2	0–2
Paris Saint-Germain (France)	7–1	(Finland) Jazz	3–0	4–1
Basel (Switzerland)	5–0	(Iceland) Grindavík	3–0	2–0
Troyes (France)	7–1	(Georgia (country)) WIT Georgia	6–0	1–1
Sturm Graz (Austria)	3–4	(Switzerland) Lausanne-Sport	0–1	3–3
Liepājas Metalurgs (Latvia)	4–8	(Netherlands) Heerenveen	3–2	1–6
Slaven Belupo (Croatia)	2–0	(France) Bastia	1–0	1–0
Pobeda (North Macedonia)	4–1	(Turkey) Rizespor	2–1	2–0
1860 Munich (Germany)	6–3	(Federal Republic of Yugoslavia) Sartid	3–1	3–2
Synot (Czech Republic)	5–4	(Romania) Universitatea Craiova	3–2	2–2
Spartak Varna (Bulgaria)	2–5	(Ukraine) Tavriya Simferopol	0–3	2–2
Tiligul Tiraspol (Moldova)	1–5	(Hungary) Tatabánya	1–1	0–4
Publikum Celje (Slovenia)	6–1	(Slovakia) Artmedia Petržalka	5–0	1–1
Dinamo Minsk (Belarus)	3–0	(Israel) Hapoel Haifa	2–0	1–0
Zagłębie Lubin (Poland)	3–4	(Belgium) Lokeren	2–2	1–2

=== First leg ===
30 June 2001
20:00

Čelik (Bosnia and Herzegovina)	1–0	(Belgium) Gent
Tabaković 32'	Report

Bilino Polje, Zenica
Attendance: 10,000
Referee: Wolfgang Sowa (Austria)

30 June 2001
20:00

Troyes (France)	6–0	(Georgia (country)) WIT Georgia
Méniri 16'; Boutal 30', 40', 68'; Goussé 48'; Đukić 60'	Report

Stade Abbé Deschamps, Auxerre
Attendance: 2,000
Referee: Alon Yefet (Israel)

30 June 2001
20:00

Sturm Graz (Austria)	0–1	(Switzerland) Lausanne-Sport
	Report	Masudi 64'

Arnold Schwarzenegger-Stadium, Graz
Attendance: 5,650
Referee: Sten Kaldma (Estonia)

30 June 2001
17:00

Slaven Belupo (Croatia)	1–0	(France) Bastia
Dodik 7'	Report

Gradski stadion, Koprivnica
Attendance: 3,500
Referee: Franz-Xaver Wack (Germany)

30 June 2001
18:00

Pobeda (North Macedonia)	2–1	(Turkey) Rizespor
Krstev 28'; Ristovski 66'	Report	Taner 41'

Stadion Goce Delčev, Prilep
Attendance: 6,000
Referee: Karel Vidlák (Czech Republic)

1 July 2001
15:00

Odense (Denmark)	2–2	(Sweden) AIK
Andersen 35'; Hemmingsen 68'	Report	Tjernström 16'; Wänstrand-Björk 33'

Odense Idrætspark, Odense
Attendance: 2,069
Referee: Imankhan Sultani (Azerbaijan)

1 July 2001
18:00

Paris Saint-Germain (France)	3–0	(Finland) Jazz
Robert 44', 57', 67'	Report

Stadium Municipal, Toulouse
Attendance: 3,789
Referee: Ivan Novak (Croatia)

1 July 2001
15:00

Basel (Switzerland)	3–0	(Iceland) Grindavík
Magro 4'; Tchouga 18'; Tum 60'	Report

St. Jakob-Park, Basel
Attendance: 6,843
Referee: Yuri Klyuchnikov (Russia)

1 July 2001
18:00

Liepājas Metalurgs (Latvia)	3–2	(Netherlands) Heerenveen
Tatarchuk 45'; Katasonov 52' (pen.), 72'	Report	Lurling 6', 51'

Daugava Stadium (Liepāja), Latvia
Attendance: 3,800
Referee: Ladislav Gadoši (Slovakia)

1 July 2001
15:00

1860 Munich (Germany)	3–1	(Federal Republic of Yugoslavia) Sartid
Max 19', 60'; Riseth 66'	Report	Vasković 67'

Rosenaustadion, Augsburg
Attendance: 4,800
Referee: Alexandru Tudor (Romania)

1 July 2001
16:30

Synot (Czech Republic)	3–2	(Romania) Universitatea Craiova
Trousil 45', 68'; Blaha 65'	Report	Crăciunescu 51'; Grigorie 70'

Stadion Širůch, Staré Město
Attendance: 1,150
Referee: Manfred Schüttengruber (Austria)

1 July 2001
18:30

Spartak Varna (Bulgaria)	0–3	(Ukraine) Tavriya Simferopol
Petrov 10' (pen.); Stanchev 68'	Report

Spartak Stadium, Varna
Attendance: 3,000
Referee: Johny Ver Eecke (Belgium)

Tavriya Simferopol were awarded a 3–0 win after Spartak Varna had fielded an ineligible player.

1 July 2001
18:00

Tiligul Tiraspol (Moldova)	1–1	(Hungary) Tatabánya
Priganiuc 68'	Report	Tüske 81'

Stadionul Municipal, Tiraspol
Attendance: 3,000
Referee: António Manuel Almeida Costa (Portugal)

1 July 2001
18:00

Publikum Celje (Slovenia)	5–0	(Slovakia) Artmedia Petržalka
Bogatinov 13', 68'; Lungu 30'; Gobec 84'; Gorenak 90'	Report

Skalna Klet, Celje
Attendance: 541
Referee: Kristinn Jakobsson (Iceland)

30 June 2001
19:00

Dinamo Minsk (Belarus)	2–0	(Israel) Hapoel Haifa
Lyadzyanyow 36', 78'	Report

Dinamo Stadium, Minsk
Attendance: 2,603
Referee: Stefan Messner (Austria)

1 July 2001
18:00

Zagłębie Lubin (Poland)	2–2	(Belgium) Lokeren
Grzybowski 44'; Żuraw 70'	Report	De Beule 80'; Kimoto 88'

Stadion Zagłębia Lubin, Lubin
Attendance: 1,000
Referee: Emil Bozinovski (Macedonia)

=== Second leg ===
7 July 2001
20:00

Gent (Belgium)	2–0	(Bosnia and Herzegovina) Čelik
Bradarić 22', 82' (o.g.)	Report

Jules Ottenstadion, Ghent
Attendance: 3,471
Referee: Vasily Melnichuk (Ukraine)

Gent won 2–1 on aggregate.

7 July 2001
17:00

AIK (Sweden)	2–0	(Denmark) Odense
Hoch 28'; Wänstrand-Björk 71'	Report

Råsunda Stadium, Solna
Attendance: 4,076
Referee: Frank De Bleeckere (Belgium)

AIK won 4–2 on aggregate.

7 July 2001
18:00

Jazz (Finland)	1–4	(France) Paris Saint-Germain
Juntunen 52'	Report	Okocha 20', 60' (pen.); Robert 32'; Hiroux 73'

Porin Stadion, Pori
Attendance: 3,803
Referee: Spiridon Papadakos (Greece)

Paris Saint-Germain won 7–1 on aggregate.

7 July 2001
19:30

Lausanne-Sport (Switzerland)	3–3	(Austria) Sturm Graz
Masudi 36'; Isaias 61'; Kuźba 69'	Report	Vastić 40' (pen.); Haas 77', 86'

Stade Olympique de la Pontaise, Lausanne
Attendance: 1,600
Referee: Oleg Chikun (Belarus)

Lausanne-Sport won 4–3 on aggregate.

7 July 2001
19:30

Heerenveen (Netherlands)	6–1	(Latvia) Liepājas Metalurgs
Jensen 7'; Talan 10'; Allbäck 52', 75', 82'; Lurling 86' (pen.)	Report	Dobrecovs 5'

Abe Lenstra Stadion, Heerenveen
Attendance: 12,300
Referee: Martin Hansson (Sweden)

Heerenveen won 8–4 on aggregate.

7 July 2001
20:00

Bastia (France)	0–1	(Croatia) Slaven Belupo
	Report	Dodik 12'

Stade Armand Cesari, Bastia
Attendance: 3,660
Referee: Petteri Kari (Finland)

Slaven Belupo won 2–0 on aggregate.

7 July 2001
17:00

Rizespor (Turkey)	0–2	(North Macedonia) Pobeda
	Report	Krstev 5'; Gjokić 90'

Rize Atatürk Stadium, Rize
Attendance: 951
Referee: Ferenc Bede (Hungary)

Pobeda won 4–1 on aggregate.

7 July 2001
17:30

Sartid (Federal Republic of Yugoslavia)	2–3	(Germany) 1860 Munich
Bogdanović 29'; Mudrinić 48' (pen.)	Report	Max 11'; Ipoua 72'; Cerny 87'

Stadion FK Smederevo, Smederevo
Attendance: 12,088
Referee: Mustafa Çulcu (Turkey)

1860 Munich won 6–3 on aggregate.

7 July 2001
18:00

Universitatea Craiova (Romania)	2–2	(Czech Republic) Synot
Savu 60'; Grigorie 83'	Report	Malár 12'; Hlahůlek 40'

Ion Oblemenco, Craiova
Attendance: 2,500
Referee: Georgios Douros (Greece)

Synot won 5–4 on aggregate.

7 July 2001
17:00

Tatabánya (Hungary)	4–0	(Moldova) Tiligul Tiraspol
Peković 63' (pen.); Letenyei 71'; Nagy 80'; Tüske 90+2'	Report

Városi Stadion, Tatabánya
Attendance: 400
Referee: Tonny Kolbech Poulsen (Denmark)

Tatabánya won 5–1 on aggregate.

7 July 2001
20:00

Lokeren (Belgium)	2–1	(Poland) Zagłębie Lubin
Grétarsson 41' (pen.); Kimoto 52'	Report	Vonášek 65' (o.g.)

Daknamstadion, Lokeren
Attendance: 1,204
Referee: Sokol Jareci (Albania)

Lokeren won 4–3 on aggregate.

8 July 2001
20:00

WIT Georgia (Georgia (country))	1–1	(France) Troyes
Melkadze 89'	Report	Goussé 81'

Boris Paichadze Stadium, Tbilisi
Attendance: 1,500
Referee: Dimitar Dimitrov (Bulgaria)

Troyes won 7–1 on aggregate.

8 July 2001
16:00

Grindavík (Iceland)	0–2	(Switzerland) Basel
	Report	Muff 14', 80'

Grindavíkurvöllur, Grindavík
Attendance: 700
Referee: Zbigniew Marczyk (Poland)

Basel won 5–0 on aggregate.

8 July 2001
19:00

Tavriya Simferopol (Ukraine)	2–2	(Bulgaria) Spartak Varna
Gigiadze 23'; Khomenko 45'	Report	Stanchev 70'; Adekunle 83'

Lokomotiv Stadium, Simferopol
Attendance: 10,000
Referee: Markus Nobs (Switzerland)

Tavriya Simferopol won 5–2 on aggregate.

8 July 2001
18:00

Artmedia Petržalka (Slovakia)	1–1	(Slovenia) Publikum Celje
Sulejmanović 31' (o.g.)	Report	Bogatinov 36' (pen.)

Štadión Petržalka, Bratislava
Attendance: 1,895
Referee: John R. Underhill (Scotland)

Celje won 6–1 on aggregate.

8 July 2001
17:30

Hapoel Haifa (Israel)	0–1	(Belarus) Dinamo Minsk
	Report	Kachura 17'

Kiryat Eliezer Stadium, Haifa
Attendance: 1,500
Referee: Nikolaos Angelakis (Greece)

Dinamo Minsk won 3–0 on aggregate.

== Third round ==
Team 1	Agg.	Team 2	1st leg	2nd leg
Lokeren (Belgium)	0–5	(England) Newcastle United	0–4	0–1
Chmel Blšany (Czech Republic)	1–0	(North Macedonia) Pobeda	0–0	1–0
Rennes (France)	7–4	(Czech Republic) Synot	5–0	2–4
Slaven Belupo (Croatia)	2–3	(England) Aston Villa	2–1	0–2
RKC Waalwijk (Netherlands)	2–5	(Germany) 1860 Munich	1–2	1–3
Wolfsburg (Germany)	4–3	(Belarus) Dinamo Minsk	4–3	0–0
Werder Bremen (Germany)	3–3 (a)	(Belgium) Gent	2–3	1–0
Brescia (Italy)	3–2	(Hungary) Tatabánya	2–1	1–1
Troyes (France)	4–2	(Sweden) AIK	2–1	2–1
Tavriya Simferopol (Ukraine)	0–5	(France) Paris Saint-Germain	0–1	0–4
Basel (Switzerland)	5–3	(Netherlands) Heerenveen	2–1	3–2
Publikum Celje (Slovenia)	1–1 (a)	(Switzerland) Lausanne-Sport	1–1	0–0

=== First leg ===
14 July 2001
20:00

Lokeren (Belgium)	0–4	(England) Newcastle United
	Report	Quinn 13'; Ameobi 23', 39'; LuaLua 86'

Daknamstadion, Lokeren
Attendance: 2,425
Referee: Fernando Carmona Méndez (Spain)

14 July 2001
17:00

Chmel Blšany (Czech Republic)	0–0	(North Macedonia) Pobeda
	Report

FK Chmel Blšany, Blšany
Attendance: 1,000
Referee: Julian Rodriguez Santiago (Spain)

14 July 2001
20:30

Brescia (Italy)	2–1	(Hungary) Tatabánya
Salgado 22'; Guana 30'	Report	Tüske 33'

Stadio Mario Rigamonti, Brescia
Attendance: 5,676
Referee: Metin Tokat (Turkey)

14 July 2001
17:00

Slaven Belupo (Croatia)	2–1	(England) Aston Villa
Crnac 61'; Geršak 89'	Report	Ginola 87'

Gradski stadion, Koprivnica
Attendance: 3,000
Referee: Massimo De Santis (Italy)

14 July 2001
20:00

Wolfsburg (Germany)	4–3	(Belarus) Dinamo Minsk
Juskowiak 4', 60'; Petrov 34'; Akonnor 38'	Report	Kachura 6' (pen.), 81'; Lyadzyanyow 69'

VfL-Stadion am Elsterweg, Wolfsburg
Attendance: 4,600
Referee: Peter Fröjdfeldt (Sweden)

14 July 2001
17:30

Werder Bremen (Germany)	2–3	(Belgium) Gent
Aílton 27', 83'	Report	Oyawolé 58', 72'; Anić 87'

Marschweg-Stadion, Oldenburg
Attendance: 5,547
Referee: Zsolt Szabó (Hungary)

14 July 2001
18:00

Publikum Celje (Slovenia)	1–1	(Switzerland) Lausanne-Sport
Beršnjak 70'	Report	Margairaz 78'

Skalna Klet, Celje
Attendance: 800
Referee: Laurent Duhamel (France)

14 July 2001
19:30

Basel (Switzerland)	2–1	(Netherlands) Heerenveen
Koumantarakis 12'; H. Yakin 20'	Report	Nurmela 56'

St. Jakob-Park, Basel
Attendance: 8,059
Referee: José Mendes Pratas (Portugal)

15 July 2001
14:30

RKC Waalwijk (Netherlands)	1–2	(Germany) 1860 Munich
Van der Berg 19'	Report	Häßler 44'; Max 72'

Mandemakers Stadion, Waalwijk
Attendance: 4,500
Referee: Andy D'Urso (England)

15 July 2001
18:00

Rennes (France)	5–0	(Czech Republic) Synot
Monterrubio 19', 58'; Lucas 55'; Piquionne 85', 90'	Report

Stade de la Route de Lorient, Rennes
Attendance: 12,438
Referee: Steve Bennett (England)

15 July 2001
18:00

Troyes (France)	2–1	(Sweden) AIK
Goussé 55', 80'	Report	Åslund 70'

stade Abbé Deschamps, Auxerre
Attendance: 2,539
Referee: Željko Širić (Croatia)

15 July 2001
19:00

Tavriya Simferopol (Ukraine)	0–1	(France) Paris Saint-Germain
	Report	Heinze 56'

Lokomotiv Stadium, Simferopol
Attendance: 18,000
Referee: Dick van Egmond (Netherlands)

=== Second leg ===
21 July 2001
19:00

Newcastle United (England)	1–0	(Belgium) Lokeren
Bellamy 60'	Report

St James' Park, Newcastle upon Tyne
Attendance: 29,021
Referee: Edgar Steinborn (Germany)

Newcastle United won 5–0 on aggregate.

21 July 2001
17:00

Pobeda (North Macedonia)	0–1	(Czech Republic) Chmel Blšany
	Report	Velkoborský 71'

Stadion Goce Delčev, Prilep
Attendance: 10,000
Referee: Philippe Leuba (Switzerland)

Chmel Blšany won 1–0 on aggregate.

21 July 2001
16:30

Synot (Czech Republic)	4–2	(France) Rennes
Polách 11'; Soldán 24' (pen.); Blaha 62', 90'	Report	Chapuis 21'; Arribagé 66'

Stadion Širůch, Staré Město
Attendance: 1,510
Referee: Olegário Benquerença (Portugal)

Rennes won 7–4 on aggregate.

21 July 2001
15:00

Aston Villa (England)	2–0	(Croatia) Slaven Belupo
Hendrie 18', 40'	Report

Villa Park, Birmingham
Attendance: 27,580
Referee: Georgios Borovilos (Greece)

Aston Villa won 3–2 on aggregate.

21 July 2001
15:30

1860 Munich (Germany)	3–1	(Netherlands) RKC Waalwijk
Wiesinger 22'; Häßler 77'; Max 90'	Report	Van Loenhout 37'

Rosenaustadion, Augsburg
Attendance: 3,500
Referee: Andreas Schluchter (Switzerland)

1860 Munich won 5–2 on aggregate.

21 July 2001
19:00

Dinamo Minsk (Belarus)	0–0	(Germany) Wolfsburg
	Report

Dinamo Stadium, Minsk
Attendance: 7,890
Referee: Bruno Coué (France)

Wolfsburg won 4–3 on aggregate.

21 July 2001
20:00

Gent (Belgium)	0–1	(Germany) Werder Bremen
	Report	Herzog 83' (pen.)

Jules Ottenstadion, Ghent
Attendance: 4,800
Referee: Cosimo Bolognino (Italy)

3–3 on aggregate. Gent won on away goals.

21 July 2001
19:30

Tatabánya (Hungary)	1–1	(Italy) Brescia
Kincses 66'	Report	Guana 41'

Hidegkuti Nándor Stadium, Budapest
Attendance: 567
Referee: Hermann Albrecht (Germany)

Brescia won 3–2 on aggregate.

21 July 2001
17:00

AIK (Sweden)	1–2	(France) Troyes
Alm 66'	Report	Thomas 36'; Boutal 72'

Råsunda Stadium, Solna
Attendance: 5,328
Referee: Michal Beneš (Czech Republic)

Troyes won 4–2 on aggregate.

21 July 2001
18:00

Paris Saint-Germain (France)	4–0	(Ukraine) Tavriya Simferopol
Okocha 4'; Aloísio 10', 70'; Benarbia 62'	Report

Stadium Municipal, Toulouse
Attendance: 2,037
Referee: Víctor José Esquinas Torres (Spain)

Paris Saint-Germain won 5–0 on aggregate.

21 July 2001
19:30

Heerenveen (Netherlands)	2–3	(Switzerland) Basel
Allbäck 4'; Lurling 75'	Report	Koumantarakis 10'; H. Yakin 24'; Tum 69'

Abe Lenstra Stadion, Heerenveen
Attendance: 13,300
Referee: Stéphane Moulin (France)

Basel won 5–3 on aggregate.

21 July 2001
19:30

Lausanne-Sport (Switzerland)	0–0	(Slovenia) Publikum Celje
	Report

Stade Olympique de la Pontaise, Lausanne
Attendance: 1,450
Referee: Paul Allaerts (Belgium)

1–1 on aggregate. Lausanne-Sport won on away goals.

== Semi-finals ==
Team 1	Agg.	Team 2	1st leg	2nd leg
Rennes (France)	2–2 (a)	(England) Aston Villa	2–1	0–1
Gent (Belgium)	1–7	(France) Paris Saint-Germain	0–0	1–7
Chmel Blšany (Czech Republic)	3–4	(Italy) Brescia	1–2	2–2
Basel (Switzerland)	5–2	(Switzerland) Lausanne-Sport	3–0	2–2
1860 Munich (Germany)	3–6	(England) Newcastle United	2–3	1–3
Troyes (France)	3–2	(Germany) Wolfsburg	1–0	2–2

=== First leg ===
25 July 2001
20:00

Rennes (France)	2–1	(England) Aston Villa
Lucas 19'; Chapuis 66'	Report	Vassell 90'

Stade de la Route de Lorient, Rennes
Attendance: 15,753
Referee: Lucílio Batista (Portugal)

25 July 2001
18:00

Gent (Belgium)	0–0	(France) Paris Saint-Germain
	Report

Jules Ottenstadion, Ghent
Attendance: 5,000
Referee: Vladimír Hriňák (Slovakia)

25 July 2001
17:00

Chmel Blšany (Czech Republic)	1–2	(Italy) Brescia
Laibl 89'	Report	Del Nero 57'; Filippini 83'

FK Chmel Blšany, Blšany
Attendance: 3,000
Referee: Costas Kapitanis (Cyprus)

25 July 2001
19:30

Basel (Switzerland)	3–0	(Switzerland) Lausanne-Sport
Giménez 19', 21'; H. Yakin 45'	Report

St. Jakob-Park, Basel
Attendance: 14,872
Referee: Ferenc Bede (Hungary)

25 July 2001
19:45

1860 Munich (Germany)	2–3	(England) Newcastle United
Agostino 56'; Tapalović 66'	Report	Solano 10', 55'; Hughes 84'

Olympiastadion, Munich
Attendance: 12,000
Referee: Stéphane Bré (France)

25 July 2001
19:00

Troyes (France)	1–0	(Germany) Wolfsburg
Goussé 8'	Report

Stade de l'Aube, Troyes
Attendance: 5,643
Referee: René Temmink (Netherlands)

=== Second leg ===
1 August 2001
19:45

Aston Villa (England)	1–0	(France) Rennes
Dublin 5'	Report

Villa Park, Birmingham
Attendance: 30,000
Referee: Wolfgang Stark (Germany)

2–2 on aggregate. Aston Villa won on away goals.

1 August 2001
20:00

Paris Saint-Germain (France)	7–1	(Belgium) Gent
Arteta 11'; Mendy 35'; Anelka 45', 63'; Okocha 56' (pen.), 60'; Hiroux 89'	Report	Kraouche 72'

Parc des Princes, Paris
Attendance: 29,149
Referee: Steve Bennett (England)

Paris Saint-Germain won 7–1 on aggregate.

1 August 2001
20:30

Brescia (Italy)	2–2	(Czech Republic) Chmel Blšany
Tare 33'; Filippini 74'	Report	Velkoborský 1'; Pazdera 60'

Stadio Mario Rigamonti, Brescia
Attendance: 7,000
Referee: Sorin Corpodean (Romania)

Brescia won 4–3 on aggregate.

1 August 2001
16:30

Lausanne-Sport (Switzerland)	2–2	(Switzerland) Basel
Thiaw 8', 45'	Report	Tum 18'; Varela 62'

Stade Olympique de la Pontaise, Lausanne
Attendance: 2,050
Referee: Vasily Melnichuk (Ukraine)

Basel won 5–2 on aggregate.

1 August 2001
20:45

Newcastle United (England)	3–1	(Germany) 1860 Munich
Speed 5'; LuaLua 80'; Solano 90' (pen.)	Report	Schroth 42'

St James' Park, Newcastle upon Tyne
Attendance: 36,635
Referee: Yuri Baskakov (Russia)

Newcastle United won 6–3 on aggregate.

1 August 2001
20:00

Wolfsburg (Germany)	2–2	(France) Troyes
Petrov 22'; Biliškov 35'	Report	Amzine 29'; Rothen 90'

VfL-Stadion am Elsterweg, Wolfsburg
Attendance: 4,829
Referee: Georgios Douros (Greece)

Troyes won 3–2 on aggregate.

== Finals ==
Team 1	Agg.	Team 2	1st leg	2nd leg
Basel (Switzerland)	2–5	(England) Aston Villa	1–1	1–4
Paris Saint-Germain (France)	1–1 (a)	(Italy) Brescia	0–0	1–1
Troyes (France)	4–4 (a)	(England) Newcastle United	0–0	4–4

=== First leg ===
7 August 2001
19:30

Basel (Switzerland)	1–1	(England) Aston Villa
Giménez 74'	Report	Merson 58'

St. Jakob-Park, Basel
Attendance: 25,879
Referee: Eric Romain (Belgium)

7 August 2001
20:30

Paris Saint-Germain (France)	0–0	(Italy) Brescia
	Report

Parc des Princes, Paris
Attendance: 35,000
Referee: Mike McCurry (Scotland)

7 August 2001
20:00

Troyes (France)	0–0	(England) Newcastle United
	Report

Stade de l'Aube, Troyes
Attendance: 10,414
Referee: Tom Henning Øvrebø (Norway)

=== Second leg ===
21 August 2001
19:45

Aston Villa (England)	4–1	(Switzerland) Basel
Vassell 45'; Ángel 55', 78'; Ginola 84'	Report	Chipperfield 30'

Villa Park, Birmingham
Attendance: 39,513
Referee: Claus Bo Larsen (Denmark)

Aston Villa won 5–2 on aggregate.

21 August 2001
20:15

Brescia (Italy)	1–1	(France) Paris Saint-Germain
Baggio 79' (pen.)	Report	Aloísio 74'

Stadio Mario Rigamonti, Brescia
Attendance: 23,000
Referee: Juan Antonio Fernández (Spain)

1–1 on aggregate. Paris Saint-Germain won on away goals.

21 August 2001
20:45

Newcastle United (England)	4–4	(France) Troyes
Solano 2'; Ameobi 65'; Speed 70' (pen.); Hughes 90'	Report	Leroy 25'; Goussé 27'; Boutal 46', 61'

St James' Park, Newcastle upon Tyne
Attendance: 36,577
Referee: Fiorenzo Treossi (Italy)

4–4 on aggregate. Troyes won on away goals.

== Statistics ==
=== Top goalscorers ===
Rank	Name	Team	Goals
1	(Bosnia and Herzegovina) Marijo Dodik	(Croatia) Slaven Belupo	6
1	(France) Samuel Boutal	(France) Troyes	6
1	(France) Nicolas Goussé	(France) Troyes	6
4	(Belarus) Pyotr Kachura	(Belarus) Dinamo Minsk	5
4	(Bulgaria) Valentin Stanchev	(Bulgaria) Spartak Varna	5
4	(Germany) Martin Max	(Germany) 1860 Munich	5
4	(Nigeria) Jay-Jay Okocha	(France) Paris Saint-Germain	5
4	(Romania) Ștefan Grigorie	(Romania) Universitatea Craiova	5
9	(France) Laurent Robert	(France) Paris Saint-Germain	4
9	(Netherlands) Anthony Lurling	(Netherlands) Heerenveen	4
9	(Sweden) Marcus Allbäck	(Netherlands) Heerenveen	4
9	(Peru) Nolberto Solano	(England) Newcastle United	4

== UEFA Cup performance ==
The three winners (Aston Villa, Paris Saint-Germain and Troyes) entered the competition at the first round, bypassing the qualifying round. The Villa were drawn against Croatian side NK Varteks, but lost 3–2 in the first round at Villa Park. Varteks took the lead through Saša Bjelanović just before half time, but Colombian Juan Pablo Ángel equalised in the second half. Veldin Karić restored the away side's lead just after the hour mark, before Ángel equalised again less than five minutes later. A second from Bjelanović five minutes from time remained unanswered, however. In the second leg at the Stadion Varteks, the only goal came in second half stoppage time, from Moroccan Mustapha Hadji, who brought the Villans level in the tie, but the Croatians still progressed on away goals.

Meanwhile, PSG had been drawn against Rapid București of Romania. The first leg at the Parc des Princes ended goalless, but controversy ensued in the second leg. With scores still level after ninety minutes, the match went to extra time, with les Parisiens taking a lead three minutes into the extra period through Brazilian Aloísio. However, with about five minutes of extra time to play, the lights in the Stadionul Giulești-Valentin Stănescu failed, and the match had to be abandoned. As PSG had been leading at the time, they were awarded the match, and therefore progressed to the next round.

Fellow French team Troyes had a first round tie against MFK Ružomberok of Slovakia. They took a commanding 6–1 victory in the first leg the Stade de l'Aube, including a hat-trick by Samuel Boutal and one goal apiece from Patrice Loko and Algerian Mehdi Méniri. They were also helped by an own goal from Tibor Zátek, while Ruža did manage to get one at the right end through substitute Marián Kurty. The second leg was therefore just a formality, and Ružomberok's 1–0 win, which came thanks to a goal from Tomáš Oravec, was totally meaningless.

Troyes were then drawn against English side Leeds United in the second round, and had to travel away for the first leg to Elland Road. The Whites got a perfect start, taking the lead after just five minutes through Australian Mark Viduka, and Lee Bowyer added a second less than 20 minutes later. However, Troyes hit back, and Loko scored on the half hour mark. In the second half, Viduka and Bowyer added one more each shortly after half time, but Loko's second ten minutes from the end gave Troyes hope for the second leg. When the game at the Stade de l'Aube arrived, it was the French team's turn to have the perfect start, with Moroccan Gharib Amzine striking after eight minutes. Viduka scored his third goal of the tie on the quarter-hour mark, but David Hamed put Troyes back in the lead on the night before half time. Just before the hour mark, Jérôme Rothen levelled the tie at 5–5 on aggregate, but Troyes' two goals at Elland Road meant that they would go through on away goals. However, Irishman Robbie Keane broke French hearts with his goal 12 minutes from time, putting Leeds through 6–5 on aggregate.

PSG, meanwhile, had a much easier first leg against Austrian side Rapid Wien. They won comfortably 4–0 at the Parc des Princes, with two goals from Brazilian Ronaldinho and one apiece for Bernard Mendy and Nicolas Anelka. Die Grün-Weißen put up a little more of a fight at the Gerhard Hanappi Stadium, taking a 2–0 lead thanks to an early brace from Czech forward René Wagner. However, second half goals from Lionel Potillon and, in injury time, Portuguese midfielder Hugo Leal ensured a dominant 6–2 aggregate victory.

PSG were therefore the only remaining Intertoto Cup side in the competition at the third round, where they faced Scottish side Rangers. They played out two 0–0 draws, first at the Ibrox Stadium, then at the Parc des Princes, leaving les Parisiens with the small advantage of taking penalties on home ground. After five penalties apiece, each side had missed two (Nigerian Jay-Jay Okocha and Argentine Gabriel Heinze for PSG, Dutchman Bert Konterman and Heinze's countryman Claudio Caniggia for the Gers). In the sixth round of penalties, Barry Ferguson put the Blues ahead, meaning that a third Argentine, Mauricio Pochettino, had to score to keep his team in the game. However, the centre back's penalty crashed against the crossbar, and PSG were out.

== Highest Attendance ==
Aston Villa's attendance of 39,513 versus Basel at Villa Park on 21 August 2001, represented the highest attendance for any Intertoto fixture that season.

== See also ==
- 2001–02 UEFA Champions League
