= 2002 UEFA European Under-19 Championship squads =

Player listings in youth football competition

Players born on or after 1 January 1983 were eligible to participate in the tournament. Players' age as of 21 July 2002 – the tournament's opening day. Players in bold have later been capped at full international level.

== Group A ==
=== Czech Republic ===
Head Coach : (Czech Republic) Josef Krejča

No.	Pos.	Player	Date of birth (age)	Caps	Goals	Club
1	GK	Michal Daněk	6 July 1983 (aged 19)			(Football Association of the Czech Republic) Baník Ostrava
2	DF	Ondřej Král	17 April 1983 (aged 19)			(Football Association of the Czech Republic) Viktoria Plzeň
3	DF	Milan Zachariáš	1 October 1983 (aged 18)			(Football Association of the Czech Republic) Slavia Prague B
4	MF	Martin Kolář	18 September 1983 (aged 18)			(Football Association of the Czech Republic) Bohemians
5	DF	Radek Dosoudil	20 June 1983 (aged 19)			(Football Association of the Czech Republic) Sparta Prague
6	DF	**David Limberský**	6 October 1983 (aged 18)			(Football Association of the Czech Republic) Viktoria Plzeň
7	FW	Pavel Fořt	26 June 1983 (aged 19)			(Football Association of the Czech Republic) Viktoria Plzeň
8	FW	**Václav Svěrkoš**	1 November 1983 (aged 18)			(Football Association of the Czech Republic) Baník Ostrava
9	MF	Pavel Mezlík	25 June 1983 (aged 19)			(Football Association of the Czech Republic) Brno
10	MF	**Tomáš Sivok**	15 September 1983 (aged 18)			(Football Association of the Czech Republic) Sparta Prague
11	DF	David Mikula	30 March 1983 (aged 19)			(Football Association of the Czech Republic) SFC Opava
12	GK	**Petr Čech**	20 May 1982 (aged 20)			(Football Association of the Czech Republic) Škoda Plzeň
13	MF	Filip Trojan	21 February 1983 (aged 19)			(German Football Association) Schalke 04
14	DF	Tomáš Rada	28 September 1983 (aged 18)			(Football Association of the Czech Republic) Sparta Prague
15	FW	David Střihavka	4 March 1983 (aged 19)			(Football Association of the Czech Republic) Jablonec
16	GK	Aleš Kořínek	9 January 1983 (aged 19)			(Football Association of the Czech Republic) Zlín
17	MF	Lukáš Vaculík	6 June 1983 (aged 19)			(Football Association of the Czech Republic) Vysočina Jihlava
18	MF	Aleš Besta	10 April 1983 (aged 19)			(Football Association of the Czech Republic) Baník Ostrava

=== Norway ===
Head couch : (Norway) Bjørn Hansen

No.	Pos.	Player	Date of birth (age)	Caps	Goals	Club
1	GK	Jan Kjell Larsen	24 June 1983 (aged 19)			(Norwegian Football Federation) Haugesund
2	DF	Vegar Landro	21 February 1983 (aged 19)			(Norwegian Football Federation) Brann
3	DF	Lars Martin Engedal	11 September 1983 (aged 18)			(Norwegian Football Federation) Start
4	MF	**Christian Grindheim**	17 July 1983 (aged 19)			(Norwegian Football Federation) Haugesund
5	DF	Kristian Flittie Onstad	9 May 1984 (aged 18)			(Norwegian Football Federation) Lyn
6	DF	Torbjørn Kjerrgård	11 April 1983 (aged 19)			(Norwegian Football Federation) Brann
7	MF	**Kristofer Hæstad**	9 December 1983 (aged 18)			(Norwegian Football Federation) Start
8	FW	Martin Wiig	22 August 1983 (aged 18)			(Norwegian Football Federation) Odd Grenland
9	MF	Tarjei Dale	4 January 1983 (aged 19)			(Norwegian Football Federation) Odd Grenland
10	MF	Joakim Austnes	20 February 1983 (aged 19)			(Norwegian Football Federation) Aalesund
11	FW	Øyvind Hoås	28 October 1983 (aged 18)			(Norwegian Football Federation) Molde
12	GK	**Rune Jarstein**	29 September 1984 (aged 17)			(Norwegian Football Federation) Herkules
13	MF	Tor Erik Moen	3 October 1983 (aged 18)			(Norwegian Football Federation) Rosenborg
14	DF	Dag Martin Tverborgvik	22 February 1983 (aged 19)			(Norwegian Football Federation) Haugesund
15	DF	Steinar Guvåg	8 August 1983 (aged 18)			(Norwegian Football Federation) Molde
16	FW	Eirik Winsnes	26 February 1983 (aged 19)			(Norwegian Football Federation) Rosenborg
17	DF	Per Verner Vågan Rønning	9 January 1983 (aged 19)			(Norwegian Football Federation) Levanger
18	MF	**Trond Olsen**	5 February 1984 (aged 18)			(Norwegian Football Federation) Lyngen/Karnes

=== Slovakia ===
Head Coach : (Slovakia) Peter Polák

No.	Pos.	Player	Date of birth (age)	Caps	Goals	Club
1	GK	Peter Kostoláni	6 February 1983 (aged 19)			(Slovak Football Association) Nitra
2	DF	Marek Kostoláni	6 February 1983 (aged 19)			(Slovak Football Association) Nitra
3	DF	Igor Hrabáč	18 November 1983 (aged 18)			(Football Association of the Czech Republic) Sparta Prague B
4	MF	Marián Kurty	13 May 1983 (aged 19)			(Slovak Football Association) Ružomberok
5	DF	**Marek Čech**	26 January 1983 (aged 18)			(Slovak Football Association) Inter Bratislava
6	DF	Roman Konečný	25 July 1983 (aged 18)			(Slovak Football Association) Spartak Trnava
7	FW	**Juraj Halenár**	28 June 1983 (aged 19)			(Slovak Football Association) Inter Bratislava
8	FW	**Filip Šebo**	25 February 1984 (aged 18)			(German Football Association) 1. FC Köln
9	FW	Roman Jurko	25 January 1983 (aged 19)			(Slovak Football Association) Slovan Bratislava
10	MF	Tomáš Labun	28 January 1984 (aged 18)			(Royal Belgian Football Association) Cercle Brugge
11	FW	Tomás Sloboda	24 September 1983 (aged 18)			(Slovak Football Association) Slovan Bratislava
12	GK	Milan Herko	27 February 1983 (aged 19)			(Slovak Football Association) Slovan Bratislava
13	MF	Tomáš Bruško	21 February 1983 (aged 19)			(Ukrainian Association of Football) Dynamo Kyiv
14	DF	Peter Šedivý	5 January 1983 (aged 19)			(Slovak Football Association) Inter Bratislava
15	FW	**Marek Bakoš**	15 April 1983 (aged 19)			(Slovak Football Association) Nitra
16	MF	**Milan Ivana**	26 November 1983 (aged 18)			(Slovak Football Association) Trenčín
17	MF	Dusan Miklas	7 February 1983 (aged 19)			(Slovak Football Association) Trenčín
18	MF	**Igor Žofčák**	10 April 1983 (aged 19)			(Slovak Football Association) Ružomberok

=== Spain ===
Head Coach : (Spain) Iñaki Sáez

No.	Pos.	Player	Date of birth (age)	Caps	Goals	Club
1	GK	Miguel Ángel Moyà	2 April 1984 (aged 18)			(Royal Spanish Football Federation) Mallorca
2	DF	Iban Zubiaurre	22 January 1983 (aged 19)			(Royal Spanish Football Federation) Real Sociedad
3	DF	Carlos Peña	28 July 1983 (aged 18)			(Royal Spanish Football Federation) Barcelona
4	MF	Carmelo González	9 July 1983 (aged 19)			(Royal Spanish Football Federation) Las Palmas
5	DF	Ander Murillo (c)	26 July 1983 (aged 18)			(Royal Spanish Football Federation) Athletic Bilbao
6	MF	Aritz Solabarrieta	22 July 1983 (aged 18)			(Royal Spanish Football Federation) Athletic Bilbao
7	DF	Dani Jarque	1 January 1983 (aged 19)			(Royal Spanish Football Federation) Espanyol
8	FW	**Fernando Torres**	20 March 1984 (aged 18)			(Royal Spanish Football Federation) Atlético Madrid
9	MF	**Andrés Iniesta**	11 May 1984 (aged 18)			(Royal Spanish Football Federation) Barcelona
10	FW	**Sergio García**	9 June 1983 (aged 19)			(Royal Spanish Football Federation) Barcelona
11	FW	**José Antonio Reyes**	1 September 1983 (aged 18)			(Royal Spanish Football Federation) Sevilla
12	MF	Jorge Pina	28 February 1983 (aged 19)			(Royal Spanish Football Federation) Real Zaragoza
13	GK	Asier Riesgo	1 August 1983 (aged 18)			(Royal Spanish Football Federation) Real Sociedad
14	DF	Juan Carlos Ceballos	7 April 1983 (aged 19)			(Royal Spanish Football Federation) Espanyol
15	FW	Ferran Corominas	5 January 1983 (aged 19)			(Royal Spanish Football Federation) Espanyol
16	MF	Sergio Torres	2 March 1984 (aged 18)			(Royal Spanish Football Federation) Atlético Madrid
17	MF	Jonan García	8 January 1983 (aged 19)			(Royal Spanish Football Federation) Athletic Bilbao
18	DF	Melli	6 June 1984 (aged 18)			(Royal Spanish Football Federation) Real Betis

== Group B ==
=== Belgium ===
Head Coach : (Belgium) Marc Van Geersom

No.	Pos.	Player	Date of birth (age)	Caps	Goals	Club
1	GK	Bram Verbist	5 May 1983 (aged 19)			(Royal Dutch Football Association) Ajax
2	DF	Kenny van Hoevelen	24 June 1983 (aged 19)			(Royal Belgian Football Association) Westerlo
3	DF	Stijn Vangeffelen	8 January 1983 (aged 19)			(Royal Belgian Football Association) Sint-Truiden
4	MF	Koen Van Der Heyden	4 January 1983 (aged 19)			(Royal Belgian Football Association) Eendracht Aalst
5	DF	Pieterjan Monteyne	1 January 1983 (aged 19)			(Royal Belgian Football Association) Germinal Beerschot
6	DF	**Xavier Chen**	5 October 1983 (aged 18)			(Royal Belgian Football Association) Anderlecht
7	MF	Denis Dasoul	20 July 1983 (aged 19)			(Italian Football Federation) Perugia
8	FW	**Kevin Vandenbergh**	16 May 1983 (aged 19)			(Royal Belgian Football Association) Club Brugge
9	FW	Tony Eecloo	10 August 1983 (aged 18)			(Royal Belgian Football Association) Mechelen
10	DF	**Jelle Van Damme**	10 October 1983 (aged 18)			(Royal Belgian Football Association) Germinal Beerschot
11	MF	**Jonathan Blondel**	3 April 1984 (aged 18)			(Royal Belgian Football Association) Mouscron
12	GK	**Silvio Proto**	23 May 1983 (aged 19)			(Royal Belgian Football Association) La Louviére
13	DF	Arne Houtekier	30 June 1983 (aged 19)			(Royal Belgian Football Association) Zulte-Waregem
14	DF	Xavier Asselborn	10 March 1983 (aged 19)			(Royal Belgian Football Association) Standard Liège
15	FW	Styn Janssens	21 April 1983 (aged 19)			(Royal Belgian Football Association) Lierse
16	MF	Rory Hegelmeers	4 April 1983 (aged 19)			(Royal Belgian Football Association) K.V. Mechelen
17	MF	Sebastian Hermans	3 May 1983 (aged 19)			(Royal Belgian Football Association) Club Brugge
18	MF	Gregory Scattone	4 February 1983 (aged 19)			(Royal Belgian Football Association) Germinal Beerschot

=== England ===
Head Coach: (England) Martin Hunter

No.	Pos.	Player	Date of birth (age)	Caps	Goals	Club
1	GK	Lee Grant	27 January 1983 (aged 19)			(The Football Association) Derby County
2	DF	**Justin Hoyte**	20 November 1984 (aged 17)			(The Football Association) Arsenal
3	DF	Ryan Garry	29 September 1983 (aged 18)			(The Football Association) Arsenal
4	MF	**Jermaine Jenas**	18 February 1983 (aged 19)			(The Football Association) Newcastle United
5	DF	**Glen Johnson**	23 August 1984 (aged 17)			(The Football Association) West Ham United
6	DF	Ben Clark	24 January 1983 (aged 19)			(The Football Association) Sunderland
7	MF	Jermaine Pennant	16 January 1983 (aged 19)			(The Football Association) Arsenal
8	FW	Michael Chopra	23 December 1983 (aged 18)			(The Football Association) Newcastle United
9	FW	**Dean Ashton**	24 November 1983 (aged 18)			(The Football Association) Crewe Alexandra
10	FW	**Carlton Cole**	1 November 1983 (aged 18)			(The Football Association) Chelsea
11	MF	Gary O'Neil	18 May 1983 (aged 19)			(The Football Association) Portsmouth
12	DF	Jon Otsemobor	23 March 1983 (aged 19)			(The Football Association) Liverpool
13	GK	Andrew Lonergan	19 October 1983 (aged 18)			(The Football Association) Preston North End
14	MF	Jerome Thomas	23 March 1983 (aged 19)			(The Football Association) Arsenal
15	MF	Stephen Cooke	15 February 1983 (aged 19)			(The Football Association) Bournemouth
16	MF	John Welsh	10 January 1984 (aged 18)			(The Football Association) Liverpool
17	MF	Ben Bowditch	19 February 1984 (aged 18)			(The Football Association) Tottenham Hotspur
18	MF	Darren Carter	18 December 1983 (aged 18)			(The Football Association) Birmingham City

=== Germany ===
Head Coach: (Germany) Uli Stielike

No.	Pos.	Player	Date of birth (age)	Caps	Goals	Club
1	GK	Daniel Haas	1 August 1983 (aged 18)			(German Football Association) Eintracht Frankfurt
2	DF	Moritz Volz	21 January 1983 (aged 19)			(The Football Association) Arsenal
3	DF	Alexander Meyer	19 October 1983 (aged 18)			(German Football Association) Bayer Leverkusen
4	MF	Matthias Lehmann	28 May 1983 (aged 19)			(German Football Association) VfB Stuttgart
5	MF	Benjamin Wingerter	25 March 1983 (aged 19)			(German Football Association) Schalke 04
6	DF	**Philipp Lahm**	11 November 1983 (aged 18)			(German Football Association) Bayern Munich
7	DF	**Per Mertesacker**	29 September 1984 (aged 17)			(German Football Association) Hannover 96
8	FW	**Mike Hanke**	5 November 1983 (aged 18)			(German Football Association) Schalke 04
9	FW	**David Odonkor**	21 February 1984 (aged 18)			(German Football Association) Borussia Dortmund
10	MF	**Piotr Trochowski**	22 March 1984 (aged 18)			(German Football Association) Bayern Munich
11	FW	Ioannis Masmanidis	9 March 1983 (aged 19)			(German Football Association) Bayer Leverkusen
12	GK	Bastian Görrissen	19 July 1983 (aged 19)			(German Football Association) VfL Bochum
13	MF	**Sascha Riether**	23 March 1983 (aged 19)			(German Football Association) SC Freiburg
14	DF	Janis Crone	25 February 1983 (aged 19)			(German Football Association) 1860 Munich
15	FW	Emmanuel Krontiris	11 February 1983 (aged 19)			(German Football Association) Borussia Dortmund
16	DF	**Malik Fathi**	29 October 1983 (aged 18)			(German Football Association) Hertha BSC
17	FW	Marcel Schied	28 July 1983 (aged 18)			(German Football Association) Hansa Rostock
18	MF	**Sofian Chahed**	18 April 1983 (aged 19)			(German Football Association) Hertha BSC

=== Republic of Ireland ===
Head Coach : (Republic of Ireland) Brian Kerr

No.	Pos.	Player	Date of birth (age)	Caps	Goals	Club
1	GK	Brian Murphy	7 March 1983 (aged 19)			(The Football Association) Manchester City
2	DF	Stephen Brennan	20 March 1983 (aged 19)			(The Football Association) Newcastle United
3	DF	**Stephen Kelly**	6 September 1983 (aged 18)			(The Football Association) Tottenham Hotspur
4	MF	Graham Ward	25 February 1983 (aged 19)			(The Football Association) Wolverhampton Wanderers
5	DF	Paddy McCarthy	31 May 1983 (aged 19)			(The Football Association) Manchester City
6	MF	Stephen Capper	28 February 1983 (aged 19)			(The Football Association) Sunderland
7	DF	Stephen Paisley	28 July 1983 (aged 18)			(The Football Association) Manchester City
8	FW	**Stephen Elliott**	6 January 1984 (aged 18)			(The Football Association) Manchester City
9	FW	Mark Rossiter	27 May 1983 (aged 19)			(The Football Association) Sunderland
10	FW	Reinier Moor	12 June 1983 (aged 19)			(The Football Association) Exeter City
11	MF	Sean Thornton	18 May 1983 (aged 19)			(The Football Association) Tranmere Rovers
12	MF	Michael Foley	9 March 1983 (aged 19)			(The Football Association) Liverpool
13	MF	Keith Gilroy	18 July 1983 (aged 19)			(The Football Association) Middlesbrough
14	DF	Ian Simpemba	28 March 1983 (aged 19)			(The Football Association) Wycombe Wanderers
15	FW	Jon Daly	8 January 1983 (aged 19)			(The Football Association) Stockport County
16	GK	**Wayne Henderson**	16 September 1983 (aged 18)			(The Football Association) Aston Villa
17	MF	Adrian Deane	24 February 1983 (aged 19)			(The Football Association) Charlton Athletic
18	MF	Liam Kearney	10 January 1983 (aged 19)			(The Football Association) Nottingham Forest
