= 1992–93 in Bosnia and Herzegovina football =

The 1992-1993 season in Bosnia and Herzegovina was not held due to Bosnian war.

The Bosnian Serbs team FK Borac Banja Luka played in First League of FR Yugoslavia and based in FR Yugoslavia.

== Football transfer ==
Date	Name	Moving from	Moving to	Fee	Ref.
	Haris Alihodžić	Željezničar	(Austria) Favoritner AC		
	Mario Bazina	Velež	(Croatia) Hajduk Split		
	Elvedin Beganović	Čelik	(Germany) Remscheid		
	Ekrem Bradarić	Sloboda Tuzla	(Croatia) Rijeka		
	Aleksandar Bratić	Leotar	(Serbia and Montenegro) Hajduk Kula		
	Muhamed Konjić	Sloboda Tuzla	(Croatia) Belišće		
	Tomislav Piplica	(Croatia) Istra	(Croatia) Segesta		
	Hasan Salihamidžić	Velež	(Germany) Hamburg		
