= Ramović =

Ramović is a Bosnian surname. Notable people with the surname include:

- Demir Ramović (born 1982), retired Montenegrin footballer
- Džejla Ramović (born 2002), Bosnian singer, winner of Zvezde Granda
- Sead Ramović (born 1979), retired Bosnian footballer
- Sinan Ramović (born 1992), Bosnian footballer
