= Colinet =

Colinet may refer to:

- Colinet, Newfoundland and Labrador, Canada
- Colinet de Lannoy (died circa 1497), French composer
- Marie Colinet (circa 1560-1640), midwife-surgeon
- Jérôme Colinet (born 1983) Belgian footballer
