= Bradarić =

Bradarić (Serbo-Croatian pronunciation: [brǎdaritɕ]) is a Bosnian and Croatian surname. Notable people with the surname include:

- Ekrem Bradarić (born 1969), former Bosnian professional footballer
- Filip Bradarić (born 1992), Croatian professional footballer
- Domagoj Bradarić (born 1999), Croatian footballer
