= Nicolas Goussé =

French footballer (born 1976)

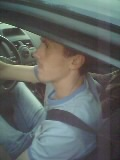

Personal information
- Full name: Nicolas Goussé
- Date of birth: 2 January 1976 (age 50)
- Place of birth: Thouars, France
- Position: Forward

Youth career
- Thouars Foot 79

Senior career*
Years	Team	Apps	(Gls)
1995–1996	Thouars		
1996–1999	Rennes	69	(15)
1999–2000	Metz	23	(1)
2000–2003	Troyes	93	(30)
2003–2004	Guingamp	22	(4)
2004–2005	Mons	25	(8)
2005–2007	Istres	34	(6)
2007–2009	Nantes	30	(10)
2009–2011	Évian	35	(9)
- * Club domestic league appearances and goals

Nicolas Goussé (born 2 January 1976) is a French former professional footballer who played as a forward who is the assistant coach of Ligue 2 club Annecy.

== Career ==
Goussé was born in Thouars, France. He helped Troyes become one of the winners of the 2001 UEFA Intertoto Cup. In the final Troyes beat Newcastle United on away goals after the second leg finished 4–4 at St James' Park; Goussé scored one of Troyes' goals.

He joined Evian Thonon Gaillard in January 2009.

== Honours ==
Troyes

- UEFA Intertoto Cup: 2001
