= Aritz Solabarrieta =

Spanish footballer (born 1983)

Personal information
- Full name: Aritz Solabarrieta Aranzamendi
- Date of birth: 22 July 1983 (age 43)
- Place of birth: Ondarroa, Spain
- Height: 1.90 m (6 ft 3 in)
- Position: Midfielder

Youth career
- 1995–1996: Zubi Zahar
- 1996–2001: Athletic Bilbao

Senior career*
Years	Team	Apps	(Gls)
2001–2002	Basconia	31	(4)
2002–2004	Bilbao Athletic	66	(5)
2004–2006	Athletic Bilbao	11	(0)
2005–2006	→ Eibar (loan)	27	(0)
2007–2008	Atlético Madrid B	48	(1)
2008–2010	Jaén	70	(6)
2010–2011	Palencia	36	(2)
2011–2012	Melilla	29	(1)
2012–2013	Sestao	36	(1)
2013–2015	Aurrerá		
Total		354	(20)

International career
1999–2000	Spain U16	3	(0)
2001	Spain U17	4	(0)
2002	Spain U19	5	(0)
2003	Spain U20	2	(0)
2004	Spain U21	2	(0)

Managerial career
- 2016–2018: Athletic Bilbao (youth)
- 2018: Basconia
- 2018–2019: Bilbao Athletic
- 2020–2021: Racing Santander
- 2024–2025: Calahorra B
- * Club domestic league appearances and goals

Aritz Solabarrieta Aranzamendi (born 22 July 1983) is a Spanish former professional footballer who played mainly as a right midfielder, currently a manager.

== Club career ==
Born in Ondarroa, Basque Country and a product of Athletic Bilbao's prolific youth ranks at Lezama, Solabarrieta played only one full season for its first team, 2004–05, helping with 11 matches as the Basques finished ninth. His La Liga debut came on 13 November 2004 in a 2–1 home win against Villarreal CF, as he came on as a substitute for Andoni Iraola in injury time.

Following a loan with neighbours SD Eibar of Segunda División, which ended in relegation, Solabarrieta was released by the Lions in December 2006 and resumed his career in the Segunda División B, starting with Atlético Madrid B. He retired in June 2015 at the age of 32, after two years with amateurs CD Aurrerá Ondarroa in his hometown.

== International career ==
Solabarrieta won 16 caps for Spain at youth level, including two for the under-21 side. His first appearance for the latter occurred on 17 August 2004, as he featured 22 minutes in a 1–1 friendly draw in France.

== Coaching career ==
After his playing days ended, Solabarrieta embarked on a career as a coach. In 2016, he was appointed as manager of Athletic Bilbao's Cadete A youth team. The following year, he moved to control the Juvenil A squad.

Due to a combination of a disappointing campaign for the CD Basconia farm team coached by Ander Alaña and Solabarrieta's good work with the youths, the two men swapped roles within the club's structure for 2018–19. However, he was soon promoted again when Gaizka Garitano, coach of the reserve side, was selected to take the helm of the senior team in December 2018, in turn leaving a vacancy at Athletic Bilbao B which Solabarrieta was nominated to fill.

Solabarrieta signed as coach of third-tier Racing de Santander on 21 December 2020.

== Managerial statistics ==
As of 22 May 2021

Managerial record by team and tenure
Team	Nat	From	To	Record								Ref
Team	Nat	From	To	G	W	D	L	GF	GA	GD	Win %	Ref
Basconia	(Spain)	21 June 2018	4 December 2018	15	5	5	5	22	19	+3	33.33	
Bilbao Athletic	(Spain)	4 December 2018	22 May 2019	23	10	5	8	38	29	+9	43.48	
Racing Santander	(Spain)	21 December 2020	26 May 2021	19	9	3	7	31	25	+6	47.37	
Career total				57	24	13	20	91	73	+18	42.11	—

== Honours ==
Spain U17

- UEFA–CAF Meridian Cup: 2001

Spain U19

- UEFA European Under-19 Championship: 2002
