= Ander Alaña =

Spanish footballer

Personal information
- Full name: Ander Alaña Puerta
- Date of birth: 20 November 1981 (age 44)
- Place of birth: Bilbao, Spain
- Height: 1.82 m (6 ft 0 in)
- Position: Centre-back

Youth career
- Athletic Bilbao

Senior career*
Years	Team	Apps	(Gls)
1999–2000	Basconia	33	(3)
2000–2003	Bilbao Athletic	95	(3)
2003–2009	Eibar	129	(7)
2009–2010	Poli Ejido	15	(2)
2010–2011	Alavés	42	(0)
2011–2013	Amorebieta	49	(6)
2013–2015	Leioa	50	(2)

Managerial career
- 2016–2017: Athletic Bilbao (youth)
- 2017–2018: Basconia
- 2018–2022: Athletic Bilbao (youth)
- * Club domestic league appearances and goals

Ander Alaña Puerta (born 20 November 1981) is a Spanish former footballer who played as a central defender, currently a manager.

== Playing career ==
Born in Bilbao, Biscay, Basque Country, Alaña graduated from Athletic Bilbao's youth system at Lezama, and made his senior debut with the farm team in 1999–2000, in the Tercera División. He was promoted to the reserves in July 2000, going on to compete in three Segunda División B seasons with the side before being released in June 2003.

In the summer of 2003, Alaña joined neighbouring club SD Eibar. He appeared in his first game as a professional on 14 September 2003, starting in a 0–0 Segunda División home draw against Córdoba CF.

Alaña scored his first goal in the second tier on 7 February 2004, closing the 1–1 draw with Recreativo de Huelva also at the Ipurua Municipal Stadium. He played 26 matches during the campaign, helping to a tenth-place finish.

Alaña made an average of roughly 22 appearances per year (he also missed most of 2005–06 due to injury), being released by the Armeros on 24 June 2009. He subsequently resumed his career mostly in division three, representing Polideportivo Ejido, Deportivo Alavés, SD Amorebieta and SD Leioa. He also helped the last club win promotion to that level in 2014.

== Coaching career ==
In July 2017, one year after working as a coach with Athletic's youths, Alaña was appointed head coach of their third team Basconia. After a poor season in which they barely escaped relegation, he was replaced in the role by Aritz Solabarrieta but remained with the club, taking charge of the under-15 squad.

== Managerial statistics ==
As of 5 December 2018

Managerial record by team and tenure
Team	Nat	From	To	Record								Ref
Team	Nat	From	To	G	W	D	L	GF	GA	GD	Win %	Ref
Basconia	(Spain)	19 July 2017	21 June 2018	38	10	13	15	49	46	+3	26.32	
Career total				38	10	13	15	49	46	+3	26.32	—
