= Stevan Peković =

Montenegrin basketball player (born 1970)

Personal information
- Born: 13 July 1970 (age 56) Titograd, SR Montenegro, Yugoslavia
- Listed height: 2.01 m (6 ft 7 in)

Career information
- NBA draft: 1992: undrafted
- Playing career: 1988–2009
- Position: Small forward / shooting guard
- Number: 7, 8, 9, 10, 11, 13, 14

Career history
- 1990–1992: Budućnost
- 1992–1993: Lovćen
- 1994–1997: Borovica
- 1997–1998: Budućnost
- 1998–1999: Crvena zvezda
- 1999–2001: Hemofarm
- 2001–2002: Crvena zvezda
- 2002–2003: NIS Vojvodina
- 2006–2008: Železničar Inđija
- 2009: Griffon Simferopol

Stevan Peković (born 13 July 1970) is a Montenegrin former professional basketball player.

== Professional career ==
A small forward, Peković played for Lovćen, Borovica, Budućnost, Crvena zvezda, Hemofarm, NIS Vojvodina, and Ukrainian team Griffon Simferopol.

== Career achievements ==
- Yugoslav Cup winner: 1 (with Budućnost: 1997–98)

== Personal life ==
His younger brother Dejan Peković (born 1973) is a Montenegrin former professional footballer.
