= Olivier Thomas =

French footballer (born 1974)

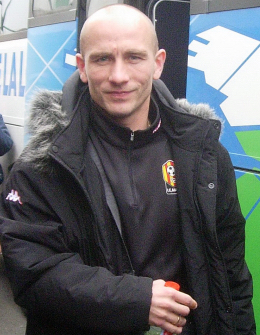
- Thomas in 2012

Personal information
- Date of birth: 6 October 1974 (age 52)
- Place of birth: Paris, France
- Height: 1.83 m (6 ft 0 in)
- Position: Defender

Senior career*
Years	Team	Apps	(Gls)
1992–1993	Nancy		
1999–2001	La-Chapelle-Saint-Luc		
2001–2003	Troyes	46	(2)
2003–2007	Le Mans	125	(0)
2007–2008	Nantes	29	(0)
2008–2009	Sochaux	4	(0)
2009	Ajaccio	0	(0)
- * Club domestic league appearances and goals

Olivier Thomas (born 6 October 1974) is a French former professional footballer who played as a defender.

== Career ==
Thomas was born in Saint-Denis, Paris. He counts Le Mans, Nancy, Troyes, Nantes and Ajaccio as his former clubs.

After his playing career, he was chief scout at his former club Le Mans for ten years before becoming sports coordinator there in July 2026.

== Honours ==
Troyes

- UEFA Intertoto Cup: 2001
