= Samuel Boutal =

French footballer (born 1969)

Personal information
- Date of birth: 22 November 1969 (age 56)
- Place of birth: Bordeaux, France
- Height: 1.80 m (5 ft 11 in)
- Positions: Striker; attacking midfielder

Senior career*
Years	Team	Apps	(Gls)
1993–1994	Pau FC		
1994–1997	Res Star	95	(23)
1997–1999	Caen	67	(19)
1999–2002	Troyes	80	(14)
2002–2003	Kilmarnock	3	(1)
2003	Shanghai Cosco		(-)
2003–2005	Reims	62	(7)
2005–2007	Tours	14	(0)
- * Club domestic league appearances and goals

Samuel Boutal (born 22 November 1969) is a French former professional footballer who played as a striker or attacking midfielder.

Boutal helped Troyes become one of the winners of the 2001 UEFA Intertoto Cup. In the final Troyes beat Newcastle United on away goals after the second leg finished 4–4 at St James' Park; Boutal scored two of Troyes' goals.

Boutal had a brief spell at Scottish side Kilmarnock, joining them in 2002. He scored on his debut against Dundee but was released in January 2003 after no further goals.

== Honours ==
Troyes

- UEFA Intertoto Cup: 2001
