= Jérôme Colinet =

Belgian footballer

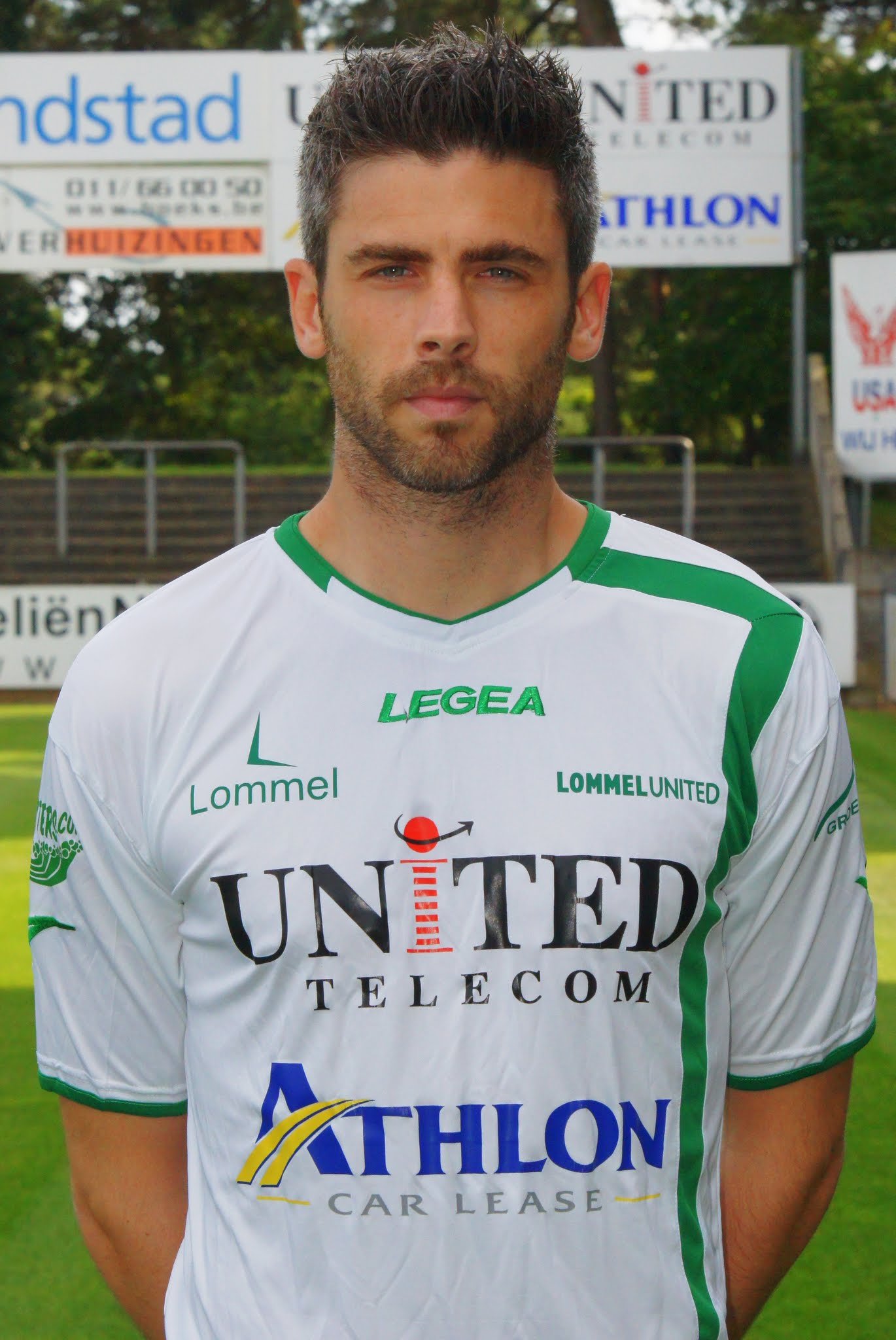

Personal information
- Date of birth: 26 April 1983 (age 43)
- Place of birth: Dinant, Belgium
- Height: 1.83 m (6 ft 0 in)
- Position: Midfielder

Team information
- Current team: RFC Seraing (U19 head coach)

Youth career
- Standard Liège

Senior career*
| Years | Team | Apps | (Gls) |
| 2003–2006 | Roda JC | 24 | (3) |
| 2006–2007 | SC Paderborn 07 | 15 | (0) |
| 2007–2008 | K.V. Mechelen | 4 | (0) |
| 2008 | Namur | 13 | (0) |
| 2008–2011 | Eupen | 67 | (3) |
| 2011–2013 | Lommel United | 38 | (0) |
| 2013–2014 | Sprimont Comblain | 24 | (0) |
| 2014–2017 | RFC Huy | | |
| 2017–2018 | RUW Ciney | | |

International career
| –2002 | Belgium U19 | | |
| –2006 | Belgium U21 | | |

Managerial career
- 2019–: RFC Seraing (U19)
- * Club domestic league appearances and goals

Jérôme Colinet (born 26 April 1983 in Dinant) is a retired Belgian footballer and current head coach of RFC Seraing's U19 squad.

== Biography ==
Colinet had played for Standard Liège in youth level before started his professional career at Roda JC, where he played a few matches at Eredivisie. In summer 2006, he signed a two-year contract with Paderborn of 2. Bundesliga. In May 2007, he terminated his contract in mutual consent. He then played for K.V. Mechelen in the Belgian First Division. He played four matches and left for Namur in January 2008.

He then played for Eupen in the Belgian Second Division.

Colinet had played at 2002 UEFA European Under-19 Championship qualifying and also played at 2006 UEFA European Under-21 Football Championship qualification.

== Coaching career ==
In April 2017, Colinet joined RUW Ciney where he also would be a part of the coaching team. In October 2018, he decided to hang op his boots.

On 19 August 2019, Colinet was appointed U19 head coach of RFC Seraing alongside his role as provincial coordinator for Associations des Clubs Francophones de Football (ACFF).
