= Tomáš Labun =

Slovak footballer

Personal information
- Full name: Tomáš Labun
- Date of birth: 28 January 1984 (age 42)
- Place of birth: Humenné, Czechoslovakia
- Height: 1.84 m (6 ft 1/2 in)
- Positions: Midfielder; centre back

Team information
- Current team: MŠK Rimavská Sobota
- Number: 10

Youth career
- 1.FC Košice

Senior career*
Years	Team	Apps	(Gls)
2002–2004	Cercle Brugge	25	(0)
2004–2005	1.FC Košice		
2005–2006	Humenné		
2006–2007	Matador Púchov		
2007–2008	MFK Košice		
2008–2009	Râmnicu Vâlcea (loan)		
2009	Humenné	?	(3)
2009	Zemplín Michalovce		
2010	LAFC Lučenec	15	(3)
2011	Bodva Moldava nad Bodvou	25	(5)
2012–2014	Tatran Liptovský Mikuláš	28	(7)
2013–2014	→ Rimavská Sobota (loan)	2	(0)
2014–2015	Lokomotíva Košice	44	(19)

International career
- Slovakia U19
- Slovakia U21
- * Club domestic league appearances and goals as of 13 Dec 2015

Tomáš Labun (born 28 January 1984 in Humenné) is a Slovak football player who currently plays for MŠK Rimavská Sobota, on loan from MFK Tatran Liptovský Mikuláš. Labun is a midfielder or defender.

He previously played for FK LAFC Lučenec and Cercle Brugge in the Belgian First Division.

Labun has represented his country at youth level. He was also part of the Slovak team at the 2002 European U19 championship.

== Honours ==
=== Slovakia ===
Slovakia U20

- 2003 FIFA U-20 World Cup: Participation

Slovakia U19

- 2002 UEFA European Under-19 Football Championship - Third place
