= Oulun Palloseura (football) =

Finnish football club

- Full name: Oulun Palloseura
- Nickname: OPS
- Founded: 1925; 101 years ago
- Ground: Raatti Stadium; Oulu, Finland
- Capacity: 4,392
- Manager: Erkki Paananen
- League: Kolmonen
- 2022: 3rd
- Website: http://www.ops.fi
| Home colours | Away colours |

Oulun Palloseura (OPS) is a Finnish professional football club based in Oulu. Founded in 1925, the club is currently competing in the Finnish fourth tier – Kolmonen.

== History ==
The original Oulun Palloseura (Oulu Ball Club) was founded in 1925.

Contemporary club which is now called Oulun Palloseura dates back to 2006, when a third-tier club called FC Dreeverit was cleared to use the name OPS-jp. Next year the competition spot went to a registered association called Oulun Palloseura – jalkapallo ry. and then in 2008 to Oulun jalkapallon tuki ry. which is founded by Miika Juntunen.

In 2009 OPS-jp won the Group C of Kakkonen (the 3rd tier) and was promoted to Ykkönen. Since 2011 the club has been allowed to use the original name of Oulun Palloseura.

=== Season to season ===
| Season | Level | Division | Section | Administration | Position | Movements |
|---|---|---|---|---|---|---|
| 2006 | Tier 3 | Kakkonen (Second Division) | Group C | Finnish FA (Suomen Pallolitto) | 11th | OPS |
| 2007 | Tier 3 | Kakkonen (Second Division) | Group C | Finnish FA (Suomen Pallolitto) | 2nd | OPS |
| 2008 | Tier 3 | Ykkönen (Prineiro Division) | Group C | Finnish FA (Suomen Pallolitto) | 3rd | OPS |
| 2009 | Tier 3 | Kakkonen (Second Division) | Group C | Finnish FA (Suomen Pallolitto) | 1st | Promoted |
| 2010 | Tier 2 | Ykkönen (First Division) | | Finnish FA (Suomen Pallolitto) | 5th | |
| 2011 | Tier 2 | Ykkönen (First Division) | | Finnish FA (Suomen Pallolitto) | 2nd | |
| 2012 | Tier 2 | Ykkönen (First Division) | | Finnish FA (Suomen Pallolitto) | 5th | |
| 2013 | Tier 2 | Ykkönen (First Division) | | Finnish FA (Suomen Pallolitto) | 9th | Relegated |
| 2014 | Tier 3 | Kakkonen (Second Division) | Northern Group | Finnish FA (Suomen Pallolitto) | 5th | |
| 2015 | Tier 3 | Kakkonen (Second Division) | Northern Group | Finnish FA (Suomen Pallolitto) | 4th | |
| 2016 | Tier 3 | Kakkonen (Second Division) | C Group | Finnish FA (Suomen Pallolitto) | 1st | Promoted |
| 2017 | Tier 2 | Ykkönen (First Division) | | Finnish FA (Suomen Pallolitto) | 8th | |
| 2018 | Tier 2 | Ykkönen (First Division) | | Finnish FA (Suomen Pallolitto) | ? | |

- 6 seasons in Ykkönen
- 7 seasons in Kakkonen

== Current squad ==
Note: Flags indicate national team as defined under FIFA eligibility rules; some limited exceptions apply. Players may hold more than one non-FIFA nationality.

| No. | Pos. | Nation | Player |
|---|---|---|---|
| 1 | GK | FIN | Juhani Pennanen |
| 2 | DF | FIN | Antti Ulander |
| 3 | DF | FIN | Joni Leskelä |
| 5 | DF | FIN | Jere Moilanen |
| 6 | FW | NGA | Felix Orishani |
| 7 | MF | FIN | Matias Juntunen |
| 8 | FW | BRA | Thiago Trindade |
| 9 | MF | FIN | Oskari Rounaja |
| 10 | MF | FIN | Joni Lämsä |
| 11 | DF | CIV | Boliguibya Ouattara |
| 11 | MF | FIN | Valtteri Tikkanen |

| No. | Pos. | Nation | Player |
|---|---|---|---|
| 12 | GK | BRA | Dennys Rodrigues |
| 14 | FW | FIN | Konstantin Belov |
| 15 | DF | BEN | Seidou Guero |
| 16 | DF | FIN | Joona Juntunen |
| 17 | FW | FIN | Samuel Säily |
| 18 | DF | FIN | Eelis Koskinen |
| 19 | FW | BRA | Leandro Costa |
| 20 | MF | FIN | Arttu Haapala |
| 21 | DF | NGA | Augustine Jibrin |
| 22 | DF | ARG | Martín Pavez |
| 25 | FW | NGA | Michael Nzekwe |
