= Vegar Landro =

Norwegian footballer (born 1983)

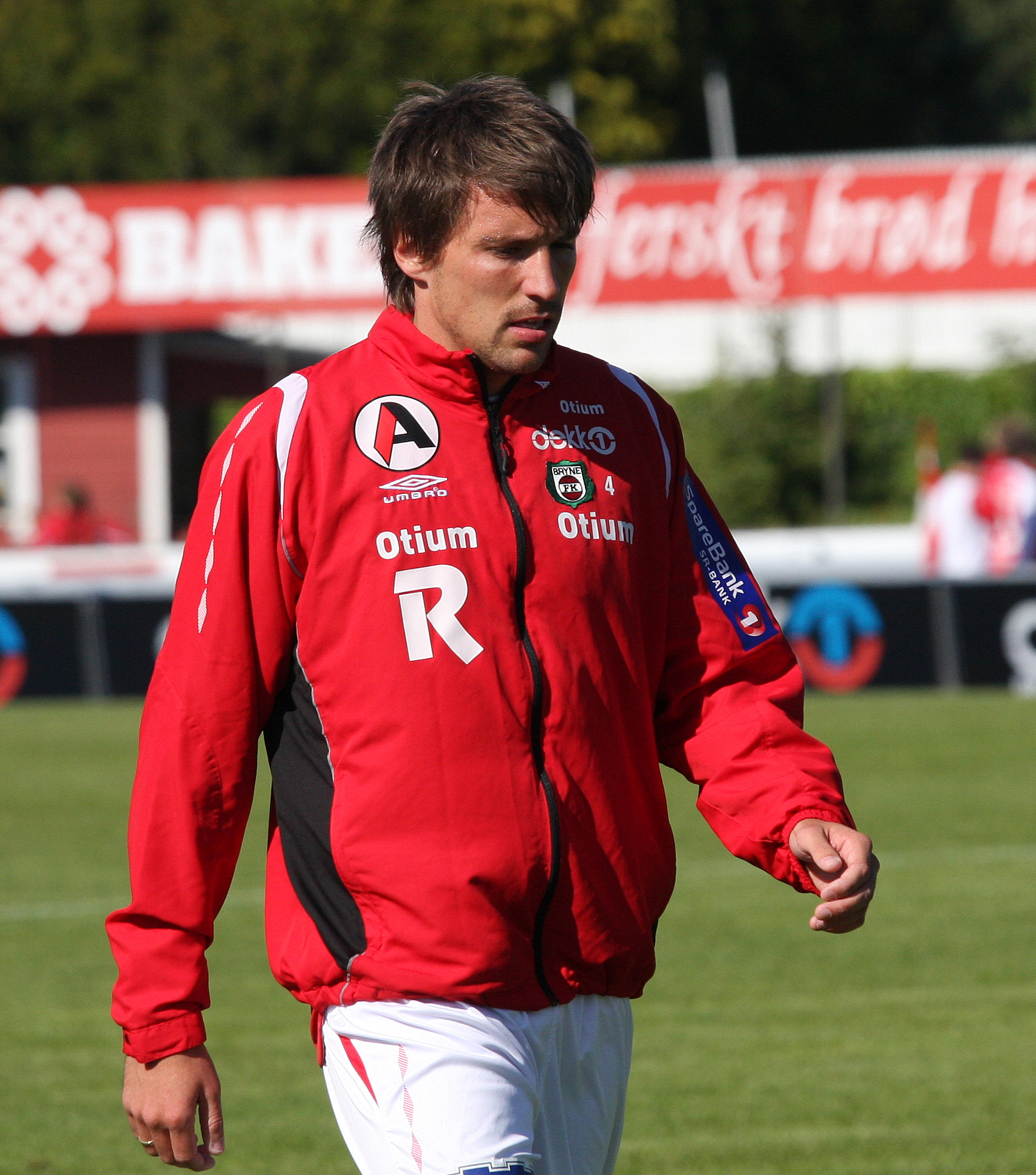

Personal information
- Full name: Vegar Landro
- Date of birth: 21 February 1983 (age 43)
- Place of birth: Bergen, Norway
- Height: 5 ft 11 in (1.80 m)
- Position: Defender

Team information
- Current team: Bryne
- Number: 4

Senior career*
Years	Team	Apps	(Gls)
2002–2003	Brann	2	(0)
2004–2005	Kongsvinger	18	(0)
2005–2006	Løv-Ham	34	(0)
2007–2017	Bryne	449	(19)

International career
2003–2004	Norway U-21		
- * Club domestic league appearances and goals as of 25 April 2015

Vegar Landro (born 21 February 1983) is a Norwegian footballer who plays for Bryne FK. He has formerly played for Nest-Sotra, Vadmyra IL, SK Brann, Kongsvinger IL and Løv-Ham.

He got appearances for Brann in Tippeligaen, before moving to Kongsvinger.

He has been capped for Norway u-21.
