= Roland Tüske =

Hungarian footballer

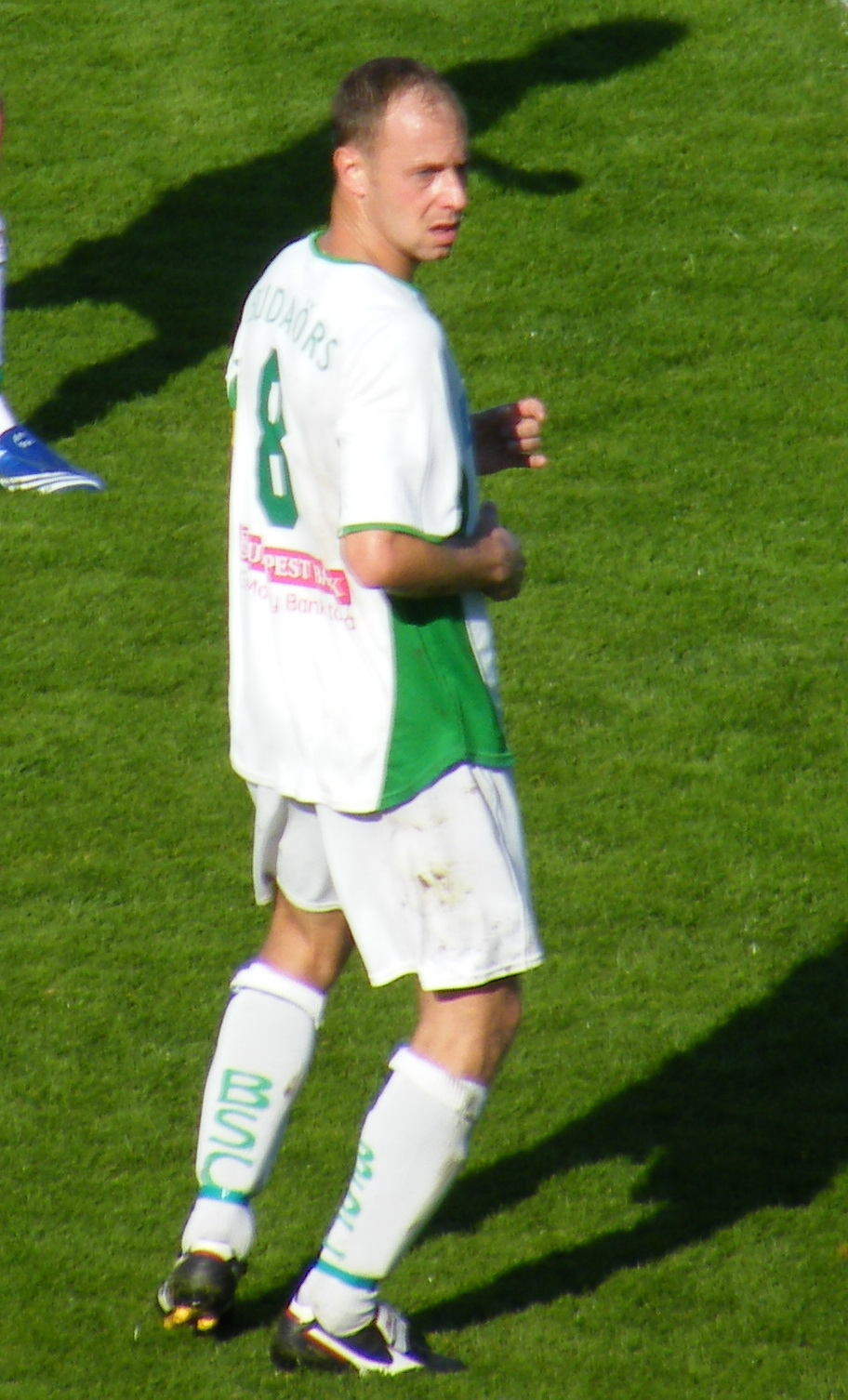

Personal information
- Date of birth: 12 September 1977 (age 49)
- Place of birth: Budapest, Hungary
- Height: 1.81 m (5 ft 11 in)
- Position: Striker

Team information
- Current team: Budaörsi SC

Youth career
- 1986–1995: Vasas SC

Senior career*
Years	Team	Apps	(Gls)
1995–1997	Vasas SC		
1997–2000	FC Tatabánya		
2000–2001	FC Sopron		
2001–2003	Szombathelyi Haladás		
2003	Atlético Paranaense	0	(0)
2004–2005	Lombard-Pápa TFC	15	(1)
2007–	Budaörsi SC	247	(83)
- * Club domestic league appearances and goals as of 2 August 2015

Roland Tüske (born 12 September 1977 in Budapest) is a Hungarian professional footballer who plays for Budaörsi SC.

== Career ==
Tüske began his career with Vasas SC before moving to FC Tatabánya in 1997. He then signed for FC Sopron in November 2000, before moving to Szombathelyi Haladás in 2001. He signed for Brazilian side Atlético Paranaense in February 2003, but left the club in May 2003 without making a first-team appearance. He later played for Lombard-Pápa TFC between 2004 and 2005, and for Budaörsi SC during the 2007–08 season.
