= Igor Hrabáč =

Slovak footballer

Personal information
- Full name: Igor Hrabáč
- Date of birth: 18 November 1983 (age 42)
- Place of birth: Banská Bystrica, Czechoslovakia
- Height: 1.87 m (6 ft 1 1/2 in)
- Position: Centre back

Team information
- Current team: MŠK Rimavská Sobota

Youth career
- ?–1999: Banská Bystrica
- 1999–2001: Sparta Prague

Senior career*
Years	Team	Apps	(Gls)
2001–2003	Sparta Prague "B"		
2003–2004	Laugaricio Trenčín		
2004–2005	DAC Dunajská Streda		
2006–2007	Rimavská Sobota		
2007	FK Mesto Prievidza		
2007–2010	Baník Sokolov	18	(1)
2010–2011	→DAC Dunajská Streda "loan"	29	(2)
2012–	Rimavská Sobota	1	(0)
- * Club domestic league appearances and goals as of 30 May 2012

Igor Hrabáč (born 18 November 1983 in Banská Bystrica) is a Slovak football defender who currently plays for the Slovak 2. liga club MŠK Rimavská Sobota.
