= Roman Jurko =

Slovak footballer

Personal information
- Full name: Roman Jurko
- Date of birth: 25 January 1983 (age 43)
- Place of birth: Košice, Czechoslovakia
- Height: 1.81 m (5 ft 11 1/2 in)
- Position: Striker

Youth career
- FK Trstená pri Hornáde
- 1. FC Košice

Senior career*
Years	Team	Apps	(Gls)
–2002	1. FC Košice	12	(1)
2002–2005	Slovan Bratislava		
- → Inter Bratislava (loan)
- → Družstevník Báč (loan)
- → FK DAC 1904 Dunajská Streda (loan)
2006	Hapoel Ra'anana		
2007	Alzira		
2008–2010	Bodva Moldava nad Bodvou		
2011	→ Partizán Bardejov (loan)	15	(4)
2012	Bodva Moldava nad Bodvou	14	(4)
2012–2015	Lokomotíva Košice	0	(0)
2014	→ Bodva Moldava nad Bodvou (loan)	0	(0)
2015–2017	FK Slovan Veľký Folkmar	0	(0)
2017–2018	MFK Spartak Medzev	0	(0)
2018–2022	MFK Ťahanovce	0	(0)

International career^{‡}
2002	Slovakia U19		
- * Club domestic league appearances and goals as of 30 May 2012 ‡ National team caps and goals as of 2 April 2011

Roman Jurko (born 25 January 1983 in Košice) is a Slovak former professional footballer who played as striker and last was manager for the 4. liga club FK Čaňa.

== Honours ==
=== Slovakia ===
Slovakia U19

- 2002 UEFA European Under-19 Football Championship - Third place
