= Dejan Peković =

Montenegrin footballer

Personal information
- Full name: Dejan Peković
- Date of birth: 4 April 1973 (age 53)
- Place of birth: Titograd, SR Montenegro, SFR Yugoslavia
- Height: 1.90 m (6 ft 3 in)
- Position: Striker

Youth career
- OFK Titograd

Senior career*
Years	Team	Apps	(Gls)
1993–1995	Budućnost Podgorica	22+	(10+)
1995–1996	Partizan	14	(1)
1997	Standard Liège	9	(1)
1997–1998	Budućnost Podgorica	14	(8)
1998	Puebla	3	(0)
1999–2000	Apollon Limassol	19	(3)
2001	Tatabánya	13	(5)
2004	Haladás	1	(0)
Total		95+	(28+)
- * Club domestic league appearances and goals

Dejan Peković (Serbian Cyrillic: Дејан Пековић; born 4 April 1973) is a Montenegrin former footballer who played as a striker.

== Career ==
In his homeland, Peković played for Budućnost Podgorica (1993–1995) and Partizan (1995–1996) in the First League of FR Yugoslavia, before moving abroad to Belgian club Standard Liège (1997). He subsequently returned to Budućnost Podgorica (1997–98), before moving abroad for the second time and joining Mexican club Puebla (1998). Over the following years, Peković also played for Cypriot club Apollon Limassol (1999–2000), as well as for Hungarian clubs Tatabánya (2001) and Haladás (2004).

== Personal life ==
Peković is the younger brother of basketball player Stevan Peković.

== Honours ==
Partizan

- First League of FR Yugoslavia: 1995–96
