= 2002 UEFA European Under-19 Championship =

2002 UEFA Europeiske U-19 mesterskapet

Tournament details
- Host country: Norway
- Dates: 21–28 July
- Teams: 8 (from 1 confederation)
- Venues: 7 (in 7 host cities)

Final positions
- Champions: Spain (4th title)
- Runners-up: Germany
- Third place: Slovakia
- Fourth place: Republic of Ireland

Tournament statistics
- Matches played: 14
- Goals scored: 49 (3.5 per match)
- Top scorer(s): (Spain) Fernando Torres (4 goals)
- Best player: (Spain) Fernando Torres

The 2002 UEFA European Under-19 Championship was the first edition of the UEFA European Under-19 Championship, after the previous Under-18 competition was renamed. The tournament was held in Norway, between 21 July and 28 July 2002. The top three teams from each group qualified for the 2003 FIFA World Youth Championship. Players born on or after 1 January 1983 were eligible to participate in this competition.

The final tournament took place in seven venues located in seven cities — Bærum, Drammen, Hønefoss, Kongsvinger, Lillestrøm, Moss and Oslo. The winners were Spain, who beat Germany to secure their fourth title, and the top scorer was Fernando Torres, with four goals. This edition is also notable for Nelly Viennot becoming the first female official who participated in an UEFA-organised men's football event, after acting as assistant referee at Norway's 1–5 defeat of Slovakia on 21 July 2002.

== Qualification ==
2002 UEFA European Under-19 Championship finalist teams

The qualification format consisted of two rounds. In the preliminary round, which took place between August and November 2001, 50 national teams were drawn into 14 groups (six groups of three teams and eight groups of four teams) contested as round-robin mini-tournaments hosted by one of the group teams. The group winners then progressed to the intermediary round, where they were paired and played two-legged ties between March and May 2002. The winners secured qualification for the final tournament, joining Norway who qualified automatically as hosts.

=== Qualified teams ===
The following eight teams qualified to the final tournament:

Country	Qualified as
Norway	Hosts
Belgium	Intermediary round play-off winner
Czech Republic	Intermediary round play-off winner
England	Intermediary round play-off winner
Spain	Intermediary round play-off winner
Germany	Intermediary round play-off winner
Republic of Ireland	Intermediary round play-off winner
Slovakia	Intermediary round play-off winner

== Venues ==
Location map of the final tournament host cities

The final tournament was held in seven stadiums located in seven Norwegian cities.

Stadium	City	Tenant club(s)	Capacity
Gjemselund Stadion	Kongsvinger	Kongsvinger	2,750
Melløs Stadion	Moss	Moss	10,000
Hønefoss idrettspark	Hønefoss	Hønefoss	4,000
Åråsen Stadion	Lillestrøm	Lillestrøm	11,637
Nadderud Stadion	Bærum	Stabæk	7,000
Marienlyst Stadion	Drammen	Strømsgodset	7,500
Ullevaal Stadion	Oslo	Lyn and Vålerenga	25,572

== Match officials ==
UEFA named six referees for the final tournament:

Country	Referee
Croatia	Edo Trivković
Estonia	Sten Kaldma
Greece	Georgios Kasnaferis
(North Macedonia) Macedonia	Emil Božinovski
Portugal	Paulo Costa
Slovenia	Darko Čeferin

== Results ==
=== Group stage ===
==== Group A ====
Teams	Pld	W	D	L	GF	GA	GD	Pts
Spain	3	2	1	0	7	2	+5	7
Slovakia	3	2	0	1	11	6	+5	6
Czech Republic	3	1	1	1	4	6	−2	4
Norway	3	0	0	3	1	9	−8	0

21 July 2002
18:00 CET

Norway	1–5	Slovakia
Grindheim 90' (pen.)	Report	Kurty 28'; Šebo 37'; Konečný 59'; Labun 75'; Jurko 86'

Gjemselund Stadion, Kongsvinger
Referee: Georgios Kasnaferis (Greece)
21 July 2002
18:00 CET

Spain	1–1	Czech Republic
Iniesta 63'	Report	Svěrkoš 78'

Melløs Stadion, Moss
Referee: Darko Čeferin (Slovenia)

23 July 2002
18:00 CET

Norway	0–3	Spain
	Report	Reyes 22', 68'; Torres 54'

Hønefoss idrettspark, Hønefoss
Referee: Emil Božinovski (Macedonia)
23 July 2002
18:00 CET

Slovakia	5–2	Czech Republic
Žofčák 16'; Halenár 33' (pen.); Šebo 46', 65'; Sloboda 87'	Report	Fořt 21' (pen.); Dosoudil 34'

Åråsen Stadion, Lillestrøm
Referee: Paulo Manuel Gomes Costa (Portugal)

25 July 2002
18:00 CET

Czech Republic	1–0	Norway
Rada 4'	Report

Nadderud Stadion, Bekkestua
Referee: Sten Kaldma (Estonia)
25 July 2002
18:00 CET

Slovakia	1–3	Spain
Čech 6'	Report	García 15'; Torres 65', 90+1'

Marienlyst Stadion, Drammen
Referee: Edo Trivković (Croatia)

==== Group B ====
Teams	Pld	W	D	L	GF	GA	GD	Pts
Germany	3	2	1	0	8	4	+4	7
Republic of Ireland	3	2	0	1	5	6	−1	6
England	3	0	2	1	6	7	−1	2
Belgium	3	0	1	2	3	5	−2	1

22 July 2002
18:00 CET

England	3–3	Germany
Ashton 9'; Thomas 30'; Cole 73'	Report	Volz 4'; Lahm 90'; Hanke 90+3'

Nadderud Stadion, Bekkestua
Referee: Edo Trivković (Croatia)
22 July 2002
18:00 CET

Belgium	1–2	Republic of Ireland
Blondel 51'	Report	Daly 26' (pen.), 69'

Marienlyst Stadion, Drammen
Referee: Sten Kaldma (Estonia)

24 July 2002
18:00 CET

England	1–1	Belgium
Ashton 75'	Report	Janssens 82'

Gjemselund Stadion, Kongsvinger
Referee: Darko Čeferin (Slovenia)
24 July 2002
18:00 CET

Germany	3–0	Republic of Ireland
Riether 22'; Trochowski 57'; Hanke 79'	Report

Melløs Stadion, Moss
Referee: Georgios Kasnaferis (Greece)

26 July 2002
18:00 CET

Republic of Ireland	3–2	England
Daly 54' (pen.); Paisley 73'; Kelly 74'	Report	Carter 11'; Ashton 45' (pen.)

Hønefoss idrettspark, Hønefoss
Referee: Paulo Manuel Gomes Costa (Portugal)
26 July 2002
18:00 CET

Germany	2–1	Belgium
Volz 36'; Odonkor 72'	Report	Vandenbergh 32'

Åråsen Stadion, Lillestrøm
Referee: Emil Božinovski (Macedonia)

=== Third place play-off ===
28 July 2002
13:00 CET

Slovakia	2–1	Republic of Ireland
Bruško 56'; Jurko 75'	Report	Brennan 53'

Ullevaal Stadion, Oslo
Referee: Sten Kaldma (Estonia)

=== Final ===
28 July 2002
20:00 CET

Spain	1–0	Germany
Torres 55'	Report

Ullevaal Stadion, Oslo
Attendance: 16,464
Referee: Darko Čeferin (Slovenia)

2002 UEFA U-19 European champions

Spain
Fourth title

== Goalscorers ==
4 goals

- (Spain) Fernando Torres

3 goals

- (England) Dean Ashton
- (Republic of Ireland) Jon Daly
- (Slovakia) Filip Šebo

2 goals

- (Germany) Mike Hanke
- (Germany) Moritz Volz
- (Slovakia) Roman Jurko
- (Spain) José Antonio Reyes

1 goal

- (Belgium) Jonathan Blondel
- (Belgium) Styn Janssens
- (Belgium) Kevin Vandenbergh
- (Czech Republic) Radek Dosoudil
- (Czech Republic) Pavel Fořt
- (Czech Republic) Tomáš Rada
- (Czech Republic) Václav Svěrkoš
- (England) Darren Carter
- (England) Carlton Cole
- (England) Jerome Thomas
- (Germany) Philipp Lahm
- (Germany) David Odonkor
- (Germany) Sascha Riether
- (Germany) Piotr Trochowski
- (Republic of Ireland) Stephen Brennan
- (Republic of Ireland) Stephen Kelly
- (Republic of Ireland) Stephen Paisley
- (Norway) Christian Grindheim
- (Slovakia) Tomáš Bruško
- (Slovakia) Marek Čech
- (Slovakia) Juraj Halenár
- (Slovakia) Roman Konečný
- (Slovakia) Marián Kurty
- (Slovakia) Tomáš Labun
- (Slovakia) Tomás Sloboda
- (Slovakia) Igor Žofčák
- (Spain) Andrés Iniesta
- (Spain) Sergio García

== Qualification to World Youth Championship ==
The six best performing teams qualified for the 2003 FIFA World Youth Championship:

- Czech Republic
- England
- Spain
- Germany
- Republic of Ireland
- Slovakia
