= Henrik Batikyan =

Armenian footballer

Personal information
- Full name: Henrik Batikyan
- Date of birth: 12 February 1977 (age 49)
- Place of birth: Yerevan, Armenia
- Position: Midfielder

Team information
- Current team: Shirak Gyumri

Senior career*
Years	Team	Apps	(Gls)
1997–	Shirak Gyumri	66	(1)

International career^{‡}
1998	Armenia	1	(0)
- * Club domestic league appearances and goals as of June 2009 ‡ National team caps and goals as of November 2009

Henrik Batikyan (Armenian: Հենրիկ Բատիկյան, born 12 February 1977) is an Armenian footballer. He currently plays for the Armenian Premier League club Shirak Gyumri.
