= Jan Velkoborský =

Czech footballer (born 1975)

Personal information
- Date of birth: 14 July 1975 (age 51)
- Place of birth: Plzeň, Czechoslovakia
- Height: 1.90 m (6 ft 3 in)
- Position: Defender

Senior career*
Years	Team	Apps	(Gls)
1994–1995	VTJ Karlovy Vary		
1995–1996	FK Tachov		
1995–1999	Viktoria Plzeň	67	(6)
1999–2003	Chmel Blšany	99	(7)
2003–2004	LR Ahlen	41	(1)
2004–2005	Baník Ostrava	5	(0)
2005	→ FK Viktoria Žižkov (loan)	13	(0)
2005–2006	LR Ahlen	19	(2)
2006–2008	SV Elversberg	48	(2)
2008–2009	1. FC Karlovy Vary		

International career
1997	Czech Republic U21	1	(0)
2001	Czech Republic	2	(0)
- * Club domestic league appearances and goals

Jan Velkoborský (born 14 July 1975) is a Czech former professional footballer who played as a defender. He played international football for the Czech Republic national team.
