= Maciej Nuckowski =

Polish footballer

Maciej Nuckowski Μάτσεϊ Νουτσκόφσκι
Personal information
- Date of birth: 21 March 1976 (age 49)
- Place of birth: Bydgoszcz, Poland
- Height: 1.84 m (6 ft 0 in)
- Position(s): Winger

Senior career*
Years	Team	Apps	(Gls)
1992–1996	Zawisza Bydgoszcz	24+	(3)
1996	BSC Sendling		
1996–1998	Zawisza Bydgoszcz		(8)
1998–2000	Zagłębie Lubin	41	(5)
2000	→ Dyskobolia Grodzisk (loan)	11	(1)
2000–2002	Dyskobolia Grodzisk	26	(3)
2002–2003	Lech Poznań	0	(0)
2003	Polonia Warsaw	27	(4)
2004–2005	ŁKS Łódź	29	(5)
2005–2006	Ross County	12	(1)
2006–2007	Olympiacos Volos	11	(0)
2006–2007	Hapoel Bnei Lod	11	(1)
2007	Zakynthos	17	(5)
2007–2008	Panegialios	28	(9)
2008–2009	Lamia	7	(1)
2009–2010	Fokikos		
2010	Eordaikos		
- *Club domestic league appearances and goals

Maciej Nuckowski (Greek: Μάτσεϊ Νουτσκόφσκι; born 21 March 1976 in Poland) is a Polish former professional footballer who played as a winger. He now operates a Zante Magic Tours travel agency in Greece.

== Career ==
Nuckowski started his senior career with Zawisza Bydgoszcz. In 2005, he signed for Ross County in the Scottish Championship, where he made fifteen appearances and scored one goal. After that, he played for Israeli club Hapoel Bnei Lod, and Greek clubs A.P.S. Zakynthos, Panegialios, PAS Lamia 1964, Fokikos, and Eordaikos 2007 before retiring in 2010.
