= Iurie Priganiuc =

Moldovan footballer

Personal information
- Date of birth: 23 October 1978 (age 48)
- Place of birth: Soviet Union
- Height: 1.91 m (6 ft 3 in)
- Position: Defender

Senior career*
Years	Team	Apps	(Gls)
1995	Nistru Cioburciu	10	(0)
1996–2001	Tiligul Tiraspol	129	(8)
2002–2004	Sheriff Tiraspol	67	(4)
2005	Khimki	20	(2)
2006	Spartak Nizhny Novgorod	29	(0)
2007	SKA-Energia Khabarovsk	7	(0)
2008	Tiligul-Tiras Tiraspol		
2009	Druzhba Maykop	30	(5)

International career
2000–2005	Moldova	26	(0)
- * Club domestic league appearances and goals as of 14 November 2010

Iurie Priganiuc (born 23 October 1978) is a former Moldovan professional footballer.

Priganiuc arrived in Russia in January 2005. He signed a three-year contract with FC Khimki.

== International career ==
He played his last official game for Moldova on 12 October 2005. In the whole 2006 FIFA World Cup qualification, Priganiuc played in nine of Moldova's ten matches, missing one through suspension.
