= 2002 UEFA European Under-19 Championship qualifying =

Sportsseason of soccer competition

This article features the 2002 UEFA European Under-19 Championship qualifying stage. It was the first qualifying stage after UEFA changed the age requirements from under-18 to under-19. The format of the qualifying remained the same as the previous 2001 UEFA European Under-18 Championship qualifying. Matches were played from 1 September 2001 through 1 June 2002. 50 teams took part in the competition. Two qualifying rounds were organised and seven teams qualified for the main tournament, joining host Norway. The first round consisted of 14 groups, the winners of which would progress to the second round. Competitions in the first round were conducted either in a single or double round robin tournament format. Competitions in the second round were conducted in the playoff format consisting of two legs.

== Round 1 ==
=== Group 1 ===
Team	Pld	W	D	L	GF	GA	GD	Pts
Germany	4	3	1	0	11	4	+7	10
Turkey	4	1	1	2	7	8	−1	4
Sweden	4	1	0	3	5	11	−6	3

Sweden	3–2	Turkey
Sweden	0–4	Germany
Turkey	2–1	Sweden
Turkey	2–2	Germany
Germany	3–1	Sweden
Germany	2–1	Turkey

=== Group 2 ===
Team	Pld	W	D	L	GF	GA	GD	Pts
Poland	2	2	0	0	4	0	+4	6
Wales	2	1	0	1	6	2	+4	3
Estonia	2	0	0	2	1	9	−8	0

All matches were played in Estonia.

Estonia	1–6	Wales
Wales	0–1	Poland
Poland	3–0	Estonia

=== Group 3 ===
Team	Pld	W	D	L	GF	GA	GD	Pts
Lithuania	2	2	0	0	3	0	+3	6
Russia	2	1	0	1	3	2	+1	3
Cyprus	2	0	0	2	1	5	−4	0

All matches were played in Lithuania.

Lithuania	1–0	Russia
Cyprus	0–2	Lithuania
Russia	3–1	Cyprus

=== Group 4 ===
Team	Pld	W	D	L	GF	GA	GD	Pts
England	2	2	0	0	7	2	+5	6
Hungary	2	0	1	1	2	4	−2	1
Georgia	2	0	1	1	2	5	−3	1

All matches were played in England.

England	4–1	Georgia
Georgia	1–1	Hungary
England	3–1	Hungary

=== Group 5 ===
Team	Pld	W	D	L	GF	GA	GD	Pts
Macedonia	2	2	0	0	5	3	+2	6
Finland	2	1	0	1	4	3	+1	3
Azerbaijan	2	0	0	2	1	4	−3	0

All matches were played in Finland.

Azerbaijan	0–2	Finland
Macedonia	2–1	Azerbaijan
Finland	2–3	Macedonia

=== Group 6 ===
Team	Pld	W	D	L	GF	GA	GD	Pts
Spain	4	4	0	0	17	1	+16	12
Switzerland	4	2	0	2	8	6	+2	6
Armenia	4	0	0	4	1	19	−18	0

Spain	2–0	Switzerland
Armenia	0–4	Switzerland
Switzerland	3–1	Armenia
Armenia	0–6	Spain
Spain	6–0	Armenia
Switzerland	1–3	Spain

=== Group 7 ===
Team	Pld	W	D	L	GF	GA	GD	Pts
Czech Republic	3	2	1	0	18	3	+15	7
Iceland	3	2	1	0	10	2	+8	7
Ukraine	3	1	0	2	4	4	0	3
Andorra	3	0	0	3	0	23	−23	0

All matches were played in the Czech Republic.

Czech Republic	2–2	Iceland
Ukraine	3–0	Andorra
Andorra	0–7	Iceland
Ukraine	1–3	Czech Republic
Iceland	1–0	Ukraine
Andorra	0–13	Czech Republic

=== Group 8 ===
Team	Pld	W	D	L	GF	GA	GD	Pts
Bulgaria	3	2	1	0	7	3	+4	7
Denmark	3	1	1	1	3	3	0	4
Malta	3	1	0	2	2	5	−3	3
Luxembourg	3	0	2	1	2	3	−1	2

All matches were played in Luxembourg.

Malta	1–4	Bulgaria
Luxembourg	1–1	Denmark
Denmark	1–2	Bulgaria
Luxembourg	0–1	Malta
Bulgaria	1–1	Luxembourg
Denmark	1–0	Malta

=== Group 9 ===
Team	Pld	W	D	L	GF	GA	GD	Pts
Slovakia	3	2	1	0	5	1	+4	7
Bosnia and Herzegovina	3	1	1	1	2	2	0	4
Northern Ireland	3	1	1	1	2	2	0	4
Liechtenstein	3	0	1	2	1	5	−4	1

All matches were played in Liechtenstein.

Slovakia	3–0	Liechtenstein
Northern Ireland	0–1	Bosnia and Herzegovina
Bosnia and Herzegovina	1–1	Liechtenstein
Northern Ireland	1–1	Slovakia
Bosnia and Herzegovina	0–1	Slovakia
Liechtenstein	0–1	Northern Ireland

=== Group 10 ===
Team	Pld	W	D	L	GF	GA	GD	Pts
Portugal	3	2	0	1	5	2	+3	6
Italy	3	2	0	1	6	2	+4	6
Belarus	3	1	1	1	2	3	−1	4
Moldova	3	0	1	2	0	6	−6	1

All matches were played in Italy.

Belarus	0–2	Italy
Moldova	0–2	Portugal
Portugal	2–0	Italy
Moldova	0–0	Belarus
Portugal	1–2	Belarus
Italy	4–0	Moldova

=== Group 11 ===
Team	Pld	W	D	L	GF	GA	GD	Pts
Belgium	6	3	1	2	10	5	+5	10
Romania	6	2	3	1	9	6	+3	9
FR Yugoslavia	6	2	2	2	6	9	−3	8
Israel	6	1	2	3	4	9	−5	5

Romania	1–1	Belgium
Israel	1–1	Romania
FR Yugoslavia	0–4	Romania
Belgium	3–1	Israel
Romania	1–1	FR Yugoslavia
Belgium	3–1	FR Yugoslavia
Israel	1–0	Belgium
FR Yugoslavia	1–0	Belgium
Romania	2–0	Israel
FR Yugoslavia	3–1	Israel
Belgium	3–0	Romania
Israel	0–0	FR Yugoslavia

=== Group 12 ===
Team	Pld	W	D	L	GF	GA	GD	Pts
Greece	3	2	0	1	9	4	+5	6
Slovenia	3	2	0	1	7	4	+3	6
Scotland	3	2	0	1	5	4	+1	6
Faroe Islands	3	0	0	3	1	10	−9	0

All matches were played in Slovenia.

Slovenia	3–2	Greece
Faroe Islands	1–2	Scotland
Greece	2–1	Scotland
Slovenia	3–0	Faroe Islands
Greece	5–0	Faroe Islands
Scotland	2–1	Slovenia

=== Group 13 ===
Team	Pld	W	D	L	GF	GA	GD	Pts
Netherlands	3	3	0	0	17	2	+15	9
France	3	2	0	1	11	2	+9	6
Albania	3	0	1	2	2	14	−12	1
San Marino	3	0	1	2	1	13	−12	1

All matches were played in France.

Albania	1–8	Netherlands
France	5–0	San Marino
Netherlands	7–0	San Marino
Albania	0–5	France
San Marino	1–1	Albania
Netherlands	2–1	France

=== Group 14 ===
Team	Pld	W	D	L	GF	GA	GD	Pts
Republic of Ireland	3	3	0	0	8	1	+7	9
Croatia	3	2	0	1	6	4	+2	6
Austria	3	1	0	2	2	3	−1	3
Latvia	3	0	0	3	1	9	−8	0

All matches were played in Ireland.

Austria	0–1	Croatia
Republic of Ireland	3–0	Latvia
Croatia	4–1	Latvia
Austria	0–2	Republic of Ireland
Latvia	0–2	Austria
Croatia	1–3	Republic of Ireland

== Round 2 ==
Team 1	Agg.	Team 2	1st leg	2nd leg
Germany	(a)2–2	Poland	0–0	2–2
Lithuania	2–3	England	1–1	1–2
Macedonia	1–7	Spain	1–3	0–4
Czech Republic	4–2	Bulgaria	1–1	3–1
Slovakia	2–1	Portugal	1–1	1–0
Belgium	6–2	Greece	4–1	2–1
Netherlands	1–2	Republic of Ireland	1–2	0–0
