= Aleksandar Bratić =

Yugoslav footballer

Personal information
- Date of birth: 4 April 1972 (age 54)
- Place of birth: Trebinje, SFR Yugoslavia
- Height: 1.92 m (6 ft 4 in)
- Position: Defender

Youth career
- 1985–1988: Leotar

Senior career*
Years	Team	Apps	(Gls)
1988–1992	Leotar	38	(2)
1992–1993	Hajduk Beograd	30	(0)
1993–1996	Rad	77	(0)
1996–1997	Red Star Belgrade	7	(0)
1997–1999	OFK Beograd	84	(0)
1999–2000	Iraklis	7	(0)
2000–2004	Servette	83	(3)
2004–2005	Chênois	22	(2)
2005–2009	Servette	104	(1)
2009–2010	Grand-Lancy	56	(1)

International career
- Yugoslavia U18
	Bosnia-Herzegovina	1	(0)
- * Club domestic league appearances and goals

Aleksandar Bratić (Serbian Cyrillic: Александар Братић; born 4 April 1972) is a Bosnian-Herzegovinian former professional footballer who played as a defender.

== Club career ==
Bratić was born in Trebinje, then Yugoslavia now Bosnia and Herzegovina, and started to play with local side FK Leotar playing with them in the Yugoslav Second League between 1988 and 1992. Due to the start of the war, Bratić moved to Serbia and joined Hajduk Beograd playing in the Serbian League Belgrade. During the 1990s, he would represent several other clubs in Serbia, namely FK Rad, OFK Beograd and the former European Champions Red Star Belgrade. He left Yugoslavia in January 2000 for Iraklis. In summer 2000, he moved to Switzerland and joined Servette FC playing with them for almost an entire decade. He last played for Grand-Lancy FC in the 2009–10 Swiss 1. Liga.

== International career ==
Bratić was a member of the Yugoslav under-18 national team, and after the break-up of Yugoslavia he became a member of the Bosnia and Herzegovina national team having made one appearance for them.

== Personal life ==
Bratić is of Bosnian Serb origin.

== Honours ==
Red Star Belgrade

- FR Yugoslavia Cup: 1997

Servette

- Swiss Cup: 2001
