= Milan Zachariáš =

Czech footballer (born 1983)

Personal information
- Date of birth: 1 October 1983 (age 43)
- Place of birth: Czechoslovakia
- Height: 1.86 m (6 ft 1 in)
- Position: Defender

Team information
- Current team: FK Ústí nad Labem
- Number: 6

Senior career*
Years	Team	Apps	(Gls)
2003–2004	Slavia Prague	19	(1)
2004–2009	Blšany		
2005–2006	→ SC Xaverov (loan)		
2009–	FK Ústí nad Labem	67	(6)

International career^{‡}
2002	Czech Republic U19	6	(0)
2003	Czech Republic U20	5	(0)
2004	Czech Republic U21	1	(0)
- * Club domestic league appearances and goals as of 30 June 2012 ‡ National team caps and goals as of 10 September 2011

Milan Zachariáš (born 1 October 1983) is a Czech football defender who plays for FK Ústí nad Labem in the Czech 2. Liga. He represented his country at youth international level.
