= Roman Konečný =

Slovak footballer

Personal information
- Full name: Roman Konečný
- Date of birth: 25 July 1983 (age 43)
- Place of birth: Holíč, Czechoslovakia
- Height: 1.89 m (6 ft 2 in)
- Position: Centre back

Team information
- Current team: FK Hodonin

Youth career
- Spartak Trnava

Senior career*
Years	Team	Apps	(Gls)
2001–2005	Spartak Trnava	62	(2)
2005–2007	Artmedia Petržalka	31	(1)
2007–2008	Senec	5	(0)
2008–2009	Artmedia Petržalka	30	(1)
2010	Thrasyvoulos	11	(0)
2010–2011	Dunajská Streda	37	(1)
2012	Slovan Bratislava	10	(1)
2013–2016	Skalica	42	(6)
2016	FK Hodonín		
2016	Skalica	5	(0)
2016–	FK Hodonín		

International career
2003	Slovakia U20	4	(0)
- * Club domestic league appearances and goals as of 5 April 2017 (UTC)

Roman Konečný (born 25 July 1983) is a Slovak football defender who currently plays for FK Hodonin.

== Club career ==
Born in Holíč, Konečný began playing football with local side FC Spartak Trnava. In January 2010, he would move abroad to play in the Greek second division with Thrasyvoulos F.C. He spent the second half of the 2009–10 season with the Greek club before returning to the Slovak league with DAC Dunajská Streda in August of the same year.

== International career ==
Konečný played for Slovakia at the 2003 FIFA World Youth Championship in the United Arab Emirates.

== Honours ==
=== Slovakia ===
Slovakia U20

- 2003 FIFA U-20 World Cup: Participation

Slovakia U19

- 2002 UEFA European Under-19 Football Championship - Third place
