= Miika Juntunen =

Finnish footballer (born 1964)

Personal information
- Date of birth: 9 October 1964 (age 62)
- Place of birth: Kemi, Finland
- Height: 1.81 m (5 ft 11 in)
- Position: Midfielder

Senior career*
Years	Team	Apps	(Gls)
1980–1982	OPS		
1983	Koparit		
1984–1988	KePS		
1986	→ Örgryte IS		
1989–1992	Ilves		
1994–1999	TPV		
1996	→ Ilves		
2000	Kotkan Jäntevä		
2001	Jazz		
2004?	AC Oulu		
2006?	OPS		

International career
1986	Finland B	2	(0)

Managerial career
- 2003–2006: AC Oulu (club director)
- 2007–: OPS (club director)
- 2017: OPS
- 2020: KPV
- 2021–2023: OPS
- * Club domestic league appearances and goals

Miika Juntunen (born 9 October 1964) is a Finnish football manager and a former professional football midfielder. He is the current club president of Oulun Palloseura. As a player, he has won two Finnish championship titles, with Jazz in 1993 and with TPV in 1994. Additionally, he won the Finnish Cup with Ilves in 1990.

After his playing career, Juntunen served as the team manager of newly formatted AC Oulu until 2006, when he was sacked due to disagreements with the club. Later he acquired another Oulu-based club OPS, which he has also coached occasionally.

== Honours ==
TPV

- Veikkausliiga: 1994

Jazz

- Veikkausliiga: 1993

Ilves

- Finnish Cup: 1990
