= Hasan Kacić =

Croatian footballer

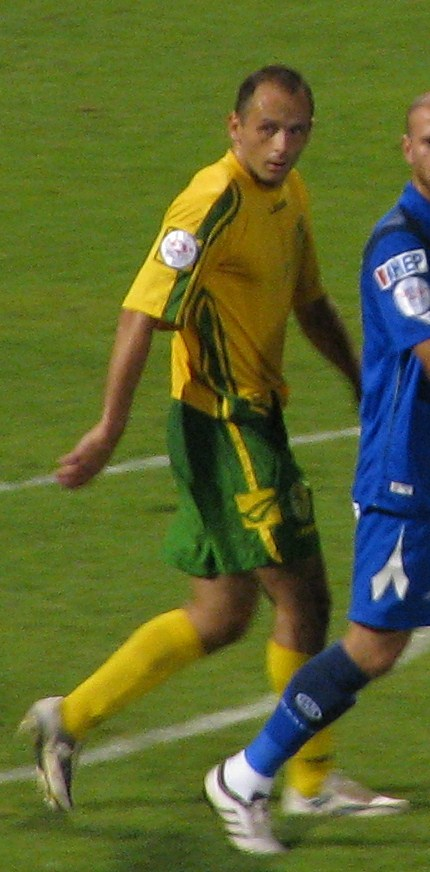

Personal information
- Date of birth: 29 July 1976 (age 50)
- Place of birth: Dubrovnik, SR Croatia, SFR Yugoslavia
- Height: 1.79 m (5 ft 10 1/2 in)
- Position: Defender

Youth career
- HNK Dubrovnik

Senior career*
Years	Team	Apps	(Gls)
1994–1998	HNK Dubrovnik	3	(0)
1999–2001	Slaven Belupo	89	(1)
2001–2006	Lierse SK	104	(0)
2007–2011	Istra 1961	116	(3)
2011–2014	GOŠK Dubrovnik	35	(2)

Managerial career
- 2021: GOŠK Dubrovnik
- * Club domestic league appearances and goals as of 13 May 2010

Hasan Kacić (born 29 July 1976) is a Croatian retired football defender of Bosnian descent.

== Club career ==
He played for HNK Dubrovnik, Slaven Belupo, Belgian First Division side Lierse and Prva HNL side NK Istra 1961. At Lierse, Kacić was suspended for two years in 2007 due to his alleged involvement in a match-fixing scandal surrounding Chinese businessman Ye Zheyun.

== Managerial career ==
He was manager of GOŠK Dubrovnik in 2021, but returned to coach at the club's academy after the arrival of Frane Lojić in 2021.
