= Joakim Austnes =

Norwegian footballer (born 1983)

Personal information
- Full name: Joakim Rune Austnes
- Date of birth: February 20, 1983 (age 43)
- Place of birth: Ålesund, Norway
- Positions: Midfielder; winger

Youth career
- Ha/No

Senior career*
Years	Team	Apps	(Gls)
2005–2007	Aalesund	64	(15)
2008–2010	Viking	26	(0)
2011	Ha/No		

International career
2002	Norway U-19	6	(1)
2003	Norway U-20	2	(0)
2003–2005	Norway U-21	12	(0)
- * Club domestic league appearances and goals

Joakim Rune Austnes (born 20 February 1983) is a Norwegian former professional football forward. During his active career, he played for Aalesund and Viking in Tippeligaen.

== Club career ==
Austnes played for Aalesund from 2001 to 2007, before he joined Viking ahead of the 2008-season. He made his official debut for Viking as a 70th-minute substitute for Alexander Ødegaard in the 2008 season opener against Strømsgodset IF.

After the 2010 season, Austnes decided to step down from professional football and returned to his youth club Haramsøy/Nordøy FK.

== International career ==
Austnes has played for the Norwegian U-19, U-20 and U-21-teams, making his debut 14 January 2003 in a match against Brazil.
