= Pavo Crnac =

Croatian footballer

Personal information
- Date of birth: 10 March 1971 (age 55)
- Place of birth: Slavonski Brod
- Height: 1.88 m (6 ft 2 in)
- Position: Defender

Senior career*
Years	Team	Apps	(Gls)
1994–1997	Marsonia	77	(2)
1997–2006	Slaven Belupo	133	(14)
2007–2009	Koprivnica		

Managerial career
- 2020–: NK Koprivnica (assistant)
- * Club domestic league appearances and goals

Pavo Crnac (born 10 March 1971) is a retired Croatian football defender.
