= Marián Kurty =

Slovak footballer

Personal information
- Date of birth: 13 May 1983 (age 43)
- Place of birth: Bardejov, Czechoslovakia
- Height: 1.78 m (5 ft 10 in)
- Position: Midfielder

Youth career
- ?–2001: Bardejov

Senior career*
Years	Team	Apps	(Gls)
2001–2005	Ružomberok	91	(9)
2006	Banská Bystrica		

International career
2002	Slovakia U19		
2003	Slovakia U20		
2003	Slovakia	1	(0)

Managerial career
- 2021–2022: Partizán Bardejov (assistant)
- * Club domestic league appearances and goals

Marián Kurty (born 13 May 1983) is a Slovak former footballer who played as a midfielder.

== Career ==
Kurty was born in Bardejov. He started his professional career at BSC Bardejov. In 2001, he joined Slovak club MŠK SCP Ružomberok. After termination of the contract in Ružomberok, he moved to FK Dukla Banská Bystrica. For chronic back problems, still untied contract with FK Dukla Banská Bystrica. Persistent health problems had the effect of ending his career.

== Honours ==
Slovakia U19

- UEFA European Under-19 Football Championship third place: 2002
