= Demir Ramović =

Montenegrin footballer

Personal information
- Full name: Demir Ramović
- Date of birth: 3 January 1982 (age 44)
- Place of birth: Bijelo Polje, SR Montenegro, SFR Yugoslavia
- Height: 1.89 m (6 ft 2 in)
- Position: Midfielder

Youth career
- Jedinstvo Bijelo Polje

Senior career*
Years	Team	Apps	(Gls)
1999–2000	Jedinstvo Bijelo Polje	25	(4)
2000–2005	Smederevo	85	(8)
2005–2006	Zrinjski Mostar	16	(0)
2006–2007	Jedinstvo Bijelo Polje	19	(0)
2007	Rudar Pljevlja	2	(0)
2008	Jedinstvo Bijelo Polje	13	(0)
2009–2015	Dečić	86	(2)
Total		246	(14)

International career
2000–2001	FR Yugoslavia U18	8	(0)
- * Club domestic league appearances and goals

Demir Ramović (Serbian Cyrillic: Демир Рамовић; born 3 January 1982), also known as ramovicOAK, is a Montenegrin eFootball player and former footballer who played as a midfielder. He represented Montenegro at the UEFA eEURO 2020.

== Club career ==
Ramović started out at his hometown club Jedinstvo Bijelo Polje, before transferring to Sartid Smederevo in the summer of 2000. He spent five years with the club, winning the Serbia and Montenegro Cup in the 2002–03 season. In 2005, Ramović moved to Bosnia and Herzegovina and signed with Premier League side Zrinjski Mostar.

In the summer of 2006, Ramović returned to Montenegro, shortly after the country declared its independence, and rejoined Jedinstvo Bijelo Polje for the inaugural 2006–07 Montenegrin First League. He later briefly played for Rudar Pljevlja, before returning to Jedinstvo. In early 2009, Ramović joined fellow First League club Dečić.

== International career ==
Ramović represented FR Yugoslavia at the 2001 UEFA European Under-18 Championship, as the team lost to Spain in the third-place match.

== Statistics ==
Club	Season	League	
Club	Season	Apps	Goals
Smederevo	2000–01	24	1
Smederevo	2001–02	22	4
Smederevo	2002–03	24	2
Smederevo	2003–04	5	0
Smederevo	2004–05	10	1
Smederevo	Total	85	8
Zrinjski Mostar	2005–06	16	0
Jedinstvo Bijelo Polje	2006–07	19	0
Rudar Pljevlja	2007–08	2	0
Jedinstvo Bijelo Polje	2008–09	13	0
Dečić	2008–09	5	0
Dečić	2009–10	18	0
Dečić	2010–11	26	0
Dečić	2011–12	3	1
Dečić	2012–13		
Dečić	2013–14	27	1
Dečić	2014–15		
Dečić	2015–16	7	0
Dečić	Total	86	2

== Honours ==
Sartid Smederevo

- Serbia and Montenegro Cup: 2002–03
