= Ekrem Bradarić =

Bosnia and Herzegovina footballer

Personal information
- Full name: Ekrem Bradarić
- Date of birth: 12 July 1969 (age 57)
- Place of birth: Maglaj, SR Bosnia and Herzegovina, SFR Yugoslavia
- Position: Defender

Team information
- Current team: Vis Simm-Bau (assistant)

Senior career*
Years	Team	Apps	(Gls)
1991–1992	Sloboda Tuzla		
1994–1996	Rijeka	17	(0)
1997–1998	Čelik Zenica	28	(0)
1998–1999	Adanaspor	21	(0)
1999–2003	Čelik Zenica	119	(3)
2003–2005	Ljubuški		
2005–2006	Gradina		
2006–2009	Travnik	73	(0)
2010–2011	Vitez		

International career
1996–1997	Bosnia and Herzegovina	2	(0)

Managerial career
- 2019: Vis Simm-Bau
- 2019: Krivaja
- * Club domestic league appearances and goals

Ekrem Bradarić (born 12 July 1969) is a Bosnian professional football manager and former player. He was most recently the assistant manager of First League of FBIH club Vis Simm-Bau.

== Club career ==
Bradarić played as a defender for Sloboda Tuzla, Rijeka, Čelik Zenica, Adanaspor, Ljubuški, Gradina and Travnik.

== International career ==
Bradarić made his debut for Bosnia and Herzegovina in an April 1996 friendly match against Albania in Zenica and has earned a total of 2 caps, scoring no goals. His second and final international was a November 1997 friendly against Tunisia.

== Managerial career ==
As a manager, Bradarić worked at Bosnian clubs Vis Simm-Bau and Krivaja.

== Honours ==
=== Player ===
Travnik

- First League of FBIH: 2006–07
