= Korczak (film) =

- Original Polish release poster
- Directed by: Andrzej Wajda
- Written by: Agnieszka Holland
- Produced by: Janusz Morgenstern; Willi Segler; Daniel Toscan du Plantier; Regina Ziegler
- Starring: Wojciech Pszoniak; Ewa Dałkowska; Teresa Budzisz-Krzyzanowska; Marzena Trybala; Piotr Kozlowski; Zbigniew Zamachowski; Jan Peszek
- Cinematography: Robby Müller
- Edited by: Ewa Smal
- Music by: Wojciech Kilar
- Production companies: British Broadcasting Corporation; Zweites Deutsches Fernsehen
- Distributed by: New Yorker Films
- Release dates: 6 May 1990 (Poland); 26 October 1990 (United Kingdom); 21 March 1991 (Germany)
- Running time: 117 minutes
- Countries: Poland; Germany; United Kingdom
- Language: Polish

Korczak is a 1990 black-and-white biographical Holocaust film directed by Andrzej Wajda and written by Agnieszka Holland, about the Polish-Jewish pediatrician and humanitarian Janusz Korczak. An international co-production between Poland, Germany and the United Kingdom, it stars Wojciech Pszoniak as Korczak, with Ewa Dałkowska, Teresa Budzisz-Krzyzanowska, Marzena Trybala, Piotr Kozlowski, Zbigniew Zamachowski and Jan Peszek.

The film was screened outside of competition during the 1990 Cannes Film Festival. It was selected as the Polish entry for the Best Foreign Language Film at the 63rd Academy Awards in 1991, but was not accepted as a nominee.

== Cast ==
- Wojciech Pszoniak - Henryk Goldszmit (better known as Janusz Korczak)
- Ewa Dałkowska - Stefania 'Stefa' Wilczynska
- Teresa Budzisz-Krzyżanowska - Maryna Falska
- Marzena Trybała - Estera
- Piotr Kozłowski - Heniek
- Zbigniew Zamachowski - Ichak Szulc
- Jan Peszek - Max Bauer
- Aleksander Bardini - Adam Czerniaków
- Maria Chwalibóg - Czerniaków's wife
- Andrzej Kopiczyński - director at Polish Radio
- Krystyna Zachwatowicz - Szloma's mother
- Zbigniew Suszyński - student
- Jerzy Zass - German watchman on the bridge
- Wojciech Klata - Szloma
- Michał Staszczak - Józek
- Agnieszka Krukówna - Ewka (as Agnieszka Kruk)
- Anna Mucha - Sabinka

== Reception ==
Among the strongest advocates of the film was Marek Edelman, the Polish Jew who survived the Warsaw Ghetto Uprising. Wajda saw the idea of showing the children being led into the Treblinka gas chambers as unnecessary addition of tearjerking moments. Annette Insdorf, a film scholar and strong supporter of Wajda, considers Korczak to be a masterpiece alongside Wajda's own Ashes and Diamonds, in her commentary of Criterion Collection's DVD release of Wajda's War Trilogy.

== See also ==
- List of submissions to the 63rd Academy Awards for Best Foreign Language Film
- List of Polish submissions for the Academy Award for Best Foreign Language Film
