= Jan Łomnicki =

Polish film director (1929–2002)

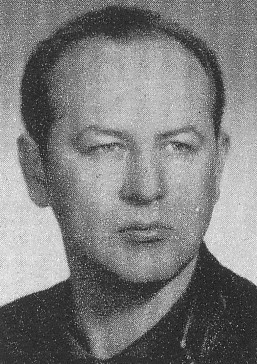
- Born: 30 June 1929; Podhajce, Poland (now Pidhaitsi, Ukraine)
- Died: 18 December 2002 (aged 73); Warsaw, Poland
- Occupations: Film director, screenwriter
- Years active: 1954-2000

Jan Łomnicki (30 June 1929 – 18 December 2002) was a Polish film director and screenwriter. A graduate of the National Film School in Łódź. He directed more than thirty films between 1954 and 2000. His 1976 film To Save the City (Polish: Ocalić miasto) was awarded at the Polish Film Festival (1976) and was entered into the 10th Moscow International Film Festival (1977).

He was the brother of the actor Tadeusz Łomnicki.

== Filmography ==
- To Save the City (1976)
- Akcja pod Arsenałem (1978)
- Dom (TV series; 1980–2000)
- Modrzejewska (TV series; 1989)
- Just Beyond This Forest (1991)
