= Tczew =

City in Pomeranian Voivodeship, Poland

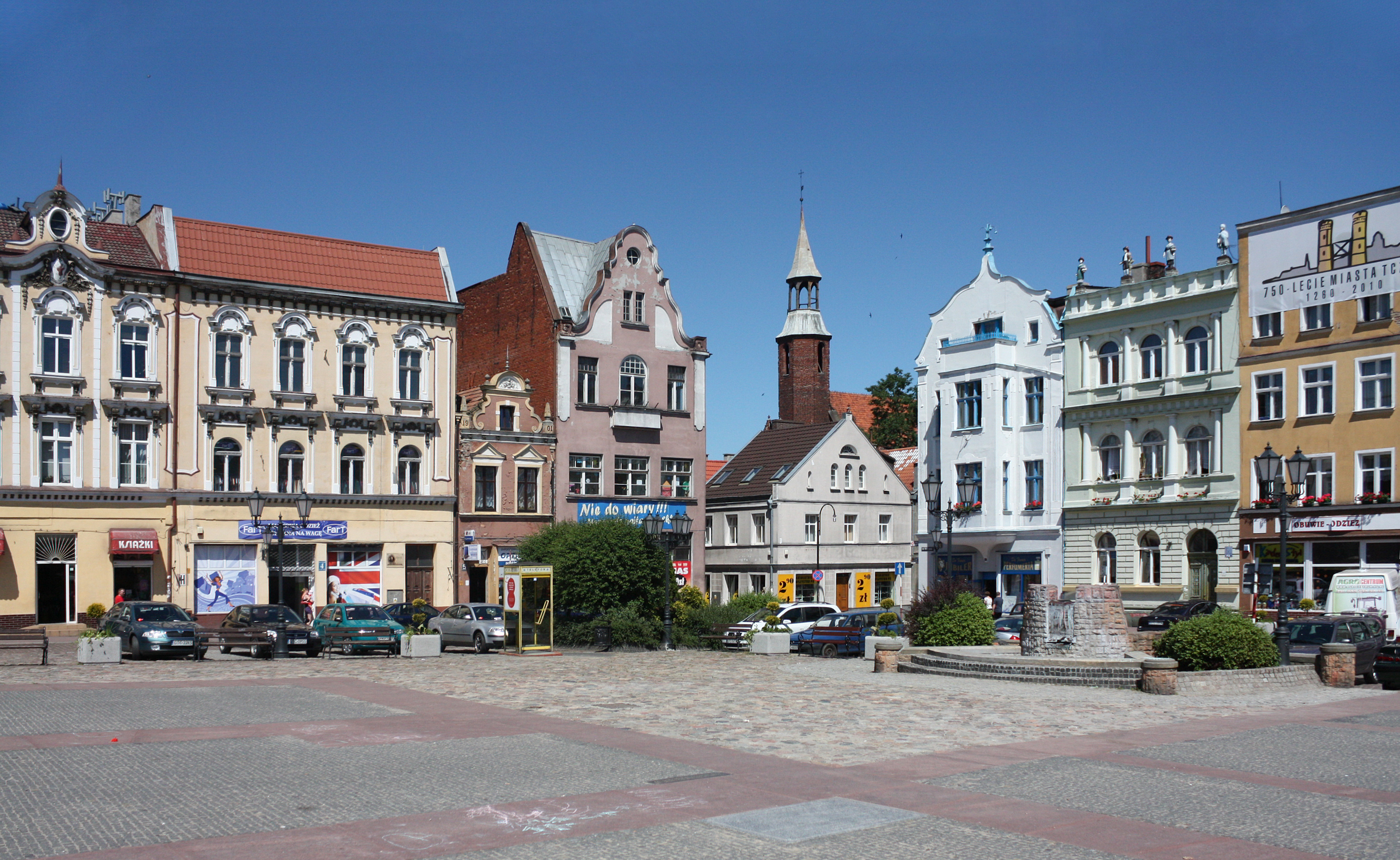
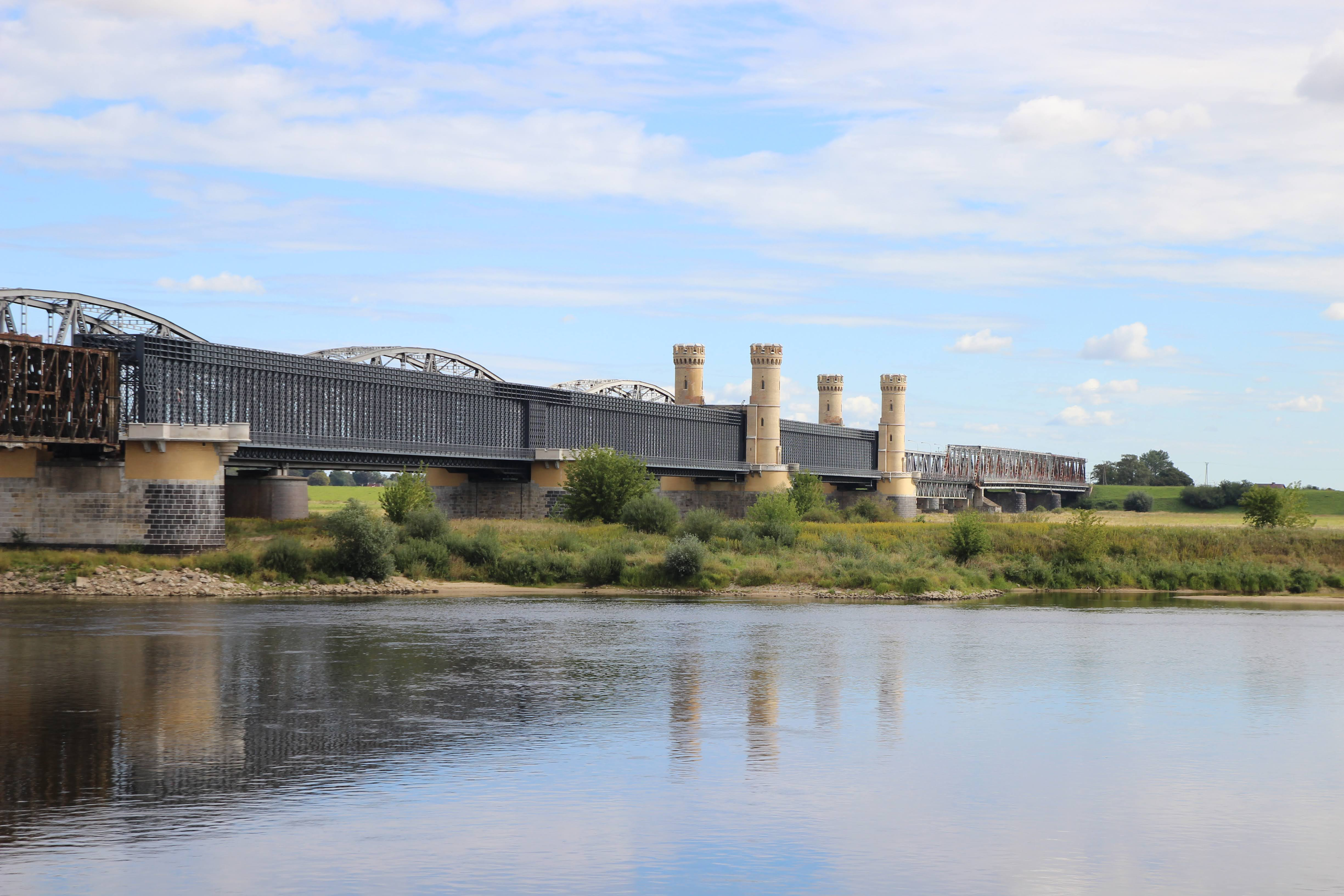
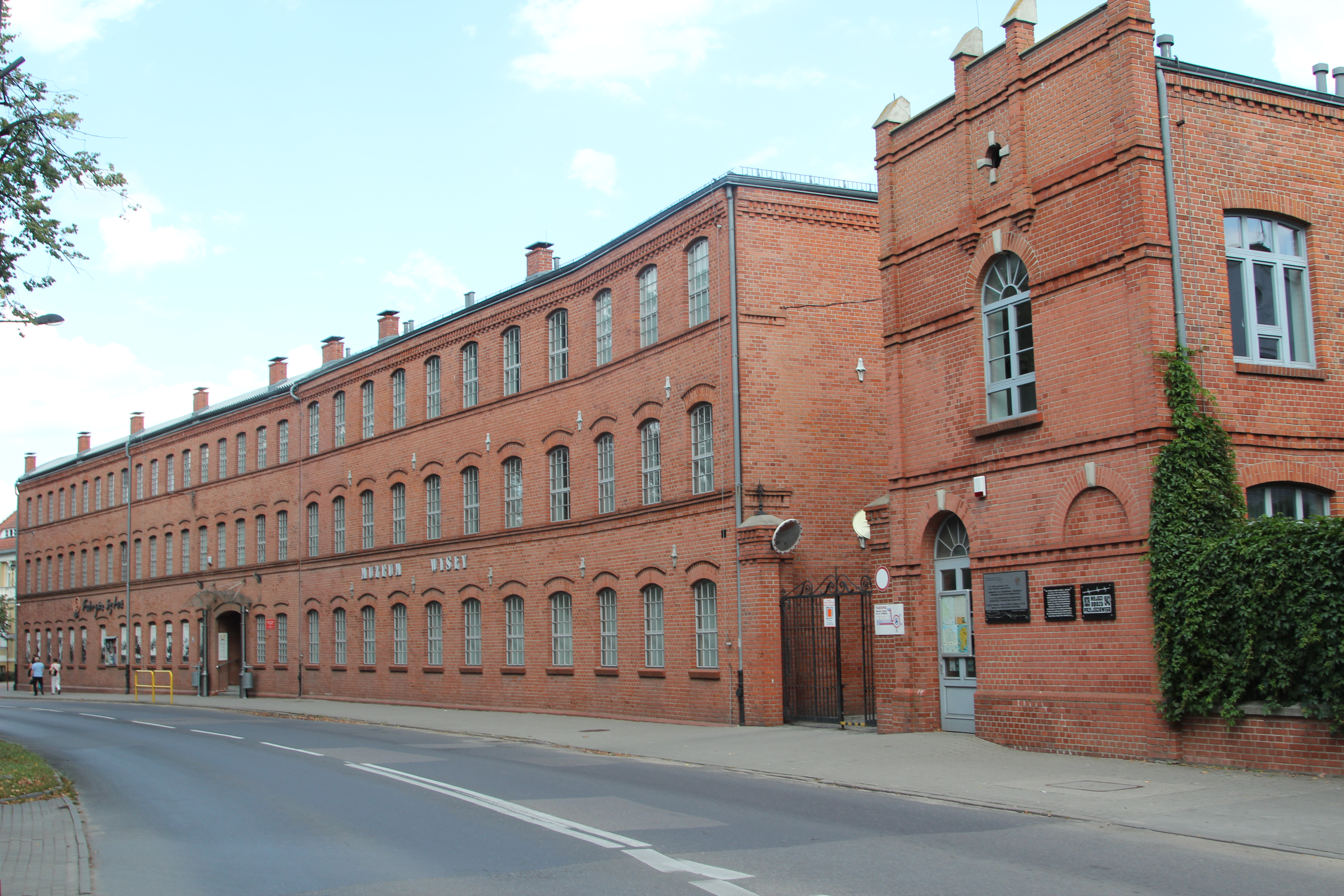
- Market Square Tczew Road Bridge Vistula River Museum

- Flag Coat of arms

- Location within Poland
- Coordinates: 54°5′15″N 18°47′50″E
- Country: Poland
- Voivodeship: Pomeranian
- County: Tczew
- Gmina: Tczew (urban municipality)
- Established: 12th century
- City rights: 1260

Government
  - City mayor: Łukasz Brządkowski

Area
  - Total: 22.26 km^{2} (8.59 sq mi)
- Elevation: 25 m (82 ft)

Population (31 December 2021)
  - Total: 59,111 ▼ (73rd)
  - Density: 2,655/km^{2} (6,878/sq mi)
- Time zone: UTC+1 (CET)
  - Summer (DST): UTC+2 (CEST)
- Postal code: 83-110
- Area code: +48 58
- Car plates: GTC
- Website: https://tczew.pl

Tczew ([tt͡ʂɛf], formerly German: Dirschau) is a city on the Vistula River in the Pomeranian Voivodeship, in northern Poland, with 59,111 inhabitants (December 2021). It is the capital of Tczew County and the largest city of the ethnocultural region of Kociewie within the historic region of Pomerania.

Founded in the Middle Ages with city rights since 1260, Tczew was a major river port on the Vistula, and prospered as a major center for grain trade in Poland. The city is known for its Old Town with medieval Gothic churches, and the Vistula bridges, which played a key role in the Invasion of Poland at the onset of World War II. During the war, it was the location of a major German-operated transit camp for Poles expelled from the region, now home to the Vistula River Museum, the main museum devoted to the history of Poland's longest river.

Tczew is the largest railroad junction in northern Poland, with railroads towards Gdańsk, Bydgoszcz, Warsaw and Chojnice, and a location for the electric machinery and food industries.

== Geographical location ==
Tczew is located on the west bank of river Vistula, approximately 30 kilometres (19 miles) south of Gdańsk Bay at the Baltic Sea and 35 kilometres (22 miles) south-east of Gdańsk.

== History ==
=== Middle Ages ===
Tczew (Trsow, Dersowe, ‘weaver's town’) was first mentioned as Trsow in a document by Pomeranian Duke Grzymisław bestowing the land to the Knights Hospitaller in 1198. Around 1200 Sambor I, Duke of Pomerania, built a fortress here. In some documents, the name Derszewo appears, which stems from the name of a feudal lord, Dersław. It is unknown whether Trsow and Derszewo referred to the same or two neighboring settlements. In order to obtain better control of traffic on the Vistula, Pomeranian Duke Sambor II moved his residence from Lubiszewo Tczewskie to Tczew. By 1252 the settlement was known by the names Tczew and Dirschau.

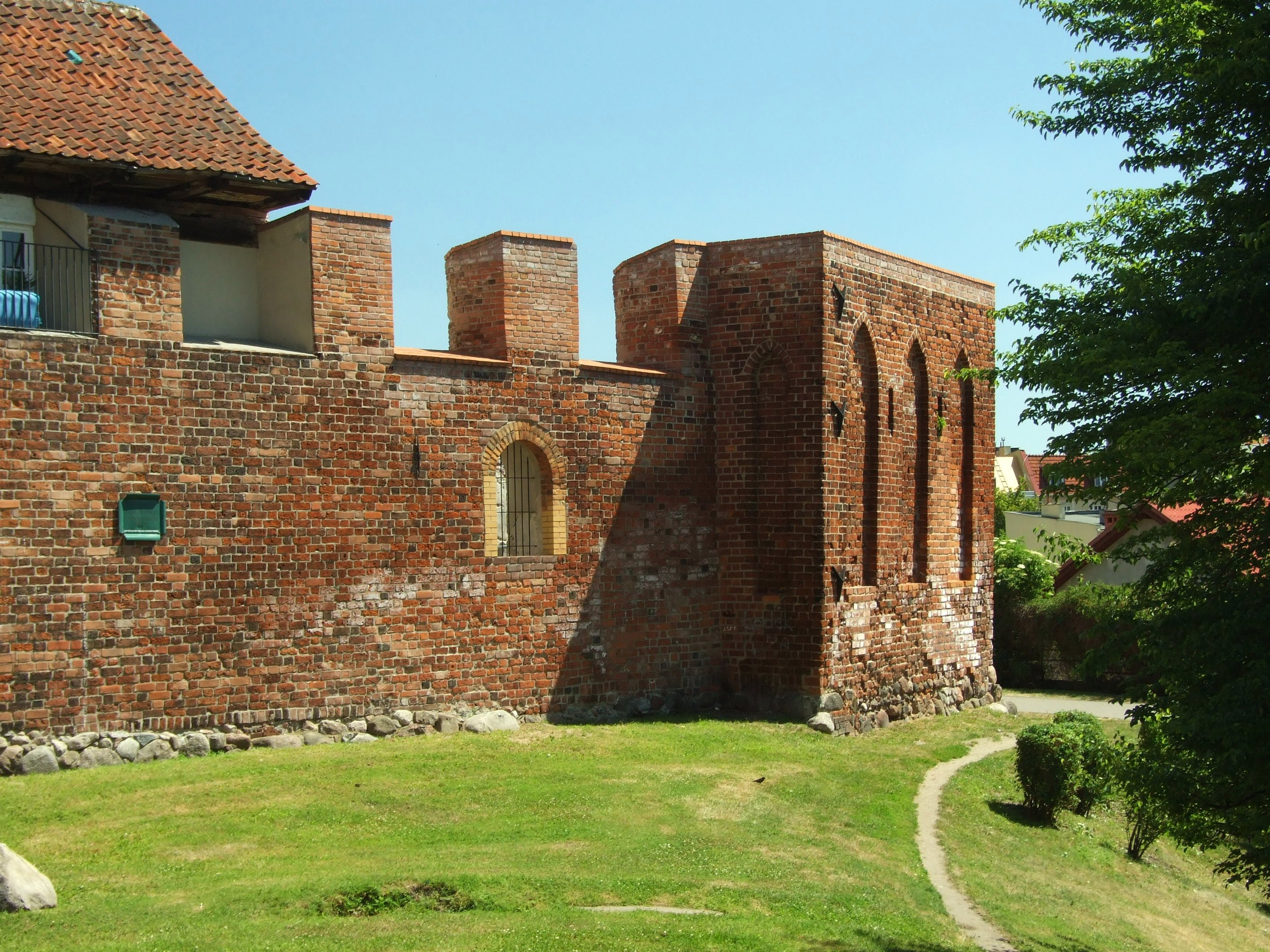
Medieval town walls

In 1258 a city council was created and in 1260 Tczew was granted town rights. It is the only case in Poland for a city council to be established before granting city rights. Craft and trade developed, there was a port on the Vistula and a mint. Duke Mestwin II in 1289 brought the Dominican Order to the city. It was part of Poland until 1308. Following the Treaty of Soldin in 1309, Tczew was purchased from Brandenburg by Heinrich von Plötzke of the Teutonic Knights, despite the fact that the initial claims to the region by Brandenburg were of dubious legality. The townspeople were expelled by the Teutonic Knights and the town's organization ceased to exist for more than half a century. It was rebuilt from 1364 to 1384, and was granted Kulm law by Winrich von Kniprode. After the Polish victory in the Battle of Grunwald in 1410, the town was briefly recaptured by Poland. In 1434 the town was burnt down by the Hussites. In 1440 the town joined the Prussian Confederation, opposing Teutonic Order's rule. In 1457, during the Thirteen Years’ War, Bohemian mercenaries on the Order's service sold Tczew to Poland in lieu of indemnities. The Second Peace of Thorn (1466) confirmed the reincorporation of Tczew to Poland. It became a county seat within the Pomeranian Voivodeship in the newly created Polish province of Royal Prussia, soon also part of the Greater Poland Province.

=== Modern era ===
During the Protestant Reformation most of the town's inhabitants converted to Lutheranism. In 1626, it was occupied by king Gustav II Adolf of Sweden, who built a pontoon bridge across river Vistula and who had his camp at the southern side of the town. After the war Tczew was visited twice by Polish King Władysław IV Vasa, in 1634/1635 and 1636. Although it was rebuilt, it then suffered during the Polish-Swedish Wars. In a nearby battle on 2 September 1657, the Poles were defeated by the combined troops of Brandenburg and Sweden under general Josias II, Count of Waldeck-Wildungen.

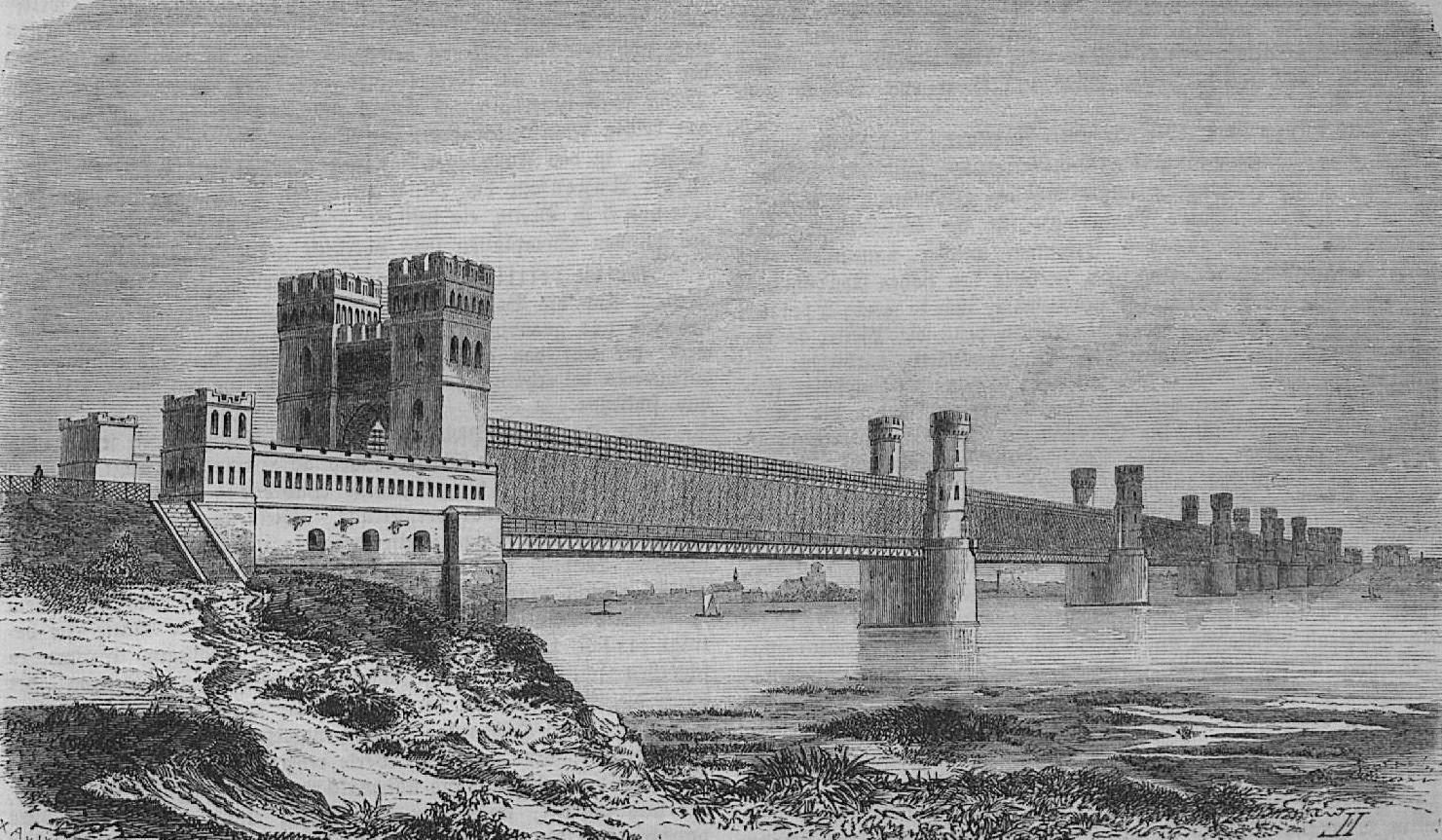
The bridge over Vistula in 1858

The region was annexed from the Polish–Lithuanian Commonwealth by the Kingdom of Prussia during the First Partition of Poland in 1772. Tczew, as Dirschau, became part of the newly founded Province of West Prussia. During the Napoleonic Wars and the Polish national liberation fights the town was captured by Polish troops of General Jan Henryk Dąbrowski in 1807, but became Prussian again in 1815. In 1818 Prussians closed down the Dominican monastery. In October and November 1831, some Polish infantry, cavalry and artillery units of the November Uprising stopped in the city on the way to their internment places, and later on, one of the insurgents' main escape routes from partitioned Poland to the Great Emigration led through the city.

With the unification of Germany, the town became part of the German Empire in 1871 and from 1887 was the capital of the Dirschau district in the province of West Prussia. The town grew rapidly during the 19th century after the opening of the Prussian Eastern Railway line connecting Berlin and Königsberg, with the Vistula bridge near Dirschau being an important part.

Under Prussian and German rule, the Polish population suffered from forced Germanization; for example Poles were denied Polish schools, and refused to teach their children German. The German official Heinrich Mettenmeyer wrote that German-appointed teachers were treated with the highest disdain by Polish children and their parents. The town remained a center of Polish resistance, and Poles established various organizations, including the Bank Ludowy ("People's Bank"). According to the census of 1910, Dirschau had a population of 16,894, of which 15,492 (91.7%) were Germans and 1,397 (8.3%) were Poles.

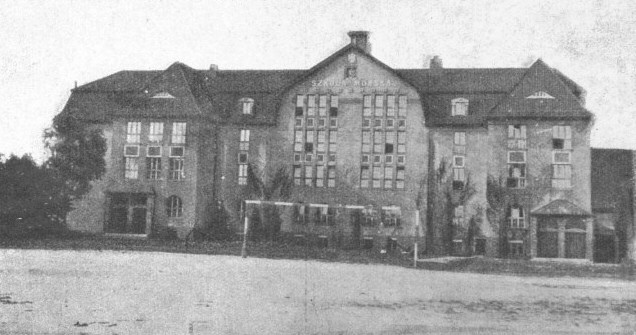
Maritime Academy in Tczew in the 1920s

After Poland regained independence in 1918, local Poles formed the People's Council in preparation for reintegration with Poland. After World War I as a consequence of the Treaty of Versailles, Tczew became part of the so-called Polish Corridor and was incorporated into the re-established Polish state. The official handover happened on January 10, 1920, and on January 30, Polish General Józef Haller arrived in the town with his troops. The town became a center of cultural activities of the German minority in Poland, a German-language school and a theater was founded. The regional member of the Polish Parliament represented the German minority. In this period, the proportion of Germans in the town decreased drastically from over 90% in 1910 to around 9% in 1939. In 1921, Tczew had a population of 16,250, of which 4,600 (28.3%) were Germans.

During the Interwar period, Tczew was famous for its maritime academy (Szkoła Morska) which later moved to Gdynia.

=== World War II ===
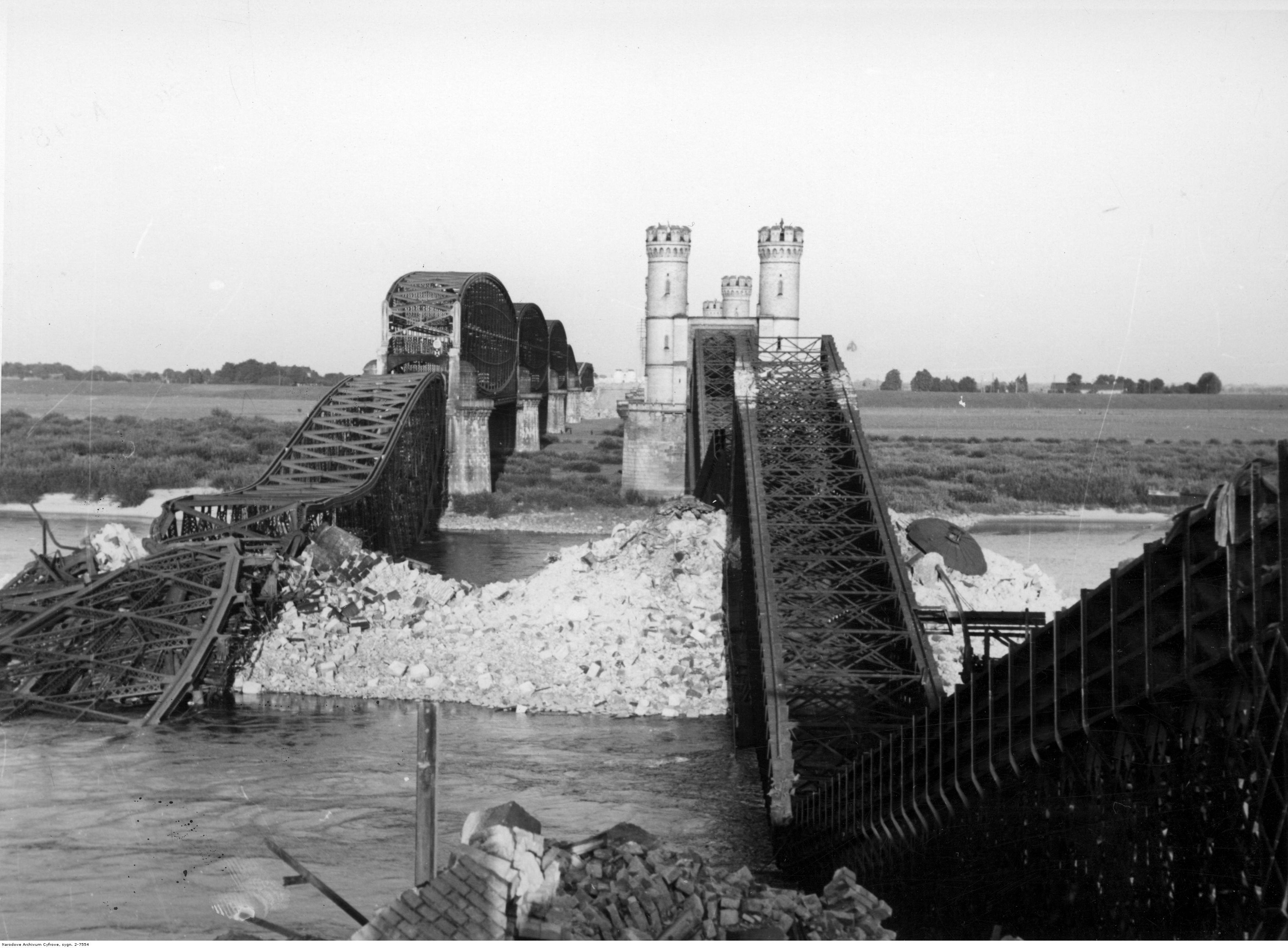
The Vistula bridge demolished by sappers of the Polish Army in September 1939 after the Wehrmacht invasion

According to the city's website, Tczew was the location of the start of World War II when German bombers attacked Polish sapper installations to prevent the bridges from being blown up at 04:34 on 1 September 1939 (the shelling of Westerplatte commenced at 04:45). The Germans sent two trains with soldiers to capture the bridges, disguised as freight trains, but due to Polish railroaders' intervention at Szymankowo, they came late, losing the element of surprise, and the bridges were blown up after 6 am that day.

During the German occupation of Poland (1939–45) Tczew, as Dirschau, was annexed into the newly formed province of Reichsgau Danzig-West Prussia of Nazi Germany. The Polish population was subjected to mass arrests, repressions, expulsions and murder. The SS-Heimwehr-Sturmbann Götze entered the town in September 1939 to carry out actions against Poles, including mass arrests with the help of local Germans organized in the Selbstschutz, who denounced local Polish activists. The Germans imprisoned hundreds of Poles in camps established in a former factory (present-day museum), in a craft school and in military barracks. In November 1939, Germans carried out executions of numerous Poles from Tczew, including local teachers, officials (including pre-war mayor Karol Hempel,) craftsmen, a policeman, and even a seventeen-year-old student. Catholic priests from Pelplin, who were not murdered in Pelplin, were imprisoned in the Tczew barracks and then murdered in the Szpęgawski Forest (see also Nazi persecution of the Catholic Church in Poland). In January 1940, the SS and Selbstschutz carried out two public executions of 33 Polish residents, including railway employees, officials, craftsmen and merchants, at the market square. Also Poles from Starogard and Tuchola counties, who refused to sign the Volksliste, were imprisoned in Tczew and then murdered in a nearby forest. From 1939 to 1941, the Einsatzgruppe operated a penal forced labour camp in the town.

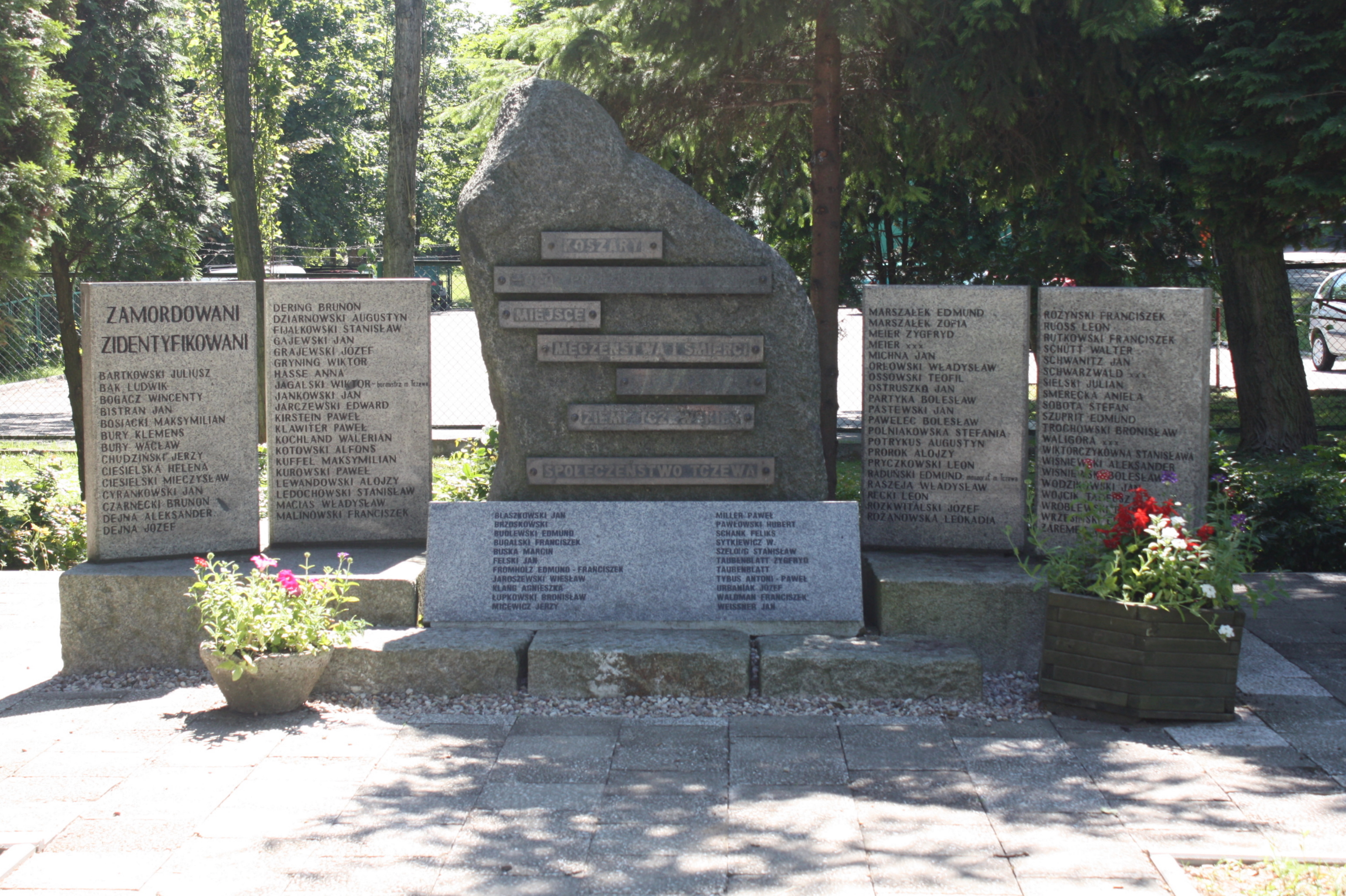
Monument to Poles murdered in Tczew by the Germans during World War II

In 1941, the Germans created a transition camp for Poles expelled from the region in a local factory (present-day museum). People were held there for several weeks, and then expelled to the General Government. Hundreds of Polish inhabitants of Tczew were expelled in 1940 and 1941. Some inhabitants were also deported to forced labour to Germany. In 1943, local Poles managed to save some kidnapped Polish children from the Zamość region, by buying them from the Germans at the local train station.

The Polish resistance was active in the town, including the Union of Armed Struggle-Home Army, the Pomeranian Griffin, Grunwald, Strażnica, Szwadron Śmierci and Military Organization Lizard Union, whose activities included distribution of Polish underground press and spying on German activities in the city and beyond. Polish forced labourers from Tczew continued resistance activity and conducted espionage of German activity also in Riga, Königsberg and Pillau, and Tczew was an important point for the transfer of intelligence gathered by the Polish resistance.

After World War II the town, was one of the most damaged cities of Gdańsk Pomerania. Virtually none of its remaining factories were capable of production. There had been considerable loss of population down to around 18-20 thousand people. Shortly before the end of World War II it was occupied by the Soviet Army. After the end of war the town became part of People's Republic of Poland and renamed Tczew again. German residents were dispossessed and expelled; Polish residents took the first effort of reconstruction, and revitalization.

=== Recent period ===
From 1975 to 1998, it was administratively located in the Gdańsk Voivodeship. In 1984 the Museum of the Vistula River, a branch of the National Maritime Museum in Gdańsk, was opened in the building of the pre-war metal products factory, in which during World War II Germans operated a transit camp for Poles expelled from the region.

Currently, there are several companies in the electrical industry and machine building.

January 30, i.e. the date of Tczew's return to Poland after the partition period, is celebrated as Tczew Day.

=== Number of inhabitants by year ===
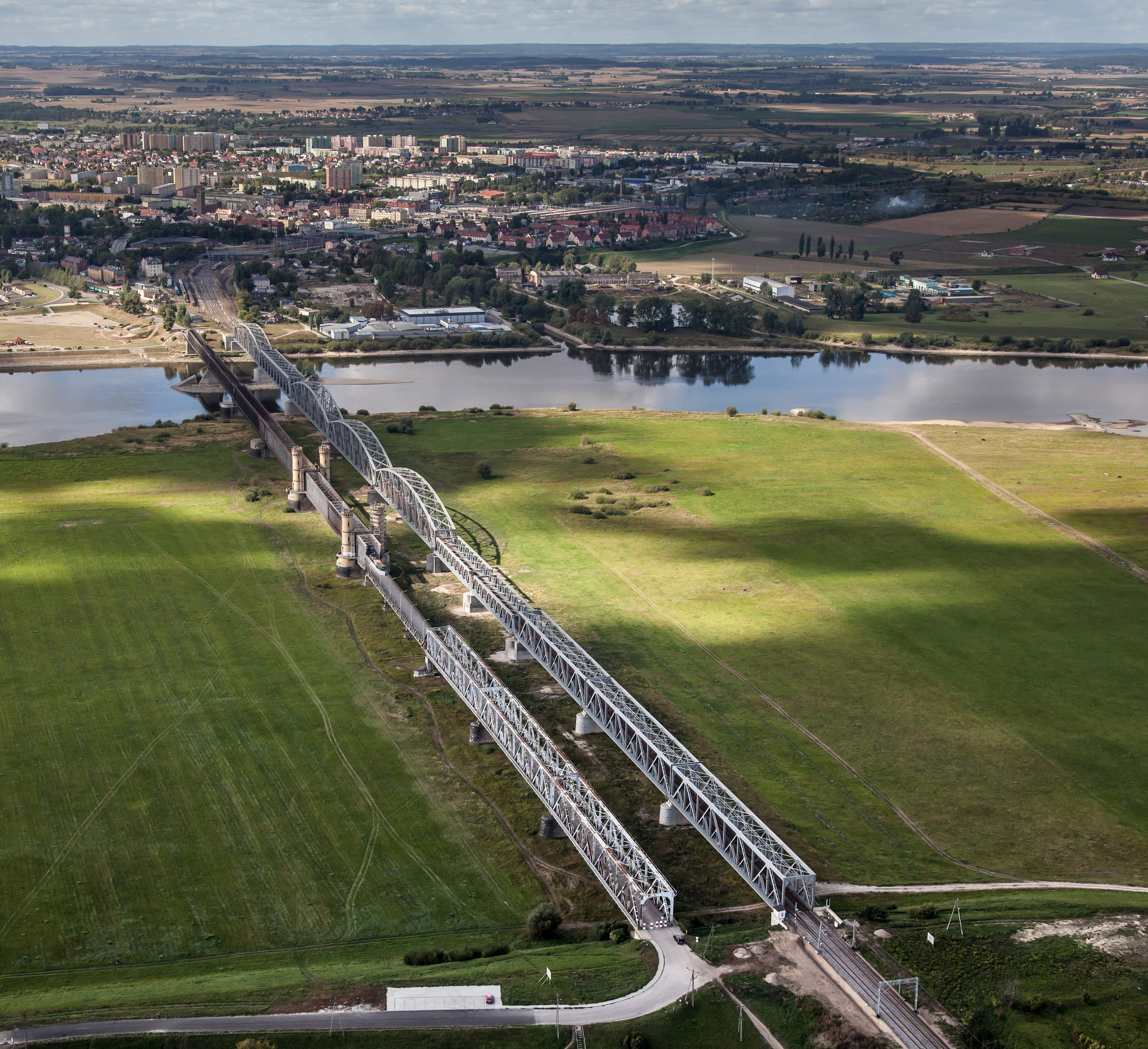
Road and railway bridges on the Vistula river in Tczew

Historical population

Year	Pop.	±%
1772	1,442	—
1782	1,587	+10.1%
1831	2,310	+45.6%
1875	9,713	+320.5%
1880	10,939	+12.6%
1890	11,897	+8.8%
1900	12,808	+7.7%
1905	14,164	+10.6%
1921	16,251	+14.7%
1931	22,758	+40.0%

Year	Pop.	±%
1943	25,869	+13.7%
1950	24,619	−4.8%
1960	33,696	+36.9%
1970	41,100	+22.0%
1980	53,600	+30.4%
1990	59,500	+11.0%
2000	61,200	+2.9%
2009	60,279	−1.5%
2020	59,430	−1.4%

Note that the above table is based on primary sources which may be biased.

== Coat of arms ==
The coat of arms of Tczew depicts a red griffin in honor of Duke Sambor II, who granted the town municipal rights in 1260.

== Sights ==
Sights of Tczew (examples)

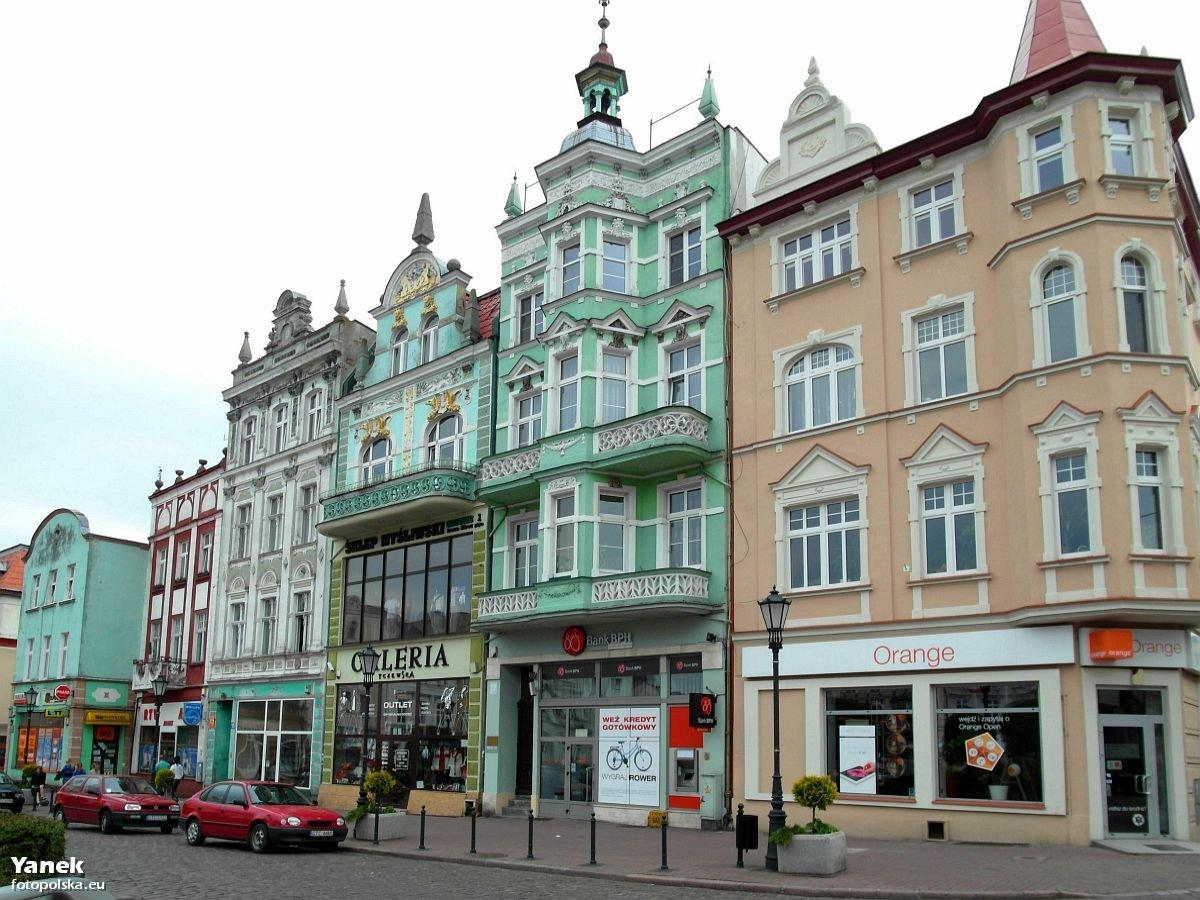
Józef Haller Square

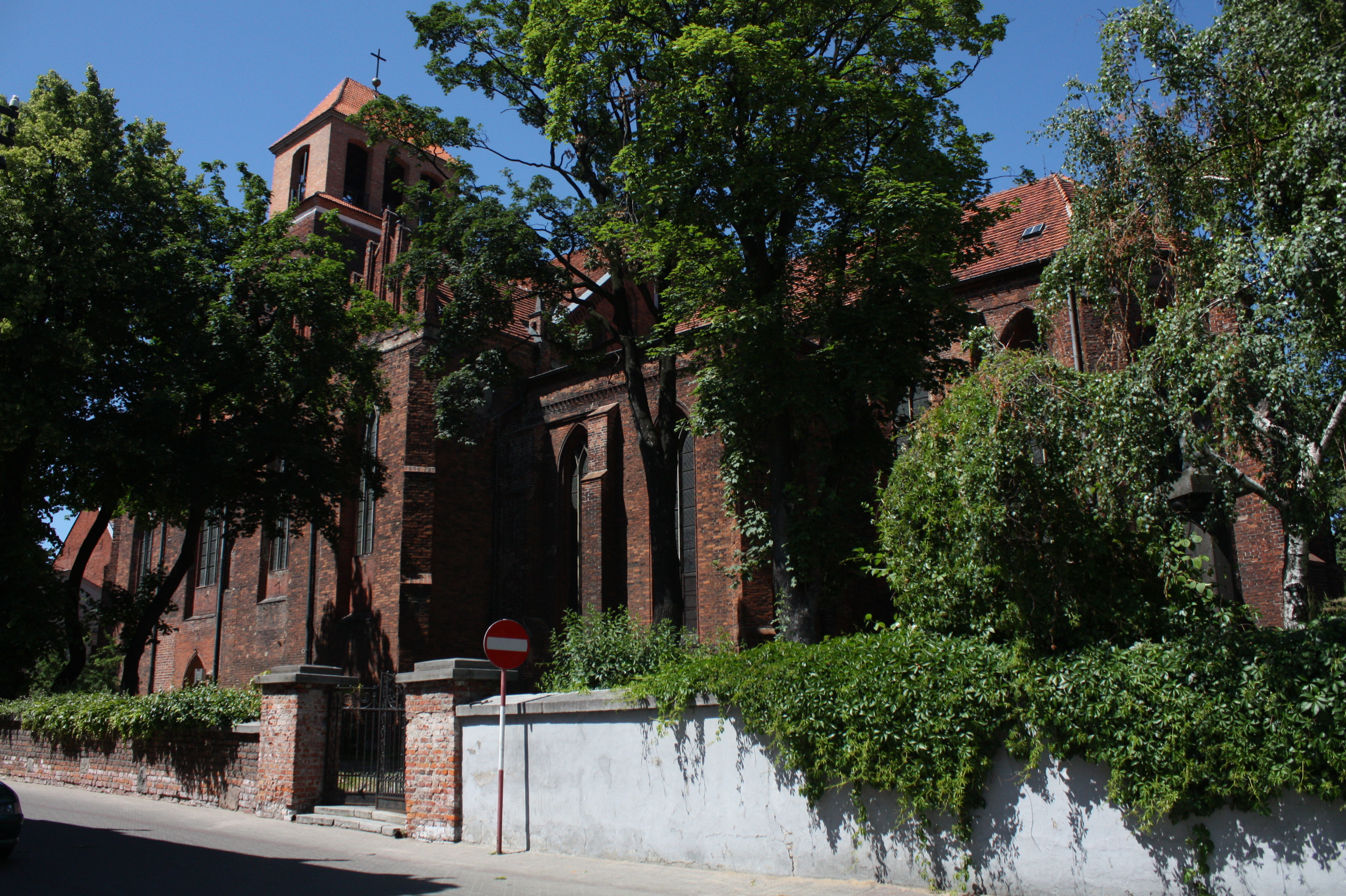
Church of Exaltation of the Cross

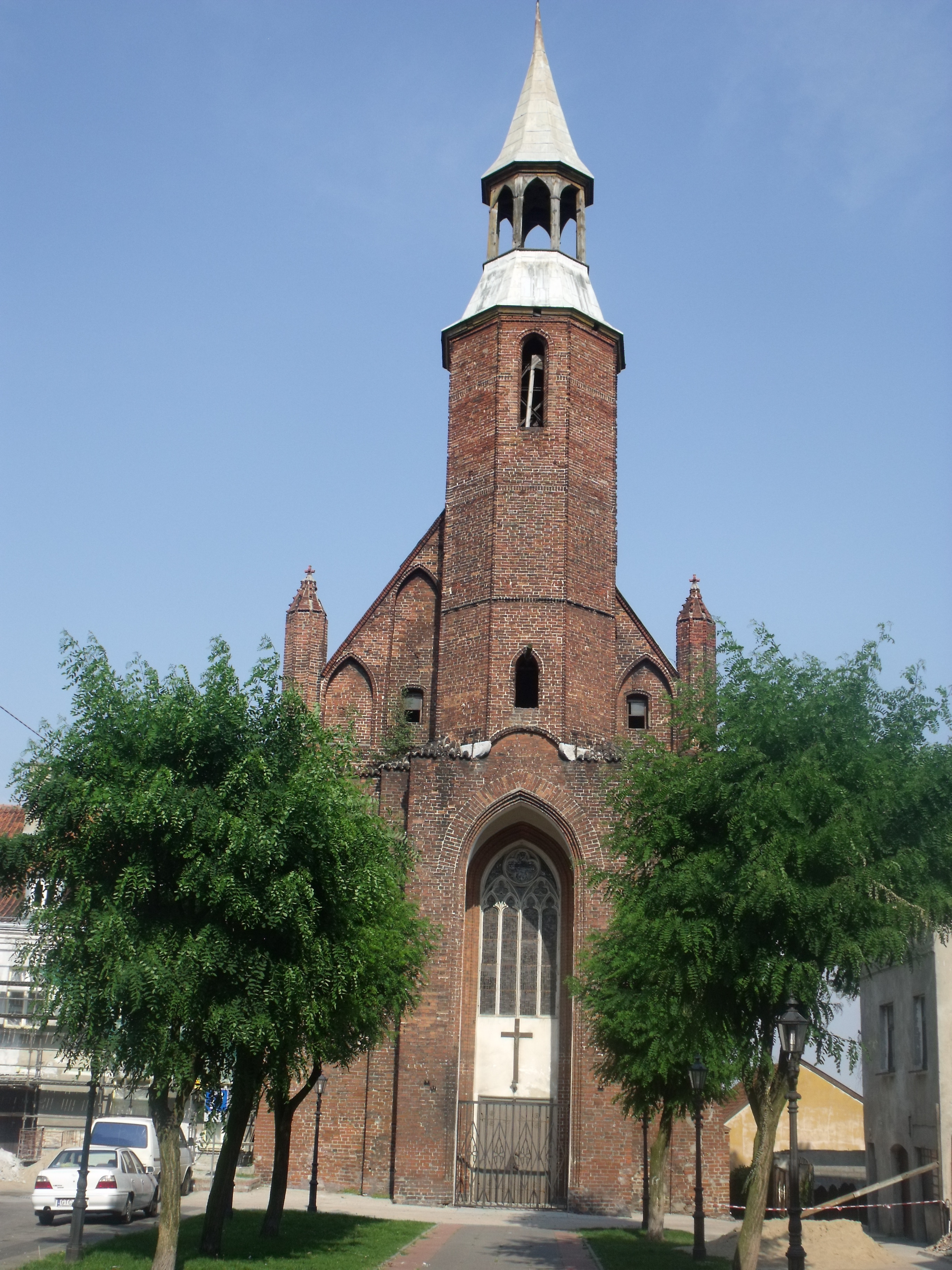
Saint Stanislaus Kostka church

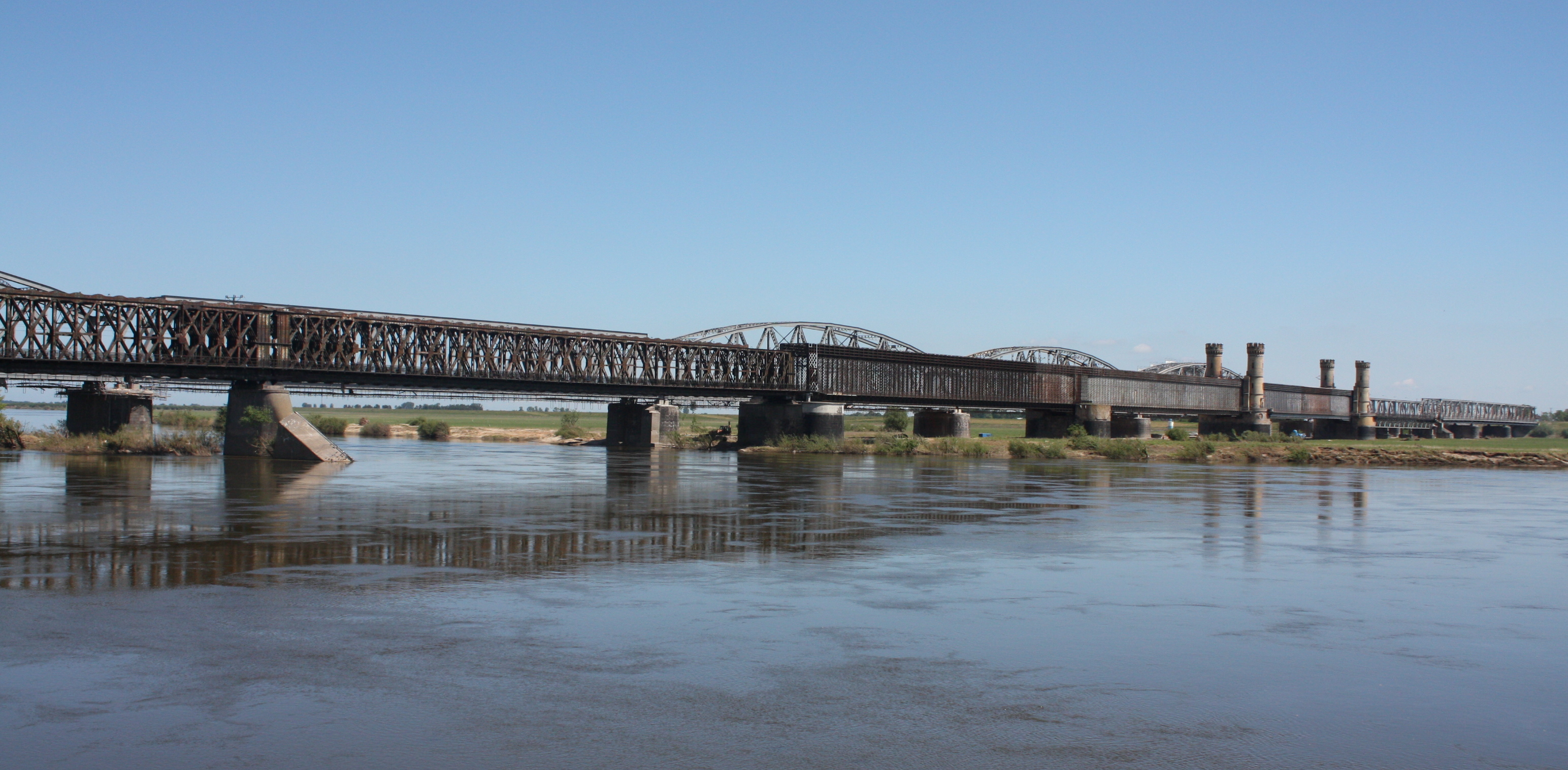
Road bridge

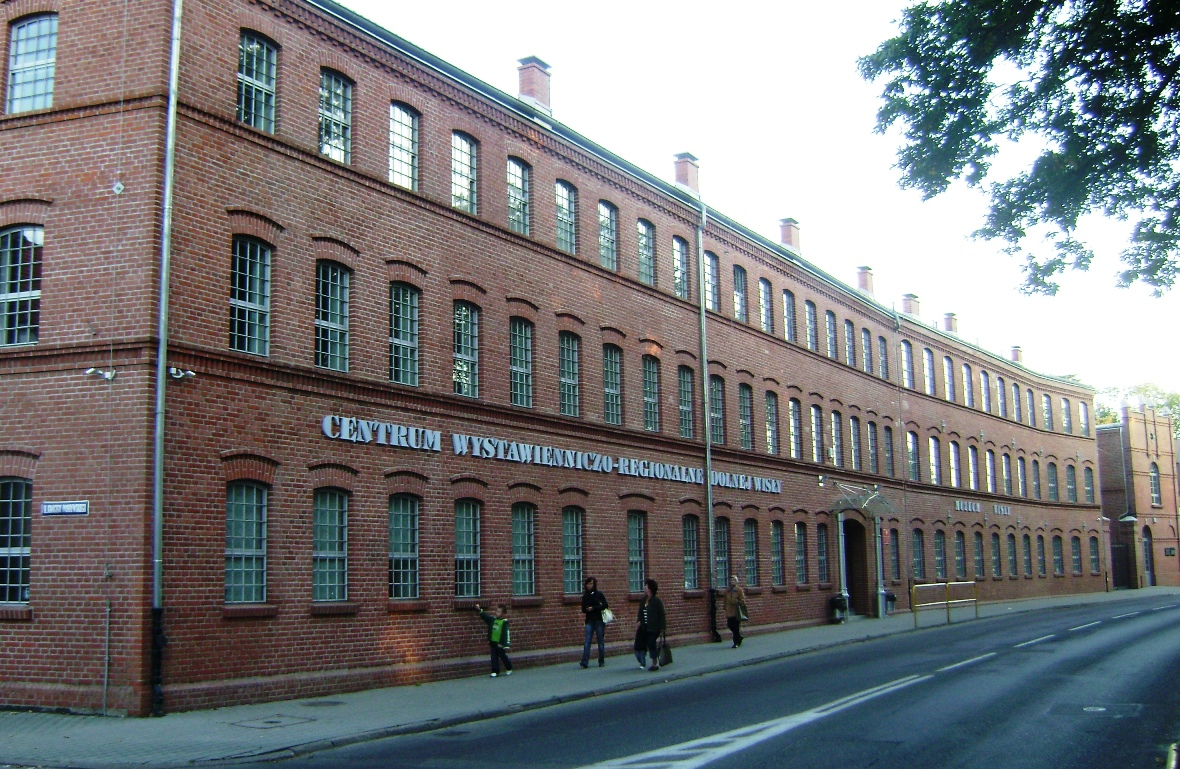
Museum of the Vistula River

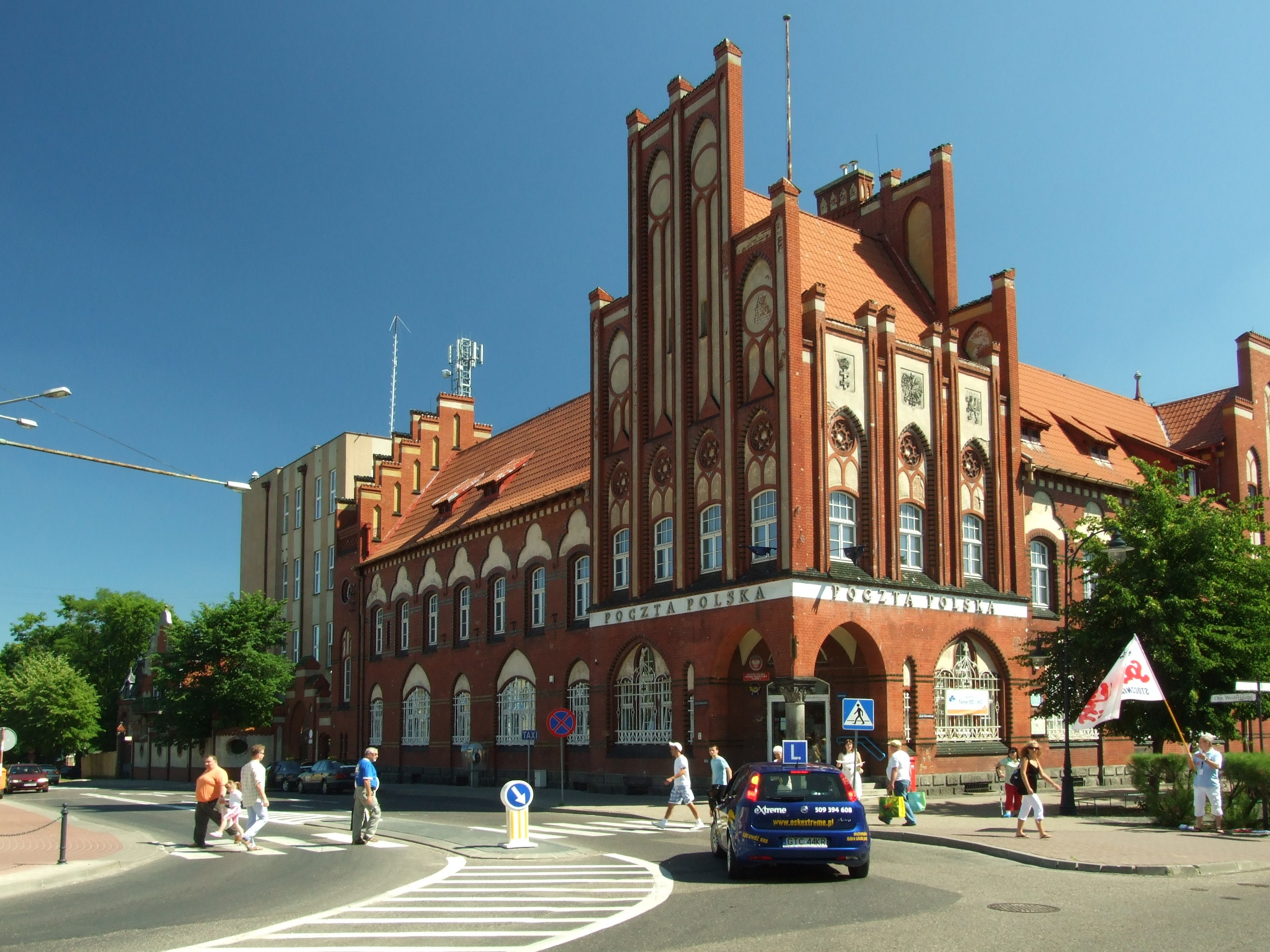
Main post office

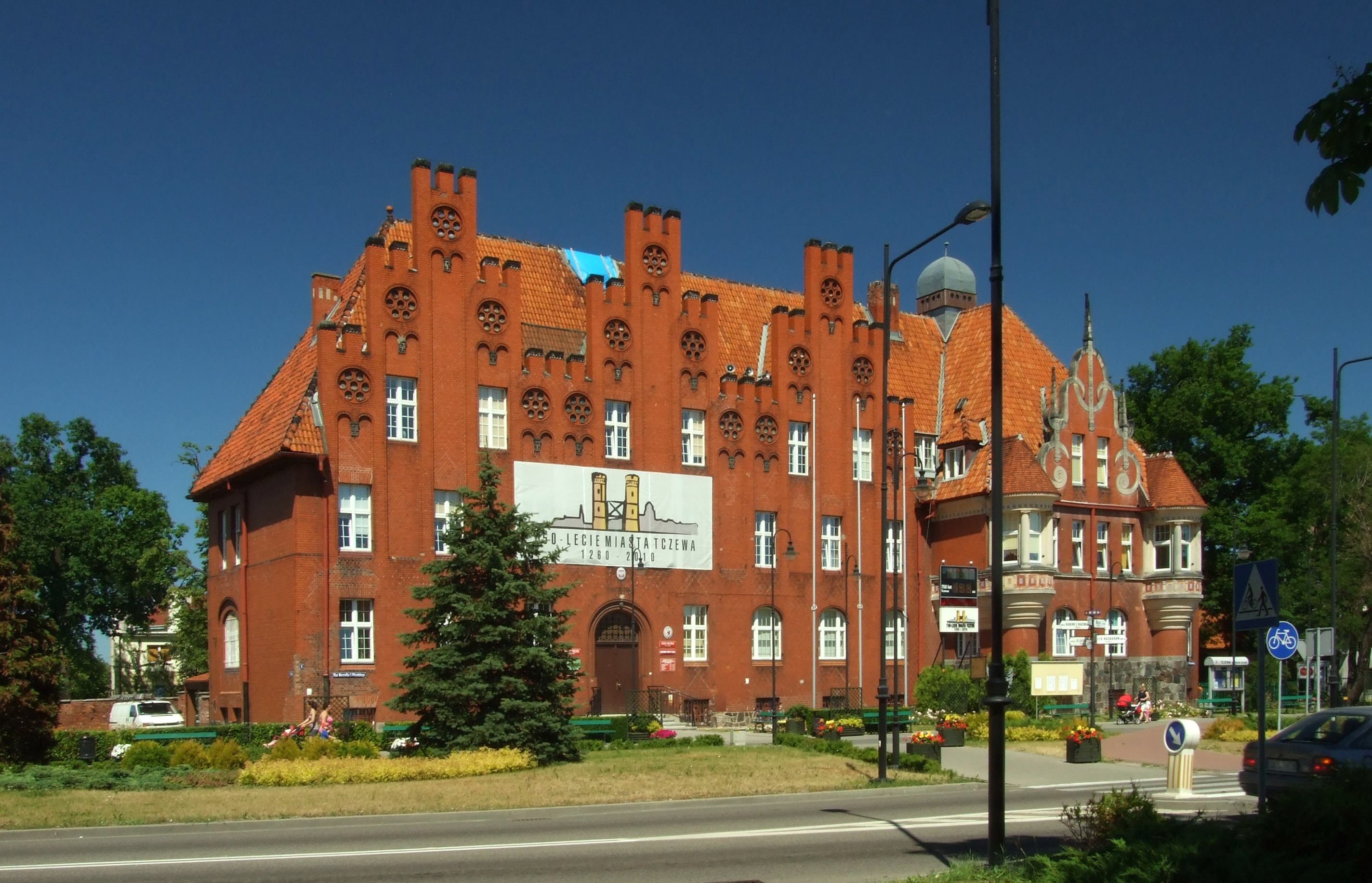
Town Hall

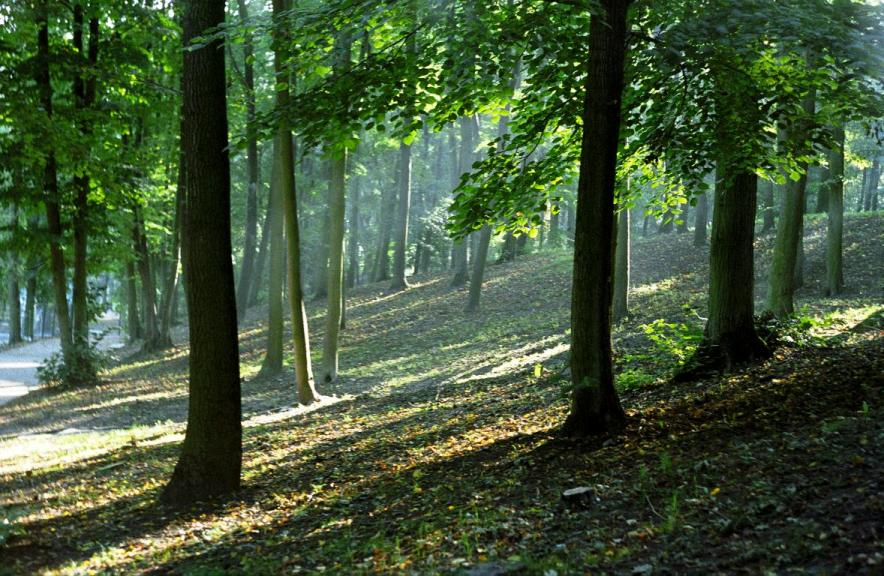
Municipal Park

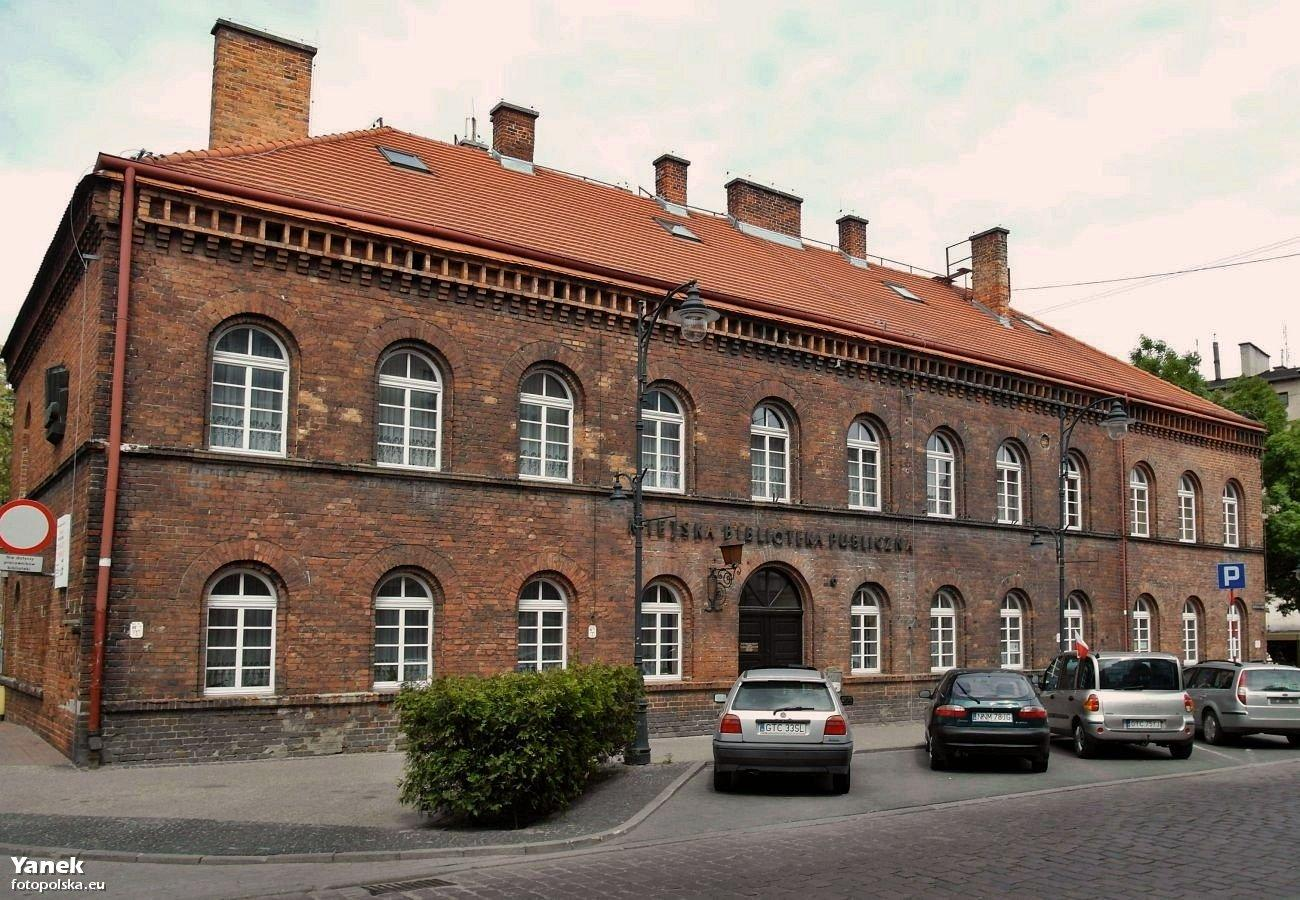
Municipal Public Library

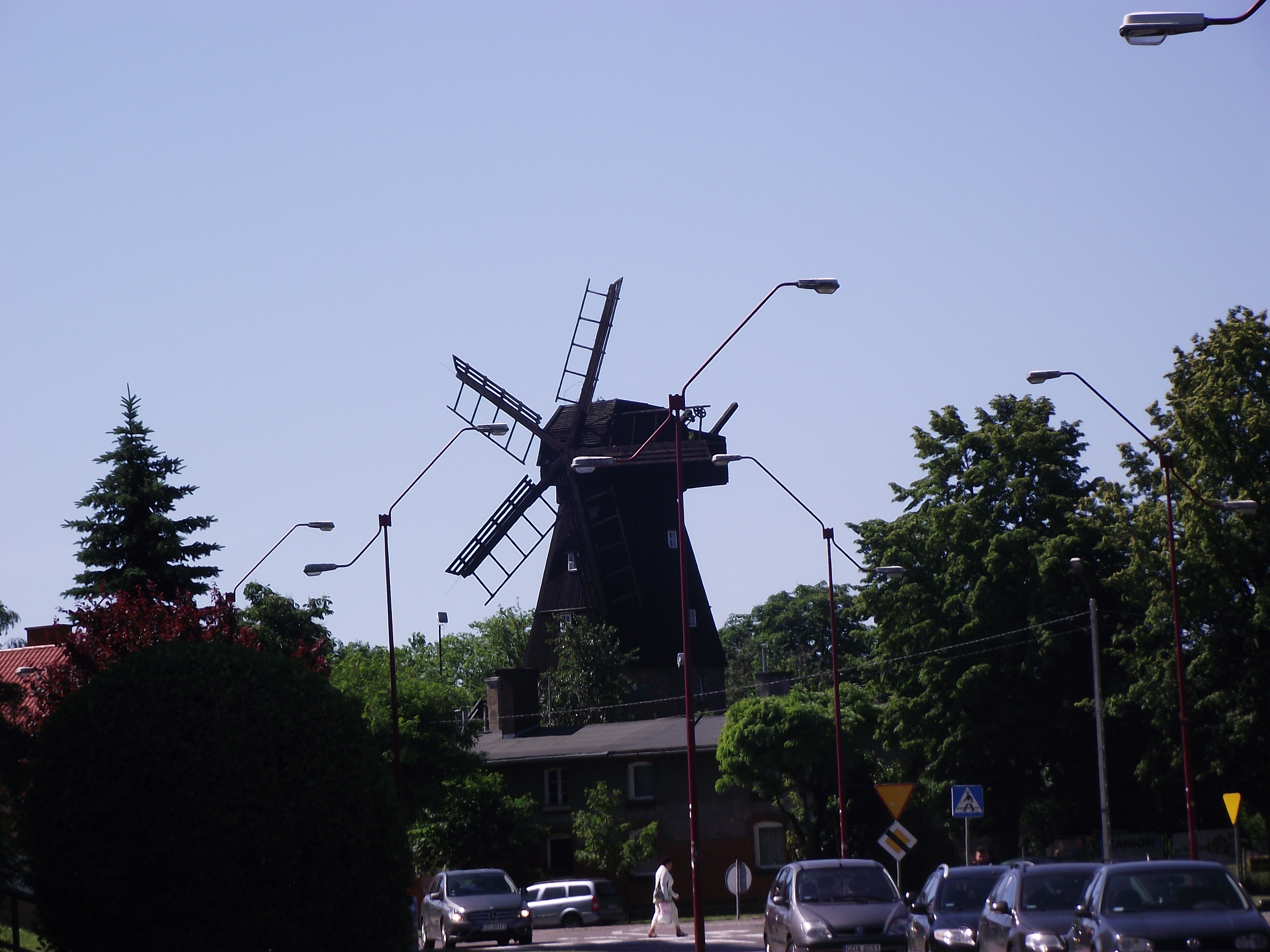
Five-sailed windmill

- Józef Haller Square (Plac Józefa Hallera), filled with preserved historic townhouses
- Parish Church of the Holy Cross – situated in the centre of the Old Town, by Wyszyńskiego street. It is the oldest building in Tczew. The church was built in the 13th century and features a Baroque interior. The high brick tower is the oldest part of the church and its wooden top was destroyed during the fire in 1982. The interior church walls feature old frescoes, the oldest of which dates back to the latter half of the 15th century.
- Post-Dominican Church of Saint Stanislaus Kostka – located on Świętego Grzegorza square. It comes from the 14th century and is built in the Gothic style, with a characteristic octagonal tower. After the liquidation of the order, it was rebuilt into a school and later, until 1945, used by Protestants.
- Bridges on the Vistula River – located by Jana z Kolna street and the Vistula boulevard are Tczew's main sights. The road bridge was the first one to be constructed, between 1851 and 1857. At the time, with its 837 metres’ length, it was one of the longest bridges in the world. Originally, the bridge had ten towers and two gateways – today only four towers remain. The other, railway bridge, was built between 1888 and 1890, when one bridge was no longer sufficient. On 1 September 1939 at 5:30AM, the bridges were destroyed by Polish sappers in order to prevent the German Army from accessing the city from the other side of the Vistula River. The bridges were rebuilt in 1940 and destroyed again in 1945 by the Germans. The final reconstruction of the bridges took place between 1958 and 1959.
- Museum of the Vistula River – situated by 30 Stycznia street, in the pre-war agricultural machine factory where during World War II, a transitional camp for Poles expelled from the region was established and operated by Nazi Germany. Then, the gas-meter factory operated in the building and after this the first museum of the Vistula River was established. In 2007, the building was renovated and now operates as the Museum of the Vistula River and Regional Centre of the Lower Vistula. It is a branch of the National Maritime Museum in Gdańsk.
- Water Tower – located on the corner of 30 Stycznia and Bałdowska streets. It was built in 1905. The water tower presents former architectural style of municipal facilities. The 40-metre-high tower with the power of natural pressure distributed the water to the houses.
- Town Hall – the old town hall was situated in Hallera square, in the centre of the Old Town. It was destroyed during the fire in 1916 and has never been rebuilt since. Now only the outline of the former town hall can be seen in the square. The new town hall was built in the Piłsudskiego square in the early 20th century.
- Dutch-type windmill – situated by Wojska Polskiego street. It was built in 1806. The windmill is wooden with brick foundations and has rarely seen five sails and a rotary head.
- Post Office – situated on the corner of Dąbrowskiego and Obrońców Westerplatte streets. It is the oldest post office in Tczew, built in 1905. On the front wall we can see the crests of Gdańsk and Tczew and also the Polish state emblem.
- The building of former Naval School – located by Szkoły Morskiej street. Built in 1911. In the beginning, the girls’ school was situated there and later, between 1920 and 1930, it was the location of the first naval school in Poland which was later moved to Gdynia. Nowadays, the building houses a secondary school.
- The building of former municipal baths – situated on Łazienna street. Built in 1913. Now the powiat council is based in this building.
- Municipal Park – located in the centre of Tczew, between Kołłątaja, Bałdowska, and Sienkiewicza streets occupies the area of 37 acres (15 ha). The lower part of the park arose in the second part of the 19th century, the upper part in the 20th century. In the park you can see an amphitheatre where, during the summer, many concerts take place. By the entrance to the park a monument of Tczew's scouts killed during the World War II is situated.

== Transport ==
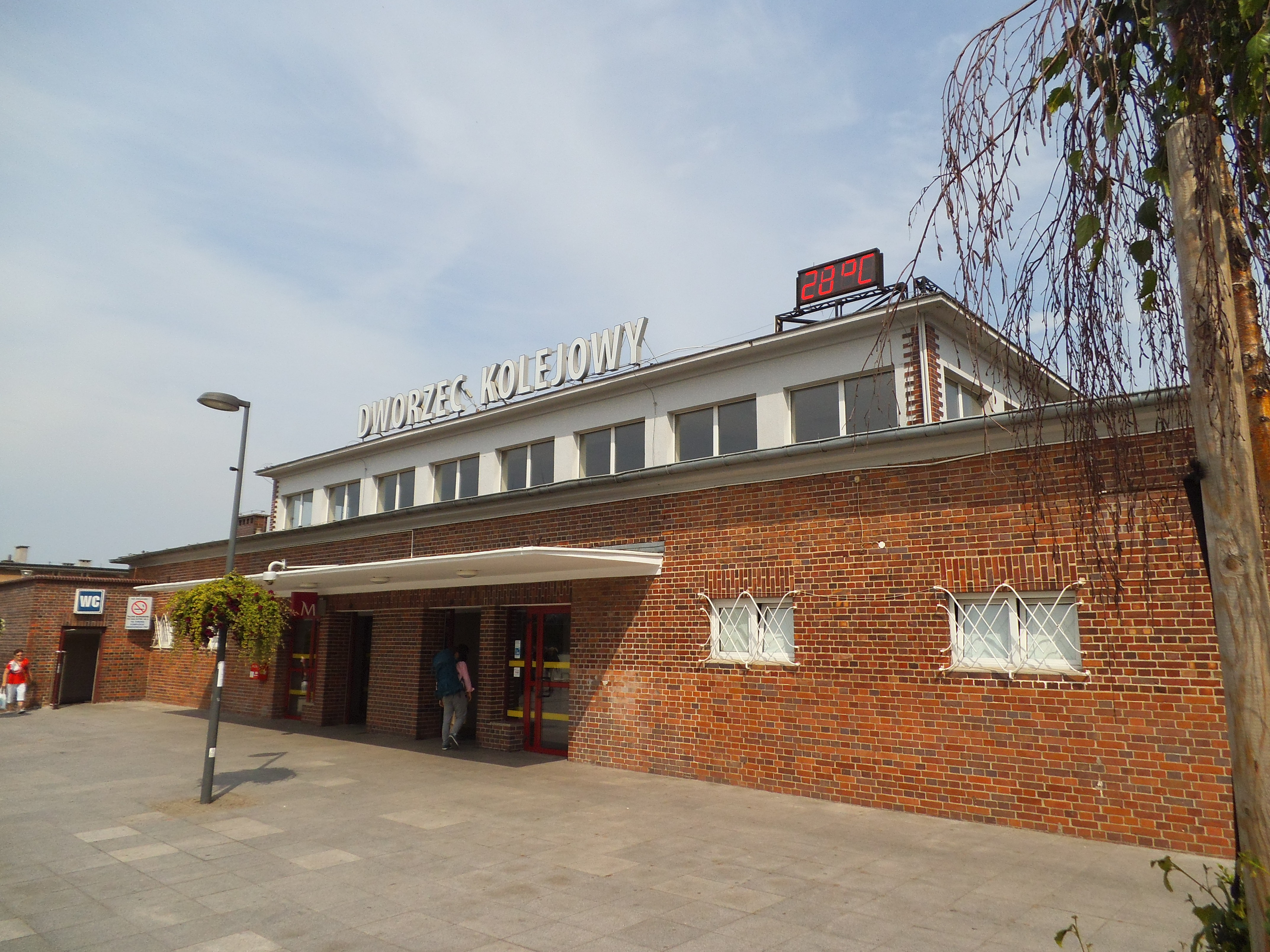
Tczew train station

The Tczew train station is an important railway junction with a classification yard. The Polish A1 motorway runs nearby, west of the city.

== Sports ==
Sports clubs in Tczew include Pogoń Tczew and Gryf Tczew (football), Unia Tczew (football and rowing), Wisła Tczew (football and boxing) and Sambor Tczew (handball, athletics and swimming).

== English Language Camp ==
For the last 19 years, the town has been the host location for the annual English Language Camp. The camp, often nicknamed "Camp Tczew" is hosted by the American-Polish Partnership for Tczew and offers students a three-week program where they have the opportunity to interact with Americans and improve their English.

== Notable people ==
- Alexander von Suchten (1520–1575), German alchemist, doctor and writer
- Johann Reinhold Forster (1729–1798), Reformed (Calvinist) pastor and naturalist, contributed to early ornithology
- Bernhard Kamnitzer (1890–1959), German jurist and Senator of the Free City of Danzig
- Alfred Eisenstaedt (1898–1995), German-born American photographer and photojournalist
- Roman Korynt (1929–2018), footballer, played 327 games for Lechia Gdańsk and 32 for Poland
- Kazimierz Zimny (1935–2022), athlete, competed at the 1960 Summer Olympics
- Teresa Budzisz-Krzyżanowska (born 1942), stage and film actress
- Grzegorz Kołodko (born 1949), professor of economics, former deputy Prime Minister and Minister of Finance
- Barbara Wenta-Wojciechowska (born 1953), rower, competed in the 1976 Summer Olympics
- Janusz Akermann (born 1957), painter and Professor of Fine Arts in Gdańsk
- Grzegorz Ciechowski (1957–2001), singer, composer, record producer, leader of Republika
- Czesława Kościańska (born 1959), rower, competed in the 1980 Summer Olympics
- Krzysztof Kosedowski (born 1960), boxer, bronze medallist at the 1980 Summer Olympics
- Leon Koźmiński (1904–1993), economist and academic, Home Army member
- Wojciech Wentura (born 1972), musician, actor, composer, pianist and Polish Operatic tenor
- Jarosław Kukowski (born 1972), contemporary painter dealing with moral and social issues
- Kornelia Stawicka (born 1973), swimmer, competed in the 1988 Summer Olympics
- Sebastian Wenta (born 1975), shot putter, strongman and Highland Games competitor
- Zbigniew Grzybowski (born 1976), footballer
- Zbigniew Robert Promiński (born 1978), black/death metal drummer
- Michał Zblewski (born 1980), bobsledder competed in the 2010 Winter Olympics
- Piotr Trochowski (born 1984), footballer, 280 pro games and 35 for Germany
- Bartosz Piasecki (born 1986), Norwegian fencer
- Paweł Wszołek (born 1992), footballer, over 200 pro games and 11 for Poland
- Agnieszka Buczyńska (born 1986), politician

== Twin towns – sister cities ==
Tczew is twinned with:

- Witten, Germany (1990)
- Lev HaSharon, Israel (1997)
- Biržai, Lithuania (1998)
- Werder, Germany (1998)
- Barking and Dagenham, England, United Kingdom (1999)
- Dębno, Poland (2000)
- Beauvais, France (2005)
- Chornomorsk, Ukraine (2006)
- Aizkraukle, Latvia (2007)

Former twin towns:

- Kursk, Russia (1996–2022)
- Slutsk, Belarus (2017–2022)

On 8 March 2022, Tczew ended its partnership with the Russian city of Kursk and the Belarusian city of Slutsk as a response to the 2022 Russian invasion of Ukraine.

== See also ==
- Execution of Tczew hostages
