= Teresa Budzisz-Krzyżanowska =

Polish actress

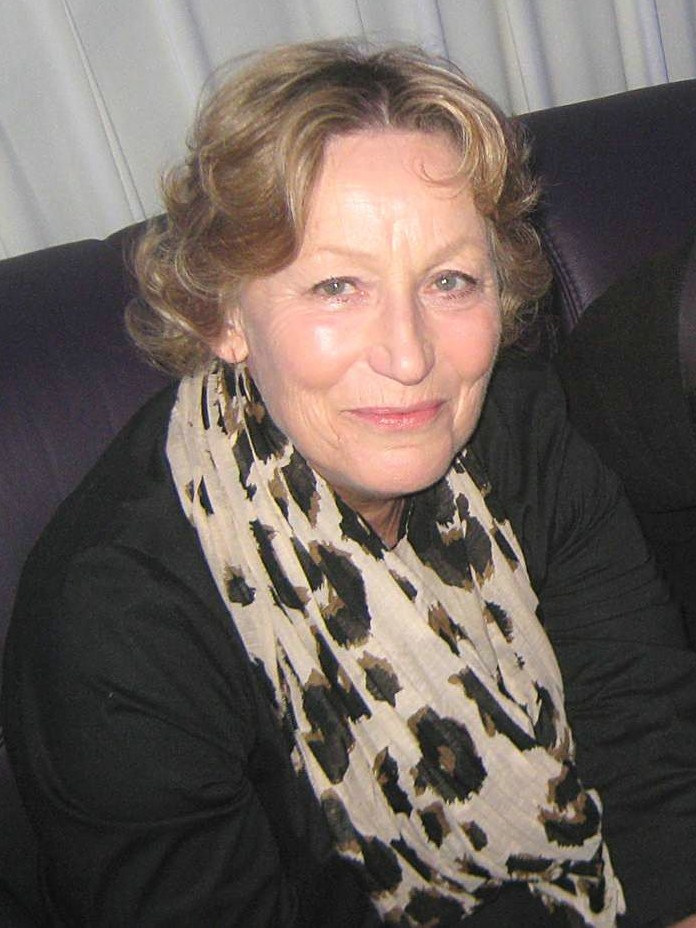
- Teresa Budzisz-Krzyżanowska
- Born: 17 September 1942 (age 83); Dirschau, Reichsgau Danzig-West Prussia, German Reich
- Occupation: Actress
- Years active: 1964–present

Teresa Budzisz-Krzyżanowska (born 17 September 1942) is a Polish stage and film actress. She has appeared in more than forty films since 1972.

She has performed at the Bagatela Theatre in Kraków, Juliusz Słowacki Theatre in Kraków, National Helena Modrzejewska Old Theatre in Kraków, Studio Theatre in Warsaw and National Theatre in Warsaw.

== Selected filmography ==
Film
Year	Title	Role	Notes
2010	Venice		
1994	Faustina		
1994	Three Colors: White		
1990	Korczak		
1989	A Tale of Adam Mickiewicz's 'Forefathers' Eve'		
1976	To Save the City		

== Awards and honours ==
- 2005 - Gold Medal for Merit to Culture - Gloria Artis
- 2014 - Wielki Splendor (Polish Radio Theatre Award)
