= Alexander von Suchten =

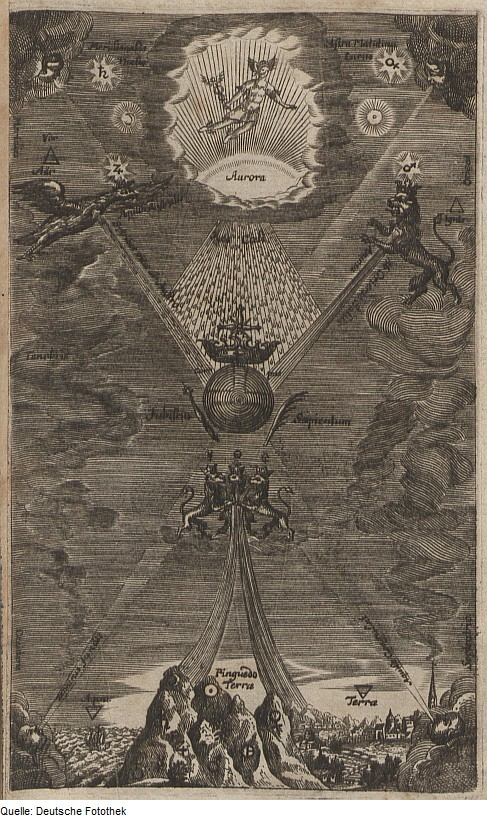

Alexander von Suchten (c. 1520 in Dirschau (Tczew) or Danzig (Gdańsk) – 7 November 1575 in Linz) was an alchemist, doctor and writer.

== Life ==
Relatively little is known about Suchten's life. His parents were Georg von Suchten and Euphemia Schultz. The Suchten family (in Polish "Suchta") came originally from the Lower Rhine region. In 1400 the family moved to Danzig, where they became quite influential; some members of the family became city councilors and mayors. Christoph Suchten, a paternal uncle, was secretary to the Polish king Sigismund I the Old; a maternal uncle, Alexander Schultze (Scultetus) was a canon in Frombork and one of the few friends of Nicolaus Copernicus.

From 1535 Suchten attended the Gymnasium in Elbląg. In December 1538 he received a position as a canon in Frombork, through his uncle Alexander Schultze. Not long after, this position was barred to uneducated men, so Suchten matriculated in the University of Leuven on 19 January 1541, where he studied philosophy and medicine. Around 1545 he spent a lot of time at the court of Albert of Prussia in Königsberg, where he published his poem Vandalus (based on a Polish legend about Princess Wanda). Between 1549 and 1552 Suchten was employed as an alchemist by Otto Henry, Elector Palatine. From about 1554 to 1557 he was at the Polish royal court in Kraków. Some time after, he is supposed to have earned a medical doctorate at an Italian university (perhaps the University of Ferrara). In 1563 he attempted unsuccessfully to gain a position as the personal physician in Königsberg. From 1567 he worked with the Strasbourg doctor Michael Toxites in Alsace and in the Upper Rhine. In the fall of 1574 Suchten began to practise as a country doctor in Linz in Upper Austria. He died there on 7 November 1575.

== Works (Auswahl) ==
Alexander von Suchten's works relied heavily on Paracelsus. He spoke out in print against charlatanism, rejecting the possibility of transmuting other metals into gold.

- De Secretis Antimonij liber vnus (Strasbourg, 1570)
- Zween Tractat, Vom Antimonio (Mömpelgard, 1604)
- Antimonii Mysteria Gemina (Leipzig, 1604)
- Chymische Schrifften Alle (Hamburg, 1680; this also contains some texts of disputed authenticity)

== Bibliography ==
- Hubicki, Włodzimierz. "Alexander von Suchten." Sudhoffs Archiv für Geschichte der Medizin und der Naturwissenschaften 44 (1960): 54–63.
- Humberg, Oliver. "Die Verlassenschaft des oberösterreichischen Landschaftsarztes Alexander von Suchten (†1575)." Wolfenbütteler Renaissance-Mitteilungen 31 (2007): 31–51.
- Molitor, Carl. "Alexander von Suchten, ein Arzt und Dichter aus der zeit des Herzogs Albrecht." Altpreußische Monatsschrift 19 (1882): 480–88.
- Strehlau, Helmut. "Die Danziger Patrizierfamilie von Suchten." Ostdeutsche Familienkunde 6 (1971/73): 326–29.
- Carlos Gilly (1977), "Zwischen Erfahrung und Spekulation: Theodor Zwinger und die religiöse und kulturelle Krise seiner Zeit", Basler Zeitschrift für Geschichte und Altertumskunde (in German), no. 77, pp. 74-88 https://www.academia.edu/34359110/
- Carlos Gilly (2002), "Un bel trattato ermetico del paracelsismo: il De tribus facultatibus di Alexander von Suchten - Paracelsianism brings forth a fine Hermetical treatise: Suchten's De tribus facultatibus", [[Magia, alchimia, scienza dal '400 al '700: l'influsso di Ermete Trismegisto / Magic, alchemy and science 15th-18th centuries : the influence of Hermes Trismegistus (Biblioteca Nazionale Marciana - Bibliotheca Philosophica Hermetic¤a), edited by Carlos Gilly & Cis van Heertum, 2 Vol.https://www.academia.edu/34673629/]] (in German), no. II, pp. 185-198
