= To Save the City =

1976 Polish film

- Directed by: Jan Łomnicki
- Written by: Andrzej Szczypiorski; Jan Łomnicki
- Starring: Teresa Budzisz-Krzyżanowska
- Cinematography: Jerzy Gościk
- Release date: 11 October 1976
- Running time: 110 minutes
- Countries: Soviet Union, Poland
- Languages: Russian, Polish, German

To Save the City (Polish: Ocalić miasto) is a 1976 Soviet and Polish World War II film directed by Jan Łomnicki. It was entered into the 10th Moscow International Film Festival.

== Cast ==
- Teresa Budzisz-Krzyżanowska as Jadwiga Nowacka
- Jan Krzyżanowski as Marian Nowacki
- Jacek Miśkiewicz as Janek Nowacki
- Alexander Borisovich Belyavsky as Cpt. Syemyonov (as Aleksander Bielawski)
- Nina Maslova as Masha
- Kirill Arbuzov as Seryozha
- Sergei Polezhayev as Gen. Ivan Konev
- Oleg Mokshantsev as Gen. Ivan Korovnikov
- Jerzy Bączek
- Henryk Bista as Capt. AK 'Sztych'
- Barbara Bosak
- Andrzej Buszewicz as AK soldier
- Marian Cebulski as 'Kania'
- Stanisław Chmieloch as AK soldier 'Malarz'
