= Janusz Akermann =

Polish painter (born 1957)

- Born: 1957 (age 68–69); Tczew
- Education: Academy of Fine Arts in Gdańsk
- Known for: Painting, teaching

Janusz Akermann (born 1957) is a Polish painter from Tczew and Professor of Fine Arts in Gdańsk.

Between 1981 and 1985, Akerman studied at the Painting Department at the State Academy of Fine Arts in Gdańsk. He graduated in 1985, taking over from Kazimierz Śramkiewicz. Then between 1999 and 2002, he started teaching painting and drawing at the European Academy of Art in Warsaw. It was not until 2006 that Akerman received the title of Professor.
