= Kornelia Stawicka =

Polish swimmer

Personal information
- Born: 4 April 1973 (age 53) Tczew, Poland

Sport
- Sport: Swimming

Kornelia Stawicka (born 4 April 1973) is a Polish breaststroke swimmer. She competed in two events at the 1988 Summer Olympics.
