= Execution of Tczew hostages =

Public execution of Polish hostages by the German occupiers in Tczew

- Location: Tczew, Second Polish Republic (occupied by the Third Reich – Reichsgau Danzig-West Prussia)
- Date: 24 January 1940
- Attack type: public execution
- Deaths: 13 civilians
- Perpetrators: Schutzstaffel, Volksdeutscher Selbstschutz

On 24 January 1940, a public execution of Polish hostages was carried out by the German occupiers in Tczew. At the so-called pig market, members of the SS and the paramilitary Volksdeutscher Selbstschutz executed 13 Poles – workers of the Polish State Railways, civil servants, merchants, and craftsmen. The crime was committed in retaliation for the alleged arson of German workshops located in the Tczew factory "Arkona" by the Polish resistance movement.

== Beginning of the German occupation ==
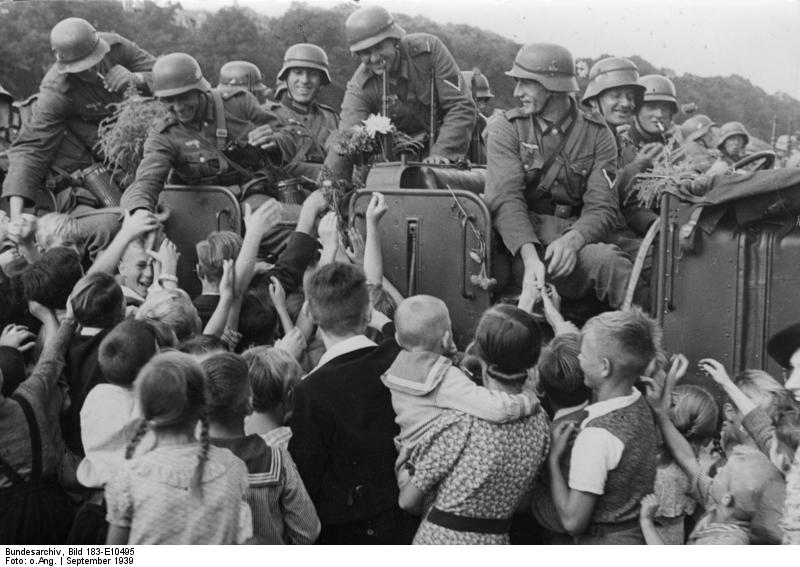
Wehrmacht soldiers welcomed by Tczew's Volksdeutsche

The border city of Tczew was seized by Wehrmacht units as early as 2 September 1939. German authorities, including police, state, and party institutions, quickly established themselves in the occupied city. Otto Andres was appointed Landrat of Tczew County and head of the local Nazi Party organisation (kreisleiter), later replaced by Reinhold Isendick. Dr. Gerhard Regier was installed as the city's mayor. SS-Hauptsturmführer Adolf Leister led the local Gestapo unit. Meanwhile, structures of Selbstschutz – a paramilitary organisation consisting of ethnic Germans residing in pre-war Poland – began forming in Tczew and its surroundings.

Members of Selbstschutz, along with operatives from Einsatzkommando 16 (a Gdańsk-based unit of Sicherheitspolizei) and SS personnel from SS Heimwehr Danzig, initiated mass arrests of Poles. These actions primarily targeted local social and intellectual elites but also included individuals against whom local Germans harboured personal grudges or grievances. Jews were also among the persecuted. These repressive measures formed part of a broader extermination campaign carried out by the German occupiers across Pomerania, known as the Intelligenzaktion. Starting from 10 September 1939, arrested residents of Tczew County were detained in a transit camp located on the premises of former Polish military barracks in Tczew. From late November, detainees were also held in the building of the local vocational school. In the autumn of 1939, between 1,000 and 1,500 people passed through the camp, where they were subjected to exceptionally brutal treatment.

On the grounds of the barracks and in their immediate vicinity, between 120 and 150 prisoners were murdered, of whom the identities of 74 have been established. Among the victims were 16 priests from Pelplin (members of the chapter of the Diocese of Chełmno, professors of the Pelplin seminary, and the renowned Collegium Marianum) as well as several Jews from Gdańsk. Additionally, many prisoners from the Tczew camp were transported to be executed in the Szpęgawsk Forest or sent to the Stutthof concentration camp.

At the same time, the German authorities made efforts to fully Germanize the city, which by the end of October 1939, along with the rest of Pomerania, was incorporated into the Reich as part of the so-called Reichsgau Danzig-West Prussia. At the turn of 1939 and 1940, nearly 1,800 Polish families were expelled from the city (altogether, about 4,000 Poles were deported from Tczew during World War II).

== Fire in the "Arkona" factory ==
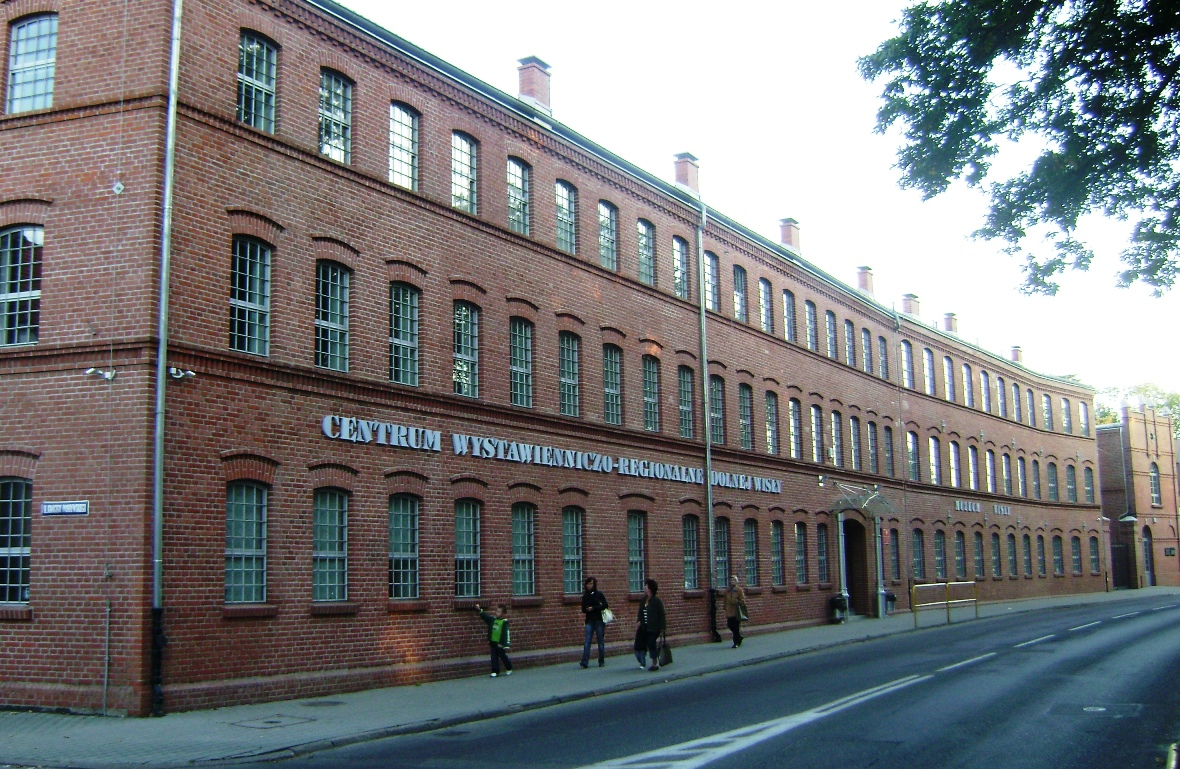
"Arkona" factory – current view

On the night of 23 to 24 January 1940, a fire broke out under unexplained circumstances at the Tczew Metal Products Factory "Arkona" (now the Lower Vistula Exhibition and Regional Center). One of the halls, where the German post had set up its garage and automobile workshop, was completely destroyed. Eleven vehicles were damaged.

The cause of the fire was most likely negligence by the German staff, who, in an attempt to protect the vehicles from freezing, placed braziers too close to the cars. However, Landrat Isendick, who arrived at the scene the next morning, concluded that the fire had been deliberately set by Polish saboteurs and ordered the execution of one Polish man for each destroyed vehicle. No investigation was conducted to confirm the theory of the workshop's deliberate arson.

== Execution of hostages ==
On the same morning, Isendick called an extraordinary meeting at the Tczew municipal office, attended by the heads of the local Gestapo and Selbstschutz branches. A list of Poles to be executed in retaliation for the alleged arson of the workshop was drawn up. Among those on the list were railway workers, local officials, merchants, and craftsmen. 13 people were quickly arrested and brought to the Gestapo headquarters on Bałdowska Street. Their families were assured that their loved ones would be released after questioning.

Around 1 p.m., the arrested individuals were transported by truck to the so-called "pig market" (near Lech Street, now the site of the Tczew Fire Department), where a firing squad composed of members of the SS and Selbstschutz was already waiting. The hostages were beaten with rifle butts and kicked, witnessed by around 40 onlookers. The execution itself began at approximately 2 p.m. Groups of four Poles were led to a nearby building wall and shot. Before their deaths, each group had to load the bodies of the previous victims onto a truck. Witness statements suggest that members of the firing squad were drunk, which might explain the poor accuracy of their shots. Isendick and Gestapo leader Leister had to personally finish off the wounded with handguns. After the execution, the bodies of the victims were buried in the Szpęgawsk Forest.

Later the same day, an "Appeal to the population of the Tczew district" was posted around the city. In it, Isendick warned that, despite all warnings, "the number of sabotage acts by Polish elements has been increasing..." and announced that "the Germans will no longer tolerate such destructive forces... In response to the heinous act of arson committed last night, a number of people have been executed today, specifically chosen as deceitful Poles who were in possession of weapons despite explicit orders to the contrary. Any further acts of sabotage will be met with even harsher measures in the future".

== After the war ==
On 7 October 1945, at the initiative of local Milicja Obywatelska and Security Service officers, a commemorative plaque was placed at the execution site, bearing the names of all the murdered individuals and the inscription: "On this site, on 24 January 1940, Poles were murdered by the Hitlerites for their faith in the future of Poland: (...) In free, democratic Poland, the silent heroes are honored for their loyalty to the homeland". In the following years, the location of the plaque was changed three times, and in 1991, the phrase "The citizens of the city of Tczew pay tribute" was added. The plaque is currently located on Lech Street.

In 1961, the German prosecution began an investigation against Walter Becker, one of the commanders of the Tczew SS (rank SS-Untersturmführer), who participated in the hostage execution on 24 January 1940. After three years, the case was dismissed. The German prosecutors concluded that Becker was not directly responsible for the deaths of the hostages, as he did not give the command to fire, and prosecuting him for complicity in the crime was not possible due to the statute of limitations. In 1970, the Polish Ministry of Justice sent the German prosecutors documentation regarding the Tczew hostage execution case, including 32 witness testimonies. However, the German prosecutors determined that "they bring nothing new to the case".

== Bibliography ==
- Długokęcki, Wiesław, ed. (1998). Historia Tczewa [History of Tczew] (in Polish). Tczew: Kociewski Kantor Edytorski. ISBN 83-85026-53-3.
- Wardzyńska, Maria (2009). Był rok 1939. Operacja niemieckiej policji bezpieczeństwa w Polsce. Intelligenzaktion [It Was the Year 1939. The German Security Police Operation in Poland. Intelligenzaktion] (in Polish). Warsaw: Instytut Pamięci Narodowej. ISBN 978-83-7629-063-8.
