= Just Beyond This Forest =

1992 film by Jan Łomnicki

- Directed by: Jan Łomnicki
- Written by: Anna Stronska
- Cinematography: Artur Radzko
- Music by: Piotr Hertel
- Release date: 1991
- Language: Polish

Just Beyond This Forest (Polish: Jeszcze tylko ten las, also known as Still Only This Forest) is a 1991 Polish war-drama film written and directed by Jan Łomnicki. It was screened in competition at the 48th Venice International Film Festival.

== Cast ==
- Ryszarda Hanin – Kulgawcowa
- Joanna Friedman – Rutka
- Marta Klubowicz-Różycka – Jaśka
- Marzena Trybała – Rutka's Mother
- Jerzy Moes – The Policeman
