= Wojciech Wentura =

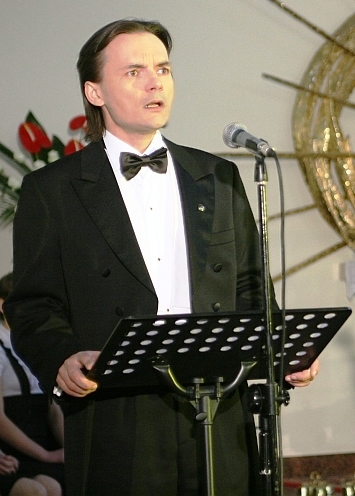

Background information
- Born: Wojciech Wentura; July 17, 1972 (age 53)
- Origin: Tczew, Poland
- Genres: Opera
- Occupation: singer
- Instrument: Voice
- Years active: 2006 - Present
- Labels: OperaWentura.eu
- Website: http://www.wentura.pl/

Wojciech Wentura (born Wojciech Lewandowski) was born in Tczew, he is a musician, actor, composer, pianist, and Polish Operatic tenor.

== Early life and education ==
Wentura began playing the piano as a five-year-old boy. He attended the School of Music in Tczew, where he was taught by the pianist Aurel Kędziorski. At the age of fifteen, he became the first prize winner of the National Sacred Music Festival in Tczew. For over five years, he was a percussionist of the Polish Representative Scout Brass Band, named after Stanisław Moniuszko. He also acted in a theatre run by Michał Spankowski in a pantomime, which served as an inspiration to stage "The Exodus" pantomime for which the music was composed by Wojciech Kilar. It was presented in Witten, Germany, in 1991.

== Career ==
=== Music ===
Wentura was a creator of "The Chandelier" cabaret, in which he staged cabaret performances similar to those presented by "Piwnica pod Baranami" in Cracow. For many years, he was a leader of Tczew's rock band "Mocna Grupa", and toured all over Poland. He composed over twenty songs and lyrics, which were included in the band's repertoire. He left his home town in 1996 and moved to Cracow. He began to collaborate with the artists from "Piwnica pod Baranami".

In Cracow he also participated in televised cabaret productions as an accompanist. He also occasionally appeared in a cabaret called “Loch Camelot”. However, he suspended his artistic activity for almost ten years in order to set up his own computer science business.

After many trips in Europe (France, Germany, Spain and Italy), fascinated by Italian culture, particularly with operatic music, he decided, at the instigation of newly acquainted opera singers, to take up singing solo. Then took the stage name Wojciech Wentura.

He helped initiate the "Italian Bel Canto Show" project, which presents an operatic gala of the most popular Italian operatic arias and Neapolitan songs.

In September, 2011, Wentura was invited to London, to Nigel Wolf-Hoyle's recording studio, and recorded three songs with British singer and performer Katy Carr for her solo album. He also coached the native British singer in the Polish way of singing, accentuation, and pronunciation, in those songs which were recorded with Polish lyrics. Katy Carr's new album has been released in Sept. 17 2012.

Since 2013, Wentura works on his classical opera composition that will have polish libretto. This fact causes the future masterpiece as a 30th polish opera composed in polish opera history. The full title "Opera Avventura - Libertarian Human Adventure in Three Acts" will have short version "Opera Avventura"

=== Film ===
Wojciech Wentura played the main title role in a film production directed by Artur Tomczak and entitled "The Revenge of Dr La Morte" (pol. "Zemsta dr. La Morte"). The film has been shown in cinemas in 2011 during 36th Polish Film Festival in Gdynia.

=== Autobiography ===
Wentura has also finished his own biography book titled "Histrionic Individual's Confession", the story of his own therapy after depression and about his life from the remembered early moments of life to the times of his maturity. An official release date has not been announced, but Wentura has stated, "It is very a personal and intimate confession, but also an entry for philosophical discussion. I don't think my family and friends are ready for this drama, which fortunately is no longer lasting, but just a place in the book. Certainly "Histrionic Individual's Confession" I will release in the second half of my life..."
