= Marzena Trybała =

Polish actress

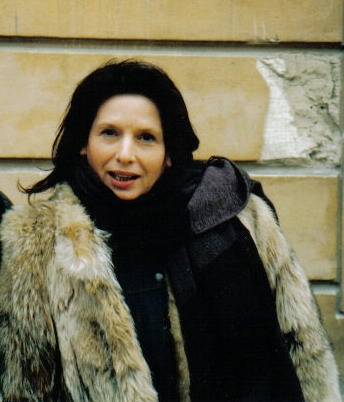
- Marzena Trybała in 2007
- Born: 16 November 1950 (age 75); Kraków, Poland
- Occupation: Actress
- Years active: 1971–present

Marzena Trybała (born 16 November 1950) is a Polish actress. She has appeared in more than 50 films and television shows since 1971.

== Selected filmography ==
- No End (1985)
- Sachsens Glanz und Preußens Gloria (1985)
- Blind Chance (1987)
- Korczak (1990)
- Just Beyond This Forest (1991)
- Our Love (2000)
