= Our Love (film) =

2000 film

- Directed by: József Pacskovszky
- Written by: Jacek Kondracki; József Pacskovszky
- Starring: Melinda Major
- Cinematography: Francisco Gózon
- Release date: 2 March 2000
- Running time: 100 minutes
- Country: Hungary
- Language: Hungarian

Our Love (Hungarian: A Mi szerelmünk) is a 2000 Hungarian drama film directed by József Pacskovszky. It was entered into the 22nd Moscow International Film Festival.

== Cast ==
- Melinda Major as Emmi
- Lajos Bertók as Légoza László
- Erik Desfosses as Alex
- Jan Kidawa-Blonski as Grund
- Teréz Rudolf as Éva
- Marzena Trybala as Madeleina
- Margit Földessy as Dusi
- Eszter Balla as Sabine
- Emese Vasvári as Marie
- István Göz as Pap
- Fidel Atya as Atya
