= Maria Rogowska-Falska =

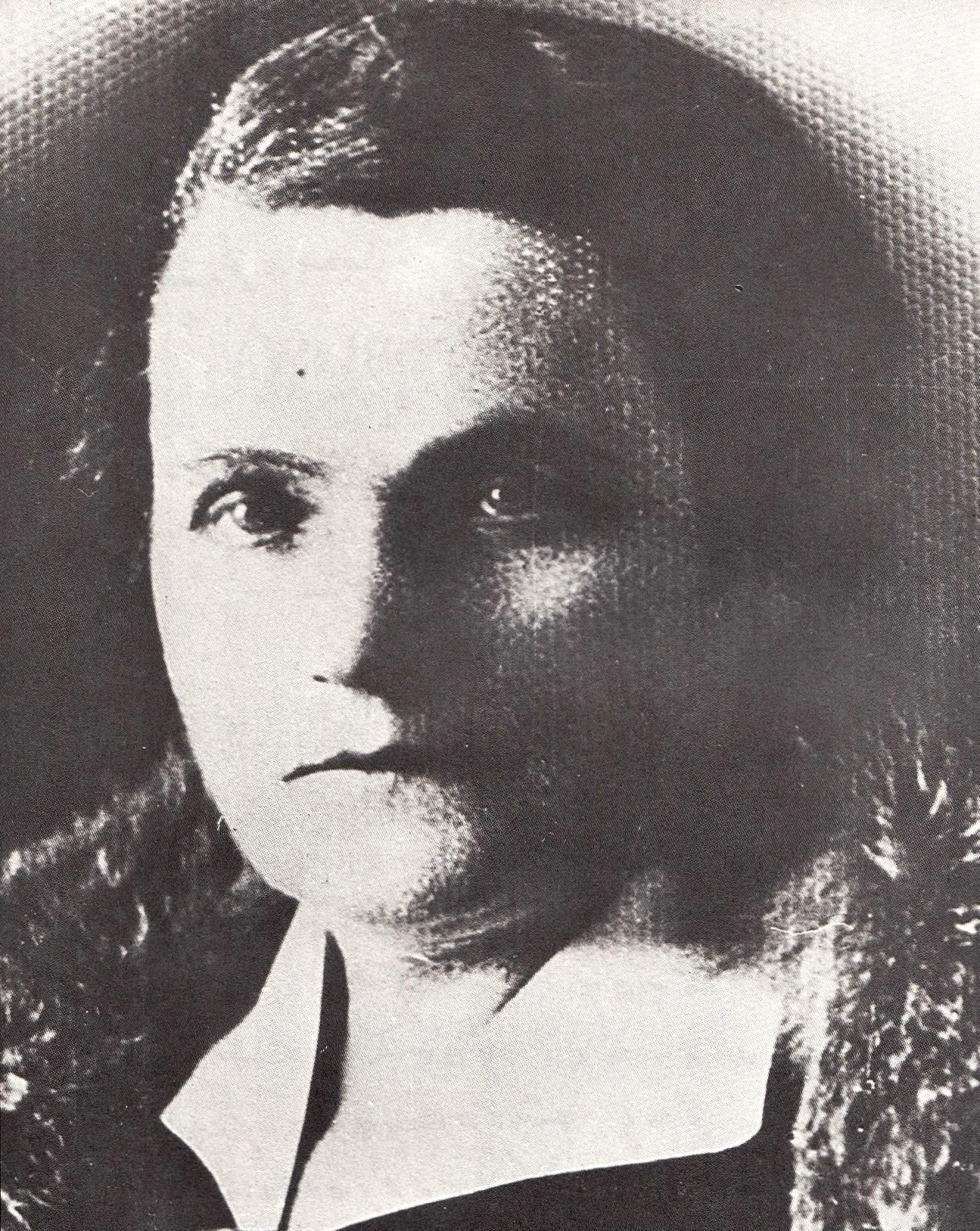
- Maria Rogowska-Falska, 1926
- Born: Maryna Falska; 2 February 1877; Dubno
- Died: 7 September 1944 (aged 67); Warsaw
- Resting place: Powązki Cemetery
- Occupations: teacher, pedagogue, activist
- Political party: Polish Socialist Party
- Spouse: Leon Falski
- Honours: Righteous Among the Nations, Gold Cross of Merit, Officer's Cross of the Order of Polonia Restituta

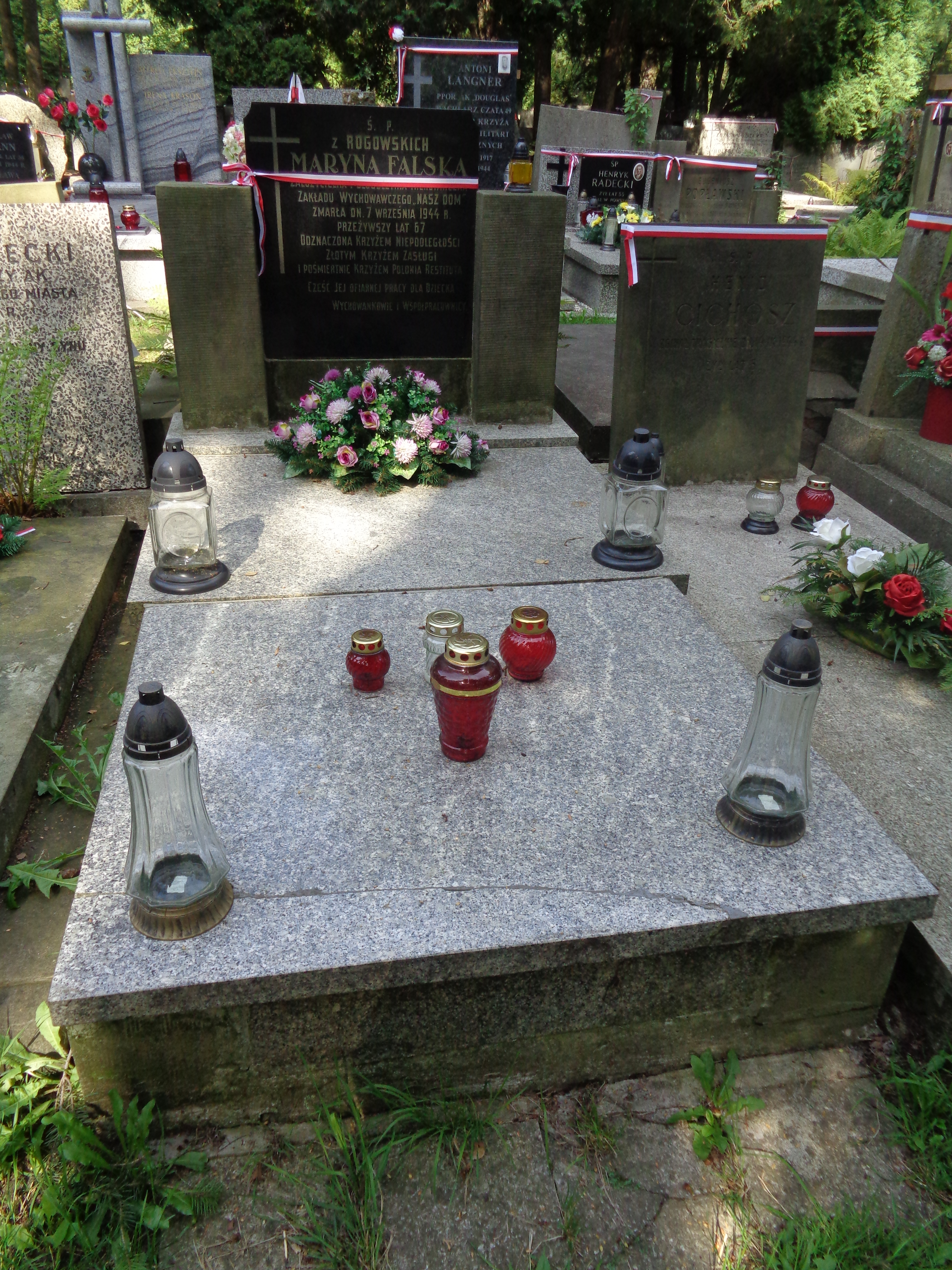
Tomb of Maria Falska-Rogowska at the historical Powązki Cemetery, Warsaw

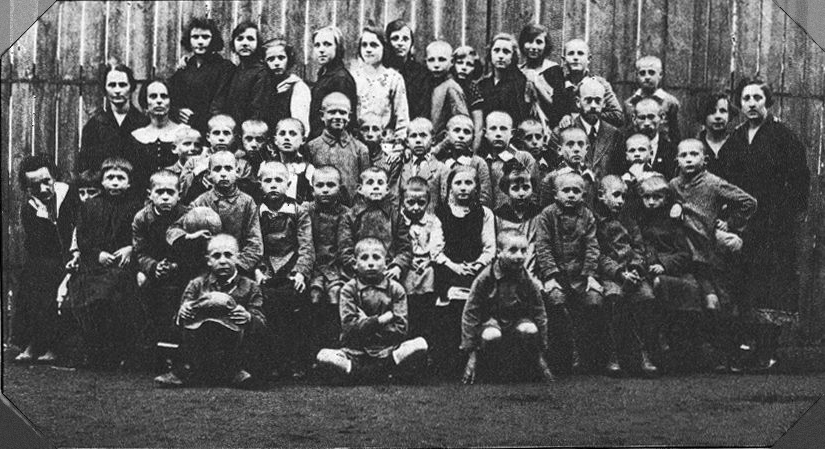
Maryna Falska, Janusz Korczak, Maria Powysocka and other teachers along with pupils of Our Home, the 1920s

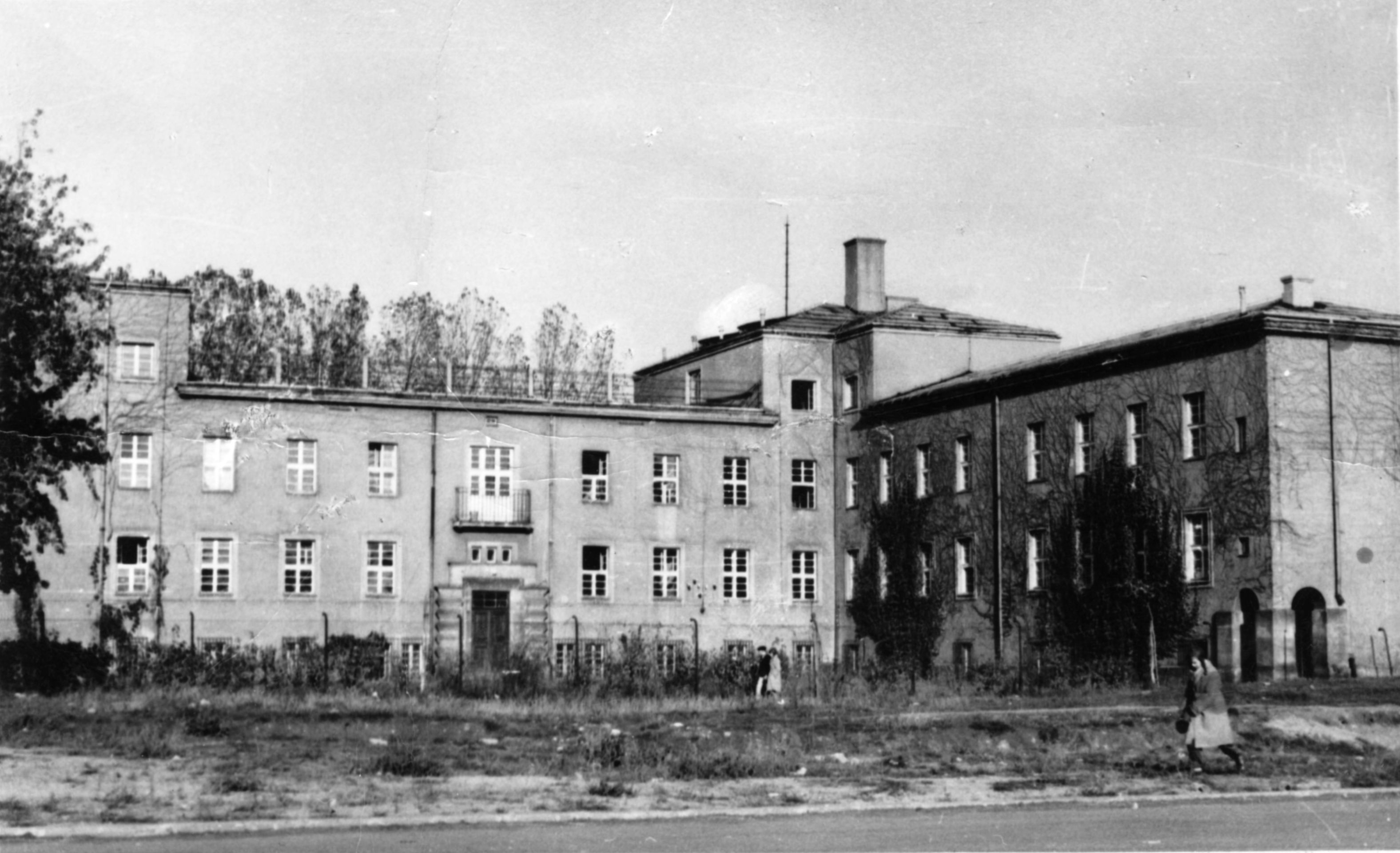
ur Home orphanage in Bielany

Maria Rogowska-Falska, also known as Maryna Falska (2 February 1877, Dubno – 7 September 1944, Warsaw) – was a Polish teacher, pedagogue, activist.

== Biography ==
She was born Maria Rogowska into a noble family in Dubno on 2 February 1877. She spend her early years in Warsaw and Łódź, where she was studying pedagogy and achieved a teaching diploma. After studies she was involved in independence activities of PPS along with her brothers, she was spreading culture and social knowledge among laborers. She was using her alias ‘Hilda’ and was arrested on several occasions for illegal PPS’ printing works at the time. She was imprisoned with Józef Piłsudski. In 1905 she was arrested, incarcerated and exiled in Deep Russia.

She married well-known doctor and social activist Leon Falski, whom she possibly had met in London, where both of them had been hiding from Okhrana. Back in Poland they had a baby-girl and moved to Volozhyn, Lithuania, where Leon started to work as a country doctor, treating Poles, Jews and Lithuanians. In 1912 he died in Volozhyn curing typhoid fever during its outbreak. Maria left for her friends in Moscow, where her daughter died at the age of 2.

From 1917 to 1918, when she was running boarding house for Polish teenagers and children in Kiev, she met Janusz Korczak and implemented his methodology of educational community, based on creation of an emotional bond and a sense of belonging together. In 1918 she came back to Poland and started work on behalf of Ministry of Health as an inspector of children's homes.

In 1919 Maryna Falska along with Janusz Korczak and Maria Powysocka created exemplary orphanage and boarding school Our Home ("Nasz Dom") in Pruszków. Mostly children of laborers who had died during the war were placed in the orphanage. But in time, also social orphans found their home there, because Falska helped all the children in need. Since 1921 the orphanage was under the care of "Our Home" Association; from 1927 to 1929 a plot was bought by its contributions and a new facility was built in Bielany District, Warsaw. The Association was under Aleksandra Piłsudska’s patronage.

Maryna Falska described institutional forms of work carried out by her institution in "Szkic informacyjny o "Naszym Domu"”.

She managed to hide several Jewish children after the outbreak of World War II, including a daughter of Salo Fiszgrund, a Polish-Jewish Bund leader. She also reconnected with Janusz Korczak and offered him help to escape the ghetto (however Korczak rejected her proposition). In January 1943, she hide a manuscript of Korczak's diary- passed on by Igor Newerly's wife after arresting the writer by Germans- in special secret compartment in Our House’ building in Bielany.

She died of a sudden heart attack on 7 September 1944, when Germans forced the evacuation of the orphanage to a transit camp in Pruszków. According to an alternative version given by Antoni Chojdyński - pupil of Our Home and Warsaw Uprising insurgent - she committed suicide by cyanide poisoning.

== Decorations and awards ==
In recognition of all her work she was decorated with the Gold Cross of Merit, she was also posthumously honored with the Officer's Cross of Polonia Restitutia by the Polish Council of State in 1947.

On 14 April 1985 Maria Rogowska-Falska was honored with the title Righteous Among the Nations by Yad Vashem.
