= 2000 UEFA Intertoto Cup =

Tournament details
- Dates: 18 June 2000 – 22 August 2000
- Teams: 60

Final positions
- Champions: (Spain) Celta Vigo (Italy) Udinese (Germany) Stuttgart

Tournament statistics
- Matches played: 114
- Goals scored: 339 (2.97 per match)

The 2000 UEFA Intertoto Cup finals were won by Udinese, Celta Vigo, and Stuttgart. All three teams advanced to the UEFA Cup.

== First round ==
- Matches played on 18–19 June and 25–26 June

Team 1	Agg.	Team 2	1st leg	2nd leg
Pelister (North Macedonia)	4–1	(Luxembourg) Hobscheid	3–1	1–0
OD Trenčín (Slovakia)	0–4	(Latvia) Dinaburg	0–3	0–1
Zagłębie Lubin (Poland)	7–1	(Azerbaijan) Vilash Masallı	4–0	3–1
Cibalia (Croatia)	4–2	(Federal Republic of Yugoslavia) Obilić	3–1	1–1
LASK Linz (Austria)	4–1	(Israel) Hapoel Petah Tikva	3–0	1–1
Nea Salamis Famagusta (Cyprus)	6–2	(Albania) Vllaznia	4–1	2–1
HB Tórshavn (Faroe Islands)	0–7	(Hungary) Tatabánya	0–4	0–3
Leiftur (Iceland)	6–6 (a)	(Switzerland) Luzern	2–2	4–4
Glenavon (Northern Ireland)	1–4	(Croatia) Slaven Belupo	1–1	0–3
Dnepr-Transmash Mogilev (Belarus)	4–2	(Denmark) Silkeborg	2–1	2–1
Floriana (Malta)	1–3	(Norway) Stabæk	1–1	0–2
Dinamo Tbilisi (Georgia (country))	3–3 (a)	(Belgium) Standard Liège	2–2	1–1
Primorje (Slovenia)	11–0	(Belgium) Westerlo	5–0	6–0
Narva Trans (Estonia)	4–9	(Romania) Ceahlăul Piatra Neamţ	2–5	2–4
Cwmbrân Town (Wales)	0–2	(Moldova) Nistru Otaci	0–1	0–1
Kocaelispor (Turkey)	1–1 (3–5 p)	(Lithuania) Atlantas	0–1	1–0
Västra Frölunda (Sweden)	2–2 (a)	(Bosnia and Herzegovina) Zrinjski Mostar	1–0	1–2
MyPa (Finland)	4–5	(Switzerland) Neuchâtel Xamax	1–2	3–3
Araks Ararat (Armenia)	1–3	(Czech Republic) Sigma Olomouc	1–2	0–1
UCD (Republic of Ireland)	3–3 (a)	(Bulgaria) Velbazhd Kyustendil	3–3	0–0

=== First leg ===
17 June 2000

Pelister (North Macedonia)	3–1	(Luxembourg) Hobscheid
Trenevski 47'; Grozdanov 81'; Elmazovski 85'		El Aouad 4'

Stadion Tumbe Kafe, Bitola
Attendance: 5,000
Referee: Milan Mitrovič (Slovenia)

17 June 2000

OD Trenčín (Slovakia)	0–0	(Latvia) Dinaburg

Štadión na Sihoti, Trenčín
Attendance: 825
Referee: Džemal Čalija (Bosnia and Herzegovina)

The game was awarded to Dinaburg with a score of 3–0 due to OD Trenčín fielding an ineligible player.

17 June 2000

Zagłębie Lubin (Poland)	4–0	(Azerbaijan) Vilash Masallı
Lewandowski 15'; Manuszewski 36'; Grzybowski 49', 64'

Stadion Miejski, Kraków
Attendance: 450
Referee: Vladimir Antonov (Moldova)

17 June 2000

Cibalia (Croatia)	3–1	(Federal Republic of Yugoslavia) Obilić
Bošnjak 10'; Maroslavac 13'; Bartolović 61'		Jurić 33' (o.g.)

Stadion HNK Cibalia, Vinkovci
Attendance: 9,000
Referee: Bruno Coué (France)

18 June 2000

LASK Linz (Austria)	2–1	(Israel) Hapoel Petah Tikva
Ortner 40'; Memić 85'		Hilel 45'

Trattnachtalstadion, Grieskirchen
Attendance: 800
Referee: Adrian Stoica (Romania)

The game was awarded to LASK Linz with a score of 3–0 due to Hapoel Petah Tikva fielding an ineligible player.

17 June 2000

Nea Salamis Famagusta (Cyprus)	4–1	(Albania) Vllaznia
Elia 4'; Nicolaou 26'; Angelis 47', 61'		Bylykbashi 87'

Makario Stadium, Nicosia
Attendance: 607
Referee: Haim Yaakov (Israel)

18 June 2000

HB Tórshavn (Faroe Islands)	0–4	(Hungary) Tatabánya
		Zsivóczky 13'; Nagy 20', 42'; Hornyák 55'

Gundadalur, Tórshavn
Attendance: 1,000
Referee: John Ferry (Northern Ireland)

18 June 2000

Leiftur (Iceland)	2–2	(Switzerland) Luzern
Rasmussen 32'; Barreto 55'		Gian 72'; Frei 79'

Ólafsfjarðarvöllur, Ólafsfjörður
Attendance: 300
Referee: Oleg Timofeev (Estonia)

17 June 2000

Glenavon (Northern Ireland)	1–1	(Croatia) Slaven Belupo
O'Connor 47'		Jurčec 76'

Mourneview Park, Lurgan
Attendance: 1,000
Referee: Lassin Isaksen (Faroe Islands)

17 June 2000
18:00 UTC+3

Dnepr-Transmash Mogilev (Belarus)	2–1	(Denmark) Silkeborg
D. Kalachow 28'; Aharodnik 87'		Nørholt 31'

City Stadium, Barysaw
Attendance: 2,000
Referee: Hubert Byrne (Republic of Ireland)

17 June 2000

Floriana (Malta)	1–1	(Norway) Stabæk
Galea 42'		Michelsen 88'

Hibernians Stadium, Paola
Attendance: 187
Referee: Zdravko Savić (FR Yugoslavia)

17 June 2000

Dinamo Tbilisi (Georgia (country))	2–2	(Belgium) Standard Liège
Gogoladze 8'; Zirakishvili 40'		Woos 77'; Florkin 87'

Boris Paichadze National Stadium, Tbilisi
Attendance: 1,500
Referee: Eyal Zur (Israel)

17 June 2000

Primorje (Slovenia)	5–0	(Belgium) Westerlo
Starčevič 24', 52'; Barut 36'; Reljić 53'; Vogrič 88'

Ajdovščina Stadium, Ajdovščina
Attendance: 700
Referee: Ferenc Bede (Hungary)

18 June 2000

Narva Trans (Estonia)	2–5	(Romania) Ceahlăul Piatra Neamţ
Gruznov 13', 86'		Scânteie 14', 36'; Grozavu 72', 83'; Botez 75'

Kadriorg Stadium, Tallinn
Attendance: 245
Referee: Jørn Larsen (Denmark)

18 June 2000

Cwmbrân Town (Wales)	0–1	(Moldova) Nistru Otaci
		Popescu 74'

Newport Stadium, Newport
Attendance: 250
Referee: Genadz Yakubovskiy (Belarus)

18 June 2000

Kocaelispor (Turkey)	0–1	(Lithuania) Atlantas
		Karalius 10'

İzmit İsmetpaşa Stadium, İzmit
Attendance: 1,645
Referee: Sergo Kvaratskhelia (Georgia)

18 June 2000

Västra Frölunda (Sweden)	1–0	(Bosnia and Herzegovina) Zrinjski Mostar
Uzelac 85'

Ruddalens IP, Gothenburg
Attendance: 247
Referee: Zbigniew Marczyk (Poland)

18 June 2000

MyPa (Finland)	1–2	(Switzerland) Neuchâtel Xamax
Väisänen 30'		Perret 60'; Bilibani 84'

Anjalankosken Jalkapallostadion, Anjalankoski
Attendance: 1,203
Referee: Karel Vidlák (Czech Republic)

18 June 2000

Araks Ararat (Armenia)	1–2	(Czech Republic) Sigma Olomouc
Sarikian 73'		Vlček 1', 39'

Ayg Stadium, Ararat
Attendance: 150
Referee: Brian Lawlor (Wales)

18 June 2000

UCD (Republic of Ireland)	3–3	(Bulgaria) Velbazhd Kyustendil
McAuley 13', 61'; Martyn 76'		Stoychev 17'; Mikhailov 41'; Velichkov 63' (pen.)

Belfield Park, Dublin
Attendance: 1,100
Referee: Dejan Delević (FR Yugoslavia)

=== Second leg ===
24 June 2000

Hobscheid (Luxembourg)	0–1	(North Macedonia) Pelister
		Momirovski 85'

Stade Koericherberg, Hobscheid
Attendance: 218
Referee: Imankhan Sultani (Azerbaijan)

Pelister won 4–1 on aggregate.

24 June 2000

Dinaburg (Latvia)	1–0	(Slovakia) OD Trenčín
Dubrovin 20'

Celtnieks Stadium, Daugavpils
Attendance: 1,000
Referee: John McDermott (Republic of Ireland)

Dinaburg won 4–0 on aggregate.

24 June 2000

Vilash Masallı (Azerbaijan)	1–3	(Poland) Zagłębie Lubin
Khursevich 75'		Grzybowski 28'; Żuraw 89'; Olszowiak 90'

Tofiq Bahramov Republican Stadium, Baku
Attendance: 1,800
Referee: Charles Schaack (Luxembourg)

Zagłębie Lubin won 7–1 on aggregate.

24 June 2000

Obilić (Federal Republic of Yugoslavia)	1–1	(Croatia) Cibalia
Obradović 16'		Pavličić 62'

Obilić Stadium, Belgrade
Attendance: 5,000
Referee: Svetozar Marinov (Bulgaria)

Cibalia won 4–2 on aggregate.

24 June 2000

Hapoel Petah Tikva (Israel)	1–1	(Austria) LASK Linz
Abarbanel 78'		Ortner 7'

HaMoshava Stadium, Petah Tikva
Attendance: 500
Referee: Dominique Tavel (Switzerland)

LASK Linz won 4–1 on aggregate.

24 June 2000

Vllaznia (Albania)	1–2	(Cyprus) Nea Salamis Famagusta
Bylykbashi 77'		Andreou 64'; Ioannides 71'

Qemal Stafa Stadium, Tirana
Attendance: 1,000
Referee: Srečko Kandare (Slovenia)

Nea Salamis Famagusta won 6–2 on aggregate.

24 June 2000

Tatabánya (Hungary)	3–0	(Faroe Islands) HB Tórshavn
Tüske 29'; Nagy 62'; Mészöly 83'

Grosics Gyula Stadion, Tatabánya
Attendance: 500
Referee: Merab Malagurazde (Georgia)

Tatabánya won 7–0 on aggregate.

24 June 2000

Luzern (Switzerland)	4–4	(Iceland) Leiftur
Frei 52'; Lipawsky 56'; Ohrel 57', 88'		Gíslason 39'; Petersen 64'; Magnússon 85'; Helgason 90'

Stadion Allmend, Lucerne
Attendance: 1,327
Referee: Karen Nalbandyan (Armenia)

6–6 on aggregate, Leiftur won on away goals rule.

24 June 2000

Slaven Belupo (Croatia)	3–0	(Northern Ireland) Glenavon
Amižić 6'; Jurčec 19', 63'

Gradski stadion, Koprivnica
Attendance: 3,500
Referee: Serhiy Shebek (Ukraine)

Slaven Belupo won 4–1 on aggregate.

24 June 2000
15:00 UTC+2

Silkeborg (Denmark)	1–2	(Belarus) Dnepr-Transmash Mogilev
Røll 42'		T. Kalachow 78'; Aharodnik 90'

Silkeborg Stadium, Silkeborg
Attendance: 1,200
Referee: Kostadin Kostadinov (Bulgaria)

Dnepr-Transmash Mogilev won 4–2 on aggregate.

24 June 2000

Stabæk (Norway)	2–0	(Malta) Floriana
Wilhelmsson 55'; Belsvik 90'

Nadderud Stadion, Bærum
Attendance: 268
Referee: Kazimir Znaydinski (Belarus)

Stabæk won 3–1 on aggregate.

24 June 2000

Standard Liège (Belgium)	1–1	(Georgia (country)) Dinamo Tbilisi
Van Buyten 75'		Zirakishvili 28'

Stade Maurice Dufrasne, Liège
Attendance: 262
Referee: Sazan Velcani (Albania)

3–3 on aggregate, Standard Liège won on away goals rule.

24 June 2000

Westerlo (Belgium)	0–6	(Slovenia) Primorje
		Starčevič 10', 12', 88'; Pate 31', 39'; Barut 46'

Het Kuipje, Westerlo
Attendance: 326
Referee: Gevorg Hovhannisyan (Armenia)

Primorje won 11–0 on aggregate.

25 June 2000

Ceahlăul Piatra Neamţ (Romania)	4–2	(Estonia) Narva Trans
Scânteie 23'; Ilie 37', 66'; Botez 44'		Lipartov 7'; Nejolov 90'

Stadionul Ceahlăul, Piatra Neamț
Attendance: 307
Referee: Sašo Lazarevski (Macedonia)

Ceahlăul Piatra Neamţ won 9–4 on aggregate.

25 June 2000

Nistru Otaci (Moldova)	1–0	(Wales) Cwmbrân Town
Kopystyanskyy 89'

Stadionul Republican, Chișinău
Attendance: 1,000
Referee: Attila Juhos (Hungary)

Nistru Otaci won 2–0 on aggregate.

25 June 2000

Atlantas (Lithuania)	0–1 (a.e.t.)	(Turkey) Kocaelispor
		Özden 41' (pen.)
Penalties
Lukoševičius (penalty scored); Karalius (penalty scored); Jermakovas (penalty scored); Maciulevičius (penalty scored); Šuika (penalty scored)	5–3	(penalty scored) Hassan; (penalty scored) Öztonga; (penalty scored) Erkan; (penalty missed) Mumcu

Zalgirio Stadionas, Klaipėda
Attendance: 2,500
Referee: Juha Hirviniemi (Finland)

1–1 on aggregate, Atlantas won on penalties.

25 June 2000

Zrinjski Mostar (Bosnia and Herzegovina)	2–1 (a.e.t.)	(Sweden) Västra Frölunda
B. Miloš 44'; Buhić 96'		Uzelac 105'

Stadion pod Bijelim Brijegom, Mostar
Attendance: 5,000
Referee: Richard O'Hanlon (Republic of Ireland)

2–2 on aggregate, Västra Frölunda on away goals rule.

25 June 2000

Neuchâtel Xamax (Switzerland)	3–3	(Finland) MyPa
Koch 2', 4'; Bilibani 81'		Lindberg 48', 70'; Puhakainen 83'

Stade de la Maladière, Neuchâtel
Attendance: 500
Referee: Uriah Rennie (England)

Neuchâtel Xamax won 5–4 on aggregate.

25 June 2000

Sigma Olomouc (Czech Republic)	1–0	(Armenia) Araks Ararat
Vlček 58'

Andrův stadion, Olomouc
Attendance: 1,052
Referee: Bragi Bergmann (Iceland)

Sigma Olomouc won 3–1 on aggregate.

25 June 2000

Velbazhd Kyustendil (Bulgaria)	0–0	(Republic of Ireland) UCD

Osogovo Stadium, Kyustendil
Attendance: 1,000
Referee: Igor Horozhankin (Ukraine)

3–3 on aggregate, Velbazhd Kyustendil won on away goals rule.

== Second round ==
- Matches played 1–2 July and 8–9 July

Team 1	Agg.	Team 2	1st leg	2nd leg
Nistru Otaci (Moldova)	3–7	Austria Salzburg	2–6	1–1
Zenit Saint Petersburg (Russia)	6–1	(Slovenia) Primorje	3–0	3–1
Perugia (Italy)	2–3	(Belgium) Standard Liège	1–2	1–1
Nea Salamis Famagusta (Cyprus)	1–3	Austria Wien	1–0	0–3
Stabæk (Norway)	0–5	(France) Auxerre	0–2	0–3
Dinaburg (Latvia)	0–1	(Denmark) AaB	0–0	0–1
LASK Linz (Austria)	3–4	(Czech Republic) Marila Příbram	1–1	2–3
Atlantas (Lithuania)	2–7	(England) Bradford City	1–3	1–4
Mallorca (Spain)	3–4	(Romania) Ceahlăul Piatra Neamţ	2–1	1–3
Chmel Blšany (Czech Republic)	8–2	(Belarus) Dnepr-Transmash Mogilev	6–2	2–0
Sedan (France)	6–2	(Iceland) Leiftur	3–0	3–2
Neuchâtel Xamax (Switzerland)	2–10	(Germany) Stuttgart	1–6	1–4
Zagłębie Lubin (Poland)	1–1 (a)	(Croatia) Slaven Belupo	1–1	0–0
Tatabánya (Hungary)	3–2	(Croatia) Cibalia	3–2	0–0
Pelister (North Macedonia)	3–1	(Sweden) Västra Frölunda	3–1	0–0
Velbazhd Kyustendil (Bulgaria)	2–8	(Czech Republic) Sigma Olomouc	2–0	0–8

=== First leg ===
1 July 2000

Nistru Otaci (Moldova)	2–6	Austria Salzburg
Alexandre 17'; Kopystyanskyy 71'		Sabitzer 58'; Kitzbichler 60', 64', 85'; Laeßig 67'; Aufhauser 73'

Stadionul Republican, Chișinău
Attendance: 1,000
Referee: Krzysztof Slupik (Poland)

1 July 2000

Zenit Saint Petersburg (Russia)	3–0	(Slovenia) Primorje
Nagibin 9'; Popovych 45' (pen.); Panov 71'

Petrovsky Stadium, Saint Petersburg
Attendance: 12,000
Referee: Jonny Ditlefsen (Norway)

1 July 2000

Perugia (Italy)	1–2	(Belgium) Standard Liège
Calori 52'		Lukunku 35'; Thijs 55'

Stadio Brianteo, Monza
Attendance: 479
Referee: António Almeida Costa (Portugal)

1 July 2000

Nea Salamis Famagusta (Cyprus)	1–0	Austria Wien
Ilias 24'

Makario Stadium, Nicosia
Attendance: 822
Referee: Michael Ross (Northern Ireland)

1 July 2000

Stabæk (Norway)	0–2	(France) Auxerre
		Comisetti 60'; Guivarc'h 67'

Nadderud Stadion, Bærum
Attendance: 413
Referee: Anton Stredák (Slovakia)

2 July 2000

Dinaburg (Latvia)	0–0	(Denmark) AaB

Celtnieks Stadium, Daugavpils
Attendance: 1,000
Referee: Georgios Kasnaferis (Greece)

1 July 2000

LASK Linz (Austria)	1–1	(Czech Republic) Marila Příbram
Lichtenwagner 59'		Kulič 11'

Linzer Stadion, Linz
Attendance: 1,000
Referee: Alojzije Šupraha (Croatia)

2 July 2000

Atlantas (Lithuania)	1–3	(England) Bradford City
Lukoševičius 27' (pen.)		Rankin 12'; Windass 37'; Blake 74' (pen.)

Klaipėdos centrinis stadionas, Klaipėda
Attendance: 3,174
Referee: Mario van der Ende (Netherlands)

1 July 2000

Mallorca (Spain)	2–1	(Romania) Ceahlăul Piatra Neamţ
Pelegrín 2'; Güiza 37'		Perjă 25'

Son Moix, Palma
Attendance: 3,860
Referee: Franz-Xaver Wack (Germany)

1 July 2000
16:30

Chmel Blšany (Czech Republic)	6–2	(Belarus) Dnepr-Transmash Mogilev
Sýkora 9'; Koubek 45', 67'; Velkoborský 50'; Boček 57'; Devátý 73'		Aharodnik 15', 59' (pen.)

FK Chmel Blšany, Blšany
Attendance: 1,000
Referee: Khagani Mamedov (Azerbaijan)

1 July 2000

Sedan (France)	3–0	(Iceland) Leiftur
Mionnet 15', 45'; Ndiefi 63'

Stade Émile Albeau, Sedan
Attendance: 3,705
Referee: Loizos Loizou (Cyprus)

1 July 2000

Neuchâtel Xamax (Switzerland)	1–6	(Germany) Stuttgart
Simo 69' (pen.)		Hosny 6', 59'; Schneider 15'; Pinto 20'; Soldo 76' (pen.); Amanatidis 90'

Stade de la Maladière, Neuchâtel
Attendance: 1,300
Referee: Serguei Goussev (Russia)

1 July 2000

Zagłębie Lubin (Poland)	1–1	(Croatia) Slaven Belupo
Żuraw 31'		Dodik 89'

Stadion Miejski, Kraków
Attendance: 500
Referee: Paul Allaerts (Belgium)

1 July 2000

Tatabánya (Hungary)	3–2	(Croatia) Cibalia
Zsivóczky 28'; Kovács 71', 90+1'		Meštrović 3'; Maroslavac 80'

Grosics Gyula Stadion, Tatabánya
Attendance: 1,000
Referee: Mirosław Milewski (Poland)

1 July 2000

Pelister (North Macedonia)	3–1	(Sweden) Västra Frölunda
Sterjov 57'; Momirovski 65' (pen.); Elmazovski 71'		Talebinejad 4'

Stadion Tumbe Kafe, Bitola
Attendance: 3,400
Referee: Marco Tura (San Marino)

2 July 2000

Velbazhd Kyustendil (Bulgaria)	2–0	(Czech Republic) Sigma Olomouc
Stoychev 16'; G. Petrov 58'

Osogovo Stadium, Kyustendil
Attendance: 1,100
Referee: Georgios Psychomanis (Greece)

=== Second leg ===
8 July 2000

Austria Salzburg	1–1	(Moldova) Nistru Otaci
Hobel 26'		Blajco 36'

Stadion Lehen, Salzburg
Attendance: 1,164
Referee: Sten Kaldma (Estonia)

Austria Salzburg won 7–2 on aggregate.

9 July 2000

Primorje (Slovenia)	1–3	(Russia) Zenit Saint Petersburg
Mulahmetović 77'		Spivak 26', 42'; Petukhov 63'

Ajdovščina Stadium, Ajdovščina
Attendance: 1,800
Referee: Lawrence Sammut (Malta)

Zenit Saint Petersburg won 6–1 on aggregate.

8 July 2000

Standard Liège (Belgium)	1–1	(Italy) Perugia
Mornar 54'		Alenichev 29' (pen.)

Stade Sclessin, Liège
Attendance: 2,000
Referee: Andreas Schluchter (Switzerland)

Standard Liège won 3–2 on aggregate.

8 July 2000

Austria Wien	3–0	(Cyprus) Nea Salamis Famagusta
Ledwoń 4'; Leitner 48'; Hopfer 90'

Franz Horr Stadium, Vienna
Attendance: 2,497
Referee: Taras Bezubyak (Russia)

Austria Wien won 3–1 on aggregate.

8 July 2000

Auxerre (France)	4–2	(Norway) Stabæk
Deblock 37'; Comisetti 61'; Guivarc'h 65' (pen.), 71'		Linderoth 20'; Ackon 53'

Stade de l'Abbé-Deschamps, Auxerre
Attendance: 1,600
Referee: Darius Miezelis (Lithuania)

The game was awarded to Auxerre with a score of 3–0 due to Stabæk fielding an ineligible player Denis Iliohen. Auxerre won 5–0 on aggregate.

9 July 2000

AaB (Denmark)	1–0	(Latvia) Dinaburg
Gaarde 65'

Aalborg Stadium, Aalborg
Attendance: 2,263
Referee: Anton Genov (Bulgaria)

AaB won 1–0 on aggregate.

9 July 2000

Marila Příbram (Czech Republic)	3–2	(Austria) LASK Linz
Kulič 18'; Šmejkal 89', 90+1'		Memić 4'; Kiesenebner 79'

Na Litavce, Příbram
Attendance: 4,400
Referee: Ceri Richards (Wales)

Marila Příbram won 4–3 on aggregate.

9 July 2000

Bradford City (England)	4–1	(Lithuania) Atlantas
Mills 12', 36'; Blake 70' (pen.); Grant 85'		Karalius 90+'

Valley Parade, Bradford
Attendance: 10,012
Referee: Fernando Carmona Mendez (Spain)

Bradford City won 7–2 on aggregate.

8 July 2000

Ceahlăul Piatra Neamţ (Romania)	3–1	(Spain) Mallorca
Grozavu 23'; Hrib 57'; Axinia 84'		Güiza 12'

Stadionul Ceahlăul, Piatra Neamț
Attendance: 3,500
Referee: Manfred Schüttengruber (Austria)

Ceahlăul Piatra Neamţ won 4–3 on aggregate.

8 July 2000
18:00

Dnepr-Transmash Mogilev (Belarus)	0–2	(Czech Republic) Chmel Blšany
		Gedeon 75'; Drobný 90'

City Stadium, Barysaw
Attendance: 1,500
Referee: Romāns Lajuks (Latvia)

Chmel Blšany won 8–2 on aggregate.

8 July 2000

Leiftur (Iceland)	2–3	(France) Sedan
Petersen 51'; Tryggvason 90'		Ndiefi 20', 45'; Quint 42'

Ólafsfjarðarvöllur, Ólafsfjörður
Attendance: 280
Referee: Nicolai Vollquartz (Denmark)

Sedan won 6–2 on aggregate.

9 July 2000

Stuttgart (Germany)	4–1	(Switzerland) Neuchâtel Xamax
Seitz 36', 51', 52'; Amanatidis 90'		Caracciolo 87'

Wildparkstadion, Karlsruhe
Attendance: 2,000
Referee: Domenico Messina (Italy)

Stuttgart won 10–2 on aggregate.

8 July 2000

Slaven Belupo (Croatia)	0–0	(Poland) Zagłębie Lubin

Gradski stadion, Koprivnica
Attendance: 3,500
Referee: Mustafa Çulcu (Turkey)

1–1 on aggregate, Slaven Belupo won on away goals rule.

8 July 2000

Cibalia (Croatia)	0–0	(Hungary) Tatabánya

Stadion HNK Cibalia, Vinkovci
Attendance: 2,000
Referee: Sten Johansson (Sweden)

Tatabánya won 3–2 on aggregate.

8 July 2000

Västra Frölunda (Sweden)	0–0	(North Macedonia) Pelister

Ruddalens IP, Gothenburg
Attendance: 564
Referee: Ihor Yarmenchuk (Ukraine)

Pelister won 3–1 on aggregate.

8 July 2000

Sigma Olomouc (Czech Republic)	8–0	(Bulgaria) Velbazhd Kyustendil
Vlček 3', 50', 64', 90'; Kovář 11' (pen.), 53' (pen.), 77' (pen.), 84' (pen.)

Andrův stadion, Olomouc
Attendance: 870
Referee: Florin Chivulete (Romania)

Sigma Olomouc won 8–2 on aggregate.

== Third round ==
- Matches played 15–16 July and 22 July

Team 1	Agg.	Team 2	1st leg	2nd leg
Celta Vigo (Spain)	5–1	(North Macedonia) Pelister	3–0	2–1
AaB (Denmark)	2–3	(Italy) Udinese	0–2	2–1
Sedan (France)	1–2	(Germany) Wolfsburg	0–0	1–2
Marila Příbram (Czech Republic)	1–3	(England) Aston Villa	0–0	1–3
Chmel Blšany (Czech Republic)	8–0	(Greece) Kalamata	5–0	3–0
Lens (France)	2–2 (a)	(Germany) Stuttgart	2–1	0–1
Bradford City (England)	3–0	(Netherlands) RKC Waalwijk	2–0	1–0
Rostselmash (Russia)	1–5	(France) Auxerre	0–2	1–3
Slaven Belupo (Croatia)	1–2	(Czech Republic) Sigma Olomouc	1–1	0–1
Standard Liège (Belgium)	4–2	Austria Salzburg	3–1	1–1
Ceahlăul Piatra Neamţ (Romania)	2–5	Austria Wien	2–2	0–3
Zenit Saint Petersburg (Russia)	4–2	(Hungary) Tatabánya	2–1	2–1

=== First leg ===
15 July 2000

Celta Vigo (Spain)	3–0	(North Macedonia) Pelister
McCarthy 30', 80'; Cáceres 78'

Balaídos, Vigo
Attendance: 7,000
Referee: Goran Marić (Croatia)

16 July 2000

AaB (Denmark)	0–2	(Italy) Udinese
		Sosa 36', 72'

Aalborg Stadion, Aalborg
Attendance: 2,900
Referee: Roland Beck (Liechtenstein)

15 July 2000

Sedan (France)	0–0	(Germany) Wolfsburg

Stade Émile Albeau, Sedan
Attendance: 5,000
Referee: William Young (Scotland)

16 July 2000

Marila Příbram (Czech Republic)	0–0	(England) Aston Villa

Na Litavce, Příbram
Attendance: 7,852
Referee: Andreas Georgiou (Cyprus)

15 July 2000

Chmel Blšany (Czech Republic)	5–0	(Greece) Kalamata
Drobný 10'; Gedeon 12'; Hogen 54', 57'; Potůček 90'

FK Chmel Blšany, Blšany
Attendance: 1,011
Referee: Bernhard Brugger (Austria)

15 July 2000

Lens (France)	2–1	(Germany) Stuttgart
Sakho 17'; Sikora 88'		Dundee 66'

Stade Grimonprez-Jooris, Lille
Attendance: 6,000
Referee: Georgios Borovilos (Greece)

16 July 2000

Bradford City (England)	2–0	(Netherlands) RKC Waalwijk
Windass 50', 73' (pen.)

Valley Parade, Bradford
Attendance: 8,343
Referee: Hermann Albrecht (Germany)

16 July 2000

Rostselmash (Russia)	0–2	(France) Auxerre
		Deblock 5'; Jeunechamp 74'

Rostselmash Stadium, Rostov-on-Don
Attendance: 11,500
Referee: Leif Sundell (Sweden)

15 July 2000

Slaven Belupo (Croatia)	1–1	(Czech Republic) Sigma Olomouc
Geršak 15'		Zdráhal 25'

Gradski stadion, Koprivnica
Attendance: 3,000
Referee: Jouni Hyytiä (Finland)

15 July 2000

Standard Liège (Belgium)	3–1	Austria Salzburg
Lukunku 27'; Van Buyten 48'; El Yamani 85'		Früstük 31'

Stade Sclessin, Liège
Attendance: 7,000
Referee: Morgan Norman (Sweden)

15 July 2000

Ceahlăul Piatra Neamţ (Romania)	2–2	Austria Wien
Hrib 60' (pen.); Botez 78'		Derksen 14', 40'

Stadionul Ceahlăul, Piatra Neamț
Attendance: 2,000
Referee: Stéphane Moulin (France)

15 July 2000

Zenit Saint Petersburg (Russia)	2–1	(Hungary) Tatabánya
Horshkov 89'; Popovych 90+3'		Nagy 19'

Petrovsky Stadium, Saint Petersburg
Attendance: 12,500
Referee: Gylfi Thór Orrason (Iceland)

=== Second leg ===
22 July 2000

Pelister (North Macedonia)	1–2	(Spain) Celta Vigo
Momirovski 76'		Couñago 54'; Mena 62'

Stadion Tumbe Kafe, Bitola
Attendance: 6,000
Referee: Attila Ábrahám (Hungary)

Celta Vigo won 5–1 on aggregate.

22 July 2000

Udinese (Italy)	1–2	(Denmark) AaB
Muzzi 33'		Gaarde 14'; Boye 89'

Stadio Friuli, Udine
Attendance: 10,942
Referee: Steve Dunn (England)

Udinese won 3–2 on aggregate.

22 July 2000

Wolfsburg (Germany)	2–1	(France) Sedan
Akonnor 33'; Adjaoud 79' (o.g.)		Ndiefi 56'

VfL-Stadion am Elsterweg, Wolfsburg
Attendance: 4,500
Referee: Jon Skjervold (Norway)

Wolfsburg won 2–1 on aggregate.

22 July 2000

Aston Villa (England)	3–1	(Czech Republic) Marila Příbram
Dublin 8'; Taylor 57'; Nilis 62'		Kulič 20'

The Hawthorns, West Bromwich
Attendance: 8,200
Referee: Knud Stadsgaard (Denmark)

Aston Villa won 3–1 on aggregate.

22 July 2000

Kalamata (Greece)	0–3	(Czech Republic) Chmel Blšany
		Čáp 12'; Tichota 50'; Pazdera 73'

Messiniakos Stadium, Kalamata
Attendance: 1,631
Referee: José Mendes Pratas (Portugal)

Chmel Blšany won 8–0 on aggregate.

22 July 2000

Stuttgart (Germany)	1–0	(France) Lens
Bordon 6'

Gottlieb-Daimler-Stadion, Stuttgart
Attendance: 2,000
Referee: Erol Ersoy (Turkey)

2–2 on aggregate, Stuttgart won on away goals rule.

22 July 2000

RKC Waalwijk (Netherlands)	0–1	(England) Bradford City
		Mills 81'

Mandemakers Stadion, Waalwijk
Attendance: 3,700
Referee: Eduardo Iturralde González (Spain)

Bradford City won 3–0 on aggregate.

22 July 2000

Auxerre (France)	3–1	(Russia) Rostselmash
Guivarc'h 19'; Jeunechamp 37'; Boumsong 43'		Kirichenko 73'

Stade de l'Abbé-Deschamps, Auxerre
Attendance: 1,815
Referee: Jaroslav Jára (Czech Republic)

Auxerre won 5–1 on aggregate.

22 July 2000

Sigma Olomouc (Czech Republic)	2–0	(Croatia) Slaven Belupo
Hapal 63'; Zdráhal 73'

Andrův stadion, Olomouc
Attendance: 1,864
Referee: Oleg Chikun (Belarus)

Sigma Olomouc won 3–1 on aggregate.

22 July 2000

Austria Salzburg	1–1	(Belgium) Standard Liège
Laeßig 57'		Mornar 1'

Stadion Lehen, Salzburg
Attendance: 2,500
Referee: Dick van Egmond (Netherlands)

Standard Liège won 4–2 on aggregate.

22 July 2000

Austria Wien	3–0	(Romania) Ceahlăul Piatra Neamţ
Wagner 32'; Leitner 63'; Dospel 86'

Franz Horr Stadium, Vienna
Attendance: 2,000
Referee: Eric Blareau (Belgium)

Austria Wien won 5–2 on aggregate.

22 July 2000

Tatabánya (Hungary)	1–2	(Russia) Zenit Saint Petersburg
Bajkuša 88'		Ugarov 55'; Popovych 81'

Hungária körúti stadion, Budapest
Attendance: 2,500
Referee: John Rowbotham (Scotland)

Zenit Saint Petersburg won 4–2 on aggregate.

== Semi-finals ==
- Matches played 26 July and 2 August

Team 1	Agg.	Team 2	1st leg	2nd leg
Sigma Olomouc (Czech Republic)	3–1	(Czech Republic) Chmel Blšany	3–1	0–0
Stuttgart (Germany)	2–1	(Belgium) Standard Liège	1–1	1–0
Zenit Saint Petersburg (Russia)	4–0	(England) Bradford City	1–0	3–0
Celta Vigo (Spain)	3–1	(England) Aston Villa	1–0	2–1
Austria Wien	0–3	(Italy) Udinese	0–1	0–2
Auxerre (France)	3–2	(Germany) Wolfsburg	1–1	2–1 (a.e.t.)

=== First leg ===
26 July 2000
16:30

Sigma Olomouc (Czech Republic)	3–1	(Czech Republic) Chmel Blšany
Hapal 12'; Vlček 38' (pen.); Mucha 63'	Report	Tichota 3'

Andrův stadion, Olomouc
Attendance: 939
Referee: Nikolai Ivanov (Russia)

26 July 2000
20:15

Stuttgart (Germany)	1–1	(Belgium) Standard Liège
Thiam 68'	Report	Meyssen 59'

Wildparkstadion, Karlsruhe
Attendance: 1,516
Referee: Orhan Erdemir (Turkey)

26 July 2000
17:00

Zenit Saint Petersburg (Russia)	1–0	(England) Bradford City
Tarasov 16'	Report

Petrovsky Stadium, Saint Petersburg
Attendance: 1,900
Referee: Bruno Coué (France)

26 July 2000
21:30

Celta Vigo (Spain)	1–0	(England) Aston Villa
McCarthy 89'	Report

Balaídos, Vigo
Attendance: 9,550
Referee: Konrad Plautz (Austria)

26 July 2000
20:30

Austria Wien	0–1	(Italy) Udinese
	Report	Sosa 44'

Franz Horr Stadium, Vienna
Attendance: 7,000
Referee: Costas Kapitanis (Cyprus)

26 July 2000
20:30

Auxerre (France)	1–1	(Germany) Wolfsburg
Sebescen 71' (o.g.)	Report	Rische 21'

Stade de l'Abbé-Deschamps, Auxerre
Attendance: 1,455
Referee: Pasquale Rodomonti (Italy)

=== Second leg ===
2 August 2000
16:30

Chmel Blšany (Czech Republic)	0–0	(Czech Republic) Sigma Olomouc
	Report

FK Chmel Blšany, Blšany
Attendance: 800
Referee: Wolfgang Stark (Germany)

Sigma Olomouc won 3–1 on aggregate.

2 August 2000
20:00

Standard Liège (Belgium)	0–1	(Germany) Stuttgart
	Report	Dundee 27'

Stade Maurice Dufrasne, Liège
Attendance: 6,000
Referee: Sergey Shmolik (Belarus)

Stuttgart won 2–1 on aggregate.

2 August 2000
20:45

Bradford City (England)	0–3	(Russia) Zenit Saint Petersburg
	Report	Ugarov 68'; Haravoy 75'; Tarasov 85'

Valley Parade, Bradford
Attendance: 9,572
Referee: Miroslav Radoman (FR Yugoslavia)

Zenit Saint Petersburg won 4–0 on aggregate.

2 August 2000
20:45

Aston Villa (England)	1–2	(Spain) Celta Vigo
Barry 48' (pen.)	Report	McCarthy 11', 59'

The Hawthorns, West Bromwich
Attendance: 11,909
Referee: Dieter Schoch (Switzerland)

Celta Vigo won 3–1 on aggregate.

2 August 2000
21:00

Udinese (Italy)	2–0	Austria Wien
Sosa 8'; Muzzi 36'	Report

Stadio Friuli, Udine
Attendance: 22,000
Referee: Stuart Dougal (Scotland)

Udinese won 3–0 on aggregate.

2 August 2000
20:00

Wolfsburg (Germany)	1–2 (a.e.t.)	(France) Auxerre
Marić 50'	Report	Kłos 26'; Cissé 101'

VfL-Stadion, Wolfsburg
Attendance: 4,200
Referee: Attila Hanacsek (Hungary)

Auxerre won 3–2 on aggregate.

== Finals ==
- Matches played 8 & 22 August

Team 1	Agg.	Team 2	1st leg	2nd leg
Celta Vigo (Spain)	4–3	(Russia) Zenit Saint Petersburg	2–1	2–2
Sigma Olomouc (Czech Republic)	4–6	(Italy) Udinese	2–2	2–4 (a.e.t.)
Auxerre (France)	1–3	(Germany) Stuttgart	0–2	1–1

=== First leg ===
8 August 2000
20:30

Auxerre (France)	0–2	(Germany) Stuttgart
	Report	Thiam 18'; Balakov 72'

Stade de l'Abbé-Deschamps, Auxerre
Attendance: 8,000
Referee: Ľuboš Micheľ (Slovakia)

8 August 2000
20:45

Sigma Olomouc (Czech Republic)	2–2	(Italy) Udinese
Mucha 12'; Kovář 24' (pen.)	Report	Walem 35'; Sosa 65'

Andrův stadion, Olomouc
Attendance: 7,484
Referee: Stéphane Bré (France)

8 August 2000
21:30

Celta Vigo (Spain)	2–1	(Russia) Zenit Saint Petersburg
Karpin 22'; Juanfran 90+1'	Report	Igonin 8'

Balaídos, Vigo
Attendance: 18,000
Referee: Herbert Fandel (Germany)

=== Second leg ===
22 August 2000
17:00

Zenit Saint Petersburg (Russia)	2–2	(Spain) Celta Vigo
Popovych 30', 63'	Report	Karpin 83'; McCarthy 89'

Petrovsky Stadium, Saint Petersburg
Attendance: 22,000
Referee: Michel Piraeux (Belgium)

Celta Vigo won 4–3 on aggregate.

22 August 2000
18:15

Stuttgart (Germany)	1–1	(France) Auxerre
Balakov 61'	Report	Kapo 38'

Gottlieb-Daimler-Stadion, Stuttgart
Attendance: 12,000
Referee: Arturo Dauden Ibañez (Spain)

Stuttgart won 3–1 on aggregate.

22 August 2000
21:00

Udinese (Italy)	4–2 (a.e.t.)	(Czech Republic) Sigma Olomouc
Muzzi 88'; Alberto 90+3'; Sosa 99'; Margiotta 115'	Report	Hapal 43'; Mucha 90'

Stadio Friuli, Udine
Attendance: 26,000
Referee: Rune Pedersen (Norway)

Udinese won 6–4 on aggregate.

== See also ==
- 2000–01 UEFA Champions League
- 2000–01 UEFA Cup
