= 2000–01 Kalamata F.C. season =

Kalamata
2000–01 season
- Manager: Vasilis Georgopoulos
- Stadium: Kalamata Municipal Stadium
- Alpha Ethniki: 15th
- Greek Cup: First round
- UEFA Intertoto Cup: Third round

The 2000–01 season was Kalamata' 2nd straight season on the Greek first tier. The team had finished well the previous season and was set to play in Europe for the first time. However, the team was relegated, and also exited at first opportunity both in the domestic cup and Intertoto Cup, even fielding a reserve squad in the first leg of the latter competition.

== Players ==
=== Squad ===
No.	Pos	Nat	Player	Total		Alpha Ethniki		Intertoto Cup	
No.	Pos	Nat	Player	Apps	Goals	Apps	Goals	Apps	Goals
1	GK	(Greece) GRE	Christos Kelpekis	10	0	10	0	0	0
2	DF	(Greece) GRE	Aristidis Galanopoulos	12	0	11	0	1	0
4	DF	(Greece) GRE	Gerasimos Belevonis	26	0	25	0	1	0
5	DF	(Brazil) BRA	Claudio Alves Oliveira	22	0	21	0	1	0
6	DF	(Greece) GRE	Konstantinos Kalogiannidis	13	0	12	0	1	0
7	FW	(Brazil) BRA	Alessandro Soares	30	10	29	10	1	0
8	MF	(Greece) GRE	Kostas Frantzeskos	28	8	27	8	1	0
9	DF	(Greece) GRE	Stathis Kappos	16	1	14	1	2	0
10	DF	(Ghana) GHA	Charles Sampson	4	0	3	0	1	0
11	MF	(Ghana) GHA	Emanuel Bentil	21	0	20	0	1	0
12	DF	(Greece) GRE	Dimitrios Koutivas	3	0	2	0	1	0
13	GK	(Canada) CAN	Kenny Stamatopoulos	1	0	1	0	0	0
14	MF	(Greece) GRE	Christos Gantzoudis	9	0	9	0	0	0
17	DF	(Greece) GRE	Triantafyllos Macheridis	7	0	7	0	0	0
18	FW	(Greece) GRE	Thomas Troupkos	26	5	25	5	1	0
19	MF	(Argentina) ARG	Luis Darío Calvo	10	0	10	0	0	0
21	GK	(Greece) GRE	Sotiris Liberopoulos	20	0	19	0	1	0
22	MF	(Greece) GRE	Panagiotis Bachramis	17	4	17	4	0	0
23	DF	(Greece) GRE	Thanasis Sentementes	8	0	8	0	0	0
24	FW	(Cyprus) CYP	Giorgos Kavazis	19	1	19	1	0	0
25	FW	(Greece) GRE	Ilias Anastasakos	20	2	20	2	0	0
26	FW	(Brazil) BRA	Hilton Gerônimo	14	1	13	1	1	0
27	FW	(Greece) GRE	Christos Kalantzis	15	1	13	1	2	0
28	DF	(Argentina) ARG	Ariel Graña	5	0	5	0	0	0
29	MF	(Greece) GRE	Vangelis Kourentzis	1	0	0	0	1	0
30	DF	(Greece) GRE	Dimitrios Kapetanopoulos	21	0	21	0	0	0
33	DF	(Greece) GRE	Vangelis Nastos	26	1	26	1	0	0
34	FW	(Greece) GRE	Georgios Kravaris	1	0	1	0	0	0
35	MF	(Greece) GRE	Paschalis Melissas	1	0	0	0	1	0
36	DF	(Greece) GRE	Konstantinos Palmaras	7	0	7	0	0	0
37	DF	(Greece) GRE	Nikos Arganis	3	0	2	0	1	0
38	DF	(Greece) GRE	Petros Arganis	2	0	2	0	0	0
40	MF	(Greece) GRE	Fanouris Goundoulakis	2	0	1	0	1	0
41	MF	(Greece) GRE	Nikos Triantafyllakis	1	0	0	0	1	0
?	GK	(Greece) GRE	Konstantinos Zisimatis	1	0	0	0	1	0
?	DF	(Australia) AUS	John Tambouras	0	0	0	0	0	0
?	MF	(Greece) GRE	Fragiskos Keranis	0	0	0	0	0	0
?	MF	(Greece) GRE	Vasilis Begetis	0	0	0	0	0	0
?	MF	(Greece) GRE	Vangelis Tsoukalis	0	0	0	0	0	0
?	FW	(Greece) GRE	Konstantinos Mintziras	1	0	0	0	1	0

=== Players who left during the season ===
No.	Pos	Nat	Player	Total		Alpha Ethniki		Intertoto Cup	
No.	Pos	Nat	Player	Apps	Goals	Apps	Goals	Apps	Goals
17	DF	(Greece) GRE	Nikos Georgeas	6	0	5	0	1	0
19	MF	(Greece) GRE	Konstantinos Daskalakis	1	0	0	0	1	0
20	MF	(Ghana) GHA	Derek Boateng	11	4	10	4	1	0
33	MF	(Greece) GRE	Vasilis Kosyfologos	1	0	0	0	1	0
38	DF	(Greece) GRE	Vasilis Alevizos	2	0	1	0	1	0

== Managers ==
- Vasilis Georgopoulos: start of season – 30 June 2001

== Alpha Ethniki ==
=== League table ===
Pos	Team	Pld	W	D	L	GF	GA	GD	Pts	Qualification or relegation
12	OFI (O)	30	8	9	13	39	49	−10	33 (Note: Head-to-head points: Panachaiki 10, OFI 4, PAS Giannina 2.)	Qualification for relegation play-off
13	PAS Giannina (R)	30	8	9	13	40	53	−13	33	Qualification for relegation play-off
14	Paniliakos (R)	30	7	8	15	26	46	−20	29	Qualification for relegation play-off
15	Kalamata (R)	30	4	9	17	39	66	−27	21	Relegation to Beta Ethniki
16	Athinaikos (R)	30	5	5	20	37	65	−28	20	Relegation to Beta Ethniki

Source: Galanis Sports Data
Rules for classification: 1) Points; 2) Head-to-head points; 3) Head-to-head goal difference; 4) Goal difference; 5) Goals scored; 6) Goals against; 7) Play-offs (neutral ground); 8) Draw.
(Note: Criterion 7 is only used if needed to decide champion, teams for relegation or teams for UEFA competitions).
(O) Play-off winners; (R) Relegated

=== Greek Cup ===
==== Group 6 ====
Pos	Team	Pld	W	D	L	GF	GA	GD	Pts	Qualification	ARIS	PNS	AKR	LEO	KLM	LYK
1	Aris	10	6	3	1	16	9	+7	21	Round of 16		2–0	3–3	2–1	1–0	1–0
2	Panserraikos	10	5	3	2	16	8	+8	18	Round of 16	0–0		2–1	4–1	1–0	4–1
3	Akratitos	10	4	3	3	16	14	+2	15		1–2	1–1		0–0	1–2	2–1
4	Leonidio	10	3	3	4	10	15	−5	12		2–1	1–0	1–2		2–2	1–0
5	Kalamata	10	3	2	5	13	13	0	11		1–1	1–2	0–1	4–1		2–1
6	ILTEX Lykoi	10	1	2	7	8	20	−12	5		1–3	0–0	2–4	0–0	2–1	

Source: epo.gr

==== Matches ====
7 August 2000 1	Kalamata	1–1	Aris	Kalamata
13:00 EEST	Soares 25'	Report (page 1)	Liolidis 17'	Stadium: Kalamata Municipal Stadium

10 August 2000 2	Leonidio	2–2	Kalamata	Leonidio
13:00 EEST	Klokidis 35', 60'	Report (page 1-2)	Kavazis 3'; Soares 86'	Stadium: Leonidio Municipal Stadium

August 2000 3	Kalamata	1–2	Panserraikos	Kalamata
13:00 EEST	Anastasakos 68'	Report (page 2-3)	Iliopoulos 1', 28'; Tsifoutis 40'	Stadium: Kalamata Municipal Stadium

21 August 2000 4	Akratitos	1–2	Kalamata	Ano Liosia
13:00 EEST	Đokić 75'	Report (page 3)	Boateng 52'; Soares 71'	Stadium: Ano Liosia Municipal Stadium

24 August 2000 5	Kalamata	2–1	ILTEX Lykoi	Kalamata
13:00 EEST	Belevonis 20'; Boateng 26'	Report (page 3-4)	P. Pappas 60'	Stadium: Kalamata Municipal Stadium

27 August 2000 6	Aris	1–0	Kalamata	Thessaloniki
13:00 EEST	Charisteas 55'	Report (page 4)		Stadium: Kleanthis Vikelidis Stadium

6 September 2000 7	Kalamata	4–1	Leonidio	Kalamata
13:00 EEST	Frantzeskos 16'; Soares 38'; Troupkos 56', 77'	Report (page 3)	De Sousa 67'	Stadium: Kalamata Municipal Stadium

10 September 2000 8	Panserraikos	1–0	Kalamata	Serres
13:00 EEST	Iliopoulos 8'	Report (page 5)		Stadium: Serres Municipal Stadium

4 October 2000 9	Kalamata	0–1	Akratitos	Kalamata
13:00 EEST		Report (page 5-6)	Topuzov 90' (pen.)	Stadium: Kalamata Municipal Stadium

29 November 2000 10	ILTEX Lykoi	2–1	Kalamata	Thessaloniki
13:00 EET	Mitsopoulos 5'; Kourentzis 38' (o.g.)	Report (page 6)	Kalantzis 33'	Stadium: Stelios Iliadis Stadium

== UEFA Intertoto Cup ==
=== Third round ===
15 July 2000 First leg	Chmel Blšany (Czech Republic)	5–0	(Greece) Kalamata	Blšany, Czech Republic
	Drobný 10'; Gedeon 12'; Hogen 54', 57'; Potůček 90'	Report		Stadium: FK Chmel Blšany; Attendance: 1,011; Referee: Bernhard Brugger (Austria)

22 July 2000 Second leg	Kalamata (Greece)	0–3 (0–8 agg.)	(Czech Republic) Chmel Blšany	Kalamata, Greece
		Report	Čáp 12'; Tichota 49'; Pazdera 72'	Stadium: Messiniakos Stadium; Attendance: 1,631; Referee: José Mendes Pratas (Portugal)
