= Memić =

Memić or Memiç is a surname. Notable people with the surname include:

- Almir Memić (footballer, born 1962), Bosnian football manager and former footballer
- Almir Memić (footballer, born 1975), Bosnian former footballer
- Amar Memić (born 2001), Bosnian footballer
- Dalio Memić (born 1990), Bosnian footballer
- Gizem Memiç (born 1990), Turkish beauty pageant contestant from Gaziantep who won Miss Turkey 2010
- Haris Memic (born 1995), Dutch footballer
- Husein Memić (born 1983), Serbian politician
- Muhamed Memić (born 1960), Yugoslav handball player who competed in the 1988 Summer Olympics
- Seid Memić (born 1950), Bosnian singer and the vocalist for the Yugoslav rock band Teška industrija
