= Udinese Calcio in European football =

Italian club in European football

- Club: Udinese
- Seasons played: 10
- First entry: 1997–98 UEFA Cup
- Latest entry: 2013–14 UEFA Europa League

Titles
- Intertoto Cup: 1: 2000

These are the matches that Udinese have played in European football competitions. The club's first entry into European competitions was in the 1997–98 UEFA Cup, with their only trophy coming in the 2000 UEFA Intertoto Cup.

== UEFA-organised seasonal competitions ==
Udinese's score listed first.

=== UEFA Champions League ===
Season	Round	Club	Home	Away	Aggregate	Reference
2005–06	Third qualifying round	(Portugal) Sporting CP	3–2	1–0	4–2	
2005–06	Group C	(Greece) Panathinaikos	3–0	2–1	3rd	
2005–06	Group C	(Spain) Barcelona	0–2	1–4	3rd	
2005–06	Group C	(Germany) Werder Bremen	1–1	3–4	3rd	
2011–12	Play-off Round	(England) Arsenal	1–2	0–1	1–3	
2012–13	Play-off round	(Portugal) Braga	1–1	1–1	2–2, 4–5 (p)	

=== UEFA Cup and Europa League ===
Season	Round	Club	Home	Away	Aggregate	Reference
1997–98	First Round	(Poland) Widzew Łódź	3–0	0–1	3–1	
1997–98	Second Round	(Netherlands) Ajax	2–1	0–1	2–2 (a)	
1998–99	First Round	(Germany) Bayer Leverkusen	1–1	0–1	1–2	
1999–2000	First Round	(Denmark) AaB	1–0	2–1	3–1	
1999–2000	Second Round	(Poland) Legia Warsaw	1–0	1–1	2–1	
1999–2000	Third Round	(Germany) Bayer Leverkusen	0–1	2–1	2–2 (a)	
1999–2000	Fourth Round	(Czech Republic) Slavia Prague	2–1	0–1	2–2 (a)	
2000–01	First Round	(Poland) Polonia Warsaw	2–0	1–0	3–0	
2000–01	Second Round	(Greece) PAOK	1–0	0–3 (aet)	1–3	
2003–04	First Round	(Austria) Salzburg	1–2	1–0	2–2 (a)	
2004–05	First Round	(Greece) Panionios	1–0	1–3	2–3	
2005–06	Round of 32	(France) Lens	3–0	0–1	3–1	
2005–06	Round of 16	(Bulgaria) Levski Sofia	0–0	1–2	1–2	
2008–09	First Round	(Germany) Borussia Dortmund	0–2	2–0	2–2, 4–3 (p)	
2008–09	Group D	(England) Tottenham Hotspur	2–0	—N/a	1st	
2008–09	Group D	(Russia) Spartak Moscow	—N/a	2–1	1st	
2008–09	Group D	(Croatia) Dinamo Zagreb	2–1	—N/a	1st	
2008–09	Group D	(Netherlands) N.E.C.	—N/a	0–2	1st	
2008–09	Round of 32	(Poland) Lech Poznań	2–1	2–2	4–3	
2008–09	Round of 16	(Russia) Zenit St.Petersburg	2–0	0–1	2–1	
2008–09	Quarter-finals	(Germany) Werder Bremen	3–3	1–3	4–6	
2011–12	Group I	(France) Rennes	2–1	0–0	2nd	
2011–12	Group I	(Scotland) Celtic	1–1	1–1	2nd	
2011–12	Group I	(Spain) Atlético Madrid	2–0	0–4	2nd	
2011–12	Round of 32	(Greece) PAOK	0–0	3–0	3–0	
2011–12	Round of 16	(Netherlands) AZ Alkmaar	2–1	0–2	2–3	
2012–13	Group A	(Russia) Anzhi	1–1	0–2	4th	
2012–13	Group A	(Switzerland) Young Boys	2–3	1–3	4th	
2012–13	Group A	(England) Liverpool	0–1	3–2	4th	
2013–14	Third Qualifying Round	(Bosnia and Herzegovina) Široki Brijeg	4–0	3–1	7–1	
2013–14	Play-off Round	(Czech Republic) Slovan Liberec	1–3	1–1	2–4	

=== UEFA Intertoto Cup ===
Season	Round	Club	Home	Away	Aggregate	Reference
2000	Third Round	(Denmark) AaB	1–2	2–0	3–2	
2000	Semi-finals	Austria Wien	2–0	1–0	3–0	
2000	Final	(Czech Republic) Sigma Olomouc	4–2 (aet)	2–2	6–4	

== Overall record ==
=== UEFA Competitions record ===
Accurate as of 29 August 2013

Competition	Played	Won	Drew	Lost	GF	GA	GD	Win%
European Cup / Champions League	12	4	3	5	17	19	−2	33.33
UEFA Cup / UEFA Europa League	58	26	11	21	72	65	+7	44.83
UEFA Intertoto Cup	6	4	1	1	12	6	+6	66.67
Total	76	34	15	27	101	90	+11	44.74

Source: UEFA.com
Pld = Matches played; W = Matches won; D = Matches drawn; L = Matches lost; GF = Goals for; GA = Goals against; GD = Goal Difference.
