= Andreas Ioannides =

Andreas Ioannides may refer to:

- Andreas Ioannides (footballer), Cypriot footballer
- Andreas Ioannides (naval officer), head of the Cyprus Navy
