= Jiří Sýkora =

Jiří Sýkora may refer to:

- Jiří Sýkora (decathlete) (born 1995), Czech athlete
- Jiří Sýkora (footballer) (born 1977), Czech footballer
- Jiří Sýkora (runner) (born 1954), Czech long-distance runner
