= Mumcu =

Mumcu (from the Turkish noun mum ("candle") followed by the actuator suffix -cu, therefore literally "chandler") is a Turkish surname. Notable people with the surname include:

- Ali Mumcu, Turkish footballer
- Erkan Mumcu, Turkish politician
- Güldal Mumcu (born 1951), Turkish politician
- Özgür Mumcu (born 1977), Turkish writer and journalist
- Uğur Mumcu (1942–1993), Turkish investigative journalist
