= Dalio =

Dalio is a surname. It may refer to:

- Dalio Memić (born 1990), Bosnian-Herzegovinian footballer
- Marcel Dalio (1899–1983), French character actor of Jewish origin
- Paul Dalio (born 1979), American screenwriter, director and composer, son of Ray Dalio
- Ray Dalio (born 1949), American billionaire investor, hedge fund manager and philanthropist, father of Paul Dalio
