= Almir Memić =

Almir Memić may refer to:

- Almir Memić (footballer, born 1962), Bosnian football manager and former footballer
- Almir Memić (footballer, born 1975), Bosnian former footballer
