= Blecha =

Blecha (feminine: Blechová) is a Czech surname meaning 'flea'. Notable people with the surname include:

- Filip Blecha (born 1997), Czech footballer
- Kurt Blecha (1923–2013), German politician
- Norbert Blecha (born 1950), Austrian film producer
- Oldřich Blecha, Czech table tennis player
- Peter Blecha, American historian and author
- Petr Blecha (born 1970), Czech rower
