= Hennadiy Popovych =

Ukrainian footballer

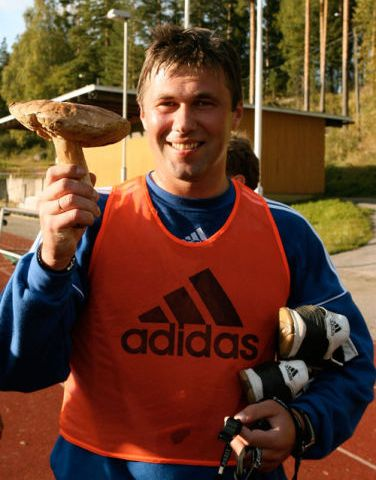

Personal information
- Full name: Hennadiy Ivanovych Popovych
- Date of birth: 9 February 1973
- Place of birth: Dniprodzerzhynsk, Ukrainian SSR
- Date of death: 4 June 2010 (aged 37)
- Place of death: Saint-Petersburg, Russia
- Height: 1.91 m (6 ft 3 in)
- Position: Striker

Youth career
- 1989: Dnipro Dnipropetrovsk
- 1990: Prometei Dniprodzerzhynsk
- 1991: Dnipro Dnipropetrovsk

Senior career*
Years	Team	Apps	(Gls)
1991–1993	Kryvbas Kryvyi Rih	66	(4)
1992	Prometei Dniprodzerzhynsk	1	(2)
1994	Zirka Kirovohrad	17	(5)
1994–1995	Kryvbas Kryvyi Rih	25	(3)
1995	Shakhtar Donetsk	3	(0)
1995	→ Shakhtar-2 Donetsk	3	(0)
1996–1997	Kryvbas Kryvyi Rih	38	(5)
1997–2001	Zenit Saint Petersburg	109	(30)

International career
1995	Ukraine U21	1	(0)

Managerial career
- 2002–2005: FC Zenit Saint Petersburg (administrator)
- 2005–2006: FC Zenit Saint Petersburg (reserves assistant)
- 2007: FC Zenit Saint Petersburg (reserves administrator)
- * Club domestic league appearances and goals

Hennadiy Ivanovych Popovych (Ukrainian: Геннадій Іванович Попович; Russian: Геннадий Иванович Попович) (9 February 1973 – 4 June 2010) was a Ukrainian professional footballer. He was born in Dniprodzerzhynsk. He made his professional debut in the Soviet Second League B in 1991 for FC Kryvbas Kryvyi Rih.

== Biography ==
Popovych was a trainee of the sport academy of Mettalurg from Dniprodzerzhynsk. He was playing for various teams at the early stage of his career including Prometei (1990), Kryvbas (1991–1994), Zirka (1994–1995), Shakhtar (1995–1996). In 1997, he moved to Russia, where he started to play for Zenit from Saint Petersburg, where he performed more than 100 caps and scored 41 goal. Together with "Zenit" he reached a peak of his career. In 2000, he scored two goals in the final of Intertoto Cup against Celta. Popovych himself later recalled these times as the happiest period in his life and also during professional career. In 2001 Popovych won the bronze medal of Russian championship with Zenit also being the first sniper of the team in the season of 2001. In autumn of 2001 Popovich felt sick while season was not yet finished. Later on, he noted that his conditions get worsened at every new training. In the end of 2001 according to strong recommendation from medics, he finished his football career due to the problems with heart (two consecutive infarcts of pulmonary and heart systems respectively).

Former chief doctor of Zenit, Mikhail Grishin later mentioned this period in Popovych's life pointing out that "Popovych could not live without football, how could you stop him from doing it?".

Between 2002 and 2005 he was working as an administrator of Zenit. Between 2005 and 2008 he was a coach of Zenit youth team. In 2009 Popovych became a coach of Zenit Academy and since 2010 youth team of Lokomotiv. In his spare time he liked playing hockey and fishing.

Popovych died on 4 June 2010 after a heart attack. 4 days after the visitation was organized at the Petrovskiy Stadium. He was buried at Smolensky Cemetery in Saint Petersburg.

For Zenit and St. Petersburg in general, Popovych has remained one of the most prominent players for pre-Gazprom (before 2006) Zenit history. According to Andrey Arshavin, Popovych was the only example of a physically powerful center forward (classic number nine) who has successfully adapted to traditionally high-speed play style of Zenit. Despite Popovych has never succeeded to become a crucial member of Ukraine national football team, Valeriy Lobanovskiy appreciated the style of Popovych and staked hopes on him in the beginning of 21st century. By some unofficial estimates, Popovych is often recognized as one of the most impactful Ukrainian players who ever played football in post-Soviet Russia.

In January 2011 in the youth sport complex Zenit the tournament in the name of Popovych was organized.

In June 2012 on the Petrovskiy Stadium Zenit fans opened the memorial tablet dedicated to Popovych.

== In popular culture ==
Saint Petersburg band "Bivny" mentioned Popovich in their song "Forwards" ("Форварды" in Russian).

== Honours ==
- Russian Premier League bronze: 2001.
- Russian Cup winner: 1999.
- Russian Cup finalist: 2002 (played in the early stages of the 2001/02 tournament for FC Zenit Saint Petersburg).

== European club competitions ==
With FC Zenit Saint Petersburg.

- UEFA Cup 1999–2000: 2 games.
- UEFA Intertoto Cup 2000: 7 games, 5 goals.
