= Vladimir Nagibin =

Russian footballer

Personal information
- Full name: Vladimir Vladimirovich Nagibin
- Date of birth: 12 October 1981 (age 45)
- Place of birth: Leningrad, Russian SFSR
- Height: 1.75 m (5 ft 9 in)
- Position: Midfielder

Senior career*
Years	Team	Apps	(Gls)
1999–2000	FC Zenit-2 St. Petersburg	55	(2)
2000–2001	FC Zenit St. Petersburg	12	(0)
2002	FC Metallurg Lipetsk	36	(3)
2003	FC Zenit-2 St. Petersburg	35	(4)
2004–2005	FC Metallurg Lipetsk	78	(3)
2006–2007	FC Sibir Novosibirsk	43	(6)
2008	FC KAMAZ Naberezhnye Chelny	11	(2)
2010–2011	FC Sever Murmansk	53	(5)
- * Club domestic league appearances and goals

Vladimir Vladimirovich Nagibin (Russian: Владимир Владимирович Нагибин; born 12 October 1981) is a Russian former professional footballer.

== Club career ==
He made his professional debut in the Russian Second Division in 1999 for FC Zenit-2 St. Petersburg. He played 4 games and scored 1 goal in the UEFA Intertoto Cup 2000 for FC Zenit St. Petersburg.

== Honours ==
- Russian Cup finalist: 2002 (played in the early stages of the 2001/02 tournament for FC Zenit St. Petersburg).
