= Ivan Stoychev =

Bulgarian gymnast

- Иван Стойчев
- Born: 6 July 1906

Gymnastics career
- Discipline: Men's artistic gymnastics
- Country represented: Bulgaria

Ivan Stoychev (Bulgarian: Иван Стойчев) (born 6 July 1906, date of death unknown) was a Bulgarian gymnast. He competed in eight events at the 1936 Summer Olympics.
