= Makis Belevonis =

Greek footballer (born 1975)

Personal information
- Full name: Gerasimos Belevonis
- Date of birth: 19 December 1975 (age 50)
- Place of birth: Kalyvia, Aetolia-Acarnania, Greece
- Height: 1.76 m (5 ft 9 in)
- Position: Defender

Youth career
- PAO Kalyvion

Senior career*
Years	Team	Apps	(Gls)
1992–1997	Panetolikos	112	(5)
1997–2001	Kalamata	104	(2)
2001–2007	OFI	128	(3)
2007–2012	Panetolikos	79	(7)
Total		423	(17)
- * Club domestic league appearances and goals

Makis Belevonis (Greek: Μάκης Μπελεβώνης, born 19 December 1975) is a Greek former professional footballer who played as a right back.

Belevonis spent many years in the Greek first division with OFI, Kalamata and Panetolikos.
