= Kurt Blecha =

German politician

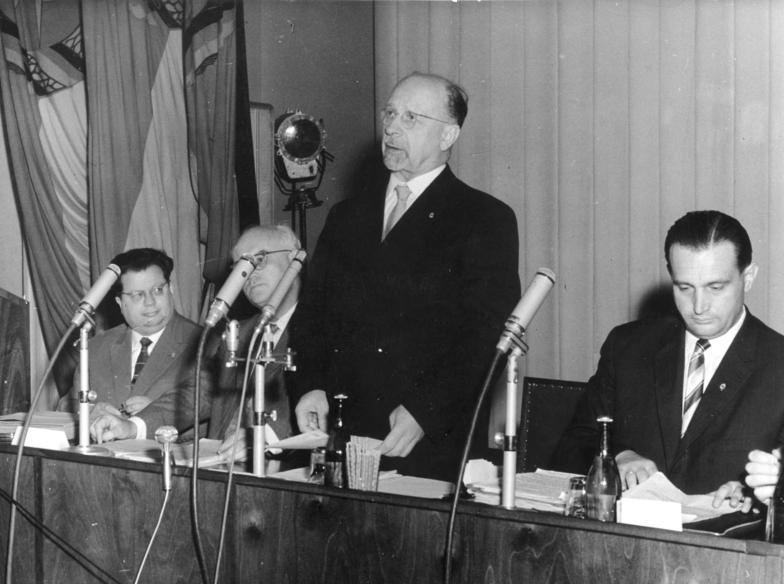

Kurt Blecha (February 25, 1923 – March 1, 2013) was a German politician. He was a Socialist Unity Party of Germany (SED) official and head of the press office, and the chairman of the Council of Ministers of the GDR.

Blecha was born in Ústí nad Labem, Czechoslovakia. Blecha joined the Nazi Party in 1941 and was drafted into military service. He came in 1943 in Soviet captivity and was active in the National Committee for a Free Germany.

He joined the SED in 1946. From the 1950s to 1989 he was part of the Board of the Journalists Association of the GDR. From 1953 to 1958 he was deputy director and then as successor to Fritz Beyling until 1989 in the Head of the Press Office to the Chairman of the Ministers of the GDR.

Blecha was awarded, inter alia, the Patriotic Order of Merit in 1983 and 1988 with the honor Clasp to the Patriotic Order of Merit.

His daughter, Sigrid, was the second wife of East German foreign buyer Alexander Schalck-Golodkowski.

== Literature ==
- Untersuchungsausschuß Freiheitlicher Juristen (Hrsg.): Ehemalige Nationalsozialisten in Pankows Diensten, Berlin-Zehlendorf, o. J., S. 10.
