= Dejan Pavličić =

Croatian footballer

Personal information
- Date of birth: 19 September 1979 (age 47)
- Place of birth: Vinkovci, SR Croatia, SFR Yugoslavia
- Height: 1.73 m (5 ft 8 in)
- Position: Midfielder

Senior career*
| Years | Team | Apps | (Gls) |
| 2000–2007 | Cibalia | 110+ | (7+) |
| 2007 | Vinogradar | | |
| 2008 | Suhopolje | | |
| 2008 | Imotski | | |
| 2008-2014 | Zrinski Tordinci | | |
| 2015 | Dilj | | |
- * Club domestic league appearances and goals

Dejan Pavličić (born 19 September 1979) is a retired Croatian football midfielder.
