= FK Chmel Blšany (stadium) =

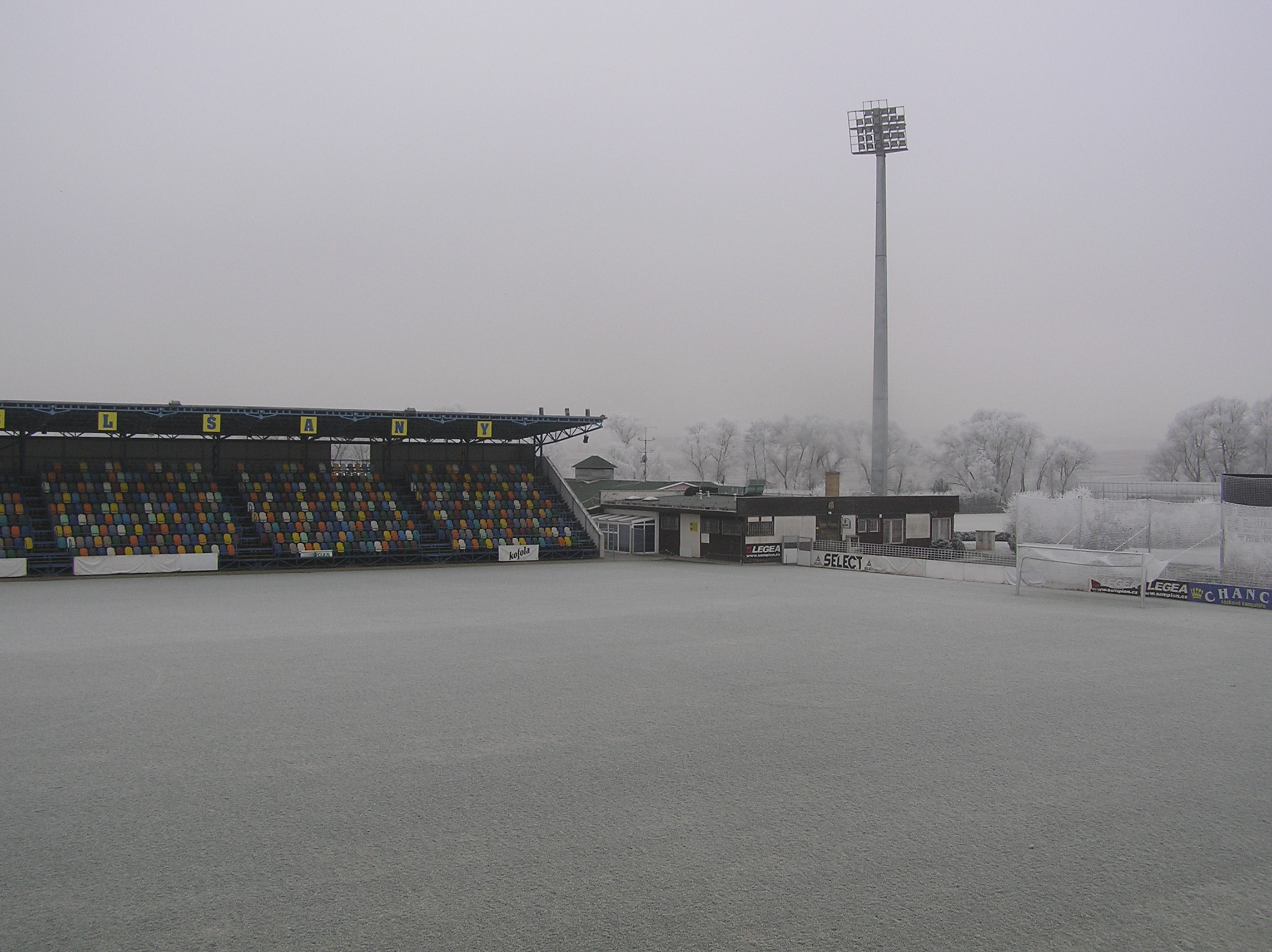
- Interactive map of FK Chmel Blšany (stadium)
- Location: U Stadiónu 10; Blšany; Czech Republic
- Coordinates: 50°12′56.05″N 13°27′58.45″E
- Owner: Blšany
- Capacity: 2,300
- Surface: Grass
- Field size: 105m x 68m

Construction
- Renovated: 2004

Tenant
- FK Chmel Blšany

FK Chmel Blšany is a multi-purpose stadium in Blšany, Czech Republic. It is currently used mostly for football matches and is the home ground of FK Chmel Blšany. The stadium holds 2,300 seated spectators.

In 1998–2006, the Czech First League was played there, as FK Chmel Blšany appeared in the top flight of Czech football. Currently the Czech Fourth Division is played there.

== History ==
Before the reconstruction in 2003, the stadium was able to hold 4,500 people. The club was forced to play home matches at Stadion Na Litavce in Příbram during the 2003–04 Czech First League due to the width of the pitch being smaller than the required 68 metres. The club returned to their home stadium in February 2004 following reconstruction.

Later in 2004, Czech First League matches were again moved from Blšany, this time due to Blšany's stadium not having sufficient artificial lighting. During this time the team played home matches in Prague at FK Viktoria Stadion.
