= Vasilios Kosyfologos =

Greek footballer

Personal information
- Full name: Vasilios Kosyfologos
- Date of birth: 6 January 1982 (age 44)
- Position: Midfielder

Senior career*
| Years | Team | Apps | (Gls) |
| 1999–2000 | Kalamata | 1 | (0) |
| 2000–2001 | Athinaikos | 6 | (0) |
- * Club domestic league appearances and goals

Vasilios Kosyfologos (Greek: Βασίλειος Κοσυφολόγος; born 6 January 1982) is a retired Greek football midfielder.
