= Nikos Triantafyllakis =

Greek footballer

Personal information
- Full name: Nikolaos Triantafyllakis
- Date of birth: 1 January 1983 (age 43)
- Place of birth: Agrinio, Greece
- Height: 1.68 m (5 ft 6 in)
- Position: Midfielder

Senior career*
Years	Team	Apps	(Gls)
2000–2004	Kalamata		
2004–2006	Panetolikos		
2006–2007	Thyella Patras		
2007	Rodos		
2007–2008	AER Afantou		
2008–2010	Thiva		
2010	Iraklis Psachna		
2011	Panegialios		
2011–2014	Kalamata		
2014–2015	Pamisos Messini		
- * Club domestic league appearances and goals

Nikos Triantafyllakis (Greek: Νικος Τριανταφυλλάκης; born 1 January 1983) is a retired Greek football midfielder.

He made his professional debut for Kalamata in the 2000 Intertoto Cup against FK Chmel Blšany. In addition to two spells in Kalamata he played for a string of lower-league clubs.
