= Zbigniew Grzybowski =

Polish footballer

Personal information
- Full name: Zbigniew Grzybowski
- Date of birth: 1 January 1976 (age 50)
- Place of birth: Tczew, Poland
- Height: 1.79 m (5 ft 10 in)
- Position: Left winger

Team information
- Current team: Arka Trzebnice
- Number: 6

Senior career*
Years	Team	Apps	(Gls)
1993–1994	Wisła Tczew		
1995–1996	Zawisza Bydgoszcz		
1997–2002	Zagłębie Lubin	165	(32)
2003	Wacker Burghausen	21	(0)
2004–2006	Amica Wronki	54	(6)
2006	Górnik Łęczna	3	(0)
2007	Zagłębie Lubin	7	(0)
2007	Górnik Polkowice		
2007–2008	Olympiakos Nicosia	20	(1)
2008–2011	Górnik Polkowice	75	(45)
2011–2013	Chrobry Głogów	31	(4)
2013	Warta Bolesławiecka		
2013	Stal Chocianów		
2014–2015	Warta Bolesławiecka		
2015–2016	Czarni Rokitki		
2017	LZS Łaziska		
2017	Chrobry Nowogrodziec	10	(3)
2018	Victoria Parchów	18	(10)
2019–2020	Chojnowianka Chojnów	35	(7)
2021	Kalina Sobin	21	(8)
2022–2024	Warta Bolesławiecka	32	(8)
2024–	Arka Trzebnice	9	(0)

Managerial career
- Stal Chocianów
- 2012–2013: Warta Bolesławiecka (player-manager)
- Czarni Rokitki
- Chrobry Nowogrodziec (player-manager)
- Victoria Parchów
- Kłos Moskorzyn
- 2018–2021: Chojnowianka Chojnów
- * Club domestic league appearances and goals as of 1 January 2025

Zbigniew Grzybowski (born 1 January 1976) is a Polish footballer who plays as a winger for Arka Trzebnice.

== Career ==
He played as a midfielder for Olympiakos Nicosia and at several Polish clubs.

== Honours ==
Zagłębie Lubin

- Ekstraklasa: 2006–07

Górnik Polkowice

- III liga Lower Silesia-Lubusz: 2008–09

Chojnowianka Chojnów

- Klasa A Legnica III: 2019–20
