= Michal Kovář =

Czech footballer (born 1973)

Personal information
- Date of birth: 8 September 1973 (age 53)
- Place of birth: Olomouc, Czechoslovakia
- Height: 1.80 m (5 ft 11 in)
- Position: Defender

Team information
- Current team: 1. HFK Olomouc
- Number: 2

Youth career
- 1980–1991: Sigma Olomouc

Senior career*
Years	Team	Apps	(Gls)
1991–2001	Sigma Olomouc	289	(9)
2001–2002	SSV Reutlingen	28	(2)
2002–2004	Hansa Rostock	23	(0)
2004–2006	Sigma Olomouc	55	(1)
2006–2007	Fotbal Fulnek		
2007	→ FC Hlučín (loan)	0	(0)
2007–2009	Fotbal Fulnek	10	(0)
2010–2012	1. HFK Olomouc	27	(5)

International career
1994–1995	Czech Republic U-21	4	(0)
- * Club domestic league appearances and goals as of 1 July 2011

Michal Kovář (born 8 September 1973) is a Czech former footballer. He spent two seasons in the Bundesliga with F.C. Hansa Rostock. He represented his country at under-21 level between 1994 and 1995.

== Career ==
Kovář started his career with Sigma Olomouc.
