= Jürgen Leitner =

Austrian footballer

Personal information
- Date of birth: 18 October 1975 (age 51)
- Place of birth: Vienna, Austria
- Height: 1.83 m (6 ft 0 in)
- Position: Midfielder

Youth career
- Austria Wien

Senior career*
Years	Team	Apps	(Gls)
1994-2001	Austria Wien	204	(6)
2001-2003	Xanthi	43	(0)
2003-2006	First Vienna		
2006-2008	Wiener Sport-Club	4+	(0+)
2008	FAC	14	(0)
2009	Stockerau	15	(3)
2009	Großrußbach	7	(0)
- * Club domestic league appearances and goals

Jürgen Leitner (born 18 October 1975) is an Austrian former footballer who last played as a midfielder for Großrußbach.

== Career ==
Leitner started his career with Austria Wien, Austria's most successful club.

In 2001, he signed for Xanthi in Greece, where he was voted as their best player.

At the age of 28, Leitner retired from professional football after almost signing for Spanish second division side Numancia.
