= Luděk Zdráhal =

Czech footballer

Personal information
- Full name: Luděk Zdráhal
- Date of birth: 12 September 1969 (age 57)
- Place of birth: Prostějov, Czechoslovakia
- Position: Striker

Senior career*
Years	Team	Apps	(Gls)
?–?	SK Prostějov	-	(-)
?–?	VTJ Znojmo	-	(-)
?–?	FK Drnovice	-	(-)
1995–1996	LeRK Brno	15	(0)
1996–1997	Baník Ostrava	26	(2)
1997–1988	SK Prostějov	21	(6)
1998–1999	Bohemians Praha	43	(16)
1999–2000	Göztepe	8	(1)
2000–2002	Sigma Olomouc	37	(2)
2001	→ SK Prostějov (loan)	5	(1)
2002	→ Zlín (loan)	5	(2)
2002–2003	1. HFK Olomouc	-	(-)
- * Club domestic league appearances and goals

Luděk Zdráhal (born 12 September 1969) is a retired football striker.

== Club career ==
Born in Prostějov, Zdráhal began playing football with local side SK Prostějov. He had spells in the Czech 2. liga with LeRK Brno, Prostějov and FC Bohemians Praha. He also made 80 appearances in the Czech Gambrinus liga with FC Baník Ostrava, Bohemians and SK Sigma Olomouc.

In November 1999, Göztepe S.K. manager Jozef Jarabinský signed Zdráhal to play for the Süper Lig side for six months. After his success as a goal-scorer in the 2. liga, Olomouc had hopes of Zdráhal reproducing his form in the first division when they signed him in 2000. After struggling for playing time, Zdráhal went on loan to FK Zlín in 2002.
