= Ali Mumcu =

Turkish footballer

Personal information
- Full name: Ali Mumcu
- Date of birth: 1 January 1979 (age 47)
- Place of birth: Akçaabat, Turkey
- Position: Midfielder

Senior career*
Years	Team	Apps	(Gls)
1997–2001	Kocaelispor	14	(0)
2000–2001	→ İzmitspor (loan)		
2001–2004	Pendikspor		
2004–2005	Kocaelispor	2	(0)
2005–2006	Erzurumspor		
2006–2007	Arsinspor		
2007–2009	Gölcükspor		
2009–2011	Göztepe	25	(5)
- * Club domestic league appearances and goals

Ali Mumcu (born 1 January 1979 in Akçaabat) is a Turkish professional footballer who last played as a midfielder for Göztepe in the TFF Second League.

He formerly played for Kocaelispor, İzmitspor, Pendikspor, Erzurumspor, Arsinspor and Gölcükspor. He appeared in fourteen Süper Lig matches during the 1997–98 and 1999-00 seasons and two TFF First League matches during the 2004-05 season with Kocaelispor.
