= Karel Tichota =

Czech footballer

Personal information
- Date of birth: 19 January 1975 (age 51)
- Height: 1.83 m (6 ft 0 in)
- Position: Defender

Senior career*
Years	Team	Apps	(Gls)
1993–1996	Union Cheb		
1996–2004	Chmel Blšany		
2003–2004	→ Opava (loan)		
2004–2009	Union Cheb		
2009–2013	Karlovy Vary		
2013–2014	FK Ostrov		

Managerial career
- 2014–2018: Karlovy Vary
- 2019–: Baník Sokolov (academy)
- * Club domestic league appearances and goals

Karel Tichota (born 19 January 1975) is a Czech former football defender. He played 179 matches in the Czech First League, representing Union Cheb, Chmel Blšany, and Opava.
