= Blšany =

- Town
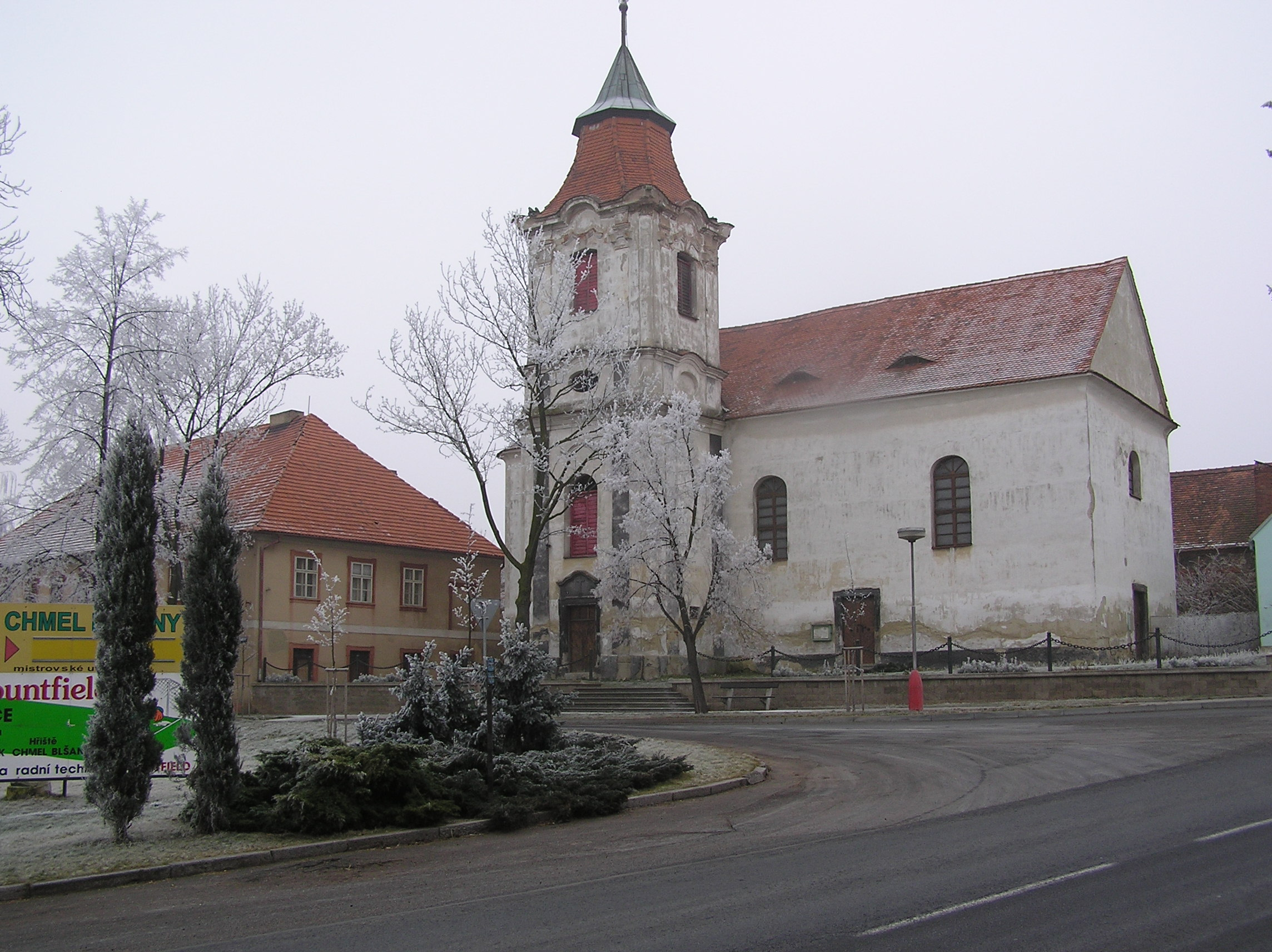
- Church of Saint Michael

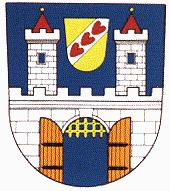
- Coat of arms

- Location in the Czech Republic
- Coordinates: 50°13′20″N 13°28′35″E
- Country: Czech Republic
- Region: Ústí nad Labem
- District: Louny
- First mentioned: 1238

Area
  - Total: 36.34 km^{2} (14.03 sq mi)
- Elevation: 199 m (653 ft)

Population (2026-01-01)
  - Total: 1,039
  - Density: 28.59/km^{2} (74.05/sq mi)
- Time zone: UTC+1 (CET)
  - Summer (DST): UTC+2 (CEST)
- Postal codes: 438 01, 439 88
- Website: www.blsany.cz

Blšany (Czech pronunciation: [ˈbl̩ʃanɪ]; German: Flöhau) is a town in Louny District in the Ústí nad Labem Region of the Czech Republic. It has about 1,000 inhabitants.

== Administrative division ==
Blšany consists of six municipal parts (in brackets population according to the 2021 census):

- Blšany (407)
- Liběšovice (149)
- Malá Černoc (119)
- Siřem (68)
- Soběchleby (151)
- Stachov (35)

== Etymology ==
The name was derived either from the word blcha (in modern Czech blecha), i.e. 'flea', or from the surname Blcha (or Blecha), meaning "the village of Blcha's people".

== Geography ==
Blšany is located about 28 kilometres (17 mi) southwest of Louny, 63 km (39 mi) southwest of Ústí nad Labem, and 62 km (39 mi) west of Prague. The northern part of the municipal territory lies in the Most Basin. The southern part lies in the Rakovník Uplands and includes the highest point of Blšany, the hill Hůrka at 437 metres (1,434 ft) above sea level. The Blšanka River flows through the town.

== History ==
The first written mention of Blšany is from 1238, when the village was a property of the Waldsassen Abbey. Between 1238 and 1252, a small town was founded on the site of the village.

From 1938 to 1945, Blšany was annexed by Nazi Germany and administered as part of the Reichsgau Sudetenland.

== Demographics ==
Historical population

Year	Pop.	±%
1869	3,021	—
1880	3,251	+7.6%
1890	3,214	−1.1%
1900	3,472	+8.0%
1910	3,457	−0.4%

Year	Pop.	±%
1921	3,288	−4.9%
1930	3,434	+4.4%
1950	1,410	−58.9%
1961	1,559	+10.6%
1970	1,488	−4.6%

Year	Pop.	±%
1980	1,207	−18.9%
1991	969	−19.7%
2001	926	−4.4%
2011	935	+1.0%
2021	929	−0.6%

Source: Censuses

== Economy ==
Blšany is located in an area known for growing hops.

== Transport ==
The I/27 road, which connects Plzeň with Most, runs through the town.

== Sport ==
Blšany was known nationwide for its football club FK Chmel Blšany, which played in the Czech First League between 1998 and 2006. However, the club was disbanded in 2016. Blšany is the smallest town where the Czech First League was played.

== Sights ==
The main landmark of Blšany is the Church of Saint Michael. It was built in the Baroque style in 1716–1717 and rebuilt in 1825.

== Notable people ==
Franz Kafka spent several months in convalescence in the village of Siřem after tuberculosis was diagnosed.
