= Dalio Memić =

Bosnian footballer (born 1990)

Personal information
- Date of birth: March 21, 1990 (age 36)
- Place of birth: Derventa, SFR Yugoslavia
- Height: 1.85 m (6 ft 1 in)
- Position: Centre-back

Youth career
- Waldhof Mannheim
- TSG 1899 Hoffenheim

Senior career*
Years	Team	Apps	(Gls)
2008–2009	Waldhof Mannheim	2	(0)
2009–2010	1. FC Nürnberg II		
2010	Kecskemét	2	(0)
2010	Velež Mostar	3	(0)
2012	Waldhof Mannheim	1	(0)

International career
2009–?	Bosnia and Herzegovina U21	1	(0)
- * Club domestic league appearances and goals

Dalio Memić (born March 21, 1990) is a Bosnian former professional footballer who played as a centre-back.
