= Martin Pazdera =

Czech footballer

Personal information
- Date of birth: 26 September 1976 (age 50)
- Place of birth: Czech Republic
- Position: Midfielder

Senior career*
Years	Team	Apps	(Gls)
1999–2003	Chmel Blsany	61	(1)
- * Club domestic league appearances and goals

Martin Pazdera (born 26 September 1976) is a retired Czech midfielder.
