= Andreas Ioannides (footballer) =

Cypriot footballer (born 1975)

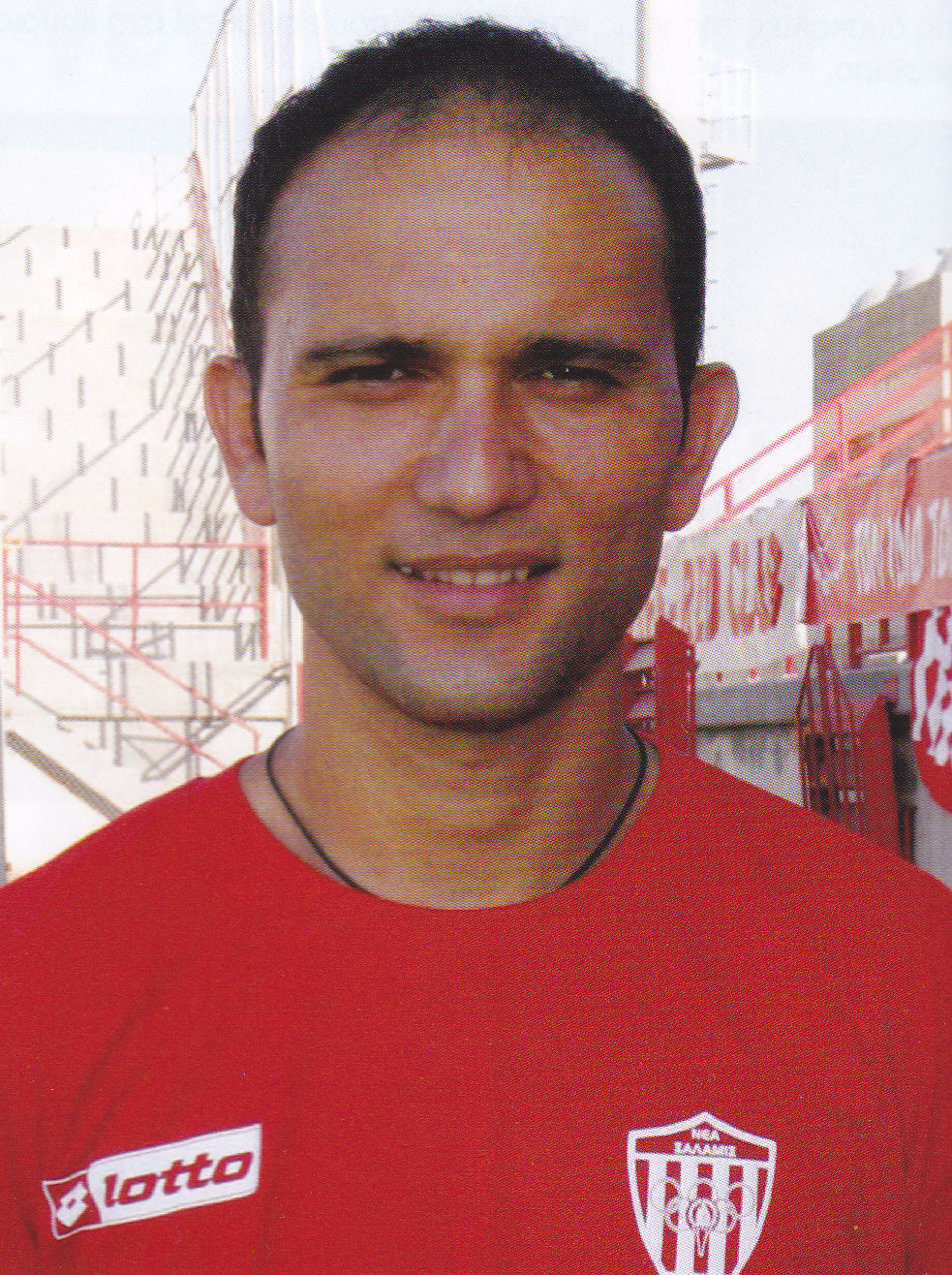

Personal information
- Date of birth: November 29, 1975 (age 50)
- Place of birth: Nicosia, Cyprus
- Height: 1.75 m (5 ft 9 in)
- Position: Midfielder

Senior career*
Years	Team	Apps	(Gls)
1998–2009	Nea Salamis Famagusta FC	140	(5)

International career
	Cyprus	0	(0)
- * Club domestic league appearances and goals

Andreas Ioannides (Greek: Ανδρέας Ιωαννίδης; born November 29, 1975) is a retired Cypriot football midfielder who last played for Nea Salamina. He can play as defender.
