= Jiří Sýkora (footballer) =

Czech footballer

Personal information
- Date of birth: 3 May 1977 (age 49)
- Place of birth: Czech Republic
- Position: Midfielder

Senior career*
Years	Team	Apps	(Gls)
1998–2005	Chmel Blsany	149	(4)
- * Club domestic league appearances and goals

Jiří Sýkora (born 3 May 1977) is a retired Czech midfielder. He played in the Czech First League for seven years with Chmel Blsany, making 149 appearances and scoring 4 goals for the club between 1998 and 2005. He retired from professional football at the age of 28 in 2005, in order to focus on a career as a lawyer.
