= Václav Drobný =

Czech footballer

Personal information
- Full name: Václav Drobný
- Date of birth: 9 September 1980
- Place of birth: Mělník, Czechoslovakia
- Date of death: 28 December 2012 (aged 32)
- Place of death: Hradec Králové, Czech Republic
- Height: 6 ft 3 in (1.91 m)
- Position: Centre back

Youth career
- Aero Odolena Voda
- Sparta Prague

Senior career*
Years	Team	Apps	(Gls)
1998–2002	Chmel Blšany	78	(1)
2002–2005	Strasbourg	42	(0)
2004–2005	→ Aston Villa (loan)	0	(0)
2005–2007	Sparta Prague	16	(0)
2005–2006	→ Jablonec 97 (loan)	15	(0)
2007–2008	FC Augsburg	15	(1)
2008–2009	Spartak Trnava	15	(1)
2010–2011	Bohemians Praha	8	(0)
Total		189	(3)

International career
2000–2002	Czech Republic U21	17	(1)
2004	Czech Republic	2	(0)
Medal record
Men's football
Representing Czech Republic
UEFA European Under-21 Championship
Winner	2002 Switzerland
- * Club domestic league appearances and goals

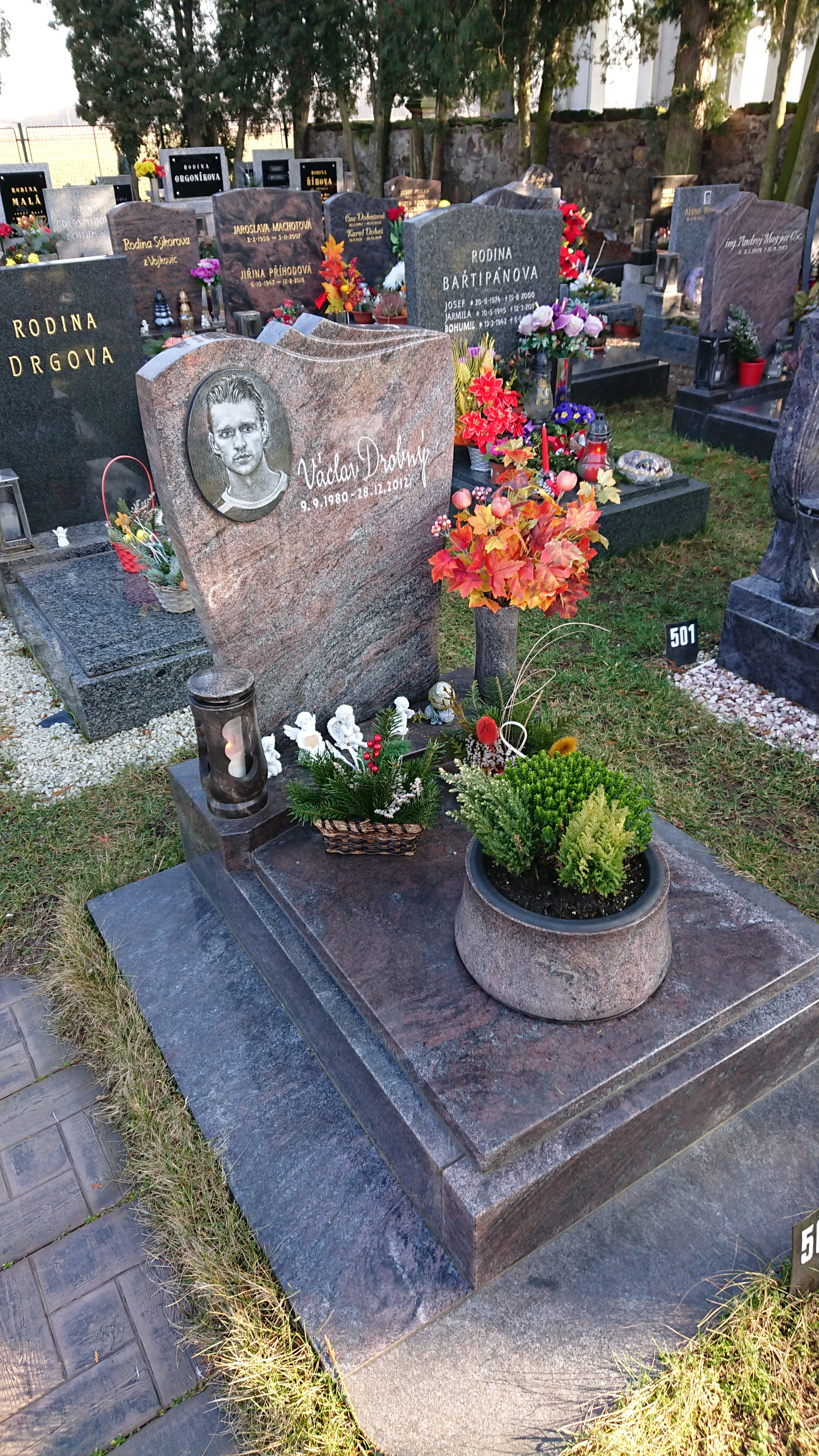
Grave of Václav Drobný

Václav Drobný (9 September 1980 – 28 December 2012) was a Czech footballer who notably played for Sparta Prague having spent time in their youth team as well as spells at Czech, Slovak, French and German sides. Drobný played twice for the Czech Republic and was most known in England for his short stint on loan at Aston Villa.

== Career ==
=== Club career ===
Drobný played for FK Jablonec nad Nisou 97 (on loan from Sparta) during the first half of the 2005–06 season, RC Strasbourg, Chmel Blšany and Sparta Prague. He also spent the 2004–05 season on loan at English team Aston Villa, in the Premier League. The move was not a success for the defender however, who left having failed to make a single first team appearance for the claret and blue.

Drobný left Strasbourg in 2005 to join Sparta Prague, before having spells at Jablonec 97, Augsburg and FC Spartak Trnava. He was released by the latter in 2009. However, the following year Drobný signed for Bohemians Praha. The defender made his debut for the club in a 3–2 victory away at Slovan Liberec on 20 March 2010. He played eighty minutes for his new club before being replaced by Martin Horacek.

=== International career ===
Drobný was part of the Czech side which won the UEFA U-21 Championships in 2002, and debuted for the senior team against Japan – though he failed to secure a spot in Euro 2004. The defender won two international caps.

== Death ==
Drobný died while bobsleighing at the ski resort Špindlerův Mlýn. He skidded off-piste and crashed into a tree.
