= Almir Memić (footballer, born 1975) =

Bosnian retired football player (born 1975)

Personal information
- Full name: Almir Memić
- Date of birth: 16 October 1975 (age 51)
- Place of birth: Sarajevo, SFR Yugoslavia
- Height: 1.82 m (5 ft 11 1/2 in)
- Position: Striker

Senior career*
Years	Team	Apps	(Gls)
1999–2000	Željezničar	22	(16)
2000–2004	LASK Linz	39	(3)
2004	Željezničar	0	(0)
2005–2007	SV Gmunden	50+	(5+)
2007–2011	SV GW Micheldorf	103	(4)
2011–2012	Union Sipbachzell	23	(5)
2012–2013	SV Krenglbach	23	(0)

International career^{‡}
1999–2000	Bosnia and Herzegovina	2	(0)

Managerial career
- 2013–2014: SV Krenglbach
- 2014–2018: SV GW Micheldorf
- 2018–2019: SV Gmunden
- 2019–2020: SV Pichl
- * Club domestic league appearances and goals as of 5 April 2021 ‡ National team caps and goals as of 5 April 2021

Almir Memić (born 16 October 1975 in Sarajevo, SR Bosnia-Herzegovina, SFR Yugoslavia) is a Bosnian retired football player. He spent a large part of his career in Austria and was part of the Bosnia and Herzegovina national team.

== Playing career ==
=== Club ===
Memić played for Bosnian giants Željezničar and moved abroad to join Austrian Bundesliga side LASK Linz in 2000. He later played for Austrian lower league sides.

=== International ===
He made his debut for Bosnia and Herzegovina in an August 1999 friendly match away against Liechtenstein and has earned a total of 2 caps, scoring no goals. His second and final international was a January 2000 friendly against Qatar.

== Managerial career ==
After hanging up his boots, Memić became a manager at SV Krenglbach and managed other Austrian amateur sides.
