= Slovenia national football team results (1992–2019) =

The Slovenia national football team represents Slovenia in association football and is controlled by the Football Association of Slovenia, the governing body for football in Slovenia. It competes as a member of the Union of European Football Associations (UEFA), the governing body for football across Europe. Slovenia joined UEFA and the International Federation of Association Football (FIFA) in 1992, a year after the country gained independence from the Socialist Federal Republic of Yugoslavia.

Slovenia's first official match—a 1–1 draw against Estonia—took place on 3 June 1992. Their first victory came in their third match, a 2–0 home win against the same opponents. They entered their first major international competition in 1994: the qualifying rounds for the 1996 UEFA European Football Championship. The team won their first competitive match on 29 March 1995 when they defeated Estonia 3–0 in the 1996 European Championship qualifiers. Slovenia made its first appearance in the qualifying rounds of the FIFA World Cup during the 1998 edition.

The team's largest victory came on 8 February 1999 when they defeated Oman by seven goals to nil in the Oman International Tournament. Their worst loss is a 5–0 against France in 2002. Boštjan Cesar holds the appearance record for Slovenia, having been capped 101 times between 2003 and 2018. The goalscoring record is held by Zlatko Zahovič, who scored 35 times in 80 matches. As of November 2026, Slovenia are ranked 49th in the FIFA World Rankings. Its highest-ever ranking of 15th was achieved in October and November 2010.

== Results ==
Key

Win Draw Loss

=== 1992 ===
3 June Friendly	Estonia	1–1	Slovenia	Tallinn, Estonia
	Pushtov 7'	Report	Benedejčič 73'	Stadium: Kadriorg Stadium; Attendance: 3,500; Referee: Eero Aho (Finland)

18 November Friendly	Cyprus	1–1	Slovenia	Larnaca, Cyprus
	Savvidis 50'	Report	Miloševič 55'	Stadium: Antonis Papadopoulos Stadium; Attendance: 500; Referee: Loizos Loizou (Cyprus)

=== 1993 ===
7 April Friendly	Slovenia	2–0	Estonia	Ljubljana, Slovenia
	Zulič 13'; Udovič 14'	Report		Stadium: ŽŠD Ljubljana Stadium; Attendance: 2,000; Referee: Alfred Wieser (Austria)

13 October Friendly	Slovenia	1–4	Macedonia	Kranj, Slovenia
	Pate 40'	Report	Boškovski 3'; Pančev 37' (pen.); Janevski 48' (pen.); Kanatlarovski 51'	Stadium: Stanko Mlakar Stadium; Attendance: 3,000; Referee: Dragutin Poljak (Croatia)

=== 1994 ===
8 February Rothmans International Tournament	Georgia	0–1	Slovenia	Attard, Malta
		Report	Gliha 80'	Stadium: Ta' Qali National Stadium; Attendance: 1,000; Referee: Lawrence Sammut (Malta)

10 February Rothmans International Tournament	Tunisia	2–2	Slovenia	Attard, Malta
	Hamrouni 40'; Souissi 66'	Report	Jermaniš 35'; Binkovski 51'	Stadium: Ta' Qali National Stadium; Attendance: 2,000; Referee: Alfred Micaleff (Malta)

12 February Rothmans International Tournament	Malta	0–1	Slovenia	Attard, Malta
		Report	Gliha 54'	Stadium: Ta' Qali National Stadium; Attendance: 3,000; Referee: Mohamed Bellagha (Tunisia)

23 March Friendly	Macedonia	2–0	Slovenia	Skopje, Macedonia
	Serafimovski 2'; Boškovski 20'	Report		Stadium: Gradski Stadion; Attendance: 20,000; Referee: Stefan Ormandzhiev (Bulgaria)

6 April Friendly	Hungary	0–1	Slovenia	Szombathely, Hungary
		Report	Katanec 27'	Stadium: Rohonci út Attendance: 4,000; Referee: Robert Sedlacek (Austria)

27 April Friendly	Slovenia	3–0	Cyprus	Maribor, Slovenia
	Pate 44', 82'; Udovič 75'	Report		Stadium: Ljudski vrt Attendance: 3,000; Referee: Molnár László (Hungary)

1 June Friendly	Romania	0–0	Slovenia	Bucharest, Romania
		Report		Stadium: Stadionul Steaua; Attendance: 12,000; Referee: Piotr Werner (Poland)

7 September UEFA Euro 1996 qualifying	Slovenia	1–1	Italy	Maribor, Slovenia
	Udovič 14'	Report	Costacurta 16'	Stadium: Ljudski vrt Attendance: 5,200; Referee: Bernd Heynemann (Germany)

12 October UEFA Euro 1996 qualifying	Ukraine	0–0	Slovenia	Kyiv, Ukraine
		Report		Stadium: Republican Stadium; Attendance: 8,500; Referee: Atanas Uzunov (Bulgaria)

16 November UEFA Euro 1996 qualifying	Slovenia	1–2	Lithuania	Maribor, Slovenia
	Zahovič 55'	Report	Sukristov 64'; Žuta 87'	Stadium: Ljudski vrt Attendance: 4,000; Referee: Karol Ihring (Slovakia)

=== 1995 ===
29 March UEFA Euro 1996 qualifying	Slovenia	3–0	Estonia	Maribor, Slovenia
	Zahovič 40'; Gliha 52'; Kokol 90'	Report		Stadium: Ljudski vrt Attendance: 1,850; Referee: José João Mendes Pratas (Portugal)

26 April UEFA Euro 1996 qualifying	Croatia	2–0	Slovenia	Zagreb, Croatia
	Prosinečki 15'; Šuker 85'	Report		Stadium: Stadion Maksimir; Attendance: 14,059; Referee: Oğuz Sarvan (Turkey)

7 June UEFA Euro 1996 qualifying	Lithuania	2–1	Slovenia	Vilnius, Lithuania
	Stonkus 47'; Šuika 70'	Report	Gliha 83'	Stadium: Žalgirio Stadionas; Attendance: 2,600; Referee: László Vágner (Hungary)

11 June UEFA Euro 1996 qualifying	Estonia	1–3	Slovenia	Tallinn, Estonia
	Reim 26'	Report	Novak 38', 69'; Zahovič 79'	Stadium: Kadriorg Stadium; Attendance: 1,100; Referee: Paul Durkin (England)

6 September UEFA Euro 1996 qualifying	Italy	1–0	Slovenia	Udine, Italy
	Ravanelli 13'	Report		Stadium: Stadio Friuli; Attendance: 18,532; Referee: Ladislav Gádoši (Slovakia)

11 October UEFA Euro 1996 qualifying	Slovenia	3–2	Ukraine	Ljubljana, Slovenia
	Udovič 50', 90'; Zahovič 73'	Report	Skrypnyk 23'; Huseynov 44'	Stadium: Bežigrad Stadium; Attendance: 2,750; Referee: Alain Hamer (Luxembourg)

15 November UEFA Euro 1996 qualifying	Slovenia	1–2	Croatia	Ljubljana, Slovenia
	Gliha 35'	Report	Šuker 40' (pen.); Jurčević 54'	Stadium: Bežigrad Stadium; Attendance: 6,800; Referee: Guy Goethals (Belgium)

6 December Friendly	Mexico	1–2	Slovenia	Hermosillo, Mexico
	Hernández 4'	Report	Čeh 8'; Šiljak 20'	Stadium: Estadio Héroe de Nacozari; Attendance: 20,000; Referee: Miguel Angel Salas (Mexico)

=== 1996 ===
7 February Rothmans International Tournament	Iceland	1–7	Slovenia	Attard, Malta
	Þórðarson 40'	Report	Udovič 42', 48', 57', 69', 74'; Florjančič 79'; Šiljak 83'	Stadium: Ta' Qali National Stadium; Attendance: 450; Referee: Lawrence Sammut (Malta)

9 February Rothmans International Tournament	Malta	0–0	Slovenia	Attard, Malta
		Report		Stadium: Ta' Qali National Stadium; Attendance: 2,500; Referee: Guðmundur Maríasson (Iceland)

11 February Rothmans International Tournament	Russia	3–1	Slovenia	Attard, Malta
	Simutenkov 13', 73'; Alenichev 17'	Report	Gliha 80' (pen.)	Stadium: Ta' Qali National Stadium; Attendance: 4,000; Referee: Charles Agius (Malta)

27 March Friendly	Poland	0–0	Slovenia	Łódź, Poland
		Report		Stadium: Stadion Widzewa; Attendance: 8,000; Referee: Vladimír Hriňák (Slovakia)

24 April 1998 FIFA World Cup qualification	Greece	2–0	Slovenia	Athens, Greece
	Lima-Batista 56'; Nikolaidis 66'	Report		Stadium: Olympic Stadium; Attendance: 5,053; Referee: Rune Pedersen (Norway)

21 May Friendly	Slovenia	2–2	United Arab Emirates	Ljubljana, Slovenia
	Šiljak 57'; Karić 60'	Report	Bakheet 48'; Saad Mubarak 50'	Stadium: Bežigrad Stadium; Attendance: 2,500; Referee: Mateo Beusan (Croatia)

1 September 1998 FIFA World Cup qualification	Slovenia	0–2	Denmark	Ljubljana, Slovenia
		Report	Nielsen 78'; Schjønberg 89'	Stadium: Bežigrad Stadium; Attendance: 5,000; Referee: Urs Meier (Switzerland)

10 November 1998 FIFA World Cup qualification	Slovenia	1–2	Bosnia and Herzegovina	Ljubljana, Slovenia
	Zahovič 41' (pen.)	Report	Bolić 5'; Kodro 33'	Stadium: Bežigrad Stadium; Attendance: 3,200; Referee: Charles Agius (Malta)

=== 1997 ===
18 March Friendly	Austria	0–2	Slovenia	Linz, Austria
		Report	Gliha 74'; Šiljak 84'	Stadium: Linzer Stadion; Attendance: 14,500; Referee: Vladimír Hriňák (Slovakia)

2 April 1998 FIFA World Cup qualification	Croatia	3–3	Slovenia	Split, Croatia
	Prosinečki 33'; Boban 43', 60'	Report	Gliha 45', 65', 67'	Stadium: Stadion Poljud; Attendance: 15,136; Referee: Paul Durkin (England)

30 April 1998 FIFA World Cup qualification	Denmark	4–0	Slovenia	Copenhagen, Denmark
	A. Nielsen 4', 56'; Pedersen 28'; Laudrup 52' (pen.)	Report		Stadium: Parken Stadium; Attendance: 41,278; Referee: Hellmut Krug (Germany)

6 September 1998 FIFA World Cup qualification	Slovenia	0–3	Greece	Ljubljana, Slovenia
		Report	Alexandris 54'; Konstantinidis 89'; Machlas 90'	Stadium: Bežigrad Stadium; Attendance: 4,689; Referee: Karol Ihring (Slovakia)

10 September 1998 FIFA World Cup qualification	Bosnia and Herzegovina	1–0	Slovenia	Sarajevo, Bosnia and Herzegovina
	Bolić 22'	Report		Stadium: City Stadium Koševo; Attendance: 18,000; Referee: Taras Bezubyak (Russia)

11 October 1998 FIFA World Cup qualification	Slovenia	1–3	Croatia	Ljubljana, Slovenia
	Zahovič 72'	Report	Šuker 11'; Soldo 40'; Bokšić 53'	Stadium: Bežigrad Stadium; Attendance: 6,000; Referee: Amand Ancion (Belgium)

=== 1998 ===
5 February Cyprus International Tournament	Iceland	2–3	Slovenia	Limassol, Cyprus
	Daðason 39'; Guðjónsson 87'	Report	Zahovič 36', 65' (pen.); Poljšak 67'	Stadium: Tsirion Stadium; Attendance: 200; Referee: Kostas Kapitanis (Cyprus)

6 February Cyprus International Tournament	Slovakia	1–1	Slovenia	Limassol, Cyprus
	Moravčík 75'	Report	Zahovič 72'	Stadium: Tsirion Stadium; Attendance: 300; Referee: Giannakis Kiprianidis (Cyprus)

9 February Cyprus International Tournament	Cyprus	1–0	Slovenia	Limassol, Cyprus
	Kaiafas 10'	Report		Stadium: Tsirion Stadium; Attendance: 400; Referee: Andreas Georgiou (Cyprus)

25 March Friendly	Poland	2–0	Slovenia	Warsaw, Poland
	Kowalczyk 37'; Iwan 55'	Report		Stadium: Polish Army Stadium; Attendance: 6,000; Referee: Vasyl Melnychuk (Ukraine)

22 April Friendly	Slovenia	1–3	Czech Republic	Murska Sobota, Slovenia
	Bulajič 23'	Report	Šmicer 26'; Lukeš 58', 60'	Stadium: Fazanerija City Stadium; Attendance: 2,000; Referee: Robert Sedlacek (Austria)

19 August Friendly	Hungary	2–1	Slovenia	Zalaegerszeg, Hungary
	Dombi 69'; Sebők 85' (pen.)	Report	Ačimovič 90+1'	Stadium: ZTE Arena; Attendance: 12,000; Referee: Manfred Schüttengruber (Austria)

6 September UEFA Euro 2000 qualifying	Greece	2–2	Slovenia	Marousi, Greece
	Machlas 55' (pen.); Frantzeskos 58'	Report	Zahovič 18', 72'	Stadium: Olympic Stadium; Attendance: 28,908; Referee: Alfredo Trentalange (Italy)

10 October UEFA Euro 2000 qualifying	Slovenia	1–2	Norway	Ljubljana, Slovenia
	Zahovič 24'	Report	Flo 45'; Rekdal 80'	Stadium: Bežigrad Stadium; Attendance: 6,200; Referee: Andreas Schluchter (Switzerland)

14 October UEFA Euro 2000 qualifying	Slovenia	1–0	Latvia	Maribor, Slovenia
	Udovič 86'	Report		Stadium: Ljudski vrt Attendance: 3,292; Referee: Karen Nalbandyan (Armenia)

=== 1999 ===
6 February Oman International Tournament	Slovenia	0–2	Switzerland	Muscat, Oman
		Report	Hodel 8'; Comisetti 17'	Stadium: Sultan Qaboos Sports Complex; Attendance: 220; Referee: Baboud Abdullah (Oman)

8 February Oman International Tournament	Oman	0–7	Slovenia	Muscat, Oman
		Report	Osterc 8', 72', 82', 89'; Gajser 26'; Zahovič 87'; Udovič 90'	Stadium: Sultan Qaboos Sports Complex; Attendance: 3,000; Referee: Abdulhameed Ebrahim (Bahrain)

27 March UEFA Euro 2000 qualifying	Georgia	1–1	Slovenia	Tbilisi, Georgia
	Dzhanashia 43'	Report	Knavs 52'	Stadium: Boris Paichadze National Stadium; Attendance: 20,000; Referee: Alain Hamer (Luxembourg)

28 April Friendly	Slovenia	1–1	Finland	Ljubljana, Slovenia
	Zahovič 62' (pen.)	Report	Paatelainen 22' (pen.)	Stadium: ŽŠD Ljubljana Stadium; Attendance: 2,000; Referee: Fiorenzo Treossi (Italy)

5 June UEFA Euro 2000 qualifying	Latvia	1–2	Slovenia	Riga, Latvia
	Pahars 17'	Report	Zahovič 26', 42' (pen.)	Stadium: Daugava Stadium; Attendance: 2,800; Referee: Juan Manuel Brito Arceo (Spain)

9 June UEFA Euro 2000 qualifying	Albania	0–1	Slovenia	Tirana, Albania
		Report	Zahovič 25' (pen.)	Stadium: Qemal Stafa Stadium; Attendance: 8,000; Referee: Adrian Stoica (Romania)

18 August UEFA Euro 2000 qualifying	Slovenia	2–0	Albania	Ljubljana, Slovenia
	Zahovič 49'; Osterc 80'	Report		Stadium: Bežigrad Stadium; Attendance: 6,900; Referee: Joaquim Paulo Paraty da Silva (Portugal)

4 September UEFA Euro 2000 qualifying	Slovenia	2–1	Georgia	Ljubljana, Slovenia
	Ačimovič 48'; Zahovič 80'	Report	S. Arveladze 55'	Stadium: Bežigrad Stadium; Attendance: 7,000; Referee: Jan Wegereef (Netherlands)

8 September UEFA Euro 2000 qualifying	Norway	4–0	Slovenia	Oslo, Norway
	Istenič 16' (o.g.); Iversen 18'; Solskjær 29'; Leonhardsen 68'	Report		Stadium: Ullevaal Stadion; Attendance: 24,288; Referee: Gilles Veissière (France)

9 October UEFA Euro 2000 qualifying	Slovenia	0–3	Greece	Maribor, Slovenia
		Report	Tsiartas 39'; Georgiadis 42'; Nikolaidis 72'	Stadium: Ljudski vrt Attendance: 2,500; Referee: Gamal Al-Ghandour (Egypt)

13 November UEFA Euro 2000 qualifying play-offs	Slovenia	2–1	Ukraine	Ljubljana, Slovenia
	Zahovič 53'; Ačimovič 84'	Report	Shevchenko 33'	Stadium: Bežigrad Stadium; Attendance: 9,000; Referee: Urs Meier (Switzerland)

17 November UEFA Euro 2000 qualifying play-offs	Ukraine	1–1 (2–3 agg.)	Slovenia	Kyiv, Ukraine
	Rebrov 68' (pen.)	Report	Pavlin 74'	Stadium: Olimpiyskiy National Sports Complex; Attendance: 45,000; Referee: Bernd Heynemann (Germany)

=== 2000 ===
19 February Oman International Tournament	United Arab Emirates	1–1	Slovenia	Muscat, Oman
	Salem Ali 87'	Report	Udovič 73'	Stadium: Sultan Qaboos Sports Complex; Attendance: 500; Referee: Yousef Fadhil (Oman)

23 February Oman International Tournament	Oman	0–4	Slovenia	Muscat, Oman
		Report	Pavlin 15'; Zahovič 32'; Udovič 57'; Ačimovič 67' (pen.)	Stadium: Sultan Qaboos Sports Complex; Attendance: 300; Referee: Abdullah Said (United Arab Emirates)

26 April Friendly	France	3–2	Slovenia	Saint-Denis, France
	Trezeguet 62', 90+5'; Blanc 77'	Report	Milinovič 3'; Udovič 10'	Stadium: Stade de France; Attendance: 59,652; Referee: Abderrahim El Arjoun (Morocco)

3 June Friendly	Slovenia	2–0	Saudi Arabia	Ljubljana, Slovenia
	Zahovič 16'; Ačimovič 46'	Report		Stadium: Bežigrad Stadium; Attendance: 9,000; Referee: Edo Trivković (Croatia)

13 June UEFA Euro 2000 Group C	Slovenia	3–3	FR Yugoslavia	Charleroi, Belgium
	Zahovič 23', 57'; Pavlin 52'	Report	Milošević 67', 73'; Drulović 70'	Stadium: Stade du Pays de Charleroi; Attendance: 18,500; Referee: Vítor Melo Pereira (Portugal)

18 June UEFA Euro 2000 Group C	Slovenia	1–2	Spain	Amsterdam, Netherlands
	Zahovič 59'	Report	Raúl 4'; Etxeberria 60'	Stadium: Amsterdam Arena; Attendance: 40,000; Referee: Markus Merk (Germany)

21 June UEFA Euro 2000 Group C	Norway	0–0	Slovenia	Arnhem, Netherlands
		Report		Stadium: GelreDome; Attendance: 22,000; Referee: Graham Poll (England)

16 August Friendly	Czech Republic	0–1	Slovenia	Ostrava, Czech Republic
		Report	Pavlin 59'	Stadium: Bazaly; Attendance: 4,828; Referee: Attila Hanacsek (Hungary)

3 September 2002 FIFA World Cup qualification	Faroe Islands	2–2	Slovenia	Toftir, Faroe Islands
	Arge 87'; Ø. Hansen 90'	Report	Udovič 25'; Osterc 85'	Stadium: Svangaskarð; Attendance: 3,200; Referee: Mikko Vuorela (Finland)

7 October 2002 FIFA World Cup qualification	Luxembourg	1–2	Slovenia	Luxembourg City, Luxembourg
	Strasser 46'	Report	Zahovič 35'; Milinovič 37'	Stadium: Stade Josy Barthel; Attendance: 1,788; Referee: Michal Beneš (Czech Republic)

11 October 2002 FIFA World Cup qualification	Slovenia	2–2	Switzerland	Ljubljana, Slovenia
	Šiljak 44'; Ačimovič 79'	Report	Türkyilmaz 20', 66'	Stadium: Bežigrad Stadium; Attendance: 6,650; Referee: Paul Durkin (England)

=== 2001 ===
28 February Friendly	Slovenia	0–2	Uruguay	Koper, Slovenia
		Report	Olivera 23'; Zalayeta 87'	Stadium: Bonifika Stadium; Attendance: 4,000; Referee: Anton Stredák (Slovakia)

24 March 2002 FIFA World Cup qualification	Russia	1–1	Slovenia	Moscow, Russia
	Khokhlov 9'	Report	Knavs 21'	Stadium: Luzhniki Stadium; Attendance: 33,000; Referee: Hugh Dallas (Scotland)

28 March 2002 FIFA World Cup qualification	Slovenia	1–1	FR Yugoslavia	Ljubljana, Slovenia
	Zahovič 90+4'	Report	Milošević 32'	Stadium: Bežigrad Stadium; Attendance: 9,000; Referee: Dick Jol (Netherlands)

25 April Friendly	Denmark	3–0	Slovenia	Copenhagen, Denmark
	Grønkjær 61'; Tomasson 69' (pen.); Sand 82'	Report		Stadium: Parken Stadium; Attendance: 32,526; Referee: Petteri Kari (Finland)

2 June 2002 FIFA World Cup qualification	Slovenia	2–0	Luxembourg	Ljubljana, Slovenia
	Zahovič 34', 65' (pen.)	Report		Stadium: Bežigrad Stadium; Attendance: 4,500; Referee: Bernhard Brugger (Austria)

6 June 2002 FIFA World Cup qualification	Switzerland	0–1	Slovenia	Basel, Switzerland
		Report	Cimirotič 82'	Stadium: St. Jakob-Park; Attendance: 26,000; Referee: Jacek Granat (Poland)

15 August Friendly	Slovenia	2–2	Romania	Ljubljana, Slovenia
	Ačimovič 55'; Zahovič 75'	Report	Niculae 14'; Moldovan 66'	Stadium: Bežigrad Stadium; Attendance: 6,000; Referee: Sead Kulović (Bosnia and Herzegovina)

1 September 2002 FIFA World Cup qualification	Slovenia	2–1	Russia	Ljubljana, Slovenia
	Osterc 62'; Ačimovič 90' (pen.)	Report	Titov 73'	Stadium: Bežigrad Stadium; Attendance: 9,000; Referee: Graham Poll (England)

5 September 2002 FIFA World Cup qualification	FR Yugoslavia	1–1	Slovenia	Belgrade, Yugoslavia
	Đorđević 51'	Report	Milinovič 10'	Stadium: Partizan Stadium; Attendance: 22,000; Referee: Antonio Jesús López Nieto (Spain)

6 October 2002 FIFA World Cup qualification	Slovenia	3–0	Faroe Islands	Ljubljana, Slovenia
	N. Čeh 13', 31'; Tiganj 82'	Report		Stadium: Bežigrad Stadium; Attendance: 8,500; Referee: Giorgos Kasnaferis (Greece)

10 November 2002 FIFA World Cup qual. play-offs	Slovenia	2–1	Romania	Ljubljana, Slovenia
	Ačimovič 41'; Osterc 68'	Report	Niculae 26'	Stadium: Bežigrad Stadium; Attendance: 9,000; Referee: Kim Milton Nielsen (Denmark)

14 November 2002 FIFA World Cup qual. play-offs	Romania	1–1 (2–3 agg.)	Slovenia	Bucharest, Romania
	Contra 65'	Report	Rudonja 55'	Stadium: Stadionul Steaua; Attendance: 30,000; Referee: Hellmut Krug (Germany)

=== 2002 ===
12 February Lunar New Year Cup semi-final	Honduras	5–1	Slovenia	Hong Kong
	S. Martínez 39', 58', 69', 72'; C. Martínez 90'	Report	Zahovič 53' (pen.)	Stadium: Hong Kong Stadium; Attendance: 25,000; Referee: Toru Kamikawa (Japan)

15 February Lunar New Year Cup third place match	China	0–0 (a.e.t.) (3–4 p)	Slovenia	Hong Kong
		Report		Stadium: Hong Kong Stadium; Attendance: 30,000; Referee: Kim Tae-young (South Korea)

27 March Friendly	Croatia	0–0	Slovenia	Zagreb, Croatia
		Report		Stadium: Stadion Maksimir; Attendance: 8,661; Referee: Zsolt Szabó (Hungary)

17 April Friendly	Slovenia	1–0	Tunisia	Ljubljana, Slovenia
	Pavlin 23'	Report		Stadium: Bežigrad Stadium; Attendance: 5,500; Referee: Edo Trivković (Croatia)

17 May Friendly	Slovenia	2–0	Ghana	Ljubljana, Slovenia
	Zahovič 25'; Novak 45'	Report		Stadium: Bežigrad Stadium; Attendance: 7,000; Referee: Michal Beneš (Czech Republic)

2 June 2002 FIFA World Cup Group B	Slovenia	1–3	Spain	Gwangju, South Korea
	Cimirotič 82'	Report	Raúl 44'; Valerón 74'; Hierro 87' (pen.)	Stadium: Gwangju World Cup Stadium; Attendance: 28,588; Referee: Mohamed Guezzaz (Morocco)

8 June 2002 FIFA World Cup Group B	Slovenia	0–1	South Africa	Daegu, South Korea
		Report	Nomvethe 4'	Stadium: Daegu World Cup Stadium; Attendance: 47,226; Referee: Ángel Sánchez (Argentina)

12 June 2002 FIFA World Cup Group B	Paraguay	3–1	Slovenia	Seogwipo, South Korea
	Cuevas 65', 84'; Campos 73'	Report	Ačimovič 45+1'	Stadium: Jeju World Cup Stadium; Attendance: 30,176; Referee: Felipe Ramos (Mexico)

21 August Friendly	Italy	0–1	Slovenia	Trieste, Italy
		Report	Cimirotič 32'	Stadium: Stadio Nereo Rocco; Attendance: 11,080; Referee: Bernhard Brugger (Austria)

7 September UEFA Euro 2004 qualifying	Slovenia	3–0	Malta	Ljubljana, Slovenia
	Debono 37' (o.g.); Šiljak 61'; Cimirotič 90'	Report		Stadium: Bežigrad Stadium; Attendance: 7,000; Referee: Giorgos Borovilos (Greece)

12 October UEFA Euro 2004 qualifying	France	5–0	Slovenia	Saint-Denis, France
	Vieira 10'; Marlet 35', 64'; Wiltord 79'; Govou 86'	Report		Stadium: Stade de France; Attendance: 77,619; Referee: Kim Milton Nielsen (Denmark)

=== 2003 ===
12 February Friendly	Slovenia	1–5	Switzerland	Nova Gorica, Slovenia
	Rakovič 72'	Report	Yakin 3'; Haas 29'; Frei 36', 78'; Cabanas 49'	Stadium: Nova Gorica Sports Park; Attendance: 3,000; Referee: Attila Ábrahám (Hungary)

2 April UEFA Euro 2004 qualifying	Slovenia	4–1	Cyprus	Ljubljana, Slovenia
	Šiljak 5', 14'; Zahovič 39' (pen.); Čeh 43'	Report	Konstantinou 10'	Stadium: Bežigrad Stadium; Attendance: 7,000; Referee: Paulo Manuel Gomes Costa (Portugal)

30 April UEFA Euro 2004 qualifying	Malta	1–3	Slovenia	Attard, Malta
	Mifsud 90'	Report	Zahovič 15'; Šiljak 36', 57'	Stadium: Ta' Qali National Stadium; Attendance: 2,368; Referee: Attila Hanacsek (Hungary)

7 June UEFA Euro 2004 qualifying	Israel	0–0	Slovenia	Antalya, Turkey
		Report		Stadium: İzmir Atatürk Stadium; Attendance: 1,800; Referee: Massimo Busacca (Switzerland)

20 August Friendly	Slovenia	2–1	Hungary	Murska Sobota, Slovenia
	Šukalo 3'; Cimirotič 76'	Report	Fehér 90+3'	Stadium: Fazanerija City Stadium; Attendance: 4,000; Referee: Wolfgang Sowa (Austria)

6 September UEFA Euro 2004 qualifying	Slovenia	3–1	Israel	Ljubljana, Slovenia
	Šiljak 35'; Knavs 37'; Čeh 78'	Report	Revivo 69'	Stadium: Bežigrad Stadium; Attendance: 8,000; Referee: Herbert Fandel (Germany)

10 September UEFA Euro 2004 qualifying	Slovenia	0–2	France	Ljubljana, Slovenia
		Report	Trezeguet 10'; Dacourt 71'	Stadium: Bežigrad Stadium; Attendance: 8,500; Referee: Domenico Messina (Italy)

11 October UEFA Euro 2004 qualifying	Cyprus	2–2	Slovenia	Limassol, Cyprus
	Georgiou 71'; Yiasoumi 82'	Report	Šiljak 12', 42'	Stadium: Tsirio Stadium; Attendance: 2,346; Referee: Tom Henning Øvrebø (Norway)

15 November UEFA Euro 2004 qualifying play-offs	Croatia	1–1	Slovenia	Zagreb, Croatia
	Pršo 5'	Report	Šiljak 22'	Stadium: Stadion Maksimir; Attendance: 34,657; Referee: Markus Merk (Germany)

19 November UEFA Euro 2004 qualifying play-offs	Slovenia	0–1	Croatia	Ljubljana, Slovenia
		Report	Pršo 61'	Stadium: Bežigrad Stadium; Attendance: 8,500; Referee: Urs Meier (Switzerland)

=== 2004 ===
18 February Friendly	Poland	2–0	Slovenia	San Fernando, Spain
	Mila 23'; Niedzielan 64'	Report		Stadium: Estadio Bahía Sur; Attendance: 150; Referee: Francisco López Barea (Spain)

31 March Friendly	Slovenia	0–1	Latvia	Celje, Slovenia
		Report	Verpakovskis 36'	Stadium: Arena Petrol; Attendance: 2,300; Referee: Anton Stredák (Slovakia)

28 April Friendly	Switzerland	2–1	Slovenia	Lancy, Switzerland
	Celestini 66'; Yakin 85'	Report	Zahovič 45'	Stadium: Stade de Genève; Attendance: 7,500; Referee: Ruud Bossen (Netherlands)

18 August Friendly	Slovenia	1–1	Serbia and Montenegro	Ljubljana, Slovenia
	Čeh 82'	Report	Jestrović 49'	Stadium: Bežigrad Stadium; Attendance: 5,000; Referee: Tom Øvrebø (Norway)

4 September 2006 FIFA World Cup qualification	Slovenia	3–0	Moldova	Celje, Slovenia
	Ačimovič 5', 27', 48'	Report		Stadium: Arena Petrol; Attendance: 3,620; Referee: Jouni Hyytiä (Finland)

8 September 2006 FIFA World Cup qualification	Scotland	0–0	Slovenia	Glasgow, Scotland
		Report		Stadium: Hampden Park; Attendance: 38,278; Referee: Claus Bo Larsen (Denmark)

9 October 2006 FIFA World Cup qualification	Slovenia	1–0	Italy	Celje, Slovenia
	Cesar 82'	Report		Stadium: Arena Petrol; Attendance: 9,262; Referee: Frank De Bleeckere (Belgium)

13 October 2006 FIFA World Cup qualification	Norway	3–0	Slovenia	Oslo, Norway
	Carew 7'; Pedersen 60'; Ødegaard 90'	Report		Stadium: Ullevaal Stadion; Attendance: 24,907; Referee: Valentin Valentinovich Ivanov (Russia)

17 November Friendly	Slovakia	0–0	Slovenia	Trnava, Slovakia
		Report		Stadium: Štadión Antona Malatinského; Attendance: 5,482; Referee: Tommy Skjerven (Norway)

=== 2005 ===
9 February Friendly	Slovenia	0–3	Czech Republic	Celje, Slovenia
		Report	Koller 10'; Jun 47'; Polák 79'	Stadium: Arena Petrol; Attendance: 4,000; Referee: Marijo Strahonja (Croatia)

26 March Friendly	Slovenia	0–1	Germany	Celje, Slovenia
		Report	Podolski 27'	Stadium: Arena Petrol; Attendance: 9,200; Referee: Graham Poll (England)

30 March 2006 FIFA World Cup qualification	Slovenia	1–1	Belarus	Celje, Slovenia
	Rodić 44'	Report	Kulchiy 49'	Stadium: Arena Petrol; Attendance: 6,450; Referee: Khalil Al Ghamdi (Saudi Arabia)

4 June 2006 FIFA World Cup qualification	Belarus	1–1	Slovenia	Minsk, Belarus
	Belkevich 18'	Report	Čeh 17'	Stadium: Dinamo Stadium; Attendance: 29,042; Referee: Martin Hansson (Sweden)

17 August Friendly	Wales	0–0	Slovenia	Swansea, Wales
		Report		Stadium: New Stadium Swansea; Attendance: 11,087; Referee: Ian Stokes (Republic of Ireland)

3 September 2006 FIFA World Cup qualification	Slovenia	2–3	Norway	Celje, Slovenia
	Cimirotič 4'; Žlogar 81'	Report	Carew 3'; Lundekvam 24'; Pedersen 90'	Stadium: Arena Petrol; Attendance: 10,055; Referee: Luis Medina Cantalejo (Spain)

7 September 2006 FIFA World Cup qualification	Moldova	1–2	Slovenia	Chișinău, Moldova
	Rogaciov 34'	Report	Lavrič 47'; Mavrič 57'	Stadium: Stadionul Republican; Attendance: 7,200; Referee: Yuriy Baskakov (Russia)

8 October 2006 FIFA World Cup qualification	Italy	1–0	Slovenia	Palermo, Italy
	Zaccardo 78'	Report		Stadium: Stadio Renzo Barbera; Attendance: 19,500; Referee: Éric Poulat (France)

12 October 2006 FIFA World Cup qualification	Slovenia	0–3	Scotland	Celje, Slovenia
		Report	Fletcher 4'; McFadden 47'; Hartley 83'	Stadium: Arena Petrol; Attendance: 9,100; Referee: René Temmink (Netherlands)

=== 2006 ===
28 February Cyprus International Tournament	Cyprus	0–1	Slovenia	Larnaca, Cyprus
		Report	Ljubijankić 85'	Stadium: Antonis Papadopoulos Stadium; Attendance: 1,000; Referee: Tony Asumaa (Finland)

1 March Cyprus International Tournament	Romania	2–0	Slovenia	Larnaca, Cyprus
	Mazilu 22'; Pečnik 53' (o.g.)	Report		Stadium: GSZ Stadium; Attendance: 300; Referee: Valery Vyalichka (Belarus)

31 May Friendly	Slovenia	3–1	Trinidad and Tobago	Celje, Slovenia
	Novaković 4', 16', 77'	Report	Birchall 26'	Stadium: Arena Petrol; Attendance: 2,500; Referee: Dragomir Tanović (Serbia and Montenegro)

4 June Friendly	Ivory Coast	3–0	Slovenia	Bondoufle, France
	Drogba 35', 36'; Akale 70'	Report		Stadium: Stade Robert Bobin; Attendance: 8,000; Referee: Gérald Grégoire (France)

15 August Friendly	Slovenia	1–1	Israel	Celje, Slovenia
	Šukalo 83'	Report	Benayoun 80'	Stadium: Arena Petrol; Attendance: 2,500; Referee: Pavel Královec (Czech Republic)

6 September UEFA Euro 2008 qualifying	Bulgaria	3–0	Slovenia	Sofia, Bulgaria
	Bojinov 58'; M. Petrov 72'; Telkiyski 81'	Report		Stadium: Vasil Levski National Stadium; Attendance: 16,543; Referee: Claus Bo Larsen (Denmark)

7 October UEFA Euro 2008 qualifying	Slovenia	2–0	Luxembourg	Celje, Slovenia
	Novaković 30'; Koren 44'	Report		Stadium: Arena Petrol; Attendance: 3,500; Referee: Panikos Kailis (Cyprus)

11 October UEFA Euro 2008 qualifying	Belarus	4–2	Slovenia	Minsk, Belarus
	Kovba 17'; Kornilenko 52', 59'; Korytko 85'	Report	Cesar 19'; Lavrič 44'	Stadium: Dinamo Stadium; Attendance: 21,150; Referee: Viktor Kassai (Hungary)

=== 2007 ===
7 February Friendly	Slovenia	1–0	Estonia	Domžale, Slovenia
	Lavrič 34' (pen.)	Report		Stadium: Domžale Sports Park; Attendance: 2,900; Referee: Damien Ledentu (France)

24 March UEFA Euro 2008 qualifying	Albania	0–0	Slovenia	Shkodër, Albania
		Report		Stadium: Loro Boriçi Stadium; Attendance: 12,000; Referee: Joseph Attard (Malta)

28 March UEFA Euro 2008 qualifying	Slovenia	0–1	Netherlands	Celje, Slovenia
		Report	Van Bronckhorst 86'	Stadium: Arena Petrol; Attendance: 9,520; Referee: Manuel Mejuto González (Spain)

2 June UEFA Euro 2008 qualifying	Slovenia	1–2	Romania	Celje, Slovenia
	Vršič 90'	Report	Tamaș 50'; Nicoliță 69'	Stadium: Arena Petrol; Attendance: 7,000; Referee: Stuart Dougal (Scotland)

6 June UEFA Euro 2008 qualifying	Romania	2–0	Slovenia	Timișoara, Romania
	Mutu 41'; Contra 70'	Report		Stadium: Stadionul Dan Păltinișanu; Attendance: 18,000; Referee: Alon Yefet (Israel)

22 August Friendly	Montenegro	1–1	Slovenia	Podgorica, Montenegro
	Vučinić 28' (pen.)	Report	Vršič 42'	Stadium: Podgorica City Stadium; Attendance: 8,000; Referee: Claudio Circhetta (Switzerland)

8 September UEFA Euro 2008 qualifying	Luxembourg	0–3	Slovenia	Luxembourg City, Luxembourg
		Report	Lavrič 7', 47'; Novaković 37'	Stadium: Stade Josy Barthel; Attendance: 2,012; Referee: Serhiy Berezka (Ukraine)

12 September UEFA Euro 2008 qualifying	Slovenia	1–0	Belarus	Celje, Slovenia
	Lavrič 3' (pen.)	Report		Stadium: Arena Petrol; Attendance: 3,500; Referee: Viaceslav Banari (Moldova)

13 October UEFA Euro 2008 qualifying	Slovenia	0–0	Albania	Celje, Slovenia
		Report		Stadium: Arena Petrol; Attendance: 4,625; Referee: Duarte Gomes (Portugal)

17 October UEFA Euro 2008 qualifying	Netherlands	2–0	Slovenia	Eindhoven, Netherlands
	Sneijder 14'; Huntelaar 87'	Report		Stadium: Philips Stadion; Attendance: 32,500; Referee: Nicola Rizzoli (Italy)

21 November UEFA Euro 2008 qualifying	Slovenia	0–2	Bulgaria	Celje, Slovenia
		Report	Georgiev 81'; Berbatov 84'	Stadium: Arena Petrol; Attendance: 3,600; Referee: Howard Webb (England)

=== 2008 ===
6 February Friendly	Slovenia	1–2	Denmark	Nova Gorica, Slovenia
	Novaković 38'	Report	Tomasson 31' (pen.); Bendtner 63'	Stadium: Nova Gorica Sports Park; Attendance: 1,500; Referee: Thorsten Kinhöfer (Germany)

26 March Friendly	Hungary	0–1	Slovenia	Zalaegerszeg, Hungary
		Report	Šišić 59'	Stadium: ZTE Arena; Attendance: 6,000; Referee: Stefan Meßner (Austria)

26 May Friendly	Sweden	1–0	Slovenia	Gothenburg, Sweden
	Linderoth 41'	Report		Stadium: Ullevi; Attendance: 21,118; Referee: Willie Collum (Scotland)

20 August Friendly	Slovenia	2–3	Croatia	Maribor, Slovenia
	Šuler 4'; Šišić 55' (pen.)	Report	Rakitić 37', 64'; Srna 59' (pen.)	Stadium: Ljudski vrt Attendance: 11,100; Referee: Claudio Circhetta (Switzerland)

6 September 2010 FIFA World Cup qualification	Poland	1–1	Slovenia	Wrocław, Poland
	Żewłakow 17' (pen.)	Report	Dedić 35'	Stadium: Stadion Oporowska; Attendance: 8,400; Referee: Kristinn Jakobsson (Iceland)

10 September 2010 FIFA World Cup qualification	Slovenia	2–1	Slovakia	Maribor, Slovenia
	Novaković 22', 82'	Report	Jakubko 83'	Stadium: Ljudski vrt Attendance: 9,900; Referee: Svein Oddvar Moen (Norway)

11 October 2010 FIFA World Cup qualification	Slovenia	2–0	Northern Ireland	Maribor, Slovenia
	Novaković 83'; Ljubijankić 84'	Report		Stadium: Ljudski vrt Attendance: 12,385; Referee: Eduardo Iturralde González (Spain)

15 October 2010 FIFA World Cup qualification	Czech Republic	1–0	Slovenia	Teplice, Czech Republic
	Sionko 62'	Report		Stadium: Na Stínadlech; Attendance: 15,220; Referee: Martin Atkinson (England)

19 November Friendly	Slovenia	3–4	Bosnia and Herzegovina	Maribor, Slovenia
	Koren 27'; Novakovič 64' (pen.), 75'	Report	Ibišević 2', 62'; Misimović 11' (pen.); Džeko 53'	Stadium: Ljudski vrt Attendance: 10,000; Referee: Petteri Kari (Finland)

=== 2009 ===
11 February Friendly	Belgium	2–0	Slovenia	Genk, Belgium
	Van Buyten 20', 85'	Report		Stadium: Cristal Arena; Attendance: 13,135; Referee: Sascha Kever (Switzerland)

28 March 2010 FIFA World Cup qualification	Slovenia	0–0	Czech Republic	Maribor, Slovenia
		Report		Stadium: Ljudski vrt Attendance: 12,376; Referee: Pedro Proença (Portugal)

1 April 2010 FIFA World Cup qualification	Northern Ireland	1–0	Slovenia	Belfast, Northern Ireland
	Feeney 73'	Report		Stadium: Windsor Park; Attendance: 13,243; Referee: Alon Yefet (Israel)

12 August 2010 FIFA World Cup qualification	Slovenia	5–0	San Marino	Maribor, Slovenia
	Koren 19', 74'; Radosavljević 39'; Kirm 54'; Ljubijankić 90+3'	Report		Stadium: Ljudski vrt Attendance: 4,400; Referee: Dimitar Meckarovski (Macedonia)

5 September Friendly	England	2–1	Slovenia	London, England
	Lampard 31' (pen.); Defoe 63'	Report	Ljubijankić 85'	Stadium: Wembley Stadium; Attendance: 67,232; Referee: Jonas Eriksson (Sweden)

9 September 2010 FIFA World Cup qualification	Slovenia	3–0	Poland	Maribor, Slovenia
	Dedić 13'; Novaković 44'; Birsa 62'	Report		Stadium: Ljudski vrt Attendance: 10,226; Referee: Willie Collum (Scotland)

10 October 2010 FIFA World Cup qualification	Slovakia	0–2	Slovenia	Bratislava, Slovakia
		Report	Birsa 56'; Pečnik 90+3'	Stadium: Tehelné pole Attendance: 23,800; Referee: Wolfgang Stark (Germany)

14 October 2010 FIFA World Cup qualification	San Marino	0–3	Slovenia	Serravalle, San Marino
		Report	Novaković 24'; Stevanović 68'; Šuler 81'	Stadium: San Marino Stadium; Attendance: 1,745; Referee: Zsolt Szabó (Hungary)

14 November 2010 FIFA World Cup qual. play-offs	Russia	2–1	Slovenia	Moscow, Russia
	Bilyaletdinov 40', 52'	Report	Pečnik 88'	Stadium: Luzhniki Stadium; Attendance: 71,600; Referee: Claus Bo Larsen (Denmark)

18 November 2010 FIFA World Cup qual. play-offs	Slovenia	1–0 (a) (2–2 agg.)	Russia	Maribor, Slovenia
	Dedić 44'	Report		Stadium: Ljudski vrt Attendance: 12,510; Referee: Terje Hauge (Norway)

=== 2010 ===
3 March Friendly	Slovenia	4–1	Qatar	Maribor, Slovenia
	Novaković 14'; Cesar 30'; Kirm 34'; Jokić 66'	Report	Fábio 44'	Stadium: Ljudski vrt Attendance: 4,900; Referee: Pol van Boekel (Netherlands)

4 June Friendly	Slovenia	3–1	New Zealand	Maribor, Slovenia
	Novaković 7', 30'; Kirm 44'	Report	Fallon 20'	Stadium: Ljudski vrt Attendance: 10,950; Referee: Anastasios Kakos (Greece)

13 June 2010 FIFA World Cup Group C	Algeria	0–1	Slovenia	Polokwane, South Africa
		Report	Koren 79'	Stadium: Peter Mokaba Stadium; Attendance: 30,325; Referee: Carlos Batres (Guatemala)

18 June 2010 FIFA World Cup Group C	Slovenia	2–2	United States	Johannesburg, South Africa
	Birsa 13'; Ljubijankić 42'	Report	Donovan 48'; Bradley 82'	Stadium: Ellis Park Stadium; Attendance: 45,573; Referee: Koman Coulibaly (Mali)

23 June 2010 FIFA World Cup Group C	England	1–0	Slovenia	Port Elizabeth, South Africa
	Defoe 22'	Report		Stadium: Nelson Mandela Bay Stadium; Attendance: 36,893; Referee: Wolfgang Stark (Germany)

11 August Friendly	Slovenia	2–0	Australia	Ljubljana, Slovenia
	Dedić 78'; Ljubijankić 90'	Report		Stadium: Stožice Stadium; Attendance: 16,135; Referee: Paolo Tagliavento (Italy)

3 September UEFA Euro 2012 qualifying	Slovenia	0–1	Northern Ireland	Maribor, Slovenia
		Report	Evans 70'	Stadium: Ljudski vrt Attendance: 12,435; Referee: Cristian Balaj (Romania)

7 September UEFA Euro 2012 qualifying	Serbia	1–1	Slovenia	Belgrade, Serbia
	Žigić 81'	Report	Novaković 63'	Stadium: Red Star Stadium; Attendance: 24,028; Referee: Olegário Benquerença (Portugal)

8 October UEFA Euro 2012 qualifying	Slovenia	5–1	Faroe Islands	Ljubljana, Slovenia
	Matavž 25', 36', 65'; Novaković 72' (pen.); Dedič 84'	Report	Mouritsen 90+3'	Stadium: Stožice Stadium; Attendance: 15,750; Referee: Stanislav Todorov (Bulgaria)

12 October UEFA Euro 2012 qualifying	Estonia	0–1	Slovenia	Tallinn, Estonia
		Report	Sidorenkov 67' (o.g.)	Stadium: A. Le Coq Arena; Attendance: 5,722; Referee: Tommy Skjerven (Norway)

17 November Friendly	Slovenia	1–2	Georgia	Koper, Slovenia
	Cesar 53'	Report	Guruli 67'; Ananidze 68'	Stadium: Bonifika Stadium; Attendance: 4,100; Referee: Mark Whitby (Wales)

=== 2011 ===
9 February Friendly	Albania	1–2	Slovenia	Tirana, Albania
	Bulku 62'	Report	Novaković 24'; Dedić 90' (pen.)	Stadium: Qemal Stafa Stadium; Attendance: 5,000; Referee: Michalis Koukoulakis (Greece)

25 March UEFA Euro 2012 qualifying	Slovenia	0–1	Italy	Ljubljana, Slovenia
		Report	Motta 73'	Stadium: Stožice Stadium; Attendance: 15,790; Referee: Felix Brych (Germany)

29 March UEFA Euro 2012 qualifying	Northern Ireland	0–0	Slovenia	Belfast, Northern Ireland
		Report		Stadium: Windsor Park; Attendance: 11,299; Referee: Björn Kuipers (Netherlands)

3 June UEFA Euro 2012 qualifying	Faroe Islands	0–2	Slovenia	Toftir, Faroe Islands
		Report	Matavž 29'; Baldvinsson 47' (o.g.)	Stadium: Svangaskarð; Attendance: 974; Referee: Oliver Drachta (Austria)

10 August Friendly	Slovenia	0–0	Belgium	Ljubljana, Slovenia
		Report		Stadium: Stožice Stadium; Attendance: 12,230; Referee: Marijo Strahonja (Croatia)

2 September UEFA Euro 2012 qualifying	Slovenia	1–2	Estonia	Ljubljana, Slovenia
	Matavž 78'	Report	Vassiljev 29' (pen.); Purje 81'	Stadium: Stožice Stadium; Attendance: 15,480; Referee: Stephan Studer (Switzerland)

6 September UEFA Euro 2012 qualifying	Italy	1–0	Slovenia	Florence, Italy
	Pazzini 85'	Report		Stadium: Stadio Artemio Franchi; Attendance: 18,000; Referee: Svein Oddvar Moen (Norway)

11 October UEFA Euro 2012 qualifying	Slovenia	1–0	Serbia	Maribor, Slovenia
	Vršič 45+1'	Report		Stadium: Ljudski vrt Attendance: 9,848; Referee: Frank De Bleeckere (Belgium)

15 November Friendly	Slovenia	2–3	United States	Ljubljana, Slovenia
	Matavž 26', 61'	Report	Buddle 9'; Dempsey 41'; Altidore 43'	Stadium: Stožice Stadium; Attendance: 8,140; Referee: Robert Schörgenhofer (Austria)

=== 2012 ===
29 February Friendly	Slovenia	1–1	Scotland	Koper, Slovenia
	Kirm 33'	Report	Berra 40'	Stadium: Bonifika Stadium; Attendance: 3,983; Referee: Aleksandar Stavrev (Macedonia)

26 May Friendly	Greece	1–1	Slovenia	Kufstein, Austria
	Torosidis 8'	Report	Kurtić 87'	Stadium: Kufstein Arena; Attendance: 1,000; Referee: Robert Schörgenhofer (Austria)

15 August Friendly	Slovenia	4–3	Romania	Ljubljana, Slovenia
	Cesar 4'; Dedić 51' (pen.), 60'; Kirm 70'	Report	Papp 56'; Torje 68' (pen.); Grozav 80'	Stadium: Stožice Stadium; Attendance: 4,600; Referee: Emir Alečković (Bosnia and Herzegovina)

7 September 2014 FIFA World Cup qualification	Slovenia	0–2	Switzerland	Ljubljana, Slovenia
		Report	Xhaka 20'; Inler 51'	Stadium: Stožice Stadium; Attendance: 13,213; Referee: Paolo Tagliavento (Italy)

11 September 2014 FIFA World Cup qualification	Norway	2–1	Slovenia	Oslo, Norway
	Henriksen 26'; Riise 90+4' (pen.)	Report	Šuler 17'	Stadium: Ullevaal Stadion; Attendance: 11,168; Referee: Fırat Aydınus (Turkey)

12 October 2014 FIFA World Cup qualification	Slovenia	2–1	Cyprus	Maribor, Slovenia
	Matavž 38', 61'	Report	Aloneftis 83'	Stadium: Ljudski vrt Attendance: 7,988; Referee: Ivan Kružliak (Slovakia)

16 October 2014 FIFA World Cup qualification	Albania	1–0	Slovenia	Tirana, Albania
	Roshi 36'	Report		Stadium: Qemal Stafa Stadium; Attendance: 9,000; Referee: Martin Hansson (Sweden)

14 November Friendly	Macedonia	3–2	Slovenia	Skopje, Macedonia
	Tasevski 26'; Jahović 41'; Ibraimi 51'	Report	Pečnik 49', 63'	Stadium: Philip II Arena; Attendance: 3,000; Referee: Danilo Grujić (Serbia)

=== 2013 ===
6 February Friendly	Slovenia	0–3	Bosnia and Herzegovina	Ljubljana, Slovenia
		Report	Ibišević 33'; Pjanić 42'; Svraka 80'	Stadium: Stožice Stadium; Attendance: 14,000; Referee: Pavel Královec (Czech Republic)

22 March 2014 FIFA World Cup qualification	Slovenia	1–2	Iceland	Ljubljana, Slovenia
	Novaković 34'	Report	Sigurðsson 55', 78'	Stadium: Stožice Stadium; Attendance: 5,803; Referee: Stavros Tritsonis (Greece)

31 May Friendly	Slovenia	2–0	Turkey	Bielefeld, Germany
	Novaković 11'; Matavž 65'	Report		Stadium: Bielefelder Alm; Attendance: 9,146; Referee: Marco Fritz (Germany)

7 June 2014 FIFA World Cup qualification	Iceland	2–4	Slovenia	Reykjavík, Iceland
	Bjarnason 22'; Finnbogason 26' (pen.)	Report	Kirm 11'; Birsa 31' (pen.); Cesar 61'; Krhin 85'	Stadium: Laugardalsvöllur; Attendance: 9,202; Referee: Felix Zwayer (Germany)

14 August Friendly	Finland	2–0	Slovenia	Turku, Finland
	Moisander 35'; Hämäläinen 82'	Report		Stadium: Veritas Stadion; Attendance: 5,859; Referee: Simon Lee Evans (Wales)

6 September 2014 FIFA World Cup qualification	Slovenia	1–0	Albania	Ljubljana, Slovenia
	Kampl 19'	Report		Stadium: Stožice Stadium; Attendance: 13,843; Referee: István Vad (Hungary)

10 September 2014 FIFA World Cup qualification	Cyprus	0–2	Slovenia	Strovolos, Cyprus
		Report	Novaković 12'; Iličić 80'	Stadium: GSP Stadium; Attendance: 714; Referee: Ruddy Buquet (France)

11 October 2014 FIFA World Cup qualification	Slovenia	3–0	Norway	Maribor, Slovenia
	Novaković 13', 15', 49'	Report		Stadium: Ljudski vrt Attendance: 10,890; Referee: Carlos Velasco Carballo (Spain)

15 October 2014 FIFA World Cup qualification	Switzerland	1–0	Slovenia	Bern, Switzerland
	Xhaka 73'	Report		Stadium: Stade de Suisse; Attendance: 22,014; Referee: Björn Kuipers (Netherlands)

19 November Friendly	Slovenia	1–0	Canada	Celje, Slovenia
	Birsa 52'	Report		Stadium: Arena Petrol; Attendance: 2,500; Referee: Hüseyin Göçek (Turkey)

=== 2014 ===
5 March Friendly	Algeria	2–0	Slovenia	Blida, Algeria
	Soudani 45'; Taïder 56'	Report		Stadium: Mustapha Tchaker Stadium; Attendance: 26,000; Referee: Sidi Alioum (Cameroon)

4 June Friendly	Uruguay	2–0	Slovenia	Montevideo, Uruguay
	Cavani 37'; Stuani 76'	Report		Stadium: Estadio Centenario; Attendance: 55,000; Referee: Patricio Loustau (Argentina)

7 June Friendly	Argentina	2–0	Slovenia	La Plata, Argentina
	Álvarez 12'; Messi 76'	Report		Stadium: Estadio Ciudad de La Plata; Attendance: 52,000; Referee: Martín Vázquez (Uruguay)

8 September UEFA Euro 2016 qualifying	Estonia	1–0	Slovenia	Tallinn, Estonia
	Purje 86'	Report		Stadium: A. Le Coq Arena; Attendance: 6,561; Referee: Szymon Marciniak (Poland)

9 October UEFA Euro 2016 qualifying	Slovenia	1–0	Switzerland	Maribor, Slovenia
	Novaković 79' (pen.)	Report		Stadium: Ljudski vrt Attendance: 8,500; Referee: Wolfgang Stark (Germany)

12 October UEFA Euro 2016 qualifying	Lithuania	0–2	Slovenia	Vilnius, Lithuania
		Report	Novaković 33', 37'	Stadium: LFF Stadium; Attendance: 4,250; Referee: Michael Koukoulakis (Greece)

15 November UEFA Euro 2016 qualifying	England	3–1	Slovenia	London, England
	Rooney 59' (pen.); Welbeck 66', 72'	Report	Henderson 58' (o.g.)	Stadium: Wembley Stadium; Attendance: 82,305; Referee: Olegário Benquerença (Portugal)

18 November Friendly	Slovenia	0–1	Colombia	Ljubljana, Slovenia
		Report	Ramos 43'	Stadium: Stožice Stadium; Attendance: 15,230; Referee: Pappas Andreas (Greece)

=== 2015 ===
27 March UEFA Euro 2016 qualifying	Slovenia	6–0	San Marino	Ljubljana, Slovenia
	Iličić 10'; Kampl 49'; Struna 50'; Novaković 52'; Lazarević 73'; Ilić 88'	Report		Stadium: Stožice Stadium; Attendance: 8,325; Referee: Oliver Drachta (Austria)

30 March Friendly	Qatar	1–0	Slovenia	Doha, Qatar
	Hassan 46'	Report		Stadium: Jassim Bin Hamad Stadium; Attendance: 200; Referee: Kim Sang-woo (South Korea)

14 June UEFA Euro 2016 qualifying	Slovenia	2–3	England	Ljubljana, Slovenia
	Novaković 37'; Pečnik 84'	Report	Wilshere 57', 73'; Rooney 86'	Stadium: Stožice Stadium; Attendance: 15,796; Referee: Alberto Undiano Mallenco (Spain)

5 September UEFA Euro 2016 qualifying	Switzerland	3–2	Slovenia	Basel, Switzerland
	Drmić 80', 90+4'; Stocker 84'	Report	Novaković 45'; Cesar 48'	Stadium: St. Jakob-Park; Attendance: 25,750; Referee: Pavel Královec (Czech Republic)

8 September UEFA Euro 2016 qualifying	Slovenia	1–0	Estonia	Maribor, Slovenia
	Berić 63'	Report		Stadium: Ljudski vrt Attendance: 6,868; Referee: Anastasios Sidiropoulos (Greece)

9 October UEFA Euro 2016 qualifying	Slovenia	1–1	Lithuania	Ljubljana, Slovenia
	Birsa 45+1' (pen.)	Report	Novikovas 79' (pen.)	Stadium: Stožice Stadium; Attendance: 10,498; Referee: Björn Kuipers (Netherlands)

12 October UEFA Euro 2016 qualifying	San Marino	0–2	Slovenia	Serravalle, San Marino
		Report	Cesar 54'; Pečnik 74'	Stadium: San Marino Stadium; Attendance: 781; Referee: Aleksandar Stavrev (Macedonia)

14 November UEFA Euro 2016 qualifying play-offs	Ukraine	2–0	Slovenia	Lviv, Ukraine
	Yarmolenko 22'; Seleznyov 54'	Report		Stadium: Arena Lviv; Attendance: 32,592; Referee: Jonas Eriksson (Sweden)

17 November UEFA Euro 2016 qualifying play-offs	Slovenia	1–1 (1–3 agg.)	Ukraine	Maribor, Slovenia
	Cesar 11'	Report	Yarmolenko 90+7'	Stadium: Ljudski vrt Attendance: 12,702; Referee: Cüneyt Çakır (Turkey)

=== 2016 ===
23 March Friendly	Slovenia	1–0	Macedonia	Koper, Slovenia
	Bezjak 58'	Report		Stadium: Bonifika Stadium; Attendance: 3,000; Referee: Milorad Mažić (Serbia)

28 March Friendly	Northern Ireland	1–0	Slovenia	Belfast, Northern Ireland
	Washington 41'	Report		Stadium: Windsor Park; Attendance: 13,500; Referee: Kristo Tohver (Estonia)

30 May Friendly	Sweden	0–0	Slovenia	Malmö, Sweden
		Report		Stadium: Swedbank Stadion; Attendance: 16,925; Referee: Jakob Kehlet (Denmark)

5 June Friendly	Slovenia	0–1	Turkey	Ljubljana, Slovenia
		Report	Yılmaz 5'	Stadium: Stožice Stadium; Attendance: 7,209; Referee: Marco Guida (Italy)

4 September 2018 FIFA World Cup qualification	Lithuania	2–2	Slovenia	Vilnius, Lithuania
	Černych 32'; Slivka 34'	Report	Krhin 77'; Cesar 90+3'	Stadium: LFF Stadium; Attendance: 4,114; Referee: Artur Soares Dias (Portugal)

8 October 2018 FIFA World Cup qualification	Slovenia	1–0	Slovakia	Ljubljana, Slovenia
	Kronaveter 74'	Report		Stadium: Stožice Stadium; Attendance: 10,492; Referee: Nicola Rizzoli (Italy)

11 October 2018 FIFA World Cup qualification	Slovenia	0–0	England	Ljubljana, Slovenia
		Report		Stadium: Stožice Stadium; Attendance: 13,274; Referee: Deniz Aytekin (Germany)

11 November 2018 FIFA World Cup qualification	Malta	0–1	Slovenia	Attard, Malta
		Report	Verbič 47'	Stadium: Ta' Qali National Stadium; Attendance: 4,207; Referee: Paweł Raczkowski (Poland)

14 November Friendly	Poland	1–1	Slovenia	Wrocław, Poland
	Teodorczyk 79'	Report	Mevlja 24'	Stadium: Municipal Stadium; Attendance: 40,119; Referee: Björn Kuipers (Netherlands)

=== 2017 ===
26 March 2018 FIFA World Cup qualification	Scotland	1–0	Slovenia	Glasgow, Scotland
	Martin 88'	Report		Stadium: Hampden Park; Attendance: 20,435; Referee: Björn Kuipers (Netherlands)

10 June 2018 FIFA World Cup qualification	Slovenia	2–0	Malta	Ljubljana, Slovenia
	Iličić 45+2'; Novaković 84'	Report		Stadium: Stožice Stadium; Attendance: 7,839; Referee: Simon Lee Evans (Wales)

1 September 2018 FIFA World Cup qualification	Slovakia	1–0	Slovenia	Trnava, Slovakia
	Mevlja 81' (o.g.)	Report		Stadium: Štadión Antona Malatinského; Attendance: 16,896; Referee: Antonio Mateu Lahoz (Spain)

4 September 2018 FIFA World Cup qualification	Slovenia	4–0	Lithuania	Ljubljana, Slovenia
	Iličić 25' (pen.), 61' (pen.); Verbič 82'; Birsa 90'	Report		Stadium: Stožice Stadium; Attendance: 6,230; Referee: István Kovács (Romania)

5 October 2018 FIFA World Cup qualification	England	1–0	Slovenia	London, England
	Kane 90+4'	Report		Stadium: Wembley Stadium; Attendance: 61,598; Referee: Felix Zwayer (Germany)

8 October 2018 FIFA World Cup qualification	Slovenia	2–2	Scotland	Ljubljana, Slovenia
	Bezjak 52', 72'	Report	Griffiths 32'; Snodgrass 88'	Stadium: Stožice Stadium; Attendance: 11,123; Referee: Jonas Eriksson (Sweden)

=== 2018 ===
23 March Friendly	Austria	3–0	Slovenia	Klagenfurt, Austria
	Alaba 15'; Arnautović 36', 51'	Report		Stadium: Wörthersee Stadion; Attendance: 18,100; Referee: Stephan Klossner (Switzerland)

27 March Friendly	Slovenia	0–2	Belarus	Ljubljana, Slovenia
		Report	Skavysh 36'; Saroka 90+4'	Stadium: Stožice Stadium; Attendance: 4,327; Referee: Fran Jović (Croatia)

2 June Friendly	Montenegro	0–2	Slovenia	Podgorica, Montenegro
		Report	Bezjak 39' (pen.); Zajc 79'	Stadium: Podgorica City Stadium; Attendance: 2,944; Referee: Igor Pajač (Croatia)

6 September 2018–19 UEFA Nations League C	Slovenia	1–2	Bulgaria	Ljubljana, Slovenia
	Zajc 40'	Report	Kraev 3', 59'	Stadium: Stožice Stadium; Attendance: 5,100; Referee: Davide Massa (Italy)

9 September 2018–19 UEFA Nations League C	Cyprus	2–1	Slovenia	Nicosia, Cyprus
	Sotiriou 69'; Stojanović 89' (o.g.)	Report	Berić 54'	Stadium: GSP Stadium; Attendance: 1,115; Referee: Andris Treimanis (Latvia)

13 October 2018–19 UEFA Nations League C	Norway	1–0	Slovenia	Oslo, Norway
	Selnæs 45+5'	Report		Stadium: Ullevaal Stadion; Attendance: 14,712; Referee: Daniel Siebert (Germany)

16 October 2018–19 UEFA Nations League C	Slovenia	1–1	Cyprus	Ljubljana, Slovenia
	Skubic 83'	Report	Papoulis 37'	Stadium: Stožice Stadium; Attendance: 5,318; Referee: Mads-Kristoffer Kristoffersen (Denmark)

16 November 2018–19 UEFA Nations League C	Slovenia	1–1	Norway	Ljubljana, Slovenia
	Verbič 9'	Report	Johnsen 85'	Stadium: Stožice Stadium; Attendance: 10,254; Referee: Ruddy Buquet (France)

19 November 2018–19 UEFA Nations League C	Bulgaria	1–1	Slovenia	Sofia, Bulgaria
	Ivanov 68'	Report	Zajc 75'	Stadium: Vasil Levski National Stadium; Attendance: 3,092; Referee: Hüseyin Göçek (Turkey)

=== 2019 ===
21 March UEFA Euro 2020 qualifying	Israel	1–1	Slovenia	Haifa, Israel
	Zahavi 55'	Report	Šporar 48'	Stadium: Sammy Ofer Stadium; Attendance: 12,430; Referee: Tiago Martins (Portugal)

24 March UEFA Euro 2020 qualifying	Slovenia	1–1	North Macedonia	Ljubljana, Slovenia
	Zajc 34'	Report	Bardhi 47'	Stadium: Stožice Stadium; Attendance: 9,872; Referee: Xavier Estrada Fernández (Spain)

7 June UEFA Euro 2020 qualifying	Austria	1–0	Slovenia	Klagenfurt, Austria
	Burgstaller 74'	Report		Stadium: Wörthersee Stadion; Attendance: 19,200; Referee: Aleksei Kulbakov (Belarus)

10 June UEFA Euro 2020 qualifying	Latvia	0–5	Slovenia	Riga, Latvia
		Report	Črnigoj 24', 27'; Iličić 29' (pen.), 44'; Zajc 47'	Stadium: Daugava Stadium; Attendance: 4,011; Referee: Kevin Clancy (Scotland)

6 September UEFA Euro 2020 qualifying	Slovenia	2–0	Poland	Ljubljana, Slovenia
	Struna 35'; Šporar 65'	Report		Stadium: Stožice Stadium; Attendance: 15,231; Referee: Sergei Karasev (Russia)

9 September UEFA Euro 2020 qualifying	Slovenia	3–2	Israel	Ljubljana, Slovenia
	Verbič 43', 90'; Bezjak 66'	Report	Natkho 50'; Zahavi 63'	Stadium: Stožice Stadium; Attendance: 10,669; Referee: Anthony Taylor (England)

10 October UEFA Euro 2020 qualifying	North Macedonia	2–1	Slovenia	Skopje, North Macedonia
	Elmas 50', 68'	Report	Iličić 90+5' (pen.)	Stadium: Toše Proeski Arena; Attendance: 16,500; Referee: Danny Makkelie (Netherlands)

13 October UEFA Euro 2020 qualifying	Slovenia	0–1	Austria	Ljubljana, Slovenia
		Report	Posch 21'	Stadium: Stožice Stadium; Attendance: 15,108; Referee: Cüneyt Çakır (Turkey)

16 November UEFA Euro 2020 qualifying	Slovenia	1–0	Latvia	Ljubljana, Slovenia
	Tarasovs 53' (o.g.)	Report		Stadium: Stožice Stadium; Attendance: 11,924; Referee: Radu Petrescu (Romania)

19 November UEFA Euro 2020 qualifying	Poland	3–2	Slovenia	Warsaw, Poland
	Szymański 3'; Lewandowski 54'; Góralski 81'	Report	Matavž 14'; Iličić 61'	Stadium: National Stadium; Attendance: 53,946; Referee: Daniel Siebert (Germany)
