= UEFA Euro 1996 qualifying Group 4 =

Football tournament qualification stage

Standings and results for Group 4 of the UEFA Euro 1996 qualifying tournament.

== Standings ==
Pos	Team	Pld	W	D	L	GF	GA	GD	Pts	Qualification	(Croatia)	(Italy)	(Lithuania)	(Ukraine)	(Slovenia)	(Estonia)
1	Croatia	10	7	2	1	22	5	+17	23 (Note: Head-to-head points: Croatia 4, Italy 1.)	Qualify for final tournament	—	1–1	2–0	4–0	2–0	7–1
2	Italy	10	7	2	1	20	6	+14	23	Qualify for final tournament	1–2	—	4–0	3–1	1–0	4–1
3	Lithuania	10	5	1	4	13	12	+1	16		0–0	0–1	—	1–3	2–1	5–0
4	Ukraine	10	4	1	5	11	15	−4	13		1–0	0–2	0–2	—	0–0	3–0
5	Slovenia	10	3	2	5	13	13	0	11		1–2	1–1	1–2	3–2	—	3–0
6	Estonia	10	0	0	10	3	31	−28	0		0–2	0–2	0–1	0–1	1–3	—

Rules for classification: Qualification tiebreakers

== Results ==
4 September 1994
17:10 UTC+3

Estonia	0–2	Croatia
	Report	Šuker 44', 72'

Kadrioru Stadium, Tallinn
Attendance: 1,215
Referee: Václav Krondl (Czech Republic)
7 September 1994
20:15 UTC+2

Slovenia	1–1	Italy
Udovič 16'	Report	Costacurta 19'

Ljudski vrt, Maribor
Attendance: 5,200
Referee: Bernd Heynemann (Germany)
7 September 1994
19:00 UTC+3

Ukraine	0–2	Lithuania
	Report	Ivanauskas 53'; Skarbalius 61'

Republikan Stadium, Kyiv
Attendance: 25,000
Referee: Bo Karlsson (Sweden)

8 October 1994
20:00 UTC+2

Estonia	0–2	Italy
	Report	Panucci 20'; Casiraghi 77'

Kadrioru Stadium, Tallinn
Attendance: 3,850
Referee: Werner Müller (Switzerland)
9 October 1994
17:30 UTC+1

Croatia	2–0	Lithuania
Jerkan 58'; Kozniku 81'	Report

Stadion Maksimir, Zagreb
Attendance: 7,515
Referee: Alfred Wieser (Austria)
12 October 1994
19:00 UTC+2

Ukraine	0–0	Slovenia
	Report

Republikan Stadium, Kyiv
Attendance: 8,500
Referee: Atanas Uzunov (Bulgaria)

13 November 1994
17:00 UTC+2

Ukraine	3–0	Estonia
Konovalov 29'; Kirs 44' (o.g.); Huseynov 72'	Report

Republikan Stadium, Kyiv
Attendance: 4,000
Referee: Léon Schellings (Belgium)
16 November 1994
20:30 UTC+1

Italy	1–2	Croatia
D. Baggio 90'	Report	Šuker 32', 60'

Stadio Della Favorita, Palermo
Attendance: 33,570
Referee: Joël Quiniou (France)
16 November 1994
19:00 UTC+1

Slovenia	1–2	Lithuania
Zahovič 55'	Report	Sukristov 64'; Žuta 87'

Ljudski vrt, Maribor
Attendance: 4,000
Referee: Karol Ihring (Slovakia)

25 March 1995
20:15 UTC+1

Croatia	4–0	Ukraine
Boban 13'; Šuker 21', 79'; Prosinečki 71'	Report

Stadion Maksimir, Zagreb
Attendance: 11,156
Referee: Hans-Jürgen Weber (Germany)
25 March 1995
20:30 UTC+1

Italy	4–1	Estonia
Zola 45', 67'; Albertini 59'; Ravanelli 84'	Report	Reim 71'

Stadio Arechi, Salerno
Attendance: 38,000
Referee: Roger Philippi (Luxembourg)

29 March 1995
19:00 UTC+3

Lithuania	0–0	Croatia
	Report

Žalgiris Stadium, Vilnius
Attendance: 9,500
Referee: Keith Burge (Wales)
29 March 1995
21:30 UTC+3

Ukraine	0–2	Italy
	Report	Lombardo 12'; Zola 38'

Republikan Stadium, Kyiv
Attendance: 22,000
Referee: Sándor Puhl (Hungary)
29 March 1995
20:00 UTC+2

Slovenia	3–0	Estonia
Zahovič 40'; Gliha 52'; Kokol 90'	Report

Ljudski vrt, Maribor
Attendance: 1,850
Referee: José Mendes Pratas (Portugal)

26 April 1995
18:00 UTC+3

Estonia	0–1	Ukraine
	Report	Huseynov 17'

Kadrioru Stadium, Tallinn
Attendance: 1,100
Referee: Tore Hollung (Norway)
26 April 1995
20:00 UTC+3

Lithuania	0–1	Italy
	Report	Zola 11'

Žalgiris Stadium, Vilnius
Attendance: 15,000
Referee: Jim McCluskey (Scotland)
26 April 1995
20:15 UTC+2

Croatia	2–0	Slovenia
Prosinečki 17'; Šuker 90'	Report

Stadion Maksimir, Zagreb
Attendance: 14,059
Referee: Oğuz Sarvan (Turkey)

7 June 1995
19:00 UTC+3

Lithuania	2–1	Slovenia
Stonkus 47'; Šuika 72'	Report	Gliha 82'

Žalgiris Stadium, Vilnius
Attendance: 2,600
Referee: László Vágner (Hungary)

11 June 1995
18:00 UTC+3

Estonia	1–3	Slovenia
Reim 27'	Report	Novak 38', 69'; Zahovič 79'

Kadrioru Stadium, Tallinn
Attendance: 1,100
Referee: Paul Durkin (England)
11 June 1995
19:00 UTC+3

Ukraine	1–0	Croatia
Kalitvintsev 13'	Report

Republikan Stadium, Kyiv
Attendance: 8,500
Referee: Kurt Röthlisberger (Switzerland)

16 August 1995
17:00 UTC+3

Estonia	0–1	Lithuania
	Report	Maciulevičius 48'

Kadrioru Stadium, Tallinn
Attendance: 1,750
Referee: Karl-Erik Nilsson (Sweden)

3 September 1995
20:15 UTC+2

Croatia	7–1	Estonia
Mladenović 7'; Šuker 19' (pen.), 58', 89'; Bokšić 29'; Boban 42'; Štimac 56'	Report	Reim 17'

Stadion Maksimir, Zagreb
Attendance: 8,653
Referee: Aron Huzu (Romania)
6 September 1995
20:30 UTC+2

Italy	1–0	Slovenia
Ravanelli 13'	Report

Stadio Friuli, Udine
Attendance: 18,532
Referee: Ladislav Gadoši (Slovakia)
6 September 1995
19:30 UTC+3

Lithuania	1–3	Ukraine
Maciulevičius 17'	Report	Huseynov 66', 70'; Husin 83'

Žalgiris Stadium, Vilnius
Attendance: 6,000
Referee: Brendan Shorte (Ireland)

8 October 1995
20:30 UTC+1

Croatia	1–1	Italy
Šuker 48' (pen.)	Report	Albertini 29'

Stadion Poljud, Split
Attendance: 30,255
Referee: Jaap Uilenberg (Netherlands)
11 October 1995
18:00 UTC+2

Lithuania	5–0	Estonia
Maciulevičius 8'; Šuika 13', 39'; Šlekys 44'; Ivanauskas 61'	Report

Žalgiris Stadium, Vilnius
Attendance: 2,500
Referee: Didier Pauchard (France)
11 October 1995
18:00 UTC+1

Slovenia	3–2	Ukraine
Udovič 50', 90'; Zahovič 73'	Report	Skrypnyk 24'; Huseynov 44'

Centralni Stadion Bežigrad, Ljubljana
Attendance: 2,750
Referee: Alain Hamer (Luxembourg)

11 November 1995
20:30 UTC+1

Italy	3–1	Ukraine
Ravanelli 21', 49'; Maldini 53'	Report	Polunin 18'

Stadio San Nicola, Bari
Attendance: 43,999
Referee: Serge Muhmenthaler (Switzerland)

15 November 1995
20:15 UTC+1

Slovenia	1–2	Croatia
Gliha 36'	Report	Šuker 40' (pen.); Jurčević 55'

Centralni Stadion Bežigrad, Ljubljana
Attendance: 6,800
Referee: Guy Goethals (Belgium)
15 November 1995
20:15 UTC+1

Italy	4–0	Lithuania
Del Piero 52'; Zola 66', 80', 83'	Report

Stadio Giglio, Reggio Emilia
Attendance: 22,272
Referee: Manuel Díaz Vega (Spain)

== Goalscorers ==
There were 82 goals scored in 30 matches, for an average of 2.73 goals per match.

12 goals

- (Croatia national football team) Davor Šuker

7 goals

- (Italy national football team) Gianfranco Zola

5 goals

- (Ukraine national football team) Tymerlan Huseynov

4 goals

- (Italy national football team) Fabrizio Ravanelli
- (Slovenia national football team) Zlatko Zahovič

3 goals

- (Estonia national football team) Martin Reim
- (Lithuania national football team) Darius Maciulevičius
- (Lithuania national football team) Arūnas Šuika
- (Slovenia national football team) Primož Gliha
- (Slovenia national football team) Sašo Udovič

2 goals

- (Croatia national football team) Zvonimir Boban
- (Croatia national football team) Robert Prosinečki
- (Italy national football team) Demetrio Albertini
- (Lithuania national football team) Valdas Ivanauskas
- (Slovenia national football team) Džoni Novak

1 goal

- (Croatia national football team) Alen Bokšić
- (Croatia national football team) Nikola Jerkan
- (Croatia national football team) Nikola Jurčević
- (Croatia national football team) Ardian Kozniku
- (Croatia national football team) Mladen Mladenović
- (Croatia national football team) Igor Štimac
- (Italy national football team) Dino Baggio
- (Italy national football team) Pierluigi Casiraghi
- (Italy national football team) Alessandro Costacurta
- (Italy national football team) Alessandro Del Piero
- (Italy national football team) Attilio Lombardo
- (Italy national football team) Paolo Maldini
- (Italy national football team) Christian Panucci
- (Lithuania national football team) Aurelijus Skarbalius
- (Lithuania national football team) Vaidotas Šlekys
- (Lithuania national football team) Ramūnas Stonkus
- (Lithuania national football team) Vyacheslav Sukristov
- (Lithuania national football team) Audrius Žuta
- (Slovenia national football team) Vladimir Kokol
- (Ukraine national football team) Andriy Husin
- (Ukraine national football team) Yuriy Kalitvintsev
- (Ukraine national football team) Serhiy Konovalov
- (Ukraine national football team) Andriy Polunin
- (Ukraine national football team) Viktor Skrypnyk

1 own goal

- (Estonia national football team) Urmas Kirs (against Ukraine)
