= 1994 Malta International Football Tournament =

Tournament details
- Host country: Malta
- Dates: 8–12 February
- Teams: 4
- Venue(s): 1 (in 1 host city)

Final positions
- Champions: Slovenia (1st title)
- Runners-up: Georgia
- Third place: Tunisia
- Fourth place: Malta

Tournament statistics
- Matches played: 6
- Goals scored: 11 (1.83 per match)
- Top scorer(s): (Slovenia) Primož Gliha (2 goals)

The 1994 Malta International Football Tournament (known as the Rothmans Tournament for sponsorship reasons) was the seventh edition of the Malta International Tournament. The competition was played between 8 and 12 February, with games hosted at the National Stadium in Ta' Qali.

== Matches ==
Pos	Team	Pld	W	D	L	GF	GA	GD	Pts
1	Slovenia (C)	3	2	1	0	4	2	+2	7
2	Georgia	3	2	0	1	3	1	+2	6
3	Tunisia	3	0	2	1	3	5	−2	2
4	Malta (H)	3	0	1	2	1	3	−2	1

Source: RSSSF
(C) Champions; (H) Hosts
8 February 1994

Georgia	0–1	Slovenia
	Report	Gliha 80'

National Stadium, Ta' Qali
Attendance: 1,000
Referee: Lorry Sammut (Malta)

8 February 1994
18:30 (UTC+1:00)

Malta	1–1	Tunisia
Vella 44'	Report	Souayah ?'

National Stadium, Ta' Qali
Attendance: 650
Referee: Guram Sepiashvili (Georgia)

10 February 1994
14:30 (UTC+1:00)

Tunisia	2–2	Slovenia
	Report	Jermaniš 35'; Binkovski 51'

National Stadium, Ta' Qali
Attendance: 2,000
Referee: Alfred Micallef (Malta)

10 February 1994

Malta	0–1	Georgia
	Report	Ketsbaia 16' (pen.)

National Stadium, Ta' Qali
Attendance: 650
Referee: Darko Jamšek (Slovenia)

12 February 1994

Malta	0–1	Slovenia
	Report	Gliha 54'

National Stadium, Ta' Qali
Attendance: 3,000
Referee: Mohamed Bellagha (Tunisia)

12 February 1994

Georgia	2–0	Tunisia
Kavelashvili 48'; Kudinov 61'	Report

National Stadium, Ta' Qali
Attendance: 5,000
Referee: Charles Agius (Malta)

== Winner ==
1994 Malta International Football Tournament

Slovenia
First title

== Statistics ==
=== Goalscorers ===
There were 11 goals scored in 6 matches, for an average of 1.83 goals per match.

2 goals

- (Slovenia) Primož Gliha

1 goal

- (Georgia (country)) Mikheil Kavelashvili
- (Georgia (country)) Dimitri Kudinov
- (Georgia (country)) Temur Ketsbaia
- (Malta) Silvio Vella
- (Slovenia) Alfred Jermaniš
- (Slovenia) Peter Binkovski
- (Tunisia) Skander Souayah

Source: EU-Football

== See also ==
- China Cup
- Cyprus International Football Tournament
