= Alfred Jermaniš =

Slovenian footballer (born 1967)

Personal information
- Date of birth: 21 January 1967 (age 59)
- Place of birth: Koper, SFR Yugoslavia
- Height: 1.83 m (6 ft 0 in)
- Position: Midfielder

Youth career
- Koper

Senior career*
Years	Team	Apps	(Gls)
1985–1989	Koper		
1989–1992	Olimpija	66	(3)
1992	Yokohama Flügels	0	(0)
1992–1993	Koper	12	(2)
1993–1994	Mura	18	(1)
1994–1995	Rapid Vienna	18	(1)
1995–1996	Gorica	30	(7)
1996–1997	APOEL	24	(2)
1997–1998	Primorje	17	(3)
1998–1999	Korotan Prevalje	39	(11)
1999–2000	Rudar Velenje	14	(4)
2000–2004	Koper	80	(6)

International career
1992–1998	Slovenia	29	(1)

Managerial career
- 2003: Koper
- 2008: Bonifika
- 2012–2013: Izola
- 2021: Mačva Šabac
- 2024–2025: Adria
- * Club domestic league appearances and goals

Alfred Jermaniš (born 21 January 1967) is a Slovenian retired footballer who played as a midfielder.

== Club career ==
Jermaniš played in Slovenia, Japan, Austria and Cyprus. He won the Slovenian PrvaLiga title in 1991–92 with Olimpija and in 1995–96 with Gorica.

== International career ==
Jermaniš made his debut for Slovenia in the country's first-ever official match against Estonia on 3 June 1992 and earned a total of 29 caps, scoring 1 goal. His final international was an April 1998 friendly match against the Czech Republic.
