= Sašo Udovič =

Slovenian footballer (born 1968)

Personal information
- Date of birth: 12 December 1968 (age 57)
- Place of birth: Ljubljana, SFR Yugoslavia
- Height: 1.80 m (5 ft 11 in)
- Position: Forward

Youth career
- Slovan

Senior career*
Years	Team	Apps	(Gls)
1989–1991	Hajduk Split	1	(0)
1989–1990	→ Ljubljana (loan)		
1990–1991	→ Svoboda (loan)		
1991–1992	Olimpija	16	(4)
1992–1993	Slovan	53	(33)
1993–1996	Beveren	80	(29)
1996–1999	Lausanne	75	(19)
1999	Young Boys	11	(1)
1999–2001	LASK	36	(11)
2001–2002	Lausanne	10	(1)

International career
1993–2000	Slovenia	42	(16)
- * Club domestic league appearances and goals

Sašo Udovič (born 12 December 1968) is a Slovenian former professional footballer who played as a forward. With the Slovenia national team, he appeared at the 2000 UEFA European Championship.

== International career ==
Udovič made his debut for Slovenia in 1993 against Estonia and earned a total of 42 caps, scoring 16 goals until his final international in 2000.

== Career statistics ==
=== Club ===
Appearances and goals by club, season and competition
Club	Season	League			National cup (Note: Includes Slovenian Football Cup, Belgian Cup, Swiss Cup, Austrian Cup)		Continental (Note: Includes UEFA Cup, UEFA Intertoto Cup, UEFA Cup Winners' Cup)		Total	
Club	Season	Division	Apps	Goals	Apps	Goals	Apps	Goals	Apps	Goals
Hajduk Split	1990–91	Yugoslav First League	1	0			—		1	0
Olimpija	1991–92	Slovenian First League	16	4			—		16	4
Slovan	1991–92	Slovenian First League	20	8			—		20	8
Slovan	1992–93	Slovenian First League	33	25	2	1	—		35	26
Slovan	Total		53	33	2	1	0	0	55	34
Beveren	1993–94	Belgian First Division	34	19	1	0	—		35	19
Beveren	1994–95	Belgian First Division	19	0	1	4	—		20	4
Beveren	1995–96	Belgian First Division	27	10	2	1	4	2	33	13
Beveren	Total		80	29	4	5	4	2	88	36
Lausanne	1996–97	Nationalliga A	36	8	1	0	—		37	8
Lausanne	1997–98	Nationalliga A	21	4	1	0	3	0	25	4
Lausanne	1998–99	Nationalliga A	18	7	0	0	3	0	21	7
Lausanne	Total		75	19	2	0	6	0	83	19
Young Boys	1998–99	Nationalliga A	11	1	0	0	—		11	1
LASK	1999–2000	Austrian Bundesliga	27	11	1	0	2	0	30	11
LASK	2000–01	Austrian Bundesliga	9	0	0	0	—		9	0
LASK	Total		36	11	1	0	2	0	39	11
Lausanne	2001–02	Nationalliga A	10	1	0	0	—		10	1
Career total			282	98	9	6	12	2	303	106

=== International ===
Scores and results list Slovenia's goal tally first, score column indicates score after each Udovič goal.

List of international goals scored by Sašo Udovič
No.	Date	Venue	Opponent	Score	Result	Competition
1	7 April 1993	Bežigrad, Ljubljana, Slovenia	Estonia	2–0	2–0	Friendly
2	27 April 1994	Ljudski vrt, Maribor, Slovenia	Cyprus	2–0	3–0	Friendly
3	7 September 1994	Ljudski vrt, Maribor, Slovenia	Italy	1–0	1–1	UEFA Euro 1996 qualifying
4	11 October 1995	Bežigrad, Ljubljana, Slovenia	Ukraine	1–2	3–2	UEFA Euro 1996 qualifying
5	11 October 1995	Bežigrad, Ljubljana, Slovenia	Ukraine	3–2	3–2	UEFA Euro 1996 qualifying
6	7 February 1996	Ta' Qali, Ta' Qali, Malta	Iceland	1–1	7–1	Friendly
7	7 February 1996	Ta' Qali, Ta' Qali, Malta	Iceland	2–1	7–1	Friendly
8	7 February 1996	Ta' Qali, Ta' Qali, Malta	Iceland	3–1	7–1	Friendly
9	7 February 1996	Ta' Qali, Ta' Qali, Malta	Iceland	4–1	7–1	Friendly
10	7 February 1996	Ta' Qali, Ta' Qali, Malta	Iceland	5–1	7–1	Friendly
11	14 October 1998	Ljudski vrt, Maribor, Slovenia	Latvia	1–0	1–0	UEFA Euro 2000 qualifying
12	8 February 1999	Sultan Qaboos Sports Complex, Muscat, Oman	Oman	7–0	7–0	Friendly
13	19 February 2000	Sultan Qaboos Sports Complex, Muscat, Oman	United Arab Emirates	1–0	1–1	Friendly
14	23 February 2000	Sultan Qaboos Sports Complex, Muscat, Oman	Oman	3–0	4–0	Friendly
15	26 April 2000	Stade de France, Paris, France	France	2–0	2–3	Friendly
16	3 September 2000	Svangaskarð, Toftir, Faroe Islands	Faroe Islands	2–0	2–2	2002 FIFA World Cup qualification
