= Vladimir Kokol =

Slovenian footballer (born 1972)

Personal information
- Date of birth: 3 January 1972 (age 54)
- Place of birth: Maribor, SFR Yugoslavia
- Height: 1.71 m (5 ft 7 in)
- Position: Midfielder

Team information
- Current team: ŽNK Olimpija Ljubljana (head coach)

Senior career*
Years	Team	Apps	(Gls)
1992–1993	Železničar Maribor	32	(4)
1993–1997	Mura	110	(6)
1997–1998	Rudar Velenje	17	(0)
1998–2000	Slaven Belupo	45	(1)
2000–2001	Maribor	20	(1)
2001–2002	Mura	14	(2)
2002–2003	Olimpija	22	(2)
2003–2005	Mura	42	(1)
2005–2006	Hapoel Nazareth Illit	23	(0)
2007–2009	SV Wildon	55	(8)
2009	Mura 05	10	(0)
2010	SV Wildon	12	(0)
2010–2011	St. Margarethen/R.	19	(2)
2011	Markt Hartmannsdorf	6	(0)
2012–2014	Gančani		
2015	Čarda		
2016–2018	Rakičan	40	(0)

International career
1994–1997	Slovenia	12	(1)

Managerial career
- 2024–2026: ŽNK Mura
- 2026–: ŽNK Olimpija Ljubljana
- * Club domestic league appearances and goals

Vladimir Kokol (born 3 January 1972) is a Slovenian football manager and former player who is the manager of ŽNK Olimpija Ljubljana. He played as a midfielder.

== International career ==
Kokol made his debut for Slovenia on 12 October 1994 against Ukraine in Kyiv during the European Championship qualification. He earned a total of 12 caps, scoring 1 goal. His final international was a March 1997 friendly match against Austria.
