= Arūnas Šuika =

Lithuanian footballer and coach

Personal information
- Date of birth: 16 May 1970 (age 56)
- Place of birth: Klaipėda, Lithuanian SSR, Soviet Union
- Height: 1.74 m (5 ft 9 in)
- Position: Midfielder

Senior career*
Years	Team	Apps	(Gls)
1993–1995	ROMAR Mazeikai		
1995	Lyngby Boldklub	20	(4)
1996–1997	Silkeborg IF	15	(4)
1997–1998	Randers FC		
2000–2003	FK Atlantas		

International career
1995–2002	Lithuania	18	(3)
- * Club domestic league appearances and goals

Arūnas Šuika (born 16 May 1970) is a Lithuanian football coach and former player. A midfielder, he played several years for FK Atlantas before moving in 1995 to Denmark to play for Lyngby Boldklub. He finished his career in his all time team, FK Atlantas. Šuika made 18 appearances for the Lithuania national team between 1995 and 1997.
