= Primož Gliha =

Slovenian footballer

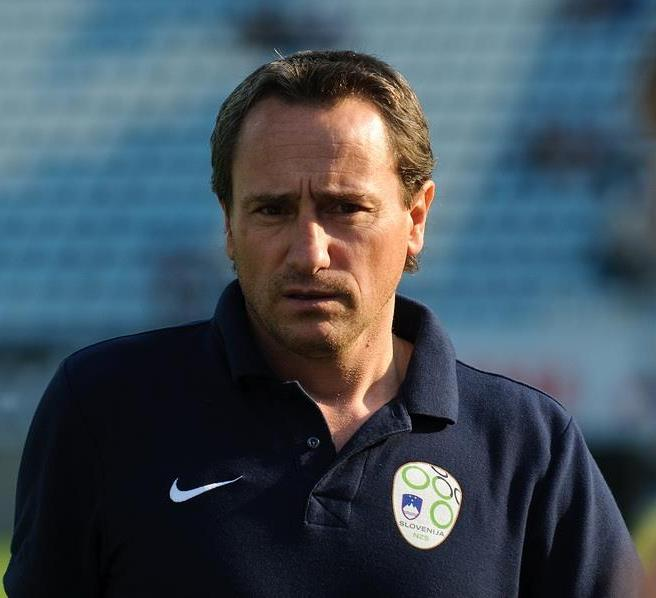
- Gliha with Slovenia U21 in 2015

Personal information
- Date of birth: 8 October 1967 (age 59)
- Place of birth: Ljubljana, SR Slovenia, Yugoslavia
- Height: 1.80 m (5 ft 11 in)
- Position: Forward

Youth career
- –1986: Olimpija Ljubljana

Senior career*
Years	Team	Apps	(Gls)
1986–1990	Olimpija Ljubljana	67	(15)
1991	Dinamo Zagreb	2	(2)
1992	Yokohama Flügels		
1993	Krka	7	(1)
1993–1994	Mura	24	(15)
1994–1995	Železničar Ljubljana	26	(13)
1995–1997	Chamois Niortais	56	(15)
1997	Slavija Vevče	6	(3)
1997–1998	Hapoel Beit She'an		
1998	Olimpija Ljubljana	7	(2)
1998–1999	Hapoel Tel Aviv		
1999–2000	Bnei Sakhnin		
2000–2001	SAK Klagenfurt	0	(0)
2001	Zalaegerszegi TE	5	(1)
2001–2002	Gorica	6	(1)
2002–2003	Zalaegerszegi TE	0	(0)
2003–2005	Ljubljana	1	(0)

International career
1992–1998	Slovenia	28	(10)

Managerial career
- 2005–2007: Olimpija Ljubljana
- 2007–2008: Drava Ptuj
- 2008–2009: Gorica
- 2009: Mura 05
- 2010–2011: Koper
- 2014: Slovenia U19
- 2015–2020: Slovenia U21
- 2021–2022: Kosovo (caretaker)
- 2023: Kosovo
- * Club domestic league appearances and goals

Primož Gliha (born 8 October 1967) is a Slovenian professional football manager and former player who played as a forward. He was most recently the manager of Kosovo national team.

== International career ==
On 3 June 1992, Gliha made his debut with Slovenia in his country's first-ever official match on 3 June 1992 against Estonia after being named in the starting line-up. On 8 February 1994, he scored his first goal for Slovenia in his third appearance in a 1–0 home win over Georgia. Gliha also scored a hat-trick on 2 April 1997 in a 3–3 draw against Croatia in the 1998 FIFA World Cup qualifications. He earned a total of 28 caps, scoring 10 goals until his final appearance in 1998.

== Managerial career ==
=== Kosovo ===
==== First term ====
On 22 February 2021, the Football Federation of Kosovo appointed Gliha as the assistant manager of the Kosovo national team.

On 19 October 2021, Gliha confirmed through an interview that he would be Kosovo's caretaker manager for the November matches against Jordan and Greece, after the previous manager Bernard Challandes was sacked. On 5 November 2021, he made his first squad announcement with Kosovo for the friendly match against Jordan and the 2022 FIFA World Cup qualification match against Greece. Five days later, Gliha had his first match as Kosovo manager in a 2–0 home defeat against Jordan.

==== Second term ====
On 4 July 2023, the Football Federation of Kosovo appointed Gliha as their manager on a five-month contract to lead the team during the UEFA Euro 2024 qualifying, after former coach Alain Giresse was sacked in June 2023.

== Personal life ==
During 1987 and 1988, Gliha was a soldier in the military service in Slatina Air Base in Kosovo within the Yugoslav People's Army. His son Erik Gliha is also a professional footballer.
