= Slovenia national football team =

Men's association football team

Slovenia
- Association: Football Association of Slovenia (NZS)
- Confederation: UEFA (Europe)
- Head coach: Boštjan Cesar
- Captain: Jan Oblak
- Most caps: Boštjan Cesar (101)
- Top scorer: Zlatko Zahovič (35)
- Home stadium: Stožice Stadium
- FIFA code: SVN
First colours	Second colours

FIFA ranking
- Current: 49 ▲3 (18 November 2026)
- Highest: 15 (October–November 2010)
- Lowest: 134 (December 1993)

First international
- Unofficial (Kingdom of Yugoslavia) Slovenia 0–5 France (Ljubljana, Kingdom of SCS; 23 June 1921); Official; Estonia 1–1 Slovenia (Tallinn, Estonia; 3 June 1992)

Biggest win
- Oman 0–7 Slovenia (Muscat, Oman; 8 February 1999)

Biggest defeat
- France 5–0 Slovenia (Saint-Denis, France; 12 October 2002)

World Cup
- Appearances: 2 (first in 2002, last in 2010)
- Best result: Group stage (2002, 2010)

European Championship
- Appearances: 2 (first in 2000)
- Best result: Round of 16 (2024)
- Website: nzs.si

The Slovenia national football team (Slovene: Slovenska nogometna reprezentanca) represents Slovenia in men's international football and is controlled by the Football Association of Slovenia, the governing body for football in Slovenia. The national squad is under the global jurisdiction of FIFA and is governed in Europe by UEFA. It competes in the three major professional tournaments available to European nations: the FIFA World Cup, UEFA Nations League and the UEFA European Championship. Slovenia played its first official match in 1992, one year after the country gained independence from Yugoslavia. The majority of Slovenia's home matches are played at Stožice Stadium in Ljubljana.

Slovenia have qualified for a major tournament four times, twice for the FIFA World Cup and twice for the UEFA European Championship. They failed to progress from the group stage of these tournaments in their first three appearances, before finally doing so at UEFA Euro 2024, when Slovenia qualified for the knockout stages by drawing all three group stage matches and being one of the best third-place teams. At the 2010 FIFA World Cup, Slovenia achieved their first (and so far only) victory in a major tournament, defeating Algeria 1–0. Other noteworthy results include a 1–0 win over Italy in 2004, which was Italy's only defeat in the entire 2006 World Cup campaign (qualifiers and the final tournament).

Boštjan Cesar holds the record for most appearances for Slovenia, having played 101 times between 2003 and 2018. Zlatko Zahovič scored 35 goals for Slovenia and is the record holder for most goals scored.

== History ==
=== Origins and pre-independence years (1921–1991) ===
Before Slovenia's independence in 1991, the national football team of Slovenia existed only as a regional team, not officially recognised by FIFA. On 23 June 1921, the Slovenian capital of Ljubljana hosted a match between France and a selection of players from Slovenian clubs. One of the guests at the match was acting FIFA president Jules Rimet, who later initiated the first FIFA World Cup tournament. The French team won the match 5–0 and, although the match was not official by international standards, it was, at least in Slovenia, generally accepted as the first appearance of the Slovenia national team. In the following decades, Slovenia played several unofficial friendly matches, including in 1956 against China, in 1968 against Austria, in 1990 against Bosnia and Herzegovina and in 1991 against Croatia.

=== Independence, first victory and first qualifiers (1992–1998) ===
In 1992, one year after Slovenia's independence from Yugoslavia, the Football Association of Slovenia was admitted to FIFA. In the same year, on 3 June, Slovenia played its first FIFA-recognised game, a friendly match against Estonia in Tallinn. The match ended in a 1–1 draw, with the first official goal for the team being scored by Igor Benedejčič. The first coach was Bojan Prašnikar. On 7 April 1993, the two teams played another friendly, and this time Slovenia achieved its first international victory by winning the match 2–0.

In 1994, managed by Zdenko Verdenik, Slovenia debuted in official competitions as the team competed in the UEFA Euro 1996 qualifiers. Slovenia played in Group 4 and finished in fifth place out of six teams, with eleven points. In the opening match of the qualifiers, Slovenia drew 1–1 at home against 1994 World Cup finalists Italy. In 1998 World Cup qualification, Slovenia was drawn with Denmark, Croatia, Greece and Bosnia and Herzegovina, finishing in last place after registering just one point in eight matches.

=== Golden generation (1998–2002) ===
==== UEFA Euro 2000 campaign ====
In July 1998, Srečko Katanec was appointed as the new manager of the team. Under his guidance, Slovenia finished the UEFA Euro 2000 qualifiers in second place, only behind Norway. Zlatko Zahovič scored eight of Slovenia's twelve goals in the qualifiers. In the additional play-offs, Slovenia faced Ukraine. The first leg was played in Ljubljana, which Slovenia won 2–1 after trailing 1–0. Zahovič scored Slovenia's first goal, and Milenko Ačimovič scored a goal from the halfway line late in the match to make the score 2–1. The second match was played in snowy conditions in Kyiv. Serhii Rebrov scored from the penalty spot in the 68th minute to give Ukraine a lead, while Slovenia equalised eight minutes later with a goal by Miran Pavlin. The 1–1 draw meant that Slovenia won 3–2 on aggregate and qualified for its first major tournament.

Slovenia's lineup for their first ever game at a major tournament, against FR Yugoslavia at UEFA Euro 2000.

At Euro 2000, Slovenia were drawn into Group C, together with Spain, FR Yugoslavia and Norway. In the first game, Slovenia played against Yugoslavia and took a 3–0 lead after one hour of play, with Zahovič scoring twice and Pavlin once. However, Yugoslavia made a comeback as they scored three goals in just six minutes for a 3–3 draw, despite playing with only ten players after Siniša Mihajlović was sent off. The second game against Spain was played in Amsterdam. Spain took a 1–0 lead with a goal by Raúl, but Slovenia equalised after one hour of play as Zahovič scored his third goal of the tournament. Just a minute later, Spain were leading again as Joseba Etxeberria scored the winning goal. In the last match of the group stage, Slovenia played against Norway and still had a chance to progress to the quarterfinals. The match finished in a goalless draw and Slovenia won its second point of the tournament, but were eliminated.

Pos	Team	Pld	W	D	L	GF	GA	GD	Pts	
1	Spain	3	2	0	1	6	5	+1	6	Advance to knockout stage
2	FR Yugoslavia	3	1	1	1	7	7	0	4	Advance to knockout stage
3	Norway	3	1	1	1	1	1	0	4	
4	Slovenia	3	0	2	1	4	5	−1	2	

Source: RSSSF

==== 2002 FIFA World Cup campaign ====
For the 2002 FIFA World Cup qualifiers, Slovenia were drawn into a group with Russia, FR Yugoslavia, Switzerland, Faroe Islands and Luxembourg. In its first five qualifying games, Slovenia won only one match (away at Luxembourg). Underdogs Faroe Islands held them to a 2–2 draw, after the Slovenes were leading 2–0 with less than five minutes remaining. In the next five matches, Slovenia won four, including a last minute victory over Russia. The team finished in second place without a single defeat and advanced to the play-off stage, where they faced Romania. Slovenia came from a goal down to win the first game 2–1 with the goals from Ačimovič in the first half and Milan Osterc in the second half. In the second leg in Bucharest, Slovenia took the lead with a goal scored by Mladen Rudonja. The final result was 1–1, and Slovenia qualified for its second consecutive major tournament and first ever World Cup.

At the World Cup, Slovenia played in Group B with Spain, Paraguay and South Africa. In the first game, Slovenia faced Spain in a Euro 2000 rematch. Spain took the lead in the first half with a goal from Raúl. Juan Carlos Valerón scored Spain's second goal with fifteen minutes remaining. A few minutes later, Sebastjan Cimirotič scored the first World Cup goal for Slovenia to cut the lead in half, before Fernando Hierro scored in the 87th minute for a 3–1 Spanish victory. The match is notable due to the conflict between manager Katanec and star player Zahovič, after which Katanec announced his retirement after the tournament, while Zahovič was expelled from the team and sent home. Slovenia lost the two remaining matches against South Africa (1–0) and Paraguay (3–1) and finished last in the group with three defeats.

Pos	Team	Pld	W	D	L	GF	GA	GD	Pts	
1	Spain	3	3	0	0	9	4	+5	9	Advance to knockout stage
2	Paraguay	3	1	1	1	6	6	0	4	Advance to knockout stage
3	South Africa	3	1	1	1	5	5	0	4	
4	Slovenia	3	0	0	3	2	7	−5	0	

Source: RSSSF

=== Decline (2003–2007) ===
After the resignation of Katanec, Prašnikar took over the team on a four-year contract. The team underwent major changes, with several key players retiring from the national team.

In the Euro 2004 qualifying campaign, Slovenia played against France, Israel, Cyprus and Malta. The team finished in second place with four wins out of eight games, however, they lost both matches against France without scoring any goals. In the play-offs, Slovenia played against its biggest rivals, Croatia. The first leg was played in Zagreb, where Croatia took the lead as Dado Pršo scored a goal in the fifth minute, while Slovenia equalised in the 22nd minute with a goal by Ermin Šiljak, for the final score of 1–1. In the second leg, Pršo scored the only goal of the game 15 minutes into the second half. Croatia qualified for Euro 2004 by winning 2–1 on aggregate, despite Šiljak scoring a total of nine goals in the whole campaign and becoming the top goalscorer of the whole Euro qualification tournament.

In May 2004, Prašnikar was replaced by Branko Oblak. Under Oblak's management, Slovenia played in the 2006 World Cup qualifiers. Grouped with Italy, Norway, Scotland, Belarus and Moldova, the team started with victories over Moldova and Italy and a draw against Scotland, but still finished in fourth place after securing only five points in the remaining seven matches. With the victory over Italy, Slovenia became the only team to beat the eventual world champions, as Italy did not lose another game during the entire campaign (qualifiers and the final tournament).

Grouped with the Netherlands, Romania, Bulgaria, Belarus, Albania and Luxembourg in Euro 2008 qualifying, the team started out with defeats to Bulgaria and Belarus, thus significantly reducing their chances to qualify, and as a result, in November 2006, Oblak was dismissed by the Football Association of Slovenia. During his two-year stint as the manager, Oblak used over forty different players.

In January 2007, Matjaž Kek was appointed as the new manager of the national team. He led Slovenia in the remainder of the Euro 2008 qualifiers, where Slovenia finished in sixth place, only above Luxembourg.

=== 2010 World Cup campaign (2008–2011) ===
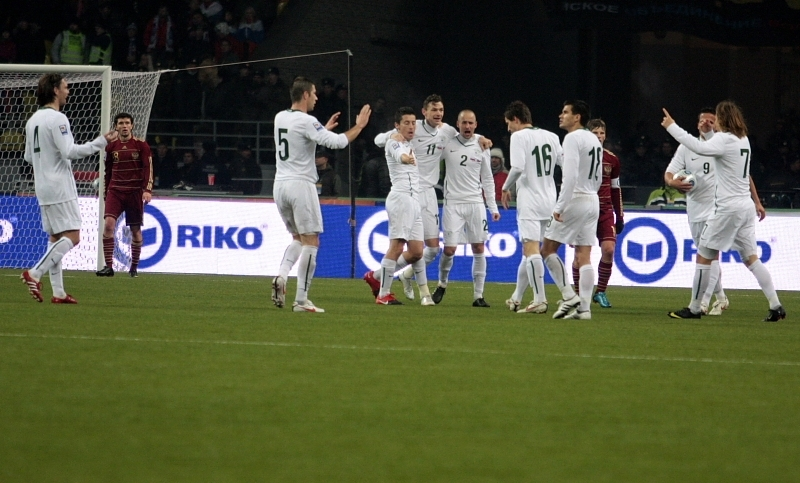
Slovenian players celebrating Nejc Pečnik's goal against Russia in the 2010 World Cup play-offs.

For the 2010 FIFA World Cup qualifiers, Slovenia were drawn into a group with the Czech Republic, Poland, Northern Ireland, Slovakia and San Marino. In its opening match, Slovenia held Poland to a 1–1 draw in Wrocław, before winning two consecutive home games against Slovakia and Northern Ireland. Slovenia then won only one point in two games against the Czech Republic and lost away to Northern Ireland, and thus fell to fifth place in the group. However, the team greatly improved its form and won the last four games without conceding a single goal. As runners-up, Slovenia qualified for the play-offs, where they were drawn against Russia. The first leg was played in Moscow. The match ended in a 2–1 win for the home side, and in the second leg, held in Maribor, Slovenia defeated Russia 1–0 with a goal by Zlatko Dedić. Slovenia advanced to the finals due to the away goals rule. The top scorer of the national team during the qualifying campaign was Milivoje Novaković with five goals.

At the World Cup, Slovenia played in Group C alongside England, Algeria and the United States. In the opening game against Algeria, Slovenia achieved its first ever World Cup win after Robert Koren scored the only goal in the match. In their second game against the United States, Slovenia were leading 2–0 at half-time with goals from Valter Birsa and Zlatan Ljubijankić, however, Landon Donovan and Michael Bradley scored in the second half for the United States. In their last match of the group stage, Slovenia lost to England 1–0 with a goal by Jermain Defoe. As the United States defeated Algeria with a late goal, Slovenia dropped to third place and were eliminated from the tournament.

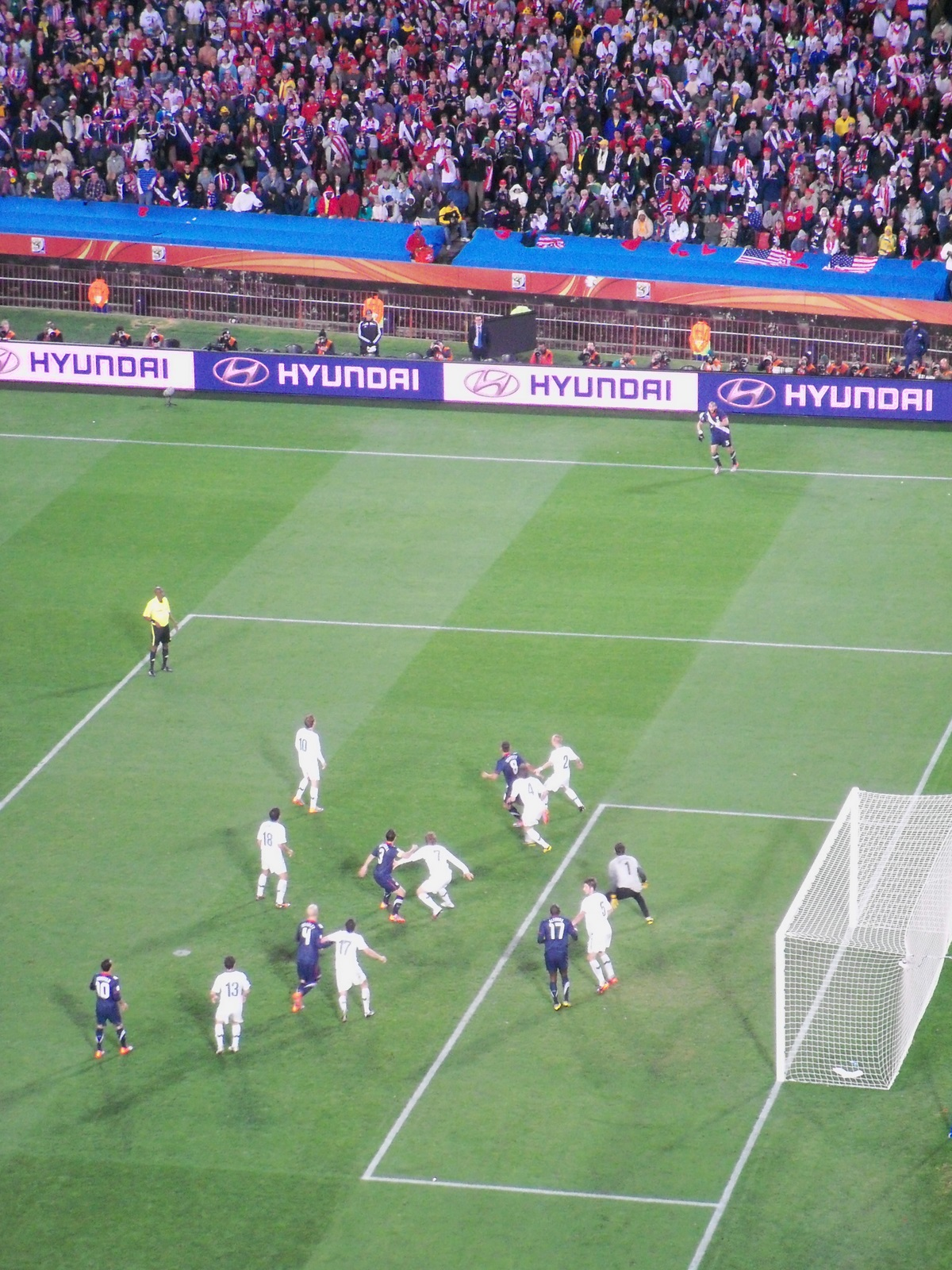
Slovenia vs. United States at the 2010 World Cup

After the 2010 World Cup, Slovenia achieved their highest ever position in the FIFA World Rankings, as the team was ranked 15th in October 2010. However, Slovenia started the UEFA Euro 2012 qualifiers with an unexpected home defeat against Northern Ireland. Two defeats against Italy and a home defeat against Estonia meant that Slovenia finished only in fourth place in the group, behind Italy, Estonia and Serbia.

=== Katanec's second spell and management changes (2011–2018) ===
In October 2011, the Football Association of Slovenia appointed Slaviša Stojanović as the new manager. He led the team in only nine matches, including the first four matches of the 2014 FIFA World Cup qualifiers, where Slovenia recorded one victory and three defeats. He was sacked by the end of 2012 and was replaced by Katanec, who had previously led the team between 1998 and 2002. Under his leadership, Slovenia lost at home to Iceland, before winning four consecutive games to finish third in the group, two points behind Iceland.

In the qualifiers for UEFA Euro 2016, Slovenia came close to directly qualifying for the tournament for the first time. The team lost a decisive game away to Switzerland. Slovenia led 2–0 with less than 15 minutes remaining, but the Swiss then scored three times to win 3–2. As the third-placed team, Slovenia advanced to the play-offs, where they were eliminated by Ukraine 3–1 on aggregate. The qualifiers for the 2018 World Cup were similar, as Slovenia narrowly lost two decisive away matches against Slovakia and England. After the defeat at Wembley Stadium, where Harry Kane scored the only goal of the match in the 94th minute, Katanec announced his resignation as the manager. In December 2017, Tomaž Kavčič became the new manager.

In 2018, Slovenia competed in the inaugural edition of the UEFA Nations League. In accordance with the FIFA World Rankings, the team competed in the third-tier League C along with Bulgaria, Cyprus and Norway. After the poor run of results, in which Slovenia obtained only one point in the first four matches, Kavčič was sacked. He became the manager with the shortest tenure in Slovenian history, leading the team in only seven games. As Slovenia finished last in the group, they were relegated to the bottom tier League D, but UEFA changed the system for the next edition and the team remained in League C.

=== Kek's second spell, Nations League promotion, and Euro 2024 (2019–2025) ===
Kek was appointed as the manager for the second time in November 2018. Slovenia failed to make a breakthrough during the UEFA Euro 2020 qualifiers, losing both games against Austria and obtaining only one point against North Macedonia. Despite the unexpected 2–0 home victory against Poland, Slovenia finished fourth in the group. However, in the 2020–21 UEFA Nations League C, Slovenia remained undefeated in all six games against Greece, Moldova and Kosovo. Under the leadership of team captain Jan Oblak, Slovenia held Greece to a 0–0 draw in both matches and also obtained all twelve available points against Moldova and Kosovo, thus securing first place in the group and promotion to League B for the 2022–23 edition. In the 2022 World Cup qualifiers, Slovenia once again failed to qualify for the main event; they started the campaign with a 1–0 home victory against Croatia with a goal by Sandi Lovrić, which was Slovenia's first victory over their neighbours after failing to beat them in the previous eight official matches. After two narrow defeats against Russia and a surprising defeat to Cyprus, Slovenia finished fourth in the group with four wins in ten matches, behind Croatia, Russia and Slovakia.

In 2022, Slovenia made their maiden appearance in League B of the Nations League, and avoided relegation after finishing third in a group with Serbia, Norway and Sweden. Benjamin Šeško scored three of Slovenia's six goals in the competition, including a goal in the decisive 1–1 away draw to Sweden that secured a crucial point on the last matchday.

In the UEFA Euro 2024 qualifiers, Slovenia finally ended its major tournament drought and qualified for the Euro finals for the first time in 24 years. Šeško was once again one of the key players, scoring five goals in nine appearances, including a goal in the decisive home game against Kazakhstan on the final matchday, which Slovenia won 2–1 in front of 16,432 spectators, a record home attendance for the Slovenia national team. The team finished the qualifiers in second place, behind only Denmark, with a record tally of 22 points from 10 games. In addition, it was also the first time that Slovenia directly qualified for a major tournament without having to play an additional play-off.

At the Euro finals in Germany, Slovenia advanced from the group stage for the first time at a major tournament after drawing all three matches in their group against Denmark, Serbia and England, before being eliminated in the round of 16 on penalties by Portugal, finishing the tournament undefeated after regular time.

After the 2026 FIFA World Cup qualifiers, where Slovenia failed to win a single match for the first time since the 1998 World Cup qualifying campaign, Kek left the team after his managerial contract expired. In January 2026, he was replaced by Boštjan Cesar, former captain of the national team, the player with the most appearances for Slovenia, and former assistant to Kek.

== Team image ==
=== Nickname and mascot ===
The Slovenia national team does not have an official nickname and was the only team at the 2010 World Cup and the 2024 European Championship without one. During the 2010 World Cup qualifiers, Slovenian journalists and the Football Association of Slovenia tried to choose a nickname for the team, but the process failed to gain the support of fans. In 2010, the Slovenian web portal Siol organized a fan vote and the nickname "Kekci", a reference to the Slovenian fictional child character Kekec and the then national team manager Matjaž Kek, finished in first place. However, the nickname was never officially adopted by the Football Association of Slovenia. "Kekci" is still occasionally used by the Slovenian media when referring to the national team.

During the 2010 World Cup, some foreign media articles used the nickname "Zmajčeki" (English: Little Dragons) when referring to the Slovenian national team, however, this was the old nickname of Slovenian club Olimpija Ljubljana when they competed in the Yugoslav football system. Because Olimpija had a long tradition in the former Yugoslav First League, football fans and the media in the countries of the former Yugoslavia still use this nickname today when referring to the Slovenian team.

In 2002, Slovenia received an official mascot for its appearance at the 2002 World Cup. The mascot, called Trigi, is based on a round shape representing the Earth or a ball, with a stylized depiction of Triglav, the highest Slovenian mountain, on its head in a green, white and blue colour combination.

=== Kits and colours ===
Until 1993, Slovenia played its matches in white, blue and red, which are the traditional colours of the country. In 1993, the board of the Football Association of Slovenia decided to change the main colours to green and white, inspired by NK Olimpija from the capital city of Ljubljana.

In December 2009, the board voted to change the kit's colours to white for home matches and blue for away matches. The new colours came into effect in April 2012, when a new all-white home kit with a blue and green trim was unveiled. The new away kit, introduced a couple of months earlier, was all-blue with a white and green trim. In 2016, the all-green version returned as an away kit, while the light blue kit became the new home kit. In 2022, the new Slovenian kits were selected through an online fan vote for the first time. The home colours were again changed to all-white and the away colours to all-blue.

For their World Cup appearances in 2002 and 2010, the Slovenian kit featured a stylized depiction of Triglav. Since 2010, the depiction has been used on each new kit set.

Slovenia's first kit was white, blue and red, inspired by the Slovenian flag.
In the first half of the 1990s, green first appeared on Slovenia's kits.
All-white home kit in 2012, with a prominent depiction of Triglav.

==== Kit suppliers ====
Nike has been the team's kit provider since 2007. Previously, the kit providers were Puma, Adidas, Uhlsport, and Kappa.

Kit provider	Period
Puma	1993–1996
Adidas	1997–2001
Uhlsport	2002–2003
Kappa	2003–2006
Nike	2007–present

=== Home stadium ===
Slovenia's home matches have been held at ten venues in eight cities. Since 2010, most matches have been played in Ljubljana at the Stožice Stadium, with a seating capacity of 16,038. The final training sessions and physical preparation of the team before domestic matches are held at the National Football Centre Brdo in Predoslje.

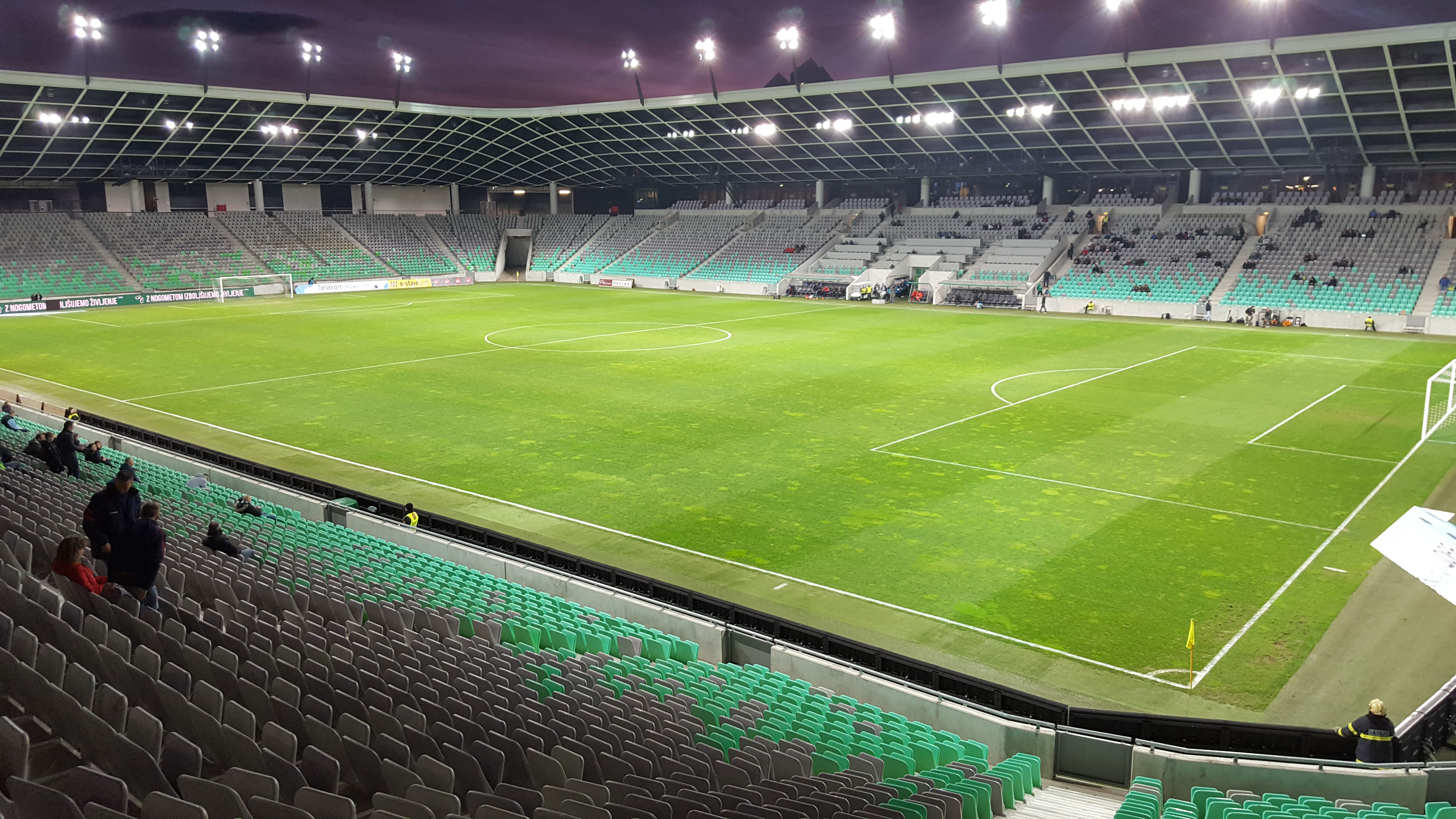
Stožice Stadium, the main stadium of the Slovenia national team

The first home stadium of Slovenia was the Bežigrad Stadium, located in the Bežigrad District in Ljubljana. It was the main stadium of the national team until 2004, when UEFA banned it due to insufficient infrastructure. In the same year, the newly built Arena Petrol in Celje became the new main venue of the team for the next three years. For the 2010 World Cup qualifiers, Slovenia moved to the recently renovated Ljudski vrt stadium in Maribor, where the team remained undefeated in their six home matches during the qualifying campaign (five wins and a draw), consequently qualifying for the main tournament. Stožice were built in 2010, and since then the venue has hosted most of the national team's home matches. The venue also holds the record for the highest home attendance of the Slovenia national team, as 16,432 spectators gathered for the final match of the UEFA Euro 2024 qualifiers against Kazakhstan on 20 November 2023, which saw Slovenia qualify for the Euros. The attendance record was later equaled in March 2024, when Slovenia defeated Portugal in a friendly match, ending their eleven-game winning streak.

Other venues where Slovenia played at least one home match are the Bonifika Stadium in Koper, Fazanerija City Stadium in Murska Sobota, Domžale Sports Park in Domžale, Nova Gorica Sports Park in Nova Gorica, Stanko Mlakar Stadium in Kranj, and ŽŠD Ljubljana Stadium in Ljubljana.

=== Rivalries ===
Slovenia's main football rivals are its neighbours Croatia. The matchup between the two sides is known as the Neighbourhood derby (Slovene: Sosedski derbi, Croatian: Susjedski derbi). As of June 2026, they have faced each other thirteen times (twelve official matches and one unofficial match). One of the most notable matches between Slovenia and Croatia took place in 2003, where the two teams met in the qualifying playoffs for UEFA Euro 2004. After a 1–1 draw in the first match in Zagreb, Slovenia then lost 1–0 at home and failed to qualify for its third consecutive major tournament. In March 2021, Slovenia finally managed to win a game against Croatia after failing to do so in the previous nine matches, as they won 1–0 at home during the 2022 FIFA World Cup qualifiers.

== Results and fixtures ==
The following is a list of match results in the last 12 months, as well as any future matches that have been scheduled.

Win Draw Loss Fixture

=== 2026 ===
28 March Friendly	Hungary	1–0	Slovenia	Budapest, Hungary
18:00 UTC+1	Schön 79'	Report		Stadium: Puskás Aréna; Attendance: 50,252; Referee: Rohit Saggi (Norway)

31 March Friendly	Montenegro	2–3	Slovenia	Podgorica, Montenegro
18:00 UTC+2	Osmajić 20', 44'	Report	Vipotnik 41', 55'; Šturm 47'	Stadium: Podgorica City Stadium; Attendance: 3,000; Referee: Duje Strukan (Croatia)

4 June Friendly	Slovenia	1–1	Cyprus	Ljubljana, Slovenia
18:00 UTC+2	Drkušić 65'	Report	Tzionis 7'	Stadium: Stožice Stadium; Attendance: 9,023; Referee: Patrik Kolarić (Croatia)

7 June Friendly	Croatia	2–1	Slovenia	Varaždin, Croatia
20:45 UTC+2	Modrić 51'; Pašalić 90+3'	Report	Šporar 83'	Stadium: Stadion Varteks; Attendance: 7,032; Referee: Bence Csonka (Hungary)

26 September 2026–27 UEFA Nations League B	Slovenia	0–0	Scotland	Ljubljana, Slovenia
15:00 UTC+2		Report		Stadium: Stožice Stadium; Attendance: 12,182; Referee: Horațiu Feșnic (Romania)

29 September 2026–27 UEFA Nations League B	Slovenia	2–0	North Macedonia	Ljubljana, Slovenia
20:45 UTC+2	Lovrić 55'; Matko 82'	Report		Stadium: Stožice Stadium; Attendance: 10,246; Referee: Andrea Colombo (Italy)

3 October 2026–27 UEFA Nations League B	Switzerland	2–1	Slovenia	Lucerne, Switzerland
20:45 UTC+2	Janža 10' (o.g.); Ndoye 38'	Report	Vipotnik 2'	Stadium: Thermoplan Arena; Attendance: 15,240; Referee: Ivan Kružliak (Slovakia)

6 October 2026–27 UEFA Nations League B	Scotland	1–2	Slovenia	Glasgow, Scotland
19:45 UTC+1	Christie 31'	Report	Matko 56'; Šturm 71'	Stadium: Hampden Park; Attendance: 34,466; Referee: José María Sánchez Martínez (Spain)

13 November 2026–27 UEFA Nations League B	Slovenia	0–0	Switzerland	Maribor, Slovenia
20:45 UTC+1		Report		Stadium: Ljudski vrt Attendance: 10,500; Referee: Jasper Vergoote (Belgium)

16 November 2026–27 UEFA Nations League B	North Macedonia	0–3	Slovenia	Skopje, North Macedonia
20:45 UTC+1		Report	Šturm 29', 90+1'; Zec 66'	Stadium: Toše Proeski Arena; Attendance: 1,875; Referee: Serdar Gözübüyük (Netherlands)

=== 2027 ===
27 March 2026–27 UEFA Nations League promotion/relegation play-offs	Slovenia	v	Wales	Slovenia
20:45 UTC+1

30 March 2026–27 UEFA Nations League promotion/relegation play-offs	Wales	v	Slovenia	Wales
19:45 UTC+1

== Coaching staff ==
=== Current coaching staff ===
Name	Role
Boštjan Cesar	Manager
Bojan Jokić	Assistant manager
Milivoje Novaković	Assistant manager
Aleksandar Radosavljević	Assistant manager
Borut Mavrič	Goalkeeping coach
Srđan Prodanović	Fitness coach
Tadej Pirtovšek	Analyst

=== Manager history ===
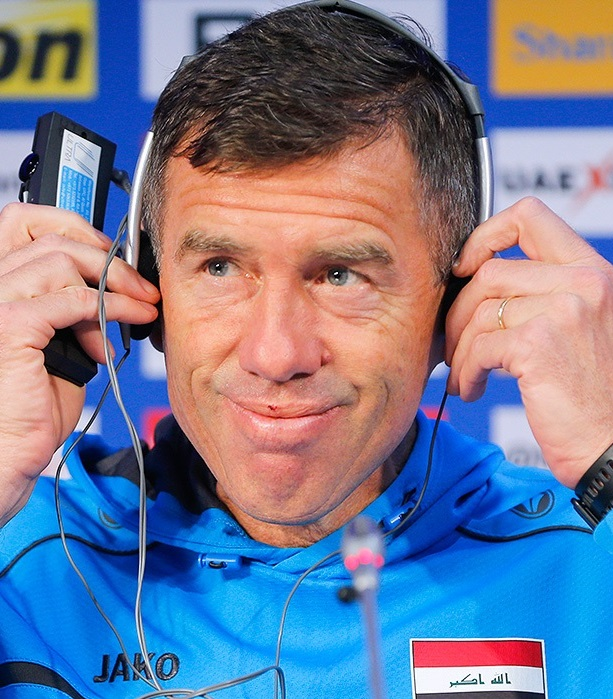
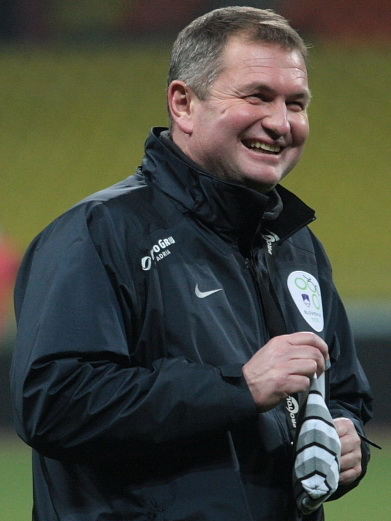
Katanec (left) and Kek (right) managed Slovenia at the FIFA World Cup in 2002 and 2010, respectively.

Since 1991, nine managers have been in charge of the national team. Bojan Prašnikar, Srečko Katanec and Matjaž Kek are the only three managers with more than one spell.

Tomaž Kavčič is the manager with the shortest tenure, as he managed only seven games in 2018 before being sacked. He was replaced by Igor Benedejčič, who became the first manager to be appointed as a caretaker.

Statistics updated as of 16 November 2026, after the match against North Macedonia.

Manager	Tenure	Played	Won	Drawn	Lost	Win %	Major tournaments	Ref.
Bojan Prašnikar	1991–1993	4	1	2	1	25.00		
Zdenko Verdenik	1994–1997	32	10	8	14	31.25		
Bojan Prašnikar	1998	5	1	1	3	20.00		
Srečko Katanec	1998–2002	47	18	16	13	38.30	Euro 2000 – Group stage 2002 World Cup – Group stage	
Bojan Prašnikar	2002–2004	16	6	3	7	37.50		
Branko Oblak	2004–2006	23	6	7	10	26.09		
Matjaž Kek	2007–2011	49	20	9	20	40.82	2010 World Cup – Group stage	
Slaviša Stojanović	2011–2012	9	2	2	5	22.22		
Srečko Katanec	2013–2017	42	16	7	19	38.10		
Tomaž Kavčič	2017–2018	7	1	1	5	14.29		
Igor Benedejčič	2018	2	0	2	0	0.00		
Matjaž Kek	2018–2025	75	32	27	16	42.67	Euro 2024 – Round of 16	
Boštjan Cesar	2026–present	10	4	3	3	40.00		

== Players ==
=== Current squad ===
The following players were called up for the 2026–27 UEFA Nations League matches against Switzerland and North Macedonia on 13 and 16 November 2026, respectively.
Caps and goals are correct as of 16 November 2026, after the match against North Macedonia.

No.	Pos.	Player	Date of birth (age)	Caps	Goals	Club
1	GK	Jan Oblak (captain)	7 January 1993 (age 33)	90	0	(Royal Spanish Football Federation) Atlético Madrid
12	GK	Matevž Vidovšek	30 October 1999 (age 27)	2	0	(Football Association of Slovenia) Olimpija Ljubljana
16	GK	Igor Vekić	6 May 1998 (age 28)	5	0	(Croatian Football Federation) Rijeka
2	DF	Žan Karničnik	18 September 1994 (age 32)	54	2	(Football Association of Slovenia) Maribor
3	DF	Relja Obrić	11 April 2006 (age 20)	1	0	(Italian Football Federation) Atalanta
4	DF	Žan Zaletel	16 September 1999 (age 27)	4	0	(Danish Football Association) Viborg
5	DF	Srđan Kuzmić	16 January 2004 (age 22)	6	0	(French Football Federation) Lorient
13	DF	Erik Janža	21 June 1993 (age 33)	37	3	(Polish Football Association) Górnik Zabrze
17	DF	David Zec	5 January 2000 (age 26)	10	1	(German Football Association) Holstein Kiel
21	DF	Vanja Drkušić	30 October 1999 (age 27)	35	1	(Royal Spanish Football Federation) Espanyol
23	DF	Jošt Urbančič	12 April 2001 (age 25)	2	0	(Football Association of Slovenia) Olimpija Ljubljana
	DF	David Brekalo	3 December 1998 (age 27)	32	1	(United States Soccer Federation) Orlando City
6	MF	Adrian Zeljković	19 August 2002 (age 24)	4	0	(Hungarian Football Federation) MTK Budapest
7	MF	Benjamin Verbič	27 November 1993 (age 32)	67	7	(Football Association of Slovenia) Celje
8	MF	Sandi Lovrić	28 March 1998 (age 28)	50	6	(Italian Football Federation) Udinese
10	MF	Mark Zabukovnik	27 December 2000 (age 25)	9	0	(Football Association of Slovenia) Celje
14	MF	Tjaš Begić	30 June 2003 (age 23)	6	0	(Italian Football Federation) Sampdoria
19	MF	Tomi Horvat	24 March 1999 (age 27)	15	0	(The Football Association) Bristol City
22	MF	Adam Gnezda Čerin	16 July 1999 (age 27)	57	6	(United Arab Emirates Football Association) Al Wahda
9	FW	Andraž Šporar	27 February 1994 (age 32)	70	13	(Slovak Football Association) Slovan Bratislava
11	FW	Žan Celar	14 March 1999 (age 27)	21	0	(Swiss Football Association) Basel
15	FW	Danijel Šturm	4 January 1999 (age 27)	16	4	(Football Association of the Czech Republic) Slavia Prague
18	FW	Žan Vipotnik	18 March 2002 (age 24)	32	6	(Football Association of Wales) Swansea City
20	FW	Aljoša Matko	29 March 2000 (age 26)	11	2	(Hungarian Football Federation) Újpest

=== Recent call-ups ===
The following players have also been called up to the Slovenia squad within the last twelve months.

Pos.	Player	Date of birth (age)	Caps	Goals	Club	Latest call-up
GK	Žan-Luk Leban	15 December 2002 (age 23)	0	0	(Slovenia) Celje	v. Scotland, 6 October 2026
DF	Jaka Bijol	5 February 1999 (age 27)	78	1	(England) Leeds United	v. Switzerland, 13 November 2026 ^{SUS}
DF	Jure Balkovec	9 September 1994 (age 32)	40	0	(Cyprus) Omonia	v. Scotland, 6 October 2026
DF	Marcel Ratnik	23 December 2003 (age 22)	4	0	(United Arab Emirates) Al Ain	v. Croatia, 7 June 2026
MF	Timi Max Elšnik	29 April 1998 (age 28)	38	2	(Serbia) Red Star Belgrade	v. Switzerland, 13 November 2026 ^{INJ}
MF	Tamar Svetlin	30 July 2001 (age 25)	7	1	(France) Saint-Étienne	v. Scotland, 6 October 2026
MF	Svit Sešlar	9 January 2002 (age 24)	7	0	(Slovenia) Celje	v. Croatia, 7 June 2026
MF	Tian Nai Koren	31 July 2009 (age 17)	1	0	(Belgium) Club Brugge	v. Croatia, 7 June 2026
MF	Petar Stojanović	7 October 1995 (age 31)	73	2	(Slovenia) Maribor	v. Cyprus, 4 June 2026 ^{INJ}
MF	Jon Gorenc Stanković	14 January 1996 (age 30)	33	1	(Austria) Sturm Graz	v. Montenegro, 31 March 2026
FW	Benjamin Šeško	31 May 2003 (age 23)	45	16	(England) Manchester United	v. Scotland, 26 September 2026 ^{INJ}
FW	Nik Prelec	10 June 2001 (age 25)	0	0	(Poland) Jagiellonia Białystok	v. Scotland, 26 September 2026 ^{INJ}
FW	Ester Sokler	4 June 1999 (age 27)	1	0	(Israel) Maccabi Tel Aviv	v. Croatia, 7 June 2026
Notes: ^{INJ} = Withdrew due to injury; ^{SUS} = Serving suspension

== Individual records ==
As of 16 November 2026
Players in bold are still active with Slovenia.

244 players have made at least one official appearance for the Slovenia national team. With 101 caps, Boštjan Cesar has the most appearances for Slovenia; he also had the longest career as a Slovenian international footballer with 15 years, 1 month and 15 days. Goalkeeper Jan Oblak started the most matches as the team captain (66), while Zlatko Zahovič is the highest-scoring player with 35 goals. Sašo Udovič scored the most goals in a single match, scoring five against Iceland in 1996.

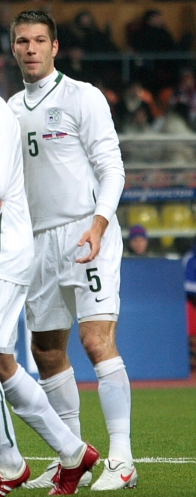
Defender Boštjan Cesar is Slovenia's most capped player with 101 appearances.

Most appearances
Rank	Player	Caps	Goals	Career
1	Boštjan Cesar	101	10	2003–2018
2	Bojan Jokić	100	1	2006–2019
3	Jasmin Kurtić	96	2	2012–2024
4	Valter Birsa	90	7	2006–2018
4	**Jan Oblak**	90	0	2012–present
6	Josip Iličić	86	17	2010–2024
7	Samir Handanović	81	0	2004–2015
8	Milivoje Novaković	80	32	2006–2017
8	Zlatko Zahovič	80	35	1992–2004
10	**Jaka Bijol**	78	1	2018–present

Top goalscorers
Rank	Player	Goals	Caps	Ratio	Career
1	Zlatko Zahovič	35	80	0.44	1992–2004
2	Milivoje Novaković	32	80	0.4	2006–2017
3	Josip Iličić	17	86	0.2	2010–2024
4	Sašo Udovič	16	42	0.38	1993–2000
4	**Benjamin Šeško**	16	45	0.36	2021–present
6	Ermin Šiljak	14	48	0.29	1994–2005
7	**Andraž Šporar**	13	70	0.19	2016–present
7	Milenko Ačimovič	13	74	0.18	1998–2007
9	Tim Matavž	11	39	0.28	2010–2020
10	Primož Gliha	10	28	0.36	1992–1998
10	Boštjan Cesar	10	101	0.1	2003–2018

== Team records ==
- Biggest victory: 7–0 vs. Oman, 8 February 1999
- Heaviest defeat: 0–5 vs. France, 12 October 2002
- Most consecutive victories: 4
  - From 5 June 1999 against Latvia to 4 September 1999 against Georgia
  - From 18 November 2009 against Russia to 13 June 2010 against Algeria
  - From 6 September 2020 against Moldova to 14 October 2020 against Moldova
  - From 17 November 2022 against Romania to 26 March 2023 against San Marino
  - From 7 September 2023 against Northern Ireland to 17 October 2023 against Northern Ireland
- Most consecutive matches without defeat: 12, from 20 November 2023 against Kazakhstan to 9 September 2024 against Kazakhstan
- Most consecutive defeats: 4 (achieved on five occasions, most recently in 2014)
- Most consecutive matches without victory: 9, from 6 September 2018 against Bulgaria to 7 June 2019 against Austria
- Most consecutive matches without scoring: 4
  - From 13 October 2004 against Norway to 26 March 2005 against Germany
  - From 5 March 2014 against Algeria to 8 September 2014 against Estonia
  - From 8 September 2025 against Switzerland to 15 November 2025 against Kosovo
- Most consecutive matches without conceding a goal: 6, from 3 September 2020 against Greece to 11 November 2020 against Azerbaijan
- Most consecutive matches scoring: 14, from 19 June 2023 against Denmark to 20 June 2024 against Serbia

== Competitive record ==
=== FIFA World Cup ===
FIFA World Cup record									Qualification record						
Year	Round	Pld	W	D	L	GF	GA	Squad	Pos.	Pld	W	D	L	GF	GA
1930 to 1990	Part of Yugoslavia								Part of Yugoslavia						
(United States) 1994	Did not enter								Did not enter						
(France) 1998	Did not qualify								5th	8	0	1	7	5	20
(South Korea) (Japan) 2002	Group stage	3	0	0	3	2	7	Squad	2nd (PO)	12	6	6	0	20	11
(Germany) 2006	Did not qualify								4th	10	3	3	4	10	13
(South Africa) 2010	Group stage	3	1	1	1	3	3	Squad	2nd (PO)	12	7	2	3	20	6
(Brazil) 2014	Did not qualify								3rd	10	5	0	5	14	11
(Russia) 2018	Did not qualify								4th	10	4	3	3	12	7
(Qatar) 2022	Did not qualify								4th	10	4	2	4	13	12
(Canada) (Mexico) (United States) 2026	Did not qualify								3rd	6	0	4	2	3	8
(Morocco) (Portugal) (Spain) 2030	To be determined								To be determined						
(Saudi Arabia) 2034	To be determined								To be determined						
Total	Group stage	6	1	1	4	5	10	—	2/8	78	29	21	28	97	88

=== UEFA European Championship ===
UEFA European Championship record									Qualification record						
Year	Round	Pld	W	D	L	GF	GA	Squad	Pos.	Pld	W	D	L	GF	GA
1960 to 1992	Part of Yugoslavia								Part of Yugoslavia						
(England) 1996	Did not qualify								5th	10	3	2	5	13	13
(Belgium) (Netherlands) 2000	Group stage	3	0	2	1	4	5	Squad	2nd (PO)	12	6	3	3	15	16
(Portugal) 2004	Did not qualify								2nd (PO)	10	4	3	3	16	14
(Austria) (Switzerland) 2008	Did not qualify								6th	12	3	2	7	9	16
(Poland) (Ukraine) 2012	Did not qualify								4th	10	4	2	4	11	7
(France) 2016	Did not qualify								3rd (PO)	12	5	2	5	19	14
(Europe) 2020	Did not qualify								4th	10	4	2	4	16	11
(Germany) 2024	Round of 16	4	0	4	0	2	2	Squad	2nd	10	7	1	2	20	9
(England) (Republic of Ireland) (Scotland) (Wales) 2028	To be determined								To be determined						
(Italy) (Turkey) 2032	To be determined								To be determined						
Total	Round of 16	7	0	6	1	6	7	—	2/8	86	36	17	33	119	100

=== UEFA Nations League ===
UEFA Nations League record
Season	League	Group	Round	Pos	Pld	W	D	L	GF	GA	P/R	RK
2018–19	C	3	League phase	4th	6	0	3	3	5	8	Same position	38th
2020–21	C	3	League phase	1st	6	4	2	0	8	1	▲	33rd
2022–23	B	4	League phase	3rd	6	1	3	2	6	10	Same position	25th
2024–25	B	3	League phase	3rd	6	2	2	2	7	9	Same position	25th (Note: Interim overall ranking after the league phase)
2024–25	Relegation play-off				2	1	1	0	1	0	Same position	25th (Note: Final overall ranking after the knockout stage and promotion/relegation play-offs)
2026–27	B	1	League phase	2nd	6	3	2	1	8	3	TBD	21st
2026–27	Promotion play-off										TBD	TBD
Total					32	11	13	8	35	31	21st	

Key and notes

- ▲ = Promoted to the higher division
- = Remained in the same division

== Head-to-head record ==
The following table shows Slovenia's all-time international record, correct as of 16 November 2026 after the match against North Macedonia.

Team	Pld	W	D	L	GF	GA	GD
Albania	7	4	2	1	6	2	+4
Algeria	2	1	0	1	1	2	−1
Argentina	1	0	0	1	0	2	−2
Armenia	1	1	0	0	2	1	+1
Australia	1	1	0	0	2	0	+2
Austria	6	1	2	3	4	7	–3
Azerbaijan	1	0	1	0	0	0	0
Belarus	5	1	2	2	5	8	−3
Belgium	2	0	1	1	0	2	−2
Bosnia and Herzegovina	5	1	0	4	6	11	−5
Bulgaria	5	0	2	3	3	9	−6
Canada	1	1	0	0	1	0	+1
China	1	0	1	0	0	0	0
Colombia	1	0	0	1	0	1	−1
Croatia	12	1	4	7	11	21	–10
Cyprus	13	6	4	3	20	12	+8
Czech Republic	5	1	1	3	2	7	−5
Denmark	7	0	2	5	4	15	−11
England	7	0	2	5	4	10	−6
Estonia	9	6	1	2	13	5	+8
Faroe Islands	4	3	1	0	12	3	+9
Finland	4	1	1	2	4	5	−1
France	3	0	0	3	2	10	−8
Georgia	4	2	1	1	5	4	+1
Germany	1	0	0	1	0	1	−1
Ghana	1	1	0	0	2	0	+2
Gibraltar	1	1	0	0	6	0	+6
Greece	7	0	4	3	3	11	−8
Honduras	1	0	0	1	1	5	−4
Hungary	5	3	0	2	5	4	+1
Iceland	4	3	0	1	15	7	+8
Israel	5	2	3	0	8	5	+3
Italy	7	2	1	4	3	5	−2
Ivory Coast	1	0	0	1	0	3	−3
Kazakhstan	4	4	0	0	8	2	+6
Kosovo	4	2	1	1	3	3	0
Latvia	5	4	0	1	9	2	+7
Lithuania	6	2	2	2	11	7	+4
Luxembourg	5	5	0	0	10	1	+9
Malta	9	7	2	0	17	3	+14
Mexico	1	1	0	0	2	1	+1
Moldova	4	4	0	0	10	1	+9
Montenegro	4	3	1	0	7	3	+4
Netherlands	2	0	0	2	0	3	−3
New Zealand	1	1	0	0	3	1	+2
North Macedonia	9	3	2	4	12	13	−1
Northern Ireland	7	3	1	3	7	5	+2
Norway	13	2	3	8	11	24	−13
Oman	2	2	0	0	11	0	+11
Paraguay	1	0	0	1	1	3	−2
Poland	8	2	3	3	9	9	0
Portugal	2	1	1	0	2	0	+2
Qatar	3	1	1	1	4	2	+2
Romania	9	3	3	3	12	14	−2
Russia	7	2	1	4	8	11	−3
San Marino	7	7	0	0	26	0	+26
Saudi Arabia	1	1	0	0	2	0	+2
Scotland	7	1	4	2	5	8	−3
Serbia (Note: Includes matches against FR Yugoslavia and Serbia and Montenegro.)	9	1	7	1	12	14	−2
Slovakia	10	4	5	1	10	6	+4
South Africa	1	0	0	1	0	1	−1
Spain	2	0	0	2	2	5	−3
Sweden	6	0	4	2	4	7	−3
Switzerland	13	2	3	8	9	22	−13
Trinidad and Tobago	1	1	0	0	3	1	+2
Tunisia	2	1	1	0	3	2	+1
Turkey	2	1	0	1	2	1	+1
Ukraine	6	2	3	1	7	7	0
United Arab Emirates	2	0	2	0	3	3	0
United States	3	1	1	1	5	5	0
Uruguay	2	0	0	2	0	4	−4
Wales	1	0	1	0	0	0	0
Total	321	117	88	116	400	372	+28

== Honours ==
=== Friendly ===
- Rothmans International Tournament
  - Winners: 1994
  - Runners-up: 1996
- Cyprus International Tournament
  - Runners-up: 1998, 2006
- Oman International Tournament
  - Runners-up: 1999, 2000
- Carlsberg Cup
  - Third place: 2002

=== Awards ===
- FIFA Best Mover of the Year: 1999

== See also ==
- Slovenia national football B team
- Slovenia national under-21 football team
- Slovenia national under-19 football team
- Slovenia national under-17 football team
- Sport in Slovenia
