= Bežigrad Stadium =

Sports venue in Ljubljana, Slovenia

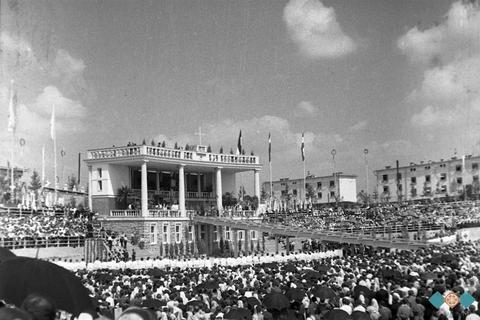
- Bežigrad Stadium in 1935
- Interactive map of Bežigrad Stadium
- Full name: Bežigrad Central Stadium
- Location: Bežigrad, Ljubljana, Slovenia
- Coordinates: 46°4′8.84″N 14°30′30.60″E

Construction
- Built: 1935
- Closed: 2008
- Architect: Jože Plečnik

Tenants
- NK Olimpija Ljubljana (1945–2005); NK Factor (2004–2005); NK Bežigrad (2005–2007); Slovenia national football team (1995–2004)

Bežigrad Stadium (Slovene: Bežigrajski stadion, stadion Bežigrad, stadion za Bežigradom), also known as Bežigrad Central Stadium (Slovene: Centralni stadion Bežigrad), is a multi-purpose stadium in Ljubljana, the capital city of Slovenia. It is the oldest stadium in Ljubljana. The stadium has been closed since 2008.

Construction of Bežigrad Stadium for the Roman Catholic youth sport association Orel began in 1925. It was designed by the architect Jože Plečnik. It takes its name from the Bežigrad district in Ljubljana, where it is located.

After World War II, the stadium was predominantly used for football matches, and was the home of the football club NK Olimpija Ljubljana until the club's dissolution in 2005. The newly established club, NK Bežigrad, played at the stadium between 2005 and 2007.

== National team matches ==
Between 1995 and 2004, Slovenia national football team played 27 matches at the venue.

| Date | Competition | Country | Result | Attendance |
|---|---|---|---|---|
| 11 October 1995 | UEFA Euro 1996 Q | Ukraine | 3–2 | 2,750 |
| 15 November 1995 | UEFA Euro 1996 Q | Croatia | 1–2 | 6,800 |
| 21 May 1995 | Friendly | United Arab Emirates | 2–2 | 2,500 |
| 1 September 1996 | 1998 FIFA World Cup Q | Denmark | 0–2 | 5,000 |
| 10 November 1996 | 1998 FIFA World Cup Q | Bosnia and Herzegovina | 1–2 | 3,200 |
| 6 September 1997 | 1998 FIFA World Cup Q | Greece | 0–3 | 4,689 |
| 11 October 1997 | 1998 FIFA World Cup Q | Croatia | 1–3 | 6,000 |
| 10 October 1998 | UEFA Euro 2000 Q | Norway | 1–2 | 6,200 |
| 18 August 1999 | UEFA Euro 2000 Q | Albania | 2–0 | 6,900 |
| 4 September 1999 | UEFA Euro 2000 Q | Georgia | 2–1 | 7,000 |
| 13 November 1999 | UEFA Euro 2000 Q | Ukraine | 2–1 | 9,000 |
| 3 June 2000 | Friendly | Saudi Arabia | 2–0 | 9,000 |
| 11 October 2000 | 2002 FIFA World Cup Q | Switzerland | 2–2 | 6,650 |
| 28 March 2001 | 2002 FIFA World Cup Q | FR Yugoslavia | 1–1 | 9,000 |
| 2 June 2001 | 2002 FIFA World Cup Q | Luxembourg | 2–0 | 4,500 |
| 15 August 2001 | Friendly | Romania | 2–2 | 6,000 |
| 1 September 2001 | 2002 FIFA World Cup Q | Russia | 2–1 | 9,000 |
| 6 October 2001 | 2002 FIFA World Cup Q | Faroe Islands | 3–0 | 8,500 |
| 10 November 2001 | 2002 FIFA World Cup Q | Romania | 2–1 | 9,000 |
| 17 April 2002 | Friendly | Tunisia | 1–0 | 5,500 |
| 17 May 2002 | Friendly | Ghana | 2–0 | 7,000 |
| 7 September 2002 | UEFA Euro 2004 Q | Malta | 3–0 | 7,000 |
| 2 April 2003 | UEFA Euro 2004 Q | Cyprus | 4–1 | 7,000 |
| 6 September 2003 | UEFA Euro 2004 Q | Israel | 3–1 | 8,000 |
| 10 September 2003 | UEFA Euro 2004 Q | France | 0–2 | 8,500 |
| 19 November 2003 | UEFA Euro 2004 Q | Croatia | 0–1 | 8,500 |
| 18 August 2004 | Friendly | Serbia and Montenegro | 1–1 | 5,000 |
