= 1993–94 SV Austria Salzburg season =

SV Austria Salzburg
1993–94 season
- Manager: Otto Barić
- Stadium: Stadion Lehen
- Bundesliga: 1st
- ÖFB-Cup: Fourth round
- UEFA Cup: Runners-up
- Intertoto Cup: Group stage
- Top goalscorer: League: Heimo Pfeifenberger and Nikola Jurčević (14 goals); All: Heimo Pfeifenberger (21 goals)
- Average home league attendance: 10,250

After narrowly missing out on a league title in 1992–93 due to Austria Wien scoring more goals, Austria Salzburg finally won its first ever league title, with 51 points, two more than previous champions Austria Wien, who were runners-up in the league, and who defeated Salzburg in the fourth round of the Austrian Cup. In the UEFA Cup, they defeated DAC Dunajská Streda, Royal Antwerp, Sporting CP, Eintracht Frankfurt and Karlsruher SC, reaching the finals, where they lost to Inter Milan on both legs.

== Squad ==
Note: Flags indicate national team as defined under FIFA eligibility rules; some limited exceptions apply. Players may hold more than one non-FIFA nationality.

No.	Pos.	Nation	Player
1	GK	AUT	Otto Konrad
2	DF	AUT	Leo Lainer
3	DF	AUT	Heribert Weber
4	DF	AUT	Kurt Garger
5	DF	AUT	Christian Fürstaller
6	MF	AUT	Franz Aigner
7	FW	CRO	Nikola Jurčević
8	MF	AUT	Peter Artner
9	FW	BRA	Marquinho
10	DF	AUT	Wolfgang Feiersinger

No.	Pos.	Nation	Player
11	FW	AUT	Hermann Stadler
12	FW	AUT	Damir Mužek
13	DF	AUT	Thomas Winklhofer
14	MF	AUT	Adi Hütter
—	DF	AUT	Christian Kraiger
17	MF	AUT	Martin Amerhauser
19	FW	AUT	Heimo Pfeifenberger
20	FW	AUT	Michael Steiner
21	GK	AUT	Herbert Ilsanker

=== Left club during season ===
Note: Flags indicate national team as defined under FIFA eligibility rules; some limited exceptions apply. Players may hold more than one non-FIFA nationality.

No.	Pos.	Nation	Player
—	FW	AUT	Herfried Sabitzer (to LASK)

== Competitions ==
=== Bundesliga ===
After five games, Salzburg were in sixth place in the league table after two consecutive defeats. Although they won their next game 2–0 at home to Vorwärts Steyr, the players were booed and Heimo Pfeifenberger was involved in a confrontation with fans.

Salzburg were crowned Bundesliga champions for the first time in their history. Pfeifenberger and teammate Nikola Jurčević were the top scorers in the division, with 14 goals each.

==== League table ====
Pos	Team	Pld	W	D	L	GF	GA	GD	Pts	Qualification or relegation
1	Austria Salzburg (C)	36	21	9	6	56	18	+38	51	Qualification to Champions League qualifying round
2	Austria Wien	36	22	5	9	63	39	+24	49	Qualification to Cup Winners' Cup first round
3	Admira/Wacker	36	18	8	10	51	35	+16	44	Qualification to UEFA Cup first round
4	Tirol Innsbruck	36	14	11	11	48	33	+15	39	Qualification to UEFA Cup first round
5	Rapid Wien	36	12	11	13	38	42	−4	35	

Source: bundesliga.at (in German)
(C) Champions

==== Matches ====
31 July 1993 1	Wiener Sport-Club	0–0	Austria Salzburg	Sportclub-Platz, Vienna
18:30		Report		Attendance: 2,545; Referee: Roman Steindl

4 August 1993 2	Austria Salzburg	1–0	Tirol Innsbruck	Stadion Lehen, Salzburg
19:00	Jurčević 38'	Report		Attendance: 11,500; Referee: Alfred Wieser

7 August 1993 3	Austria Wien	1–2	Austria Salzburg	Franz Horr Stadium, Vienna
18:30	Narbekovas 62'	Report	Pfeifenberger 34', 56'	Attendance: 5,500; Referee: Gerd Grabher

11 August 1993 4	Austria Salzburg	1–2	VfB Mödling	Stadion Lehen, Salzburg
19:00	Sabitzer 84'	Report	Gager 28'; Nikischer 61'	Attendance: 11,000; Referee: Rudolf Finzinger

14 August 1993 5	St. Pölten	1–0	Austria Salzburg	VOITH-Platz, St. Pölten
18:30	Maul 85'	Report		Attendance: 3,500; Referee: Robert Sedlacek

20 August 1993 6	Austria Salzburg	2–0	Vorwärts Steyr	Stadion Lehen, Salzburg
17:00	Pfeifenberger 52'; Jurčević 65'	Report		Attendance: 7,500; Referee: Fritz Stuchlik

28 August 1993 7	Austria Salzburg	1–0	Rapid Wien	Stadion Lehen, Salzburg
18:30	Stadler 19'	Report		Attendance: 10,000; Referee: Roman Steindl

1 September 1993 8	Admira Wacker	1–0	Austria Salzburg	Bundesstadion, Maria Enzersdorf
19:30	Gruber 76'	Report		Attendance: 1,800; Referee: Alfred Wieser

4 September 1993 9	Austria Salzburg	2–0	Sturm Graz	Stadion Lehen, Salzburg
15:30	Stadler 35'; Jurčević 90'	Report		Attendance: 6,500; Referee: Friedrich Kaupe

8 September 1993 10	Sturm Graz	0–2	Austria Salzburg	Sturm-Platz, Graz
17:15		Report	Amerhauser 64'; Jurčević 90'	Attendance: 8,000; Referee: Gerhard Benedek

17 September 1993 11	Austria Salzburg	3–1	Wiener Sport-Club	Stadion Lehen, Salzburg
19:00	Amerhauser 44'; Artner 45'; Pfeifenberger 90+2'	Report	Keglevits 75'	Attendance: 5,500; Referee: Manfred Kaimbacher

24 September 1993 12	Tirol Innsbruck	2–0	Austria Salzburg	Tivol Stadion, Innsbruck
19:30	Daněk 7'; Westerthaler 82'	Report		Attendance: 11,000; Referee: Robert Sedlacek

2 October 1993 13	Austria Salzburg	2–0	Austria Wien	Stadion Lehen, Salzburg
15:30	Muzek 9'; Stadler 30'	Report		Attendance: 11,000; Referee: Karl Fizinger

8 October 1993 14	VfB Mödling	1–1	Austria Salzburg	Stadion Mödling, Mödling
19:30	Dragoslavic 54'	Report	Artner 34'	Attendance: 3,500; Referee: Dr. Peter Lerchenmüller

22 October 1993 15	Austria Salzburg	2–0	St. Pölten	Stadion Lehen, Salzburg
19:00	Muzek 10'; Jurčević 87'	Report		Attendance: 6,000; Referee: Rudolf Finzinger

30 October 1993 16	Vorwärts Steyr	0–2	Austria Salzburg	Vorwärts Stadium, Steyr
15:30		Report	Artner 12'; Aigner 84'	Attendance: 6,000; Referee: Johann Scheuhammer

6 November 1993 17	Rapid Wien	0–3	Austria Salzburg	Gerhard-Hanappi-Stadion, Vienna
15:30	Amerhauser 40'; Jurčević 71'; Lainer 85'	Report		Attendance: 5,000; Referee: Alfred Wieser

13 November 1993 18	Austria Salzburg	0–0	Admira Wacker	Stadion Lehen, Salzburg
15:30		Report		Attendance: 11,000; Referee: Manfred Schüttengruber

20 November 1993 19	Wiener Sport-Club	0–1	Austria Salzburg	Sportclub-Platz, Vienna
15:30		Report	Artner 75'	Attendance: 1,000; Referee: Werner Winkelbauer

27 November 1993 20	Austria Salzburg	0–0	Tirol Innsbruck	Stadion Lehen, Salzburg
15:30		Report		Attendance: 6,000; Referee: Friedrich Kaupe

6 March 1994 21	Austria Wien	0–4	Austria Salzburg	Stadion Lehen, Salzburg
15:30		Report	Jurčević 53', 73', 78' (pen.), 85'	Attendance: 7,000; Referee: Gerd Grabher

11 March 1994 22	Austria Salzburg	0–0	VfB Mödling	Stadion Lehen, Salzburg
19:00		Report		Attendance: 12,500; Referee: Dr. Peter Lerchenmüller

19 March 1994 23	St. Pölten	0–0	Austria Salzburg	VOITH-Platz, St. Pölten
15:30		Report		Attendance: 3,800; Referee: Konrad Plautz

5 April 1994 25	Austria Salzburg	2–1	Rapid Wien	Stadion Lehen, Salzburg
19:00	Jurčević 52' (pen.); Stadler 74'	Report	Alihodžić 90'	Attendance: 11,000; Referee: Günter Benkö

8 April 1994 26	Admira Wacker	0–3	Austria Salzburg	Bundesstadion, Maria Enzersdorf
19:30		Report	Hütter 39'; Pfeifenberger 69'; Marquinho 71'	Attendance: 2,500; Referee: Karl Finzinger

16 April 1994 27	Austria Salzburg	0–0	Sturm Graz	Stadion Lehen, Salzburg
15:30		Report		Attendance: 12,000; Referee: Robert Sedlacek

22 April 1994 28	Sturm Graz	0–1	Austria Salzburg	Stadion Liebenau, Graz
19:00		Report	Pfeifenberger 90'	Attendance: 11,000; Referee: Dr. Peter Lerchenmüller

30 April 1994 29	Austria Salzburg	0–1	Wiener Sport-Club	Stadion Lehen, Salzburg
15:30		Report	Koniarek 90'	Attendance: 7,000; Referee: Manfred Ritzinger

3 May 1994 30	Tirol Innsbruck	1–1	Austria Salzburg	Tivoli Stadion, Innsbruck
19:30	Kirchler 77'	Report	Pfeifenberger 7'	Attendance: 6,000; Referee: Roman Steindl

6 May 1994 31	Austria Salzburg	6–0	Austria Wien	Stadion Lehen, Salzburg
19:00	Marquinho 35', 78'; Pfeifenberger 38', 55'; Lainer 43'; Stadler 77'	Report		Attendance: 15,000; Referee: Gerd Grabher

14 May 1994 32	VfB Mödling	3–2	Austria Salzburg	Stadion Mödling, Mödling
15:30	Nikischer 16'; Orie 25'; Poiger 63'	Report	Lainer 5'; Hütter 43'	Attendance: 5,000; Referee: Günter Benkö

20 May 1994 33	Austria Salzburg	4–1	St. Pölten	Stadion Lehen, Salzburg
19:00	Pfeifenberger 2' (pen.), 31', 40'; Jurčević 49'	Report	Rosenegger 84'	Attendance: 10,000; Referee: Werner Winkelbauer

25 May 1994 24	Austria Salzburg	3–1	Vorwärts Steyr	Stadion Lehen, Salzburg
19:00	Stadler 2'; Hütter 10'; Jurčević 74'	Report	Gröbl 24'	Attendance: 14,000; Referee: Dr. Peter Lerchenmüller

28 May 1994 34	Vorwärts Steyr	1–3	Austria Salzburg	Vorwärts Stadium, Steyr
15:30	Feric 90+1'	Report	Muzek 48'; Jurčević 60'; Aigner 82'	Attendance: 8,500; Referee: Manfred Ritzinger

5 June 1994 35	Rapid Wien	0–0	Austria Salzburg	Gerhard-Hanappi-Stadion, Vienna
15:00		Report		Attendance: 11,000; Referee: Karl Finzinger

8 June 1994 36	Austria Salzburg	2–0	Admira Wacker	Stadion Lehen, Salzburg
19:00	Pfeifenberger 8', 47'	Report		Attendance: 17,000; Referee: Manfred Schüttengruber

=== ÖFB-Cup ===
10 September 1993 Second round	USK Anif	1–7	Austria Salzburg	Sportplatz Anif, Salzburg
16:30	Wechselberger 76'	Report	Jurčević 14' (pen.); Winklhofer 48'; Sabitzer 54', 74', 84'; Aigner 60'; Hütter 62'	Attendance: 1,000; Referee: Richard Heugenhauser

16 October 1993 Round of 32	SV Flavia Solva	1–5	Austria Salzburg	Römerstadion, Wagna
14:00	Genseberger 81'	Report	Pfeifenberger 10', 58', 67'; Hütter 87'; Winklhofer 90+1'	Attendance: 4,000; Referee: Fritz Stuchlik

2 April 1994 Round of 16	Austria Wien	2–1	Austria Salzburg	Ernst-Happel-Stadion, Vienna
15:00	Hasenhüttl 64'; Kogler 69'	Report	Jurčević 21'	Attendance: 3,000; Referee: Alfred Wieser

=== UEFA Cup ===
Salzburg reached the final of the 1993-94 UEFA Cup. In the third round, they scored a surprise win over Portugal's Sporting CP. Martin Amerhauser scored the winning goal in extra time in the second leg and reportedly became a teen idol as a result.

Their opponents in the final were the Italian side Inter Milan. Despite Inter having a player sent off, Salzburg lost the first leg of the two-legged match 1–0. The score in the second leg was the same.

Salzburg opted to play their UEFA Cup matches from the quarter-final stage onwards at the Ernst-Happel-Stadion in Vienna, a decision which resulted in club president Rudi Quehenberger receiving protests and death threats.

==== First round ====
14 September 1993 First leg	Austria Salzburg	2–0	(Slovakia) DAC Dunajská Streda	Stadion Lehen, Salzburg
19:00	Amerhauser 40'; Pfeifenberger 85'	Report		Attendance: 5,085; Referee: Walter Cinciripini (Italy)

28 September 1993 Second leg	DAC Dunajská Streda (Slovakia)	0–2	Austria Salzburg	Mestský štadión, Dunajská Streda
15:00		Report	Stadler 19'; Pfeifenberger 58'	Attendance: 7,900; Referee: Christer Fällström (Sweden)

==== Second round ====
19 October 1993 First leg	Austria Salzburg	1–0	(Belgium) Royal Antwerp	Stadion Lehen, Salzburg
19:00	Jurčević 67'	Report		Attendance: 8,700; Referee: Loizos Loizou (Cyprus)

2 November 1993 Second leg	Royal Antwerp (Belgium)	0–1	Austria Salzburg	Bosuilstadion, Antwerp
20:00		Report	Feiersinger 84'	Attendance: 7,793; Referee: Charles Agius (Malta)

==== Third round ====
24 November 1993 First leg	Sporting CP (Portugal)	2–0	Austria Salzburg	Estádio José Alvalade, Lisbon
19:30	Shcherbakov 24'; Cadete 63'	Report		Attendance: 37,000; Referee: Antonio López Nieto (Spain)

7 December 1993 Second leg	Austria Salzburg	3–0 (a.e.t.)	(Portugal) Sporting CP	Stadion Lehen, Salzburg
19:00	Lainer 48'; Hütter 89'; Amerhauser 112'	Report		Attendance: 10,500; Referee: Mario van der Ende (Netherlands)

==== Quarter-final ====
3 March 1994 First leg	Austria Salzburg	1–0	(Germany) Eintracht Frankfurt	Ernst-Happel-Stadion, Vienna
20:20	Hütter 33'	Report		Attendance: 42,000; Referee: Sergei Khusainov (Russia)

15 March 1994 Second leg	Eintracht Frankfurt (Germany)	1–0 (a.e.t.) (4–5 p)	Austria Salzburg	Waldstadion, Frankfurt
18:00	Gaudino 21'	Report		Attendance: 26,000; Referee: David Elleray (England)
	Penalties
	Bein (penalty scored); Reis (penalty scored); Gaudino (penalty missed); Furtok (penalty scored); Stein (penalty scored); Binz (penalty missed)		(penalty scored) Lainer; (penalty scored) Jurčević; (penalty missed) Feiersinger; (penalty scored) Hütter; (penalty scored) Pfeifenberger; (penalty scored) Konrad

==== Semi-final ====
29 March 1994 First leg	Austria Salzburg	0–0	(Germany) Karlsruhe	Ernst-Happel-Stadion, Vienna
20:20		Report		Attendance: 47,800; Referee: Vassilios Nikakis (Greece)

12 April 1994 Second leg	Karlsruhe (Germany)	1–1	Austria Salzburg	Wildparkstadion, Karlsruhe
20:15	Krieg 54'	Report	Stadler 12'	Attendance: 21,139; Referee: Frans Van Den Wijngaert (Belgium)

==== Final ====
26 April 1994 First leg	Austria Salzburg	0–1	(Italy) Inter Milan	Ernst-Happel-Stadion, Vienna
20:30		Report	Berti 35'	Attendance: 47,500; Referee: Kim Milton Nielsen (Denmark)

11 May 1994 Second leg	Inter Milan (Italy)	1–0	Austria Salzburg	San Siro, Milan
20:30	Jonk 62'	Report		Attendance: 80,326; Referee: Jim McCluskey (Scotland)

=== Intertoto Cup ===
3 July 1993 1	Austria Salzburg	2–1	(Romania) Oțelul Galați	Sportzentrum Aug, Seekirchen am Wallersee
18:30	Pfeifenberger 15', 22'		Cornea 40'	Attendance: 1,000; Referee: Rudolf Finzinger

10 July 1993 2	Austria Salzburg	0–2	(Switzerland) Young Boys	Sportplatz Trimmelkam, Trimmelkam
18:30			Kunz 15'; Bregy 68'	Attendance: 2,000; Referee: Dr. Peter Lerchenmüller

17 July 1993 3	Aarhus GF (Denmark)	5–1	Austria Salzburg	Ceres Park Vejlby, Risskov
17:00	Thomsen 36'; Nielsen 50' (pen.); Andersen 62'; Mortensen 74'; Larsen 79'		Hütter 2'	Attendance: 450

24 July 1993 4	Sigma Olomouc (Czech Republic)	2–0	Austria Salzburg	Andrův stadion, Olomouc
17:00	Fujdiar 36'; Maroši 56'
