= 1994 UEFA Cup final =

- Event: 1993–94 UEFA Cup
Austria Salzburg	Inter Milan
(Austria)	(Italy)
0	2
- on aggregate

First leg
Austria Salzburg	Inter Milan
0	1
- Date: 26 April 1994
- Venue: Ernst-Happel-Stadion, Vienna
- Referee: Kim Milton Nielsen (Denmark)
- Attendance: 47,500

Second leg
Inter Milan	Austria Salzburg
1	0
- Date: 11 May 1994
- Venue: Stadio Giuseppe Meazza, Milan
- Referee: Jim McCluskey (Scotland)
- Attendance: 80,326

The 1994 UEFA Cup final was a two-legged match that took place on 26 April 1994 and 11 May 1994 at the Ernst-Happel-Stadion in Vienna and Stadio Giuseppe Meazza in Milan between Inter Milan of Italy and Austria Salzburg of Austria. Inter Milan won both games 1–0 to record a 2–0 aggregate victory.

== Route to the final ==
Inter Milan				Austria Salzburg
Opponent	Result	Legs	Round	Opponent	Result	Legs
(Romania) Rapid București	5–1	3–1 home; 2–0 away	First round	(Slovakia) DAC Dunajská Streda	4–0	2–0 home; 2–0 away
(Cyprus) Apollon Limassol	4–3	1–0 home; 3–3 away	Second round	(Belgium) Royal Antwerp	2–0	1–0 home; 1–0 away
(England) Norwich City	2–0	1–0 home; 1–0 away	Third round	(Portugal) Sporting CP	3–2	3–0 home (aet); 0–2 away
(Germany) Borussia Dortmund	4–3	1–2 home; 3–1 away	Quarter-finals	(Germany) Eintracht Frankfurt	1–1 (5–4p)	1–0 home; 0–1 away
(Italy) Cagliari	5–3	3–0 home; 2–3 away	Semi-finals	(Germany) Karlsruhe	1–1 (a)	0–0 home; 1–1 away

== Match ==
=== First leg ===
26 April 1994
20:30 CEST

Austria Salzburg	0–1	(Italy) Inter Milan
	Report	Berti 35'

Ernst-Happel-Stadion, Vienna
Attendance: 47,500
Referee: Kim Milton Nielsen (Denmark)

Austria Salzburg	Inter Milan

GK	1	(Austria) Otto Konrad
SW	3	(Austria) Heribert Weber (c)
CB	5	(Austria) Christian Fürstaller
CB	2	(Austria) Leo Lainer
RWB	4	(Austria) Thomas Winklhofer		(substituted off) 61'
LWB	6	(Austria) Franz Aigner
CM	8	(Austria) Peter Artner
CM	7	(Austria) Martin Amerhauser		(substituted off) 46'
AM	9	(Brazil) Marquinho
CF	10	(Austria) Heimo Pfeifenberger	(yellow card) 5'
CF	11	(Austria) Hermann Stadler	(yellow card) 75'
Substitutes:
GK	21	(Austria) Herbert Ilsanker
DF	14	(Austria) Christian Kraiger
DF	15	(Austria) Andreas Reisinger
MF	12	(Croatia) Damir Mužek		(substituted on) 46'
MF	13	(Austria) Michael Steiner		(substituted on) 61'
Manager:
(Croatia) Otto Barić

GK	1	(Italy) Walter Zenga
SW	6	(Italy) Sergio Battistini
CB	2	(Italy) Giuseppe Bergomi (c)
CB	5	(Italy) Antonio Paganin
RWB	7	(Italy) Alessandro Bianchi	(yellow card) 11' (yellow-red card) 49'
LWB	3	(Italy) Angelo Orlando
CM	9	(Italy) Antonio Manicone
CM	8	(Netherlands) Wim Jonk	(yellow card) 50'
CM	4	(Italy) Nicola Berti
CF	10	(Netherlands) Dennis Bergkamp		(substituted off) 89'
CF	11	(Uruguay) Rubén Sosa		(substituted off) 75'
Substitutes:
GK	12	(Italy) Beniamino Abate
DF	15	(Italy) Riccardo Ferri		(substituted on) 75'
MF	14	(Italy) Francesco Dell'Anno		(substituted on) 89'
MF	13	(Italy) Massimo Paganin
FW	16	(Italy) Massimo Marazzina
Manager:
(Italy) Gianpiero Marini

Assistant referees:
Carl-Johan Christensen Meyer (Denmark)
Jens Peter Stærk (Denmark)
Fourth official:
Svend Erik Christensen (Denmark)

Match rules

- 90 minutes
- Five named substitutes, of which two may be used

=== Second leg ===
11 May 1994
20:30 CEST

Inter Milan (Italy)	1–0	Austria Salzburg
Jonk 62'	Report; Overview

Stadio Giuseppe Meazza, Milan
Attendance: 80,326
Referee: Jim McCluskey (Scotland)

Inter Milan	Austria Salzburg

GK	1	(Italy) Walter Zenga
SW	6	(Italy) Sergio Battistini
CB	2	(Italy) Giuseppe Bergomi (c)
CB	5	(Italy) Antonio Paganin
RWB	3	(Italy) Angelo Orlando	(yellow card) 38'
LWB	7	(Italy) Davide Fontolan	(yellow card) 44'	(substituted off) 67'
CM	9	(Italy) Antonio Manicone
CM	8	(Netherlands) Wim Jonk
CM	4	(Italy) Nicola Berti
CF	10	(Netherlands) Dennis Bergkamp		(substituted off) 89'
CF	11	(Uruguay) Rubén Sosa
Substitutes:
GK	12	(Italy) Raffaele Nuzzo
DF	15	(Italy) Riccardo Ferri		(substituted on) 67'
DF	13	(Italy) Massimo Paganin		(substituted on) 89'
MF	14	(Italy) Francesco Dell'Anno
FW	16	(Italy) Massimo Marazzina
Manager:
(Italy) Gianpiero Marini

GK	1	(Austria) Otto Konrad
SW	3	(Austria) Heribert Weber (c)
CB	2	(Austria) Leo Lainer
CB	5	(Austria) Christian Fürstaller
RWB	4	(Austria) Thomas Winklhofer		(substituted off) 67'
LWB	6	(Austria) Franz Aigner
CM	8	(Austria) Peter Artner		(substituted off) 73'
CM	10	(Austria) Wolfgang Feiersinger	(yellow card) 44'
CM	11	(Austria) Adi Hütter
CF	7	(Croatia) Nikola Jurčević
CF	9	(Brazil) Marquinho
Substitutes:
GK	16	(Austria) Herbert Ilsanker
DF	14	(Austria) Kurt Garger
MF	12	(Croatia) Damir Mužek
MF	13	(Austria) Martin Amerhauser		(substituted on) 67'
MF	15	(Austria) Michael Steiner	(yellow card) 79'	(substituted on) 73'
Manager:
(Croatia) Otto Barić

Assistant referees:
Iain Cathcart (Scotland)
Robert Orr (Scotland)
Fourth official:
Hugh Dallas (Scotland)

Match rules

- 90 minutes
- 30 minutes of extra time if necessary
- Penalty shoot-out if scores still level
- Five named substitutes, of which two may be used

== See also ==
- 1995 UEFA Champions League final
- 1994 European Cup Winners' Cup final
- Inter Milan in international football
- 1993–94 Inter Milan season
