= 1994–95 Austrian Football Bundesliga =

77th season of top-tier football league in Austria

Austrian Bundesliga
- Season: 1994–95
- Champions: SV Austria Salzburg
- Top goalscorer: Souleyman Sané (20)

The Austrian Football Bundesliga of 1994–95 was organised by the Austrian Football Association (ÖFB). The Austrian First League served as a stepping stone for promotion to the 1. Bundesliga. The Regional Leagues acted as a third step on the footballing ladder, East (Vienna, Lower Austria and Burgenland), Central (Mitte) (Carinthia, Upper Austria, and Styria) and West (Salzburg, Tirol, and Vorarlberg).

== Bundesliga ==
The Bundesliga was contest by 10 teams, who played against each other four times. SV Austria Salzburg won the Austrian Football Bundesliga for the second time. As champions they were able to take part in the qualifying rounds of the Champions League the following season, but they were knocked out in the qualifying rounds. Rapid Vienna were able to take part in the UEFA Cup Winners' Cup due to their cup victory, where they played in the final in Brussels. Sturm Graz as well as Austria Vienna represented Austrian football in UEFA Cup 1996, where Austria Vienna made Round 1. FC Tirol Innsbruck, Linz ASK and SK Vorwärts Steyr all took part in the UEFA Intertoto Cup of 1995, where Tirol made the final. VfB Mödling were relegated for finishing bottom. A play-off for the final relegation place occurred between FC Linz and SV Ried, which saw SV Ried win 3–0 over two legs, thereby relegating FC Linz to the Austrian First League and promoting Ried into the Bundesliga.

=== Teams and location ===
Location of teams in the 1994–95 Austrian Football Bundesliga

Teams of 1994–95 Austrian Football Bundesliga

- FC Admira/Wacker
- Austria Salzburg
- Austria Wien
- LASK
- FC Linz
- VfB Mödling
- Rapid Wien
- Sturm Graz
- Tirol Innsbruck
- Vorwärts Steyr

=== League standings ===
Pos	Team	Pld	W	D	L	GF	GA	GD	Pts	Qualification or relegation
1	Austria Salzburg (C)	36	15	17	4	48	24	+24	47	Qualification to Champions League qualifying round
2	Sturm Graz	36	18	11	7	58	41	+17	47	Qualification to UEFA Cup preliminary round
3	Rapid Wien	36	19	8	9	63	50	+13	46	Qualification to Cup Winners' Cup first round
4	Austria Wien	36	16	11	9	58	38	+20	43	Qualification to UEFA Cup preliminary round
5	Tirol Innsbruck	36	15	10	11	61	44	+17	40	Qualification to Intertoto Cup group stage
6	Linzer ASK	36	14	11	11	51	44	+7	39	Qualification to Intertoto Cup group stage
7	Admira/Wacker	36	11	11	14	48	55	−7	33	
8	Vorwärts Steyr	36	9	11	16	40	49	−9	29	Qualification to Intertoto Cup group stage
9	FC Linz (R)	36	5	10	21	33	81	−48	20	Qualification for relegation play-offs
10	VfB Mödling (R)	36	4	8	24	28	62	−34	16	Relegation to Austrian First Football League

Source: weltfussball.de (in German)
(C) Champions; (R) Relegated

=== Results ===
Teams played each other four times in the league. In the first half of the season each team played every other team twice (home and away), and then did the same in the second half of the season.

==== First half of season ====
Home \ Away	ADM	ASZ	AWI	FCL	LIN	RWI	STU	TIR	MÖD	VOR
Admira/Wacker		1–1	0–0	1–2	1–1	3–0	1–2	3–1	3–1	4–2
Austria Salzburg	4–2		1–0	4–1	1–2	3–0	1–1	1–1	2–0	2–2
Austria Wien	5–0	3–1		4–0	1–0	1–1	3–2	0–0	2–0	1–0
FC Linz	2–1	1–1	2–2		1–1	1–1	1–1	1–3	3–1	3–1
Linzer ASK	2–0	0–0	1–1	0–2		1–3	3–0	1–1	2–2	1–1
Rapid Wien	2–2	1–1	3–1	0–0	1–2		2–3	3–1	2–1	3–1
Sturm Graz	0–1	0–1	1–4	2–2	1–0	2–0		0–0	3–0	1–1
Tirol Innsbruck	5–1	0–0	2–0	3–0	1–0	2–3	5–0		3–1	0–1
VfB Mödling	2–1	0–0	1–1	3–1	1–2	1–2	1–2	2–3		1–2
Vorwärts Steyr	2–2	0–0	1–1	3–0	0–3	1–2	2–1	5–0	2–0	

Source: weltfussball.de (in German)
Legend: Blue = home team win; Yellow = draw; Red = away team win.

==== Second half of season ====
Home \ Away	ADM	ASZ	AWI	FCL	LIN	RWI	STU	TIR	MÖD	VOR
Admira/Wacker		0–1	2–1	2–0	1–1	0–2	1–2	2–0	1–1	1–0
Austria Salzburg	2–0		3–0	3–0	0–0	0–0	1–1	1–1	2–0	2–0
Austria Wien	1–2	0–1		4–1	2–0	1–1	0–0	0–0	2–1	1–1
FC Linz	2–2	0–3	1–7		0–4	2–3	0–2	0–1	0–3	0–0
Linzer ASK	1–2	2–0	1–0	3–1		1–2	1–2	2–0	4–1	2–1
Rapid Wien	3–2	0–2	1–3	4–1	3–0		1–3	2–2	2–1	3–1
Sturm Graz	2–2	2–2	6–0	3–1	3–3	2–0		3–0	1–0	1–0
Tirol Innsbruck	1–1	2–0	1–2	3–0	6–1	2–3	0–1		1–0	1–1
VfB Mödling	0–0	0–0	0–1	1–1	0–1	0–3	0–0	1–6		1–0
Vorwärts Steyr	1–0	1–1	0–3	1–0	2–2	0–1	1–2	2–3	1–0	

Source: weltfussball.de (in German)
Legend: Blue = home team win; Yellow = draw; Red = away team win.

=== Top goalscorers ===
Rank	Scorer	Club	Goals
1	(Senegal) Souleyman Sané	Tirol Innsbruck	20
2	(Norway) Mons Ivar Mjelde	Austria Wien	17
3	(Austria) Mario Haas	Sturm Graz	13
3	(Austria) Thomas Janeschitz	Tirol Innsbruck	13
3	(Austria) Marcus Pürk	Rapid Wien	13
6	(Austria) Christian Stumpf	FC Linz	12
7	(Austria) Heimo Pfeifenberger	Austria Salzburg	11
7	(Austria) Herfried Sabitzer	Linzer ASK	11
7	(Austria) Christoph Westerthaler	Vorwärts Steyr	11

=== Austria Salzburg's Team ===
Otto Konrad, Herbert Ilsanker – Christian Fürstaller, Leo Lainer, Peter Artner, Wolfgang Feiersinger – Thomas Winklhofer, Hermann Stadler, Franz Aigner, Adi Hütter, Tomislav Kocijan, Mladen Mladenović, Arnold Freisegger, Martin Hiden – Heimo Pfeifenberger, Martin Amerhauser, Nikola Jurčević, Eduard Glieder, Ralph Hasenhüttl, Klaus Dietrich, Dean Računica, Helmut Rottensteiner, Gerhard Struber – Manager: Otto Barić

== Relegation play-offs ==
Team 1	Agg.	Team 2	1st leg	2nd leg
FC Linz	0–3	SV Ried	0–2	0–1

== First League ==
Pos	Team	Pld	W	D	L	GF	GA	GD	Pts	Promotion or relegation
1	Grazer AK (C, P)	30	22	6	2	62	15	+47	50	Promotion to 1995–96 Austrian Bundesliga
2	SV Ried (P)	30	20	6	4	55	18	+37	46	Qualification for promotion play-offs
3	First Vienna FC 1894	30	18	4	8	68	33	+35	40	
4	SV Spittal/Drau	30	16	8	6	59	36	+23	40	
5	SC Austria Lustenau	30	15	6	9	60	26	+34	36	
6	VSE Sankt Pölten	30	13	9	8	53	32	+21	35	
7	SV Oberwart	30	10	11	9	40	40	0	31	
8	SpG Wiener Sport-Club/Gerasdorf	30	10	11	9	40	42	−2	31	
9	FC Kufstein	30	10	9	11	32	44	−12	29	
10	DSV Leoben	30	7	13	10	30	31	−1	27	
11	SV Braunau	30	10	5	15	33	50	−17	25	
12	SV Flavia Solva Wagna	30	5	13	12	22	42	−20	23	
13	ASKÖ Klingenbach	30	4	13	13	20	44	−24	21	
14	FC Puch (R)	30	7	7	16	33	59	−26	21	Relegation to 1995–96 Austrian Regionalliga
15	SV Stockerau (R)	30	3	9	18	16	50	−34	15	Relegation to 1995–96 Austrian Regionalliga
16	1. Wiener Neustädter SC (R)	30	2	6	22	24	85	−61	10	Relegation to 1995–96 Austrian Regionalliga

Source: weltfussball.de (in German)
(C) Champions; (P) Promoted; (R) Relegated

=== Top goalscorers ===
Rank	Scorer	Club	Goals
1	(Netherlands) Marcel Oerlemans	First Vienna	20
2	(Austria) Matthias Bleyer	SV Braunau	16
3	(Austria) Herbert Wieger	Grazer AK	15
3	(Austria) Markus Weissenberger	SV Spittal	15
5	(Austria) Peter Pospisil	First Vienna	14
5	(Austria) Manfred Wachter	First Vienna	14
7	(Austria) Eduard Glieder	Grazer AK	13
7	(Austria) Joachim Moitzi	Austria Lustenau	13
7	(Federal Republic of Yugoslavia) Zoran Toskić	FC Kufstein	13

== Regional Leagues ==
East
Pos	Team	Pld	W	D	L	GF	GA	GD	Pts	Promotion or relegation
1	Favoritner AC (C, P)	30	23	5	2	78	14	+64	51	Promotion to Austrian First Football League
2	SV Mattersburg	30	20	6	4	70	32	+38	46	
3	ASK Bruck/Leitha	30	13	10	7	52	34	+18	36	
4	Wiener Sport-Club	30	12	11	7	49	38	+11	35	
5	FC Waidhofen/Ybbs	30	14	7	9	48	45	+3	35	
6	SV Sigleß	30	14	6	10	55	51	+4	34	
7	SC Himberg	30	10	11	9	47	38	+9	31	
8	SV Horn	30	11	9	10	45	44	+1	31	
9	EPSV Gmünd	30	14	2	14	60	46	+14	30	
10	Floridsdorfer AC	30	9	10	11	40	37	+3	28	
11	SC Zwettl	30	11	6	13	56	57	−1	28	
12	SV Schwechat	30	11	6	13	48	59	−11	28	
13	SC Eisenstadt	30	9	8	13	44	53	−9	26	Relegation to Austrian Landesliga
14	SR Donaufeld	30	9	4	17	43	49	−6	22	Relegation to Austrian Landesliga
15	Kremser SC	30	5	3	22	20	87	−67	13	Relegation to Austrian Landesliga
16	FC Stadlau	30	2	2	26	37	108	−71	6	Relegation to Austrian Landesliga

Source: rsssf.com
(C) Champions; (P) Promoted

Central
Pos	Team	Pld	W	D	L	GF	GA	GD	Pts	Promotion or relegation
1	SAK Klagenfurt (C, P)	28	16	5	7	56	35	+21	37	Promotion to Austrian First Football League
2	Wolfsberger AC	28	13	9	6	65	26	+39	35	
3	ASK Voitsberg	28	15	5	8	56	42	+14	35	
4	Villacher SV	28	13	6	9	41	34	+7	32	
5	LUV Graz	28	11	4	13	40	52	−12	26	
6	SC Marchtrenk	28	8	8	12	36	37	−1	24	
7	SV Traun (R)	28	5	9	14	29	60	−31	19	Relegation to Austrian Landesliga
8	ASKÖ Donau Linz (R)	28	6	4	18	30	67	−37	16	Relegation to Austrian Landesliga

Source: rsssf.com
(C) Champions; (P) Promoted; (R) Relegated

West
Pos	Team	Pld	W	D	L	GF	GA	GD	Pts	Promotion
1	WSG Swarovski Wattens (C, P)	14	7	5	2	27	15	+12	19	Promotion to Austrian First Football League
2	FC Hard	14	8	2	4	29	13	+16	18	
3	SC Kundl	14	6	5	3	24	23	+1	17	
4	FC Salzburg	14	7	2	5	27	24	+3	16	
5	Schwarz-Weiß Bregenz	14	6	2	6	26	28	−2	14	
6	FC Rot-Weiß Rankweil	14	3	5	6	19	26	−7	11	
7	SV Wörgl	14	4	2	8	23	24	−1	10	
8	SV Wals-Grünau	14	1	5	8	11	33	−22	7	

Source: rsssf.com
(C) Champions; (P) Promoted

== Attendances ==
#	Club	Average
1	Salzburg	12,889
2	Rapid	9,472
3	LASK	8,906
4	Tirol	8,011
5	Sturm	7,417
6	Austria	5,494
7	Linz	4,564
8	Steyr	4,500
9	Admira	2,297
10	Mödling	1,772

== Literature ==
- Josef Huber: Tagebuch des Jahrhunderts, Fußball-Österreich von 1901 bis 2000, Verlag Wolfgang Drabesch, Wien 2000
