= Damir Mužek =

Croatian footballer

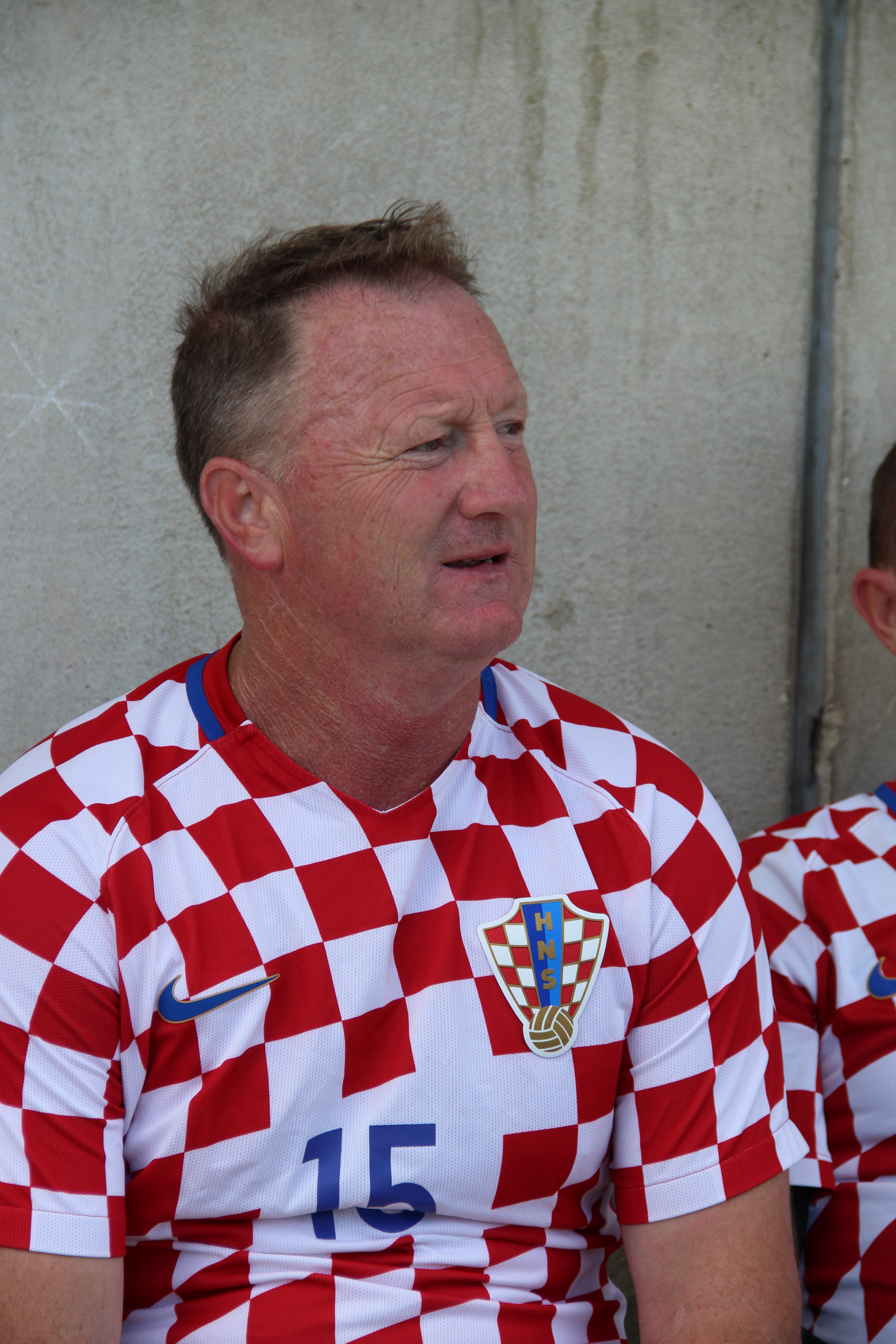
- Mužek in 2018

Personal information
- Date of birth: 8 April 1967 (age 59)
- Place of birth: Vrapče, Zagreb, SR Croatia, SFR Yugoslavia
- Position: Midfielder

Senior career*
Years	Team	Apps	(Gls)
1991–1992	NK Zagreb		
1992–1993	Sturm Graz	22	(2)
1993–1994	Casino Salzburg	24	(3)
1994–1998	Grazer AK	79+	(0+)
1998–2000	Varteks	49	(7)
2000–2001	Slaven Belupo	22	(0)
2001–2002	Čakovec	23	(1)
2003–2004	Inter Zaprešić		
2005	SV St Johann im Saggautal	3	(0)

Managerial career
- 2007: Moslavina
- 2009–2010: Hrvatski Dragovoljac
- 2013: Vinogradar
- 2013–2014: NK Inter Sloga
- 2015: Vrapče
- * Club domestic league appearances and goals

Damir Mužek (born 8 April 1967) is a Croatian former professional footballer who played as a midfielder.

== Career ==
Mužek played six years in Austria, and was a substitute for Martin Amerhauser in the 1994 UEFA Cup Final first leg for Casino Salzburg. He also played for Varteks, Slaven Belupo and Inter Zaprešić.

In June 2020 he was announced sports director at NK Vrapče.

== Personal life ==
His son Mateo played professionally in Kazakhstan, among others.
