= Hermann Stadler =

Austrian footballer

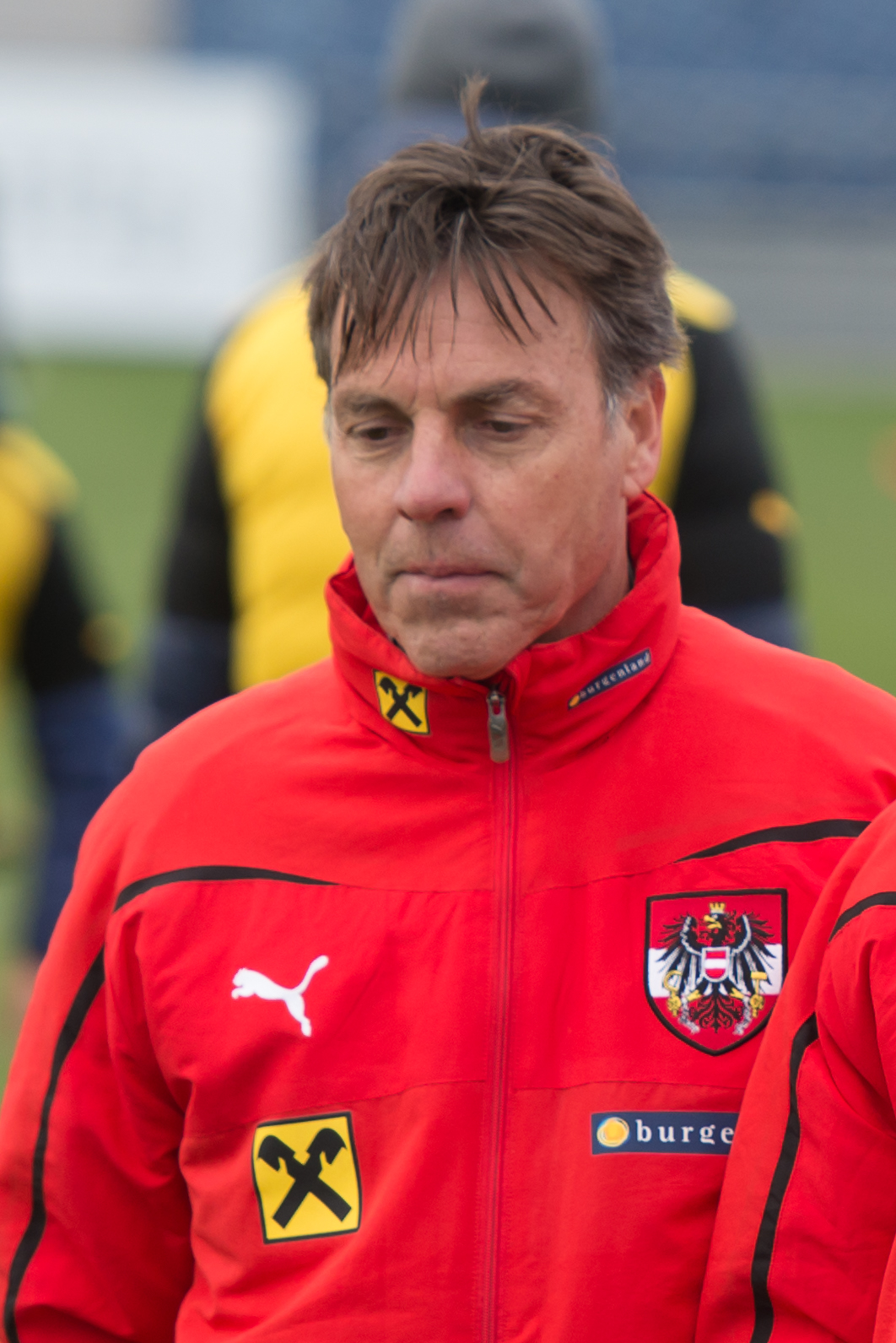
Stadler as coach of the Austria U19

Hermann Stadler (born 21 May 1961) is an Austrian professional football manager and former player who played as a forward. He is currently in charge of the Austria national under-18 team.

== Playing career ==
Stadler started playing football in his local club Oberndorfer SK. His professional career started in 1979, when he came to SV Austria Salzburg. In 1983, he signed for Rapid Wien along with his close friend Leo Lainer. But he did not play often for Rapid, so he left the club and played a short time for SK VOEST Linz. Then, he returned to Salzburg, who were in the second division.

He had the most success as a player with Salzburg, becoming a double Austrian champion and reaching the final of the UEFA Cup in 1994 against Inter Milan. His career ended in 1996 after 380 league matches (323 for Salzburg, 48 for Rapid, 9 for VOEST Linz) and 38 goals (36 for Salzburg, 2 for Rapid)

== Coaching career ==
After retiring, he stayed with Salzburg as a coach. He also managed various Austrian national youth teams and led the under-17 side to the 2013 FIFA U-17 World Cup.

== Honours ==
=== Player ===
Rapid Wien

- Austrian Bundesliga: 1986–87
- Austrian Cup: 1983–84, 1984–85, 1986–87
- UEFA Cup Winners' Cup runner-up: 1984–85

Austria Salzburg

- Austrian Bundesliga: 1993–94, 1994–95
- UEFA Cup runner-up: 1993–94

=== Managerial ===
Austria U17

- FIFA U-17 World Cup runner-up: 2025
