= Franz Aigner =

Franz Aigner may refer to:

- Franz Aigner (footballer) (born 1967), Austrian footballer
- Franz Aigner (physicist) (1882–1945), Austrian physicist and winner of the Haitinger Prize in 1924
- Franz Aigner (weightlifter) (1892–1970), Austrian weightlifter
