= Adi Hütter =

Austrian football manager (born 1970)

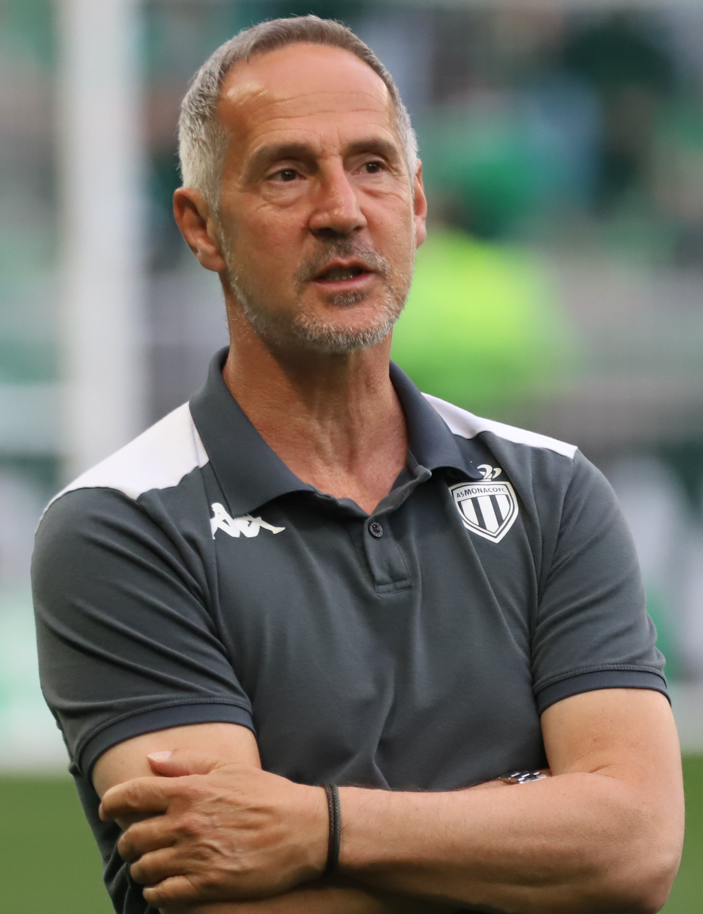
- Hütter with Monaco in 2025

Personal information
- Full name: Adolf Hütter
- Date of birth: 11 February 1970 (age 56)
- Place of birth: Hohenems, Austria
- Height: 1.84 m (6 ft 0 in)
- Position: Midfielder

Team information
- Current team: Eintracht Frankfurt (head coach)

Youth career
- –1988: Rheindorf Altach

Senior career*
Years	Team	Apps	(Gls)
1988–1989	Grazer AK	3	(0)
1989–1991	LASK	52	(2)
1991–1992	Rheindorf Altach	34	(6)
1992–1993	Grazer AK	33	(10)
1993–2000	Austria Salzburg	201	(14)
2000–2002	Grazer AK	29	(2)
2002–2005	Kapfenberger SV	91	(17)
2005–2007	Red Bull Salzburg Juniors	40	(4)
Total		483	(55)

International career
1991	Austria U21	1	(0)
1994–1997	Austria	14	(3)

Managerial career
- 2008–2009: Red Bull Salzburg Juniors
- 2009–2012: Rheindorf Altach
- 2012–2014: SV Grödig
- 2014–2015: Red Bull Salzburg
- 2015–2018: Young Boys
- 2018–2021: Eintracht Frankfurt
- 2021–2022: Borussia Mönchengladbach
- 2023–2025: Monaco
- 2026–: Eintracht Frankfurt
- * Club domestic league appearances and goals

Adolf "Adi" Hütter (German pronunciation: [ˈʔadi ˈhʏtɐ]; born 11 February 1970) is an Austrian professional football coach and former player, he is the head coach of Bundesliga club Eintracht Frankfurt.

As a player, Hütter reached the 1993–94 UEFA Cup final, won the Austrian championship three times with SV Austria Salzburg and won the Austrian Cup with Grazer AK.

As a coach, he won the Austrian double, for the renamed Red Bull Salzburg, as well as the Swiss Super League with Young Boys. He then managed Eintracht Frankfurt from 2018 to 2021, Borussia Mönchengladbach for the 2021–22 season, and Monaco from 2023 to 2025, before returning to Eintracht Frankfurt in 2026.

== Playing career ==
Hütter played for SCR Altach in his youth before moving to Grazer AK and LASK. In 1993, he joined Austria Salzburg. With the club, he won the Austrian Bundesliga in the 1993–94, 1994–95 and 1996–97 seasons, and won the Austrian Supercup three times. He also reached the final of the 1993–94 UEFA Cup, where Salzburg lost 0–2 on aggregate against Inter Milan.

In 2000, Hütter joined Grazer AK again, where he won the 2001–02 Austrian Cup. After two years, he joined second division team Kapfenberger SV. In 2005, Hütter joined the second team of Red Bull Salzburg in the third division. Here, he was a leading player and won the 2006–07 Regionalliga West championship with the team, which also meant promotion to the second division. Hütter decided to end his playing career in August 2007 due to a persistent Achilles tendon injury, and became assistant coach of the Red Bull Salzburg Juniors.

== International career ==
Hütter played for the Austria national football team 14 times and scored 3 goals.

=== International stats ===
Appearances and goals by national team and year
National team	Year	Apps	Goals
Austria	1994	7	1
Austria	1995	3	2
Austria	1996	2	0
Austria	1997	2	0
Total		14	3

Scores and results list Austria's goal tally first.

No	Date	Venue	Opponent	Score	Result	Competition
1.	20 April 1994	Ernst-Happel-Stadion, Vienna, Austria	Scotland	1–0	1–2	Friendly match
2.	26 April 1995	Stadion Lehen, Salzburg, Austria	Liechtenstein	6–0	7–0	Euro 1996 qualifier
3.	26 April 1995	Stadion Lehen, Salzburg, Austria	Liechtenstein	7–0	7–0	Euro 1996 qualifier

== Coaching career ==
=== Salzburg Juniors, Altach, Grödig, Salzburg ===
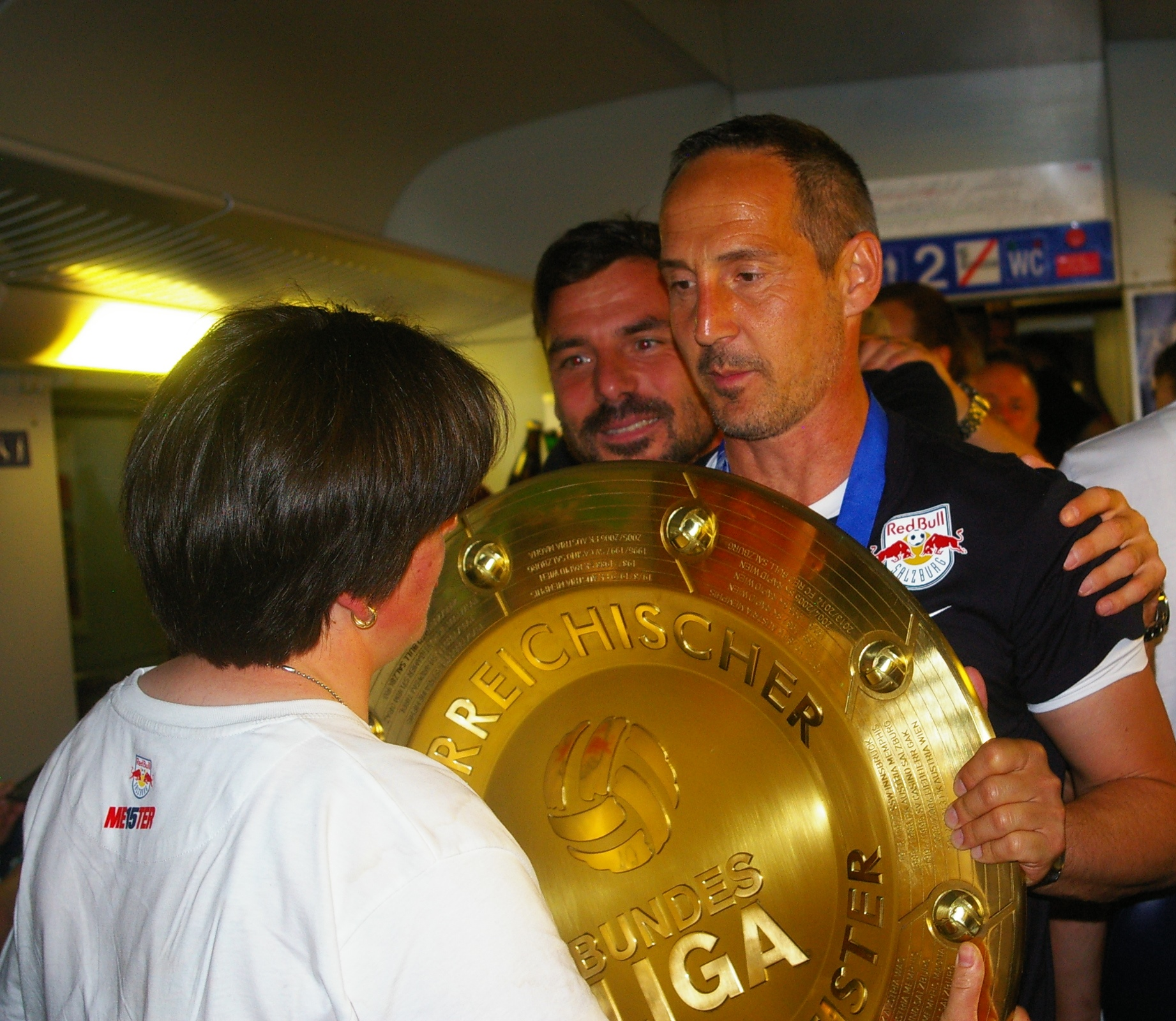
Hütter with the Austrian Bundesliga trophy in 2015 as manager of Red Bull Salzburg

After ending his playing career in 2007, Hütter became assistant coach of Red Bull Salzburg Juniors. He was appointed as the head coach of the Red Bull Juniors for the 2008–09 season, which he finished with a record of 13 wins, seven draws, and 15 losses.

In July 2009, he became head coach of SCR Altach, which had just been relegated to the second division, with the goal of leading them back to the Bundesliga. In the 2009–10 season, Altach lost to FC Pasching in the first round of the Austrian Cup and finished third in the league. In the 2010–11 season, Altach reached the round of 16 of the Austrian Cup and finished second in the league. After narrowly missing out on promotion two consecutive seasons, Altach was second in the league at the end of March 2012, eight matchdays before the end of the 2011–12 season. After a 0–2 loss to First Vienna on 3 April 2012, Hütter was sacked by Altach, as the club was of the opinion that a change in leadership was needed to secure promotion. However, Altach did not achieve promotion under Hütter's successor Edi Stöhr, again finishing the season in second place.

In April 2012, league rivals SV Grödig announced Hütter as head coach starting from 1 June 2012, replacing Heimo Pfeifenberger. Hütter signed a two-year contract. In the 2012–13 season, he won the second division with Grödig, securing promotion to the Bundesliga. In the 2013–14 season, which was Hütter's first season as a manager in the top-flight of Austrian football, he led Grödig to a third-place finish in the league after a 3–3 draw on the final matchday against Wacker Innsbruck, securing qualification for the 2014–15 UEFA Europa League. Grödig offered him a new contract at the end of the season, but Hütter declined the offer and left the club in summer 2014.

Hütter became the head coach of reigning Bundesliga champion Red Bull Salzburg for the 2014–15 season. He succeeded Roger Schmidt, who moved to Bayer Leverkusen. In his only season with Salzburg, he won the double consisting of the league title and the Austrian Cup. Despite these successes, Hütter and Salzburg terminated their contract by mutual consent in June 2015.

=== Young Boys ===
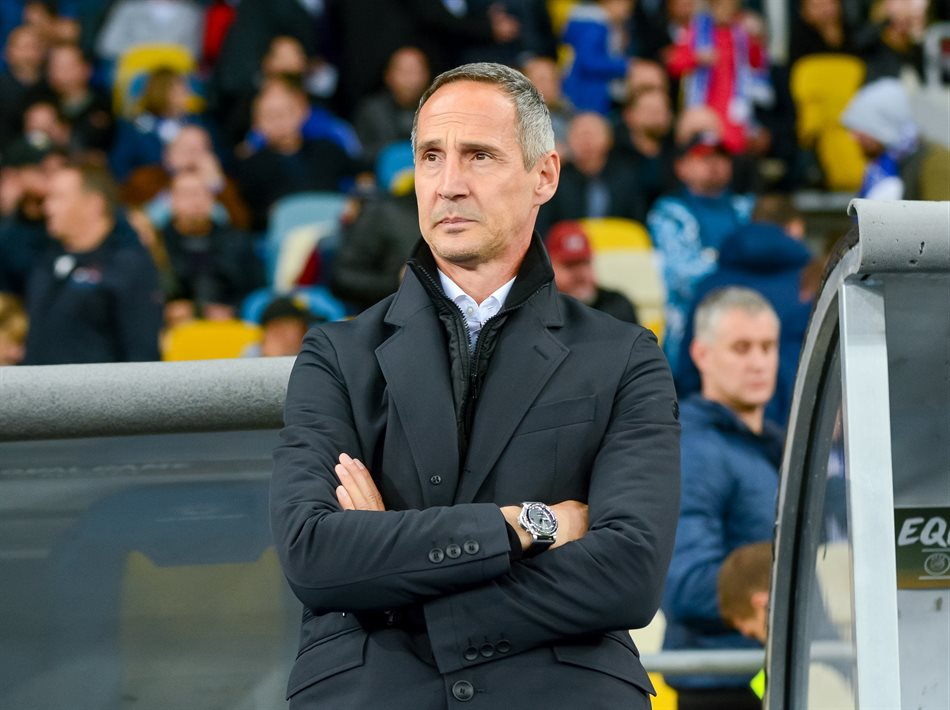
Hütter coaching Young Boys, 2017

In September 2015, Hütter took over as head coach of Swiss Super League side Young Boys. In both of his first two seasons, the club from Bern finished the league in second place. In the 2017–18 season, he led the club to its first league title since 1986, breaking the winning streak of Basel, which had previously won eight consecutive league titles. Hütter also reached the final of the 2017–18 Swiss Cup with Young Boys, which was lost 1–2 against FCZ.

=== Eintracht Frankfurt ===
On 16 May 2018, Hütter was confirmed to be Eintracht Frankfurt's new head coach for the 2018–19 season, succeeding Niko Kovač. He signed a three-year contract until June 2021. His first competitive match was the 2018 German Super Cup on 12 August 2018, which was lost 0–5 to Bayern Munich. On 18 August 2018, Eintracht Frankfurt were knocked out in the first round of the German Cup by fourth division team SSV Ulm. The start to the league season was also poor, with just four points in five matchdays, but Hütter was able to turn the negative trend around, as Eintracht did not lose in the next eleven games, winning ten, in the Bundesliga and Europa League. In the Europa League, Frankfurt won all six matches in the group stage and won against Shakhtar Donetsk, Inter Milan and Benfica in the knockout phase. Their run lasted until the semi-final, in which they drew twice and lost on penalties against Chelsea. At the end of the season, Hütter was voted by readers of German newspaper Bild as Coach of the Year while Eintracht Frankfurt was voted as the Team of the Year. The union of professional football players also voted Hütter as Coach of the Year.

In the 2019–20 Bundesliga season, Frankfurt finished in ninth place in the league. They also reached the semi-finals of the DFB-Pokal. In the Europa League, they finished second in the group stage, with notable wins including a 2–1 away victory against Arsenal. However, their journey ended in the round of 16 with a defeat against Basel.

Ahead of the 2020–21 season, Frankfurt extended the contracts of Hütter and his assistant coaches for two more years until June 2023. Despite initially holding a Champions League position, the team ultimately finished the league in fifth place and qualified for the Europa League once again.

=== Borussia Mönchengladbach ===
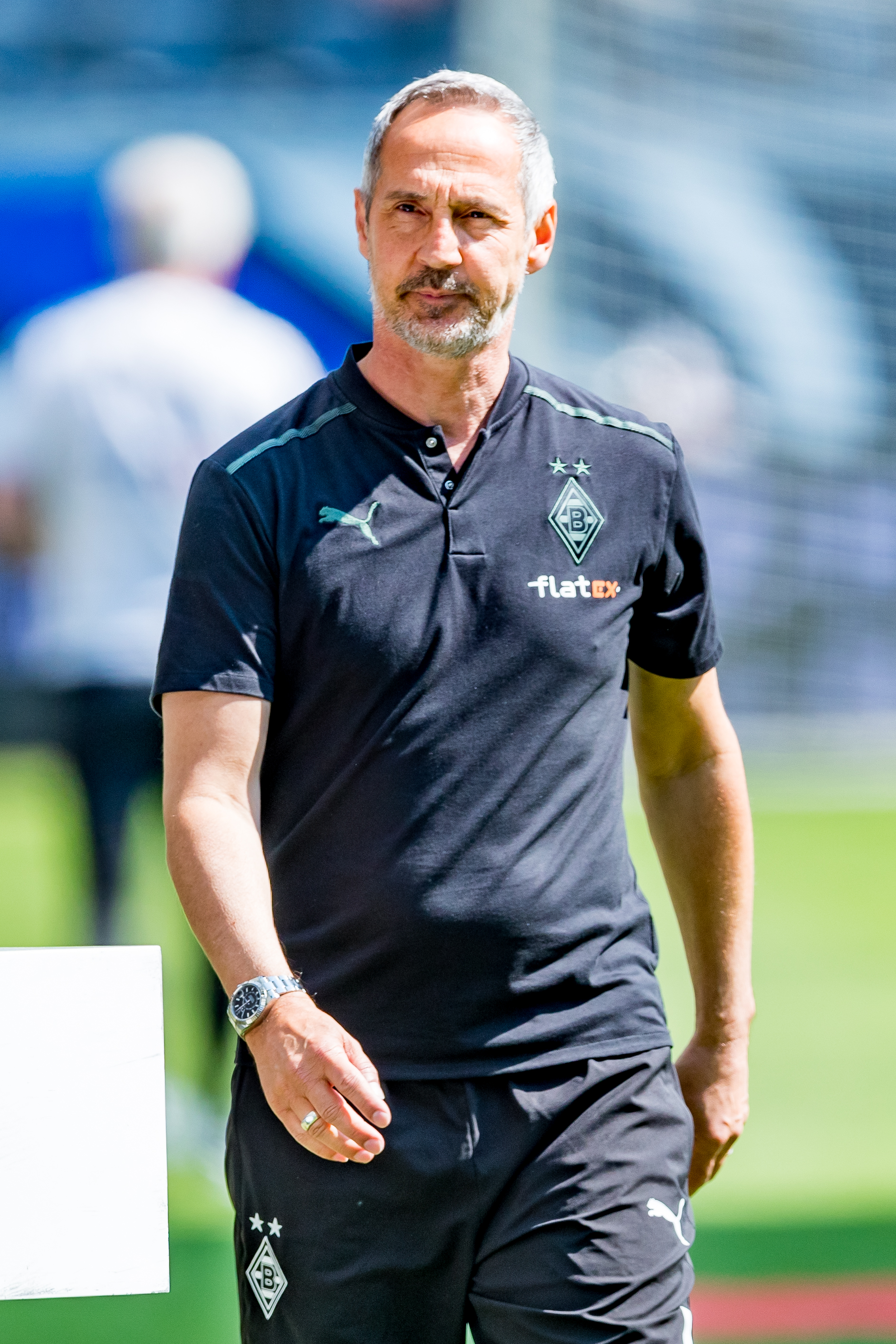
Hütter coaching Borussia Mönchengladbach in 2022

On 13 April 2021, Hütter announced that he would leave Frankfurt using a buy-out clause and join Borussia Mönchengladbach for the 2021–22 season. Gladbach was ranked 14th after the first half of the season, just three points above the relegation zone. The results stabilized in 2022, with Gladbach reaching seventh place in the second half of the season. Overall, the club finished on tenth place, two positions lower than in the previous campaign under Marco Rose. On 14 May 2022, Hütter announced he was to leave Mönchengladbach after the season's conclusion by mutual consent with the club's leadership. He was succeeded by Daniel Farke.

A highlight of Hütter's one season came in the second round of the DFB-Pokal, where Mönchengladbach won 5–0 at home to Bayern Munich on 27 October 2021. Bayern had scored in each of their previous 85 games, and suffered their biggest defeat since 1978.

=== Monaco ===
On 4 July 2023, Hütter signed a two-year deal at Ligue 1 team Monaco, which had not qualified for a European competition in the previous season, succeeding Philippe Clement. His debut was a 4–2 win at Clermont on 13 August. He guided the club to a runner-up finish in the 2023–24 season, and qualification to the Champions League group stage for the first time since 2018–19.

In the 2024–25 season, the club secured a third-place finish and second consecutive Champions League qualification. On 9 October 2025, Hütter was sacked after a poor run of form.

=== Return to Eintracht Frankfurt ===
On 31 May 2026, Hütter returned as head coach of Eintracht Frankfurt, signing a contract that runs until 2029.

== Personal life ==
Hütter is married and has one daughter. Hütter's grandmother persuaded his parents to name their son Adolf, in memory of his uncle, who died at the age of 27 in a rock avalanche. However, he is always called by his nickname "Adi", almost certainly due to the name Adolf being commonly associated with Adolf Hitler.

== Managerial statistics ==
As of match played 21 November 2026

Managerial record by team and tenure
Team	Nat	From	To	Record					Ref
Team	Nat	From	To	G	W	D	L	Win %	Ref
Red Bull Salzburg Juniors	(Austria)	30 May 2008	30 June 2009	35	13	7	15	37.14	
Rheindorf Altach	(Austria)	1 July 2009	6 April 2012	102	58	21	23	56.86	
SV Grödig	(Austria)	1 June 2012	31 May 2014	75	39	16	20	52.00	
Red Bull Salzburg	(Austria)	1 June 2014	15 June 2015	54	35	8	11	64.81	
Young Boys	(Switzerland)	3 September 2015	30 June 2018	133	78	27	28	58.65	
Eintracht Frankfurt	(Germany)	1 July 2018	30 June 2021	141	67	32	42	47.52	
Borussia Mönchengladbach	(Germany)	1 July 2021	16 May 2022	37	14	9	14	37.84	
Monaco	(France)	4 July 2023	9 October 2025	93	48	21	24	51.61	
Eintracht Frankfurt	(Germany)	31 May 2026	Present	12	6	3	3	50.00	
Total				682	358	144	180	52.49	—

== Honours ==
=== Player ===
Austria Salzburg

- Austrian Bundesliga: 1993–94, 1994–95, 1996–97
- Austrian Cup runner-up: 1999–2000
- Austrian Supercup: 1994, 1995, 1997
- UEFA Cup runner-up: 1993–94

Grazer AK

- Austrian Cup: 2001–02
- 2. Division: 1992–93

=== Coach ===
SV Grödig

- Erste Liga: 2012–13

Red Bull Salzburg

- Austrian Bundesliga: 2014–15
- Austrian Cup: 2014–15

Young Boys

- Swiss Super League: 2017–18
- Swiss Cup runner-up: 2017–18

Eintracht Frankfurt

- DFL-Supercup runner-up: 2018

Individual

- VDV Bundesliga Coach of the Season: 2018–19, 2020-21
