= NK Vrapče =

Croatian football club

- Full name: NK Vrapče
- Founded: 1938
- Ground: Igralište Vrapča
- Capacity: 1.000
- Manager: Denis Bezer
- League: Treća HNL West
- 2021–22: Treća HNL West, 11th
| Home colours | Away colours |

NK Vrapče is a Croatian football club founded in 1938, in Zagreb's neighbourhood Vrapče which is situated in west part of the city. Its characteristic colors are blue and yellow.

In seasons of 1992–1997, NK Vrapče played in Croatian Second League and that was the biggest success of this club. In June 2020 they appointed former Casino Salzburg player Damir Mužek as sports director.

== Players ==
=== Current squad ===
As of 25 April 2023

Note: Flags indicate national team as defined under FIFA eligibility rules; some limited exceptions apply. Players may hold more than one non-FIFA nationality.

| No. | Pos. | Nation | Player |
|---|---|---|---|
| 1 | GK | (Croatia) CRO | Josip Šulentić |
| 1 | GK | (United States) USA | Craig Szczuka |
| 3 | DF | (Croatia) CRO | Igor Nikšić |
| 4 | DF | (Croatia) CRO | Frane Vučemilović-Vranjić |
| 5 | | (Croatia) CRO | Karlo Perinić |
| 6 | DF | (Croatia) CRO | Domagoj Gracin |
| 7 | | (Brazil) BRA | Diego Maciel Florentino |
| 8 | MF | (Croatia) CRO | Lovro Bošnjak |
| 9 | | (Croatia) CRO | Bruno Bajan |
| 10 | MF | (Croatia) CRO | Marin Tomšić |
| 11 | MF | (Croatia) CRO | Dorian Houdek |

| No. | Pos. | Nation | Player |
|---|---|---|---|
| 12 | GK | (Croatia) CRO | Ivan Ševerdija |
| 13 | MF | (Croatia) CRO | Victor Marić |
| 14 | | (Croatia) CRO | Bartol Markušić |
| 15 | | (Croatia) CRO | Ivan Milković |
| 16 | MF | (Croatia) CRO | Gabriel Cigrovski |
| 17 | | (Croatia) CRO | Ivan Pađen |
| 18 | MF | (Croatia) CRO | Matej Ćosić |
| 20 | DF | (Croatia) CRO | Antonio Kćira |
| 23 | DF | (Croatia) CRO | Mursel Smakiqi |
| 25 | FW | (Croatia) CRO | Bruno Špišić |
