= Wolfgang Feiersinger =

Austrian footballer

Personal information
- Date of birth: 30 January 1965 (age 61)
- Place of birth: Saalfelden, Austria
- Height: 1.83 m (6 ft 0 in)
- Position: Defender

Youth career
- Saalfeldner SK

Senior career*
Years	Team	Apps	(Gls)
1989–1996	Austria Salzburg	287	(14)
1996–2000	Borussia Dortmund	57	(0)
2000–2001	LASK Linz	25	(1)
2001–2002	Austria Salzburg	18	(0)
2002–2004	PSV SW Salzburg	42	(0)
2005–2006	SPG Saalfelden	1	(0)
Total		430	(15)

International career
1990–1999	Austria	46	(0)

Managerial career
- 2003–2004: PSV SW Salzburg
- 2005–2008: Austria Salzburg U17
- * Club domestic league appearances and goals

Wolfgang Feiersinger (born 30 January 1965) is an Austrian former professional footballer who played as a defender.

== Club career ==
Feiersinger started his professional career in 1986 with Austria Salzburg and stayed with them for ten years, winning two league titles during the club's most successful period. In 1994, he played with them in the UEFA Cup final against Inter Milan. During the 1996–97 season he joined German side Borussia Dortmund and immediately won the Champions League with them, playing both legs of the semi-final against Manchester United but missing out on the Final squad altogether because Matthias Sammer returned from injury to claim his place. Feiersinger also won the Intercontinental Cup with Dortmund later that year.

In 2000, he returned to Austria and signed for LASK Linz only to move to back to Salzburg after only one season in Linz. After one other season with Austria he finished his career with lower league PSV SW Salzburg.

== International career ==
Feiersinger made his debut for Austria in an August 1990 friendly match against Switzerland and went on to earn 46 caps, scoring no goals. His last international was an April 1999 European Championship qualification match against San Marino. Feiersinger was a member of the Austrian team at the 1998 FIFA World Cup, he played in all three matches. Also, he played in 15 World Cup qualification games.

== Personal life ==
Feiersinger's eldest daughter Denise Feiersinger is a retired biathlon athlete turned fashion designer, while his younger daughter Laura is a professional football player as well. She plays for 1. FC Köln and represented the Austria women's national team from 2010 to 2025.

== Honours ==
Austria Salzburg

- Austrian Bundesliga: 1993–94, 1994–95
- Austrian Supercup: 1994, 1995

Borussia Dortmund

- UEFA Champions League: 1996–97
- Intercontinental Cup: 1997
