= Otto Barić =

Croatian footballer and manager (1933–2020)

Personal information
- Date of birth: 19 June 1933
- Place of birth: Eisenkappel, Austria
- Date of death: 13 December 2020 (aged 87)
- Place of death: Zagreb, Croatia

Youth career
- 1946–1952: Dinamo Zagreb

Senior career*
Years	Team	Apps	(Gls)
1952–1958	Metalac Zagreb		
1958–1963	Lokomotiva Zagreb		

Managerial career
- 1964–1967: Lokomotiva Zagreb
- 1967–1969: Opel Rüsselsheim
- 1969–1970: Germania Wiesbaden
- 1970–1972: Wacker Innsbruck
- 1972–1974: LASK Linz
- 1974–1976: NK Zagreb
- 1974–1979: Yugoslavia (amateurs)
- 1976–1979: Dinamo Vinkovci
- 1980–1982: Sturm Graz
- 1982–1985: Rapid Vienna
- 1985–1986: VfB Stuttgart
- 1986–1988: Rapid Vienna
- 1988–1989: Sturm Graz
- 1990–1991: Vorwärts Steyr
- 1991–1995: Casino Salzburg
- 1995–1996: Croatia (assistant)
- 1996–1997: Croatia Zagreb
- 1997–1998: Fenerbahçe S.K.
- 1998–1999: LASK Linz
- 1999–2001: Austria
- 2002–2004: Croatia
- 2006–2007: Albania
Medal record
Representing Yugoslavia (as manager)
Mediterranean Games
Gold medal – first place	1979 Split
- * Club domestic league appearances and goals

Otto Barić (Croatian pronunciation: [bǎːritɕ]; 19 June 1933 – 13 December 2020) was an Austrian-Croatian professional football player and manager.

== Coaching career ==
=== 1970s to 1980s ===
Born in Eisenkappel, near Klagenfurt, Barić started his coaching career in 1969 at West German club Germania Wiesbaden and moved after one season to Austrian club Wacker Innsbruck, where he spent next two seasons and won two consecutive league champions titles before moving to LASK Linz in July 1972. After two seasons with Linz, he went on to coach Croatian club NK Zagreb and spent two seasons there before moving to Dinamo Vinkovci in July 1976. In the late 1970s, he was also the head coach of the Yugoslav amateur national team, a team that consisted of players from the Yugoslav Second League, and won two regional and one continental title with the team between 1976 and 1978. At the same time, he spent almost four seasons at Dinamo Vinkovci before returning to Austria in March 1980 to coach Sturm Graz. He spent one and a half seasons with Sturm and was then unemployed for a year before starting to coach Rapid Wien in July 1982. He led Rapid to three champions titles in the Austrian Bundesliga in 1982, 1983 and 1987, as well as to three Austrian Cup titles in 1983, 1984 and 1985. In 1985, he also led Rapid to the final match of the UEFA Cup Winners' Cup, but lost the title with a 3–1 defeat against Everton.

Barić left Rapid for German club VfB Stuttgart in the summer of 1985 and coached the team until March 1986. After three months without a job, he returned to Rapid in June 1986 and went on to coach the team in the following two seasons, winning another Austrian Cup title in 1987. After leaving Rapid in June 1988, he was unemployed for five months before eventually continuing to work as the head coach of Sturm Graz between November 1988 and June 1989.

=== 1990s ===
After leaving Sturm, Barić became head coach of SK Vorwärts Steyr, another team of the Austrian Bundesliga, for the 1990–91 season. In July 1991, he was engaged by Austria Salzburg. He led Austria Salzburg to two consecutive champions titles in the Austrian Bundesliga in 1994 and 1995, and also managed to qualify for the UEFA Champions League in 1994, thus making Austria Salzburg the first Austrian club to do that. The team finished third in their group behind Ajax Amsterdam and A.C. Milan. In the previous 1993–94 season, he led the club to the two-legged final of the UEFA Cup, but lost the title to Inter Milan with a 2–0 defeat on aggregate. He coached the Salzburg team until August 1995 and then he left due to differences of opinion between him and some players.

He was jobless for a short time after leaving Austria Salzburg and then he worked as an assistant coach in the Croatia national team until the end of the 1996 European Championship. In July 1996, he became the head coach of Dinamo Zagreb and led the club to titles in both the Croatian First League and Croatian Cup in only one season he coached the team. In June 1997, he left Dinamo for Turkish club Fenerbahçe, where he worked until March 1999. Barić was then unemployed for a couple of months after leaving Fenerbahçe and subsequently returned to his international career as the head coach of the Austria national team between 1999 and 2001, giving up his position after Austria failed to qualify for the 2002 World Cup finals.

=== 2000s ===
In January 2002, Barić went on to coach Austria Salzburg for four months and was then jobless for two months until July 2002, when he was named the head coach of the Croatia national team after his predecessor Mirko Jozić was dismissed due to unsuccessful campaign of the team at the 2002 World Cup finals.

=== Croatia national team ===
In July 2002, Barić signed a two-year contract with the Croatian Football Federation and was given a task to bring the Croatia national team to the finals of UEFA Euro 2004. His first match as manager at Croatia bench was a friendly against Wales on 21 August 2002 in Varaždin. The match ended with a 1–1 draw, which was quite a disappointment. His competitive debut in the qualifying session for the European Championship was even less successful with a goalless draw against Estonia and one month later the team went on to lose 2–0 against Bulgaria. With diminished chances for advancement to the final tournament, Croatia now had to win as many matches as possible. The start in the year 2003 was successful, with an impressive 4–0 win over solid Belgium at home in Zagreb, followed by three consecutive wins, twice against the group underdogs Andorra and once against Estonia. The team had to achieve an away win against Belgium to secure at least a place in the play-offs, but failed to do that by losing 2–1. Nevertheless, they won the last match against Bulgaria by 1–0 and grabbed the second place due to a better goal difference from that of the Belgian team. In the play-offs, Croatia came to a 2–1 win on aggregate against Slovenia and qualified for the finals in Portugal.

At the finals, Croatia was drawn into a tough group with defending champions France, England and Switzerland, and advancement to the quarterfinals was relatively unlikely. The team put all their hopes on the opening match against Switzerland, but failed to win as the match ended with a goalless draw. The second match against France started badly for the Croatian team as they were 1–0 down on the halftime after Igor Tudor scored an own goal, but a strong start into the second half and goals from Milan Rapaić and Dado Pršo put them 2–1 up in the first seven minutes. Nevertheless, France equalised with David Trezeguet's goal twelve minutes later and the final score was 2–2. Croatia had to win against England in the last group match to advance to the quarterfinals and managed to achieve a good start when Niko Kovač scored the opening goal after only four minutes, but England managed to switch the lead 2–1 until the end of the first half with goals from Paul Scholes and Wayne Rooney in the last five minutes. In the second half, England went 3–1 up with another goal from Rooney and Croatian chances to put themselves in the lead once again were down to a minimum. Croatia managed to decrease England's lead when Igor Tudor scored for 3–2, but it took only six minutes before Frank Lampard scored the final goal of the match, leading England to a 4–2 win and eliminating the group third-placed Croatia from the tournament. Given that Croatia was expected to progress from the group, the early exit was seen as a major disappointment and Barić's contract was not extended and he left as manager of the Croatia national team in July 2004.

=== Albania national team ===
After being without a job for nearly two years, Barić returned to coaching as he was named manager of the Albania national team in June 2006, after Hans-Peter Briegel's contract with the team was not extended. Barić stayed on until the 2008 European Championship with hopes to take the team to the final tournament for the first time. Unlike his predecessor, Barić lived in Tirana to closely watch the Albanian First Division and its players.

He debuted with a 2–2 draw against Belarus on 2 September 2006. Then Albania went on to lose 2–0 at home against Romania, but the draws against Bulgaria and Slovenia, and the wins 6–0 on aggregate against Luxembourg, showed the results of his work. Albania might have even won with the Netherlands in Tirana if an own goal of Dutch defender Melchiot would have not been disallowed by the referee. Barić's values were shown even when he promised to renew the Albania national team and somehow managed to do that. He left out of the squad captain Igli Tare, even though he was a player of Lazio. But he proved this decision right because the team managed to do really well without him. He also gave their debuts to Tirana 19-year-old player, Jahmir Hyka, and 20-year-old Besa Kavajë player, Andi Lila, not to mention 21-year-old Kristi Vangjeli, who plays for Aris in Greece. But the Euro 2008 qualifying campaign ended in shame for Albania, following two heavy losses against Belarus (2–4 at home) and Romania (1–6 in Bucharest). Although Barić was suspended for these two matches and both were not directed by him, but by his assistant, he could not accept his player's behavior and announced his withdrawal although he had agreed to an extension of his contract some days before.

== Death ==
Barić died from COVID-19 at Clinical Hospital Dubrava in Zagreb on 13 December 2020, aged 87.

== Managerial statistics ==
Team	From	To	Record				
Team	From	To	G	W	D	L	Win %
Lokomotiva Zagreb	1964	1967					
Opel Rüsselsheim	1967	1969					
Germania Wiesbaden	1969	1970					
Wacker Innsbruck	1 January 1971	31 December 1971	66	24	20	22	36.36
LASK Linz	1972	1974	66	24	20	22	36.36
NK Zagreb	1974	1976					
Yugoslavia Amateurs	1974	1979	8	6	1	1	75.00
Dinamo Vinkovci	1976	1979					
Sturm Graz	1 July 1980	30 June 1982	79	34	18	27	43.04
Rapid Wien	1 July 1982	30 June 1985	137	86	36	15	62.77
Stuttgart	1 July 1985	4 March 1986	28	13	6	9	46.43
Rapid Wien	1 July 1986	11 September 1988	139	85	33	21	61.15
Sturm Graz	1 October 1988	30 June 1989	28	14	6	8	50.00
Vorwärts Steyr	28 July 1990	3 May 1991	33	9	11	13	27.27
Casino Salzburg	11 July 1991	29 August 1995	191	105	48	38	54.97
Croatia Zagreb	6 June 1996	2 June 1997	41	34	5	2	82.93
Fenerbahçe	1997	1998	41	24	9	8	58.54
LASK Linz	29 July 1998	4 December 1998	19	11	2	6	57.89
Austria	13 April 1999	21 November 2001	22	7	6	9	31.82
Croatia	July 2002	July 2004	24	11	8	5	45.83
Albania	16 August 2006	21 November 2007	15	4	5	6	26.67
Totals			937	491	234	212	52.40

== Honours ==
Wacker Innsbruck

- Austrian Bundesliga: 1970–71, 1971–72

NK Zagreb

- Yugoslav Second League: 1975–76

Yugoslavia

- Mediterranean Games: 1979

Rapid Vienna

- Austrian Bundesliga: 1982–83, 1986–87, 1987–88
- Austrian Cup: 1983, 1984, 1985, 1987
- Austrian Supercup: 1986, 1987, 1988
- European Cup Winners' Cup runner-up: 1985

Casino Salzburg

- Austrian Bundesliga: 1993–94, 1994–95
- Austrian Supercup: 1994, 1995
- UEFA Cup runner-up: 1994

Croatia Zagreb

- Croatian First League: 1996–97
- Croatian Cup: 1997

== See also ==
- List of football managers with the most matches
