= Manfred Wachter =

Austrian footballer and manager

Personal information
- Date of birth: 25 September 1969 (age 57)
- Height: 1.76 m (5 ft 9 1/2 in)
- Position: Midfielder

Senior career*
| Years | Team | Apps | (Gls) |
| –1993 | VfB Mödling | 14 | (2) |
| 1993–1994 | SR Donaufeld | 3 | (1) |
| 1994–1998 | First Vienna FC | 79 | (17) |
| 1998–1999 | SKN St. Pölten | 33 | (8) |
| 1999–2000 | SV Würmla | 15 | (4) |
| 2000 | First Vienna FC | 6 | (0) |
| 2000–2001 | SC/ESV Parndorf | | |
| 2001–2005 | SC Retz | 117 | (16) |

Managerial career
- 2004–2005: SC Retz (player-coach)
- 2008–2009: SC Himberg
- 2009–2010: SV Langenrohr
- 2010–2011: ASK Schwadorf
- 2011–2014: SC Retz
- 2014: SC Mannsdorf
- 2015–: SC Neusiedl am See 1919
- * Club domestic league appearances and goals

Manfred Wachter (born 25 September 1969) is an Austrian football manager and former footballer who played as a midfielder.
