= Vrapče =

Neighbourhood of Zagreb, Croatia

Coordinates: 45°48.9′N 15°53.9′E

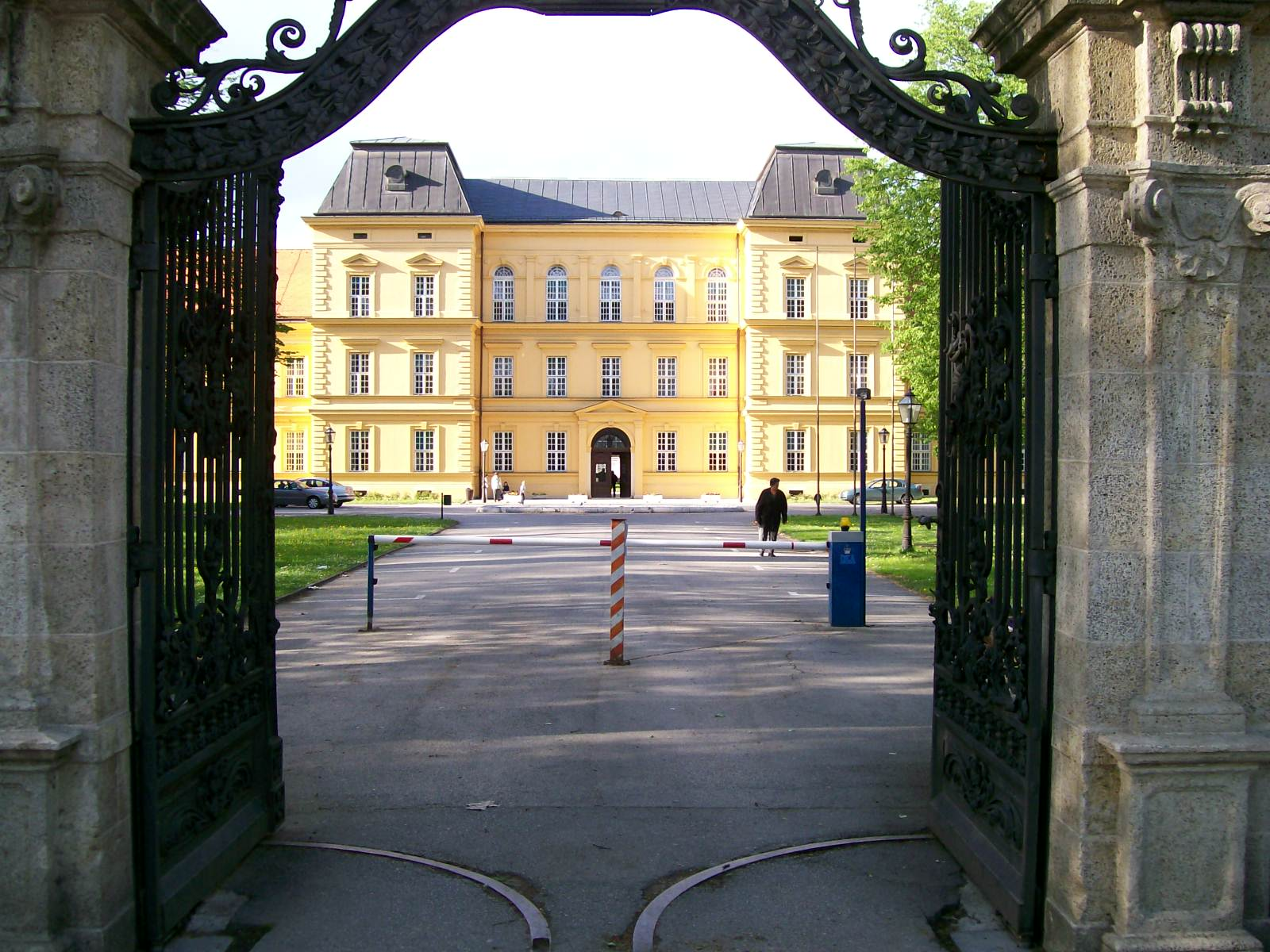
Psychiatric Hospital Vrapče

Vrapče (pronounced [ʋrǎptʃe]) is a neighborhood of western Zagreb, the capital of Croatia. It is administratively part of the district Podsused—Vrapče. Vrapče consists of Donje Vrapče (lit. Lower Vrapče) and Gornje Vrapče (lit. Upper Vrapče). Gornje Vrapče is an eponymous local administrative unit, while the other is called Vrapče - centar.

The population of Vrapče is not recorded separately from the rest of the district, which has a total population of 45,759. The population of Gornje Vrapče is 4,469, while the population of Vrapče - centar is 7,634.

The football team NK Vrapče plays in this neighbourhood.
