= Nikola Jurčević =

Croatian footballer and manager

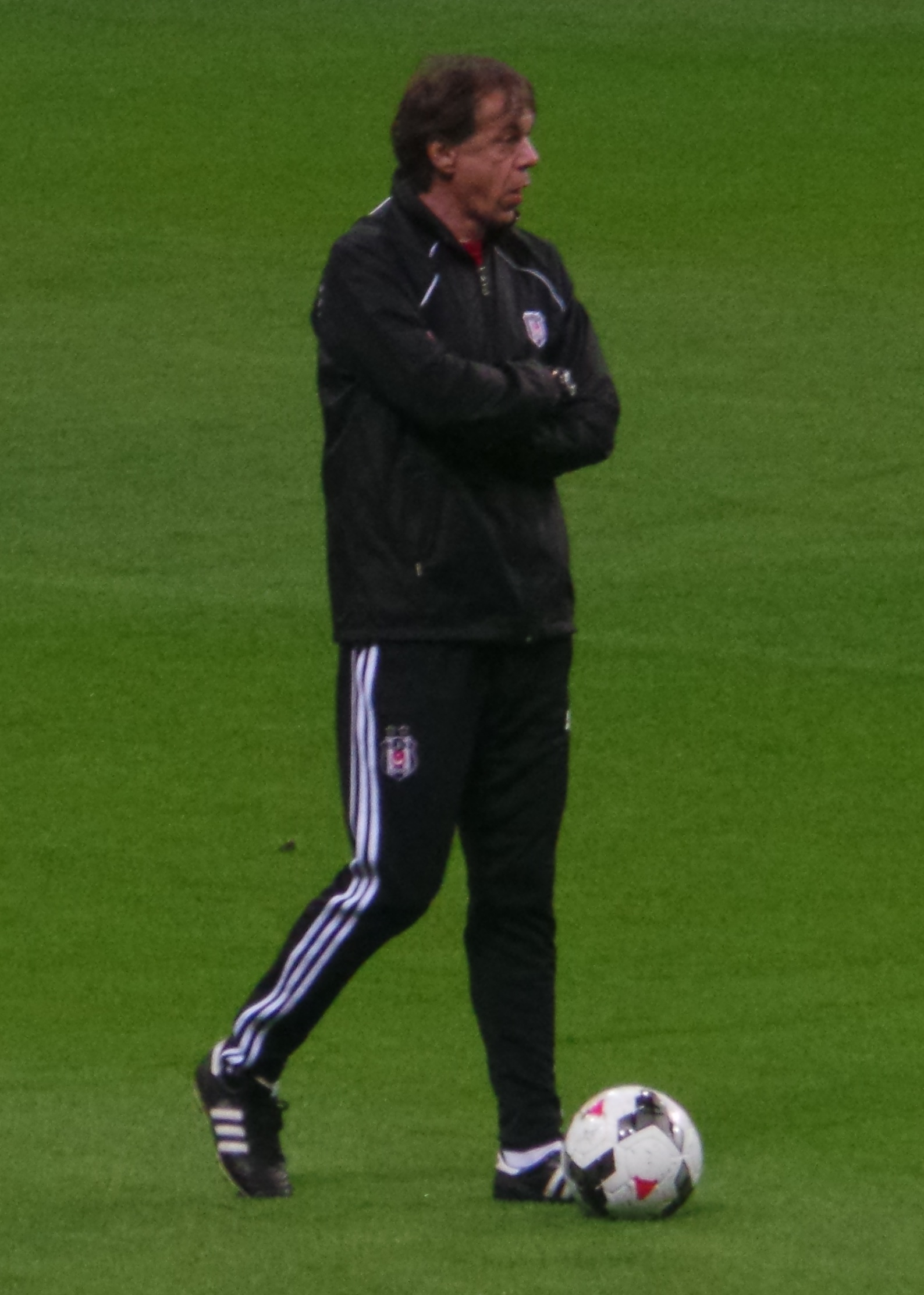
- Jurčević in training

Personal information
- Date of birth: 14 September 1966 (age 60)
- Place of birth: Zagreb, SR Croatia, SFR Yugoslavia
- Height: 1.82 m (6 ft 0 in)
- Positions: Forward; midfielder

Youth career
- Dinamo Zagreb

Senior career*
Years	Team	Apps	(Gls)
1984–1986	Dinamo Zagreb	4	(0)
1986–1988	NK Zagreb		
1988–1989	Antwerp	1	(0)
1989–1991	NK Zagreb	33	(25)
1991–1995	Austria Salzburg	130	(42)
1995–1997	SC Freiburg	45	(5)
1997–1999	Austria Salzburg	31	(4)
Total		211	(51)

International career
1990–1991	Croatia (unofficial)	2	(0)
1994–1996	Croatia	17	(2)

Managerial career
- 2002–2003: NK Zagreb
- 2003–2004: Dinamo Zagreb
- 2005: Austria Salzburg
- 2005: Slaven Belupo
- 2006–2012: Croatia (assistant)
- 2012–2013: Lokomotiv Moscow (assistant)
- 2013–2015: Beşiktaş (assistant)
- 2015–2017: West Ham United (assistant)
- 2018: Dinamo Zagreb
- 2019: Azerbaijan
- 2023: Lebanon
- 2026–: Croatia (assistant)
- * Club domestic league appearances and goals

Nikola Jurčević (born 14 September 1966) is a Croatian professional football manager and former player.

== Playing career ==
Jurčević made his debut for Croatia in a December 1990 friendly match against Romania, coming on as a 66th-minute substitute for Ivan Cvjetković, and earned a total of 19 caps (2 unofficial), scoring 2 goals. Since Croatia was still officially part of Yugoslavia at the time, his first two games were unofficial. His final international was a December 1996 friendly against Morocco.

== Managerial career ==
Jurčević started as a manager of NK Zagreb in 2002, but a year later he became the manager for Dinamo Zagreb. He celebrated the Prva HNL and Croatian Cup in 2004. Later, he managed NK Slaven Belupo. He also worked as an assistant manager for the Croatia national team, assisting his former international teammates Slaven Bilić and Aljoša Asanović.

On 18 September 2015, he was appointed as the assistant manager to Bilić at West Ham United. He left the club along with Bilić's other coaching staff when the manager was sacked on 6 November 2017. On 12 March 2018, he was named the manager of Croatian First Football League club Dinamo Zagreb, but he was sacked by club on 15 May 2018, after poor performance in the club.

On 11 February 2019, he was named the new head coach for the Azerbaijan national team. On 13 December 2019, he was sacked as manager of the Azerbaijan national team due to the team's poor performance in the UEFA Euro 2020 qualifying, despite managing a respectable 1–1 draw to his home country Croatia at home.

On 2 October 2023, Jurčević was appointed head coach of the Lebanon national team ahead of the 2023 AFC Asian Cup and 2026 FIFA World Cup qualification. However, just two months into the role, Jurčević left the Lebanon national team just a month before the tournament began, by "mutual consent".

== Career statistics ==
=== International ===
Appearances and goals by national team and year
National team	Year	Apps	Goals
Croatia	1990	1	0
Croatia	1991	1	0
Croatia	1992	0	0
Croatia	1993	0	0
Croatia	1994	4	1
Croatia	1995	4	1
Croatia	1996	9	0
Total		19	2

Scores and results list Croatia's goal tally first, score column indicates score after each Jurčević goal.

List of international goals scored by Nikola Jurčević
No.	Date	Venue	Opponent	Score	Result	Competition
1	17 August 1994	Ramat Gan, Ramat Gan, Israel	Israel	3 – 0	4 – 0	Friendly
2	15 November 1995	Bežigrad, Ljubljana, Slovenia	Slovenia	2 – 1	2 – 1	Euro 1996 Qualifying

=== Managerial ===
As of match played 21 November 2023

Managerial record by team and tenure
Team	From	To	Record				
Team	From	To	P	W	D	L	Win %
NK Zagreb	2002	2003	32	8	9	15	25.0
Dinamo Zagreb	2003	2004	54	32	15	7	59.3
Red Bull Salzburg	2005	2005	6	1	0	5	16.7
Slaven Belupo	2005	2005	18	6	4	8	33.3
Dinamo Zagreb	12 March 2018	15 May 2018	12	5	2	5	41.7
Azerbaijan	11 February 2019	13 December 2019	10	1	2	7	10.0
Lebanon	2 October 2023	8 December 2023	4	0	2	2	0.0
Total			136	53	34	49	39.0

== Honours ==
=== Player ===
NK Zagreb

- Yugoslav Third League (West): 1989–90
- Yugoslav Second League: 1990–91

Austria Salzburg

- Austrian Bundesliga: 1993–94, 1994–95
- UEFA Cup Runner-up: 1993–94

Individual

- Austrian Bundesliga top scorer: 1993–94

=== Manager ===
Dinamo Zagreb

- Croatian Super Cup: 2003
- Croatian Cup: 2004
