= Herbert Ilsanker =

Austrian footballer

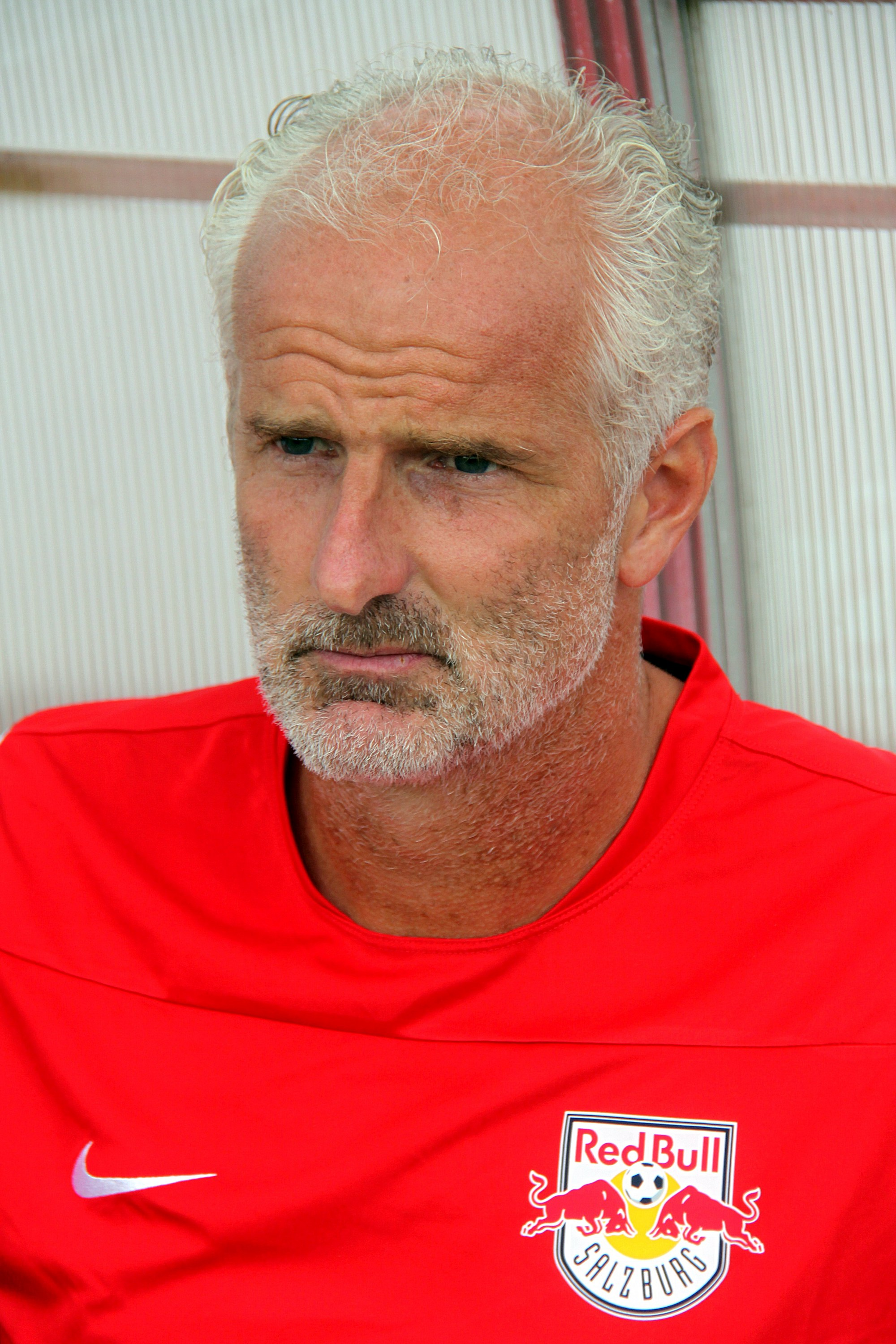
- Ilsanker in 2014

Personal information
- Date of birth: 24 May 1967 (age 59)
- Place of birth: Hallein, Austria
- Height: 1.95 m (6 ft 5 in)
- Position: Goalkeeper

Team information
- Current team: Red Bull Salzburg (goalkeeper coach)

Youth career
- –1993: SK Hallein

Senior career*
Years	Team	Apps	(Gls)
1993–1998	SV Austria Salzburg		
1998–2001	Mainz 05		

Managerial career
- 2006–: Red Bull Salzburg (goalkeeper coach)
- * Club domestic league appearances and goals

Herbert Ilsanker (born 24 May 1967) is an Austrian former professional football goalkeeper. Since 2005, he has been goalkeeper coach of Red Bull Salzburg.

== Career ==
Ilsanker started his career with his local club SK Hallein. Afterwards he was transferred to SV Austria Salzburg where he spent most of his active career (1993–1998). For Salzburg he played 98 matches. From 1998 till the end of his career 2001 he played with the German side Mainz 05 where he was teammate of Jürgen Klopp, now coach of Liverpool.

== Personal life ==
He is the father of Stefan Ilsanker.

== Honours ==
=== Player ===
SV Austria Salzburg

- Austrian Champion: 1995, 1997
- Austrian Supercup: 1995, 1997

=== Coach ===
Red Bull Salzburg

- Austrian Champion: 2007, 2008, 2010, 2012
- Austrian Cup: 2012
