= Christian Kraiger =

Austrian footballer and manager

Personal information
- Date of birth: 11 August 1973 (age 53)
- Place of birth: Gösselsdorf, Austria
- Height: 1.80 m (5 ft 11 in)
- Position: Defender

Youth career
- –1994: Casino Salzburg

Senior career*
Years	Team	Apps	(Gls)
1993–1994	Casino Salzburg	3	(0)
1994–1995	Grazer AK	2	(0)
1995–1996	FC Braunau	15	(1)
1996–1997	FC Admira Wacker Mödling	7	(0)
1997–2000	FC Braunau	82	(6)
2000–2001	ASKÖ Pasching		
2001–2011	SAK Klagenfurt	96	(13)

International career
1994	Austria U21	7	(2)

Managerial career
- 2014–2015: SAK Klagenfurt (assistant manager)
- * Club domestic league appearances and goals

Christian Kraiger (born 11 August 1973) is an Austrian football manager and former player who played as a defender.
