= Peter Artner =

Austrian footballer (born 1966)

Personal information
- Date of birth: 20 May 1966 (age 60)
- Place of birth: Vienna, Austria
- Height: 1.77 m (5 ft 10 in)
- Position: Defender

Youth career
- Landhaus
- Donau

Senior career*
Years	Team	Apps	(Gls)
1984–1986	Austria Wien	6	(0)
1986–1987	→ First Vienna (loan)	20	(1)
1987–1993	Admira/Wacker	187	(23)
1993–1996	Wüstenrot Salzburg	82	(7)
1996–1997	Hércules Alicante	13	(0)
1997	Foggia	10	(0)
1998	VSE Skt Pölten	17	(0)
1998–2000	FCN Skt Pölten	57	(3)
2000–2001	SKN St. Pölten	23	(0)
Total		415	(34)

International career
1987–1996	Austria	55	(1)
- * Club domestic league appearances and goals

Peter Artner (born 20 May 1966) is an Austrian former professional footballer who played as a defender.

== Club career ==
Born in Vienna, Artner started his professional career with Austria Wien where he was the supposed successor of club legend Robert Sara. After a season on loan to First Vienna, he was however deemed surplus to requirements at Austria so he signed for Admira Wacker where he would spend six years before enjoying considerable success at Austria Salzburg. He played in both legs of the 1994 UEFA Cup Final which they lost to Inter Milan.

After indifferent spells in Spain and the Italian Serie B he returned to Austria to finish his career with the Sankt Pölten side.

== International career ==
Artner made his debut for Austria in November 1987 against Romania and was a participant at the 1990 FIFA World Cup, where he was sent off in Austria's first round victory over the United States. He earned 55 caps, scoring one goal. His last international was a May 1996 friendly match against the Czech Republic.

== Career statistics ==
Scores and results list Austria's goal tally first, score column indicates score after each Artner goal.

List of international goals scored by Peter Artner
No.	Date	Venue	Opponent	Score	Result	Competition
1	11 April 1990	Stadion Lehen, Salzburg, Austria	Hungary	1–0	3–0	Friendly

== Honours ==
Wüstenrot Salzburg

- Austrian Football Bundesliga: 1994, 1995

Austria Wien

- Austrian Cup: 1986
