= Martin Amerhauser =

Austrian footballer (born 1974)

Personal information
- Date of birth: 23 July 1974 (age 52)
- Place of birth: Salzburg, Austria
- Height: 1.80 m (5 ft 11 in)
- Position: Midfielder

Senior career*
Years	Team	Apps	(Gls)
1993–1994	SV Salzburg	23	(3)
1995–1996	Grazer AK	42	(6)
1996–1999	SV Salzburg	94	(9)
1999–2010	Grazer AK	258	(13)
2010	Maria Lankowitz		
Total		417	(31)

International career
1998–2005	Austria	12	(3)
- * Club domestic league appearances and goals

Martin Amerhauser (born 23 July 1974) is an Austrian former professional footballer who played as a midfielder.

== Club career ==
Amerhauser was a left-sided midfielder known for his accurate crossing. He played vin the Austrian Bundesliga for SV Salzburg and Grazer AK. Considered a promising talent in the early 1990s, his career included winning major honors with both clubs.

In his first season, Amerhauser scored the decisive 3–0 in probably the best game Stadion Lehen has ever seen against Sporting CP in the UEFA Cup. Only 19 years of age, he went on to play in both legs of the Final which they lost to Inter Milan.

In 2007, he experienced a career low with the demotion of GAK to the Regionalliga Mitte because of financial difficulties.

== International career ==
Amerhauser made his debut for Austria in a March 1998 friendly match against Hungary in which he immediately scored his first international goal. He then was a participant at the 1998 FIFA World Cup but did not play. His last international was a September 2005 World Cup qualifying match against Azerbaijan.

== Honors ==
SV Austria Salzburg

- Austrian Bundesliga: 1993–94, 1996–97

Grazer AK

- Austrian Bundesliga: 2003–04
- Austrian Cup: 1999–2000, 2001–02, 2003–04
