= Marquinho (footballer, born 1966) =

Brazilian footballer

Personal information
- Full name: Marco Antônio Dos Santos
- Date of birth: 11 November 1966 (age 59)
- Place of birth: Porto Alegre, Brazil
- Height: 1.80 m (5 ft 11 in)
- Position: Midfielder

Senior career*
Years	Team	Apps	(Gls)
1985–1988	Ponte Preta		
1989	Internacional		
1990–1992	Sport Boys		
1993	Sporting Cristal		
1994	SV Salzburg		
1995	Alianza Lima		
1996	Puebla		
1997	Alianza Lima		
1998	Colorado Rapids		
1998	Çanakkale Dardanelspor		
1999	Sport Boys		
2000	Alianza Lima		
- * Club domestic league appearances and goals

Marco Antônio Dos Santos (born 11 November 1966), commonly known as Marquinho, is a Brazilian former professional footballer who played as a midfielder.

Born in Porto Alegre, Brazil, Marquinho started his career playing as an attacking midfielder with Ponte Preta in Brazil. He also played with Internacional Porto Alegre, Sport Boys (Peru), Sporting Cristal (Peru), Casino Salzburg (Austria), Alianza Lima (Peru), Puebla F.C. (Mexico) and Tampico Madero (Mexico) Colorado Rapids (USA), Çanakkale Dardanelspor (Turkey). In 1994, he led Casino Salzburg to the final of the UEFA Cup where they lost to Inter Milan. He also won La República's best foreign player of the year award when he played for Alianza Lima in 1991. Marquinho scored three goals in 11 appearances for Colorado Rapids before being released in June 1998.
