= Christian Fürstaller =

Austrian footballer

Personal information
- Date of birth: December 30, 1964 (age 61)
- Place of birth: Piesendorf, Austria
- Height: 1.74 m (5 ft 9 in)
- Position: Defender

Senior career*
Years	Team	Apps	(Gls)
1984–1995	SV Austria Salzburg		

International career
	Austria	5	(0)
- * Club domestic league appearances and goals

Christian Fürstaller (born December 30, 1964) is an Austrian former professional footballer who played as a defender. He made five appearances for the Austria national team.

== Honours ==
- Austrian Football Bundesliga: 1994, 1995
- UEFA Cup finalist: 1994
