= Franz Aigner (footballer) =

Austrian footballer and manager (born 1967)

Personal information
- Date of birth: 14 September 1967 (age 59)
- Place of birth: St Johann im Pongau, Austria
- Height: 1.78 m (5 ft 10 in)
- Position: Midfielder

Team information
- Current team: SV Wals-Grünau (manager)

Youth career
- SK Bischofshofen

Senior career*
Years	Team	Apps	(Gls)
1986–1988	Sturm Graz	23	(0)
1988–2000	SV Austria Salzburg	195	(9)
1991–1992	→ FC Kärnten (loan)	11	(1)
2000–2002	BSV Bad Bleiberg	48	(0)

International career
1994–1998	Austria	6	(1)

Managerial career
- 2003–2006: FC Red Bull Juniors Salzburg
- 2007–2009: TSV St. Johann
- 2010–2011: Union Gurten
- 2011: SV Grödig II
- 2012–2016: TSV St. Johann
- 2016–: SV Wals-Grünau
- * Club domestic league appearances and goals

Franz Aigner (born 14 September 1967) is an Austrian football manager and former player who manages SV Wals-Grünau.

== Career statistics ==
Scores and results list Austria's goal tally first.

No	Date	Venue	Opponent	Score	Result	Competition
1.	7 September 1994	Sportpark, Eschen, Liechtenstein	Liechtenstein	2–0	4–0	Euro 1996 qualifier

== Honours ==
- Austrian Football Bundesliga winner: 1994, 1995, 1997.
- Austrian Supercup winner: 1994, 1995, 1997.
- UEFA Cup finalist: 1994.
- Austrian Football Bundesliga runner-up: 1993.
- Austrian Cup finalist: 2000.
