= Thomas Winklhofer =

Austrian footballer

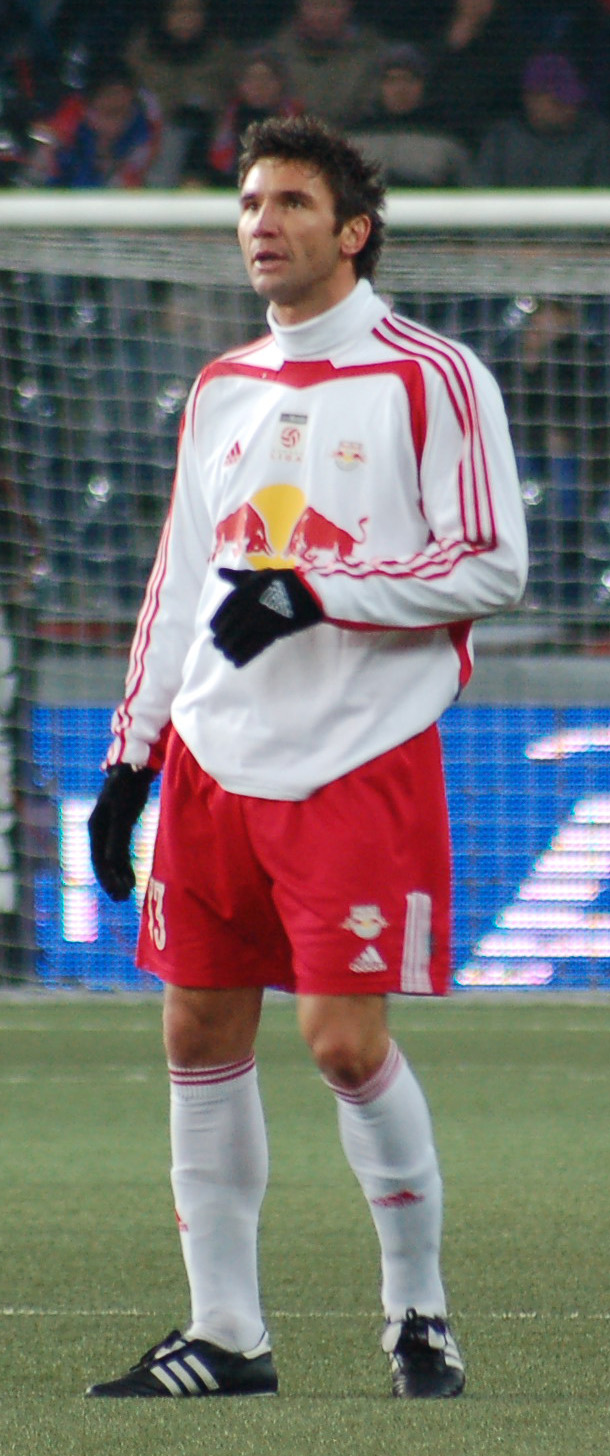
- Winklhofer in 2005

Personal information
- Date of birth: December 30, 1970 (age 55)
- Place of birth: Seekirchen, Austria
- Height: 1.84 m (6 ft 0 in)
- Position: Defender

Youth career
- WSG Wattens
- SV Seekirchen

Senior career*
Years	Team	Apps	(Gls)
?–1992	FC Swarovski Tirol		
1992–1999	SV Austria Salzburg	249	(9)
2000–2002	1. FC Saarbrücken	32	(0)
2002–2005	SV Austria Salzburg	86	(0)
2005–2007	Red Bull Salzburg	34	(0)
2009–2010	TSV Neumarkt	2	(0)
Total		403	(9)

International career
1993–2001	Austria	20	(0)
- * Club domestic league appearances and goals

Thomas Winklhofer (born December 30, 1970) is an Austrian former professional footballer who played as a defender. He made 20 appearances for the Austria national team.

== Honours ==
- Austrian Football Bundesliga: 1994, 1995, 1997, 2007
- Austrian Supercup: 1994, 1995, 1997
