= SV Austria Salzburg =

Austria Salzburg
- Full name: Sportverein Austria Salzburg
- Nicknames: Violette (Violet-Whites); Die Mozartstädter (The People of Mozart's City); Stadtverein (City Association); Austrianer (supporters)
- Founded: 2005; 21 years ago
- Ground: Max Aicher Stadion
- Capacity: 1,566
- Obmann/Chairman: Claus Salzmann
- Head coach: Christian Schaider
- League: 2. Liga
- 2025–26: 2. Liga, 9th of 16
- Website: austria-salzburg.at
Home colours	Away colours

SV Austria Salzburg is an Austrian professional football club based in the city of Salzburg. The club was formed in 2005 by some supporters of the original SV (Austria) Salzburg after it was renamed FC Red Bull Salzburg by its new owners, who also changed the club's colours from its traditional violet and white to red and white.

The club started participation in the seventh tier of Austria's national league system in 2006, then rose through four successive championships to the third tier, Regionalliga West, in 2010. In 2015, the club gained promotion to the Erste Liga, one tier below the Austrian Bundesliga, only to be relegated a year later. Austria currently competes in Austrian Second League in the 2025–26 season, after promotion from Austrian Regionalliga in 2024–25.

== History ==
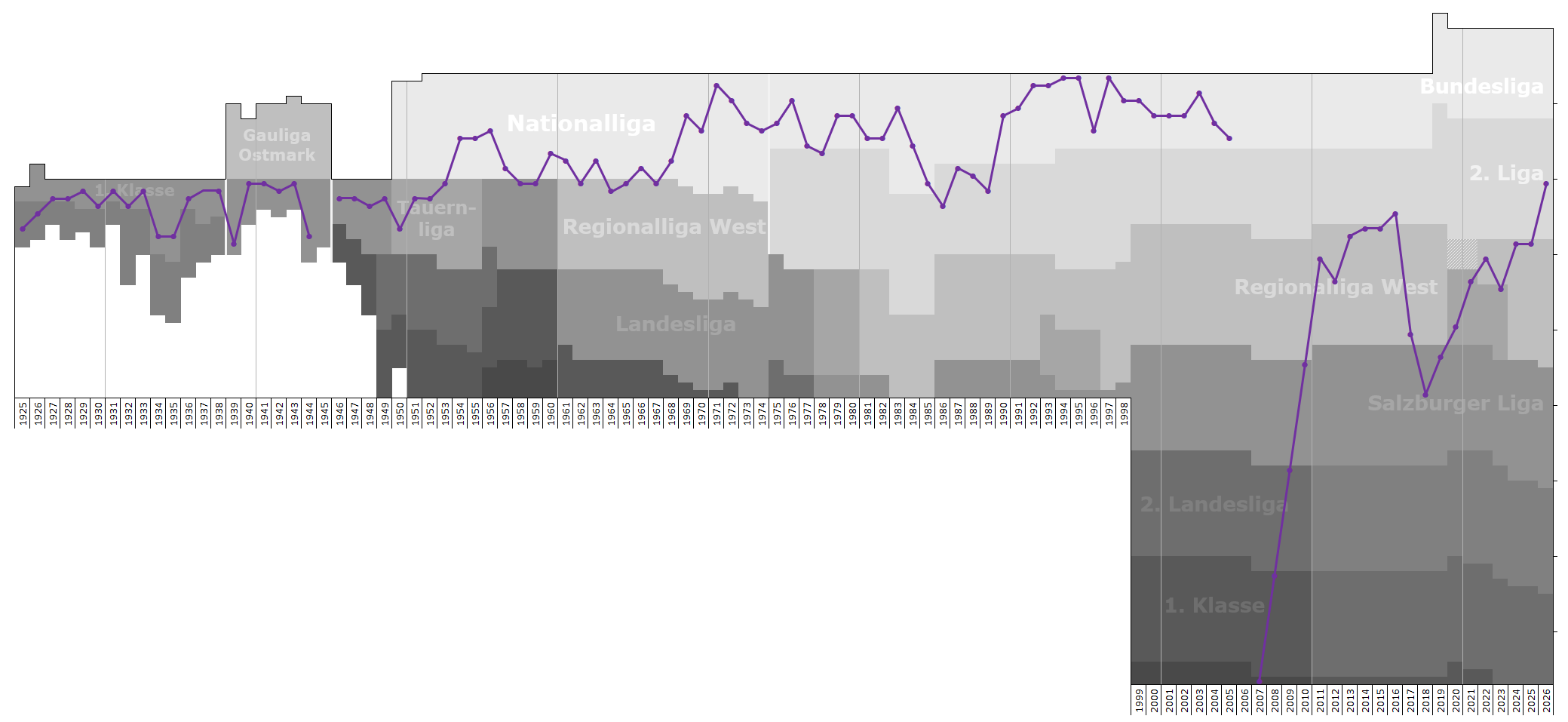
Historical chart of Austria Salzburg league performance

The history of the old SV Austria Salzburg until 2005 is now associated with FC Red Bull Salzburg, as Red Bull took over and transformed the club in 2005. It serves also the prehistory of the newly founded club. Until the 2005 reform, the club had won the Austrian Bundesliga 3 times and also reached the 1993-94 UEFA Cup final against Inter Milan, under coach Otto Baric.

On 13 June 2005, after weeks of protests and rejection, 1933-founded Austria Salzburg became Red Bull Salzburg, and their traditional purple colours became red and white (only the goalkeeper would wear violet socks).

The changing of colours and crest provoked most anger, alienating a large group of their support. Soon, a new club under the old name and colours was created.

The club was founded on 13 September 1933 and refounded on 7 October 2005, months after Red Bull acquired the original club. The original club was founded on as SV Austria Salzburg, after the merger of the city's two clubs, Hertha and Rapid. In 1950, the club was dissolved but re-founded later the same year. It reached the Austrian top flight in 1953, and finished 9th of 14 clubs in its first season there, avoiding relegation by five points.

Famous players who played for the club until 2005, include Oliver Bierhoff, Thomas Häßler, Heimo Pfeifenberger, Thomas Winklhofer, Maynor Suazo, Hans Krankl, Otto Konrad, and Toni Polster.

=== Name history of predecessor club ===
- 1933 to 1946: SV Austria Salzburg (merger of FC Rapid Salzburg and FC Hertha Salzburg)
- 1946 to 1950: TSV Austria Salzburg (merger with ATSV Salzburg)
- 1950 to 1973: SV Austria Salzburg (merger dissolved)
- 1973 to 1976: SV Gerngroß A. Salzburg (Gerngroß Department Store sponsorship)
- 1976 to 1978: SV Sparkasse Austria Salzburg (Erste Group savings bank sponsorship)
- 1978 to 1997: SV Casino Salzburg (Casinos Austria sponsorship)
- 1997 to 2005: SV Wüstenrot Salzburg (Wüstenrot-Gruppe sponsorship)
- 2005 to present: SV Austria Salzburg (no sponsorship)

The club's name and crest had changed several times until 2005 as a result of mergers, sponsorships, and acquisitions. The name "Austria" had not been part of the club's name since 1978, but until 2005 it had been colloquially referred to as Austria Salzburg by fans and media. This is why the club was refounded as Austria in 2005.

=== The color dispute and the Violet-White initiative ===
When Red Bull GmbH's plans to acquire Austria Salzburg became known in April 2005, the club's supporters were positive about the plan due to the club's poor financial situation. In Austria, renaming a sports club is comparatively normal; many teams in football or ice hockey bear the name of a sponsor, usually to reorganize their finances or increase their budget. Usually, however, such changes are made with respect for the club's tradition, which is only gently altered. In this case, it was a radical reorganization of the club, which in effect amounted to a takeover of the club – Red Bull had the sole right to appoint the club's board of directors written into the club's statutes – that led to the founding of the initiative and a power struggle between Austria's fan scene and the new de facto owner.

Points of contention were the lack of acceptance of the club's history (the new management originally stated 2005 as the year of the club's foundation, which was only reversed under pressure from the ÖFB) and, above all, the traditional colours of violet-white, which remained the official club colours on paper, but in fact no longer existed. Red and white replaced the traditional colours of violet and white – not only as the colour of the jerseys – and the Red Bull logo became an essential part of the club crest.

As a reaction to the transformation of the club by the new owner, supporters founded the Violet-White initiative, whose initial aim was to preserve the club's violet and white tradition. They acted on several levels: On the one hand, negotiations were held with club officials, on the other hand, actions such as the peaceful invasion and occupation of the pitch during a friendly match were carried out.

The talks finally broke down when Red Bull only offered a purple captain's bow, a small purple logo of the new outfitter Adidas on the jerseys and purple socks for the goalkeeper as the only compromise, which was viewed as an insult by the club's traditionalists. In the course of the first half of the 2005/06 season, Austria's fan camp split into traditional violet supporters and new Red Bull supporters. Protest banners, chants, continued violet choreographies and the violet jerseys and scarves still worn by the supporters were also an expression of the rejection of Red Bull and Dietrich Mateschitz.

During the talks, but increasingly after their failure, there were various incidents between the tradition-conscious supporters and the Red Bull Salzburg management. Further agitation was caused by the conversion of the fan sector from a standing to a seated sector and bans against alleged hooligans from supporters, which were, however, partially rescinded.

=== Supporters' solidarity and media coverage ===
Throughout Austria and in many European stadiums there were solidarity rallies of fan groups with the violet supporters. Their protest is generally understood as a fight by football supporters against the progressive commercialisation of the sport and is supported accordingly. Contrary to the usual rivalries between supporters of different clubs, the developments in Salzburg have led to football supporters seeing themselves as a unit and acting together "against modern football". The aim is to preserve the tradition and identity of the respective club and to prevent the clubs from becoming mere advertising vehicles. The supporters themselves see themselves as these bearers of tradition as the players, coaches and board change. Especially in the Ultrà movement, the vehemence with which Salzburg supporters resisted the new identity of their club was welcomed and supported.

Overall, supporters of all Austrian first division clubs have shown solidarity with the Violet-White initiative with banners and choreographies, as have the supporters of most second division clubs. In Germany, the supporters of many Bundesliga clubs have also expressed their solidarity, as have some of the supporters in the lower leagues. In total, 23 football fan clubs from Austria, 53 from the rest of Europe and even two from the USA have declared their solidarity with the initiative. Such unity and support among supporters is new in Austrian and European football history. Prominent footballers and coaches such as Hans Krankl, Paul Scharner, Toni Pfeffer, Ernst Dospel and Herbert Prohaska also support the initiative of the violet supporters.

In the run-up to the 2006 World Cup, various television stations such as ZDF and Arte also increasingly documented the activities of the Violet-White initiative and the founding of the new association to provide information on how football supporters deal with the commercialisation of their sport.

=== Foundation of a new Austria ===
After the failure of the negotiations with the new club managers, the majority of the violet supporters withdrew from the stadium. The aim was to found a new Austria Salzburg. The first step in this direction was the founding of the club by entering it in the register of clubs under the name Sportverein Austria Salzburg on 7 October 2005.

The founding of the club as the last step of the protest has its antecedents in England. Already in similar cases in London, where AFC Wimbledon was founded as a reaction to the move of Wimbledon FC, and Manchester (after the purchase of Manchester United by Malcolm Glazer, the protests culminated in the new club FC United of Manchester), the new clubs were able to retain their supporters over a longer period of time.

The new club quickly had around 800 members and a large following. To be able to start playing as soon as possible, negotiations were held with the football section of PSV/Schwarz-Weiß Salzburg, which finally led to a cooperation for spring 2006. The team played in violet and white jerseys bearing the coats of arms of both clubs. At the end of the season, however, the cooperation was terminated again, as no guarantees were given by PSV for a future outsourcing of the football section.

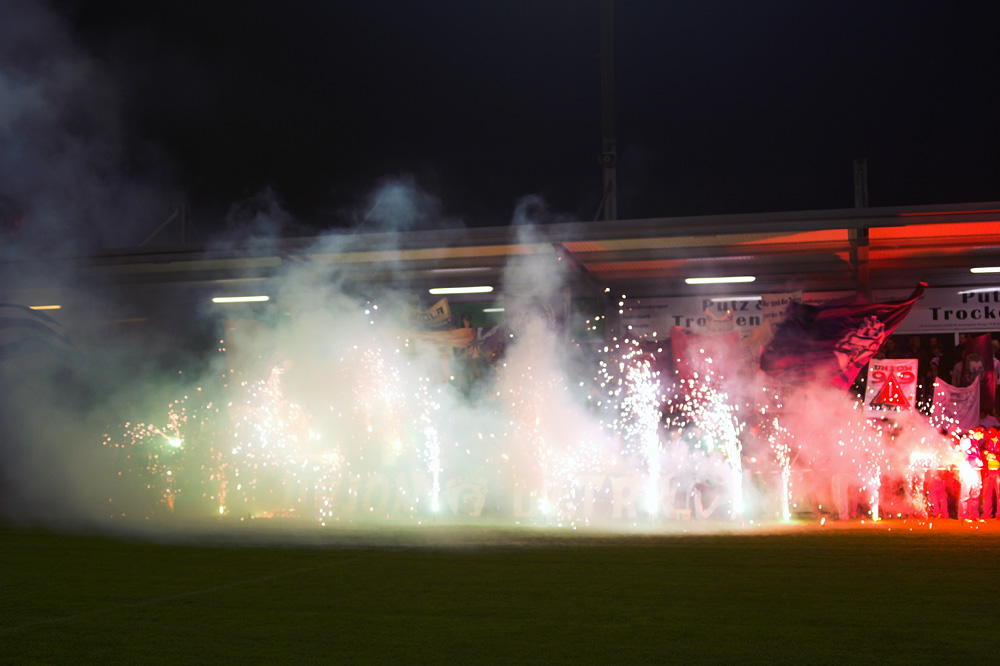
Seekirchen 1b against SV Austria in 2006

=== The lowest division and the way to the top ===
In the 2006/07 season, Austria started as an independent club with a completely new squad (including some footballers from their own supporters' section) in the lowest division, the Salzburg 2nd Class North A, despite the fact that they had managed to stay in the Landesliga. The venue was the UFC Salzburg-Danubia ground in Nonntal.

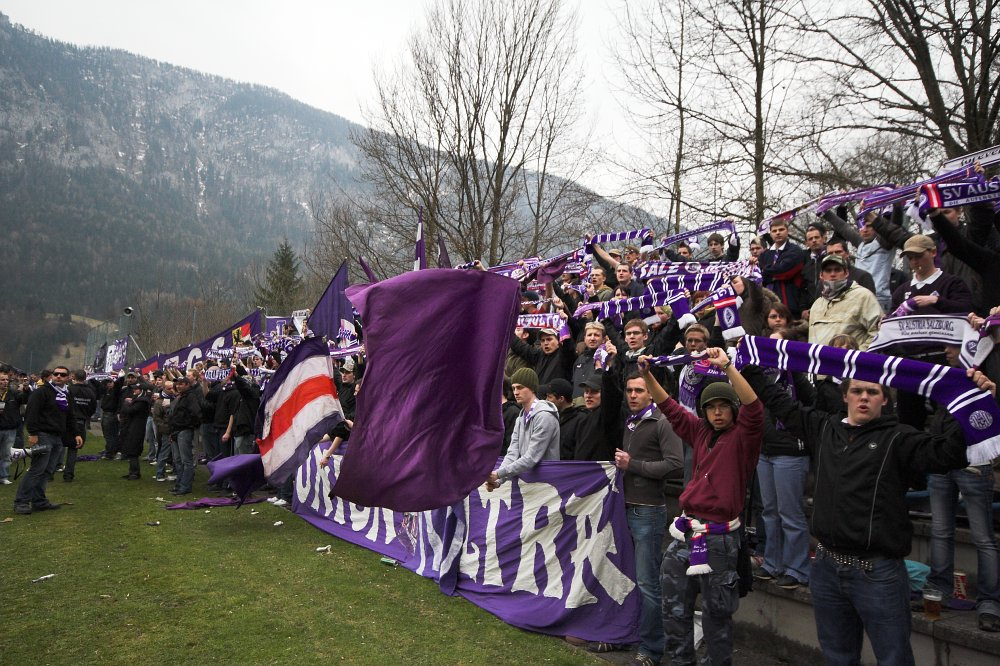
TSV Unken against SV Austria in 2007.

At the beginning of the 2007/08 season, the search for a new long-term venue came to an end. SV Austria Salzburg now plays its matches at the Max Aicher Stadion in the district Maxglan of Salzburg. The club also secured the championship title in the three following seasons, which enabled them to march through to the Regionalliga West, Austria's third-highest division. With this success, Austria also became the first club from the province of Salzburg to achieve four promotions in a row.

That meant that the club would play in Austria's fourth tier, the Austrian Landesliga, for the first time in the 2009–10 season.

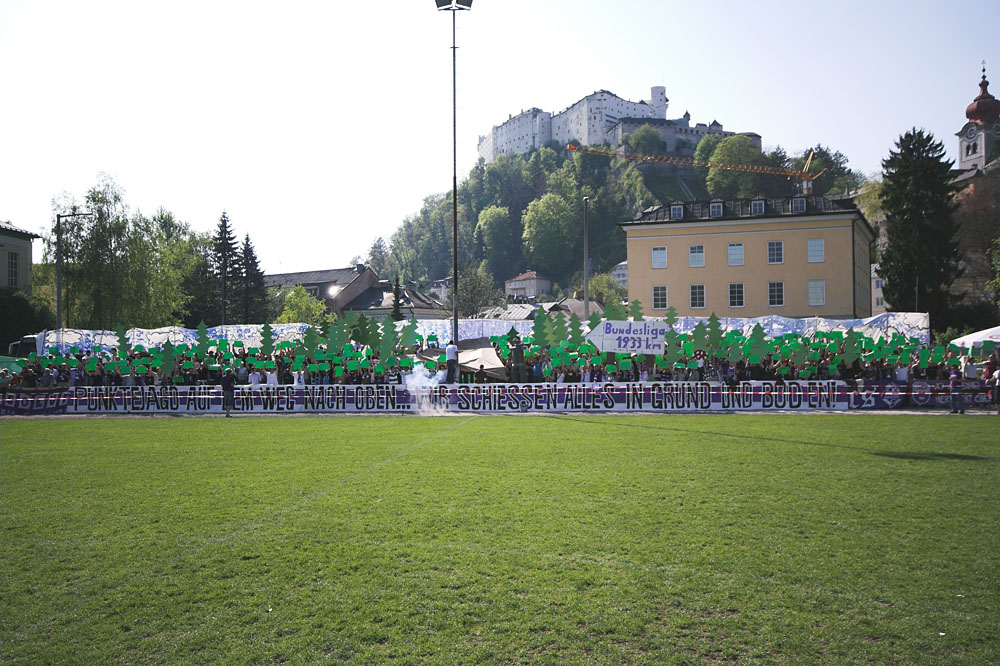
Home match against Schleedorf in 2007.

=== Promotion to professional football and bankruptcy ===
In the 2015/16 season, Austria played in the second-tier Erste Liga and thus in professional football for the first time since its foundation. At the end of November 2015, the club announced that it had initiated reorganisation proceedings without self-administration.

Shortly afterwards, coach Jørn Andersen resigned due to a lack of sporting prospects. He was succeeded by Gerald Baumgartner, who also took over the position of sporting director. Shortly afterwards, co-coach Thomas Klochan and goalkeeping coach Alex Schriebl also left the club. On 1 March 2016, the vast majority of creditors approved the reorganisation plan. As a result, the club, which was in debt to the tune of €1.4 million, was able to finish the 2015/16 season. While ninth place would have been enough to keep the club in the sporting relegation zone despite the deduction of 6 points, the club was automatically relegated to the Regionalliga West due to the insolvency.

The following season 2016/17 in the Regionalliga West ended with relegation to the Salzburger Liga (4th tier). Another financial collapse could only be avoided through donations from members. In the second year, the club was promoted back to the Regionalliga, where Austria has competed ever since.

=== 2023–present ===
This season 2023/24 was the club's 90th anniversary, reflecting once again that the it embraces the history and tradition of the original Austria Salzburg. In addition, to the anniversary, it was officially announced that the club is now debt-free and therefore has no outstanding liabilities.

Furthermore, SV Austria Salzburg met FC Red Bull Salzburg for the first time, 18 years after the takeover and the resulting refounding, in the 2nd round of the Austrian Cup. Due to the classification as a high-risk game, the match could not be played in the home ground and had to be played in the stadium Untersbergarena in Grödig, which is about 10 km away from Salzburg. The match took place in front of more than 4,000 spectators and attracted football fans from all over Europe. The first division team won 4–0.

SV Austria Salzburg won promotion to the 2nd league after topping its group in 2023/24 season. However, promotion was rejected due to lack of infrastructure: a building project close to the stadium made it necessary to erect noise protection walls. Funding and commitment came too late for the licensing procedure. Thus, the club again competed in Regionalliga West for the 2024–25 season.

On 7 June 2025, Austria Salzburg secured promotion to Austrian Second League for the next season after defeating SC Schwaz with 1–0 narrow win by a dramatic goal scored by Marinko Sorda in 88th minute.

== Honours ==
Club honours for SV Austria Salzburg since 2005.

- Regionalliga West
  - Champions: 2014, 2015, 2024, 2025
- Landescup
  - Champions: 2012, 2013, 2014
- Austrian Landesliga
  - Champions: 2010
- Austrian 2. Landesliga
  - Champions: 2009
- 1. Klasse Nord
  - Champions: 2008
- 2. Klasse Nord A
  - Champions: 2007

Honours before 2005 (awarded to Red Bull Salzburg)

- Austrian Bundesliga: 1993–94*, 1994–95*, 1996–97*
- 2. Liga (Austria): 1977–78*, 1986–87*
- Austrian Supercup: 1994*, 1995*, 1997*
- UEFA Cup
  - Runners-up: 1993–94

== League history ==
Season	League Contested	Level	Pld	W	D	L	GF	GA	GD	Pts	League Position	Notes	Average Attendance
2006–07	2. Klasse Nord A	7	26	24	1	1	109	8	+101	73	1st of 14	Promoted	
2007–08	1. Klasse Nord	6	26	25	0	1	94	10	+84	75	1st of 14	Promoted	
2008–09	2. Landesliga Nord	5	26	21	4	1	90	28	+62	67	1st of 14	Promoted	
2009–10	1. Landesliga	4	26	19	3	4	68	24	+44	60	1st of 14	Promoted	1,750
2010–11	Regionalliga West	3	30	15	9	6	61	37	+24	54	5th of 16		1,290
2011–12	Regionalliga West	3	30	12	4	14	54	54	0	40	8th of 16		1,194
2012–13	Regionalliga West	3	30	21	5	4	77	21	+56	68	2nd of 16		1,291
2013–14	Regionalliga West	3	30	25	4	1	96	15	+81	79	1st of 16	Defeated in playoffs	1,298
2014–15	Regionalliga West	3	30	23	4	3	71	23	+48	73	1st of 16	Promoted	1,332
2015–16	Erste Liga	2	36	7	11	18	45	73	−28	26	9th of 10	Relegated	1,476
2016–17	Regionalliga West	3	30	4	11	15	43	62	−19	23	15th of 16	Relegated	918
2017–18	Salzburger Liga	4	30	11	8	11	57	50	7	41	7th of 16		
2018–19	Salzburger Liga	4	30	21	7	2	92	31	61	70	2nd of 16	Promoted	952
2019–20	Regionalliga Salzburg	3	18	5	3	10	27	31	−4	18	8th of 10	COVID-shortened seasons	1,051
2020–21	Regionalliga Salzburg	3	14	9	1	4	21	15	+6	28	2nd of 10	COVID-shortened seasons	786
2021–22	Regionalliga Salzburg	3	18	12	2	4	40	17	+23	38	2nd of 10	COVID-shortened seasons	1,070
2022–23	Regionalliga Salzburg	3	30	19	7	4	68	35	+33	64	3rd of 12		983
2023–24	Regionalliga West	3	30	20	6	4	93	34	+59	66	1st of 16	Ineligible for promotion	1,318
2024–25	Regionalliga West	3	30	23	3	4	71	24	+47	72	1st of 16	Promoted	1,329
2025–26	Second League	2	30	9	10	9	36	37	–1	37	9th of 16		

== Current squad ==
As of 23 September 2026

Note: Flags indicate national team as defined under FIFA eligibility rules; some limited exceptions apply. Players may hold more than one non-FIFA nationality.

No.	Pos.	Nation	Player
1	GK	AUT	Simon Nesler-Täubl (on loan from Austria Lustenau)
2	DF	AUT	Tobias Rohrmoser
3	DF	GER	San-Luca Spitali
4	MF	BIH	Denis Kahrimanović
5	DF	AUT	Lukas Schweighofer (on loan from WSG Tirol)
6	MF	AUT	Thomas Schandl
7	FW	GER	Mohammad Mahmoud
8	MF	AUT	Marco Rottensteiner
9	FW	AUT	Nico Lukasser-Weitlaner
10	MF	AUT	Florian Rieder
11	MF	AUT	Christian Huetz (on loan from WSG Tirol)
12	DF	AUT	Luka Sandmayr
13	GK	AUT	Philipp Bauer

No.	Pos.	Nation	Player
14	DF	AUT	Christoph Gruber
17	MF	TUR	Arda Bahadır
19	DF	AUT	Raphael Hofer
20	DF	AUT	Moritz Eder
22	DF	AUT	Tobias Pfeffer
30	MF	GER	Luca Schmitzberger
33	GK	AUT	Manuel Kalman
55	DF	AUT	Luca Meisl (captain)
60	DF	AUT	Simon Pirkl
70	FW	AUT	Tamar Crnkic
71	FW	AUT	Christian Gebauer
77	MF	CRO	Dario Bijelić

== Notable players ==
- (Austria) Karim Onisiwo
- (Austria) Fabio Strauss
- (Austria) Michael Perlak
- (Austria) Ernst Öbster
- (Austria) Haris Bukva
- (Austria) Manuel Krainz
- (Austria) Marco Hödl
- (Austria) Fabian Windhager
- (Cameroon) Somen Tchoyi
- (Bosnia and Herzegovina) Hidajet Hankić

== Stadium ==
Austria played in the UFC-Platz stadium in the beginning. Later the club moved to Wald Austria Stadion of 1,700 capacity.

It currently plays in the Max Aicher Stadion of 1,566 capacity.

The club since 1933 has used the stadiums below:

- Stadion Lehen: 1952–2002
- Wals Siezenheim Stadium: 2002–2005 After 2005:
- UFC-Platz stadium
- Wald Austria Stadion
- Stadium Sportzentrum
- Max Aicher Stadion

== Club crest ==
Logos of the original club and the breakaway after 2005 below.

Crest before and after 2005
SV Casino Salzburg (1978–1997)

SV Austria Salzburg (2005–present)

== Supporters ==
The club has hard-core fans from the pre-2005 era. The nationwide Austrian union of SV Austria Salzburg supporters is the violet and white campaign (Initiative violett-weiß).

In the 2014–15 season the club averaged 1,300 tickets per game, the second best IN third tier Regionalliga (behind First Vienna) and the 17th in all Austrian football leagues.

== Rivalries ==
Since the club's rebranding, there has been animosity towards Red Bull Salzburg. The original supporters of the club consider Red Bull Salzburg as a franchise. It is a similar feeling and situation between AFC Wimbledon and MK Dons.

On 27 September 2023, SV Austria Salzburg took on Red Bull Salzburg in the Austrian Cup. It was the first time the two clubs met. However, many SV Austria Salzburg fans refused to even call it a derby.

The match took place at Stadium Sportzentrum in front of 4,000 spectators, but Austria lost 0–4 to the guests.

== Coaching history ==
- 01/01/2018–present: (Germany) Christian Schaider
- 01/07/2017 – 30 June 2018: (Austria) Markus Schneidhofer
- 12/04/2017 – 30 June 2017: (Turkey) Attila Piskin
- 01/07/2016 – 8 April 2017: (Austria) Dietmar Emich
- 18 December 2015 – 30 June 2016: (Austria) Gerald Baumgartner
- 02/01/2015 – 1 December 2015: (Norway) Jørn Andersen
- 01/07/2014 – 24 November 2014: (Austria) Klaus Schmidt
- 01/07/2013 – 30 June 2014: (Serbia) Miroslav Polak
- 01/12/2011 – 30 June 2013: (Austria) Thomas Hofer
- 19 September 2011 – 31 December 2011: (Austria) Gerhard Stöger
- 1 January 2009 – 19 September 2011: (Austria) Dietmar Emich
- 01/07/2008 – 13 December 2008: (North Macedonia) Miroslav Bojčeski
- 01/07/2006 – 1 February 2008: (Austria) Gustav Kofler

== See also ==
- List of fan-owned sports teams
- Phoenix club

== Sources ==
- Salzburg derby, 18 years on the making BBC
