= 1993–94 Austrian Football Bundesliga =

76th season of top-tier football league in Austria

Austrian Bundesliga
- Season: 1993–94
- Champions: SV Austria Salzburg

Statistics of Austrian Football Bundesliga in the 1993–94 season.

== Overview ==
It was contested by 10 teams, and SV Austria Salzburg won the championship.

=== Teams and location ===
Location of teams in the 1993–94 Austrian Football Bundesliga

Teams of 1993–94 Austrian Football Bundesliga

- FC Admira/Wacker
- Austria Salzburg
- Austria Wien
- VfB Mödling
- Rapid Wien
- Sankt Pölten
- Sturm Graz
- Tirol Innsbruck
- Vorwärts Steyr
- Wiener Sport-Club

== League standings ==
Pos	Team	Pld	W	D	L	GF	GA	GD	Pts	Qualification or relegation
1	Austria Salzburg (C)	36	21	9	6	56	18	+38	51	Qualification to Champions League qualifying round
2	Austria Wien	36	22	5	9	63	39	+24	49	Qualification to Cup Winners' Cup first round
3	Admira/Wacker	36	18	8	10	51	35	+16	44	Qualification to UEFA Cup first round
4	Tirol Innsbruck	36	14	11	11	48	33	+15	39	Qualification to UEFA Cup first round
5	Rapid Wien	36	12	11	13	38	42	−4	35	
6	VfB Mödling	36	12	11	13	32	49	−17	35	
7	Sturm Graz	36	12	9	15	37	42	−5	33	
8	Vorwärts Steyr	36	8	10	18	43	54	−11	26	
9	VSE St. Pölten (R)	36	9	8	19	37	57	−20	26	Qualification for relegation play-offs
10	Wiener SC (R)	36	5	12	19	21	57	−36	22	Relegation to Austrian First Football League

Source: bundesliga.at (in German)
(C) Champions; (R) Relegated

== Results ==
Teams played each other four times in the league. In the first half of the season each team played every other team twice (home and away), and then did the same in the second half of the season.

=== First half of season ===
Home \ Away	ADM	ASZ	AWI	RWI	STU	TIR	MÖD	VOR	StP	WIE
Admira/Wacker		1–0	0–3	2–0	2–2	0–0	2–0	2–0	4–3	3–0
Austria Salzburg	0–0		2–0	1–0	2–0	1–0	1–2	2–0	2–0	3–1
Austria Wien	2–0	1–2		2–1	3–0	2–1	1–0	4–1	3–0	3–1
Rapid Wien	1–2	0–3	0–3		2–1	2–0	0–0	1–1	4–0	3–1
Sturm Graz	1–2	0–2	2–4	1–0		1–0	1–0	1–1	1–0	3–1
Tirol Innsbruck	2–1	2–0	3–1	1–1	4–2		4–2	3–0	2–1	2–0
VfB Mödling	1–1	1–1	0–2	1–1	1–0	1–1		2–1	1–0	1–0
Vorwärts Steyr	4–1	0–2	2–0	3–0	0–1	1–1	1–1		2–0	6–0
VSE St. Pölten	0–1	1–0	3–2	1–1	2–1	0–0	1–0	3–1		0–1
Wiener SC	0–2	0–0	0–1	0–1	0–0	1–1	1–1	2–1	1–1	

Source: weltfussball.de (in German)
Legend: Blue = home team win; Yellow = draw; Red = away team win.

=== Second half of season ===
Home \ Away	ADM	ASZ	AWI	RWI	STU	TIR	MÖD	VOR	StP	WIE
Admira/Wacker		0–3	4–2	0–0	1–1	2–0	0–1	4–0	3–1	2–0
Austria Salzburg	2–0		6–0	2–1	0–0	0–0	0–0	3–1	4–1	0–1
Austria Wien	3–1	0–4		2–0	0–0	1–0	3–0	1–0	0–1	1–1
Rapid Wien	0–3	0–0	1–1		2–4	2–0	0–2	3–0	5–3	0–0
Sturm Graz	1–0	0–1	0–0	1–2		0–0	2–1	3–1	2–0	3–1
Tirol Innsbruck	0–1	1–1	0–1	0–1	2–1		4–0	4–2	2–1	6–0
VfB Mödling	0–3	3–2	0–4	0–0	2–0	0–0		0–5	4–1	0–0
Vorwärts Steyr	0–0	1–3	1–1	0–1	0–0	2–0	1–2		1–1	1–1
VSE St. Pölten	1–0	0–0	2–3	1–1	2–1	0–0	5–0	0–1		0–0
Wiener SC	1–1	0–1	0–3	0–1	1–0	1–2	0–2	1–1	3–1	

Source: weltfussball.de (in German)
Legend: Blue = home team win; Yellow = draw; Red = away team win.

== Relegation play-offs ==
Team 1	Agg.	Team 2	1st leg	2nd leg
VSE St. Pölten	3–5	FC Linz	1–2	2–3

== Top goalscorers ==
Rank	Scorer	Club	Goals
1	(Croatia) Nikola Jurčević	Austria Salzburg	14
1	(Austria) Heimo Pfeifenberger	Austria Salzburg	14
3	(Czech Republic) Václav Danek	Tirol Innsbruck	12
4	(Austria) Ralph Hasenhüttl	Austria Wien	11
5	(Austria) Christoph Westerthaler	Tirol Innsbruck	9
5	(Poland) Andrzej Kubica	Rapid Wien	9
7	(Austria) Tomica Kocijan	Vorwärts Steyr	8
7	(Austria) Thomas Janeschitz	Tirol Innsbruck	8
7	(Austria) Peter Stöger	Austria Wien	8
7	(Poland) Maciej Sliwowski	Rapid Wien	8
7	(Austria) Dieter Ramusch	VSE St. Pölten	8
