= UEFA Euro 1996 qualifying =

Tournament details
- Dates: 20 April 1994 – 13 December 1995
- Teams: 47

Tournament statistics
- Matches played: 231
- Goals scored: 680 (2.94 per match)
- Top scorer: (Croatia) Davor Šuker (12 goals)

Qualifying for UEFA Euro 1996 took place throughout 1994 and 1995. Forty-seven teams were divided into eight groups, with each team playing the others in their group both home and away. The winners of each group and the six best runners-up qualified automatically, while the two worst runners-up were involved in a play-off at a neutral venue. England qualified automatically as hosts of the event.

This was the first European Championship qualifying phase in which three points were awarded for each win, as opposed to the two points that had been awarded previously.

== Qualified teams ==
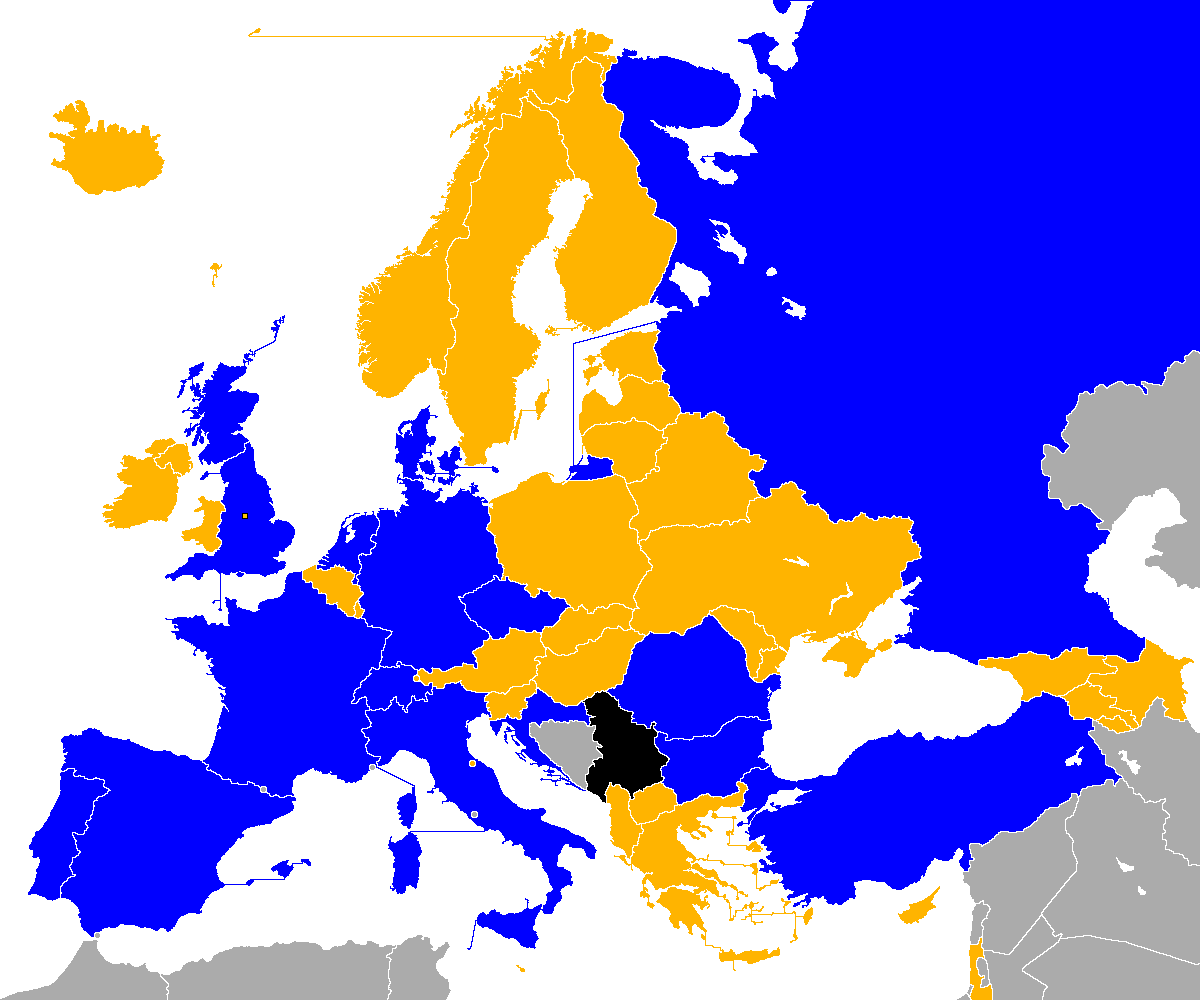
Qualified Did not qualify Did not enter Not a UEFA member

Team	Qualified as	Qualified on	Previous appearances in tournament (Note: Bold indicates champion for that year. Italic indicates host for that year.)
England	Host	5 May 1992	4 (1968, 1980, 1988, 1992)
Spain	Group 2 winner	11 October 1995	4 (**1964**, 1980, 1984, 1988)
Russia (Note: From 1960 to 1988, Russia competed as the Soviet Union, and in 1992 as CIS.)	Group 8 winner	11 October 1995	6 (**1960**, 1964, 1968, 1972, 1988, 1992)
Switzerland	Group 3 winner	15 November 1995	0 (debut)
Croatia	Group 4 winner	15 November 1995	0 (debut)
Scotland	4th best runner-up	15 November 1995	1 (1992)
Bulgaria	2nd best runner-up	15 November 1995	0 (debut)
Germany (Note: From 1972 to 1988, Germany competed as West Germany.)	Group 7 winner	15 November 1995	6 (**1972**, 1976, **1980**, 1984, 1988, 1992)
Romania	Group 1 winner	15 November 1995	1 (1984)
Turkey	3rd best runner-up	15 November 1995	0 (debut)
Denmark	5th best runner-up	15 November 1995	4 (1964, 1984, 1988, **1992**)
Czech Republic (Note: From 1960 to 1980, the Czech Republic competed as Czechoslovakia.)	Group 5 winner	15 November 1995	3 (1960, **1976**, 1980)
Italy	Best runner-up	15 November 1995	3 (**1968**, 1980, 1988)
France	6th best runner-up	15 November 1995	3 (1960, **1984**, 1992)
Portugal	Group 6 winner	15 November 1995	1 (1984)
Netherlands	Play-off winner	13 December 1995	4 (1976, 1980, **1988**, 1992)

== Seedings ==
The draw was made on 22 January 1994 in Manchester. Denmark were seeded first as title holders, while the remaining 46 teams were divided into six pots. Yugoslavia did not enter qualifying as they were suspended due to United Nations Security Council Resolution 757.

Pool 1 Denmark (title holders) France Russia Netherlands Germany Sweden Italy Republic of Ireland	Pool 2 Norway Romania Switzerland Portugal Greece Spain Wales Ukraine	Pool 3 Bulgaria Belgium Scotland Northern Ireland Poland Hungary Czech Republic Croatia
Pool 4 Iceland Austria Finland Lithuania Israel Macedonia Belarus Georgia	Pool 5 Turkey Latvia Albania Cyprus Malta Faroe Islands Estonia Slovakia	Pool 6 Luxembourg San Marino Liechtenstein Slovenia Moldova Armenia Azerbaijan

New entrants

New teams that joined UEFA's qualification games after the 1994 FIFA World Cup qualification (UEFA):

- From the former Soviet Union: Armenia, Azerbaijan, Belarus, Georgia, Moldova and Ukraine
- From the former Czechoslovakia: Czech Republic and Slovakia
- From the former Yugoslavia: Croatia, Macedonia and Slovenia
- Liechtenstein

This was also the first UEFA Euro qualifying appearance for Estonia, Israel, Latvia and Lithuania.

Initially Czech Republic were in Pool 2 and Wales in Pool 3. Slovakia were initially in Pool 4, before being replaced by Macedonia and put into Pool 5 in place of Luxembourg who were moved down to Pool 6.

== Summary ==
Group winners and the six best ranked runners-up qualified directly for UEFA Euro 1996
The two worst runners-up advanced to the play-off
Other teams were eliminated after the qualifying group stage

Group 1	Group 2	Group 3	Group 4	Group 5	Group 6	Group 7	Group 8
Romania	Spain	Switzerland	Croatia	Czech Republic	Portugal	Germany	Russia
France	Denmark	Turkey	Italy	Netherlands	Republic of Ireland	Bulgaria	Scotland
Slovakia Poland Israel Azerbaijan	Belgium Macedonia Cyprus Armenia	Sweden Hungary Iceland	Lithuania Ukraine Slovenia Estonia	Norway Belarus Luxembourg Malta	Northern Ireland Austria Latvia Liechtenstein	Georgia Moldova Wales Albania	Greece Finland Faroe Islands San Marino

== Tiebreakers ==
If two or more teams finished level on points after completion of the group matches, the following tiebreakers were used to determine the final ranking:

1. Higher number of points obtained in the matches played among the teams in question;
2. Superior goal difference in matches played among the teams in question;
3. Higher number of goals scored away from home in the matches played among the teams in question;
4. Superior goal difference in all group matches;
5. Higher number of goals scored in all group matches;
6. Higher number of away goals scored in all group matches;
7. Fair play conduct in all group matches (1 point for a single yellow card, 3 points for a red card as a consequence of two yellow cards, 3 points for a direct red card, 4 points for a yellow card followed by a direct red card).

== Groups ==
=== Group 1 ===
Pos	Team	Pld	W	D	L	GF	GA	GD	Pts	Qualification	(Romania)	(France)	(Slovakia)	(Poland)	(Israel)	(Azerbaijan)
1	Romania	10	6	3	1	18	9	+9	21	Qualify for final tournament	—	1–3	3–2	2–1	2–1	3–0
2	France	10	5	5	0	22	2	+20	20	Qualify for final tournament	0–0	—	4–0	1–1	2–0	10–0
3	Slovakia	10	4	2	4	14	18	−4	14		0–2	0–0	—	4–1	1–0	4–1
4	Poland	10	3	4	3	14	12	+2	13		0–0	0–0	5–0	—	4–3	1–0
5	Israel	10	3	3	4	13	13	0	12		1–1	0–0	2–2	2–1	—	2–0
6	Azerbaijan	10	0	1	9	2	29	−27	1		1–4	0–2	0–1	0–0	0–2	—

Source: UEFA

=== Group 2 ===
Pos	Team	Pld	W	D	L	GF	GA	GD	Pts	Qualification	(Spain)	(Denmark)	(Belgium)	(North Macedonia)	(Cyprus)	(Armenia)
1	Spain	10	8	2	0	25	4	+21	26	Qualify for final tournament	—	3–0	1–1	3–0	6–0	1–0
2	Denmark	10	6	3	1	19	9	+10	21	Qualify for final tournament	1–1	—	3–1	1–0	4–0	3–1
3	Belgium	10	4	3	3	17	13	+4	15		1–4	1–3	—	1–1	2–0	2–0
4	Macedonia	10	1	4	5	9	18	−9	7 (Note: Head-to-head points: Macedonia 4, Cyprus 1.)		0–2	1–1	0–5	—	3–0	1–2
5	Cyprus	10	1	4	5	6	20	−14	7		1–2	1–1	1–1	1–1	—	2–0
6	Armenia	10	1	2	7	5	17	−12	5		0–2	0–2	0–2	2–2	0–0	—

Source: UEFA

=== Group 3 ===
Pos	Team	Pld	W	D	L	GF	GA	GD	Pts	Qualification	(Switzerland)	(Turkey)	(Sweden)	(Hungary)	(Iceland)
1	Switzerland	8	5	2	1	15	7	+8	17	Qualify for final tournament	—	1–2	4–2	3–0	1–0
2	Turkey	8	4	3	1	16	8	+8	15	Qualify for final tournament	1–2	—	2–1	2–0	5–0
3	Sweden	8	2	3	3	9	10	−1	9		0–0	2–2	—	2–0	1–1
4	Hungary	8	2	2	4	7	13	−6	8		2–2	2–2	1–0	—	1–0
5	Iceland	8	1	2	5	3	12	−9	5		0–2	0–0	0–1	2–1	—

Source: UEFA

=== Group 4 ===
Pos	Team	Pld	W	D	L	GF	GA	GD	Pts	Qualification	(Croatia)	(Italy)	(Lithuania)	(Ukraine)	(Slovenia)	(Estonia)
1	Croatia	10	7	2	1	22	5	+17	23 (Note: Head-to-head points: Croatia 4, Italy 1.)	Qualify for final tournament	—	1–1	2–0	4–0	2–0	7–1
2	Italy	10	7	2	1	20	6	+14	23	Qualify for final tournament	1–2	—	4–0	3–1	1–0	4–1
3	Lithuania	10	5	1	4	13	12	+1	16		0–0	0–1	—	1–3	2–1	5–0
4	Ukraine	10	4	1	5	11	15	−4	13		1–0	0–2	0–2	—	0–0	3–0
5	Slovenia	10	3	2	5	13	13	0	11		1–2	1–1	1–2	3–2	—	3–0
6	Estonia	10	0	0	10	3	31	−28	0		0–2	0–2	0–1	0–1	1–3	—

Source: UEFA

=== Group 5 ===
Pos	Team	Pld	W	D	L	GF	GA	GD	Pts	Qualification	(Czech Republic)	(Netherlands)	(Norway)	(Belarus)	(Luxembourg)	(Malta)
1	Czech Republic	10	6	3	1	21	6	+15	21	Qualify for final tournament	—	3–1	2–0	4–2	3–0	6–1
2	Netherlands	10	6	2	2	23	5	+18	20 (Note: Head-to-head points: Netherlands 4, Norway 1.)	Advance to play-off	0–0	—	3–0	1–0	5–0	4–0
3	Norway	10	6	2	2	17	7	+10	20		1–1	1–1	—	1–0	5–0	2–0
4	Belarus	10	3	2	5	8	13	−5	11		0–2	1–0	0–4	—	2–0	1–1
5	Luxembourg	10	3	1	6	3	21	−18	10		1–0	0–4	0–2	0–0	—	1–0
6	Malta	10	0	2	8	2	22	−20	2		0–0	0–4	0–1	0–2	0–1	—

Source: UEFA

=== Group 6 ===
Pos	Team	Pld	W	D	L	GF	GA	GD	Pts	Qualification	(Portugal)	(Republic of Ireland)	(Northern Ireland)	(Austria)	(Latvia)	(Liechtenstein)
1	Portugal	10	7	2	1	29	7	+22	23	Qualify for final tournament	—	3–0	1–1	1–0	3–2	8–0
2	Republic of Ireland	10	5	2	3	17	11	+6	17 (Note: Head-to-head points: Republic of Ireland 4, Northern Ireland 1.)	Advance to play-off	1–0	—	1–1	1–3	2–1	4–0
3	Northern Ireland	10	5	2	3	20	15	+5	17		1–2	0–4	—	5–3	1–2	4–1
4	Austria	10	5	1	4	29	14	+15	16		1–1	3–1	1–2	—	5–0	7–0
5	Latvia	10	4	0	6	11	20	−9	12		1–3	0–3	0–1	3–2	—	1–0
6	Liechtenstein	10	0	1	9	1	40	−39	1		0–7	0–0	0–4	0–4	0–1	—

Source: UEFA

=== Group 7 ===
Pos	Team	Pld	W	D	L	GF	GA	GD	Pts	Qualification	(Germany)	(Bulgaria)	(Georgia (country))	(Moldova)	(Wales)	(Albania)
1	Germany	10	8	1	1	27	10	+17	25	Qualify for final tournament	—	3–1	4–1	6–1	1–1	2–1
2	Bulgaria	10	7	1	2	24	10	+14	22	Qualify for final tournament	3–2	—	2–0	4–1	3–1	3–0
3	Georgia	10	5	0	5	14	13	+1	15		0–2	2–1	—	0–1	5–0	2–0
4	Moldova	10	3	0	7	11	27	−16	9		0–3	0–3	3–2	—	3–2	2–3
5	Wales	10	2	2	6	9	19	−10	8 (Note: Head-to-head points: Wales 4, Albania 1.)		1–2	0–3	0–1	1–0	—	2–0
6	Albania	10	2	2	6	10	16	−6	8		1–2	1–1	0–1	3–0	1–1	—

Source: UEFA

=== Group 8 ===
Pos	Team	Pld	W	D	L	GF	GA	GD	Pts	Qualification	(Russia)	(Scotland)	(Greece)	(Finland)	(Faroe Islands)	(San Marino)
1	Russia	10	8	2	0	34	5	+29	26	Qualify for final tournament	—	0–0	2–1	3–1	3–0	4–0
2	Scotland	10	7	2	1	19	3	+16	23	Qualify for final tournament	1–1	—	1–0	1–0	5–1	5–0
3	Greece	10	6	0	4	23	9	+14	18		0–3	1–0	—	4–0	5–0	2–0
4	Finland	10	5	0	5	18	18	0	15		0–6	0–2	2–1	—	5–0	4–1
5	Faroe Islands	10	2	0	8	10	35	−25	6		2–5	0–2	1–5	0–4	—	3–0
6	San Marino	10	0	0	10	2	36	−34	0		0–7	0–2	0–4	0–2	1–3	—

Source: UEFA

=== Ranking of second-placed teams ===
The runners-up of each of the eight groups were ranked in a table to decide which seven of them would qualify. The best six runners-up would qualify automatically, while the two worst would compete in a play-off at a neutral venue to determine the final qualifier. Only games against teams ranked first, third and fourth in the group counted for the purpose of this ranking.

Pos	Grp	Team	Pld	W	D	L	GF	GA	GD	Pts	Qualification
1	4	Italy	6	4	1	1	12	4	+8	13	Qualify for final tournament
2	7	Bulgaria	6	4	0	2	14	8	+6	12	Qualify for final tournament
3	3	Turkey	6	3	2	1	11	8	+3	11	Qualify for final tournament
4	8	Scotland	6	3	2	1	5	2	+3	11	Qualify for final tournament
5	2	Denmark	6	3	2	1	9	7	+2	11	Qualify for final tournament
6	1	France	6	2	4	0	8	2	+6	10	Qualify for final tournament
7	5	Netherlands	6	2	2	2	6	5	+1	8	Advance to play-off
8	6	Republic of Ireland	6	2	1	3	8	10	−2	7	Advance to play-off

Source: RSSSF
Rules for classification: Counting only matches against teams ranked first to fourth in the group, 1) Points; 2) Goal difference; 3) Goals scored; 4) Away goals scored; 5) Drawing of lots.

== Play-off ==
The bottom two runners-up, the Republic of Ireland and the Netherlands, took part in a play-off on a neutral ground, Anfield, to determine the last team to qualify for the final tournament.

Team 1	Score	Team 2
Republic of Ireland	0–2	Netherlands

== Goalscorers ==
There were 680 goals scored in 231 matches, for an average of 2.94 goals per match.

12 goals

- (Croatia national football team) Davor Šuker

11 goals

- (Austria national football team) Toni Polster

10 goals

- (Bulgaria national football team) Hristo Stoichkov

9 goals

- (Germany national football team) Jürgen Klinsmann

7 goals

- (Bulgaria national football team) Emil Kostadinov
- (Finland national football team) Mixu Paatelainen
- (Italy national football team) Gianfranco Zola
- (Poland national football team) Andrzej Juskowiak
- (Turkey national football team) Hakan Şükür

6 goals

- (Czech Republic national football team) Patrik Berger
- (Israel national football team) Ronen Harazi
- (Portugal national football team) Domingos Paciência

5 goals

- (Belarus national football team) Syarhey Herasimets
- (Denmark national football team) Kim Vilfort
- (France national football team) Youri Djorkaeff
- (Latvia national football team) Vīts Rimkus
- (Northern Ireland national football team) Iain Dowie
- (Portugal national football team) Paulo Alves
- (Republic of Ireland national football team) John Aldridge
- (Romania national football team) Florin Răducioiu
- (Russia national football team) Igor Kolyvanov
- (Ukraine national football team) Tymerlan Huseynov

4 goals

- (Albania national football team) Sokol Kushta
- (Austria national football team) Peter Stöger
- (Belgium national football team) Marc Degryse
- (Denmark national football team) Michael Laudrup
- (Faroe Islands national football team) Todi Jónsson
- (Finland national football team) Jari Litmanen
- (Georgia national football team) Shota Arveladze
- (Georgia national football team) Temur Ketsbaia
- (Greece national football team) Alexis Alexandris
- (Greece national football team) Nikos Machlas
- (Greece national football team) Panagiotis Tsalouchidis
- (Italy national football team) Fabrizio Ravanelli
- (Netherlands national football team) Marc Overmars
- (Netherlands national football team) Clarence Seedorf
- (Northern Ireland national football team) Jimmy Quinn
- (Portugal national football team) Rui Costa
- (Russia national football team) Vasili Kulkov
- (Russia national football team) Dmitri Radchenko
- (Scotland national football team) Scott Booth
- (Scotland national football team) John Collins
- (Slovenia national football team) Zlatko Zahovič
- (Spain national football team) Fernando Hierro

3 goals

- (Bulgaria national football team) Krasimir Balakov
- (Cyprus national football team) Marios Agathokleous
- (Czech Republic national football team) Radek Drulák
- (Czech Republic national football team) Horst Siegl
- (Estonia national football team) Martin Reim
- (Georgia national football team) Georgi Kinkladze
- (Germany national football team) Ulf Kirsten
- (Germany national football team) Andreas Möller
- (Israel national football team) Ronny Rosenthal
- (Latvia national football team) Armands Zeiberliņš
- (Lithuania national football team) Darius Maciulevičius
- (Lithuania national football team) Arūnas Šuika
- (North Macedonia national football team) Boško Gjurovski
- (Netherlands national football team) Ronald de Boer
- (Netherlands national football team) Wim Jonk
- (Netherlands national football team) Patrick Kluivert
- (Netherlands national football team) Youri Mulder
- (Netherlands national football team) Bryan Roy
- (Northern Ireland national football team) Phil Gray
- (Northern Ireland national football team) Michael O'Neill
- (Norway national football team) Henning Berg
- (Norway national football team) Jan Åge Fjørtoft
- (Norway national football team) Kjetil Rekdal
- (Poland national football team) Roman Kosecki
- (Portugal national football team) Luís Figo
- (Portugal national football team) João Pinto
- (Republic of Ireland national football team) Niall Quinn
- (Romania national football team) Marius Lăcătuș
- (Russia national football team) Sergei Kiriakov
- (Slovakia national football team) Peter Dubovský
- (Slovakia national football team) Tibor Jančula
- (Slovenia national football team) Primož Gliha
- (Slovenia national football team) Sašo Udovič
- (Spain national football team) Julio Salinas
- (Switzerland national football team) Kubilay Türkyilmaz

2 goals

- (Albania national football team) Altin Rraklli
- (Armenia national football team) Razmik Grigoryan
- (Armenia national football team) Armen Shahgeldyan
- (Austria national football team) Andi Herzog
- (Austria national football team) Adi Hütter
- (Azerbaijan national football team) Nazim Suleymanov
- (Belgium national football team) Gilles De Bilde
- (Belgium national football team) Georges Grün
- (Belgium national football team) Luc Nilis
- (Belgium national football team) Gunther Schepens
- (Belgium national football team) Enzo Scifo
- (Bulgaria national football team) Lyuboslav Penev
- (Croatia national football team) Zvonimir Boban
- (Croatia national football team) Robert Prosinečki
- (Cyprus national football team) Andreas Sotiriou
- (Czech Republic national football team) Tomáš Skuhravý
- (Denmark national football team) Mikkel Beck
- (Denmark national football team) Michael Schjønberg
- (Finland national football team) Ari Hjelm
- (Finland national football team) Antti Sumiala
- (France national football team) Vincent Guérin
- (France national football team) Frank Leboeuf
- (France national football team) Zinedine Zidane
- (Germany national football team) Lothar Matthäus
- (Germany national football team) Matthias Sammer
- (Greece national football team) Georgios Donis
- (Greece national football team) Demis Nikolaidis
- (Hungary national football team) Gábor Halmai
- (Hungary national football team) Béla Illés
- (Hungary national football team) József Kiprich
- (Italy national football team) Demetrio Albertini
- (Lithuania national football team) Valdas Ivanauskas
- (Moldova national football team) Serghei Cleșcenco
- (Moldova national football team) Iurie Miterev
- (Norway national football team) Øyvind Leonhardsen
- (Poland national football team) Piotr Nowak
- (Portugal national football team) Paulinho Santos
- (Republic of Ireland national football team) Tommy Coyne
- (Republic of Ireland national football team) John Sheridan
- (Romania national football team) Gheorghe Hagi
- (Romania national football team) Dorinel Munteanu
- (Russia national football team) Vladimir Beschastnykh
- (Russia national football team) Valeri Karpin
- (Russia national football team) Yuriy Nikiforov
- (Russia national football team) Igor Shalimov
- (Scotland national football team) Ally McCoist
- (Scotland national football team) John McGinlay
- (Scotland national football team) Billy McKinlay
- (Slovakia national football team) Jaroslav Timko
- (Slovenia national football team) Džoni Novak
- (Spain national football team) José Luis Caminero
- (Spain national football team) Donato
- (Spain national football team) Luis Enrique
- (Spain national football team) Julen Guerrero
- (Spain national football team) Juan Antonio Pizzi
- (Sweden men's national football team) Kennet Andersson
- (Sweden men's national football team) Tomas Brolin
- (Sweden men's national football team) Martin Dahlin
- (Switzerland national football team) Thomas Bickel
- (Switzerland national football team) Christophe Ohrel
- (Switzerland national football team) Ciriaco Sforza
- (Switzerland national football team) Nestor Subiat
- (Turkey national football team) Saffet Sancaklı
- (Turkey national football team) Sergen Yalçın
- (Wales national football team) Dean Saunders
- (Wales national football team) Gary Speed

1 goal

- (Albania national football team) Arjan Bellaj
- (Albania national football team) Salvador Kaçaj
- (Albania national football team) Rudi Vata
- (Albania national football team) Hysen Zmijani
- (Armenia national football team) Artur Petrosyan
- (Austria national football team) Franz Aigner
- (Austria national football team) Dietmar Kühbauer
- (Austria national football team) Andreas Ogris
- (Austria national football team) Heimo Pfeifenberger
- (Austria national football team) Marcus Pürk
- (Austria national football team) Dieter Ramusch
- (Austria national football team) Herfried Sabitzer
- (Austria national football team) Markus Schopp
- (Austria national football team) Christian Stumpf
- (Austria national football team) Arnold Wetl
- (Belarus national football team) Ihar Hurynovich
- (Belarus national football team) Miroslav Romaschenko
- (Belarus national football team) Alyaksandr Taykow
- (Belgium national football team) Gert Verheyen
- (Belgium national football team) Bruno Versavel
- (Bulgaria national football team) Trifon Ivanov
- (Bulgaria national football team) Yordan Letchkov
- (Croatia national football team) Alen Bokšić
- (Croatia national football team) Nikola Jerkan
- (Croatia national football team) Nikola Jurčević
- (Croatia national football team) Ardian Kozniku
- (Croatia national football team) Mladen Mladenović
- (Croatia national football team) Igor Štimac
- (Cyprus national football team) Costas Fasouliotis
- (Czech Republic national football team) Martin Frýdek
- (Czech Republic national football team) Miroslav Kadlec
- (Czech Republic national football team) Luboš Kubík
- (Czech Republic national football team) Pavel Kuka
- (Czech Republic national football team) Václav Němeček
- (Czech Republic national football team) Daniel Šmejkal
- (Czech Republic national football team) Jan Suchopárek
- (Denmark national football team) John Jensen
- (Denmark national football team) Brian Laudrup
- (Denmark national football team) Allan Nielsen
- (Denmark national football team) Peter Nielsen
- (Denmark national football team) Flemming Povlsen
- (Denmark national football team) Mark Strudal
- (Faroe Islands national football team) Jens Kristian Hansen
- (Faroe Islands national football team) Henning Jarnskor
- (Faroe Islands national football team) Julian Johnsson
- (Faroe Islands national football team) Jan Allan Müller
- (Faroe Islands national football team) Jens Erik Rasmussen
- (Finland national football team) Petri Helin
- (Finland national football team) Janne Lindberg
- (Finland national football team) Kim Suominen
- (France national football team) Laurent Blanc
- (France national football team) Christophe Cocard
- (France national football team) Marcel Desailly
- (France national football team) Christophe Dugarry
- (France national football team) David Ginola
- (France national football team) Christian Karembeu
- (France national football team) Bixente Lizarazu
- (France national football team) Patrice Loko
- (France national football team) Jean-Pierre Papin
- (France national football team) Reynald Pedros
- (Georgia national football team) Gocha Gogrichiani
- (Georgia national football team) Zaza Janashia
- (Germany national football team) Markus Babbel
- (Germany national football team) Thomas Häßler
- (Germany national football team) Thomas Helmer
- (Germany national football team) Heiko Herrlich
- (Germany national football team) Thomas Strunz
- (Germany national football team) Christian Ziege
- (Greece national football team) Stratos Apostolakis
- (Greece national football team) Daniel Batista
- (Greece national football team) Kostas Frantzeskos
- (Greece national football team) Georgios Georgiadis
- (Greece national football team) Dimitris Markos
- (Greece national football team) Dimitris Saravakos
- (Greece national football team) Vasilios Tsiartas
- (Hungary national football team) István Vincze
- (Iceland national football team) Guðni Bergsson
- (Iceland national football team) Arnar Gunnlaugsson
- (Iceland national football team) Sigurður Jónsson
- (Israel national football team) Tal Banin
- (Israel national football team) Eyal Berkovic
- (Israel national football team) Haim Revivo
- (Israel national football team) Itzik Zohar
- (Italy national football team) Dino Baggio
- (Italy national football team) Pierluigi Casiraghi
- (Italy national football team) Alessandro Costacurta
- (Italy national football team) Alessandro Del Piero
- (Italy national football team) Attilio Lombardo
- (Italy national football team) Paolo Maldini
- (Italy national football team) Christian Panucci
- (Latvia national football team) Vitālijs Astafjevs
- (Latvia national football team) Vladimirs Babičevs
- (Latvia national football team) Jevgeņijs Miļevskis
- (Liechtenstein national football team) Daniel Hasler
- (Lithuania national football team) Aurelijus Skarbalius
- (Lithuania national football team) Vaidotas Šlekys
- (Lithuania national football team) Ramūnas Stonkus
- (Lithuania national football team) Vyacheslav Sukristov
- (Lithuania national football team) Audrius Žuta
- (Luxembourg national football team) Manuel Cardoni
- (Luxembourg national football team) Guy Hellers
- (Luxembourg national football team) Luc Holtz
- (North Macedonia national football team) Zoran Boškovski
- (North Macedonia national football team) Gjorgji Hristov
- (North Macedonia national football team) Borče Jovanovski
- (North Macedonia national football team) Ljupčo Markovski
- (North Macedonia national football team) Toni Micevski
- (North Macedonia national football team) Mitko Stojkovski
- (Malta national football team) David Carabott
- (Malta national football team) Kristian Laferla
- (Moldova national football team) Serghei Belous
- (Moldova national football team) Alexandru Curteian
- (Moldova national football team) Igor Oprea
- (Moldova national football team) Valeriu Pogorelov
- (Moldova national football team) Radu Rebeja
- (Moldova national football team) Serghei Secu
- (Moldova national football team) Ion Testemițanu
- (Netherlands national football team) Dennis Bergkamp
- (Netherlands national football team) Aron Winter
- (Northern Ireland national football team) Keith Gillespie
- (Northern Ireland national football team) Michael Hughes
- (Northern Ireland national football team) Barry Hunter
- (Northern Ireland national football team) Steve Lomas
- (Northern Ireland national football team) Gerry McMahon
- (Norway national football team) Gunnar Aase
- (Norway national football team) Lars Bohinen
- (Norway national football team) Harald Brattbakk
- (Norway national football team) Jostein Flo
- (Norway national football team) Geir Frigård
- (Norway national football team) Mini Jakobsen
- (Poland national football team) Wojciech Kowalczyk
- (Poland national football team) Tomasz Wieszczycki
- (Portugal national football team) Jorge Cadete
- (Portugal national football team) Fernando Couto
- (Portugal national football team) António Folha
- (Portugal national football team) Hélder
- (Portugal national football team) Oceano
- (Portugal national football team) Carlos Secretário
- (Republic of Ireland national football team) Ray Houghton
- (Republic of Ireland national football team) Roy Keane
- (Republic of Ireland national football team) Paul McGrath
- (Republic of Ireland national football team) Andy Townsend
- (Romania national football team) Miodrag Belodedici
- (Romania national football team) Ilie Dumitrescu
- (Romania national football team) Dan Petrescu
- (Romania national football team) Gheorghe Popescu
- (Romania national football team) Daniel Prodan
- (Russia national football team) Dmitri Cheryshev
- (Russia national football team) Igor Dobrovolski
- (Russia national football team) Valery Kechinov
- (Russia national football team) Aleksandr Mostovoi
- (Russia national football team) Mukhsin Mukhamadiev
- (Russia national football team) Viktor Onopko
- (Russia national football team) Nikolai Pisarev
- (Russia national football team) Ilya Tsymbalar
- (San Marino national football team) Pier Domenico Della Valle
- (San Marino national football team) Mauro Valentini
- (Scotland national football team) Colin Calderwood
- (Scotland national football team) Eoin Jess
- (Scotland national football team) Pat Nevin
- (Scotland national football team) Duncan Shearer
- (Slovakia national football team) Miroslav Chvíla
- (Slovakia national football team) Ľubomír Moravčík
- (Slovakia national football team) Štefan Rusnák
- (Slovakia national football team) Július Šimon
- (Slovakia national football team) Dušan Tittel
- (Slovakia national football team) Marek Ujlaky
- (Slovenia national football team) Vladimir Kokol
- (Spain national football team) José Emilio Amavisca
- (Spain national football team) Andoni Goikoetxea
- (Spain national football team) Francisco Higuera
- (Spain national football team) Kiko
- (Spain national football team) Javier Manjarín
- (Spain national football team) Miguel Ángel Nadal
- (Spain national football team) Alfonso Pérez
- (Sweden men's national football team) Niclas Alexandersson
- (Sweden men's national football team) Klas Ingesson
- (Sweden men's national football team) Jörgen Pettersson
- (Switzerland national football team) Marc Hottiger
- (Switzerland national football team) Adrian Knup
- (Switzerland national football team) Marcel Koller
- (Turkey national football team) Emre Aşık
- (Turkey national football team) Recep Çetin
- (Turkey national football team) Bülent Korkmaz
- (Turkey national football team) Ertuğrul Sağlam
- (Turkey national football team) Ogün Temizkanoğlu
- (Ukraine national football team) Andriy Husin
- (Ukraine national football team) Yuriy Kalitvintsev
- (Ukraine national football team) Serhiy Konovalov
- (Ukraine national football team) Andriy Polunin
- (Ukraine national football team) Viktor Skrypnyk
- (Wales national football team) Nathan Blake
- (Wales national football team) Chris Coleman
- (Wales national football team) Ryan Giggs
- (Wales national football team) Mark Pembridge
- (Wales national football team) Kit Symons

1 own goal

- (Armenia national football team) Yervand Krbachyan (against Belgium)
- (Cyprus national football team) Marios Charalambous (against Spain)
- (Estonia national football team) Urmas Kirs (against Ukraine)
- (Greece national football team) Stratos Apostolakis (against Faroe Islands)
- (Greece national football team) Marinos Ouzounidis (against Russia)
- (Greece national football team) Theodoros Zagorakis (against Russia)
- (Moldova national football team) Vitali Culibaba (against Georgia)
- (Moldova national football team) Serghei Stroenco (against Germany)
- (Poland national football team) Józef Wandzik (against Romania)
- (Portugal national football team) Vítor Baía (against Republic of Ireland)
- (San Marino national football team) Fabio Francini (against Scotland)
- (Slovakia national football team) Ondrej Krištofík (against France)
- (Sweden men's national football team) Jesper Blomqvist (against Switzerland)
- (Wales national football team) Andy Melville (against Germany)
