= Bazaly =

Football stadium in the Czech Republic

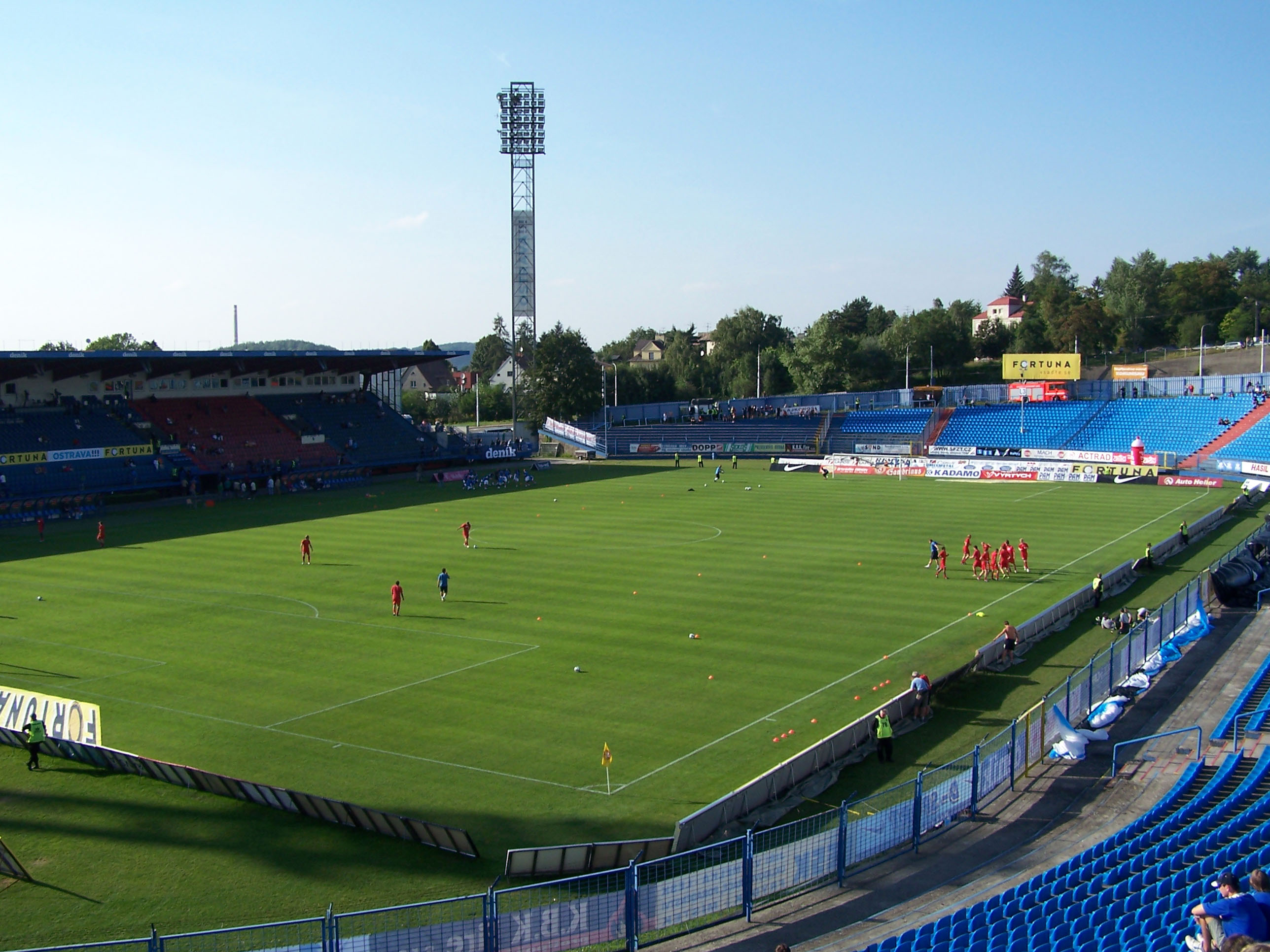
- Interactive map of Bazaly
- Location: Slezská Ostrava, Ostrava, Czech Republic
- Coordinates: 49°50′42″N 18°17′58″E
- Owner: FC Baník Ostrava
- Capacity: 10,039
- Surface: Grass
- Field size: 105m x 68m

Construction
- Opened: April 19, 1959
- Renovated: 2003
- Closed: 2015
- Cost: 30 million CZK (reconstruction)

Tenant
- FC Baník Ostrava

The Bazaly stadium is a football stadium in Ostrava, Czech Republic. It lays in Slezská Ostrava, the Silesian part of the city, next to the Ostravice River. The first match was played there on 19 April 1959, it functioned as the home stadium of FC Baník Ostrava until the end of the 2014–15 Czech First League season.

The stadium was reconstructed in 2003 (added new seats, new V.I.P. rooms, cloak-rooms and press center). The cost was about 30 mil. CZK, cca. 1mil. EUR), and the pitch was replaced in 2004. In June 2014 a new capacity of 10,039 was announced for the forthcoming season. The stadium was closed in 2015, and Baník Ostrava went on to play at Městský stadion instead.

Heavy metal band Iron Maiden played at the stadium for a 38,000 capacity crowd on 6 June 2007. It was the biggest rock concert in Ostrava.

== International matches ==
Bazaly has hosted two competitive and three friendly matches of the Czech Republic national football team.

25 May 1994 International Friendly	Czech Republic	5–3	Lithuania	Ostrava, Czech Republic
Match 511/3	Kuka 19', 50'; Frýdek Sr. 22'; Kubík 27'; M. Poštulka 80'	ČMFS Report	Narbekovas 52'; Žalys 74'; Stumbrys 84'	Stadium: Bazaly; Attendance: 8,407; Referee: Kowalczyk (Poland)

6 September 1994 UEFA Euro 1996; Qualifying Group 5	Czech Republic	6–1	Malta	Ostrava, Czech Republic
16:30 UTC+2; Match 514/6	Šmejkal 5' (pen.); Kubík 32'; Siegl 34', 60', 77'; Berger 86'	UEFA Report	Laferla 63'	Stadium: Bazaly; Attendance: 10,226; Referee: Loizou (Cyprus)

29 March 1995 UEFA Euro 1996; Qualifying Group 5	Czech Republic	4–2	Belarus	Ostrava, Czech Republic
16:30 UTC+2; Match 518/10	Mir. Kadlec 5'; Berger 17', 62'; Kuka 68'	UEFA Report	Herasimets 45' (pen.); Hurynovich 88'	Stadium: Bazaly; Attendance: 5,549; Referee: Veissière (France)

12 March 1997 International Friendly	Czech Republic	2–1	Poland	Ostrava, Czech Republic
Match 544/36	Kuka 21'; K. Rada 64'	ČMFS Report	J. Zieliński 90'	Stadium: Bazaly; Attendance: 15,817; Referee: Zhuk (Belarus)

16 August 2000 International Friendly	Czech Republic	0–1	Slovenia	Ostrava, Czech Republic
Match 586/78		ČMFS Report	Pavlin 59'	Stadium: Bazaly; Attendance: 4,828; Referee: Hanacsek (Hungary)
