= UEFA Euro 1996 qualifying Group 5 =

Football tournament qualification stage

Standings and results for Group 5 of the UEFA Euro 1996 qualifying tournament.

== Standings ==
Pos	Team	Pld	W	D	L	GF	GA	GD	Pts	Qualification	(Czech Republic)	(Netherlands)	(Norway)	(Belarus)	(Luxembourg)	(Malta)
1	Czech Republic	10	6	3	1	21	6	+15	21	Qualify for final tournament	—	3–1	2–0	4–2	3–0	6–1
2	Netherlands	10	6	2	2	23	5	+18	20 (Note: Head-to-head points: Netherlands 4, Norway 1.)	Advance to play-off	0–0	—	3–0	1–0	5–0	4–0
3	Norway	10	6	2	2	17	7	+10	20		1–1	1–1	—	1–0	5–0	2–0
4	Belarus	10	3	2	5	8	13	−5	11		0–2	1–0	0–4	—	2–0	1–1
5	Luxembourg	10	3	1	6	3	21	−18	10		1–0	0–4	0–2	0–0	—	1–0
6	Malta	10	0	2	8	2	22	−20	2		0–0	0–4	0–1	0–2	0–1	—

Source: UEFA
Rules for classification: Qualification tiebreakers

== Results ==
6 September 1994
16:30 UTC+2

Czech Republic	6–1	Malta
Šmejkal 5' (pen.); Kubík 32'; Siegl 34', 60', 77'; Berger 86'	Report	Laferla 63'

Bazaly, Ostrava
Attendance: 10,226
Referee: Loizos Loizou (Cyprus)
7 September 1994
20:15 UTC+2

Luxembourg	0–4	Netherlands
	Report	Roy 23'; R.de Boer 65', 67'; Jonk 90'

Stade Josy Barthel, Luxembourg City
Attendance: 8,120
Referee: Alan Snoddy (Northern Ireland)
7 September 1994
20:00 UTC+2

Norway	1–0	Belarus
Frigård 88'	Report

Ullevaal, Oslo
Attendance: 16,739
Referee: Guy Goethals (Belgium)

12 October 1994
18:15 UTC+1

Malta	0–0	Czech Republic
	Report

Ta' Qali National Stadium, Ta' Qali
Attendance: 3,088
Referee: Jorge Monteiro Coroado (Portugal)
12 October 1994
19:45 UTC+1

Norway	1–1	Netherlands
Rekdal 52' (pen.)	Report	Roy 22'

Ullevaal, Oslo
Attendance: 22,293
Referee: Jim McCluskey (Scotland)
12 October 1994
20:00 UTC+2

Belarus	2–0	Luxembourg
Romaschenko 68'; Herasimets 76'	Report

Dinamo Stadium, Minsk
Attendance: 6,549
Referee: Richard O'Hanlon (Ireland)

16 November 1994
19:00 UTC+2

Belarus	0–4	Norway
	Report	Berg 34'; Leonhardsen 39'; Bohinen 52'; Rekdal 83' (pen.)

Dinamo Stadium, Minsk
Attendance: 5,711
Referee: Lube Spasov (Bulgaria)
16 November 1994
20:15 UTC+1

Netherlands	0–0	Czech Republic
	Report

De Kuip, Rotterdam
Attendance: 41,155
Referee: Sándor Puhl (Hungary)

14 December 1994
20:15 UTC+1

Netherlands	5–0	Luxembourg
Mulder 7'; Roy 17'; Jonk 40'; R.de Boer 52'; Seedorf 90'	Report

De Kuip, Rotterdam
Attendance: 26,000
Referee: Daniel Roduit (Switzerland)
14 December 1994
19:15 UTC+1

Malta	0–1	Norway
	Report	Fjørtoft 10'

Ta' Qali National Stadium, Ta' Qali
Attendance: 5,717
Referee: Gianni Beschin (Italy)

22 February 1995
19:15 UTC+1

Malta	0–1	Luxembourg
	Report	Cardoni 55'

Ta' Qali National Stadium, Ta' Qali
Attendance: 7,327
Referee: Mateo Beusan (Croatia)

29 March 1995
20:00 UTC+2

Luxembourg	0–2	Norway
	Report	Leonhardsen 35'; Aase 77'

Stade Josy Barthel, Luxembourg City
Attendance: 3,031
Referee: Nikolai Levnikov (Russia)
29 March 1995
20:15 UTC+2

Netherlands	4–0	Malta
Seedorf 38'; Bergkamp 77' (pen.); Winter 79'; Kluivert 84'	Report

De Kuip, Rotterdam
Attendance: 30,288
Referee: Gylfi Thór Orrason (Iceland)
29 March 1995
16:30 UTC+2

Czech Republic	4–2	Belarus
Kadlec 5'; Berger 17', 62'; Kuka 68'	Report	Herasimets 45' (pen.); Hurynovich 88'

Bazaly, Ostrava
Attendance: 5,549
Referee: Gilles Veissière (France)

26 April 1995
19:00 UTC+3

Belarus	1–1	Malta
Taykow 57'	Report	Carabott 71'

Dinamo Stadium, Minsk
Attendance: 6,915
Referee: Ladislav Gadoši (Slovakia)
26 April 1995
20:15 UTC+2

Czech Republic	3–1	Netherlands
Skuhravý 49'; Němeček 57'; Berger 62'	Report	Jonk 7'

Letná Stadium, Prague
Attendance: 17,463
Referee: Hellmut Krug (Germany)
26 April 1995
20:00 UTC+2

Norway	5–0	Luxembourg
Jakobsen 11'; Fjørtoft 12'; Brattbakk 24'; Berg 46'; Rekdal 52'	Report

Ullevaal, Oslo
Attendance: 15,124
Referee: John Ferry (Northern Ireland)

7 June 1995
20:00 UTC+2

Luxembourg	1–0	Czech Republic
Hellers 89'	Report

Stade Josy Barthel, Luxembourg City
Attendance: 1,030
Referee: John Ashman (Wales)
7 June 1995
19:45 UTC+2

Norway	2–0	Malta
Fjørtoft 43'; Flo 88'	Report

Ullevaal, Oslo
Attendance: 15,180
Referee: Zbigniew Przesmycki (Poland)
7 June 1995
20:00 UTC+3

Belarus	1–0	Netherlands
Herasimets 27'	Report

Dinamo Stadium, Minsk
Attendance: 20,633
Referee: Adrian Porumboiu (Romania)

16 August 1995
20:15 UTC+2

Norway	1–1	Czech Republic
Berg 27'	Report	Suchopárek 85'

Ullevaal, Oslo
Attendance: 22,054
Referee: Sergei Khusainov (Russia)

6 September 1995
20:15 UTC+2

Czech Republic	2–0	Norway
Skuhravý 6' (pen.); Drulák 87'	Report

Letná Stadium, Prague
Attendance: 19,522
Referee: Kurt Röthlisberger (Switzerland)
6 September 1995
20:15 UTC+2

Netherlands	1–0	Belarus
Mulder 83'	Report

De Kuip, Rotterdam
Attendance: 18,830
Referee: Robert Sedlacek (Austria)
6 September 1995
20:00 UTC+2

Luxembourg	1–0	Malta
Holtz 44'	Report

Stade Josy Barthel, Luxembourg City
Attendance: 4,809
Referee: Algirdas Dubinskas (Lithuania)

7 October 1995
18:00 UTC+2

Belarus	0–2	Czech Republic
	Report	Frýdek 25'; Berger 84'

Dinamo Stadium, Minsk
Attendance: 6,801
Referee: Anders Frisk (Sweden)

11 October 1995
20:00 UTC+1

Malta	0–4	Netherlands
	Report	Overmars 52', 61', 66'; Seedorf 82'

Ta' Qali National Stadium, Ta' Qali
Attendance: 10,502
Referee: Kim Milton Nielsen (Denmark)
11 October 1995
20:00 UTC+1

Luxembourg	0–0	Belarus
	Report

Stade Josy Barthel, Luxembourg City
Attendance: 4,272
Referee: Paul Durkin (England)

12 November 1995
15:00 UTC+1

Malta	0–2	Belarus
	Report	Herasimets 79', 83'

Ta' Qali National Stadium, Ta' Qali
Attendance: 3,025
Referee: Metin Tokat (Turkey)
15 November 1995
20:05 UTC+1

Czech Republic	3–0	Luxembourg
Drulák 37', 46'; Berger 57'	Report

Letná Stadium, Prague
Attendance: 20,239
Referee: Alfred Wieser (Austria)
15 November 1995
20:05 UTC+1

Netherlands	3–0	Norway
Seedorf 47'; Mulder 88'; Overmars 89'	Report

De Kuip, Rotterdam
Attendance: 42,325
Referee: Dermot Gallagher (England)

== Goalscorers ==
There were 74 goals scored in 30 matches, for an average of 2.47 goals per match.

6 goals

- (Czech Republic national football team) Patrik Berger

5 goals

- (Belarus national football team) Syarhey Herasimets

4 goals

- (Netherlands national football team) Marc Overmars
- (Netherlands national football team) Clarence Seedorf

3 goals

- (Czech Republic national football team) Radek Drulák
- (Czech Republic national football team) Horst Siegl
- (Netherlands national football team) Ronald de Boer
- (Netherlands national football team) Wim Jonk
- (Netherlands national football team) Youri Mulder
- (Netherlands national football team) Bryan Roy
- (Norway national football team) Henning Berg
- (Norway national football team) Jan Åge Fjørtoft
- (Norway national football team) Kjetil Rekdal

2 goals

- (Czech Republic national football team) Tomáš Skuhravý
- (Norway national football team) Øyvind Leonhardsen

1 goal

- (Belarus national football team) Ihar Hurynovich
- (Belarus national football team) Miroslav Romaschenko
- (Belarus national football team) Alyaksandr Taykow
- (Czech Republic national football team) Martin Frýdek
- (Czech Republic national football team) Miroslav Kadlec
- (Czech Republic national football team) Luboš Kubík
- (Czech Republic national football team) Pavel Kuka
- (Czech Republic national football team) Václav Němeček
- (Czech Republic national football team) Daniel Šmejkal
- (Czech Republic national football team) Jan Suchopárek
- (Luxembourg national football team) Manuel Cardoni
- (Luxembourg national football team) Guy Hellers
- (Luxembourg national football team) Luc Holtz
- (Malta national football team) David Carabott
- (Malta national football team) Kristian Laferla
- (Netherlands national football team) Dennis Bergkamp
- (Netherlands national football team) Patrick Kluivert
- (Netherlands national football team) Aron Winter
- (Norway national football team) Gunnar Aase
- (Norway national football team) Lars Bohinen
- (Norway national football team) Harald Brattbakk
- (Norway national football team) Jostein Flo
- (Norway national football team) Geir Frigård
- (Norway national football team) Mini Jakobsen
