= UEFA Euro 1996 qualifying Group 6 =

Standings and results for Group 6 of the UEFA Euro 1996 qualifying tournament.

== Standings ==
Pos	Team	Pld	W	D	L	GF	GA	GD	Pts	Qualification	(Portugal)	(Republic of Ireland)	(Northern Ireland)	(Austria)	(Latvia)	(Liechtenstein)
1	Portugal	10	7	2	1	29	7	+22	23	Qualify for final tournament	—	3–0	1–1	1–0	3–2	8–0
2	Republic of Ireland	10	5	2	3	17	11	+6	17 (Note: Head-to-head points: Republic of Ireland 4, Northern Ireland 1.)	Advance to play-off	1–0	—	1–1	1–3	2–1	4–0
3	Northern Ireland	10	5	2	3	20	15	+5	17		1–2	0–4	—	5–3	1–2	4–1
4	Austria	10	5	1	4	29	14	+15	16		1–1	3–1	1–2	—	5–0	7–0
5	Latvia	10	4	0	6	11	20	−9	12		1–3	0–3	0–1	3–2	—	1–0
6	Liechtenstein	10	0	1	9	1	40	−39	1		0–7	0–0	0–4	0–4	0–1	—

Source: UEFA
Rules for classification: Qualification tiebreakers

== Matches ==
20 April 1994
20:00 UTC+1

Northern Ireland	4–1	Liechtenstein
Quinn 5', 34'; Lomas 25'; Dowie 48'	Report	Hasler 84'

Windsor Park, Belfast
Attendance: 7,150
Referee: Roelof Luinge (Netherlands)

7 September 1994
20:00 UTC+3

Latvia	0–3	Republic of Ireland
	Report	Aldridge 16', 75' (pen.); Sheridan 29'

Daugava Stadium, Riga
Attendance: 3,226
Referee: Anders Frisk (Sweden)
7 September 1994
17:00 UTC+2

Liechtenstein	0–4	Austria
	Report	Polster 18', 45', 78'; Aigner 22'

Sportpark, Eschen
Attendance: 5,800
Referee: Wieland Ziller (Germany)
7 September 1994
20:00 UTC+1

Northern Ireland	1–2	Portugal
Quinn 58' (pen.)	Report	Rui Costa 8'; Domingos 81'

Windsor Park, Belfast
Attendance: 6,301
Referee: Rune Pedersen (Norway)

9 October 1994
19:00 UTC+2

Latvia	1–3	Portugal
Miļevskis 87'	Report	João Pinto 31', 69'; Figo 70'

Daugava Stadium, Riga
Attendance: 5,400
Referee: Eric Blareau (Belgium)
12 October 1994
19:35 UTC+1

Austria	1–2	Northern Ireland
Polster 24' (pen.)	Report	Gillespie 3'; Gray 36'

Ernst Happel Stadion, Vienna
Attendance: 19,742
Referee: Antonio Jesús Lõpez Nieto (Spain)
12 October 1994
20:30 UTC+1

Republic of Ireland	4–0	Liechtenstein
Coyne 2', 4'; Quinn 30', 82'	Report

Lansdowne Road, Dublin
Attendance: 32,980
Referee: Bragi Bergmann (Iceland)

13 November 1994
18:00 UTC+1

Portugal	1–0	Austria
Figo 37'	Report

Estádio José Alvalade, Lisbon
Attendance: 22,273
Referee: Peter Mikkelsen (Denmark)
15 November 1994
14:00 UTC+1

Liechtenstein	0–1	Latvia
	Report	Babičevs 14'

Sportpark, Eschen
Attendance: 1,300
Referee: Piotr Werner (Poland)
16 November 1994
20:00 UTC

Northern Ireland	0–4	Republic of Ireland
	Report	Aldridge 6'; Keane 11'; Sheridan 38'; Townsend 54'

Windsor Park, Belfast
Attendance: 10,336
Referee: Serge Muhmenthaler (Switzerland)

18 December 1994
18:00 UTC+1

Portugal	8–0	Liechtenstein
Domingos 2', 11'; Oceano 45'; João Pinto 56'; Couto 72'; Folha 74'; Alves 75', 79'	Report

Estádio da Luz, Lisbon
Attendance: 22,800
Referee: Lubomír Puček (Czech Republic)

29 March 1995
14:30 UTC+1

Republic of Ireland	1–1	Northern Ireland
Quinn 47'	Report	Dowie 72'

Lansdowne Road, Dublin
Attendance: 32,700
Referee: Mario van der Ende (Netherlands)
29 March 1995
18:25 UTC+2

Austria	5–0	Latvia
Herzog 17', 59'; Pfeifenberger 40'; Polster 71' (pen.), 90+1'	Report

Stadion Lehen, Salzburg
Attendance: 5,262
Referee: Charles Agius (Malta)

26 April 1995
19:00 UTC+3

Latvia	0–1	Northern Ireland
	Report	Dowie 70' (pen.)

Daugava Stadium, Riga
Attendance: 1,560
Referee: Finn Lambeck (Denmark)
26 April 1995
18:25 UTC+2

Austria	7–0	Liechtenstein
Kühbauer 7'; Polster 10', 54' (pen.); Sabitzer 80'; Pürk 84'; Hütter 87', 89'	Report

Stadion Lehen, Salzburg
Attendance: 5,700
Referee: Vasiliy Melnichuk (Ukraine)
26 April 1995
19:30 UTC+1

Republic of Ireland	1–0	Portugal
Vítor Baía 44' (o.g.)	Report

Lansdowne Road, Dublin
Attendance: 33,500
Referee: Christer Fällström (Sweden)

3 June 1995
22:00 UTC+2

Portugal	3–2	Latvia
Figo 5'; Secretário 19'; Domingos 20'	Report	Rimkus 51', 85'

Estádio das Antas, Porto
Attendance: 26,619
Referee: Zoran Petrović (FR Yugoslavia)
3 June 1995
18:00 UTC+2

Liechtenstein	0–0	Republic of Ireland
	Report

Sportpark, Eschen
Attendance: 4,500
Referee: Charles Agius (Malta)

7 June 1995
20:00 UTC+1

Northern Ireland	1–2	Latvia
Dowie 44'	Report	Zeiberliņš 59'; Astafjevs 62'

Windsor Park, Belfast
Attendance: 6,935
Referee: Juan Ansuátegui Roca (Spain)
11 June 1995
16:00 UTC+1

Republic of Ireland	1–3	Austria
Houghton 65'	Report	Polster 69', 78'; Ogris 72'

Lansdowne Road, Dublin
Attendance: 33,000
Referee: Markus Merk (Germany)

15 August 1995
18:00 UTC+2

Liechtenstein	0–7	Portugal
	Report	Domingos 25'; Santos 33'; Rui Costa 41', 70' (pen.); Alves 66', 73', 90'

Sportpark, Eschen
Attendance: 3,500
Referee: Dragutin Poljak (Croatia)
16 August 1995
20:00 UTC+3

Latvia	3–2	Austria
Rimkus 11', 59'; Zeiberliņš 88'	Report	Polster 68'; Ramusch 78'

Daugava Stadium, Riga
Attendance: 2,600
Referee: Ilkka Koho (Finland)

3 September 1995
22:00 UTC+2

Portugal	1–1	Northern Ireland
Domingos 47'	Report	Hughes 66'

Estádio das Antas, Porto
Attendance: 26,780
Referee: Rémi Harrel (France)
6 September 1995
20:30 UTC+2

Austria	3–1	Republic of Ireland
Stöger 3', 64', 77'	Report	McGrath 74'

Ernst Happel Stadion, Vienna
Attendance: 24,000
Referee: Ahmet Çakar (Turkey)
6 September 1995
18:30 UTC+3

Latvia	1–0	Liechtenstein
Zeiberliņš 83'	Report

Daugava Stadium, Riga
Attendance: 3,800
Referee: Tom Henning Øvrebø (Norway)

11 October 1995
20:30 UTC+1

Austria	1–1	Portugal
Stöger 21'	Report	Santos 49'

Ernst Happel Stadion, Vienna
Attendance: 44,000
Referee: Nikolai Levnikov (Russia)
11 October 1995
20:30 UTC+1

Republic of Ireland	2–1	Latvia
Aldridge 61' (pen.), 64'	Report	Rimkus 78'

Lansdowne Road, Dublin
Attendance: 33,500
Referee: Juan Fernández Marín (Spain)
11 October 1995
15:00 UTC+1

Liechtenstein	0–4	Northern Ireland
	Report	O'Neill 36'; McMahon 49'; Quinn 55'; Gray 72'

Sportpark, Eschen
Attendance: 1,100
Referee: Ľuboš Micheľ (Slovakia)

15 November 1995
21:00 UTC+1

Portugal	3–0	Republic of Ireland
Rui Costa 60'; Hélder 74'; Cadete 89'	Report

Estádio da Luz, Lisbon
Attendance: 71,766
Referee: Piero Ceccarini (Italy)
15 November 1995
20:00 UTC+1

Northern Ireland	5–3	Austria
O'Neill 27', 78'; Dowie 32' (pen.); Hunter 53'; Gray 63'	Report	Schopp 55'; Stumpf 70'; Wetl 81'

Windsor Park, Belfast
Attendance: 8,451
Referee: Leif Sundell (Sweden)

== Goalscorers ==
There were 107 goals scored in 30 matches, for an average of 3.57 goals per match.

11 goals

- (Austria) Toni Polster

6 goals

- (Portugal) Domingos Paciência

5 goals

- (Latvia) Vīts Rimkus
- (Northern Ireland) Iain Dowie
- (Portugal) Paulo Alves
- (Republic of Ireland) John Aldridge

4 goals

- (Austria) Peter Stöger
- (Northern Ireland) Jimmy Quinn
- (Portugal) Rui Costa

3 goals

- (Latvia) Armands Zeiberliņš
- (Northern Ireland) Phil Gray
- (Northern Ireland) Michael O'Neill
- (Portugal) Luís Figo
- (Portugal) João Pinto
- (Republic of Ireland) Niall Quinn

2 goals

- (Austria) Andi Herzog
- (Austria) Adi Hütter
- (Portugal) Paulinho Santos
- (Republic of Ireland) Tommy Coyne
- (Republic of Ireland) John Sheridan

1 goal

- (Austria) Franz Aigner
- (Austria) Dietmar Kühbauer
- (Austria) Andreas Ogris
- (Austria) Heimo Pfeifenberger
- (Austria) Marcus Pürk
- (Austria) Dieter Ramusch
- (Austria) Herfried Sabitzer
- (Austria) Markus Schopp
- (Austria) Christian Stumpf
- (Austria) Arnold Wetl
- (Latvia) Vitālijs Astafjevs
- (Latvia) Vladimirs Babičevs
- (Latvia) Jevgeņijs Miļevskis
- (Liechtenstein) Daniel Hasler
- (Northern Ireland) Keith Gillespie
- (Northern Ireland) Michael Hughes
- (Northern Ireland) Barry Hunter
- (Northern Ireland) Steve Lomas
- (Northern Ireland) Gerry McMahon
- (Portugal) Jorge Cadete
- (Portugal) Fernando Couto
- (Portugal) António Folha
- (Portugal) Hélder
- (Portugal) Oceano
- (Portugal) Carlos Secretário
- (Republic of Ireland) Ray Houghton
- (Republic of Ireland) Roy Keane
- (Republic of Ireland) Paul McGrath
- (Republic of Ireland) Andy Townsend

1 own goal

- (Portugal) Vítor Baía (against Republic of Ireland)
