= Stade de l'Abbé-Deschamps =

Football stadium in Auxerre, France

Stade Abbé-Deschamps
- l'Abbé-Deschamps
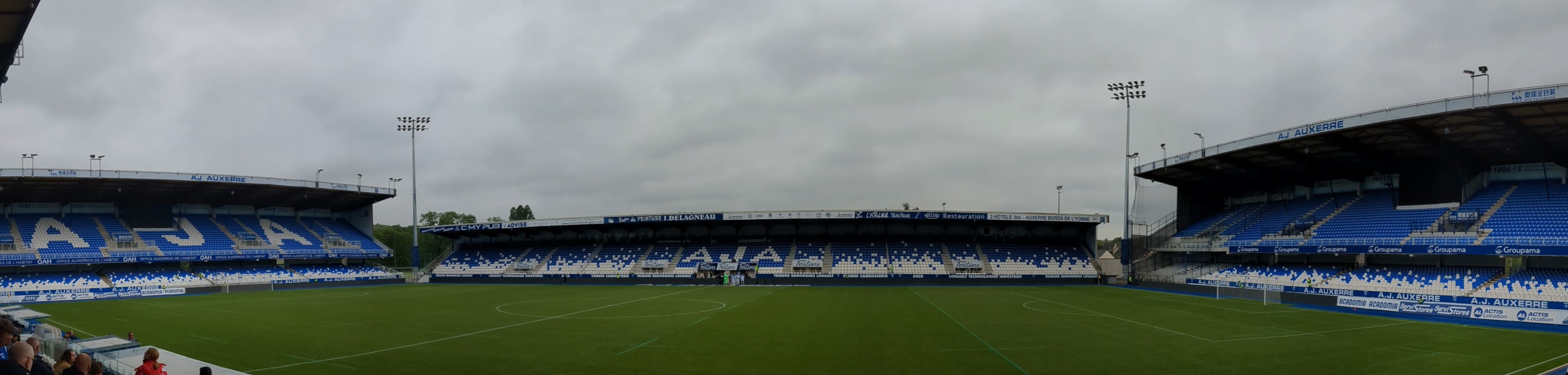
- Interactive map of Stade Abbé-Deschamps
- Full name: Stade Abbé-Deschamps
- Location: Route de Vaux, 89006, Auxerre, France
- Coordinates: 47°47′12.31″N 3°35′19.19″E
- Owner: AJ Auxerre
- Operator: AJ Auxerre
- Capacity: 17,897
- Surface: Grass
- Field size: 110 m × 60 m (360 ft × 200 ft)

Construction
- Opened: 13 October 1918
- Renovated: 1994

Tenant
- AJ Auxerre (1918–present)

The Stade Abbé-Deschamps (French pronunciation: [stad də labe deʃɑ̃]) is the home of AJ Auxerre football club in Auxerre, France. It has a capacity of 18,541. Renovated in 1994, it was renamed the Stade Abbé-Deschamps after the abbot Ernest-Théodore Valentin Deschamps, who founded the club in 1905.

== Events ==
=== Association football ===
Date	Competition	Home	Away	Score	Attendance
6 September 1995	UEFA Euro 1996 qualifying	France	Azerbaijan	10–0	13,479
6 June 2007	UEFA Euro 2008 qualifying	France	Georgia	1–0	19,345
23 July 2016	Friendly	France	Canada	1–0	17,589

== Gallery ==
Stadium map

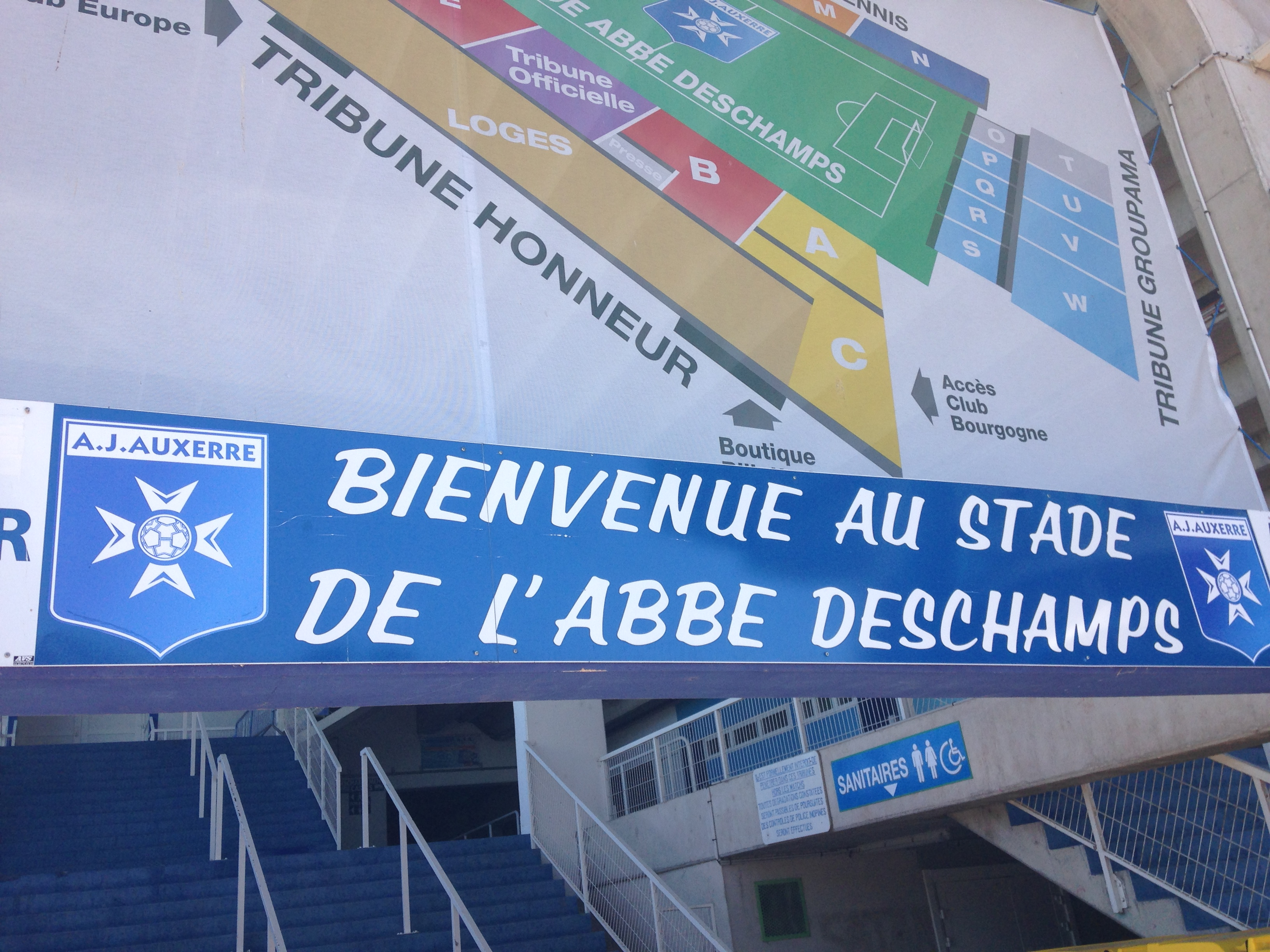
Stadium entry

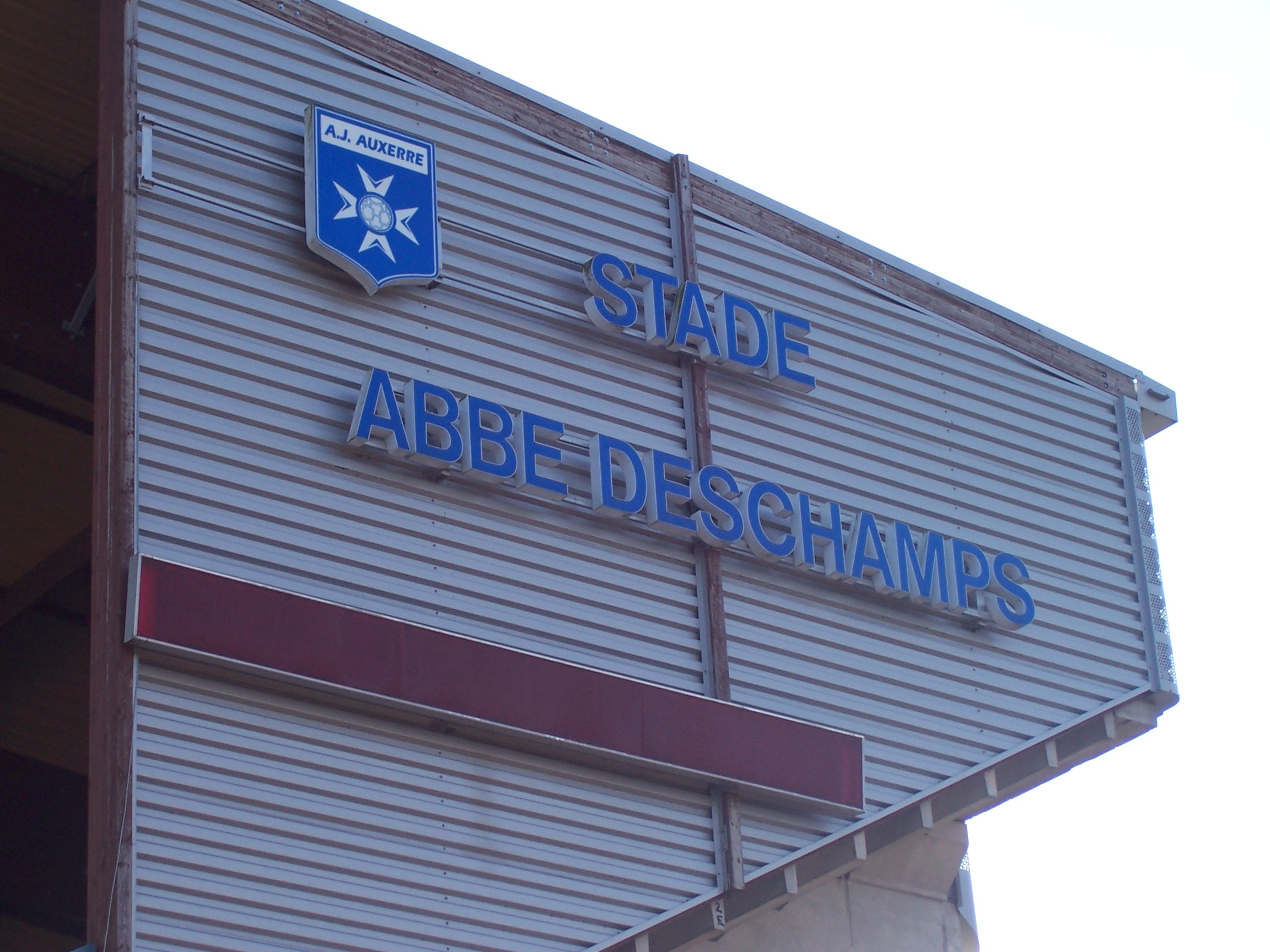
Stadium entry

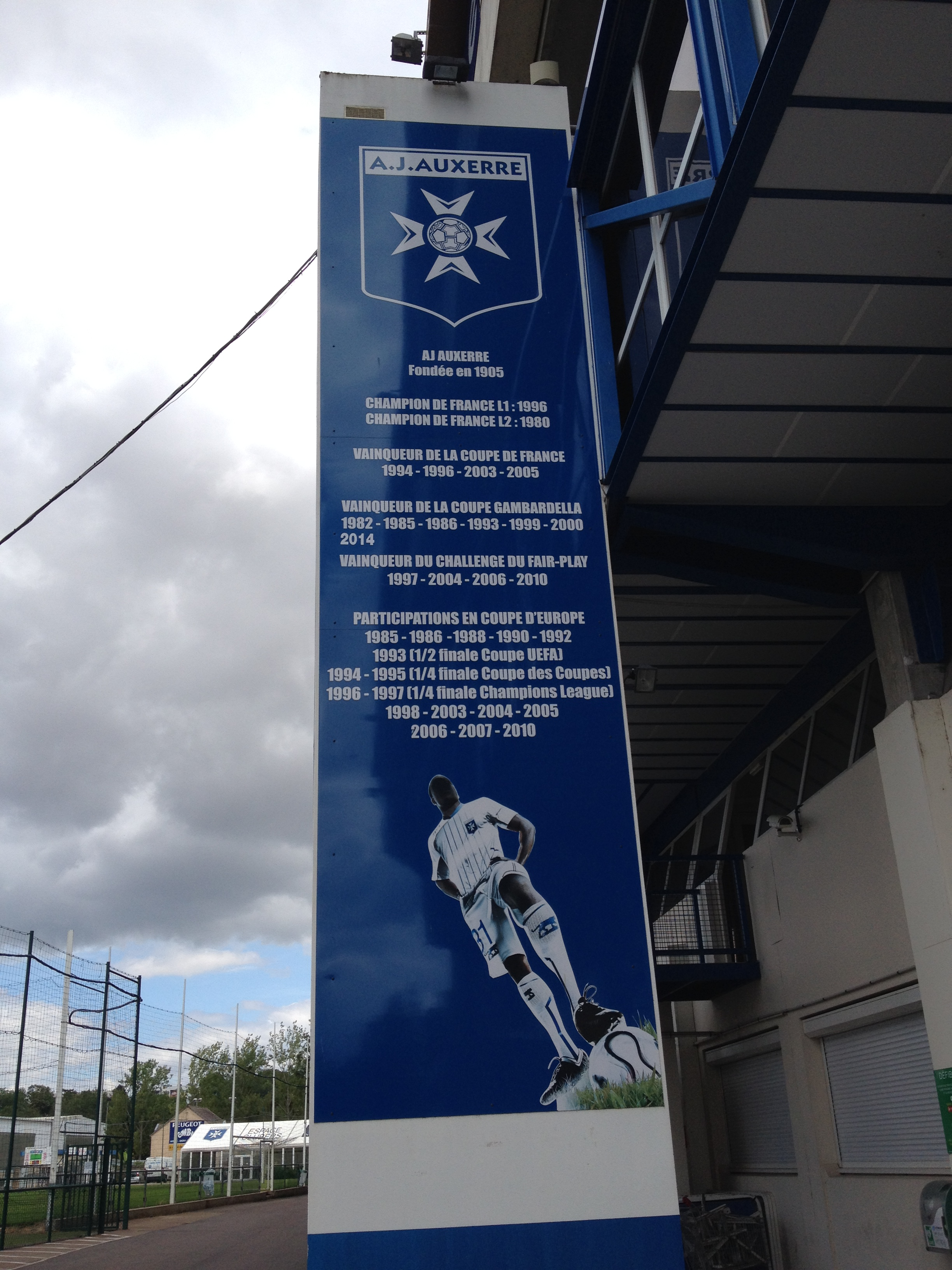
Exterior view of the stadium

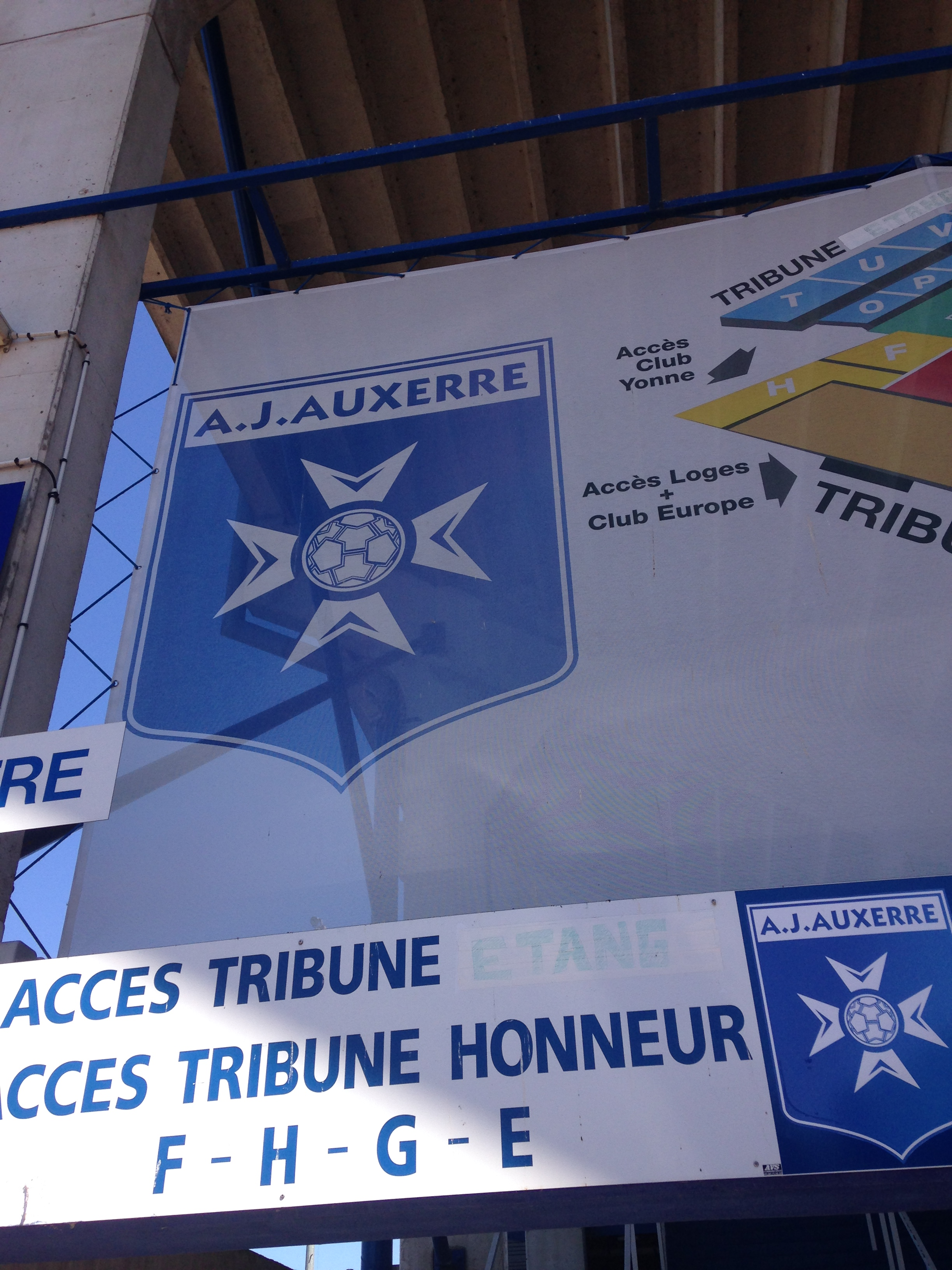
Exterior view of the stadium

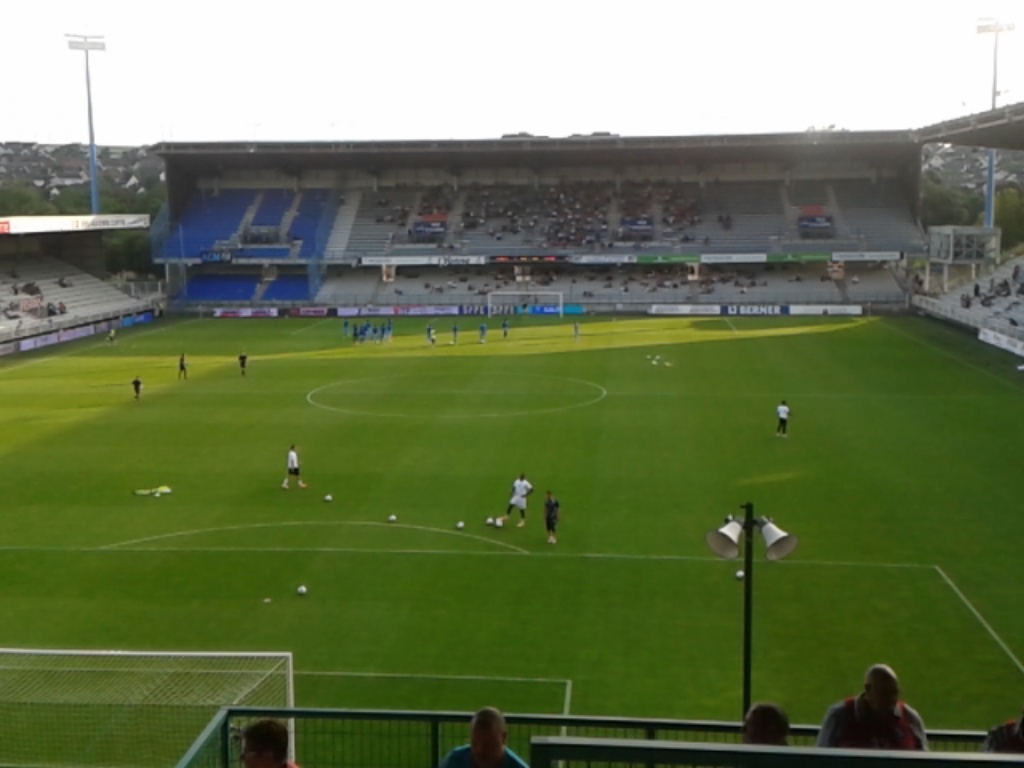
View of the stadium from Tribune Leclerc

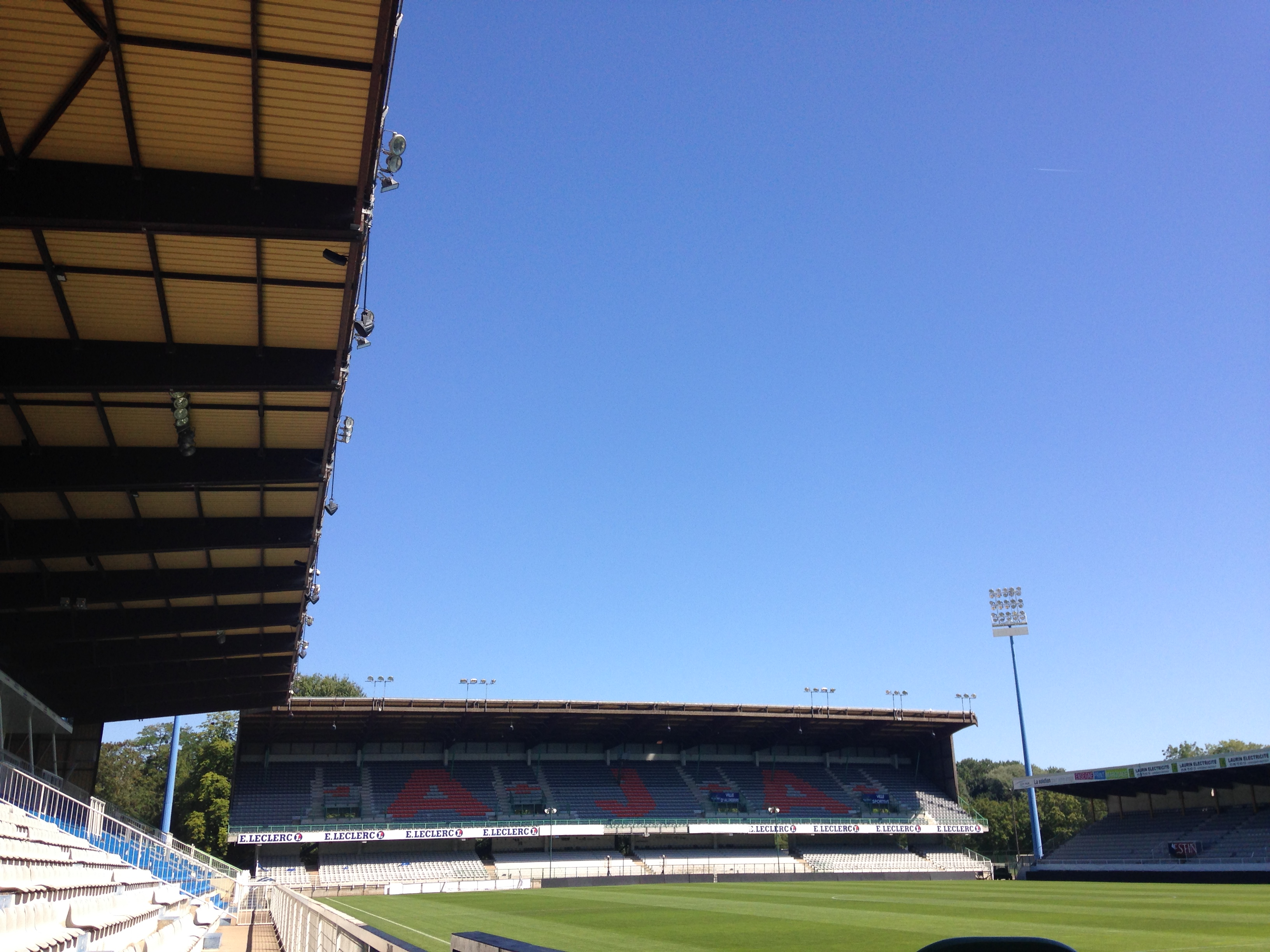
View of Tribune Leclerc from Tribune d'honneur

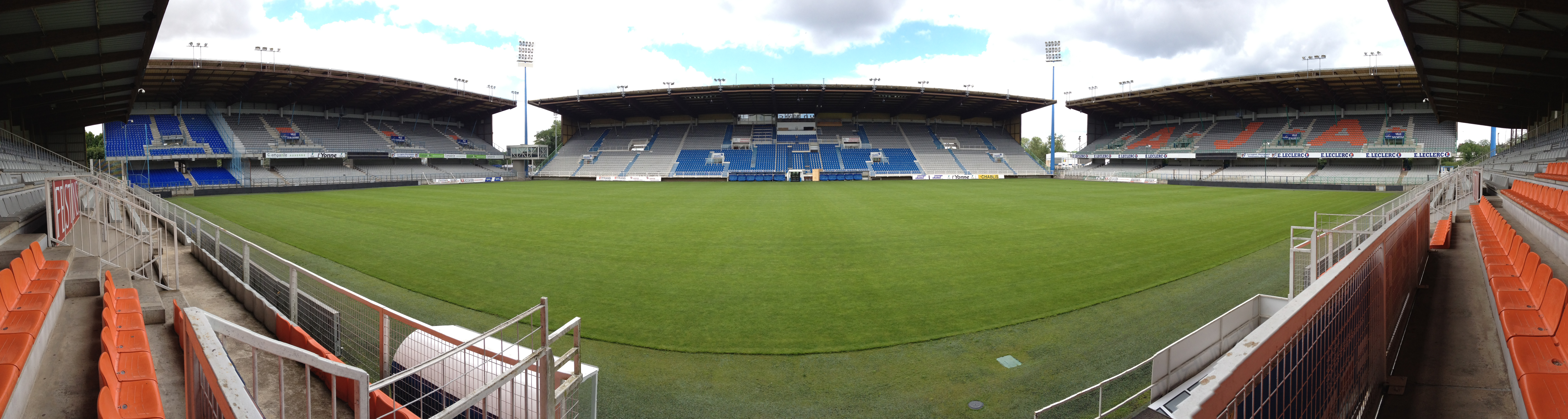
Stadium panorama

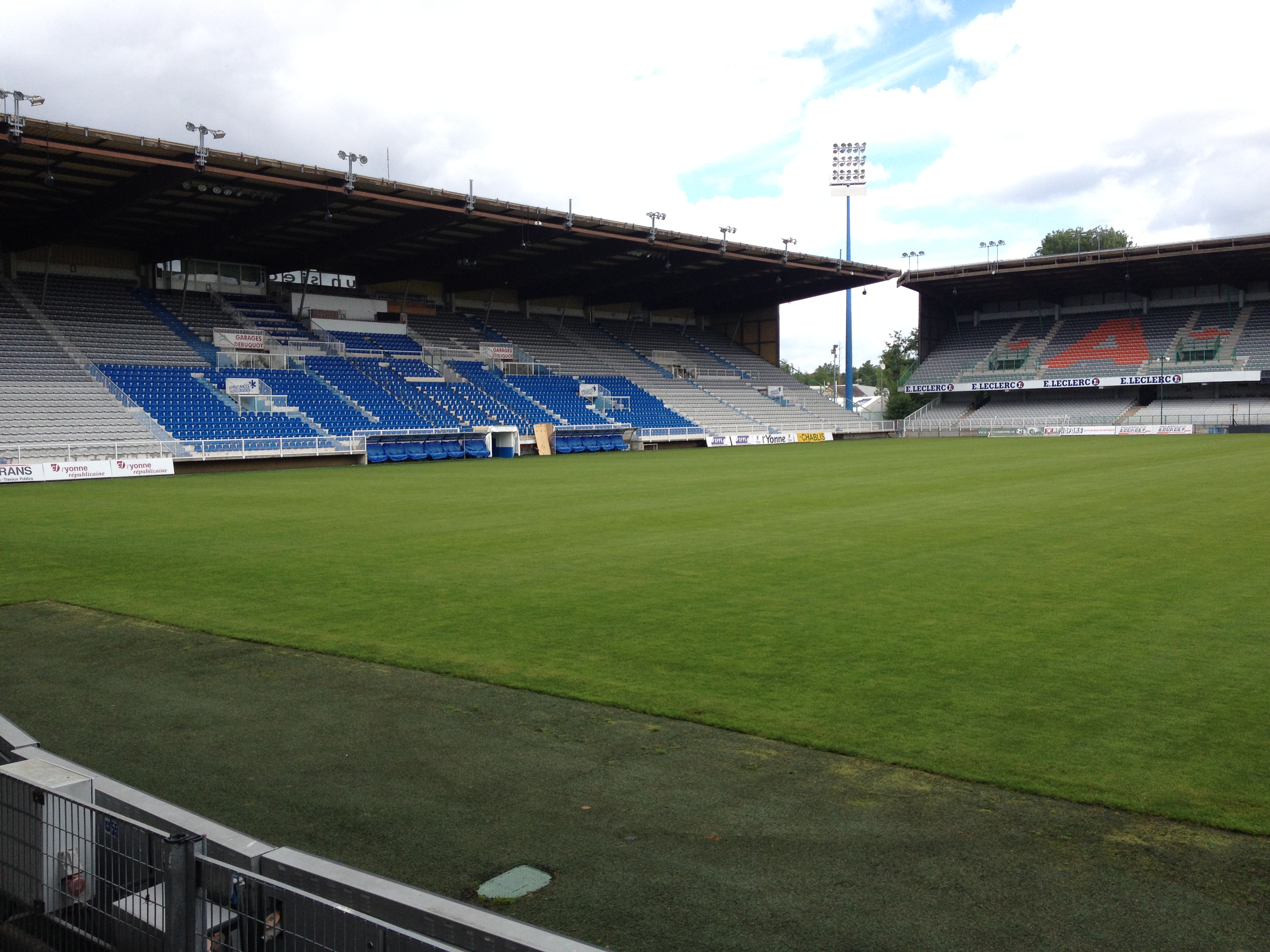
View of Tribune d'honneur

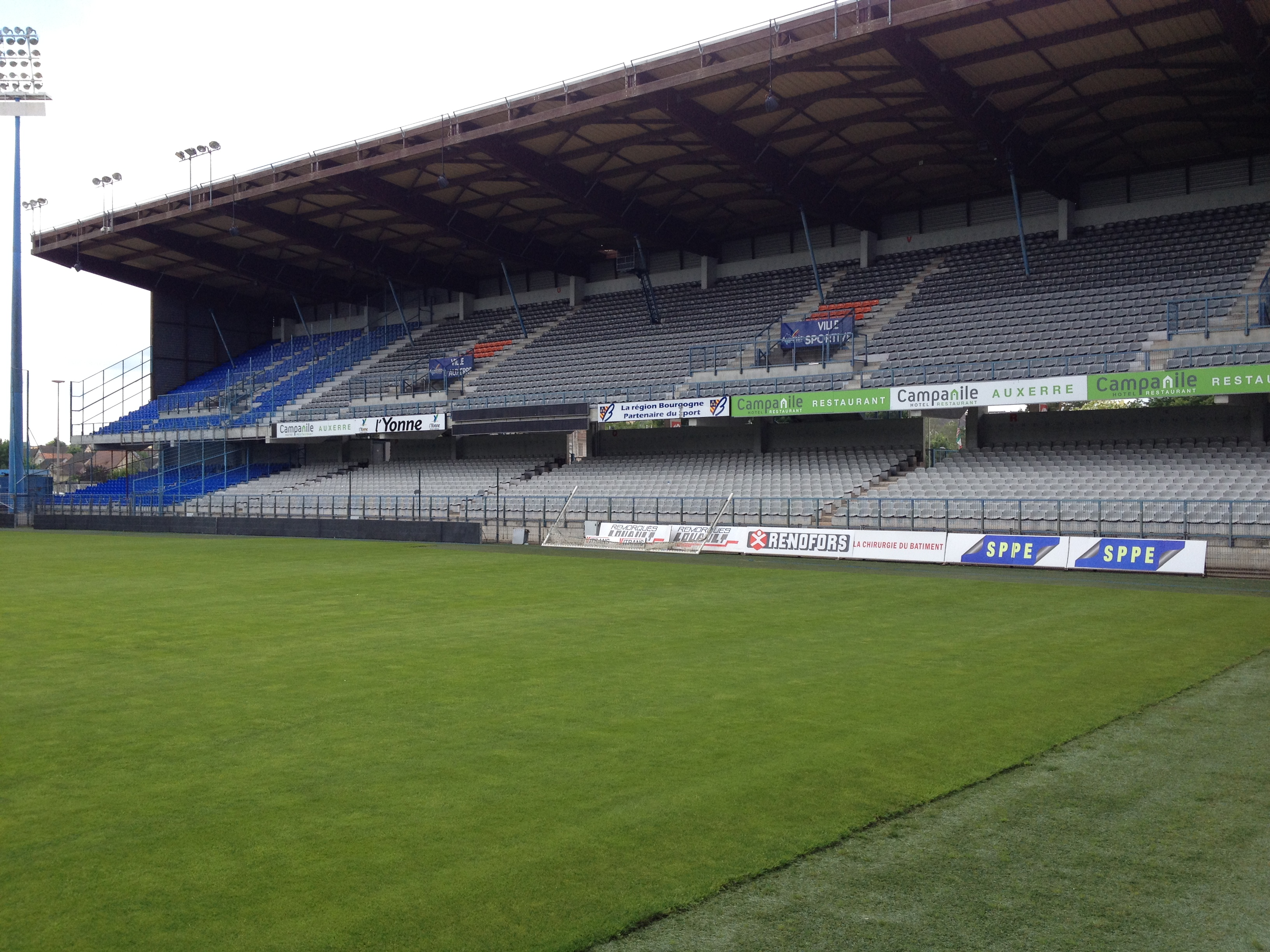
View of Tribune Vaux

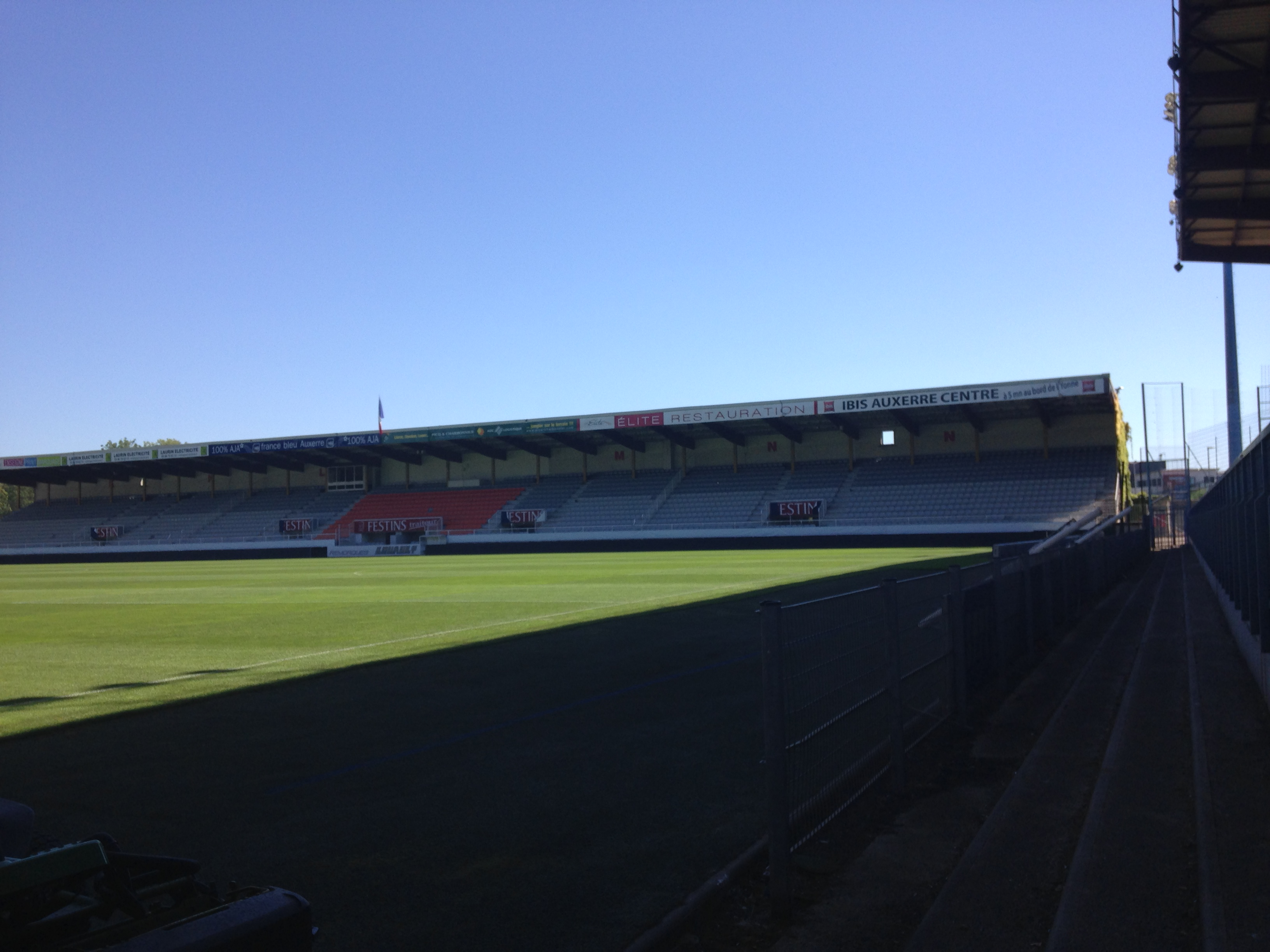
View of Tribunes côté tennis
