= UEFA Euro 1996 qualifying Group 3 =

Football tournament qualification stage

Qualifying Group 3 for the 1996 UEFA European Football Championship took place between 7 September 1994 and 15 November 1995 and consisted of Sweden, Switzerland, Hungary, Iceland and Turkey.

Both Switzerland and Turkey qualified for UEFA Euro 1996 after a 2–2 draw between Sweden and Turkey in the final match of the group. Switzerland qualified as group winners and Turkey as one of the six best runners-up.

== Background ==
UEFA Euro 1996 would be the first UEFA European Championship to feature 16 teams in the finals. Previous editions had only seen four or eight teams qualify.

Previously, Hungary had qualified for the UEFA European Championships on two occasions while Sweden had qualified once before as hosts in 1992 but neither Switzerland, Iceland nor Turkey had reached the finals.

== Format ==
The group was contested as a double round robin in which each team would play every other team twice – once at home and once away. The group winner would qualify for UEFA Euro 1996. Of the eight groups, the six best runners-up would also qualify. The remaining two runners-up would contest a play-off to determine the final qualifier.

== Summary ==
The group began on 7 September 1994 when Hungary and Turkey drew 2–2 and Sweden defeated Iceland 1–0. The following month, Turkey and Switzerland recorded wins against Iceland and Sweden respectively. In November, Sweden defeated Hungary 2–0 and Switzerland defeated Iceland 1–0. In the final match of 1994, Switzerland won 2–1 away against Turkey. That left Switzerland top of the standings with nine points from their opening three matches ahead of Sweden on six and Turkey on four.

In March 1995, Turkey defeated 10-man Sweden 2–1 and Hungary drew 2–2 with Switzerland. The following month, Turkey strengthened their case for a place at the finals with a 2–1 win away to Switzerland and Hungary defeated Sweden 1–0. In June, Sweden drew with Iceland before Iceland won 2–1 at home to Hungary. As a result, Turkey and Switzerland were top of the standings with 10 ponts, three ahead of Sweden who had played a game more.

Switzerland then defeated Iceland 1–0 in August. The following month, Switzerland drew goalless with Sweden and Turkey defeated Hungary 2–0. Those results eliminated Sweden and Hungary, leaving Switzerland and Turkey to fight for first place. In October, Switzerland defeated Hungary 3–0 in what was their final match and Iceland drew goalless with Turkey. As a result, Switzerland were three points clear but Turkey could still catch them with their game in hand. In the final round of matches in November, Hungary defeated Iceland 1–0 before Turkey missed the chance to win the group after drawing 2–2 with Sweden. Switzerland therefore qualified as group winners while Turkey's draw was ultimately enough to secure them one of the six best runners-up places.

== Standings ==
Pos	Team	Pld	W	D	L	GF	GA	GD	Pts	Qualification	(Switzerland)	(Turkey)	(Sweden)	(Hungary)	(Iceland)
1	Switzerland	8	5	2	1	15	7	+8	17	Qualify for final tournament	—	1–2	4–2	3–0	1–0
2	Turkey	8	4	3	1	16	8	+8	15	Qualify for final tournament	1–2	—	2–1	2–0	5–0
3	Sweden	8	2	3	3	9	10	−1	9		0–0	2–2	—	2–0	1–1
4	Hungary	8	2	2	4	7	13	−6	8		2–2	2–2	1–0	—	1–0
5	Iceland	8	1	2	5	3	12	−9	5		0–2	0–0	0–1	2–1	—

Rules for classification: Qualification tiebreakers

== Results ==
7 September 1994
20:00 UTC

Iceland	0–1	Sweden
		Ingesson 36'

Laugardalsvöllur, Reykjavík
Attendance: 14,361
Referee: Leslie Mottram (Scotland)
7 September 1994
20:00 UTC+2

Hungary	2–2	Turkey
Kiprich 4'; Halmai 43'		Şükür 67'; Bülent 72'

Népstadion, Budapest
Attendance: 20,000
Referee: Pierluigi Pairetto (Italy)

12 October 1994
20:00 UTC+2

Turkey	5–0	Iceland
Saffet 11', 26'; Şükür 29', 61'; Sergen 66'

Ali Sami Yen Stadium, Istanbul
Attendance: 11,280
Referee: Nikolai Levnikov (Russia)
12 October 1994
20:00 UTC+1

Switzerland	4–2	Sweden
Ohrel 36'; Blomqvist 64' (o.g.); Sforza 80'; Türkyilmaz 82'		K. Andersson 6'; Dahlin 61'

Wankdorf Stadium, Bern
Attendance: 24,000
Referee: David Elleray (England)

16 November 1994
19:00 UTC+1

Sweden	2–0	Hungary
Brolin 43'; Dahlin 70'

Råsunda Stadium, Stockholm
Attendance: 27,571
Referee: Mario van der Ende (Netherlands)
16 November 1994
20:00 UTC+1

Switzerland	1–0	Iceland
Bickel 44'

Stade Olympique de la Pontaise, Lausanne
Attendance: 15,800
Referee: Patrick Kelly (Ireland)

14 December 1994
20:00 UTC+2

Turkey	1–2	Switzerland
Recep 39'		Koller 7'; Bickel 16'

Ali Sami Yen Stadium, Istanbul
Attendance: 22,516
Referee: Ion Crăciunescu (Romania)

29 March 1995
20:15 UTC+2

Hungary	2–2	Switzerland
Kiprich 50'; Illés 72'		Subiat 74', 84'

Népstadion, Budapest
Attendance: 13,000
Referee: Alfred Wieser (Austria)
29 March 1995
20:30 UTC+3

Turkey	2–1	Sweden
Ertuğrul 64'; Sergen 75'		K. Andersson 23' (pen.)

BJK İnönü Stadium, Istanbul
Attendance: 12,526
Referee: Alfredo Trentalange (Italy)

26 April 1995
20:05 UTC+2

Hungary	1–0	Sweden
Halmai 2'

Népstadion, Budapest
Attendance: 8,300
Referee: Antonio Jesús Lõpez Nieto (Spain)
26 April 1995
20:00 UTC+2

Switzerland	1–2	Turkey
Hottiger 38'		Şükür 17'; Ogün 56'

Wankdorf Stadium, Bern
Attendance: 24,000
Referee: Frans van den Wijngaert (Belgium)

1 June 1995
19:00 UTC+2

Sweden	1–1	Iceland
Brolin 16' (pen.)		A.Gunnlaugsson 3'

Råsunda Stadium, Stockholm
Attendance: 25,676
Referee: Atanas Uzunov (Bulgaria)

11 June 1995
20:00 UTC

Iceland	2–1	Hungary
Bergsson 61'; S. Jónsson 66'		Vincze 20'

Laugardalsvöllur, Reykjavík
Attendance: 4,474
Referee: Alain Sars (France)

16 August 1995
21:00 UTC

Iceland	0–2	Switzerland
		Knup 4'; Türkyilmaz 18'

Laugardalsvöllur, Reykjavík
Attendance: 8,387
Referee: Ryszard Wójcik (Poland)

6 September 1995
19:00 UTC+2

Sweden	0–0	Switzerland

Ullevi, Gothenburg
Attendance: 40,505
Referee: Piero Ceccarini (Italy)
6 September 1995
20:00 UTC+3

Turkey	2–0	Hungary
Şükür 9', 31'

BJK İnönü Stadium, Istanbul
Attendance: 25,358
Referee: Václav Krondl (Czech Republic)

11 October 1995
20:30 UTC+1

Switzerland	3–0	Hungary
Türkyilmaz 22'; Sforza 56'; Ohrel 90'

Hardturm, Zürich
Attendance: 21,000
Referee: Charles Agius (Malta)
11 October 1995
21:00 UTC

Iceland	0–0	Turkey

Laugardalsvöllur, Reykjavík
Attendance: 2,308
Referee: Hartmut Strampe (Germany)

11 November 1995
17:00 UTC+1

Hungary	1–0	Iceland
Illés 56'

Stadion Rudolf Illovszky, Budapest
Attendance: 1,120
Referee: Georgios Bikas (Greece)

15 November 1995
19:00 UTC+1

Sweden	2–2	Turkey
Alexandersson 24'; Pettersson 53'		Şükür 62'; Emre 72'

Råsunda Stadium, Stockholm
Attendance: 16,238
Referee: Ryszard Wójcik (Poland)

== Goalscorers ==
There were 50 goals scored in 20 matches, for an average of 2.5 goals per match.

7 goals

- (Turkey national football team) Hakan Şükür

3 goals

- (Switzerland national football team) Kubilay Türkyilmaz

2 goals

- (Hungary national football team) Gábor Halmai
- (Hungary national football team) Béla Illés
- (Hungary national football team) József Kiprich
- (Sweden men's national football team) Kennet Andersson
- (Sweden men's national football team) Tomas Brolin
- (Sweden men's national football team) Martin Dahlin
- (Switzerland national football team) Thomas Bickel
- (Switzerland national football team) Christophe Ohrel
- (Switzerland national football team) Ciriaco Sforza
- (Switzerland national football team) Nestor Subiat
- (Turkey national football team) Saffet Sancaklı
- (Turkey national football team) Sergen Yalçın

1 goal

- (Hungary national football team) István Vincze
- (Iceland national football team) Guðni Bergsson
- (Iceland national football team) Arnar Gunnlaugsson
- (Iceland national football team) Sigurður Jónsson
- (Sweden men's national football team) Niclas Alexandersson
- (Sweden men's national football team) Klas Ingesson
- (Sweden men's national football team) Jörgen Pettersson
- (Switzerland national football team) Marc Hottiger
- (Switzerland national football team) Adrian Knup
- (Switzerland national football team) Marcel Koller
- (Turkey national football team) Emre Aşık
- (Turkey national football team) Recep Çetin
- (Turkey national football team) Bülent Korkmaz
- (Turkey national football team) Ertuğrul Sağlam
- (Turkey national football team) Ogün Temizkanoğlu

1 own goal

- (Sweden men's national football team) Jesper Blomqvist (against Switzerland)
