= Sabitzer =

Sabitzer is a surname. Notable people with the surname include:

- Herfried Sabitzer (born 1969), Austrian footballer
- Marcel Sabitzer (born 1994), Austrian footballer, son of Herfried
- Thomas Sabitzer (born 2000), Austrian footballer, nephew of Herfried
