= UEFA Euro 1996 qualifying play-off =

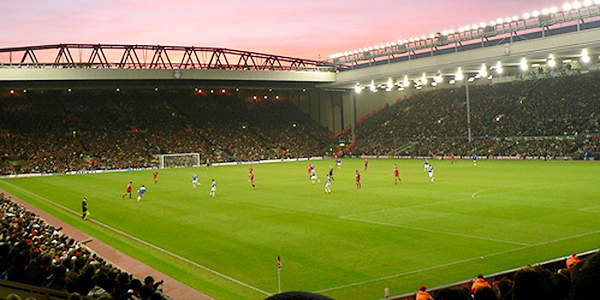
- Anfield in Liverpool hosted the play-off
- Event: UEFA Euro 1996 qualifying
Republic of Ireland	Netherlands
0	2
- Netherlands qualified for UEFA Euro 1996
- Date: 13 December 1995
- Venue: Anfield, Liverpool (England)
- Referee: Vadim Zhuk (Belarus)
- Attendance: 40,050

The UEFA Euro 1996 qualifying play-off was a UEFA Euro 1996 qualifying match to decide the final participant for UEFA Euro 1996. It was played on 13 December 1995 at Anfield in Liverpool, England, a neutral venue, between the Republic of Ireland and the Netherlands. The Netherlands won 2–0, therefore qualifying for the 1996 European Championship.

== Background ==
The UEFA Euro 1996 qualifying group stage consisted of eight groups with five or six countries in each group. Each group winner qualified directly for Euro 1996 in England, and the eight group runners-up were compared in a separate table. The top six countries qualify automatically for Euro 1996 while the bottom two countries would face each other in a one-off match playoff to determine the sixteenth and last team that would participate in the next summer's European Championship.

=== Netherlands (Group 5) ===
After the 1994 FIFA World Cup the Netherlands started the qualifying campaign for Euro 1996 under coach Dick Advocaat. In December, Advocaat moved to PSV Eindhoven, where he succeeded Kees Rijvers as head coach. In January 1995 48-year-old Guus Hiddink took charge of the national team. Under the new coach, the Netherlands finished second in Group 5, 1 point behind the Czech Republic, and tied at 20 points with Norway. The Netherlands had the better head-to-head against Norway, thus putting the Dutch in second place.

Pos	Team	Pld	W	D	L	GF	GA	GD	Pts	Qualification
1	Czech Republic	10	6	3	1	21	6	+15	21	Qualify for final tournament
2	Netherlands	10	6	2	2	23	5	+18	20 (Note: Head-to-head points: Netherlands 4, Norway 1.)	Advance to play-off
3	Norway	10	6	2	2	17	7	+10	20	
4	Belarus	10	3	2	5	8	13	−5	11	
5	Luxembourg	10	3	1	6	3	21	−18	10	
6	Malta	10	0	2	8	2	22	−20	2	

Source: UEFA
Rules for classification: Qualification tiebreakers

=== Republic of Ireland (Group 6) ===
The Republic of Ireland had a strong start to their group, when they won their opening three games, including a 4–0 win against Northern Ireland. The Republic's next game was also against Northern Ireland, although the result was a 1–1 draw. From that point onwards the Republic stuttered badly as injuries struck down key players such as Roy Keane, Andy Townsend, John Sheridan, and Steve Staunton. After beating the highly fancied Portugal, the Irish then endured an embarrassing 0–0 draw to Liechtenstein (this was Liechtenstein's only point in their ten matches), before losing twice to Austria, on both occasions by three goals to one. Although they defeated Latvia, Ireland needed to beat Portugal in Lisbon to qualify outright but lost 3–0. The Republic of Ireland therefore finished second in Group 6, 6 points behind Portugal, and tied at 17 points with Northern Ireland. The Republic of Ireland had the better head-to-head against Northern Ireland, thus putting the Republic of Ireland in second place.

Pos	Team	Pld	W	D	L	GF	GA	GD	Pts	Qualification
1	Portugal	10	7	2	1	29	7	+22	23	Qualify for final tournament
2	Republic of Ireland	10	5	2	3	17	11	+6	17 (Note: Head-to-head points: Republic of Ireland 4, Northern Ireland 1.)	Advance to play-off
3	Northern Ireland	10	5	2	3	20	15	+5	17	
4	Austria	10	5	1	4	29	14	+15	16	
5	Latvia	10	4	0	6	11	20	−9	12	
6	Liechtenstein	10	0	1	9	1	40	−39	1	

Source: UEFA
Rules for classification: Qualification tiebreakers

=== Ranking of second-placed teams ===
The runners-up of each of the eight groups were placed in a table to decide which seven of them would qualify. The best six runners-up qualified directly, while the two worst competed in a play-off on a neutral ground to determine the final qualifier. As one group had five teams and the others had six, results against fifth and sixth-placed teams were not factored in. The Netherlands finished seventh in the table, while the Republic of Ireland finished eighth and last, therefore qualifying both countries to the play-off.

Pos	Grp	Team	Pld	W	D	L	GF	GA	GD	Pts	Qualification
1	4	Italy	6	4	1	1	12	4	+8	13	Qualify for final tournament
2	7	Bulgaria	6	4	0	2	14	8	+6	12	Qualify for final tournament
3	3	Turkey	6	3	2	1	11	8	+3	11	Qualify for final tournament
4	8	Scotland	6	3	2	1	5	2	+3	11	Qualify for final tournament
5	2	Denmark	6	3	2	1	9	7	+2	11	Qualify for final tournament
6	1	France	6	2	4	0	8	2	+6	10	Qualify for final tournament
7	5	Netherlands	6	2	2	2	6	5	+1	8	Advance to play-off
8	6	Republic of Ireland	6	2	1	3	8	10	−2	7	Advance to play-off

Source: RSSSF
Rules for classification: Counting only matches against teams ranked first to fourth in the group, 1) Points; 2) Goal difference; 3) Goals scored; 4) Away goals scored; 5) Drawing of lots.

== Summary ==
Team 1	Score	Team 2
Republic of Ireland	0–2	Netherlands

== Match ==
=== Summary ===
Dutch forward Patrick Kluivert opened the scoring with a low shot to the right corner after 29 minutes to put the Netherlands ahead. Kluivert then wrapped the match up with his second goal, lifting the ball over the advancing Alan Kelly with two minutes to go, giving the Netherlands a 2–0 win and sending them through to Euro 1996.

=== Details ===
13 December 1995
20:00 GMT

Republic of Ireland	0–2	Netherlands
	Report	Kluivert 30', 89'

Anfield, Liverpool (England)
Attendance: 40,050
Referee: Vadim Zhuk (Belarus)

Republic of Ireland	Netherlands

GK	1	Alan Kelly
RB	2	Gary Kelly
CB	5	Paul McGrath
CB	4	Phil Babb
LB	3	Denis Irwin
RM	6	Jeff Kenna
CM	7	Andy Townsend (c)		(substituted off) 51'
CM	10	John Sheridan
LM	11	Terry Phelan
CF	8	John Aldridge		(substituted off) 72'
CF	9	Tony Cascarino
Substitutions:
MF	14	Jason McAteer		(substituted on) 51'
DF	15	Alan Kernaghan	(yellow card) 85'	(substituted on) 72'
Manager:
(England) Jack Charlton

GK	1	Edwin van der Sar
RB	2	Michael Reiziger
CB	3	Danny Blind (c)	(yellow card) 79'
CB	4	Clarence Seedorf
LB	5	Winston Bogarde
CM	6	Ronald de Boer
CM	8	Edgar Davids
AM	10	Dennis Bergkamp		(substituted off) 58'
RF	7	Marc Overmars
CF	9	Patrick Kluivert
LF	11	Glenn Helder		(substituted off) 79'
Substitutions:
DF	13	Johan de Kock		(substituted on) 58'
MF	12	Aron Winter		(substituted on) 79'
Manager:
Guus Hiddink

Match rules

- 90 minutes.
- 30 minutes of golden goal extra time if necessary.
- Penalty shoot-out if scores still level.
- Maximum of three substitutions.

== Goalscorers ==
There were 2 goals scored in 1 match, for an average of 2 goals per match.

2 goals

- (Netherlands) Patrick Kluivert

== Aftermath ==
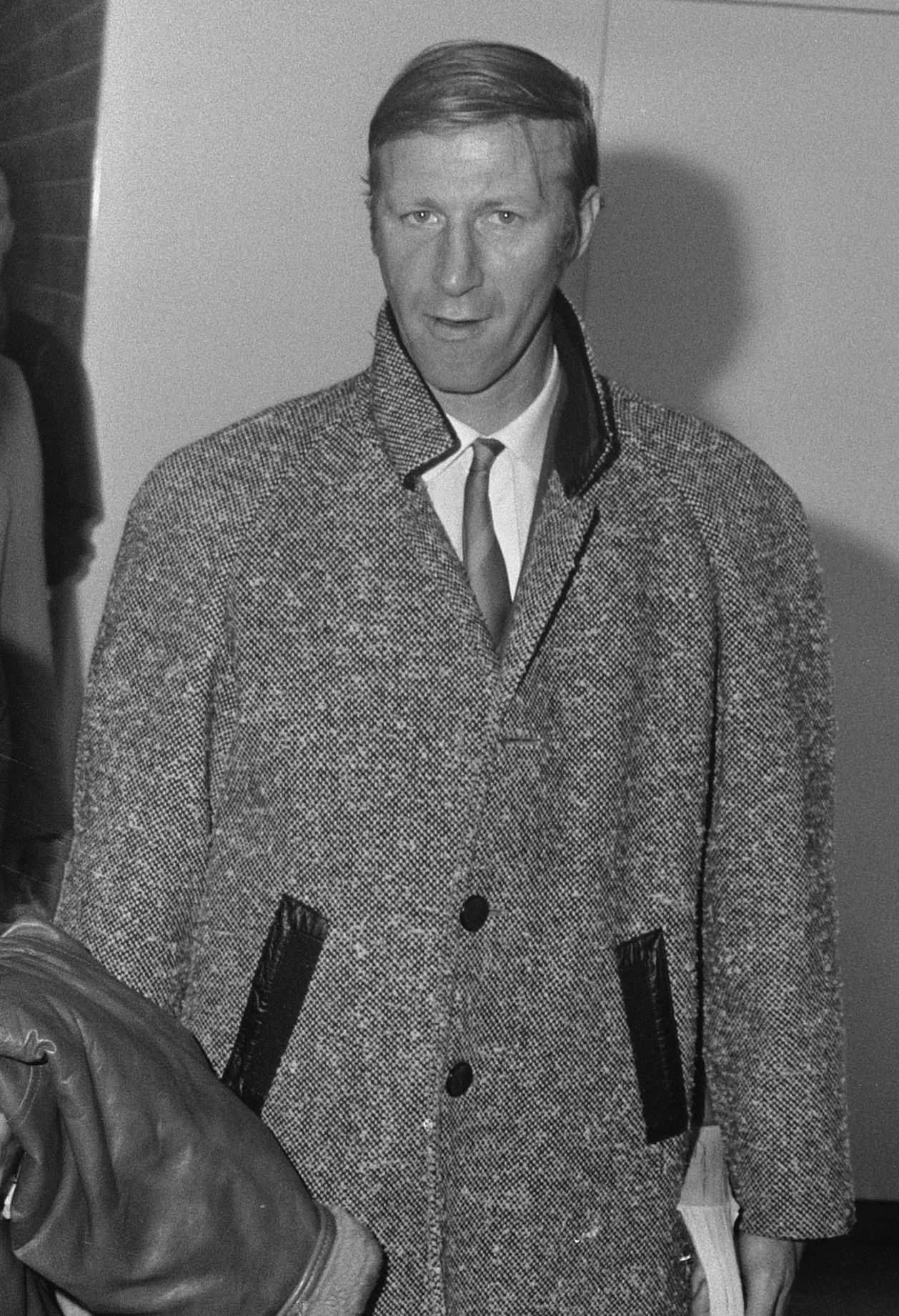
This was Jack Charlton's final match as coach of the Republic of Ireland, as he resigned after the match.

After failing to qualify for the European Championship, Republic of Ireland manager Jack Charlton resigned shortly after the game. Charlton bid Irish fans an emotional farewell after ten memorable years in charge which saw him help Ireland qualify for their first ever European Championship in 1988 and their first and second ever World Cups in 1990 and 1994.

"In my heart of hearts, I knew I'd wrung as much as I could out of the squad I'd got – that some of my older players had given me all they had to give."

— Charlton speaking in his autobiography on his decision to retire.

The Netherlands advanced on to Euro 1996, where they finished second in Group A behind hosts England, thus qualifying them for the knockout stage. In the quarter-finals, they drew 0–0 after extra time to France, before losing 4–5 on penalties, as Clarence Seedorf missed his spot kick (that match was also played at Anfield).
