= Recep Çetin =

Turkish footballer

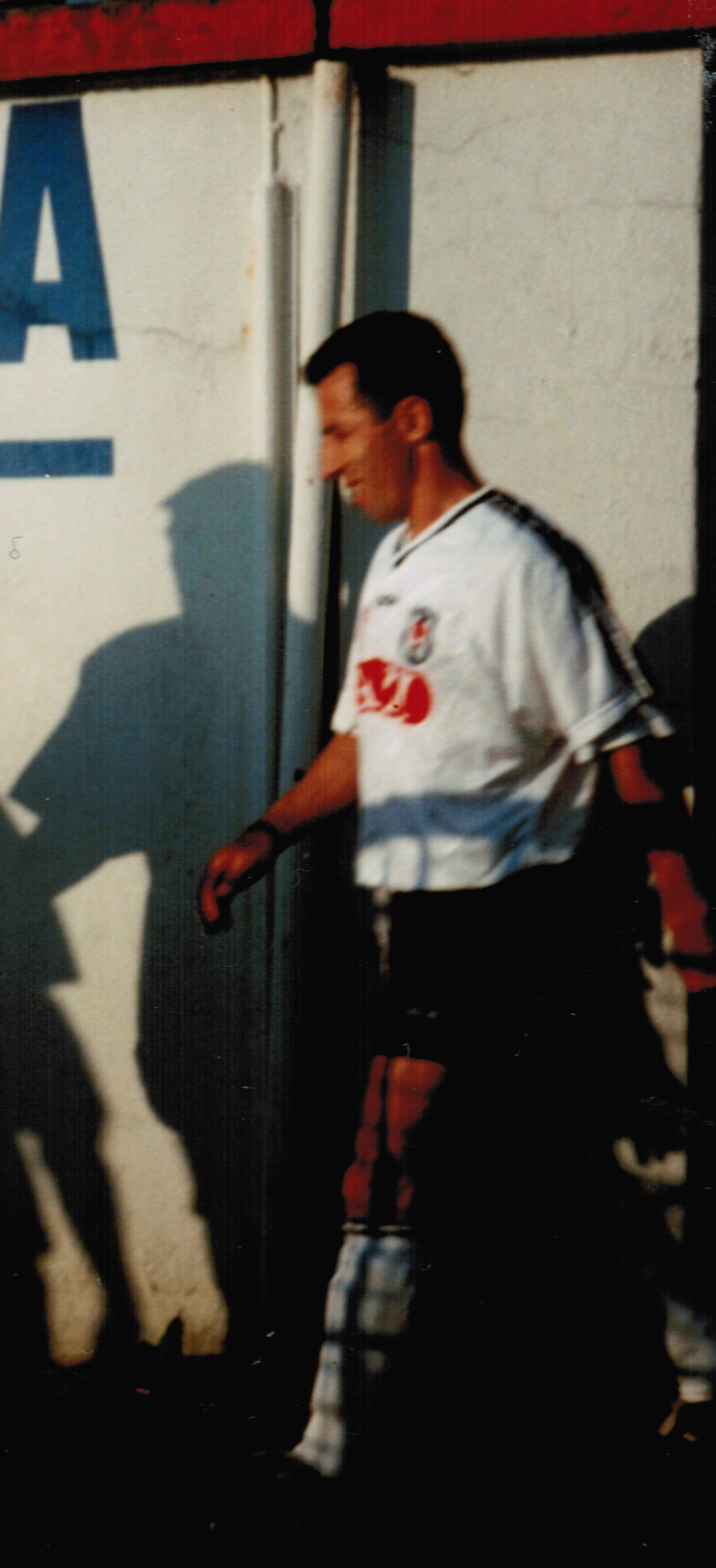
- Çetin in 1995

Personal information
- Date of birth: 1 October 1965 (age 61)
- Place of birth: Sakarya, Turkey
- Height: 1.70 m (5 ft 7 in)
- Position: Right back

Youth career
- 1979–1984: Sakaryaspor

Senior career*
Years	Team	Apps	(Gls)
1984–1988	Boluspor	127	(6)
1988–1998	Beşiktaş	261	(4)
1998–1999	Trabzonspor	29	(0)
1999–2001	İstanbulspor	44	(1)

International career
1984	Turkey U18	1	(0)
1986–1987	Turkey U21	5	(1)
1998	Turkey U23	7	(0)
1988–1997	Turkey	58	(1)
- * Club domestic league appearances and goals

Recep Çetin (born 1 October 1965) is a Turkish former footballer whose career as a defender lasted from 1979 to 2002.

== Career ==
A native of the town of Karasu in the Marmara region's Sakarya Province, Recep Çetin began his football career in 1979 at the age of 14 as a youth trainee in the Sakaryaspor football club, where he remained upon turning professional at 19 in 1984. He joined Boluspor in 1984. He was upset due to his team being relegated to the second level after placing last in the table in the 1984–85 season. However, he won Second League championship at Group B and returned to top level in 1985-86 season. Transferring to Beşiktaş J.K. in 1988, he was selected to play for the Turkey national football team 56 times and played 10 seasons in Beşiktaş. He won 4 league titles, 3 Turkish Cups, 4 President's Cups, 2 Prime Minister's Cups and 5 TSYD Cup championships. Upon leaving Beşiktaş he transferred to Trabzonspor in 1998 and then to İstanbulspor in 1999, ultimately retiring in 2001.

Known for his versatile playing style, defensive strength, and charismatic looks, Çetin was nicknamed "Takoz Recep" and even today has a cult following.

== Career statistics ==
=== International goals ===
#	Date	Venue	Opponent	Score	Result	Competition
1.	14 December 1994	Ali Sami Yen Stadium, Istanbul, Turkey	Switzerland	1–2	Lost	UEFA Euro 1996 qualifying
Correct as of 13 January 2013

== Individual ==
- Beşiktaş J.K. Squads of Century (Silver Team)
