= David Carabott =

Maltese footballer

Personal information
- Date of birth: 18 May 1968 (age 58)
- Place of birth: Melbourne, Australia
- Positions: Defender; midfielder

Youth career
- Birżebbuġa Windmills

Senior career*
Years	Team	Apps	(Gls)
1983–1987	Marsaxlokk	47	(15)
1987–2000	Hibernians	223	(59)
2000–2003	Valletta	63	(6)
2003–2005	Marsaxlokk	26	(3)
2005	→ Għajnsielem (loan)		
2005–2006	Msida St. Joseph	10	(1)
2006–2007	Sliema Wanderers	28	(0)
2007–2008	Għajnsielem		
2009–2010	Balzan Youths		
2010–2011	Marsaxlokk	1	(0)

International career^{‡}
- Malta U21
1987–2005	Malta	122	(12)

Managerial career
- 2009–2010: Balzan Youths (coach)
- 2010–2011: Marsaxlokk (coach)
- 2012–2013: Żurrieq
- 2014–: Marsa(Manager)
- * Club domestic league appearances and goals as of 9 February 2010 ‡ National team caps and goals as of 9 February 2010

David Carabott (born 18 May 1968) is a former professional footballer who played for as a defender or midfielder. Born in Australia, he was capped 122 times for the Malta national team, making him second most capped player in Maltese football history.

== Club career ==
Carabott was born on 18 May 1968 in Melbourne, Australia, and his family moved to Malta at an early age. He joined local club Marsaxlokk in 1979 and made his first team debut in the Third Division match against Mellieħa in the 1981–82 season. He slowly became a regular fixture with the team, and in 1987 he joined Premier League side Hibernians. In 1993, with the arrival of new coach Brian Talbot, Hibernians soon transformed to a title-challenging side, winning two league titles in the 1993–94 and 1994–95 season. Carabott during this time established himself as one of the best wing-backs in the game.

== International career ==
Carabott made his first appearance for the Maltese senior team on 15 November 1987, a 1–1 draw against Switzerland. A year later, on 23 November 1988, he scored his first international goal, the opener in a 1–1 draw against Cyprus. In total he played 122 times for the national team and with 12 goals, Carabott was at one point one of the highest scorers. One of these was a goal in a friendly against England, played on 3 June 2000, which temporarily equalised the game, although England went on to score the winner later on. Carabott also had a chance to score a second equaliser late on when Malta were awarded another penalty, but this effort was saved by Richard Wright.

== Statistics ==
=== International ===
Malta national team
Year	Apps	Goals
1987	3	0
1988	11 (Note: Includes matches against East Germany (played on 13 February 1988) and Belarus (played on 18 February 2004) which are considered as full international A matches by the Malta Football Association.)	1
1989	13	1
1990	8	0
1991	1	0
1992	1	0
1993	3	0
1994	7	0
1995	7	1
1996	10	0
1997	7	0
1998	8	0
1999	10	4
2000	9	2
2001	8	2 (Note: Carabott's goal in the 2–1 defeat against England, played on 3 June 2000, is credited by some sources as an own goal from Richard Wright, however RSSSF and the Malta Football Association credit it to Carabott.)
2002	7	0
2003	7	1
2004	1	0
2005	1	0
Total	122	12

=== International goals ===
"Score" represents the score in the match after Carabott's goal.

No.	Date	Venue	Opponent	Score	Result	Competition
1	23 November 1988	National Stadium, Ta' Qali, Ta' Qali, Malta	Cyprus	1–0	1–1	Friendly
2	11 January 1989	National Stadium, Ta' Qali, Ta' Qali, Malta	Israel	1–1	1–2	Friendly
3	26 April 1995	Dinamo Stadium (Minsk), Minsk, Belarus	Belarus	1–1	1–1	UEFA Euro 1996 qualification
4	27 January 1999	National Stadium, Ta' Qali, Ta' Qali, Malta	Bosnia and Herzegovina	1–1	2–1	Friendly
5	21 August 1999	Stadion Maksimir, Zagreb, Croatia	Croatia	1–2	1–2	UEFA Euro 2000 qualification
6	8 September 1999	National Stadium, Ta' Qali, Ta' Qali, Malta	Republic of Ireland	2–2	2–3	UEFA Euro 2000 qualification
7	15 December 1999	National Stadium, Ta' Qali, Ta' Qali, Malta	Lebanon	1–0	1–0	Friendly
8	20 January 2000	National Stadium, Ta' Qali, Ta' Qali, Malta	Qatar	1–0	2–0	Friendly
9	3 June 2000	National Stadium, Ta' Qali, Ta' Qali, Malta	England	1–2	1–2	Friendly
10	5 September 2001	Na Stínadlech, Teplicec, Czech Republic	Czech Republic	1–1	2–3	2002 FIFA World Cup qualification
11	14 November 2001	Hibernians Ground, Paola, Malta	Canada	1–0	2–1	Friendly
12	10 September 2003	Antalya Atatürk Stadium, Antalya, Turkey	Israel	2–1	2–2	UEFA Euro 2004 qualification

== See also ==
- List of men's footballers with 100 or more international caps
