= Christophe Ohrel =

Swiss footballer (born 1968)

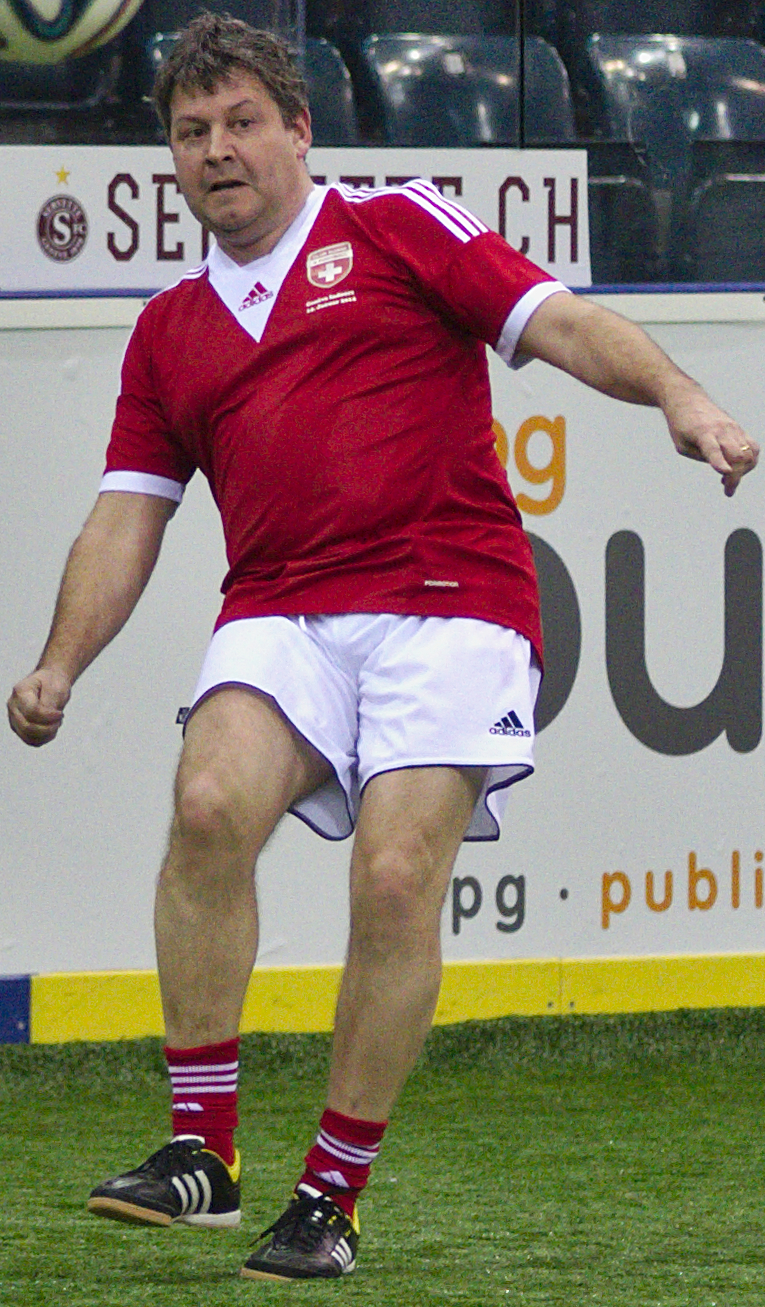
- Ohrel in 2014

Personal information
- Date of birth: 7 April 1968 (age 58)
- Place of birth: Strasbourg, France
- Height: 1.75 m (5 ft 9 in)
- Position: Defender

Senior career*
Years	Team	Apps	(Gls)
1986–1992	Lausanne-Sport	136	(7)
1992–1994	Servette	62	(3)
1994–1995	Rennes	34	(2)
1995–1996	Saint-Étienne	35	(0)
1996–2001	Lausanne Sport	159	(9)
2001–2002	FC Luzern	5	(0)
2002–2003	Yverdon-Sport	33	(1)
Total		464	(22)

International career
1991–1997	Switzerland	56	(6)
- * Club domestic league appearances and goals

Christophe Ohrel (born 7 April 1968) is a Swiss former professional footballer who played as a defender.

He was capped 56 times and scored 6 goals for the Switzerland national team. He was in the Swiss squad at the 1994 FIFA World Cup, playing all four games.

== Career statistics ==
=== Club ===
Appearances and goals by club, season and competition
Club	Season	League		
Club	Season	Division	Apps	Goals
Lausanne-Sport	1986–87		0	0
Lausanne-Sport	1987–88	Swiss Super League	10	1
Lausanne-Sport	1988–89	Swiss Super League	31	3
Lausanne-Sport	1989–90	Swiss Super League	34	1
Lausanne-Sport	1990–91	Swiss Super League	30	1
Lausanne-Sport	1991–92	Swiss Super League	31	1
Lausanne-Sport	Total		136	7
Servette	1992–93	Swiss Super League	31	2
Servette	1993–94	Swiss Super League	31	1
Servette	Total		62	3
Rennes	1994–95	French Division 1	34	2
Saint-Étienne	1995–96	French Division 1	35	0
Lausanne-Sport	1996–97	Swiss Super League	35	3
Lausanne-Sport	1997–98	Swiss Super League	29	3
Lausanne-Sport	1998–99	Swiss Super League	31	0
Lausanne-Sport	1999–2000	Swiss Super League	33	1
Lausanne-Sport	2000–01	Swiss Super League	31	2
Lausanne-Sport	Total		159	9
FC Luzern	2001–02	Swiss Super League	5	0
Yverdon-Sport	2001–02		14	0
Yverdon-Sport	2002–03		19	1
Yverdon-Sport	Total		33	1
Career total			464	22

=== International ===
Scores and results list Switzerland's goal tally first, score column indicates score after each Ohrel goal.

List of international goals scored by Christophe Ohrel
No.	Date	Venue	Opponent	Score	Result	Competition
1	5 June 1991	Espenmoos, St. Gallen, Switzerland	San Marino	5–0	7–0	UEFA Euro 1992 qualification
2	14 October 1992	Stadio Sant'Elia, Cagliari, Italy	Italy	1–0	2–2	1994 FIFA World Cup qualification
3	17 April 1993	Ta' Qali National Stadium, Mdina, Malta	Malta	1–0	2–0	1994 FIFA World Cup qualification
4	17 November 1993	Hardturm, Zürich, Switzerland	Estonia	3–0	4–0	1994 FIFA World Cup qualification
5	12 October 1994	Wankdorf Stadium, Bern, Switzerland	Sweden	1–1	4–2	UEFA Euro 1996 qualification
6	11 October 1995	Hardturm, Zürich, Switzerland	Hungary	3–0	3–0	UEFA Euro 1996 qualification
