= Herfried Sabitzer =

Austrian footballer

Personal information
- Date of birth: 19 October 1969 (age 57)
- Place of birth: Judenburg, Austria
- Height: 1.88 m (6 ft 2 in)
- Position: Forward

Youth career
- SC St. Georgen/Judenburg

Senior career*
Years	Team	Apps	(Gls)
1990–1991	Alpine Donawitz	32	(9)
1991–1993	SV Casino Salzburg	72	(19)
1994–1995	LASK	41	(11)
1995–1998	Grazer AK	88	(32)
1998–2000	Austria Salzburg	51	(8)
2001	BSV Bad Bleiberg	11	(7)
2001–2003	SV Mattersburg	38	(19)
Total		333	(105)

International career
1992–1997	Austria	6	(1)
- * Club domestic league appearances and goals

Herfried Sabitzer (born 19 October 1969) is an Austrian former professional footballer who played as a forward. He made six appearances for the Austria national team, scoring once. He is the father of footballer Marcel Sabitzer.

== Club career ==
Born in Styria, Sabitzer started his professional career at Alpine Donawitz and scored nine goals for them in his debut Bundesliga season. That earned him a move to SV Casino Salzburg where he formed a successful strike partnership with Heimo Pfeifenberger before losing his place to Nikola Jurčević. The burly striker moved to LASK and subsequently missed out on the 1994 UEFA Cup Final which Salzburg lost to Inter Milan. In 1995, he joined Grazer AK and scored a career-record 15 goals in the 1997–98 season, earning him a move back to Salzburg. He then lost the Austrian Cup final in 2000, losing to GAK.

During the 2000–01 season he went on to play for Second division side Bad Bleiberg and half a season later he moved on to SV Mattersburg. In his last professional season he scored 12 goals to earn Mattersburg promotion to the Austrian Football Bundesliga.

He then finished his playing career at SC Kalsdorf.

== International career ==
Sabitzer made his debut for Austria in 1992 and earned six caps, scoring one goal in a 7–0 UEFA Euro 1996 qualifying victory against Liechtenstein on 26 April 1995. His final international game was a March 1997 friendly match against Slovenia.

== Career statistics ==
Scores and results list Austria's goal tally first.

No	Date	Venue	Opponent	Score	Result	Competition
1.	26 April 1995	Stadion Lehen, Salzburg, Austria	Liechtenstein	4–0	7–0	Euro 1996 qualifier
