= Jevgeņijs Miļevskis =

Latvian footballer

Personal information
- Full name: Jevgeņijs Miļevskis
- Date of birth: 15 August 1961 (age 65)
- Place of birth: Riga, Latvian SSR, Soviet Union
- Height: 1.86 m (6 ft 1 in)
- Position: Striker

Senior career*
Years	Team	Apps	(Gls)
1980	FK Progress	?	(22)
1981–1984	FK Daugava Rīga	90	(28)
1984	Spartak Moscow	6	(0)
1985–1988	FK Daugava Rīga	170	(74)
1989–1991	FK Austria Wien	49	(15)
1991–1994	VSE Sankt Pölten	93	(13)

International career
1994	Latvia	3	(1)
- * Club domestic league appearances and goals

Jevgeņijs Miļevskis (born 15 August 1961) is a former Latvian football striker of Jewish origin. Together with Aleksandrs Starkovs he was the main goal scoring force of FK Daugava Rīga.

In 2006 Miļevskis was selected by the Latvian Football Federation as one of the 11 best Latvian footballers of the first 100 years of football in Latvia.

== Playing career ==
Miļevskis started playing under the best Latvian youth football coach Krišs Maisītājs in the Riga football school. Later he played with FK Progress under Jānis Skredelis. In 1981 Miļevskis joined Daugava Rīga and with his playing style soon attracted the interest of both fans and specialists. He got invitations to play for several top Soviet clubs including FC Dynamo Kyiv, FC Dynamo Moscow and PFC CSKA Moscow but eventually he joined Spartak Moscow. After having played several games for Spartak but not having been selected to participate in European competitions Miļevskis returned to Daugava. In the mid-1980s together with Starkovs Miļevskis made up one of the best attacks in the first Soviet league. For Daugava he scored more than 100 goals in official games.

In 1988 Miļevskis decided to emigrate to United States. However, he was contacted by FK Austria Wien officials and played there for two seasons (20 goals in 64 matches). With Austria Wien he became champion of Austrian Bundesliga, won the Austrian Cup and the Austrian Supercup (2 times). His last professional club was VSE Sankt Pölten where he played until 1994.

Miļevskis also played 3 games for Latvia in Euro 1996 qualifiers and scored Latvia's only goal in their 1–3 defeat against Portugal.
