= Alyaksandr Taykow =

Belarusian footballer

Alyaksandr Taykow Александр Владимирович Тайков
Personal information
- Full name: Alyaksandr Vladimirovich Taykow
- Date of birth: 23 June 1970 (age 56)
- Place of birth: Gorkiy, Soviet Union
- Height: 1.89 m (6 ft 2 1/2 in)
- Position: Defender

Youth career
- 1988–1989: Dinamo Minsk

Senior career*
Years	Team	Apps	(Gls)
1989–1995	Dinamo Minsk	99	(0)
1995–1996	Maccabi Herzliya	28	(1)
1996–1998	Hapoel Ashkelon	42	(1)
1998–1999	Hapoel Ashdod		

International career
1992–1996	Belarus	13	(1)
- * Club domestic league appearances and goals

Alyaksandr Vladimirovich Taykow (Russian: Александр Владимирович Тайков; born 23 June 1970) is a retired Belarusian professional footballer. Besides Belarus, he has played in Israel.

== Honours ==
Dinamo Minsk

- Belarusian Premier League champion: 1992, 1992–93, 1993–94, 1994–95, 1995
- Belarusian Cup winner: 1992, 1993–94
