= Daniel Šmejkal =

Czech football player and manager

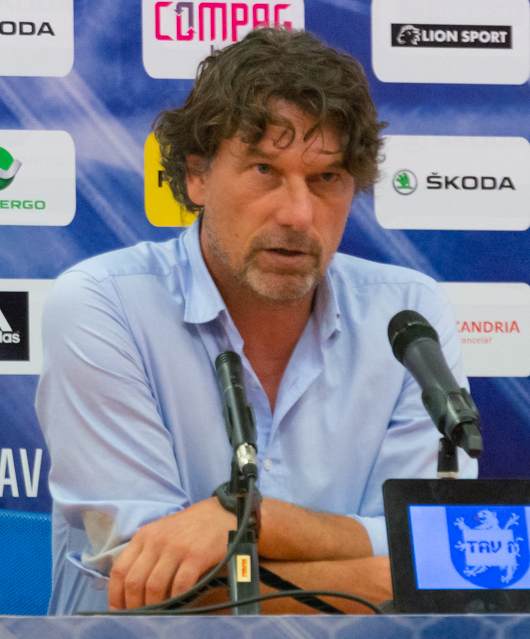
- Šmejkal in 2018

Personal information
- Date of birth: 28 August 1970 (age 56)
- Place of birth: Plzeň, Czechoslovakia
- Position: Midfielder

Team information
- Current team: Czech Republic U-19 women (manager)

Youth career
- 1976–1983: ZČE Plzeň
- 1983–1988: Škoda Plzeň

Senior career*
Years	Team	Apps	(Gls)
1988–1989	Škoda Plzeň	18	(0)
1989–1990	Dukla Prague	12	(0)
1991–1994	Viktoria Plzeň		
1994–1997	Slavia Prague	66	(8)
1997–1998	1. FC Nürnberg	23	(0)
1998–1999	KFC Uerdingen 05	14	(1)
1999–2002	Marila Příbram	70	(0)
2002–2005	FC Střížkov		
2006–2007	Viktorie Jirny		
2008–2009	FK Chmel Blšany		

International career
1988–1990	Czechoslovakia U21	12	(1)
1994–1995	Czech Republic	10	(3)

Managerial career
- 2014–2016: FK Baník Sokolov
- 2016–2018: FK Teplice
- 2019–2021: Vlašim
- 2021–2022: Prostějov
- 2023–2025: Czech Republic U-17 women
- 2025–: Czech Republic U-19 women
Medal record
SK Slavia Prague
Winner	Czech First League	1995–96
- * Club domestic league appearances and goals

Daniel Šmejkal (born 28 August 1970) is a Czech football manager who is the current manager of Czech Republic U-19 women. A former player, his playing position was midfielder. Šmejkal played for the Czech Republic national team, for whom he played a total of 10 matches and scored 3 goals.

== Playing career ==
=== Club career ===
Šmejkal played for Škoda Plzeň in the 1988–89 Czechoslovak First League and represented Dukla Prague in the same competition in the 1989–90 and 1990–91 seasons. After the establishment of the Czech First League in 1993, Šmejkal played for Plzeň again, by now renamed as Viktoria Plzeň, in the 1993–94 season, before spending three seasons with Slavia Prague, during which time he won the 1995–96 Czech First League. After spending some of his career in Germany, he returned to the Czech Republic, playing for three seasons with Marila Příbram until the end of the 2001–02 season. In total he made 197 appearances at the Czechoslovak, and later Czech, top level between 1988 and 2002.

=== National team ===
Šmejkal was involved in the Czechoslovakia national team's youth groups from the under-15 level and each additional level up to under-18, making 49 appearances between 1986 and 1988. He then played for Czechoslovakia national under-21 football team, scoring once in twelve appearances between 1988 and 1990. From 1994 until 1995 Šmejkal represented the Czech Republic internationally and scored three goals in ten appearances.

== Management career ==
Šmejkal became a coach after his playing career. Having led Sokolov to finishing positions of fifth and fourth in the second tier of Czech football, Šmejkal joined Czech First League side FK Teplice in the summer of 2016, signing a two-year contract.

Šmejkal moved to Vlašim in 2019. He then joined Prostějov in October 2021. He subsequently became the manager of the Czech Republic U-17 women team. In May 2025, Šmejkal was appointed as manager of Czech Republic U-19 women team.
