= Malta national football team results (1980–1999) =

- Win Draw Loss

This is a list of Malta national football team results from 1980 to 1999.

== 1980s ==
=== 1980 ===
27 February UEFA Euro 1980 qualifying	West Germany	8–0	Malta	Bremen, West Germany
	Allofs 11', 55'; Bonhof 19' (pen.); Fischer 40', 90'; Holland 61' (o.g.); Kelsch 70'; Rummenigge 74'	Report		Stadium: Weserstadion; Attendance: 33,278; Referee: Norbert Rolles (Luxembourg)

7 December 1982 FIFA World Cup qualification	Malta	0–2 (Note: The match was abandoned in the 77th minute after the Maltese fans threw stones and missiles at the referees and the Polish players after conceding the second goal. Baldacchino, Carmel (8 January 2009). "Serious incidents mar World Cup match against Poland". Times of Malta.)	Poland	Gżira, Malta
		Report	Smolarek 55'; Lipka 75'	Stadium: Empire Stadium; Attendance: 5,565; Referee: Dušan Maksimović (Yugoslavia)

=== 1981 ===
4 April 1982 FIFA World Cup qualification	Malta	1–2	East Germany	Gżira, Malta
	Fabri 11'	Report	Schnuphase 20' (pen.); Häfner 44'	Stadium: Empire Stadium; Attendance: 3,873; Referee: Peter Reeves (England)

14 June 1981 President's Cup	Liechtenstein	1–1	Malta	Daejeon, South Korea
	Sklarski 29'	Report	Buttigieg 80'	Stadium: Daejeon Hanbat Stadium; Attendance: 2,000; Referee: Hassan Daud (Malaysia)

18 June 1981 President's Cup	Indonesia	0–1	Malta	Daegu, South Korea
		Report	Xuereb 27'	Stadium: Daegu Civil Stadium; Attendance: 2,403; Referee: Park Kyoung Wha (South Korea)

22 June 1981 President's Cup	Thailand	0–2	Malta	Seoul, South Korea
		Report	Degiorgio 9'; Ge. Xuereb 80'	Stadium: Dongdaemun Stadium; Attendance: 1,000; Referee: Hassan Daud (Malaysia)

24 October International Friendly	Tunisia	0–1	Malta	Tunis, Tunisia
		Report	Tortell 62'	Stadium: Stade Chedly Zouiten; Attendance: 9,000; Referee: Habib Akrout (Tunisia)

11 November 1982 FIFA World Cup qualification	East Germany	5–1	Malta	Jena, East Germany
	Krause 11'; Streich 35', 75'; Heun 71'; Holland 90' (o.g.)	Report	Spiteri-Gonzi 41'	Stadium: Ernst Abbe Sportfeld; Attendance: 1,908; Referee: Frederic McKnight (Northern Ireland)

15 November 1982 FIFA World Cup qualification	Poland	6–0	Malta	Wrocław, Poland
	Iwan 6'; Smolarek 46', 64'; Majewski 48'; Dziekanowski 80'; Boniek 85'	Report		Stadium: Olympic Stadium; Attendance: 25,618; Referee: Bo Helen (Sweden)

=== 1982 ===
5 June UEFA Euro 1984 qualifying	Malta	2–1	Iceland	Messina, Italy
	Spiteri Gonzi 44'; Fabri 48'	Report	Geirsson 51' (pen.)	Stadium: Stadio Comunale Giovanni Celeste; Attendance: 1,271; Referee: Pietro D'Elia (Italy)

14 October International Friendly	Bulgaria	7–0	Malta	Sofia, Bulgaria
	Kerimov 13'; Blangev 21'; Velichkov 33'; Slavkov 5', 70', 78'; Dimitrov 60'	Report		Stadium: Vasil Levski National Stadium; Attendance: 12,000; Referee: Yordan Zhezhov (Bulgaria)

19 December UEFA Euro 1984 qualifying	Malta	0–6	Netherlands	Aachen, Netherlands
		Report	Ophof 22' (pen.); Van Kooten 25', 71'; Hovenkamp 34'; Schoenaker 39', 51'	Stadium: Tivoli Stadium; Attendance: 17,000; Referee: Dieter Pauly (West Germany)

26 December International Friendly	Malta	0–0	Bulgaria	Ta' Qali, Malta
		Report		Stadium: Ta' Qali National Stadium; Attendance: 1,701; Referee: Edwin Borg (Malta)

=== 1983 ===
1 February International Friendly	Malta	1–2	Tunisia	Marsa, Malta
	Fabri 8'	Report	El Fahem 18'; Dhiab 21'	Stadium: Marsa Stadium; Attendance: 445; Referee: Edgar Azzopardi (Malta)

30 March UEFA Euro 1984 qualifying	Malta	0–1	Republic of Ireland	Ta' Qali, Malta
		Report	Stapleton 89'	Stadium: Ta' Qali National Stadium; Attendance: 6,487; Referee: Adolf Mathias (Austria)

15 May UEFA Euro 1984 qualifying	Malta	2–3	Spain	Ta' Qali, Malta
	Busuttil 30', 47'	Report	Señor 21'; Carrasco 60'; Gordillo 84'	Stadium: Ta' Qali National Stadium; Attendance: 7,732; Referee: Evangelos Giannakoudakis (Greece)

5 June UEFA Euro 1984 qualifying	Iceland	1–0	Malta	Reykjavík, Iceland
	Eðvaldsson 43'	Report		Stadium: Laugardalsvöllur; Attendance: 5,718; Referee: Alex Jacobsen (Denmark)

9 October International Friendly	Libya	4–0	Malta	Tripoli, Libya
	Al-Madani 11'; Bani 53'; Nuwara 81'; Al-Sharif 89'	Report		Stadium: June 11 Stadium; Attendance: 3,000; Referee: Mohamed Saudi (Libya)

16 November UEFA Euro 1984 qualifying	Republic of Ireland	8–0	Malta	Dublin, Ireland
	Lawrenson 25', 63'; Stapleton 28'; O'Callaghan 35'; Sheedy 74', 84'; Brady 76'; Daly 86'	Report		Stadium: Dalymount Park; Attendance: 8,500; Referee: Ole Amundsen (Denmark)

17 December UEFA Euro 1984 qualifying	Netherlands	5–0	Malta	Rotterdam, Netherlands
	Brocken 19'; Wijnstekers 30'; Rijkaard 74', 90'; Houtman 79'	Report		Stadium: De Kuip; Attendance: 58,000; Referee: Klaus Peschel (East Germany)

21 December UEFA Euro 1984 qualifying	Spain	12–1	Malta	Seville, Spain
	Santillana 16', 26', 29', 76'; Poli Rincón 47', 57', 64', 78'; Maceda 62', 63'; Sarabia 80'; Señor 83'	Report	Degiorgio 24'	Stadium: Estadio Benito Villamarín; Attendance: 25,000; Referee: Erkan Göksel (Turkey)

=== 1984 ===
23 May 1986 FIFA World Cup qualification	Sweden	4–0	Malta	Norrköping, Sweden
	Sunesson 4', 75'; Corneliusson 37'; Erlandsson 70' (pen.)	Report		Stadium: Idrottsparken; Attendance: 18,819; Referee: David Syme (Scotland)

6 September International Friendly	Israel	2–1	Malta	Jerusalem, Israel
	Malmilian 34', 78'	Report	Muscat 21'	Stadium: YMCA Stadium; Attendance: 300; Referee: Ovadia Ben Itzhak (Israel)

31 October 1986 FIFA World Cup qualification	Czechoslovakia	4–0	Malta	Prague, Czechoslovakia
	Janečka 4', 71'; Jarolím 35'; Berger 77' (pen.)	Report		Stadium: Stadion Evžena Rošického; Attendance: 3,450; Referee: Gudmundur Haraldsson (Iceland)

5 December International Friendly	Malta	1–2	Italy U-21	Ta' Qali, Malta
	Muscat 72'	Report	Vialli 39'; Mancini 49' (pen.)	Stadium: Ta' Qali National Stadium; Attendance: 2,203; Referee: Edgar Azzopardi (Malta)

16 December 1986 FIFA World Cup qualification	Malta	2–3	West Germany	Ta' Qali, Malta
	Busuttil 10'; Xuereb 84'	Report	Förster 43'; Allofs 68', 83'	Stadium: Ta' Qali National Stadium; Attendance: 35,102; Referee: Zoran Petrovic (Yugoslavia)

=== 1985 ===
10 February 1986 FIFA World Cup qualification	Malta	1–3	Portugal	Ta' Qali, Malta
	Farrugia 59'	Report	Carlos Manuel 6'; Fernando Gomes 13', 74'	Stadium: Ta' Qali National Stadium; Attendance: 22,610; Referee: Miklós Nagy (Hungary)

27 March 1986 FIFA World Cup qualification	West Germany	6–0	Malta	Saarbrücken, West Germany
	Rahn 10', 17'; Magath 13'; Littbarski 18'; Rummenigge 43', 67'	Report		Stadium: Ludwigsparkstadion; Attendance: 37,600; Referee: Talat Tokat (Turkey)

3 April International Friendly	Malta	3–1	Jordan	Ta' Qali, Malta
	Xuereb 57', 67' (pen.), 80'	Report	Saddieh 90'	Stadium: Ta' Qali National Stadium; Attendance: 399; Referee: Charles Scerri (Malta)

21 April 1986 FIFA World Cup qualification	Malta	0–0	Czechoslovakia	Ta' Qali, Malta
		Report		Stadium: Ta' Qali National Stadium; Attendance: 7,320; Referee: Victoriano Sánchez Arminio (Spain)

12 October 1986 FIFA World Cup qualification	Portugal	3–2	Malta	Lisbon, Portugal
	Fernando Gomes 37', 79'; Rafael 50'	Report	Frederico 46' (o.g.); Degiorgio 78'	Stadium: Estádio da Luz; Attendance: 15,000; Referee: Alan Snoddy (Northern Ireland)

17 November 1986 FIFA World Cup qualification	Malta	1–2	Sweden	Ta' Qali, Malta
	Farrugia 65'	Report	Prytz 2'; Strömberg 76'	Stadium: Ta' Qali National Stadium; Attendance: 6,849; Referee: Yusuf Namoglu (Turkey)

=== 1986 ===
16 November UEFA Euro 1988 qualifying	Malta	0–5	Sweden	Ta' Qali, Malta
		Report	Hysén 38'; Magnusson 67'; Fredriksson 69'; Ekström 82', 84'	Stadium: Ta' Qali National Stadium; Attendance: 8,311; Referee: Lajos Hartmann (Hungary)

6 December UEFA Euro 1988 qualifying	Malta	0–2	Italy	Ta' Qali, Malta
		Report	Ferri 12'; Altobelli 19'	Stadium: Ta' Qali National Stadium; Attendance: 13,191; Referee: Ihsan Türe (Turkey)

=== 1987 ===
24 January UEFA Euro 1988 qualifying	Italy	5–0	Malta	Bergamo, Italy
	Bagni 4'; Bergomi 9'; Altobelli 24', 35'; Vialli 45'	Report		Stadium: Stadio Atleti Azzurri d'Italia; Attendance: 32,370; Referee: Stephanos Hadjistefanou (Cyprus)

29 March UEFA Euro 1988 qualifying	Portugal	2–2	Malta	Funchal, Portugal
	Plácido 11', 77'	Report	Mizzi 23'; Busuttil 68'	Stadium: Estádio dos Barreiros; Attendance: 12,000; Referee: John Kinsella (Ireland)

15 April UEFA Euro 1988 qualifying	Switzerland	4–1	Malta	Neuchâtel, Switzerland
	Egli 5'; Bregy 16', 38' (pen.), 87'	Report	Busuttil 71'	Stadium: Stade de la Maladière; Attendance: 5,400; Referee: Roger Philippi (Luxembourg)

24 May UEFA Euro 1988 qualifying	Sweden	1–0	Malta	Gothenburg, Sweden
	Ekström 13'	Report		Stadium: Nya Ullevi; Attendance: 16,165; Referee: Kaj Natri (Finland)

14 October International Friendly	Malta	0–2	England B	Ta' Qali, Malta
		Report	Sterland 33'; Harford 58'	Stadium: Ta' Qali National Stadium; Attendance: 4,200; Referee: Charles Scerri (Malta)

15 November UEFA Euro 1988 qualifying	Malta	1–1	Switzerland	Ta' Qali, Malta
	Busuttil 89'	Report	Zwicker 2'	Stadium: Ta' Qali National Stadium; Attendance: 7,112; Referee: Georgios Koukoulakis (Greece)

2 December International Friendly	Israel	1–1	Malta	Haifa, Israel
	Ovadia 7'	Report	Mizzi 44' (pen.)	Stadium: Kiryat Eliezer Stadium; Attendance: 2,500; Referee: Arie Frost (Israel)

20 December UEFA Euro 1988 qualifying	Malta	0–1	Portugal	Ta' Qali, Malta
		Report	Rosa 74'	Stadium: Ta' Qali National Stadium; Attendance: 5,651; Referee: Hubert Forstinger (Austria)

=== 1988 ===
7 February 1988 Rothmans Tournament	Malta	2–0	Finland	Ta' Qali, Malta
	Busuttil 32', 35'	Report		Stadium: Ta' Qali National Stadium; Attendance: 4,940; Referee: Edgar Azzopardi (Malta)

10 February 1988 Rothmans Tournament	Malta	2–1	Tunisia	Ta' Qali, Malta
	Vella 59'; Busuttil 71'	Report	Maâloul 30' (pen.)	Stadium: Ta' Qali National Stadium; Attendance: 4,000; Referee: Victor Mintoff (Malta)

13 February 1988 Rothmans Tournament	Malta	0–1	East Germany	Ta' Qali, Malta
		Report	Halata 43'	Stadium: Ta' Qali National Stadium; Attendance: 5,251; Referee: Charles Scerri (Malta)

10 March International Friendly	Libya	1–0 (Note: The match was abandoned in the 43rd minute following the collapse of a section of the main spectator stand.)	Malta	Tripoli, Libya
	Khair 17'	Report		Stadium: June 11 Stadium; Attendance: 65,000; Referee: Mohamed Ibrahim Assaudi (Libya)

22 March International Friendly	Malta	1–1	Scotland	Ta' Qali, Malta
	Busuttil 54'	Report	Sharp 21'	Stadium: Ta' Qali National Stadium; Attendance: 3,470; Referee: George Courtney (England)

21 May 1990 FIFA World Cup qualification	Northern Ireland	3–0	Malta	Belfast, Northern Ireland
	Quinn 14'; Penney 23'; Clarke 25'	Report		Stadium: Windsor Park; Attendance: 9,000; Referee: Carlos Silva Valente (Portugal)

1 June International Friendly	Malta	2–3	Wales	Ta' Qali, Malta
	Busuttil 15', 23'	Report	Horne 9'; Hughes 53'; Rush 74'	Stadium: Ta' Qali National Stadium; Attendance: 4,836; Referee: Edgar Azzopardi (Malta)

12 October International Friendly	Cyprus	0–1	Malta	Limassol, Cyprus
		Report	Busuttil 87'	Stadium: Tsirion Athletic Center; Attendance: 2,500; Referee: Kyros Georgiou (Cyprus)

18 October International Friendly	Israel	2–0	Malta	Limassol, Cyprus
	Sinai 1'; Driks 86'	Report		Stadium: Arthur Vasermil Municipal Stadium; Attendance: 3,000; Referee: Manfred Neuner (West Germany)

23 November International Friendly	Malta	1–1	Cyprus	Ta' Qali, Malta
	Carabott 16'	Report	Ioannou 83'	Stadium: Ta' Qali National Stadium; Attendance: 2,627; Referee: Charles Agius (Malta)

11 December 1990 FIFA World Cup qualification	Malta	2–2	Hungary	Ta' Qali, Malta
	Busuttil 46', 90'	Report	Vincze 5'; Kiprich 56'	Stadium: Ta' Qali National Stadium; Attendance: 9,964; Referee: Georgios Koukoulakis (Greece)

=== 1989 ===
11 January International Friendly	Malta	1–2	Israel	Ta' Qali, Malta
	Carabott 32'	Report	Menahem 12'; Sinai 89'	Stadium: Ta' Qali National Stadium; Attendance: 2,441; Referee: Victor Mintoff (Malta)

22 January 1990 FIFA World Cup qualification	Malta	0–2	Spain	Ta' Qali, Malta
		Report	Míchel 15' (pen.); Beguiristain 49'	Stadium: Ta' Qali National Stadium; Attendance: 15,797; Referee: David Syme (Scotland)

8 February 1989 Rothmans Tournament	Malta	0–2	Denmark	Ta' Qali, Malta
		Report	Elstrup 53' (pen.); Larsen 83'	Stadium: Ta' Qali National Stadium; Attendance: 2,587; Referee: Mohamed Minoune (Algeria)

10 February 1989 Rothmans Tournament	Malta	0–1	Algeria	Ta' Qali, Malta
		Report	Zorgane 22'	Stadium: Ta' Qali National Stadium; Attendance: 2,497; Referee: Esa Palsi (Finland)

12 February 1989 Rothmans Tournament	Malta	0–0	Finland	Ta' Qali, Malta
		Report		Stadium: Ta' Qali National Stadium; Attendance: 2,798; Referee: Kurt Sørensen (Denmark)

23 March 1990 FIFA World Cup qualification	Spain	4–0	Malta	Seville, Spain
	Míchel 38', 68' (pen.); Manolo 71', 80'	Report		Stadium: Estadio Benito Villamarín; Attendance: 41,500; Referee: Georges Sandoz (Switzerland)

12 April 1990 FIFA World Cup qualification	Hungary	1–1	Malta	Budapest, Hungary
	Boda 49' (pen.)	Report	Busuttil 7'	Stadium: Népstadion; Attendance: 25,000; Referee: Arie Frost (Israel)

26 April 1990 FIFA World Cup qualification	Malta	0–2	Northern Ireland	Ta' Qali, Malta
		Report	Clarke 55'; O'Neill 73'	Stadium: Ta' Qali National Stadium; Attendance: 15,150; Referee: Silviu Petrescu (Romania)

28 May 1990 FIFA World Cup qualification	Republic of Ireland	2–0	Malta	Dublin, Ireland
	Houghton 32'; Moran 55'	Report		Stadium: Lansdowne Road; Attendance: 48,928; Referee: José Rosa dos Santos (Portugal)

4 October International Friendly	Malta	1–2	Austria	Ta' Qali, Malta
	Zarb 15'	Report	Glatzmayer 25'; Rodax 68'	Stadium: Ta' Qali National Stadium; Attendance: 2,352; Referee: Carlo Longhi (Italy)

11 October International Friendly	Cyprus	0–0	Malta	Larnaca, Cyprus
		Report		Stadium: GSZ Stadium; Attendance: 250; Referee: Hristos Skapoulis (Cyprus)

25 October International Friendly	Malta	0–4	East Germany	Ta' Qali, Malta
		Report	Doll 10', 32'; Steinmann 73' (pen.), 86'	Stadium: Ta' Qali National Stadium; Attendance: 1,897; Referee: Edgar Azzopardi (Malta)

15 November 1990 FIFA World Cup qualification	Malta	0–2	Republic of Ireland	Ta' Qali, Malta
		Report	Aldridge 31', 68' (pen.)	Stadium: Ta' Qali National Stadium; Attendance: 21,942; Referee: Jaap Uilenberg (Netherlands)

== 1990s ==
=== 1990 ===
7 February 1990 Rothmans Tournament	Malta	1–1	Norway	Ta' Qali, Malta
	Scerri 38'	Report	Fjørtoft 22'	Stadium: Ta' Qali National Stadium; Attendance: 1,893; Referee: Edgar Azzopardi (Malta)

10 February 1990 Rothmans Tournament	Malta	1–2	South Korea	Ta' Qali, Malta
	Laferla 83'	Report	Baek Jong-chul 39'; Hwangbo Kwan 75'	Stadium: Ta' Qali National Stadium; Attendance: 3,544; Referee: Thorodd Pressberg (Norway)

5 May International Friendly	United States	1–0	Malta	Piscataway, United States
	Wynalda 7'	Report		Stadium: Rutgers Stadium; Attendance: 8,064; Referee: Arturo Angeles (United States)

28 May International Friendly	Malta	1–2	Scotland	Ta' Qali, Malta
	Degiorgio 53'	Report	McInally 5', 81'	Stadium: Ta' Qali National Stadium; Attendance: 3,938; Referee: Carlo Longhi (Italy)

2 June International Friendly	Malta	0–3	Republic of Ireland	Ta' Qali, Malta
		Report	Quinn 43'; Townsend 77'; Stapleton 87'	Stadium: Ta' Qali National Stadium; Attendance: 2,232; Referee: Edgar Azzopardi (Malta)

31 October UEFA Euro 1992 qualifying	Greece	4–0	Malta	Athens, Greece
	Tsiantakis 37'; Karapialis 40'; Saravakos 59'; Borbokis 88'	Report		Stadium: Olympic Stadium; Attendance: 7,768; Referee: Ion Crăciunescu (Romania)

25 November UEFA Euro 1992 qualifying	Malta	1–1	Finland	Ta' Qali, Malta
	Suda 37'	Report	Holmgren 87'	Stadium: Ta' Qali National Stadium; Attendance: 8,667; Referee: Sadik Deda (Turkey)

19 December UEFA Euro 1992 qualifying	Malta	0–8	Netherlands	Ta' Qali, Malta
		Report	Van Basten 9', 20', 23', 64', 80' (pen.); Winter 53'; Bergkamp 60', 66'	Stadium: Ta' Qali National Stadium; Attendance: 10,254; Referee: Rolf Blattmann (Switzerland)

=== 1991 ===
9 February UEFA Euro 1992 qualifying	Malta	0–1	Portugal	Ta' Qali, Malta
		Report	Futre 27'	Stadium: Ta' Qali National Stadium; Attendance: 3,264; Referee: Manfred Neuner (Germany)

20 February UEFA Euro 1992 qualifying	Portugal	5–0	Malta	Porto, Portugal
	Águas 5'; Leal 34'; Paneira 41' (pen.); Futre 48'; Cadete 81'	Report		Stadium: Estádio das Antas; Attendance: 5,303; Referee: John Spillane (Ireland)

13 March UEFA Euro 1992 qualifying	Netherlands	1–0	Malta	Rotterdam, Netherlands
	Van Basten 31' (pen.)	Report		Stadium: De Kuip; Attendance: 36,383; Referee: Dušan Krchnák (Czechoslovakia)

7 May International Friendly	Malta	1–4	Iceland	Ta' Qali, Malta
	Suda 70' (pen.)	Report	Kristinsson 13', 56'; Grétarsson 17'; Marteinsson 85'	Stadium: Ta' Qali National Stadium; Attendance: 579; Referee: Edgar Azzopardi (Malta)

16 May UEFA Euro 1992 qualifying	Finland	2–0	Malta	Helsinki, Finland
	Järvinen 51'; Litmanen 87'	Report		Stadium: Olympic Stadium; Attendance: 5,150; Referee: Rune Pedersen (Norway)

7 June 1991 President's Cup	Indonesia	0–3	Malta	Seoul, South Korea
		Report	Suda 44'; Scerri 77'; Degiorgio 80'	Stadium: Olympic Stadium; Attendance: 1,000; Referee: Choi Gil-soo (South Korea)

9 June 1991 President's Cup	Egypt	5–2	Malta	Daejon, South Korea
	El-Sagheer 6'; Ramzy 21'; H. Hassan 49', 84'; Abdelghani 60'	Report	Brincat 38'; Suda 64' (pen.)	Stadium: Daejon Complex; Attendance: 500; Referee: Han Nam-sik (South Korea)

11 June 1991 President's Cup	South Korea	1–1	Malta	Gwangju, South Korea
	Ha Seok-ju 73'	Report	Suda 89'	Stadium: Gwangju Mudeung Stadium; Attendance: 3,000; Referee: Withaya Wongsmarn (Thailand)

27 November International Friendly	Malta	2–0	Libya	Ta' Qali, Malta
	Brincat 44'; Sultana 88'	Report		Stadium: Ta' Qali National Stadium; Attendance: 1,865; Referee: Victor Mintoff (Malta)

22 December UEFA Euro 1992 qualifying	Malta	1–1	Greece	Ta' Qali, Malta
	Sultana 42'	Report	Marinakis 67'	Stadium: Ta' Qali National Stadium; Attendance: 6,690; Referee: Michel Girard (France

=== 1992 ===
10 February 1992 Rothmans Tournament	Malta	1–0	Iceland	Ta' Qali, Malta
	Jesmond Zerafa 38'	Report		Stadium: Ta' Qali National Stadium; Attendance: 2,522; Referee: Charles Agius (Malta)

26 May International Friendly	Malta	1–0	Latvia	Ta' Qali, Malta
	Saliba 49'	Report		Stadium: Ta' Qali National Stadium; Attendance: 1,214; Referee: Charles Agius (Malta)

7 October International Friendly	Cyprus	3–0	Malta	Limassol, Cyprus
	Hadjiloukas 52'; Costa 60'; Ioannou 74'	Report		Stadium: Tsirion Athletic Center; Attendance: 1,000; Referee: Andreas Georgiou (Cyprus)

25 October 1994 FIFA World Cup qualification	Malta	0–0	Estonia	Ta' Qali, Malta
		Report		Stadium: Ta' Qali National Stadium; Attendance: 1,456; Referee: Oğuz Sarvan (Turkey)

18 November 1994 FIFA World Cup qualification	Switzerland	3–0	Malta	Bern, Switzerland
	Bickel 2'; Sforza 44'; Chapuisat 89'	Report		Stadium: Wankdorf; Attendance: 14,200; Referee: Sergei Khusainov (Russia)

19 December 1994 FIFA World Cup qualification	Malta	1–2	Italy	Ta' Qali, Malta
	Gregory 85'	Report	Vialli 59'; Signori 62'	Stadium: Ta' Qali National Stadium; Attendance: 14,191; Referee: Guy Goethals (Belgium)

=== 1993 ===
24 January 1994 FIFA World Cup qualification	Malta	0–1	Portugal	Ta' Qali, Malta
		Report	Rui Aguas 58'	Stadium: Ta' Qali National Stadium; Attendance: 11,500; Referee: David Elleray (England)

17 February 1994 FIFA World Cup qualification	Scotland	3–0	Malta	Glasgow, Scotland
	McCoist 15', 68'; Nevin 84'	Report		Stadium: Ibrox Park; Attendance: 35,490; Referee: Ilkka Koho (Finland)

24 March 1994 FIFA World Cup qualification	Italy	6–1	Malta	Palermo, Italy
	D. Baggio 19'; Signori 38'; Vierchowod 48'; Mancini 58', 89'; Maldini 73'	Report	Busuttil 68' (pen.)	Stadium: La Favorita; Attendance: 33,720; Referee: Vassilios Nikakis (Greece)

17 April 1994 FIFA World Cup qualification	Malta	0–2	Switzerland	Ta' Qali, Malta
		Report	Ohrel 31'; Türkyilmaz 89'	Stadium: Ta' Qali National Stadium; Attendance: 7,837; Referee: Ion Crăciunescu (Romania)

12 May 1994 FIFA World Cup qualification	Estonia	0–1	Malta	Tallinn, Estonia
		Report	Laferla 16'	Stadium: Kadrioru; Attendance: 4,500; Referee: Markus Merk (Germany)

19 June 1994 FIFA World Cup qualification	Portugal	4–0	Malta	Porto, Portugal
	Nogueira 1'; Rui Costa 8'; João Pinto 23'; Cadete 85'	Report		Stadium: Estádio do Bessa; Attendance: 10,000; Referee: Jiří Ulrich (Czech Republic)

5 November Coupe 7 Novembre 1993	Egypt	3–0	Malta	Tunis, Tunisia
	H. Hassan 21'; Abdel-Galil 71'; Khashaba 92'	Report		Stadium: Stade Olympique El Menzah; Attendance: 2,000; Referee: Fethi Boucetta (Tunisia)

7 November Coupe 7 Novembre 1993	Gabon	1–2	Malta	Tunis, Tunisia
	P. Ndong 86' (pen.)	Report	Brincat 11'; Busuttil 36'	Stadium: Stade Olympique El Menzah; Attendance: 7,000; Referee: Rachid Ben Khedija (Tunisia)

17 November 1994 FIFA World Cup qualification	Malta	0–2	Scotland	Ta' Qali, Malta
		Report	McKinlay 15'; Hendry 74'	Stadium: Ta' Qali National Stadium; Attendance: 8,900; Referee: Periklis Vassilakis (Greece)

=== 1994 ===
8 February 1994 Rothmans Tournament	Malta	1–1	Tunisia	Ta' Qali, Malta
	Vella 44'	Report	Souayah 22' (pen.)	Stadium: Ta' Qali National Stadium; Attendance: 650; Referee: Guram Sepiashvili (Georgia)

10 February 1994 Rothmans Tournament	Malta	0–1	Georgia	Ta' Qali, Malta
		Report	Ketsbaia 16' (pen.)	Stadium: Ta' Qali National Stadium; Attendance: 650; Referee: Darko Jamšek (Slovenia)

12 February 1994 Rothmans Tournament	Malta	0–1	Slovenia	Ta' Qali, Malta
		Report	Gliha 54'	Stadium: Ta' Qali National Stadium; Attendance: 3,000; Referee: Mohamed Bellagha (Tunisia)

16 February International Friendly	Malta	1–0	Belgium	Ta' Qali, Malta
	Busuttil 35'	Report		Stadium: Ta' Qali National Stadium; Attendance: 2,640; Referee: Angelo Amendolia (Italy)

30 March International Friendly	Malta	1–2	Slovakia	Ta' Qali, Malta
	Laferla 44'	Report	Timko 13'; Hýravý 69'	Stadium: Ta' Qali National Stadium; Attendance: 1,420; Referee: Loris Stafoggia (Italy)

30 March International Friendly	Malta	5–0	Azerbaijan	Ta' Qali, Malta
	Saliba 2'; Laferla 17'; Busuttil 69'; Camilleri 78'; Scerri 89'	Report		Stadium: Ta' Qali National Stadium; Attendance: 1,608; Referee: Abdullah Salem (Libya)

2 June International Friendly	Latvia	2–0	Malta	Riga, Latvia
	Drupass 41'; Astafjevs 47'	Report		Stadium: Daugavas Stadions; Attendance: 2,500; Referee: Oleg Timofejev (Estonia)

16 July International Friendly	Armenia	1–0	Malta	Yerevan, Armenia
	Avetisyan 64'	Report		Stadium: Hrazdan Stadium; Attendance: 5,000; Referee: Werner Müller (Switzerland)

19 July International Friendly	Georgia	1–1	Malta	Tbilisi, Georgia
	Arveladze 37' (pen.)	Report	Spiteri 33'	Stadium: Boris Paichadze National Stadium; Attendance: 35,200; Referee: Urs Meier (Switzerland)

16 August International Friendly	Slovakia	1–1	Malta	Bratislava, Slovakia
	Hipp 2'	Report	Laferla 75'	Stadium: Tehelné pole Attendance: 6,100; Referee: Hubert Forstinger (Austria)

6 September UEFA Euro 1996 qualifying	Czech Republic	6–1	Malta	Ostrava, Czech Republic
	Šmejkal 5' (pen.); Kubík 32'; Siegl 34', 60', 77'; Berger 86'	Report	Laferla 63'	Stadium: Bazaly; Attendance: 10,226; Referee: Loizos Loizou (Cyprus)

12 October UEFA Euro 1996 qualifying	Malta	0–0	Czech Republic	Ta' Qali, Malta
		Report		Stadium: Ta' Qali National Stadium; Attendance: 3,088; Referee: Jorge Monteiro Coroado (Portugal)

14 December UEFA Euro 1996 qualifying	Malta	0–1	Norway	Ta' Qali, Malta
		Report	Fjørtoft 10'	Stadium: Ta' Qali National Stadium; Attendance: 5,717; Referee: Gianni Beschin (Italy)

=== 1995 ===
22 February UEFA Euro 1996 qualifying	Malta	0–1	Luxembourg	Ta' Qali, Malta
		Report	Cardoni 55'	Stadium: Ta' Qali National Stadium; Attendance: 7,327; Referee: Mateo Beusan (Croatia)

29 March UEFA Euro 1996 qualifying	Netherlands	4–0	Malta	Rotterdam, Netherlands
	Seedorf 38'; Bergkamp 77' (pen.); Winter 79'; Kluivert 84'	Report		Stadium: De Kuip; Attendance: 30,288; Referee: Gylfi Thór Orrason (Iceland)

26 April UEFA Euro 1996 qualifying	Belarus	1–1	Malta	Minsk, Belarus
	Taykov 57'	Report	Carabott 71'	Stadium: Dinamo Stadium; Attendance: 6,915; Referee: Ladislav Gadoši (Slovakia)

7 June UEFA Euro 1996 qualifying	Norway	2–0	Malta	Oslo, Norway
	Fjørtoft 43'; Flo 88'	Report		Stadium: Ullevaal; Attendance: 15,180; Referee: Zbigniew Przesmycki (Poland)

16 August International Friendly	Malta	2–1	Albania	Ta' Qali, Malta
	Saliba 21'; Sant Fournier 83'	Report	Bushi 72'	Stadium: Ta' Qali National Stadium; Attendance: 1,500; Referee: Walter Cinciripini (Italy)

6 September UEFA Euro 1996 qualifying	Luxembourg	1–0	Malta	Luxembourg City, Luxembourg
	Holtz 44'	Report		Stadium: Stade Josy Barthel; Attendance: 4,809; Referee: Algirdas Dubinskas (Lithuania)

11 October UEFA Euro 1996 qualifying	Malta	0–4	Netherlands	Ta' Qali, Malta
		Report	Overmars 52', 61', 66'; Seedorf 82'	Stadium: Ta' Qali National Stadium; Attendance: 10,502; Referee: Kim Milton Nielsen (Denmark)

12 November UEFA Euro 1996 qualifying	Malta	0–2	Belarus	Ta' Qali, Malta
		Report	Gerasimets 79', 83'	Stadium: Ta' Qali National Stadium; Attendance: 3,025; Referee: Metin Tokat (Turkey)

=== 1996 ===
7 February 1996 Rothmans Tournament	Malta	0–2	Russia	Ta' Qali, Malta
		Report	Karpin 26'; Kiriakov 61'	Stadium: Ta' Qali National Stadium; Attendance: 1,800; Referee: Milan Mitrović (Slovenia)

9 February 1996 Rothmans Tournament	Malta	0–0	Slovenia	Ta' Qali, Malta
		Report		Stadium: Ta' Qali National Stadium; Attendance: 500; Referee: Guðmundur Maríasson (Iceland)

11 February 1996 Rothmans Tournament	Malta	1–4	Iceland	Ta' Qali, Malta
	Zahra 69'	Report	Þórðarson 7'; Gunnlaugsson 27'; Grétarsson 44'; Guðjohnsen 45'	Stadium: Ta' Qali National Stadium; Attendance: 500; Referee: Sergei Khusainov (Russia)

27 March International Friendly	Macedonia	1–0	Malta	Prilep, Macedonia
	Ćirić 73'	Report		Stadium: Stadion Goce Delčev; Attendance: 3,000; Referee: İbrahim Aksoy (Turkey)

2 June 1998 FIFA World Cup qualification	FR Yugoslavia	6–0	Malta	Belgrade, FR Yugoslavia
	Mirković 2'; Mijatović 39'; D. Stojković 45+1'; Milošević 68'; Savićević 70' (pen.), 73'	Report		Stadium: Stadion Crvena Zvezda; Attendance: 11,617; Referee: Hermann Albrecht (Germany)

14 August International Friendly	Iceland	2–1	Malta	Reykjavík, Iceland
	Adolfsson 17'; Daðason 72'	Report	Agius 42'	Stadium: Laugardalsvöllur; Attendance: 1,301; Referee: Stephen Lodge (England)

18 September 1998 FIFA World Cup qualification	Czech Republic	6–0	Malta	Teplice, Czech Republic
	Berger 11', 63' (pen.); Nedvěd 29'; Kubík 77'; Šmicer 83'; Frýdek 86'	Report		Stadium: Na Stínadlech; Attendance: 15,099; Referee: Mateo Beušan (Croatia)

22 September 1998 FIFA World Cup qualification	Slovakia	6–0	Malta	Bratislava, Slovakia
	Tittel 13', 90'; Šimon 15'; Zeman 37'; Timko 56'; Dubovský 59'	Report		Stadium: Tehelné pole Attendance: 2,236; Referee: Giorgos Bikas (Greece)

12 November International Friendly	United Arab Emirates	1–1	Malta	Abu Dhabi, United Arab Emirates
	Mubarak 26'	Report	Turner 53'	Stadium: Zayed Sports City Stadium; Attendance: 3,000; Referee: Ali Bujsaim (United Arab Emirates)

15 November International Friendly	United Arab Emirates	0–0	Malta	Abu Dhabi, United Arab Emirates
		Report		Stadium: Zayed Sports City Stadium; Attendance: 4,000; Referee: Salem Binhazim Saeed (United Arab Emirates)

27 November International Friendly	Malta	0–2	Macedonia	Ta' Qali, Malta
		Report	Micevski 37'; Ćirić 88' (pen.)	Stadium: Ta' Qali National Stadium; Attendance: 450; Referee: Charles Agius (Malta)

18 December 1998 FIFA World Cup qualification	Malta	0–3	Spain	Ta' Qali, Malta
		Report	Guerrero 8', 26', 33'	Stadium: Ta' Qali National Stadium; Attendance: 3,200; Referee: Nikolai Levnikov (Russia)

=== 1997 ===
12 February 1998 FIFA World Cup qualification	Spain	4–0	Malta	Alicante, Spain
	Guardiola 25'; Alfonso 40', 47'; Pizzi 89'	Report		Stadium: Estadio José Rico Pérez; Attendance: 28,000; Referee: Stephen Lodge (England)

19 March International Friendly	Malta	1–4	Hungary	Ta' Qali, Malta
	Keresztúri 74' (o.g.)	Report	Urbán 18'; Halmai 40'; Orosz 66'; Plókai 88'	Stadium: Ta' Qali National Stadium; Attendance: 1,039; Referee: Robert Boggi (Italy)

31 March 1998 FIFA World Cup qualification	Malta	0–2	Slovakia	Ta' Qali, Malta
		Report	Jančula 38'; Tittel 90'	Stadium: Ta' Qali National Stadium; Attendance: 4,202; Referee: Marek Kowalczyk (Poland)

30 April 1998 FIFA World Cup qualification	Malta	1–2	Faroe Islands	Ta' Qali, Malta
	Sultana 8'	Report	Ø. Hansen 60'; T. Jónsson 89'	Stadium: Ta' Qali National Stadium; Attendance: 8,188; Referee: Dani Koren (Israel)

1 June International Friendly	Malta	2–3	Scotland	Ta' Qali, Malta
	Suda 17'; Sultana 57'	Report	Dailly 4'; Jackson 44', 81'	Stadium: Ta' Qali National Stadium; Attendance: 3,500; Referee: Stefano Braschi (Italy)

8 June 1998 FIFA World Cup qualification	Faroe Islands	2–1	Malta	Toftir, Faroe Islands
	Arge 7'; T. Jónsson 42'	Report	Agius 48'	Stadium: Svangaskarð; Attendance: 6,400; Referee: Richard O'Hanlon (Ireland)

6 August International Friendly	Hungary	3–0	Malta	Siófok, Hungary
	Kovács 47'; Sebők 57'; Lipcsei 90'	Report		Stadium: Bányász Stadion; Attendance: 5,646; Referee: Jacek Granat (Poland)

24 September 1998 FIFA World Cup qualification	Malta	0–1	Czech Republic	Ta' Qali, Malta
		Report	Bejbl 32'	Stadium: Ta' Qali National Stadium; Attendance: 1,622; Referee: Armand Ancion (Belgium)

11 October 1998 FIFA World Cup qualification	Malta	0–5	FR Yugoslavia	Ta' Qali, Malta
		Report	Milošević 8'; Mihajlović 24'; Savićević 44'; Mijatović 55'; Jugović 76'	Stadium: Ta' Qali National Stadium; Attendance: 1,107; Referee: Dermot Gallagher (England)

=== 1998 ===
6 February 1998 Rothmans Tournament	Malta	1–1	Albania	Ta' Qali, Malta
	Suda 2' (pen.)	Report	Shulku 84' (pen.)	Stadium: Ta' Qali National Stadium; Attendance: 3,000; Referee: Romāns Lajuks (Latvia)

8 February 1998 Rothmans Tournament	Malta	2–1	Latvia	Ta' Qali, Malta
	Busuttil 57'; Brincat 85'	Report	Pahars 68'	Stadium: Ta' Qali National Stadium; Attendance: 3,000; Referee: Otar Guntadze (Georgia)

10 February 1998 Rothmans Tournament	Malta	1–3	Georgia	Ta' Qali, Malta
	Magri Overend 56' (pen.)	Report	Kavelashvili 13', 75'; Jamarauli 71'	Stadium: Ta' Qali National Stadium; Attendance: 2,500; Referee: Bujar Pregia (Albania)

25 March International Friendly	Malta	0–2	Finland	Ta' Qali, Malta
		Report	Riihilahti 1'; Wiss 51'	Stadium: Ta' Qali National Stadium; Attendance: 2,500; Referee: Livio Bazzoli (Italy)

3 June International Friendly	Malta	0–3	Wales	Ta' Qali, Malta
		Report	Bellamy 25'; Hartson 67'; Pembridge 78' (pen.)	Stadium: Ta' Qali National Stadium; Attendance: 2,500; Referee: Pasquale Rodomonti (Italy)

2 September International Friendly	Malta	1–2	Germany	Ta' Qali, Malta
	Brincat 26'	Report	Debono 6' (o.g.); Paßlack 72'	Stadium: Ta' Qali National Stadium; Attendance: 8,109; Referee: Livio Bazzoli (Italy)

6 September UEFA Euro 2000 qualifying	Macedonia	4–0	Malta	Skopje, Macedonia
	Božinov 20', 47'; Šakiri 70', 76'	Report		Stadium: Gradski stadion Attendance: 4,000; Referee: Jan Wegereef (Netherlands)

10 October UEFA Euro 2000 qualifying	Malta	1–4	Croatia	Ta' Qali, Malta
	Suda 29' (pen.)	Report	Šimić 54'; Vugrinec 67', 74'; Šuker 82'	Stadium: Ta' Qali National Stadium; Attendance: 5,170; Referee: Bohdan Benedik (Slovakia)

14 October UEFA Euro 2000 qualifying	Republic of Ireland	5–0	Malta	Dublin, Ireland
	Robbie Keane 17', 19'; Roy Keane 54'; Quinn 62'; Breen 82'	Report		Stadium: Lansdowne Road; Attendance: 34,500; Referee: Roy Helge Olsen (Norway)

18 November UEFA Euro 2000 qualifying	Malta	1–2	Macedonia	Ta' Qali, Malta
	Sixsmith 69'	Report	Nikolovski 49'; Zaharievski 63'	Stadium: Ta' Qali National Stadium; Attendance: 4,671; Referee: Sergei Shmolik (Belarus)

=== 1999 ===
27 January International Friendly	Malta	2–1	Bosnia and Herzegovina	Ta' Qali, Malta
	Carabott 45'; Busuttil 85'	Report	Salihamidžić 29'	Stadium: Ta' Qali National Stadium; Attendance: 1,751; Referee: Marco Tura (San Marino)

3 February International Friendly	Malta	0–1	Poland	Ta' Qali, Malta
		Report	Kłos 90'	Stadium: Ta' Qali National Stadium; Attendance: 300; Referee: Alfredo Trentalange (Italy)

10 February UEFA Euro 2000 qualifying	Malta	0–3	FR Yugoslavia	Ta' Qali, Malta
		Report	Nađ 22', 55'; Milošević 90+1'	Stadium: Ta' Qali National Stadium; Attendance: 5,167; Referee: Pascal Garibian (France)

10 March International Friendly	Malta	0–2	Moldova	Ta' Qali, Malta
		Report	Epureanu 74'; Suharev 87'	Stadium: Ta' Qali National Stadium; Attendance: 350; Referee: Roland Beck (Liechtenstein)

28 April International Friendly	Malta	1–2	Iceland	Ta' Qali, Malta
	Cutajar 44'	Report	Guðjónsson 37'; Daðason 54'	Stadium: Ta' Qali National Stadium; Attendance: 216; Referee: Marco Tura (San Marino)

8 June UEFA Euro 2000 qualifying	FR Yugoslavia	4–1	Malta	Thessaloniki, Greece
	Mijatović 34'; Milošević 48', 90'; Kovačević 74'	Report	Saliba 6'	Stadium: Toumba Stadium (Note: The game was played at a neutral ground due to the Kosovo War.); Attendance: 2,000; Referee: Morgan Norman (Sweden)

21 August UEFA Euro 2000 qualifying	Croatia	2–1	Malta	Zagreb, Croatia
	Stanić 34'; Soldo 55'	Report	Carabott 60'	Stadium: Stadion Maksimir; Attendance: 20,000; Referee: Atanas Uzunov (Bulgaria)

8 September UEFA Euro 2000 qualifying	Malta	2–3	Republic of Ireland	Ta' Qali, Malta
	Said 61'; Carabott 68' (pen.)	Report	Keane 13'; Breen 20'; Staunton 72'	Stadium: Ta' Qali National Stadium; Attendance: 8,122; Referee: Sorin Corpodean (Romania)

24 November International Friendly	Lebanon	0–0	Malta	Beirut, Lebanon
		Report		Stadium: Municipal Stadium; Attendance: 2,000; Referee: Jamil Taleb Ramadan (Lebanon)

15 December International Friendly	Malta	1–0 (Note: The match was abandoned in the 83rd minute following fighting between players.)	Lebanon	Ta' Qali, Malta
	Carabott 78' (pen.)	Report		Stadium: Ta' Qali National Stadium; Attendance: 443; Referee: Marco Tura (San Marino)
