= 1996 Malta International Football Tournament =

Tournament details
- Host country: Malta
- Dates: 7–11 February
- Teams: 4
- Venue(s): 1 (in 1 host city)

Final positions
- Champions: Russia (1st title)
- Runners-up: Slovenia
- Third place: Iceland
- Fourth place: Malta

Tournament statistics
- Matches played: 6
- Goals scored: 22 (3.67 per match)
- Attendance: 11,480 (1,913 per match)
- Top scorer(s): (Slovenia) Sašo Udovič (5 goals)

The 1996 Malta International Football Tournament (known as the Rothmans Tournament for sponsorship reasons) was the eighth edition of the Malta International Tournament. The competition was played between 7 and 11 February, with games hosted at the National Stadium in Ta' Qali.

== Matches ==
Pos	Team	Pld	W	D	L	GF	GA	GD	Pts
1	Russia (C)	3	3	0	0	8	1	+7	9
2	Slovenia	3	1	1	1	8	4	+4	4
3	Iceland	3	1	0	2	5	11	−6	3
4	Malta (H)	3	0	1	2	1	6	−5	1

Source: RSSSF
(C) Champions; (H) Hosts
7 February 1996

Malta	0–2	Russia
	Report	Karpin 26'; Kiriakov 61'

National Stadium, Ta' Qali
Attendance: 1,800
Referee: Milan Mitrović (Slovenia)

7 February 1996

Iceland	1–7	Slovenia
Þórðarson 40'	Report	Udovič 42', 48', 57', 69', 74'; Florijančič 79'; Šiljak 83'

National Stadium, Ta' Qali
Attendance: 450
Referee: Lawrence Sammut (Malta)

9 February 1996

Iceland	0–3	Russia
	Report	Kanchelskis 12'; Karpin 63', 65'

National Stadium, Ta' Qali
Attendance: 140
Referee: Alfred Micallef (Malta)

9 February 1996

Malta	0–0	Slovenia
	Report

National Stadium, Ta' Qali
Attendance: 500
Referee: Guðmundur Maríasson (Iceland)

11 February 1996

Russia	3–1	Slovenia
Simutenkov 13', 73'; Alenichev 18'	Report	Gliha 80' (pen.)

National Stadium, Ta' Qali
Attendance: 4,000
Referee: Charles Agius (Malta)

11 February 1996

Malta	1–4	Iceland
Zahra 69'	Report	Þórðarson 7'; Gunnlaugsson 27'; Grétarsson 44'; Guðjohnsen 45'

National Stadium, Ta' Qali
Attendance: 4,300
Referee: Sergei Khusainov (Russia)

== Winner ==
1996 Malta International Football Tournament

Russia
First title

== Statistics ==
=== Goalscorers ===
There were 22 goals scored in 6 matches, for an average of 3.67 goals per match.

5 goals

- (Slovenia) Sašo Udovič

3 goals

- (Russia) Valeri Karpin

2 goals

- (Russia) Igor Simutenkov
- (Iceland) Ólafur Þórðarson

1 goal

- (Russia) Dmitri Alenichev
- (Russia) Andrei Kanchelskis
- (Russia) Sergei Kiriakov
- (Slovenia) Matjaž Florijančič
- (Slovenia) Primož Gliha
- (Slovenia) Ermin Šiljak
- (Iceland) Arnar Grétarsson
- (Iceland) Arnór Guðjohnsen
- (Iceland) Bjarki Gunnlaugsson
- (Malta) Antoine Zahra

Source: EU-Football

== See also ==
China Cup
Cyprus International Football Tournament
