= UEFA Euro 1988 qualifying Group 2 =

Football tournament qualification stage

Standings and results for Group 2 of the UEFA Euro 1988 qualifying tournament.

Group 2 consisted of Italy, Malta, Portugal, Sweden and Switzerland. Group winners were Italy, who finished three points clear of second-placed Sweden.

== Final table ==
Pos	Team	Pld	W	D	L	GF	GA	GD	Pts	Qualification	(Italy)	(Sweden)	(Portugal)	(Switzerland)	(Malta)
1	Italy	8	6	1	1	16	4	+12	13	Qualify for final tournament	—	2–1	3–0	3–2	5–0
2	Sweden	8	4	2	2	12	5	+7	10		1–0	—	0–1	2–0	1–0
3	Portugal	8	2	4	2	6	8	−2	8		0–1	1–1	—	0–0	2–2
4	Switzerland	8	1	5	2	9	9	0	7		0–0	1–1	1–1	—	4–1
5	Malta	8	0	2	6	4	21	−17	2		0–2	0–5	0–1	1–1	—

Source: UEFA
Rules for classification: Qualification tiebreakers

== Results ==
24 September 1986

Sweden	2–0	Switzerland
Ekström 20', 80'	(Report)

Råsunda Stadium, Solna
Attendance: 27,751
Referee: Vojtĕch Christov (Czechoslovakia)

12 October 1986

Portugal	1–1	Sweden
Coelho 66'	(Report)	Strömberg 52'

Estádio Nacional, Lisbon
Attendance: 19,775
Referee: Keith Hackett (England)

29 October 1986

Switzerland	1–1	Portugal
Bregy 6'	(Report)	Manuel Fernandes 85'

Wankdorf Stadium, Bern
Attendance: 8,500
Referee: Siegfried Kirschen (East Germany)

15 November 1986

Italy	3–2	Switzerland
Donadoni 1'; Altobelli 52', 85' (pen.)	(Details)	Brigger 31'; Weber 88'

Stadio Giuseppe Meazza, Milan
Attendance: 67,422
Referee: Aron Schmidhuber (West Germany)

16 November 1986

Malta	0–5	Sweden
	(Details)	Hysén 38'; Magnusson 67'; Fredriksson 69'; Ekström 82', 84'

Ta' Qali National Stadium, Ta' Qali
Attendance: 8,311
Referee: Lajos Hartmann (Hungary)

6 December 1986

Malta	0–2	Italy
	(Details)	Ferri 12'; Altobelli 19'

Ta' Qali National Stadium, Ta' Qali
Attendance: 13,191
Referee: Ihsan Türe (Turkey)

24 January 1987

Italy	5–0	Malta
Bagni 4'; Bergomi 9'; Altobelli 24', 35'; Vialli 45'	(Details)

Stadio Atleti Azzurri d'Italia, Bergamo
Attendance: 32,370
Referee: Stephanos Hadjistefanou (Cyprus)

14 February 1987

Portugal	0–1	Italy
	(Details)	Altobelli 40'

Estádio Nacional, Lisbon
Attendance: 14,195
Referee: Michel Vautrot (France)

29 March 1987

Portugal	2–2	Malta
Jorge Plácido 11', 77'	(Details)	Mizzi 23' (pen.); Busuttil 68'

Estádio dos Barreiros, Funchal
Attendance: 12,000
Referee: John Kinsella (Republic of Ireland)

15 April 1987

Switzerland	4–1	Malta
Egli 5'; Bregy 16', 38' (pen.), 87' (pen.)	(Details)	Busuttil 71'

Stade de la Maladière, Neuchâtel
Attendance: 5,400
Referee: Roger Philippi (Luxembourg)

24 May 1987

Sweden	1–0	Malta
Ekström 13'

Nya Ullevi, Gothenburg
Attendance: 16,165
Referee: Kaj Natri (Finland)

3 June 1987

Sweden	1–0	Italy
Larsson 25'	(Details)

Råsunda Stadium, Solna
Attendance: 40,070
Referee: Dieter Pauly (West Germany)

17 June 1987

Switzerland	1–1	Sweden
Halter 57'		Ekström 60'

Stade Olympique de la Pontaise, Lausanne
Attendance: 7,000
Referee: Gerard Geurds (Netherlands)

23 September 1987

Sweden	0–1	Portugal
	(Details)	Gomes 34'

Råsunda Stadium, Solna
Attendance: 28,916
Referee: Valeri Butenko (Soviet Union)

17 October 1987

Switzerland	0–0	Italy

Wankdorf Stadium, Bern
Attendance: 29,397
Referee: Marcel Van Langenhove (Belgium)

11 November 1987

Portugal	0–0	Switzerland

Estádio das Antas, Porto
Attendance: 3,632
Referee: Lajos Nemeth (Hungary)

14 November 1987

Italy	2–1	Sweden
Vialli 27', 45+2'	(Details)	Larsson 38'

Stadio San Paolo, Naples
Attendance: 59,046
Referee: Adolf Prokop (East Germany)

15 November 1987

Malta	1–1	Switzerland
Busuttil 89'		Zwicker 2'

Ta' Qali National Stadium, Ta' Qali
Attendance: 7,112
Referee: Georgios Koukoulakis (Greece)

5 December 1987

Italy	3–0	Portugal
Vialli 8'; Giannini 87'; De Agostini 89'	(Details)

Stadio Giuseppe Meazza, Milan
Attendance: 13,524
Referee: Jan Keizer (Netherlands)

20 December 1987

Malta	0–1	Portugal
		Frederico 74'

Ta' Qali National Stadium, Ta' Qali
Attendance: 5,651
Referee: Hubert Forstinger (Austria)

== Goalscorers ==
There were 47 goals scored in 20 matches, for an average of 2.35 goals per match.

6 goals

- (Italy) Alessandro Altobelli
- (Sweden) Johnny Ekström

4 goals

- (Italy) Gianluca Vialli
- (Switzerland) Georges Bregy

3 goals

- (Malta) Carmel Busuttil

2 goals

- (Portugal) Jorge Plácido
- (Sweden) Peter Larsson

1 goal

- (Italy) Salvatore Bagni
- (Italy) Giuseppe Bergomi
- (Italy) Luigi De Agostini
- (Italy) Roberto Donadoni
- (Italy) Riccardo Ferri
- (Italy) Giuseppe Giannini
- (Malta) Dennis Mizzi
- (Portugal) José Coelho
- (Portugal) Manuel Fernandes
- (Portugal) Fernando Gomes
- (Portugal) Frederico Rosa
- (Sweden) Stig Fredriksson
- (Sweden) Glenn Hysén
- (Sweden) Mats Magnusson
- (Sweden) Glenn Strömberg
- (Switzerland) Jean-Paul Brigger
- (Switzerland) André Egli
- (Switzerland) Andy Halter
- (Switzerland) Martin Weber
- (Switzerland) Hans-Peter Zwicker
