= 1988 Malta International Football Tournament =

Tournament details
- Host country: Malta
- Dates: 7–13 February
- Teams: 4
- Venue(s): 1 (in 1 host city)

Final positions
- Champions: East Germany (1st title)
- Runners-up: Malta
- Third place: Finland
- Fourth place: Tunisia

Tournament statistics
- Matches played: 6
- Goals scored: 16 (2.67 per match)
- Top scorer(s): (East Germany) Damian Halata (Malta) Carmel Busuttil (Finland) Mika Lipponen (3 goals)

The 1988 Malta International Football Tournament (known as the Rothmans Tournament for sponsorship reasons) was the third edition of the Malta International Tournament. The competition was played between 8 and 12 February, with games hosted at the National Stadium in Ta' Qali.

== Matches ==
Pos	Team	Pld	W	D	L	GF	GA	GD	Pts
1	East Germany Olympic (C)	3	3	0	0	8	0	+8	9
2	Malta (H)	3	2	0	1	4	2	+2	6
3	Finland	3	1	0	2	3	4	−1	3
4	Tunisia	3	0	0	3	1	10	−9	0

Source: RSSSF
(C) Champions; (H) Hosts
7 February 1988
15:15 (+1:00)

Malta	2–0	Finland
Busuttil 32', 35'	Report

National Stadium, Ta' Qali
Attendance: 4,940
Referee: Edgar Azzopardi (Malta)

Note: Carmel Busuttil set the goal-scoring record for Malta (8 goals)

7 February 1988

East Germany Olympic	5–0	Tunisia
Bredow 12'; Peschke 36'; Halata 39'; Lindner 52'; Mothes 82'	Report

National Stadium, Ta' Qali
Attendance: 5,000

10 February 1988
13:15 (UTC+1:00)

Malta	2–1	Tunisia
Vella 59'; Busuttil 71'	Report	Maâloul 60'

National Stadium, Ta' Qali
Attendance: 4,000
Referee: Victor Mintoff (Malta)

10 February 1988

East Germany Olympic	2–0	Finland
Halata 51'; März 70'	Report

National Stadium, Ta' Qali

13 February 1988
13:15 (UTC+1:00)

Finland	3–0	Tunisia
Lipponen 35', 42', 74'	Report

National Stadium, Ta' Qali
Attendance: 1,000
Referee: Patrick Fenech (Malta)

13 February 1988
15:15 (UTC+1:00)

East Germany Olympic	1–0	Malta
Halata 43'	Report

National Stadium, Ta' Qali
Attendance: 3,000

== Winner ==
1988 Malta International Football Tournament

East Germany Olympic
First title

== Statistics ==
=== Goalscorers ===
There were 16 goals scored in 6 matches, for an average of 2.67 goals per match.

3 goals

- (East Germany) Damian Halata
- (Finland) Mika Lipponen
- (Malta) Carmel Busuttil

1 goal

- (East Germany) Harald Mothes
- (East Germany) Heiko Peschke
- (East Germany) Heiko März
- (East Germany) Matthias Lindner
- (East Germany) Uwe Bredow
- (Malta) Ray Vella
- (Tunisia) Nabil Maâloul

Source: EU-Football

== See also ==
- China Cup
- Cyprus International Football Tournament
