= 1995–96 Maltese Premier League =

Maltese Premier League
- Season: 1995–96
- Champions: Sliema Wanderers (23rd title)
- Relegated: St. Patrick; Żurrieq
- UEFA Cup: Sliema Wanderers; Floriana
- UEFA Cup Winners' Cup: Valletta
- UEFA Intertoto Cup: Hibernians
- Matches played: 90
- Goals scored: 301 (3.34 per match)
- Top goalscorer: Aldrin Muscat (18)

The 1995–96 Maltese Premier League was the 16th season of the Maltese Premier League, and the 81st season of top-tier football in Malta. It was contested by 10 teams, and Sliema Wanderers F.C. won the championship.

== Teams ==
Locations of the 1995–96 Maltese Premier League teams

== League standings ==
Pos	Team	Pld	W	D	L	GF	GA	GD	Pts	Qualification
1	Sliema Wanderers F.C. (C)	18	15	1	2	55	16	+39	46	Qualification for the UEFA Cup
2	Valletta F.C.	18	13	3	2	49	11	+38	42	Qualification for the UEFA Cup Winners' Cup (Note: Valletta qualified for the Cup Winners' Cup as Maltese FA Trophy Winners)
3	Floriana F.C.	18	11	4	3	32	12	+20	37	Qualification for the UEFA Cup
4	Hibernians F.C.	18	9	6	3	35	18	+17	33	Qualification for the UEFA Intertoto Cup
5	Hamrun Spartans F.C.	18	8	5	5	29	21	+8	29	
6	Birkirkara Luxol	18	6	3	9	23	26	−3	21	
7	Naxxar Lions	18	6	3	9	22	33	−11	21	
8	Rabat Ajax F.C.	18	4	2	12	28	50	−22	14	
9	Żabbar St. Patrick F.C. (R)	18	3	0	15	15	52	−37	9	Relegation
10	Żurrieq F.C. (R)	18	1	1	16	13	62	−49	4	Relegation

Source: rsssf.com
(C) Champions; (R) Relegated

== Results ==
Home \ Away	BKR	FRN	HIB	ĦMR	NXR	RBT	SLM	STP	VLT	ŻRQ
Birkirkara Luxol	—	0–0	1–3	2–1	1–2	0–2	1–4	5–0	0–1	2–0
Floriana	1–0	—	1–1	1–1	3–1	2–1	1–0	2–0	0–0	5–0
Hibernians	1–1	2–1	—	0–0	1–0	4–1	0–2	2–0	1–1	6–0
Ħamrun Spartans	1–0	0–3	1–1	—	3–0	3–0	1–1	1–2	2–1	3–2
Naxxar Lions	0–1	0–2	1–1	1–1	—	3–2	1–2	2–3	0–3	2–1
Rabat Ajax	2–2	1–2	1–4	2–4	0–2	—	1–5	4–2	1–3	2–2
Sliema Wanderers	3–1	1–0	4–2	2–1	7–1	7–2	—	3–0	1–2	1–0
St. Patrick	0–1	2–3	0–4	0–2	1–2	1–4	0–3	—	0–3	1–2
Valletta	4–0	2–1	3–0	1–0	1–1	4–0	1–2	8–0	—	7–0
Żurrieq	1–5	0–4	0–2	2–4	0–3	0–2	1–7	1–2	1–4	—

Legend: Blue = home team win; Yellow = draw; Red = away team win.

== Top goalscorers ==
Rank	Player	Club	Goals
1	(Malta) Aldrin Muscat	Sliema Wanderers	18
2	(Federal Republic of Yugoslavia) Danilo Dončić	Valletta	17
3	(Malta) Hubert Suda	Sliema Wanderers	11
4	(Malta) Stefan Sultana	Ħamrun Spartans	10
4	(Malta) Henry Pullicino	Naxxar Lions	10
6	(Malta) Paul Zammit	Rabat Ajax	9
6	(Malta) Antoine Zahra	Birkirkara Luxol	9
6	(Malta) John Stivala	Birkirkara Luxol	9
10	(Republic of Ireland) Brian Crawley	Hibernians	8
10	(Malta) Gilbert Agius	Valletta	8
