= Degiorgio =

Degiorgio is a family name of multiple origins. It is not known when the name became hereditary.

The surname “Degiorgio” translated into English means “The Farmer”.

== Royal lineage ==
The Bagrationi Royal Dynasty reigned over Georgia. Their ascendancy lasted from the early Middle Ages until the early 19th century.

The origin of the Bagrationi dynasty is disputed, as well as the time when they first appeared on Georgian soil. The history of the dynasty is inextricably bound with that of Georgia. They began their rule, in the early 9th century, as presiding princes in historic southwestern Georgia and the adjacent Georgian marshlands that had been reconquered from Arabs. Subsequently they restored, in 888, the Georgian kingdom, which prospered from the 11th to the 13th century, bringing several regional polities under its control. Several members of royal families from Europe, Russia and Asia married with Georgian royalty.

This period of time, particularly the reigns of David IV (1089–1125) and his great granddaughter Tamar (1184–1213), is celebrated as a “golden age” in Georgian history. The era featured empire, military exploits and cultural achievements. After the fragmentation of their unified feudal state in the late 15th century, the branches of the Bagrationi house ruled the three breakaway Georgian kingdoms – Kartli, Kakheti, and Imereti – until Russian annexation in the early 19th century. The dynasty persisted in exile as an Imperial Russian noble family until the 1917 February Revolution. The establishment of Soviet rule in Georgia in 1921 forced some members of the family to accept demoted status and loss of property in Georgia; others relocated to Western Europe. Some returned after Georgian independence in 1991.

Records in Malta have been found, dating as far back as the 1700s, where De Giorgio forefathers landed on the Island of Malta, and set up a successful trading business.

== People with the surname ==
- Kirk Degiorgio (born 1967 or 1968), British techno producer and DJ
- Michael Degiorgio (born 1962), Maltese footballer
- Vincent DeGiorgio, Canadian DJ and record producer
- H.G. Duke Reno Degiorgio, Born Malta, M.Eng.
- Johnny DeGiorgio, (born 1992) Follower of Christ.
- Joseph DeGiorgio, (born 1970) Queens, NY Entrepreneur
- Stepheno DeGiorgio, (born 1992) Palermo, Sicily. Siciliano singer
- Danica de Giorgio, Australian journalist
