= 1990 Malta International Football Tournament =

Tournament details
- Host country: Malta
- Dates: 4–10 February
- Teams: 3
- Venue(s): 1 (in 1 host city)

Final positions
- Champions: Norway (1st title)
- Runners-up: South Korea
- Third place: Malta

Tournament statistics
- Matches played: 3
- Goals scored: 10 (3.33 per match)
- Top scorer(s): Ten players (1 goal each)

The 1990 Malta International Football Tournament (known as the Rothmans Tournament for sponsorship reasons) was the fifth edition of the Malta International Tournament. The competition was played between 4 and 10 February, with games hosted at the National Stadium in Ta' Qali.

== Matches ==
Pos	Team	Pld	W	D	L	GF	GA	GD	Pts
1	Norway (C)	2	1	1	0	4	3	+1	4
2	South Korea	2	1	0	1	4	4	0	3
3	Malta (H)	2	0	1	1	2	3	−1	1

Source: RSSSF
(C) Champions; (H) Hosts
4 February 1990
15:00 (+1:00)

Norway	3–2	South Korea
Berg 53'; Skammelsrud 85'; Tangen 89'	Report; Report	Sun-hong 38'; Sang-yoon 68'

National Stadium, Ta' Qali
Attendance: 1,500
Referee: Charles Agius (Malta)

7 February 1990

Malta	1–1	Norway
Scerri 38'	Report	Fjørtoft 22'

National Stadium, Ta' Qali
Attendance: 1,893
Referee: Edgar Azzopardi (Malta)

10 February 1990
15:00 (UTC+1:00)

Malta	1–2	South Korea
Laferla 83'	Report; Report	Jong-chul 39'; Hwangbo Kwan 75'

National Stadium, Ta' Qali
Attendance: 3,544
Referee: Thorodd Presberg Norway

== Winner ==
1990 Malta International Football Tournament

Norway
First title

== Statistics ==
=== Goalscorers ===
There were 10 goals scored in 3 matches, for an average of 3.33 goals per match.

1 goal

- (Norway) Jan Åge Fjørtoft
- (Norway) Ørjan Berg
- (Norway) Bent Skammelsrud
- (Norway) Rune Tangen
- (South Korea) Hwang Sun-hong
- (South Korea) Lee Sang-yoon
- (South Korea) Baek Jong-chul
- (South Korea) Hwangbo Kwan
- (Malta) Chris Laferla
- (Malta) Charles Scerri

Source: EU-Football

== See also ==
- China Cup
- Cyprus International Football Tournament
