= Bjarki Gunnlaugsson =

Icelandic footballer

Personal information
- Full name: Bjarki Bergmann Gunnlaugsson
- Date of birth: 6 March 1973 (age 53)
- Place of birth: Akranes, Iceland
- Height: 5 ft 9 in (1.75 m)
- Position: Midfielder

Youth career
- 1988–1990: ÍA

Senior career*
Years	Team	Apps	(Gls)
1989–1992	ÍA	43	(11)
1992–1994	Feyenoord	0	(0)
1994–1995	1. FC Nürnberg	27	(5)
1995	ÍA	7	(3)
1995–1997	SV Waldhof Mannheim	39	(9)
1997–1998	Molde	18	(6)
1998	Brann	7	(1)
1999	KR	16	(11)
1999–2002	Preston North End	45	(2)
2002	Deiglan	1	(0)
2002	ÍA	7	(7)
2003–2005	KR	25	(1)
2006	ÍA	11	(2)
2007–2008	FH	13	(0)
2008–2009	ÍA	13	(0)
2009	Valur	1	(0)
2010–2012	FH	38	(0)
Total		311	(58)

International career
1987–1988	Iceland U17	8	(3)
1989–1990	Iceland U19	9	(3)
1992	Iceland U21	4	(1)
1993–2000	Iceland	27	(7)

Managerial career
- 2006: ÍA
- 2008–2009: ÍA
- * Club domestic league appearances and goals

Bjarki Bergmann Gunnlaugsson (born 6 March 1973) is a Icelandic former professional footballer who played as a midfielder.

== Club career ==
After a period in English football at Preston North End, Bjarki joined up with his twin brother Arnar and they played together at KR Reykjavík when they came back home. The played with the team for several years, then joined their childhood club, ÍA Akranes, in 2006. They became the managers of the club, when the team manager, Ólafur Þórðarson, left the club because of a horrible start in the division. The brothers saved the club from relegation, but the chairman of the club hired manager Guðjón Þórðarson to control the club. Then, the brothers left ÍA Akranes to join the Icelandic champions, FH Hafnarfjörður.

In July 2008, the brothers left FH amicably when Guðjón Þórðarson had been fired from ÍA, and again took the reins of their old club as player-managers.

In May 2010, it was announced that Bjarki had joined his former club and Icelandic champions FH on free transfer. He signed a one-year contract. This transfer meant that for the first time he and his twin brother were on opposing sides in the same league, as Arnar played for Haukar at the time. They had previously played together with five different clubs; ÍA (multiple times, and also co-managed the team twice), 1. FC Nürnberg, KR, FH and Valur. Additionally, they were both contracted to Feyenoord at the same time, although only Arnar featured for the team.

== International career ==
Bjarki made his debut for the Iceland national team in an October 1993 friendly match against Tunisia, coming on as a substitute for Arnar Grétarsson. He has been capped 27 times for Iceland, scoring seven goals. He scored in his last international match, a February 2000 friendly match against the Faroe Islands.

== Personal life ==
Bjarki was born in Akranes. He is the twin brother of Arnar Gunnlaugsson who was also an Icelandic international, and the older brother of Garðar Gunnlaugsson who played for the national team as well. He established a football agency in 2012 and has worked as an agent since then.

== Honours ==
Preston North End

- Football League Second Division: 1999–2000
