= George Mallia =

Maltese footballer

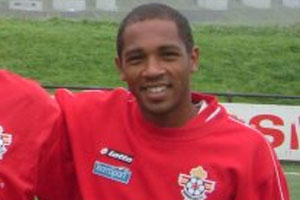

Personal information
- Date of birth: 10 October 1978 (age 48)
- Place of birth: Sliema, Malta
- Position: Midfielder

Senior career*
Years	Team	Apps	(Gls)
1995–1998	Sliema Wanderers	44	(11)
1998–2002	Floriana	84	(9)
2002–2010	Birkirkara	171	(24)
2010–2011	Qormi	19	(3)

International career^{‡}
	Malta U21	12	(3)
1997–2011	Malta	62	(6)
- * Club domestic league appearances and goals as of 22 July 2009 ‡ National team caps and goals as of 24 January 2010

George Mallia (born 10 October 1978 in Sliema, Malta) is a retired professional footballer who last played for Maltese Premier League side Qormi FC as a midfielder.

== Playing career ==
George made his debut with Sliema Wanderers in the Maltese Premier League in the season 1995–1996. In the season 1998-1999 he joined Floriana. In 2002-2003 he joined Birkirkara and became one of the best players on the team. At the end of the 2009–2010 season with Birkirkara FC (where he won the Maltese Premier League for the second time with Birkirkara), he signed a deal with Qormi FC. George is a national team regular player and has also played at all levels with the Youth National Team.

== International career ==
Mallia made his international debut in 1997, while he was still playing for Sliema. He earned himself 62 caps, and has scored a total of 6 goals for the Malta national football team. He is remembered for his fantastic goal against Moldova, where the game ended 1-1 (away), as well as an away goal against Denmark. In an August 2005 friendly against Northern Ireland Mallia had an injury time penalty saved by Maik Taylor; had he scored it would have given Malta an unlikely win.

Season	Team	Matches	Goals
1995–1996	Sliema Wanderers	4	0
1996–1997	Sliema Wanderers	21	8
1997–1998	Sliema Wanderers	19	3
1998–1999	Floriana	17	3
1999–2000	Floriana	16	2
2000–2001	Floriana	25	2
2001–2002	Floriana	26	2
2002–2003	Birkirkara	26	8
2003–2004	Birkirkara	17	3
2004–2005	Birkirkara	25	2
2005–2006	Birkirkara	22	4
2006–2007	Birkirkara	27	3
2007–2008	Birkirkara	2	0
2008–2009	Birkirkara		4
2009–2010	Birkirkara		4
2010–2011	Qormi	19	3

== International goals ==
Scores and results list Malta's goal tally first.

No	Date	Venue	Opponent	Score	Result	Competition
1.	8 February 2000	Ta' Qali National Stadium, Ta' Qali, Malta	Andorra	1–0	1–1	Rothmans Tournament
2.	6 June 2001	Parken Stadium, Copenhagen, Denmark	Denmark	1–0	1–2	2002 World Cup qualifier
3	13 February 2002	Ta' Qali National Stadium, Ta' Qali, Malta	Moldova	1–0	3–0	Rothmans Tournament
4	13 February 2002	Ta' Qali National Stadium, Ta' Qali, Malta	Moldova	2–0	3–0	Rothmans Tournament
5.	24 March 2007	Zimbru Stadium, Chișinău, Moldova	Moldova	1–0	1–1	Euro 2008 qualifier
