= 1998 Malta International Football Tournament =

Tournament details
- Host country: Malta
- Dates: 6–10 February
- Teams: 4
- Venue: 1 (in 1 host city)

Final positions
- Champions: Georgia (1st title)
- Runners-up: Malta
- Third place: Albania
- Fourth place: Latvia

Tournament statistics
- Matches played: 6
- Goals scored: 19 (3.17 per match)
- Attendance: 14,750 (2,458 per match)
- Top scorer(s): (Georgia (country)) Gocha Jamarauli (Georgia (country)) Mikhail Kavelashvili (Latvia) Marians Pahars (3 goals)

The 1998 Malta International Football Tournament (known as the Rothmans Tournament for sponsorship reasons) was the ninth edition of the Malta International Tournament. The competition was played between 6 and 10 February, with games hosted at the National Stadium in Ta' Qali.

== Matches ==
Pos	Team	Pld	W	D	L	GF	GA	GD	Pts
1	Georgia (C)	3	3	0	0	8	2	+6	9
2	Malta (H)	3	1	1	1	4	5	−1	4
3	Albania	3	0	2	1	3	6	−3	2
4	Latvia	3	0	1	2	4	6	−2	1

Source: RSSSF
(C) Champions; (H) Hosts
6 February 1998

Georgia	2–1	Latvia
Jamarauli 50', 71'	Report	Bleidelis 86' (pen.)

National Stadium, Ta' Qali
Attendance: 3,000
Referee: Alfred Micallef (Malta)

6 February 1998

Malta	1–1	Albania
Suda 2' (pen.)	Report	Shulku 84' (pen.)

National Stadium, Ta' Qali
Attendance: 3,000
Referee: Romāns Lajuks (Latvia)

8 February 1998

Albania	0–3	Georgia
	Report	Ketsbaia 19'; Kavelashvili 29'; Iashvili 71'

National Stadium, Ta' Qali
Attendance: 750
Referee: Charles Agius (Malta)

8 February 1998

Malta	2–1	Latvia
Busuttil 57'; Brincat 85'	Report	Pahars 68'

National Stadium, Ta' Qali
Attendance: 3,000
Referee: Otar Guntadze (Georgia)

10 February 1998

Albania	2–2	Latvia
Kola 44' (pen.), 46'	Report	Pahars 35', 53'

National Stadium, Ta' Qali
Attendance: 2,500
Referee: Lawrence Sammut (Malta)

10 February 1998

Malta	1–3	Georgia
Magri Overend 56' (pen.)	Report	Kavelashvili 13', 75'; Jamarauli 71'

National Stadium, Ta' Qali
Attendance: 2,500
Referee: Bujar Pregia (Albania)

== Winner ==
1998 Malta Tournament winner

Georgia
First title

== Statistics ==
=== Goalscorers ===
There were 19 goals scored in 6 matches, for an average of 3.17 goals per match.

3 goals

- (Georgia (country)) Gocha Jamarauli
- (Georgia (country)) Mikhail Kavelashvili
- (Latvia) Marians Pahars

2 goals

- (Albania) Bledar Kola

1 goal

- (Georgia (country)) Aleksandr Iashvili
- (Georgia (country)) Temuri Ketsbaia
- (Malta) Joe Brincat
- (Malta) Carmel Busuttil
- (Malta) Jonathan Magri Overend
- (Malta) Hubert Suda
- (Albania) Ilir Shulku
- (Latvia) Imants Bleidelis

Source: RSSSF

== See also ==
China Cup
Cyprus International Football Tournament
