= Hubert Suda =

Maltese footballer

Personal information
- Full name: Hubert Suda
- Date of birth: 20 September 1969 (age 57)
- Place of birth: Sliema, Malta
- Position: Striker

Senior career*
Years	Team	Apps	(Gls)
1986–1997	Sliema Wanderers	137	(72)
1997–1998	Valletta	27	(11)
1998–2002	Birkirkara	56	(16)
Total		220	(99)

International career
1988–2001	Malta	71	(8)
- * Club domestic league appearances and goals as of 15 July 2010

Hubert Suda (born 20 September 1969) is a Maltese retired international footballer.

== Club career ==
Suda played the major part of his career for homewtown club Sliema Wanderers, winning 4 league titles and a domestic cup with them. He was voted Maltese player of the month 6 times and also played for Valletta and Birkirkara.

== International career ==
Suda made his debut for Malta in an October 1988 friendly match away against Israel and earned a total of 71 caps, scoring 8 goals. His final international was a November 2001 friendly against Canada.

=== International goals ===
No.	Date	Venue	Opponent	Score	Result	Competition
1.	25 November 1990	Ta'Qali, Malta	Finland	1–0	1–1	UEFA Euro 1992 qualifying
2.	7 May 1991	Ta'Qali, Malta	Iceland	1–3	1–4	Friendly
3.	7 June 1991	Seoul, South Korea	Indonesia	1–0	3–0	1991 President's Cup
4.	9 June 1991	Daejeon, South Korea	Egypt	2–4	2–5	1991 President's Cup
5.	11 June 1991	Gwangju, South Korea	South Korea	1–1	1–1	1991 President's Cup
6.	1 June 1997	Ta'Qali, Malta	Scotland	1–1	2–3	Friendly
7.	6 February 1998	Ta'Qali, Malta	Albania	1–0	1–1	1998 Malta International Football Tournament
8.	10 October 1998	Ta'Qali, Malta	Croatia	1–0	1–4	UEFA Euro 2000 qualifying

== Honours ==
- Maltese Premier League: 4

Sliema Wanderers

1989, 1996

Valletta

1998

Birkirkara

2000

- FA Trophy: 1

Sliema Wanderers

1990

== Personal life ==
Suda's son Jurgen also played in the Maltese top tier, for Valletta.
