= Joe Sant Fournier =

Maltese footballer

Personal information
- Full name: Joseph Sant Fournier
- Date of birth: 27 January 1971 (age 55)
- Place of birth: Malta
- Position: Midfielder

Senior career*
Years	Team	Apps	(Gls)
1989–1991	Naxxar Lions	27	(0)
1991–1992	Birkirkara	10	(1)
1992–1999	Sliema Wanderers	128	(18)
1999–2000	Naxxar Lions	21	(2)
2000–2001	Marsa	14	(0)
2001–2004	Naxxar Lions	30	(2)
2005–2006	St. Andrews	10	(1)
Total		240	(24)

International career
1992-1998	Malta	21	(1)
- * Club domestic league appearances and goals

Joe Sant Fournier (born 27 January 1971 in Malta) is a Maltese retired footballer.

== Club career ==
During his career, Sant Fournier had three different spells with Naxxar Lions, but played the most seasons for Sliema Wanderers as a midfielder.

== International career ==
Sant Fournier made his debut for Malta in a May 1992 friendly match against Latvia, coming on as a 61st-minute substitute for Richard Buhagiar , and earned a total of 21 caps, scoring 1 goal. His final international was a September 1998 friendly against Germany.

=== International goals ===
#	Date	Venue	Opponent	Score	Result	Competition
.	16 August 1996	National Stadium, Ta' Qali, Malta	Albania	2–1	2–1	Friendly

== Honours ==
Sliema Wanderers

- Maltese Premier League: 1996
- Maltese Super Cup: 1996

Marsa

- Maltese First Division: 2001
