= 1991 President's Cup International Football Tournament =

1991 President's Cup
Tournament details
- Host country: South Korea
- Dates: 7–16 June
- Teams: 8

Final positions
- Champions: South Korea (11th title)
- Runners-up: Egypt

Tournament statistics
- Matches played: 15
- Goals scored: 43 (2.87 per match)
- Top scorer: (South Korea) Ha Seok-ju (4 goals)
- Best player: (South Korea) Ha Seok-ju

The 1993 President's Cup International Football Tournament (Korean: 제19회 대통령배 국제축구대회) was the 19th competition of Korea Cup. It was held from 7 to 16 June 1993. South Korea won the tournament and their 11th title by defeating Egypt 2–0 in the final.

== Group stage ==
=== Group A ===
Team	Pld	W	D	L	GF	GA	GD	Pts
Egypt	3	2	1	0	11	2	+9	5
South Korea	3	1	2	0	4	1	+3	4
Malta	3	1	1	1	6	6	0	3
Indonesia	3	0	0	3	0	12	–12	0

7 June 1991
18:30 UTC+9

South Korea	0–0	Egypt
	Report

Seoul Olympic Stadium, Seoul

7 June 1991

Malta	3–0	Indonesia
Suda 44'; Scerri 76'; Degiorgio 79'	Report

Seoul Olympic Stadium, Seoul

9 June 1991

Egypt	5–2	Malta
El-Sagheer 6'; Ramzy 21'; Yassin 54'; Abdelghani 60'; H. Hassan 84'	Report	Brincat 38'; Suda 64'

Daejeon Hanbat Stadium, Daejeon

9 June 1991
15:50 UTC+9

South Korea	3–0	Indonesia
Ko Jeong-woon 52'; Kim Joo-sung 55'; Ha Seok-ju 82' (pen.)	Report

Daejeon Hanbat Stadium, Daejeon

11 June 1991

Egypt	6–0	Indonesia
Tolba 9'; Mansour 16'; H. Hassan 18'; Farouk 46', 60'; Azima 73'	Report

Daejeon Hanbat Stadium, Daejeon

11 June 1991
17:00 UTC+9

South Korea	1–1	Malta
Ha Seok-ju 73'	Report	Suda 89'

Gwangju Mudeung Stadium, Gwangju

=== Group B ===
Team	Pld	W	D	L	GF	GA	GD	Pts
Australia	3	3	0	0	8	3	+5	6
Soviet Union B	3	1	1	1	3	3	0	3
South Korea B	3	1	0	2	2	4	–2	2
United States Universiade	3	0	1	2	4	7	–3	1

8 June 1991

Soviet Union B	1–2	Australia
Yudin 25'	Report	Zelic 42'; Gray 53'

Suwon Sports Complex, Suwon

8 June 1991

South Korea B	2–1	United States Universiade
Shin Hong-gi 70'; Yoon Sang-chul 85'	Report	DiCuollo 53'

Suwon Sports Complex, Suwon

10 June 1991

Australia	4–2	United States Universiade
Gray 19'; Vidmar 25'; Duraković 38'; Arnold 76'	Report	Moore 88' (pen.); Jones 90'

Daegu Civic Stadium, Daegu

10 June 1991

South Korea B	0–1	Soviet Union B
	Report	Kudrytsky 13'

Daegu Civic Stadium, Daegu

12 June 1991

South Korea B	0–2	Australia
	Report	Arnold 1'; Brown 27'

Pohang Steel Yard, Pohang

12 June 1991

Soviet Union B	1–1	United States Universiade
Bahmut 65'	Report	DiCuollo 49'

Pohang Steel Yard, Pohang

== Knockout stage ==
=== Bracket ===
Semi-finals
14 June – Seoul
Australia	0 (3)
South Korea (p)	0 (4)
14 June – Seoul
Egypt	2
Soviet Union B	1

Final
16 June – Seoul
South Korea	2
Egypt	0

=== Semi-finals ===
14 June 1991
17:00 UTC+9

Australia	0–0 (a.e.t.)	South Korea
	Report
Penalties
Wade (penalty scored); Arnold (penalty missed); Blagojevic (penalty scored); Milosevic (penalty scored); Vidmar (penalty missed)	3–4	(penalty scored) Ha Seok-ju; (penalty scored) Choi Dae-shik; (penalty missed) Yoon Deok-yeo; (penalty scored) Ko Jeong-woon; (penalty scored) Choi Kang-hee

Seoul Olympic Stadium, Seoul

14 June 1991

Egypt	2–1	Soviet Union B
Ramzy 15'; H. Hassan 30'	Report	Rakhimov 43'

Seoul Olympic Stadium, Seoul

=== Final ===
16 June 1991
15:00 UTC+9

South Korea	2–0	Egypt
Ha Seok-ju 41', 89' (pen.)	Report

Seoul Olympic Stadium, Seoul

== See also ==
- Korea Cup
- South Korea national football team results
