= Joe Brincat (footballer) =

Maltese former international footballer

Personal information
- Full name: Joseph Brincat
- Date of birth: 5 March 1970 (age 56)
- Place of birth: Ħamrun, Malta
- Height: 1.74 m (5 ft 8 1/2 in)
- Positions: Attacking midfielder; left winger

Senior career*
Years	Team	Apps	(Gls)
1986–1994	Ħamrun Spartans	105	(25)
1995–1998	Floriana	47	(23)
1998–2002	Birkirkara	94	(48)
2002–2006	Sliema Wanderers	83	(12)
2006–2007	Floriana	4	(0)

International career
1988–2004	Malta	103	(6)

Managerial career
- 2009–2010: San Gwann
- * Club domestic league appearances and goals

Joseph Brincat (born 5 March 1970) is a Maltese former international footballer who earned a total of 103 caps for the Maltese national team, scoring six goals. He played for many clubs including Birkirkara FC, Sliema Wanderers, and Floriana.

Joe Brincat is a Hamrun Spartans product and started his career with the club at the age of 17 in the championship winning team of that same year. With the senior squad of Hamrun, Joe Brincat won the MFA Player of the year whilst donning the Hamrun Spartans shirt, while he was a key player in major trophies won by the Hamrun squad at the time, which include the Premier League three times, four times the FA trophy, 5 times the Maltese Super Cup and once the Euro Cup..

== International career ==
Brincat played 103 times (including 2 unofficial games) for the Maltese national football team, scoring five goals. He made his debut way back in October 1987 when the national team, then under coach Gencho Dobrev, played a friendly against England B who won 2–0. He made his last appearance for the Maltese national team in 2004 in a friendly tournament match against Moldova. Brincat is in third place for the all-time list of appearances for the Maltese national team.

== Personal life ==
He is married to Rita and has two daughters - Beverly (born 1995) and Mariah (born 1999).

== Career statistics ==
=== International goals ===
#	Date	Venue	Opponent	Score	Result	Competition
1.	9 June 1991	Sports Complex, Daejeon, South Korea	Egypt	5–2	Loss	President's Cup 1991
2.	27 November 1991	Ta' Qali National Stadium, Attard, Malta	Libya	2–0	Win	Friendly
3.	7 November 1993	Stade El Menzah, Tunis, Tunisia	Gabon	1–2	Win	Friendly
4.	30 April 1997	Ta' Qali National Stadium, Attard, Malta	Faroe Islands	1–2	Loss	1998 FIFA World Cup qual.
5.	8 February 1998	Ta' Qali National Stadium, Attard, Malta	Latvia	2–1	Win	Rothmans Tournament 1998
6.	2 September 1998	Ta' Qali National Stadium, Attard, Malta	Germany	1–2	Loss	Friendly
Correct as of 22 February 2017

== Honours ==
Ħamrun Spartans

- Maltese Premier League: 3

1987, 1988, 1991

- FA Trophy: 3

1987, 1988, 1992

Birkirkara

- Maltese Premier League: 1

2000

- FA Trophy: 1

2002

Sliema Wanderers

- Maltese Premier League: 3

2003, 2004, 2005

- FA Trophy: 1

2004

== See also ==
- List of men's footballers with 100 or more international caps
