= 1989 Malta International Football Tournament =

Tournament details
- Host country: Malta
- Dates: 8–12 February
- Teams: 4
- Venue: 1 (in 1 host city)

Final positions
- Champions: Algeria (1st title)
- Runners-up: Denmark
- Third place: Finland
- Fourth place: Malta

Tournament statistics
- Matches played: 6
- Goals scored: 5 (0.83 per match)
- Top scorer(s): Five players (1 goal each)

The 1989 Malta International Football Tournament (known as the Rothmans Tournament for sponsorship reasons) was the fourth edition of the Malta International Tournament. The competition was played between 8 and 12 February, with games hosted at the National Stadium in Ta' Qali.

== Matches ==
Pos	Team	Pld	W	D	L	GF	GA	GD	Pts
1	Algeria (C)	3	2	1	0	3	0	+3	7
2	Denmark	3	1	2	0	2	0	+2	5
3	Finland	3	0	2	1	0	2	−2	2
4	Malta (H)	3	0	1	2	0	3	−3	1

Source: RSSSF
(C) Champions; (H) Hosts
8 February 1989
13:15 (+1:00)

Algeria	2–0	Finland
Benabou 59'; Adlane 83'	Report; Report

National Stadium, Ta' Qali
Attendance: 1,500
Referee: Victor Mintoff (Malta)

8 February 1989
15:15 (+1:00)

Malta	0–2	Denmark
	Report	Elstrup 53' (pen.); Larsen 83'

National Stadium, Ta' Qali
Attendance: 2,587
Referee: Mohamed Mimoun (Algeria)

10 February 1989
13:15 (UTC+1:00)

Denmark	0–0	Finland
	Report

National Stadium, Ta' Qali
Attendance: 1,530
Referee: Charles Agius (Malta)

10 February 1989
15:15 (UTC+1:00)

Malta	0–1	Algeria
	Report	Zorgane (?)

National Stadium, Ta' Qali
Attendance: 2,497
Referee: Esa Palsi (Finland)

12 February 1989
13:15 (UTC+1:00)

Algeria	0–0	Denmark
	Report

National Stadium, Ta' Qali
Attendance: 2,500
Referee: Edgar Azzopardi (Malta)

12 February 1989
15:15 (UTC+1:00)

Malta	0–0	Finland
	Report

National Stadium, Ta' Qali
Attendance: 2,798
Referee: Kurt Sørensen (Denmark)

== Winner ==
1989 Malta International Football Tournament

Algeria
First title

== Statistics ==
=== Goalscorers ===
There were 5 goals scored in 6 matches, for an average of 0.833 goals per match.

1 goal

- (Algeria) Malik Zorgane
- (Algeria) Mohamed Benabou
- (Algeria) Haji Adlane
- (Denmark) Lars Elstrup
- (Denmark) Henrik Larsen

Source: EU-Football

== See also ==
- China Cup
- Cyprus International Football Tournament
