= Harald Mothes =

German footballer (1956–2026)

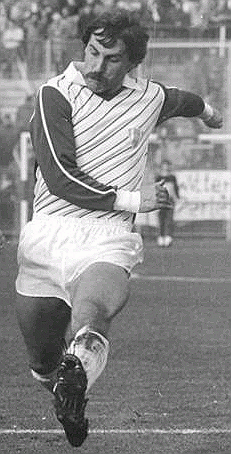
- Mothes in 1986

Personal information
- Date of birth: 28 November 1956
- Place of birth: Lößnitz, East Germany
- Date of death: 8 May 2026 (aged 69)
- Position: Forward

Youth career
- –1972: BSG Motor Löbnitz
- 1972–1975: Wismut Aue

Senior career*
Years	Team	Apps	(Gls)
1974–1976	Wismut Aue II	23	(5)
1975–1990	Wismut Aue	303	(88)
1976–1978	→ Vorwärts Plauen	24	(13)
1990–1991	TSV Ampfing		

International career
1984	East Germany	1	(0)
- * Club domestic league appearances and goals

Harald Mothes (28 November 1956 – 8 May 2026) was a German footballer who played as a forward or midfielder.

Mothes played over 300 games for Erzgebirge Aue in the DDR-Oberliga. He also won one cap for East Germany.

Mothes died unexpectedly on 8 May 2026, at the age of 69.
