= 1994 FIFA World Cup qualification – UEFA Group 1 =

The qualification matches for Group 1 of the European zone (UEFA) of the 1994 FIFA World Cup qualification tournament took place between August 1992 and November 1993. The teams competed on a home-and-away basis with the winner and runner-up claiming 2 of the 12 spots in the final tournament allocated to the European zone. The group consisted of Estonia, Italy, Malta, Portugal, Scotland, and Switzerland.

== Standings ==
Pos	Team	Pld	W	D	L	GF	GA	GD	Pts	Qualification	Italy national football team	Switzerland national football team	Portugal national football team	Scotland national football team	Malta national football team	Estonia national football team
1	Italy	10	7	2	1	22	7	+15	16	Qualification to 1994 FIFA World Cup	—	2–2	1–0	3–1	6–1	2–0
2	Switzerland	10	6	3	1	23	6	+17	15	Qualification to 1994 FIFA World Cup	1–0	—	1–1	3–1	3–0	4–0
3	Portugal	10	6	2	2	18	5	+13	14		1–3	1–0	—	5–0	4–0	3–0
4	Scotland	10	4	3	3	14	13	+1	11		0–0	1–1	0–0	—	3–0	3–1
5	Malta	10	1	1	8	3	23	−20	3		1–2	0–2	0–1	0–2	—	0–0
6	Estonia	10	0	1	9	1	27	−26	1		0–3	0–6	0–2	0–3	0–1	—

=== Results ===
16 August 1992

Estonia	0–6	Switzerland
	Report	Chapuisat 23', 68'; Bregy 29'; Knup 46', 66'; Sforza 84'

Kadrioru, Tallinn
Attendance: 2,412
Referee: Michał Listkiewicz (Poland)

9 September 1992

Switzerland	3–1	Scotland
Knup 2', 71'; Bregy 81'	Report	McCoist 13'

Wankdorf, Bern
Attendance: 7,662
Referee: Mario van der Ende (Netherlands)

14 October 1992

Italy	2–2	Switzerland
R. Baggio 83'; Eranio 90+1'	Report	Ohrel 17'; Chapuisat 21'

Stadio Sant'Elia, Cagliari
Attendance: 26,216
Referee: Peter Mikkelsen (Denmark)
14 October 1992

Scotland	0–0	Portugal
	Report

Ibrox Park, Glasgow
Attendance: 22,583
Referee: Hubert Forstinger (Austria)

25 October 1992

Malta	0–0	Estonia
	Report

Ta' Qali National Stadium, Ta' Qali
Attendance: 1,456
Referee: Oğuz Sarvan (Turkey)

18 November 1992

Scotland	0–0	Italy
	Report

Ibrox Park, Glasgow
Attendance: 33,029
Referee: Aron Schmidhuber (Germany)
18 November 1992

Switzerland	3–0	Malta
Bickel 2'; Sforza 44'; Chapuisat 89'	Report

Wankdorf, Bern
Attendance: 7,644
Referee: Sergei Khusainov (Russia)

19 December 1992

Malta	1–2	Italy
Gregory 85'	Report	Vialli 59'; Signori 62'

Ta' Qali National Stadium, Ta' Qali
Attendance: 14,191
Referee: Guy Goethals (Belgium)

24 January 1993

Malta	0–1	Portugal
	Report	Rui Aguas 58'

Ta' Qali National Stadium, Ta' Qali
Attendance: 11,500
Referee: David Elleray (England)

17 February 1993

Scotland	3–0	Malta
McCoist 15', 68'; Nevin 84'	Report

Ibrox Park, Glasgow
Attendance: 35,490
Referee: Ilkka Koho (Finland)

24 February 1993

Portugal	1–3	Italy
Couto 56'	Report	R. Baggio 2'; Casiraghi 25'; D. Baggio 73'

Estádio das Antas, Porto
Attendance: 30,761
Referee: Bo Karlsson (Sweden)

24 March 1993

Italy	6–1	Malta
D. Baggio 19'; Signori 38'; Vierchowod 48'; Mancini 58', 89'; Maldini 73'	Report	Busuttil 68' (pen.)

La Favorita, Palermo
Attendance: 33,720
Referee: Vassilios Nikakis (Greece)

31 March 1993

Switzerland	1–1	Portugal
Chapuisat 39'	Report	Semedo 44'

Wankdorf, Bern
Attendance: 29,095
Referee: Kim Milton Nielsen (Denmark)

14 April 1993

Italy	2–0	Estonia
R. Baggio 22'; Signori 87'	Report

Stadio Nereo Rocco, Trieste
Attendance: 22,279
Referee: Sándor Piller (Hungary)

17 April 1993

Malta	0–2	Switzerland
	Report	Ohrel 31'; Türkyilmaz 89'

Ta' Qali National Stadium, Ta' Qali
Attendance: 7,837
Referee: Ion Crăciunescu (Romania)

28 April 1993

Portugal	5–0	Scotland
Rui Barros 5', 70'; Cadete 45', 72'; Futre 67'	Report

Estádio da Luz, Lisbon
Attendance: 28,000
Referee: Sándor Puhl (Hungary)

1 May 1993

Switzerland	1–0	Italy
Hottiger 56'	Report

Wankdorf, Bern
Attendance: 32,000
Referee: Antonio Martin Navarrete (Spain)

12 May 1993

Estonia	0–1	Malta
	Report	Laferla 16'

Kadrioru, Tallinn
Attendance: 4,500
Referee: Markus Merk (Germany)

19 May 1993

Estonia	0–3	Scotland
	Report	Gallacher 43'; Collins 59'; Booth 73'

Kadrioru, Tallinn
Attendance: 1,800
Referee: Tore Hollung (Norway)

2 June 1993

Scotland	3–1	Estonia
McClair 18'; Nevin 27', 72' (pen.)	Report	Bragin 57'

Pittodrie, Aberdeen
Attendance: 14,307
Referee: Atanas Uzunov (Bulgaria)

19 June 1993

Portugal	4–0	Malta
Nogueira 1'; Rui Costa 8'; João Pinto 23'; Cadete 85'	Report

Estádio do Bessa, Porto
Attendance: 7,000
Referee: Jiří Ulrich (Czech Republic)

5 September 1993

Estonia	0–2	Portugal
	Report	Rui Costa 61'; Folha 74'

Kadrioru, Tallinn
Attendance: 2,790
Referee: Ilkka Koho (Finland)

8 September 1993

Scotland	1–1	Switzerland
Collins 50'	Report	Bregy 70' (pen.)

Pittodrie, Aberdeen
Attendance: 21,500
Referee: Joël Quiniou (France)

22 September 1993

Estonia	0–3	Italy
	Report	R. Baggio 20' (pen.), 73'; Mancini 59'

Kadrioru, Tallinn
Attendance: 5,350
Referee: Jan Damgaard (Denmark)

13 October 1993

Portugal	1–0	Switzerland
João Pinto 8'	Report

Estádio das Antas, Porto
Attendance: 55,000
Referee: Hellmut Krug (Germany)
13 October 1993

Italy	3–1	Scotland
Donadoni 3'; Casiraghi 16'; Eranio 80'	Report	Gallacher 18'

Stadio Olimpico, Rome
Attendance: 61,178
Referee: Ion Crăciunescu (Romania)

10 November 1993

Portugal	3–0	Estonia
Futre 2'; Oceano 37' (pen.); Rui Águas 86'	Report

Estádio da Luz, Lisbon
Attendance: 105,000
Referee: Eric Blareau (Belgium)

17 November 1993

Italy	1–0	Portugal
D. Baggio 83'	Report

Stadio Giuseppe Meazza, Milan
Attendance: 71,513
Referee: Ryszard Wójcik (Poland)
17 November 1993

Malta	0–2	Scotland
	Report	McKinlay 15'; Hendry 74'

Ta' Qali National Stadium, Ta' Qali
Attendance: 8,900
Referee: Periklis Vassilakis (Greece)
17 November 1993

Switzerland	4–0	Estonia
Knup 32'; Bregy 34'; Ohrel 45'; Chapuisat 61'	Report

Hardturm, Zurich
Attendance: 21,000
Referee: Zoran Petrović (FR Yugoslavia)

== Goalscorers ==
6 goals

- (Switzerland) Stéphane Chapuisat

5 goals

- (Italy) Roberto Baggio
- (Switzerland) Adrian Knup

4 goals

- (Switzerland) Georges Bregy

3 goals

- (Italy) Dino Baggio
- (Italy) Roberto Mancini
- (Italy) Giuseppe Signori
- (Portugal) Jorge Cadete
- (Scotland) Ally McCoist
- (Scotland) Pat Nevin
- (Switzerland) Christophe Ohrel

2 goals

- (Italy) Pierluigi Casiraghi
- (Italy) Stefano Eranio
- (Portugal) Rui Águas
- (Portugal) Rui Barros
- (Portugal) Rui Costa
- (Portugal) Paulo Futre
- (Portugal) João Pinto
- (Scotland) John Collins
- (Scotland) Kevin Gallacher
- (Switzerland) Ciriaco Sforza

1 goal

- (Estonia) Sergei Bragin
- (Italy) Roberto Donadoni
- (Italy) Paolo Maldini
- (Italy) Gianluca Vialli
- (Italy) Pietro Vierchowod
- (Malta) Carmel Busuttil
- (Malta) Martin Gregory
- (Malta) Kristian Laferla
- (Portugal) Fernando Couto
- (Portugal) António Folha
- (Portugal) António Nogueira
- (Portugal) Oceano
- (Portugal) José Orlando Semedo
- (Scotland) Scott Booth
- (Scotland) Colin Hendry
- (Scotland) Brian McClair
- (Scotland) Billy McKinlay
- (Switzerland) Thomas Bickel
- (Switzerland) Marc Hottiger
- (Switzerland) Kubilay Türkyilmaz
