= Georges Bregy =

Swiss footballer (born 1958)

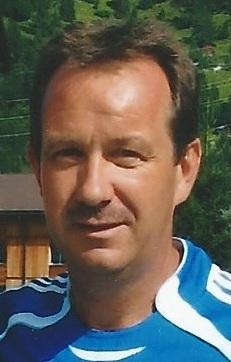

Personal information
- Full name: Georges Bregy
- Date of birth: 17 January 1958 (age 68)
- Place of birth: Raron, Switzerland
- Height: 1.75 m (5 ft 9 in)
- Positions: Striker; midfielder

Senior career*
Years	Team	Apps	(Gls)
1975–1979	Raron	125	(1)
1979–1984	Sion	150	(69)
1984–1986	Young Boys	58	(25)
1986–1988	Sion	50	(26)
1988	Martigny	13	(4)
1988–1990	Lausanne	66	(20)
1990–1994	Young Boys	134	(27)
Total		596	(172)

International career
1984–1994	Switzerland	54	(12)

Managerial career
- 1994–1995: Raron
- 1995–1998: Lausanne
- 1999–2001: Thun
- 2001–2003: Zürich
- 2004–2006: Stäfa
- * Club domestic league appearances and goals

Georges Bregy (born 17 January 1958) is a retired Swiss football striker and midfielder.

He was capped 54 times and scored 12 goals for the Swiss national team between 1984 and 1994. He played four games at the 1994 FIFA World Cup, and scored a free kick goal against the United States.

Bregy won the top goalscorer title in Switzerland in 1984, having scored 21 goals during the season.

He coached Raron, Lausanne, Thun, Zürich and Stäfa.

== International ==
International goals for Switzerland

Score and results list Switzerland's goal tally first.

#	Date	Venue	Opponent	Score	Result	Competition
1.	6 February 1985	Estadio Corregidora, Querétaro, Mexico	Mexico	2–0	2–1	Friendly
2.	17 April 1985	Wankdorf Stadium, Bern, Switzerland	Soviet Union	1–1	2–2	1986 FIFA World Cup qualification
3.	29 October 1986	Wankdorf Stadium, Bern, Switzerland	Portugal	1–0	1–1	UEFA Euro 1988 qualification
4.	15 April 1987	Stade de la Maladière, Neuchâtel, Switzerland	Malta	2–0	4–1	UEFA Euro 1988 qualification
5.	15 April 1987	Stade de la Maladière, Neuchâtel, Switzerland	Malta	3–0	4–1	UEFA Euro 1988 qualification
6.	15 April 1987	Stade de la Maladière, Neuchâtel, Switzerland	Malta	4–1	4–1	UEFA Euro 1988 qualification
7.	16 August 1992	Kadriorg Stadium, Tallinn, Estonia	Estonia	2–0	6–0	1994 FIFA World Cup qualification
8.	9 September 1992	Wankdorf Stadium, Bern, Switzerland	Scotland	3–1	3–1	1994 FIFA World Cup qualification
9.	8 September 1993	Pittodrie Stadium, Aberdeen, Scotland	Scotland	1–1	1–1	1994 FIFA World Cup qualification
10.	20 April 1994	Hardturm, Zürich, Switzerland	Czech Republic	2–0	3–0	Friendly
11.	18 June 1994	Pontiac Silverdome, Detroit, United States	United States	1–0	1–1	1994 FIFA World Cup
