= Dennis Mizzi =

Maltese footballer

Personal information
- Full name: Dennis Mizzi
- Date of birth: 19 May 1964 (age 62)
- Place of birth: Città Vittoriosa, Malta
- Position: Striker

Youth career
- Vittoriosa Stars FC

Senior career*
Years	Team	Apps	(Gls)
1981-1984	Vittoriosa Stars	34	(20)
1984-1985	Floriana	13	(1)
1985-1986	Hamrun Spartans	7	(1)
1986-1991	Żurrieq	52	(16)
1991-1997	Hamrun Spartans	61	(12)
1998	Naxxar Lions	3	(0)
Total		170	(50)

International career^{‡}
1984–1987	Malta	12	(2)
- * Club domestic league appearances and goals as of 14 February 2010 ‡ National team caps and goals as of 14 February 2010

Dennis Mizzi (born 19 May 1964 in Malta) was a professional footballer, during his career he played for Żurrieq, where he played as a striker. He was voted Malta Footballer of the Month in February 1987.

== International career ==
Mizzi made his debut for Malta in an October 1984 World Cup qualification match away against Czechoslovakia, coming on as a 78th-minute substitute for Charlie Muscat, and earned a total of 12 caps, scoring 2 goals. He also played in the UEFA Euro 1988 qualifying rounds and his final international was such a game against Portugal in December 1987.
