= Jonathan Magri Overend =

Maltese footballer

Personal information
- Full name: Jonathan Magri Overend
- Date of birth: 6 June 1970 (age 56)
- Place of birth: Sliema, Malta
- Position: Midfielder

Senior career*
Years	Team	Apps	(Gls)
1986–1995	Sliema Wanderers	97	(3)
1995–1996	Żurrieq	11	(1)
1996–2001	Birkirkara	123	(17)
2001–2007	Ħamrun Spartans	91	(0)
Total		322	(21)

International career
1998	Malta	5	(1)
- * Club domestic league appearances and goals

Jonathan Magri Overend (born 6 June 1970) is a Maltese international retired footballer. He played over 400 matches in all domestic competitions and as voted Malta Footballer of the Month in November 1997.

During his career he played for Sliema Wanderers(139), ŻurrieqFC (12), BirkirkaraFC(158) and Ħamrun Spartans FC (99), where he played as a central defender or midfielder. Retiring at 38, he switched to the national Futsal league, playing for 5 seasons, being finalist and runner up in 3 successive seasons. During this time he made 5 Futsal national team appearances, scoring 1 goal.

== International career ==
Magri Overend made his debut for Malta in a February 1998 friendly match against Albania and earned a total of 5 caps, scoring 1 goal. His final international was in September that same year, against Macedonia.

== Honours ==
- Maltese Premier League: 2

1989, 2000

- FA Trophy: 1

1990
