= Sigurður Grétarsson =

Icelandic footballer

Personal information
- Date of birth: 2 May 1962 (age 64)
- Place of birth: Iceland
- Height: 1.82 m (5 ft 11 1/2 in)
- Position: Striker

Senior career*
Years	Team	Apps	(Gls)
1979–1980	Breiðablik	34	(24)
1980–1981	FC 08 Homburg	16	(4)
1981–1983	Breiðablik	40	(21)
1983–1984	Tennis Borussia Berlin		
1984–1985	Iraklis	26	(10)
1985–1990	FC Luzern	123	(46)
1990–1993	Grasshopper	65	(5)
1996–1997	Valur	11	(2)
1998–2000	Breiðablik	31	(4)

International career
1980–1992	Iceland	46	(8)

Managerial career
- 1996–1997: Valur
- 1998–2001: Breiðablik
- * Club domestic league appearances and goals

Sigurður Grétarsson (born 2 May 1962) is an Icelandic former footballer who played as a striker. After retiring, he worked as a football manager.

He is the older brother of former international player Arnar Grétarsson.

== Club career ==
Sigurður started at Breiðablik and later became very successful in the Swiss League with Luzern and Grasshopper Zürich. He finished his playing career at his first club, Breiðablik, where he became player-manager.

== International career ==
He made his debut for Iceland in 1980 and went on to win 46 caps, scoring eight goals. He played his last international match in a June 1993 World Cup qualifier against Russia.
