= Malta International Football Tournament =

- Founded: 1986
- Abolished: 2008
- Region: Malta
- Teams: 4 (or 3)
- Most championships: Belarus; Malta (2 titles)
- 2008 Malta International Football Tournament

The Malta International Tournament was a biannual association football friendly competition for national teams, organised by the Malta Football Association that took place in Malta between 1986 and 2008. Initially, the tournament included the participation of football clubs, but starting from 1988 this was revamped to include only national A teams.

Usually played in February, the competition involved a single round-robin phase where each team played once against each other. Teams are ranked by points and at the end of the competition, the team with the most points is crowned champion. Up till 2004, the competition was sponsored by Rothmans and was known as the Rothmans Tournament for sponsorship reasons.

== Summary ==
Year	Winners	Runners-up	Third place	Fourth place	Top scorer(s)		Ref
1986	(Germany) 1. FC Kaiserslautern	(Soviet Union) Fakel Voronezh	Malta	(Sweden) Hammarby IF	Not known		
1987	(Germany) VfB Stuttgart	(Poland) Legia Warsaw	Malta		Not known		
1988	East Germany Olympic	Malta	Finland	Tunisia	(East Germany) Damian Halata (Malta) Carmel Busuttil (Finland) Mika Lipponen	3 goals	
1989	Algeria	Denmark	Finland	Malta	Five players	1 goal	
1990	Norway	South Korea	Malta		Ten players	1 goal	
1992	Malta	Norway U-21	Iceland		Not known		
1994	Slovenia	Georgia	Tunisia	Malta	(Slovenia) Primož Gliha	2 goals	
1996	Russia	Slovenia	Iceland	Malta	(Slovenia) Sašo Udovič	5 goals	
1998	Georgia	Malta	Albania	Latvia	(Georgia (country)) Gocha Jamarauli (Georgia (country)) Mikhail Kavelashvili (Latvia) Marians Pahars	3 goals	
2000	Albania	Malta	Andorra	Azerbaijan	(Malta) Gilbert Agius	2 goals	
2002	Malta	Lithuania	Jordan	Moldova	(Malta) George Mallia (Malta) Michael Mifsud (Moldova) Alexandru Golban	2 goals	
2004	Belarus U-23	Estonia	Malta	Moldova	(Malta) Etienne Barbara	2 goals	
2006	Moldova U-21	Georgia	Malta		(Moldova) Alexandru Zislis	2 goals	
2008	Belarus	Armenia	Iceland	Malta	(Armenia) Ara Hakobyan	2 goals	

== Malta Women's Tournament ==
Year	Winners	Runners-up	Third place	Fourth place	Top scorer(s)	
2021	Sweden	Slovakia	Austria	Malta	(Sweden) Fridolina Rolfö	2 goals
2022	Morocco	Malta	Moldova	Only three teams	9 different players	1 goal
2024	Belarus	Malta	Albania			

== All-time top goalscorers ==
Rank	Name	Team	Goals	Tournament(s)
1	(Slovenia) Sašo Udovič	Slovenia	5	1996(5)
2	(Georgia (country)) Mikhail Kavelashvili	Georgia	4	1994(1) and 1998(3)
3	(Malta) Carmel Busuttil	Malta	3	1988(3)
3	(Finland) Mika Lipponen	Finland	3	1988(3)
3	(East Germany) Damian Halata	East Germany Olympic	3	1988(3)
3	(Slovenia) Primož Gliha	Slovenia	3	1994(2) and 1996(1)
3	(Russia) Valeri Karpin	Russia	3	1996(3)
3	(Georgia (country)) Gocha Jamarauli	Georgia	3	1998(3)
3	(Latvia) Marians Pahars	Latvia	3	1998(3)
3	(Malta) Gilbert Agius	Malta	3	2000(2) and 2002(1)
3	(Malta) George Mallia	Malta	3	2000(1) and 2002(2)

== Hat-tricks ==
Malta International Football Tournament hat-tricks
#	Player	G	Time of goals	For	Result	Against	Tournament	Date	Ref
1.	Mika Lipponen	3	35', 42', 74'	Finland	3–0	Tunisia	1988 Malta Football Tournament	13 February 1988	
2.	Sašo Udovič	5	42', 48', 57', 69', 74'	Slovenia	7–1	Iceland	1996 Malta Football Tournament	7 February 1996	
