= Kristian Laferla =

Maltese footballer (born 1967)

Kris Laferla
Personal information
- Full name: Kristian Laferla
- Date of birth: 23 March 1967 (age 59)
- Place of birth: Swieqi, Malta
- Position: Midfielder

Youth career
- –1985: Luxol

Senior career*
Years	Team	Apps	(Gls)
1983–1985	Luxol St. Andrews	15	(0)
1985–1986	→ Valletta (loan)	13	(0)
1986–2003	Valletta	282	(46)
2003–2005	Sliema Wanderers	50	(0)

International career
1986–1998	Malta	65	(6)
- * Club domestic league appearances and goals as of 15 July 2010

Kris Laferla (born 23 March 1967) is a former Maltese footballer who played as a midfielder during his career.

== Club career ==
At the age of 16, Laferla got his senior team debut for St. Andrew's on 12 December 1983 in a 0–0 draw against Birżebbuġa St. Peter's. Following his exploits in the Third Division, Laferla joined Premier League side Valletta on loan for the 1985–86 season. He made his debut against Żurrieq on 1 September 1985, and his first goal arrived from the penalty spot in the match against Tarxien Rainbows on 6 September 1986. After joining permanently, he soon became a regular figure with Valletta, even becoming club captain. With the Citizens, Laferla won 25 honours, including six in the 2000–01 season, making him one of the most decorated players in Maltese football.

In December 2002, Laferla moved to Sliema Wanderers, making his debut in a 5–0 win over Marsa. He finished his career by playing over 500 games in the top-tier of Maltese football.

== International career ==
Laferla made his debut with the Maltese national team in the 0–5 defeat against Sweden. In total he made 65 appearances, scoring six goals in the process, including the winner against Estonia. Laferla also captained the national team on 16 occasions, amongst them being the game against Italy played in 1993 where he missed a penalty in the 1–2 defeat.

=== International goals ===
"Score" represents the score in the match after Laferla's goal.

No.	Date	Venue	Opponent	Score	Result	Competition
1	10 February 1990	National Stadium, Ta' Qali, Ta' Qali, Malta	South Korea	1–2	1–2	1990 Malta International Tournament
2	12 May 1993	Kadriorg Stadium, Tallinn, Estonia	Estonia	1–0	1–0	1994 FIFA World Cup qualification
3	30 March 1994	National Stadium, Ta' Qali, Ta' Qali, Malta	Slovakia	1–1	1–2	Friendly
4	19 April 1994	National Stadium, Ta' Qali, Ta' Qali, Malta	Azerbaijan	2–0	5–0	Friendly
5	16 August 1994	Tehelné pole, Bratislava, Slovakia	Slovakia	1–1	1–1	Friendly
6	6 September 1994	Bazaly, Ostrava, Czech Republic	Czech Republic	1–4	1–6	UEFA Euro 1996 qualification

== Personal life ==
Laferla, having retired from football, now owns a nightclub in Paceville. He is married, and has three children; Jessica, Matthew and Juliana.
