= Frederico Rosa =

Portuguese footballer (1957–2019)

Frederico
Personal information
- Full name: Frederico Nobre Rosa
- Date of birth: 6 April 1957
- Place of birth: Castro Verde, Portugal
- Date of death: 17 February 2019 (aged 61)
- Height: 1.80 m (5 ft 11 in)
- Position: Centre-back

Youth career
- 1972–1975: CUF

Senior career*
Years	Team	Apps	(Gls)
1975–1978	CUF	15	(0)
1978–1979	Barreirense	30	(2)
1979–1983	Benfica	40	(0)
1983–1991	Boavista	214	(16)
1991–1992	Vitória Guimarães	30	(1)
1992–1994	Estrela Amadora	55	(2)
1994–1995	Leixões	13	(0)
Total		397	(21)

International career
1985–1989	Portugal	18	(5)
- * Club domestic league appearances and goals

Frederico Nobre Rosa (6 April 1957 – 17 February 2019), known simply as Frederico, was a Portuguese professional footballer who played as a central defender.

== Club career ==
Frederico was born in Castro Verde, Baixo Alentejo. During his club career he played for CUF, Barreirense, Benfica (having to compete with the likes of Humberto Coelho – his idol – he featured solely as a backup), Boavista (his most steady period, with eight consecutive Primeira Liga seasons, nearly 300 official appearances and team captaincy), Vitória de Guimarães, Estrela da Amadora and Leixões.

Frederico retired in June 1995, at the age of 38.

== International career ==
Frederico won 18 caps for Portugal, being selected for the roster at the 1986 FIFA World Cup in Mexico. On 29 March 1989, he scored two of his five goals in a 6–0 friendly win against Angola at the Estádio José Alvalade and, the following month, added another in the 3–1 victory over Switzerland in the 1990 World Cup qualifying stage.

Frederico Rosa: International goals
No.	Date	Venue	Opponent	Score	Result	Competition
1	5 February 1986	Estádio Municipal de Portimão, Portimão, Portugal	Luxembourg	1–0	2–0	Friendly
2	20 December 1987	Ta' Qali National Stadium, Ta' Qali, Malta	Malta	0–1	0–1	Euro 1988 qualifying
3	29 March 1989	Estádio José Alvalade (1956), Lisbon, Portugal	Angola	2–0	6–0	Friendly
4	29 March 1989	Estádio José Alvalade (1956), Lisbon, Portugal	Angola	6–0	6–0	Friendly
5	26 April 1989	Estádio da Luz (1954), Lisbon, Portugal	Switzerland	2–0	3–1	1990 World Cup qualification

== Death ==
Frederico died on 17 February 2019 aged 61, of amyotrophic lateral sclerosis.

== Honours ==
Benfica

- Primeira Liga: 1980–81, 1982–83
- Taça de Portugal: 1979–80, 1980–81, 1982–83
- Supertaça Cândido de Oliveira: 1980
- UEFA Cup runner-up: 1982–83
