= Stefan Sultana =

Maltese footballer

Personal information
- Full name: Stefan Sultana
- Date of birth: 18 July 1968 (age 58)
- Place of birth: Ħamrun, Malta
- Height: 5 ft 11 in (1.80 m)
- Position: Striker

Senior career*
Years	Team	Apps	(Gls)
1983–1998	Ħamrun Spartans	216	(129)
1998–2002	Hibernians	69	(25)
2002–2009	Ħamrun Spartans	112	(41)
Total		397	(195)

International career^{‡}
	Malta U21	4	(1)
1991–2000	Malta	33	(4)

Managerial career
- 2009: Ħamrun Spartans (Team Manager)
- 2012–2018: Ħamrun Spartans
- * Club domestic league appearances and goals as of 16 January 2010 ‡ National team caps and goals as of 16 January 2010

Stefan Sultana (born 18 July 1968 in Ħamrun, Malta) is a retired professional footballer, who played the majority of his career for Ħamrun Spartans as a striker. He also had a three-year spell with Hibernians. Following the 2008–09 season he announced his retirement from football.

He is the all-time top scorer in the Maltese Premier League having scored 195 goals.

== Honours ==
Ħamrun Spartans

- Maltese Premier League: 1986–87, 1987–88, 1990–91
- Maltese FA Trophy: 1982–83, 1983–84, 1986–87, 1987–88, 1988–89, 1991–92

Hibernians

- Maltese Premier League: 2001–02

== Career statistics ==
=== International goals ===
No.	Date	Venue	Opponent	Score	Result	Competition
1	27 November 1991	Ta' Qali National Stadium, Attard, Malta	Libya	2–0	Win	Friendly
2	22 December 1991	Ta' Qali National Stadium, Attard, Malta	Greece	1–1	Draw	UEFA Euro 1992 qualification
3	30 April 1997	Ta' Qali National Stadium, Attard, Malta	Faroe Islands	1–2	Loss	1998 FIFA World Cup qualification
4	1 June 1997	Ta' Qali National Stadium, Attard, Malta	Scotland	2–3	Loss	Friendly
