= Jorge Plácido =

Portuguese footballer

Personal information
- Full name: Jorge Manuel Plácido Bravo da Costa
- Date of birth: 19 June 1964 (age 62)
- Place of birth: Luanda, Angola
- Height: 1.77 m (5 ft 9 1/2 in)
- Position: Forward

Youth career
- 1978–1981: Barreirense
- 1981–1982: Amora

Senior career*
Years	Team	Apps	(Gls)
1982–1983	Amora	27	(4)
1983–1985	Vitória Setúbal	52	(10)
1985–1987	Chaves	51	(12)
1987–1988	Porto	16	(1)
1988–1990	Racing Paris	27	(2)
1989	→ Sporting CP (loan)	16	(2)
1990–1991	Porto	4	(0)
1991–1992	Salgueiros	26	(1)
1992–1993	Créteil	20	(3)
1993–1997	US Lusitanos	80	(17)
1997–1998	Saint-Denis	14	(2)
1998–2001	US Lusitanos	60	(8)
2003–2004	Lobão		
Total		393	(62)

International career
1987–1989	Portugal	3	(2)

Managerial career
- 2008–2009: Benfica Luanda
- * Club domestic league appearances and goals

Jorge Manuel Plácido Bravo da Costa (born 19 June 1964), known as Plácido, is a Portuguese retired footballer who played as a forward.

He played for 11 clubs in a 19-year professional career, in both Portugal and France. He amassed Primeira Liga totals of 192 games and 30 goals over a decade, and was also a Portugal international.

== Club career ==
Born in Luanda, Portuguese Angola, Plácido made his professional and Primeira Liga debut aged 17, with lowly Amora FC. After showing promise at his following two clubs, Vitória F.C. and G.D. Chaves (with eight goals, he helped the latter to qualify for the UEFA Cup for the only time in its history) the 23-year-old signed for FC Porto, but failed to adjust grossly.

Plácido moved to the French Ligue 1 with Racing Club de France Football in summer 1988, but he failed to establish himself, mainly due to a serious injury. In the following transfer window he returned to Portugal after being loaned to Sporting CP, but was also used sparingly; he suffered relegation in his second season with Racing. A second spell at Porto in the 1990–91 campaign also proved unassuming, as he only appeared in four matches for the side, all from the bench.

After one more year in Portugal, at S.C. Salgueiros – where, in the 1991–92 UEFA Cup, he scored the only goal in the first leg of the first round against Zinedine Zidane's AS Cannes, but missed his attempt in the second in a penalty shootout loss – Plácido returned to France, continuing to play until the age of 37 in the country's second, third and fourth tiers in representation of US Créteil-Lusitanos, US Lusitanos and Saint-Denis FC.

== International career ==
Plácido earned three caps for Portugal, scoring twice. His arrival coincided with the defection of practically all of the members of the national team after the infamous Saltillo Affair at the 1986 FIFA World Cup.

On 29 March 1987, Plácido's most important moment in the international scene arrived as his brace helped to avoid a shock defeat in Madeira against Malta for the UEFA Euro 1988 qualifiers (2–2).

Jorge Plácido: International goals
No.	Date	Venue	Opponent	Score	Result	Competition
1	29 March 1987	Estádio dos Barreiros, Funchal, Portugal	Malta	1–0	2–2	Euro 1988 qualifying
2	29 March 1987	Estádio dos Barreiros, Funchal, Portugal	Malta	2–2	2–2	Euro 1988 qualifying

== Honours ==
Porto

- Primeira Liga: 1987–88
- Taça de Portugal: 1987–88, 1990–91
- European Super Cup: 1987
- Intercontinental Cup: 1987
