= Ray Vella =

Maltese association footballer

Personal information
- Full name: Raymond Vella
- Date of birth: 11 January 1959 (age 67)
- Place of birth: Marsa, Malta
- Position: Midfielder

Senior career*
Years	Team	Apps	(Gls)
1975–1985	Marsa	113	(14)
1985–1992	Ħamrun Spartans	103	(7)
1992–1994	Luxol St. Andrews	32	(4)
1994–1996	Birkirkara Luxol	19	(0)
Total		267	(25)

International career
1984–1994	Malta	67	(1)
- * Club domestic league appearances and goals

Raymond Vella (born 11 January 1959) is a Maltese former footballer who last played as a midfielder for St. Andrews.

== Early life ==
Vella was born in 1959 in Marsa, Malta.

== Career ==
Vella is nicknamed "Il-Mundu" and has been described as a "legend in Maltese football".

== Personal life ==
Vella has been married to Mariella Vella and is the son of Nazzareno Vella and Karmena Vella.
