= Charles Muscat =

Maltese footballer

Charlie Muscat
Personal information
- Full name: Charles Muscat
- Date of birth: 13 January 1963
- Place of birth: Birżebbuġa, Malta
- Date of death: 13 January 2011 (aged 48)
- Place of death: Malta
- Position: Striker

Senior career*
Years	Team	Apps	(Gls)
1979–1981	Birżebbuġa St. Peter's		
1981–1988	Żurrieq	72	(19)
1990–1991	St. Patrick		
1991–1993	Birżebbuġa St. Peter's		
1993–1995	St. Patrick	28	(5)
1995–1999	Birżebbuġa St. Peter's		

International career
1984–1985	Malta	5	(1)
1984	Malta IX	1	(1)
- * Club domestic league appearances and goals

Charlie Muscat (13 January 1963 – 13 January 2011) was a Maltese footballer.

== Club career ==
Nicknamed Il-Baħri, Muscat made his debut for third-tier Birżebbuġa St. Peter's in 1979 in a Division Three match against Attard. Most notably, Muscat played for Żurrieq on the Maltese top level, where he played as a striker. In the 1983/1984 season he became top goalscorer in the Maltese Football League. He later played for St. Patrick and again for Birżebbuġa St. Peter's.

== International career ==
Muscat made his debut for Malta on 23 May 1984 in a FIFA World Cup qualification match against Sweden. He earned a total of six caps (1 unofficial), scoring two goals. He has represented his country in 3 FIFA World Cup qualification matches.

== Honours ==
=== Żurrieq ===
- Maltese FA Trophy: 1

1985

- Maltese Player of the Year: 1

1983–84

- Maltese Football League Top Goalscorer: 1

1983–84
