= Michael Degiorgio =

Maltese association football player

Personal information
- Full name: Michael Degiorgio
- Date of birth: 15 November 1962 (age 63)
- Place of birth: Ħamrun, Malta
- Positions: Defender; midfielder

Youth career
- Ħamrun Spartans

Senior career*
Years	Team	Apps	(Gls)
1979–1993	Ħamrun Spartans	213	(32)
1993–1996	Naxxar Lions	47	(8)
1996–1997	Ħamrun Spartans	24	(2)
1997–1999	Naxxar Lions	51	(3)
1999–2000	Lija Athletic	17	(0)
2000–2001	Marsaxlokk	17	(1)
2001–2003	Ħamrun Spartans	8	(0)
Total		377	(46)

International career^{‡}
1981–1993	Malta	78	(4)

Managerial career
- 2000–2001: Marsaxlokk
- 2004–2005: Ħamrun Spartans
- 2012–: Fgura
- * Club domestic league appearances and goals as of 21 October 2008 ‡ National team caps and goals as of 21 October 2008

Michael Degiorgio (born 15 November 1962) is a Maltese former professional footballer.

Degiorgio played as a midfielder until the end of his career, when he switched to a central defender.

Degiorgio started his career with Hamrun Spartans and then also played for Naxxar Lions, Lija Athletic and Marsaxlokk. Degiorgio is now managing Fgura.

== Early life ==
Degiorgio was born on 15 November 1962 in Pietà. A product of amateur club Ħamrun Liberty, he started his playing career in the MAFA League.

== Ħamrun Spartans ==
Degiorgio was soon promoted to the Ħamrun Spartans . On 13 October 1979 he substituted Tonio Pace in a league game against Żebbuġ Rangers F.C.

On 10 November 1979 Degiorgio played his first full league game in a 0–0 draw against Floriana. Between 1982 and 1993, the Spartans, with Degiorgia won four championships, six FA Trophy winners' medals, and 20 major trophies.

Degiorgio played for the Spartans against Ballymena United, of Ireland. Ħamrun won both legs 1-0 and 2–1 to reach the second round of the Cup Winners' Cup. In the Champions Cup against Dundee United, he played in all 18 matches in Europe, 10 in the Champions Cup and eight in the Cup Winners' Cup.

In 1989–90, he was named MFA player of the year.

== National team ==
On 4 April 1981 Degiorgio earn his first international cap in a national team game against East Germany . Malta lost 1-2 but Degiorgio's performance earned him a regular place in the National XI.

By his own admission, Degiorgio's best international match was in 1985 against Portugal. The national team lost 3–2, but Degiorgio scored one goal.

== Later career ==
In 1993 Ħamrun transferred Degiorgio to the Naxxar Lions. He then help his new club gain promotion to the Premier Division in Malta. In 1996–97, he returned briefly to Ħamrun but the next year went back to Naxxar for two seasons.

In 1999 to 2000, Degiorgio joined Lija Athletic in the First Division and the next season he went to Marsaxlokk. In 2001–02, Degiorgio returned to Ħamrun. However, a successful protest against his eligibility forced him to stop after playing only one game in the Premier League. The next season he played six matches as a substitute before deciding to retire.

== Legacy ==
Degiorgio was also the first player to be included in the newly established professional scheme for national team players. It was a singular honour for the young midfielder, which continued to enhance his reputation as one of the best Maltese footballers of the modern era.

In a career spanning 23 years, Degiorgio rarely missed a game. Injuries hardly affected him. It was only towards the end of his career that he started to miss matches.

By the end of his career, Degiorgio had played 77 times for Malta.

== Career statistics ==
=== International goals ===
#	Date	Venue	Opponent	Score	Result	Competition
1.	22 June 1981	Daegu Civic Stadium, Daegu, South Korea	Thailand	1–0	2–0	President's Cup 1981
2.	12 October 1985	Estádio da Luz, Lisbon, Portugal	Portugal	2–2	2–3	1986 FIFA World Cup qualifying
3.	28 May 1990	Ta' Qali National Stadium, Attard, Malta	Scotland	1–1	1–2	Friendly
4.	7 June 1991	Seoul Olympic Stadium, Seoul, South Korea	Indonesia	3–0	3–0	President's Cup 1991
Correct as of 22 February 2017
