= 1988–89 Maltese Premier League =

Maltese Premier League
- Season: 1988–89
- Champions: Sliema Wanderers F.C. (22nd title)
- Relegated: Rabat Ajax F.C. Birkirkara F.C.
- European Cup: Sliema Wanderers F.C.
- European Cup Winners' Cup: Hamrun Spartans F.C.
- UEFA Cup: Valletta F.C.
- Matches played: 72
- Goals scored: 175 (2.43 per match)

The 1988–89 Maltese Premier League was the 9th season of the Maltese Premier League, and the 74th season of top-tier football in Malta. It was contested by 9 teams, and Sliema Wanderers F.C. won the championship.

== Teams ==
Locations of the 1988–89 Maltese Premier League teams

== League standings ==
| Pos | Team | Pld | W | D | L | GF | GA | GD | Pts | Qualification |
|---|---|---|---|---|---|---|---|---|---|---|
| 1 | Sliema Wanderers F.C. (C) | 16 | 11 | 4 | 1 | 32 | 16 | +16 | 26 | Qualification for the European Cup |
| 2 | Valletta F.C. | 16 | 9 | 5 | 2 | 24 | 9 | +15 | 23 | Qualification for the UEFA Cup |
| 3 | Ħamrun Spartans F.C. | 16 | 8 | 4 | 4 | 31 | 15 | +16 | 20 | Qualification for the European Cup Winners' Cup (Note: Hamrun Spartans qualified for the Cup Winners' Cup as Maltese FA Trophy Winners) |
| 4 | Floriana F.C. | 16 | 6 | 6 | 4 | 20 | 15 | +5 | 18 | |
| 5 | Żurrieq F.C. | 16 | 5 | 4 | 7 | 14 | 21 | −7 | 14 | |
| 6 | Naxxar Lions | 16 | 3 | 6 | 7 | 10 | 22 | −12 | 12 | |
| 7 | Hibernians F.C. | 16 | 2 | 8 | 6 | 16 | 21 | −5 | 12 | |
| 8 | Rabat Ajax F.C. (R) | 16 | 2 | 8 | 6 | 14 | 26 | −12 | 12 | Relegation |
| 9 | Birkirkara F.C. (R) | 16 | 1 | 5 | 10 | 14 | 30 | −16 | 7 | Relegation |

Source: rsssf.com
(C) Champions; (R) Relegated

=== Relegation tie-breaker ===
With Naxxar Lions, Hibernians, and Rabat Ajax all level on 12 points each, their head-to-head points were decisive. Rabat Ajax F.C. had the fewest points in those matches and were therefore immediately finished in 8th place and Relegated.

| Pos | Team | Pld | W | D | L | GF | GA | GD | Pts | Relegation |
|---|---|---|---|---|---|---|---|---|---|---|
| 6 | Naxxar Lions | 4 | 2 | 1 | 1 | 3 | 3 | 0 | 5 | |
| 7 | Hibernians F.C. | 4 | 1 | 2 | 1 | 2 | 1 | +1 | 4 | |
| 8 | Rabat Ajax F.C. (R) | 4 | 0 | 3 | 1 | 1 | 2 | −1 | 3 | Relegation |

Source: RSSSF
(R) Relegated

== Results ==
| Home \ Away | BKR | FRN | HIB | ĦMR | NXR | RBT | SLM | VLT | ŻRQ |
|---|---|---|---|---|---|---|---|---|---|
| Birkirkara | — | 0–3 | 1–2 | 1–4 | 1–1 | 1–2 | 2–3 | 1–1 | 1–3 |
| Floriana | 1–1 | — | 1–0 | 1–1 | 1–1 | 1–1 | 0–1 | 0–2 | 3–0 |
| Hibernians | 2–2 | 1–1 | — | 2–2 | 0–1 | 0–0 | 2–2 | 1–2 | 1–1 |
| Ħamrun Spartans | 3–1 | 1–2 | 1–1 | — | 3–0 | 3–0 | 2–2 | 0–1 | 4–0 |
| Naxxar Lions | 0–2 | 1–0 | 0–2 | 0–2 | — | 1–0 | 1–2 | 1–1 | 0–0 |
| Rabat Ajax | 1–0 | 2–3 | 0–0 | 2–3 | 1–1 | — | 1–5 | 1–1 | 0–0 |
| Sliema Wanderers | 3–0 | 1–0 | 3–1 | 1–0 | 1–1 | 3–3 | — | 1–0 | 0–1 |
| Valletta | 0–0 | 2–2 | 2–1 | 1–0 | 2–0 | 4–0 | 0–1 | — | 1–0 |
| Żurrieq | 1–0 | 0–1 | 2–0 | 0–2 | 4–1 | 0–0 | 2–3 | 0–4 | — |

Legend: Blue = home team win; Yellow = draw; Red = away team win.
