= Antoine Zahra (footballer, born 1977) =

Maltese footballer

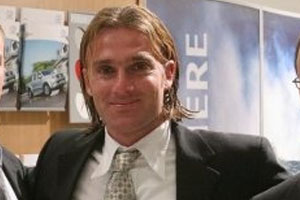

Personal information
- Full name: Antoine Zahra
- Date of birth: 5 March 1977 (age 49)
- Place of birth: Mosta, Malta
- Height: 5 ft 7 in (1.70 m)
- Position: Midfielder

Team information
- Current team: Birkirkara
- Number: 11

Youth career
- –1992: Birkirkara

Senior career*
Years	Team	Apps	(Gls)
1993–1994	Birkirkara	17	(1)
1994–1996	Birkirkara Luxol	31	(8)
1997–	Birkirkara	162	(31)

International career^{‡}
- Malta U16
- Malta U18
- Malta U21
1996–2005	Malta	50	(2)
- * Club domestic league appearances and goals as of 14 September 2007 ‡ National team caps and goals as of 14 September 2007

Antoine Zahra (born 5 March 1977, Mosta, Malta) is a former professional footballer currently playing for Maltese Premier League side Birkirkara, where he plays as a midfielder.

== Playing career ==
=== Birkirkara ===
Zahra has always been loyal to Birkirkara, and played for Birkirkara Luxol, the result of merger between Birkirkara and Luxol St. Andrews, which lasted only two seasons. He returned to Birkirkara's squad list.
