= Charles Scerri =

Maltese footballer (born 1964)

Personal information
- Full name: Charles Scerri
- Date of birth: 29 April 1964 (age 62)
- Place of birth: Qormi, Malta
- Position: Midfielder

Senior career*
Years	Team	Apps	(Gls)
1980–1983	Floriana	19	(0)
1983–1985	Rabat Ajax	27	(5)
1985-1986	Sliema Wanderers	14	(3)
1986–1999	Hibernians	223	(41)
2000–2001	Ħamrun Spartans	15	(6)
2001	Qormi	8	(0)
2001–2002	Luxol St. Andrews	10	(4)
Total		316	(59)

International career^{‡}
- Malta U18
1985–1994	Malta	63	(3)
1987–1988	Malta XI	2	(0)

Managerial career
- 2009: Malta U17
- 2010-2012: Qormi (assistant)
- 2012: Malta U17 (assistant)
- 2019: Malta U19 (assistant)
- 2021-2022: Malta U15 (assistant)
- * Club domestic league appearances and goals ‡ National team caps and goals as of 11 August 2009

Charles Scerri or Charles Xerri, (born 29 April 1964 in Malta) is a retired footballer and former manager of the Malta Under 17 side. He later assisted Stephen Azzopardi at Qormi and Winston Muscat at the Malta U-19s.

Born in Qormi, Scerri played for Floriana, Rabat Ajax, Sliema Wanderers, Hibernians, Hamrun Spartans, Qormi and St. Andrews. Throughout his career Charlie played as a midfielder. He was voted Maltese footballer of the year in the 1988/89 season.

== International career ==
Scerri made his debut for Malta in an October 1985 World Cup qualification match away against Portugal and earned a total of 65 caps (2 unofficial), scoring 3 goals. His final international was a December 1994 European Championship qualification match against Norway.

== International goals ==
#	Date	Venue	Opponent	Score	Result	Competition
1	7 February 1990	National Stadium, Ta' Qali, Malta	Norway	1–1	1–1	Friendly
2	7 June 1991	Olympic Stadium, Seoul, South Korea	Indonesia	2–0	3–0	Friendly
3	19 April 1994	National Stadium, Ta' Qali, Malta	Azerbaijan	5–0	5–0	Friendly

== Honours ==
Rabat Ajax

- Maltese Premier League: 1

1985

Hibernians

- Maltese Premier League: 2

1994, 1995

- FA Trophy: 1

1998
