= Ólafur Þórðarson (footballer) =

Icelandic footballer and manager

Personal information
- Full name: Ólafur Þórðarson
- Date of birth: 22 August 1965 (age 61)
- Place of birth: Iceland
- Height: 1.70 m (5 ft 7 in)
- Position: Midfielder

Senior career*
Years	Team	Apps	(Gls)
1983–1988	IA Akranes	89	(9)
1989–1990	S.K. Brann	40	(6)
1991–1992	Lyn	28	(2)
1993–1997	IA Akranes	84	(19)
1998–1999	Fylkir	32	(6)
2000–2002	IA Akranes	13	(0)
Total		286	(42)

International career
1984–1996	Iceland	72	(5)

Managerial career
- 1997–1999: Fylkir (Reykjavik)
- 1999–2006: IA Akranes
- 2007: Fram (Reykjavik)
- 2008–2011: Fylkir (Reykjavik)
- 2011–2015: Víkingur (Reykjavik)
- * Club domestic league appearances and goals

Ólafur Þórðarson (Icelandic pronunciation: [ˈoulavʏr̥ˈθourðarsɔn̥]; born 22 August 1965) is an Icelandic former footballer, who played as a midfielder. Ólafur is the former coach of Vikingur Reykjavik. He is the brother of Teitur Thordarson, former manager of Estonia when Ólafur played against them with Iceland in 1996.

== Club career ==
Ólafur started his career at IA Akranes before moving abroad to play in the Norwegian League. He returned to Iceland after four seasons to captain the IA side again and participated in IA Akranes glory years when they won the championship title five consecutive times from 1992 to 1996.

After the 1997 season he was hired as player/manager at Fylkir and got them promoted in 1999. In the autumn same year he was appointed as manager of IA Akranes which he managed until mid season 2006 when he was sacked because the team were battling in the relegation zone. Ólafur also played briefly with the team but his last game in football was 2002. Under his management IA Akranes won the Úrvalsdeild (top-flight) title in 2001 and the VISA-bikar twice, in 2000 and 2003.

In 2007, Ólafur took charge of Fram and guided them into 7th place. After the season, he quit and was without a team in the 2008 season. But in start of October 2008 he was announced as new manager of Fylkir and returned to the club where he started his coaching career.

After three decent seasons with Fylkir finishing 3rd in 2009, Ólafur decided to step down from the coaching role after the 2011 season after guiding them to a mid-table finish, allegedly due to disagreement with the board over player transfer issues.

Ólafur was quickly picked up after the 2011 season, in October the same year, to coach Víkingur Reykjavik. The Vikings had been unfortunate to suffer relegation in the 2011 season and were eager to regain their place among the best. After one season of struggle and re-organization at Víkin in 2012, Ólafur's work paid off as he managed to push Víkingur into promotion to the Úrvalsdeild in the 2013 season along with coach Miloš Milojević. In the following season, together they carefully steered the team to a Europa League qualifying position of 4th place in the 2014 season, Víkingur's highest league position since winning the championship title in 1991.

== International career ==
Ólafur made his debut for Iceland in 1984 and went on to collect 72 caps, scoring 5 goals.

He played his last international match in a November 1996 World Cup qualifying match against Ireland.

== Honours ==
- Icelandic Championships: 7
  - 1983, 1984, 1993, 1994, 1995, 1996, 2001
- Icelandic Cups: 7
  - 1983, 1984, 1986, 1993, 1996, 2000, 2003
- 1995 Iceland Players' Player of the year
