= Arnar Grétarsson =

Icelandic footballer and manager

Personal information
- Date of birth: 20 February 1972 (age 54)
- Place of birth: Reykjavík, Iceland
- Height: 1.80 m (5 ft 11 in)
- Position: Midfielder

Youth career
- 1987: Breiðablik

Senior career*
Years	Team	Apps	(Gls)
1988–1997	Breiðablik	139	(27)
1989–1990	→ Rangers (loan)	0	(0)
1997	Leiftur	6	(0)
1997–2000	AEK Athens	67	(2)
2000–2006	Lokeren	157	(36)
2006–2009	Breiðablik	60	(5)
2015	Augnablik	1	(1)

International career
1987	Iceland U16	6	(4)
1988–1990	Iceland U18	12	(2)
1991	Iceland U21	4	(0)
1991–2004	Iceland	71	(2)

Managerial career
- 2009: Breiðablik (assistant)
- 2015–2017: Breiðablik
- 2019: Roeselare
- 2020–2022: KA Akureyri
- 2022–2024: Valur
- 2025: Fylkir
- * Club domestic league appearances and goals

Arnar Grétarsson (born 20 February 1972) is an Icelandic football manager and former player.

== Club career ==
Grétarsson started his career at Breiðablik, where he played for several years until 1997 when he joined Leiftur, where he played for one year.

On 8 August 1997 he traveled to Greece and signed for AEK Athens, where he played for three seasons. After his contract expired in 2000, Arnar signed for Belgian club Lokeren, where he played until 2006, when he moved back to his homeland to play for Breiðablik again.

== International career ==
Arnar made his debut for Iceland in the famous 5–1 shock defeat of Turkey in a September 1991 friendly match. He has been capped 71 times for Iceland, scoring two goals. His last international match was an October 2004 World Cup qualifying match against Malta.

== Managerial career ==
In 2009, Arnar was appointed assistant manager of Breiðablik. In April 2010, AEK Athens appointed him director of football. He left the club due to a reorganization of the club in the summer of 2012.

In 2013, he was appointed sporting director with Belgian team Club Brugge.

In late 2014 he was appointed as manager of Breiðablik ahead of the 2015 season.

In a major reshake in the fall of 2022 he was appointed by Valur as their manager soon after he was sacked as manager of KA Akureyri, after having notable success as manager in the northern capital the Icelandic giants hope to bring stability to their setup.

== Personal life ==
His older brother, Sigurður, was also an Iceland international.
