= Damian Halata =

German footballer (born 1962)

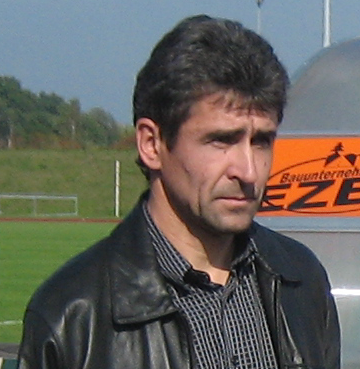
- Halata with Meuselwitz in 2008

Personal information
- Date of birth: 8 August 1962 (age 64)
- Place of birth: Świętochłowice, Poland
- Height: 1.78 m (5 ft 10 in)
- Position: Forward

Youth career
- 1975–1980: 1. FC Magdeburg

Senior career*
Years	Team	Apps	(Gls)
1980–1988	1. FC Magdeburg	193	(47)
1988–1991	1. FC Lok Leipzig	76	(21)
Total		269	(68)

International career
1986–1988	East Germany Olympic team	30	(7)
1984–1989	East Germany	4	(1)

Managerial career
- 1994: VfB Leipzig
- 1996: VfB Leipzig
- 1997–1998: VfB Leipzig
- 1998–1999: Dynamo Dresden
- 2002–2006: ZFC Meuselwitz
- 2007: SV Dessau 05
- 2007–2011: ZFC Meuselwitz
- 2012–2013: Budissa Bautzen
- * Club domestic league appearances and goals

Damian Halata (born 8 August 1962) is a German former professional football player and manager. Born in Poland, he represented the East Germany national team internationally.

== Club career ==
Halata was born in Świętochłowice, Silesia, Poland. He spent his senior career at two clubs, playing 267 DDR-Oberliga matches for 1. FC Magdeburg (1975–1988) and 1. FC Lokomotive Leipzig (1988–91). He also appeared in 14 matches on the European level for the two clubs.

In October 1988, Halata managed to score five goals in one game against BSG Sachsenring Zwickau. After qualifying for 2. Bundesliga with Lok Leipzig, Halata suffered an injury in the first match of the 1991–92 season that ended his playing career.

== International career ==
Halata played four matches for East Germany, scoring once. Altogether, Halata appeared in 30 matches (seven goals) with the Olympic team (qualification tournament for Seoul: eight matches/two goals).

== Managerial career ==
After his playing career, Halata became assistant manager of VfB Leipzig, working under managers Jürgen Sundermann and Bernd Stange. Aged 31, on 9 April 1994, he took over as interim manager, when Leipzig were assured relegation from the Bundesliga. Between 1 July 1994 and 30 April 1996, he returned to the role of assistant manager, until he was made interim manager once more on 1 May 1996. This time he prevented the club's relegation from 2. Bundesliga. After again returning to his duties as assistant manager in the following season, Halata was once more given the task to save VfB Leipzig from relegation on 7 December 1997, but he could not prevent the club's relegation at the end of the season. From 8 December 1998 to February 1999, he was manager of 1. FC Dynamo Dresden, staying at the club as assistant manager until 14 March 2001.

On 1 January 2002, he took over as manager of ZFC Meuselwitz, then on a relegation spot in the fifth-tier Landesliga Thüringen. He secured non-relegation, then finished second in 2003 before winning promotion to the NOFV-Oberliga in 2004. In their first season, Meuselwitz finished sixth. After a disappointing start to the 2005–06 season, Halata stepped down as manager of Meuselwitz, only to rescind his decision days later. He stayed at the helm until June 2006, leading the club to a 5th place.

On 22 March 2007, Halata took over as manager of SV Dessau 05 in the NOFV-Oberliga. In December 2007, Halata returned as manager of ZFC Meuselwitz, signing a contract until June 2012.

== Career statistics ==
=== International ===
Appearances and goals by national team and year
National team	Year	Apps	Goals
East Germany	1984	1	0
East Germany	1985	–	
East Germany	1986	1	0
East Germany	1987	–	
East Germany	1988	–	
East Germany	1989	2	1
Total		4	1

Scores and results list East Germany's goal tally first, score column indicates score after each Halata goal.

List of international goals scored by Damian Halata
No.	Date	Venue	Opponent	Score	Result	Competition
1	8 March 1989	Olympic Stadium, Athens, Greece	Greece	1–2	2–3	Friendly
