= Italy national football team results (1990–2009) =

- Win Draw Loss

This is a list of the Italy national football team results from 1990 to 2009. During this period, Italy achieved first place at the 2006 FIFA World Cup, second place at the 1994 World Cup and at UEFA Euro 2000, third place at the 1990 World Cup and the bronze medal at the 2004 Olympic football tournament.

== Results ==
=== 1990 ===
21 February 1990 International friendly	Netherlands	0–0	Italy	Rotterdam, Netherlands
20:45 CET (UTC+01:00)		Report		Stadium: Feyenoord Stadion; Attendance: 24,198; Referee: Gérard Biguet (France)

31 March 1990 International friendly	Switzerland	0–1	Italy	Basel, Switzerland
16:00 CEST (UTC+02:00)		Report	De Agostini 68'	Stadium: St. Jakob Stadium; Attendance: 25,000; Referee: Karl-Josef Assenmacher (Germany)

9 June 1990 1990 FIFA World Cup; Group A	Italy	1–0	Austria	Rome, Italy
21:00 CEST (UTC+02:00)	Schillaci 78'	Report		Stadium: Stadio Olimpico; Attendance: 73,303; Referee: José Roberto Wright (Brazil)

14 June 1990 1990 FIFA World Cup; Group A	Italy	1–0	United States	Rome, Italy
21:00 CEST (UTC+02:00)	Giannini 11'	Report		Stadium: Stadio Olimpico; Attendance: 73,423; Referee: Edgardo Codesal (Mexico)

19 June 1990 1990 FIFA World Cup; Group A	Italy	2–0	Czechoslovakia	Rome, Italy
21:00 CEST (UTC+02:00)	Schillaci 9'; R. Baggio 78'	Report		Stadium: Stadio Olimpico; Attendance: 73,303; Referee: Joël Quiniou (France)

25 June 1990 1990 FIFA World Cup; Round of 16	Italy	2–0	Uruguay	Rome, Italy
21:00 CEST (UTC+02:00)	Schillaci 65'; Serena 83'	Report		Stadium: Stadio Olimpico; Attendance: 73,303; Referee: George Courtney (England)

30 June 1990 1990 FIFA World Cup; Quarter-final	Italy	1–0	Republic of Ireland	Rome, Italy
21:00 CEST (UTC+02:00)	Schillaci 38'	Report		Stadium: Stadio Olimpico; Attendance: 73,303; Referee: Carlos Silva Valente (Portugal)

3 July 1990 1990 FIFA World Cup; Semi-final	Italy	1–1 (a.e.t.) (3–4 p)	Argentina	Naples, Italy
20:00 CEST (UTC+02:00)	Schillaci 17'	Report	Caniggia 67'	Stadium: Stadio San Paolo; Attendance: 59,978; Referee: Michel Vautrot (France)
	Penalties
	(penalty scored) Baresi; (penalty scored) R. Baggio; (penalty scored) De Agostini; (penalty missed) Donadoni; (penalty missed) Serena		Serrizuela (penalty scored); Burruchaga (penalty scored); Olarticoechea (penalty scored); Maradona (penalty scored)

7 July 1990 1990 FIFA World Cup; Third place play-off	Italy	2–1	England	Bari, Italy
20:00 CEST (UTC+02:00)	R. Baggio 71'; Schillaci 86' (pen.)	Report	Platt 81'	Stadium: Stadio San Nicola; Attendance: 51,426; Referee: Joël Quiniou (France)

26 September 1990 International friendly	Italy	1–0	Netherlands	Palermo, Italy
20:15 CEST (UTC+02:00)	R. Baggio 45'	Report		Stadium: Stadio La Favorita; Attendance: 36,000; Referee: Zoran Petrović (Yugoslavia)

17 October 1990 UEFA Euro 1992 qualifying Group 3	Hungary	1–1	Italy	Budapest, Hungary
19:00 CEST (UTC+02:00)	Disztl 16'	Report	R. Baggio 54' (pen.)	Stadium: Népstadion; Attendance: 24,431; Referee: Bo Karlsson (Sweden)

3 November 1990 UEFA Euro 1992 qualifying Group 3	Italy	0–0	Soviet Union	Rome, Italy
14:30 CEST (UTC+02:00)		Report		Stadium: Stadio Olimpico; Attendance: 52,208; Referee: Marcel Van Langenhove (Belgium)

22 December 1990 UEFA Euro 1992 qualifying Group 3	Cyprus	0–4	Italy	Limassol, Cyprus
15:00 EET (UTC+02:00)		Report	Vierchowod 15'; Serena 22', 50'; Lombardo 44'	Stadium: Tsirion Stadium; Attendance: 9,185; Referee: Ivan Gregr (Czechoslovakia)

=== 1991 ===
13 February 1991 International friendly	Italy	0–0	Belgium	Terni, Italy
20:15 CET (UTC+01:00)		Report		Stadium: Stadio Libero Liberati; Attendance: 22,000; Referee: Stavros Zakestidis (Greece)

1 May 1991 UEFA Euro 1992 qualifying Group 3	Italy	3–1	Hungary	Salerno, Italy
20:15 CEST (UTC+02:00)	Donadoni 4', 16'; Vialli 56'	Report	Bognar 65' (pen.)	Stadium: Stadio Arechi; Attendance: 37,602; Referee: Joe Worrall (England)

5 June 1991 UEFA Euro 1992 qualifying Group 3	Norway	2–1	Italy	Oslo, Norway
19:00 CEST (UTC+02:00)	Dahlum 4'; Bohinen 25'	Report	Schillaci 77'	Stadium: Ullevaal Stadion; Attendance: 24,346; Referee: Mario van der Ende (Netherlands)

12 June 1991 Scania 100 Tournament	Denmark	0–2 (a.e.t.)	Italy	Malmö, Sweden
19:00 CEST (UTC+02:00)		Report	Rizzitelli 106'; Vialli 108'	Stadium: Malmö Stadion; Attendance: 8,741; Referee: Bo Karlsson (Sweden)

16 June 1991 Scania 100 Tournament	Italy	1–1 (a.e.t.) (3–2 p)	Soviet Union	Stockholm, Sweden
18:00 CEST (UTC+02:00)	Giannini 43'	Report	Korneev 2'	Stadium: Råsunda Stadium; Attendance: 8,062; Referee: George Courtney (England)
	Penalties
	Berti (penalty missed); Baresi (penalty scored); De Agostini (penalty scored); Vierchowod (penalty scored)		(penalty missed) Shalimov; (penalty scored) Kuznetsov; (penalty missed) Kulkov; (penalty scored) Kanchelskis; (penalty missed) Mostovoi

25 September 1991 International friendly	Bulgaria	2–1	Italy	Sofia, Bulgaria
18:00 EEST (UTC+03:00)	Kostadinov 43'; Stoichkov 50' (pen.)	Report	Giannini 55'	Stadium: Vasil Levski National Stadium; Attendance: 20,000; Referee: Branimir Babarogic (Yugoslavia)

12 October 1991 UEFA Euro 1992 qualifying Group 3	Soviet Union	0–0	Italy	Moscow, Russia
19:00 MT (UTC+02:00)		Report		Stadium: Luzhniki Stadium; Attendance: 100,000; Referee: Bruno Galler (Switzerland)

13 November 1991^{1} UEFA Euro 1992 qualifying Group 3	Italy	1–1	Norway	Genoa, Italy
19:15 CET (UTC+01:00)	Rizzitelli 83'	Report	Jakobsen 60'	Stadium: Stadio Luigi Ferraris; Attendance: 21,372; Referee: Karl-Josef Assenmacher (Germany)

21 December 1991 UEFA Euro 1992 qualifying Group 3	Italy	2–0	Cyprus	Foggia, Italy
14:30 CET (UTC+01:00)	Vialli 28'; R. Baggio 55'	Report		Stadium: Stadio Pino Zaccheria; Attendance: 17,732; Referee: Joaquin Ramos Marcos (Spain)

=== 1992 ===
19 February 1992 International friendly	Italy	4–0	San Marino	Cesena, Italy
15:00 CET (UTC+01:00)	R. Baggio 36', 84'; Donadoni 42'; Casiraghi 47'	Report		Stadium: Stadio Dino Manuzzi; Attendance: 18,353; Referee: Arturo Martino (Switzerland)

25 March 1992 International friendly	Italy	1–0	Germany	Turin, Italy
20:30 CET (UTC+01:00)	R. Baggio 86' (pen.)	Report		Stadium: Stadio delle Alpi; Attendance: 35,800; Referee: Rune Larsson (Sweden)

31 May 1992 1992 U.S. Cup	Italy	0–0	Portugal	New Haven, Connecticut, United States
21:00 EDT (UTC−04:00)		Report		Stadium: Yale Bowl; Attendance: 38,833; Referee: Raul J. Dominguez (United States)

4 June 1992 1992 U.S. Cup	Italy	2–0	Republic of Ireland	Boston, United States
22:00 EDT (UTC−04:00)	Signori 17'; Costacurta 56' (pen.)	Report		Stadium: Foxboro Stadium; Attendance: 34,797; Referee: Jack D'Aquila (United States)

6 June 1992 1992 U.S. Cup	United States	1–1	Italy	Chicago, United States
21:00 CDT (UTC−05:00)	Harkes 23'	Report	R. Baggio 2'	Stadium: Soldier Field; Attendance: 26,874; Referee: Vargas Gonzales (Costa Rica)

9 September 1992 International friendly	Netherlands	2–3	Italy	Eindhoven, Netherlands
20:00 CEST (UTC+02:00)	Bergkamp 4', 21'	Report	Eranio 29'; R. Baggio 41' (pen.); Vialli 77'	Stadium: Philips Stadion; Attendance: 12,800; Referee: Markus Merk (Germany)

14 October 1992 1994 FIFA World Cup qualification Group 1	Italy	2–2	Switzerland	Cagliari, Italy
20:15 CEST (UTC+02:00)	R. Baggio 83'; Eranio 90+1'	Report	Ohrel 17'; Chapuisat 21'	Stadium: Stadio Sant'Elia; Attendance: 26,216; Referee: Peter Mikkelsen (Denmark)

18 November 1992 1994 FIFA World Cup qualification Group 1	Scotland	0–0	Italy	Glasgow, Scotland
21:00 GMT (UTC±00:00)		Report		Stadium: Ibrox Park; Attendance: 33,029; Referee: Aron Schmidhuber (Germany)

19 December 1992 1994 FIFA World Cup qualification Group 1	Malta	1–2	Italy	Ta' Qali, Malta
20:15 CET (UTC+01:00)	Gregory 85'	Report	Vialli 59'; Signori 62'	Stadium: Ta' Qali National Stadium; Attendance: 14,191; Referee: Guy Goethals (Belgium)

=== 1993 ===
20 January 1993 International friendly	Italy	2–0	Mexico	Florence, Italy
20:30 CET (UTC+01:00)	R. Baggio 56'; Maldini 80'	Report		Stadium: Stadio Artemio Franchi; Attendance: 19,259; Referee: Marc Batta (France)

24 February 1993 1994 FIFA World Cup qualification Group 1	Portugal	1–3	Italy	Porto, Portugal
21:30 WET (UTC±00:00)	Couto 56'	Report	R. Baggio 2'; Casiraghi 25'; D. Baggio 73'	Stadium: Estádio das Antas; Attendance: 30,761; Referee: Bo Karlsson (Sweden)

24 March 1993 1994 FIFA World Cup qualification Group 1	Italy	6–1	Malta	Palermo, Italy
20:30 CET (UTC+01:00)	D. Baggio 19'; Signori 38'; Vierchowod 48'; Mancini 58', 89'; Maldini 73'	Report	Busuttil 68' (pen.)	Stadium: Stadio La Favorita; Attendance: 33,720; Referee: Vassilios Nikakis (Greece)

14 April 1993 1994 FIFA World Cup qualification Group 1	Italy	2–0	Estonia	Trieste, Italy
20:30 CEST (UTC+02:00)	R. Baggio 22'; Signori 87'	Report		Stadium: Stadio Nereo Rocco; Attendance: 33,000; Referee: Sándor Piller (Hungary)

1 May 1993 1994 FIFA World Cup qualification Group 1	Switzerland	1–0	Italy	Bern, Switzerland
20:15 CEST (UTC+02:00)	Hottiger 56'	Report		Stadium: Wankdorf Stadium; Attendance: 32,000; Referee: Antonio Martin Navarrete (Spain)

22 September 1993 1994 FIFA World Cup qualification Group 1	Estonia	0–3	Italy	Tallinn, Estonia
19:30 EEST (UTC+03:00)		Report	R. Baggio 20' (pen.), 73'; Mancini 59'	Stadium: Kadriorg Stadium; Attendance: 5,350; Referee: Jan Damgaard (Denmark)

13 October 1993 1994 FIFA World Cup qualification Group 1	Italy	3–1	Scotland	Rome, Italy
20:30 CEST (UTC+02:00)	Donadoni 3'; Casiraghi 16'; Eranio 80'	Report	Gallacher 80'	Stadium: Stadio Olimpico; Attendance: 61,178; Referee: Ion Crăciunescu (Romania)

17 November 1993 1994 FIFA World Cup qualification Group 1	Italy	1–0	Portugal	Milan, Italy
20:30 CET (UTC+01:00)	D. Baggio 83'	Report		Stadium: Stadio San Siro; Attendance: 71,513; Referee: Ryszard Wójcik (Poland)

=== 1994 ===
16 February 1994 International friendly	Italy	0–1	France	Naples, Italy
20:30 CET (UTC+01:00)		Report	Djorkaeff 44'	Stadium: Stadio San Paolo; Attendance: 17,241; Referee: Markus Merk (Germany)

23 March 1994 International friendly	Germany	2–1	Italy	Stuttgart, Germany
20:30 CET (UTC+01:00)	Klinsmann 45', 47'	Report	D. Baggio 44'	Stadium: Gottlieb-Daimler-Stadion; Attendance: 52,800; Referee: James McCluskey (Scotland)

27 May 1994 International friendly	Italy	2–0	Finland	Parma, Italy
20:30 CEST (UTC+02:00)	Signori 23'; Casiraghi 67'	Report		Stadium: Stadio Ennio Tardini; Attendance: 16,714; Referee: Laszlo Vagner (Hungary)

3 June 1994 International friendly	Italy	1–0	Switzerland	Rome, Italy
20:30 CEST (UTC+02:00)	Signori 24'	Report		Stadium: Stadio Olimpico; Attendance: 38,019; Referee: Juan Manuel Brito Arceo (Spain)

11 June 1994 International friendly	Costa Rica	0–1	Italy	New Haven, United States
14:00 EDT (UTC−04:00)		Report	Signori 65'	Stadium: Yale Bowl; Attendance: 23,547; Referee: Esfandiar Baharmast (United States)

18 June 1994 1994 FIFA World Cup; Group E	Italy	0–1	Republic of Ireland	New York, United States
16:00 EDT (UTC−04:00)		Report	Houghton 11'	Stadium: Giants Stadium; Attendance: 75,338; Referee: Mario van der Ende (Netherlands)

23 June 1994 1994 FIFA World Cup; Group E	Italy	1–0	Norway	New York, United States
16:00 EDT (UTC−04:00)	D. Baggio 69'	Report		Stadium: Giants Stadium; Attendance: 74,624; Referee: Hellmut Krug (Germany)

28 June 1994 1994 FIFA World Cup; Group E	Italy	1–1	Mexico	Washington, United States
12:30 EDT (UTC−04:00)	Massaro 48'	Report	Bernal 57'	Stadium: Robert F. Kennedy Memorial Stadium; Attendance: 52,535; Referee: Francisco Oscar Lamolina (Argentina)

5 July 1994 1994 FIFA World Cup; Round of 16	Nigeria	1–2 (a.e.t.)	Italy	Foxborough, United States
13:00 EDT (UTC−04:00)	Amuneke 25'	Report	R. Baggio 88', 102' (pen.)	Stadium: Foxboro Stadium; Attendance: 54,367; Referee: Arturo Brizio Carter (Mexico)

9 July 1994 1994 FIFA World Cup; Quarter-final	Italy	2–1	Spain	Foxborough, United States
12:00 EDT (UTC−04:00)	D. Baggio 25'; R. Baggio 88'	Report	Caminero 58'	Stadium: Foxboro Stadium; Attendance: 53,400; Referee: Sándor Puhl (Hungary)

13 July 1994 1994 FIFA World Cup; Semi-final	Bulgaria	1–2	Italy	East Rutherford, United States
16:00 EDT (UTC−04:00)	Stoichkov 44' (pen.)	Report	R. Baggio 21', 25'	Stadium: Giants Stadium; Attendance: 74,110; Referee: Joël Quiniou (France)

17 July 1994 1994 FIFA World Cup; Final	Brazil	0–0 (a.e.t.) (3–2 p)	Italy	Pasadena, United States
12:30 PDT (UTC−07:00)		Report		Stadium: Rose Bowl; Attendance: 94,194; Referee: Sándor Puhl (Hungary)
	Penalties
	Márcio Santos (penalty missed); Romário (penalty scored); Branco (penalty scored); Dunga (penalty scored)		(penalty missed) Baresi; (penalty scored) Albertini; (penalty scored) Evani; (penalty missed) Massaro; (penalty missed) R. Baggio

7 September 1994 UEFA Euro 1996 qualifying Group 4	Slovenia	1–1	Italy	Maribor, Slovenia
20:15 CEST (UTC+02:00)	Udovič 14'	Report	Costacurta 16'	Stadium: Ljudski vrt Attendance: 5,200; Referee: Bernd Heynemann (Germany)

8 October 1994 UEFA Euro 1996 qualifying Group 4	Estonia	0–2	Italy	Tallinn, Estonia
20:00 EEST (UTC+03:00)		Report	Panucci 20'; Casiraghi 78'	Stadium: Kadrioru Stadium; Attendance: 3,850; Referee: Werner Müller (Switzerland)

16 November 1994 UEFA Euro 1996 qualifying Group 4	Italy	1–2	Croatia	Palermo, Italy
20:30 CET (UTC+01:00)	D. Baggio 89'	Report	Šuker 32', 57'	Stadium: Stadio Della Favorita; Attendance: 33,570; Referee: Joël Quiniou (France)

21 December 1994 International friendly	Italy	3–1	Turkey	Pescara, Italy
20:30 CET (UTC+01:00)	Crippa 44'; Lombardo 55'; Apolloni 84'	Report	Tolunay 62'	Stadium: Stadio Adriatico; Attendance: 5,200; Referee: Gunter Benko (Austria)

=== 1995 ===
25 March 1995 UEFA Euro 1996 qualifying Group 4	Italy	4–1	Estonia	Salerno, Italy
20:30 CET (UTC+01:00)	Zola 44', 65'; Albertini 59'; Ravanelli 85'	Report	Reim 72'	Stadium: Stadio Arechi; Attendance: 38,000; Referee: Roger Philippi (Luxembourg)

29 March 1995 UEFA Euro 1996 qualifying Group 4	Ukraine	0–2	Italy	Kyiv, Ukraine
21:30 EEST (UTC+03:00)		Report	Lombardo 12'; Zola 38'	Stadium: Republikan Stadium; Attendance: 22,000; Referee: Sándor Puhl (Hungary)

26 April 1995 UEFA Euro 1996 qualifying Group 4	Lithuania	0–1	Italy	Vilnius, Lithuania
20:00 EEST (UTC+03:00)		Report	Zola 11'	Stadium: Žalgiris Stadium; Attendance: 15,000; Referee: Jim McCluskey (Scotland)

19 June 1995 International friendly	Switzerland	0–1	Italy	Lausanne, Switzerland
20:30 CEST (UTC+02:00)		Report	Casiraghi 55'	Stadium: Stade olympique de la Pontaise; Attendance: 13,000; Referee: Markus Merk (Germany)

21 June 1995 International friendly	Germany	2–0	Italy	Zürich, Switzerland
20:30 CEST (UTC+02:00)	Helmer 4'; Maldini 37' (o.g.)	Report		Stadium: Letzigrund; Attendance: 17,000; Referee: Detruche Detruche (Switzerland)

6 September 1995 UEFA Euro 1996 qualifying Group 4	Italy	1–0	Slovenia	Udine, Italy
20:30 CEST (UTC+02:00)	Ravanelli 13'	Report		Stadium: Stadio Friuli; Attendance: 18,532; Referee: Ladislav Gadoši (Slovakia)

8 October 1995 UEFA Euro 1996 qualifying Group 4	Croatia	1–1	Italy	Split, Croatia
20:30 CEST (UTC+02:00)	Šuker 48' (pen.)	Report	Albertini 29'	Stadium: Stadion Poljud; Attendance: 35,000; Referee: Jaap Uilenberg (Netherlands)

11 November 1995 UEFA Euro 1996 qualifying Group 4	Italy	3–1	Ukraine	Bari, Italy
20:30 CET (UTC+01:00)	Ravanelli 22', 49'; Maldini 54'	Report	Polunin 19'	Stadium: Stadio San Nicola; Attendance: 43,999; Referee: Serge Muhmenthaler (Switzerland)

15 November 1995 UEFA Euro 1996 qualifying Group 4	Italy	4–0	Lithuania	Reggio Emilia, Italy
20:30 CET (UTC+01:00)	Del Piero 51'; Zola 65', 81', 83'	Report		Stadium: Stadio Giglio; Attendance: 22,272; Referee: Manuel Díaz Vega (Spain)

=== 1996 ===
24 January 1996 International friendly	Italy	3–0	Wales	Terni, Italy
20:30 CET (UTC+01:00)	Del Piero 1'; Ravanelli 50'; Casiraghi 77'	Report		Stadium: Stadio Libero Liberati; Attendance: 16,095; Referee: Guy Goethals (Belgium)

29 May 1996 International friendly	Italy	2–2	Belgium	Cremona, Italy
20:45 CEST (UTC+02:00)	Del Piero 25'; Chiesa 55'	Report	Claeys 5'; Carboni 11' (o.g.)	Stadium: Stadio Giovanni Zini; Attendance: 13,247; Referee: Kurt Zuppinger (Switzerland)

1 June 1996 International friendly	Hungary	0–2	Italy	Budapest, Hungary
20:30 CEST (UTC+02:00)		Report	Casiraghi 7'; Bánfi 47' (o.g.)	Stadium: Népstadion; Attendance: 25,000; Referee: Mateo Beusan (Croatia)

11 June 1996 UEFA Euro 1996; Group C	Italy	2–1	Russia	Liverpool, England
16:30 BST (UTC+01:00)	Casiraghi 5', 52'	Report	Tsymbalar 21'	Stadium: Anfield; Attendance: 35,120; Referee: Leslie Mottram (Scotland)

14 June 1996 UEFA Euro 1996; Group C	Czech Republic	2–1	Italy	Liverpool, England
19:30 BST (UTC+01:00)	Nedvěd 5'; Bejbl 35'	Report	Chiesa 18'	Stadium: Anfield; Attendance: 37,320; Referee: Antonio López Nieto (Spain)

19 June 1996 UEFA Euro 1996; Group C	Italy	0–0	Germany	Manchester, England
19:30 BST (UTC+01:00)		Report		Stadium: Old Trafford; Attendance: 53,740; Referee: Guy Goethals (Belgium)

5 October 1996 1998 FIFA World Cup qualification Group 2	Moldova	1–3	Italy	Chișinău, Moldova
20:15 EEST (UTC+03:00)	Curtianu 12'	Report	Ravanelli 8', 87'; Casiraghi 69'	Stadium: Stadionul Republican; Attendance: 4,085; Referee: Gerd Grabher (Austria)

9 October 1996 1998 FIFA World Cup qualification Group 2	Italy	1–0	Georgia	Perugia, Italy
20:30 CEST (UTC+03:00)	Ravanelli 43'	Report		Stadium: Stadio Renato Curi; Attendance: 14,012; Referee: Eric Blareau (Belgium)

6 November 1996 International friendly	Bosnia and Herzegovina	2–1	Italy	Sarajevo, Bosnia and Herzegovina
13:30 CET (UTC+01:00)	Salihamidžić 6'; Bolić 44'	Report	Chiesa 10'	Stadium: Koševo Stadium; Attendance: 40,000; Referee: Robert Sedlacek (Austria)

=== 1997 ===
22 January 1997^{1} International friendly	Italy	2–0	Northern Ireland	Palermo, Italy
20:45 CET (UTC+01:00)	Zola 9'; Del Piero 88'	Report		Stadium: Stadio La Favorita; Attendance: 30,866; Referee: Lutz Michael Fröhlich (Germany)

12 February 1997 1998 FIFA World Cup qualification Group 2	England	0–1	Italy	London, England
21:00 GMT (UTC±00:00)		Report	Zola 19'	Stadium: Wembley; Attendance: 75,055; Referee: Sándor Puhl (Hungary)

29 March 1997 1998 FIFA World Cup qualification Group 2	Italy	3–0	Moldova	Trieste, Italy
20:45 CET (UTC+01:00)	Maldini 24'; Zola 45'; Vieri 50'	Report		Stadium: Stadio Nereo Rocco; Attendance: 17,677; Referee: Gilles Veissière (France)

2 April 1997 1998 FIFA World Cup qualification Group 2	Poland	0–0	Italy	Chorzów, Poland
20:30 CEST (UTC+02:00)		Report		Stadium: Stadion Śląski; Attendance: 32,000; Referee: Kim Milton Nielsen (Denmark)

30 April 1997 1998 FIFA World Cup qualification Group 2	Italy	3–0	Poland	Naples, Italy
20:30 CEST (UTC+02:00)	Di Matteo 24'; Maldini 38'; R. Baggio 62'	Report		Stadium: Stadio San Paolo; Attendance: 35,327; Referee: José María García-Aranda (Spain)

4 June 1997 1997 Tournoi de France	England	2–0	Italy	Nantes, France
20:30 CEST (UTC+02:00)	Wright 26'; Scholes 43'	Report		Stadium: Stade de la Beaujoire; Attendance: 25,000; Referee: Günter Benkö (Australia)

8 June 1997 1997 Tournoi de France	Italy	3–3	Brazil	Lyon, France
20:30 CEST (UTC+02:00)	Del Piero 6', 61' (pen.); Aldair 23' (o.g.)	Report	Lombardo 35' (o.g.); Ronaldo 70'; Romário 84'	Stadium: Stade de Gerland; Attendance: 30,000; Referee: Serge Muhmenthaler (Switzerland)

11 June 1997 1997 Tournoi de France	France	2–2	Italy	Paris, France
20:45 CEST (UTC+02:00)	Zidane 12'; Djorkaeff 73'	Report	Casiraghi 61'; Del Piero 89' (pen.)	Stadium: Parc des Princes; Attendance: 35,000; Referee: Antonio Jesús López Nieto (Spain)

10 September 1997 1998 FIFA World Cup qualification Group 2	Georgia	0–0	Italy	Tbilisi, Georgia
18:00 GET (UTC+04:00)		Report		Stadium: Boris Paichadze National Stadium; Attendance: 51,117; Referee: Rune Pedersen (Norway)

11 October 1997 1998 FIFA World Cup qualification Group 2	Italy	0–0	England	Rome, Italy
20:45 CEST (UTC+02:00)		Report		Stadium: Stadio Olimpico; Attendance: 65,892; Referee: Mario van der Ende (Netherlands)

29 October 1997 1998 FIFA World Cup qualification Play-off	Russia	1–1	Italy	Moscow, Russia
18:30 MSK (UTC+03:00)	Cannavaro 52' (o.g.)	Report	Vieri 50'	Stadium: Dynamo Stadium; Attendance: 15,000; Referee: Peter Mikkelsen (Denmark)

15 November 1997 1998 FIFA World Cup qualification Play-off	Italy	1–0 (2–1 agg.)	Russia	Naples, Italy
20:45 CET (UTC+01:00)	Casiraghi 53'	Report		Stadium: Stadio San Paolo; Attendance: 69,207; Referee: Serge Muhmenthaler (Switzerland)

=== 1998 ===
28 January 1998 International friendly	Italy	3–0	Slovakia	Catania, Italy
18:00 CET (UTC+01:00)	Timko 48' (o.g.); Del Piero 53'; Di Matteo 63'	Report		Stadium: Stadio Cibali; Attendance: 23,921; Referee: Charles Agius (Malta)

22 April 1998 International friendly	Italy	3–1	Paraguay	Parma, Italy
20:45 CEST (UTC+02:00)	Maldini 4'; Moriero 17', 68'	Report	Costacurta 61' (o.g.)	Stadium: Stadio Ennio Tardini; Attendance: 25,000; Referee: Alain Sars (France)

2 June 1998 International friendly	Sweden	1–0	Italy	Gothenburg, Sweden
18:15 CEST (UTC+02:00)	Andersson 90'	Report		Stadium: Gamla Ullevi (1916); Attendance: 25,533; Referee: Terje Hauge (Norway)

11 June 1998 1998 FIFA World Cup; Group B	Italy	2–2	Chile	Bordeaux, France
17:30 CEST (UTC+02:00)	Vieri 11'; R. Baggio 84' (pen.)	Report	Salas 45+3', 48'	Stadium: Stade du Parc Lescure; Attendance: 31,800; Referee: Lucien Bouchardeau (Niger)

17 June 1998 1998 FIFA World Cup; Group B	Italy	3–0	Cameroon	Montpellier, France
21:00 CEST (UTC+02:00)	Di Biagio 7'; Vieri 75', 89'	Report		Stadium: Stade de la Mosson; Attendance: 29,800; Referee: Edward Lennie (Australia)

23 June 1998 1998 FIFA World Cup; Group B	Italy	2–1	Austria	Saint-Denis, France
16:00 CEST (UTC+02:00)	Vieri 49'; R. Baggio 89'	Report	Herzog 90' (pen.)	Stadium: Stade de France; Attendance: 80,000; Referee: Paul Durkin (England)

27 June 1998 1998 FIFA World Cup; Round of 16	Italy	1–0	Norway	Marseille, France
16:30 CEST (UTC+02:00)	Vieri 18'	Report		Stadium: Stade Vélodrome; Attendance: 55,000; Referee: Bernd Heynemann (Germany)

3 July 1998 1998 FIFA World Cup; Quarter-final	Italy	0–0 (a.e.t.) (3–4 p)	France	Saint-Denis, France
16:30 CEST (UTC+02:00)		Report		Stadium: Stade de France; Attendance: 77,000; Referee: Hugh Dallas (Scotland)
	Penalties
	R. Baggio (penalty scored); Albertini (penalty missed); Costacurta (penalty scored); Vieri (penalty scored); Di Biagio (penalty missed)		(penalty scored) Zidane; (penalty missed) Lizarazu; (penalty scored) Trezeguet; (penalty scored) Henry; (penalty scored) Blanc

5 September 1998^{1} UEFA Euro 2000 qualifying Group 1	Wales	0–2	Italy	Liverpool, England
20:45 BST (UTC+01:00)		Report	Fuser 19'; Vieri 77'	Stadium: Anfield; Attendance: 23,160; Referee: Terje Hauge (Norway)

10 October 1998 UEFA Euro 2000 qualifying Group 1	Italy	2–0	Switzerland	Udine, Italy
20:45 CEST (UTC+02:00)	Del Piero 18', 62'	Report		Stadium: Stadio Friuli; Attendance: 35,247; Referee: Alain Sars (France)

18 November 1998 International friendly	Italy	2–2	Spain	Salerno, Italy
20:45 CET (UTC+01:00)	Inzaghi 13', 74'	Report	de Pedro 33'; Raúl 82' (pen.)	Stadium: Stadio Arechi; Attendance: 17,981; Referee: Fernand Meese (Belgium)

16 December 1998 International friendly	Italy	6–2	World XI	Rome, Italy
21:00 CET (UTC+01:00)	Inzaghi 9'; Di Francesco 36'; Fuser 43'; Chiesa 57', 79', 87'	Report	Batistuta 20'; Weah 22'	Stadium: Stadio Olimpico; Attendance: 21,352; Referee: Rémi Harrel (France)

=== 1999 ===
10 February 1999 International friendly	Italy	0–0	Norway	Pisa, Italy
20:45 CET (UTC+01:00)		Report		Stadium: Arena Garibaldi; Attendance: 17,651; Referee: Manuel Mejuto González (Spain)

27 March 1999 UEFA Euro 2000 qualifying Group 1	Denmark	1–2	Italy	Copenhagen, Denmark
20:45 CET (UTC+01:00)	Sand 56'	Report	Inzaghi 1'; Conte 68'	Stadium: Parken Stadium; Attendance: 41,429; Referee: Antonio López Nieto (Spain)

31 March 1999 UEFA Euro 2000 qualifying Group 1	Italy	1–1	Belarus	Ancona, Italy
20:45 CEST (UTC+02:00)	Inzaghi 32' (pen.)	Report	Belkevich 25'	Stadium: Stadio del Conero; Attendance: 20,735; Referee: Michel Piraux (Belgium)

28 April 1999 International friendly	Croatia	0–0	Italy	Zagreb, Croatia
17:00 CEST (UTC+02:00)		Report		Stadium: Stadion Maksimir; Attendance: 10,000; Referee: Georg Dardenne (Germany)

5 June 1999 UEFA Euro 2000 qualifying Group 1	Italy	4–0	Wales	Bologna, Italy
20:45 CEST (UTC+02:00)	Vieri 7'; Inzaghi 37'; Maldini 40'; Chiesa 89'	Report		Stadium: Stadio Renato Dall'Ara; Attendance: 12,392; Referee: Edgar Steinborn (Germany)

9 June 1999 UEFA Euro 2000 qualifying Group 1	Switzerland	0–0	Italy	Lausanne, Switzerland
20:15 CEST (UTC+02:00)		Report		Stadium: Stade Olympique de la Pontaise; Attendance: 13,124; Referee: Graham Poll (England)

8 September 1999 UEFA Euro 2000 qualifying Group 1	Italy	2–3	Denmark	Naples, Italy
20:45 CEST (UTC+02:00)	Fuser 10'; Vieri 34'	Report	Jørgensen 39' (pen.); Wieghorst 58'; Tomasson 64'	Stadium: Stadio San Paolo; Attendance: 48,919; Referee: Dick Jol (Netherlands)

9 October 1999 UEFA Euro 2000 qualifying Group 1	Belarus	0–0	Italy	Minsk, Belarus
20:30 FET (UTC+03:00)		Report		Stadium: Dinamo Stadium; Attendance: 32,000; Referee: Claude Colombo (France)

13 November 1999 International friendly	Italy	1–3	Belgium	Lecce, Italy
20:45 CET (UTC+01:00)	Vanoli 26'	Report	Strupar 7'; Wilmots 69'; Goor 86'	Stadium: Stadio Via del Mare; Attendance: 9,550; Referee: Edgar Steinborn (Germany)

=== 2000 ===
23 February 2000 International friendly	Italy	1–0	Sweden	Palermo, Italy
20:30 CET (UTC+01:00)	Del Piero 81' (pen.)	Report		Stadium: Stadio La Favorita; Attendance: 17,249; Referee: Luc Huyghe (Belgium)

29 March 2000 International friendly	Spain	2–0	Italy	Barcelona, Spain
20:30 CEST (UTC+02:00)	Alfonso 61'; Abelardo 79'	Report		Stadium: Camp Nou; Attendance: 53,600; Referee: Claude Colombo (France)

26 April 2000 International friendly	Italy	2–0	Portugal	Reggio Calabria, Italy
20:45 CEST (UTC+02:00)	Iuliano 74'; Totti 88'	Report		Stadium: Stadio Oreste Granillo; Attendance: 23,199; Referee: Emanuel Zammit (Malta)

3 June 2000 International friendly	Norway	1–0	Italy	Oslo, Norway
16:00 CEST (UTC+02:00)	Carew 52'	Report		Stadium: Ullevaal Stadion; Attendance: 25,248; Referee: Graham Barber (England)

11 June 2000 UEFA Euro 2000; Group B	Turkey	1–2	Italy	Arnhem, Netherlands
14:30 CEST (UTC+02:00)	Okan 62'	Report	Conte 52'; Inzaghi 70' (pen.)	Stadium: GelreDome; Attendance: 22,500; Referee: Hugh Dallas (Scotland)

14 June 2000 UEFA Euro 2000; Group B	Italy	2–0	Belgium	Brussels, Belgium
20:45 CEST (UTC+02:00)	Totti 6'; Fiore 66'	Report		Stadium: King Baudouin Stadium; Attendance: 44,500; Referee: José María García-Aranda (Spain)

19 June 2000 UEFA Euro 2000; Group B	Italy	2–1	Sweden	Eindhoven, Netherlands
20:45 CEST (UTC+02:00)	Di Biagio 39'; Del Piero 88'	Report	Larsson 77'	Stadium: Philips Stadion; Attendance: 29,500; Referee: Vítor Melo Pereira (Portugal)

24 June 2000 UEFA Euro 2000; Quarter-final	Italy	2–0	Romania	Brussels, Belgium
20:45 CEST (UTC+02:00)	Totti 33'; Inzaghi 43'	Report		Stadium: King Baudouin Stadium; Attendance: 42,500; Referee: Vítor Melo Pereira (Portugal)

29 June 2000 UEFA Euro 2000; Semi-final	Italy	0–0 (a.e.t.) (3–1 p)	Netherlands	Amsterdam, Netherlands
18:00 CEST (UTC+02:00)		Report		Stadium: Amsterdam Arena; Attendance: 51,300; Referee: Markus Merk (Germany)
	Penalties
	Di Biagio (penalty scored); Pessotto (penalty scored); Totti (penalty scored); Maldini (penalty missed)		(penalty missed) F. De Boer; (penalty missed) Stam; (penalty scored) Kluivert; (penalty missed) Bosvelt

2 July 2000 UEFA Euro 2000; Final	France	2–1 (a.e.t.)	Italy	Rotterdam, Netherlands
20:00 CEST (UTC+02:00)	Wiltord 90+3'; Trezeguet 103'	Report	Delvecchio 55'	Stadium: Feijenoord Stadion; Attendance: 48,200; Referee: Anders Frisk (Sweden)

3 September 2000^{1} 2002 FIFA World Cup qualification Group 8	Hungary	2–2	Italy	Budapest, Hungary
20:45 CEST (UTC+02:00)	Horváth 29', 78'	Report	Inzaghi 26', 35'	Stadium: Népstadion; Attendance: 51,336; Referee: Graham Barber (England)

7 October 2000 2002 FIFA World Cup qualification Group 8	Italy	3–0	Romania	Milan, Italy
20:45 CEST (UTC+02:00)	Inzaghi 12'; Delvecchio 16'; Totti 41'	Report		Stadium: San Siro; Attendance: 54,297; Referee: Jan Wegereef (Netherlands)

11 October 2000 2002 FIFA World Cup qualification Group 8	Italy	2–0	Georgia	Ancona, Italy
20:45 CEST (UTC+02:00)	Del Piero 47' (pen.), 87' (pen.)	Report		Stadium: Stadio del Conero; Attendance: 26,000; Referee: Karl-Erik Nilsson (Sweden)

15 November 2000 International friendly	Italy	1–0	England	Turin, Italy
20:45 CET (UTC+01:00)	Gattuso 57'	Report		Stadium: Stadio delle Alpi; Attendance: 22,714; Referee: Sándor Puhl (Hungary)

=== 2001 ===
28 February 2001 International friendly	Italy	1–2	Argentina	Rome, Italy
20:45 CET (UTC+01:00)	Fiore 21'	Report	K. González 36'; Crespo 38'	Stadium: Stadio Olimpico; Attendance: 25,000; Referee: Alain Sars (France)

24 March 2001 2002 FIFA World Cup qualification Group 8	Romania	0–2	Italy	Bucharest, Romania
20:45 CET (UTC+01:00)		Report	Inzaghi 29', 33'	Stadium: Stadionul Steaua; Attendance: 24,000; Referee: Herbert Fandel (Germany)

28 March 2001 2002 FIFA World Cup qualification Group 8	Italy	4–0	Lithuania	Trieste, Italy
20:45 CEST (UTC+02:00)	Inzaghi 17', 64'; Del Piero 49', 79'	Report		Stadium: Stadio Nereo Rocco; Attendance: 14,800; Referee: Sergey Shmolik (Belarus)

25 April 2001 International friendly	Italy	1–0	South Africa	Perugia, Italy
20:45 CEST (UTC+02:00)	Montella 54'	Report		Stadium: Stadio Renato Curi; Attendance: 15,369; Referee: Massimo Busacca (Switzerland)

2 June 2001 2002 FIFA World Cup qualification Group 8	Georgia	1–2	Italy	Tbilisi, Georgia
21:00 GET (UTC+04:00)	Gakhokidze 80'	Report	Delvecchio 45'; Totti 66'	Stadium: Boris Paichadze Dinamo Arena; Attendance: 25,000; Referee: Eduardo Iturralde González (Spain)

1 September 2001 2002 FIFA World Cup qualification Group 8	Lithuania	0–0	Italy	Kaunas, Lithuania
20:45 CEST (UTC+02:00)		Report		Stadium: Darius and Girėnas Stadium; Attendance: 7,000; Referee: Mario van der Ende (Netherlands)

5 September 2001 International friendly	Italy	1–0	Morocco	Piacenza, Italy
20:45 CEST (UTC+02:00)	Tommasi 18'	Report		Stadium: Stadio Leonardo Garilli; Attendance: 19,000; Referee: Juan Ansuátegui Roca (Spain)

6 October 2001 2002 FIFA World Cup qualification Group 8	Italy	1–0	Hungary	Parma, Italy
20:45 CEST (UTC+02:00)	Del Piero 45'	Report		Stadium: Stadio Ennio Tardini; Attendance: 20,805; Referee: Epifanio González (Paraguay)

7 November 2001 International friendly	Japan	1–1	Italy	Saitama, Japan
19:20 JST (UTC+09:00)	Yanagisawa 9'	Report	Doni 50'	Stadium: Saitama Stadium 2002; Attendance: 61,833; Referee: Lu Jun (China)

=== 2002 ===
13 February 2002 International friendly	Italy	1–0	United States	Catania, Italy
20:45 CET (UTC+01:00)	Del Piero 62'	Report		Stadium: Stadio Cibali; Attendance: 25,000; Referee: Joseph Attard (Malta)

27 March 2002 International friendly	England	1–2	Italy	Leeds, England
20:00 GMT (UTC+00:00)	Fowler 63'	Report	Montella 67', 90+2' (pen.)	Stadium: Elland Road; Attendance: 36,635; Referee: Herbert Fandel (Germany)

17 April 2002 International friendly	Italy	1–1	Uruguay	Milan, Italy
20:45 CEST (UTC+02:00)	Panucci 73'	Report	Abreu 77'	Stadium: San Siro; Attendance: 16,767; Referee: Stéphane Bré (France)

18 May 2002 International friendly	Czech Republic	1–0	Italy	Prague, Czech Republic
20:45 CEST (UTC+02:00)	Šmicer 26'	Report		Stadium: Generali Arena; Attendance: 15,077; Referee: Lutz Michael Fröhlich (Germany)

3 June 2002 2002 FIFA World Cup; Group G	Italy	2–0	Ecuador	Sapporo, Japan
20:45 JST (UTC+09:00)	Vieri 7', 27'	Report		Stadium: Sapporo Dome; Attendance: 31,081; Referee: Brian Hall (United States)

8 June 2002 2002 FIFA World Cup; Group G	Italy	1–2	Croatia	Ibaraki, Japan
20:45 JST (UTC+09:00)	Vieri 55'	Report	Olić 73'; Rapaić 76'	Stadium: Kashima Soccer Stadium; Attendance: 36,472; Referee: Graham Poll (England)

13 June 2002 2002 FIFA World Cup; Group G	Mexico	1–1	Italy	Ōita, Japan
20:30 JST (UTC+09:00)	Borgetti 34'	Report	Del Piero 85'	Stadium: Kyushu Oil Dome; Attendance: 39,291; Referee: Carlos Eugênio Simon (Brazil)

18 June 2002 2002 FIFA World Cup; Round of 16	South Korea	2–1 (a.e.t.)	Italy	Daejeon, South Korea
20:30 KST (UTC+09:00)	Seol Ki-hyeon 88'; Ahn Jung-hwan 117'	Report	Vieri 18'	Stadium: Daejeon World Cup Stadium; Attendance: 38,588; Referee: Byron Moreno (Ecuador)

21 August 2002 International friendly	Italy	0–1	Slovenia	Trieste, Italy
20:45 CEST (UTC+02:00)		Report	Cimirotič 32'	Stadium: Stadio Nereo Rocco; Attendance: 11,080; Referee: Bernhard Brugger (Austria)

7 September 2002 UEFA Euro 2004 qualifying Group 7	Azerbaijan	0–2	Italy	Baku, Azerbaijan
23:00 AZST (UTC+05:00)		Report	Ahmadov 33' (o.g.); Del Piero 65'	Stadium: Tofiq Bahramov Stadium; Attendance: 40,000; Referee: Bernhard Brugger (Austria)

12 October 2002 UEFA Euro 2004 qualifying Group 7	Italy	1–1	FR Yugoslavia	Naples, Italy
20:45 CEST (UTC+02:00)	Del Piero 38'	Report	Mijatović 27'	Stadium: Stadio San Paolo; Attendance: 55,000; Referee: Manuel Mejuto González (Spain)

16 October 2002 UEFA Euro 2004 qualifying Group 7	Wales	2–1	Italy	Cardiff, Wales
20:45 BST (UTC+01:00)	Davies 11'; Bellamy 70'	Report	Del Piero 31'	Stadium: Millennium Stadium; Attendance: 55,000; Referee: Gilles Veissière (France)

20 November 2002 International friendly	Italy	1–1	Turkey	Pescara, Italy
20:45 CET (UTC+01:00)	Vieri 38'	Report	Belözoğlu 28'	Stadium: Stadio Adriatico; Attendance: 17,560; Referee: Pascal Garibian (France)

=== 2003 ===
12 February 2003 International friendly	Italy	1–0	Portugal	Genoa, Italy
21:00 CET (UTC+01:00)	Corradi 62'	Report		Stadium: Stadio Luigi Ferraris; Attendance: 31,265; Referee: Herbert Fandel (Germany)

29 March 2003 UEFA Euro 2004 qualifying Group 7	Italy	2–0	Finland	Palermo, Italy
21:00 CET (UTC+01:00)	Vieri 6', 23'	Report		Stadium: Stadio Renzo Barbera; Attendance: 34,074; Referee: Valentin Ivanov (Russia)

30 April 2003 International friendly	Switzerland	1–2	Italy	Geneva, Switzerland
21:00 CEST (UTC+02:00)	Frei 6'	Report	Legrottaglie 10'; Zanetti 76'	Stadium: Stade de Genève; Attendance: 30,000; Referee: Damien Ledentu (France)

3 June 2003 International friendly	Italy	2–0	Northern Ireland	Campobasso, Italy
20:45 CEST (UTC+02:00)	Corradi 30'; Delvecchio 66'	Report		Stadium: Stadio Nuovo Romagnoli; Attendance: 18,270; Referee: Lucillo Baptista (Portugal)

11 June 2003 UEFA Euro 2004 qualifying Group 7	Finland	0–2	Italy	Helsinki, Finland
20:00 EEST (UTC+03:00)		Report	Totti 31'; Del Piero 73'	Stadium: Helsinki Olympic Stadium; Attendance: 36,850; Referee: Željko Širić (Croatia)

20 August 2003 International friendly	Germany	0–1	Italy	Stuttgart, Germany
20:45 CEST (UTC+02:00)		Report	Vieri 17'	Stadium: Gottlieb-Daimler-Stadion; Attendance: 50,128; Referee: Kim Milton Nielsen (Denmark)

6 September 2003 UEFA Euro 2004 qualifying Group 7	Italy	4–0	Wales	Milan, Italy
20:45 CEST (UTC+02:00)	Inzaghi 59', 63', 70'; Del Piero 76' (pen.)	Report		Stadium: San Siro; Attendance: 68,000; Referee: Markus Merk (Germany)

10 September 2003 UEFA Euro 2004 qualifying Group 7	Serbia and Montenegro	1–1	Italy	Belgrade, Serbia and Montenegro
20:45 CEST (UTC+02:00)	Ilić 82'	Report	Inzaghi 22'	Stadium: Red Star Stadium; Attendance: 30,000; Referee: Alain Hamer (Luxembourg)

11 October 2003 UEFA Euro 2004 qualifying Group 7	Italy	4–0	Azerbaijan	Reggio Calabria, Italy
20:45 CEST (UTC+02:00)	Vieri 16'; Inzaghi 24', 87'; Di Vaio 64'	Report		Stadium: Stadio Oreste Granillo; Attendance: 22,100; Referee: Stuart Dougal (Scotland)

12 November 2003 International friendly	Poland	3–1	Italy	Warsaw, Poland
20:45 CET (UTC+01:00)	Bąk 6'; Kłos 17'; Krzynówek 85'	Report	Cassano 18'	Stadium: Polish Army Stadium; Attendance: 7,000; Referee: Tom Henning Øvrebø (Norway)

16 November 2003 International friendly	Italy	1–0	Romania	Ancona, Italy
20:45 CET (UTC+01:00)	Di Vaio 58'	Report		Stadium: Stadio del Conero; Attendance: 11,700; Referee: Wolfgang Stark (Germany)

=== 2004 ===
18 February 2004 International friendly	Italy	2–2	Czech Republic	Palermo, Italy
20:45 CET (UTC+01:00)	Vieri 13'; Di Natale 85'	Report	Štajner 42'; Rosický 88'	Stadium: Stadio Renzo Barbera; Attendance: 20,935; Referee: Eric Braamhaar (Netherlands)

31 March 2004 International friendly	Portugal	1–2	Italy	Braga, Portugal
22:00 WEST (UTC+01:00)	Valente 5'	Report	Vieri 40'; Miccoli 75'	Stadium: Estádio Municipal; Attendance: 25,000; Referee: Ali Aydin (Turkey)

28 April 2004 International friendly	Italy	1–1	Spain	Genoa, Italy
21:00 CEST (UTC+02:00)	Vieri 55'	Report	Fernando Torres 51'	Stadium: Stadio Luigi Ferraris; Attendance: 30,000; Referee: Graham Poll (England)

30 May 2004 International friendly	Tunisia	0–4	Italy	Radès, Tunisia
20:45 CET (UTC+01:00)		Report	Bouazizi 15' (o.g.); Cannavaro 27'; Pirlo 86'; Zambrotta 91'	Stadium: Stade Olympique; Attendance: 30,000; Referee: Laurent Duhamel (France)

14 June 2004 UEFA Euro 2004; Group C	Denmark	0–0	Italy	Guimarães, Portugal
17:00 WEST (UTC+01:00)		Report		Stadium: Estádio D. Afonso Henriques; Attendance: 29,595; Referee: Manuel Mejuto González (Spain)

18 June 2004 UEFA Euro 2004; Group C	Italy	1–1	Sweden	Porto, Portugal
19:45 WEST (UTC+01:00)	Cassano 37'	Report	Ibrahimović 85'	Stadium: Estádio do Dragão; Attendance: 44,926; Referee: Urs Meier (Switzerland)

22 June 2004 UEFA Euro 2004; Group C	Italy	2–1	Bulgaria	Guimarães, Portugal
19:45 WEST (UTC+01:00)	Perrotta 48'; Cassano 90+4'	Report	M. Petrov 45' (pen.)	Stadium: Estádio D. Afonso Henriques; Attendance: 16,002; Referee: Valentin Ivanov (Russia)

18 August 2004^{1} International friendly	Iceland	2–0	Italy	Reykjavík, Iceland
21:15 GMT (UTC±00:00)	Guðjohnsen 17'; Einarsson 19'	Report		Stadium: Laugardalsvöllur; Attendance: 20,204; Referee: Peter Fröjdfeldt (Sweden)

4 September 2004 2006 FIFA World Cup qualification Group 5	Italy	2–1	Norway	Palermo, Italy
20:45 CEST (UTC+02:00)	De Rossi 4'; Toni 80'	Report	Carew 1'	Stadium: Stadio Renzo Barbera; Attendance: 21,463; Referee: Alain Sars (France)

8 September 2004 2006 FIFA World Cup qualification Group 5	Moldova	0–1	Italy	Chișinău, Moldova
21:45 EEST (UTC+03:00)		Report	Del Piero 32'	Stadium: Stadionul Republican; Attendance: 5,200; Referee: Michal Beneš (Czech Republic)

9 October 2004 2006 FIFA World Cup qualification Group 5	Slovenia	1–0	Italy	Celje, Slovenia
21:00 EEST (UTC+03:00)	Cesar 82'	Report		Stadium: Arena Petrol; Attendance: 9,262; Referee: Frank De Bleeckere (Belgium)

13 October 2004 2006 FIFA World Cup qualification Group 5	Italy	4–3	Belarus	Parma, Italy
21:00 EEST (UTC+03:00)	Totti 26' (pen.), 74'; De Rossi 32'; Gilardino 86'	Report	Romaschenko 52', 88'; Bulyga 76'	Stadium: Stadio Ennio Tardini; Attendance: 19,833; Referee: Carlos Megía Dávila (Spain)

17 November 2004 International friendly	Italy	1–0	Finland	Messina, Italy
20:45 CET (UTC+01:00)	Miccoli 33'	Report		Stadium: Stadio San Filippo; Attendance: 7,043; Referee: Alexandru Tudor (Romania)

=== 2005 ===
9 February 2005 International friendly	Italy	2–0	Russia	Cagliari, Italy
21:00 CET (UTC+01:00)	Gilardino 56'; Barone 62'	Report		Stadium: Stadio Sant'Elia; Attendance: 15,700; Referee: Ľuboš Micheľ (Slovakia)

26 March 2005 2006 FIFA World Cup qualification Group 5	Italy	2–0	Scotland	Milan, Italy
20:45 CET (UTC+01:00)	Pirlo 35', 85'	Report		Stadium: San Siro; Attendance: 40,745; Referee: Kyros Vassaras (Greece)

30 March 2005 International friendly	Italy	0–0	Iceland	Padua, Italy
20:45 CEST (UTC+02:00)		Report		Stadium: Stadio Euganeo; Attendance: 16,697; Referee: Alain Hamer (Luxembourg)

4 June 2005 2006 FIFA World Cup qualification Group 5	Norway	0–0	Italy	Oslo, Norway
20:30 CEST (UTC+02:00)		Report		Stadium: Ullevaal Stadion; Attendance: 24,829; Referee: Manuel Mejuto González (Spain)

8 June 2005 International friendly	Serbia and Montenegro	1–1	Italy	Toronto, Canada
20:00 EDT (UTC−04:00)	Žigić 25'	Report	Lucarelli 83'	Stadium: Rogers Centre; Attendance: 22,138; Referee: Steven Depiero (Canada)

11 June 2005 International friendly	Ecuador	1–1	Italy	East Rutherford, United States
15:00 EDT (UTC−04:00)	Ayoví 18' (pen.)	Report	Toni 6'	Stadium: Giants Stadium; Attendance: 27,583; Referee: Terry Vaughn (United States)

17 August 2005 International friendly	Republic of Ireland	1–2	Italy	Dublin, Ireland
19:30 IST (UTC+01:00)	Reid 32'	Report	Pirlo 10'; Gilardino 31'	Stadium: Lansdowne Road; Attendance: 44,000; Referee: Paulo Costa (Portugal)

3 September 2005 2006 FIFA World Cup qualification Group 5	Scotland	1–1	Italy	Glasgow, Scotland
17:30 BST (UTC+01:00)	Miller 13'	Report	Grosso 75'	Stadium: Hampden Park; Attendance: 50,185; Referee: Ľuboš Micheľ (Slovakia)

7 September 2005 2006 FIFA World Cup qualification Group 5	Belarus	1–4	Italy	Minsk, Belarus
20:00 FET (UTC+03:00)	Kutuzov 4'	Report	Toni 6', 13', 55'; Camoranesi 45'	Stadium: Dinamo Stadium; Attendance: 30,299; Referee: René Temmink (Netherlands)

8 October 2005 2006 FIFA World Cup qualification Group 5	Italy	1–0	Slovenia	Palermo, Italy
21:00 CEST (UTC+02:00)	Zaccardo 78'	Report		Stadium: Stadio Renzo Barbera; Attendance: 19,123; Referee: Éric Poulat (France)

12 October 2005 2006 FIFA World Cup qualification Group 5	Italy	2–1	Moldova	Lecce, Italy
20:30 CEST (UTC+02:00)	Vieri 70'; Gilardino 85'	Report	Gațcan 76'	Stadium: Stadio Via del Mare; Attendance: 28,167; Referee: Olegário Benquerença (Portugal)

12 November 2005 International friendly	Netherlands	1–3	Italy	Amsterdam, Netherlands
20:45 CET (UTC+01:00)	Babel 37'	Report	Gilardino 40'; Vlaar 45' (o.g.); Toni 49'	Stadium: Amsterdam Arena; Attendance: 50,000; Referee: Valentin Ivanov (Russia)

16 November 2005 International friendly	Italy	1–1	Ivory Coast	Geneva, Switzerland
21:00 CET (UTC+01:00)	Diana 86'	Report	Drogba 69'	Stadium: Stade de Genève; Attendance: 15,000; Referee: Carlo Bertolini (Switzerland)

=== 2006 ===
1 March 2006 International friendly	Italy	4–1	Germany	Florence, Italy
21:00 CET (UTC+01:00)	Gilardino 4'; Toni 7'; De Rossi 39'; Del Piero 57'	Report	Huth 82'	Stadium: Stadio Artemio Franchi; Attendance: 28,317; Referee: Eduardo Iturralde González (Spain)

31 May 2006 International friendly	Switzerland	1–1	Italy	Geneva, Switzerland
20:50 CEST (UTC+02:00)	Gygax 32'	Report	Gilardino 11'	Stadium: Stade de Genève; Attendance: 30,000; Referee: Peter Sippel (Germany)

2 June 2006 International friendly	Italy	0–0	Ukraine	Lausanne, Switzerland
20:50 CEST (UTC+02:00)		Report		Stadium: Stade Olympique de la Pontaise; Attendance: 14,000; Referee: Markus Nobs (Switzerland)

12 June 2006 2006 FIFA World Cup; Group E	Italy	2–0	Ghana	Hanover, Germany
21:00 CEST (UTC+02:00)	Pirlo 40'; Iaquinta 83'	Report		Stadium: AWD-Arena; Attendance: 43,000; Referee: Carlos Eugênio Simon (Brazil)

17 June 2006 2006 FIFA World Cup; Group E	Italy	1–1	United States	Kaiserslautern, Germany
21:00 CEST (UTC+02:00)	Gilardino 22'	Report	Zaccardo 27' (o.g.)	Stadium: Fritz-Walter-Stadion; Attendance: 46,000; Referee: Jorge Larrionda (Uruguay)

22 June 2006 2006 FIFA World Cup; Group E	Czech Republic	0–2	Italy	Hamburg, Germany
16:00 CEST (UTC+02:00)		Report	Materazzi 26'; Inzaghi 87'	Stadium: FIFA World Cup Stadium, Hamburg; Attendance: 50,000; Referee: Benito Archundia (Mexico)

26 June 2006 2006 FIFA World Cup; Round of 16	Italy	1–0	Australia	Kaiserslautern, Germany
17:00 CEST (UTC+02:00)	Totti 90+5' (pen.)	Report		Stadium: Fritz-Walter-Stadion; Attendance: 46,000; Referee: Luis Medina Cantalejo (Spain)

30 June 2006 2006 FIFA World Cup; Quarter-final	Italy	3–0	Ukraine	Hamburg, Germany
21:00 CEST (UTC+02:00)	Zambrotta 6'; Toni 59', 69'	Report		Stadium: FIFA World Cup Stadium, Hamburg; Attendance: 50,000; Referee: Frank De Bleeckere (Belgium)

4 July 2006 2006 FIFA World Cup; Semi-final	Germany	0–2 (a.e.t.)	Italy	Dortmund, Germany
21:00 CEST (UTC+02:00)		Report	Grosso 119'; Del Piero 120+1'	Stadium: FIFA World Cup Stadium, Dortmund; Attendance: 65,000; Referee: Benito Archundia (Mexico)

9 July 2006 2006 FIFA World Cup; Final	Italy	1–1 (a.e.t.) (5–3 p)	France	Berlin, Germany
20:00 CEST (UTC+02:00)	Materazzi 19'	Report	Zidane 7' (pen.)	Stadium: Olympiastadion; Attendance: 69,000; Referee: Horacio Elizondo (Argentina)
	Penalties
	Pirlo (penalty scored); Materazzi (penalty scored); De Rossi (penalty scored); Del Piero (penalty scored); Grosso (penalty scored)		(penalty scored) Wiltord; (penalty missed) Trezeguet; (penalty scored) Abidal; (penalty scored) Sagnol

16 August 2006^{1} International friendly	Italy	0–2	Croatia	Livorno, Italy
20:50 CEST (UTC+02:00)		Report	Eduardo 28'; Modrić 42'	Stadium: Stadio Armando Picchi; Attendance: 16,150; Referee: Knut Kircher (Germany)

2 September 2006 UEFA Euro 2008 qualifying Group B	Italy	1–1	Lithuania	Naples, Italy
20:50 CEST (UTC+02:00)	Inzaghi 30'	Report	Danilevičius 21'	Stadium: Stadio San Paolo; Attendance: 60,000; Referee: Martin Hansson (Sweden)

6 September 2006 UEFA Euro 2008 qualifying Group B	France	3–1	Italy	Saint-Denis, France
21:00 CEST (UTC+02:00)	Govou 2', 57'; Henry 17'	Report	Gilardino 20'	Stadium: Stade de France; Attendance: 78,831; Referee: Herbert Fandel (Germany)

7 October 2006 UEFA Euro 2008 qualifying Group B	Italy	2–0	Ukraine	Rome, Italy
20:50 CEST (UTC+02:00)	Oddo 68' (pen.); Toni 79'	Report		Stadium: Stadio Olimpico; Attendance: 49,149; Referee: Kyros Vassaras (Greece)

11 October 2006 UEFA Euro 2008 qualifying Group B	Georgia	1–3	Italy	Tbilisi, Georgia
20:00 GET (UTC+04:00)	Shashiashvili 25'	Report	De Rossi 22'; Camoranesi 61'; Perrotta 71'	Stadium: Boris Paichadze National Stadium; Attendance: 52,000; Referee: Mike Riley (England)

15 November 2006 International friendly	Italy	1–1	Turkey	Bergamo, Italy
20:50 CET (UTC+01:00)	Di Natale 39'	Report	Materazzi 42' (o.g.)	Stadium: Stadio Atleti Azzurri d'Italia; Attendance: 24,386; Referee: Massimo Busacca (Switzerland)

=== 2007 ===
28 March 2007 UEFA Euro 2008 qualifying Group B	Italy	2–0	Scotland	Bari, Italy
20:50 CEST (UTC+02:00)	Toni 12', 70'	Report		Stadium: Stadio San Nicola; Attendance: 37,500; Referee: Frank De Bleeckere (Belgium)

2 June 2007 UEFA Euro 2008 qualifying Group B	Faroe Islands	1–2	Italy	Tórshavn, Faroe Islands
19:45 WEST (UTC+01:00)	R. Jacobsen 77'	Report	Inzaghi 12', 48'	Stadium: Tórsvøllur; Attendance: 5,987; Referee: Robert Małek (Poland)

6 June 2007 UEFA Euro 2008 qualifying Group B	Lithuania	0–2	Italy	Kaunas, Lithuania
21:45 EEST (UTC+03:00)		Report	Quagliarella 31', 45'	Stadium: Darius and Girėnas Stadium; Attendance: 8,000; Referee: Pieter Vink (Netherlands)

22 August 2007 International friendly	Hungary	3–1	Italy	Budapest, Hungary
20:45 CEST (UTC+02:00)	Juhász 61'; Gera 66' (pen.); Feczesin 77'	Report	Di Natale 48'	Stadium: Ferenc Puskás Stadium; Attendance: 34,906; Referee: Manuel Mejuto González (Spain)

8 September 2007 UEFA Euro 2008 qualifying Group B	Italy	0–0	France	Milan, Italy
20:50 CEST (UTC+02:00)		Report		Stadium: San Siro; Attendance: 81,200; Referee: Ľuboš Micheľ (Slovakia)

12 September 2007 UEFA Euro 2008 qualifying Group B	Ukraine	1–2	Italy	Kyiv, Ukraine
21:45 EEST (UTC+03:00)	Shevchenko 71'	Report	Di Natale 41', 77'	Stadium: Olimpiyskiy National Sports Complex; Attendance: 41,500; Referee: Howard Webb (England)

13 October 2007 UEFA Euro 2008 qualifying Group B	Italy	2–0	Georgia	Genoa, Italy
20:50 CEST (UTC+02:00)	Pirlo 44'; Grosso 84'	Report		Stadium: Stadio Luigi Ferraris; Attendance: 23,057; Referee: Carlos Megía Dávila (Spain)

17 October 2007 International friendly	Italy	2–0	South Africa	Siena, Italy
20:50 CEST (UTC+02:00)	Lucarelli 82', 90'	Report		Stadium: Stadio Artemio Franchi – Montepaschi Arena; Attendance: 7,219; Referee: Michael Weiner (Germany)

17 November 2007 UEFA Euro 2008 qualifying Group B	Scotland	1–2	Italy	Glasgow, Scotland
17:00 GMT (UTC±00:00)	Ferguson 65'	Report	Toni 2'; Panucci 90+1'	Stadium: Hampden Park; Attendance: 51,301; Referee: Manuel Mejuto González (Spain)

21 November 2007 UEFA Euro 2008 qualifying Group B	Italy	3–1	Faroe Islands	Modena, Italy
20:30 CET (UTC+01:00)	Benjaminsen 11' (o.g.); Toni 36'; Chiellini 41'	Report	R. Jacobsen 83'	Stadium: Stadio Alberto Braglia; Attendance: 16,142; Referee: Florian Meyer (Germany)

=== 2008 ===
6 February 2008 International friendly	Italy	3–1	Portugal	Zürich, Switzerland
20:50 CET (UTC+01:00)	Toni 45'; Cannavaro 50'; Quagliarella 79'	Report	Quaresma 77'	Stadium: Letzigrund; Attendance: 30,500; Referee: Sascha Kever (Switzerland)

26 March 2008 International friendly	Spain	1–0	Italy	Elche, Spain
21:00 CET (UTC+01:00)	Villa 77'	Report		Stadium: Estadio Manuel Martínez Valero; Attendance: 38,000; Referee: Fritz Stuchlik (Austria)

30 May 2008 International friendly	Italy	3–1	Belgium	Florence, Italy
20:50 CEST (UTC+02:00)	Di Natale 9', 41'; Camoranesi 49'	Report	Sonck 90+2'	Stadium: Stadio Artemio Franchi; Attendance: 12,500; Referee: Martin Atkinson (England)

9 June 2008 UEFA Euro 2008; Group C	Netherlands	3–0	Italy	Bern, Switzerland
20:45 CEST (UTC+02:00)	Van Nistelrooy 26'; Sneijder 31'; Van Bronckhorst 79'	Report		Stadium: Stade de Suisse; Attendance: 30,777; Referee: Peter Fröjdfeldt (Sweden)

13 June 2008 UEFA Euro 2008; Group C	Italy	1–1	Romania	Zürich, Switzerland
18:00 CEST (UTC+02:00)	Panucci 56'	Report	Mutu 55'	Stadium: Letzigrund; Attendance: 30,585; Referee: Tom Henning Øvrebø (Norway)

17 June 2008 UEFA Euro 2008; Group C	France	0–2	Italy	Zürich, Switzerland
20:45 CEST (UTC+02:00)		Report	Pirlo 25' (pen.); De Rossi 62'	Stadium: Letzigrund; Attendance: 30,585; Referee: Ľuboš Micheľ (Slovakia)

22 June 2008 UEFA Euro 2008; Quarter-final	Spain	0–0 (a.e.t.) (4–2 p)	Italy	Vienna, Austria
20:45 CEST (UTC+02:00)		Report		Stadium: Ernst-Happel-Stadion; Attendance: 48,000; Referee: Herbert Fandel (Germany)
	Penalties
	Villa (penalty scored); Cazorla (penalty scored); Senna (penalty scored); Güiza (penalty missed); Fàbregas (penalty scored)		(penalty scored) Grosso; (penalty missed) De Rossi; (penalty scored) Camoranesi; (penalty missed) Di Natale

20 August 2008^{1} International friendly	Austria	2–2	Italy	Nice, France
20:45 CEST (UTC+02:00)	Pogaterz 14'; Janko 39'	Report	Gilardino 45+1'; Özcan 67' (o.g.)	Stadium: Stade du Ray; Attendance: 14,000; Referee: Bruno Coué (France)

6 September 2008 2010 FIFA World Cup qualification Group 8	Cyprus	1–2	Italy	Larnaca, Cyprus
21:45 EEST (UTC+03:00)	Aloneftis 28'	Report	Di Natale 8', 90+2'	Stadium: Antonis Papadopoulos Stadium; Attendance: 6,000; Referee: Pieter Vink (Netherlands)

10 September 2008 2010 FIFA World Cup qualification Group 8	Italy	2–0	Georgia	Udine, Italy
20:50 CEST (UTC+02:00)	De Rossi 17', 89'	Report		Stadium: Stadio Friuli; Attendance: 27,164; Referee: Thomas Einwaller (Austria)

11 October 2008 2010 FIFA World Cup qualification Group 8	Bulgaria	0–0	Italy	Sofia, Bulgaria
21:15 EEST (UTC+03:00)		Report		Stadium: Vasil Levski National Stadium; Attendance: 35,000; Referee: Stéphane Lannoy (France)

15 October 2008 2010 FIFA World Cup qualification Group 8	Italy	2–1	Montenegro	Lecce, Italy
20:50 CEST (UTC+02:00)	Aquilani 8', 29'	Report	Vučinić 19'	Stadium: Stadio Via del Mare; Attendance: 20,162; Referee: Pedro Proença (Portugal)

19 November 2008 International friendly	Italy	1–1	Greece	Athens, Greece
21:30 EET (UTC+02:00)	Toni 54'	Report	Gekas 50'	Stadium: Karaiskakis Stadium; Attendance: 7,000; Referee: Howard Webb (England)

=== 2009 ===
10 February 2009 International friendly	Brazil	2–0	Italy	London, England
19:45 GMT (UTC±00:00)	Elano 13'; Robinho 27'	Report		Stadium: Emirates Stadium; Attendance: 60,077; Referee: Howard Webb (England)

28 March 2009 2010 FIFA World Cup qualification Group 8	Montenegro	0–2	Italy	Podgorica, Montenegro
20:45 CET (UTC+01:00)		Report	Pirlo 11' (pen.); Pazzini 73'	Stadium: Stadion Pod Goricom; Attendance: 10,500; Referee: Martin Atkinson (England)

1 April 2009 2010 FIFA World Cup qualification Group 8	Italy	1–1	Republic of Ireland	Bari, Italy
20:50 CEST (UTC+02:00)	Iaquinta 10'	Report	Keane 87'	Stadium: Stadio San Nicola; Attendance: 48,000; Referee: Wolfgang Stark (Germany)

6 June 2009 International friendly	Italy	3–0	Northern Ireland	Pisa, Italy
20:50 CEST (UTC+02:00)	Rossi 20'; Foggia 53'; Pellissier 73'	Report		Stadium: Arena Garibaldi – Stadio Romeo Anconetani; Attendance: 8,000; Referee: Kevin Blom (Netherlands)

10 June 2009 International friendly	Italy	4–3	New Zealand	Pretoria, South Africa
20:50 SAST (UTC+02:00)	Gilardino 33', 48'; Iaquinta 68', 72'	Report	Smeltz 13'; Killen 42', 57' (pen.)	Stadium: Super Stadium; Attendance: 8,000; Referee: Daniel Bennett (South Africa)

15 June 2009 2009 FIFA Confederations Cup; Group B	United States	1–3	Italy	Pretoria, South Africa
20:30 SAST (UTC+02:00)	Donovan 41' (pen.)	Report	Rossi 58', 90+4'; De Rossi 72'	Stadium: Loftus Versfeld Stadium; Attendance: 34,341; Referee: Pablo Pozo (Chile)

18 June 2009 2009 FIFA Confederations Cup; Group B	Egypt	1–0	Italy	Johannesburg, South Africa
20:30 SAST (UTC+02:00)	Homos 40'	Report		Stadium: Ellis Park Stadium; Attendance: 52,150; Referee: Martin Hansson (Sweden)

21 June 2009 2009 FIFA Confederations Cup; Group B	Italy	0–3	Brazil	Pretoria, South Africa
20:30 SAST (UTC+02:00)		Report	Luís Fabiano 37', 43'; Dossena 45' (o.g.)	Stadium: Loftus Versfeld Stadium; Attendance: 41,195; Referee: Benito Archundia (Mexico)

21 August 2009 International friendly	Switzerland	0–0	Italy	Basel, Switzerland
20:45 CEST (UTC+02:00)		Report		Stadium: St. Jakob-Park; Attendance: 31,500; Referee: Knut Kircher (Germany)

5 September 2009 2010 FIFA World Cup qualification Group 8	Georgia	0–2	Italy	Tbilisi, Georgia
22:00 GET (UTC+04:00)		Report	Kaladze 57', 67' (o.g.)	Stadium: Boris Paichadze Dinamo Arena; Attendance: 32,000; Referee: Marcin Borski (Poland)

9 September 2009 2010 FIFA World Cup qualification Group 8	Italy	2–0	Bulgaria	Turin, Italy
20:45 CEST (UTC+02:00)	Grosso 11'; Iaquinta 40'	Report		Stadium: Stadio Olimpico; Attendance: 26,122; Referee: Florian Meyer (Germany)

10 October 2009 2010 FIFA World Cup qualification Group 8	Republic of Ireland	2–2	Italy	Dublin, Ireland
20:00 WEST (UTC+1)	Whelan 8'; St Ledger 87'	Report	Camoranesi 26'; Gilardino 90'	Stadium: Croke Park; Attendance: 70,640; Referee: Terje Hauge (Norway)

14 October 2009 2010 FIFA World Cup qualification Group 8	Italy	3–2	Cyprus	Parma, Italy
20:00 CEST (UTC+02:00)	Gilardino 77', 81', 90+2'	Report	Okkas 12'; Michael 48'	Stadium: Stadio Ennio Tardini; Attendance: 15,009; Referee: Alon Yefet (Israel)

14 November 2009 International friendly	Italy	0–0	Netherlands	Pescara, Italy
20:50 CET (UTC+01:00)		Report		Stadium: Stadio Adriatico – Giovanni Cornacchia; Attendance: 17,134; Referee: Claudio Circhetta (Switzerland)

18 November 2009 International friendly	Italy	1–0	Sweden	Cesena, Italy
20:50 CET (UTC+01:00)	Chiellini 29'	Report		Stadium: Stadio Dino Manuzzi; Attendance: 22,827; Referee: Damir Skomina (Slovenia)

^{1}Indicates new coach
