= UEFA Euro 1992 qualifying Group 7 =

Standings and results for Group 7 of the UEFA Euro 1992 qualifying tournament

Standings and results for Group 7 of the UEFA Euro 1992 qualifying tournament.

Group 7 consisted of England, Poland, the Republic of Ireland and Turkey.

== Final table ==
Pos	Team	Pld	W	D	L	GF	GA	GD	Pts	Qualification	(England)	(Republic of Ireland)	(Poland)	(Turkey)
1	England	6	3	3	0	7	3	+4	9	Qualify for final tournament	—	1–1	2–0	1–0
2	Republic of Ireland	6	2	4	0	13	6	+7	8		1–1	—	0–0	5–0
3	Poland	6	2	3	1	8	6	+2	7		1–1	3–3	—	3–0
4	Turkey	6	0	0	6	1	14	−13	0		0–1	1–3	0–1	—

Source: UEFA
Rules for classification: Qualification tiebreakers

== Results ==
17 October 1990
15:00 UTC+1

Republic of Ireland	5–0	Turkey
Aldridge 15', 58', 73'; O'Leary 40'; Quinn 66'	Report

Lansdowne Road, Dublin
Attendance: 42,603
Referee: Erik Fredriksson (Sweden)
17 October 1990
20:00 UTC+1

England	2–0	Poland
Lineker 39' (pen.); Beardsley 89'	Report

Wembley Stadium, London
Attendance: 69,353
Referee: Tullio Lanese (Italy)

14 November 1990
13:30 UTC+0

Republic of Ireland	1–1	England
Cascarino 79'	Report	Platt 67'

Lansdowne Road, Dublin
Attendance: 45,494
Referee: Pietro D'Elia (Italy)
14 November 1990
19:00 UTC+2

Turkey	0–1	Poland
	Report	Dziekanowski 37'

BJK İnönü Stadium, Istanbul
Attendance: 48,680
Referee: Alexey Spirin (Soviet Union)

27 March 1991
20:00 UTC+0

England	1–1	Republic of Ireland
Dixon 9'	Report	Quinn 29'

Wembley Stadium, London
Attendance: 77,753
Referee: Kurt Röthlisberger (Switzerland)

17 April 1991
20:00 UTC+2

Poland	3–0	Turkey
Tarasiewicz 72', 80'; Kosecki 87'	Report

Polish Army Stadium, Warsaw
Attendance: 1,061
Referee: Mircea-Lucian Salomir (Romania)

1 May 1991
14:00 UTC+1

Republic of Ireland	0–0	Poland
	Report

Lansdowne Road, Dublin
Attendance: 45,795
Referee: John Blankenstein (Netherlands)
1 May 1991
18:00 UTC+3

Turkey	0–1	England
	Report	Wise 32'

Atatürk Stadium, İzmir
Attendance: 12,316
Referee: Wolf-Günter Wiesel (Germany)

16 October 1991
17:00 UTC+2

Poland	3–3	Republic of Ireland
Czachowski 59'; Furtok 77'; Urban 86'	Report	McGrath 12'; Townsend 64'; Cascarino 68'

Stadion Miejski, Poznań
Attendance: 17,600
Referee: Guy Goethals (Belgium)
16 October 1991
20:00 UTC+1

England	1–0	Turkey
Smith 21'	Report

Wembley Stadium, London
Attendance: 50,896
Referee: Antonio Martín Navarrete (Spain)

13 November 1991
18:30 UTC+1

Poland	1–1	England
Szewczyk 32'	Report	Lineker 77'

Stadion Miejski, Poznań
Attendance: 10,300
Referee: Hubert Forstinger (Austria)
13 November 1991
19:30 UTC+2

Turkey	1–3	Republic of Ireland
Çalımbay 13' (pen.)	Report	Byrne 8', 58'; Cascarino 55'

BJK İnönü Stadium, Istanbul
Attendance: 33,061
Referee: Zoran Petrović (Yugoslavia)

== Goalscorers ==
There were 29 goals scored in 12 matches, for an average of 2.42 goals per match.

3 goals

- (Republic of Ireland) John Aldridge
- (Republic of Ireland) Tony Cascarino

2 goals

- (England) Gary Lineker
- (Poland) Ryszard Tarasiewicz
- (Republic of Ireland) John Byrne
- (Republic of Ireland) Niall Quinn

1 goal

- (England) Peter Beardsley
- (England) Lee Dixon
- (England) David Platt
- (England) Alan Smith
- (England) Dennis Wise
- (Poland) Piotr Czachowski
- (Poland) Dariusz Dziekanowski
- (Poland) Jan Furtok
- (Poland) Roman Kosecki
- (Poland) Roman Szewczyk
- (Poland) Jan Urban
- (Republic of Ireland) Paul McGrath
- (Republic of Ireland) David O'Leary
- (Republic of Ireland) Andy Townsend
- (Turkey) Rıza Çalımbay
