= Sverkersson =

Sverkersson is a surname. Notable people with the surname include:

- Burislev Sverkersson or Boleslaw of Sweden, son of Sverker the Elder, King of Sweden and his second wife Richeza of Poland
- Johan I Sverkersson or John I of Sweden (1201–1222), Swedish king elected in 1216
- Karl Sverkersson or Charles VII of Sweden (1130–1167), ruler of Gothenland, and then King of Sweden from circa 1161 to 1167
- Sune Sik Sverkersson or Sune Sik (born 1154), allegedly a Swedish prince

== See also ==
- Sverkerson
- Sverrisson
