= UEFA Euro 1992 qualifying Group 6 =

Football tournament qualifying stage

Standings and results for Group 6 of the UEFA Euro 1992 qualifying tournament.

Group 6 consisted of Finland, Greece, Netherlands, Malta and Portugal.

== Final table ==
Pos	Team	Pld	W	D	L	GF	GA	GD	Pts	Qualification	(Netherlands)	(Portugal)	(Greece)	(Finland)	(Malta)
1	Netherlands	8	6	1	1	17	2	+15	13	Qualify for final tournament	—	1–0	2–0	2–0	1–0
2	Portugal	8	5	1	2	11	4	+7	11		1–0	—	1–0	1–0	5–0
3	Greece	8	3	2	3	11	9	+2	8		0–2	3–2	—	2–0	4–0
4	Finland	8	1	4	3	5	8	−3	6		1–1	0–0	1–1	—	2–0
5	Malta	8	0	2	6	2	23	−21	2		0–8	0–1	1–1	1–1	—

Source: UEFA
Rules for classification: Qualification tiebreakers

== Results ==
12 September 1990
19:00 UTC+3

Finland	0–0	Portugal
	Report

Olympic Stadium, Helsinki
Attendance: 10,242
Referee: Jozef Marko (Czechoslovakia)

17 October 1990
21:00 UTC+1

Portugal	1–0	Netherlands
Águas 54'	Report

Estádio das Antas, Porto
Attendance: 17,198
Referee: Siegfried Kirschen (Germany)

31 October 1990
18:00 UTC+2

Greece	4–0	Malta
Tsiantakis 37'; Karapialis 40'; Saravakos 59'; Borbokis 88'	Report

Olympic Stadium, Athens
Attendance: 7,768
Referee: Ion Crăciunescu (Romania)

21 November 1990
18:00 UTC+1

Netherlands	2–0	Greece
Bergkamp 7' van Basten 18'	Report

De Kuip, Rotterdam
Attendance: 20,233
Referee: Lajos Nemeth (Hungary)

25 November 1990
14:30 UTC+1

Malta	1–1	Finland
Suda 37'	Report	Holmgren 87'

Ta' Qali Stadium, Ta' Qali
Attendance: 8,667
Referee: Sadik Deda (Turkey)

19 December 1990
14:30 UTC+1

Malta	0–8	Netherlands
	Report	van Basten 9', 20', 23', 64', 80' (pen.); Winter 53'; Bergkamp 60', 66'

Ta' Qali Stadium, Ta' Qali
Attendance: 10,254
Referee: Rolf Blattmann (Switzerland)

23 January 1991
18:30 UTC+2

Greece	3–2	Portugal
Borbokis 7'; Manolas 68'; Tsalouchidis 85'	Report	Águas 18'; Futre 62'

Olympic Stadium, Athens
Attendance: 8,553
Referee: Carlo Longhi (Italy)

9 February 1991
15:15 UTC+1

Malta	0–1	Portugal
	Report	Futre 27'

Ta' Qali Stadium, Ta' Qali
Attendance: 3,264
Referee: Manfred Neuner (Germany)

20 February 1991
21:30 UTC+0

Portugal	5–0	Malta
Águas 5'; Leal 34'; Paneira 41' (pen.); Scerri 48' (o.g.); Cadete 81'	Report

Estádio das Antas, Porto
Attendance: 5,303
Referee: John Spillane (Republic of Ireland)

13 March 1991
20:00 UTC+1

Netherlands	1–0	Malta
van Basten 31' (pen.)	Report

De Kuip, Rotterdam
Attendance: 36,383
Referee: Dušan Krchnák (Czechoslovakia)

17 April 1991
20:00 UTC+2

Netherlands	2–0	Finland
van Basten 9'; Gullit 76'	Report

De Kuip, Rotterdam
Attendance: 21,426
Referee: Jan Damgaard (Denmark)

16 May 1991
19:00 UTC+3

Finland	2–0	Malta
Järvinen 51'; Litmanen 87'	Report

Olympic Stadium, Helsinki
Attendance: 5,150
Referee: Rune Pedersen (Norway)

5 June 1991
19:00 UTC+3

Finland	1–1	Netherlands
Holmgren 77'	Report	de Boer 60'

Olympic Stadium, Helsinki
Attendance: 21,207
Referee: Brian McGinlay (Scotland)

11 September 1991
21:30 UTC+1

Portugal	1–0	Finland
César Brito 22'	Report

Estádio das Antas, Porto
Attendance: 7,236
Referee: Arturo Martino (Switzerland)

9 October 1991
19:00 UTC+3

Finland	1–1	Greece
Ukkonen 50'	Report	Tsalouchidis 74'

Olympic Stadium, Helsinki
Attendance: 5,225
Referee: Sergei Khusainov (Soviet Union)

16 October 1991
20:00 UTC+2

Netherlands	1–0	Portugal
Witschge 20'	Report

De Kuip, Rotterdam
Attendance: 40,057
Referee: George Courtney (England)

30 October 1991
18:00 UTC+2

Greece	2–0	Finland
Saravakos 49'; Borbokis 51'	Report

Olympic Stadium, Athens
Attendance: 9,036
Referee: Gerhard Kapl (Austria)

20 November 1991
21:30 UTC+0

Portugal	1–0	Greece
Pinto 17'	Report

Estádio da Luz, Lisbon
Attendance: 2,098
Referee: Alphonse Costantin (Belgium)

4 December 1991
18:00 UTC+2

Greece	0–2	Netherlands
	Report	Bergkamp 37'; Blind 87'

Kaftanzoglio Stadium, Thessaloniki
Attendance: 25,053
Referee: Bo Karlsson (Sweden)

22 December 1991
14:30 UTC+1

Malta	1–1	Greece
Sultana 42'	Report	Marinakis 67'

Ta' Qali Stadium, Ta' Qali
Attendance: 6,690
Referee: Michel Girard (France)

== Goalscorers ==
There were 46 goals scored in 20 matches, for an average of 2.3 goals per match.

8 goals

- (Netherlands national football team) Marco van Basten

4 goals

- (Netherlands national football team) Dennis Bergkamp

3 goals

- (Greece national football team) Stefanos Borbokis
- (Portugal national football team) Rui Águas
- (Portugal national football team) Paulo Futre

2 goals

- (Finland national football team) Erik Holmgren
- (Greece national football team) Dimitris Saravakos
- (Greece national football team) Panagiotis Tsalouchidis

1 goal

- (Finland national football team) Petri Järvinen
- (Finland national football team) Jari Litmanen
- (Finland national football team) Kari Ukkonen
- (Greece national football team) Vassilis Karapialis
- (Greece national football team) Stelios Manolas
- (Greece national football team) Petros Marinakis
- (Greece national football team) Nikos Tsiantakis
- (Malta national football team) Hubert Suda
- (Malta national football team) Stefan Sultana
- (Netherlands national football team) Danny Blind
- (Netherlands national football team) Frank de Boer
- (Netherlands national football team) Ruud Gullit
- (Netherlands national football team) Aron Winter
- (Netherlands national football team) Richard Witschge
- (Portugal national football team) César Brito
- (Portugal national football team) Jorge Cadete
- (Portugal national football team) José Leal
- (Portugal national football team) Vítor Paneira
- (Portugal national football team) João Vieira Pinto
