= Severson =

Severson is a surname. The following notable people have this surname:

- Ben Severson (born 1964), pioneer in the sport of bodyboarding and Sandy Beach local
- Cam Severson (born 1978), Canadian professional ice hockey centre
- Damon Severson (born 1994), Canadian ice hockey player
- Dan Severson (born 1954), American politician
- Edward Louis Severson (born 1964), American musician and singer-songwriter
- Erik Severson (born 1974), Wisconsin politician and legislator
- Glen A. Severson (born 1949), former justice of the South Dakota Supreme Court
- Herman J. Severson (1869–1950), Wisconsin politician and jurist
- Jeff Severson (born 1949), former American football safety in the National Football League
- John Severson (1933–2017), American editor, author, filmmaker and artist
- Kim Severson (born 1961), writer at the New York Times
- Kimberly Severson (born 1973), international equestrian
- Paul Severson (1928–2007), American music arranger and composer
- Rich Severson (1945–2016), former Major League Baseball shortstop
- Richard Severson, Brigadier General in the United States Air Force

== See also ==
- Severson Lake or Blue Earth County, Minnesota, county located in the U.S. state of Minnesota
- Severs (disambiguation)
- Severus (disambiguation)
- Sverrisson
