= UEFA Euro 1992 qualifying =

Tournament details
- Dates: 30 May 1990 – 22 December 1991
- Teams: 33 (Note: 34 teams entered the competition: due to German reunification on 3 October 1990, West Germany's place was taken by unified Germany, while East Germany were withdrawn as they had ceased to exist.)

Tournament statistics
- Matches played: 123
- Goals scored: 333 (2.71 per match)
- Top scorer: (Socialist Federal Republic of Yugoslavia) Darko Pančev (10 goals)

The qualifying competition for UEFA Euro 1992 was a series of parallel association football competitions to be held over 1990 and 1991 to decide the qualifiers for UEFA Euro 1992, to be held in Sweden. The draw for the qualifying rounds was held on 2 February 1990.

There were a total of seven groups. At the conclusion of qualifying, the team at the top of each group qualified for the final tournament, to join the hosts in completing the eight participants. This was the last European Championship to feature eight teams, as the competition was expanded to 16 teams for 1996.

== Qualified teams ==
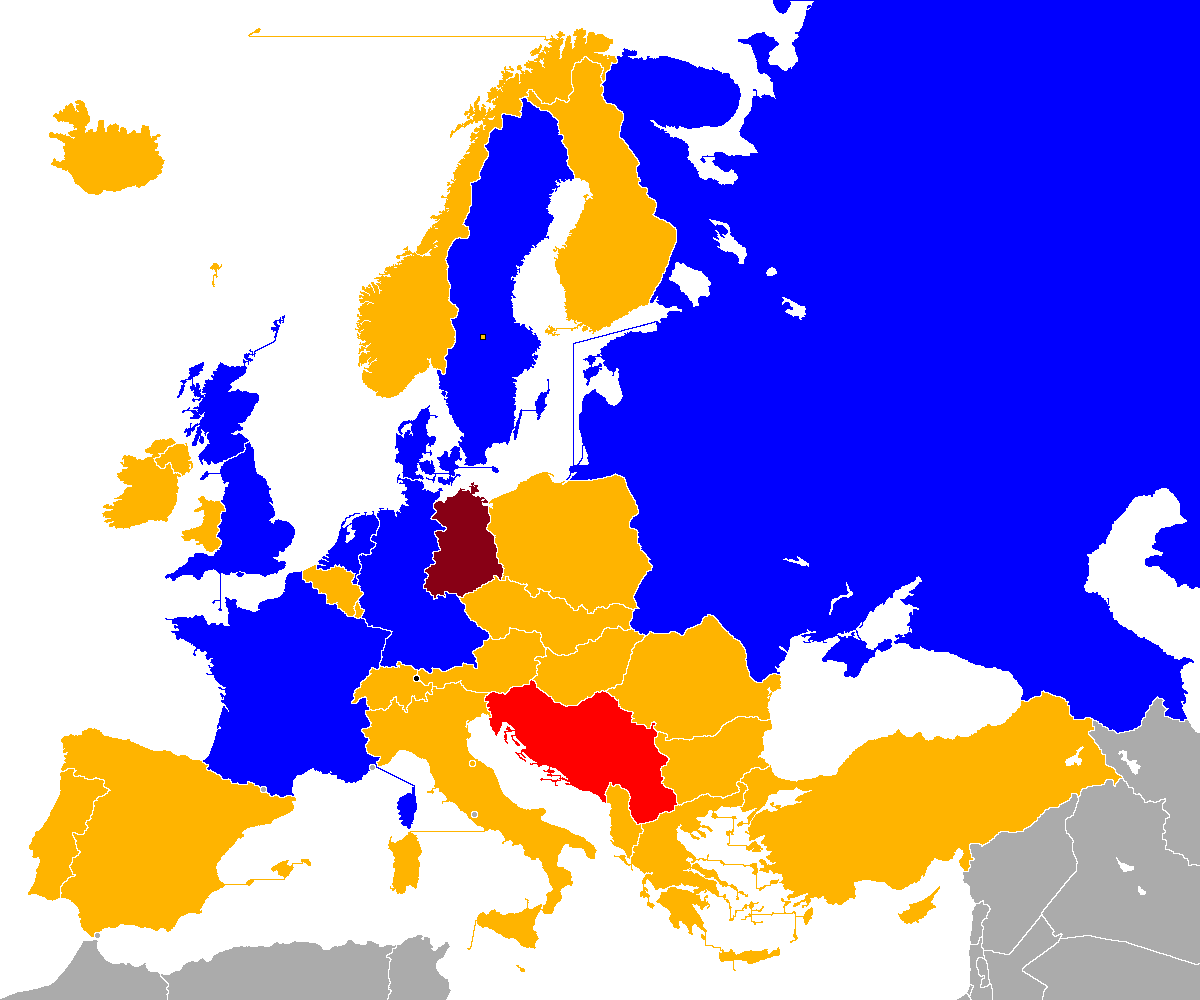
Qualified for the tournament Expelled after qualification Did not qualify Withdrew before playing any matches Did not enter Not a UEFA member

Team	Qualified as	Qualified on	Previous appearances in tournament (Note: Bold indicates champion for that year. Italic indicates host for that year.)
Sweden	Host	16 December 1988	0 (debut)
France	Group 1 winner	12 October 1991	2 (1960, **1984**)
England	Group 7 winner	13 November 1991	3 (1968, 1980, 1988)
CIS (Note: From 1960 to 1988, CIS competed as the Soviet Union.)	Group 3 winner (Note: Replaced the Soviet Union.)	13 November 1991	5 (**1960**, 1964, 1968, 1972, 1988)
Scotland	Group 2 winner	20 November 1991	0 (debut)
Netherlands	Group 6 winner	4 December 1991	3 (1976, 1980, **1988**)
Germany (Note: From 1972 to 1988, Germany competed as West Germany.)	Group 5 winner	18 December 1991	5 (**1972**, 1976, **1980**, 1984, 1988)
Denmark	Group 4 runner-up (Note: Replaced FR Yugoslavia (after qualifying as Yugoslavia), who were subject to sanctions under UN Security Council Resolution 757 and thus banned from appearing.)	31 May 1992	3 (1964, 1984, 1988)

== Seedings ==
The draw took place on 2 February 1990. Sweden qualified automatically as hosts of the competition, and 34 teams entered the draw, with the Faroe Islands and San Marino participating in a European qualifying tournament for the first time.

As initially made, the draw placed East Germany and West Germany in the same qualifying group; this would have been the first time the two sides had met since the 1974 World Cup. However, following German reunification on 3 October 1990, the East German team was withdrawn and its fixtures scrapped, while the unified German team took over the fixtures of West Germany.

The qualifiers thus consisted of 33 teams divided into seven groups (two of four teams and five of five teams) were played in 1990 and 1991. Each group winner progressed to the finals. This was the last European Championship qualifying phase which awarded two points for a win; from 1996 onward, teams earned 3 points for a win.

Pool 1	Pool 2	Pool 3	Pool 4	Pool 5
Netherlands (title holders); England; Spain; Italy; Yugoslavia; West Germany; Romania	Soviet Union; Republic of Ireland; Czechoslovakia; Denmark; Belgium; Scotland; Portugal	East Germany; Hungary; Austria; France; Bulgaria; Poland; Greece	Switzerland; Iceland; Wales; Turkey; Norway; Northern Ireland; Finland	Malta; Cyprus; Luxembourg; Albania; San Marino; Faroe Islands

== Summary ==
Six group winners and one runner-up (replacing a banned team) qualified directly for UEFA Euro 1992
Group winner was banned from UEFA Euro 1992
Other teams were eliminated

Group 1	Group 2	Group 3	Group 4	Group 5	Group 6	Group 7
France	Scotland	Soviet Union	Yugoslavia	Germany	Netherlands	England
Czechoslovakia	Switzerland	Italy	Denmark	Wales	Portugal	Republic of Ireland
Spain Iceland Albania	Romania Bulgaria San Marino	Norway Hungary Cyprus	Northern Ireland Austria Faroe Islands	Belgium Luxembourg	Greece Finland Malta	Poland Turkey

== Tiebreakers ==
If two or more teams finished level on points after completion of the group matches, the following tie-breakers were used to determine the final ranking:

1. Greater number of points in all group matches
2. Goal difference in all group matches
3. Greater number of goals scored in all group matches
4. Drawing of lots

== Groups ==
=== Group 1 ===
Pos	Team	Pld	W	D	L	GF	GA	GD	Pts	Qualification	(France)	(Czechoslovakia)	(Spain)	(Iceland)	(Albania)
1	France	8	8	0	0	20	6	+14	16	Qualify for final tournament	—	2–1	3–1	3–1	5–0
2	Czechoslovakia	8	5	0	3	12	9	+3	10		1–2	—	3–2	1–0	2–1
3	Spain	7	3	0	4	17	12	+5	6		1–2	2–1	—	2–1	9–0
4	Iceland	8	2	0	6	7	10	−3	4		1–2	0–1	2–0	—	2–0
5	Albania	7	1	0	6	2	21	−19	2		0–1	0–2	Canc. (Note: The match was cancelled due to the political crisis in Albania; both countries were already eliminated.)	1–0	—

=== Group 2 ===
Pos	Team	Pld	W	D	L	GF	GA	GD	Pts	Qualification	(Scotland)	(Switzerland)	(Romania)	(Bulgaria)	(San Marino)
1	Scotland	8	4	3	1	14	7	+7	11	Qualify for final tournament	—	2–1	2–1	1–1	4–0
2	Switzerland	8	4	2	2	19	7	+12	10		2–2	—	0–0	2–0	7–0
3	Romania	8	4	2	2	13	7	+6	10		1–0	1–0	—	0–3	6–0
4	Bulgaria	8	3	3	2	15	8	+7	9		1–1	2–3	1–1	—	4–0
5	San Marino	8	0	0	8	1	33	−32	0		0–2	0–4	1–3	0–3	—

=== Group 3 ===
Pos	Team	Pld	W	D	L	GF	GA	GD	Pts	Qualification	(Soviet Union)	(Italy)	(Norway)	(Hungary)	(Cyprus)
1	Soviet Union (Note: The Soviet Union team was replaced by CIS in the final tournament due to the dissolution of the Soviet Union just after the end of the qualifying stages.)	8	5	3	0	13	2	+11	13	Qualify for final tournament	—	0–0	2–0	2–2	4–0
2	Italy	8	3	4	1	12	5	+7	10		0–0	—	1–1	3–1	2–0
3	Norway	8	3	3	2	9	5	+4	9		0–1	2–1	—	0–0	3–0
4	Hungary	8	2	4	2	10	9	+1	8		0–1	1–1	0–0	—	4–2
5	Cyprus	8	0	0	8	2	25	−23	0		0–3	0–4	0–3	0–2	—

=== Group 4 ===
Pos	Team	Pld	W	D	L	GF	GA	GD	Pts	Qualification	(Socialist Federal Republic of Yugoslavia)	(Denmark)	(Northern Ireland)	(Austria)	(Faroe Islands)
1	Yugoslavia	8	7	0	1	24	4	+20	14	Banned from final tournament (Note: Yugoslavia were to participate in the final tournament as FR Yugoslavia. However, the Federal Republic of Yugoslavia was placed under sanctions on 30 May 1992 by the United Nations Security Council Resolution 757 after the outbreak of Yugoslav Wars. FIFA and UEFA therefore suspended FR Yugoslavia from competitive football on 31 May 1992, meaning they could not participate in the final tournament. Group runners-up Denmark instead took the spot at the final tournament.)	—	1–2	4–1	4–1	7–0
2	Denmark	8	6	1	1	18	7	+11	13	Qualified for final tournament	0–2	—	2–1	2–1	4–1
3	Northern Ireland	8	2	3	3	11	11	0	7		0–2	1–1	—	2–1	1–1
4	Austria	8	1	1	6	6	14	−8	3		0–2	0–3	0–0	—	3–0
5	Faroe Islands	8	1	1	6	3	26	−23	3		0–2	0–4	0–5	1–0	—

=== Group 5 ===
East Germany were originally drawn into this group alongside West Germany, but after reunification, a single German team participated in the qualification process, taking over the fixtures of West Germany.

Subsequently, East Germany's game on 12 September 1990 against Belgium was reclassified as a friendly, and was also East Germany's final international match, which it won 2–0. An additional game was intended that would see East Germany play West Germany as part of the celebrations of reunification. However, violence at a number of domestic games in East Germany saw the fixture ultimately cancelled. The remainder of East Germany's planned fixtures were cancelled.

Pos	Team	Pld	W	D	L	GF	GA	GD	Pts	Qualification	(Germany)	(Wales)	(Belgium)	(Luxembourg)
1	Germany	6	5	0	1	13	4	+9	10	Qualify for final tournament	—	4–1	1–0	4–0
2	Wales	6	4	1	1	8	6	+2	9		1–0	—	3–1	1–0
3	Belgium	6	2	1	3	7	6	+1	5		0–1	1–1	—	3–0
4	Luxembourg	6	0	0	6	2	14	−12	0		2–3	0–1	0–2	—

=== Group 6 ===
Pos	Team	Pld	W	D	L	GF	GA	GD	Pts	Qualification	(Netherlands)	(Portugal)	(Greece)	(Finland)	(Malta)
1	Netherlands	8	6	1	1	17	2	+15	13	Qualify for final tournament	—	1–0	2–0	2–0	1–0
2	Portugal	8	5	1	2	11	4	+7	11		1–0	—	1–0	1–0	5–0
3	Greece	8	3	2	3	11	9	+2	8		0–2	3–2	—	2–0	4–0
4	Finland	8	1	4	3	5	8	−3	6		1–1	0–0	1–1	—	2–0
5	Malta	8	0	2	6	2	23	−21	2		0–8	0–1	1–1	1–1	—

=== Group 7 ===
Pos	Team	Pld	W	D	L	GF	GA	GD	Pts	Qualification	(England)	(Republic of Ireland)	(Poland)	(Turkey)
1	England	6	3	3	0	7	3	+4	9	Qualify for final tournament	—	1–1	2–0	1–0
2	Republic of Ireland	6	2	4	0	13	6	+7	8		1–1	—	0–0	5–0
3	Poland	6	2	3	1	8	6	+2	7		1–1	3–3	—	3–0
4	Turkey	6	0	0	6	1	14	−13	0		0–1	1–3	0–1	—

== Goalscorers ==
There were 333 goals scored in 123 matches, for an average of 2.71 goals per match.

10 goals

- (Yugoslavia national football team) Darko Pančev

9 goals

- (France national football team) Jean-Pierre Papin

8 goals

- (Netherlands national football team) Marco van Basten

6 goals

- (Denmark national football team) Bent Christensen
- (Switzerland national football team) Adrian Knup

5 goals

- (Hungary national football team) József Kiprich
- (Northern Ireland national football team) Colin Clarke
- (Spain national football team) Emilio Butragueño

4 goals

- (Bulgaria national football team) Nasko Sirakov
- (Denmark national football team) Flemming Povlsen
- (Netherlands national football team) Dennis Bergkamp
- (Scotland national football team) Ally McCoist
- (Spain national football team) Carlos Muñoz

3 goals

- (Bulgaria national football team) Nikolay Todorov
- (Czechoslovakia national football team) Václav Daněk
- (France national football team) Eric Cantona
- (France national football team) Franck Sauzée
- (Germany national football team) Rudi Völler
- (Greece national football team) Stefanos Borbokis
- (Portugal national football team) Rui Águas
- (Portugal national football team) Paulo Futre
- (Republic of Ireland national football team) John Aldridge
- (Republic of Ireland national football team) Tony Cascarino
- (Scotland national football team) Gordon Durie
- (Soviet Union national football team) Andrei Kanchelskis
- (Wales national football team) Ian Rush

2 goals

- (Belgium national football team) Marc Degryse
- (Belgium national football team) Enzo Scifo
- (Bulgaria national football team) Emil Kostadinov
- (Bulgaria national football team) Lyuboslav Penev
- (Czechoslovakia national football team) Pavel Kuka
- (Czechoslovakia national football team) Václav Němeček
- (Denmark national football team) Michael Laudrup
- (England national football team) Gary Lineker
- (Finland national football team) Erik Holmgren
- (Germany national football team) Lothar Matthäus
- (Germany national football team) Karl-Heinz Riedle
- (Greece national football team) Dimitris Saravakos
- (Greece national football team) Panagiotis Tsalouchidis
- (Hungary national football team) Emil Lőrincz
- (Iceland national football team) Atli Eðvaldsson
- (Iceland national football team) Eyjólfur Sverrisson
- (Italy national football team) Roberto Baggio
- (Italy national football team) Roberto Donadoni
- (Italy national football team) Aldo Serena
- (Italy national football team) Gianluca Vialli
- (Norway national football team) Lars Bohinen
- (Norway national football team) Tore André Dahlum
- (Norway national football team) Gøran Sørloth
- (Poland national football team) Ryszard Tarasiewicz
- (Republic of Ireland national football team) John Byrne
- (Republic of Ireland national football team) Niall Quinn
- (Romania national football team) Gheorghe Hagi
- (Romania national football team) Dorin Mateuț
- (Romania national football team) Florin Răducioiu
- (Scotland national football team) John Robertson
- (Soviet Union national football team) Aleksandr Mostovoi
- (Soviet Union national football team) Oleksiy Mykhaylychenko
- (Spain national football team) José Mari Bakero
- (Spain national football team) Abelardo Fernández
- (Switzerland national football team) Stéphane Chapuisat
- (Switzerland national football team) Heinz Hermann
- (Switzerland national football team) Marc Hottiger
- (Switzerland national football team) Alain Sutter
- (Switzerland national football team) Kubilay Türkyilmaz
- (Wales national football team) Paul Bodin
- (Wales national football team) Dean Saunders
- (Yugoslavia national football team) Robert Prosinečki
- (Yugoslavia national football team) Dejan Savićević

1 goal

- (Albania national football team) Eduard Abazi
- (Albania national football team) Hysen Zmijani
- (Austria national football team) Leo Lainer
- (Austria national football team) Andreas Ogris
- (Austria national football team) Ernst Ogris
- (Austria national football team) Heimo Pfeifenberger
- (Austria national football team) Michael Streiter
- (Austria national football team) Arnold Wetl
- (Belgium national football team) Jan Ceulemans
- (Belgium national football team) Erwin Vandenbergh
- (Belgium national football team) Bruno Versavel
- (Bulgaria national football team) Nikolay Iliev
- (Bulgaria national football team) Trifon Ivanov
- (Bulgaria national football team) Hristo Stoichkov
- (Bulgaria national football team) Zlatko Yankov
- (Cyprus national football team) Angelos Tsolakis
- (Cyprus national football team) Panayiotis Xiourouppas
- (Czechoslovakia national football team) Ivan Hašek
- (Czechoslovakia national football team) Luboš Kubík
- (Czechoslovakia national football team) Ľudovít Lancz
- (Czechoslovakia national football team) Ľubomír Moravčík
- (Czechoslovakia national football team) Tomáš Skuhravý
- (Denmark national football team) Jan Bartram
- (Denmark national football team) Kim Christofte
- (Denmark national football team) Lars Elstrup
- (Denmark national football team) Frank Pingel
- (Denmark national football team) Kim Vilfort
- (England national football team) Peter Beardsley
- (England national football team) Lee Dixon
- (England national football team) David Platt
- (England national football team) Alan Smith
- (England national football team) Dennis Wise
- (Faroe Islands national football team) Allan Mørkøre
- (Faroe Islands national football team) Torkil Nielsen
- (Faroe Islands national football team) Kári Reynheim
- (Finland national football team) Petri Järvinen
- (Finland national football team) Jari Litmanen
- (Finland national football team) Kari Ukkonen
- (France national football team) Laurent Blanc
- (France national football team) Basile Boli
- (France national football team) Luis Fernández
- (France national football team) Amara Simba
- (Germany national football team) Uwe Bein
- (Germany national football team) Guido Buchwald
- (Germany national football team) Thomas Doll
- (Germany national football team) Thomas Häßler
- (Germany national football team) Jürgen Klinsmann
- (Germany national football team) Andreas Möller
- (Greece national football team) Vassilis Karapialis
- (Greece national football team) Stelios Manolas
- (Greece national football team) Petros Marinakis
- (Greece national football team) Nikos Tsiantakis
- (Hungary national football team) György Bognár
- (Hungary national football team) László Disztl
- (Hungary national football team) József Szalma
- (Iceland national football team) Arnór Guðjohnsen
- (Iceland national football team) Sigurður Jónsson
- (Iceland national football team) Þorvaldur Örlygsson
- (Italy national football team) Attilio Lombardo
- (Italy national football team) Ruggiero Rizzitelli
- (Italy national football team) Salvatore Schillaci
- (Italy national football team) Pietro Vierchowod
- (Luxembourg national football team) Jean-Paul Girres
- (Luxembourg national football team) Robby Langers
- (Malta national football team) Hubert Suda
- (Malta national football team) Stefan Sultana
- (Netherlands national football team) Danny Blind
- (Netherlands national football team) Frank de Boer
- (Netherlands national football team) Ruud Gullit
- (Netherlands national football team) Aron Winter
- (Netherlands national football team) Richard Witschge
- (Northern Ireland national football team) Kingsley Black
- (Northern Ireland national football team) Iain Dowie
- (Northern Ireland national football team) Colin Hill
- (Northern Ireland national football team) Alan McDonald
- (Northern Ireland national football team) Gerry Taggart
- (Northern Ireland national football team) Kevin Wilson
- (Norway national football team) Sverre Brandhaug
- (Norway national football team) Mini Jakobsen
- (Norway national football team) Pål Lydersen
- (Poland national football team) Piotr Czachowski
- (Poland national football team) Dariusz Dziekanowski
- (Poland national football team) Jan Furtok
- (Poland national football team) Roman Kosecki
- (Poland national football team) Roman Szewczyk
- (Poland national football team) Jan Urban
- (Portugal national football team) César Brito
- (Portugal national football team) Jorge Cadete
- (Portugal national football team) José Leal
- (Portugal national football team) Vítor Paneira
- (Portugal national football team) João Vieira Pinto
- (Republic of Ireland national football team) Paul McGrath
- (Republic of Ireland national football team) David O'Leary
- (Republic of Ireland national football team) Andy Townsend
- (Romania national football team) Pavel Badea
- (Romania national football team) Rodion Cămătaru
- (Romania national football team) Ioan Lupescu
- (Romania national football team) Dan Petrescu
- (Romania national football team) Adrian Popescu
- (Romania national football team) Ioan Sabău
- (San Marino national football team) Valdes Pasolini
- (Scotland national football team) John Collins
- (Scotland national football team) Richard Gough
- (Scotland national football team) Gary McAllister
- (Scotland national football team) Paul McStay
- (Scotland national football team) Gordon Strachan
- (Soviet Union national football team) Sergei Aleinikov
- (Soviet Union national football team) Igor Korneev
- (Soviet Union national football team) Oleh Kuznetsov
- (Soviet Union national football team) Oleh Protasov
- (Soviet Union national football team) Igor Shalimov
- (Soviet Union national football team) Sergei Yuran
- (Spain national football team) Guillermo Amor
- (Spain national football team) Fernando Hierro
- (Spain national football team) Míchel
- (Spain national football team) Roberto Fernández
- (Switzerland national football team) Thomas Bickel
- (Switzerland national football team) Frédéric Chassot
- (Switzerland national football team) Christophe Ohrel
- (Turkey national football team) Rıza Çalımbay
- (Wales national football team) Mark Hughes
- (Yugoslavia national football team) Mehmed Baždarević
- (Yugoslavia national football team) Dragiša Binić
- (Yugoslavia national football team) Zvonimir Boban
- (Yugoslavia national football team) Robert Jarni
- (Yugoslavia national football team) Vladimir Jugović
- (Yugoslavia national football team) Srečko Katanec
- (Yugoslavia national football team) Vladan Lukić
- (Yugoslavia national football team) Ilija Najdoski
- (Yugoslavia national football team) Davor Šuker
- (Yugoslavia national football team) Zoran Vulić

1 own goal

- (Albania national football team) Hysen Zmijani (against France)
- (Austria national football team) Peter Artner (against Denmark)
- (San Marino national football team) Ivan Matteoni (against Romania)
