= UEFA Euro 1992 qualifying Group 1 =

Football tournament qualifying stage

Standings and results for Group 1 of the UEFA Euro 1992 qualifying tournament.

Group 1 consisted of Albania, Czechoslovakia, France, Iceland and Spain.

== Final table ==
Pos	Team	Pld	W	D	L	GF	GA	GD	Pts	Qualification	(France)	(Czechoslovakia)	(Spain)	(Iceland)	(Albania)
1	France	8	8	0	0	20	6	+14	16	Qualify for final tournament	—	2–1	3–1	3–1	5–0
2	Czechoslovakia	8	5	0	3	12	9	+3	10		1–2	—	3–2	1–0	2–1
3	Spain	7	3	0	4	17	12	+5	6		1–2	2–1	—	2–1	9–0
4	Iceland	8	2	0	6	7	10	−3	4		1–2	0–1	2–0	—	2–0
5	Albania	7	1	0	6	2	21	−19	2		0–1	0–2	Canc. (Note: The match was cancelled due to the political crisis in Albania; both countries were already eliminated.)	1–0	—

Source: UEFA
Rules for classification: Qualification tiebreakers

== Results ==
30 May 1990
20:00 UTC+0

Iceland	2–0	Albania
Gudjohnsen 41'; Edvaldsson 82'	Report

Laugardalsvöllur, Reykjavík
Attendance: 5,250
Referee: Frederick McKnight (Northern Ireland)

5 September 1990
18:30 UTC+0

Iceland	1–2	France
Edvaldsson 85'	Report	Papin 12'; Cantona 74'

Laugardalsvöllur, Reykjavík
Attendance: 8,388
Referee: David Syme (Scotland)

26 September 1990
17:00 UTC+2

Czechoslovakia	1–0	Iceland
Daněk 43'	Report

Všešportový Areál Stadium, Košice
Attendance: 35,247
Referee: Todor Kolev (Bulgaria)

10 October 1990
20:30 UTC+1

Spain	2–1	Iceland
Butragueño 44'; Muñoz 63'	Report	Jónsson 66'

Benito Villamarín, Seville
Attendance: 18,399
Referee: Victor Mintoff (Malta)

13 October 1990
20:45 UTC+1

France	2–1	Czechoslovakia
Papin 60', 83'	Report	Skuhravý 89'

Parc des Princes, Paris
Attendance: 38,249
Referee: George Courtney (England)

14 November 1990
18:00 UTC+1

Czechoslovakia	3–2	Spain
Daněk 16', 67'; Moravčík 77'	Report	Roberto 30'; Muñoz 54'

Evžena Rošického Stadium, Prague
Attendance: 17,773
Referee: Karl-Heinz Tritschler (Germany)

17 November 1990
14:00 UTC+1

Albania	0–1	France
	Report	Boli 25'

Qemal Stafa Stadium, Tirana
Attendance: 12,972
Referee: Bruno Galler (Switzerland)

19 December 1990
20:30 UTC+1

Spain	9–0	Albania
Amor 21'; Muñoz 24', 65'; Butragueño 31', 57', 68', 88'; Hierro 40'; Bakero 76'	Report

Ramón Sánchez-Pizjuán, Seville
Attendance: 12,625
Referee: Alphonse Costantin (Belgium)

20 February 1991
20:45 UTC+1

France	3–1	Spain
Sauzée 14'; Papin 58'; Blanc 76'	Report	Bakero 10'

Parc des Princes, Paris
Attendance: 41,474
Referee: Tullio Lanese (Italy)

30 March 1991
20:45 UTC+1

France	5–0	Albania
Sauzée 1', 9'; Papin 33' (pen.), 42'; Zmijani 81' (o.g.)	Report

Parc des Princes, Paris
Attendance: 24,181
Referee: Einar Halle (Norway)

1 May 1991
16:30 UTC+2

Albania	0–2	Czechoslovakia
	Report	Kubík 25'; Kuka 66'

Qemal Stafa Stadium, Tirana
Attendance: 4,205
Referee: Carlo Longhi (Italy)

26 May 1991
17:00 UTC+2

Albania	1–0	Iceland
Abazi 65'	Report

Qemal Stafa Stadium, Tirana
Attendance: 2,349
Referee: Sándor Varga (Hungary)

5 June 1991
20:00 UTC+0

Iceland	0–1	Czechoslovakia
	Report	Hašek 15'

Laugardalsvöllur, Reykjavík
Attendance: 5,050
Referee: John Spillane (Republic of Ireland)

4 September 1991
18:30 UTC+2

Czechoslovakia	1–2	France
Němeček 19'	Report	Papin 53', 89'

Tehelné Pole Stadium, Bratislava
Attendance: 44,884
Referee: Peter Mikkelsen (Denmark)

25 September 1991
17:15 UTC+0

Iceland	2–0	Spain
Örlygsson 71'; Sverrisson 79'	Report

Laugardalsvöllur, Reykjavík
Attendance: 3,848
Referee: Cornelius Bakker (Netherlands)

12 October 1991
20:30 UTC+1

Spain	1–2	France
Abelardo 33'	Report	Fernández 12'; Papin 15'

Benito Villamarín, Seville
Attendance: 9,399
Referee: Hubert Forstinger (Austria)

16 October 1991
15:00 UTC+1

Czechoslovakia	2–1	Albania
Kuka 35'; Lancz 39'	Report	Zmijani 60'

Andruv Stadium, Olomouc
Attendance: 2,366
Referee: Michal Listkiewicz (Poland)

13 November 1991
20:30 UTC+1

Spain	2–1	Czechoslovakia
Abelardo 10'; Michel 78' (pen.)	Report	Němeček 60'

Ramón Sánchez-Pizjuán, Seville
Attendance: 8,691
Referee: Kurt Röthlisberger (Switzerland)

20 November 1991
20:45 UTC+1

France	3–1	Iceland
Simba 41'; Cantona 59', 67'	Report	Sverrisson 70'

Parc des Princes, Paris
Attendance: 27,393
Referee: Erik Fredriksson (Sweden)

18 December 1991
14:00 UTC+1

Albania	Cancelled (Note: The match was cancelled due to the prevailing political situation in Albania, and both countries were already eliminated.)	Spain
	Report

Qemal Stafa Stadium, Tirana
Referee: Roger Philippi (Luxembourg)

== Goalscorers ==
There were 58 goals scored in 19 matches, for an average of 3.05 goals per match.

9 goals

- (France national football team) Jean-Pierre Papin

5 goals

- (Spain national football team) Emilio Butragueño

4 goals

- (Spain national football team) Carlos Muñoz

3 goals

- (Czechoslovakia national football team) Václav Daněk
- (France national football team) Eric Cantona
- (France national football team) Franck Sauzée

2 goals

- (Czechoslovakia national football team) Pavel Kuka
- (Czechoslovakia national football team) Václav Němeček
- (Iceland national football team) Atli Eðvaldsson
- (Iceland national football team) Eyjólfur Sverrisson
- (Spain national football team) José Mari Bakero
- (Spain national football team) Abelardo Fernández

1 goal

- (Albania national football team) Eduard Abazi
- (Albania national football team) Hysen Zmijani
- (Czechoslovakia national football team) Ivan Hašek
- (Czechoslovakia national football team) Luboš Kubík
- (Czechoslovakia national football team) Ľudovít Lancz
- (Czechoslovakia national football team) Ľubomír Moravčík
- (Czechoslovakia national football team) Tomáš Skuhravý
- (France national football team) Laurent Blanc
- (France national football team) Basile Boli
- (France national football team) Luis Fernández
- (France national football team) Amara Simba
- (Iceland national football team) Arnór Guðjohnsen
- (Iceland national football team) Sigurður Jónsson
- (Iceland national football team) Þorvaldur Örlygsson
- (Spain national football team) Guillermo Amor
- (Spain national football team) Fernando Hierro
- (Spain national football team) Míchel
- (Spain national football team) Roberto Fernández

1 own goal

- (Albania national football team) Hysen Zmijani (against France)
