= José Leal =

Portuguese football manager and former player

Personal information
- Full name: José Martins Leal
- Date of birth: 23 March 1965 (age 61)
- Place of birth: Sá da Bandeira, Angola
- Height: 1.85 m (6 ft 1 in)
- Position: Left back

Youth career
- 1978–1983: Repesenses

Senior career*
Years	Team	Apps	(Gls)
1983–1984	Viseu e Benfica		
1984–1989	Académico Viseu		
1989–1994	Sporting CP	118	(12)
1994–1995	Belenenses	17	(0)
1995–1996	Felgueiras	32	(1)
1996–2000	Estrela Amadora	108	(13)
2000–2002	Santa Clara	25	(1)
2002–2003	Académico Viseu	33	(2)

International career
1989	Portugal U21	1	(0)
1990–1992	Portugal	15	(1)

Managerial career
- 2003: Académico Viseu
- 2005–2006: Benfica Castelo Branco
- 2006–2007: Tondela
- * Club domestic league appearances and goals

José Martins Leal (born 23 March 1965) is a Portuguese retired footballer who played as a left back.

== Club career ==
Leal was born in Sá da Bandeira, Portuguese Angola. During his professional career he represented Académico de Viseu FC (his first and last club, where he retired at age 38 in the third division), Sporting Clube de Portugal, C.F. Os Belenenses, F.C. Felgueiras, C.F. Estrela da Amadora and C.D. Santa Clara.

With the Lisbon club, Leal was first-choice during most of his five-year spell, also scoring regularly for a defensive player, but, in his last season, was demoted to third-string after youth graduate Paulo Torres and newly signed Budimir Vujačić, and left the Lions without any silverware conquered.

== International career ==
Leal earned 15 caps for Portugal – one goal – almost all of them coming during the UEFA Euro 1992 qualifying campaign, as the national team did not make it to the final stages in Sweden.

José Leal: International goals
No.	Date	Venue	Opponent	Score	Result	Competition
1	20 February 1991	Estádio das Antas, Porto, Portugal	Malta	2–0	5–0	Euro 1992 qualifying
