= Guy Goethals =

Belgian football referee

- Born: 26 December 1952 (age 73); Brussels, Belgium
- Other occupation: Lawyer

Domestic
Years	League	Role
1989–1997	Belgian First Division	Referee

International
Years	League	Role
1990–1997	FIFA-listed	Referee

Guy Goethals (born 26 December 1952) is a Belgian retired football referee.

== Career ==
Goethals was born in Brussels. He refereed two matches in the UEFA European Football Championship in 1992 and 1996. He is the son of Raymond Goethals.

He officiated during Euro 1992 qualifying, 1994 World Cup qualifying, Euro 1996 qualifying, and the 1991 FIFA World Youth Championship. Goethals is known to have served as a FIFA referee during the period from 1990 to 1996.
