= Roman Szewczyk =

Polish footballer

Personal information
- Full name: Roman Edward Szewczyk
- Date of birth: 18 March 1965 (age 61)
- Place of birth: Bytom, Poland
- Height: 1.83 m (6 ft 0 in)
- Position: Defender

Senior career*
Years	Team	Apps	(Gls)
1982–1988	Szombierki Bytom		
1989–1990	Śląsk Wrocław	26	(2)
1990–1993	GKS Katowice	92	(15)
1993–1996	FC Sochaux-Montbéliard	85	(4)
1996–2004	SV Salzburg	216	(6)
2004	USV Thalgau		
2008	FC Bergheim	6	(0)
2010	FC Bergheim	8	(1)

International career
1989–1994	Poland	37	(3)

Managerial career
- 2005–: Red Bull Salzburg (scout)
- 2013–2015: FC Bergheim Jugend
- 2015–2016: USV Elixhausen (assistant)
- * Club domestic league appearances and goals

Roman Szewczyk (born 18 March 1965) is a Polish former professional footballer who played as a defender.

He played 37 times for Poland, scoring 3 goals. He scored the opener in England v Poland in Euro 1992 qualifying Group 7.

== Honours ==
GKS Katowice

- Polish Cup: 1990–91, 1992–93

SV Salzburg

- Austrian Bundesliga: 1996–97

== Sources ==
- Barreaud, Marc (1998). Dictionnaire des footballeurs étrangers du championnat professionnel français (1932-1997). L'Harmattan, Paris. ISBN 2-7384-6608-7.
- Roman Szewczyk at WorldFootball.net
