= Sverkerson =

Sverkerson may refer to:

- Boleslas Sverkerson, son of Sverker the Elder, King of Sweden and his second wife Richeza of Poland
- Jon Sverkerson (c. 1201–1222), Swedish king elected in 1216
- Karl Sverkerson (c. 1130–1167), ruler of Gothenland, then King of Sweden from c. 1161 to 1167
- Kol Sverkerson, claimant to the throne of Sweden from 1167 to his death a few years later
