= Sverrisson =

Sverrisson is an Icelandic surname. Notable people with the name include:

- Eyjólfur Sverrisson (born 1968), Icelandic footballer and football coach
- Skúli Sverrisson (born 1966), Icelandic composer and bass guitarist
