= Severs =

Severs may refer to:

- Severs or Severians, an East Slavic tribe
- Sever's disease, an inflammation of the back heel
- Severs Hotel (Muskogee, Oklahoma), a hotel in Muskogee, Oklahoma

== People with last name "Severs" ==
- Chad Severs (born 1982), American soccer player
- Dennis Severs, previous resident of Dennis Severs' House
- Michael Severs, American guitarist
