= Eyjólfur Sverrisson =

Icelandic footballer and coach

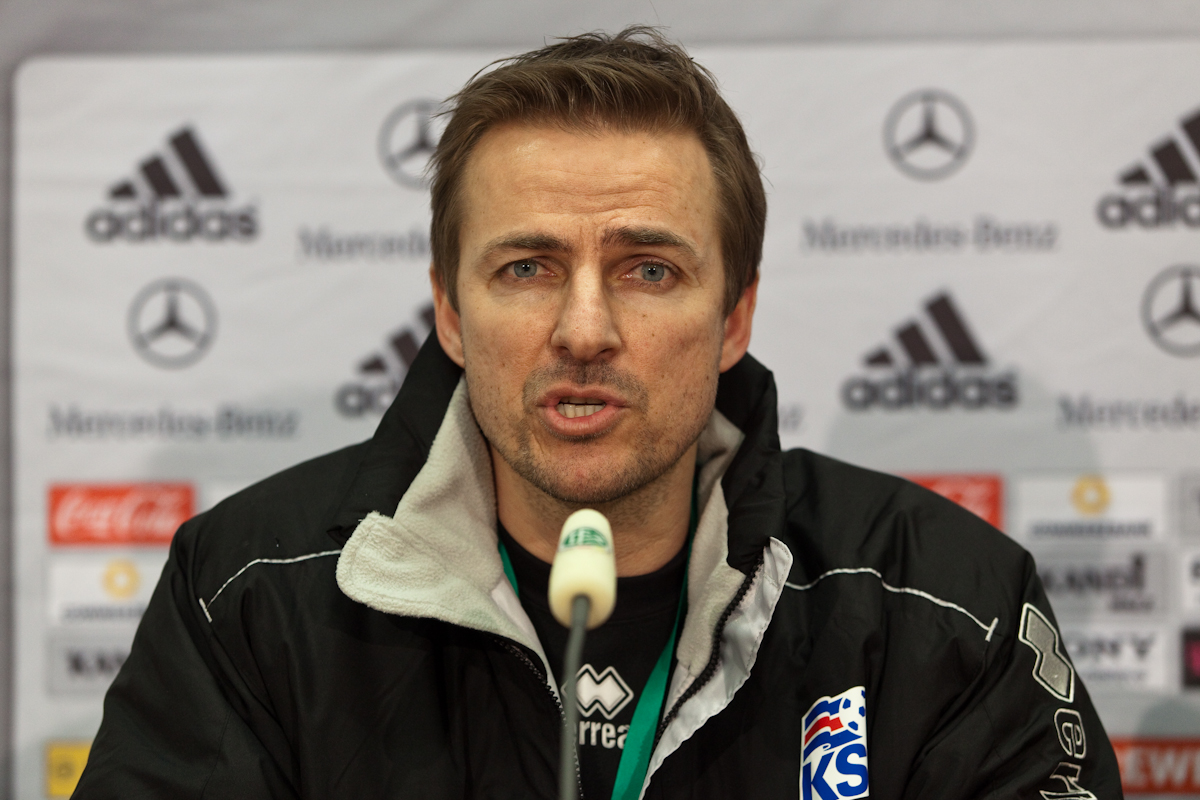

Personal information
- Full name: Eyjólfur Gjafar Sverrisson
- Date of birth: 3 August 1968 (age 58)
- Place of birth: Sauðárkrókur, Iceland
- Height: 1.86 m (6 ft 1 in)
- Positions: Defender; midfielder; forward

Senior career*
Years	Team	Apps	(Gls)
1985–1989	UMF Tindastóll	79	(66)
1989–1994	VfB Stuttgart	110	(21)
1994–1995	Beşiktaş	33	(9)
1995–2003	Hertha BSC	197	(13)
Total		419	(109)

International career
1988–1989	Iceland U21	5	(5)
1990–2001	Iceland	66	(10)

Managerial career
- 2004–2005: Iceland U21
- 2005–2007: Iceland
- 2009–2018: Iceland U21
- 2011: VfL Wolfsburg (assistant)
- * Club domestic league appearances and goals

Eyjólfur Gjafar Sverrisson (born 3 August 1968) is an Icelandic former footballer and former coach of the Iceland national team.

He is the father of Hólmar Örn Eyjólfsson, also a professional footballer.

== Football ==
=== Playing career ===
==== Club career ====
Eyjólfur started his career as a striker at local team UMF Tindastóll and moved to VfB Stuttgart in 1989. He played for Stuttgart until 1994 and became a German champion in 1992. After five seasons, he moved to play in midfield for Beşiktaş J.K. in Turkey and became Turkish champion with the team in 1995. He left them at the end of that season and changed to Hertha BSC, where he helped securing promotion to the Bundesliga in 1997 and won the DFB-Ligapokal in 2001. In his last couple of seasons he played as a defender.

During his Bundesliga career, Eyjólfur played 251 matches and scored 30 goals.

==== International career ====
He was capped 66 times for Iceland, making his debut in a Euro 1992 qualifying match in May 1991 against Albania. During the 1990s he was one of the stars of the national team and also skippered them. His last international came in October 2001, in a World cup qualifier against Denmark which Iceland lost 0–6 away.

=== Coaching career ===
In October 2005 he was appointed the coach of the Iceland national football team, where he has struggled, only winning two of his first 14 competitive games. Eyjólfur was sacked on 27 October 2007.

While managing the Iceland U21 men's football team, he signed a short-term contract as assistant with VfL Wolfsburg on 10 February 2011. He left the position as manager for Iceland U21 in the beginning of January 2019.

== Football career statistics ==
=== International ===
Appearances and goals by national team and year
National team	Year	Apps	Goals
Iceland	1990	1	0
Iceland	1991	6	2
Iceland	1992	3	0
Iceland	1993	3	2
Iceland	1994	6	0
Iceland	1995	7	0
Iceland	1996	9	0
Iceland	1997	7	0
Iceland	1998	3	0
Iceland	1999	7	2
Iceland	2000	6	2
Iceland	2001	8	2
Total		66	10

Scores and results list Iceland's goal tally first, score column indicates score after each Sverrisson goal.

List of international goals scored by Eyjólfur Sverrisson
No.	Date	Venue	Opponent	Score	Result	Competition
1	25 September 1991	Laugardalsvöllur, Reykjavík, Iceland	Spain	2–0	2–0	UEFA Euro 1992 qualification
2	20 November 1991	Parc des Princes, Paris, France	France	1–3	1–3	UEFA Euro 1992 qualification
3	2 June 1993	Laugardalsvöllur, Reykjavík, Iceland	Russia	1–0	1–1	1994 FIFA World Cup qualification
4	16 June 1993	Laugardalsvöllur, Reykjavík, Iceland	Hungary	1–0	2–0	1994 FIFA World Cup qualification
5	27 March 1999	Estadi Comunal d'Andorra la Vella, Andorra la Vella, Andorra	Andorra	1–0	2–0	UEFA Euro 2000 qualification
6	9 October 1999	Stade de France, Saint-Denis, France	France	1–2	2–3	UEFA Euro 2000 qualification
7	27 July 2000	Laugardalsvöllur, Reykjavík, Iceland	Malta	1–0	5–0	Friendly
8	2 September 2000	Laugardalsvöllur, Reykjavík, Iceland	Denmark	1–0	1–2	2002 FIFA World Cup qualification
9	1 September 2001	Laugardalsvöllur, Reykjavík, Iceland	Czech Republic	1–0	3–1	2002 FIFA World Cup qualification
10	1 September 2001	Laugardalsvöllur, Reykjavík, Iceland	Czech Republic	3–0	3–1	2002 FIFA World Cup qualification

=== Managerial ===
Team	From	To	Record				
Team	From	To	G	W	D	L	Win %
Iceland national football team	2005	2007	14	2	4	8	14.29
Total			14	2	4	8	14.29

== Basketball ==
Eyjólfur Sverrisson
Personal information
- Listed height: 186 cm (6 ft 1 in)

Career information
- Playing career: 1983–1989
- Position: Shooting guard
- Number: 7

Career history
- 1983–1989: Tindastóll

Career highlights
- 2x Division I scoring champion (1987, 1988); Icelandic All-Star (1989); Division I champion (1988); Division II champion (1986)

=== Club career ===
Eyjólfur started his basketball career with Tindastóll and was a key member of the team that won the Icelandic Division II in 1986. He had a stellar first season in the Icelandic Division I with Tindastóll and averaged a league leading 26.4 points in 20 games. The next season Eyjólfur upped his average to 32.8 points per game, including a season high 50 points against Skallagrímur, again leading the league in scoring, His performance helped the club win the Icelandic Division I and achieve promotion to the top-tier Icelandic Úrvalsdeild. Eyjólfur was the second leading scorer of the Úrvalsdeild karla for the 1988–1989 season, averaging 24.2 points per game and was selected to the Icelandic All-Star game in February 1989. It was his final full season in basketball as the next season he moved to VfB Stuttgart to fully focus on his football career.

=== International career ===
Eyjólfur played 10 games for the Icelandic junior national teams. In August 1989, he was selected to a 20-player training camp with the Icelandic national team but was unable to attend due to scheduling conflicts with Tindastóll's football games.
