= UEFA Euro 1992 qualifying Group 3 =

Football tournament qualifying stage

Qualifying Group 3 for the 1992 UEFA European Football Championship took place between 12 September 1990 and 21 December 1991 and consisted of Italy, the Soviet Union, Hungary, Norway and Cyprus.

The Soviet Union qualified for UEFA Euro 1992 after defeating Cyprus 3–0 in their final fixture on 13 November 1991. However, following the dissolution of the Soviet Union on 26 December 1991, the nation would not compete at the tournament. Instead, the Commonwealth of Independent States would represent the nations which had previously formed the Soviet Union at the championships.

== Background ==
Following the Revolutions of 1989, the breakup and eventual dissolution of the Soviet Union had begun before the qualifying campaign started in September 1990. Some republics declared their independence during the qualifying campaign and the Soviet Union eventually ceased to exist on 26 December 1991.

Previously, Italy had qualified for the UEFA European Championships on three occasions and had won the competition once as hosts in 1968. The Soviet Union had qualified five times previously. They had finished as runners-up three times and were winners of the inaugural competition in 1960. Hungary had qualified twice before but neither Norway nor Cyprus had reached the finals.

== Format ==
The group was contested as a double round robin in which each team would play every other team twice – once at home and once away. The group winner would qualify for UEFA Euro 1992.

== Summary ==
The group began with a 2–0 win for the Soviet Union against Norway in Moscow on 12 September 1990. The following month, Hungary recorded draws with Norway and Italy before defeating Cyprus 4–2. In November 1990, the Soviet Union and Italy played out a goalless draw in Rome before Norway defeated Cyprus 3–0. In the final match of 1990, Italy defeated Cyprus 4–0. That left Italy and Norway top of the standings with four points, one head of the Soviet Union and Norway at the turn of the year.

In April 1991, Hungary defeated Cyprus 2–0 before losing 1–0 to the Soviet Union. Norway and Italy then recorded wins against Cyprus and Hungary respectively on 1 May. After the Soviet Union's win against Cyprus on 29 May, the Soviet Union were top of the standings with four games left to play. Italy and Hungary were one point behind and Norway two points behind.

The standings tightened further when Norway defeated 10-man Italy on 5 June. The following month, the Soviet Union defeated Norway to establish a two-point lead. Hungary were eliminated after drawing 2–2 with the Soviet Union on 25 September. That meant the Soviet Union could qualify with a win in their next match against Italy but they couldn't find the net in the goalless draw. Norway were eliminated from contention after a goalless draw in their penultimate match against Hungary.

On 13 November, the Soviet Union won the group and qualified for UEFA Euro 1992 after defeating Cyprus 3–0. On the same day, Italy drew with Norway before they defeated Cyprus in the final match of the group.

== Standings ==
Pos	Team	Pld	W	D	L	GF	GA	GD	Pts	Qualification	(Soviet Union)	(Italy)	(Norway)	(Hungary)	(Cyprus)
1	Soviet Union (Note: The Soviet Union team was replaced by CIS in the final tournament due to the dissolution of the Soviet Union just after the end of the qualifying stages.)	8	5	3	0	13	2	+11	13	Qualify for final tournament	—	0–0	2–0	2–2	4–0
2	Italy	8	3	4	1	12	5	+7	10		0–0	—	1–1	3–1	2–0
3	Norway	8	3	3	2	9	5	+4	9		0–1	2–1	—	0–0	3–0
4	Hungary	8	2	4	2	10	9	+1	8		0–1	1–1	0–0	—	4–2
5	Cyprus	8	0	0	8	2	25	−23	0		0–3	0–4	0–3	0–2	—

Rules for classification: Qualification tiebreakers

== Results ==
12 September 1990
19:00 UTC+4

Soviet Union	2–0	Norway
Kanchelskis 22'; Kuznetsov 60'

Central Lenin Stadium, Moscow
Attendance: 23,000
Referee: Hubert Forstinger (Austria)

10 October 1990
19:00 UTC+2

Norway	0–0	Hungary

Brann Stadion, Bergen
Attendance: 6,304
Referee: John Spillane (Republic of Ireland)

17 October 1990
19:00 UTC+2

Hungary	1–1	Italy
Disztl 16'		Baggio 54' (pen.)

Népstadion, Budapest
Attendance: 24,431
Referee: Bo Karlsson (Sweden)

31 October 1990
18:00 UTC+1

Hungary	4–2	Cyprus
Lőrincz 1', 19'; Kiprich 20' (pen.), 67' (pen.)		Xiourouppas 13'; Tsolakis 89'

Népstadion, Budapest
Attendance: 2,204
Referee: Plarent Kotherja (Albania)

3 November 1990
14:30 UTC+1

Italy	0–0	Soviet Union

Stadio Olimpico, Rome
Attendance: 52,208
Referee: Marcel Van Langenhove (Belgium)

14 November 1990
19:00 UTC+2

Cyprus	0–3	Norway
		Sørloth 39'; Bohinen 50'; Brandhaug 64'

Makario Stadium, Nicosia
Attendance: 2,133
Referee: Zoran Petrović (Yugoslavia)

22 December 1990
15:00 UTC+2

Cyprus	0–4	Italy
		Vierchowod 15'; Serena 22', 50'; Lombardo 44'

Tsirion Stadium, Limassol
Attendance: 9,185
Referee: Ivan Gregr (Czechoslovakia)

3 April 1991
15:00 UTC+3

Cyprus	0–2	Hungary
		Szalma 15'; Kiprich 40'

Tsirion Stadium, Limassol
Attendance: 1,844
Referee: Gerhard Kapl (Austria)

17 April 1991
19:00 UTC+2

Hungary	0–1	Soviet Union
		Mikhailichenko 30'

Népstadion, Budapest
Attendance: 43,221
Referee: Aron Schmidhuber (Germany)

1 May 1991
19:00 UTC+2

Norway	3–0	Cyprus
Lydersen 49' (pen.); Dahlum 65'; Sørloth 90'

Ullevaal Stadion, Oslo
Attendance: 5,825
Referee: Kaj Natri (Finland)
1 May 1991
20:15 UTC+2

Italy	3–1	Hungary
Donadoni 4', 16'; Vialli 56'		Bognár 65' (pen.)

Stadio Arechi, Salerno
Attendance: 37,602
Referee: Joe Worrall (England)

29 May 1991
19:00 UTC+3

Soviet Union	4–0	Cyprus
Mostovoi 10'; Mikhailichenko 51'; Korneev 87'; Aleinikov 89'

Central Lenin Stadium, Moscow
Attendance: 14,200
Referee: Ștefan Dan Petrescu (Romania)

5 June 1991
19:00 UTC+2

Norway	2–1	Italy
Dahlum 4'; Bohinen 25'		Schillaci 77'

Ullevaal Stadion, Oslo
Attendance: 24,346
Referee: Mario van der Ende (Netherlands)

28 August 1991
19:00 UTC+2

Norway	0–1	Soviet Union
		Mostovoi 74'

Ullevaal Stadion, Oslo
Attendance: 24,383
Referee: Howard King (Wales)

25 September 1991
19:00 UTC+3

Soviet Union	2–2	Hungary
Shalimov 37' (pen.); Kanchelskis 50'		Kiprich 16', 84'

Central Lenin Stadium, Moscow
Attendance: 34,973
Referee: Zoran Petrović (Yugoslavia)

12 October 1991
19:00 UTC+3

Soviet Union	0–0	Italy

Central Lenin Stadium, Moscow
Attendance: 86,486
Referee: Bruno Galler (Switzerland)

30 October 1991
20:00 UTC+1

Hungary	0–0	Norway

Rohonci Street Stadium, Szombathely
Attendance: 4,609
Referee: Gérard Biguet (France)

13 November 1991
19:15 UTC+1

Italy	1–1	Norway
Rizzitelli 83'		Jakobsen 60'

Stadio Luigi Ferraris, Genoa
Attendance: 21,372
Referee: Karl-Josef Assenmacher (Germany)
13 November 1991
20:15 UTC+2

Cyprus	0–3	Soviet Union
		Protasov 26'; Yuran 78'; Kanchelskis 81'

Tsirion Stadium, Limassol
Attendance: 3,379
Referee: Andrew Waddell (Scotland)

21 December 1991
14:30 UTC+1

Italy	2–0	Cyprus
Vialli 28'; Baggio 55'

Stadio Pino Zaccheria, Foggia
Attendance: 17,732
Referee: Joaquin Ramos Marcos (Spain)

== Goalscorers ==
There were 46 goals scored in 20 matches, for an average of 2.3 goals per match.

5 goals

- (Hungary national football team) József Kiprich

3 goals

- (Soviet Union national football team) Andrei Kanchelskis

2 goals

- (Hungary national football team) Emil Lőrincz
- (Italy national football team) Roberto Baggio
- (Italy national football team) Roberto Donadoni
- (Italy national football team) Aldo Serena
- (Italy national football team) Gianluca Vialli
- (Norway national football team) Lars Bohinen
- (Norway national football team) Tore André Dahlum
- (Norway national football team) Gøran Sørloth
- (Soviet Union national football team) Aleksandr Mostovoi
- (Soviet Union national football team) Oleksiy Mykhaylychenko

1 goal

- (Cyprus national football team) Angelos Tsolakis
- (Cyprus national football team) Panayiotis Xiourouppas
- (Hungary national football team) György Bognár
- (Hungary national football team) László Disztl
- (Hungary national football team) József Szalma
- (Italy national football team) Attilio Lombardo
- (Italy national football team) Ruggiero Rizzitelli
- (Italy national football team) Salvatore Schillaci
- (Italy national football team) Pietro Vierchowod
- (Norway national football team) Sverre Brandhaug
- (Norway national football team) Mini Jakobsen
- (Norway national football team) Pål Lydersen
- (Soviet Union national football team) Sergei Aleinikov
- (Soviet Union national football team) Igor Korneev
- (Soviet Union national football team) Oleh Kuznetsov
- (Soviet Union national football team) Oleh Protasov
- (Soviet Union national football team) Igor Shalimov
- (Soviet Union national football team) Sergei Yuran

== Aftermath ==
Following the dissolution of the Soviet Union, the Commonwealth of Independent States (CIS) – a regional intergovernmental organisation representing a number of former Soviet republics – was formed. The CIS would replace the Soviet Union in the final tournament.
