= Ľudovít Lancz =

Czechoslovak footballer (1964–2004)

Personal information
- Date of birth: 2 June 1964
- Date of death: 20 July 2004 (aged 40)
- Place of death: Bratislava, Slovakia
- Positions: Midfielder; forward

Senior career*
Years	Team	Apps	(Gls)
1983–1985	ZŤS Petržalka		
1985–1986	Dukla Prague	1	(0)
1986–1987	Banská Bystrica	20	(1)
1987–1990	Inter Bratislava	79	(10)
1990	Hydronika Petržalka		
1991	Inter Bratislava	2	(0)
1991–1992	Slovan Bratislava	26	(4)
1992–1993	Angers	26	(3)
1993–1995	Slovan Bratislava		

International career
1991–1992	Czechoslovakia	2	(1)
1992	Czechoslovakia B	1	(0)
- * Club domestic league appearances and goals

Ľudovít Lancz (2 June 1964 – 20 July 2004) was a professional footballer who played as a midfielder or forward. In eight seasons in the Czechoslovak First League, Lancz made 153 appearances and scored a total of 24 goals. He played for Slovan Bratislava in the 1991–92 Czechoslovak First League, with the club winning the league title that season. He made two appearances for the Czechoslovakia national team scoring once.

Having left a suicide note, he died at the age of 40, after falling from his 11th-floor apartment in Bratislava on 20 July 2004.
