= Piotr Czachowski =

Polish footballer

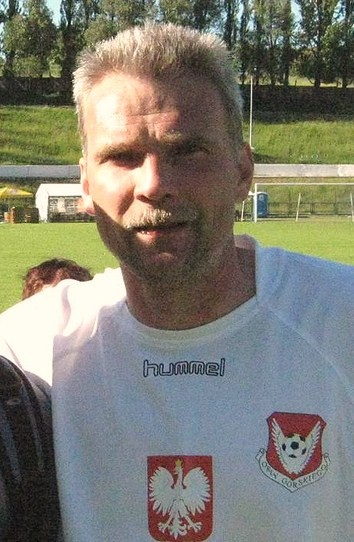

Personal information
- Date of birth: 7 November 1966 (age 59)
- Place of birth: Warsaw, Poland
- Height: 1.80 m (5 ft 11 in)
- Positions: Defender; midfielder

Youth career
- 1983–1985: Okęcie Warsaw

Senior career*
Years	Team	Apps	(Gls)
1985–1990	Stal Mielec	115	(2)
1990–1991	Legia Warsaw	12	(0)
1991–1992	Zagłębie Lubin	29	(2)
1992–1993	Udinese	11	(0)
1993	Legia Warsaw	2	(0)
1993–1994	Dundee	19	(1)
1995–1997	ŁKS Łódź	54	(2)
1997–1998	Aluminium Konin	48	(4)
1998–2002	Okęcie Warsaw		
2002–2006	KS Piaseczno		
2012	UKS Łady		

International career
1989-1993	Poland	45	(1)
- * Club domestic league appearances and goals

Piotr Czachowski (born 7 November 1966) is a Polish football pundit, co-commentator and former player. In 1991, he won the Polish Footballer of the Year Award conferred by the Piłka Nożna football weekly.

== Playing career ==
He played for several clubs in his native Poland, as well as Udinese in Italy and Dundee in Scotland. He was the third Polish player to sign with a Serie A club, after Zbigniew Boniek and Władysław Żmuda. With Legia Warsaw, he played in the semifinals of 1991 Cup Winners' Cup, losing to Manchester United. He was capped by Poland 45 times in the late 1980s and early 1990s. He held a record for most consecutive games from the debut in the national team. During his stint in Dundee, he sustained an injury which eliminated him from the entire 1994–95 season; after the injury he never played again in the national team. In 1991, he was voted Polish Footballer of the Year.

== Post-retirement ==
After retirement, he became a youth coach and PE teacher.

== Style of play ==
Czachowski was a reliable defender who was valued for his marking. He was also an excellent tackler.

== Career statistics ==
=== International ===
Appearances and goals by national team and year
National team	Year	Apps	Goals
Poland	1989	6	0
Poland	1990	15	0
Poland	1991	11	1
Poland	1992	7	0
Poland	1993	6	0
Total		45	1

== Honours ==
Individual

- Piłka Nożna Polish Footballer of the Year: 1991
