= Petros Marinakis =

Greek footballer

Personal information
- Date of birth: 16 February 1968 (age 58)
- Place of birth: Heraklion, Greece
- Height: 1.80 m (5 ft 11 in)
- Position: Defensive midfielder

Team information
- Current team: P.A.O. Rouf (coach)

Senior career*
| Years | Team | Apps | (Gls) |
| 1988–1994 | OFI | 159 | (9) |
| 1994–1996 | Olympiacos | 38 | (5) |
| 1996–1997 | Sevilla | 11 | (0) |
| 1997–2000 | OFI | 106 | (28) |
| 2000–2001 | Ethnikos Asteras | 8 | (0) |
| 2001 | OFI | 12 | (1) |

International career
| 1991–1992 | Greece | 4 | (1) |

Managerial career
- 2020–2021: Doxa Drama (assistant manager)
- 2021–2022: AE Neapoli
- 2022–2023: Thesprotos (assistant manager)
- 2024–: P.A.O. Rouf
- * Club domestic league appearances and goals

Petros Marinakis (Greek: Πέτρος Μαρινάκης; born 16 February 1968) is a Greek retired footballer.

During a 13-year career, Marinakis made over 300 league appearances, scoring more than 40 goals, in the Greek top division. He spent two seasons playing for Olympiacos in the Greek Super League. Marinakis also had a brief spell in Spanish football with Sevilla, but he did not figure in manager José Antonio Camacho's plans and left after just six months with the club.

Marinakis made three appearances for the full Greece national football team from 1991 to 1992, scoring a goal in a Euro 1992 qualifier against Malta.
