= Turkey national football team results (2020–present) =

This article provides details of international football games played by the Turkey national football team from 2020 to present.

== Results ==
Key
Win
Draw
Defeat

=== 2020 ===
3 September 2020 2020–21 Nations League	Turkey	0–1	Hungary	Sivas, Turkey
21:45 UTC+3	Yılmaz (yellow card) 37'; Kahveci (yellow card) 90+2'	Report	Sigér (yellow card) 45'; Fiola (yellow card) 60'; Lang (yellow card) 75'; Szoboszlai 80'	Stadium: Sivas 4 Eylül Stadium; Attendance: 0 (Note: Due to the COVID-19 pandemic in Europe, all matches scheduled for September 2020 were played behind closed doors.); Referee: Artur Soares Dias (Portugal)

6 September 2020 2020–21 Nations League	Serbia	0–0	Turkey	Belgrade, Serbia
20:45 UTC+2	Kolarov (yellow card) 45+2' (yellow-red card) 49'; Tadić (yellow card) 61'; Kostić (yellow card) 62'	Report	Yazıcı (yellow card) 37'; Kabak (yellow card) 79'	Stadium: Red Star Stadium; Attendance: 0 Referee: Aleksei Kulbakov (Belarus)

7 October 2020 Friendly	Germany	3–3	Turkey	Cologne, Germany
20:45 UTC+2	Draxler 45+1'; Neuhaus 58'; Waldschmidt 81'	Report	Tufan 49'; Karaca 67'; Karaman 90+4'	Stadium: RheinEnergieStadion; Attendance: 0 Referee: Benoît Bastien (France)

11 October 2020 2020–21 Nations League	Russia	1–1	Turkey	Moscow, Russia
21:45 UTC+3	Miranchuk 28'	Report	Karaman 62'	Stadium: VTB Arena; Attendance: 5,019; Referee: Matej Jug (Slovenia)

14 October 2020 2020–21 Nations League	Turkey	2–2	Serbia	Istanbul, Turkey
21:45 UTC+3	Çalhanoğlu 57'; Tufan 76'	Report	Milinković-Savić 22'; Mitrović 49' (pen.)	Stadium: Türk Telekom Stadium; Attendance: 519; Referee: Georgi Kabakov (Bulgaria)

11 November 2020 Friendly	Turkey	3–3	Croatia	Istanbul, Turkey
20:45 UTC+3	Tosun 23' (pen.); Türüç 41'; Ünder 58'	Report	Budimir 32'; Pašalić 53'; Brekalo 56'	Stadium: Vodafone Park; Attendance: 0 Referee: Slavko Vinčić (Slovenia)
Note: Match originally scheduled for 1 June 2020 at Gradski Vrt Stadium in Osijek, but postponed due to a spike in COVID-19 cases. It was moved to Turkey instead.

15 November 2020 2020–21 Nations League	Turkey	3–2	Russia	Istanbul, Turkey
20:00 UTC+3	Karaman 26'; Ünder 32'; Tosun 52' (pen.)	Report	Cheryshev 11'; Kuzyayev 57'	Stadium: Şükrü Saracoğlu Stadium; Attendance: 0 Referee: Szymon Marciniak (Poland)

18 November 2020 2020–21 Nations League	Hungary	2–0	Turkey	Budapest, Hungary
20:45 UTC+1	Sigér 57'; Varga 90+5'	Report		Stadium: Puskás Aréna; Attendance: 0 Referee: Ivan Kružliak (Slovakia)

=== 2021 ===
24 March 2021 2022 World Cup qualification	Turkey	4–2	Netherlands	Istanbul, Turkey
20:00	Yılmaz 15', 34' (pen.), 81'; Çalhanoğlu 46'	Report	Klaassen 75'; L. de Jong 77'	Stadium: Atatürk Olympic Stadium; Attendance: 0 Referee: Michael Oliver (England)

27 March 2021 2022 World Cup qualification	Norway	0–3	Turkey	Málaga, Spain
18:00		Report	Tufan 4', 59'; Söyüncü 28'	Stadium: La Rosaleda Stadium (Note: The match, originally to be played at Ullevaal Stadion, Oslo, was moved to Estadio La Rosaleda, Málaga (Spain), due to the travel ban in response to the COVID-19 pandemic in Turkey.); Attendance: 0 Referee: Alejandro Hernández (Spain)

30 March 2021 2022 World Cup qualification	Turkey	3–3	Latvia	Istanbul, Turkey
21:45	Karaman 2'; Çalhanoğlu 33'; Yılmaz 52' (pen.)	Report	Savaļnieks 35'; Uldriķis 58'; Ikaunieks 79'	Stadium: Atatürk Olympic Stadium; Attendance: 223; Referee: Daniel Stefanski (Poland)

27 May 2021 Friendly	Turkey	2–1	Azerbaijan	Alanya, Turkey
20:00 UTC+3	Dervişoğlu 34'; Ayhan 44'	Report	Mahmudov 28'	Stadium: Bahçeşehir Okulları Stadium; Attendance: 400; Referee: Genc Nuza (Kosovo)
Note: The match was originally scheduled for 26 May 2020, but was postponed due to the COVID-19 pandemic in Turkey.

31 May 2021 Friendly	Turkey	0–0	Guinea	Antalya, Turkey
20:00 UTC+3		Report		Stadium: Antalya Stadium; Attendance: 500; Referee: Aliyar Aghayev (Azerbaijan)

3 June 2021 Friendly	Turkey	2–0	Moldova	Paderborn, Germany
19:00 UTC+2	Yılmaz 58'; Ünder 77'	Report		Stadium: Benteler-Arena; Attendance: 0 Referee: Sascha Stegemann (Germany)

11 June 2021 Euro 2020 Group A	Turkey	0–3	Italy	Rome, Italy
21:00 UTC+2	Söyüncü (yellow card) 88'; Dervişoğlu (yellow card) 90'	Report	Demiral 53' (o.g.); Immobile 66'; Insigne 79'	Stadium: Stadio Olimpico; Attendance: 12,916; Referee: Danny Makkelie (Netherlands)

16 June 2021 Euro 2020 Group A	Turkey	0–2	Wales	Baku, Azerbaijan
20:00 UTC+4	Yılmaz (yellow card) 90+2'; Çalhanoğlu (yellow card) 90+2'	Report	Ramsey 42'; Bale (penalty missed) 61'; Mepham (yellow card) 90+2'; Davies (yellow card) 90+2'; C. Roberts 90+5'	Stadium: Olympic Stadium; Attendance: 19,762; Referee: Artur Soares Dias (Portugal)

20 June 2021 Euro 2020 Group A	Switzerland	3–1	Turkey	Baku, Azerbaijan
20:00 UTC+4	Seferovic 6'; Shaqiri 26', 68'	Report	Kahveci 62'	Stadium: Olympic Stadium; Attendance: 17,138; Referee: Slavko Vinčić (Slovenia)

1 September 2021 2022 World Cup qualification	Turkey	2–2	Montenegro	Istanbul, Turkey
21:45 UTC+3	Ünder 9'; Yazıcı 31'	Report	Marušić 40'; Radunović 90+7'	Stadium: Vodafone Park; Attendance: 12,472; Referee: Benoît Bastien (France)

4 September 2021 2022 World Cup qualification	Gibraltar	0–3	Turkey	Gibraltar
20:45 UTC+2		Report	Dervişoğlu 54'; Çalhanoğlu 65'; Karaman 83'	Stadium: Victoria Stadium; Attendance: 702; Referee: Kristo Tohver (Estonia)

7 September 2021 2022 World Cup qualification	Netherlands	6–1	Turkey	Amsterdam, Netherlands
20:45 UTC+2	Klaassen 1'; Depay 16', 38' (pen.), 54'; Til 80'; Malen 90'	Report	Ünder 90+2'	Stadium: Johan Cruyff Arena; Attendance: 31,389; Referee: Daniele Orsato (Italy)

8 October 2021 2022 World Cup qualification	Turkey	1–1	Norway	Istanbul, Turkey
21:45 UTC+3	Aktürkoğlu 6'	Report	Thorstvedt 41'	Stadium: Şükrü Saracoğlu Stadium; Attendance: 21,408; Referee: Felix Brych (Germany)

11 October 2021 2022 World Cup qualification	Latvia	1–2	Turkey	Riga, Latvia
21:45 UTC+3	Demiral 70' (o.g.)	Report	Dursun 76'; Yılmaz 90+9' (pen.)	Stadium: Daugava Stadium; Attendance: 2,453; Referee: Andreas Ekberg (Sweden)

13 November 2021 2022 World Cup qualification	Turkey	6–0	Gibraltar	Istanbul, Turkey
20:00 UTC+3	Aktürkoğlu 11'; Dervişoğlu 38', 41'; Demiral 65'; Dursun 81'; Müldür 84'	Report		Stadium: Başakşehir Fatih Terim Stadium; Attendance: 8,895; Referee: Serhiy Boyko (Ukraine)

16 November 2021 2022 World Cup qualification	Montenegro	1–2	Turkey	Podgorica, Montenegro
20:45 UTC+1	Bećiraj 4'	Report	Aktürkoğlu 22'; Kökçü 60'	Stadium: City Stadium; Attendance: 2,885; Referee: Daniel Siebert (Germany)

=== 2022 ===
24 March 2022 2022 World Cup qualification play-offs	Portugal	3–1	Turkey	Porto, Portugal
19:45 UTC+0	Otávio 15'; Jota 42'; Nunes 90+4'	Report	Yılmaz 65'	Stadium: Estádio do Dragão; Attendance: 48,010; Referee: Daniel Siebert (Germany)

29 March 2022 Friendly	Turkey	2–3	Italy	Konya, Turkey
21:45 UTC+3	Ünder 4'; Dursun 83'	Report	Cristante 35'; Raspadori 39', 69'	Stadium: Konya Metropolitan Municipality Stadium; Attendance: 40,000; Referee: Enea Jorgji (Albania)

4 June 2022 2022–23 Nations League	Turkey	4–0	Faroe Islands	Istanbul, Turkey
21:45 UTC+3	Ünder 37'; Dervişoğlu 47'; Dursun 82'; Demiral 85'	Report		Stadium: Başakşehir Fatih Terim Stadium; Attendance: 9,515; Referee: Trustin Farrugia Cann (Malta)

7 June 2022 2022–23 Nations League	Lithuania	0–6	Turkey	Vilnius, Lithuania
21:45 UTC+3		Report	Sinik 2', 14'; Dursun 56' (pen.), 81'; Akgün 89'; Dervişoğlu 90+1'	Stadium: LFF Stadium; Attendance: 2,843; Referee: Novak Simović (Serbia)

11 June 2022 2022–23 Nations League	Luxembourg	0–2	Turkey	Luxembourg, Luxembourg
20:45 UTC+2		Report	Çalhanoğlu 37' (pen.); Dursun 76'	Stadium: Stade de Luxembourg; Attendance: 9,374; Referee: António Nobre (Portugal)

14 June 2022 2022–23 Nations League	Turkey	2–0	Lithuania	İzmir, Turkey
21:45 UTC+3	Ayhan 37'; Çalhanoğlu 54' (pen.)	Report		Stadium: Gürsel Aksel Stadium; Attendance: 14,694; Referee: Stéphanie Frappart (France)

22 September 2022 2022–23 Nations League	Turkey	3–3	Luxembourg	Istanbul, Turkey
21:45 UTC+3	Ünder 16' (pen.); Chanot 39' (o.g.); Yüksek 87'	Report	Da Graça 8'; Sinani 37'; Rodrigues 69'	Stadium: Başakşehir Fatih Terim Stadium; Attendance: 12,708; Referee: Tobias Stieler (Germany)

25 September 2022 2022–23 Nations League	Faroe Islands	2–1	Turkey	Tórshavn, Faroe Islands
19:45 UTC+1	Davidsen 51'; Edmundsson 59'	Report	Gürler 89'	Stadium: Tórsvøllur; Attendance: 2,056; Referee: Serhiy Boiko (Ukraine)

16 November 2022 Friendly	Turkey	2–1	Scotland	Diyarbakır, Turkey
20:00 UTC+3	Kabak 40'; Ünder 49'	Report	McGinn 62'	Stadium: Diyarbakır Stadium; Attendance: 28,348; Referee: Visar Kastrati (Kosovo)

19 November 2022 Friendly	Turkey	2–1	Czech Republic	Gaziantep, Turkey
20:00 UTC+3	Ünal 31'; Çalhanoğlu 70'	Report	Černý 56'	Stadium: Gaziantep Stadium; Attendance: 29,017; Referee: Willie Collum (Scotland)

=== 2023 ===
25 March 2023 Euro 2024 qualifying	Armenia	1–2	Turkey	Yerevan, Armenia
21:00 UTC+4	Kabak 10' (o.g.)	Report	Kökcü 35'; Aktürkoğlu 64'	Stadium: Vazgen Sargsyan Republican Stadium; Attendance: 14,125; Referee: José María Sánchez Martínez (Spain)

28 March 2023 Euro 2024 qualifying	Turkey	0–2	Croatia	Bursa, Turkey
21:45 UTC+3		Report	Kovačić 20', 45+4'	Stadium: Bursa Metropolitan Stadium; Attendance: 37,750; Referee: Andreas Ekberg (Sweden)

16 June 2023 Euro 2024 qualifying	Latvia	2–3	Turkey	Riga, Latvia
21:45 UTC+3	Emsis 51'; Tobers 90+4'	Report	Bardakci 23'; Ünder 61'; Kahveci 90+5'	Stadium: Skonto Stadium; Attendance: 6,287; Referee: Tamás Bognár (Hungary)

19 June 2023 Euro 2024 qualifying	Turkey	2–0	Wales	Samsun, Turkey
21:45 UTC+3	Nayir 72'; Güler 80'	Report		Stadium: Samsun Stadium; Attendance: 28,766; Referee: Fabio Maresca (Italy)

8 September 2023 Euro 2024 qualifying	Turkey	1–1	Armenia	Eskişehir, Turkey
21:45 UTC+3	Yıldırım 88'	Report	Dashyan 49'	Stadium: New Eskişehir Stadium; Attendance: 31,740; Referee: Daniele Orsato (Italy)

12 September 2023 Friendly	Japan	4–2	Turkey	Genk, Belgium
14:20 UTC+2	A. Ito 15'; Nakamura 28', 36'; J. Ito 78'	Report	Kabak 44'; Yıldırım 61'	Stadium: Cegeka Arena; Attendance: 7,202; Referee: Allard Lindhout (Netherlands)

12 October 2023 Euro 2024 qualifying	Croatia	0–1	Turkey	Osijek, Croatia
20:45 CEST (UTC+02:00)		Report	Yılmaz 30'	Stadium: Opus Arena; Attendance: 12,812; Referee: Anthony Taylor (England)

15 October 2023 Euro 2024 qualifying	Turkey	4–0	Latvia	Konya, Turkey
21:45 UTC+3	Akgün 58'; Tosun 83', 90'; Aktürkoğlu 87'	Report		Stadium: Konya Metropolitan Municipality Stadium; Attendance: 35,925; Referee: Enea Jorgji (Albania)

18 November 2023 Friendly	Germany	2–3	Turkey	Berlin, Germany
20:45 CET (UTC+01:00)	Havertz 5'; Füllkrug 48'	Report	Kadıoğlu 38'; Yıldız 45+2'; Sarı 70' (pen.)	Stadium: Olympiastadion; Attendance: 72,592; Referee: Bartosz Frankowski (Poland)

21 November 2023 Euro 2024 qualifying	Wales	1–1	Turkey	Cardiff, Wales
19:45 GMT (UTC+00:00)	N. Williams 7'	Report	Yazıcı 70' (pen.)	Stadium: Cardiff City Stadium; Attendance: 32,291; Referee: Matej Jug (Slovenia)

=== 2024 ===
22 March 2024 Friendly	Hungary	1–0	Turkey	Budapest, Hungary
20:45 CET (UTC+01:00)	Szoboszlai 48' (pen.)	Report		Stadium: Puskas Arena; Attendance: 54,444; Referee: Bartosz Frankowski (Poland)

26 March 2024 Friendly	Austria	6–1	Turkey	Vienna, Austria
20:45 CET (UTC+01:00)	X. Schlager 2'; Gregoritsch 44', 48', 59' (pen.); Baumgartner 78' (pen.); Entrup 90+5'	Report	Çalhanoğlu 25' (pen.)	Stadium: Ernst Happel Stadium; Attendance: 38,500; Referee: Daniele Chiffi (Italy)

4 June 2024 Friendly	Italy	0–0	Turkey	Bologna, Italy
21:00 CEST (UTC+02:00)		Report		Stadium: Stadio Renato Dall'Ara; Attendance: 25,012; Referee: Sebastian Gishamer (Austria)

10 June 2024 Friendly	Poland	2–1	Turkey	Warsaw, Poland
20:45 CEST (UTC+02:00)	Świderski 12'; Zalewski 90'	Report	Yılmaz 77'	Stadium: Stadion Narodowy; Attendance: 48,000; Referee: Balázs Berke (Hungary)

18 June 2024 Euro 2024 Group F	Turkey	3–1	Georgia	Dortmund, Germany
18:00 CEST (UTC+2)	Müldür 25'; Güler 65'; Aktürkoğlu 90+7'	Report	Mikautadze 32'	Stadium: Westfalenstadion; Attendance: 59,127; Referee: Facundo Tello (Argentina)

22 June 2024 Euro 2024 Group F	Turkey	0–3	Portugal	Dortmund, Germany
18:00 CEST (UTC+2)		Report	Silva 21'; Akaydin 28' (o.g.); Fernandes 56'	Stadium: Westfalenstadion; Attendance: 61,047; Referee: Felix Zwayer (Germany)

26 June 2024 Euro 2024 Group F	Czech Republic	1–2	Turkey	Hamburg, Germany
21:00 CEST (UTC+2)	Barák (yellow card) 11' (yellow-red card) 20'; Souček 66'; Chorý (red card) 90+8'	Report	Çalhanoğlu 51'; Tosun 90+4'	Stadium: Volksparkstadion; Attendance: 47,683; Referee: István Kovács (Romania)

2 July 2024 Euro 2024 Round of 16	Austria	1–2	Turkey	Leipzig, Germany
21:00 CEST (UTC+2)	Gregoritsch 66'	Report	Demiral 1', 59'	Stadium: Red Bull Arena; Attendance: 38,305; Referee: Artur Soares Dias (Portugal)

6 July 2024 Euro 2024 Quarter-final	Netherlands	2–1	Turkey	Berlin, Germany
21:00 CEST (UTC+2)	de Vrij 70'; Müldür 76' (o.g.)	Report	Akaydin 35'	Stadium: Olympiastadion; Attendance: 70,091; Referee: Clément Turpin (France)

6 September 2024 2024–25 Nations League	Wales	0–0	Turkey	Cardiff, Wales
19:45 BST (UTC+01:00)		Report		Stadium: Cardiff City Stadium; Attendance: 28,625; Referee: Rohit Saggi (Norway)

9 September 2024 2024–25 Nations League	Turkey	3–1	Iceland	İzmir, Turkey
21:45 TRT (UTC+03:00)	Aktürkoğlu 2', 52', 88'	Report	Pálsson 37'	Stadium: Gürsel Aksel Stadium; Attendance: 16,167; Referee: Enea Jorgji (Albania)

11 October 2024 2024–25 Nations League	Turkey	1–0	Montenegro	Samsun, Turkey
21:45 TRT (UTC+03:00)	Kahveci 69'	Report		Stadium: 19 Mayıs Stadium; Attendance: 28,829; Referee: Daniele Chiffi (Italy)

14 October 2024 2024–25 Nations League	Iceland	2–4	Turkey	Reykjavík, Iceland
18:45 WEST (UTC+01:00)	Óskarsson 3'; A. Guðjohnsen 83'	Report	Kahveci 62'; Çalhanoğlu 67' (pen.); Güler 88'; Aktürkoğlu 90+5'	Stadium: Laugardalsvöllur; Attendance: 5,260; Referee: Damian Sylwestrzak (Poland)

16 November 2024 2024–25 Nations League	Turkey	0–0	Wales	Kayseri, Turkey
20:00 TRT (UTC+03:00)	Aktürkoğlu (penalty missed) 89'	Report		Stadium: Kadir Has Stadium; Attendance: 28,812; Referee: Juan Martínez Munuera (Spain)

19 November 2024 2024–25 Nations League	Montenegro	3–1	Turkey	Podgorica, Montenegro
20:45 CET (UTC+01:00)	Krstović 29', 45', 73'	Report	Yıldız 37'	Stadium: Podgorica City Stadium; Attendance: 2,579; Referee: Urs Schnyder (Switzerland)

=== 2025 ===
20 March 2025 2024–25 Nations League promotion play-offs	Turkey	3–1	Hungary	Istanbul, Turkey
20:00 TRT (UTC+03:00)	Kökçü 9'; Aktürkoğlu 69'; Kahveci 73'	Report	Schäfer 25'	Stadium: Ali Sami Yen Spor Kompleksi; Attendance: 38,500; Referee: Ivan Kružliak (Slovakia)

23 March 2025 2024–25 Nations League promotion play-offs	Hungary	0–3 (1–6 agg.)	Turkey	Budapest, Hungary
18:00 CET (UTC+01:00)		Report	Çalhanoğlu 37' (pen.); Güler 39'; Bardakcı 90'	Stadium: Puskás Aréna; Attendance: 57,861; Referee: Felix Zwayer (Germany)

7 June 2025 Friendly	United States	1–2	Turkey	East Hartford, United States
15:40 EDT (UTC-04:00)	McGlynn 1'		Güler 24'; Aktürkoğlu 27'	Stadium: Pratt & Whitney Stadium; Attendance: 34,023; Referee: Fernando Morón (Panama)

10 June 2025 Friendly	Mexico	1–0	Turkey	Chapel Hill, United States
20:30 EDT (UTC-04:00)	Pineda 45'	Report		Stadium: Kenan Stadium; Attendance: 25,606; Referee: Moeth Gaymes (Saint Vincent and the Grenadines)

4 September 2025 2026 World Cup qualification	Georgia	2–3	Turkey	Tbilisi, Georgia
20:00 GET (UTC+04:00)	Davitashvili 63'; Kvaratskhelia 90+8'	Report	Müldür 3'; Aktürkoğlu 41', 52'	Stadium: Boris Paichadze National Stadium; Attendance: 44,238; Referee: Davide Massa (Italy)

7 September 2025 2026 World Cup qualification	Turkey	0–6	Spain	Konya, Turkey
21:45 TRT (UTC+03:00)		Report	Pedri 6', 62'; Merino 22', 45+1', 57'; Torres 53'	Stadium: Konya Metropolitan Municipality Stadium; Attendance: 32,059; Referee: Michael Oliver (England)

11 October 2025 2026 World Cup qualification	Bulgaria	1–6	Turkey	Sofia, Bulgaria
21:45 EEST (UTC+03:00)	Kirilov 13'	Report	Güler 11'; Popov 49' (o.g.); Yıldız 52', 56'; Çelik 66'; Kahveci 90+3'	Stadium: Vasil Levski National Stadium; Attendance: 10,059; Referee: Luis Godinho (Portugal)

14 October 2025 2026 World Cup qualification	Turkey	4–1	Georgia	İzmit, Turkey
21:45 TRT (UTC+03:00)	Yıldız 14'; Demiral 22', 52'; Akgün 35'	Report	Kochorashvili 64'	Stadium: Kocaeli Stadium; Attendance: 26,633; Referee: Radu Petrescu (Romania)

15 November 2025 2026 World Cup qualification	Turkey	2–0	Bulgaria	Bursa, Turkey
20:00 TRT (UTC+03:00)	Çalhanoğlu 18' (pen.); Chernev 83' (o.g.)	Report		Stadium: Centennial Atatürk Stadium; Attendance: 42,756; Referee: Nick Walsh (Scotland)

18 November 2025 2026 World Cup qualification	Spain	2–2	Turkey	Seville, Spain
20:45 CET (UTC+01:00)	Olmo 4'; Oyarzabal 62'	Report	Gül 42'; Özcan 54'	Stadium: Estadio de La Cartuja; Attendance: 30,812; Referee: Felix Zwayer (Germany)

=== 2026 ===
26 March 2026 2026 World Cup qualification play-offs	Turkey	1–0	Romania	Istanbul, Turkey
20:00 TRT (UTC+03:00)	Kadıoğlu 53'	Report		Stadium: Beşiktaş Stadium; Attendance: 38,979; Referee: François Letexier (France)

31 March 2026 2026 World Cup qualification play-offs	Kosovo	0–1	Turkey	Pristina, Kosovo
20:45 CEST (UTC+02:00)		Report	Aktürkoğlu 53'	Stadium: Fadil Vokrri Stadium; Attendance: 12,887; Referee: Michael Oliver (England)

1 June 2026 Friendly	Turkey	4–0	North Macedonia	Istanbul, Turkey
20:30 TRT (UTC+03:00)	Kökçü 2'; Uzun 16'; Gül 53'; Yılmaz 70'	Report		Stadium: Şükrü Saracoğlu Stadium; Attendance: 33,994; Referee: José Luis Munuera Montero (Spain)

6 June 2026 Friendly	Turkey	2–1	Venezuela	Fort Lauderdale, United States
18:00 EDT (UTC−04:00)	Yılmaz 44'; Akgün 54'	Report	Mendoza 13'	Stadium: Inter Miami CF Stadium; Attendance: 14,000; Referee: Daniel Quintero (Mexico)

13 June 2026 2026 World Cup Group D	Australia	2–0	Turkey	Vancouver, Canada
21:00 PDT (UTC−07:00)	Irankunda 27'; Metcalfe 75'	Report		Stadium: BC Place; Attendance: 52,497; Referee: Jesús Valenzuela (Venezuela)

19 June 2026 2026 World Cup Group D	Turkey	0–1	Paraguay	Santa Clara, United States
20:00 PDT (UTC−07:00)		Report	Galarza 2'	Stadium: Levi's Stadium; Attendance: 68,827; Referee: Iván Barton (El Salvador)

25 June 2026 2026 World Cup Group D	Turkey	3–2	United States	Inglewood, United States
19:00 PDT (UTC−07:00)	Güler 10'; Yılmaz 31'; Ayhan 90+8'	Report	Trusty 3'; Berhalter 49'	Stadium: SoFi Stadium; Attendance: 70,492; Referee: Mustapha Ghorbal (Algeria)

25 September 2026 2026–27 Nations League	Turkey	0–1	France	İzmit, Turkey
21:45 TRT (UTC+03:00)		Report	Mbappé 54'	Stadium: Kocaeli Stadium; Attendance: 28,205; Referee: Felix Zwayer (Germany)

28 September 2026 2026–27 Nations League	Turkey	1–4	Italy	Bursa, Turkey
21:45 TRT (UTC+03:00)	Yılmaz 47'	Report	Bastoni 9'; Frattesi 22'; Kayode 27'; P. Esposito 50'	Stadium: Centennial Atatürk Stadium; Attendance: 33,891; Referee: Michael Oliver (England)

2 October 2026 2026–27 Nations League	Belgium	3–0	Turkey	Liège, Belgium
20:45 CEST (UTC+02:00)	De Bruyne 10', 60'; Lukaku 76'	Report		Stadium: Stade Maurice Dufrasne; Attendance: 24,386; Referee: Rohit Saggi (Norway)

5 October 2026 2026–27 Nations League	Italy	3–1	Turkey	Bologna, Italy
20:45 CEST (UTC+02:00)	Scamacca 26'; Calafiori 65'; P. Esposito 87'	Report	Şimşir 61'	Stadium: Stadio Renato Dall'Ara; Attendance: 30,040; Referee: Szymon Marciniak (Poland)

12 November 2026 2026–27 Nations League	Turkey	1–2	Belgium	İzmir, Turkey
20:00 TRT (UTC+03:00)	Güler 20'	Report	De Bruyne 27'; De Ketelaere 30'	Stadium: Gürsel Aksel Stadium; Attendance: 19,697; Referee: Sandro Schärer (Switzerland)

15 November 2026 2026–27 Nations League	France	2–1	Turkey	Bordeaux, France
20:45 CET (UTC+01:00)	Topçu 49' (o.g.); Kroupi 80'	Report	Bardakcı 90'	Stadium: Stade Atlantique; Attendance: 40,033; Referee: Chris Kavanagh (England)

== Other unofficial games ==
5 June 2024 Training	Turkey	? – ?	Turkey Under-21s	Bologna, Italy
		(Source)

== Head to head records ==
Correct as of 12 November 2026, after the match against the Belgium.

Head to head records
Opponent	P	W	D	L	GF	GA	W%	D%	L%
Albania	12	6	2	4	13	14	50	16.67	33.33
Algeria	3	1	0	2	4	2	33.33	0	66.67
Andorra	4	4	0	0	10	0	100	0	0
Angola	1	1	0	0	3	2	100	0	0
Armenia	4	3	1	0	7	2	75	25	0
Australia	3	2	0	1	4	3	66.67	0	33.33
Austria	18	8	1	9	25	25	44.44	5.56	50
Azerbaijan	8	6	1	1	11	3	75	12.5	12.5
Belarus	4	2	1	1	8	7	50	25	25
Belgium	13	3	5	5	18	23	25	41.67	41.67
Bosnia and Herzegovina	6	2	2	2	6	7	33.33	33.33	33.33
Brazil	6	0	2	4	3	10	0	33.33	66.67
Bulgaria	29	9	6	14	42	52	31.03	20.69	48.28
Cameroon	1	0	0	1	0	1	0	0	100
Canada	2	2	0	0	6	1	100	0	0
Chile	3	2	1	0	3	0	66.67	33.33	0
China	2	2	0	0	7	0	100	0	0
Colombia	1	1	0	0	2	1	100	0	0
Costa Rica	1	0	1	0	1	1	0	100	0
Croatia	12	2	6	4	11	15	16.67	50	33.33
Czech Republic (Note: Includes the results of Czechoslovakia.)	22	7	3	12	22	46	31.82	13.64	54.55
Denmark	10	2	5	3	9	12	31.82	13.64	54.55
Ecuador	1	0	0	1	0	1	0	0	100
Egypt	6	4	0	2	13	10	66.67	0	33.33
England	11	0	2	9	1	33	0	18.18	81.82
Estonia	8	5	3	0	17	4	62.5	37.5	0
Ethiopia	2	1	1	0	3	0	50	50	0
Faroe Islands	3	1	1	1	6	3	33.33	33.33	33.33
Finland	15	5	4	6	24	22	33.33	26.67	40
France	7	1	1	5	5	14	14.29	14.29	71.43
Georgia	9	7	1	1	26	10	77.78	11.11	11.11
Germany (Note: Includes the results of West Germany.)	22	4	4	14	16	52	18.18	18.18	63.64
Ghana	2	0	2	0	3	3	0	100	0
Gibraltar	2	2	0	0	9	0	100	0	0
Greece	14	9	2	3	22	11	64.29	14.29	21.43
Guinea	1	0	1	0	0	0	0	100	0
Honduras	3	3	0	0	25	36	100	0	0
Hungary	20	7	2	11	6	5	35	10	55
Iceland	15	4	3	8	18	26	26.67	20	53.33
Iran	7	5	2	0	14	2	71.43	28.57	0
Iraq	3	2	1	0	8	1	66.67	33.33	0
Israel	6	4	0	2	9	12	66.67	0	33.33
Italy	18	0	5	13	12	35	0	27.78	72.22
Ivory Coast	1	0	1	0	1	1	0	100	0
Japan	3	1	0	2	3	5	33.33	0	66.67
Kazakhstan	6	6	0	0	19	2	100	0	0
Kosovo	4	4	0	0	13	2	100	0	0
Latvia	10	4	5	1	22	15	40	50	10
Libya	2	0	1	1	2	3	0	50	50
Liechtenstein	2	2	0	0	9	0	100	0	0
Lithuania	2	2	0	0	8	0	100	0	0
Luxembourg	9	7	1	1	18	9	77.78	11.11	11.11
Malaysia	1	1	0	0	3	0	100	0	0
Malta	6	5	1	0	15	4	83.33	16.67	0
Moldova	13	11	2	0	35	3	84.62	15.38	0
Montenegro	6	3	2	1	9	8	50	33.33	16.67
Mexico	1	0	0	1	0	1	0	0	100
Netherlands	15	4	4	7	15	23	26.67	26.67	46.67
New Zealand	1	1	0	0	2	1	100	0	0
North Macedonia	9	6	2	1	18	9	66.67	22.22	11.11
Northern Ireland	12	5	2	5	12	12	41.67	16.67	41.67
Norway	11	5	3	3	15	16	45.45	27.27	27.27
Pakistan	5	4	1	0	20	10	80	20	0
Paraguay	2	0	1	1	0	1	0	50	50
Poland	18	3	3	12	13	41	16.67	16.67	66.67
Portugal	10	2	0	8	9	22	20	0	80
Qatar	1	1	0	0	2	1	100	0	0
Republic of Ireland	14	3	6	5	16	27	21.43	42.86	35.71
Romania	28	7	7	14	26	49	25	25	50
Russia (Note: Includes the results of the Soviet Union.)	22	3	3	16	12	39	13.64	13.64	72.73
San Marino	4	3	1	0	16	1	75	25	0
Saudi Arabia	3	3	0	0	6	1	100	0	0
Scotland	2	2	0	0	4	2	100	0	0
Senegal	1	1	0	0	1	0	100	0	0
Slovakia	6	4	1	1	8	3	66.67	16.67	16.67
Slovenia	2	1	0	1	1	2	50	0	50
South Africa	1	0	0	1	0	2	0	0	100
Serbia	2	0	2	0	2	2	0	100	0
South Korea	7	4	2	1	13	4	57.14	28.57	14.29
Spain	13	1	5	7	7	25	7.69	38.46	58.33
Serbia (Note: Includes the results of Yugoslavia.)	12	1	5	6	16	28	8.33	41.67	50
Sweden	12	5	4	3	15	14	41.67	33.33	25
Switzerland	16	8	3	5	22	23	50	18.75	31.25
Syria	1	1	0	0	7	0	100	0	0
Tunisia	5	1	4	0	6	3	20	80	0
Ukraine	9	4	3	2	11	9	44.44	33.33	22.22
United States	6	3	1	2	10	9	50	16.67	33.33
Uruguay	1	0	0	1	2	3	0	0	100
Uzbekistan	1	1	0	0	2	0	100	0	0
Venezuela	1	1	0	0	2	1	100	0	0
Wales	13	5	4	4	14	14	38.46	30.77	30.77
Totals	663	264	151	248	922	947	39.88	22.81	37.46

== See also ==
- Turkey national football team results (1923–1960)
- Turkey national football team results (1961–1980)
- Turkey national football team results (1981–1999)
- Turkey national football team results (2000–2009)
- Turkey national football team results (2010–2019)
