= Turkey national football team results (2010–2019) =

This is a list of the Turkey national football team results from 2010 to 2019.

== 2010 ==
3 March 2010 Friendly	Turkey	2–0	Honduras	(Turkey) İnönü Stadium, Istanbul
20:00 UTC+2	Güngör 41'; Altıntop 55'	(Report)		Attendance: 17,000; Referee: (Slovakia) Pavel Olšiak

22 May 2010 Friendly	Czech Republic	1–2	Turkey	(United States) Red Bull Arena, Harrison
12:30 UTC-4	Černý 81'	(Report)	31' Turan; 48' Kahveci	Attendance: 16,371; Referee: (United States) Mark Geiger

26 May 2010 Friendly	Northern Ireland	0–2	Turkey	(United States) Veterans Stadium, New Britain
13:30 UTC-4		(Report)	48' Yıldırım; 72' Şentürk	Attendance: 4,000; Referee: (United States) Terry Vaughn

29 May 2010 Friendly	United States	2–1	Turkey	(United States) Lincoln Financial Field, Philadelphia
14:00 UTC-4	Altidore 58'; Dempsey 75'	(Report)	27' Turan	Attendance: 55,407; Referee: (Canada) Silviu Petrescu

11 August 2010 Friendly	Turkey	2–0	Romania	(Turkey) Şükrü Saracoğlu Stadium, Istanbul
21:15 UTC+3	Belözoğlu 82' (pen.); Turan 86'	(Report)		Attendance: 15,000; Referee: (Serbia) Milorad Mažić

3 September 2010 EURO 2012 Q.	Kazakhstan	0–3	Turkey	(Kazakhstan) Astana Arena, Astana
22:00 UTC+6		(Report)	24' Turan; 26' Altıntop; 75' Kahveci	Attendance: 15,800; Referee: (Hungary) István Vad

7 September 2010 EURO 2012 Q.	Turkey	3–2	Belgium	(Turkey) Şükrü Saracoğlu Stadium, Istanbul
21:00 UTC+3	Altıntop 48'; Şentürk 66'; Turan 78'	(Report)	28', 69' Van Buyten	Attendance: 43,538; Referee: (Slovenia) Damir Skomina

8 October 2010 EURO 2012 Q.	Germany	3–0	Turkey	(Germany) Olympiastadion, Berlin
20:45 UTC+2	Klose 42', 87'; Özil 79'	(Report)		Attendance: 74,244; Referee: (England) Howard Webb

12 October 2010 EURO 2012 Q.	Azerbaijan	1–0	Turkey	(Azerbaijan) Tofik Bakhramov Stadium, Baku
20:00 UTC+5	Sadygov 38'	(Report)		Attendance: 29,500; Referee: (Romania) Alexandru Deaconu

17 November 2010 Friendly	Netherlands	1–0	Turkey	(Netherlands) Johan Cruyff Arena, Amsterdam
20:30 UTC+1	Huntelaar 52'	(Report)		Attendance: 35,500; Referee: (Hungary) Viktor Kassai

== 2011 ==
9 February 2011 Friendly	Turkey	0–0	South Korea	(Turkey) Hüseyin Avni Aker Stadium, Trabzon
20:00 UTC+2		(Report)		Attendance: 12,000; Referee: (Ukraine) Sergii Boiko

29 March 2011 EURO 2012 Q.	Turkey	2–0	Austria	(Turkey) Şükrü Saracoğlu Stadium, Istanbul
20:30 UTC+3	Turan 28'; Gönül 78'	(Report)		Attendance: 40,420; Referee: (Czech Republic) Pavel Královec

3 June 2011 EURO 2012 Q.	Belgium	1–1	Turkey	(Belgium) King Baudouin Stadium, Brussels
20:45 UTC+2	Ogunjimi 4'	(Report)	22' Yılmaz	Attendance: 44,185; Referee: (Italy) Nicola Rizzoli

10 August 2011 Friendly	Turkey	3–0	Estonia	(Turkey) Türk Telekom Stadium, Istanbul
21:30 UTC+1	Belözoğlu 8' (pen.); Kazim-Richards 28', 35'	(Report)		Attendance: 20,000; Referee: (England) Lee Probert

2 September 2011 EURO 2012 Q.	Turkey	2–1	Kazakhstan	(Turkey) Türk Telekom Stadium, Istanbul
20:00 UTC+3	Yılmaz 31'; Turan 90+6'	(Report)	55' Konysbayev	Attendance: 47,756; Referee: (France) Clément Turpin

6 September 2011 EURO 2012 Q.	Austria	0–0	Turkey	(Austria) Ernst Happel Stadion, Vienna
20:30 UTC+2		(Report)		Attendance: 47,500; Referee: (Spain) Alberto Undiano Mallenco

7 October 2011 EURO 2012 Q.	Turkey	1–3	Germany	(Turkey) Türk Telekom Stadium, Istanbul
21:30 UTC+3	Balta 79'	(Report)	35' Gómez; 66' Müller; 86' (pen.) Schweinsteiger	Attendance: 49,532; Referee: (England) Martin Atkinson

11 October 2011 EURO 2012 Q.	Turkey	1–0	Azerbaijan	(Turkey) Türk Telekom Stadium, Istanbul
20:00 UTC+3	Yılmaz 60'	(Report)		Attendance: 32,174; Referee: (Denmark) Peter Rasmussen

11 November 2011 EURO 2012 Q.P.	Turkey	0–3	Croatia	(Turkey) Türk Telekom Stadium, Istanbul
21:05 UTC+2		(Report)	2' Olić; 32' Mandžukić; 51' Ćorluka	Attendance: 42,863; Referee: (Germany) Felix Brych

15 November 2011 EURO 2012 Q.P.	Croatia	0–0	Turkey	(Croatia) Maksimir Stadium, Zagreb
20:05 UTC+1		(Report)		Attendance: 26,371; Referee: (Portugal) Pedro Proença

== 2012 ==
29 February 2012 Friendly	Turkey	1–2	Slovakia	(Turkey) Bursa Atatürk Stadium, Bursa
20:30 UTC+2	Toprak 85'	(Report)	24' Weiss; 39' Stoch	Attendance: 13,000; Referee: (Germany) Thorsten Kinhöfer

24 May 2012 Friendly	Georgia	1–3	Turkey	(Austria) Red Bull Arena, Salzburg
20:00 UTC+2	Targamadze 52'	(Report)	12' Altıntop; 40' Şahin; 82' (pen.) İnan	Attendance: 700; Referee: (Austria) Markus Hameter

26 May 2012 Friendly	Finland	3–2	Turkey	(Austria) Red Bull Arena, Salzburg
20:00 UTC+2	Eremenko 19'; Pukki 72'; Hetemaj 90+1'	(Report)	21', 54' Yılmaz	Attendance: 1,000; Referee: (Austria) Manuel Schüttengruber

29 May 2012 Friendly	Bulgaria	0–2	Turkey	(Austria) Red Bull Arena, Salzburg
20:00 UTC+2		(Report)	22' Toprak; 90+1' Yılmaz	Attendance: 2,000; Referee: (Austria) Gerhard Grobelnik

2 June 2012 Friendly	Portugal	1–3	Turkey	(Portugal) Estádio da Luz, Lisbon
19:45 UTC+1	Nani 57'	(Report)	35', 52' Bulut; 88' (o.g.) Pepe	Attendance: 62,000; Referee: (Switzerland) Stephan Studer

5 June 2012 Friendly	Turkey	2–0	Ukraine	(Germany) Audi Sportpark, Ingolstadt
20:00 UTC+2	Erkin 30'; Pektemek 70'	(Report)		Attendance: 14,000; Referee: (Germany) Michael Weiner

15 August 2012 Friendly	Austria	2–0	Turkey	(Austria) Ernst-Happel-Stadion, Vienna
20:30 UTC+2	Kavlak 2'; Ivanschitz 6' (pen.)	(Report)		Attendance: 23,500; Referee: (Slovakia) Ján Valášek

7 September 2012 2014 WC Q.	Netherlands	2–0	Turkey	(Netherlands) Johan Cruyff Arena, Amsterdam
20:30 UTC+2	Van Persie 17'; Narsingh 90+3'	(Report)		Attendance: 49,500; Referee: (Spain) Carlos Velasco Carballo

11 September 2012 2014 WC Q.	Turkey	3–0	Estonia	(Turkey) Şükrü Saracoğlu Stadium, Istanbul
21:00 UTC+3	Belözoğlu 44'; Bulut 60'; İnan 75'	(Report)		Attendance: 44,168; Referee: (Poland) Marcin Borski

12 October 2012 2014 WC Q.	Turkey	0–1	Romania	(Turkey) Şükrü Saracoğlu Stadium, Istanbul
20:30 UTC+3		(Report)	45+1' Grozav	Attendance: 46,203; Referee: (England) Howard Webb

16 October 2012 2014 WC Q.	Hungary	3–1	Turkey	(Hungary) Ferenc Puskás Stadium, Budapest
20:30 UTC+2	Koman 31'; Szalai 50'; Gera 57' (pen.)	(Report)	22' Erdinç	Attendance: 21,563; Referee: (Italy) Daniele Orsato

14 November 2012 Friendly	Turkey	1–1	Denmark	(Turkey) Türk Telekom Stadium, Istanbul
21:00 UTC+2	Erdinç 69'	(Report)	65' (pen.) Bendtner	Attendance: 30,000; Referee: (Germany) Felix Brych

== 2013 ==
6 February 2013 Friendly	Turkey	0–2	Czech Republic	(Turkey) 19 Mayıs Stadium, Manisa
20:15 UTC+2		(Report)	4' Krejčí; 28' Lafata	Attendance: 13,000; Referee: (Netherlands) Björn Kuipers

22 March 2013 2014 WC Q.	Andorra	0–2	Turkey	Estadi Comunal, Andorra la Vella
19:15 UTC+1		(Report)	30' İnan; 45+2' Yılmaz	Attendance: 910; Referee: (Lithuania) Nerijus Dunauskas

26 March 2013 2014 WC Q.	Turkey	1–1	Hungary	(Turkey) Şükrü Saracoğlu Stadium, Istanbul
20:30 UTC+2	Yılmaz 63'	(Report)	71' Böde	Attendance: 37,904; Referee: (Serbia) Milorad Mažić

28 March 2013 Friendly	Latvia	3–3	Turkey	(Germany) MSV-Arena, Duisburg
20:45 UTC+2	Gauračs 53'; Šabala 68', 84'	(Report)	8' Şahan; 23' (pen.) İnan; 59' Sarı	Attendance: 7,245; Referee: (Germany) Thorsten Kinhöfer

31 May 2013 Friendly	Turkey	0–2	Slovenia	(Germany) Schüco Arena, Bielefeld
19:00 UTC+2		(Report)	11' Novaković; 66' Matavž	Attendance: 9,146; Referee: (Germany) Marco Fritz

14 August 2013 Friendly	Turkey	2–2	Ghana	(Turkey) Atatürk Olympic Stadium, Istanbul
21:00 UTC+3	Yılmaz 7'; Bulut 28'	(Report)	61', 75' Gyan	Attendance: 5,106; Referee: (Slovenia) Matej Jug

6 September 2013 2014 WC Q.	Turkey	5–0	Andorra	(Turkey) Kadir Has Stadium, Kayseri
21:00 UTC+3	Bulut 35', 39', 68'; Yılmaz 64'; Turan 90+3'	(Report)		Attendance: 21,923; Referee: (Luxembourg) Sven Bindels

10 September 2013 2014 WC Q.	Romania	0–2	Turkey	(Romania) Arena Națională, Bucharest
21:00 UTC+3		(Report)	22' Yılmaz; 90+5' Erdinç	Attendance: 44,537; Referee: (Norway) Svein Oddvar Moen

11 October 2013 2014 WC Q.	Estonia	0–2	Turkey	(Estonia) A. Le Coq Arena, Tallinn
21:30 UTC+3		(Report)	22' Bulut; 47' Yılmaz	Attendance: 8,572; Referee: (Italy) Nicola Rizzoli

15 October 2013 2014 WC Q.	Turkey	0–2	Netherlands	(Turkey) Şükrü Saracoğlu Stadium, Istanbul
21:00 UTC+3		(Report)	8' Robben; 47' Sneijder	Attendance: 41,814; Referee: (Portugal) Olegário Benquerença

15 November 2013 Friendly	Turkey	1–0	Northern Ireland	(Turkey) 5 Ocak Stadium, Adana
14:00 UTC+3	Erdinç 45+1'	(Report)		Attendance: 14,000; Referee: (Netherlands) Bas Nijhuis

19 November 2013 Friendly	Turkey	2–1	Belarus	(Turkey) Tevfik Sırrı Gür Stadium, Mersin
20:00 UTC+2	Bulut 4'; Yılmaz 89'	(Report)	10' Rodionov	Attendance: 18,000; Referee: (Spain) Antonio Mateu Lahoz

== 2014 ==
5 March 2014 Friendly	Turkey	2–1	Sweden	(Turkey) 19 Mayıs Stadium, Ankara
20:30 (UTC+2)	Erdinç 2'; Adın 57'	(Report)	54' Toivonen	Attendance: 19,200; Referee: (Serbia) Milorad Mažić

25 May 2014 Friendly	Republic of Ireland	1–2	Turkey	(Republic of Ireland) Aviva Stadium, Dublin
18:00 (UTC+1)	Walters 78'	(Report)	17' Özek; 75' Çamdal	Attendance: 25,191; Referee: (France) Ruddy Buquet

29 May 2014 Friendly	Honduras	0–2	Turkey	(United States) RFK Memorial Stadium, Washington
20:00 (UTC-4)		(Report)	70' Erdinç; 82' Erkin	Attendance: 20,723; Referee: (Mexico) Roberto García Orozco

1 June 2014 Friendly	United States	2–1	Turkey	(United States) Red Bull Arena, Harrison
14:00 (UTC-4)	Johnson 26'; Dempsey 52'	(Report)	90' (pen.) İnan	Attendance: 26,762; Referee: (Tunisia) Slim Jedidi

3 September 2014 Friendly	Denmark	1–2	Turkey	(Denmark) Odense Stadium, Odense
20:00 (UTC+2)	Agger 35' (pen.)	(Report)	54' Şahan; 90+2' Tufan	Attendance: 13,169; Referee: (Serbia) Milorad Mažić

9 September 2014 Euro 2016 Q	Iceland	3–0	Turkey	(Iceland) Laugardalsvöllur, Reykjavík
18:45 (UTC±0)	Böðvarsson 19'; Sigurðsson 76'; Sigþórsson 77'	(Report)		Attendance: 8,811; Referee: (Croatia) Ivan Bebek

10 October 2014 Euro 2016 Q	Turkey	1–2	Czech Republic	(Turkey) Şükrü Saracoğlu Stadium, Istanbul
21:45 (UTC+3)	Bulut 8'	(Report)	16' Sivok; 58' Dočkal	Attendance: 24,007; Referee: (Sweden) Jonas Eriksson

13 October 2014 Euro 2016 Q	Latvia	1–1	Turkey	(Latvia) Skonto stadions, Riga
21:45 (UTC+3)	Šabala 54' (pen.)	(Report)	47' Kısa	Attendance: 6,432; Referee: (Scotland) Bobby Madden

12 November 2014 Friendly	Turkey	0–4	Brazil	(Turkey) Şükrü Saracoğlu Stadium, Istanbul
20:30 (UTC+2)		(Report)	20', 60' Neymar; 24' (o.g.) Kaya; 44' Willian	Attendance: 50,509; Referee: (Uzbekistan) Ravshan Irmatov

16 November 2014 Euro 2016 Q	Turkey	3–1	Kazakhstan	(Turkey) Türk Telekom Stadium, Istanbul
20:45 (UTC+2)	Yılmaz 26' (pen.), 29'; Aziz 83'	(Report)	87' (pen.) Smakov	Attendance: 27,547; Referee: (Russia) Aleksei Eskov

== 2015 ==
28 March 2015 Euro 2016 Q	Netherlands	1–1	Turkey	(Netherlands) Johan Cruyff Arena, Amsterdam
20:45 (UTC+1)	Huntelaar 90+2'	(Report)	37' Yılmaz	Attendance: 49,500; Referee: (Germany) Felix Brych

31 March 2015 Friendly	Luxembourg	1–2	Turkey	Stade Josy Barthel, Luxembourg City
20:15 (UTC+2)	Mutsch 30'	(Report)	4' Erdinç; 87' Çalhanoğlu	Attendance: 3,653; Referee: (Malta) Alan Mario Sant

8 June 2015 Friendly	Turkey	4–0	Bulgaria	(Turkey) Recep Tayyip Erdoğan Stadium, Istanbul
20:45 (UTC+3)	Çalhanoğlu 49', 54'; Yılmaz 56', 80'	(Report)		Attendance: 3,200; Referee: (Italy) Davide Massa

12 June 2015 Euro 2016 Q	Kazakhstan	0–1	Turkey	(Kazakhstan) Central Stadium, Almaty
22:00 (UTC+6)		(Report)	83' Turan	Attendance: 25,125; Referee: (England) Michael Oliver

3 September 2015 Euro 2016 Q	Turkey	1–1	Latvia	(Turkey) Konya Büyükşehir Stadium, Konya
21:45 (UTC+3)	İnan 77'	(Report)	90+1' Šabala	Attendance: 35,391; Referee: (Sweden) Stefan Johannesson

6 September 2015 Euro 2016 Q	Turkey	3–0	Netherlands	(Turkey) Konya Büyükşehir Stadium, Konya
18:00 (19:00 UTC+3)	Özyakup 8'; Turan 26'; Yılmaz 85'	(Report)		Attendance: 41,007; Referee: (Spain) Antonio Mateu Lahoz

10 October 2015 Euro 2016 Q	Czech Republic	0–2	Turkey	(Czech Republic) Generali Arena, Prague
20:45 (20:45 UTC+2)		(Report)	62' (pen.) İnan; 79' Çalhanoğlu	Attendance: 17,190; Referee: (England) Martin Atkinson

13 October 2015 Euro 2016 Q	Turkey	1–0	Iceland	(Turkey) Konya Büyükşehir Stadium, Konya
20:45 (21:45 UTC+3)	İnan 89'	(Report)		Attendance: 39,404; Referee: (Italy) Gianluca Rocchi

13 November 2015 Friendly	Qatar	1–2	Turkey	(Qatar) Abdullah bin Khalifa Stadium, Doha
17:30 (20:30 UTC+3)	Assadalla 26'	(Report)	69' Turan; 72' Tosun	Attendance: 7,108; Referee: (Hungary) István Vad

17 November 2015 Friendly	Turkey	3–0	Greece	(Turkey) Fatih Terim Stadium, Istanbul
20:15 UTC+2		(Report)		Attendance: 17,000; Referee: (Italy) Paolo Valeri

== 2016 ==
24 March 2016 Friendly	Turkey	2–1	Sweden	(Turkey) Antalya Stadium, Antalya
20:45 UTC+2	Tosun 32', 81'	(Report)	74' Granqvist	Attendance: 33,000; Referee: (Netherlands) Danny Makkelie

29 March 2016 Friendly	Austria	1–2	Turkey	(Austria) Ernst-Happel-Stadion, Wien
20:30 UTC+2	Junuzović 22'	(Report)	43' Çalhanoğlu; 56' Turan	Attendance: 26,700; Referee: (Poland) Paweł Gil

22 May 2016 Friendly	England	2–1	Turkey	(England) City of Manchester Stadium, Manchester
17:15 UTC+1	Kane 3'; Vardy 83'	(Report)	13' Çalhanoğlu	Attendance: 44,866; Referee: (Germany) Deniz Aytekin

29 May 2016 Friendly	Turkey	1–0	Montenegro	(Turkey) Antalya Stadium, Antalya
20:45 UTC+3	Topal 90+4'	(Report)		Attendance: 30,000; Referee: (Germany) Daniel Siebert

5 June 2016 Friendly	Slovenia	0–1	Turkey	(Slovenia) Stožice Stadium, Ljubljana
20:15 UTC+2		(Report)	5' Yılmaz	Attendance: 7,209; Referee: (Italy) Marco Guida

12 June 2016 Euro 2016 G.S.	Turkey	0–1	Croatia	(France) Parc des Princes, Paris
15:00 UTC+2		(Report)	41' Modrić	Attendance: 43,842; Referee: (Sweden) Jonas Eriksson

17 June 2016 Euro 2016 G.S.	Spain	3–0	Turkey	(France) Stade de Nice, Nice
21:00 UTC+2	Morata 34', 48'; Nolito 37'	(Report)		Attendance: 33,409; Referee: (Serbia) Milorad Mažić

21 June 2016 Euro 2016 G.S.	Czech Republic	0–2	Turkey	(France) Stade Bollaert-Delelis, Lens
21:00 UTC+2		(Report)	10' Yılmaz; 65' Tufan	Attendance: 32,836; Referee: (Scotland) Willie Collum

31 August 2016 Friendly	Turkey	0–0	Russia	(Turkey) Antalya Stadium, Antalya
21:30 UTC+3		(Report)		Attendance: 31,000; Referee: (Slovenia) Damir Skomina

5 September 2016 2018 WC Q.	Croatia	1–1	Turkey	(Croatia) Stadion Maksimir, Zagreb
20:45 UTC+2	Rakitić 44' (pen.)	(Report)	45+3' Çalhanoğlu	Attendance: 0 Referee: (Poland) Szymon Marciniak

6 October 2016 2018 WC Q.	Turkey	2–2	Ukraine	(Turkey) Konya Büyükşehir Stadium, Konya
21:45 UTC+3	Tufan 45+1'; Çalhanoğlu 81' (pen.)	(Report)	24' (pen.) Yarmolenko; 27' Kravets	Attendance: 36,714; Referee: (Germany) Manuel Gräfe

9 October 2016 2018 WC Q.	Iceland	2–0	Turkey	(Iceland) Laugardalsvöllur, Reykjavík
18:45 (UTC±0)	T. Bjarnason 42'; Finnbogason 44'	(Report)		Attendance: 9,775; Referee: (England) Mark Clattenburg

12 November 2016 2018 WC Q.	Turkey	2–0	Kosovo	(Turkey) Antalya Stadium, Antalya
20:00 UTC+3	Yılmaz 51'; Şen 55'	(Report)		Attendance: 26,555; Referee: (Hungary) Tamás Bognár

== 2017 ==
24 March 2017 2018 WC Q.	Turkey	2–0	Finland	(Turkey) Antalya Stadium, Antalya
20:00 UTC+3	Tosun 9', 13'	(Report)		Attendance: 28,990; Referee: (Spain) Jesús Gil Manzano

27 March 2017 Friendly	Turkey	3–1	Moldova	(Turkey) Eskişehir Stadium, Eskişehir
19:15 UTC+3	Mor 14'; Çalık 24'; Ünder 52'	(Report)	90+1' Gînsari	Attendance: 34,930; Referee: (Kosovo) Genc Nuza

5 June 2017 Friendly	Macedonia	0–0	Turkey	(North Macedonia) Philip II Arena, Skopje
19:45 UTC+2		(Report)		Attendance: 6,000; Referee: (Bulgaria) Stanislav Todorov

11 June 2017 2018 WC Q.	Kosovo	1–4	Turkey	(Albania) Loro Boriçi Stadium, Shkodër
20:45 UTC+2	Rrahmani 22'	(Report)	6' Şen; 31' Ünder; 61' Yılmaz; 82' Tufan	Attendance: 3,758; Referee: (Czech Republic) Miroslav Zelinka

2 September 2017 2018 WC Q.	Ukraine	2–0	Turkey	(Ukraine) Metalist Stadium, Kharkiv
20:45 (21:45 UTC+3)	Yarmolenko 18', 42'	(Report)		Attendance: 36,796; Referee: (Spain) David Fernández Borbalán

5 September 2017 2018 WC Q.	Turkey	1–0	Croatia	(Turkey) Eskişehir Stadium, Eskişehir
20:45 (21:45 UTC+3)	Tosun 75'	(Report)		Attendance: 28,600; Referee: (Hungary) Viktor Kassai

6 October 2017 2018 WC Q.	Turkey	0–3	Iceland	(Turkey) Eskişehir Stadium, Eskişehir
20:45 (21:45 UTC+3)		(Report)	32' Guðmundsson; 39' Bjarnason; 49' Árnason	Attendance: 30,390; Referee: (Poland) Szymon Marciniak

9 October 2017 2018 WC Q.	Finland	2–2	Turkey	(Finland) Veritas Stadium, Turku
20:45 (21:45 UTC+3)	Arajuuri 76'; Pohjanpalo 88'	(Report)	57', 83' Tosun	Attendance: 6,612; Referee: (France) Benoît Bastien

9 November 2017 Friendly	Romania	2–0	Turkey	(Romania) CFR Cluj Stadium, Cluj-Napoca
20:15 UTC+2	Grozav 42', 69'	(Report)		Attendance: 16,000; Referee: (Portugal) Tiago Martins

13 November 2017 Friendly	Turkey	2–3	Albania	(Turkey) Antalya Stadium, Antalya
19:30 UTC+3	Ünder 47'; Akbaba 60'	(Report)	24', 39' Sadiku; 55' Grezda	Attendance: 8,000; Referee: (Bulgaria) Georgi Kabakov

== 2018 ==
23 March 2018 Friendly	Turkey	1–0	Republic of Ireland	(Turkey) Antalya Stadium, Antalya
19:30 UTC+2	Topal 52'	(Report)		Attendance: 32,000; Referee: (Slovenia) Slavko Vinčić

27 March 2018 Friendly	Montenegro	2–2	Turkey	(Montenegro) Podgorica City Stadium, Podgorica
19:10 UTC+2	Ivanić 45'; Mugoša 87'	(Report)	11' Ünder; 23' Yokuşlu	Attendance: 6,000; Referee: (Serbia) Milorad Mažić

28 May 2018 Friendly	Turkey	2–1	Iran	(Turkey) Fatih Terim Stadium, Istanbul
21:15 UTC+3	Tosun 6', 50'	(Report)	90+2' (pen.) Dejagah	Attendance: 7,500; Referee: (Uzbekistan) Valentin Kovalenko

1 June 2018 Friendly	Tunisia	2–2	Turkey	(Switzerland) Stade de Genève, Geneva
20:15 UTC+2	Badri 56'; Sassi 79'	(Report)	54' (pen.) Tosun; 90' Söyüncü	Attendance: 12,000; Referee: (Switzerland) Fedayi San

5 June 2018 Friendly	Russia	1–1	Turkey	(Russia) VEB Arena, Moscow
19:00 UTC+3	Samedov 35'	(Report)	59' Mallı	Attendance: 27,423; Referee: (Romania) Ovidiu Hațegan

7 September 2018 2018–19 NL	Turkey	1–2	Russia	(Turkey) Şenol Güneş Stadium, Trabzon
20:45 (21:45 UTC+3)	Aziz 41'	(Report)	13' Cheryshev; 49' Dzyuba	Attendance: 27,423; Referee: (Portugal) Artur Soares Dias

10 September 2018 2018–19 NL	Sweden	2–3	Turkey	(Sweden) Friends Arena, Solna
20:45 (20:45 UTC+2)	Kiese Thelin 35'; Claesson 49'	(Report)	51' Çalhanoğlu; 88', 90+2' Akbaba	Attendance: 21,832; Referee: (Spain) Jesús Gil Manzano

11 October 2018 Friendly	Turkey	0–0	Bosnia and Herzegovina	(Turkey) Rize Şehir Stadium, Rize
20:30 UTC+3		(Report)		Attendance: 15,200; Referee: (Russia) Sergei Karasev

14 October 2018 2018–19 NL	Russia	2–0	Turkey	(Russia) Fisht Olympic Stadium, Sochi
18:00 (19:00 UTC+3)	Neustädter 20'; Cheryshev 78'	(Report)		Attendance: 38,288; Referee: (Poland) Paweł Raczkowski

17 November 2018 2018–19 NL	Turkey	0–1	Sweden	(Turkey) Konya Büyükşehir Stadium, Konya
18:00 (20:00 UTC+3)		(Report)	71' (pen.) Granqvist	Attendance: 37,425; Referee: (Romania) István Kovács

20 November 2018 Friendly	Turkey	0–0	Ukraine	(Turkey) Antalya Stadium, Antalya
20:30 (UTC+3)		(Report)		Attendance: 30,420; Referee: (Kosovo) Genc Nuza

== 2019 ==
22 March 2019 Euro 2020 Q	Albania	0–2	Turkey	(Albania) Loro Boriçi Stadium, Shkodër
20:45 (UTC+1)		(Report)	21' Yılmaz; 54' Çalhanoğlu	Attendance: 11,730; Referee: (Germany) Tobias Stieler

25 March 2019 Euro 2020 Q	Turkey	4–0	Moldova	(Turkey) Eskişehir Stadium, Eskişehir
20:00 (UTC+3)	Kaldırım 24'; Tosun 26', 53'; Ayhan 70'	(Report)		Attendance: 29,456; Referee: (Ukraine) Serhiy Boyko

30 May 2019 Friendly	Turkey	2–1	Greece	(Turkey) Antalya Stadium, Antalya
21:00 (UTC+3)	Ünder 11'; Karaman 17'	(Report)	90+3' Kourbelis	Attendance: ? Referee: (Romania) Radu Petrescu

2 June 2019 Friendly	Turkey	2–0	Uzbekistan	(Turkey) Bahçeşehir Okulları Stadium, Antalya
21:00 (UTC+3)	Çelik 17', 57'	(Report)		Attendance: 9,000; Referee: (Serbia) Srđan Jovanović

8 June 2019 Euro 2020 Q	Turkey	2–0	France	(Turkey) Konya Büyükşehir Stadium, Konya
21:45 (UTC+3)	Ayhan 30'; Ünder 40'	(Report)		Attendance: 36,783; Referee: (Slovenia) Damir Skomina

11 June 2019 Euro 2020 Q	Iceland	2–1	Turkey	(Iceland) Laugardalsvöllur, Reykjavík
18:45 (UTC±0)	R. Sigurðsson 21', 32'	(Report)	40' Toköz	Attendance: 9,680; Referee: (Poland) Szymon Marciniak

7 September 2019 Euro 2020 Q	Turkey	1–0	Andorra	(Turkey) Vodafone Park, Istanbul
21:45 (UTC+3)	Tufan 89'	(Report)		Attendance: 41,188; Referee: (Scotland) Donald Robertson

10 September 2019 Euro 2020 Q	Moldova	0–4	Turkey	(Moldova) Zimbru Stadium, Chișinău
21:45 (UTC+3)		(Report)	37', 79' Tosun; 57' Türüç; 88' Yazıcı	Attendance: 8,281; Referee: (Italy) Davide Massa

11 October 2019 Euro 2020 Q	Turkey	1–0	Albania	(Turkey) Şükrü Saracoğlu Stadium, Istanbul
21:45 (UTC+3)	Tosun 90'	(Report)		Attendance: 47,000; Referee: (Romania) Ovidiu Hațegan

14 October 2019 Euro 2020 Q	France	1–1	Turkey	Stade de France, Saint-Denis
20:45 (UTC+2)	Giroud 76'	(Report)	81' Ayhan	Attendance: 72,154; Referee: (Germany) Felix Brych

14 November 2019 Euro 2020 Q	Turkey	0–0	Iceland	(Turkey) Türk Telekom Stadium, Istanbul
20:00 (UTC+3)		(Report)		Attendance: 48,329; Referee: (England) Anthony Taylor

17 November 2019 Euro 2020 Q	Andorra	0–2	Turkey	Estadi Nacional, Andorra la Vella
20:45 (UTC+1)		(Report)	17', 21' (pen.) Ünal	Attendance: 2,357; Referee: (Slovakia) Ivan Kružliak

== Other unofficial games ==
21 May 2014 Friendly	Kosovo	1–6	Turkey	(Kosovo) Adem Jashari Olympic, Mitrovica
18:00 (UTC+2)	Bunjaku 35'	(Report)	2' Özek; 34' Kısa; 49' Şahan; 54', 71' Pektemek; 87' (pen.) Potuk	Attendance: 17,000; Referee: (Albania) Bardhyl Pashaj
