= Turkey national football team results (1981–1999) =

This is a list of the Turkey national football team results from 1981 to 1999.

== 1981 ==
25 March 1981 1982 WC Q.	Turkey	0 – 1	Wales	(Turkey) 19 Mayıs Stadium, Ankara
		(Report)	68' Harris	Attendance: 35,000; Referee: (Hungary) Sándor Kúti

15 April 1981 1982 WC Q.	Turkey	0 – 3	Czechoslovakia	(Turkey) Ali Sami Yen Stadium, Istanbul
		(Report)	58' Janečka; 70' Kozák; 80' Vízek	Attendance: 35,000; Referee: (Belgium) Roger Schoeters

9 September 1981 1982 WC Q.	Iceland	2 – 0	Turkey	(Iceland) Laugardalsvöllur, Reykjavík
	L. Guðmundsson 20'; A. Eðvaldsson 66'	(Report)		Attendance: 4,292; Referee: (Republic of Ireland) Kevin O'Sullivan

23 September 1981 1982 WC Q.	Soviet Union	4 – 0	Turkey	(Soviet Union) Central Lenin Stadium, Moscow
	Chivadze 4'; Demyanenko 20'; Blokhin 26'; Shengelia 49'	(Report)		Attendance: 41,500; Referee: (Socialist Federal Republic of Yugoslavia) Damir Matovinović

7 October 1981 1982 WC Q.	Turkey	0 – 3	Soviet Union	(Turkey) Atatürk Stadium, İzmir
		(Report)	17' Shengelia; 38', 54' Blokhin	Attendance: 62,125; Referee: (West Germany) Walter Eschweiler

== 1982 ==
22 September 1982 Friendly	Hungary	5 – 0	Turkey	(Hungary) Rába ETO Stadion, Győr
	Chivadze 4'; Demyanenko 20'; Blokhin 26'; Shengelia 49'	(Report)		Attendance: 6,000; Referee: (Czechoslovakia) Josef Pouček

27 October 1982 EURO '84 Q.	Turkey	1 – 0	Albania	(Turkey) Atatürk Stadium, İzmir
	Kocabıyık 86'	(Report)		Attendance: 27,702; Referee: (Romania) Ioan Igna

17 November 1982 EURO '84 Q.	Austria	4 – 0	Turkey	(Austria) Gerhard Hanappi Stadium, Vienna
	Polster 10'; Pezzey 33'; Prohaska 38' (pen.); Schachner 52'	(Report)		Attendance: 9,614; Referee: (Poland) Aleksander Suchanek

22 December 1982 Friendly	Turkey	0 – 1	Bulgaria	(Turkey) Ali Sami Yen Stadium, Istanbul
		(Report)	79' Gospodinov	Attendance: 9,598; Referee: (Turkey) İhsan Türe

== 1983 ==
29 January 1983 Friendly	Turkey	1 – 1	Romania	(Turkey) Ali Sami Yen Stadium, Istanbul
	Yula 33' (pen.)	(Report)	9' Gabor	Attendance: 7,748; Referee: (Bulgaria) Nedyalko Tahtadzhiev

9 March 1983 Friendly	Romania	3 – 1	Turkey	(Romania) Târgu Mureş Stadium, Târgu Mureş
	Balaci 7', 19' (pen.); Bölöni 87'	(Report)	36' Çetiner	Attendance: 17,000; Referee: (East Germany) Bernd Stumpf

30 March 1983 EURO '84 Q.	Northern Ireland	2 – 1	Turkey	(Northern Ireland) Windsor Park, Belfast
	M.O'Neill 5'; McClelland 17'	(Report)	56' Şengün	Attendance: 20,000; Referee: (France) Alain Delmer

23 April 1983 EURO '84 Q.	Turkey	0 – 3	West Germany	(Turkey) Atatürk Stadium, İzmir
		(Report)	29', 71' Rummenigge; 35' Dremmler	Attendance: 59,637; Referee: (Czechoslovakia) Vojtech Christov

11 May 1983 EURO '84 Q.	Albania	1 – 1	Turkey	(Albania) Qemal Stafa Stadium, Tirana
	Çetiner 73' (o.g.)	(Report)	34' Tekin	Attendance: 15,000; Referee: (Romania) Mircea-Lucian Salomir

12 October 1983 EURO '84 Q.	Turkey	1 – 0	Northern Ireland	(Turkey) 19 Mayıs Stadium, Ankara
	Yula 17'	(Report)		Attendance: 21,096; Referee: (Soviet Union) Romualdas Yushka

26 October 1983 EURO '84 Q.	West Germany	5 – 1	Turkey	(West Germany) Olympiastadion, Berlin
	Völler 44', 65'; Rummenigge 61', 75' (pen.); Stielike 66'	(Report)	67' Şengün	Attendance: 35,000; Referee: (Socialist Federal Republic of Yugoslavia) Edvard Sostarić

16 November 1983 EURO '84 Q.	Turkey	3 – 1	Austria	(Turkey) Ali Sami Yen Stadium, Istanbul
	Tüfekçi 62'; Yula 69', 76' (pen.)	(Report)	72' Baumeister	Attendance: 21,310; Referee: (Belgium) Roger Schoeters

== 1984 ==
20 January 1984 Friendly	Egypt	1 – 0	Turkey	(Egypt) International Stadium, Cairo
	Soliman 51'	(Report)		Attendance: 6,000; Referee: (Egypt) Hossam El Din

22 January 1984 Friendly	Egypt	0 – 1	Turkey	(Egypt) Port Said Stadium, Port Said
		(Report)	44' Kayador	Attendance: 6,000; Referee: (Egypt) Şevki Halef

3 March 1984 Friendly	Turkey	1 – 2	Italy	(Turkey) İnönü Stadium, Istanbul
	Tüfekçi 65'	(Report)	2' Altobelli; 18' Cabrini	Attendance: 28,000; Referee: (Romania) Radu Petrescu

11 March 1984 Friendly	Luxembourg	1 – 3	Turkey	(Luxembourg) Port Said Stadium, Port Said
	Dresch 39'	(Report)	62' Özden; 71', 74' Tüfekçi	Attendance: 8,000; Referee: (West Germany) Karl-Josef Assenmacher

4 April 1984 Friendly	Turkey	0 – 6	Hungary	(Turkey) İnönü Stadium, Istanbul
		(Report)	22', 51' Mészáros; 38' Kardos; 49', 68' Esterházy; 63' Bodonyi	Attendance: 50,000; Referee: (West Germany) Volker Roth

6 September 1984 Friendly	Turkey	2 – 1	Soviet Union	(Turkey) Atatürk Stadium, Antalya
	Şengün 40'; Tüfekçi 75' (pen.)	(Report)	18' Ivanauskas	Attendance: 18,000; Referee: (Turkey) İlyas Ayan

26 September 1984 Friendly	Poland	2 – 0	Turkey	(Poland) Stadion 650-lecia, Słupsk
	Dziekanowski 17', 56' (pen.)	(Report)		Attendance: 22,000; Referee: (East Germany) Siegfried Kirschen

16 October 1984 Friendly	Turkey	0 – 0	Bulgaria	(Turkey) İnönü Stadium, Istanbul
		(Report)		Attendance: 6,161; Referee: (Turkey) Erkan Göksel

31 October 1984 1986 WC Q.	Turkey	1 – 2	Finland	(Turkey) Antalya Atatürk Stadium, Antalya
	Tüfekçi 78' (pen.)	(Report)	10' Hjelm; 56' Lipponen	Attendance: 7,062; Referee: (Soviet Union) Velodi Miminoshvili

14 November 1984 1986 WC Q.	Turkey	0 – 8	England	(Turkey) İnönü Stadium, Istanbul
		(Report)	13', 44', 58' Robson; 17', 61' Woodcock; 46', 56' Barnes; 86' Anderson	Attendance: 26,494; Referee: (Czechoslovakia) Vojtech Christov

22 December 1984 Friendly	Turkey	1 – 0	Luxembourg	(Turkey) İnönü Stadium, Istanbul
	Güray 39'	(Report)		Attendance: 15,000; Referee: (Bulgaria) Ahmed Yasharov

== 1985 ==
28 March 1985 Friendly	Albania	0 – 0	Turkey	(Albania) Qemal Stafa Stadium, Tirana
		(Report)		Attendance: 15,000; Referee: (Albania) Dhori Prifti

3 April 1985 1986 WC Q.	Romania	3 – 0	Turkey	(Romania) Stadionul Central, Craiova
	Hagi 21'; Cămătaru 28', 42'	(Report)		Attendance: 30,000; Referee: (Israel) Itzhak Ben Itzhak

1 May 1985 1986 WC Q.	Northern Ireland	2 – 0	Turkey	(Northern Ireland) Windsor Park, Belfast
	Whiteside 44', 54'	(Report)		Attendance: 18,000; Referee: (Switzerland) Bruno Galler

28 August 1985 Friendly	Switzerland	0 – 0	Turkey	(Switzerland) Espenmoos, St. Gallen
		(Report)		Attendance: 8,000; Referee: (Austria) Horst Brummeier

11 September 1985 1986 WC Q.	Turkey	0 – 0	Northern Ireland	(Turkey) Atatürk Stadium, İzmir
		(Report)		Attendance: 34,052; Referee: (France) Michel Vautrot

25 September 1985 1986 WC Q.	Finland	1 – 0	Turkey	(Finland) Tampere Stadium, Tampere
	Rantanen 37'	(Report)		Attendance: 5,616; Referee: (Sweden) Rune Larsson

16 October 1985 1986 WC Q.	England	5 – 0	Turkey	(England) Wembley Stadium, London
	Waddle 15'; Lineker 18', 43', 54'; Robson 35'	(Report)		Attendance: 52,500; Referee: (Soviet Union) Anatoliy Milchenko

13 November 1985 1986 WC Q.	Turkey	1 – 3	Romania	(Turkey) Atatürk Stadium, İzmir
	Tekin 78'	(Report)	15' Iorgulescu; 28' Coraş; 54' Iovan	Attendance: 19,477; Referee: (West Germany) Volker Roth

11 December 1985 Friendly	Turkey	1 – 1	Poland	(Turkey) 5 Ocak Stadium, Adana
	Çolak 66'	(Report)	26' Furtok	Attendance: 15,321; Referee: (Turkey) Talat Tokat

== 1986 ==
12 March 1986 Friendly	Turkey	1 – 0	Switzerland	(Turkey) 5 Ocak Stadium, Adana
	Altıntaş 23'	(Report)		Attendance: 17,500; Referee: (Socialist Federal Republic of Yugoslavia) Beriša Šinasi

29 October 1986 EURO '88 Q.	Yugoslavia	4 – 0	Turkey	(Socialist Federal Republic of Yugoslavia) Stadion Poljud, Split
	Vujović 25', 35', 84'; Savićević 75'	(Report)		Attendance: 11,270; Referee: (Italy) Carlo Longhi

12 November 1986 EURO '88 Q.	Turkey	0 – 0	Northern Ireland	(Turkey) Atatürk Stadium, İzmir
		(Report)		Attendance: 21,919; Referee: (Romania) Ștefan Dan Petrescu

== 1987 ==
4 March 1987 Friendly	Turkey	1 – 3	Romania	(Turkey) 19 Mayıs Stadium, Ankara
	Çolak 90' (pen.)	(Report)	44' Belodedici; 62' Bölöni; 72' (o.g.) Çoban	Attendance: 12,727; Referee: (Socialist Federal Republic of Yugoslavia) Dušan Colić

25 March 1987 Friendly	Turkey	3 – 1	East Germany	(Turkey) Ali Sami Yen Stadium, Istanbul
	Keser 45'; Kaynak 47'; Çolak 76'	(Report)	29' Minge	Attendance: 3,379; Referee: (Romania) George Ionescu

29 April 1987 EURO '88 Q.	Turkey	0 – 0	England	(Turkey) Atatürk Stadium, İzmir
		(Report)		Attendance: 16,080; Referee: (Soviet Union) Valeri Butenko

14 October 1987 EURO '88 Q.	England	8 – 0	Turkey	(England) Wembley, London
	Barnes 1', 28'; Lineker 8', 42', 71'; Robson 59'; Beardsley 62'; Webb 88'	(Report)		Attendance: 45,528; Referee: (Netherlands) Albert Thomas

11 November 1987 EURO '88 Q.	Northern Ireland	1 – 0	Turkey	(Northern Ireland) Windsor Park, Belfast
	Quinn 47'	(Report)		Attendance: 3,931; Referee: (Denmark) Peter Mikkelsen

16 December 1987 EURO '88 Q.	Turkey	2 – 3	Yugoslavia	(Turkey) Atatürk Stadium, İzmir
	Altıntaş 68'; Uçar 73'	(Report)	5' Radanović; 40' Katanec; 54' (pen.) Hadžibegić	Attendance: 4,657; Referee: (Switzerland) Bruno Galler

== 1988 ==
16 March 1988 Friendly	Hungary	1 – 0	Turkey	(Hungary) Népstadion, Budapest
	Kiprich 90'	(Report)		Attendance: 2,000; Referee: (Poland) Tadeusz Diakonowicz

21 September 1988 Friendly	Turkey	3 – 1	Greece	(Turkey) İnönü Stadium, Istanbul
	Çolak 8' (pen.); Çetin 41'; Dilmen 63'	(Report)	39' Anastopoulos	Attendance: 30,954; Referee: (West Germany) Werner Föckler

12 October 1988 1990 WC Q.	Turkey	1 – 1	Iceland	(Turkey) İnönü Stadium, Istanbul
	Karaman 73'	(Report)	63' Torfason	Attendance: 25,680; Referee: (Israel) Ovadia Ben Itzhak

2 November 1988 1990 WC Q.	Austria	3 – 2	Turkey	(Austria) Prater Stadium, Vienna
	Polster 38'; Herzog 42', 54'	(Report)	61' Uçar; 81' Çolak	Attendance: 27,000; Referee: (Italy) Tullio Lanese

30 November 1988 1990 WC Q.	Turkey	3 – 1	East Germany	(Turkey) İnönü Stadium, Istanbul
	Çolak 24', 65'; Çetin 70'	(Report)	76' Thom	Attendance: 38,873; Referee: (Hungary) Lajos Németh

== 1989 ==
29 March 1989 Friendly	Greece	0 – 1	Turkey	(Greece) Olympic Stadium, Athens
		(Report)	39' Dilmen	Attendance: 4,242; Referee: (Socialist Federal Republic of Yugoslavia) Zdravko Đokić

12 April 1989 1990 WC Q.	East Germany	0 – 2	Turkey	(East Germany) Ernst Grube Stadium, Magdeburg
		(Report)	21' Çolak; 87' Dilmen	Attendance: 23,000; Referee: (Denmark) Jan Damgaard

10 May 1989 1990 WC Q.	Turkey	0 – 1	Soviet Union	(Turkey) İnönü Stadium, Istanbul
		(Report)	41' Mykhaylychenko	Attendance: 34,553; Referee: (France) Michel Vautrot

20 September 1989 1990 WC Q.	Iceland	2 – 1	Turkey	(Iceland) Laugardalsvöllur, Reykjavík
	Pétursson 53', 69'	(Report)	85' Uçar	Attendance: 3,451; Referee: (Spain) José Pérez Sánchez

25 October 1989 1990 WC Q.	Turkey	3 – 0	Austria	(Turkey) Ali Sami Yen Stadium, Istanbul
	Dilmen 15', 53'; Uçar 62'	(Report)		Attendance: 33,465; Referee: (Czechoslovakia) Josef Marko

15 November 1989 1990 WC Q.	Soviet Union	2 – 0	Turkey	(Soviet Union) Lokomotiv Stadium, Simferopol
	Protasov 68'; Keskin 79' (o.g.)	(Report)		Attendance: 28,000; Referee: (West Germany) Dieter Pauly

== 1990 ==
11 April 1990 Friendly	Denmark	1 – 0	Turkey	(Denmark) Idrætspark, Copenhagen
	Jakobsen 47'	(Report)		Attendance: 12,100; Referee: (Belgium) Marcel Van Langenhove

27 May 1990 Friendly	Turkey	0 – 0	Republic of Ireland	(Turkey) Atatürk Stadium, İzmir
		(Report)		Attendance: 41,350; Referee: (Soviet Union) Aleksandr Kirillov

5 September 1990 Friendly	Hungary	4 – 1	Turkey	(Hungary) Megyeri úti Stadion, Budapest
	Kovács 3'; Kozma 5'; Kiprich 8', 74' (pen.)	(Report)	54' Çolak	Attendance: 1,500; Referee: (Poland) Michał Listkiewicz

17 October 1990 EURO '92 Q.	Republic of Ireland	5 – 0	Turkey	(Republic of Ireland) Lansdowne Road, Dublin
	Aldridge 15', 58', 73'; O'Leary 40'; Quinn 66'	(Report)		Attendance: 46,000; Referee: (Sweden) Erik Fredriksson

14 November 1990 EURO '92 Q.	Turkey	0 – 1	Poland	(Turkey) İnönü Stadium, Istanbul
		(Report)	37' Dziekanowski	Attendance: 30,000; Referee: (Soviet Union) Alexey Spirin

== 1991 ==
27 February 1991 Friendly	Turkey	1 – 1	Yugoslavia	(Turkey) Atatürk Stadium, İzmir
	Tütüneker 4'	(Report)	51' Savićević	Attendance: 9,634; Referee: (Bulgaria) Atanas Uzunov

27 March 1991 Friendly	Tunisia	0 – 0	Turkey	(Tunisia) Stade El Menzah, Tunis
		(Report)		Attendance: 2,000; Referee: (Algeria) Rashid Medjiba

17 April 1991 EURO '92 Q.	Poland	3 – 0	Turkey	(Poland) Polish Army Stadium, Warsaw
	Tarasiewicz 72', 80'; Kosecki 87'	(Report)		Attendance: 3,000; Referee: (Romania) Mircea Lucian Salomir

1 May 1991 EURO '92 Q.	Turkey	0 – 1	England	(Turkey) Atatürk Stadium, İzmir
		(Report)	31' Wise	Attendance: 12,316; Referee: (Germany) Wolf-Günter Wiesel

15 July 1991 Friendly	Faroe Islands	1 – 1	Turkey	(Faroe Islands) Gundadalur, Tórshavn
	Jónsson 50'	(Report)	75' Mandıralı	Attendance: 5,500; Referee: (Sweden) Bo Karlsson

17 July 1991 Friendly	Iceland	5 – 1	Turkey	(Iceland) Laugardalsvöllur, Reykjavík
	Grétarsson 2'; Guðjohnsen 26', 40', 45', 64'	(Report)	14' Karaman	Attendance: 3,177; Referee: (Sweden) Anders Frisk

21 August 1991 Friendly	Bulgaria	0 – 0	Turkey	(Bulgaria) Beroe Stadium, Stara Zagora
		(Report)		Attendance: 8,000; Referee: (Germany) Karl-Josef Assenmacher

4 September 1991 Friendly	Turkey	1 – 1	United States	(Turkey) İnönü Stadium, Istanbul
	Keser 30'	(Report)	83' Klopas	Attendance: 8,844; Referee: (Socialist Federal Republic of Yugoslavia) Zoran Petrović

16 October 1991 EURO '92 Q.	England	1 – 0	Turkey	(England) Wembley Stadium, London
	Smith 21'	(Report)		Attendance: 50,896; Referee: (Spain) Antonio Martín Navarrete

13 November 1991 EURO '92 Q.	Turkey	1 – 3	Republic of Ireland	(Turkey) İnönü Stadium, Istanbul
	Çalımbay 13' (pen.)	(Report)	8', 58' Byrne; 55' Cascarino	Attendance: 33,601; Referee: (Socialist Federal Republic of Yugoslavia) Zoran Petrović

== 1992 ==
12 February 1992 Friendly	Turkey	1 – 1	Finland	(Turkey) 5 Ocak Stadium, Adana
	Çıkırıkçı 18'	(Report)	75' Karvinen	Attendance: 12,222; Referee: (Germany) Hans-Peter Dellwing

25 March 1992 Friendly	Luxembourg	2 – 3	Turkey	Stade Municipal, Luxembourg City
	Girres 24'; Wolf 45'	(Report)	9' Karaman; 15', 66' Mandıralı	Attendance: 2,000; Referee: (Belgium) Léon Schelings

8 April 1992 Friendly	Turkey	2 – 1	Denmark	(Turkey) 19 Mayıs Stadium, Ankara
	Mandıralı 33'; Şükür 88'	(Report)	75' Elstrup	Attendance: 20,878; Referee: (Bulgaria) Atanas Uzunov

30 May 1992 Friendly	Germany	1 – 0	Turkey	(Germany) Parkstadion, Gelsenkirchen
	Völler 64'	(Report)		Attendance: 55,000; Referee: (France) Georges Ramos

26 August 1992 Friendly	Turkey	3 – 2	Bulgaria	(Turkey) Hüseyin Avni Aker Stadium, Trabzon
	Mandıralı 68'; Şükür 71', 72'	(Report)	11', 89' Stoilov	Attendance: 20,000; Referee: (Austria) Gerhard Kapl

23 September 1992 1994 WC Q.	Poland	1 – 0	Turkey	(Poland) Miejski, Poznań
	Wałdoch 33'	(Report)		Attendance: 12,000; Referee: (Germany) Markus Merk

28 October 1992 1994 WC Q.	Turkey	4 – 1	San Marino	(Turkey) 19 Mayıs Stadium, Ankara
	Şükür 37', 88'; Çıkırıkçı 86'; Mandıralı 90'	(Report)	52' Bacciocchi	Attendance: 22,303; Referee: (United Arab Emirates) Ali Bujsaim

18 November 1992 1994 WC Q.	England	4 – 0	Turkey	(England) Wembley Stadium, London
	Gascoigne 16', 62'; Shearer 28'; Pearce 61'	(Report)		Attendance: 42,984; Referee: (Sweden) Bo Karlsson

16 December 1992 1994 WC Q.	Turkey	1 – 3	Netherlands	(Turkey) İnönü Stadium, Istanbul
	Uçar 60'	(Report)	58', 87' Van Vossen; 59' Gullit	Attendance: 7,585; Referee: (Switzerland) Kurt Röthlisberger

== 1993 ==
24 February 1993 1994 WC Q.	Netherlands	3 – 1	Turkey	(Netherlands) Galgenwaard, Utrecht
	Overmars 4'; Witschge 37', 57'	(Report)	36' (pen.) Uçar	Attendance: 13,000; Referee: (Spain) Antonio Martín Navarrete

10 March 1993 1994 WC Q.	San Marino	0 – 0	Turkey	(San Marino) Stadio Olimpico, Serravalle
		(Report)		Attendance: 957; Referee: (Belgium) Michel Piraux

31 March 1993 1994 WC Q.	Turkey	0 – 2	England	(Turkey) Atatürk Stadium, İzmir
		(Report)	6' Platt; 44' Gascoigne	Attendance: 35,000; Referee: (Italy) Fabio Baldas

28 April 1993 1994 WC Q.	Norway	3 – 1	Turkey	(Norway) Ullevaal, Oslo
	Rekdal 14' (pen.); Fjørtoft 17'; Jakobsen 55'	(Report)	57' Uçar	Attendance: 21,530; Referee: (Germany) Hans-Jürgen Weber

27 October 1993 1994 WC Q.	Turkey	2 – 1	Poland	(Turkey) İnönü Stadium, Istanbul
	Şükür 51'; Korkmaz 66'	(Report)	18' Kowalczyk	Attendance: 8,326; Referee: (Austria) Alfred Wieser

10 November 1993 1994 WC Q.	Turkey	2 – 1	Norway	(Turkey) Şükrü Saracoğlu Stadium, Istanbul
	Sağlam 5', 26'	(Report)	48' Bohinen	Attendance: 12,000; Referee: (Russia) Sergei Khusainov

== 1994 ==
23 February 1994 Friendly	Turkey	1 – 4	Czech Republic	(Turkey) İnönü Stadium, Istanbul
	Sağlam 7' (pen.)	(Report)	12' Novotný; 19' Látal; 58', 65' Siegl	Attendance: 4,130; Referee: (Germany) Hans-Peter Dellwing

20 April 1994 Friendly	Turkey	0 – 1	Russia	(Turkey) Atatürk Stadium, Bursa
		(Report)	10' Radchenko	Attendance: 12,000; Referee: (Romania) Adrian Porumboiu

31 August 1994 Friendly	Macedonia	0 – 2	Turkey	(North Macedonia) Gradski Stadion, Skopje
		(Report)	44' (o.g.) Markovski; 87' Erdem	Attendance: 7,500; Referee: (Serbia and Montenegro) Dušan Colić

7 September 1994 EURO '96 Q.	Hungary	2 – 2	Turkey	(Hungary) Népstadion, Budapest
20:00 UTC+2	Kiprich 4'; Halmai 43'	(Report)	67' Şükür; 70' Korkmaz	Attendance: 20,000; Referee: (Italy) Pierluigi Pairetto

12 October 1994 EURO '96 Q.	Turkey	5 – 0	Iceland	(Turkey) Ali Sami Yen Stadium, Istanbul
20:00 UTC+2	Sancaklı 11', 26'; Şükür 27', 61'; Yalçın 66'	(Report)		Attendance: 11,280; Referee: (Russia) Nikolai Levnikov

14 December 1994 EURO '96 Q.	Turkey	1 – 2	Switzerland	(Turkey) Ali Sami Yen Stadium, Istanbul
20:00 UTC+2	R. Çetin 41'	(Report)	6' Koller; 16' Bickel	Attendance: 22,516; Referee: (Romania) Ion Crăciunescu

21 December 1994 Friendly	Italy	3 – 1	Turkey	(Italy) Stadio Adriatico, Pescara
	Crippa 44'; Lombardo 55'; Apolloni 84'	(Report)	62' Kafkas	Attendance: 5,200; Referee: (Austria) Günter Benkö

== 1995 ==
5 February 1995 Friendly	Turkey	1 – 1	Romania	(Turkey) Atatürk Stadium, İzmir
	Sancaklı 88'	(Report)	63' Sabău	Attendance: 8,581; Referee: (Bulgaria) Mitko Mitrev

8 March 1995 Friendly	Turkey	2 – 1	Israel	(Turkey) Fenerbahçe Stadium, Istanbul
	Kocaman 73'; Kaya 90'	(Report)	42' Harazi	Attendance: 6,000; Referee: (Italy) Walter Cinciripini

29 March 1995 EURO '96 Q.	Turkey	2 – 1	Sweden	(Turkey) İnönü Stadium, Istanbul
20:30 UTC+3	Aşık 63'; Yalçın 73'	(Report)	23' (pen.) K. Andersson	Attendance: 20,000; Referee: (Italy) Alfredo Trentalange

26 April 1995 EURO '96 Q.	Switzerland	1 – 2	Turkey	(Switzerland) Wankdorf Stadium, Bern
20:00 UTC+2	Hottiger 38'	(Report)	17' Şükür; 56' Temizkanoğlu	Attendance: 24,000; Referee: (Belgium) Frans van den Wijngaert

4 June 1995 Friendly	Canada	1 – 3	Turkey	(Canada) Varsity Stadium, Toronto
	Thompson 47'	(Report)	9' Özalan; 11' Temizkanoğlu; 53' Sağlam	Attendance: 9,115; Referee: (Netherlands) Mario van der Ende

7 June 1995 Friendly	Canada	0 – 3	Turkey	(Canada) Complexe Claude-Robillard, Montréal
		(Report)	69' Yalçın; 86' Temizkanoğlu; 90' Sağlam	Attendance: 2,602; Referee: (Netherlands) Mario van der Ende

11 June 1995 Friendly	Honduras	0 – 1	Turkey	(Canada) Varsity Stadium, Toronto
		(Report)	89' Kafkas	Attendance: 4,600; Referee: (Canada) Tony Camacho

17 June 1995 Friendly	Paraguay	0 – 0	Turkey	(Chile) Estadio Tierra de Campeones, Iquique
		(Report)		Attendance: 3,500; Referee: (Chile) Rafael Hormazábal Díaz

20 June 1995 Friendly	New Zealand	1 – 2	Turkey	(Chile) Estadio Municipal, Coquimbo
	Coveny 1'	(Report)	71', 75' Sağlam	Attendance: 2,500; Referee: (Chile) Mario Sánchez Yantén

22 June 1995 Friendly	Chile	0 – 0	Turkey	Estadio Nacional de Chile, Santiago
		(Report)		Attendance: 5,000; Referee: (Uruguay) Saúl Mario Feldman

30 August 1995 Friendly	Turkey	2 – 1	Macedonia	(Turkey) İnönü Stadium, Istanbul
	Temizkanoğlu 6'; Mandıralı 53'	(Report)	52' Karadžov	Attendance: 7,381; Referee: (Azerbaijan) Asim Khudiev

6 September 1995 EURO '96 Q.	Turkey	2 – 0	Hungary	(Turkey) İnönü Stadium, Istanbul
20:00 UTC+3	Şükür 9', 31'	(Report)		Attendance: 25,358; Referee: (Czech Republic) Václav Krondl

4 October 1995 Friendly	Finland	0 – 0	Turkey	(Finland) Olympic Stadium, Helsinki
		(Report)		Attendance: 3,150; Referee: (Norway) Tore Hollung

11 October 1995 EURO '96 Q.	Iceland	0 – 0	Turkey	(Iceland) Laugardalsvöllur, Reykjavík
21:00 UTC		(Report)		Attendance: 3,011; Referee: (Germany) Hartmut Strampe

15 November 1995 EURO '96 Q.	Sweden	2 – 2	Turkey	(Sweden) Råsunda Stadium, Stockholm
19:00 UTC+1	Alexandersson 24'; Pettersson 53'	(Report)	62' Şükür; 72' Sağlam	Attendance: 16,238; Referee: (Poland) Ryszard Wójcik

== 1996 ==
14 February 1996 Friendly	Turkey	3 – 2	Belarus	(Turkey) Atatürk Stadium, İzmir
	Sağlam 26' (pen.), 34' (pen.); Şentürk 76'	(Report)	8' Byalkevich; 49' Shtanyuk	Attendance: 6,732; Referee: (North Macedonia) Vanco Kocev

26 March 1996 Friendly	Czech Republic	3 – 0	Turkey	(Czech Republic) Městský stadion, Ostrava
	Suchopárek 14'; Kuka 59' (pen.), 90'	(Report)		Attendance: 10,828; Referee: (Slovakia) Karol Ihring

9 April 1996 Friendly	Azerbaijan	0 – 1	Turkey	(Azerbaijan) Tofiq Bahramov Stadium, Baku
		(Report)	48' Zafer	Attendance: 3,200; Referee: (Georgia (country)) Sergo Kvaratskhelia

1 May 1996 Friendly	Turkey	3 – 2	Ukraine	(Turkey) 19 Mayıs Stadium, Samsun
	Şükür 8'; Yiğit 14'; Kerimoğlu 33'	(Report)	10' Shevchenko; 34' Huseynov	Attendance: 18,000; Referee: (Georgia (country)) Otar Guntadze

29 May 1996 Friendly	Estonia	0 – 0	Turkey	(Estonia) Kadriorg Stadium, Tallinn
		(Report)		Attendance: 1,700; Referee: (Finland) Timo Keltonen

2 June 1996 Friendly	Finland	1 – 2	Turkey	(Finland) Olympic Stadium, Helsinki
	Litmanen 24'	(Report)	37' Kerimoğlu; 55' Sancaklı	Attendance: 9,000; Referee: (Denmark) Jørn West Larsen

11 June 1996 EURO '96	Croatia	1 – 0	Turkey	(England) City Ground, Nottingham
	Vlaović 86'	(Report)		Attendance: 22,406; Referee: (Switzerland) Serge Muhmenthaler

14 June 1996 EURO '96	Portugal	1 – 0	Turkey	(England) City Ground, Nottingham
	Couto 66'	(Report)		Attendance: 22,670; Referee: (Hungary) Sándor Puhl

19 June 1996 EURO '96	Denmark	3 – 0	Turkey	(England) Hillsborough Stadium, Sheffield
	B. Laudrup 50', 84'; A. Nielsen 69'	(Report)		Attendance: 28,671; Referee: (Russia) Nikolai Levnikov

14 August 1996 Friendly	Turkey	2 – 0	Moldova	(Turkey) İnönü Stadium, Istanbul
	Sancaklı 68', 90' (pen.)	(Report)		Attendance: 7,345; Referee: (Bosnia and Herzegovina) Salem Prolić

31 August 1996 1998 WC Q.	Belgium	2 – 1	Turkey	(Belgium) King Baudouin Stadium, Brussels
	Degryse 13'; Oliveira 38'	(Report)	61' Yalçın	Attendance: 33,024; Referee: (England) David Elleray

9 October 1996 Friendly	France	4 – 0	Turkey	(France) Parc des Princes, Paris
	Blanc 33'; Pedros 35'; Djorkaeff 51'; Pires 83'	(Report)		Attendance: 28,611; Referee: (Portugal) Jorge Coroado

10 November 1996 1998 WC Q.	Turkey	7 – 0	San Marino	(Turkey) Ali Sami Yen Stadium, Istanbul
	Derelioğlu 24', 39', 50', 59'; Şükür 55', 65'; Sağlam 80'	(Report)		Attendance: 19,654; Referee: (Moldova) Vladimir Antonov

14 December 1996 1998 WC Q.	Wales	0 – 0	Turkey	(Wales) Cardiff Arms Park, Cardiff
		(Report)		Attendance: 12,500; Referee: (Romania) Aron Huzu

== 1997 ==
12 February 1997 Friendly	Turkey	1 – 1	Finland	(Turkey) Atatürk Stadium, Denizli
	Kafkas 23'	(Report)	18' Litmanen	Attendance: 15,738; Referee: (Romania) Marcel Lică

2 April 1997 1998 WC Q.	Turkey	1 – 0	Netherlands	(Turkey) Atatürk Stadium, Bursa
	Şükür 52'	(Report)		Attendance: 17,000; Referee: (Spain) Manuel Díaz Vega

30 April 1997 1998 WC Q.	Turkey	1 – 3	Belgium	(Turkey) Ali Sami Yen Stadium, Istanbul
	Derelioğlu 35'	(Report)	12', 31', 45' Oliveira	Attendance: 21,350; Referee: (Germany) Bernd Heynemann

12 June 1997 Kirin Cup	Croatia	1 – 1	Turkey	(Japan) Yurtec Stadium Sendai, Sendai
	Erceg 21'	(Report)	77' Sağlam	Attendance: 15,687; Referee: (Japan) Masayoshi Okada

15 June 1997 Kirin Cup	Japan	1 – 0	Turkey	(Japan) Nagai Stadium, Osaka
	Morishima 25'	(Report)		Attendance: 35,029; Referee: (South Korea) Park Jong-Kyu

20 August 1997 1998 WC Q.	Turkey	6 – 4	Wales	(Turkey) Ali Sami Yen Stadium, Istanbul
	Şükür 5', 37', 72', 83'; 7' Akyüz; 61' Çetin	(Report)	18' Blake; 22' Savage; 34' Saunders; 52' Melville	Attendance: 9,710; Referee: (Poland) Marek Kowalczyk

10 September 1997 1998 WC Q.	San Marino	0 – 5	Turkey	(San Marino) Stadio Olimpico, Serravalle
		(Report)	28' (o.g.) Gobbi; 29', 81' Erdem; 75' Şükür; 78' Mandıralı	Attendance: 947; Referee: (Ukraine) Serhiy Tatulian

11 October 1997 1998 WC Q.	Netherlands	0 – 0	Turkey	(Netherlands) Amsterdam ArenA, Amsterdam
		(Report)		Attendance: 48,000; Referee: (Sweden) Leif Sundell

== 1998 ==
21 January 1998 Friendly	Turkey	1 – 4	Albania	(Turkey) Atatürk Stadium, Antalya
	Derelioğlu 71'	(Report)	15', 65' Rraklli; 67' Bushi; 88' Halili	Attendance: 20,000; Referee: (Bulgaria) Kostadin Gerginov

18 February 1998 Friendly	Israel	4 – 0	Turkey	(Israel) National Stadium, Ramat Gan
	Talesnikov 12'; Harazi 23'; Mizrahi 51', 62'	(Report)		Attendance: 10,000; Referee: (France) Rémi Harrel

22 April 1998 Friendly	Russia	1 – 0	Turkey	(Russia) Lokomotiv Stadium, Moscow
	Beschastnykh 80'	(Report)		Attendance: 7,100; Referee: (Belarus) Sergey Shmolik

5 September 1998 EURO 2000 Q.	Turkey	3 – 0	Northern Ireland	(Turkey) Ali Sami Yen Stadium, Istanbul
20:30 UTC+3	Derelioğlu 18', 58'; Havutçu 50' (pen.)	(Report)		Attendance: 19,840; Referee: (Poland) Ryszard Wójcik

10 October 1998 EURO 2000 Q.	Turkey	1 – 0	Germany	(Turkey) Atatürk Stadium, Bursa
20:00 UTC+3	Şükür 70'	(Report)		Attendance: 17,505; Referee: (Scotland) Hugh Dallas

14 October 1998 EURO 2000 Q.	Turkey	1 – 3	Finland	(Turkey) Ali Sami Yen Stadium, Istanbul
20:30 UTC+3	Temizkanoğlu 74'	(Report)	5' Paatelainen; 51' Johansson; 90+6' Litmanen	Attendance: 20,420; Referee: (Czech Republic) Václav Krondl

== 1999 ==
27 March 1999 EURO 2000 Q.	Turkey	2 – 0	Moldova	(Turkey) Ali Sami Yen Stadium, Istanbul
19:00 UTC+2	Şükür 35'; Yalçın 90+5'	(Report)		Attendance: 19,454; Referee: (Austria) Konrad Plautz

5 June 1999 EURO 2000 Q.	Finland	2 – 4	Turkey	(Finland) Olympic Stadium, Helsinki
19:00 UTC+3	Tihinen 10'; Paatelainen 14'	(Report)	25', 84' Havutçu; 34', 87' Şükür	Attendance: 36,042; Referee: (Netherlands) Dick Jol

4 September 1999 EURO 2000 Q.	Northern Ireland	0 – 3	Turkey	(Northern Ireland) Windsor Park, Belfast
15:00 UTC+1		(Report)	44', 46', 48' Erdem	Attendance: 7,270; Referee: (France) Alain Sars

8 September 1999 EURO 2000 Q.	Moldova	1 – 1	Turkey	(Moldova) Stadionul Republican, Chişinău
20:30 UTC+3	Epureanu 3'	(Report)	76' Havutçu	Attendance: 10,000; Referee: (Switzerland) Andreas Schluchter

9 October 1999 EURO 2000 Q.	Germany	0 – 0	Turkey	(Germany) Olympiastadion, Munich
19:30 UTC+2		(Report)		Attendance: 63,572; Referee: (Italy) Pierluigi Collina

13 November 1999 EURO 2000 Q.	Republic of Ireland	1 – 1	Turkey	(Republic of Ireland) Lansdowne Road, Dublin
19:00 UTC±0	Rob. Keane 79'	(Report)	83' (pen.) Havutçu	Attendance: 33,610; Referee: (Sweden) Anders Frisk

17 November 1999 EURO 2000 Q.	Turkey	0 – 0	Republic of Ireland	(Turkey) Atatürk Stadium, Bursa
20:00 UTC+2		(Report)		Attendance: 19,900; Referee: (France) Gilles Veissière
