= Turkey national football team results (2000–2009) =

This is a list of the Turkey national football team results from 2000 to 2009.

== 2000 ==
23 February 2000 Friendly	Turkey	0–2	Norway	(Turkey) Ali Sami Yen Stadium, Istanbul
20:30 UTC+2		(Report)	38' Riise; 73' Strand	Attendance: 7,000; Referee: (Greece) Giorgos Kasnaferis

11 June 2000 Euro 2000 G.S.	Turkey	1–2	Italy	(Netherlands) GelreDome, Arnhem
14:30 UTC+2	Buruk 62'	(Report)	52' Conte; 70' (pen.) Inzaghi	Attendance: 22,000; Referee: (Scotland) Hugh Dallas

15 June 2000 Euro 2000 G.S.	Sweden	0–0	Turkey	(Netherlands) Philips Stadion, Eindhoven
20:45 UTC+2		(Report)		Attendance: 28,560; Referee: (Netherlands) Dick Jol

19 June 2000 Euro 2000 G.S.	Belgium	0–2	Turkey	(Belgium) King Baudouin Stadium, Brussels
20:45 UTC+2		(Report)	45+2', 70' Şükür	Attendance: 43,000; Referee: (Denmark) Kim Milton Nielsen

24 June 2000 Euro 2000 Q.F.	Turkey	0–2	Portugal	(Netherlands) Amsterdam Arena, Amsterdam
18:00 UTC+2		(Report)	44', 56' Gomes	Attendance: 40,000; Referee: (Netherlands) Dick Jol

16 August 2000 Friendly	Bosnia and Herzegovina	2–0	Turkey	(Bosnia and Herzegovina) Koševo Stadium, Sarajevo
20:15 UTC+2	Bolić 39'; Topić 90'	(Report)		Attendance: 7,000; Referee: (North Macedonia) Delče Jakimovski

2 September 2000 2002 WC Q.	Turkey	2–0	Moldova	(Turkey) Ali Sami Yen Stadium, Istanbul
20:30 UTC+2	Buruk 45+1'; Belözoğlu 75'	(Report)		Attendance: 17,600; Referee: (Austria) Günter Benkö

7 October 2000 2002 WC Q.	Sweden	1–1	Turkey	(Sweden) Nya Ullevi, Gothenburg
16:00 UTC+2	Larsson 69'	(Report)	90+1' (pen.) Havutçu	Attendance: 42,152; Referee: (Germany) Hellmut Krug

11 October 2000 2002 WC Q.	Azerbaijan	0–1	Turkey	(Azerbaijan) Tofiq Bahramov Stadium, Baku
20:00 UTC+5		(Report)	73' Şükür	Attendance: 24,000; Referee: (Northern Ireland) Alan Snoddy

15 November 2000 Friendly	Turkey	0–4	France	(Turkey) BJK İnönü Stadium, Istanbul
21:30 UTC+2		(Report)	14' Trezeguet; 22' Wiltord; 44' Micoud; 74' Robert	Attendance: 15,000; Referee: (Greece) Giorgos Borovilos

== 2001 ==
28 February 2001 Friendly	Netherlands	0–0	Turkey	(Netherlands) Amsterdam Arena, Amsterdam
20:30 UTC+1		(Report)		Attendance: 48,500; Referee: (Finland) Mikko Vuorela

24 March 2001 2002 WC Q.	Turkey	1–1	Slovakia	(Turkey) Ali Sami Yen Stadium, Istanbul
20:00 UTC+0	Şükür 55' (pen.)	(Report)	68' Tomaschek	Attendance: 22,000; Referee: (Poland) Ryszard Wójcik

28 March 2001 2002 WC Q.	Macedonia	1–2	Turkey	(North Macedonia) Gradski Stadion, Skopje
20:00 UTC+2	T. Mičevski 20'	(Report)	68' (o.g.) I. Mitreski; 70' Davala	Attendance: 8,000; Referee: (France) Claude Colombo

25 April 2001 Friendly	Turkey	0–2	Albania	(Turkey) Kamil Ocak Stadium, Gaziantep
20:15 UTC+3		(Report)	58' Bushi; 71' Skela	Attendance: 18,000; Referee: (Israel) Meir Levi

2 June 2001 2002 WC Q.	Turkey	3–0	Azerbaijan	(Turkey) BJK İnönü Stadium, Istanbul
20:30 UTC+3	Korkut 2'; Derelioğlu 29'; Şükür 34'	(Report)		Attendance: 17,386; Referee: (Spain) Juan Ansuátegui Roca

6 June 2001 2002 WC Q.	Turkey	3–3	Macedonia	(Turkey) Atatürk Stadium, Bursa
20:30 UTC+3	Özalan 43', 57', 75'	(Report)	7' Šakiri; 20' Serafimovski; 62' Nikolovski	Attendance: 18,000; Referee: (Italy) Pasquale Rodomonti

15 August 2001 Friendly	Norway	1–1	Turkey	(Norway) Ullevaal Stadion, Oslo
19:00 UTC+3	Solskjær 74' (pen.)	(Report)	78' Şükür	Attendance: 11,456; Referee: (Finland) Mikko Vuorela

1 September 2001 2002 WC Q.	Slovakia	0–1	Turkey	(Slovakia) Tehelné Pole, Bratislava
19:45 UTC+3		(Report)	34' Şükür	Attendance: 8,723; Referee: (Portugal) Vítor Melo Pereira

5 September 2001 2002 WC Q.	Turkey	1–2	Sweden	(Turkey) Ali Sami Yen Stadium, Istanbul
20:30 UTC+3	Şükür 51'	(Report)	87' Larsson; 90+1' A. Andersson	Attendance: 22,000; Referee: (Italy) Stefano Braschi

6 October 2001 2002 WC Q.	Moldova	0–3	Turkey	(Moldova) Stadionul Republican, Chişinău
21:15 UTC+3		(Report)	8' Aşık; 78' Kahveci; 81' Mansız	Attendance: 5,000; Referee: (Belgium) Frank De Bleeckere

10 November 2001 2002 WC Q. R2	Austria	0–1	Turkey	(Austria) Ernst Happel Stadion, Vienna
20:30 UTC+1		(Report)	60' Buruk	Attendance: 48,500; Referee: (Spain) Manuel Mejuto González

14 November 2001 2002 WC Q. R2	Turkey	5–0 (6–0 agg.)	Austria	(Turkey) Ali Sami Yen Stadium, Istanbul
20:30 UTC+2	Baştürk 21'; Şükür 31'; Buruk 45'; Erdem 69', 84'	(Report)		Attendance: 22,000; Referee: (Italy) Pierluigi Collina

== 2002 ==
12 February 2002 Friendly	Turkey	0–1	Ecuador	(Netherlands) Fuji Film Stadion, Breda
20:00 UTC+1		(Report)	65' Tenorio	Attendance: 5,000; Referee: (Netherlands) Jack van Hulten

26 March 2002 Friendly	Turkey	0–0	South Korea	(Germany) Ruhrstadion, Bochum
18:00 UTC+1		(Report)		Attendance: 21,675; Referee: (Germany) Lutz Michael Fröhlich

17 April 2002 Friendly	Chile	0–2	Turkey	(Netherlands) Parkstad Limburg Stadion, Kerkrade
20:00 UTC+2		(Report)	30' Şükür; 80' Mansız	Attendance: 3,500; Referee: (Netherlands) René Temmink

23 May 2002 HKSAR Cup	South Africa	2–0	Turkey	Hong Kong Stadium, Hong Kong
20:15 UTC+8	McCarthy 58', 90'	(Report)		Attendance: 10,000; Referee: (Hong Kong) Yau Fat Jame Fong

3 June 2002 2002 WC G.S.	Brazil	2–1	Turkey	(South Korea) Munsu Cup Stadium, Ulsan
18:00 UTC+9	Ronaldo 50'; Rivaldo 87' (pen.)	(Report)	45+2' Şaş	Attendance: 33,842; Referee: (South Korea) Kim Young-Joo

9 June 2002 2002 WC G.S.	Costa Rica	1–1	Turkey	(South Korea) Munhak Stadium, Incheon
18:00 UTC+9	Parks 86'	(Report)	56' Belözoğlu	Attendance: 42,299; Referee: (Benin) Coffi Codjia

13 June 2002 2002 WC G.S.	Turkey	3–0	China	(South Korea) World Cup Stadium, Seoul
15:30 UTC+9	Şaş 6'; Korkmaz 9'; Davala 85'	(Report)		Attendance: 43,605; Referee: (Colombia) Óscar Ruiz

18 June 2002 2002 WC 1/8	Japan	0–1	Turkey	(Japan) Miyagi Stadium, Rifu
15:30 UTC+9		(Report)	12' Davala	Attendance: 45,666; Referee: (Italy) Pierluigi Collina

22 June 2002 2002 WC Q.F.	Senegal	0–1 (a.e.t.)	Turkey	(Japan) Nagai Stadium, Osaka
20:30 UTC+9		(Report)	94' Mansız	Attendance: 44,233; Referee: (Colombia) Óscar Ruiz

26 June 2002 2002 WC S.F.	Brazil	1–0	Turkey	(Japan) Saitama Stadium, Saitama
20:30 UTC+9	Ronaldo 49'	(Report)		Attendance: 61,058; Referee: (Denmark) Kim Milton Nielsen

29 June 2002 2002 WC 3rd	South Korea	2–3	Turkey	(South Korea) World Cup Stadium, Daegu
20:00 UTC+9	Lee Eul-Yong 9'; Song Chong-Gug 90+3'	(Report)	1' Şükür; 13', 32' Mansız	Attendance: 63,483; Referee: (Kuwait) Saad Mane

21 August 2002 Friendly	Turkey	3–0	Georgia	(Turkey) Hüseyin Avni Aker Stadium, Trabzon
20:30 UTC+3	Erdem 8'; Haspolatlı 51'; Kahveci 71'	(Report)		Attendance: 30,000; Referee: (Greece) Nikos Agelakis

7 September 2002 EURO 2004 Q	Turkey	3–0	Slovakia	(Turkey) Ali Sami Yen Stadium, Istanbul
20:30 UTC+3	Akın 14'; Erdem 45', 65'	(Report)		Attendance: 18,000; Referee: (Spain) Antonio Jesús López Nieto

12 October 2002 EURO 2004 Q	Macedonia	1–2	Turkey	(North Macedonia) Gradski Stadium, Skopje
19:00 UTC+2	Grozdanoski 2'	(Report)	29' Buruk; 53' Kahveci	Attendance: 11,000; Referee: (Denmark) Knud Erik Fisker

16 October 2002 EURO 2004 Q	Turkey	5–0	Liechtenstein	(Turkey) Ali Sami Yen Stadium, Istanbul
20:30 UTC+2	Buruk 7'; Davala 14'; Mansız 23'; Akın 81', 90'	(Report)		Attendance: 18,000; Referee: (Russia) Yuri Baskakov

20 November 2002 Friendly	Italy	1–1	Turkey	(Italy) Stadio Adriatico, Pescara
20:45 UTC+1	Vieri 38'	(Report)	28' Belözoğlu	Attendance: 17,560; Referee: (France) Pascal Garibian

== 2003 ==
12 February 2003 Friendly	Turkey	0–0	Ukraine	(Turkey) Atatürk Stadium, İzmir
20:30 UTC+2		(Report)		Attendance: 20,000; Referee: (Malta) Joseph Attard

2 April 2003 EURO 2004 Q	England	2–0	Turkey	(England) Stadium of Light, Sunderland
20:00 UTC+1	Vassell 75'; Beckham 90+2' (pen.)	(Report)		Attendance: 47,667; Referee: (Switzerland) Urs Meier

30 April 2003 Friendly	Czech Republic	4–0	Turkey	(Czech Republic) Na Stínadlech, Teplice
20:05 UTC+2	Rosický 2'; Koller 21'; Šmicer 27'; Baroš 38'	(Report)		Attendance: 14,156; Referee: (Hungary) Szabó Zsolt

7 June 2003 EURO 2004 Q	Slovakia	0–1	Turkey	(Slovakia) Tehelné pole, Bratislava
20:15 UTC+2		(Report)	11' Kahveci	Attendance: 15,000; Referee: (Norway) Terje Hauge

11 June 2003 EURO 2004 Q	Turkey	3–2	Macedonia	(Turkey) BJK İnönü Stadium, Istanbul
21:00 UTC+3	Kahveci 27'; Karadeniz 47'; Şükür 60'	(Report)	24' Grozdanoski; 28' Šakiri	Attendance: 23,000; Referee: (Italy) Roberto Rosetti

19 June 2003 2003 CC G.S.	Turkey	2–1	United States	(France) Stade Geoffroy-Guichard, Saint-Etienne
19:00 CEST	Yılmaz 40' (pen.); Şanlı 73'	(Report)	37' Beasley	Attendance: 16,944; Referee: (Uruguay) Jorge Larrionda

21 June 2003 2003 CC G.S.	Cameroon	1–0	Turkey	Stade de France, Saint-Denis
19:00 CEST	Geremi 90+1' (pen.)	(Report)		Attendance: 43,743; Referee: (Paraguay) Carlos Amarilla

23 June 2003 2003 CC G.S.	Brazil	2–2	Turkey	(France) Stade Geoffroy-Guichard, Saint-Etienne
21:00 CEST	Adriano 23'; Alex 90+3'	(Report)	53' Karadeniz; 81' Yılmaz	Attendance: 29,170; Referee: (Germany) Markus Merk

26 June 2003 2003 CC S.F.	France	3–2	Turkey	Stade de France, Saint-Denis
21:00 CEST	Henry 11'; Pires 26'; Wiltord 43'	(Report)	42' Karadeniz; 48' Şanlı	Attendance: 41,195; Referee: (Uruguay) Jorge Larrionda

28 June 2003 2003 CC 3rd	Colombia	1–2	Turkey	(France) Stade Geoffroy-Guichard, Saint-Etienne
18:00 CEST	Hernández 63'	(Report)	2' Şanlı; 86' Yılmaz	Attendance: 18,237; Referee: (Australia) Mark Shield

20 August 2003 Friendly	Turkey	2–0	Moldova	(Turkey) 19 Mayıs Stadium, Ankara
20:00 UTC+3	Kahveci 30'; Yılmaz 54'	(Report)		Attendance: 15,300; Referee: (Austria) Konrad Plautz

6 September 2003 EURO 2004 Q	Liechtenstein	0–3	Turkey	(Liechtenstein) Rheinpark Stadion, Vaduz
20:00 UTC+2		(Report)	14' Metin; 41' Buruk; 50' Şükür	Attendance: 3,548; Referee: (Netherlands) Dick van Egmond

9 September 2003 Friendly	Republic of Ireland	2–2	Turkey	(Republic of Ireland) Lansdowne Road, Dublin
19:30 UTC+1	Connolly 35'; Dunne 90+2'	(Report)	51' Şükür; 86' Yılmaz	Attendance: 27,200; Referee: (Netherlands) Jan Wegereef

11 October 2003 EURO 2004 Q	Turkey	0–0	England	(Turkey) Şükrü Saracoğlu Stadium, Istanbul
20:00 UTC+3		(Report)		Attendance: 42,000; Referee: (Italy) Pierluigi Collina

15 November 2003 EURO 2004 Q. R2	Latvia	1–0	Turkey	(Latvia) Skonto Stadium, Riga
20:15 UTC+2	Verpakovskis 29'	(Report)		Attendance: 9,000; Referee: (France) Gilles Veissière

19 November 2003 EURO 2004 Q. R2	Turkey	2–2 (2–3 agg.)	Latvia	(Turkey) BJK İnönü Stadium, Istanbul
20:30 UTC+2	Mansız 20'; Şükür 63'	(Report)	66' Laizāns; 78' Verpakovskis	Attendance: 37,300; Referee: (Sweden) Anders Frisk

== 2004 ==
18 February 2004 Friendly	Turkey	0–1	Denmark	(Turkey) 5 Ocak Stadium, Adana
20:30 UTC+2		(Report)	32' Jørgensen	Attendance: 21,600; Referee: (Germany) Franz-Xaver Wack

31 March 2004 Friendly	Croatia	2–2	Turkey	(Croatia) Stadion Maksimir, Zagreb
19:00 UTC+2	Šokota 2'; Srna 76'	(Report)	2' Biryol; 77' Atan	Attendance: 12,000; Referee: (Portugal) João Ferreira

28 April 2004 Friendly	Belgium	2–3	Turkey	(Belgium) King Baudouin Stadium, Brussels
20:15 UTC+2	Sonck 33'; Dufer 85'	(Report)	43' Baştürk; 68' Seyhan; 90' Karadeniz	Attendance: 20,000; Referee: (Netherlands) Dick van Egmond

21 May 2004 Friendly	Australia	1–3	Turkey	(Australia) Sydney Football Stadium, Sydney
12:00 UTC+10	Bresciano 47' (pen.)	(Report)	41' Özat; 68', 75' Şükür	Attendance: 28,326; Referee: (Japan) Toru Kamikawa

24 May 2004 Friendly	Australia	0–1	Turkey	(Australia) Telstra Dome, Melbourne
19:30 UTC+10		(Report)	44' Kahveci	Attendance: 28,953; Referee: (New Zealand) Derek Rugg

2 June 2004 Friendly	South Korea	0–1	Turkey	(South Korea) World Cup Stadium, Seoul
19:00 UTC+9		(Report)	21' Şükür	Attendance: 51,185; Referee: (Singapore) Shamsul Maidin

5 June 2004 Friendly	South Korea	2–1	Turkey	(South Korea) World Cup Stadium, Daegu
20:00 UTC+9	Yoo Sang-Chul 66' (pen.); Kim Eun-Jung 77'	(Report)	43' Şükür	Attendance: 45,284; Referee: (Japan) Toshimitsu Yoshida

18 August 2004 Friendly	Turkey	1–2	Belarus	(Turkey) Atatürk Stadium, Denizli
20:00 UTC+3	Şükür 13'	(Report)	67' V. Hleb; 90+1' Kowba	Attendance: 15,000; Referee: (Bosnia and Herzegovina) Rusmir Mrković

4 September 2004 2006 WC Q.	Turkey	1–1	Georgia	(Turkey) Hüseyin Avni Aker Stadium, Trabzon
20:00 UTC+3	Tekke 49'	(Report)	85' Asatiani	Attendance: 10,169; Referee: (Spain) Luis Medina Cantalejo

8 September 2004 2006 WC Q.	Greece	0–0	Turkey	(Greece) Karaiskakis Stadium, Piraeus
21:45 UTC+3		(Report)		Attendance: 32,182; Referee: (Sweden) Anders Frisk

9 October 2004 2006 WC Q.	Turkey	4–0	Kazakhstan	(Turkey) Şükrü Saracoğlu Stadium, Istanbul
20:00 UTC+3	Karadeniz 16'; Kahveci 50'; Tekke 89', 90+3'	(Report)		Attendance: 39,900; Referee: (Slovakia) Vladimír Hriňák

13 October 2004 2006 WC Q.	Denmark	1–1	Turkey	(Denmark) Parken Stadium, Copenhagen
20:00 UTC+2	Tomasson 27' (pen.)	(Report)	70' Kahveci	Attendance: 41,331; Referee: (Italy) Massimo De Santis

17 November 2004 2006 WC Q.	Turkey	0–3	Ukraine	(Turkey) Şükrü Saracoğlu Stadium, Istanbul
20:30 UTC+2		(Report)	9' Husyev; 17', 90+1' Shevchenko	Attendance: 40,486; Referee: (Portugal) Lucílio Batista

== 2005 ==
26 March 2005 2006 WC Q.	Turkey	2–0	Albania	(Turkey) BJK İnönü Stadium, Istanbul
20:00 UTC+3	Ateş 3' (pen.); Baştürk 5'	(Report)		Attendance: 32,000; Referee: (Austria) Konrad Plautz

30 March 2005 2006 WC Q.	Georgia	2–5	Turkey	(Georgia (country)) Mikheil Meskhi Stadium, Tbilisi
20:30 UTC+4	Amisulashvili 13'; Iashvili 40'	(Report)	12' Seyhan; 20', 35' Tekke; 72' Avcı; 89' Şanlı	Attendance: 10,000; Referee: (Norway) Terje Hauge

4 June 2005 2006 WC Q.	Turkey	0–0	Greece	(Turkey) BJK İnönü Stadium, Istanbul
21:00 UTC+3		(Report)		Attendance: 26,700; Referee: (Germany) Markus Merk

8 June 2005 2006 WC Q.	Kazakhstan	0–6	Turkey	(Kazakhstan) Central Stadium, Almaty
21:00 UTC+6		(Report)	12', 80' Tekke; 14' Toraman; 40', 90' Şanlı; 87' Altıntop	Attendance: 20,000; Referee: (Hungary) Viktor Kassai

17 August 2005 Friendly	Bulgaria	3–1	Turkey	(Bulgaria) Vasil Levski National Stadium, Sofia
20:00 UTC+3	Berbatov 24', 43'; Petrov 38'	(Report)	20' Tekke	Attendance: 3,433; Referee: (Greece) Hristoforos Zografos

3 September 2005 2006 WC Q.	Turkey	2–2	Denmark	(Turkey) BJK İnönü Stadium, Istanbul
21:00 UTC+3	Buruk 47'; Metin 80'	(Report)	41' C. Jensen; 90+3' Larsen	Attendance: 29,721; Referee: (Spain) Manuel Mejuto González

7 September 2005 2006 WC Q.	Ukraine	0–1	Turkey	(Ukraine) Olympic Stadium, Kyiv
19:15 UTC+3		(Report)	55' Metin	Attendance: 67,000; Referee: (France) Alain Sars

8 October 2005 Friendly	Turkey	2–1	Germany	(Turkey) Atatürk Olympic Stadium, Istanbul
21:00 UTC+3	Altıntop 21'; Şahin 88'	(Report)	90' Neuville	Attendance: 23,000; Referee: (Italy) Domenico Messina

12 October 2005 2006 WC Q.	Albania	0–1	Turkey	(Albania) Qemal Stafa, Tirana
18:00 UTC+3		(Report)	57' Metin	Attendance: 8,000; Referee: (Spain) Arturo Daudén Ibáñez

12 November 2005 2006 WC Q. R2	Switzerland	2–0	Turkey	(Switzerland) Stade de Suisse, Bern
20:45 CET	Senderos 41'; Behrami 86'	(Report)		Attendance: 31,130; Referee: (Slovakia) Ľuboš Micheľ

16 November 2005 2006 WC Q. R2	Turkey	4–2 (a) (4–4 agg.)	Switzerland	(Turkey) Şükrü Saracoğlu Stadium, Istanbul
20:15 EET	Şanlı 22', 36', 89'; Ateş 52' (pen.)	(Report)	2' (pen.) Frei; 84' Streller	Attendance: 42,000; Referee: (Belgium) Frank De Bleeckere

== 2006 ==
1 March 2006 Friendly	Turkey	2–2	Czech Republic	(Turkey) Atatürk Stadium, İzmir
21:00 UTC+2	Karan 86', 90'	(Report)	20' Poborský; 61' Štajner	Attendance: 58,008; Referee: (Germany) Florian Meyer

12 April 2006 Friendly	Azerbaijan	1–1	Turkey	(Azerbaijan) Tofiq Bahramov Stadium, Baku
15:00 UTC+5	Sadygov 65' (pen.)	(Report)	78' Kabze	Attendance: 26,000; Referee: (Georgia (country)) Levan Paniashvili

24 May 2006 Friendly	Belgium	3–3	Turkey	(Belgium) Fenixstadion, Genk
20:30 UTC+2	Toraman 27' (o.g.); Sonck 43'; Hoefkens 88'	(Report)	2' Ateş; 26' Kabze; 75' Şanlı	Attendance: 8,000; Referee: (Austria) Fritz Stuchlik

26 May 2006 Friendly	Ghana	1–1	Turkey	(Germany) Ruhrstadion, Bochum
20:45 UTC+2	Amoah 60'	(Report)	20' Kahveci	Attendance: 10,000; Referee: (Germany) Florian Meyer

28 May 2006 Friendly	Turkey	1–1	Estonia	(Germany) Millerntor-Stadion, Hamburg
19:00 UTC+2	Ünal 53'	(Report)	87' Neemelo	Attendance: 6,000; Referee: (Germany) Michael Weiner

31 May 2006 Friendly	Saudi Arabia	0–1	Turkey	(Germany) Stadion am Bieberer Berg, Offenbach
20:00 UTC+2		(Report)	59' Ateş	Attendance: 12,000; Referee: (Germany) Helmut Fleischer

2 June 2006 Friendly	Angola	2–3	Turkey	(Netherlands) Wagner & Partners Stadion, Sittard
20:00 UTC+2	Akwá 31'; Love 83'	(Report)	53' Ateş; 71' Kahveci; 84' Altıntop	Attendance: 2,000; Referee: (Netherlands) Jan Wegereef

4 June 2006 Friendly	Macedonia	1–0	Turkey	(Germany) Grotenburg-Stadion, Krefeld
20:00 UTC+2	Maznov 81'	(Report)		Attendance: 7,000; Referee: (Germany) Thorsten Kinhöfer

16 August 2006 Friendly	Luxembourg	0–1	Turkey	Stade Josy Barthel, Luxembourg
20:00 UTC+2		(Report)	26' Tekke	Attendance: 3,353; Referee: (Germany) Michael Weiner

6 September 2006 EURO 2008 Q	Turkey	2–0	Malta	(Germany) Commerzbank-Arena, Frankfurt
20:00 UTC+2	Kahveci 55'; Metin 77'	(Report)		Attendance: 0 Referee: (Spain) Bernardino González Vázquez

7 October 2006 EURO 2008 Q	Hungary	0–1	Turkey	(Hungary) Stadium Puskás Ferenc, Budapest
19:00 UTC+2		(Report)	39' Şanlı	Attendance: 9,500; Referee: (Luxembourg) Alain Hamer

11 October 2006 EURO 2008 Q	Turkey	5–0	Moldova	(Germany) Commerzbank-Arena, Frankfurt
20:00 UTC+2	Şükür 35', 37' (pen.), 43', 73'; Şanlı 69'	(Report)		Attendance: 0 Referee: (Denmark) Nicolai Vollquartz

15 November 2006 Friendly	Italy	1–1	Turkey	(Italy) Stadio Atleti Azzurri d'Italia, Bergamo
20:50 UTC+1	Di Natale 38'	(Report)	41' (o.g.) Materazzi	Attendance: 21,334; Referee: (Switzerland) Massimo Busacca

== 2007 ==
7 February 2007 Friendly	Georgia	1–0	Turkey	(Georgia (country)) Boris Paichadze National Stadium, Tbilisi
21:00 UTC+4	Siradze 76'	(Report)		Attendance: 53,000; Referee: (Latvia) Romāns Lajuks

24 March 2007 EURO 2008 Q	Greece	1–4	Turkey	(Greece) Karaiskákis Stadium, Athens
21:30 UTC+2	Kyrgiakos 5'	(Report)	26' Şanlı; 54' Ünal; 70' Metin; 81' Karadeniz	Attendance: 33,000; Referee: (Germany) Wolfgang Stark

28 March 2007 EURO 2008 Q	Turkey	2–2	Norway	(Germany) Commerzbank-Arena, Frankfurt
20:00 UTC+2	Altıntop 71', 90'	(Report)	31' Brenne; 40' Andresen	Attendance: 0 Referee: (Italy) Stefano Farina

2 June 2007 EURO 2008 Q	Bosnia and Herzegovina	3–2	Turkey	(Bosnia and Herzegovina) Asim Ferhatović Hase, Sarajevo
20:00 UTC+2	Muslimović 27'; Džeko 45+2'; Ćustović 89'	(Report)	13' Şükür; 38' Sarıoğlu	Attendance: 20,000; Referee: (Sweden) Peter Fröjdfeldt

5 June 2007 Friendly	Brazil	0–0	Turkey	(Germany) Signal Iduna Park, Dortmund
20:15 UTC+2		(Report)		Attendance: 26,700; Referee: (Germany) Florian Meyer

22 August 2007 Friendly	Romania	2–0	Turkey	(Romania) Stadionul Național, Bucharest
21:00 UTC+3	Dică 61'; Mutu 70'	(Report)		Attendance: 12,000; Referee: (Germany) Markus Merk

8 September 2007 EURO 2008 Q	Malta	2–2	Turkey	(Malta) Ta' Qali Stadium, Ta' Qali
19:30 UTC+2	Said 40'; Schembri 74'	(Report)	44' Altıntop; 76' Çetin	Attendance: 12,000; Referee: (Austria) Stefan Messner

12 September 2007 EURO 2008 Q	Turkey	3–0	Hungary	(Turkey) BJK İnönü Stadium, Istanbul
20:30 UTC+3	Ünal 68'; Aurélio 73'; Altıntop 90+3'	(Report)		Attendance: 28,020; Referee: (Scotland) Stuart Dougal

13 October 2007 EURO 2008 Q	Moldova	1–1	Turkey	(Moldova) Zimbru Stadium, Chişinău
21:00 UTC+3	Frunză 12'	(Report)	62' Karan	Attendance: 9,815; Referee: (England) Martin Atkinson

17 October 2007 EURO 2008 Q	Turkey	0–1	Greece	(Turkey) Ali Sami Yen Stadium, Istanbul
20:30 UTC+3		(Report)	79' Amanatidis	Attendance: 22,818; Referee: (Spain) Manuel Mejuto González

17 November 2007 EURO 2008 Q	Norway	1–2	Turkey	(Norway) Ullevaal Stadion, Oslo
19:00 UTC+1	Hagen 12'	(Report)	31' Belözoğlu; 60' Kahveci	Attendance: 23,783; Referee: (Germany) Markus Merk

21 November 2007 EURO 2008 Q	Turkey	1–0	Bosnia and Herzegovina	(Turkey) Ali Sami Yen Stadium, Istanbul
21:00 UTC+2	Kahveci 43'	(Report)		Attendance: 20,106; Referee: (Netherlands) Eric Braamhaar

== 2008 ==
6 February 2008 Friendly	Turkey	0–0	Sweden	(Turkey) BJK İnönü Stadium, Istanbul
20:35 UTC+2		(Report)		Attendance: 20,000; Referee: (Italy) Paolo Tagliavento

26 March 2008 Friendly	Belarus	2–2	Turkey	(Belarus) Dinamo Stadium, Minsk
20:00 UTC+3	Kutuzov 35'; V. Hleb 64'	(Report)	38' Şanlı; 71' Metin	Attendance: 12,000; Referee: (Lithuania) Paulius Malžinskas

20 May 2008 Friendly	Slovakia	0–1	Turkey	(Germany) SchücoArena, Bielefeld
20:30 UTC+2		(Report)	63' Balta	Attendance: 13,100; Referee: (Germany) Michael Weiner

25 May 2008 Friendly	Uruguay	3–2	Turkey	(Germany) Rewirpowerstadion, Bochum
20:30 UTC+2	Suárez 31' (pen.), 78'; Rodríguez 85' (pen.)	(Report)	13' Turan; 51' Kahveci	Attendance: 13,786; Referee: (Germany) Florian Meyer

29 May 2008 Friendly	Finland	0–2	Turkey	(Germany) MSV-Arena, Duisburg
20:30 UTC+2		(Report)	15' Şanlı; 88' Şentürk	Attendance: 15,036; Referee: (Germany) Thorsten Kinhöfer

7 June 2008 EURO 2008 G.S.	Portugal	2–0	Turkey	(Switzerland) Stade de Genève, Geneva
20:45 UTC+1	Pepe 61'; Meireles 90+3'	(Report)		Attendance: 29,106; Referee: (Germany) Herbert Fandel

11 June 2008 EURO 2008 G.S.	Switzerland	1–2	Turkey	(Switzerland) St. Jakob-Park, Basel
20:45 UTC+1	Yakin 32'	(Report)	57' Şentürk; 90+2' Turan	Attendance: 39,730; Referee: (Slovakia) Ľuboš Micheľ

15 June 2008 EURO 2008 G.S.	Turkey	3–2	Czech Republic	(Switzerland) Stade de Genève, Geneva
20:45 UTC+1	Turan 75'; Kahveci 87', 89'	(Report)	34' Koller; 62' Plašil	Attendance: 29,016; Referee: (Sweden) Peter Fröjdfeldt

20 June 2008 EURO 2008 Q.F.	Croatia	1–1 (a.e.t.) (1–3 p)	Turkey	(Austria) Ernst-Happel-Stadion, Vienna
20:45 UTC+1	Klasnić 119'	(Report)	120+1' Şentürk	Attendance: 51,428; Referee: (Italy) Roberto Rosetti
	Penalties
	Modrić (penalty missed); Srna (penalty scored); Rakitić (penalty missed); Petrić (penalty missed)		(penalty scored) Turan; (penalty scored) Şentürk; (penalty scored) Hamit

25 June 2008 EURO 2008 S.F.	Germany	3–2	Turkey	(Switzerland) St. Jakob-Park, Basel
20:45 UTC+1	Schweinsteiger 26'; Klose 79'; Lahm 90'	(Report)	22' Boral; 86' Şentürk	Attendance: 39,374; Referee: (Switzerland) Massimo Busacca

20 August 2008 Friendly	Turkey	1–0	Chile	(Turkey) İsmetpaşa Stadium, Kocaeli
20:45 UTC+2	Altıntop 74'	(Report)		Attendance: 12,710; Referee: (Greece) Anastasios Kakos

6 September 2008 2010 WC Q.	Armenia	0–2	Turkey	(Armenia) Hrazdan Stadium, Yerevan
21:00 UTC+5		(Report)	61' Şanlı; 77' Şentürk	Attendance: 30,000; Referee: (Norway) Tom Henning Øvrebø

10 September 2008 2010 WC Q.	Turkey	1–1	Belgium	(Turkey) Şükrü Saracoğlu Stadium, Istanbul
21:00 UTC+3	Belözoğlu 74' (pen.)	(Report)	32' Sonck	Attendance: 34,097; Referee: (France) Stéphane Lannoy

11 October 2008 2010 WC Q.	Turkey	2–1	Bosnia and Herzegovina	(Turkey) BJK İnönü Stadium, Istanbul
21:00 UTC+3	Turan 51'; Erdinç 66'	(Report)	27' Džeko	Attendance: 23,628; Referee: (Hungary) Viktor Kassai

15 October 2008 2010 WC Q.	Estonia	0–0	Turkey	(Estonia) A. Le Coq Arena, Tallinn
21:30 UTC+3		(Report)		Attendance: 6,500; Referee: (Poland) Robert Małek

19 November 2008 Friendly	Austria	2–4	Turkey	(Austria) Ernst Happel Stadion, Vienna
20:30 UTC+1	Hölzl 28', 53'	(Report)	38' Aurélio; 41', 47', 62' Şanlı	Attendance: 23,100; Referee: (Germany) Manuel Gräfe

== 2009 ==
11 February 2009 Friendly	Turkey	1–1	Ivory Coast	(Turkey) Atatürk Stadium, İzmir
20:30 UTC+2	Ünal 11'	(Report)	90+2' Drogba	Attendance: 25,234; Referee: (Romania) Sorin Corpodean

28 March 2009 2010 WC Q.	Spain	1–0	Turkey	(Spain) Santiago Bernabéu, Madrid
22:00 CET	Piqué 59'	(Report)		Attendance: 73,820; Referee: (Switzerland) Massimo Busacca

1 April 2009 2010 WC Q.	Turkey	1–2	Spain	(Turkey) Ali Sami Yen Stadium, Istanbul
20:00 CEST	Şentürk 25'	(Report)	62' (pen.) Alonso; 90+1' Riera	Attendance: 19,617; Referee: (England) Mike Riley

2 June 2009 Friendly	Turkey	2–0	Azerbaijan	(Turkey) Kadir Has Stadium, Kayseri
20:00 UTC+3	Altıntop 70'; Üzülmez 75'	(Report)		Attendance: 32,864; Referee: (Slovakia) Mario Vlk

5 June 2009 Friendly	France	1–0	Turkey	(France) Stade de Gerland, Lyon
21:00 UTC+2	Benzema 38' (pen.)	(Report)		Attendance: 41,044; Referee: (Germany) Manuel Gräfe

12 August 2009 Friendly	Ukraine	0–3	Turkey	(Ukraine) Lobanovskyi Dynamo Stadium, Kyiv
21:00 UTC+3		(Report)	58' Şanlı; 63' Çetin; 75' Altıntop	Attendance: 8,000; Referee: (Slovenia) Darko Čeferin

5 September 2009 2010 WC Q.	Turkey	4–2	Estonia	(Turkey) Kadir Has Stadium, Kayseri
21:00 UTC+3	Şanlı 29', 72'; Yıldırım 37'; Turan 62'	(Report)	7' Voskoboinikov; 52' Vassiljev	Attendance: 28,569; Referee: (Norway) Tommy Skjerven

9 September 2009 2010 WC Q.	Bosnia and Herzegovina	1–1	Turkey	(Bosnia and Herzegovina) Bilino Polje, Zenica
20:00 UTC+2	Salihović 25'	(Report)	5' Belözoğlu	Attendance: 14,000; Referee: (Portugal) Olegário Benquerença

10 October 2009 2010 WC Q.	Belgium	2–0	Turkey	(Belgium) King Baudouin Stadium, Brussels
20:45 UTC+2	Mpenza 8', 84'	(Report)		Attendance: 30,131; Referee: (Italy) Matteo Trefoloni

14 October 2009 2010 WC Q.	Turkey	2–0	Armenia	(Turkey) Bursa Atatürk Stadium, Bursa
21:00 UTC+3	Altıntop 16'; Çetin 28'	(Report)		Attendance: 16,200; Referee: (Sweden) Martin Hansson

== Other unofficial games ==
20 May 2002 HKSAR Reunification Cup	Hong Kong League XI	0–2	Turkey	Hong Kong Stadium, Hong Kong
		(Report)	Şükür 21' (pen.); Şaş 45'	Referee: (Thailand) Hamlumyoung Panya

4 August 2004 Suat Kaya Testimonial	Galatasaray (Turkey)	2–1	Turkey	(Turkey) Ali Sami Yen Stadium, Istanbul
	Karan 31', 67'	(Report)	Metin 80'	Referee: (Turkey) Orhan Erdemir

1 September 2006 Friendly	Turkey	12–0	(Germany) Ingelheim	(Germany) Commerzbank Arena, Frankfurt
	Şükür 21', 39'; Arat 26'; Tekke 40'; Hamit Altıntop 41'; Kahveci 56', 79', 87'; Halil Altıntop 64', 70', 77'; Cimşir 80'	(Report)		Attendance: 0 Referee: (Germany) Helmut Fleischer

28 May 2007 Training	Turkey	1–0	Turkey U21	(Turkey) Florya Metin Oktay Facilities, Istanbul
	Unknown (og) 90'	(Report)
