= Turkey national football team results =

Below are the Turkey national football team all time results:

== Best / Worst Results ==
=== Best ===
As of 11 October 2025

Number	Year	Opponent	Result
GD +7
1	1949	Syria	7 – 0
2	1954	South Korea	7 – 0
3	1996	San Marino	7 – 0
GD +6
4	2005	Kazakhstan	6 – 0
5	2021	Gibraltar	6 – 0
GD +5
6	1950	Iran	6 – 1
7	2014	Kosovo	6 – 1
8	2025	Bulgaria	6 – 1
9	1994	Iceland	5 – 0
10	1997	San Marino	5 – 0
11	2001	Austria	5 – 0
12	2004	Liechtenstein	5 – 0
13	2006	Moldova	5 – 0
14	2013	Andorra	5 – 0
GD +4
15	1948	China	4 – 0
16	1957	Egypt	4 – 0
17	1969	Iran	4 – 0
18	1973	Algeria	4 – 0
19	1976	Malta	4 – 0
20	2004	Kazakhstan	4 – 0
21	2015	Bulgaria	4 – 0
22	2019	Moldova	4 – 0
23	2019	Moldova	4 – 0
GD +3
24	1967	Pakistan	7 – 4
25	1973	Bulgaria	5 – 2
26	2005	Georgia	5 – 2
27–31		5 Times	4 – 1
32–56		25 Times	3 – 0
GD +2
57	1997	Wales	6 – 4
58–64		7 Times	4 – 2
65–80		16 Times	3 – 1
81–117		38 Times	2 – 0

=== Worst ===
As of 11 October 2025

Number	Year	Opponent	Result
GD −8
1	1964	Poland	0 – 8
2	1984	England	0 – 8
3	1987	England	0 – 8
GD −6
4	1928	Egypt	1 – 7
5	1962	Italy	0 – 6
6	1965	Czechoslovakia	0 – 6
7	1984	Hungary	0 – 6
8	2025	Spain	0 – 6
GD −5
9	1954	West Germany	2 – 7
10	1926	Poland	1 – 6
11	2021	Netherlands	1 – 6
12	2024	Austria	1 – 6
13	1975	West Germany	0 – 5
14	1982	Hungary	0 – 5
15	1985	England	0 – 5
16	1990	Republic of Ireland	0 – 5
GD −4
17	1950	Israel	1 – 5
18	1952	Switzerland	1 – 5
19	1954	Yugoslavia	1 – 5
20	1965	Portugal	1 – 5
21	1974	Bulgaria	1 – 5
22	1983	West Germany	1 – 5
23	1991	Iceland	1 – 5
24–36		14 Times	0 – 4
GD −3
37	1924	Czech Republic	2 – 5
38–45		8 Times	1 – 4
46–66		21 Times	0 – 3
GD −2
67–68		2 Times	2 – 4
69–93		25 Times	1 – 3
94–125		32 Times	0 – 2

== Medals ==
Event	Gold	Silver	Bronze	Total
FIFA World Cup	0	0	1	1
UEFA European Championship	0	0	1	1
FIFA Confederations Cup	0	0	1	1
Mediterranean Games	0	3	2	5
Mediterranean Cup	0	1	0	1
ECO Cup	3	2	0	5
Balkan Cup	0	1	0	1
Total	3	7	5	15

Also reach to medal in 1980 Islamic Games and HKSAR Reunification Cup.

== Main results ==
As of 28 September 2026

Tournament	M	W	D	L	GF	GA	GD	Points
FIFA World Cup	13	6	1	6	23	22	+1	19
FIFA World Cup qualification	146	59	27	60	221	216	+5	204
FIFA Confederations Cup	5	2	1	2	8	8	0	7
UEFA European Championship	23	7	2	14	22	38	−16	23
UEFA European Championship Qualification	121	51	30	40	153	153	0	183
UEFA Nations League	26	11	6	9	44	32	12	39
Olympic games	4	1	0	3	8	15	–7	3
Mediterranean Cup	3	2	0	1	7	6	+1	6
Minor tournaments	10	6	3	1	24	14	+10	21
International friendlies	284	106	76	102	368	409	–41	396
Total	652	262	151	237	897	912	–15	897

== Minor results ==
- Football at the Summer Olympics
- Football at the Islamic Solidarity Games
- Islamic Games
- Mediterranean Games
- Mediterranean Cup
- Balkan Cup
- ECO Cup
- HKSAR Reunification Cup
- Turkey national football B team
- Friendly

== Results by decades ==
As of 2 October 2026

Year	M	W	D	L	GF	GA	GD
1920s	17	5	2	10	30	47	–17
1930s	8	1	1	6	11	24	–13
1940s	10	6	0	3	24	13	+11
1950s	37	13	10	14	54	64	–10
1960s	55	17	12	26	59	97	–38
1970s	55	14	15	26	58	88	–30
1980s	63	16	10	37	53	119	–66
1990s	82	31	24	27	106	102	+4
2000s	128	57	37	34	195	138	+57
2010s	110	56	23	32	158	109	+49
2020s	79	39	16	24	144	117	+27
Total	648	259	151	238	915	934	–19

== Results by year ==
As of 2 October 2026

=== 2020s ===
Year	M	W	D	L	GF	GA	GD
2020	8	1	5	2	12	14	−2
2021	16	8	4	4	32	25	+7
2022	10	6	1	3	25	13	+12
2023	10	6	2	2	19	13	+6
2024	15	6	3	6	19	23	−4
2025	10	7	1	2	25	15	+10
2026	10	5	0	5	12	14	–2
Total	79	39	16	24	144	117	+27

== See also ==
- Turkey national football team head to head
- Turkey women's national football team results
- Turkish football clubs in European competitions
- Turkey national under-21 football team
- Turkey national under-19 football team
- Turkey national under-17 football team
- Turkey women's national under-21 football team
- Turkey women's national under-19 football team
- Turkey women's national under-17 football team
