= 1990 FIFA World Cup qualification (UEFA) =

Tournament details
- Teams: 32 (from 1 confederation)

Tournament statistics
- Top scorer: (Belgium) Marc Van Der Linden (7 goals)

The European (UEFA) zone of qualification for the 1990 FIFA World Cup saw 32 teams competing for 13 places at the finals. UEFA members Italy qualified automatically as hosts of the finals. The qualification process started on 21 May 1988 and ended on 18 November 1989.

== Format ==
Teams were drawn into seven groups, four groups of five teams and three of four teams. All seven group-winners qualified automatically, with the runners-up in the four groups containing five teams (Groups 3, 5, 6 and 7) also qualifying. The two best second-placed teams in the three groups containing only four teams also qualified (Groups 1, 2 and 4), and the second-placed team with the worst record was eliminated.

== Draw ==
The draw for the qualifying groups took place in Zürich, Switzerland on 12 December 1987. During the draw teams were drawn from the 5 pots into the 7 groups. The seedings below were announced ten days before the draw. Teams qualified to the final tournament are in bold. The seeded teams were the 5 European sides who reached the 1986 Quarter Finals plus the Soviet Union and Denmark.

Pot A	Pot B	Pot C	Pot D	Pot E
**West Germany**; **England**; **Spain**; **Soviet Union**; Denmark; **Belgium**; France	Bulgaria; **Netherlands**; Poland; East Germany; Portugal; **Scotland**; Hungary	**Romania**; **Sweden**; Wales; Northern Ireland; **Austria**; **Czechoslovakia**; **Yugoslavia**	**Republic of Ireland**; Greece; Switzerland; Finland; Iceland; Norway; Albania	Turkey; Malta; Luxembourg; Cyprus

=== Summary ===
Group winners and runners up from groups of five qualified directly for 1990 FIFA World Cup. The two best runners-up from groups of four also qualified directly
Other teams were eliminated

Group 1	Group 2	Group 3	Group 4	Group 5	Group 6	Group 7
Romania	Sweden	Soviet Union	Netherlands	Yugoslavia	Spain	Belgium
Denmark	England	Austria	West Germany	Scotland	Republic of Ireland	Czechoslovakia
Greece Bulgaria	Poland Albania	Turkey East Germany Iceland	Finland Wales	France Norway Cyprus	Hungary Northern Ireland Malta	Portugal Switzerland Luxembourg

== Results ==
=== Group 1 ===
Pos	Team	Pld	W	D	L	GF	GA	GD	Pts	Qualification	Romania national football team	Denmark national football team	Greece national football team	Bulgaria national football team
1	Romania	6	4	1	1	10	5	+5	9	Qualification to 1990 FIFA World Cup	—	3–1	3–0	1–0
2	Denmark	6	3	2	1	15	6	+9	8		3–0	—	7–1	1–1
3	Greece	6	1	2	3	3	15	−12	4		0–0	1–1	—	1–0
4	Bulgaria	6	1	1	4	6	8	−2	3		1–3	0–2	4–0	—

=== Group 2 ===
Pos	Team	Pld	W	D	L	GF	GA	GD	Pts	Qualification	Sweden men's national football team	England national football team	Poland national football team	Albania national football team
1	Sweden	6	4	2	0	9	3	+6	10	Qualification to 1990 FIFA World Cup	—	0–0	2–1	3–1
2	England	6	3	3	0	10	0	+10	9	Qualification to 1990 FIFA World Cup	0–0	—	3–0	5–0
3	Poland	6	2	1	3	4	8	−4	5		0–2	0–0	—	1–0
4	Albania	6	0	0	6	3	15	−12	0		1–2	0–2	1–2	—

=== Group 3 ===
Pos	Team	Pld	W	D	L	GF	GA	GD	Pts	Qualification	Soviet Union national football team	Austria national football team	Turkey national football team	East Germany national football team	Iceland national football team
1	Soviet Union	8	4	3	1	11	4	+7	11	Qualification to 1990 FIFA World Cup	—	2–0	2–0	3–0	1–1
2	Austria	8	3	3	2	9	9	0	9	Qualification to 1990 FIFA World Cup	0–0	—	3–2	3–0	2–1
3	Turkey	8	3	1	4	12	10	+2	7		0–1	3–0	—	3–1	1–1
4	East Germany	8	3	1	4	9	13	−4	7		2–1	1–1	0–2	—	2–0
5	Iceland	8	1	4	3	6	11	−5	6		1–1	0–0	2–1	0–3	—

=== Group 4 ===
Pos	Team	Pld	W	D	L	GF	GA	GD	Pts	Qualification	Netherlands national football team	Germany national football team	Finland national football team	Wales national football team
1	Netherlands	6	4	2	0	8	2	+6	10	Qualification to 1990 FIFA World Cup	—	1–1	3–0	1–0
2	West Germany	6	3	3	0	13	3	+10	9	Qualification to 1990 FIFA World Cup	0–0	—	6–1	2–1
3	Finland	6	1	1	4	4	16	−12	3		0–1	0–4	—	1–0
4	Wales	6	0	2	4	4	8	−4	2		1–2	0–0	2–2	—

=== Group 5 ===
Pos	Team	Pld	W	D	L	GF	GA	GD	Pts	Qualification	Yugoslavia national football team	Scotland national football team	France national football team	Norway national football team	Cyprus national football team
1	Yugoslavia	8	6	2	0	16	6	+10	14	Qualification to 1990 FIFA World Cup	—	3–1	3–2	1–0	4–0
2	Scotland	8	4	2	2	12	12	0	10	Qualification to 1990 FIFA World Cup	1–1	—	2–0	1–1	2–1
3	France	8	3	3	2	10	7	+3	9		0–0	3–0	—	1–0	2–0
4	Norway	8	2	2	4	10	9	+1	6		1–2	1–2	1–1	—	3–1
5	Cyprus	8	0	1	7	6	20	−14	1		1–2	2–3	1–1	0–3	—

=== Group 6 ===
Pos	Team	Pld	W	D	L	GF	GA	GD	Pts	Qualification	Spain national football team	Republic of Ireland national football team	Hungary national football team	Northern Ireland national football team	Malta national football team
1	Spain	8	6	1	1	20	3	+17	13	Qualification to 1990 FIFA World Cup	—	2–0	4–0	4–0	4–0
2	Republic of Ireland	8	5	2	1	10	2	+8	12	Qualification to 1990 FIFA World Cup	1–0	—	2–0	3–0	2–0
3	Hungary	8	2	4	2	8	12	−4	8		2–2	0–0	—	1–0	1–1
4	Northern Ireland	8	2	1	5	6	12	−6	5		0–2	0–0	1–2	—	3–0
5	Malta	8	0	2	6	3	18	−15	2		0–2	0–2	2–2	0–2	—

=== Group 7 ===
Pos	Team	Pld	W	D	L	GF	GA	GD	Pts	Qualification	Belgium national football team	Czechoslovakia national football team	Portugal national football team	Switzerland national football team	Luxembourg national football team
1	Belgium	8	4	4	0	15	5	+10	12	Qualification to 1990 FIFA World Cup	—	2–1	3–0	1–0	1–1
2	Czechoslovakia	8	5	2	1	13	3	+10	12	Qualification to 1990 FIFA World Cup	0–0	—	2–1	3–0	4–0
3	Portugal	8	4	2	2	11	8	+3	10		1–1	0–0	—	3–1	1–0
4	Switzerland	8	2	1	5	10	14	−4	5		2–2	0–1	1–2	—	2–1
5	Luxembourg	8	0	1	7	3	22	−19	1		0–5	0–2	0–3	1–4	—

=== Ranking of second-placed teams from groups of four ===
Team	Pld	W	D	L	GF	GA	GD	Pts
West Germany	6	3	3	0	13	3	+10	9
England	6	3	3	0	10	0	+10	9
Denmark	6	3	2	1	15	6	+9	8

== Goalscorers ==
7 goals

- (Belgium) Marc Van Der Linden

6 goals

- (Scotland) Mo Johnston

5 goals

- (Austria) Toni Polster
- (Denmark) Flemming Povlsen
- (Spain) Manolo
- (Spain) Míchel
- (Switzerland) Kubilay Türkyilmaz
- (Turkey) Tanju Çolak

4 goals

- (Czechoslovakia) Michal Bílek
- (Czechoslovakia) Tomáš Skuhravý
- (East Germany) Andreas Thom
- (Portugal) Rui Águas
- (West Germany) Rudi Völler

3 goals

- (Belgium) Marc Degryse
- (Denmark) Brian Laudrup
- (Malta) Carmel Busuttil
- (Norway) Gøran Sørloth
- (Soviet Union) Hennadiy Lytovchenko
- (Soviet Union) Oleh Protasov
- (Spain) Emilio Butragueño
- (Turkey) Rıdvan Dilmen
- (Turkey) Feyyaz Uçar
- (Socialist Federal Republic of Yugoslavia) Dejan Savićević

2 goals

- (Albania) Sokol Kushta
- (Austria) Andreas Herzog
- (Belgium) Patrick Vervoort
- (Cyprus) Christos Kolliandris
- (Cyprus) Pambos Pittas
- (Denmark) Kent Nielsen
- (East Germany) Matthias Sammer
- (England) John Barnes
- (England) Peter Beardsley
- (England) Gary Lineker
- (Finland) Mika Lipponen
- (France) Didier Deschamps
- (France) Jean-Pierre Papin
- (Hungary) Attila Pintér
- (Hungary) István Vincze
- (Iceland) Pétur Pétursson
- (Republic of Ireland) John Aldridge
- (Republic of Ireland) Tony Cascarino
- (Republic of Ireland) Ray Houghton
- (Netherlands) John Bosman
- (Northern Ireland) Colin Clarke
- (Norway) Rune Bratseth
- (Norway) Jan Åge Fjørtoft
- (Norway) Kjetil Osvold
- (Poland) Ryszard Tarasiewicz
- (Portugal) Vítor Paneira
- (Romania) Gavril Balint
- (Romania) Rodion Cămătaru
- (Romania) Dorin Mateuţ
- (Romania) Ioan Sabău
- (Scotland) Ally McCoist
- (Scotland) Richard Gough
- (Soviet Union) Igor Dobrovolski
- (Soviet Union) Oleksiy Mykhaylychenko
- (Sweden) Johnny Ekström
- (West Germany) Lothar Matthäus
- (West Germany) Andreas Möller
- (West Germany) Karl-Heinz Riedle
- (Socialist Federal Republic of Yugoslavia) Faruk Hadžibegić
- (Socialist Federal Republic of Yugoslavia) Srečko Katanec
- (Socialist Federal Republic of Yugoslavia) Dragan Stojković
- (Socialist Federal Republic of Yugoslavia) Zlatko Vujović

1 goal

- (Albania) Ylli Shehu
- (Austria) Heimo Pfeifenberger
- (Austria) Manfred Zsak
- (Belgium) Jan Ceulemans
- (Belgium) Bruno Versavel
- (Bulgaria) Kalin Bankov
- (Bulgaria) Bozhidar Iskrenov
- (Bulgaria) Trifon Ivanov
- (Bulgaria) Hristo Kolev
- (Bulgaria) Anyo Sadkov
- (Bulgaria) Hristo Stoichkov
- (Cyprus) Yiannos Ioannou
- (Cyprus) Floros Nicolaou
- (Czechoslovakia) Jozef Chovanec
- (Czechoslovakia) Stanislav Griga
- (Czechoslovakia) Ivan Hašek
- (Czechoslovakia) Milan Luhový
- (Czechoslovakia) Ľubomír Moravčík
- (Denmark) Henrik Andersen
- (Denmark) Jan Bartram
- (Denmark) Lars Elstrup
- (Denmark) Michael Laudrup
- (Denmark) Kim Vilfort
- (East Germany) Thomas Doll
- (East Germany) Rainer Ernst
- (East Germany) Ulf Kirsten
- (England) Paul Gascoigne
- (England) Bryan Robson
- (England) Chris Waddle
- (England) Neil Webb
- (Finland) Mixu Paatelainen
- (Finland) Kari Ukkonen
- (France) Laurent Blanc
- (France) Eric Cantona
- (France) Jean-Philippe Durand
- (France) Christian Perez
- (France) Franck Sauzée
- (France) Daniel Xuereb
- (Greece) Kostas Mavridis
- (Greece) Tasos Mitropoulos
- (Greece) Nikos Nioplias
- (Hungary) Imre Boda
- (Hungary) György Bognár
- (Hungary) József Kiprich
- (Hungary) Kálmán Kovács
- (Iceland) Atli Eðvaldsson
- (Iceland) Sigurður Grétarsson
- (Iceland) Ragnar Margeirsson
- (Iceland) Guðmundur Torfason
- (Republic of Ireland) Paul McGrath
- (Republic of Ireland) Kevin Moran
- (Republic of Ireland) Ronnie Whelan
- (Luxembourg) Guy Hellers
- (Luxembourg) Robby Langers
- (Luxembourg) Théo Malget
- (Netherlands) Ruud Gullit
- (Netherlands) Wim Kieft
- (Netherlands) Erwin Koeman
- (Netherlands) Ronald Koeman
- (Netherlands) Graeme Rutjes
- (Netherlands) Marco van Basten
- (Northern Ireland) Michael O'Neill
- (Northern Ireland) Steve Penney
- (Northern Ireland) Jimmy Quinn
- (Northern Ireland) Norman Whiteside
- (Norway) Erland Johnsen
- (Poland) Krzysztof Warzycha
- (Poland) Jacek Ziober
- (Portugal) Rui Barros
- (Portugal) Paulo Futre
- (Portugal) Fernando Gomes
- (Portugal) João Pinto
- (Portugal) Frederico Rosa
- (Romania) Gheorghe Hagi
- (Romania) Gheorghe Popescu
- (Scotland) Gordon Durie
- (Scotland) Paul McStay
- (Soviet Union) Oleksandr Zavarov
- (Spain) Genar Andrinúa
- (Spain) Txiki Begiristain
- (Spain) Fernando
- (Spain) Juanito
- (Spain) Julio Salinas
- (Sweden) Leif Engqvist
- (Sweden) Hans Holmqvist
- (Sweden) Klas Ingesson
- (Sweden) Niclas Larsson
- (Sweden) Peter Larsson
- (Sweden) Roger Ljung
- (Sweden) Mats Magnusson
- (Switzerland) Christophe Bonvin
- (Switzerland) Adrian Knup
- (Switzerland) Alain Sutter
- (Switzerland) Beat Sutter
- (Switzerland) Dario Zuffi
- (Turkey) Oğuz Çetin
- (Wales) Malcolm Allen
- (Wales) Mark Bowen
- (Wales) Dean Saunders
- (West Germany) Thomas Häßler
- (West Germany) Jürgen Klinsmann
- (West Germany) Pierre Littbarski
- (Socialist Federal Republic of Yugoslavia) Darko Pančev
- (Socialist Federal Republic of Yugoslavia) Predrag Spasić
- (Socialist Federal Republic of Yugoslavia) Vujadin Stanojković
- (Socialist Federal Republic of Yugoslavia) Safet Sušić

1 own goal

- (Northern Ireland) Alan McDonald (playing against Spain)
- (Northern Ireland) Anton Rogan (playing against Spain)
- (Scotland) Gary Gillespie (playing against Yugoslavia)
- (Spain) Míchel (playing against Ireland)
- (Switzerland) Alain Geiger (playing against Belgium)
