= England national football team results (1980–1999) =

- Win Draw Loss Void

This is a list of the England national football team results from 1980 to 1999 (Matches 537 – 764).

== 1980s ==
=== 1980 ===
6 February UEFA Euro 1980 qualifying Group 1	England	2 – 0	Republic of Ireland	London, England
19:45 GMT (UTC); Match 537	Keegan 34', 74'	Report; UEFA Report		Stadium: Wembley; Attendance: 90,299; Referee: Klaus Scheurell (East Germany)

26 March International Friendly	Spain	0 – 2	England	Barcelona, Spain
Match 538		Report	Woodcock 16'; Francis 65'	Stadium: Camp Nou; Attendance: 50,000; Referee: Volker Roth (West Germany)

13 May International Friendly	England	3 – 1	Argentina	London, England
Match 539	Johnson 41', 50'; Keegan 68'	Report	Passarella 53' (pen.)	Stadium: Wembley; Attendance: 92,000; Referee: Brian McGinlay (Scotland)

17 May Home Championship	Wales	4 – 1	England	Wrexham, Wales
Match 540	Thomas 19'; Walsh 30'; James 60'; Thompson 66' (o.g.)	Report	Mariner 16'	Stadium: Racecourse Ground; Attendance: 24,358; Referee: Ian Foote (Scotland)

20 May Home Championship	England	1 – 1	Northern Ireland	London, England
Match 541	Johnson 81'	Report	Cochrane 83'	Stadium: Wembley; Attendance: 33,676; Referee: Gwyn Owen (Wales)

24 May Home Championship	Scotland	0 – 2	England	Glasgow, Scotland
Match 542		Report	Brooking 8'; Coppell 75'	Stadium: Hampden Park; Attendance: 85,500; Referee: António Garrido (Portugal)

31 May International Friendly	Australia	1 – 2	England	Sydney, Australia
Match 543	Cole 88' (pen.)	Report	Hoddle 10'; Mariner 25'	Stadium: Sydney Cricket Ground; Attendance: 45,000; Referee: Tony Boskovic (Australia)

12 June UEFA Euro 1980 Group 2	Belgium	1 – 1	England	Turin, Italy
17:45 CEST (UTC+02); Match 544	Ceulemans 29'	Report; UEFA Report	Wilkins 26'	Stadium: Stadio Comunale; Attendance: 15,186; Referee: Heinz Aldinger (Germany)

15 June UEFA Euro 1980 Group 2	England	0 – 1	Italy	Turin, Italy
20:30 CEST (UTC+02); Match 545		Report; UEFA Report	Tardelli 79'	Stadium: Stadio Comunale; Attendance: 59,649; Referee: Nicolae Rainea (Romania)

18 June UEFA Euro 1980 Group 2	Spain	1 – 2	England	Naples, Italy
17:45 CEST (UTC+02); Match 546	Dani 48' (pen.)	Report; UEFA Report	Brooking 19'; Woodcock 61'	Stadium: Stadio San Paolo; Attendance: 14,000; Referee: Erich Linemayr (Austria)

10 September 1982 FIFA World Cup qualification Group 4	England	4 – 0	Norway	London, England
Match 547	McDermott 37', 75' (pen.); Woodcock 66'; Mariner 85'	Report		Stadium: Wembley; Attendance: 48,200; Referee: Marcel van Langenhove (Belgium)

15 October 1982 FIFA World Cup qualification Group 4	Romania	2 – 1	England	Bucharest, Romania
Match 548	Răducanu 35'; Iordănescu 75'	Report	Woodcock 64'	Stadium: Stadionul 23. August; Attendance: 80,000; Referee: Ulf Eriksson (Sweden)

19 November 1982 FIFA World Cup qualification Group 4	England	2 – 1	Switzerland	London, England
Match 549	Tanner 22' (o.g.); Mariner 36'	Report	Pfister 76'	Stadium: Wembley; Attendance: 70,000; Referee: Jan Keizer (Netherlands)

=== 1981 ===
25 March International Friendly	England	1 – 2	Spain	London, England
Match 550	Hoddle 26'	Report	Satrústegui 6'; Zamora 32'	Stadium: Wembley; Attendance: 71,840; Referee: Walter Eschweiler (West Germany)

29 April 1982 FIFA World Cup qualification Group 4	England	0 – 0	Romania	London, England
Match 551		Report		Stadium: Wembley; Attendance: 62,500; Referee: Alexis Ponnet (Belgium)

12 May International Friendly	England	0 – 1	Brazil	London, England
Match 552		Report	Zico 11'	Stadium: Wembley; Attendance: 75,000; Referee: Erich Linemayr (Austria)

20 May Home Championship	England	0 – 0	Wales	London, England
Match 553		Report		Stadium: Wembley; Attendance: 34,280; Referee: Brian McGinlay (Scotland)

23 May Home Championship	England	0 – 1	Scotland	London, England
Match 554		Report	Robertson 64' (pen.)	Stadium: Wembley; Attendance: 90,000; Referee: Robert Wurtz (France)

30 May 1982 FIFA World Cup qualification Group 4	Switzerland	2 – 1	England	Basel, Switzerland
Match 555	Scheiwiler 28'; Sulser 30'	Report	McDermott 54'	Stadium: St. Jakob Stadium; Attendance: 40,000; Referee: Adolf Prokop (East Germany)

6 June 1982 FIFA World Cup qualification Group 4	Hungary	1 – 3	England	Budapest, Hungary
Match 556	Garaba 44'	Report	Brooking 19', 60'; Keegan 73' (pen.)	Stadium: Népstadion; Attendance: 65,000; Referee: Paolo Casarin (Italy)

9 September 1982 FIFA World Cup qualification Group 4	Norway	2 – 1	England	Oslo, Norway
Match 557	Albertsen 35'; Thoresen 41'	Report	Robson 15'	Stadium: Ullevaal Stadion; Attendance: 28,500; Referee: Jerzy Kacprzak (Poland)

18 November 1982 FIFA World Cup qualification Group 4	England	1 – 0	Hungary	London, England
Match 558	Mariner 14'	Report		Stadium: Wembley; Attendance: 92,000; Referee: Georges Konrath (France)

=== 1982 ===
23 February Home Championship	England	4 – 0	Northern Ireland	London, England
Match 559	Robson 1' (44 secs); Keegan 56'; Wilkins 85'; Hoddle 89'	Report		Stadium: Wembley; Attendance: 54,900; Referee: Gwyn Owen (Wales)

27 April Home Championship	Wales	0 – 1	England	Cardiff, Wales
Match 560		Report	Francis 74'	Stadium: Ninian Park; Attendance: 25,000; Referee: Oliver Donnelly (Northern Ireland)

25 May International Friendly	England	2 – 0	Netherlands	London, England
Match 561	Woodcock 48'; Mariner 53'	Report		Stadium: Wembley; Attendance: 69,000; Referee: Paolo Bergamo (Italy)

29 May Home Championship	Scotland	0 – 1	England	Glasgow, Scotland
Match 562		Report	Mariner 13'	Stadium: Hampden Park; Attendance: 80,529; Referee: Jan Redelfs (West Germany)

2 June International Friendly	Iceland	1 – 1	England	Reykjavík, Iceland
Match 563	Arnór 23'	Report	Goddard 69'	Stadium: Laugardalsvöllur; Attendance: 10,814; Referee: Ib Nielsen (Denmark)

3 June International Friendly	Finland	1 – 4	England	Helsinki, Finland
Match 564	Haaskivi 83' (pen.)	Report	Mariner 13', 61'; Robson 27', 58'	Stadium: Olympiastadion; Attendance: 21,521; Referee: J Romualdas (Soviet Union)

16 June 1982 FIFA World Cup Group 4	England	3 – 1	France	Bilbao, Spain
17:15 CEST (UTC+02); Match 565	Robson 1', 67'; Mariner 83'	Report; FIFA Report	Soler 24'	Stadium: Estadio San Mamés; Attendance: 44,172; Referee: António Garrido (Portugal)

20 June 1982 FIFA World Cup Group 4	England	2 – 0	Czechoslovakia	Bilbao, Spain
17:15 CEST (UTC+02); Match 566	Francis 62'; Barmoš 66' (o.g.)	Report; FIFA Report		Stadium: Estadio San Mamés; Attendance: 41,123; Referee: Charles Corver (Netherlands)

25 June 1982 FIFA World Cup Group 4	England	1 – 0	Kuwait	Bilbao, Spain
17:15 CEST (UTC+02); Match 567	Francis 27'	Report; FIFA Report		Stadium: Estadio San Mamés; Attendance: 39,700; Referee: Gilberto Aristizabal (Columbia)

29 June 1982 FIFA World Cup Second round Group 2	West Germany	0 – 0	England	Madrid, Spain
21:00 CEST (UTC+02); Match 568		Report; FIFA Report		Stadium: Estadio Santiago Bernabéu; Attendance: 75,000; Referee: Arnaldo Cézar Coelho (Brazil)

5 July 1982 FIFA World Cup Second round Group 2	Spain	0 – 0	England	Madrid, Spain
21:00 CEST (UTC+02); Match 569		Report; FIFA Report		Stadium: Estadio Santiago Bernabéu; Attendance: 75,000; Referee: Alexis Ponnet (Belgium)

22 September UEFA Euro 1984 qualifying Group 3	Denmark	2 – 2	England	Copenhagen, Denmark
19:00 CEST (UTC+02); Match 570	Hansen 68' (pen.); Olsen 89'	Report; UEFA Report	Francis 8', 82'	Stadium: Parken Stadium; Attendance: 44,300; Referee: Charles Corver (Netherlands)

13 October International Friendly	England	1 – 2	West Germany	London, England
Match 571	Woodcock 85'	Report	Rummenigge 73', 83'	Stadium: Wembley; Attendance: 68,000; Referee: Karoly Pálotai (Hungary)

17 November UEFA Euro 1984 qualifying Group 3	Greece	0 – 3	England	Thessaloniki, Greece
14:00 EET (UTC+02); Match 572		Report; UEFA Report	Woodcock 1', 64'; Lee 68'	Stadium: Kaftanzoglio Stadium; Attendance: 41,554; Referee: Adolf Prokop (East Germany)

15 December UEFA Euro 1984 qualifying Group 3	England	9 – 0	Luxembourg	London, England
19:45 GMT (UTC); Match 573	Bossi 18' (o.g.); Coppell 22'; Woodcock 34'; Blissett 44', 62', 86'; Chamberlain 71'; Hoddle 87'; Neal 89'	Report; UEFA Report		Stadium: Wembley; Attendance: 33,980; Referee: Hreidar Jonsson (Iceland)

=== 1983 ===
23 February Home Championship	England	2 – 1	Wales	London, England
Match 574	Butcher 39'; Neal 78' (pen.)	Report	Rush 14'	Stadium: Wembley; Attendance: 24,000; Referee: Bob Valentine (Scotland)

30 March UEFA Euro 1984 qualifying Group 3	England	0 – 0	Greece	London, England
19:45 BST (UTC+01); Match 575		Report; UEFA Report		Stadium: Wembley; Attendance: 48,500; Referee: Dusan Krisznak (Czechoslovakia)

27 April UEFA Euro 1984 qualifying Group 3	England	2 – 0	Hungary	London, England
19:45 BST (UTC+01); Match 576	Francis 31'; Withe 70'	Report; UEFA Report		Stadium: Wembley; Attendance: 55,000; Referee: Pietro D'Elia (Italy)

28 May Home Championship	Northern Ireland	0 – 0	England	Belfast, Northern Ireland
Match 577		Report		Stadium: Windsor Park; Attendance: 22,000; Referee: Howard King (Wales)

1 June Home Championship	England	2 – 0	Scotland	London, England
Match 578	Robson 12'; Cowans 52'	Report		Stadium: Wembley; Attendance: 84,000; Referee: Erik Fredriksson (Sweden)

12 June International Friendly	Australia	0 – 0	England	Sydney, Australia
Match 579		Report		Stadium: Sydney Cricket Ground; Attendance: 28,000; Referee: Tony Boskovic (Australia)

15 June International Friendly	Australia	0 – 1	England	Brisbane, Australia
Match 580		Report	Walsh 57'	Stadium: Lang Park; Attendance: 16,000; Referee: Peter Rampley (Australia)

19 June International Friendly	Australia	1 – 1	England	Melbourne, Australia
Match 581	Neal 27' (o.g.)	Report	Francis 25'	Stadium: Olympic Park; Attendance: 20,000; Referee: Jack Johnston (Australia)

21 September UEFA Euro 1984 qualifying Group 3	England	0 – 1	Denmark	London, England
19:45 BST (UTC+01); Match 582		Report; UEFA Report	Simonsen 36' (pen.)	Stadium: Wembley; Attendance: 82,500; Referee: Alexis Ponnet (Belgium)

12 October UEFA Euro 1984 qualifying Group 3	Hungary	0 – 3	England	Budapest, Hungary
18:00 CEST (UTC+02); Match 583		Report; UEFA Report	Hoddle 13'; Lee 19'; Mariner 42'	Stadium: Puskás Ferenc; Attendance: 25,000; Referee: Bruno Galler (Switzerland)

16 November UEFA Euro 1984 qualifying Group 3	Luxembourg	0 – 4	England	Luxembourg City, Luxembourg
19:15 CET (UTC+01); Match 584		Report; UEFA Report	Robson 10', 56'; Mariner 38'; Butcher 50'	Stadium: Josy Barthel; Attendance: 5,400; Referee: Cornelius (Cees) Bakker (Netherlands)

=== 1984 ===
29 February International Friendly	France	2 – 0	England	Paris, France
Match 585	Platini 58', 71'	Report		Stadium: Parc des Princes; Attendance: 43,000; Referee: Marcel van Langenhove (Belgium)

4 April Home Championship	England	1 – 0	Northern Ireland	London, England
Match 586	Woodcock 49'	Report		Stadium: Wembley; Attendance: 24,000; Referee: Ron Bridges (Wales)

2 May Home Championship	Wales	1 – 0	England	Wrexham, Wales
Match 587	Hughes 17	Report		Stadium: Racecourse Ground; Attendance: 14,250; Referee: David Syme (Scotland)

29 May Home Championship	Scotland	1 – 1	England	Glasgow, Scotland
Match 588	McGhee 13'	Report	Woodcock 36'	Stadium: Hampden Park; Attendance: 73,064; Referee: Paolo Casarin (Italy)

2 June International Friendly	England	0 – 2	Soviet Union	London, England
Match 589		Report	Gotsmanov 54'; Protasov 89'	Stadium: Wembley; Attendance: 38,125; Referee: Michel Vautrot (France)

10 June American tour (Friendly)	Brazil	0 – 2	England	Rio de Janeiro, Brazil
Match 590		Report	Barnes 43'; Hateley 65'	Stadium: Estádio do Maracanã; Attendance: 56,126; Referee: Juan Cardelino (Chile)

13 June American tour (Friendly)	Uruguay	2 – 0	England	Montevideo, Uruguay
Match 591	Acosta 7' (pen.); Cabrera 69'	Report		Stadium: Centenario Stadium; Attendance: 34,500; Referee: Lucio Gonzales (Paraguay)

17 June American tour (Friendly)	Chile	0 – 0	England	Santiago, Chile
Match 592		Report		Stadium: Estadio Nacional; Attendance: 10,000; Referee: Luis Felix (Brazil)

12 September International Friendly	England	1 – 0	East Germany	London, England
Match 593	Robson 82'	Report		Stadium: Wembley; Attendance: 23,951; Referee: Albert Thomas (Netherlands)

17 October 1986 FIFA World Cup qualification Group 3	England	5 – 0	Finland	London, England
Match 594	Hateley 29', 49'; Woodcock 40'; Robson 71'; Sansom 85'	Report		Stadium: Wembley; Attendance: 47,234; Referee: Aleksander Suchanek (Poland)

14 November 1986 FIFA World Cup qualification Group 3	Turkey	0 – 8	England	Istanbul, Turkey
Match 595		Report	Robson 13', 17', 59'; Woodcock 44', 61'; Barnes 47', 53'; Anderson 86'	Stadium: Beşiktaş İnönü; Attendance: 26,494; Referee: Vojtech Christov (Czechoslovakia)

=== 1985 ===
27 February 1986 FIFA World Cup qualification Group 3	Northern Ireland	0 – 1	England	Belfast, Northern Ireland
Match 596		Report	Hateley 77'	Stadium: Windsor Park; Attendance: 28,000; Referee: Volker Roth (West Germany)

26 March International Friendly	England	2 – 1	Republic of Ireland	London, England
Match 597	Steven 45'; Lineker 76'	Report	Brady 88'	Stadium: Wembley; Attendance: 34,793; Referee: George Smith (Scotland)

1 May 1986 FIFA World Cup qualification Group 3	Romania	0 – 0	England	Bucharest, Romania
Match 598		Report		Stadium: Stadionul 23 August; Attendance: 70,000; Referee: Emilio Guruceta (Spain)

22 May 1986 FIFA World Cup qualification Group 3	Finland	1 – 1	England	Helsinki, Finland
Match 599	Rantanen 5'	Report	Hateley 50'	Stadium: Olympiastadion; Attendance: 30,000; Referee: Siegfried Kirschen (East Germany)

25 May Rous Cup	Scotland	1 – 0	England	Glasgow, Scotland
Match 600	Gough 68'	Report		Stadium: Hampden Park; Attendance: 66,489; Referee: Michel Vautrot (France)

6 June Ciudad de México Cup	Italy	2 – 1	England	Mexico City, Mexico
Match 601	Bagni 73'; Altobelli 89' (pen.)	Report	Hateley 74'	Stadium: Estadio Azteca; Attendance: 7,000; Referee: Antonio Márquez Ramírez (Mexico)

9 June Ciudad de México Cup / Azteca 2000 Tournament	Mexico	1 – 0	England	Mexico City, Mexico
Match 602	Flores 20'	Report		Stadium: Estadio Azteca; Attendance: 15,000; Referee: Volker Roth (West Germany)

12 June Azteca 2000 Tournament	England	3 – 0	West Germany	Mexico City, Mexico
Match 603	Robson 34'; Dixon 54', 67'	Report		Stadium: Estadio Azteca; Attendance: 8,000; Referee: Jorge Leanza Sansone (Mexico)

16 June International Friendly	United States	0 – 5	England	Los Angeles, CA, United States
Match 604		Report	Lineker 13', 47'; Dixon 30', 73'; Steven 81'	Stadium: Memorial Coliseum; Attendance: 10,145; Referee: Edgardo Codesal Méndez (Mexico)

11 September 1986 FIFA World Cup qualification Group 3	England	1 – 1	Romania	London, England
Match 605	Hoddle 25'	Report	Cămătaru 65'	Stadium: Wembley; Attendance: 59,500; Referee: Karl-Heinz Tritschler (West Germany)

16 October 1986 FIFA World Cup qualification Group 3	England	5 – 0	Turkey	London, England
Match 606	Waddle 15'; Lineker 18', 42', 53'; Robson 35'	Report		Stadium: Wembley; Attendance: 52,500; Referee: Anatoly Milchenko (Soviet Union)

13 November 1986 FIFA World Cup qualification Group 3	England	0 – 0	Northern Ireland	London, England
Match 607		Report		Stadium: Wembley; Attendance: 70,500; Referee: Erik Fredriksson (Sweden)

=== 1986 ===
29 January International Friendly	Egypt	0 – 4	England	Cairo, Egypt
Match 608		Report	Steven 14'; Omar 41' (o.g.); Wallace 52'; Cowans 80'	Stadium: Nasser Stadium; Attendance: 20,000; Referee: Yasaras (Greece)

26 February International Friendly	Israel	1 – 2	England	Ramat Gan, Israel
Match 609	Ohana 7'	Report	Robson 51', 86' (pen.)	Stadium: Ramat Gan Stadium; Attendance: 30,000; Referee: Philippe Mercier (Switzerland)

26 March International Friendly	Soviet Union	0 – 1	England	Tbilisi, Georgia
Match 610		Report	Waddle 67'	Stadium: Dinamo Stadium; Attendance: 62,000; Referee: Velitchko Tzonchev (Bulgaria)

23 April Rous Cup	England	2 – 1	Scotland	London, England
Match 611	Butcher 27'; Hoddle 43'	Report	Souness 57' (pen.)	Stadium: Wembley; Attendance: 68,357; Referee: Michel Vautrot (France)

17 May International Friendly	England	3 – 0	Mexico	Los Angeles, CA, United States
Match 612	Hateley 22', 30'; Beardsley 37'	Report		Stadium: Memorial Coliseum; Attendance: 63,770; Referee: Vincent Mauro (United States)

24 May International Friendly	Canada	0 – 1	England	Burnaby, BC, Canada
Match 613		Report	Hateley 61'	Stadium: Swangard Stadium; Attendance: 8,150; Referee: John Meachin (Canada)

3 June 1986 FIFA World Cup Group F	Portugal	1 – 0	England	Monterrey, Mexico
16:00 CST (UTC−06); Match 614	Carlos Manuel 76'	Report		Stadium: Estadio Tecnológico; Attendance: 23,000; Referee: Volker Roth (West Germany)

6 June 1986 FIFA World Cup Group F	England	0 – 0	Morocco	Monterrey, Mexico
16:00 CST (UTC−06); Match 615	Wilkins (red card) 42'	Report		Stadium: Estadio Tecnológico; Attendance: 20,200; Referee: Gabriel González (Paraguay)

11 June 1986 FIFA World Cup Group F	England	3 – 0	Poland	Monterrey, Mexico
16:00 CST (UTC−06); Match 616	Lineker 9', 14', 34'	Report		Stadium: Estadio Tecnológico; Attendance: 23,000; Referee: André Daina (Switzerland)

18 June 1986 FIFA World Cup Round of 16	England	3 – 0	Paraguay	Mexico City, Mexico
12:00 CST (UTC−06); Match 617	Lineker 31', 73'; Beardsley 56'	Report		Stadium: Estadio Azteca; Attendance: 98,728; Referee: Jamal Al Sharif (Syria)

22 June 1986 FIFA World Cup Quarter-final	Argentina	2 – 1	England	Mexico City, Mexico
12:00 CST (UTC−06); Match 618	Maradona 51', 54'	Report	Lineker 80'	Stadium: Estadio Azteca; Attendance: 114,580; Referee: Ali Bennaceur (Tunisia)

10 September International Friendly	Sweden	1 – 0	England	Stockholm, Sweden
Match 619	Ekström 50'	Report		Stadium: Söderstadion; Attendance: 15,640; Referee: Werner Fockler (West Germany)

15 October UEFA Euro 1988 qualifying Group 4	England	3 – 0	Northern Ireland	London, England
19:45 BST (UTC+01); Match 620	Lineker 33', 80'; Waddle 75'	Report		Stadium: Wembley; Attendance: 35,300; Referee: Alphonse Costantin (Belgium)

12 November UEFA Euro 1988 qualifying Group 4	England	2 – 0	Yugoslavia	London, England
19:45 GMT (UTC); Match 621	Anderson 21'; Mabbutt 56'	Report		Stadium: Wembley; Attendance: 60,000; Referee: Franz Wöhrer (Austria)

=== 1987 ===
18 February International Friendly	Spain	2 – 4	England	Madrid, Spain
Match 622	Butragueño 14'; Vázquez 76'	Report	Lineker 24', 28', 47', 56'	Stadium: Santiago Bernabéu; Attendance: 35,000; Referee: Claudio Pieri (Italy)

1 April UEFA Euro 1988 qualifying Group 4	Northern Ireland	0 – 2	England	Belfast, Northern Ireland
20:00 BST (UTC+01); Match 623		Report	Hodge 19'; Waddle 43'	Stadium: Windsor Park; Attendance: 20,578; Referee: Emilio Soriano Aladrén (Spain)

29 April UEFA Euro 1988 qualifying Group 4	Turkey	0 – 0	England	İzmir, Turkey
Match 624		Report		Stadium: Alsancak Stadium; Attendance: 25,000; Referee: Valeri Butenko (Soviet Union)

19 May Rous Cup	England	1 – 1	Brazil	London, England
Match 625	Lineker 35'	Report	Mirandinha 36'	Stadium: Wembley; Attendance: 92,000; Referee: Michel Vautrot (France)

23 May Rous Cup	Scotland	0 – 0	England	Glasgow, Scotland
Match 626		Report		Stadium: Hampden Park; Attendance: 64,713; Referee: Dieter Pauly (West Germany)

9 September International Friendly	West Germany	3 – 1	England	Düsseldorf, West Germany
Match 627	Littbarski 24', 33'; Wuttke 84'	Report	Lineker 42'	Stadium: Rheinstadion; Attendance: 50,000; Referee: Paolo Casarin (Italy)

14 October UEFA Euro 1988 qualifying Group 4	England	8 – 0	Turkey	London, England
20:00 BST (UTC+01); Match 628	Barnes 2', 28'; Lineker 8', 43', 70'; Robson 59'; Beardsley 62'; Webb 88'	Report		Stadium: Wembley; Attendance: 45,528; Referee: Albert Thomas (Netherlands)

11 November UEFA Euro 1988 qualifying Group 4	Yugoslavia	1 – 4	England	Belgrade, Yugoslavia
16:30 CET (UTC+01); Match 629	Katanec 80'	Report	Beardsley 3'; Barnes 17'; Robson 20'; Adams 25'	Stadium: Stadion FK Partizan; Attendance: 70,000; Referee: Michel Vautrot (France)

=== 1988 ===
17 February International Friendly	Israel	0 – 0	England	Ramat Gan, Israel
Match 630		Report		Stadium: Ramat Gan Stadium; Attendance: 5,000; Referee: Alphonse Costantin (Belgium)

23 March International Friendly	England	2 – 2	Netherlands	London, England
Match 631	Lineker 13'; Adams 61'	Report	Adams 20' (o.g.); Bosman 25'	Stadium: Wembley; Attendance: 74,590; Referee: Adolf Prokop (East Germany)

27 April International Friendly	Hungary	0 – 0	England	Budapest, Hungary
Match 632		Report		Stadium: Népstadion; Attendance: 26,500; Referee: Karl-Heinz Tritschler (West Germany)

21 May Rous Cup	England	1 – 0	Scotland	London, England
Match 633	Beardsley 12'	Report		Stadium: Wembley; Attendance: 70,480; Referee: Joël Quiniou (France)

24 May Rous Cup	England	1 – 1	Colombia	London, England
Match 634	Lineker 22'	Report	Escobar 66'	Stadium: Wembley; Attendance: 25,756; Referee: Karl-Josef Assenmacher (West Germany)

28 May International Friendly	Switzerland	0 – 1	England	Lausanne, Switzerland
Match 635		Report	Lineker 60'	Stadium: Stade Olympique de la Pontaise; Attendance: 10,000; Referee: Luigi Agnolin (Italy)

12 June UEFA Euro 1988 Group 2	England	0 – 1	Republic of Ireland	Stuttgart, West Germany
15:30 CEST (UTC+02:00); Match 636		Report	Houghton 6'	Stadium: VfB Arena; Attendance: 55,500; Referee: Siegfried Kirschen (East Germany)

15 June UEFA Euro 1988 Group 2	England	1 – 3	Netherlands	Düsseldorf, West Germany
17:15 CEST (UTC+02:00); Match 637	Robson 53'	Report	van Basten 44', 71', 75'	Stadium: Rheinstadion; Attendance: 68,400; Referee: Paolo Casarin (Italy)

18 June UEFA Euro 1988 Group 2	England	1 – 3	Soviet Union	Frankfurt, West Germany
15:30 CEST (UTC+02:00); Match 638	Adams 16'	Report	Aleinikov 3'; Mykhaylychenko 28'; Pasulko 73'	Stadium: Waldstadion; Attendance: 53,000; Referee: José Rosa dos Santos (Portugal)

14 September International Friendly	England	1 – 0	Denmark	London, England
Match 639	Webb 29'	Report		Stadium: Wembley; Attendance: 25,837; Referee: Alexis Ponnet (Belgium)

19 October 1990 FIFA World Cup qualification Group 2	England	0 – 0	Sweden	London, England
Match 640		Report		Stadium: Wembley; Attendance: 65,628; Referee: Gérard Biguet (France)

16 November International Friendly	Saudi Arabia	1 – 1	England	Riyadh, Saudi Arabia
Match 641	Abdullah 15'	Report	Adams 54'	Stadium: King Fahd International Stadium; Attendance: 8,000; Referee: Jassim Abdul-Rahman Mandi (Bahrain)

=== 1989 ===
8 February International Friendly	Greece	1 – 2	England	Athens, Greece
Match 642	Saravakos 1' (pen.)	Report	Barnes 7'; Robson 80'	Stadium: Olympiako Stadio; Attendance: 4,000; Referee: Heinz Holzmann (Austria)

8 March 1990 FIFA World Cup qualification Group 2	Albania	0 – 2	England	Tirana, Albania
Match 643		Report	Barnes 16'; Robson 63'	Stadium: Qemal Stafa; Attendance: 30,000; Referee: John Blankenstein (Netherlands)

26 April 1990 FIFA World Cup qualification Group 2	England	5 – 0	Albania	London, England
Match 644	Lineker 23'; Beardsley 12', 64'; Waddle 72'; Gascoigne 88'	Report		Stadium: Wembley; Attendance: 60,602; Referee: Einar Halle (Norway)

23 May Rous Cup	England	0 – 0	Chile	London, England
Match 645		Report		Stadium: Wembley; Attendance: 15,628; Referee: Erik Fredriksson (Sweden)

27 May Rous Cup	Scotland	0 – 2	England	Glasgow, Scotland
Match 646		Report	Waddle 20'; Bull 82'	Stadium: Hampden Park; Attendance: 63,282; Referee: Michel Vautrot (France)

3 June 1990 FIFA World Cup qualification Group 2	England	3 – 0	Poland	London, England
Match 647	Lineker 23'; Barnes 72'; Webb 83'	Report		Stadium: Wembley; Attendance: 69,203; Referee: Luigi Agnolin (Italy)

7 June International Friendly	Denmark	1 – 1	England	Copenhagen, Denmark
Match 648	Elstrup 56'	Report	Lineker 27'	Stadium: Idrætsparken; Attendance: 18,400; Referee: Jaap Uilenberg (Netherlands)

6 September 1990 FIFA World Cup qualification Group 2	Sweden	0 – 0	England	Solna, Sweden
Match 649		Report		Stadium: Råsundastadion; Attendance: 38,558; Referee: Hurbert Forstinger (Austria)

11 October 1990 FIFA World Cup qualification Group 2	Poland	0 – 0	England	Chorzów, Poland
Match 650		Report		Stadium: Stadion Śląski; Attendance: 35,000; Referee: Emilio Soriano Aladrén (Spain)

15 November International Friendly	England	0 – 0	Italy	London, England
Match 651		Report		Stadium: Wembley; Attendance: 67,500; Referee: Hurbert Forstinger (Austria)

13 December International Friendly	England	2 – 1	Yugoslavia	London, England
Match 652	Robson 1', 70'	Report	Škoro 17'	Stadium: Wembley; Attendance: 34,796; Referee: Dieter Pauly (West Germany)

== 1990s ==
=== 1990 ===
28 March International Friendly	England	1 – 0	Brazil	London, England
Match 653	Lineker 37'	Report		Stadium: Wembley; Attendance: 80,000; Referee: Klaus Perchel (East Germany)

25 April International Friendly	England	4 – 2	Czechoslovakia	London, England
Match 654	Bull 16', 55'; Pearce 23'; Gascoigne 89'	Report	Skuhravý 11'; Kubík 81'	Stadium: Wembley; Attendance: 21,342; Referee: Michel Girand (France)

15 May International Friendly	England	1 – 0	Denmark	London, England
Match 655	Lineker 54'	Report		Stadium: Wembley; Attendance: 27,643; Referee: James McCluskey (Scotland)

22 May International Friendly	England	1 – 2	Uruguay	London, England
Match 656	Barnes 51'	Report	Ostolaza 27'; Perdomo 62'	Stadium: Wembley; Attendance: 38,751; Referee: Pietro D'elia (Italy)

2 June International Friendly	Tunisia	1 – 1	England	Tunis, Tunisia
Match 657	Hergal 26'	Report	Bull 89'	Stadium: Stade El Menzah; Attendance: 25,000; Referee: Rachid Medjiba (Algeria)

11 June 1990 FIFA World Cup Group F	England	1 – 1	Republic of Ireland	Cagliari, Italy
21:00 CEST (UTC+02); Match 658	Lineker 8'	Report	Sheedy 73'	Stadium: Stadio Sant'Elia; Attendance: 35,238; Referee: Aron Schmidhuber (West Germany)

16 June 1990 FIFA World Cup Group F	England	0 – 0	Netherlands	Cagliari, Italy
21:00 CEST (UTC+02); Match 659		Report		Stadium: Stadio Sant'Elia; Attendance: 35,267; Referee: Zoran Petrović (Yugoslavia)

21 June 1990 FIFA World Cup Group F	England	1 – 0	Egypt	Cagliari, Italy
21:00 CEST (UTC+02); Match 660	Wright 64'	Report		Stadium: Stadio Sant'Elia; Attendance: 34,959; Referee: Kurt Röthlisberger (Switzerland)

26 June 1990 FIFA World Cup Round of 16	England	1 – 0 (a.e.t.)	Belgium	Bologna, Italy
21:00 CEST (UTC+02); Match 661	Platt 119'	Report		Stadium: Stadio Renato Dall'Ara; Attendance: 34,520; Referee: Peter Mikkelsen (Denmark)

1 July 1990 FIFA World Cup Quarter-final	England	3 – 2 (a.e.t.)	Cameroon	Naples, Italy
21:00 CEST (UTC+02); Match 662	Platt 25'; Lineker 83' (pen.), 105' (pen.)	Report	Kundé 61' (pen.); Ekéké 65'	Stadium: Stadio San Paolo; Attendance: 55,205; Referee: Edgardo Codesal Méndez (Mexico)

4 July 1990 FIFA World Cup Semi-final	West Germany	1 – 1 (a.e.t.) (4 – 3 p)	England	Turin, Italy
20:00 CEST (UTC+02); Match 663	Brehme 60'	Report	Lineker 80'	Stadium: Stadio delle Alpi; Attendance: 62,628; Referee: José Ramiz Wright (Brazil)
	Penalties
	Brehme (penalty scored); Matthäus (penalty scored); Riedle (penalty scored); Thon (penalty scored)		(penalty scored) Lineker; (penalty scored) Beardsley; (penalty scored) Platt; (penalty missed) Pearce; (penalty missed) Waddle

7 July 1990 FIFA World Cup Third place	Italy	2 – 1	England	Bari, Italy
20:00 CEST (UTC+02); Match 664	Baggio 71'; Schillaci 86' (pen.)	Report	Platt 81'	Stadium: Stadio San Nicola; Attendance: 51,426; Referee: Joël Quiniou (France)

12 September International Friendly	England	1 – 0	Hungary	London, England
Match 665	Lineker 44'	Report		Stadium: Wembley; Attendance: 51,459; Referee: Erik Fredriksson (Sweden)

17 October UEFA Euro 1992 qualifying Group 7	England	2 – 0	Poland	London, England
20:00 BST (UTC+01); Match 666	Lineker 39' (pen.); Beardsley 89'	Report		Stadium: Wembley; Attendance: 77,040; Referee: Tullio Lanese (Italy)

14 November UEFA Euro 1992 qualifying Group 7	Republic of Ireland	1 – 1	England	Dublin, Republic of Ireland
13:30 GMT (UTC); Match 667	Cascarino 79'	Report	Platt 67'	Stadium: Lansdowne Road; Attendance: 46,000; Referee: Pietro D'elia (Italy)

=== 1991 ===
6 February International Friendly	England	2 – 0	Cameroon	London, England
Match 668	Lineker 20' (pen.), 61'	Report		Stadium: Wembley; Attendance: 61,075; Referee: John Blankenstein (Netherlands)

27 March UEFA Euro 1992 qualifying Group 7	England	1 – 1	Republic of Ireland	London, England
20:00 BST (UTC+01); Match 669	Dixon 9'	UEFA Report	Quinn 29'	Stadium: Wembley; Attendance: 77,753; Referee: Kurt Röthlisberger (Switzerland)

1 May UEFA Euro 1992 qualifying Group 7	Turkey	0 – 1	England	İzmir, Turkey
18:00 EEST (UTC+03); Match 670		UEFA Report	Wise 32'	Stadium: İzmir Alsancak Stadium; Attendance: 25,000; Referee: Wolf-Gunter Wiesel (Germany)

21 May England Challenge Cup	England	3 – 1	Soviet Union	London, England
Match 671	Smith 16'; Platt 43' (pen.), 89'	Report	Tatarchuk 9'	Stadium: Wembley; Attendance: 23,789; Referee: Emilio Soriano Aladrén (Spain)

25 May England Challenge Cup	England	2 – 2	Argentina	London, England
Match 672	Lineker 15'; Platt 50'	Report	García 66'; Franco 70'	Stadium: Wembley; Attendance: 44,497; Referee: Zoran Petrović (Yugoslavia)

1 June International Friendly	Australia	0 – 1	England	Sydney, Australia
Match 673		Report	Gray 40' (o.g.)	Stadium: Sydney Football Stadium; Attendance: 35,472; Referee: Barry Tasker (New Zealand)

3 June International Friendly	New Zealand	0 – 1	England	Auckland, New Zealand
Match 674		Report	Lineker 90'	Stadium: Mount Smart Stadium; Attendance: 17,520; Referee: Dennis Voutsinas (Australia)

8 June International Friendly	New Zealand	0 – 2	England	Wellington, New Zealand
Match 675		Report	Pearce 12'; Hirst 50'	Stadium: Athletic Park; Attendance: 12,000; Referee: Richard Lorenc (Australia)

12 June International Friendly	Malaysia	2 – 4	England	Kuala Lumpur, Malaysia
Match 676	Marjan 52', 76'	Report	Lineker 1', 23', 30', 70'	Stadium: Stadium Merdeka; Attendance: 38,000; Referee: A Letchumberabamy (Malaysia)

11 September International Friendly	England	0 – 1	Germany	London, England
Match 677		Report	Riedle 45'	Stadium: Wembley; Attendance: 59,493; Referee: Alexey Spirin (Soviet Union)

16 October UEFA Euro 1992 qualifying Group 7	England	1 – 0	Turkey	London, England
20:00 BST (UTC+01); Match 678	Smith 21'	Report		Stadium: Wembley; Attendance: 50,896; Referee: Antonio Martin Navarette (Spain)

13 November UEFA Euro 1992 qualifying Group 7	Poland	1 – 1	England	Poznań, Poland
18:30 CET (UTC+01); Match 679	Szewczyk 32'	Report	Lineker 77'	Stadium: Stadion Miejski; Attendance: 15,000; Referee: Hurbert Forstinger (Austria)

=== 1992 ===
19 February International Friendly	England	2 – 0	France	London, England
Match 680	Shearer 44'; Lineker 73'	Report		Stadium: Wembley; Attendance: 58,723; Referee: Aron Schmidhuber (Germany)

25 March International Friendly	Czechoslovakia	2 – 2	England	Prague, Czechoslovakia
Match 681	Skuhravý 20'; Chovanec 58'	Report	Merson 27'; Keown 66'	Stadium: Strahovský Stadion; Attendance: 6,000; Referee: Gerhard Kapl (Austria)

29 April International Friendly	CIS	2 – 2	England	Moscow, Russia
Match 682	Tskhadadze 44'; Kiriakov 54'	Report	Lineker 15'; Steven 72'	Stadium: Luzhniki Stadium; Attendance: 28,000; Referee: Piotr Werner (Poland)

12 May International Friendly	Hungary	0 – 1	England	Budapest, Hungary
Match 683		Report	Webb 56'	Stadium: Népstadion; Attendance: 25,000; Referee: Heinz Holzmann (Austria)

17 May International Friendly	England	1 – 1	Brazil	London, England
Match 684	Platt 49'	Report	Bebeto 25'	Stadium: Wembley; Attendance: 53,428; Referee: James McCluskey (Scotland)

3 June International Friendly	Finland	1 – 2	England	Helsinki, Finland
Match 685	Hjelm 27' (pen.)	Report	Platt 45', 62'	Stadium: Olympiastadion; Attendance: 16,101; Referee: Bo Karlsson (Sweden)

11 June UEFA Euro 1992 Group 1	Denmark	0 – 0	England	Malmö, Sweden
20:15 CEST (UTC+02); Match 686		Report		Stadium: Malmö Idrottsplats; Attendance: 26,385; Referee: John Blankenstein (Netherlands)

14 June UEFA Euro 1992 Group 1	France	0 – 0	England	Malmö, Sweden
17:15 CEST (UTC+02); Match 687		Report		Stadium: Malmö Idrottsplats; Attendance: 26,535; Referee: Sándor Puhl (Hungary)

17 June UEFA Euro 1992 Group 1	Sweden	2 – 1	England	Solna, Sweden
20:15 CEST (UTC+02); Match 688	Eriksson 51'; Brolin 82'	Report	Platt 4'	Stadium: Råsunda Stadium; Attendance: 30,126; Referee: José Rosa dos Santos, (Portugal)

9 September International Friendly	Spain	1 – 0	England	Santander, Spain
Match 689	Fonseca 11'	Report		Stadium: Estadio El Sardinero; Attendance: 22,000; Referee: Jose Veiga Trigo, (Portugal)

14 October 1994 FIFA World Cup qualification Group 2	England	1 – 1	Norway	London, England
Match 690	Platt 56'	Report	Rekdal 77'	Stadium: Wembley; Attendance: 51,441; Referee: Arturo P Brizio Carter (Mexico)

18 November 1994 FIFA World Cup qualification Group 2	England	4 – 0	Turkey	London, England
Match 691	Gascoigne 16', 62'; Shearer 28'; Pearce 61'	Report		Stadium: Wembley; Attendance: 42,984; Referee: Bo Karlsson (Sweden)

=== 1993 ===
17 February 1994 FIFA World Cup qualification Group 2	England	6 – 0	San Marino	London, England
Match 692	Platt 13', 24', 67', 83'; Palmer 76'; Ferdinand 86'	Report		Stadium: Wembley; Attendance: 51,154; Referee: Roger Philippi (Luxembourg)

31 March 1994 FIFA World Cup qualification Group 2	Turkey	0 – 2	England	İzmir, Turkey
Match 693		Report	Platt 6'; Gascoigne 44'	Stadium: Atatürk Stadium; Attendance: 60,000; Referee: Fabio Baldas (Italy)

28 April 1994 FIFA World Cup qualification Group 2	England	2 – 2	Netherlands	London, England
Match 694	Barnes 2'; Platt 23'	Report	Bergkamp 34' van Vossen 85' (pen.)	Stadium: Wembley; Attendance: 73,163; Referee: Peter Mikkelsen (Denmark)

29 May 1994 FIFA World Cup qualification Group 2	Poland	1 – 1	England	Chorzów, Poland
Match 695	Adamczuk 36'	Report	Wright 84'	Stadium: Stadion Śląski; Attendance: 60,000; Referee: Serge Muhmenthaler (Switzerland)

2 June 1994 FIFA World Cup qualification Group 2	Norway	2 – 0	England	Oslo, Norway
Match 696	Leonhardsen 42'; Bohinen 48'	Report		Stadium: Ullevaal Stadion; Attendance: 22,256; Referee: Sándor Puhl (Hungary)

9 June United States Cup	United States	2 – 0	England	Boston, MA, United States
Match 697	Dooley 42'; Lalas 72'	Report		Stadium: Foxboro Stadium; Attendance: 37,652; Referee: Alfred Weiser (Austria)

13 June United States Cup	England	1 – 1	Brazil	Washington, D.C., United States
Match 698	Platt 47'	Report	Márcio Santos 76'	Stadium: Robert F. Kennedy Memorial Stadium; Attendance: 54,118; Referee: Hélder Dias (United States)

19 June United States Cup	England	1 – 2	Germany	Detroit, MI, United States
Match 699	Platt 31'	Report	Effenberg 26'; Klinsmann 55'	Stadium: Silverdome; Attendance: 62,126; Referee: Ernesto Filippi Cavani (Uruguay)

8 September 1994 FIFA World Cup qualification Group 2	England	3 – 0	Poland	London, England
Match 700	Ferdinand 5'; Gascoigne 49'; Pearce 53'	Report		Stadium: Wembley; Attendance: 71,220; Referee: Franz van den Wijngaert (Belgium)

13 October 1994 FIFA World Cup qualification Group 2	Netherlands	2 – 0	England	Rotterdam, Netherlands
Match 701	Koeman 62'; Bergkamp 68'	Report		Stadium: de Kuip; Attendance: 48,000; Referee: Karl-Josef Assenmacher (Germany)

17 November 1994 FIFA World Cup qualification Group 2	San Marino	1 – 7	England	Bologna, Italy
Match 702	Gualtieri 1'	Report	Ince 22', 73'; Wright 34', 46', 78', 90'; Ferdinand 38'	Stadium: Stadio Renato Dall'Ara; Attendance: 2,378; Referee: Mohamed Nazri Abdullah (Malaysia)

=== 1994 ===
9 March International Friendly	England	1 – 0	Denmark	London, England
Match 703	Platt 18'	Report		Stadium: Wembley; Attendance: 71,970; Referee: Jaap Uilenberg (Netherlands)

17 May International Friendly	England	5 – 0	Greece	London, England
Match 704	Anderton 23'; Beardsley 37'; Platt 44' (pen.), 55'; Shearer 65'	Report		Stadium: Wembley; Attendance: 23,689; Referee: James McCluskey (Scotland)

22 May International Friendly	England	0 – 0	Norway	London, England
Match 705		Report		Stadium: Wembley; Attendance: 64,327; Referee: Kim Milton Nielsen (Denmark)

7 September International Friendly	England	2 – 0	United States	London, England
Match 706	Shearer 33', 40'	Report		Stadium: Wembley; Attendance: 38,629; Referee: Antonio Jesús López Nieto (Spain)

12 October International Friendly	England	1 – 1	Romania	London, England
Match 707	Lee 45'	Report	Dumitrescu 37'	Stadium: Wembley; Attendance: 48,754; Referee: Joël Quiniou (France)

16 November International Friendly	England	1 – 0	Nigeria	London, England
Match 708	Platt 41'	Report		Stadium: Wembley; Attendance: 37,196; Referee: Leif Sundell (Sweden)

=== 1995 ===
15 February International Friendly	Republic of Ireland	(1 – 0)	England	Dublin, Republic of Ireland
Match 709	Kelly 22'	Match Abandoned 27' (Note: Match 709 was abandoned after 27 minutes following crowd trouble. The result was declared void but players were still credited with international caps.); Report		Stadium: Lansdowne Road; Attendance: 46,000; Referee: Dick Jol (Netherlands)

29 March International Friendly	England	0 – 0	Uruguay	London, England
Match 710		Report		Stadium: Wembley; Attendance: 34,849; Referee: Hellmut Krug (Germany)

3 June Umbro Cup	England	2 – 1	Japan	London, England
Match 711	Anderton 48'; Platt 87' (pen.)	Report	Ihara 62' Hashiratani (red card) 86'	Stadium: Wembley; Attendance: 21,142; Referee: Jaap Uilenberg (Netherlands)

8 June Umbro Cup	England	3 – 3	Sweden	Leeds, England
Match 712	Sheringham 45'; Platt 87'; Anderton 90'	Report	Mild 11', 36'; Andersson 46'	Stadium: Elland Road; Attendance: 32,008; Referee: Leslie Mottram (Scotland)

11 June Umbro Cup	England	1 – 3	Brazil	London, England
Match 713	Le Saux 38'	Report	Juninho 54'; Ronaldo 61'; Edmundo 76'	Stadium: Wembley; Attendance: 67,318; Referee: Pierluigi Pairetto (Italy)

6 September International Friendly	England	0 – 0	Colombia	London, England
Match 714		Report		Stadium: Wembley; Attendance: 20,000; Referee: Marc Betta (France)

11 October International Friendly	Norway	0 – 0	England	Oslo, Norway
Match 715		Report		Stadium: Ullevaal Stadion; Attendance: 21,006; Referee: Karl-Erik Nilsson (Swedish Football Association)

15 November International Friendly	England	3 – 1	Switzerland	London, England
Match 716	Pearce 45'; Sheringham 56'; Stone 78'	Report	Knup 41'	Stadium: Wembley; Attendance: 29,874; Referee: Sándor Puhl (Hungary)

12 December International Friendly	England	1 – 1	Portugal	London, England
Match 717	Stone 44'	Report	Alves 59'	Stadium: Wembley; Attendance: 28,592; Referee: Rune Pedersen (Norway)

=== 1996 ===
27 March International Friendly	England	1 – 0	Bulgaria	London, England
Match 718	Ferdinand 7'	Report		Stadium: Wembley; Attendance: 29,708; Referee: Günter Benkö (Austria)

24 April International Friendly	England	0 – 0	Croatia	London, England
Match 719		Report		Stadium: Wembley; Attendance: 33,650; Referee: Zbigniew Przesmycki (Poland)

18 May International Friendly	England	3 – 0	Hungary	London, England
Match 720	Anderton 38', 62'; Platt 52'	Report		Stadium: Wembley; Attendance: 34,184; Referee: Markus Merk (Germany)

23 May International Friendly	China	0 – 3	England	Beijing, China PR
Match 721		Report	Barmby 30', 53'; Gascoigne 64'	Stadium: Workers Stadium; Attendance: 65,000; Referee: Pierluigi Collina (Italy)

8 June UEFA Euro 1996 Group A	England	1 – 1	Switzerland	London, England
15:00 BST (UTC+01); Match 722	Shearer 23'	UEFA Report	Türkyilmaz 83' (pen.)	Stadium: Wembley; Attendance: 76,567; Referee: Manuel Díaz Vega (Spain)

15 June UEFA Euro 1996 Group A	Scotland	0 – 2	England	London, England
15:00 BST (UTC+01); Match 723		UEFA Report	Shearer 53'; Gascoigne 79'	Stadium: Wembley; Attendance: 76,864; Referee: Pierluigi Pairetto (Italy)

18 June UEFA Euro 1996 Group A	Netherlands	1 – 4	England	London, England
19:30 BST (UTC+01); Match 724	Kluivert 78'	UEFA Report	Shearer 23' (pen.), 57'; Sheringham 51', 62'	Stadium: Wembley; Attendance: 76,798; Referee: Gerd Grabher (Austria)

22 June UEFA Euro 1996 Quarter-final	Spain	0 – 0 (a.e.t.) (2 – 4 p)	England	London, England
15:00 BST (UTC+01); Match 725		UEFA Report		Stadium: Wembley; Attendance: 75,440; Referee: Marc Betta (France)
	Penalties
	Hierro (penalty missed); Amor (penalty scored); Belsué (penalty scored); Nadal (penalty missed)		(penalty scored) Shearer; (penalty scored) Platt; (penalty scored) Pearce; (penalty scored) Gascoigne

26 June UEFA Euro 1996 Semi-final	Germany	1 – 1 (a.e.t.) (6 – 5 p)	England	London, England
19:30 BST (UTC+01); Match 726	Kuntz 16'	UEFA Report	Shearer 3'	Stadium: Wembley; Attendance: 75,862; Referee: Sándor Puhl (Hungary)
	Penalties
	Hässler (penalty scored); Strunz (penalty scored); Reuter (penalty scored); Ziege (penalty scored); Kuntz (penalty scored); Möller (penalty scored)		(penalty scored) Shearer; (penalty scored) Platt; (penalty scored) Pearce; (penalty scored) Gascoigne; (penalty scored) Sheringham; (penalty missed) Southgate

1 September 1998 FIFA World Cup qualification Group 2	Moldova	0 – 3	England	Chişinău, Moldova
Match 727		Report	Barmby 24'; Gascoigne 25'; Shearer 61'	Stadium: Stadionul Republican; Attendance: 9,500; Referee: Ilkka Koho (Finland)

9 October 1998 FIFA World Cup qualification Group 2	England	2 – 1	Poland	London, England
Match 728	Shearer 24', 37'	Report	Citko 7'	Stadium: Wembley; Attendance: 74,663; Referee: Hellmut Krug (Germany)

9 November 1998 FIFA World Cup qualification Group 2	Georgia	0 – 2	England	Tbilisi, Georgia
Match 729		Report	Sheringham 15'; Ferdinand 37'	Stadium: Boris Paichadze Stadium; Attendance: 48,000; Referee: Jorge Montieiro Coroado (Portugal)

=== 1997 ===
12 February 1998 FIFA World Cup qualification Group 2	England	0 – 1	Italy	London, England
Match 730		Report	Zola 19'	Stadium: Wembley; Attendance: 75,055; Referee: Sándor Puhl (Hungary)

29 March International Friendly	England	2 – 0	Mexico	London, England
Match 731	Sheringham 20' (pen.); Fowler 55'	Report		Stadium: Wembley; Attendance: 48,076; Referee: Vítor Melo Pereira (Portugal)

30 April 1998 FIFA World Cup qualification Group 2	England	2 – 0	Georgia	London, England
Match 732	Sheringham 43'; Shearer 90'	Report		Stadium: Wembley; Attendance: 71,206; Referee: Rémi Harrel (France)

24 May International Friendly	England	2 – 1	South Africa	Manchester, England
Match 733	Lee 20'; Wright 76'	Report	Masinga 43'	Stadium: Old Trafford; Attendance: 52,676; Referee: Anders Frisk (Sweden)

31 May 1998 FIFA World Cup qualification Group 2	Poland	0 – 2	England	Chorzów, Poland
Match 734		Report	Shearer 6'; Sheringham 90'	Stadium: Stadion Śląski; Attendance: 35,000; Referee: Urs Meier (Switzerland)

4 June Tournoi de France	England	2 – 0	Italy	Nantes, France
Match 735	Wright 26'; Scholes 43'	Report		Stadium: Stade de la Beaujoire; Attendance: 30,000; Referee: Günter Benkö (Austria)

7 June Tournoi de France	France	0 – 1	England	Montpellier, France
Match 736		Report	Shearer 86'	Stadium: Stade de la Mosson; Attendance: 28,000; Referee: Said Belqola (Morocco)

10 June Tournoi de France	England	0 – 1	Brazil	Paris, France
Match 737		Report	Romário 61'	Stadium: Parc des Princes; Attendance: 50,000; Referee: John Toro Rendón (Colombia)

10 September 1998 FIFA World Cup qualification Group 2	England	4 – 0	Moldova	London, England
Match 738	Scholes 28'; Wright 46', 90'; Gascoigne 80'	Report		Stadium: Wembley; Attendance: 74,102; Referee: Karl-Erik Nilsson (Sweden)

11 October 1998 FIFA World Cup qualification Group 2	Italy	0 – 0	England	Rome, Italy
Match 739	Di Livio (red card) 77'	Report		Stadium: Stadio Olimpico; Attendance: 81,200; Referee: Mario van der Ende (Netherlands)

15 November International Friendly	England	2 – 0	Cameroon	London, England
Match 740	Scholes 45+1'; Fowler 45+2'	Report		Stadium: Wembley; Attendance: 46,176; Referee: Terje Hauge (Norway)

=== 1998 ===
11 February International Friendly	England	0 – 2	Chile	London, England
Match 741		Report	Salas 44', 79'	Stadium: Wembley; Attendance: 65,228; Referee: Ryszard Wójcik (Poland)

25 March International Friendly	Switzerland	1 – 1	England	Bern, Switzerland
Match 742	Vega 37'	Report	Merson 70'	Stadium: Wankdorf Stadium; Attendance: 17,100; Referee: Pascal Garibian (France)

22 April International Friendly	England	3 – 0	Portugal	London, England
Match 743	Shearer 5', 66'; Sheringham 46'	Report	Capucho (red card) 80'	Stadium: Wembley; Attendance: 63,463; Referee: Manuel Díaz Vega (Spain)

23 May International Friendly	England	0 – 0	Saudi Arabia	London, England
15:00 BST (UTC+01); Match 744		Report		Stadium: Wembley; Attendance: 63,733; Referee: Dick Jol (Netherlands)

27 May King Hassan II Tournament	Morocco	0 – 1	England	Casablanca, Morocco
Match 745		Report	Owen 59'	Stadium: Stade Mohamed V Attendance: 80,000; Referee: Mourad Daami (Tunisia)

29 May King Hassan II Tournament	Belgium	0 – 0 (4 – 3 p)	England	Casablanca, Morocco
Match 746		(Note: Extra time was not played. The regulation 90 minutes were immediately followed by a penalty shootout.); Report		Stadium: Stade Mohamed V Attendance: 18,000; Referee: Abderrahim El Arjoune (Morocco)
	Penalties
	(penalty missed) Scifo; (penalty scored) Van Meir; (penalty scored) Borkelmans; (penalty scored) M. Mpenza; (penalty scored) Vande Walle		(penalty missed) Lee; (penalty scored) Owen; (penalty scored) Beckham; (penalty scored) Merson; (penalty missed) L. Ferdinand

15 June 1998 FIFA World Cup Group G	England	2 – 0	Tunisia	Marseille, France
14:30 CEST (UTC+02); Match 747	Shearer 42'; Scholes 89'	FIFA Report		Stadium: Stade Vélodrome; Attendance: 55,000; Referee: Masayoshi Okada (Japan)

22 June 1998 FIFA World Cup Group G	Romania	2 – 1	England	Toulouse, France
21:00 CEST (UTC+02); Match 748	Moldovan 47'; Petrescu 90'	FIFA Report	Owen 81'	Stadium: Stadium Municipal; Attendance: 33,500; Referee: Marc Batta (France)

26 June 1998 FIFA World Cup Group G	Colombia	0 – 2	England	Lens, France
21:00 CEST (UTC+02); Match 749		FIFA Report	Anderton 20'; Beckham 30'	Stadium: Stade Félix Bollaert; Attendance: 38,100; Referee: Arturo Brizio Carter (Mexico)

30 June 1998 FIFA World Cup Round of 16	Argentina	2 – 2 (a.e.t.) (4 – 3 p)	England	Saint-Étienne, France
21:00 CEST (UTC+02); Match 750	Batistuta 6' (pen.); Zanetti 45+1'	FIFA Report	Shearer 10' (pen.); Owen 16'; Beckham (red card) 47'	Stadium: Stade Geoffroy-Guichard; Attendance: 30,600; Referee: Kim Milton Nielsen (Denmark)
	Penalties
	Berti (penalty scored); Crespo (penalty missed); Verón (penalty scored); Gallardo (penalty scored); Ayala (penalty scored)		(penalty scored) Shearer; (penalty missed) Ince; (penalty scored) Merson; (penalty scored) Owen; (penalty missed) Batty

5 September UEFA Euro 2000 qualifying Group 5	Sweden	2 – 1	England	Solna, Sweden
18:00 CEST (UTC+02); Match 751	Andersson 30'; Mjällby 32'	UEFA Report	Shearer 1' Ince (red card) 67'	Stadium: Råsunda Stadium; Attendance: 35,394; Referee: Pierluigi Collina (Italy)

10 October UEFA Euro 2000 qualifying Group 5	England	0 – 0	Bulgaria	London, England
15:00 BST (UTC+01); Match 752		UEFA Report		Stadium: Wembley; Attendance: 72,794; Referee: László Vágner (Hungary)

14 October UEFA Euro 2000 qualifying Group 5	Luxembourg	0 – 3	England	Luxembourg City, Luxembourg
20:30 CEST (UTC+02); Match 753		UEFA Report	Owen 18'; Shearer 39' (pen.); Southgate 88'	Stadium: Stade Josy Barthel; Attendance: 8,054; Referee: Sotirios Vorgias (Greece)

18 November International Friendly	England	2 – 0	Czech Republic	London, England
20:00 GMT (UTC); Match 754	Anderton 23'; Merson 39'	Report		Stadium: Wembley; Attendance: 38,535; Referee: Urs Meier (Switzerland)

=== 1999 ===
10 February International Friendly	England	0 – 2	France	London, England
20:00 GMT (UTC); Match 755		Report	Anelka 68', 76'	Stadium: Wembley; Attendance: 74,111; Referee: Hellmut Krug (Germany)

27 March UEFA Euro 2000 qualifying Group 5	England	3 – 1	Poland	London, England
15:00 GMT (UTC); Match 756	Scholes 12', 22', 70'	UEFA Report	Brzęczek 29'	Stadium: Wembley; Attendance: 73,836; Referee: Vítor Melo Pereira (Portugal)

28 April International Friendly	Hungary	1 – 1	England	Budapest, Hungary
20:15 CEST (UTC+02); Match 757	Hrutka 76'	Report	Shearer 21' (pen.)	Stadium: Népstadion; Attendance: 20,000; Referee: Lutz Michael Fröhlich (Germany)

5 June UEFA Euro 2000 qualifying Group 5	England	0 – 0	Sweden	London, England
15:00 BST (UTC+01); Match 758	Scholes (red card) 51'	UEFA Report		Stadium: Wembley; Attendance: 75,824; Referee: José María García-Aranda (Spain)

9 June UEFA Euro 2000 qualifying Group 5	Bulgaria	1 – 1	England	Sofia, Bulgaria
19:25 EEST (UTC+03); Match 759	Markov 17' M. Petrov (red card) 53'	UEFA Report	Shearer 14'	Stadium: Balgarska Armiya Stadium; Attendance: 22,000; Referee: Mario van der Ende (Netherlands)

4 September UEFA Euro 2000 qualifying Group 5	England	6 – 0	Luxembourg	London, England
15:00 BST (UTC+01); Match 760	Shearer 10', 27', 34'; McManaman 29', 43'; Owen 90'	UEFA Report		Stadium: Wembley; Attendance: 68,772; Referee: Sergey Shmolik (Belarus)

8 September UEFA Euro 2000 qualifying Group 5	Poland	0 – 0	England	Warsaw, Poland
20:30 CEST (UTC+02); Match 761		UEFA Report	Batty (red card) 84'	Stadium: Wojska Polskiego; Attendance: 17,000; Referee: Günter Benkö (Austria)

10 October International Friendly	England	2 – 1	Belgium	Sunderland, England
15:00 BST (UTC+01); Match 762	Shearer 6'; Redknapp 66'	Report	Strupar 14'	Stadium: Stadium of Light; Attendance: 40,987; Referee: Anders Frisk (Sweden)

13 November UEFA Euro 2000 qualifying Play-off 1st leg	Scotland	0 – 2	England	Glasgow, Scotland
14:00 GMT (UTC); Match 763		UEFA Report	Scholes 21', 42'	Stadium: Hampden Park; Attendance: 50,132; Referee: Manuel Díaz Vega (Spain)

17 November UEFA Euro 2000 qualifying Play-off 2nd leg	England	0 – 1 (2 – 1 agg.)	Scotland	London, England
20:00 GMT (UTC); Match 764		UEFA Report	Hutchison 38'	Stadium: Wembley; Attendance: 75,848; Referee: Pierluigi Collina (Italy)
