= Four Nations Tournament (1988) =

1988 Four Nations Tournament
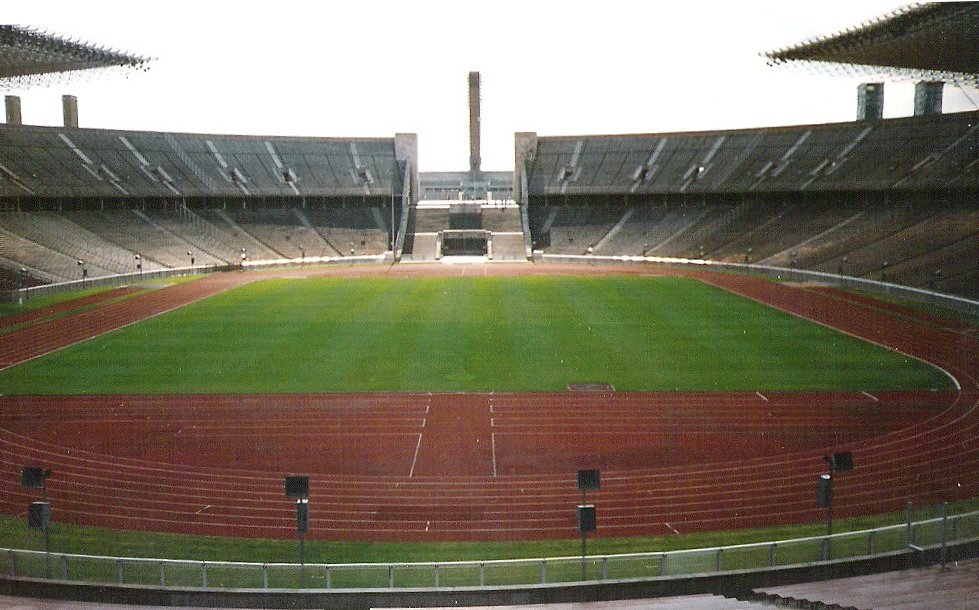
- Berlin's Olympic Stadium

Tournament details
- Host country: West Berlin
- Dates: 31 March – 2 April 1988
- Teams: 4 (from 2 confederations)
- Venue: 1

Final positions
- Champions: Sweden
- Runners-up: Soviet Union
- Third place: West Germany
- Fourth place: Argentina

Tournament statistics
- Matches played: 4
- Goals scored: 11 (2.75 per match)
- Top scorer(s): (Soviet Union) Oleh Protasov (2 goals)

The Four Nations Tournament (German: Vier-Länder-Turnier) was an invitational association football competition between four national teams, organized by the German Football Association (DFB). The teams of West Germany, Soviet Union, Argentina and Sweden competed against one another at Olympic Stadium, West Berlin from 31 March to 2 April 1988, with Sweden the tournament winners.

== Background ==
West Germany had been elected host country of the 1988 European Football Championship finals, but because of the ongoing division of Germany, UEFA decided against using West Berlin as a venue for any of the matches at the finals. This was a compromise taken at the insistence of the Soviet Union and East Germany. The DFB, led by Hermann Neuberger, accepted and thus West Germany secured the right to host the Championship.

As compensation to West Berlin, whose Olympic Stadium would not be used at that tournament, a Four Nations Tournament was staged there over Easter 1988.

== Tournament ==
The teams invited to the tournament, along with 1986 World Cup runners-up West Germany, were:

- Argentina, the reigning world champions
- Soviet Union
- Sweden

Two semi-finals were played, with the winners facing each other in the final, and the losers playing a third-place playoff. In the event of a draw after 90 minutes, there was no extra time but an immediate penalty shootout.

The first semi-final was between West Germany and Sweden and was of middling quality. After 90 minutes the scores were level at 1–1, and the Swedish side pulled through 4–2 on penalties. In the second semi, the Soviet Union beat Argentina 4–2 to reach the final.

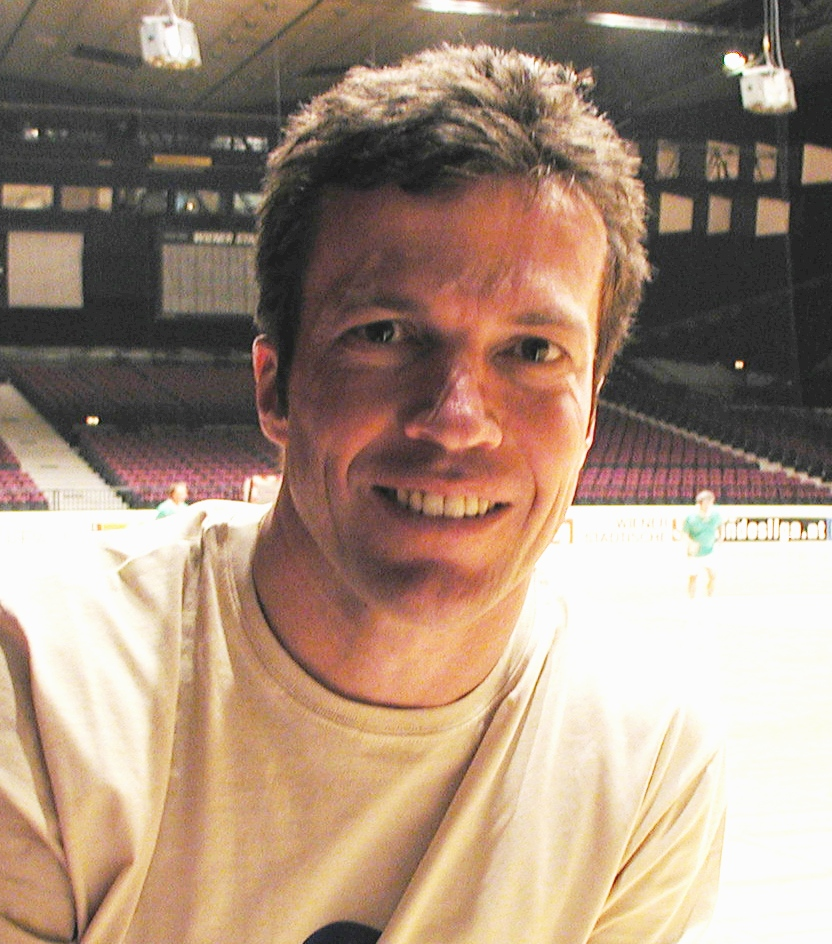
Lothar Matthäus (West Germany)

The third-place game was won by West Germany against Argentina, with Lothar Matthäus scoring the only goal of the game. The final was won by outsiders Sweden, 2–0, against the Soviet Union, making Sweden the tournament winners.

== Reception ==
Although the tournament included exciting teams and world-class players, like Argentina with Claudio Caniggia and Diego Maradona, as well as European Championship favorites the USSR (with star players Oleh Protasov and Rinat Dasayev), it didn't catch the public's imagination. The matches were often poorly-attended, the Argentine team's performance as world champions was disappointing, and the Germans, using the tournament as a dress rehearsal for their home Euro tournament, were average at best on the pitch.

In the end the European Championships were an organizational success and very well-attended. West Germany eventually reached the semi-finals, the USSR were beaten finalists, but had been beaten in the Four Nations by Sweden, who had not even qualified.

== Nasazzi's baton ==
In the course of this tournament, in the unofficial international football championship Nasazzi's Baton, the baton changed hands twice. Firstly on 31 March 1988, the Soviet Union won the baton from Argentina. But, two days later, the Swedish team took the baton from the Soviet team by winning the Four Nations Tournament final. To this day, the USSR's two-day tenure as holder of Nasazzi's baton remains the shortest single championship reign in the baton's history.

== Results ==
Semi-finals
31 March – West Berlin
West Germany	1 (2)
Sweden (pen.)	1 (4)
31 March – West Berlin
Argentina	2
Soviet Union	4

Final
2 April – West Berlin
Sweden	2
Soviet Union	0
Third place
2 April – West Berlin
West Germany	1
Argentina	0

=== Semi-finals ===
31 March 1988

Argentina	2–4	Soviet Union
Troglio 18'; Maradona 67'	Report	Zavarov 14'; Lytovchenko 15'; Protasov 62', 79' (pen.)

Olympiastadion, West Berlin
Attendance: 17,000
Referee: Joël Quiniou (France)

31 March 1988

West Germany	1–1	Sweden
Allofs 42'	Report	Truedsson 74'
Penalties
Thon (penalty scored); Eckstein (penalty scored); Matthäus (penalty missed); Völler (penalty missed)	2–4	(penalty scored) Prytz; (penalty scored) P. Larsson; (penalty scored) Strömberg; (penalty scored) Thern

Olympiastadion, West Berlin
Attendance: 23,709
Referee: Lajos Hartmann (Hungary)

=== Third-place playoff ===
2 April 1988

West Germany	1–0	Argentina
Matthäus 30'	Report

Olympiastadion, West Berlin
Attendance: 25,000
Referee: Kurt Röthlisberger (Switzerland)

=== Final ===
2 April 1988

Sweden	2–0	Soviet Union
Eskilsson 52'; Holmqvist 88'	Report

Olympiastadion, West Berlin
Attendance: 25,000
Referee: Marcel Van Langenhove (Belgium)

== See also ==
- UEFA Euro 1988
