= 1990 FIFA World Cup qualification – UEFA Group 6 =

Football tournament qualification stage

The 1990 FIFA World Cup qualification UEFA Group 6 was a UEFA qualifying group for the 1990 FIFA World Cup. The group consisted of Hungary, Malta, Northern Ireland, Spain and the Republic of Ireland.

The group was won by Spain, who qualified for the 1990 FIFA World Cup. The Republic of Ireland also qualified as runners-up for their first ever World Cup Finals.

== Standings ==
Pos	Team	Pld	W	D	L	GF	GA	GD	Pts	Qualification	Spain national football team	Republic of Ireland national football team	Hungary national football team	Northern Ireland national football team	Malta national football team
1	Spain	8	6	1	1	20	3	+17	13	Qualification to 1990 FIFA World Cup	—	2–0	4–0	4–0	4–0
2	Republic of Ireland	8	5	2	1	10	2	+8	12	Qualification to 1990 FIFA World Cup	1–0	—	2–0	3–0	2–0
3	Hungary	8	2	4	2	8	12	−4	8		2–2	0–0	—	1–0	1–1
4	Northern Ireland	8	2	1	5	6	12	−6	5		0–2	0–0	1–2	—	3–0
5	Malta	8	0	2	6	3	18	−15	2		0–2	0–2	2–2	0–2	—

=== Results ===
21 May 1988

Northern Ireland	3 – 0	Malta
Quinn 14'; Penney 23'; Clarke 25'	(Report)

Windsor Park, Belfast
Attendance: 9,000
Referee: Carlos da Silva Valente (Portugal)

14 September 1988

Northern Ireland	0 – 0	Republic of Ireland
	(Report)

Windsor Park, Belfast
Attendance: 19,873
Referee: Michel Vautrot (France)

19 October 1988

Hungary	1 – 0	Northern Ireland
Vincze 84'	(Report)

Népstadion, Budapest
Attendance: 18,000
Referee: Kurt Röthlisberger (Switzerland)

16 November 1988

Spain	2 – 0	Republic of Ireland
Manolo 52'; Butragueño 66'	(Report)

Estadio Benito Villamarín, Seville
Attendance: 50,000
Referee: Yuri Savchenko (Soviet Union)

11 December 1988

Malta	2 – 2	Hungary
Busuttil 46', 90'	(Report)	Vincze 5'; Kiprich 56'

Ta' Qali National Stadium, Attard
Attendance: 9,964
Referee: Georgios Koukoulakis (Greece)

21 December 1988

Spain	4 – 0	Northern Ireland
Rogan 30' (o.g.); Butragueño 55'; Míchel 60' (pen.); McDonald 64' (o.g.)	(Report)

Estadio Ramón Sánchez Pizjuán, Seville
Attendance: 70,000
Referee: Marcel van Langenhove (Belgium)

22 January 1989

Malta	0 – 2	Spain
	(Report)	Míchel 15' (pen.); Beguiristain 49'

Ta' Qali National Stadium, Attard
Attendance: 15,797
Referee: David Syme (Scotland)

8 February 1989

Northern Ireland	0 – 2	Spain
	(Report)	Andrinúa 3'; Manolo 84'

Windsor Park, Belfast
Attendance: 15,000
Referee: Dieter Pauly (West Germany)

8 March 1989

Hungary	0 – 0	Republic of Ireland
	(Report)

Népstadion, Budapest
Attendance: 33,966
Referee: Zoran Petrović (Yugoslavia)

23 March 1989

Spain	4 – 0	Malta
Míchel 38', 68' (pen.); Manolo 71', 80'	(Report)

Estadio Benito Villamarín, Seville
Attendance: 41,500
Referee: Georges Sandoz (Switzerland)

12 April 1989

Hungary	1 – 1	Malta
Boda 49' (pen.)	(Report)	Busuttil 7'

Népstadion, Budapest
Attendance: 25,000
Referee: Arie Frost (Israel)

26 April 1989

Malta	0 – 2	Northern Ireland
	(Report)	Clarke 55'; O'Neill 73'

Ta' Qali National Stadium, Attard
Attendance: 15,150
Referee: Stefan Dan Petrescu (Romania)
26 April 1989

Republic of Ireland	1 – 0	Spain
Míchel 15' (o.g.)	(Report)

Lansdowne Road, Dublin
Attendance: 49,600
Referee: Horst Brummeier (Austria)

28 May 1989

Republic of Ireland	2 – 0	Malta
Houghton 32'; Moran 55'	(Report)

Lansdowne Road, Dublin
Attendance: 48,928
Referee: José Rosa dos Santos (Portugal)

4 June 1989

Republic of Ireland	2 – 0	Hungary
McGrath 33'; Cascarino 80'	(Report)

Lansdowne Road, Dublin
Attendance: 48,600
Referee: Egil Nervik (Norway)

6 September 1989

Northern Ireland	1 – 2	Hungary
Whiteside 89'	(Report)	Kovács 13'; Bognár 44'

Windsor Park, Belfast
Attendance: 8,000
Referee: Erik Fredriksson (Sweden)

11 October 1989

Republic of Ireland	3 – 0	Northern Ireland
Whelan 42'; Cascarino 48'; Houghton 57'	(Report)

Lansdowne Road, Dublin
Attendance: 46,800
Referee: Pietro D'Elia (Italy)
11 October 1989

Hungary	2 – 2	Spain
Pintér 38', 82'	(Report)	Salinas 30'; Míchel 35'

Népstadion, Budapest
Attendance: 30,000
Referee: George Courtney (England)

15 November 1989

Spain	4 – 0	Hungary
Manolo 7'; Butragueño 24'; Juanito 40'; Fernando 63'	(Report)

Estadio Ramón Sánchez Pizjuán, Seville
Attendance: 20,000
Referee: Gérard Biguet (France)
15 November 1989

Malta	0 – 2	Republic of Ireland
	(Report)	Aldridge 31', 68' (pen.)

Ta' Qali National Stadium, Attard
Attendance: 21,942
Referee: Jaap Uilenberg (Netherlands)

== Goalscorers ==
There were 47 goals scored during the 20 games, an average of 2.35 goals per game.

5 goals

- (Spain) Manolo
- (Spain) Míchel

3 goals

- (Malta) Carmel Busuttil
- (Spain) Emilio Butragueño

2 goals

- (Hungary) Attila Pintér
- (Hungary) István Vincze
- (Republic of Ireland) John Aldridge
- (Republic of Ireland) Tony Cascarino
- (Republic of Ireland) Ray Houghton
- (Northern Ireland) Colin Clarke

1 goal

- (Hungary) Imre Boda
- (Hungary) György Bognár
- (Hungary) József Kiprich
- (Hungary) Kálmán Kovács
- (Republic of Ireland) Paul McGrath
- (Republic of Ireland) Kevin Moran
- (Republic of Ireland) Ronnie Whelan
- (Northern Ireland) Michael O'Neill
- (Northern Ireland) Steve Penney
- (Northern Ireland) Jimmy Quinn
- (Northern Ireland) Norman Whiteside
- (Spain) Genar Andrinúa
- (Spain) Txiki Begiristain
- (Spain) Fernando
- (Spain) Juanito
- (Spain) Julio Salinas

1 own goal

- (Northern Ireland) Alan McDonald (playing against Spain)
- (Northern Ireland) Anton Rogan (playing against Spain)
- (Spain) Míchel (playing against Ireland)
