= 1990 FIFA World Cup qualification – UEFA Group 2 =

Football tournament qualification stage

The 1990 FIFA World Cup qualification UEFA Group 2 was a UEFA qualifying group for the 1990 FIFA World Cup. The group comprised Albania, England, Poland and Sweden.

The group was won by Sweden, who qualified for the 1990 FIFA World Cup. England also qualified as one of the best runners-up.

== Standings ==
Pos	Team	Pld	W	D	L	GF	GA	GD	Pts	Qualification	Sweden men's national football team	England national football team	Poland national football team	Albania national football team
1	Sweden	6	4	2	0	9	3	+6	10	Qualification to 1990 FIFA World Cup	—	0–0	2–1	3–1
2	England	6	3	3	0	10	0	+10	9	Qualification to 1990 FIFA World Cup	0–0	—	3–0	5–0
3	Poland	6	2	1	3	4	8	−4	5		0–2	0–0	—	1–0
4	Albania	6	0	0	6	3	15	−12	0		1–2	0–2	1–2	—

=== Results ===
19 October 1988

England	0 – 0	Sweden
	(Report)

Wembley Stadium, London
Attendance: 65,628
Referee: Gérard Biguet (France)
19 October 1988

Poland	1 – 0	Albania
K. Warzycha 78'	(Report)

Silesian Stadium, Chorzów
Attendance: 35,000
Referee: Mircea Salomir (Romania)

5 November 1988

Albania	1 – 2	Sweden
Shehu 33'	(Report)	Holmqvist 68'; Ekström 71'

Qemal Stafa, Tirana
Attendance: 20,000
Referee: Yusuf Namoglou (Turkey)

8 March 1989

Albania	0 – 2	England
	(Report)	Barnes 16'; Robson 63'

Qemal Stafa, Tirana
Attendance: 30,000
Referee: John Blankenstein (Netherlands)

26 April 1989

England	5 – 0	Albania
Lineker 5'; Beardsley 12', 64'; Waddle 72'; Gascoigne 88'	(Report)

Wembley Stadium, London
Attendance: 60,602
Referee: Einar Halle (Norway)

7 May 1989

Sweden	2 – 1	Poland
Ljung 85'; N. Larsson 90'	(Report)	Tarasiewicz 87'

Råsunda Stadium, Stockholm
Attendance: 35,032
Referee: Kurt Röthlisberger (Switzerland)

3 June 1989

England	3 – 0	Poland
Lineker 23'; Barnes 72'; Webb 83'	(Report)

Wembley Stadium, London
Attendance: 69,203
Referee: Luigi Agnolin (Italy)

6 September 1989

Sweden	0 – 0	England
	(Report)

Råsunda Stadium, Stockholm
Attendance: 38,588
Referee: Hubert Forstinger (Austria)

8 October 1989

Sweden	3 – 1	Albania
Magnusson 20'; Ingesson 55'; Engqvist 89'	(Report)	Kushta 8' (pen.)

Råsunda Stadium, Stockholm
Attendance: 32,423
Referee: José Rosa dos Santos (Portugal)

11 October 1989

Poland	0 – 0	England
	(Report)

Silesian Stadium, Chorzów
Attendance: 32,423
Referee: Emilio Soriano Aladrén (Spain)

25 October 1989

Poland	0 – 2	Sweden
	(Report)	P. Larsson 34' (pen.); Ekström 60'

Silesian Stadium, Chorzów
Attendance: 12,000
Referee: Wieland Ziller (East Germany)

15 November 1989

Albania	1 – 2	Poland
Kushta 63'	(Report)	Tarasiewicz 45'; Ziober 85'

Qemal Stafa, Tirana
Attendance: 10,000
Referee: George Smith (Scotland)

== Goalscorers ==
There were 26 goals scored during the 12 games, an average of 2.17 goals per game.

2 goals

- (Albania) Sokol Kushta
- (England) John Barnes
- (England) Peter Beardsley
- (England) Gary Lineker
- (Poland) Ryszard Tarasiewicz
- (Sweden) Johnny Ekström

1 goal

- (Albania) Ylli Shehu
- (England) Paul Gascoigne
- (England) Bryan Robson
- (England) Chris Waddle
- (England) Neil Webb
- (Poland) Krzysztof Warzycha
- (Poland) Jacek Ziober
- (Sweden) Leif Engqvist
- (Sweden) Hans Holmqvist
- (Sweden) Klas Ingesson
- (Sweden) Niclas Larsson
- (Sweden) Peter Larsson
- (Sweden) Roger Ljung
- (Sweden) Mats Magnusson
