= 1990 FIFA World Cup qualification =

1990 FIFA World Cup Qualification
Tournament details
- Teams: 116 (from 6 confederations)

Tournament statistics
- Matches played: 314
- Goals scored: 735 (2.34 per match)
- Top scorer(s): (Belgium) Marc Van Der Linden (South Korea) Hwang Sun-hong (7 goals each)

The 1990 FIFA World Cup qualification was a series of tournaments organised by the six FIFA confederations. The 1990 FIFA World Cup featured 24 teams with one place reserved for the host nation, Italy, and one place for the defending champions, Argentina. The remaining 22 places were determined by a qualification process, in which 116 teams, from the six FIFA confederations, competed. Most of the successful teams were determined within these confederations, with a limited number of inter-confederation play-offs occurring at the end of the process.

The first qualification match was played on 17 April 1988 and qualification concluded on 19 November 1989. A total of 735 goals were scored in the 314 qualifying matches (an average of 2.34 per match).

== Entrants ==
At the close of entries on 30 September 1987, a total of 116 football associations had entered the 1990 World Cup. This entry figure was five lower than those who originally entered the previous tournament, a then-World Cup record of 121 entries.

Three entries were rejected by FIFA: Belize, Mauritius and Mozambique due to their outstanding financial debts, taking the number of accepted teams down to 113. With both the hosts and holders qualifying automatically for the finals, 111 nations were therefore scheduled to compete in the qualifying competitions. Gabon, Oman and Pakistan were making their first appearance in the World Cup.

Seven teams withdrew during the qualifying process without playing a match: Bahrain, India, Lesotho, Maldives, Rwanda, South Yemen and Togo. Mexico were disqualified from the CONCACAF qualifying tournament before playing a game for fielding overage players in the 1988 CONCACAF U-20 Tournament. Libya withdrew during the CAF group stage, but had already (successfully) played in the first round. Therefore, the total number of teams playing at least one fixture during the 1990 World Cup competition was 105 (103 during qualifying).

== Qualified teams ==
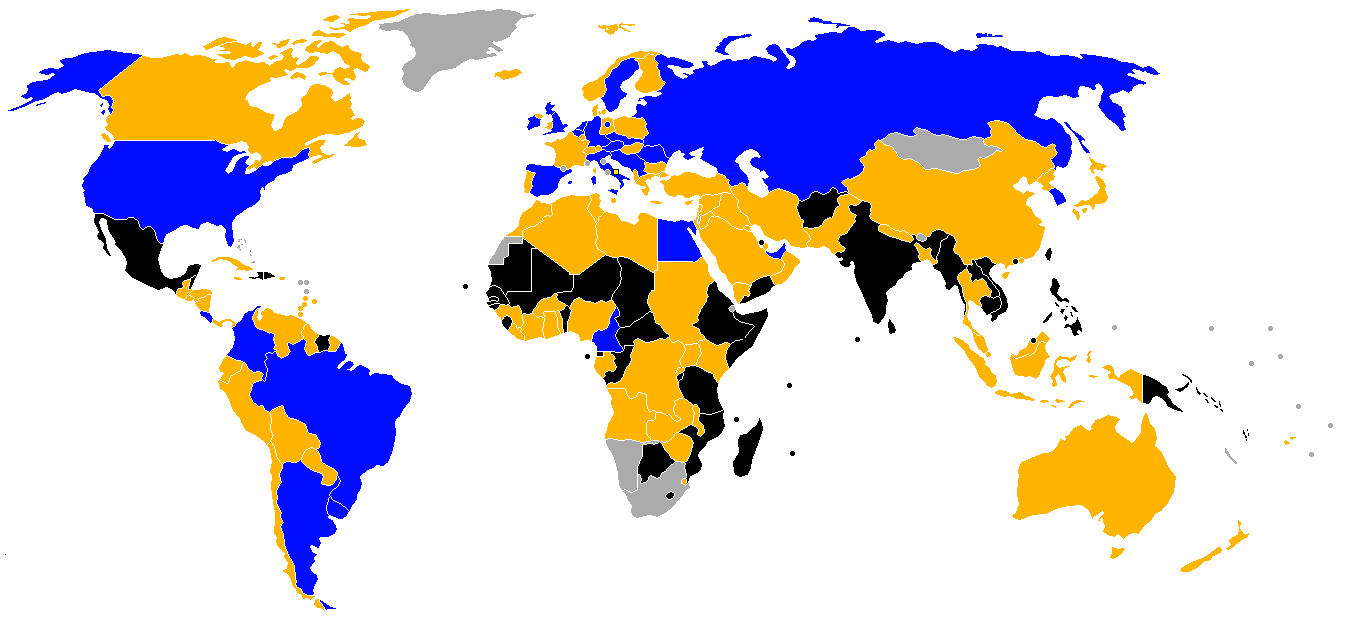
Country qualified for World Cup Country failed to qualify Country did not enter World Cup Country not a FIFA member

The following 24 teams qualified for the 1990 FIFA World Cup:

| Team | Method of qualification | Date of qualification | Finals appearance | Streak | Previous best performance |
|---|---|---|---|---|---|
| Argentina | Defending champions | 29 June 1986 | 10th | 5 | Winners (1978, 1986) |
| Austria | UEFA group 3 runners-up | 15 November 1989 | 6th | 1 (last: 1982) | Third place (1954) |
| Belgium | UEFA group 7 winners | 25 October 1989 | 8th | 3 | Fourth place (1986) |
| Brazil | CONMEBOL group 3 winners | 10 September 1989 | 14th | 14 | Winners (1958, 1962, 1970) |
| Cameroon | CAF final round winners | 19 November 1989 | 2nd | 1 (last: 1982) | Group stage (1982) |
| Colombia | CONMEBOL v OFC play-off winners | 30 October 1989 | 2nd | 1 (last: 1962) | Group stage (1962) |
| Costa Rica | CONCACAF Championship winners | 8 October 1989 | 1st | 1 | — |
| Czechoslovakia | UEFA group 7 runners-up | 15 November 1989 | 8th | 1 (last: 1982) | Runners-up (1934, 1962) |
| Egypt | CAF final round winners | 17 November 1989 | 2nd | 1 (last: 1934) | First round (1934) |
| England | UEFA group 2 runners-up | 11 October 1989 | 9th | 3 | Winners (1966) |
| Italy | Hosts | 19 May 1984 | 12th | 8 | Winners (1934, 1938, 1982) |
| South Korea | AFC final round winners | 25 October 1989 | 3rd | 2 | Group stage (1954, 1986) |
| Netherlands | UEFA group 4 winners | 15 November 1989 | 5th | 1 (last: 1978) | Runners-up (1974, 1978) |
| Republic of Ireland | UEFA group 6 runners-up | 15 November 1989 | 1st | 1 | – |
| Romania | UEFA group 1 winners | 15 November 1989 | 5th | 1 (last: 1970) | Group stage (1930, 1934, 1938, 1970) |
| Scotland | UEFA group 5 runners-up | 15 November 1989 | 7th | 5 | Group stage (1954, 1958, 1974, 1978, 1982, 1986) |
| Spain | UEFA group 6 winners | 11 October 1989 | 8th | 4 | Fourth place (1950) |
| Sweden | UEFA group 2 winners | 25 October 1989 | 8th | 1 (last: 1978) | Runners-up (1958) |
| United Arab Emirates | AFC final round runners-up | 28 October 1989 | 1st | 1 | — |
| United States | CONCACAF Championship runners-up | 19 November 1989 | 4th | 1 (last: 1950) | Third place (1930) |
| Uruguay | CONMEBOL group 2 winners | 24 September 1989 | 9th | 2 | Winners (1930, 1950) |
| Soviet Union | UEFA group 3 winners | 15 November 1989 | 7th | 3 | Fourth place (1966) |
| West Germany | UEFA group 4 runners-up | 15 November 1989 | 12th | 10 | Winners (1954, 1974) |
| Yugoslavia | UEFA group 5 winners | 11 October 1989 | 8th | 1 (last: 1982) | Fourth place (1930, 1962) |

== Confederation qualification ==
=== AFC ===
Qualification for AFC teams consisted of two rounds. Round one saw the teams divided into 6 groups, each team playing the others in their group twice. The winner of each group then went into a final group where they played each other once.

The qualification process began with 25 national teams vying for two spots. Korea Republic and United Arab Emirates qualified.

Legend
Countries that directly qualified for the 1990 World Cup

==== Final positions (final round) ====
| Rank | Team | Pld | Pts |
|---|---|---|---|
| 1 | South Korea | 5 | 8 |
| 2 | United Arab Emirates | 5 | 6 |
| 3 | Qatar | 5 | 5 |
| 4 | China | 5 | 4 |
| 5 | Saudi Arabia | 5 | 4 |
| 6 | North Korea | 5 | 3 |

=== CAF ===
Rwanda and Togo both withdrew. The remaining teams played playoff games on a home and away basis. The Winners advance to the group stage. Group stage, the 16 teams are divided into 4 groups of 4 teams. The winners advance to the final round. Final round, the 4 teams play playoff games on a home and away basis, the winners (Egypt and Cameroon) qualified.

| Team 1 | Agg. | Team 2 | 1st leg | 2nd leg |
|---|---|---|---|---|
| Algeria | 0–1 | Egypt | 0–0 | 0–1 |
| Cameroon | 3–0 | Tunisia | 2–0 | 1–0 |

=== CONCACAF ===
Qualification took place over three rounds, with the first two rounds being qualification for the CONCACAF Championship. In the first round, ten teams played in a two leg match with the five winners qualifying for the second round where they joined Canada, Honduras, El Salvador, United States and Mexico. Before the games, Mexico was disqualified for fielding over-age players at the 1988 CONCACAF U-20 Tournament which allowed Costa Rica a walkover. The remaining eight teams played playoff games against each other with the winners advancing to the final round.

In the final round, the five teams played each other on a home and away basis with the top two teams qualifying for the World Cup.

Legend
Countries that directly qualified for the 1990 World Cup

==== Final positions (final round) ====
| Rank | Team | Pld | Pts |
|---|---|---|---|
| 1 | Costa Rica | 8 | 11 |
| 2 | United States | 8 | 11 |
| 3 | Trinidad and Tobago | 8 | 9 |
| 4 | Guatemala | 6 | 3 |
| 5 | El Salvador | 6 | 2 |

=== CONMEBOL ===
The 9 teams are divided into 3 groups of 3 teams

Group 1 – Uruguay qualified.
Group 2 – Colombia advanced to the Intercontinental Play-off.
Group 3 – Brazil qualified.

=== OFC ===
Qualification for OFC teams consisted of two rounds. Four teams entered initially as they played in two home-and-away matches with the winners qualifying for the second round. They would be joined by Israel who had the bye in the first round with the three teams playing each other twice and the winner advancing to the intercontinental play-off against a CONMEBOL member. Israel won the group and advanced to the intercontinental play-off.

Legend
Countries that advanced to the OFC–CONMEBOL play-off

Second round
| Team | Pld | Pts |
|---|---|---|
| Israel | 4 | 5 |
| Australia | 4 | 4 |
| New Zealand | 4 | 3 |

Source: RSSSF

=== UEFA ===
The 32 teams are divided into 7 groups, 4 groups of 5 teams and 3 groups of 4 teams each.

Legend
Countries that directly qualified for the 1990 World Cup

==== Final positions (group stage) ====
Group 1
| Team | Pld | Pts |
|---|---|---|
| Romania | 6 | 9 |
| Denmark | 6 | 8 |
| Greece | 6 | 4 |
| Bulgaria | 6 | 3 |

Group 2
| Team | Pld | Pts |
|---|---|---|
| Sweden | 6 | 10 |
| England | 6 | 9 |
| Poland | 6 | 5 |
| Albania | 6 | 0 |

Group 3
| Team | Pld | Pts |
|---|---|---|
| Soviet Union | 8 | 11 |
| Austria | 8 | 9 |
| Turkey | 8 | 7 |
| East Germany | 8 | 7 |
| Iceland | 8 | 6 |

Group 4
| Team | Pld | Pts |
|---|---|---|
| Netherlands | 6 | 10 |
| West Germany | 6 | 9 |
| Finland | 6 | 3 |
| Wales | 6 | 2 |

Group 5
| Team | Pld | Pts |
|---|---|---|
| Yugoslavia | 8 | 14 |
| Scotland | 8 | 10 |
| France | 8 | 9 |
| Norway | 8 | 6 |
| Cyprus | 8 | 1 |

Group 6
| Team | Pld | Pts |
|---|---|---|
| Spain | 8 | 13 |
| Republic of Ireland | 8 | 12 |
| Hungary | 8 | 8 |
| Northern Ireland | 8 | 5 |
| Malta | 8 | 2 |

Group 7
| Team | Pld | Pts |
|---|---|---|
| Belgium | 8 | 12 |
| Czechoslovakia | 8 | 12 |
| Portugal | 8 | 10 |
| Switzerland | 8 | 5 |
| Luxembourg | 8 | 1 |

== Inter-confederation play-offs: CONMEBOL v OFC ==
The winning team of the OFC qualification tournament played the CONMEBOL group winner with the weakest record in a home-and-away play-off. The winner of this play-off qualified for the 1990 FIFA World Cup.

| Team 1 | Agg. | Team 2 | 1st leg | 2nd leg |
|---|---|---|---|---|
| Colombia | 1–0 | Israel | 1–0 | 0–0 |

== Top goalscorers ==
7 goals

- (Belgium) Marc Van Der Linden
- (South Korea) Hwang Sun-hong

6 goals

- (China) Ma Lin
- (Iraq) Ahmed Radhi
- (Qatar) Mahmoud Yaseen Al-Soufi
- (Scotland) Mo Johnston

== Notes ==
- On 12 August 1989, Samuel Okwaraji collapsed and died whilst playing for Nigeria in their qualifying match against Angola, ten minutes before the end.
- One of the most bizarre incidents in World Cup history occurred on 3 September 1989. During the Brazil vs Chile CONMEBOL qualifying match in Rio de Janeiro, Chile needed victory to retain any hope of qualification, but trailed 0–1 to Brazil. Around twenty minutes into the second half, Chilean goalkeeper Roberto "Cóndor" Rojas fell to the pitch with an apparent injury to his forehead. A firework, thrown from the stands by a Brazilian fan named Rosenery Mello do Nascimento, was smouldering about some yards away. After carrying Rojas off the pitch, the Chilean players and coaches refused to return claiming conditions were not safe, and the match went unfinished. After studying video footage of the match showing that the firework had not made any contact with Rojas, FIFA awarded Brazil a 2–0 win, eliminating Chile from the 1990 World Cup. As punishment, Chile were barred from the qualifying process for the 1994 FIFA World Cup, and Roberto Rojas was banned for life (subsequently lifted in 2001) for his role in falsifying the story simulating an attack by the Brazilian fans. The incident is called the Maracanazo by the Chile national team since it took place in the Maracanã Stadium.
- The decisive second leg of the CAF final round, tie between Egypt and Algeria in Cairo saw ugly scenes at its conclusion. The game was won 1–0 by Egypt, sending them to the 1990 World Cup at the expense of their opponent. After the final whistle, Algerian players and officials mobbed the referee and threw plant pots into the crowd. At the post-game conference, the Egyptian team doctor was blinded in one eye after being hit with a broken bottle thrown by an Algerian player. This was believed to be star striker Lakhdar Belloumi who was sentenced to prison for this offense, but he denied any wrongdoing and a twenty-year international arrest warrant was eventually quashed in 2009. Teammates had previously testified that reserve goalkeeper Kamel Kadri was instead the culprit.
- In the last game of the CONCACAF classification on November 19, 1989, United States played against Trinidad and Tobago in Port of Spain, both played for the last ticket to represent CONCACAF together with Costa Rica in the World Cup. The United States were third, they needed a win, while Trinidad and Tobago, who were in second, also needed a win or a draw, since they qualified for the first time in their history, both had 9 points, the Soca warriors were on goal difference plus 3, in the game Paul Caligiuri of the United States would score the only goal of the game giving the Americans qualification for the Soccer World Cup after 40 years of absence, Caligiuri's goal was dubbed Shot heard round the world, The Yankees rose to second place with 11 points, the same as Costa Rica's, which won the CONCACAF Championship.
- Mexico did not participate in the CONCACAF qualification due to an improper line-up in the qualifying round for the 1989 FIFA World Youth Championship, where 4 players were over the allowed age. Initially, the sanction was only going to be for the U-20 team, but the intransigence and contempt of the Mexican managers against FIFA influenced the sanction to be extended to all national representatives for 2 years, this incident is known as Cachirules.
