= Ryszard Tarasiewicz =

Polish footballer and manager

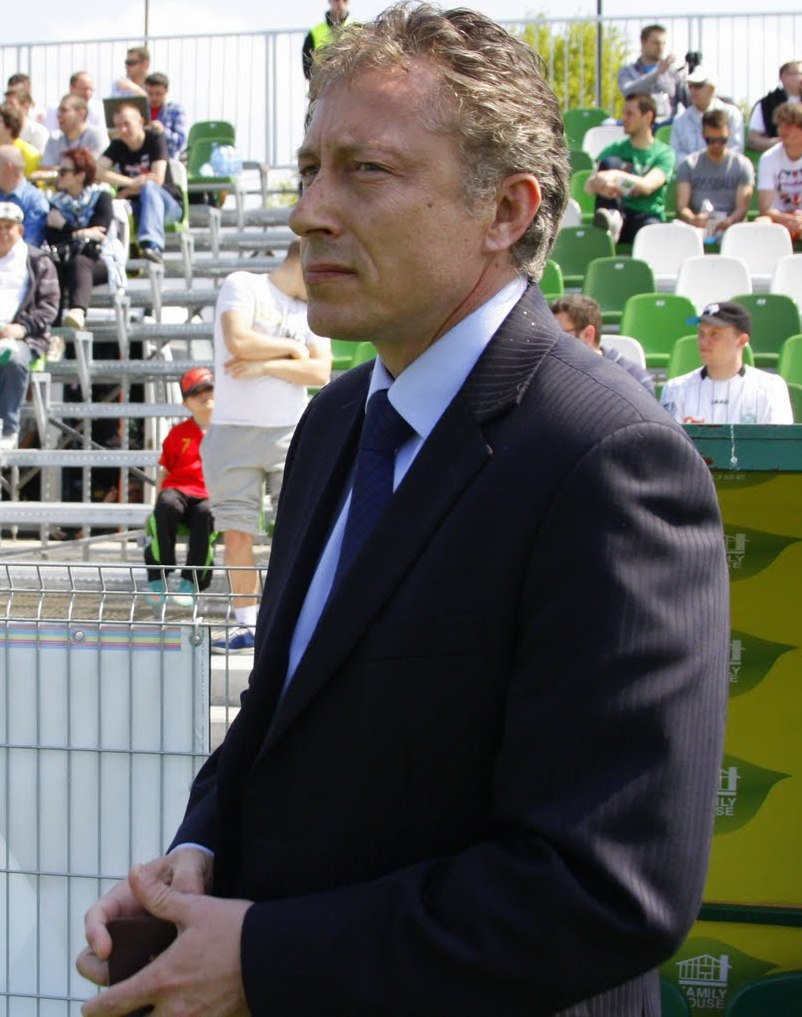
- Tarasiewicz in 2013 with Zawisza Bydgoszcz

Personal information
- Full name: Ryszard Jerzy Tarasiewicz
- Date of birth: 27 April 1962 (age 64)
- Place of birth: Wrocław, Poland
- Height: 1.77 m (5 ft 9 1/2 in)
- Position: Midfielder

Senior career*
Years	Team	Apps	(Gls)
1979–1989	Śląsk Wrocław	214	(56)
1989–1990	Neuchâtel Xamax	30	(11)
1990–1992	Nancy	54	(15)
1992–1994	Lens	0	(0)
1994–1995	Besançon	22	(2)
1995–1996	Etoile Carouge	12	(2)
1997	Sarpsborg	3	(1)
Total		335	(87)

International career
- Poland U18
1984–1991	Poland	58	(9)

Managerial career
- 2004–2006: Śląsk Wrocław
- 2006–2007: Jagiellonia Białystok
- 2007–2010: Śląsk Wrocław
- 2011–2012: ŁKS Łódź
- 2012: Pogoń Szczecin
- 2013–2014: Zawisza Bydgoszcz
- 2014–2015: Korona Kielce
- 2015–2017: Miedź Legnica
- 2017–2020: GKS Tychy
- 2021–2022: Arka Gdynia
- 2024–2025: Kotwica Kołobrzeg
- 2025: Warta Poznań
Medal record
Men's football
Representing Poland
UEFA European Under-18 Championship
Runner-up	1980 East Germany
- * Club domestic league appearances and goals

Ryszard Jerzy Tarasiewicz (born 27 April 1962) is a Polish professional football manager and former player who was most recently in charge of Warta Poznań. In 1989, he won the Polish Footballer of the Year plebiscite organized by the Piłka Nożna football weekly.

== Career ==
=== Club ===
After playing 10 years for Śląsk Wrocław, he left Poland in 1989 and played for Swiss club Neuchâtel Xamax and French sides AS Nancy, RC Lens and Besançon RC.

=== National team ===
He played for the Poland national team and was a participant of the 1986 FIFA World Cup.

== Managerial career ==
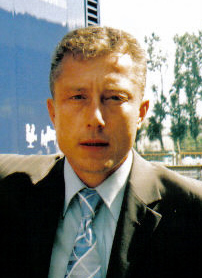
Tarasiewicz in 2007

Just like his active career, Tarasiewicz started his managing career at Śląsk Wrocław. After 2 years, where he led the club to the II liga, he resigned due to conflicts with the club's then president Edward Ptak.

He went on to coach Jagiellonia Białystok, but was dismissed before the end of the season due to poor results.

On 19 June 2007, he yet again signed a contract with Śląsk Wrocław. In 2008, he led the club back to the highest Polish football league, the Ekstraklasa, making him the first manager in the club's history, who promoted twice with his team. On 22 September 2010, he was dismissed from his position due to a poor start to the 2010–11 Ekstraklasa season.

On 7 November 2011, he signed a contract with ŁKS Łódź.

== Career statistics ==
=== International ===
Appearances and goals by national team and year
National team	Year	Apps	Goals
Poland	1984	3	1
Poland	1985	7	0
Poland	1986	7	1
Poland	1987	9	2
Poland	1988	9	1
Poland	1989	11	3
Poland	1990	6	0
Poland	1991	6	1
Total		58	9

Scores and results list Poland's goal tally first, score column indicates score after each Tarasiewicz goal.

List of international goals scored by Ryszard Tarasiewicz
No.	Date	Venue	Opponent	Score	Result	Competition	Ref.
1	29 August 1984	Marienlyst Stadion, Drammen, Norway	Norway	1–0	1–1	Friendly	
2	7 October 1986	Zdzisław Krzyszkowiak Municipal Stadium, Bydgoszcz, Poland	North Korea	1–0	2–2	Friendly	
3	23 September 1987	Polish Army Stadium, Warsaw, Poland	Hungary	2–1	3–2	UEFA Euro 1988 qualifying	
4	27 October 1987	Tehelné pole, Bratislava, Czechoslovakia	Czechoslovakia	1–2	1–3	Friendly	
5	15 July 1988	Varsity Stadium, Toronto, Canada	Canada	2–0	2–1	Friendly	
6	12 April 1989	Polish Army Stadium, Warsaw, Poland	Romania	2–1	2–1	Friendly	
7	7 May 1989	Råsunda Stadium, Stockholm, Sweden	Sweden	1–1	1–2	1990 FIFA World Cup qualification	
8	15 November 1989	Arena Kombëtare, Tirana, Albania	Albania	1–0	2–1	1990 FIFA World Cup qualification	
9	17 April 1991	Polish Army Stadium, Warsaw, Poland	Turkey	1–0	3–0	UEFA Euro 1992 qualifying	

== Managerial statistics ==
As of match played 25 May 2025

Managerial record by team and tenure
Team	From	To	Record							
Team	From	To	G	W	D	L	GF	GA	GD	Win %
Śląsk Wrocław	29 September 2004	28 June 2006	60	31	15	14	84	54	+30	51.67
Jagiellonia Białystok	29 June 2006	25 April 2007	27	13	6	8	42	28	+14	48.15
Śląsk Wrocław	19 June 2007	22 September 2010	116	47	38	31	156	121	+35	40.52
ŁKS Łódź	7 November 2011	31 January 2012	4	0	1	3	2	11	−9	0.00
Pogoń Szczecin	10 April 2012	6 June 2012	10	5	2	3	13	8	+5	50.00
Zawisza Bydgoszcz	27 April 2013	3 June 2014	54	25	14	15	83	56	+27	46.30
Korona Kielce	17 June 2014	10 June 2015	38	12	11	15	45	57	−12	31.58
Miedź Legnica	24 August 2015	5 June 2017	66	29	20	17	89	56	+33	43.94
GKS Tychy	10 October 2017	8 March 2020	82	35	23	24	125	101	+24	42.68
Arka Gdynia	19 October 2021	14 November 2022	44	23	7	14	75	56	+19	52.27
Kotwica Kołobrzeg	12 April 2024	10 January 2025	29	10	6	13	31	43	−12	34.48
Warta Poznań	10 March 2025	10 June 2025	11	1	1	9	6	18	−12	9.09
Total			541	231	144	166	751	609	+142	42.70

== Honours ==
=== Player ===
Śląsk Wrocław

- Polish Cup: 1986–87

Poland U18

- UEFA European Under-18 Championship runner-up: 1980

Individual

- Piłka Nożna Polish Footballer of the Year: 1989

=== Manager ===
Śląsk Wrocław

- III liga, group III: 2004–05
- Ekstraklasa Cup: 2008–09

Zawisza Bydgoszcz

- I liga: 2012–13
- Polish Cup: 2013–14
