= Klas Ingesson =

Swedish footballer and manager (1968-2014)

- Ingesson playing football for the Sweden national team

Personal information
- Full name: Klas Inge Ingesson
- Date of birth: 20 August 1968
- Place of birth: Ödeshög, Sweden
- Date of death: 29 October 2014 (aged 46)
- Place of death: Ödeshög, Sweden
- Height: 1.90 m (6 ft 3 in)
- Position: Midfielder

Youth career
- 1975–1986: Ödeshögs IK

Senior career*
Years	Team	Apps	(Gls)
1986–1990	IFK Göteborg	53	(9)
1990–1993	K.V. Mechelen	99	(28)
1993–1994	PSV Eindhoven	12	(1)
1994–1995	Sheffield Wednesday	18	(2)
1995–1998	Bari	56	(5)
1998–2000	Bologna	64	(4)
2000–2001	Marseille	13	(0)
2001	Lecce	19	(1)
Total		371	(56)

International career
1988	Sweden U21	4	(2)
1989–1998	Sweden	57	(13)

Managerial career
- 2013–2014: IF Elfsborg
Medal record
Sweden
FIFA World Cup
Bronze medal – third place	1994
- * Club domestic league appearances and goals

Klas Inge "Klabbe" Ingesson (20 August 1968 – 29 October 2014) was a Swedish professional footballer and manager. He spent most of his career as a midfielder in Sweden, Belgium, Netherlands, England, Italy and France. Ingesson represented the Sweden national team on 57 occasions, including the 1990 and 1994 FIFA World Cups, as well as the 1992 European Championship. He was the manager of IF Elfsborg from 2013 until his death in October 2014.

== Playing career ==
He played for IFK Göteborg in Sweden, K.V. Mechelen in Belgium, PSV Eindhoven in the Netherlands, Sheffield Wednesday in England, Bari, Bologna and Lecce in Italy, and Marseille in France.

At Sheffield Wednesday, he encountered players "who went straight to the pub after training but still able to run like wild animals come Saturday". Manager Trevor Francis recruited him to replace Carlton Palmer, but Ingesson only played in 18 games (plus three in the domestic cups). He scored two goals for Sheffield Wednesday, one against Everton 26 December 1994 and one against Arsenal 4 February 1995. Ingesson later suffered groin injuries and after Francis was replaced by new manager David Pleat, Ingesson was dropped from the starting 11. In November 1995 Ingesson was sold to Bari in Italy.

== Coaching career ==
On 30 September 2013, Ingesson was appointed manager of IF Elfsborg.

== Personal life ==
After retiring from playing Ingesson became a lumberjack, and also appeared as a presenter on the Swedish TV programme Farlig Fritid ("Dangerous Leisures").

On 14 May 2009, Ingesson announced that he had been diagnosed with multiple myeloma. The treatment was at the start said to be going "in the right direction". Ingesson fully recovered and, in December 2010, made a football comeback by accepting an offer to guide the IF Elfsborg under-21 youth team. On 8 January 2013, Ingesson revealed that the myeloma had returned, and that he would have a stem cell transplant, as the two previous autologous (i.e. of his own stem cells) transplants had been unsuccessful.

On 29 October 2014, Ingesson died of the effects of multiple myeloma. He was married and had two children.

== Career statistics ==
=== International ===
Appearances and goals by national team and year

National team	Year	Apps	Goals
Sweden	1989	6	3
Sweden	1990	9	3
Sweden	1991	4	0
Sweden	1992	11	3
Sweden	1993	8	0
Sweden	1994	13	3
Sweden	1995	1	0
Sweden	1996	4	1
Sweden	1997	0	0
Sweden	1998	1	0
Total		57	13

International goals

Scores and results list Sweden's goal tally first.

#	Date	Venue	Opponent	Score	Result	Competition
1.	31 May 1989	Eyravallen, Örebro, Sweden	Algeria	1–0	2–0	Friendly
2.	31 May 1989	Eyravallen, Örebro, Sweden	Algeria	2–0	2–0	Friendly
3.	8 October 1989	Råsunda Stadium, Stockholm, Sweden	Albania	2–1	3–1	1990 FIFA World Cup qualifier
4.	16 February 1990	Al-Maktoum Stadium, Dubai, United Arab Emirates	United Arab Emirates	2–0	2–0	Friendly
5.	25 April 1990	Råsunda Stadium, Stockholm, Sweden	Wales	3–1	4–2	Friendly
6.	25 April 1990	Råsunda Stadium, Stockholm, Sweden	Wales	4–2	4–2	Friendly
7.	7 May 1992	Råsunda Stadium, Stockholm, Sweden	Poland	3–0	5–0	Friendly
8.	9 September 1992	Helsinki Olympic Stadium, Helsinki, Finland	Finland	1–0	1–0	1994 FIFA World Cup qualifier
9.	11 November 1992	Ramat Gan Stadium, Ramat Gan, Israel	Israel	3–1	3–1	1994 FIFA World Cup qualifier
10.	4 May 1994	Råsunda Stadium, Stockholm, Sweden	Nigeria	3–1	3–1	Friendly
11.	12 June 1994	Trabuco Hills High School Stadium, Mission Viejo, United States	Romania	1–0	1–1	Friendly
12.	7 September 1994	Laugardalsvöllur, Reykjavík, Iceland	Iceland	1–0	1–0	UEFA Euro 1996 qualifier
13.	24 April 1996	Windsor Park, Belfast, Northern Ireland	Northern Ireland	2–0	2–1	Friendly

== Managerial statistics ==
Team	From	To	Record				
Team	From	To	G	W	D	L	Win %
IF Elfsborg	30 September 2013	29 October 2014	52	27	10	15	51.92
Total			52	27	10	15	51.92

== Honours ==
IFK Göteborg

- UEFA Cup: 1986–87
- Allsvenskan: 1990
- Swedish Champions: 1987, 1990

Bologna

- UEFA Intertoto Cup: 1998

Sweden

- FIFA World Cup third place: 1994
