= Kalin Bankov =

Bulgarian footballer

Personal information
- Date of birth: 12 May 1965 (age 61)
- Place of birth: Sofia, Bulgaria
- Height: 6 ft 0 in (1.83 m)
- Position: Defender

Senior career*
Years	Team	Apps	(Gls)
1984–1988	Levski Sofia	31	(1)
1988–1990	Etar Veliko Tarnovo	55	(8)
1990–1992	Levski Sofia	26	(0)
1992–1993	Slavia Sofia	6	(1)
1994	CSKA Sofia	8	(0)
1995–1996	Akademik Sofia		
1996–1998	Minyor Pernik	29	(2)
1998	Nashville Metros	25	(6)
1999	Minnesota Thunder	25	(1)
2000–2001	Tampa Bay Mutiny	19	(1)
2001	Rochester Rhinos	7	(0)
2001	Minnesota Thunder	10	(1)
2002	Rochester Rhinos	26	(1)
Total		267	(22)

International career
1989–1990	Bulgaria	7	(1)
- * Club domestic league appearances and goals

Kalin Bankov (Bulgarian: Калин Банков; born 12 May 1965) is a former Bulgarian professional footballer who played as a defender in Bulgaria and the United States.

== Career ==
Born in Sofia, Bankov played for Levski Sofia, Etar Veliko Tarnovo, Slavia Sofia, CSKA Sofia, Minyor Pernik, the Nashville Metros, the Minnesota Thunder, the Tampa Bay Mutiny and the Rochester Rhinos.

Bankov also earned seven caps for the Bulgaria national team during a two-year international career.
