= Hans Holmqvist =

Swedish footballer and commentator

Personal information
- Full name: Hans-Olof Holmqvist
- Date of birth: 27 April 1960 (age 66)
- Place of birth: Stockholm, Sweden
- Position: Forward

Senior career*
Years	Team	Apps	(Gls)
1979–1983	Djurgårdens IF	86	(37)
1984	Hammarby IF	14	(3)
1984–1986	Fortuna Düsseldorf	59	(19)
1986–1987	Hammarby IF	22	(1)
1987–1988	Young Boys	28	(10)
1988–1990	Cesena	20	(1)
1991–1992	Örebro SK	36	(7)
Total		265	(78)

International career
1977	Sweden U19	3	(0)
1980–1981	Sweden U21	8	(1)
1983–1988	Sweden	27	(4)
- * Club domestic league appearances and goals

Hans-Olof "Hasse" Holmqvist (27 April 1960) is a Swedish former professional footballer who played as a forward. He represented Djurgårdens IF, Hammarby IF, Fortuna Düsseldorf, Young Boys, Cesena, and Örebro SK during a career that spanned between 1979 and 1992. A full international between 1983 and 1988, he won 27 caps and scored four goals for the Sweden national team.

== Career statistics ==
Appearances and goals by national team and year
National team	Year	Apps	Goals
Sweden	1983	2	0
Sweden	1984	7	0
Sweden	1985	4	0
Sweden	1986	3	0
Sweden	1987	3	0
Sweden	1988	8	4
Total		27	4

Scores and results list Sweden's goal tally first, score column indicates score after each Holmqvist goal.

List of international goals scored by Hans Holmqvist
No.	Date	Venue	Opponent	Score	Result	Competition	Ref.
1	2 April 1988	Olympic Stadium, Moscow, Russia	Soviet Union	1–0	2–0	1988 Four Nations Tournament	
2	27 April 1988	Råsunda Stadium, Solna, Sweden	Wales	1–0	4–1	Friendly	
3	27 April 1988	Råsunda Stadium, Solna, Sweden	Wales	3–1	4–1	Friendly	
4	5 November 1988	Qemal Stafa Stadium, Tirana, Albania	Albania	1–1	2–1	1990 FIFA World Cup qualification	

== Honours ==
Djurgårdens IF

- Division 2 Norra: 1982

Individual

- Stor Grabb: 1987
