= István Vincze =

Hungarian footballer and manager

Personal information
- Full name: István Vincze
- Date of birth: 22 January 1967 (age 59)
- Place of birth: Tatabánya, Hungary
- Height: 1.77 m (5 ft 9 1/2 in)
- Position: Striker

Youth career
- 1976–1984: Tatabányai Bányász

Senior career*
Years	Team	Apps	(Gls)
1984–1988	Tatabányai Bányász	109	(38)
1988–1990	Lecce	45	(4)
1990–1994	Kispest Honvéd	95	(22)
1994–1996	BVSC Budapest	47	(13)
1996–1997	Germinal Ekeren	1	(0)
1997–1999	Campomaiorense	33	(1)
1999	Santa Clara	8	(6)
1999–2001	Tatabánya	41	(19)
2001	Pécsi Mecsek	10	(1)
2002	Vasas	6	(0)
Total		395	(104)

International career
1986–1996	Hungary	44	(8)

Managerial career
- 2016: Puskás Akadémia
- 2016–2017: Csákvári TK
- 2022-: KFC Komárno (Assistant)
- * Club domestic league appearances and goals

István Vincze (born 22 January 1967) is a Hungarian football manager and former football player.

He made his debut for the Hungary national team in 1986, and got 44 caps and 8 goals until 1996.

He played domestically for Tatabányai Bányász SC, Kispest Honvéd FC, BVSC Budapest, FC Tatabánya, Pécsi Mecsek and Vasas SC, as well as for Italian club U.S. Lecce, Belgian club Germinal Ekeren and Portuguese clubs S.C. Campomaiorense and C.D. Santa Clara.
