= Peter Larsson (footballer, born 1961) =

Swedish footballer

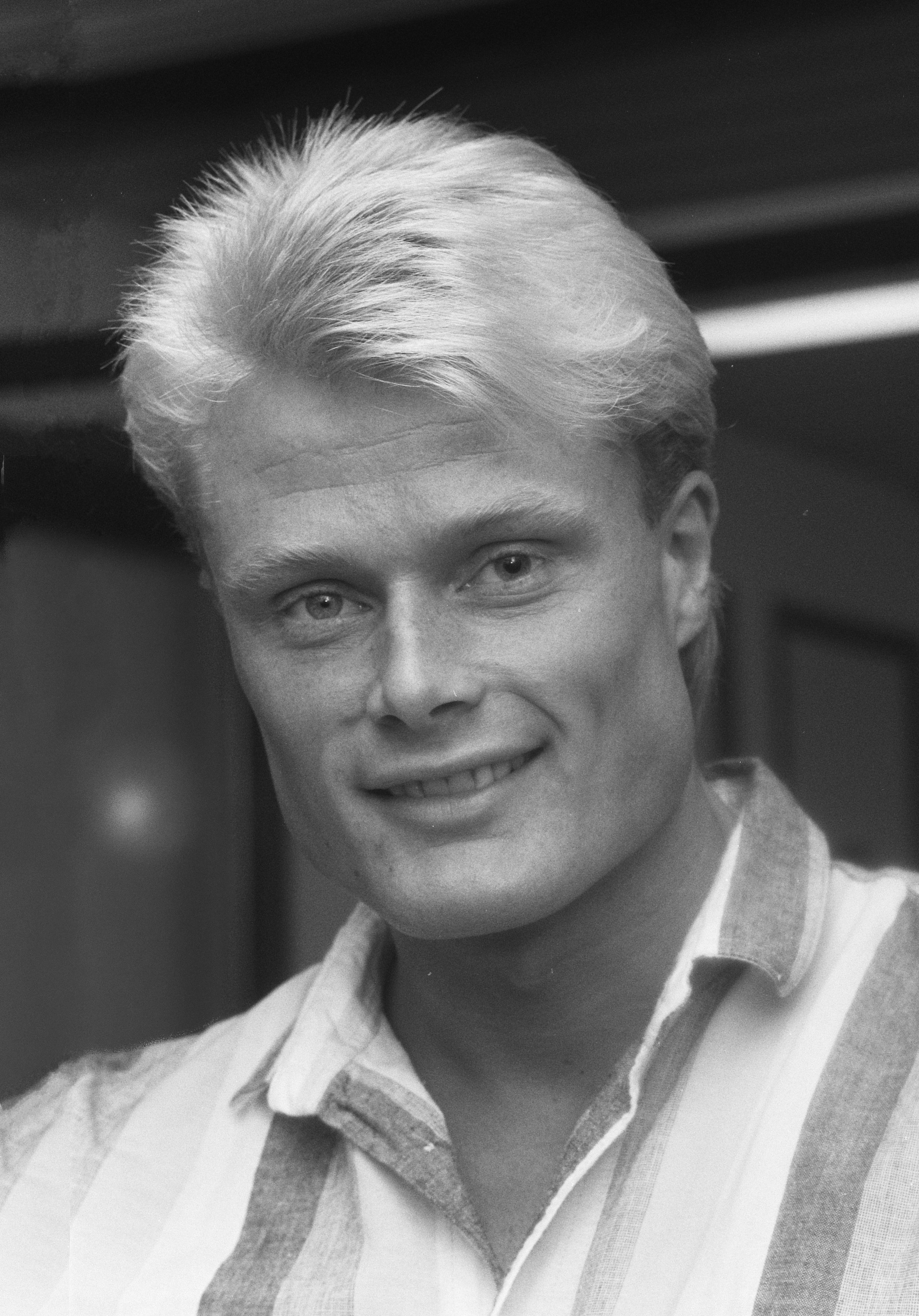
- Peter Larsson in December 1987

Personal information
- Full name: Peter Nils-Gösta Larsson.
- Date of birth: 8 March 1961 (age 65)
- Place of birth: Torsby, Sweden
- Height: 1.83 m (6 ft 0 in)
- Position: Defender

Youth career
- 1971–1977: IF Hallby

Senior career*
Years	Team	Apps	(Gls)
1977–1981	IF Hallby	86	(25)
1982–1983	Halmstads BK	44	(6)
1984–1987	IFK Göteborg	86	(8)
1987–1991	Ajax	58	(4)
1991–1993	AIK	76	(0)
1994	Korsnäs IF		
1997–1998	Falu BS		

International career
1983–1986	Sweden U21	9	(3)
1983–1992	Sweden	47	(4)

Managerial career
- 1995: Korsnäs IF
- 1996–1997: Falu BS
- 2002: AIK
- * Club domestic league appearances and goals

Peter Nils-Gösta Larsson (born 8 March 1961) is a Swedish former professional footballer who played as a centre-back.

He represented Halmstads BK, IFK Göteborg, Ajax, and AIK during a professional career that spanned between 1982 and 1993. A full international between 1983 and 1992, he won 47 caps and scored four goals for the Sweden national team and represented his country at the 1990 FIFA World Cup.

In 1987, he was awarded Guldbollen as Sweden's best footballer of the year.

== Club career ==
Larsson began his career in IF Hallby in Jönköping 1971–81. Later he played for Halmstads BK in Allsvenskan, after that he had a successful career at IFK Göteborg, where he won the Allsvenskan title three times, and also won the UEFA Cup in 1987. He turned professional with AFC Ajax 1987–91. After that he played for AIK and became Swedish champion again in 1992.

== International career ==
Larsson made 47 appearances for the Sweden men's national football team and scored four goals. He was a part of the squad for the 1990 FIFA World Cup.

== Managerial career ==
In 2001, Larsson became assistant coach for AIK in Allsvenskan, working under his former national team coach Olle Nordin, and when Nordin left the coach job due to illness shortly before the 2002 season, Larsson became head coach. His career however became short – after seven games with only one win, Larsson decided to quit. Ha hasn't returned to high level football thereafter.

== Career statistics ==
=== International ===
Appearances and goals by national team and year
National team	Year	Apps	Goals
Sweden	1983	2	0
Sweden	1984	1	0
Sweden	1985	2	0
Sweden	1986	8	0
Sweden	1987	8	2
Sweden	1988	7	0
Sweden	1989	4	1
Sweden	1990	8	1
Sweden	1991	6	0
Sweden	1992	1	0
Total		47	4

International goals

Scores and results list Sweden's goal tally first.

#	Date	Venue	Opponent	Score	Result	Competition
1.	3 June 1987	Råsunda Stadium, Solna, Sweden	Italy	1–0	1–0	UEFA Euro 1988 qualifier
2.	14 November 1987	Stadio San Paolo, Naples, Italy	Italy	1–1	1–2	UEFA Euro 1988 qualifier
3.	25 October 1989	Stadion Śląski, Chorzów, Poland	Poland	1–0	2–0	1990 FIFA World Cup qualifier
4.	27 May 1990	Råsunda Stadium, Solna, Sweden	Finland	5–0	6–0	Friendly

== Honours ==
IFK Göteborg

- UEFA Cup: 1986–87
- Swedish Champion: 1984, 1987

Ajax

- Eredivisie: 1989–90

AIK

- Swedish Champion: 1992

Individual

- Guldbollen: 1987
- Stor Grabb: 1987
