= Jacek Ziober =

Polish footballer (1965–2026)

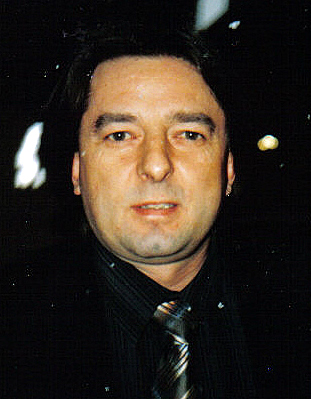

Personal information
- Date of birth: 18 November 1965
- Place of birth: Łódź, Poland
- Date of death: 6 October 2026 (aged 60)
- Height: 1.72 m (5 ft 8 in)
- Position: Forward

Senior career*
Years	Team	Apps	(Gls)
1982–1990	ŁKS Łódź	203	(26)
1990–1993	Montpellier	93	(18)
1993–1996	Osasuna	61	(15)
1997	Amica Wronki	15	(5)
1998	Tampa Bay Mutiny	3	(0)

International career
- Poland U18
1988–1993	Poland	46	(8)
Medal record
Men's football
Representing Poland
UEFA European Under-18 Championship
Third place	1984 Soviet Union
- * Club domestic league appearances and goals

Jacek Ziober (18 November 1965 – 6 October 2026) was a Polish professional footballer who played as a forward.

== Club career ==
Ziober was linked to his hometown city of Łódź throughout his life, and in particular to his boyhood club ŁKS Łódź.

He competed in the 1990–91 European Cup Winners' Cup with Montpellier, losing in the quarterfinals to Manchester United. In 1993, he moved to Osasuna, but after one season the team was relegated to the Segunda División.

In 1996, Ziober returned to Poland to play for Amica Wronki.

== International career ==
In the years 1989 to 1993, he was a key player of Poland national football team.

Since the Poland national team failed to qualify to any major tournament in the 1990s, Ziober never played at a major senior international tournament. His greatest international success remains winning the bronze medal at the 1984 UEFA Euro U-18. In 1990, he won the Polish Footballer of the Year plebiscite organized by the Piłka Nożna football weekly.

== Death ==
Ziober died on 6 October 2026, at the age of 60.

== Career statistics ==
=== International ===
Appearances and goals by year
National team	Year	Apps	Goals
Poland	1988	7	0
Poland	1989	8	2
Poland	1990	15	5
Poland	1991	6	1
Poland	1992	3	0
Poland	1993	7	0
Total		46	8

== Honours ==
Montpellier

- Coupe de la Ligue: 1991–92

Poland U18

- UEFA European Under-18 Championship third place: 1984

Individual

- Piłka Nożna Polish Footballer of the Year: 1990
