= Steve Penney (footballer) =

Northern Irish footballer

Personal information
- Full name: Steven Alexander Penney
- Date of birth: 6 January 1964 (age 62)
- Place of birth: Ballymena, Northern Ireland
- Height: 5 ft 9 in (1.75 m)
- Position: Winger

Youth career
- Linfield

Senior career*
Years	Team	Apps	(Gls)
1981–1983	Ballymena United		
1983–1991	Brighton & Hove Albion	138	(14)
1991–1992	Heart of Midlothian	9	(0)
1992–1994	Burnley	11	(3)

International career
1984–1988	Northern Ireland	17	(2)
- * Club domestic league appearances and goals

Steven Alexander Penney (born 6 January 1964) is a Northern Ireland former international footballer who played as a right winger.

Penney started his career with hometown Ballymena United, before moving to England with Brighton & Hove Albion in 1983. Penney spent 8 seasons playing for Brighton in the second and third tier of English football before a single season cameo with Heart of Midlothian in 1991–92. After a similarly short spell with Burnley, a serious knee injury forced him into early retirement.

He was capped 17 times by Northern Ireland, earning selection for the 1986 World Cup squad in Mexico.
