= José Rosa dos Santos =

Portuguese football referee

- Born: 29 June 1945 (age 81); Beja, Portugal

Domestic
Years	League	Role
1982–1992	Primeira Liga	Referee

International
Years	League	Role
1984–1992	FIFA-listed	Referee

José Rosa dos Santos (born 29 June 1945 in Beja) is a former Portuguese football referee. He refereed two matches in the UEFA European Football Championship, one in the 1988 tournament and one in the 1992 tournament.
