= Marcel Van Langenhove (referee) =

Belgian politician and football referee

- Born: 16 April 1944 (age 81); Wemmel, Belgium
- Occupations: politician, referee

Marcel Van Langenhove (born 16 April 1944) is a Belgian politician and a former football referee.

He refereed one game at the 1990 FIFA World Cup, between Ireland and Egypt.

He was the mayor of his native city of Wemmel from 2001 until 2010.
