= Luxembourg national football team results (1980–1999) =

- Win Draw Loss

This is a list of the Luxembourg national football team results from 1980 to 1999.

== 1980s ==
=== 1980 ===
27 February 1980 Friendly	Belgium	5–0	Luxembourg	Brussels, Belgium
	Vandenbergh 12', 21'; Vandereycken 16'; Van der Elst 66', 89'	Report		Stadium: Stade du Heysel; Attendance: 1,226; Referee: Henk van Ettekoven (Netherlands)

26 March 1980 Friendly	Luxembourg	0–1	Uruguay	Esch-sur-Alzette, Luxembourg
		Report	Victorino 69'	Stadium: Stade de la Frontière; Attendance: 1,500; Referee: Walter Eschweiler, (West Germany)

1 May 1980 1980 Marah Halim Cup R1	Thailand	0–1	Luxembourg	Medan, Indonesia
	Tantadipolok (red card)	Report	Clemens 84'	Stadium: Teladan Stadium; Referee: H. van Dijk (Netherlands)

9 May 1980 1980 Marah Halim Cup R1	Luxembourg	3–2	South Korea	Medan, Indonesia
	Reiter di Domenico	Report	Goal	Stadium: Teladan Stadium; Referee: Kosasih Kartadiredia (Indonesia)

11 May 1980 1980 Marah Halim Cup R1	Japan	1–0	Luxembourg	Medan, Indonesia
	Goal	Report		Stadium: Teladan Stadium; Referee: U Kyaw Zaw (Burma)

13 May 1980 1980 Marah Halim Cup SF	Burma	2–0	Luxembourg	Medan, Indonesia
	Maung Than Win	Report		Stadium: Teladan Stadium; Referee: Kazuo Yasudo (Japan)

14 May 1980 1980 Marah Halim Cup 3/4	Luxembourg	0–3	South Korea	Medan, Indonesia
		Report	Goal	Stadium: Teladan Stadium; Referee: Sudarso Hardjowasito (Indonesia)

10 September 1980 1982 WCQ	Luxembourg	0–5	Yugoslavia	Luxembourg City, Luxembourg
		Report	Sušić 50'; Zl. Vujović 64', 81'; Petrović 70'; Buljan 90'	Stadium: Stade Municipal; Attendance: 3,500; Referee: Franz Latzin (Austria)

4 October 1980 Friendly	Luxembourg	0–2	United States	Luxembourg City, Luxembourg
		Report	Hulcer 25'; Davis 82' (pen.)	Stadium: Stade Municipal; Attendance: 1,600; Referee: Gerd Hennig (West Germany)

11 October 1980 1982 WCQ	Luxembourg	0–2	Italy	Luxembourg City, Luxembourg
		Report	Collovati 33'; Bettega 77'	Stadium: Stade Municipal; Attendance: 10,000; Referee: Henk Weerink (Netherlands)

19 November 1980 1982 WCQ	Denmark	4–0	Luxembourg	Copenhagen, Denmark
	Arnesen 13', 41' (pen.); Elkjær 57'; Simonsen 71'	Report		Stadium: Idrætsparken; Attendance: 10,500; Referee: Clive White (England)

=== 1981 ===
28 January 1981 1982 WCQ	Greece	2–0	Luxembourg	Thessaloniki, Greece
	Kouis 8'; Kostikos 33'	Report		Stadium: Charliaou Stadium; Attendance: 14,000; Referee: Nikolai Dudin (Bulgaria)

11 March 1981 1982 WCQ	Luxembourg	0–2	Greece	Luxembourg City, Luxembourg
		Report	Kouis 31'; Mavros 54' (pen.)	Stadium: Stade Municipal; Attendance: 8,590; Referee: Peter Scherz (Switzerland)

1 May 1981 1982 WCQ	Luxembourg	1–2	Denmark	Luxembourg City, Luxembourg
	Nurenberg 37'	Report	Elkjær 46'; Arnesen 62'	Stadium: Stade Municipal; Attendance: 2,844; Referee: Louis Delsemme (Belgium)

14 October 1981 Friendly	Spain	3–0	Luxembourg	Valencia, Spain
	López Ufarte 68', 82'; Saura 75'	Report		Stadium: Estadio Luís Casanova; Attendance: 15,000; Referee: Paolo Casarin (Italy)

21 November 1981 1982 WCQ	Yugoslavia	5–0	Luxembourg	Novi Sad, Yugoslavia
	Halilhodžić 1', 45'; Šurjak 65'; Pašić 73'; Zl. Vujović 75'	Report		Stadium: Karađorđe Stadium; Attendance: 20,000; Referee: Charles Scerri (Malta)

5 December 1981 1982 WCQ	Italy	1–0	Luxembourg	Naples, Italy
	Collovati 7'	Report		Stadium: Stadio San Paolo; Attendance: 49,247; Referee: Velichko Tsonchev (Bulgaria)

=== 1982 ===
9 October 1982 1984 ECQ	Luxembourg	0–2	Greece	Luxembourg City, Luxembourg
		Report	Anastopoulos 7' (pen.), 26'	Stadium: Stade Municipal; Attendance: 2,858; Referee: Karl-Heinz Tritschler (West Germany)

10 November 1982 1984 ECQ	Luxembourg	1–2	Denmark	Luxembourg City, Luxembourg
	Di Domenico 54'	Report	Lerby 31' (pen.); Berggreen 67'	Stadium: Stade Municipal; Attendance: 2,057; Referee: Gérard Biguet (France)

15 December 1982 1984 ECQ	England	9–0	Luxembourg	London, England
	Bossi 18' (o.g.); Coppell 22'; Woodcock 34'; Blissett 44', 62', 86'; Chamberlain 71'; Hoddle 87'; Neal 89'	UEFA; Report		Stadium: Wembley; Attendance: 33,980; Referee: Hreidar Jonsson (Iceland)

=== 1983 ===
27 March 1983 1984 ECQ	Luxembourg	2–6	Hungary	Luxembourg City, Luxembourg
	Reiter 4'; Schreiner 55'	Report	Póczik 30', 59', 69'; Nyilasi 40'; Pölöskei 50'; Hannich 56'	Stadium: Stade Municipal; Attendance: 2,200; Referee: Gerard Geurds (Netherlands)

17 April 1983 1984 ECQ	Hungary	6–2	Luxembourg	Budapest, Hungary
	Hajszán 21'; Nyilasi 33', 63'; Kiss 35'; Szentes 61'; Burcsa 65'	Report	Reiter 56'; Malget 57'	Stadium: Népstadion; Attendance: 12,280; Referee: Edgar Azzopardi (Malta)

12 October 1983 1984 ECQ	Denmark	6–0	Luxembourg	Copenhagen, Denmark
	Laudrup 16', 23', 69'; Elkjær 35', 58'; Simonsen 41'	Report		Stadium: Idrætsparken; Attendance: 44,700; Referee: Kaj Natri (Finland)

16 November 1983 1984 ECQ	Luxembourg	0–4	England	Luxembourg City, Luxembourg
		UEFA; Report	Robson 10', 56'; Mariner 38'; Butcher 50'	Stadium: Josy Barthel; Attendance: 5,400; Referee: Cornelius Bakker (Netherlands)

14 December 1983 1984 ECQ	Greece	1–0	Luxembourg	Piraeus, Greece
	Saravakos 18'	Report		Stadium: Georgios Karaiskakis Stadium; Attendance: 1,500; Referee: Velitchko Tzontchev (Bulgaria)

=== 1984 ===
29 February 1984 Friendly	Luxembourg	0–1	Spain	Luxembourg City, Luxembourg
		Report	Maceda 64'	Stadium: Stade Municipal; Attendance: 3,000; Referee: Philippe Mercier (Switzerland)

11 March 1984 Friendly	Luxembourg	1–3	Turkey	Esch-sur-Alzette, Luxembourg
	Dresch 39'	Report	Özden 62'; Tüfekçi 71', 74'	Stadium: Stade de la Frontière; Attendance: 8,000; Referee: Karl-Josef Assenmacher (West Germany)

1 May 1984 Friendly	Luxembourg	0–2	Norway	Ettelbruck, Luxembourg
		Report	Thoresen 48'; Dokken 74'	Stadium: Stade Am Deich; Attendance: 1,411; Referee: Robert Wurtz (France)

9 June 1984 Friendly	Luxembourg	1–2	Portugal	Luxembourg City, Luxembourg
	Wagner 34'	Report	Eurico 56'; Diamantino 62'	Stadium: Stade Municipal; Attendance: 5,000; Referee: Itzhak Ben Itzhak (Israel)

13 October 1984 1986 WCQ	Luxembourg	0–4	France	Luxembourg City, Luxembourg
		Report	Battiston 2'; Platini 12'; Stopyra 24', 32'	Stadium: Stade Municipal; Attendance: 10,000; Referee: Henning Lund-Sørensen (Denmark)

17 November 1984 1986 WCQ	Luxembourg	0–5	East Germany	Esch-sur-Alzette, Luxembourg
		Report	Ernst 60', 76', 81'; Minge 63', 78'	Stadium: Stade de la Frontière; Attendance: 1,179; Referee: Thomas Donnelly (Northern Ireland)

5 December 1984 1986 WCQ	Bulgaria	4–0	Luxembourg	Sofia, Bulgaria
	Sirakov 8'; Velitchkov 31'; Mladenov 65'; Dimitrov 70'	Report		Stadium: Vasil Levski National Stadium; Attendance: 15,000; Referee: Antonis Vassaras (Greece)

17 December 1984 Friendly	Cyprus	1–0	Luxembourg	Nicosia, Cyprus
	Tsikkos 52'	Report		Stadium: Makario Stadium; Attendance: 1,000; Referee: G. Philippides (Cyprus)

19 December 1984 Friendly	Israel	2–0	Luxembourg	Petah Tikva, Israel
	Malmilian 47' (pen.); Ohana 51'	Report		Stadium: Municipal (HaUrva) Stadium; Attendance: 600; Referee: Arie Frost (Israel)

22 December 1984 Friendly	Turkey	1–0	Luxembourg	Istanbul, Turkey
	Güray 39'	Report		Stadium: İnönü Stadyumu; Attendance: 15,000; Referee: Ahmed Yasharov (Bulgaria)

=== 1985 ===
27 March 1985 1986 WCQ	Yugoslavia	1–0	Luxembourg	Zenica, Yugoslavia
	Gudelj 27'	Report		Stadium: Bilino Polje; Attendance: 30,000; Referee: Alexandr Mushkovets (Soviet Union)

24 April 1985 Friendly	Luxembourg	0–0	Iceland	Ettelbruck, Luxembourg
		Report		Stadium: Stade Am Deich; Attendance: 540; Referee: Gérard Biguet (France)

1 May 1985 1986 WCQ	Luxembourg	0–1	Yugoslavia	Luxembourg City, Luxembourg
		Report	Vokrri 89'	Stadium: Stade Municipal; Attendance: 6,550; Referee: Gudmund Haraldsson (Iceland)

18 May 1985 1986 WCQ	East Germany	3–1	Luxembourg	Potsdam, Germany
	Minge 19', 38'; Ernst 45' (pen.)	Report	Langers 76'	Stadium: Karl-Liebknecht-Stadion; Attendance: 9,000; Referee: Charles Scerri (Malta)

25 September 1985 1986 WCQ	Luxembourg	1–3	Bulgaria	Luxembourg City, Luxembourg
	Langers 65'	Report	Hellers 2' (o.g.); Kostadinov 26'; Dimitrov 33'	Stadium: Stade Municipal; Attendance: 1,050; Referee: David Syme (Scotland)

30 October 1985 1986 WCQ	France	6–0	Luxembourg	Paris, France
	Rocheteau 4', 29', 48'; Touré 24'; Giresse 36'; Fernández 47' (pen.)	Report		Stadium: Parc des Princes; Attendance: 28,597; Referee: Michał Listkiewicz (Poland)

=== 1986 ===
5 February 1986 Friendly	Portugal	2–0	Luxembourg	Portimão, Portugal
	Frederico 3'; Gomes 21'	Report		Stadium: Estádio Municipal; Attendance: 6,000; Referee: Emilio Guruceta Muro (Spain)

14 October 1986 1988 ECQ	Luxembourg	0–6	Belgium	Luxembourg City, Luxembourg
		Report	Gerets 6'; Claesen 9', 54', 89'; Vercauteren 41'; Ceulemans 87'	Stadium: Stade Municipal; Attendance: 9,534; Referee: Krzysztof Czemarmazowicz (Poland)

12 November 1986 1988 ECQ	Scotland	3–0	Luxembourg	Glasgow, Scotland
	Cooper 24' (pen.), 38'; Johnston 70'	Report		Stadium: Hampden Park; Attendance: 35,078; Referee: Eysteinn Guðmundsson (Iceland)

=== 1987 ===
30 April 1987 1988 ECQ	Luxembourg	1–4	Bulgaria	Luxembourg City, Luxembourg
	Langers 59'	Report	Sadakov 49'; Sirakov 55'; Tanev 62'; Kolev 82'	Stadium: Stade Municipal; Attendance: 1,920; Referee: Guðmundur Haraldsson (Iceland)

20 May 1987 1988 ECQ	Bulgaria	3–0	Luxembourg	Sofia, Bulgaria
	Sirakov 25'; Yordanov 39'; Kolev 56'	Report		Stadium: Vasil Levski National Stadium; Attendance: 14,756; Referee: Ion Craciunescu (Romania)

28 May 1987 1988 ECQ	Luxembourg	0–2	Republic of Ireland	Luxembourg City, Luxembourg
		Report	Galvin 44'; Whelan 64'	Stadium: Stade Municipal; Attendance: 4,965; Referee: Renzo Peduzzi (Switzerland)

9 September 1987 1988 ECQ	Republic of Ireland	2–1	Luxembourg	Dublin, Republic of Ireland
	Stapleton 31'; McGrath 75'	Report	Krings 28'	Stadium: Lansdowne Road; Attendance: 18,000; Referee: Keith Cooper (Wales)

23 September 1987 Friendly	Spain	2–0	Luxembourg	Castellón de la Plana, Spain
	Carrasco 26' (pen.); Butragueño 65' (pen.)	Report		Stadium: Nuevo Estadio Castalia; Attendance: 22,000; Referee: José Guedes (Portugal)

11 November 1987 1988 ECQ	Belgium	3–0	Luxembourg	Brussels, Belgium
	Ceulemans 17'; Degryse 55'; Crève 81'	Report		Stadium: King Baudouin Stadium; Attendance: 2,504; Referee: Egil Nervik (Norway)

2 December 1987 1988 ECQ	Luxembourg	0–0	Scotland	Esch-sur-Alzette, Luxembourg
		Report		Stadium: Stade de la Frontière; Attendance: 1,999; Referee: Manfred Neuner (West Germany

=== 1988 ===
27 April 1988 Friendly	Luxembourg	0–3	Italy	Luxembourg City, Luxembourg
		Report	Ferri 24'; Bergomi 28'; De Agostini 33'	Stadium: Stade Municipal; Attendance: 5,480; Referee: Jacob van der Niet (Netherlands)

21 September 1988 1990 WCQ	Luxembourg	1–4	Switzerland	Luxembourg City, Luxembourg
	Langers 80'	Report	A. Sutter 1'; Turkyilmaz 21' (pen.), 53'; B. Sutter 28'	Stadium: Stade Municipal; Attendance: 2,092; Referee: Ignace van Swieten (Netherlands)

18 October 1988 1990 WCQ	Luxembourg	0–2	Czechoslovakia	Esch-sur-Alzette, Luxembourg
		Report	Hašek 25'; Chovanec 35'	Stadium: Stade de la Frontière; Attendance: 1,826; Referee: Dusan Čolić (Yugoslavia)

16 November 1988 1990 WCQ	Portugal	1–0	Luxembourg	Porto, Portugal
	Gomes 31'	Report		Stadium: Estádio do Bessa; Attendance: 5,925; Referee: Michael Caulfield (Republic of Ireland)

=== 1989 ===
9 May 1989 1990 WCQ	Czechoslovakia	4–0	Luxembourg	Prague, Czechoslovakia
	Griga 6'; Skuhravý 76', 84'; Bílek 81'	Report		Stadium: Letná Stadium; Attendance: 16,350; Referee: Thomas Donnelly (Northern Ireland)

1 June 1989 1990 WCQ	Luxembourg	0–5	Belgium	Lille, France
		Report	van der Linden 13', 52', 62', 89'; Vervoort 64'	Stadium: Stade Grimonprez Jooris; Attendance: 9,100; Referee: Borislav Alexandrov (Bulgaria)

11 October 1989 1990 WCQ	Luxembourg	0–3	Portugal	Saarbrücken, West Germany
		Report	Águas 43', 53'; Barros 72'	Stadium: Ludwigspark Stadion; Attendance: 1,800; Referee: John Purcell (Republic of Ireland)

25 October 1989 1990 WCQ	Belgium	1–1	Luxembourg	Brussels, Belgium
	Versavel 7'	Report	Hellers 88'	Stadium: Heysel Stadium; Attendance: 11,600; Referee: Guðmundur Haraldsson (Iceland)

15 November 1989 1990 WCQ	Switzerland	2–1	Luxembourg	St. Gallen, Switzerland
	Bonvin 54'; Turkyilmaz 62'	Report	Malget 14'	Stadium: Espenmoos; Attendance: 2,500; Referee: Ovadia Ben Itzhak (Israel)

== 1990s ==
=== 1990 ===
28 March 1990 Friendly	Luxembourg	1–2	Iceland	Esch-sur-Alzette, Luxembourg
	Malget 39'	Report	Pétursson 16'; Þórðarson 28'	Stadium: Stade de la Frontière; Attendance: 400; Referee: Jean-François Crucke (Belgium)

31 October 1990 1992 ECQ	Luxembourg	2–3	Germany	Luxembourg City, Luxembourg
	Girres 57'; Langers 65'	Report	Klinsmann 16'; Bein 30'; Völler 49'	Stadium: Stade Municipal; Attendance: 9,512; Referee: Kim Milton Nielsen (Denmark)

14 November 1990 1992 ECQ	Luxembourg	0–1	Wales	Luxembourg City, Luxembourg
		Report	Rush 15'	Stadium: Stade Municipal; Attendance: 6,703; Referee: Jiří Ulrich (Czechoslovakia)

=== 1991 ===
27 February 1991 1992 ECQ	Belgium	3–0	Luxembourg	Anderlecht, Belgium
	Vandenbergh 7'; Ceulemans 16'; Scifo 35'	Report		Stadium: Constant Vanden Stock Stadium; Attendance: 11,105; Referee: Loizos Loizou (Cyprus)

11 September 1991 1992 ECQ	Luxembourg	0–2	Belgium	Luxembourg City, Luxembourg
		Report	Scifo 25'; Degryse 49'	Stadium: Stade Municipal; Attendance: 6,872; Referee: Rémi Harrel (France)

12 October 1991 Friendly	Luxembourg	1–1	Portugal	Luxembourg City, Luxembourg
	Weis 65' (pen.)	Report	Nogueria 48'	Stadium: Stade Municipal; Attendance: 3,000; Referee: Alphonse Costantin (Belgium)

13 November 1991 1992 ECQ	Wales	1–0	Luxembourg	Cardiff, Wales
	Bodin 82' (pen.)	Report		Stadium: Cardiff Arms Park; Attendance: 19,813; Referee: Sándor Puhl (Hungary)

18 December 1991 1992 ECQ	Germany	4–0	Luxembourg	Leverkusen, Germany
	Matthäus 15' (pen.); Buchwald 44'; Riedle 51'; Häßler 62'	Report		Stadium: Ulrich Haberland Stadium; Attendance: 20,395; Referee: Zbigniew Przesmycki (Poland)

=== 1992 ===
25 March 1992 Friendly	Luxembourg	2–3	Turkey	Luxembourg City, Luxembourg
	Girres 24'; Wolf 45'	Report	Karaman 9'; Mandıralı 15', 66'	Stadium: Stade Municipal; Attendance: 2,000; Referee: Léon Schelings (Belgium)

9 September 1992 1994 WCQ	Luxembourg	0–3	Hungary	Luxembourg City, Luxembourg
		Report	Détári 15'; K. Kovács 53', 78'	Stadium: Stade Municipal; Attendance: 3,026; Referee: Loizos Loizou (Cyprus)

28 October 1992 1994 WCQ	Russia	2–0	Luxembourg	Moscow, Russia
	Yuran 5'; Radchenko 24'	Report		Stadium: Luzhniki Stadium; Attendance: 1,750; Referee: Ilkka Koho (Finland)

=== 1993 ===
17 February 1993 1994 WCQ	Greece	2–0	Luxembourg	Athens, Greece
	Dimitriadis 30' (pen.); Mitropoulos 65'	Report		Stadium: Olympic Stadium; Attendance: 36,256; Referee: Václav Krondl (Czech Republic)

14 April 1993 1994 WCQ	Luxembourg	0–4	Russia	Luxembourg City, Luxembourg
		Report	Kiriakov 11', 46'; Shalimov 58'; Kulkov 90'	Stadium: Stade Municipal; Attendance: 3,180; Referee: Alan Snoddy (Northern Ireland)

20 May 1993 1994 WCQ	Luxembourg	1–1	Iceland	Luxembourg City, Luxembourg
	Birgisson 70' (o.g.)	Report	Gudjohnsen 40'	Stadium: Stade Municipal; Attendance: 1,965; Referee: Jorge Coroado (Portugal)

8 September 1993 1994 WCQ	Iceland	1–0	Luxembourg	Reykjavík, Iceland
	Ingólfsson 61'	Report		Stadium: Laugardalsvöllur; Attendance: 3,969; Referee: Nemus Djurhuus (Faroe Islands)

12 October 1993 1994 WCQ	Luxembourg	1–3	Greece	Luxembourg City, Luxembourg
	Fanelli 82'	Report	Machlas 31'; Apostolakis 63'; Saravakos 71'	Stadium: Stade Josy Barthel; Attendance: 2,538; Referee: Andrew Waddell (Scotland)

27 October 1993 1994 WCQ	Hungary	1–0	Luxembourg	Budapest, Hungary
	Détári 20'	Report		Stadium: Népstadion; Attendance: 1,500; Referee: Oğuz Sarvan (Turkey)

=== 1994 ===
23 March 1994 Friendly	Luxembourg	1–2	Morocco	Luxembourg City, Luxembourg
	Wolf 71'	Report; Report	Strasser 45' (o.g.); Hadrioui 89'	Stadium: Stade Josy Barthel; Attendance: 500; Referee: Didier Pauchard (France)

7 September 1994 1996 ECQ	Luxembourg	0–4	Netherlands	Luxembourg City, Luxembourg
		Report	Roy 23'; R.de Boer 65', 67'; Jonk 90'	Stadium: Stade Josy Barthel; Attendance: 8,120; Referee: Alan Snoddy (Northern Ireland)

12 October 1994 1996 ECQ	Belarus	2–0	Luxembourg	Minsk, Belarus
	Romashchenko 68'; Gerasimets 76'	Report		Stadium: Dinamo Stadium; Attendance: 6,549; Referee: Richard O'Hanlon (Ireland)

14 December 1994 1996 ECQ	Netherlands	5–0	Luxembourg	Rotterdam, Netherlands
	Mulder 7'; Roy 17'; Jonk 40'; R.de Boer 52'; Seedorf 90'	Report		Stadium: De Kuip; Attendance: 26,000; Referee: Daniel Roduit (Switzerland)

=== 1995 ===
14 February 1995 Friendly	Israel	4–2	Luxembourg	Ashdod, Israel
	Harazi 22' (pen.); Hazan 34'; Turgeman 57'; Birsens 89' (o.g.)	Report	Langers 71', 77'	Stadium: Yud-Alef Stadium; Attendance: 1,500; Referee: Vahap Beyaz (Turkey)

22 February 1995 1996 ECQ	Malta	0–1	Luxembourg	Ta' Qali, Malta
		Report	Cardoni 55'	Stadium: Ta' Qali National Stadium; Attendance: 7,327; Referee: Mateo Beusan (Croatia)

29 March 1995 1996 ECQ	Luxembourg	0–2	Norway	Luxembourg City, Luxembourg
		Report	Leonhardsen 35'; Aase 77'	Stadium: Stade Josy Barthel; Attendance: 3,031; Referee: Nikolai Levnikov (Russia)

26 April 1995 1996 ECQ	Norway	5–0	Luxembourg	Oslo, Norway
	Jakobsen 11'; Fjørtoft 12'; Brattbakk 24'; Berg 46'; Rekdal 52'	Report		Stadium: Ullevaal; Attendance: 15,124; Referee: John Ferry (Northern Ireland)

7 June 1995 1996 ECQ	Luxembourg	1–0	Czech Republic	Luxembourg City, Luxembourg
	Hellers 89'	Report		Stadium: Stade Josy Barthel; Attendance: 1,030; Referee: John Ashman (Wales)

6 September 1995 1996 ECQ	Luxembourg	1–0	Malta	Luxembourg City, Luxembourg
	Holtz 44'	Report		Stadium: Stade Josy Barthel; Attendance: 4,809; Referee: Algirdas Dubinskas (Lithuania)

11 October 1995 1996 ECQ	Luxembourg	0–0	Belarus	Luxembourg City, Luxembourg
		Report		Stadium: Stade Josy Barthel; Attendance: 4,272; Referee: Paul Durkin (England)

15 November 1995 1996 ECQ	Czech Republic	3–0	Luxembourg	Prague, Czech Republic
	Drulák 37', 46'; Berger 57'	Report		Stadium: Letná Stadium; Attendance: 20,239; Referee: Alfred Wieser (Austria)

=== 1996 ===
7 February 1996 Friendly	Morocco	2–0	Luxembourg	Rabat, Morocco
	Sellami 36'; Hadda 79'	Report; Report		Stadium: Stade Prince Moulay Abdellah; Attendance: 20,000; Referee: Abderrahim El Arjoun (Morocco)

13 March 1996 Friendly	Luxembourg	1–1	Switzerland	Luxembourg City, Luxembourg
	Cardoni 8'	Report	Vega 75'	Stadium: Stade Josy Barthel; Attendance: 1,937; Referee: Amand Ancion (Belgium)

8 October 1996 1998 WCQ	Luxembourg	1–2	Bulgaria	Luxembourg City, Luxembourg
	Langers 20'	Report	Balakov 14' (pen.); Kostadinov 37'	Stadium: Stade Josy Barthel; Attendance: 3,775; Referee: Yevi Kollari (Albania)

10 November 1996 1998 WCQ	Luxembourg	0–4	Russia	Luxembourg City, Luxembourg
		Report	Tikhonov 34'; Kanchelskis 38'; Beschastnykh 50'; Karpin 77'	Stadium: Stade Josy Barthel; Attendance: 5,660; Referee: Juha Hirviniemi (Finland)

15 December 1996 1998 WCQ	Israel	1–0	Luxembourg	Ramat Gan, Israel
	Ohana 39'	Report		Stadium: National Stadium; Attendance: 24,400; Referee: John Ashman (Wales)

=== 1997 ===
31 March 1997 1998 WCQ	Luxembourg	0–3	Israel	Luxembourg City, Luxembourg
		Report	Zohar 11', 79'; Banin 86' (pen.)	Stadium: Stade Josy Barthel; Attendance: 6,066; Referee: René Temmink (Netherlands)

30 April 1997 1998 WCQ	Russia	3–0	Luxembourg	Moscow, Russia
	Kechinov 20'; Grishin 55'; Simutenkov 58'	Report		Stadium: Dinamo Stadium; Attendance: 9,200; Referee: John Rowbotham (Scotland)

8 June 1997 1998 WCQ	Bulgaria	4–0	Luxembourg	Burgas, Bulgaria
	Stoichkov 43' (pen.); Kostadinov 47'; Balakov 50' (pen.); Lechkov 81'	Report		Stadium: Neftochimik Stadium; Attendance: 20,000; Referee: Lucílio Batista (Portugal)

7 September 1997 1998 WCQ	Luxembourg	1–3	Cyprus	Luxembourg City, Luxembourg
	Amodio 14'	Report	Papavasiliou 6'; Ioannou 55', 79'	Stadium: Stade Josy Barthel; Attendance: 3,022; Referee: Gylfi Thor Orrason (Iceland)

11 October 1997 1998 WCQ	Cyprus	2–0	Luxembourg	Limassol, Cyprus
	Papavasiliou 79'; Spoljaric 85'	Report		Stadium: Tsirion Stadium; Attendance: 5,000; Referee: Bujar Pregja (Albania)

=== 1998 ===
31 May 1998 Friendly	Luxembourg	0–2	Cameroon	Luxembourg City, Luxembourg
		Report; Report	Omam-Biyik 35'; Tchami 72'	Stadium: Stade Josy Barthel; Attendance: 3,687; Referee: Dieter Schoch (Switzerland)

5 June 1998 Friendly	Germany	7–0	Luxembourg	Mannheim, Germany
	Ulf Kirsten 6', 45'; Jürgen Klinsmann 15'; Thomas Helmer 28'; Oliver Bierhoff 57', 72'; Christian Ziege 84'	Report		Stadium: Carl Benz Stadion; Attendance: 25,000; Referee: Fritz Stuchlik (Austria)

10 October 1998 2000 ECQ	Poland	3–0	Luxembourg	Warsaw, Poland
	Brzęczek 18'; Juskowiak 33'; Trzeciak 65'	Report		Stadium: Polish Army Stadium; Attendance: 8,500; Referee: Bujar Pregja (Albania)

14 October 1998 2000 ECQ	Luxembourg	0–3	England	Luxembourg City, Luxembourg
		Report	Owen 18'; Shearer 39' (pen.); Southgate 88'	Stadium: Stade Josy Barthel; Attendance: 8,054; Referee: Sotirios Vorgias (Greece)

18 November 1998 Friendly	Luxembourg	0–0	Belgium	Luxembourg City, Luxembourg
		Report		Stadium: Stade Josy Barthel; Attendance: 3,149; Referee: Stéphane Bré (France)

=== 1999 ===
10 March 1999 Friendly	Luxembourg	1–2	Iceland	Luxembourg City, Luxembourg
	Christophe 23'	Report	Gunnlaugsson 77' (pen.); Sigurðsson 85'	Stadium: Stade Josy Barthel; Attendance: 2,754; Referee: Eric Blareau (Belgium)

27 March 1999 2000 ECQ	Sweden	2–0	Luxembourg	Gothenburg, Sweden
	Mjällby 34'; Larsson 86'	Report		Stadium: Ullevi; Attendance: 37,728; Referee: Vasiliy Melnichuk (Ukraine)

31 March 1999 2000 ECQ	Luxembourg	0–2	Bulgaria	Luxembourg City, Luxembourg
		Report	Stoichkov 18'; Yordanov 38'	Stadium: Stade Josy Barthel; Attendance: 3,004; Referee: Milan Mitrovič (Slovenia)

9 June 1999 2000 ECQ	Luxembourg	2–3	Poland	Luxembourg City, Luxembourg
	Birsens 76'; Vanek 82'	Report	Siadaczka 22'; Wichniarek 45'; Iwan 68'	Stadium: Stade Josy Barthel; Attendance: 2,806; Referee: Valentin Ivanov (Russia)

4 September 1999 2000 ECQ	England	6–0	Luxembourg	London, England
	Shearer 10', 27', 34'; McManaman 29', 43'; Owen 90'	Report		Stadium: Wembley; Attendance: 68,772; Referee: Sergey Shmolik (Belarus)

8 September 1999 2000 ECQ	Luxembourg	0–1	Sweden	Luxembourg City, Luxembourg
		Report	Alexandersson 39'	Stadium: Stade Josy Barthel; Attendance: 4,228; Referee: Attila Hanácsek (Hungary)

10 October 1999 2000 ECQ	Bulgaria	3–0	Luxembourg	Sofia, Bulgaria
	Borimirov 40'; Petkov 68'; Hristov 78'	Report		Stadium: Bulgarian Army Stadium; Attendance: 3,000; Referee: Ladislav Gadoši (Slovakia)
