= UEFA Euro 1984 qualifying Group 3 =

Football tournament qualifying stage

Standings and results for Group 3 of the UEFA Euro 1984 qualifying tournament.

Group 3 consisted of Denmark, England, Greece, Hungary and Luxembourg. Group winners were Denmark, who finished a point clear of second-placed England.

== Final table ==
Pos	Team	Pld	W	D	L	GF	GA	GD	Pts	Qualification	(Denmark)	(England)	(Greece)	(Hungary)	(Luxembourg)
1	Denmark	8	6	1	1	17	5	+12	13	Qualify for final tournament	—	2–2	1–0	3–1	6–0
2	England	8	5	2	1	23	3	+20	12		0–1	—	0–0	2–0	9–0
3	Greece	8	3	2	3	8	10	−2	8		0–2	0–3	—	2–2	1–0
4	Hungary	8	3	1	4	18	17	+1	7		1–0	0–3	2–3	—	6–2
5	Luxembourg	8	0	0	8	5	36	−31	0		1–2	0–4	0–2	2–6	—

Source: UEFA
Rules for classification: Qualification tiebreakers

== Results ==
22 September 1982

Denmark	2–2	England
Hansen 68' (pen.); J.Olsen 89'	(Details)	Francis 8', 82'

Idrætsparken, Copenhagen
Attendance: 44,300
Referee: Charles Corver (Netherlands)

9 October 1982

Luxembourg	0–2	Greece
	(Details)	Anastopoulos 7' (pen.), 26'

Stade Municipal, Luxembourg City
Attendance: 2,858
Referee: Karl-Heinz Tritschler (West Germany)

10 November 1982

Luxembourg	1–2	Denmark
Di Domenico 54'	(Details)	Lerby 31' (pen.); Berggreen 67'

Stade Municipal, Luxembourg City
Attendance: 2,057
Referee: Gérard Biguet (France)

17 November 1982

Greece	0–3	England
	(Details)	Woodcock 1', 64'; Lee 68'

Kaftanzoglio Stadium, Thessaloniki
Attendance: 41,534
Referee: Adolf Prokop (East Germany)

15 December 1982

England	9–0	Luxembourg
Bossi 18' (o.g.); Coppell 22'; Woodcock 34'; Blissett 44', 62', 86'; Chamberlain 71'; Hoddle 87'; Neal 89'	(Details)

Wembley Stadium, London
Attendance: 33,977
Referee: Hreidar Jonsson (Iceland)

27 March 1983

Luxembourg	2–6	Hungary
Reiter 4'; Schreiner 55'	(Details)	Póczik 30', 59', 69'; Nyilasi 40'; Pölöskei 50'; Hannich 56'

Stade Municipal, Luxembourg City
Attendance: 2,159
Referee: Gerard Geurds (Netherlands)

30 March 1983

England	0–0	Greece
	(Details)

Wembley Stadium, London
Attendance: 44,051
Referee: Dušan Krchnak (Czechoslovakia)

17 April 1983

Hungary	6–2	Luxembourg
Hajszán 21'; Nyilasi 33', 63'; L. Kiss 35'; Szentes 61'; Burcsa 65'	(Details)	Reiter 56'; Malget 57'

Népstadion, Budapest
Attendance: 12,278
Referee: Edgar Azzopardi (Malta)

27 April 1983

Denmark	1–0	Greece
Busk 76'	(Details)

Idrætsparken, Copenhagen
Attendance: 33,710
Referee: Romualdas Yushka (Soviet Union)
27 April 1983

England	2–0	Hungary
Francis 31'; Withe 70'	(Details)

Wembley Stadium, London
Attendance: 50,544
Referee: Pietro D'elia (Italy)

15 May 1983

Hungary	2–3	Greece
Nyilasi 24'; Hajszan 88'	(Details)	Anastopoulos 15'; Kostikos 32'; Papaioannou 56'

Népstadion, Budapest
Attendance: 13,126
Referee: Edvard Sostaric (Yugoslavia)

1 June 1983

Denmark	3–1	Hungary
Elkjær 3'; J.Olsen 81'; Simonsen 85' (pen.)	(Details)	Nyilasi 29'

Idrætsparken, Copenhagen
Attendance: 44,800
Referee: Heinz Fahnler (Austria)

21 September 1983

England	0–1	Denmark
	(Details)	Simonsen 36' (pen.)

Wembley Stadium, London
Attendance: 79,323
Referee: Alexis Ponnet (Belgium)

12 October 1983

Hungary	0–3	England
	(Details)	Hoddle 13'; Lee 19'; Mariner 42'

Népstadion, Budapest
Attendance: 19,956
Referee: Bruno Galler (Switzerland)
12 October 1983

Denmark	6–0	Luxembourg
Laudrup 16', 23', 69'; Elkjær 35', 58'; Simonsen 41'	(Details)

Idrætsparken, Copenhagen
Attendance: 44,700
Referee: Kaj Natri (Finland)

26 October 1983

Hungary	1–0	Denmark
S. Kiss 57'	(Details)

Népstadion, Budapest
Attendance: 6,333
Referee: Emilio Guruceta Muro (Spain)

16 November 1983

Greece	0–2	Denmark
	(Details)	Elkjær 16'; Simonsen 47'

Olympic Stadium, Athens
Attendance: 19,720
Referee: Paolo Bergamo (Italy)
16 November 1983

Luxembourg	0–4	England
	(Details)	Robson 10', 56'; Mariner 38'; Butcher 80'

Stade Municipal, Luxembourg City
Attendance: 5,418
Referee: Cornelius Bakker (Netherlands)

3 December 1983

Greece	2–2	Hungary
Anastopoulos 9', 55'	(Details)	Kardos 12'; Törőcsik 40'

Kaftanzoglio Stadium, Thessaloniki
Attendance: 651
Referee: Ioan Igna (Romania)

14 December 1983

Greece	1–0	Luxembourg
Saravakos 18'	(Details)

Georgios Karaiskakis Stadium, Piraeus
Attendance: 1,483
Referee: Velitchko Tzontchev (Bulgaria)

== Goalscorers ==
There were 71 goals scored in 20 matches, for an average of 3.55 goals per match.

5 goals

- (Greece) Nikos Anastopoulos
- (Hungary) Tibor Nyilasi

4 goals

- (Denmark) Preben Elkjær
- (Denmark) Allan Simonsen

3 goals

- (Denmark) Michael Laudrup
- (England) Luther Blissett
- (England) Trevor Francis
- (England) Tony Woodcock
- (Hungary) József Póczik

2 goals

- (Denmark) Jesper Olsen
- (England) Glenn Hoddle
- (England) Sammy Lee
- (England) Paul Mariner
- (England) Bryan Robson
- (Hungary) Gyula Hajszán
- (Luxembourg) Jeannot Reiter

1 goal

- (Denmark) Klaus Berggreen
- (Denmark) Søren Busk
- (Denmark) Allan Hansen
- (Denmark) Søren Lerby
- (England) Terry Butcher
- (England) Mark Chamberlain
- (England) Steve Coppell
- (England) Phil Neal
- (England) Peter Withe
- (Greece) Georgios Kostikos
- (Greece) Lakis Papaioannou
- (Greece) Dimitris Saravakos
- (Hungary) Béla Bodonyi
- (Hungary) Győző Burcsa
- (Hungary) Péter Hannich
- (Hungary) József Kardos
- (Hungary) László Kiss
- (Hungary) Sándor Kiss
- (Hungary) Gábor Pölöskei
- (Hungary) Lázár Szentes
- (Luxembourg) Marcel Di Domenico
- (Luxembourg) Théo Malget
- (Luxembourg) Romain Schreiner

1 own goal

- (Luxembourg) Marcel Bossi (against England)
