= 1986 FIFA World Cup qualification – UEFA Group 4 =

Football tournament qualification stage

The 1986 FIFA World Cup qualification UEFA Group 4 was a UEFA qualifying group for the 1986 FIFA World Cup. The group comprised Bulgaria, East Germany, France, Luxembourg and Yugoslavia.

The group was won on goal difference by France with Bulgaria as the runners-up. Both teams qualified for the 1986 FIFA World Cup.

== Standings ==
Pos	Team	Pld	W	D	L	GF	GA	GD	Pts	Qualification	France national football team	Bulgaria national football team	East Germany national football team	Yugoslavia national football team	Luxembourg national football team
1	France	8	5	1	2	15	4	+11	11	Qualification to 1986 FIFA World Cup	—	1–0	2–0	2–0	6–0
2	Bulgaria	8	5	1	2	13	5	+8	11	Qualification to 1986 FIFA World Cup	2–0	—	1–0	2–1	4–0
3	East Germany	8	5	0	3	16	9	+7	10		2–0	2–1	—	2–3	3–1
4	Yugoslavia	8	3	2	3	7	8	−1	8		0–0	0–0	1–2	—	1–0
5	Luxembourg	8	0	0	8	2	27	−25	0		0–4	1–3	0–5	0–1	—

=== Results ===
29 September 1984

Yugoslavia	0 – 0	Bulgaria
	Report

JNA Stadium, Belgrade
Attendance: 9,588
Referee: Laszlo Padar (Hungary)

13 October 1984

Luxembourg	0 – 4	France
	Report	Battiston 2'; Platini 13'; Stopyra 24', 33'

Stade Municipal, Luxembourg City
Attendance: 7,982
Referee: Henning Lund-Sørensen (Denmark)

20 October 1984

East Germany	2 – 3	Yugoslavia
Glowatzky 11'; Ernst 50'	Report	Baždarević 30'; Vokrri 48'; Šestić 80'

Zentralstadion, Leipzig
Attendance: 55,045
Referee: Horst Brummeier (Austria)

17 November 1984

Luxembourg	0 – 5	East Germany
	Report	Ernst 60', 76', 81'; Minge 63', 78'

Stade de la Frontière, Esch-sur-Alzette
Attendance: 1,179
Referee: Thomas Donnelly (Northern Ireland)

21 November 1984

France	1 – 0	Bulgaria
Platini 62' (pen.)	Report

Parc des Princes, Paris
Attendance: 42,084
Referee: Karl-Heinz Tritschler (West Germany)

5 December 1984

Bulgaria	4 – 0	Luxembourg
Sirakov 8'; Velichkov 31'; Mladenov 65'; Dimitrov 70'	Report

Vasil Levski National Stadium, Sofia
Attendance: 12,189
Referee: Antonis Vassaras (Greece)

8 December 1984

France	2 – 0	East Germany
Stopyra 32'; Anziani 89'	Report

Parc des Princes, Paris
Attendance: 46,024
Referee: Paolo Casarin (Italy)

27 March 1985

Yugoslavia	1 – 0	Luxembourg
Gudelj 27'	Report

Bilino Polje Stadium, Zenica
Attendance: 24,505
Referee: Alexandr Mushkovets (Soviet Union)

3 April 1985

Yugoslavia	0 – 0	France
	Report

Koševo Stadium, Sarajevo
Attendance: 50,040
Referee: Erik Fredriksson (Sweden)

6 April 1985

Bulgaria	1 – 0	East Germany
Mladenov 87'	Report

Vasil Levski National Stadium, Sofia
Attendance: 47,396
Referee: Franz Wöhrer (Austria)

1 May 1985

Luxembourg	0 – 1	Yugoslavia
	Report	Vokrri 89'

Stade Municipal, Luxembourg City
Attendance: 6,853
Referee: Gudmund Haraldsson (Iceland)

2 May 1985

Bulgaria	2 – 0	France
Dimitrov 11'; Sirakov 61'	Report

Vasil Levski National Stadium, Sofia
Attendance: 57,000
Referee: Brian McGinlay (Scotland)

18 May 1985

East Germany	3 – 1	Luxembourg
Minge 19', 38'; Ernst 45' (pen.)	Report	Langers 76'

Karl-Liebknecht-Stadion, Potsdam
Attendance: 7,848
Referee: Charles Scerri (Malta)

1 June 1985

Bulgaria	2 – 1	Yugoslavia
Getov 27', 58'	Report	Djurovski 29'

Vasil Levski National Stadium, Sofia
Attendance: 59,587
Referee: Vojtech Christov (Czechoslovakia)

11 September 1985

East Germany	2 – 0	France
Ernst 53'; Kreer 81'	Report

Zentralstadion, Leipzig
Attendance: 70,152
Referee: Pietro D'Elia (Italy)

25 September 1985

Luxembourg	1 – 3	Bulgaria
Langers 65' (pen.)	Report	Hellers 2' (o.g.); Kostadinov 26'; Dimitrov 33'

Stade Municipal, Luxembourg City
Attendance: 1,062
Referee: David Syme (Scotland)

28 September 1985

Yugoslavia	1 – 2	East Germany
Škoro 83'	Report	Thom 47', 59'

JNA Stadium, Belgrade
Attendance: 28,800
Referee: Velodi Miminoshvili (Soviet Union)

30 October 1985

France	6 – 0	Luxembourg
Rocheteau 4', 29', 48'; Touré 24'; Giresse 36'; Fernandez 47' (pen.)	Report

Parc des Princes, Paris
Attendance: 28,597
Referee: Michal Listkiewicz (Poland)

16 November 1985

France	2 – 0	Yugoslavia
Platini 2', 71'	Report

Parc des Princes, Paris
Attendance: 45,670
Referee: Alexis Ponnet (Belgium)
16 November 1985

East Germany	2 – 1	Bulgaria
Zötzsche 4' (pen.); Liebers 40'	Report	Gochev 39'

Ernst-Thälmann-Stadion, Karl-Marx-Stadt
Attendance: 25,879
Referee: Jan Keizer (Netherlands)

== Goalscorers ==
6 goals

- (East Germany) Rainer Ernst

4 goals

- (East Germany) Ralf Minge
- (France) Michel Platini

3 goals

- (Bulgaria) Georgi Dimitrov
- (France) Dominique Rocheteau
- (France) Yannick Stopyra

2 goals

- (Bulgaria) Plamen Getov
- (Bulgaria) Stoycho Mladenov
- (Bulgaria) Nasko Sirakov
- (East Germany) Andreas Thom
- (Luxembourg) Robby Langers
- (Socialist Federal Republic of Yugoslavia) Fadil Vokrri

1 goal

- (Bulgaria) Rusi Gochev
- (Bulgaria) Kostadin Kostadinov
- (Bulgaria) Boycho Velichkov
- (East Germany) Michael Glowatzky
- (East Germany) Ronald Kreer
- (East Germany) Matthias Liebers
- (East Germany) Uwe Zötzsche
- (France) Philippe Anziani
- (France) Patrick Battiston
- (France) Luis Fernández
- (France) Alain Giresse
- (France) José Touré
- (Socialist Federal Republic of Yugoslavia) Mehmed Baždarević
- (Socialist Federal Republic of Yugoslavia) Milko Djurovski
- (Socialist Federal Republic of Yugoslavia) Ivan Gudelj
- (Socialist Federal Republic of Yugoslavia) Miloš Šestić
- (Socialist Federal Republic of Yugoslavia) Haris Škoro

1 own goal

- (Luxembourg) Guy Hellers (playing against Bulgaria)
