= 1990 FIFA World Cup qualification – UEFA Group 7 =

Football tournament qualification stage

The 1990 FIFA World Cup qualification UEFA Group 7 was a UEFA qualifying group for the 1990 FIFA World Cup. The group consisted of Belgium, Czechoslovakia, Luxembourg, Portugal and Switzerland.

The group was won by Belgium, who qualified for the 1990 FIFA World Cup. Czechoslovakia also qualified as runners-up.

== Standings ==
Pos	Team	Pld	W	D	L	GF	GA	GD	Pts	Qualification	Belgium national football team	Czechoslovakia national football team	Portugal national football team	Switzerland national football team	Luxembourg national football team
1	Belgium	8	4	4	0	15	5	+10	12	Qualification to 1990 FIFA World Cup	—	2–1	3–0	1–0	1–1
2	Czechoslovakia	8	5	2	1	13	3	+10	12	Qualification to 1990 FIFA World Cup	0–0	—	2–1	3–0	4–0
3	Portugal	8	4	2	2	11	8	+3	10		1–1	0–0	—	3–1	1–0
4	Switzerland	8	2	1	5	10	14	−4	5		2–2	0–1	1–2	—	2–1
5	Luxembourg	8	0	1	7	3	22	−19	1		0–5	0–2	0–3	1–4	—

=== Results ===
21 September 1988

Luxembourg	1 – 4	Switzerland
Langers 80'	(Report)	A. Sutter 1'; Türkyilmaz 21' (pen.), 53'; B. Sutter 28'

Stade Municipal, Luxembourg City
Attendance: 2,092
Referee: Ignace van Swieten (Netherlands)

18 October 1988

Luxembourg	0 – 2	Czechoslovakia
	(Report)	Hašek 25'; Chovanec 35'

Stade de la Frontière, Esch-sur-Alzette
Attendance: 1,826
Referee: Dusan Čolić (Yugoslavia)

19 October 1988

Belgium	1 – 0	Switzerland
Vervoort 30'	(Report)

Heysel Stadium, Brussels
Attendance: 14,450
Referee: David Syme (Scotland)

16 November 1988

Czechoslovakia	0 – 0	Belgium
	(Report)

Tehelné pole, Bratislava
Attendance: 47,182
Referee: Neil Midgley (England)
16 November 1988

Portugal	1 – 0	Luxembourg
Gomes 31'	(Report)

Estádio do Bessa, Porto
Attendance: 5,925
Referee: Michael Caulfield (Republic of Ireland)

15 February 1989

Portugal	1 – 1	Belgium
Paneira 53'	(Report)	van der Linden 84'

Estádio da Luz, Lisbon
Attendance: 43,501
Referee: Gérard Biguet (France)

26 April 1989

Portugal	3 – 1	Switzerland
João Pinto 48'; Rosa 56'; Paneira 69'	(Report)	Zuffi 64'

Estádio da Luz, Lisbon
Attendance: 18,460
Referee: Alan Gunn (England)

29 April 1989

Belgium	2 – 1	Czechoslovakia
Degryse 29', 77'	(Report)	Luhový 41'

Heysel Stadium, Brussels
Attendance: 34,612
Referee: Emilio Soriano Aladrén (Spain)

9 May 1989

Czechoslovakia	4 – 0	Luxembourg
Griga 6'; Skuhravý 76', 84'; Bílek 81'	(Report)

Letná Stadium, Prague
Attendance: 16,350
Referee: Thomas Donnelly (Northern Ireland)

1 June 1989

Luxembourg	0 – 5	Belgium
	(Report)	van der Linden 13', 52', 62', 89'; Vervoort 64'

Stade Grimonprez Jooris, Lille
Attendance: 9,100
Referee: Borislav Alexandrov (Bulgaria)

7 June 1989

Switzerland	0 – 1	Czechoslovakia
	(Report)	Skuhravý 22'

Wankdorf Stadium, Bern
Attendance: 33,000
Referee: Helmut Kohl (Austria)

6 September 1989

Belgium	3 – 0	Portugal
Ceulemans 34' van der Linden 59', 69'	(Report)

Heysel Stadium, Brussels
Attendance: 28,250
Referee: Alexey Spirin (Soviet Union)

20 September 1989

Switzerland	1 – 2	Portugal
Türkyilmaz 28' (pen.)	(Report)	Futre 74' (pen.); Águas 77'

Stade de la Maladière, Neuchâtel
Attendance: 18,400
Referee: Georgios Koukoulakis (Greece)

6 October 1989

Czechoslovakia	2 – 1	Portugal
Bilek 11' (pen.), 82'	(Report)	Águas 74'

Letná Stadium, Prague
Attendance: 29,809
Referee: Aron Schmidhuber (West Germany)

11 October 1989

Luxembourg	0 – 3	Portugal
	(Report)	Águas 43', 53'; Barros 72'

Ludwigspark Stadion, Saarbrücken
Attendance: 1,800
Referee: John Purcell (Republic of Ireland)
11 October 1989

Switzerland	2 – 2	Belgium
Knup 50'; Türkyilmaz 68'	(Report)	Degryse 58'; Geiger 73' (o.g.)

St. Jakob Stadium, Basel
Attendance: 5,000
Referee: Lajos Hartmann (Hungary)

25 October 1989

Czechoslovakia	3 – 0	Switzerland
Skuhravý 17'; Bílek 86'; Moravčik 88'	(Report)

Letná Stadium, Prague
Attendance: 33,759
Referee: Eeko Aho (Finland)
25 October 1989

Belgium	1 – 1	Luxembourg
Versavel 7'	(Report)	Hellers 88'

Heysel Stadium, Brussels
Attendance: 11,600
Referee: Guðmundur Haraldsson (Iceland)

15 November 1989

Portugal	0 – 0	Czechoslovakia
	(Report)

Estádio da Luz, Lisbon
Attendance: 40,000
Referee: David Syme (Scotland)
15 November 1989

Switzerland	2 – 1	Luxembourg
Bonvin 54'; Türkyilmaz 62'	(Report)	Malget 14'

Espenmoos, St. Gallen
Attendance: 2,500
Referee: Ovadia Ben Itzhak (Israel)

== Goalscorers ==
There were 52 goals scored during the 20 games, an average of 2.6 goals per game.

7 goals

- (Belgium) Marc Van Der Linden

5 goals

- (Switzerland) Kubilay Türkyilmaz

4 goals

- (Czechoslovakia) Michal Bílek
- (Czechoslovakia) Tomáš Skuhravý
- (Portugal) Rui Águas

3 goals

- (Belgium) Marc Degryse

2 goals

- (Belgium) Patrick Vervoort
- (Portugal) Vítor Paneira

1 goal

- (Belgium) Jan Ceulemans
- (Belgium) Bruno Versavel
- (Czechoslovakia) Jozef Chovanec
- (Czechoslovakia) Stanislav Griga
- (Czechoslovakia) Ivan Hašek
- (Czechoslovakia) Milan Luhový
- (Czechoslovakia) Ľubomír Moravčík
- (Luxembourg) Guy Hellers
- (Luxembourg) Robby Langers
- (Luxembourg) Théo Malget
- (Portugal) Rui Barros
- (Portugal) Paulo Futre
- (Portugal) Fernando Gomes
- (Portugal) João Pinto
- (Portugal) Frederico Rosa
- (Switzerland) Christophe Bonvin
- (Switzerland) Adrian Knup
- (Switzerland) Alain Sutter
- (Switzerland) Beat Sutter
- (Switzerland) Dario Zuffi

1 own goal

- (Switzerland) Alain Geiger (playing against Belgium)
