= UEFA Euro 2000 qualifying Group 5 =

2000 sports event

Standings and results for Group 5 of the UEFA Euro 2000 qualifying tournament.

== Standings ==
Pos	Team	Pld	W	D	L	GF	GA	GD	Pts	Qualification	(Sweden)	(England)	(Poland)	(Bulgaria)	(Luxembourg)
1	Sweden	8	7	1	0	10	1	+9	22	Qualify for final tournament	—	2–1	2–0	1–0	2–0
2	England	8	3	4	1	14	4	+10	13 (Note: Head-to-head points: England 4, Poland 1.)	Advance to play-offs	0–0	—	3–1	0–0	6–0
3	Poland	8	4	1	3	12	8	+4	13		0–1	0–0	—	2–0	3–0
4	Bulgaria	8	2	2	4	6	8	−2	8		0–1	1–1	0–3	—	3–0
5	Luxembourg	8	0	0	8	2	23	−21	0		0–1	0–3	2–3	0–2	—

Source: UEFA
Rules for classification: Qualification tiebreakers

== Matches ==
5 September 1998
18:00 UTC+02:00

Sweden	2–1	England
A. Andersson 30'; Mjällby 32'	Report	Shearer 2'

Råsunda Stadium, Solna
Attendance: 35,394
Referee: Pierluigi Collina (Italy)
6 September 1998
20:30 UTC+03:00

Bulgaria	0–3	Poland
	Report	Czereszewski 19', 44'; Iwan 48'

Neftochimik Stadium, Burgas
Attendance: 17,100
Referee: Marc Batta (France)

10 October 1998
15:00 UTC+01:00

England	0–0	Bulgaria
	Report

Wembley Stadium, London
Attendance: 72,974
Referee: László Vágner (Hungary)
10 October 1998
20:00 UTC+02:00

Poland	3–0	Luxembourg
Brzęczek 18'; Juskowiak 33'; Trzeciak 65'	Report

Stadion Wojska Polskiego, Warsaw
Attendance: 8,300
Referee: Bujar Pregja (Albania)

14 October 1998
19:30 UTC+03:00

Bulgaria	0–1	Sweden
	Report	Larsson 62'

Neftochimik Stadium, Burgas
Attendance: 12,021
Referee: Bernd Heynemann (Germany)
14 October 1998
20:30 UTC+02:00

Luxembourg	0–3	England
	Report	Owen 18'; Shearer 38' (pen.); Southgate 88'

Stade Josy Barthel, Luxembourg City
Attendance: 8,054
Referee: Sotirios Vorgias (Greece)

27 March 1999
15:00 UTC

England	3–1	Poland
Scholes 12', 22', 70'	Report	Brzęczek 28'

Wembley Stadium, London
Attendance: 73,836
Referee: Vítor Melo Pereira (Portugal)
27 March 1999
15:00 UTC+01:00

Sweden	2–0	Luxembourg
Mjällby 34'; Larsson 86'	Report

Ullevi, Gothenburg
Attendance: 37,728
Referee: Vasyl Melnychuk (Ukraine)

31 March 1999
20:00 UTC+02:00

Luxembourg	0–2	Bulgaria
	Report	Stoichkov 18'; Yordanov 38'

Stade Josy Barthel, Luxembourg City
Attendance: 3,004
Referee: Milan Mitrovič (Slovenia)
31 March 1999
20:30 UTC+02:00

Poland	0–1	Sweden
	Report	Ljungberg 36'

National Stadium, Chorzów
Attendance: 28,860
Referee: Markus Merk (Germany)

4 June 1999
20:30 UTC+02:00

Poland	2–0	Bulgaria
Hajto 15'; Iwan 62'	Report

Stadion Wojska Polskiego, Warsaw
Attendance: 6,266
Referee: Stefano Braschi (Italy)
5 June 1999
15:00 UTC+01:00

England	0–0	Sweden
	Report

Wembley Stadium, London
Attendance: 75,824
Referee: José Encinar (Spain)

9 June 1999
19:25 UTC+03:00

Bulgaria	1–1	England
Markov 18'	Report	Shearer 15'

Bulgarian Army Stadium, Sofia
Attendance: 17,500
Referee: Mario van der Ende (Netherlands)
9 June 1999
20:00 UTC+02:00

Luxembourg	2–3	Poland
Birsens 76'; Vanek 82'	Report	Siadaczka 22'; Wichniarek 45'; Iwan 68'

Stade Josy Barthel, Luxembourg City
Attendance: 2,806
Referee: Valentin Ivanov (Russia)

4 September 1999
15:00 UTC+01:00

England	6–0	Luxembourg
Shearer 12' (pen.), 28', 34'; McManaman 30', 44'; Owen 90'	Report

Wembley Stadium, London
Attendance: 68,772
Referee: Sergey Shmolik (Belarus)
4 September 1999
18:00 UTC+02:00

Sweden	1–0	Bulgaria
Alexandersson 65'	Report

Råsunda Stadium, Solna
Attendance: 35,640
Referee: Dani Koren (Israel)

8 September 1999
20:00 UTC+02:00

Luxembourg	0–1	Sweden
	Report	Alexandersson 39'

Stade Josy Barthel, Luxembourg City
Attendance: 4,228
Referee: Attila Hanácsek (Hungary)
8 September 1999
20:30 UTC+02:00

Poland	0–0	England
	Report

Stadion Wojska Polskiego, Warsaw
Attendance: 14,025
Referee: Günther Benkö (Austria)

9 October 1999
15:00 UTC+02:00

Sweden	2–0	Poland
K. Andersson 64'; Larsson 90+3'	Report

Råsunda Stadium, Solna
Attendance: 35,037
Referee: Urs Meier (Switzerland)
9 October 1999
18:00 UTC+03:00

Bulgaria	3–0	Luxembourg
Borimirov 40'; I. Petkov 68'; R. Hristov 78'	Report

Bulgarian Army Stadium, Sofia
Attendance: 2,000
Referee: Ladislav Gadoši (Slovakia)

== Goalscorers ==
There were 44 goals scored in 20 matches, for an average of 2.2 goals per match.

6 goals

- (England national football team) Alan Shearer

3 goals

- (England national football team) Paul Scholes
- (Poland national football team) Tomasz Iwan
- (Sweden men's national football team) Henrik Larsson

2 goals

- (England national football team) Steve McManaman
- (England national football team) Michael Owen
- (Poland national football team) Jerzy Brzęczek
- (Poland national football team) Sylwester Czereszewski
- (Sweden men's national football team) Niclas Alexandersson
- (Sweden men's national football team) Johan Mjällby

1 goal

- (Bulgaria national football team) Daniel Borimirov
- (Bulgaria national football team) Rumen Hristov
- (Bulgaria national football team) Georgi Markov
- (Bulgaria national football team) Ivaylo Petkov
- (Bulgaria national football team) Hristo Stoichkov
- (Bulgaria national football team) Ivaylo Yordanov
- (England national football team) Gareth Southgate
- (Luxembourg national football team) Marc Birsens
- (Luxembourg national football team) Jean-Pierre Vanek
- (Poland national football team) Tomasz Hajto
- (Poland national football team) Andrzej Juskowiak
- (Poland national football team) Rafał Siadaczka
- (Poland national football team) Mirosław Trzeciak
- (Poland national football team) Artur Wichniarek
- (Sweden men's national football team) Andreas Andersson
- (Sweden men's national football team) Kennet Andersson
- (Sweden men's national football team) Freddie Ljungberg
