= Malget =

Malget is a surname and may refer to:

- Kevin Malget (born 1991), Luxembourgian footballer
- Théo Malget (born 1961), Luxembourgian footballer
