= Sándor Kiss (footballer) =

Hungarian footballer and manager

Personal information
- Full name: Sándor Kiss
- Date of birth: 2 November 1956 (age 70)
- Place of birth: Szekszárd, Hungary
- Position: Forward

Youth career
- 1966–1975: Komlói Bányász SK

Senior career*
Years	Team	Apps	(Gls)
1975–1979	Pécsi MSC	42+	(19+)
1979–1986	Újpesti Dózsa	175	(63)
1986–1987	Cartagena	12	(0)
1987	Zalaegerszegi TE	8	(0)
1987	Oroszlányi Bányász SK		
1988–1989	Esbo Bollklubb		
1990–1991	Hangö IK	?	(26)
1992	Pécsi EAC		
Total		237+	(108+)

International career
1982–1983	Hungary	2	(2)

Managerial career
- Kozármisleny SE
- Pécsi EAC
- 1996–1998: Siklós FC
- Pécsi Vasutas SK
- Komlói Bányász SK
- 2008: Siklós FC
- * Club domestic league appearances and goals

Sándor Kiss (Hungarian: [saːndor kiʃː], born 2 November 1956) is a Hungarian former footballer and manager who played as a forward and made two appearances for the Hungary national team.

== Career ==
Kiss made his international debut for Hungary on 22 September 1982 in a friendly match against Turkey, in which he scored the fourth goal of the 5–0 home win. He made his second and final appearance on 26 October 1983 in a UEFA Euro 1984 qualifying match against Denmark, scoring the only goal in the 1–0 home win.

After retiring from his playing career, he became a manager.

== Career statistics ==
=== International ===
Hungary
Year	Apps	Goals
1982	1	1
1983	1	1
Total	2	2

=== International goals ===
No.	Date	Venue	Opponent	Score	Result	Competition
1	22 September 1982	Stadion ETO, Győr, Hungary	Turkey	4–0	5–0	Friendly
2	26 October 1983	Népstadion, Budapest, Hungary	Denmark	1–0	1–0	UEFA Euro 1984 qualifying
