= UEFA Euro 1992 qualifying Group 5 =

Football tournament qualifying stage

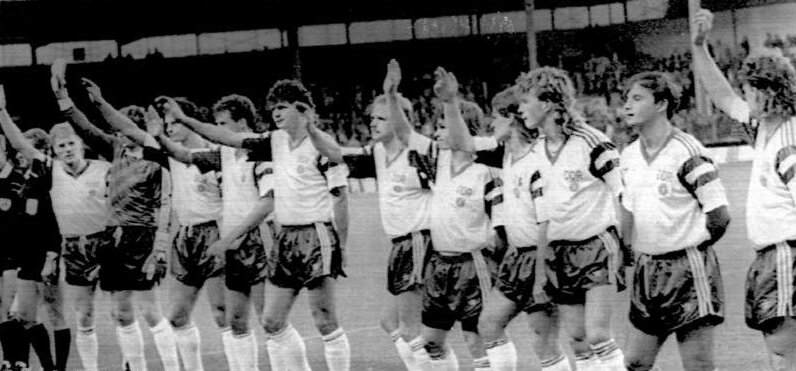
Brussels, 1990: saluting the crowd after the last match. The draw for 1992 UEFA European Football Championship qualifying took place on 2 February 1990, with East Germany drawn in Group 5 along with Belgium, Wales, Luxembourg - and West Germany. On 23 August that year, the East German parliament confirmed reunification for 3 October. As the planning for the opening fixture away to Belgium on 12 September was too far along to be cancelled, it was played as a friendly.

Group 5 of the UEFA Euro 1992 qualifying tournament was played as four team group consisting of Belgium, Germany, Luxembourg and Wales.

At the time of the draw on 2 February 1990, Group 5 had contained a fifth team, East Germany. The first scheduled match would see Belgium play East Germany on 12 September 1990. On 23 August 1990, the East German parliament confirmed reunification would take place on 3 October. Accordingly, said Belgium-East Germany match, for which tickets had been sold, was still played but as a friendly and was the last match East Germany played. All other games involving East Germany were scratched and fixtures initially scheduled for West Germany were now played as a unified Germany team.

== Final table ==
Pos	Team	Pld	W	D	L	GF	GA	GD	Pts	Qualification	(Germany)	(Wales)	(Belgium)	(Luxembourg)
1	Germany	6	5	0	1	13	4	+9	10	Qualify for final tournament	—	4–1	1–0	4–0
2	Wales	6	4	1	1	8	6	+2	9		1–0	—	3–1	1–0
3	Belgium	6	2	1	3	7	6	+1	5		0–1	1–1	—	3–0
4	Luxembourg	6	0	0	6	2	14	−12	0		2–3	0–1	0–2	—

Source: UEFA
Rules for classification: Qualification tiebreakers

== Results ==
17 October 1990
19:30 UTC+1

Wales	3–1	Belgium
Rush 29'; Saunders 86'; Hughes 88'	Report	Versavel 24'

Cardiff Arms Park, Cardiff
Attendance: 14,274
Referee: Kurt Röthlisberger (Switzerland)

31 October 1990
20:15 UTC+1

Luxembourg	2–3	Germany
Girres 57'; Langers 65'	Report	Klinsmann 16'; Bein 30'; Völler 49'

Stade Josy Barthel, Luxembourg City
Attendance: 9,512
Referee: Kim Milton Nielsen (Denmark)

14 November 1990
20:00 UTC+1

Luxembourg	0–1	Wales
	Report	Rush 15'

Stade Josy Barthel, Luxembourg City
Attendance: 6,703
Referee: Jiří Ulrich (Czechoslovakia)

27 February 1991
20:00 UTC+1

Belgium	3–0	Luxembourg
Vandenbergh 7'; Ceulemans 16'; Scifo 35'	Report

Constant Vanden Stock Stadium, Anderlecht
Attendance: 11,105
Referee: Loizos Loizou (Cyprus)

27 March 1991
20:00 UTC+1

Belgium	1–1	Wales
Degryse 48'	Report	Saunders 60'

Constant Vanden Stock Stadium, Anderlecht
Attendance: 18,591
Referee: Emilio Soriano Aladrén (Spain)

1 May 1991
18:15 UTC+2

Germany	1–0	Belgium
Matthäus 3'	Report

Niedersachsenstadion, Hanover
Attendance: 52,363
Referee: Zoran Petrović (Yugoslavia)

5 June 1991
19:15 UTC+1

Wales	1–0	Germany
Rush 66'	Report

Cardiff Arms Park, Cardiff
Attendance: 34,603
Referee: Bo Karlsson (Sweden)

11 September 1991
20:00 UTC+2

Luxembourg	0–2	Belgium
	Report	Scifo 25'; Degryse 49'

Stade Josy Barthel, Luxembourg City
Attendance: 6,872
Referee: Rémi Harrel (France)

16 October 1991
20:15 UTC+2

Germany	4–1	Wales
Möller 34'; Völler 39'; Riedle 45'; Doll 73'	Report	Bodin 84' (pen.)

Frankenstadion, Nuremberg
Attendance: 46,491
Referee: Joël Quiniou (France)

13 November 1991
19:30 UTC+0

Wales	1–0	Luxembourg
Bodin 82' (pen.)	Report

Cardiff Arms Park, Cardiff
Attendance: 19,813
Referee: Sándor Puhl (Hungary)

20 November 1991
20:00 UTC+1

Belgium	0–1	Germany
	Report	Völler 16'

Constant Vanden Stock Stadium, Anderlecht
Attendance: 16,138
Referee: Tullio Lanese (Italy)

18 December 1991
20:15 UTC+1

Germany	4–0	Luxembourg
Matthäus 15' (pen.); Buchwald 44'; Riedle 51'; Häßler 62'	Report

Ulrich Haberland Stadium, Leverkusen
Attendance: 20,395
Referee: Zbigniew Przesmycki (Poland)

== Goalscorers ==
There were 30 goals scored in 12 matches, for an average of 2.5 goals per match.

3 goals

- (Germany) Rudi Völler
- (Wales) Ian Rush

2 goals

- (Belgium) Marc Degryse
- (Belgium) Enzo Scifo
- (Germany) Lothar Matthäus
- (Germany) Karl-Heinz Riedle
- (Wales) Paul Bodin
- (Wales) Dean Saunders

1 goal

- (Belgium) Jan Ceulemans
- (Belgium) Erwin Vandenbergh
- (Belgium) Bruno Versavel
- (Germany) Uwe Bein
- (Germany) Guido Buchwald
- (Germany) Thomas Doll
- (Germany) Thomas Häßler
- (Germany) Jürgen Klinsmann
- (Germany) Andreas Möller
- (Luxembourg) Jean-Paul Girres
- (Luxembourg) Robby Langers
- (Wales) Mark Hughes
