= Plamen Getov =

Bulgarian footballer

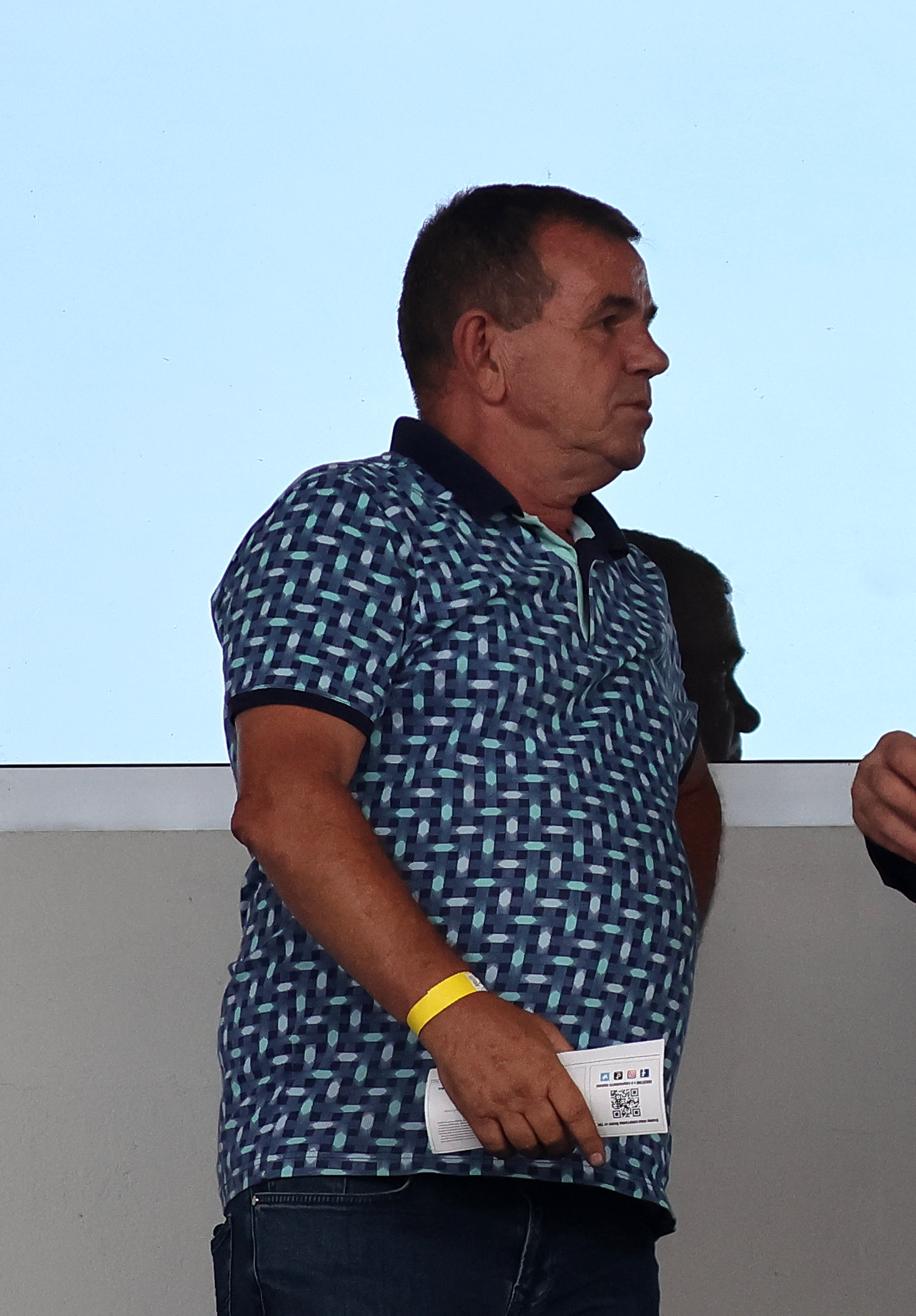
- Getov in 2011

Personal information
- Full name: Plamen Tsvetanov Getov
- Date of birth: 4 March 1959 (age 67)
- Place of birth: Sungurlare, Bulgaria
- Height: 1.76 m (5 ft 9 in)
- Positions: Attacking midfielder; striker

Senior career*
Years	Team	Apps	(Gls)
1977–1980	Spartak Varna	37	(7)
1978–1979	→ Vatev Beloslav (loan)	28	(7)
1980–1988	Spartak Pleven	207	(123)
1988	CSKA Sofia	11	(8)
1989–1991	Portimonense	71	(34)
1991–1992	Etar Veliko Tarnovo	10	(2)
1992–1993	Levski Sofia	30	(26)
1993–1994	Shumen	27	(18)
1994	Cherno More	3	(3)
1994–1995	Shumen	10	(2)
1995–1998	Spartak Pleven	41	(18)
Total		475	(249)

International career
1983–1989	Bulgaria	25	(4)
- * Club domestic league appearances and goals

Plamen Tsvetanov Getov (Bulgarian: Пламен Гетов; born 4 March 1959) is a Bulgarian retired footballer who played as either an attacking midfielder or a striker.

A skillful free-kick taker, he scored numerous goals from different positions, in a career which spanned almost 20 years. Getov represented Bulgaria at the 1986 World Cup.

== Career ==
Born in Sungurlare, Getov grew up in Varna. A product of Spartak Varna's youth academy, he progressed to their first-team in the 1977–78 season. He made 37 league appearances with 7 goals in his tenure at the club and had a loan spell at Vatev Beloslav.

In June 1980, Getov joined Spartak Pleven, where he scored 123 goals in 207 matches for eight seasons. In 1984–85 season Getov became A Group top scorer with 26 goals.

He was in the team that won the Bulgarian league twice: with CSKA Sofia in 1989 and with Levski Sofia in 1993. Proclaimed the best player of the 1992–93 season, he added the league to the top scorer's crown, scoring 26 goals at 34 years of age – he had already won that award in 1985, with 26 for Pleven.

Getov retired with his first club at 39, amassing totals of 286 games and 165 goals in the country's top division, of which 108 were for Spartak Pleven.

== International career ==
For the Bulgaria national team Getov gained 25 caps and netted four times, playing all four matches at the 1986 FIFA World Cup in Mexico and scoring against South Korea in a 1–1 group stage draw.

=== International goals ===
#	Date	Venue	Opponent	Score	Result	Competition
1	7 March 1983	Yuri Gagarin Stadium, Varna, Bulgaria	Switzerland	1–1	1–1	Friendly
2	1 June 1985	Vasil Levski National Stadium, Sofia, Bulgaria	(Socialist Federal Republic of Yugoslavia) Yugoslavia	1–0	2–1	1986 World Cup qualifying
3	1 June 1985	Vasil Levski, Sofia, Bulgaria	(Socialist Federal Republic of Yugoslavia) Yugoslavia	2–1	2–1	1986 World Cup qualifying
4	5 June 1986	Olímpico Universitario, Mexico City, Mexico	South Korea	1–0	1–1	1986 World Cup

== Honours ==
=== Club ===
CSKA Sofia

- A Group: 1988–89
- Bulgarian Cup: 1988-89

Levski Sofia

- A Group: 1992–93

=== Individual ===
- A Group Top Scorer (2): 1984–85 (26 goals); 1992–93 (26 goals)
