= Marc Van Der Linden =

Belgian footballer

Marc Van der Linden
Personal information
- Full name: Marc Angéle Vanderlinden
- Date of birth: 4 February 1964 (age 62)
- Place of birth: Merksem, Belgium
- Height: 1.77 m (5 ft 9 1/2 in)
- Position: Striker

Senior career*
Years	Team	Apps	(Gls)
1981–1989	Royal Antwerp	211	(85)
1989–1991	R.S.C. Anderlecht	40	(15)
1991–1994	K.A.A. Gent	65	(18)
1994	Maccabi Herzliya	12	(2)
1995	Ironi Rishon Lezion	13	(4)
1995–1997	K. Beerschot V.A.C.	36	(5)
Total		376	(129)

International career
1983–1990	Belgium	19	(9)
- * Club domestic league appearances and goals

Marc Angéle Vanderlinden (born 4 February 1964) is a Belgian former footballer.

He began his career with his local side SC Merksem before moving to Royal Antwerp FC in 1982. After seven seasons with the club he moved to R.S.C. Anderlecht in 1989 before joining K.A.A. Gent two years later. In 1995, he moved to Israel to play for Ironi Rishon LeZion and then Maccabi Herzliya before returning to his original club in 1997. Van der Linden continued to play for Merksem until 2002 when he retired. He also played 19 times for the Belgium national football team, scoring nine goals and appearing in the 1990 FIFA World Cup.

== Honours ==
=== Player ===
==== Anderlecht ====
- Belgian First Division: 1990–91
- European Cup Winners' Cup: 1989–90 (runners-up)

=== Individual ===
- 1990 FIFA World Cup qualification top scorer (7 goals)

== International goals ==
No.	Date	Venue	Opponent	Score	Result	Competition
1.	19 January 1988	Tel Aviv, Israel	Israel	2–0	3–2	Friendly
2.	15 February 1989	Lisbon, Portugal	Portugal	1–1	1–1	1990 FIFA World Cup qualification
3.	27 May 1989	Brussels, Belgium	Yugoslavia	1–0	1–0	Friendly
4.	1 June 1989	Lille, France	Luxembourg	1–0	5–0	1990 FIFA World Cup qualification
5.	1 June 1989	Lille, France	Luxembourg	2–0	5–0	1990 FIFA World Cup qualification
6.	1 June 1989	Lille, France	Luxembourg	3–0	5–0	1990 FIFA World Cup qualification
7.	1 June 1989	Lille, France	Luxembourg	5–0	5–0	1990 FIFA World Cup qualification
8.	6 September 1989	Brussels, Belgium	Portugal	2–0	3–0	1990 FIFA World Cup qualification
9.	6 September 1989	Brussels, Belgium	Portugal	3–0	3–0	1990 FIFA World Cup qualification
