= Mirosław Trzeciak =

Polish footballer

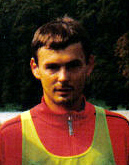

Personal information
- Full name: Mirosław Wojciech Trzeciak
- Date of birth: 11 April 1968 (age 58)
- Place of birth: Koszalin, Poland
- Height: 1.86 m (6 ft 1 in)
- Position: Striker

Youth career
- 1985–1987: Gwardia Koszalin

Senior career*
Years	Team	Apps	(Gls)
1988–1995	Lech Poznań	162	(45)
1995	Young Boys	12	(3)
1995–1996	Lech Poznań	28	(6)
1996	Maccabi Tel Aviv	0	(0)
1996–1998	ŁKS Łódź	56	(27)
1998–2001	Osasuna	68	(10)
2001–2003	Poli Ejido	26	(3)
Total		352	(94)

International career
1991–1999	Poland	22	(8)
- * Club domestic league appearances and goals

Mirosław Wojciech Trzeciak (born 11 April 1968), nicknamed Franek, is a Polish former professional footballer who played as a striker. In 1998, he was named the Polish Footballer of the Year.

== Football career ==
Trzeciak was born in Koszalin. During his career, Trzeciak, a Gwardia Koszalin trainee, also represented Lech Poznań – two different spells – BSC Young Boys (Switzerland), Maccabi Tel Aviv FC (Israel, for a few months), ŁKS Łódź, CA Osasuna and Polideportivo Ejido (both in Spain). In the latter country his La Liga totals consisted of ten matches during the 2000–01 season, spent with the former side.

The best years of Trzeciak's career were spent in Lech Poznań, where he won three leagues, one cup and one super cup. For eight years he was also a Poland international (22 caps, eight goals), but his best period arrived towards the end, during the Janusz Wójcik era (1997–99).

After his football career was over, Trzeciak stayed in Andalusia with former club Poli Ejido, coaching its junior teams. Subsequently he became a sports commentator in Poland and, in January 2007, he began working as director of sport development for Legia Warsaw.

=== International goals ===
#	Date	Venue	Opponent	Score	Result	Competition
1.	21 August 1991	Municipal Stadium, Gdynia, Poland	Sweden	2–0	2–0	Friendly
2.	14 June 1997	GKS Stadium, Katowice, Poland	Georgia	2–1	4–1	1998 FIFA World Cup qualification
3.	27 May 1998	Silesian Stadium, Chorzów, Poland	Russia	1–0	3–1	Friendly
4.	15 July 1998	Olympic National Sports Complex, Kyiv, Ukraine	Ukraine	1–0	2–1	Friendly
5.	5 August 1998	Municipal Stadium, Kraków, Poland	Israel	1–0	2–0	Friendly
6.	10 October 1998	Polish Army Stadium, Warsaw, Poland	Luxembourg	3–0	3–0	UEFA Euro 2000 qualifying
7.	3 March 1999	Polonia Warsaw Stadium, Warsaw, Poland	Armenia	1–0	1–0	Friendly
8.	28 April 1999	Polonia Warsaw Stadium, Warsaw, Poland	Czech Republic	1–0	2–1	Friendly

== Honours ==
Lech Poznań

- Ekstraklasa: 1989–90, 1991–92, 1992–93
- Polish Cup: 1987–88
- Polish Super Cup: 1990, 1992

ŁKS Łódź

- Ekstraklasa: 1997–98

Individual

- Ekstraklasa top scorer: 1996–97
- Piłka Nożna Polish Footballer of the Year: 1998
