= Artur Wichniarek =

Polish footballer

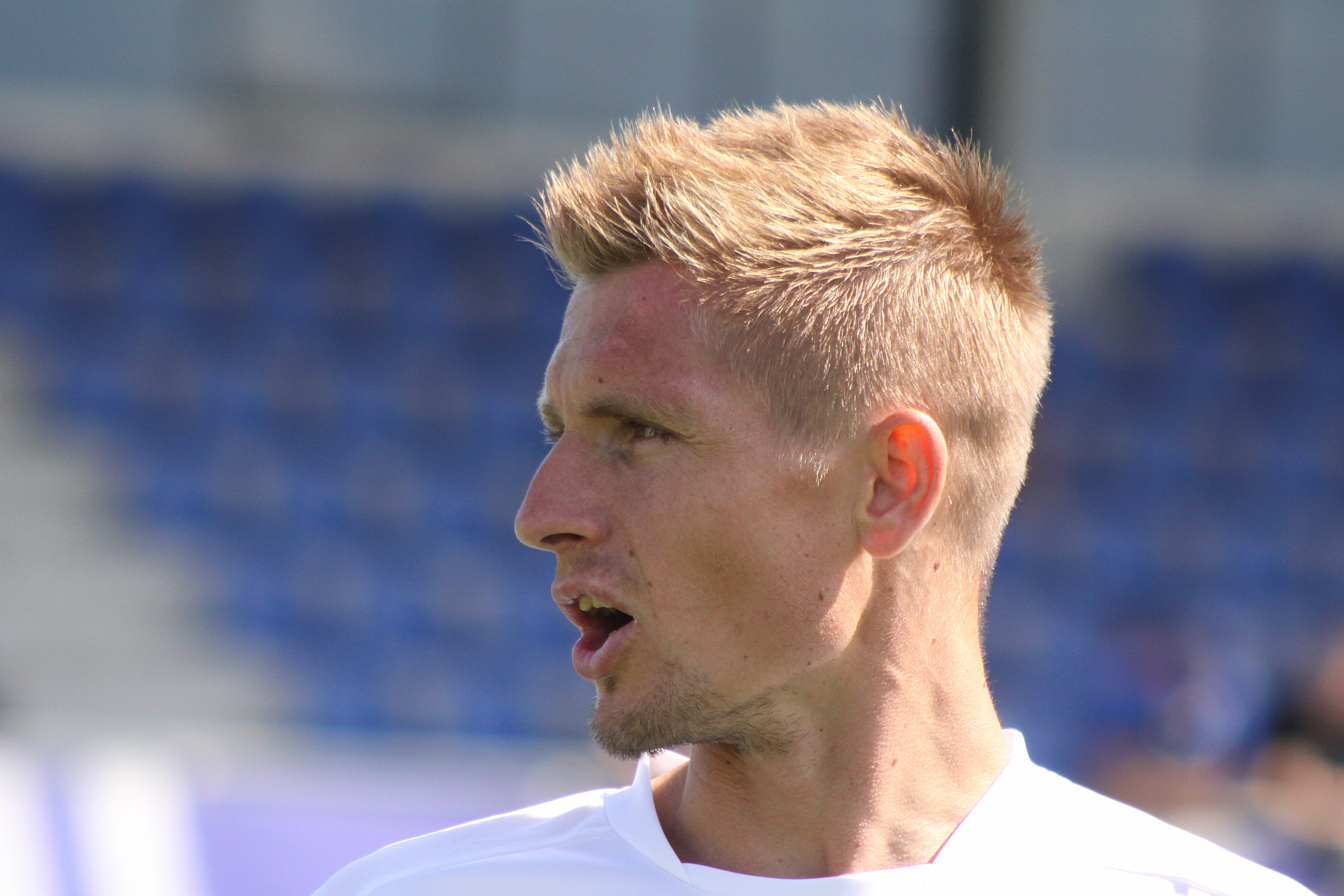
- Wichniarek in 2009

Personal information
- Date of birth: 28 February 1977 (age 49)
- Place of birth: Poznań, Poland
- Height: 1.83 m (6 ft 0 in)
- Position: Forward

Youth career
- 1988–1992: SKS 13 Poznań
- Lech Poznań

Senior career*
Years	Team	Apps	(Gls)
1992–1997	Lech Poznań	65	(4)
1996	→ Górnik Konin (loan)		
1997–1999	Widzew Łódź	57	(28)
1999–2003	Arminia Bielefeld	101	(50)
2003–2006	Hertha BSC	44	(4)
2006–2009	Arminia Bielefeld	111	(33)
2009–2010	Hertha BSC	19	(0)
2010	Lech Poznań	7	(0)
2011	FC Ingolstadt	0	(0)
Total		404	(119)

International career
1999–2008	Poland	17	(4)
- * Club domestic league appearances and goals

Artur Mikołaj Wichniarek (Polish pronunciation: [ˈartur vixˈɲarɛk], born 28 February 1977) is a Polish former professional footballer who played as a striker. Having established himself in the Ekstraklasa with Widzew Łódź, Wichniarek moved to Germany in 1999 to join Bundesliga club Arminia Bielefeld. Good performances at Arminia Bielefeld earned him a move to Hertha BSC where he did not become a regular starter. He returned to Arminia Bielefeld in 2006. After three years, he spent another season at Hertha BSC.

== Career ==
=== Early career in Poland ===
Wichniarek started his professional career at Lech Poznań in 1992–93 season. The following season, he made his Ekstraklasa debut, however, he was not able to secure a place in the starting eleven. In the spring of 1996 was loaned to II liga club Górnik Konin. Upon his return to his home club he managed to win the manager's confidence and in the following 1996–97 season he played 30 times, albeit scoring only four goals. In 1998, Wichniarek joined Widzew Łódź, where he played until 1999, appearing 57 times and scoring 28 goals all together, most of them in the 1998–99 season.

=== Arminia Bielefeld ===
His talent drew the attention of Arminia Bielefeld's directors, who brought him to Bielefeld, where he impressed the fans, becoming the club's leading player and best striker. In 2001–02 season he won the title of 2. Bundesliga top scorer, which earned him the nickname King Arthur.

=== Hertha BSC ===
Hertha BSC took notice and in 2003 he moved to Olympiastadion, however, he usually appeared only as a sub. After two seasons in Berlin, in the beginning of 2006, with 44 appearances and four goals on his sheet, he moved back to Arminia Bielefeld.

=== Return to Bielefeld ===
Wichniarek became one of Arminia's dominant players, scoring 33 goals in three seasons. Wichniarek was named the Bundesliga's Footballer of the Month in August 2008.

=== Second stint at Hertha ===
On 3 July 2009, Wichniarek left the newly relegated Arminia Bielefeld and returned to former club Hertha BSC signing a two-year contract. After the relegation of Hertha BSC, Wichniarek was released from his contract on 15 June 2010.

=== Return to Lech Poznań ===
Wichniarek signed a one-year contract with first club Lech Poznań on 30 June 2010. His contract was terminated by Lech Poznań on 3 November 2010.

== International career ==
Wichniarek made his first appearance for the Poland national team on 3 March 1999. The fixture was against Armenia where the Poles won 1–0. Wichniarek was not among the manager's favorites and his occasional appearances were usually limited to friendlies. His first international goal was at the expense of the Czech Republic national team on 28 April 1999. All together, he appeared in 17 international matches and four of his shots found their way into the opponents' net. His last significant cap was against Estonia in Tallinn, where he scored one of the two goals for the winners.

=== International goals ===
Scores and results list Poland's goal tally first, score column indicates score after each Wichniarek goal.

List of international goals scored by Artur Wichniarek
No.	Date	Venue	Opponent	Score	Result	Competition
1	28 April 1999	Stadion Wojska Polskiego, Warsaw, Poland	Czech Republic	2–0	2–1	Friendly
2	9 June 1999	Stade Josy Barthel, Luxembourg City, Luxembourg	Luxembourg	2–0	3–2	UEFA Euro 2000 qualifying
3	6 June 2003	Stadion Poznań, Poznań, Poland	Kazakhstan	1–0	3–0	Friendly
4	20 August 2003	A. Le Coq Arena, Tallinn, Estonia	Estonia	2–0	2–1	Friendly
