= Jean-Paul Girres =

Luxembourgish footballer

Personal information
- Full name: Jean-Paul Girres
- Date of birth: 6 January 1961 (age 65)
- Position: Midfielder

Senior career*
Years	Team	Apps	(Gls)
1977–1983	Union Luxembourg		
1983–1991	Avenir Beggen		
1991–1992	Swift Hesperange		

International career
1980–1992	Luxembourg	58	(2)
- * Club domestic league appearances and goals

Jean-Paul Girres (born 6 January 1961) is a Luxembourgish former footballer who played as a midfielder. He represented the Luxembourg national football team and three club sides.

== Club career ==
Girres began playing for Union Luxembourg in 1977 before moving to Avenir Beggen in 1983. He won two Luxembourg National Division titles and two Luxembourg Cups with Avenir Beggen. In 1991, he joined Swift Hesperange and subsequently retired in 1992.

== International career ==
Girres first played for Luxembourg in 1980 in a defeat against Yugoslavia. He went on to appear 58 times for Luxembourg and scored two goals in his twelve-year international career.

== International goals ==
Scores and results list Luxembourg's goal tally first, score column indicates score after each Girres goal.

International goals by date, venue, opponent, score, result and competition
No.	Date	Venue	Opponent	Score	Result	Competition
1	31 October 1990	Stade Municipal, Luxembourg City, Luxembourg	Germany	1–3	2–3	UEFA Euro 1992 qualifying
2	25 March 1992	Stade Municipal, Luxembourg City, Luxembourg	Turkey	1–2	2–3	Friendly match

== Honours ==
- Luxembourg National Division: 2

1983–84, 1985–86

- Luxembourg Cup: 2

1983–84, 1986–87
