= Kevin Malget =

Luxembourgish footballer

Personal information
- Date of birth: 15 January 1991 (age 35)
- Place of birth: Wiltz, Luxembourg
- Position: Centre-back

Team information
- Current team: Jeunesse Useldange

Youth career
- 2007–2008: Alemannia Aachen

Senior career*
Years	Team	Apps	(Gls)
2009–2011	Alemannia Aachen II	10	(1)
2011–2019	F91 Dudelange	130	(11)
2019–2020	Virton	20	(1)
2020–2023	Swift Hesperange	58	(3)
2023–2025	Wiltz	33	(2)
2025–	Jeunesse Useldange	0	(0)

International career^{‡}
2009	Luxembourg U19	3	(0)
2009–2011	Luxembourg U21	6	(0)
2010–	Luxembourg	36	(3)
- * Club domestic league appearances and goals as of 6 June 2026 ‡ National team caps and goals as of 9 September 2021(UTC)

Kevin Malget (born 15 January 1991) is a Luxembourgish international footballer who plays club football for Jeunesse Useldange as a centre-back.

== Career ==
On 1 June 2019 it was confirmed that Malget had joined Belgian club R.E. Virton.

== Personal life ==
Malget's father, Théo, was also a footballer.

== International career ==
=== International goals ===
Scores and results list Luxembourg's goal tally first.

No	Date	Venue	Opponent	Score	Result	Competition
1.	4 June 2017	Stade Josy Barthel, Luxembourg City, Luxembourg	Albania	2–1	2–1	Friendly
2.	22 March 2018	Centenary Stadium, Ta' Qali, Malta	Malta	1–0	1–0	Friendly
3.	8 September 2018	Stade Josy Barthel, Luxembourg City, Luxembourg	Moldova	1–0	4–0	2018–19 UEFA Nations League D
