= Michal Bílek =

Czech footballer and manager

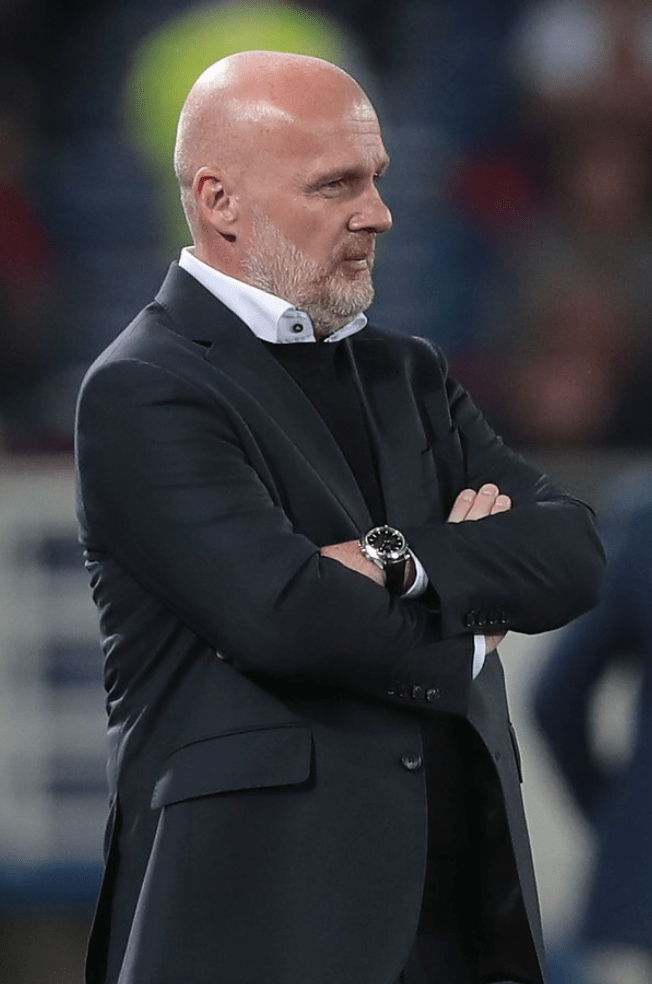
- Bílek as coach of Kazakhstan in 2019

Personal information
- Date of birth: 13 April 1965 (age 61)
- Place of birth: Prague, Czechoslovakia
- Height: 1.77 m (5 ft 9 1/2 in)
- Position: Midfielder

Team information
- Current team: Czech Republic U21 (manager)

Youth career
- 1973–1982: Sparta Prague

Senior career*
Years	Team	Apps	(Gls)
1982–1983	Sparta Prague	13	(0)
1984–1985	RH Cheb	50	(4)
1986–1990	Sparta Prague	135	(32)
1990–1992	Real Betis	59	(11)
1992–1993	Sparta Prague	28	(5)
1993–1996	Viktoria Žižkov	91	(20)
1996–1998	Sparta Prague	15	(1)
1998–2000	FK Teplice	76	(11)
Total		467	(84)

International career
1983–1985	Czechoslovakia U21	15	(1)
1987–1992	Czechoslovakia	32	(11)
1992–1995	Czech Republic	3	(0)

Managerial career
- 2001: FK Teplice
- 2001–2002: Cartaginés
- 2002–2003: Czech Republic U19
- 2003–2006: Chmel Blšany
- 2006: Viktoria Plzeň
- 2006–2008: Sparta Prague
- 2008–2009: Ružomberok
- 2009–2013: Czech Republic
- 2014: Dinamo Tbilisi
- 2016–2017: Jihlava
- 2018–2019: Zlín
- 2019–2020: Kazakhstan
- 2020: Astana
- 2021–2023: Viktoria Plzeň
- 2025–: Czech Republic U21
- * Club domestic league appearances and goals

Michal Bílek (born 13 April 1965) is a football manager and former player who serves as head coach of the Czech Republic U21 national team. He led the Czech Republic national football team for four years between 2009 and 2013. As a player, he represented Czechoslovakia and the Czech Republic at international level. His playing position was right midfielder.

== Playing career ==
During his career, Bílek was mainly associated with Sparta Prague, which he represented on four separate occasions, starting with the first team aged only 17. He played in the Czechoslovak First League for RH Cheb in the mid-1980s before returning to Sparta.

On 27 December 1990, Bílek transferred to Spanish club Real Betis, being relegated in his first season, and returning to Sparta after another year. He played for FK Viktoria Žižkov and FK Teplice until 2000, appearing once again for his main club in between.

Bílek played for Czechoslovakia and briefly for the independent Czech Republic. For both teams, he played a total of 35 matches and scored 11 goals, representing the former at the 1990 FIFA World Cup as an offensive mainstay – scoring twice for the quarterfinalists. His debut for Czechoslovakia occurred in 1987 during a friendly match against Poland in Bratislava.

== Managerial career ==
Immediately after ending his playing career, Bílek began coaching, precisely with Teplice. After a brief stint in Costa Rica, he returned home, going on to manage FK Chmel Blšany, FC Viktoria Plzeň and MFK Ružomberok. In 2006, Bílek took charge of Sparta, replacing Stanislav Griga. He went on to win the Czech First League in his first season and finish second in the following season. Bílek resigned from his position at Sparta in May 2008.

In late October 2009, having coached the nation's U19 team seven years earlier, former assistant Bílek was appointed new coach of the senior team, following Ivan Hašek's resignation after the failure to qualify for the 2010 FIFA World Cup. He was replaced as national team coach in September 2013 after nearly four years in the role by Josef Pešice.

=== International goals ===
Scores and results list; Czechoslovakia's goal tally first.

No	Date	Venue	Opponent	Score	Result	Competition
1.	27 October 1987	Tehelné pole, Bratislava, Czechoslovakia	Poland	3–1	3–1	Friendly
2.	11 November 1987	Letná Stadium, Prague, Czechoslovakia	Wales	2–0	2–0	UEFA Euro 1988 qualification
3.	20 September 1988	Letná Stadium, Prague, Czechoslovakia	Austria	2–0	4–2	Friendly
4.	9 May 1989	Letná Stadium, Prague, Czechoslovakia	Luxembourg	4–0	4–0	1990 FIFA World Cup qualification
5.	5 September 1989	Štadión pod Zoborom, Nitra, Czechoslovakia	Romania	2–0	2–0	Friendly
6.	6 October 1989	Letná Stadium, Prague, Czechoslovakia	Portugal	1–0	2–1	1990 FIFA World Cup qualification
7.	6 October 1989	Letná Stadium, Prague, Czechoslovakia	Portugal	2–1	2–1	1990 FIFA World Cup qualification
8.	25 October 1989	Letná Stadium, Prague, Czechoslovakia	Switzerland	2–0	3–0	1990 FIFA World Cup qualification
9.	10 June 1990	Stadio Comunale, Florence, Italy	United States	2–0	5–1	1990 FIFA World Cup
10.	15 June 1990	Stade Comunale, Florence, Italy	Austria	1–0	1–0	1990 FIFA World Cup
11.	22 April 1992	Strahov Stadium, Prague, Czechoslovakia	Germany	1–1	1–1	Friendly

== Managerial statistics ==
As of match played 27 May 2023

Team	Nat	From	To	Record				
Team	Nat	From	To	G	W	D	L	Win %
Teplice	(Czech Republic)	20 March 2001	30 June 2001	10	2	1	7	20.00
Czech Republic U-19	(Czech Republic)	1 July 2003	30 June 2004	4	1	1	2	25.00
Chmel Blšany	(Czech Republic)	10 October 2003	30 June 2006	80	20	26	34	25.00
Viktoria Plzeň	(Czech Republic)	1 July 2006	2 September 2006	5	2	2	1	40.00
Sparta Prague	(Czech Republic)	3 September 2006	30 June 2008	71	39	16	16	54.93
Ružomberok	(Slovakia)	1 July 2008	30 June 2009	33	12	11	10	36.36
Czech Republic	(Czech Republic)	20 October 2009	11 September 2013	41	16	10	15	39.02
Dinamo Tbilisi	(Georgia (country))	1 July 2014	31 July 2014	2	0	0	2	0.00
Vysočina	(Czech Republic)	14 September 2016	12 April 2017	13	4	2	7	30.77
Zlín	(Czech Republic)	1 June 2018	17 January 2019	22	11	3	8	50.00
Kazakhstan	(Kazakhstan)	18 January 2019	19 November 2020	18	5	3	10	27.78
Astana	(Kazakhstan)	14 January 2020	26 August 2020	7	4	1	2	57.14
Viktoria Plzeň	(Czech Republic)	10 May 2021	30 June 2023	97	56	15	26	57.73
Total				402	172	91	139	42.79

== Honors ==
FC Viktoria Plzeň

- Czech First League: 2021–22

Individual

- Czech First League Manager of the Season: 2021–22
