= Marcel Bossi =

Luxembourgish footballer

Personal information
- Date of birth: 14 January 1960 (age 66)
- Position: Defender

Senior career*
Years	Team	Apps	(Gls)
1977–1989	Progrès Niederkorn		
1989–1992	Jeunesse Esch		
1992–1994	Progrès Niederkorn		

International career
1980–1993	Luxembourg	61	(0)
- * Club domestic league appearances and goals

Marcel Bossi (born 14 January 1960) is a retired Luxembourgish football defender.
