= Michael Glowatzky =

German former footballer (born 1960)

Personal information
- Date of birth: 1 July 1960 (age 66)
- Place of birth: East Germany
- Height: 1.85 m (6 ft 1 in)
- Position: Forward

Senior career*
Years	Team	Apps	(Gls)
1980–1983	Sachsenring Zwickau	45	(5)
1983–1988	FC Karl-Marx-Stadt	109	(32)
1988–1989	Sachsenring Zwickau	15	(4)
1989–1991	SpVgg Bayreuth	47	(15)
1991–1994	1. FC Schweinfurt 05	75	(21)

International career
1984–1986	East Germany	9	(1)
- * Club domestic league appearances and goals

Michael Glowatzky (born 1 July 1960) is a German former footballer.

Glowatzky played 158 matches in the East German top flight where he scored 37 goals. The forward made in the mid-1980s into the squad of the East Germany national team where he scored one goal in nine appearances.
