= Thomas Wolf (footballer) =

Luxembourgish footballer

Personal information
- Date of birth: 28 January 1963 (age 63)
- Place of birth: Germany
- Position: Defender

Senior career*
Years	Team	Apps	(Gls)
1985–1988	Avenir Beggen		
1988–1994	Union Luxembourg		
1994–1998	CS Grevenmacher		

International career
1991–1995	Luxembourg	19	(2)
- * Club domestic league appearances and goals

Thomas Wolf (born 28 January 1963) is a retired Luxembourgish football defender. He played for the Luxembourgish national team .
