= Ralf Minge =

German footballer and manager

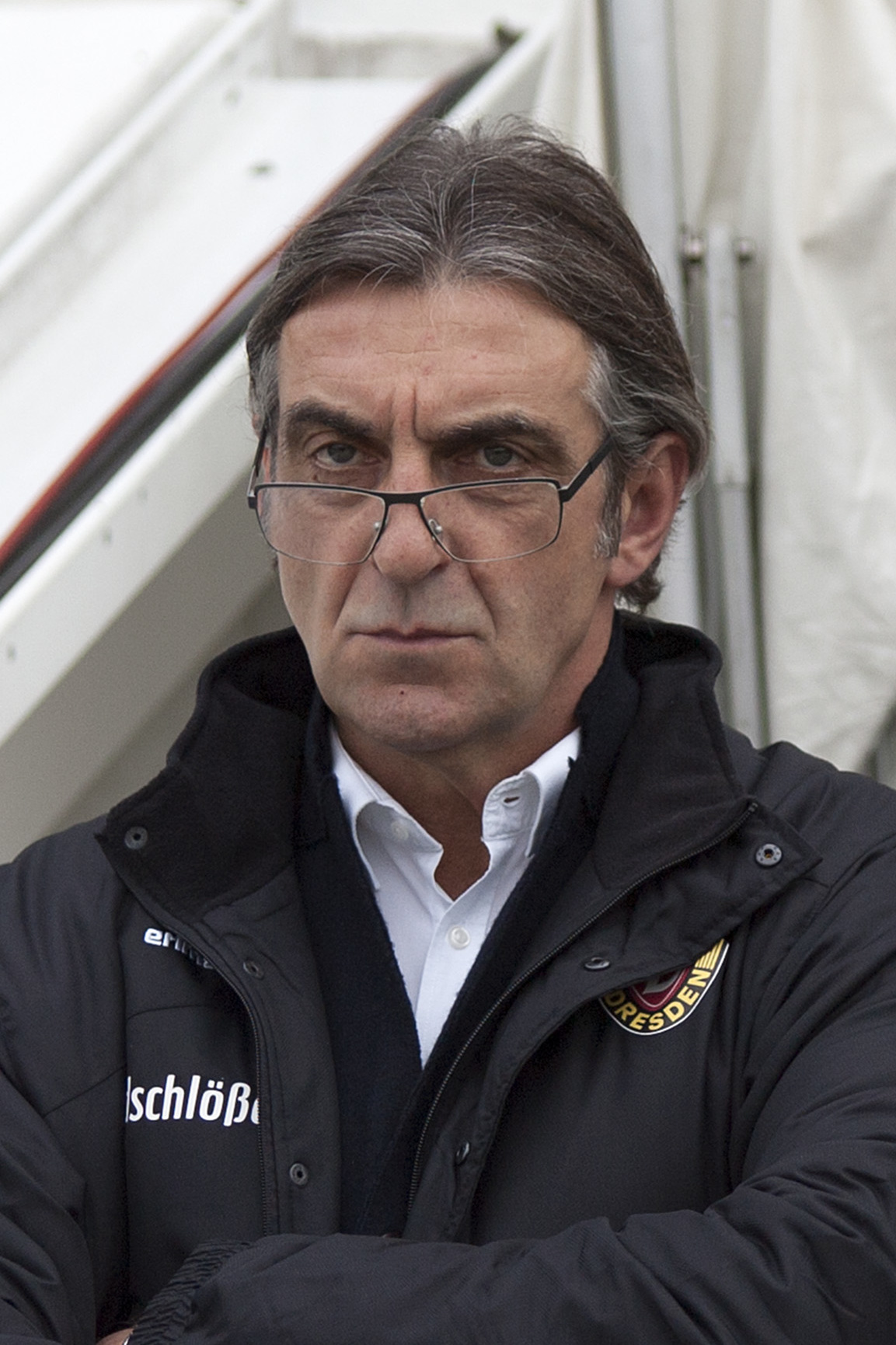
- Minge with Dresden in 2015.

Personal information
- Full name: Ralf Minge
- Date of birth: 8 October 1960 (age 66)
- Place of birth: Elsterwerda, East Germany
- Position: Striker

Team information
- Current team: Dynamo Dresden (Sporting Director)

Youth career
- 1969–1972: BSG Stahl Prösen
- 1972–1978: TSG Gröditz

Senior career*
Years	Team	Apps	(Gls)
1978–1980	TSG Gröditz		
1980–1991	Dynamo Dresden	222	(103)
Total		222	(103)

International career
1983–1989	East Germany	36	(8)

Managerial career
- 1993: Dynamo Dresden
- 1995: Dynamo Dresden
- 1995–1996: Erzgebirge Aue
- 2000–2005: Bayer Leverkusen II
- 2006–2007: Georgia U21
- 2010–2011: Germany U20
- 2012–2014: Bayer Leverkusen II
- * Club domestic league appearances and goals

Ralf Minge (born 8 October 1960) is a German footballer former coach and player who works as sporting director of Dynamo Dresden.

He was an international for East Germany, and spent his entire professional career with Dynamo Dresden.

== Playing career ==
A striker, Minge joined Dynamo Dresden in 1980, signing from TSG Gröditz, and spent the next eleven years with the club, winning two East German titles and four cups. He scored 103 league goals for the club, and ranks as the club's third top scorer, behind Hans-Jürgen Kreische and Torsten Gütschow. He retired in 1991, at the end of the last ever DDR-Oberliga season. At international level, Minge won 36 caps between 1983 and 1989, scoring eight times.

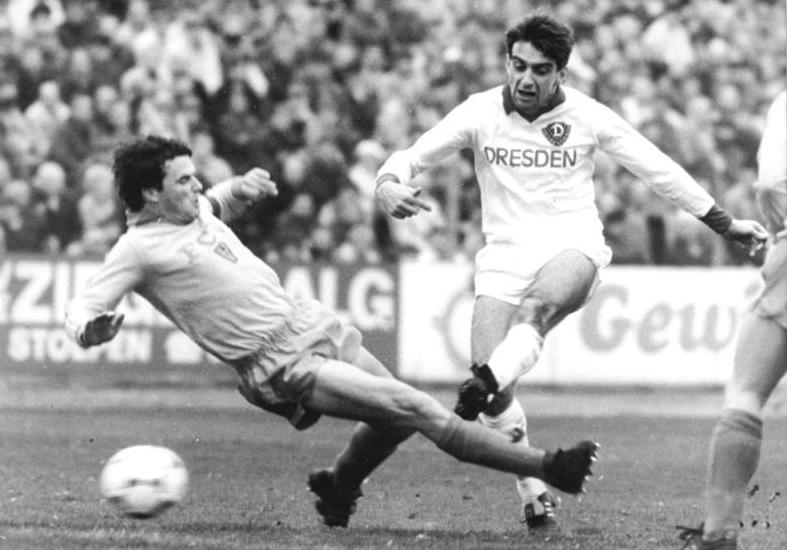
Ralf Minge (right) in a 1987 match against Vorwärts Frankfurt/Oder.

== Coaching and managerial career ==
After retiring from the game, Minge had a short spell on the board at Dynamo, before serving on the coaching staff for three years, during which he briefly became the acting manager on two occasions, in 1993 and 1995, the last of which saw Dynamo's relegation from the Bundesliga. This event precipitated the club's temporary descent into amateur leagues, caused by severe financial misdealings by then-president Rolf-Jürgen Otto.

Minge then left Dynamo and, in July 1995, took up the post as manager of Erzgebirge Aue, where he served for ten months. His next job came in 1998, assisting Toni Schumacher at Fortuna Köln. In December 1999, Schumacher was sacked, and Minge briefly stepped in as manager, but left by the end of the month out of loyalty to his former colleague.

In 2000, he joined Bayer Leverkusen, taking over their reserve team before the appointment of Klaus Toppmöller saw Minge promoted to the role of assistant manager. The club was hugely successful during this time, especially during the 2001–02 season, reaching the finals of both the DFB-Pokal and the UEFA Champions League, and finishing second in the Bundesliga. This success would not last, however, as many of the star players left the team, ultimately leading to Toppmöller losing his job. Minge eventually dropped back to managing Bayer Leverkusen II, before resigning at the end of the 2004–05 season.

He returned to Dresden to study psychology, but his break from football was to be short-lived, as in January 2006, he reunited with Klaus Toppmöller, this time as assistant coach of the Georgia national team, while also managing the under-21s. In September 2006, he rejoined the Dynamo Dresden board, and in January 2008, took up the role as managing sports director. In March 2009, he resigned from the board, citing discontent with contracts signed in relation to the club's new stadium. He briefly coached the German under-20 and under-19 football team respectively in 2010 and 2011.

In 2014, Minge returned to Dynamo Dresden once more, again filling the position of managing sports director. He oversaw the club's return to the 2. Bundesliga in 2016, however, due to burnout caused by his intense schedule, had to take a medical leave of absence from March to July 2018. In June 2020, it was announced that Minge's contract would not be renewed due to continually poor performances by the club's main squad, which, at the time of the announcement of his departure, ranked last in the league's standings.

== Career statistics ==
=== International ===
Scores and results list East Germany's goal tally first, score column indicates score after each Minge goal.

List of international goals scored by Ralf Minge
No.	Date	Venue	Opponent	Score	Result	Competition	Ref.
1	28 March 1984	Steigerwaldstadion, Erfurt, Germany	Czechoslovakia	1–0	2–1	Friendly	
2	29 August 1984	Stadion der Freundschaft, Gera, Germany	Romania	1–1	2–1	Friendly	
3	17 November 1984	Stade de la Frontière, Esch-sur-Alzette, Luxembourg	Luxembourg	3–0	5–0	1986 FIFA World Cup qualification	
4	17 November 1984	Stade de la Frontière, Esch-sur-Alzette, Luxembourg	Luxembourg	5–0	5–0	1986 FIFA World Cup qualification	
5	18 May 1985	Karl-Liebknecht-Stadion, Potsdam, Germany	Luxembourg	1–0	3–1	1986 FIFA World Cup qualification	
6	18 May 1985	Karl-Liebknecht-Stadion, Potsdam, Germany	Luxembourg	2–0	3–1	1986 FIFA World Cup qualification	
7	25 March 1987	Ali Sami Yen Stadium, Istanbul, Turkey	Turkey	1–0	1–3	Friendly	
8	3 June 1987	Laugardalsvöllur, Reykjavík, Iceland	Iceland	1–0	6–0	UEFA Euro 1988 qualification	

== Honours ==
Dynamo Dresden

- East German Cup: 1982, 1984, 1985, 1990
- East German Champion: 1989, 1990
