= Rumen Hristov (footballer) =

Bulgarian footballer

Personal information
- Date of birth: 22 March 1975 (age 51)
- Place of birth: Plovdiv, Bulgaria
- Position: Forward

Senior career*
Years	Team	Apps	(Gls)
1992–1995	Maritsa Plovdiv	52	(14)
1995–1996	CSKA Sofia	30	(5)
1997	Maritsa Plovdiv	14	(2)
1997	Botev Plovdiv	12	(1)
1997–2000	CSKA Sofia	56	(14)
2000–2002	Loko Sofia	37	(5)
2002	Dobrudzha Dobrich	6	(1)
2003	FC Chernozemen	17	(8)
2003–2004	Maritsa Plovdiv	24	(9)

International career
1995-1999	Bulgaria	4	(1)
- * Club domestic league appearances and goals

Rumen Hristov (Bulgarian: Румен Христов) (born 22 March 1975) is a retired Bulgarian footballer.

== Career ==
Born in Plovdiv, Hristov started his career with local outfit Maritsa Plovdiv. His most successful period was with CSKA Sofia - he won a Bulgarian Cup with the "redmen" in 1999 and became vice-champion of Bulgaria in 2000. He also earned a championship bronze medal in 1998. A Plovdiv football legend, Hristov's nickname is Romário. He debuted for the national side in 1995.

=== International goal ===
Scores and results list Bulgaria's goal tally first.

No.	Date	Venue	Opponent	Score	Result	Competition
1	9 October 1999	Bulgarian Army Stadium, Sofia, Bulgaria	Luxembourg	3–0	3–0	UEFA Euro 2000 qualifying
