= Marcel Di Domenico =

Luxembourgish footballer

Personal information
- Date of birth: 17 June 1955
- Place of birth: Differdange, Luxembourg
- Position: Striker

Senior career*
Years	Team	Apps	(Gls)
1972–1973	Red Boys Differdange		
1973–1975	Metz	4	(1)
1975–1976	Hazebrouck	33	(11)
1976–198x	Red Boys Differdange		
198x–198x	Spora Luxembourg		

International career
1973–1982	Luxembourg	38	(2)
- * Club domestic league appearances and goals

Marcel Di Domenico (born 17 June 1955) was a Luxembourgish footballer who played as a striker.

== Club career ==
He played for Red Boys Differdange, Metz, Hazebrouck and Spora Luxembourg.

== International career ==
A striker, Di Domenico won 38 caps for Luxembourg over a period of nine years, and scored two goals in the process.
