= Cees Bakker =

Dutch association football referee

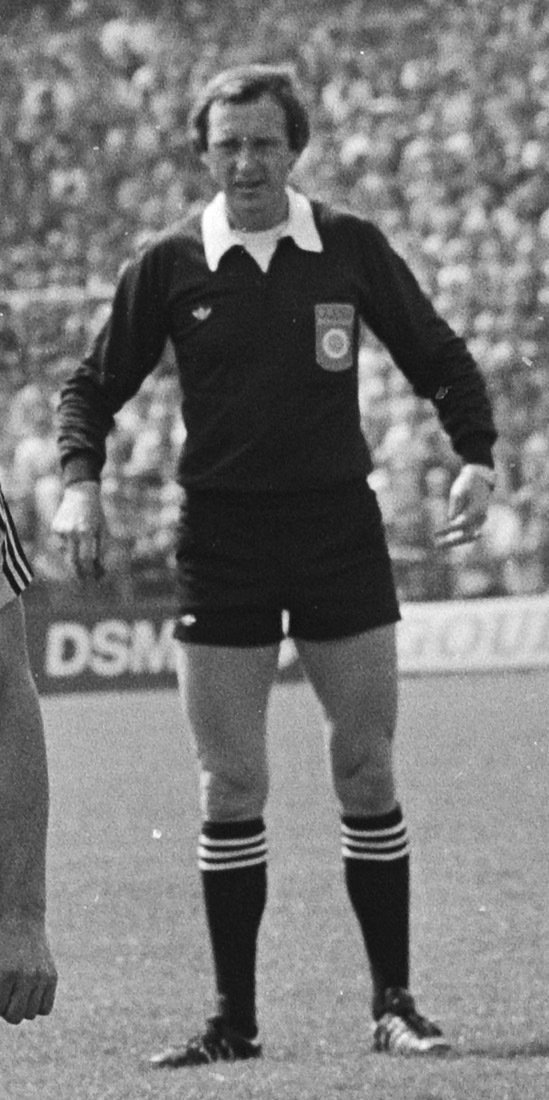
- Cees Bakker in 1982
- Full name: Cornelius A. Bakker
- Born: 17 March 1945 (age 81)
- Other occupation: Referee observer

Domestic
Years	League	Role
1979–1992	Dutch Eredivisie	Referee

International
Years	League	Role
1988–1992	FIFA-listed	Referee

Cornelius A. "Cees" Bakker (born 17 March 1945) is a retired football referee and referee observer from the Netherlands. In 2015, Bakker was named bondsridder of the Royal Dutch Football Association (KNVB), an honorary title for his service to Dutch football.

Bakker was promoted onto the KNVB's B-list in 1975. He refereed his first Eredivise match on 25 August 1979, Vitesse Arnhem's 2–0 defeat at Excelsior Rotterdam. He was appointed to the FIFA International Referees List in 1988, but had already taken charge of Luxembourg's 4–0 home defeat by England in November 1983, and the first leg of the 1984 European Competition for Women's Football Final in May 1984.

In 1992 Bakker retired from active refereeing due to a knee injury. The KNVB nominated Dick Jol as his replacement on the FIFA list.

Preceded by no previous competition	1984 European Competition for Women's Football Final (Netherlands) Cees Bakker (Belgium) Ignace Goris	Succeeded by (Finland) Eero Aho
