= Gyula Hajszán =

Hungarian footballer

Personal information
- Full name: Gyula Hajszán
- Date of birth: 9 October 1961 (age 65)
- Place of birth: Sopron, Hungary
- Height: 1.75 m (5 ft 9 in)
- Position: Midfielder

Youth career
- –1978: Haladás
- 1978–1979: Soproni SE

Senior career*
Years	Team	Apps	(Gls)
1979–1989	Győr	247	(61)
1989–1991	MSV Duisburg	37	(2)
1993	Tennis Borussia Berlin	3	(0)
1994–1996	Győr	53	(7)
Total		340	(70)

International career
1982–1994	Hungary	37	(4)
- * Club domestic league appearances and goals

Gyula Hajszán (born 9 October 1961, in Sopron) is a retired Hungarian football player.

He made his debut for the Hungary national team in 1982, and got 37 caps and 4 goals until 1994. He was a participant at the 1986 FIFA World Cup in Mexico, where Hungary failed to progress from the group stage.

== National team statistics ==
Hungary national team
Year	Apps	Goals
1982	1	0
1983	8	2
1984	6	1
1985	4	1
1986	4	0
1987	4	0
1988	4	0
1989	5	0
1994	1	0
Total	37	4
