= Jean-Pierre Vanek =

Luxembourgish footballer

Personal information
- Full name: Jean-Pierre Vanek
- Date of birth: 19 January 1969 (age 57)
- Place of birth: Luxembourg
- Position: Defender

Senior career*
Years	Team	Apps	(Gls)
1988–1991	FC Etzella Ettelbruck		
1991–2000	FC Avenir Beggen		
2000–2002	F91 Dudelange		

International career^{‡}
1994–2002	Luxembourg	35	(2)
- * Club domestic league appearances and goals ‡ National team caps and goals as of 23 February 2012

Jean-Pierre Vanek (born 19 January 1969) is a Luxembourgish footballer. He retired from playing in 2002.

== International career ==
He is a member of the Luxembourg national football team from 1994 to 2002.
