= Tomasz Iwan =

Polish footballer (born 1971)

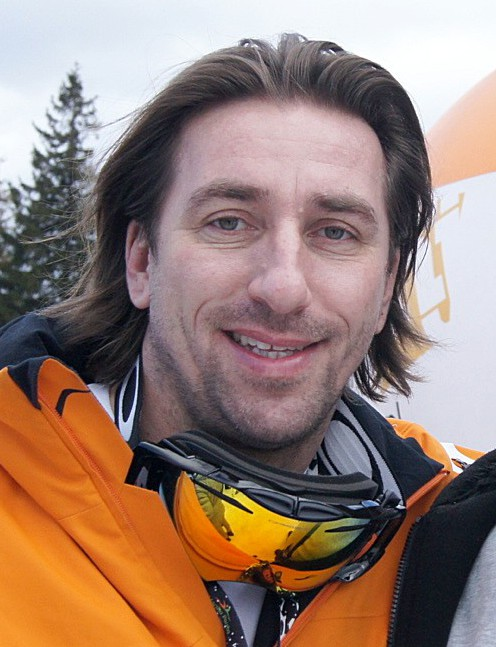
- Iwan in 2012

Personal information
- Date of birth: 12 June 1971 (age 55)
- Place of birth: Słupsk, Poland
- Position: Midfielder

Youth career
- Jantar Ustka
- Gryf Słupsk

Senior career*
Years	Team	Apps	(Gls)
1991–1992	Olimpia Poznań	17	(1)
1992–1993	ŁKS Łódź	10	(0)
1993–1994	Warta Poznań	31	(7)
1994–1995	Roda JC	30	(4)
1995–1997	Feyenoord	45	(3)
1997–2001	PSV	60	(4)
2001	Trabzonspor	0	(0)
2001	RBC Roosendaal	10	(1)
2001–2002	Austria Wien	12	(0)
2002–2005	Admira Wacker	81	(14)
2005–2006	Lech Poznań	16	(3)

International career
1995–2002	Poland	40	(4)
- * Club domestic league appearances and goals

Tomasz Iwan (born 12 June 1971) is a Polish former professional footballer who played as a midfielder for a number of clubs throughout Europe, such as Olimpia Poznań, ŁKS Łódź, Warta Poznań and Lech Poznań in Poland, Roda JC, Feyenoord, PSV and RBC Roosendaal in the Netherlands, Trabzonspor in Turkey and Austria Wien and Admira Wacker in Austria. He also represented the Polish national side, earning 40 caps.

From 2013 to 2018, he was the director of operations of the Poland national team.

== Honours ==
PSV Eindhoven

- Eredivisie: 1999–2000
- Dutch Super Cup: 1998

Individual

- Polish Newcomer of the Year: 1995
