= Jeannot Reiter =

Luxembourgish footballer

Personal information
- Full name: Jeannot Reiter
- Date of birth: 14 October 1958 (age 68)
- Place of birth: Luxembourg
- Position: Striker

Senior career*
Years	Team	Apps	(Gls)
1977–1982	FC Etzella Ettelbruck	?	(?)
1982–1984	FC Chalon	41	(19)
1984–1985	Guingamp	32	(10)
1985–1986	FC Montceau Bourgogne	25	(11)
1986–1991	Spora Luxembourg	?	(?)

International career
1978–1989	Luxembourg	46	(6)

Managerial career
- 1992–1994: Sporting Mertzig
- 1996–1997: F91 Dudelange
- 1997–2000: Progrès Niederkorn
- 2001–2002: Avenir Beggen
- 2003–2005: Union Luxembourg
- 2005–2006: Swift Hesperange
- 2007-2009: Berdenia Berbourg
- 2009–2010: Etzella Ettelbruck
- 2011–2012: US Mondorf-les-Bains
- 2013–2017: Jeunesse Junglinster
- 2017–2018: Avenir Beggen
- 2020–present: Jeunesse Junglinster
- * Club domestic league appearances and goals

Jeannot Reiter (born 14 October 1958) is a retired football striker.

During his club career, Reiter played for FC Etzella Ettelbruck, FC Chalon, Guingamp, FC Montceau Bourgogne and Spora Luxembourg. He also amassed 46 caps for the Luxembourg national team, scoring 6 goals.
