= Marc Birsens =

Luxembourgish footballer

Personal information
- Full name: Marc Birsens
- Date of birth: 17 September 1966 (age 60)
- Place of birth: Luxembourg
- Position: Defender

Senior career*
Years	Team	Apps	(Gls)
1986–1996	Union Luxembourg		
1996–1997	CS Grevenmacher		
1997–2000	Union Luxembourg		
2000–2002	US Rumelange		

International career^{‡}
1988–2000	Luxembourg	53	(1)
- * Club domestic league appearances and goals ‡ National team caps and goals as of 23 February 2012

Marc Birsens (born 17 September 1966) is a former football player from Luxembourg.

== International career ==
He was a member of the Luxembourg national football team from 1988 to 2000.
