= Robby Langers =

Luxembourgish footballer (born 1960)

Personal information
- Full name: Robert Langers
- Date of birth: 1 August 1960 (age 66)
- Place of birth: Luxembourg City, Luxembourg
- Height: 1.78 m (5 ft 10 in)
- Position: Striker

Senior career*
Years	Team	Apps	(Gls)
1979–1980	Union Luxembourg		(26)
1980–1982	Borussia Mönchengladbach	3	(0)
1982–1983	Marseille	15	(1)
1983–1984	Metz	7	(0)
1984–1986	Stade Quimpérois	74	(25)
1986–1988	Guingamp	44	(15)
1988–1989	Orléans	33	(27)
1989–1991	Nice	60	(24)
1991–1992	Cannes	19	(2)
1992–1993	Yverdon-Sport		
1993–1994	Etoile Carouge		
1994–1996	SV Eintracht Trier 05	26	(6)
1996–1997	F91 Dudelange	19	(6)
1997–1998	Union Luxembourg	17	(14)

International career
1980–1998	Luxembourg	73	(8)
- * Club domestic league appearances and goals

Robert 'Robby' Langers (born 1 August 1960) is a Luxembourgish former professional footballer who played as a striker. He was voted Luxembourgish Sportsman of the Year in 1987.

== Club career ==
Langers started his career at local side Union Luxembourg but was loaned to German Bundesliga outfit Borussia Mönchengladbach aged 20. After two seasons on the substitutes bench and in the reserves he moved to France to play for seven different teams in ten seasons, both in Ligue 1 and Ligue 2. While at US Orléans he became top goalscorer of Ligue 2. At Cannes he played alongside a youngster named Zinedine Zidane.

In 1992. Langers moved east to Swiss sides Yverdon-Sport and Etoile Carouge, then played with Eintracht Trier in Germany before returning home to play for F91 Dudelange and end his career in fashion by scoring 14 goals for his first club Union Luxembourg.

== International career ==
Langers made his debut for the Luxembourg national team in a September 1980 World Cup qualification match against Yugoslavia and won 73 caps for Luxembourg over a period of eighteen years, and scored eight goals in the process. He played in 35 FIFA World Cup qualification matches.

His international career coincided with two more of Luxembourg's most successful players: Guy Hellers and Carlo Weis. He played his final international game in May 1998, against Cameroon in which he came on as a second-half substitute and was himself substituted a few minutes later in his honour.

== Career statistics ==
Scores and results list Luxembourg's goal tally first, score column indicates score after each Langers goal.

List of international goals scored by Robby Langers
No.	Date	Venue	Opponent	Score	Result	Competition
1	18 May 1985	Karl-Liebknecht-Stadion, Babelsberg, East Germany	East Germany	1–3	1–3	1986 World Cup qualifying
2	25 September 1985	Stade Municipal, Luxembourg (city), Luxembourg	Bulgaria	1–3	1–3	1986 World Cup qualifying
3	30 April 1987	Stade Municipal, Luxembourg (city), Luxembourg	Bulgaria	1–2	1–4	1988 Euro qualifying
4	21 September 1988	Stade Municipal, Luxembourg (city), Luxembourg	Switzerland	1–4	1–4	1990 World Cup qualifying
5	31 October 1990	Stade Municipal, Luxembourg (city), Luxembourg	Germany	2–3	2–3	1992 Euro qualifying
6	14 February 1995	Yud-Alef Stadium, Ashdod, Israel	Israel	1–3	2–4	Friendly
7	14 February 1995	Yud-Alef Stadium, Ashdod, Israel	Israel	2–3	2–4	Friendly
8	8 October 1996	Stade Josy Barthel, Luxembourg (city), Luxembourg	Bulgaria	1–1	1–2	1998 World Cup qualifying

== Honours ==
Metz

- Coupe de France: 1983–84

Individual

- Luxembourgish Sportsman of the Year: 1987
