= Théo Malget =

Luxembourgish footballer

Personal information
- Date of birth: 2 March 1961 (age 65)
- Position: Midfielder

Senior career*
Years	Team	Apps	(Gls)
1981–1985	FC Wiltz 71		
1985–1987	FC Avenir Beggen		
1987–1988	SC Birkenfeld		
1988–1995	FC Wiltz 71		

International career
- Luxembourg U21
1982–1993	Luxembourg	47	(3)

Managerial career
- 2008-2011: Sporting Mertzig
- 2016-2017: Jeunesse Canach (asst.)
- 2017: Munsbach (asst.)
- 2018: Munsbach
- 2020-: Etzella Ettelbruck (asst.)
- * Club domestic league appearances and goals

Théo Malget (born 2 March 1961) is a Luxembourgish retired international footballer who played club football for FC Wiltz 71 and FC Avenir Beggen, as a midfielder.

He is, as of August 2021, an assistant coach at Etzella Ettelbruck.

== Club career ==
Malget scored 93 goals in 238 matches for FC Wiltz.

== International career ==
He made his debut for Luxembourg in an April 1982 friendly match against France and earned a total of 47 caps, scoring 3 goals. His final international was an October 1993 World Cup qualification match away against Hungary.

== Personal life ==
Malget's son, Kevin, is also a professional footballer.
