= Guy Hellers =

Luxembourgish footballer and manager

Personal information
- Date of birth: 10 October 1964 (age 62)
- Place of birth: Luxembourg City, Luxembourg
- Height: 1.86 m (6 ft 1 in)
- Position: Midfielder

Youth career
- US Bascharage
- US Hollerich

Senior career*
Years	Team	Apps	(Gls)
1980–1982	Metz	0	(0)
1983–2000	Standard Liège	383	(30)

International career
1982–1997	Luxembourg	55	(2)

Managerial career
- 2004–2010: Luxembourg
- 2010–2011: F91 Dudelange (sporting director)
- 2011–2015: F91 Dudelange (head of youth sector)
- 2015: F91 Dudelange
- * Club domestic league appearances and goals

Guy Hellers (French pronunciation: [ɡi ɛ.lɛʁs]; born 10 October 1964) is a Luxembourgish football manager and former player, who played as a midfielder.

He was the head coach of the Luxembourg national team, having succeeded Dane Allan Simonsen in 2004.

In 2010, Hellers resigned as Luxembourg coach and was succeeded by Luc Holtz.

== Club career ==
Arguably Luxembourg's most successful player, Hellers shortly played for FC Metz but he spent the majority of his career at Standard Liège, where has been captain. He played 458 matches in total for them, scoring 37 goals. He was surprisingly dismissed by then manager Tomislav Ivic in September 1999 after some verbal clashes between coach and squad.

== International career ==
Hellers made his debut for Luxembourg in an October 1982 European Championship qualification match against Greece and went on to earn 55 caps, scoring 2 goals. He played in 27 FIFA World Cup qualification matches. His final international game was an October 1997 World Cup qualification match against Cyprus.

He scored the only goal in the upset match against the Czech Republic in 1995.

== Managerial career ==
His entire coaching career has been spent with the Luxembourg Football Federation, coaching at every youth level before becoming the manager of the senior national team.

== Career statistics ==
Scores and results list Luxembourg's goal tally first.

#	Date	Venue	Opponent	Score	Result	Competition
1	25 October 1989	Heysel Stadium, Brussels, Belgium	Belgium	1-1	1-1	1990 FIFA World Cup qualifying
2	7 June 1995	Stade Josy Barthel, Luxembourg (city), Luxembourg	Czech Republic	1-0	1-0	1996 Euro qualifying

== Managerial statistics ==
Team	From	To	Record				
Team	From	To	G	W	D	L	Win %
Luxembourg	2004	2010	47	3	9	35	6.38
F91 Dudelange	2015	2015	4	2	0	2	50.00
Total			51	5	9	37	9.80

== Honours ==
Standard Liège

- Belgian Cup: 1992–93
