= Stade de la Frontière =

Football stadium in Esch-sur-Alzette, Luxembourg

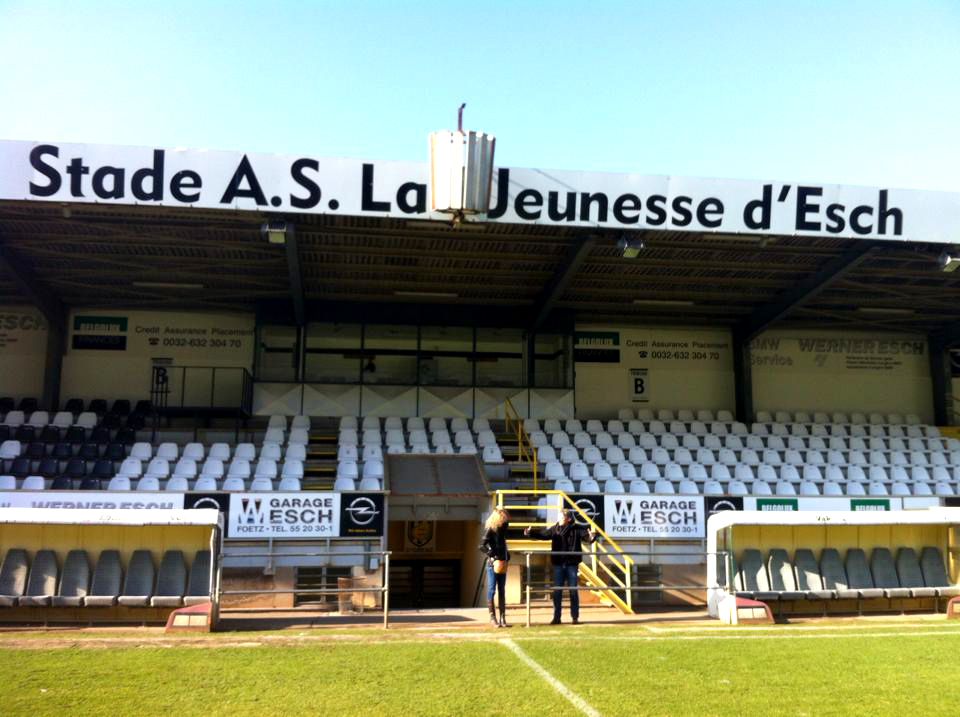
- Stade de la Frontière, Esch-sur-Alzette, Luxembourg
- Interactive map of Stade de la Frontière
- Full name: Stade de la Frontière
- Location: Esch-sur-Alzette, Luxembourg
- Coordinates: 49°29′9″N 5°58′37″E
- Capacity: 4,000
- Surface: grass

Construction
- Built: 1920

Tenant
- Jeunesse Esch

The Stade de la Frontière is a football stadium in Esch-sur-Alzette, Luxembourg. It is the home stadium of Jeunesse Esch. The stadium holds 4,000 people.

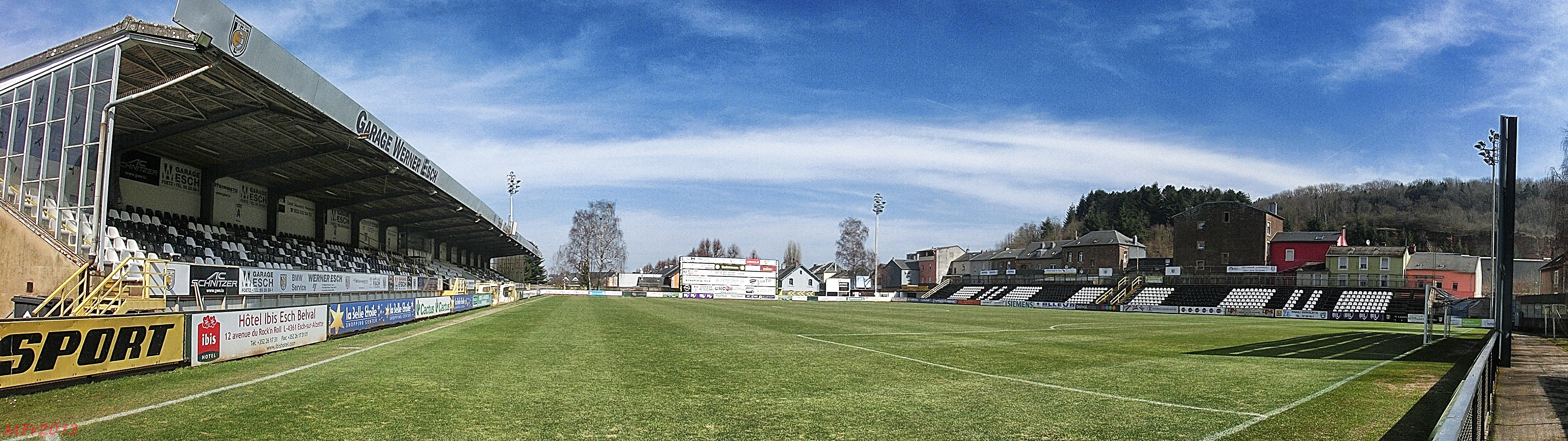
Stade de la Frontière

== History ==
Stade de la Frontière was constructed in 1920 as one of the first purpose built football stadiums in Luxembourg. In 1937, the stadium was expanded to satisfy the demands of a more professional football system. The stadium continued to be used by Jeunesse Esch during the Nazi occupation of Luxembourg, where they were forced to play in the German regional leagues.

In 1970, the Canton of Esch-sur-Alzette, as the owners, paid to renovate the stadium. This included rotating the pitch 90 degrees. This was done utilising extra land provided by the Aciéries Réunies de Burbach-Eich-Dudelange (ARBED) steel company. This expansion also brought local residences to form a part of the stadium's border walls. Jeunesse Esch installed advertising panels to try and mitigate risks of damages to the property caused by footballs.

In 2015, the stands were renovated by the Canton at a cost of €500,000, despite reports that a nearby former ARBED power plant would be used as the site for a new stadium to replace Stade de la Frontière. This came about after the concrete East Stand, that replaced the original wooden one, was forced to be closed on safety grounds. The rebuild of this stand cost €800,000 but a roof for the stand was not included as a part of the planned reconstruction. In 2021 the pitch was relaid, though it did not have undersoil heating installed. In 2022, the West Stand was also demolished and rebuilt.

Jeunesse Esch introduced a policy whereby entry to Stade de la Frontière would be free after the first half of a football match. The stadium has hosted the Luxembourg national under-21 football team.
