= UEFA Euro 1988 qualifying =

Tournament details
- Dates: 10 September 1986 – 20 December 1987
- Teams: 32

Tournament statistics
- Matches played: 117 (Note: The matches/goals tally takes into account fixtures that were subsequently annulled.)
- Goals scored: 287 (2.45 per match)
- Top scorer: (Netherlands) John Bosman (9 goals)

This page describes the qualifying procedure for UEFA Euro 1988.

== Qualified teams ==
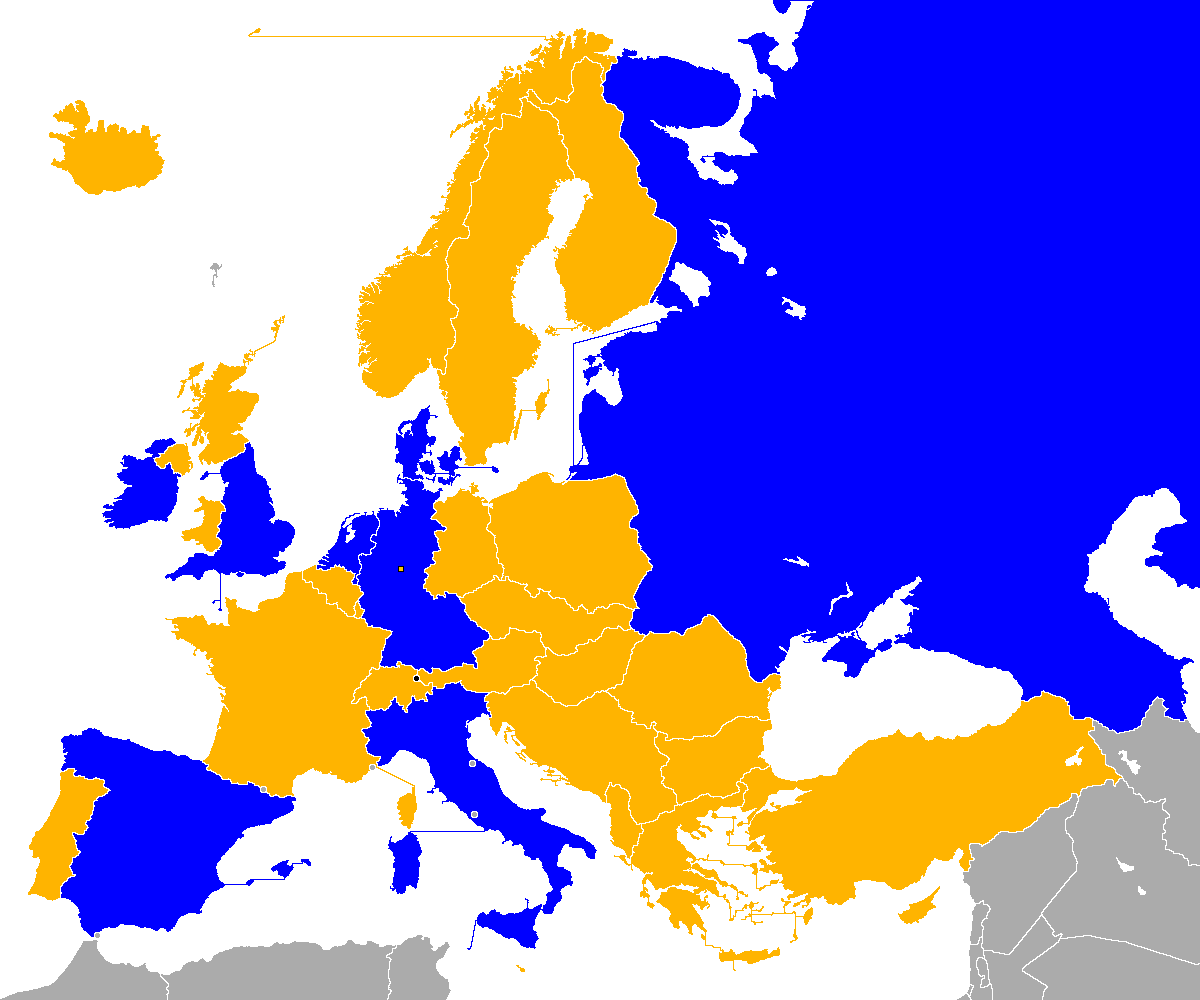
Qualified Did not qualify Did not enter Not a UEFA member

Team	Qualified as	Qualified on	Previous appearances in tournament (Note: Bold indicates champion for that year. Italic indicates host for that year.)
West Germany	Host	14 March 1985	4 (**1972**, 1976, **1980**, 1984)
Denmark	Group 6 winner	14 October 1987	2 (1964, 1984)
Soviet Union	Group 3 winner	28 October 1987	4 (**1960**, 1964, 1968, 1972)
England	Group 4 winner	11 November 1987	2 (1968, 1980)
Republic of Ireland	Group 7 winner	11 November 1987	0 (debut)
Italy	Group 2 winner	14 November 1987	2 (**1968**, 1980)
Spain	Group 1 winner	18 November 1987	3 (**1964**, 1980, 1984)
Netherlands	Group 5 winner	9 December 1987	2 (1976, 1980)

== Seedings ==
Pool 1	Pool 2	Pool 3	Pool 4	Pool 5
France (title holders); **England**; **Denmark**; **Spain**; **Netherlands**; Portugal; Belgium	**Soviet Union**; Romania; Northern Ireland; Sweden; Hungary; Wales; Bulgaria	Austria; Yugoslavia; Czechoslovakia; East Germany; Poland; Switzerland; **Republic of Ireland**	Scotland; Greece; Norway; Finland; **Italy**; Turkey; Albania	Iceland; Malta; Cyprus; Luxembourg

== Summary ==
Group winners qualified directly for UEFA Euro 1988
Other teams were eliminated

Group 1	Group 2	Group 3	Group 4	Group 5	Group 6	Group 7
Spain	Italy	Soviet Union	England	Netherlands	Denmark	Republic of Ireland
Romania Austria Albania	Sweden Portugal Switzerland Malta	East Germany France Iceland Norway	Yugoslavia Northern Ireland Turkey	Greece Hungary Poland Cyprus	Czechoslovakia Wales Finland	Bulgaria Belgium Scotland Luxembourg

== Tiebreakers ==
If two or more teams finished level on points after completion of the group matches, the following tie-breakers were used to determine the final ranking:

1. Greater number of points in all group matches
2. Goal difference in all group matches
3. Greater number of goals scored in all group matches
4. Drawing of lots

== Groups ==
The qualifying draw took place on 14 February 1986, in Frankfurt. West Germany qualified automatically as hosts of the competition. 32 teams entered the draw.

The qualifiers, consisting of 32 teams divided into seven groups; three of four teams and four of five teams, were played in 1986 and 1987. Each group winner progressed to the finals.

=== Group 1 ===
Pos	Team	Pld	W	D	L	GF	GA	GD	Pts	Qualification	(Spain)	(Romania)	(Austria)	(Albania)
1	Spain	6	5	0	1	14	6	+8	**10**	Qualify for final tournament	—	1–0	2–0	5–0
2	Romania	6	4	1	1	13	3	+10	**9**		3–1	—	4–0	5–1
3	Austria	6	2	1	3	6	9	−3	**5**		2–3	0–0	—	3–0
4	Albania	6	0	0	6	2	17	−15	**0**		1–2	0–1	0–1	—

Source: UEFA

=== Group 2 ===
Pos	Team	Pld	W	D	L	GF	GA	GD	Pts	Qualification	(Italy)	(Sweden)	(Portugal)	(Switzerland)	(Malta)
1	Italy	8	6	1	1	16	4	+12	**13**	Qualify for final tournament	—	2–1	3–0	3–2	5–0
2	Sweden	8	4	2	2	12	5	+7	**10**		1–0	—	0–1	2–0	1–0
3	Portugal	8	2	4	2	6	8	−2	**8**		0–1	1–1	—	0–0	2–2
4	Switzerland	8	1	5	2	9	9	0	**7**		0–0	1–1	1–1	—	4–1
5	Malta	8	0	2	6	4	21	−17	**2**		0–2	0–5	0–1	1–1	—

Source: UEFA

=== Group 3 ===
Pos	Team	Pld	W	D	L	GF	GA	GD	Pts	Qualification	(Soviet Union)	(East Germany)	(France)	(Iceland)	(Norway)
1	Soviet Union	8	5	3	0	14	3	+11	**13**	Qualify for final tournament	—	2–0	1–1	2–0	4–0
2	East Germany	8	4	3	1	13	4	+9	**11**		1–1	—	0–0	2–0	3–1
3	France	8	1	4	3	4	7	−3	**6**		0–2	0–1	—	2–0	1–1
4	Iceland	8	2	2	4	4	14	−10	**6**		1–1	0–6	0–0	—	2–1
5	Norway	8	1	2	5	5	12	−7	**4**		0–1	0–0	2–0	0–1	—

Source: UEFA

=== Group 4 ===
Pos	Team	Pld	W	D	L	GF	GA	GD	Pts	Qualification	(England)	(Socialist Federal Republic of Yugoslavia)	(Northern Ireland)	(Turkey)
1	England	6	5	1	0	19	1	+18	**11**	Qualify for final tournament	—	2–0	3–0	8–0
2	Yugoslavia	6	4	0	2	13	9	+4	**8**		1–4	—	3–0	4–0
3	Northern Ireland	6	1	1	4	2	10	−8	**3**		0–2	1–2	—	1–0
4	Turkey	6	0	2	4	2	16	−14	**2**		0–0	2–3	0–0	—

Source: UEFA

=== Group 5 ===
Pos	Team	Pld	W	D	L	GF	GA	GD	Pts	Qualification	(Netherlands)	(Greece)	(Hungary)	(Poland)	(Cyprus)
1	Netherlands	8	6	2	0	15	1	+14	**14**	Qualify for final tournament	—	1–1	2–0	0–0	4–0 (Note: The Netherlands v Cyprus match originally finished as an 8–0 win for the Netherlands, but the match was marred by crowd violence. Therefore the result was annulled and the match was ordered to be replayed behind closed doors.)
2	Greece	8	4	1	3	12	13	−1	**9**		0–3	—	2–1	1–0	3–1
3	Hungary	8	4	0	4	13	11	+2	**8**		0–1	3–0	—	5–3	1–0
4	Poland	8	3	2	3	9	11	−2	**8**		0–2	2–1	3–2	—	0–0
5	Cyprus	8	0	1	7	3	16	−13	**1**		0–2	2–4	0–1	0–1	—

Source: UEFA

=== Group 6 ===
Pos	Team	Pld	W	D	L	GF	GA	GD	Pts	Qualification	(Denmark)	(Czechoslovakia)	(Wales)	(Finland)
1	Denmark	6	3	2	1	4	2	+2	**8**	Qualify for final tournament	—	1–1	1–0	1–0
2	Czechoslovakia	6	2	3	1	7	5	+2	**7**		0–0	—	2–0	3–0
3	Wales	6	2	2	2	7	5	+2	**6**		1–0	1–1	—	4–0
4	Finland	6	1	1	4	4	10	−6	**3**		0–1	3–0	1–1	—

Source: UEFA

=== Group 7 ===
Pos	Team	Pld	W	D	L	GF	GA	GD	Pts	Qualification	(Republic of Ireland)	(Bulgaria)	(Belgium)	(Scotland)	(Luxembourg)
1	Republic of Ireland	8	4	3	1	10	5	+5	**11**	Qualify for final tournament	—	2–0	0–0	0–0	2–1
2	Bulgaria	8	4	2	2	12	6	+6	**10**		2–1	—	2–0	0–1	3–0
3	Belgium	8	3	3	2	16	8	+8	**9**		2–2	1–1	—	4–1	3–0
4	Scotland	8	3	3	2	7	5	+2	**9**		0–1	0–0	2–0	—	3–0
5	Luxembourg	8	0	1	7	2	23	−21	**1**		0–2	1–4	0–6	0–0	—

Source: UEFA

== Goalscorers ==
There were 287 goals scored in 117 matches, for an average of 2.45 goals per match.

9 goals

- (Netherlands) John Bosman

7 goals

- (Belgium) Nico Claesen

6 goals

- (Italy) Alessandro Altobelli
- (Sweden) Johnny Ekström

5 goals

- (Bulgaria) Lachezar Tanev
- (East Germany) Andreas Thom
- (England) Gary Lineker
- (Greece) Nikos Anastopoulos
- (Netherlands) Ruud Gullit

4 goals

- (East Germany) Ulf Kirsten
- (Italy) Gianluca Vialli
- (Soviet Union) Igor Belanov
- (Switzerland) Georges Bregy
- (Socialist Federal Republic of Yugoslavia) Zlatko Vujović

3 goals

- (Austria) Toni Polster
- (Bulgaria) Nasko Sirakov
- (Czechoslovakia) Ivo Knoflíček
- (England) John Barnes
- (Hungary) Lajos Détári
- (Malta) Carmel Busuttil
- (Poland) Dariusz Dziekanowski
- (Republic of Ireland) Frank Stapleton
- (Spain) José Mari Bakero
- (Spain) Míchel

2 goals

- (Austria) Manfred Linzmaier
- (Belgium) Jan Ceulemans
- (Belgium) Franky Vercauteren
- (Bulgaria) Hristo Kolev
- (Denmark) Jan Mølby
- (England) Peter Beardsley
- (England) Bryan Robson
- (England) Chris Waddle
- (Finland) Ari Hjelm
- (Greece) Dimitris Saravakos
- (Hungary) Imre Boda
- (Hungary) György Bognár
- (Hungary) Ferenc Mészáros
- (Netherlands) Hans Gillhaus
- (Netherlands) Ronald Koeman
- (Netherlands) Marco van Basten
- (Norway) Jørn Andersen
- (Poland) Marek Leśniak
- (Portugal) Jorge Plácido
- (Republic of Ireland) Paul McGrath
- (Romania) Gheorghe Hagi
- (Romania) Ștefan Iovan
- (Romania) Victor Pițurcă
- (Scotland) Davie Cooper
- (Scotland) Paul McStay
- (Soviet Union) Oleksandr Zavarov
- (Spain) Eloy Olaya
- (Sweden) Peter Larsson
- (Wales) Ian Rush
- (Socialist Federal Republic of Yugoslavia) Faruk Hadžibegić
- (Socialist Federal Republic of Yugoslavia) Srečko Katanec
- (Socialist Federal Republic of Yugoslavia) Fadil Vokrri

1 goal

- (Albania) Sokol Kushta
- (Albania) Shkëlqim Muça
- (Austria) Andreas Ogris
- (Belgium) Peter Crève
- (Belgium) Marc Degryse
- (Belgium) Eric Gerets
- (Belgium) Pier Janssen
- (Belgium) Enzo Scifo
- (Bulgaria) Ayan Sadakov
- (Bulgaria) Georgi Yordanov
- (Cyprus) Evagoras Christofi
- (Cyprus) Pavlos Savva
- (Cyprus) Giorgos Savvidis
- (Czechoslovakia) Michal Bílek
- (Czechoslovakia) Ivan Hašek
- (Czechoslovakia) Petr Janečka
- (Czechoslovakia) Karel Kula
- (Denmark) Jens Jørn Bertelsen
- (Denmark) Preben Elkjær
- (East Germany) Thomas Doll
- (East Germany) Matthias Döschner
- (East Germany) Rainer Ernst
- (East Germany) Ralf Minge
- (England) Tony Adams
- (England) Viv Anderson
- (England) Steve Hodge
- (England) Gary Mabbutt
- (England) Neil Webb
- (Finland) Ismo Lius
- (Finland) Petri Tiainen
- (France) Philippe Fargeon
- (France) Carmelo Micciche
- (France) Yannick Stopyra
- (France) José Touré
- (Greece) Kostas Antoniou
- (Greece) Kostas Batsinilas
- (Greece) Andreas Bonovas
- (Greece) Tasos Mitropoulos
- (Greece) Lakis Papaioannou
- (Hungary) József Kiprich
- (Hungary) Zoltán Péter
- (Hungary) Tamás Preszeller
- (Hungary) István Vincze
- (Iceland) Atli Eðvaldsson
- (Iceland) Arnór Guðjohnsen
- (Iceland) Pétur Ormslev
- (Iceland) Pétur Pétursson
- (Italy) Salvatore Bagni
- (Italy) Giuseppe Bergomi
- (Italy) Luigi De Agostini
- (Italy) Roberto Donadoni
- (Italy) Riccardo Ferri
- (Italy) Giuseppe Giannini
- (Luxembourg) Armin Krings
- (Luxembourg) Robby Langers
- (Malta) Dennis Mizzi
- (Netherlands) Arnold Mühren
- (Netherlands) Ronald Spelbos
- (Netherlands) John van 't Schip
- (Northern Ireland) Colin Clarke
- (Northern Ireland) Jimmy Quinn
- (Norway) Jan Kristian Fjærestad
- (Norway) Per Edmund Mordt
- (Norway) Tom Sundby
- (Poland) Dariusz Marciniak
- (Poland) Włodzimierz Smolarek
- (Poland) Ryszard Tarasiewicz
- (Poland) Roman Wójcicki
- (Portugal) José Coelho
- (Portugal) Manuel Fernandes
- (Portugal) Fernando Gomes
- (Portugal) Frederico Rosa
- (Republic of Ireland) Liam Brady
- (Republic of Ireland) Tony Galvin
- (Republic of Ireland) Mark Lawrenson
- (Republic of Ireland) Kevin Moran
- (Republic of Ireland) Ronnie Whelan
- (Romania) Miodrag Belodedici
- (Romania) László Bölöni
- (Romania) Adrian Bumbescu
- (Romania) Michael Klein
- (Romania) Marius Lăcătuș
- (Romania) Dorin Mateuț
- (Romania) Nicolae Ungureanu
- (Scotland) Mo Johnston
- (Scotland) Gary Mackay
- (Scotland) Ally McCoist
- (Soviet Union) Sergei Aleinikov
- (Soviet Union) Oleg Blokhin
- (Soviet Union) Vagiz Khidiyatullin
- (Soviet Union) Hennadiy Lytovchenko
- (Soviet Union) Oleksiy Mykhaylychenko
- (Soviet Union) Oleh Protasov
- (Soviet Union) Vasyl Rats
- (Soviet Union) Tengiz Sulakvelidze
- (Spain) Juan Carlos Arteche
- (Spain) Ramón Calderé
- (Spain) Lobo Carrasco
- (Spain) Joaquín
- (Spain) Francisco Llorente
- (Spain) Manuel Sanchís
- (Sweden) Stig Fredriksson
- (Sweden) Glenn Hysén
- (Sweden) Mats Magnusson
- (Sweden) Glenn Strömberg
- (Switzerland) Jean-Paul Brigger
- (Switzerland) André Egli
- (Switzerland) Andy Halter
- (Switzerland) Martin Weber
- (Switzerland) Hans-Peter Zwicker
- (Turkey) Yusuf Altıntaş
- (Turkey) Feyyaz Uçar
- (Wales) Glyn Hodges
- (Wales) Mark Hughes
- (Wales) Andy Jones
- (Wales) David Phillips
- (Wales) Neil Slatter
- (Socialist Federal Republic of Yugoslavia) Ljubomir Radanović
- (Socialist Federal Republic of Yugoslavia) Dejan Savićević
- (Socialist Federal Republic of Yugoslavia) Dragan Stojković
