= France national football team results (1980–1999) =

List of the France national football team results from 1980 to 1999

- Win Draw Loss

This is a list of the France national football team results from 1980 to 1999.

== 1980s ==
=== 1980 ===
| 27 February International friendly | France | 5–1 | Greece | Paris, France |
| | Bathenay 7' (pen.); Platini 37', 62'; Christophe 63'; Stopyra 66' | Match Report | Mavros 32' | Stadium: Parc des Princes; Attendance: 29,992; Referee: José Luis Garcia Carrión (Spain) |

| 26 March International friendly | France | 0–0 | Netherlands | Paris, France |
| | | Match Report | | Stadium: Parc des Princes; Attendance: 41,477; Referee: Paolo Casarin (Italian) |

| 23 May International friendly | Soviet Union | 1–0 | France | Moscow, Soviet Union |
| | Cherenkov 85' | Match Report | | Stadium: Lenin Stadium; Attendance: 55,000; Referee: Sándor Kúti (Hungary) |

| 11 October 1982 FIFA World Cup; Qualifying Group 2 | Cyprus | 0–7 | France | Limassol, Cyprus |
| | | Match Report | Lacombe 4'; Platini 14', 23'; Larios 40' (pen.), 76' (pen.); Six 82'; Zimako 87' | Stadium: Tsirion Stadium; Attendance: 15,000; Referee: Bruno Galler (Switzerland) |

| 28 October 1982 FIFA World Cup; Qualifying Group 2 | France | 2–0 | Republic of Ireland | Paris, France |
| | Platini 11'; Zimako 77' | Match Report | | Stadium: Parc des Princes; Attendance: 44,800; Referee: Augusto Lamo Castillo (Spain) |

| 19 November International friendly | West Germany | 4–1 | France | Hanover, West Germany |
| | Kaltz 6' (pen.); Briegel 37'; Hrubesch 62'; Allofs 89' | Match Report | Larios 39' (pen.) | Stadium: Niedersachsenstadion; Attendance: 63,000; Referee: Rolf Nyhus (Norway) |

=== 1981 ===
| 18 February International friendly | Spain | 1–0 | France | Madrid, Spain |
| | Juanito 86' (pen.) | Match Report | | Stadium: Vicente Calderón Stadium; Attendance: 18,000; Referee: Carol Juria (Romania) |

| 25 March 1982 FIFA World Cup; Qualifying Group 2 | Netherlands | 1–0 | France | Rotterdam, Netherlands |
| | Dropsy 47' (o.g.) | Match Report | | Stadium: De Kuip; Attendance: 58,000; Referee: Luigi Agnolin (Italy) |

| 29 April 1982 FIFA World Cup; Qualifying Group 2 | France | 3–2 | Belgium | Paris, France |
| | Soler 14', 31'; Six 26' | Match Report | Vandenbergh 5'; Ceulemans 52' | Stadium: Parc des Princes; Attendance: 44,954; Referee: Victoriano Sánchez Arminio (Spain) |

| 15 May International friendly | France | 1–3 | Brazil | Paris, France |
| | Six 81' | Match Report | Zico 21'; Reinaldo 27'; Sócrates 52' | Stadium: Parc des Princes; Attendance: 47,749; Referee: Gianfranco Menegali (Italy) |

| 9 September 1982 FIFA World Cup; Qualifying Group 2 | Belgium | 2–0 | France | Brussels, Belgium |
| | Czerniatynski 24'; Vandenbergh 83' | Match Report | | Stadium: Heysel Stadium; Attendance: 52,525; Referee: Károly Palotai (Hungary) |

| 14 October 1982 FIFA World Cup; Qualifying Group 2 | Republic of Ireland | 3–2 | France | Dublin, Republic of Ireland |
| | Mahut 3' (o.g.); Stapleton 23'; Robinson 40' | Match Report | Bellone 9'; Platini 83' | Stadium: Lansdowne Road; Attendance: 55,000; Referee: Ulf Eriksson (Sweden) |

| 18 November 1982 FIFA World Cup; Qualifying Group 2 | France | 2–0 | Netherlands | Paris, France |
| | Platini 52'; Six 82' | Match Report | | Stadium: Parc des Princes; Attendance: 44,884; Referee: António Garrido (Portugal) |

| 5 December 1982 FIFA World Cup; Qualifying Group 2 | France | 4–0 | Cyprus | Paris, France |
| | Rocheteau 25'; Lacombe 29', 82'; Genghini 86' | Match Report | | Stadium: Parc des Princes; Attendance: 43,437; Referee: Edwin Borg (Malta) |

=== 1982 ===
| 23 February International friendly | France | 2–0 | Italy | Paris, France |
| | Platini 19'; Bravo 84' | Match Report | | Stadium: Parc des Princes; Attendance: 43,541; Referee: Walter Eschweiler (West Germany) |

| 24 March International friendly | France | 4–0 | Northern Ireland | Paris, France |
| | Zénier 31'; Couriol 45'; Larios 57' (pen.); Genghini 80' | Match Report | | Stadium: Parc des Princes; Attendance: 35,000; Referee: Roger Verhaeghe (Belgium) |

| 28 April International friendly | France | 0–1 | Peru | Paris, France |
| | | Match Report | Oblitas 82' | Stadium: Parc des Princes; Attendance: 46,429; Referee: André Daina (Switzerland) |

| 14 May International friendly | France | 0–0 | Bulgaria | Paris, France |
| | | Match Report | | Stadium: Parc des Princes; Attendance: 45,000; Referee: Egbert Mulder (Netherlands) |

| 2 June International friendly | France | 0–1 | Wales | Toulouse, France |
| | | Match Report | Rush 55' | Stadium: Stadium Municipal; Attendance: 26,671; Referee: Viria Oliva (Portugal) |

| 16 June 1982 FIFA World Cup; First round | England | 3–1 | France | Bilbao, Spain |
| | Robson 1', 67'; Mariner 83' | Match Report | Soler 24' | Stadium: San Mamés Stadium; Attendance: 44,172; Referee: António Garrido (Portugal) |

| 21 June 1982 FIFA World Cup; First round | France | 4–1 | Kuwait | Valladolid, Spain |
| | Genghini 31'; Platini 43'; Six 48'; Bossis 89' | Match Report | Al-Buloushi 75' | Stadium: Estadio Nuevo José Zorrilla; Attendance: 30,043; Referee: Myroslav Stupar (Soviet Union) |

| 24 June 1982 FIFA World Cup; First round | Czechoslovakia | 1–1 | France | Valladolid, Spain |
| | Panenka 84' (pen.) | Match Report | Six 66' | Stadium: Estadio Nuevo José Zorrilla; Attendance: 28,000; Referee: Paolo Casarin (Italy) |

| 28 June 1982 FIFA World Cup; Second round | Austria | 0–1 | France | Madrid, Spain |
| | | Match Report | Genghini 39' | Stadium: Vicente Calderón Stadium; Attendance: 37,000; Referee: Károly Palotai (Hungary) |

| 4 July 1982 FIFA World Cup; Second round | France | 4–1 | Northern Ireland | Madrid, Spain |
| | Giresse 33', 80'; Rocheteau 46', 68' | Match Report | Armstrong 75' | Stadium: Vicente Calderón Stadium; Attendance: 37,000; Referee: Alojzy Jarguz (Poland) |

| 8 July 1982 FIFA World Cup; Semi-finals | France | 3–3 (4–5 p) | West Germany | Seville, Spain |
| | Platini 27' (pen.); Trésor 93'; Giresse 99' | Match Report | Littbarski 18'; Rummenigge 103'; Fischer 108' | Stadium: Ramón Sánchez Pizjuán Stadium; Attendance: 70,000; Referee: Charles Corver (Netherlands) |
| | Penalties |
| | Giresse (penalty scored); Amoros (penalty scored); Rocheteau (penalty scored); Six (penalty missed); Platini (penalty scored); Bossis (penalty missed) | | (penalty scored) Kaltz; (penalty scored) Breitner; (penalty missed) Stielike; (penalty scored) Littbarski; (penalty scored) Rummenigge; (penalty scored) Hrubesch |

| 10 July 1982 FIFA World Cup; Third place play-off | France | 2–3 | Poland | Alicante, Spain |
| | Girard 14'; Couriol 75' | Match Report | Szarmach 42'; Majewski 45'; Kupcewicz 47' | Stadium: Estadio José Rico Pérez; Attendance: 28,000; Referee: António Garrido (Portugal) |

| 31 August International friendly | France | 0–4 | Poland | Paris, France |
| | | Match Report | Jałocha 28'; Kupcewicz 61', 62'; Buncol 68' (pen.) | Stadium: Parc des Princes; Attendance: 16,000; Referee: Bruno Galler (Switzerland) |

| 6 October International friendly | France | 1–0 | Hungary | Paris, France |
| | Roussey 65' | Match Report | | Stadium: Parc des Princes; Attendance: 15,777; Referee: Roger Verhaeghe (Belgium) |

| 10 November International friendly | Netherlands | 1–2 | France | Rotterdam, Netherlands |
| | Tahamata 8' | Match Report | Battiston 12'; Platini 81' | Stadium: De Kuip; Attendance: 9,693; Referee: Roger Schoeters (Belgium) |

=== 1983 ===
| 16 February International friendly | Portugal | 0–3 | France | Guimarães, Portugal |
| | | Match Report | Stopyra 7', 70'; Ferreri 8' | Stadium: Estádio Municipal; Attendance: 9,000; Referee: Ulrich Nyffenegger (Switzerland) |

| 23 March International friendly | France | 1–1 | Soviet Union | Paris, France |
| | Fernández 42' | Match Report | Cherenkov 28' | Stadium: Parc des Princes; Attendance: 40,908; Referee: George Courtney (England) |

| 23 April International friendly | France | 4–0 | Yugoslavia | Paris, France |
| | Le Roux 22'; Rocheteau 32', 47'; Touré 74' | Match Report | | Stadium: Parc des Princes; Attendance: 40,881; Referee: Aron Schmidhuber (West Germany) |

| 31 May International friendly | Belgium | 1–1 | France | Luxembourg, Luxembourg |
| | Voordeckers 12' | Match Report | Six 11' | Stadium: Stade Municipale; Attendance: 5,880; Referee: Norbert Rolles (Luxembourg) |

| 7 September International friendly | Denmark | 3–1 | France | Copenhagen, Denmark |
| | Laudrup 20', 75'; Brylle 59' | Match Report | Platini 26' | Stadium: Idrætsparken; Attendance: 17,500; Referee: Volker Roth (East Germany) |

| 5 October International friendly | France | 1–1 | Spain | Paris, France |
| | Rocheteau 60' | Match Report | Señor 83' (pen.) | Stadium: Parc des Princes; Attendance: 36,628; Referee: Rosario Lo Bello (Italy) |

| 12 November International friendly | Yugoslavia | 0–0 | France | Zagreb, Yugoslavia |
| | | Match Report | | Stadium: Stadion Maksimir; Attendance: 15,000; Referee: Paolo Casarin (Italy) |

=== 1984 ===
| 29 February International friendly | France | 2–0 | England | Paris, France |
| | Platini 58', 71' | Match Report | | Stadium: Parc des Princes; Attendance: 43,000; Referee: Marcel Van Langenhove (Netherlands) |

| 28 March International friendly | France | 1–0 | Austria | Marseille, France |
| | Rocheteau 83' | Match Report | | Stadium: Stade Vélodrome; Attendance: 20,000; Referee: Viria Oliva (Portugal) |

| 18 April International friendly | France | 1–0 | West Germany | Strasbourg, France |
| | Genghini 79' | Match Report | | Stadium: Stade de la Meinau; Attendance: 39,978; Referee: Enzo Barbaresco (Italy) |

| 1 June International friendly | France | 2–0 | Scotland | Marseille, France |
| | Giresse 14'; Lacombe 29' | Match Report | | Stadium: Stade Vélodrome; Attendance: 24,641; Referee: Luigi Agnolin (Italy) |

| 12 June UEFA Euro 1984; First round | France | 1–0 | Denmark | Paris, France |
| | Platini 78'; Amoros (red card) 87' | Match Report | | Stadium: Parc des Princes; Attendance: 47,570; Referee: Volker Roth (East Germany) |

| 16 June UEFA Euro 1984; First round | France | 5–0 | Belgium | Nantes, France |
| | Platini 4', 74' (pen.), 89'; Giresse 31'; Fernández 44' | Match Report | | Stadium: Stade de la Beaujoire; Attendance: 51,359; Referee: Robert Valentine (Scotland) |

| 19 June UEFA Euro 1984; First round | France | 3–2 | Yugoslavia | Saint-Étienne, France |
| | Platini 59', 61', 76' | Match Report | Šestić 31'; Stojković 80' (pen.) | Stadium: Stade Geoffroy-Guichard; Attendance: 45,789; Referee: André Daina (Switzerland) |

| 23 June UEFA Euro 1984; Semi-finals | France | 3–2 a.e.t. | Portugal | Marseille, France |
| | Domergue 25', 115'; Platini 119' | Match Report | Jordão 74', 98' | Stadium: Stade Vélodrome; Attendance: 54,848; Referee: Paolo Bergamo (Italy) |

| 27 June UEFA Euro 1984; Final | France | 2–0 | Spain | Paris, France |
| | Platini 57'; Bellone 90'; Le Roux (yellow card) 85' (red card) | Match Report | | Stadium: Parc des Princes; Attendance: 47,368; Referee: Vojtech Christov (Bulgaria) |

| 13 October 1986 FIFA World Cup; Qualifying Group 4 | Luxembourg | 0–4 | France | Luxembourg, Luxembourg |
| | | Match Report | Battiston 2'; Platini 12'; Stopyra 24', 32' | Stadium: Stade Municipale; Attendance: 10,000; Referee: Henning Lund-Sørensen (Denmark) |

| 21 November 1986 FIFA World Cup; Qualifying Group 4 | France | 1–0 | Bulgaria | Paris, France |
| | Platini 62' (pen.) | Match Report | | Stadium: Parc des Princes; Attendance: 42,084; Referee: Karl-Heinz Tritschler (West Germany) |

| 8 December 1986 FIFA World Cup; Qualifying Group 4 | France | 2–0 | East Germany | Paris, France |
| | Stopyra 32'; Anziani 89' | Match Report | | Stadium: Parc des Princes; Attendance: 43,174; Referee: Paolo Casarin (Italy) |

=== 1985 ===
| 3 April 1986 FIFA World Cup; Qualifying Group 4 | Yugoslavia | 0–0 | France | Sarajevo, Yugoslavia |
| | | Match Report | | Stadium: Olympic Stadium; Attendance: 50,000; Referee: Erik Fredriksson (Sweden) |

| 2 May 1986 FIFA World Cup; Qualifying Group 4 | Bulgaria | 2–0 | France | Sofia, Bulgaria |
| | Dimitrov 11'; Sirakov 61' | Match Report | | Stadium: Vasil Levski National Stadium; Attendance: 70,000; Referee: Brian McGinlay (Scotland) |

| 21 August International friendly | France | 2–0 | Uruguay | Paris, France |
| | Rocheteau 5'; Touré 56' | Match Report | | Stadium: Parc des Princes; Attendance: 20,405; Referee: Abel Gnecco (Argentina) |

| 11 September 1986 FIFA World Cup; Qualifying Group 4 | East Germany | 2–0 | France | Leipzig, East Germany |
| | Ernst 53'; Kreer 81' | Match Report | | Stadium: Zentralstadion; Attendance: 78,000; Referee: Pietro D'Elia (Italy) |

| 30 October 1986 FIFA World Cup; Qualifying Group 4 | France | 6–0 | Luxembourg | Paris, France |
| | Rocheteau 4', 29', 48'; Touré 24'; Giresse 36'; Fernández 47' (pen.) | Match Report | | Stadium: Parc des Princes; Attendance: 28,597; Referee: Michał Listkiewicz (Poland) |

| 16 November 1986 FIFA World Cup; Qualifying Group 4 | France | 2–0 | Yugoslavia | Paris, France |
| | Platini 3', 71'; Le Roux (yellow card) 84' (red card) | Match Report | Radanović (yellow card) 82' (red card) | Stadium: Parc des Princes; Attendance: 45,670; Referee: Alexis Ponnet (Belgium) |

=== 1986 ===
| 26 February International friendly | France | 0–0 | Northern Ireland | Paris, France |
| | | Match Report | | Stadium: Parc des Princes; Attendance: 28,909; Referee: Alphonse Constantin (Belgium) |

| 26 March International friendly | France | 2–0 | Argentina | Paris, France |
| | Ferreri 15'; Vercruysse 80' | Match Report | Borghi (yellow card) 59' (red card) | Stadium: Parc des Princes; Attendance: 40,045; Referee: Franz Gächter (Switzerland) |

| 1 June 1986 FIFA World Cup; Group C | Canada | 0–1 | France | León, Mexico |
| | | Match Report | Papin 79' | Stadium: Estadio León; Attendance: 35,748; Referee: Hernán Silva (Chile) |

| 5 June 1986 FIFA World Cup; Group C | France | 1–1 | Soviet Union | León, Mexico |
| | Fernández 62' | Match Report | Rats 54' | Stadium: Estadio León; Attendance: 36,540; Referee: Romualdo Arppi Filho (Brazil) |

| 9 June 1986 FIFA World Cup; Group C | France | 3–0 | Hungary | León, Mexico |
| | Stopyra 30'; Tigana 63'; Rocheteau 84' | Match Report | | Stadium: Estadio León; Attendance: 31,420; Referee: Carlos Silva Valente (Portugal) |

| 17 June 1986 FIFA World Cup; Second round | France | 2–0 | Italy | Mexico City, Mexico |
| | Platini 15'; Stopyra 57' | Match Report | | Stadium: Estadio Olímpico Universitario; Attendance: 71,449; Referee: Carlos Espósito (Argentina) |

| 21 June 1986 FIFA World Cup; Quarter-finals | Brazil | 1–1 (3–4 p) | France | Guadalajara, Mexico |
| | Careca 17' | Match Report | Platini 41' | Stadium: Estadio Jalisco; Attendance: 65,677; Referee: Ioan Igna (Romania) |
| | Penalties |
| | Sócrates (penalty missed); Alemão (penalty scored); Zico (penalty scored); Branco (penalty scored); Júlio César (penalty missed) | | (penalty scored) Stopyra; (penalty scored) Amoros; (penalty scored) Bellone; (penalty missed) Platini; (penalty scored) Fernández |

| 25 June 1986 FIFA World Cup; Semi-finals | France | 0–2 | West Germany | Guadalajara, Mexico |
| | | Match Report | Brehme 9'; Völler 90' | Stadium: Estadio Jalisco; Attendance: 47,500; Referee: Luigi Agnolin (Italy) |

| 28 June 1986 FIFA World Cup; Third place match | Belgium | 2–4 a.e.t. | France | Puebla, Mexico |
| | Ceulemans 11'; Claesen 73' | Match Report | Ferreri 27'; Papin 43'; Genghini 104'; Amoros 111' (pen.) | Stadium: Estadio Cuauhtémoc; Attendance: 21,500; Referee: George Courtney (England) |

| 19 August International friendly | Switzerland | 2–0 | France | Lausanne, Switzerland |
| | Hermann 72'; Sutter 75' | Match Report | | Stadium: Stade Olympique de la Pontaise; Attendance: 22,000; Referee: Karl-Heinz Tritschler (West Germany) |

| 10 September UEFA Euro 1988; Qualifying Group 3 | Iceland | 0–0 | France | Reykjavík, Iceland |
| | | Match Report | | Stadium: Laugardalsvöllur; Attendance: 13,758; Referee: Alan Ferguson (Scotland) |

| 11 October UEFA Euro 1988; Qualifying Group 3 | France | 0–2 | Soviet Union | Paris, France |
| | | Match Report | Belanov 67'; Rats 73' | Stadium: Parc des Princes; Attendance: 40,496; Referee: Paolo Casarin (Italy) |

| 19 November UEFA Euro 1988; Qualifying Group 3 | East Germany | 0–0 | France | Leipzig, East Germany |
| | | Match Report | | Stadium: Zentralstadion; Attendance: 54,578; Referee: George Courtney (England) |

=== 1987 ===
| 29 April UEFA Euro 1988; Qualifying Group 3 | France | 2–0 | Iceland | Paris, France |
| | Micciche 37'; Stopyra 65' | Match Report | | Stadium: Parc des Princes; Attendance: 27,732; Referee: Frederick McKnight (Northern Ireland) |

| 16 June UEFA Euro 1988; Qualifying Group 3 | Norway | 2–0 | France | Oslo, Norway |
| | Mordt 71'; Andersen 80' | Match Report | | Stadium: Ullevaal Stadion; Attendance: 7,678; Referee: Werner Föckler (West Germany) |

| 12 August International friendly | West Germany | 2–1 | France | West Berlin |
| | Völler 4', 9' | Match Report | Cantona 42' | Stadium: Olympiastadion; Attendance: 31,000; Referee: Henning Lund-Sørensen (Denmark) |

| 9 September UEFA Euro 1988; Qualifying Group 3 | Soviet Union | 1–1 | France | Moscow, Soviet Union |
| | Mikhailichenko 77' | Match Report | Touré 13' | Stadium: Central Lenin Stadium; Attendance: 86,048; Referee: Gerassimos Germanakos (Greece) |

| 14 October UEFA Euro 1988; Qualifying Group 3 | France | 1–1 | Norway | Paris, France |
| | Fargeon 63' | Match Report | Sundby 79' | Stadium: Parc des Princes; Attendance: 11,308; Referee: Joaquín Ramos (Spain) |

| 18 November UEFA Euro 1988; Qualifying Group 3 | France | 0–1 | East Germany | Paris, France |
| | | Match Report | Ernst 90' | Stadium: Parc des Princes; Attendance: 16,581; Referee: Carlos Silva Valente (Portugal) |

=== 1988 ===
| 27 January International friendly | Israel | 1–1 | France | Ramat Gan, Israel |
| | Avraham Cohen 69' | Match Report | Stopyra 60' | Stadium: Ramat Gan Stadium; Attendance: 5,000; Referee: Allan Gunn (England) |

| 2 February International friendly | France | 2–1 | Switzerland | Toulouse, France |
| | Passi 7'; Fargeon 9' | Match Report | Sutter 19' | Stadium: Stadium Municipal; Attendance: 10,348; Referee: Gérard Biguet (France) |

| 5 February International friendly | France | 2–1 | Morocco | Monaco |
| | Lamriss 9' (o.g.); Stopyra 49' | Match Report | Lamriss 34' | Stadium: Stade Louis II; Attendance: 10,000; Referee: Michel Vautrot (France) |

| 23 March International friendly | France | 2–1 | Spain | Bordeaux, France |
| | Passi 8'; Fernández 26' | Match Report | Calderé 6' | Stadium: Parc Lescure; Attendance: 14,441; Referee: Neil Midgley (England) |

| 27 April International friendly | Northern Ireland | 0–0 | France | Belfast, Northern Ireland |
| | | Match Report | | Stadium: Windsor Park; Attendance: 8,000; Referee: Keith Cooper (Wales) |

| 24 August International friendly | France | 1–1 | Czechoslovakia | Paris, France |
| | Paille 52' | Match Report | Daněk 82' | Stadium: Parc des Princes; Attendance: 15,000; Referee: Ildefonso Urízar (Spain) |

| 28 September 1990 FIFA World Cup; Qualifying Group 5 | France | 1–0 | Norway | Paris, France |
| | Papin 84' (pen.) | Match Report | | Stadium: Parc des Princes; Attendance: 22,000; Referee: Günther Habermann (East Germany) |

| 22 October 1990 FIFA World Cup; Qualifying Group 5 | Cyprus | 1–1 | France | Nicosia, Cyprus |
| | Pittas 78' (pen.) | Match Report | Xuereb 44' | Stadium: Makario Stadium; Attendance: 2,700; Referee: Emilio Soriano Aladrén (Spain) |

| 19 November 1990 FIFA World Cup; Qualifying Group 5 | Yugoslavia | 3–2 | France | Belgrade, Yugoslavia |
| | Spasić 11'; Sušić 76'; Stojković 82' | Match Report | Perez 3'; Sauzée 68' | Stadium: JNA Stadium; Attendance: 7,489; Referee: Erik Fredriksson (Sweden) |

=== 1989 ===
| 7 February International friendly | Republic of Ireland | 0–0 | France | Dublin, Republic of Ireland |
| | | Match Report | | Stadium: Dalymount Park; Attendance: 22,000; Referee: John Lloyd (Wales) |

| 8 March 1990 FIFA World Cup; Qualifying Group 5 | Scotland | 2–0 | France | Glasgow, Scotland |
| | Johnston 28', 52' | Match Report | | Stadium: Hampden Park; Attendance: 65,204; Referee: Jiří Stiegler (Czechoslovakia) |

| 29 April 1990 FIFA World Cup; Qualifying Group 5 | France | 0–0 | Yugoslavia | Paris, France |
| | | Match Report | | Stadium: Parc des Princes; Attendance: 34,287; Referee: Tullio Lanese (Italy) |

| 16 August International friendly | Sweden | 2–4 | France | Malmö, Sweden |
| | Thern 5'; Lindqvist 63' | Match Report | Cantona 57', 87'; Papin 61', 83' | Stadium: Malmö Stadion; Attendance: 16,619; Referee: Zvi Sharir (Israel) |

| 5 September 1990 FIFA World Cup; Qualifying Group 5 | Norway | 1–1 | France | Oslo, Norway |
| | Bratseth 84' | Match Report | Papin 40' (pen.) | Stadium: Ullevaal Stadion; Attendance: 8,564; Referee: Todor Kolev (Bulgaria) |

| 11 October 1990 FIFA World Cup; Qualifying Group 5 | France | 3–0 | Scotland | Paris, France |
| | Deschamps 26'; Cantona 63'; Nicol 88' (o.g.); Di Meco (yellow card) 57' (red card) | Match Report | | Stadium: Parc des Princes; Attendance: 25,000; Referee: Kurt Röthlisberger (Switzerland) |

| 18 November 1990 FIFA World Cup; Qualifying Group 5 | France | 2–0 | Cyprus | Toulouse, France |
| | Deschamps 25'; Blanc 75' | Match Report | | Stadium: Stadium Municipal; Attendance: 34,687; Referee: Valeri Butenko (Soviet Union) |

== 1990s ==
=== 1990 ===
| 21 January International friendly | Kuwait | 0–1 | France | Kuwait City, Kuwait |
| | | Match Report | Blanc 74' | Stadium: Al-Sadaqua Walsalam Stadium; Attendance: 5,000; Referee: Ghazi al-Kendi (Kuwait) |

| 24 January International friendly | East Germany | 0–3 | France | Kuwait City, Kuwait |
| | | Match Report | Cantona 1', 24'; Deschamps 73' | Stadium: Al-Sadaqua Walsalam Stadium; Attendance: 1,500; Referee: Mohammad Shuaib (Kuwait) |

| 28 February International friendly | France | 2–1 | West Germany | Montpellier, France |
| | Papin 43'; Cantona 82' | Match Report | Möller 37' | Stadium: Stade de la Mosson; Attendance: 22,000; Referee: Joaquín Ramos (Spain) |

| 28 March International friendly | Hungary | 1–3 | France | Budapest, Hungary |
| | Pintér 38' (pen.) | Match Report | Cantona 27', 67'; Sauzée 70' | Stadium: Népstadion; Attendance: 12,000; Referee: Tadeusz Diakonowicz (Poland) |

| 15 August International friendly | France | 0–0 | Poland | Paris, France |
| | | Match Report | | Stadium: Parc des Princes; Attendance: 15,919; Referee: Neil Midgley (England) |

| 5 September UEFA Euro 1992; Qualifying Group 1 | Iceland | 1–2 | France | Budapest, Hungary |
| | Eðvaldsson 85' | Match Report | Papin 12'; Cantona 76' | Stadium: Népstadion; Attendance: 8,000; Referee: David Syme (Poland) |

| 13 October UEFA Euro 1992; Qualifying Group 1 | France | 2–1 | Czechoslovakia | Paris, France |
| | Papin 59', 82' | Match Report | Skuhravý 88' | Stadium: Parc des Princes; Attendance: 38,249; Referee: George Courtney (England) |

| 17 November UEFA Euro 1992; Qualifying Group 1 | Albania | 0–1 | France | Tirana, Albania |
| | | Match Report | Boli 22' | Stadium: Qemal Stafa Stadium; Attendance: 15,000; Referee: Bruno Galler (Switzerland) |

=== 1991 ===
| 20 February UEFA Euro 1992; Qualifying Group 1 | France | 3–1 | Spain | Paris, France |
| | Sauzée 14'; Papin 58'; Blanc 77' | Match Report | Bakero 10' | Stadium: Parc des Princes; Attendance: 41,174; Referee: Tullio Lanese (Italy) |

| 30 March UEFA Euro 1992; Qualifying Group 1 | France | 5–0 | Albania | Paris, France |
| | Sauzée 1', 19'; Papin 34' (pen.), 42'; Nallbani 81' (o.g.) | Match Report | | Stadium: Parc des Princes; Attendance: 24,181; Referee: Einar Halle (Norway) |

| 14 August International friendly | Poland | 1–5 | France | Poznań, Poland |
| | Urban 18' | Match Report | Sauzée 41'; Papin 45'; Simba 69'; Blanc 70'; Perez 78' | Stadium: Stadion Lecha; Attendance: 14,000; Referee: Alexey Spirin (Soviet Union) |

| 4 September UEFA Euro 1992; Qualifying Group 1 | Czechoslovakia | 1–2 | France | Bratislava, Czechoslovakia |
| | Boli 19' (o.g.) | Match Report | Papin 53', 89' | Stadium: Tehelné pole Attendance: 48,000; Referee: Peter Mikkelsen (Denmark) |

| 12 October UEFA Euro 1992; Qualifying Group 1 | Spain | 1–2 | France | Seville, Spain |
| | Abelardo 34' | Match Report | Fernández 13'; Papin 16' | Stadium: Estadio Benito Villamarín; Attendance: 20,000; Referee: Hubert Forstinger (Austria) |

| 20 November UEFA Euro 1992; Qualifying Group 1 | France | 3–1 | Iceland | Paris, France |
| | Simba 42'; Cantona 59', 68' | Match Report | Sverrisson 71' | Stadium: Parc des Princes; Attendance: 27,381; Referee: Erik Fredriksson (Sweden) |

=== 1992 ===
| 19 February International friendly | England | 2–0 | France | London, England |
| | Shearer 45'; Lineker 73' | Match Report | | Stadium: Wembley Stadium; Attendance: 58,723; Referee: Aron Schmidhuber (West Germany) |

| 25 March International friendly | France | 3–3 | Belgium | Paris, France |
| | Papin 40' (pen.), 85'; Vahirua 45' | Match Report | Albert 28'; Scifo 44' (pen.); Wilmots 47' | Stadium: Parc des Princes; Attendance: 25,000; Referee: Philip Don (England) |

| 27 May International friendly | Switzerland | 2–1 | France | Lausanne, Switzerland |
| | Bonvin 28', 72' | Match Report | Divert 20' | Stadium: Stade Olympique de la Pontaise; Attendance: 21,000; Referee: Alfred Wieser (Austria) |

| 5 June International friendly | France | 1–1 | Netherlands | Lens, France |
| | Papin 12' | Match Report | Roy 18' | Stadium: Stade Félix-Bollaert; Attendance: 40,000; Referee: Hans-Jürgen Weber (Germany) |

| 10 June UEFA Euro 1992; Group 1 | Sweden | 1–1 | France | Solna, Sweden |
| | Eriksson 25' | Match Report | Papin 59' | Stadium: Råsunda Stadium; Attendance: 29,860; Referee: Alexey Spirin (CIS) |

| 14 June UEFA Euro 1992; Group 1 | England | 0–0 | France | Malmö, Sweden |
| | | Match Report | | Stadium: Malmö Stadion; Attendance: 26,535; Referee: Sándor Puhl (Hungary) |

| 17 June UEFA Euro 1992; Group 1 | Denmark | 2–1 | France | Malmö, Sweden |
| | Larsen 8'; Elstrup 78' | Match Report | Papin 61' | Stadium: Malmö Stadion; Attendance: 25,673; Referee: Hubert Forstinger (Austria) |

| 26 August International friendly | France | 0–2 | Brazil | Paris, France |
| | | Match Report | Martini 43' (o.g.); Luís Henrique 52' | Stadium: Parc des Princes; Attendance: 34,428; Referee: Frans Van Den Wijngaert (Belgium) |

| 9 September 1994 FIFA World Cup; Qualifying Group 6 | Bulgaria | 2–0 | France | Sofia, Bulgaria |
| | Stoichkov 21' (pen.); Balakov 29' | Match Report | | Stadium: Vasil Levski National Stadium; Attendance: 41,000; Referee: Sándor Puhl (Hungary) |

| 14 October 1994 FIFA World Cup; Qualifying Group 6 | France | 2–0 | Austria | Paris, France |
| | Papin 3'; Cantona 77' | Match Report | | Stadium: Parc des Princes; Attendance: 39,186; Referee: Vadim Zhuk (Belarus) |

| 14 November 1994 FIFA World Cup; Qualifying Group 6 | France | 2–1 | Finland | Paris, France |
| | Papin 18'; Cantona 31' | Match Report | Järvinen 55' | Stadium: Parc des Princes; Attendance: 28,630; Referee: Jozef Marko (Czechoslovakia) |

=== 1993 ===
| 17 February 1994 FIFA World Cup; Qualifying Group 6 | Israel | 0–4 | France | Ramat Gan, Israel |
| | | Match Report | Cantona 27'; Blanc 62', 84'; Roche 89' | Stadium: Ramat Gan Stadium; Attendance: 26,000; Referee: Ryszard Wójcik (Poland) |

| 27 March 1994 FIFA World Cup; Qualifying Group 6 | Austria | 0–1 | France | Vienna, Austria |
| | | Match Report | Papin 58' | Stadium: Ernst-Happel-Stadion; Attendance: 37,837; Referee: John Blankenstein (Netherlands) |

| 28 April 1994 FIFA World Cup; Qualifying Group 6 | France | 2–1 | Sweden | Paris, France |
| | Cantona 43' (pen.), 82' | Match Report | Dahlin 14' | Stadium: Parc des Princes; Attendance: 34,134; Referee: Pierluigi Pairetto (Italy) |

| 28 July International friendly | France | 3–1 | Russia | Caen, France |
| | Sauzée 16'; Cantona 20'; Papin 36' | Match Report | Blanc 23' (o.g.) | Stadium: Stade Michel d'Ornano; Attendance: 18,500; Referee: Alfredo Trentalange (Italy) |

| 22 August 1994 FIFA World Cup; Qualifying Group 6 | Sweden | 1–1 | France | Solna, Sweden |
| | Dahlin 87' | Match Report | Sauzée 76' | Stadium: Råsunda Stadium; Attendance: 30,530; Referee: Aron Schmidhuber (Germany) |

| 8 September 1994 FIFA World Cup; Qualifying Group 6 | Finland | 0–2 | France | Tampere, Finland |
| | | Match Report | Blanc 47'; Papin 55' (pen.) | Stadium: Ratina Stadium; Attendance: 8,000; Referee: Stephen Lodge (England) |

| 13 October 1994 FIFA World Cup; Qualifying Group 6 | France | 2–3 | Israel | Paris, France |
| | Sauzée 29'; Ginola 39' | Match Report | Harazi 21'; Berkovic 83'; Atar 90+3' | Stadium: Parc des Princes; Attendance: 30,000; Referee: Alan Snoddy (Northern Ireland) |

| 17 November 1994 FIFA World Cup; Qualifying Group 6 | France | 1–2 | Bulgaria | Paris, France |
| | Cantona 32' | Match Report | Kostadinov 37', 90' | Stadium: Parc des Princes; Attendance: 48,402; Referee: Leslie Mottram (Scotland) |

=== 1994 ===
| 16 February International friendly | Italy | 0–1 | France | Naples, Italy |
| | | Match Report | Djorkaeff 45' | Stadium: Stadio San Paolo; Attendance: 17,241; Referee: Markus Merk (Germany) |

| 22 March International friendly | France | 3–1 | Chile | Lyon, France |
| | Papin 7'; Djorkaeff 36'; Martins 50' | Match Report | Zamorano 11' | Stadium: Stade de Gerland; Attendance: 32,000; Referee: Juan Manuel Brito Arceo (Spain) |

| 25 May International friendly | Australia | 0–1 | France | Kobe, Japan |
| | | Match Report | Cantona 43' | Stadium: Kobe Universiade Memorial Stadium; Attendance: 16,743; Referee: Masayoshi Okada (Japan) |

| 29 May International friendly | Japan | 1–4 | France | Tokyo, Japan |
| | Ogura 79' | Match Report | Djorkaeff 16'; Papin 19'; Kurosaki 54' (o.g.); Ginola 56' | Stadium: National Olympic Stadium; Attendance: 48,841; Referee: Letchmanasamy Kathirveloo (Malaysia) |

| 17 August International friendly | France | 2–2 | Czech Republic | Bordeaux, France |
| | Zidane 85', 87' | Match Report | Skuhravý 45'; Šmejkal 45' | Stadium: Parc Lescure; Attendance: 15,000; Referee: Gerd Grabher (Austria) |

| 7 September UEFA Euro 1996; Qualifying Group 1 | Slovakia | 0–0 | France | Bratislava, Slovakia |
| | | Match Report | | Stadium: Tehelné pole Attendance: 14,283; Referee: Peter Mikkelsen (Denmark) |

| 8 October UEFA Euro 1996; Qualifying Group 1 | France | 0–0 | Romania | Saint-Étienne, France |
| | | Match Report | | Stadium: Stade Geoffroy-Guichard; Attendance: 31,144; Referee: Leif Sundell (Sweden) |

| 16 November UEFA Euro 1996; Qualifying Group 1 | Poland | 0–0 | France | Zabrze, Poland |
| | | Match Report | | Stadium: Ernest Pohl Stadium; Attendance: 20,000; Referee: Peter Mikkelsen (Denmark) |

| 13 December UEFA Euro 1996; Qualifying Group 1 | Azerbaijan | 0–2 | France | Trabzon, Turkey |
| | | Match Report | Papin 24'; Loko 55' | Stadium: Hüseyin Avni Aker Stadium; Attendance: 3,000; Referee: Rune Pedersen (Norway) |

=== 1995 ===
| 18 January International friendly | Netherlands | 0–1 | France | Utrecht, Netherlands |
| | | Match Report | Loko 45' | Stadium: Stadion Galgenwaard; Attendance: 15,000; Referee: Michel Piraux (Belgium) |

| 29 March UEFA Euro 1996; Qualifying Group 1 | Israel | 0–0 | France | Ramat Gan, Israel |
| | | Match Report | | Stadium: Ramat Gan Stadium; Attendance: 45,000; Referee: Jim McCluskey (Scotland) |

| 26 April UEFA Euro 1996; Qualifying Group 1 | France | 4–0 | Slovakia | Nantes, France |
| | Krištofík 27' (o.g.); Ginola 42'; Blanc 58'; Guérin 63' | Match Report | | Stadium: Stade de la Beaujoire; Attendance: 45,000; Referee: Bernd Heynemann (Germany) |

| 22 July International friendly | Norway | 0–0 | France | Oslo, Norway |
| | | Match Report | | Stadium: Ullevaal Stadion; Attendance: 10,000; Referee: Hugo Luyten (Netherlands) |

| 16 August UEFA Euro 1996; Qualifying Group 1 | France | 1–1 | Poland | Paris, France |
| | Djorkaeff 86' | Match Report | Juskowiak 35'; Łapiński (red card) 56' | Stadium: Parc des Princes; Attendance: 40,496; Referee: Manuel Díaz Vega (Spain) |

| 6 September UEFA Euro 1996; Qualifying Group 1 | France | 10–0 | Azerbaijan | Auxerre, France |
| | Desailly 13'; Djorkaeff 18', 78'; Guérin 35'; Pedros 49'; Leboeuf 53', 74'; Dugarry 66'; Zidane 72'; Cocard 90' | Match Report | | Stadium: Stade de l'Abbé-Deschamps; Attendance: 13,479; Referee: Alfred Micallef (Malta) |

| 11 October UEFA Euro 1996; Qualifying Group 1 | Romania | 1–3 | France | Bucharest, Romania |
| | Lăcătuș 52' | Match Report | Karembeu 29'; Djorkaeff 41'; Zidane 73' | Stadium: Stadionul Steaua; Attendance: 24,000; Referee: Pierluigi Pairetto (Italy) |

| 15 November UEFA Euro 1996; Qualifying Group 1 | France | 2–0 | Israel | Caen, France |
| | Djorkaeff 69'; Lizarazu 89' | Match Report | | Stadium: Stade Michel d'Ornano; Attendance: 21,500; Referee: Gerd Grabher (Austria) |

=== 1996 ===
| 24 January International friendly | France | 3–2 | Portugal | Paris, France |
| | Djorkaeff 24', 75'; Pedros 77' | Match Report | Fernando Couto 22'; Rui Costa 30' | Stadium: Parc des Princes; Attendance: 25,725; Referee: Dermot Gallagher (England) |

| 21 February International friendly | France | 3–1 | Greece | Nîmes, France |
| | Loko 30', 47' (pen.); Zidane 49' | Match Report | Alexandris 4' | Stadium: Stade des Costières; Attendance: 23,454; Referee: Roger Philippi (Luxembourg) |

| 27 March International friendly | Belgium | 0–2 | France | Brussels, Belgium |
| | | Match Report | Albert 66' (o.g.); Lamouchi 71' | Stadium: King Baudouin Stadium; Attendance: 18,000; Referee: Fritz Stuchlik (Austria) |

| 29 May International friendly | France | 2–0 | Finland | Strasbourg, France |
| | Loko 15'; Pedros 18' | Match Report | | Stadium: Stade de la Meinau; Attendance: 27,156; Referee: Edgar Steinborn (Germany) |

| 1 June International friendly | Germany | 0–1 | France | Stuttgart, Germany |
| | | Match Report | Blanc 6' | Stadium: Gottlieb-Daimler-Stadion; Attendance: 53,235; Referee: Ryszard Wójcik (Poland) |

| 5 June International friendly | France | 2–0 | Armenia | Villeneuve-d'Ascq, France |
| | Angloma 16'; Madar 71' | Match Report | | Stadium: Stadium Lille Métropole; Attendance: 21,479; Referee: Alain Hamer (Luxembourg) |

| 10 June UEFA Euro 1996; Group B | France | 1–0 | Romania | Newcastle upon Tyne, England |
| | Dugarry 24' | Match Report | | Stadium: St James' Park; Attendance: 26,323; Referee: Hellmut Krug (German) |

| 15 June UEFA Euro 1996; Group B | France | 1–1 | Spain | Leeds, England |
| | Djorkaeff 48' | Match Report | Caminero 85' | Stadium: Elland Road; Attendance: 35,626; Referee: Vadim Zhuk (Belarus) |

| 18 June UEFA Euro 1996; Group B | Bulgaria | 1–3 | France | Newcastle upon Tyne, England |
| | Stoichkov 69' | Match Report | Blanc 20'; Penev 66' (o.g.); Loko 90' | Stadium: St James' Park; Attendance: 26,976; Referee: Dermot Gallagher / Paul Durkin (England) |

| 22 June UEFA Euro 1996; Quarter-finals | France | 0–0 (5–4 p) | Netherlands | Liverpool, England |
| | | Match Report | | Stadium: Anfield; Attendance: 37,465; Referee: Antonio López Nieto (Spain) |
| | Penalties |
| | Zidane (penalty scored); Djorkaeff (penalty scored); Lizarazu (penalty scored); Guérin (penalty scored); Blanc (penalty scored) | | (penalty scored) De Kock; (penalty scored) De Boer; (penalty scored) Kluivert; (penalty missed) Seedorf; (penalty scored) Blind |

| 26 June UEFA Euro 1996; Semi-finals | Czech Republic | 0–0 (6–5 p) | France | Manchester, England |
| | | Match Report | | Stadium: Old Trafford; Attendance: 43,877; Referee: Leslie Mottram (Scotland) |
| | Penalties |
| | (penalty scored) Kubík; (penalty scored) Nedvěd; (penalty scored) Berger; (penalty scored) Poborský; (penalty scored) Rada; (penalty scored) Kadlec | | Zidane (penalty scored); Djorkaeff (penalty scored); Lizarazu (penalty scored); Guérin (penalty scored); Blanc (penalty scored); Pedros (penalty missed) |

| 31 August International friendly | France | 2–0 | Mexico | Paris, France |
| | Ouédec 49'; Djorkaeff 53'; Leboeuf (red card) 87' | Match Report | | Stadium: Parc des Princes; Attendance: 20,491; Referee: Joseph Byrne (Republic of Ireland) |

| 9 October International friendly | France | 4–0 | Turkey | Paris, France |
| | Blanc 33'; Pedros 35'; Djorkaeff 51'; Pires 83' | Match Report | | Stadium: Parc des Princes; Attendance: 28,614; Referee: Jorge Coroado (Portugal) |

| 9 November International friendly | Denmark | 1–0 | France | Copenhagen, Denmark |
| | Pedersen 20' | Match Report | | Stadium: Parken Stadium; Attendance: 10,645; Referee: Roy Helge Olsen (Norway) |

=== 1997 ===
| 24 January International friendly | Portugal | 0–2 | France | Braga, Portugal |
| | | Match Report | Deschamps 10'; Ba 62' | Stadium: Estádio Primeiro de Maio; Attendance: 40,000; Referee: José Núñez (Spain) |

| 26 February International friendly | France | 2–1 | Netherlands | Paris, France |
| | Pires 75'; Loko 83' | Match Report | Bergkamp 3' | Stadium: Parc des Princes; Attendance: 35,331; Referee: Ryszard Wójcik (Poland) |

| 2 April International friendly | France | 1–0 | Sweden | Paris, France |
| | Djorkaeff 45' (pen.) | Match Report | | Stadium: Parc des Princes; Attendance: 35,514; Referee: Marnix Sandra (Belgium) |

| 3 June Tournoi de France | France | 1–1 | Brazil | Lyon, France |
| | Keller 60' | Match Report | Roberto Carlos 22' | Stadium: Stade de Gerland; Attendance: 28,193; Referee: Kim Milton Nielsen (Denmark) |

| 7 June Tournoi de France | France | 0–1 | England | Montpellier, France |
| | | Match Report | Shearer 86' | Stadium: Stade de la Mosson; Attendance: 21,331; Referee: Said Belqola (Morocco) |

| 11 June Tournoi de France | France | 2–2 | Italy | Paris, France |
| | Zidane 12'; Djorkaeff 73' | Match Report | Casiraghi 60'; Del Piero 90+1' (pen.) | Stadium: Parc des Princes; Attendance: 23,137; Referee: Antonio Jesús López Nieto (Spain) |

| 11 October International friendly | France | 2–1 | South Africa | Lens, France |
| | Guivarc'h 53'; Ba 83' | Match Report | Bartlett 40' | Stadium: Stade Félix-Bollaert; Attendance: 29,672; Referee: Roger Philippi (Luxembourg) |

| 12 November International friendly | France | 2–1 | Scotland | Saint-Étienne, France |
| | Laigle 35'; Djorkaeff 78' (pen.) | Match Report | Durie 36' | Stadium: Stade Geoffroy-Guichard; Attendance: 19,514; Referee: Antonio Jesús López Nieto (Spain) |

=== 1998 ===
| 28 January International friendly | France | 1–0 | Spain | Saint-Denis, France |
| | Zidane 20' | Match Report | | Stadium: Stade de France; Attendance: 78,368; Referee: Urs Meier (Switzerland) |

| 25 February International friendly | France | 3–3 | Norway | Marseille, France |
| | Blanc 23'; Zidane 28'; Desailly 90+2' | Match Report | Strandli 13'; Flo 68'; Heggem 89' | Stadium: Stade Vélodrome; Attendance: 47,124; Referee: Jan Wegereef (Netherlands) |

| 25 March International friendly | Russia | 1–0 | France | Moscow, Russia |
| | Yuran 2' | Match Report | | Stadium: Dynamo Stadium; Attendance: 7,000; Referee: Igor Yaremchuk (Ukraine) |

| 22 April International friendly | Sweden | 0–0 | France | Solna Municipality, Sweden |
| | | Match Report | | Stadium: Råsunda Stadium; Attendance: 14,018; Referee: Graham Poll (England) |

| 27 May King Hassan II; Tournament | Belgium | 0–1 | France | Casablanca, Morocco |
| | | Match Report | Zidane 63' | Stadium: Stade Mohamed V Attendance: 70,000; Referee: Mohamed Guezzaz (Morocco) |

| 29 May King Hassan II; Tournament | Morocco | 2–2 (6 – 5 p) | France | Casablanca, Morocco |
| | Bassir 9', 64' | Match Report | Blanc 23'; Djorkaeff 73' | Stadium: Stade Mohamed V Attendance: 50,000; Referee: Idrissa Seck (Senegal) |
| | Penalties |
| | Ouakili (penalty scored); Triki (penalty scored); Saber (penalty scored); Abrami (penalty missed); Hadda (penalty scored); Amzine (penalty scored); Rossi (penalty scored) | | (penalty scored) Blanc; (penalty missed) Djorkaeff; (penalty scored) Leboeuf; (penalty scored) Trezeguet; (penalty scored) Pires; (penalty scored) Vieira; (penalty missed) Candela |

| 5 June International friendly | Finland | 0–1 | France | Helsinki, Finland |
| | | Match Report | Trezeguet 84' | Stadium: Olympic Stadium; Attendance: 21,619; Referee: Konrad Plautz (Austria) |

| 12 June 1998 FIFA World Cup; Group C | France | 3–0 | South Africa | Marseille, France |
| | Dugarry 35'; Issa 78' (o.g.); Henry 90+2' | Match Report | | Stadium: Stade Vélodrome; Attendance: 55,000; Referee: Márcio Rezende de Freitas (Brazil) |

| 18 June 1998 FIFA World Cup; Group C | France | 4–0 | Saudi Arabia | Saint-Denis, France |
| | Henry 36', 77'; Trezeguet 68'; Lizarazu 85'; Zidane (red card) 70' | Match Report | Al-Khilaiwi (red card) 19' | Stadium: Stade de France; Attendance: 55,000; Referee: Arturo Brizio Carter (Mexico) |

| 24 June 1998 FIFA World Cup; Group C | France | 2–1 | Denmark | Lyon, France |
| | Djorkaeff 13' (pen.); Petit 56' | Match Report | M. Laudrup 42' (pen.) | Stadium: Stade de Gerland; Attendance: 39,100; Referee: Pierluigi Collina (Italy) |

| 28 June 1998 FIFA World Cup; Second round | France | 1–0 a.e.t. | Paraguay | Lens, France |
| | Blanc 114' | Match Report | | Stadium: Stade Félix-Bollaert; Attendance: 38,100; Referee: Ali Bujsaim (United Arab Emirates) |

| 3 July 1998 FIFA World Cup; Quarter-finals | France | 0–0 (4–3 p) | Italy | Saint-Denis, France |
| | | Match Report | | Stadium: Stade de France; Attendance: 77,000; Referee: Hugh Dallas (Scotland) |
| | Penalties |
| | (penalty scored) Zidane; (penalty missed) Lizarazu; (penalty scored) Trezeguet; (penalty scored) Henry; (penalty scored) Blanc | | R. Baggio (penalty scored); Albertini (penalty missed); Costacurta (penalty scored); Vieri (penalty scored); Di Biagio (penalty missed) |

| 8 July 1998 FIFA World Cup; Semi-finals | France | 2–1 | Croatia | Saint-Denis, France |
| | Thuram 47', 70'; Blanc (red card) 74' | Match Report | Šuker 46' | Stadium: Stade de France; Attendance: 76,000; Referee: José María García-Aranda (Spain) |

| 12 July 1998 FIFA World Cup; Final | France | 3–0 | Brazil | Saint-Denis, France |
| | Zidane 27', 45+1'; Petit 90+3'; Desailly 68' | Match Report | | Stadium: Stade de France; Attendance: 75,000; Referee: Said Belqola (Morocco) |

| 19 August International friendly | Austria | 2–2 | France | Vienna, Austria |
| | Haas 41'; Vastić 76' | Match Report | Laslandes 16'; Boghossian 83' | Stadium: Ernst-Happel-Stadion; Attendance: 44,000; Referee: Mario van der Ende (Netherlands) |

| 5 September UEFA Euro 2000; Qualifying Group 4 | Iceland | 1–1 | France | Reykjavík, Iceland |
| | Daðason 33' | Match Report | Dugarry 36' | Stadium: Laugardalsvöllur; Attendance: 10,382; Referee: Eric Blareau (Belgium) |

| 10 October UEFA Euro 2000; Qualifying Group 4 | Russia | 2–3 | France | Moscow, Russia |
| | Yanovskiy 45+1'; Mostovoi 56' | Match Report | Anelka 13'; Pires 29'; Boghossian 81' | Stadium: Luzhniki Stadium; Attendance: 20,989; Referee: Piero Ceccarini (Italy) |

| 14 October UEFA Euro 2000; Qualifying Group 4 | France | 2–0 | Andorra | Saint-Denis, France |
| | Candela 53'; Djorkaeff 59' | Match Report | | Stadium: Stade de France; Attendance: 75,428; Referee: Dani Koren (Israel) |

=== 1999 ===
| 20 January International friendly | France | 1–0 | Morocco | Marseille, France |
| | Djorkaeff 48' | Match Report | | Stadium: Stade Vélodrome; Attendance: 46,756; Referee: Alain Hamer (Luxembourg) |

| 10 February International friendly | England | 0–2 | France | London, England |
| | | Match Report | Anelka 68', 76' | Stadium: Wembley Stadium; Attendance: 74,111; Referee: Hellmut Krug (Germany) |

| 27 March UEFA Euro 2000; Qualifying Group 4 | France | 0–0 | Ukraine | Saint-Denis, France |
| | | Match Report | | Stadium: Stade de France; Attendance: 78,519; Referee: Günter Benkö (Austria) |

| 31 March UEFA Euro 2000; Qualifying Group 4 | France | 2–0 | Armenia | Saint-Denis, France |
| | Wiltord 2'; Dugarry 45+2' | Match Report | | Stadium: Stade de France; Attendance: 78,854; Referee: Giorgos Bikas (Greece) |

| 5 June UEFA Euro 2000; Qualifying Group 4 | France | 2–3 | Russia | Saint-Denis, France |
| | Petit 48'; Wiltord 53' | Match Report | Panov 38', 75'; Karpin 87' | Stadium: Stade de France; Attendance: 78,796; Referee: Paul Durkin (England) |

| 9 June UEFA Euro 2000; Qualifying Group 4 | Andorra | 0–1 | France | Barcelona, Spain |
| | A. Lima (red card) 87' | Match Report | Leboeuf 86' (pen.); Dugarry (red card) 25' | Stadium: Olympic Stadium; Attendance: 7,600; Referee: Michael Ross (Northern Ireland) |

| 18 August International friendly | Northern Ireland | 0–1 | France | Belfast, Northern Ireland |
| | | Match Report | Laslandes 67' | Stadium: Windsor Park; Attendance: 11,804; Referee: William Young (Scotland) |

| 4 September UEFA Euro 2000; Qualifying Group 4 | Ukraine | 0–0 | France | Kyiv, Ukraine |
| | | Match Report | | Stadium: Olympic Stadium; Attendance: 70,000; Referee: Hugh Dallas (Scotland) |

| 8 September UEFA Euro 2000; Qualifying Group 4 | Armenia | 2–3 | France | Yerevan, Armenia |
| | Mikaelyan 6'; Shahgeldyan 90+5' | Match Report | Djorkaeff 45+1' (pen.); Zidane 67'; Laslandes 74'; Déhu (red card) 90+3' | Stadium: Hrazdan Stadium; Attendance: 14,500; Referee: Atanas Uzunov (Bulgaria) |

| 9 October UEFA Euro 2000; Qualifying Group 4 | France | 3–2 | Iceland | Saint-Denis, France |
| | Daðason 18' (o.g.); Djorkaeff 38'; Trezeguet 71' | Match Report | Sverrisson 48'; Gunnarsson 56' | Stadium: Stade de France; Attendance: 78,391; Referee: Bernd Heynemann (Germany) |

| 13 November International friendly | France | 3–0 | Croatia | Saint-Denis, France |
| | Pires 46'; Maurice 67'; Vairelles 73' | Match Report | | Stadium: Stade de France; Attendance: 74,631; Referee: Ľuboš Micheľ (Slovakia) |
