= UEFA Euro 1988 qualifying Group 3 =

Football tournament qualification stage

Standings and results for Group 3 of the UEFA Euro 1988 qualifying tournament.

Group 3 consisted of East Germany, defending champions France, Iceland, Norway and USSR. Group winners were USSR, who finished two points clear of second-placed East Germany.

== Final table ==
Pos	Team	Pld	W	D	L	GF	GA	GD	Pts	Qualification	(Soviet Union)	(East Germany)	(France)	(Iceland)	(Norway)
1	Soviet Union	8	5	3	0	14	3	+11	13	Qualify for final tournament	—	2–0	1–1	2–0	4–0
2	East Germany	8	4	3	1	13	4	+9	11		1–1	—	0–0	2–0	3–1
3	France	8	1	4	3	4	7	−3	6		0–2	0–1	—	2–0	1–1
4	Iceland	8	2	2	4	4	14	−10	6		1–1	0–6	0–0	—	2–1
5	Norway	8	1	2	5	5	12	−7	4		0–1	0–0	2–0	0–1	—

Source: UEFA
Rules for classification: Qualification tiebreakers

== Results ==
10 September 1986

Iceland	0–0	France
	(Details)

Laugardalsvöllur, Reykjavík
Attendance: 13,758
Referee: Alan Ferguson (Scotland)

24 September 1986

Iceland	1–1	Soviet Union
Guðjohnsen 30'	(Details)	Sulakvelidze 44'

Laugardalsvöllur, Reykjavík
Attendance: 6,370
Referee: Karl-Josef Assenmacher (West Germany)
24 September 1986

Norway	0–0	East Germany
	(Details)

Ullevaal Stadion, Oslo
Attendance: 10,142
Referee: Egbert Mulder (Netherlands)

11 October 1986

France	0–2	Soviet Union
	Report	Belanov 67'; Rats 77'

Parc des Princes, Paris
Attendance: 40,496
Referee: Paolo Casarin (Italy)

29 October 1986

East Germany	2–0	Iceland
Thom 4'; Kirsten 89'	(Details)

Stadion an der Gellertstraße, Karl-Marx-Stadt
Attendance: 15,000
Referee: Zoran Petrović (Yugoslavia)
29 October 1986

Soviet Union	4–0	Norway
Lytovchenko 26'; Belanov 28' (pen.); Blokhin 33'; Khidiyatullin 54'	(Details)

Lokomotiv Stadium, Simferopol
Attendance: 26,314
Referee: Howard King (Wales)

19 November 1986

East Germany	0–0	France
	(Details)

Zentralstadion, Leipzig
Attendance: 54,578
Referee: George Courtney (England)

29 April 1987

Soviet Union	2–0	East Germany
Zavarov 41'; Belanov 49'	(Details)

Republican Stadium, Kiev
Attendance: 76,405
Referee: Erik Fredriksson (Sweden)
29 April 1987

France	2–0	Iceland
Micciche 38'; Stopyra 65'	(Details)

Parc des Princes, Paris
Attendance: 27,732
Referee: Frederick McKnight (Northern Ireland)

3 June 1987

Norway	0–1	Soviet Union
	(Details)	Zavarov 15'

Ullevaal Stadion, Oslo
Attendance: 10,473
Referee: Marcel Van Langenhove (Belgium)
3 June 1987

Iceland	0–6	East Germany
	(Details)	Minge 15'; Thom 37', 67', 89'; Doll 49'; Döschner 84'

Laugardalsvöllur, Reykjavík
Attendance: 8,758
Referee: Henning Lund-Sørensen (Denmark)

16 June 1987

Norway	2–0	France
Mordt 71'; Andersen 80'	(Details)

Ullevaal Stadion, Oslo
Attendance: 8,268
Referee: Werner Föckler (West Germany)

9 September 1987

Soviet Union	1–1	France
Mykhaylychenko 77'	(Details)	Touré 13'

Central Lenin Stadium, Moscow
Attendance: 86,048
Referee: Gerassimos Germanakos (Greece)
9 September 1987

Iceland	2–1	Norway
Pétursson 21'; Ormslev 59'	(Details)	Andersen 10'

Laugardalsvöllur, Reykjavík
Attendance: 5,450
Referee: Wilfred Wallace (Republic of Ireland)

23 September 1987

Norway	0–1	Iceland
	(Details)	Eðvaldsson 31'

Ullevaal Stadion, Oslo
Attendance: 3,540
Referee: Håkan Lundgren (Sweden)

10 October 1987

East Germany	1–1	Soviet Union
Kirsten 44'	(Details)	Aleinikov 80'

Friedrich-Ludwig-Jahn-Sportpark, East Berlin
Attendance: 18,894
Referee: Dušan Krchnak (Czechoslovakia)

14 October 1987

France	1–1	Norway
Fargeon 63'	(Details)	Sundby 80'

Parc des Princes, Paris
Attendance: 31,091
Referee: Joaquin Ramos Marcos (Spain)

28 October 1987

East Germany	3–1	Norway
Kirsten 14', 54'; Thom 33'	(Details)	Fjærestad 32'

Ernst Grube Stadium, Magdeburg
Attendance: 8,213
Referee: Friedrich Kaupe (Austria)
28 October 1987

Soviet Union	2–0	Iceland
Belanov 15'; Protasov 52'	(Details)

Lokomotiv Stadium, Simferopol
Attendance: 22,136
Referee: Michał Listkiewicz (Poland)

18 November 1987

France	0–1	East Germany
	(Details)	Ernst 90'

Parc des Princes, Paris
Attendance: 16,581
Referee: Carlos Alberto da Silva Valente (Portugal)

== Goalscorers ==
There were 40 goals scored in 20 matches, for an average of 2 goals per match.

5 goals

- (East Germany) Andreas Thom

4 goals

- (East Germany) Ulf Kirsten
- (Soviet Union) Igor Belanov

2 goals

- (Norway) Jørn Andersen
- (Soviet Union) Oleksandr Zavarov

1 goal

- (East Germany) Thomas Doll
- (East Germany) Matthias Döschner
- (East Germany) Rainer Ernst
- (East Germany) Ralf Minge
- (France) Philippe Fargeon
- (France) Carmelo Micciche
- (France) Yannick Stopyra
- (France) José Touré
- (Iceland) Atli Eðvaldsson
- (Iceland) Arnór Guðjohnsen
- (Iceland) Pétur Ormslev
- (Iceland) Pétur Pétursson
- (Norway) Jan Kristian Fjærestad
- (Norway) Per Edmund Mordt
- (Norway) Tom Sundby
- (Soviet Union) Sergei Aleinikov
- (Soviet Union) Oleg Blokhin
- (Soviet Union) Vagiz Khidiyatullin
- (Soviet Union) Hennadiy Lytovchenko
- (Soviet Union) Oleksiy Mykhaylychenko
- (Soviet Union) Oleh Protasov
- (Soviet Union) Vasyl Rats
- (Soviet Union) Tengiz Sulakvelidze
