= UEFA Euro 1988 qualifying Group 6 =

Football tournament qualification stage

Standings and results for Group 6 of the UEFA Euro 1988 qualifying tournament.

Group 6 consisted of Czechoslovakia, Denmark, Finland and Wales. Group winners were Denmark, who finished one point clear of second-placed Czechoslovakia.

== Final table ==
Pos	Team	Pld	W	D	L	GF	GA	GD	Pts	Qualification	(Denmark)	(Czechoslovakia)	(Wales)	(Finland)
1	Denmark	6	3	2	1	4	2	+2	8	Qualify for final tournament	—	1–1	1–0	1–0
2	Czechoslovakia	6	2	3	1	7	5	+2	7		0–0	—	2–0	3–0
3	Wales	6	2	2	2	7	5	+2	6		1–0	1–1	—	4–0
4	Finland	6	1	1	4	4	10	−6	3		0–1	3–0	1–1	—

Source: UEFA
Rules for classification: Qualification tiebreakers

== Results ==
10 September 1986

Finland	1–1	Wales
Hjelm 11'	(Details)	Slatter 68'

Olympic Stadium, Helsinki
Attendance: 9,840
Referee: Gerald Losert (Austria)

15 October 1986

Czechoslovakia	3–0	Finland
Janečka 28'; Knoflíček 43'; Kula 67'	(Details)

Stadion Za Lužánkami, Brno
Attendance: 26,351
Referee: Gerassimos Germanakos (Greece)

29 October 1986

Denmark	1–0	Finland
Bertelsen 68'	(Details)

Idrætsparken, Copenhagen
Attendance: 40,300
Referee: Thomas Oliver Donnelly (Northern Ireland)

12 November 1986

Czechoslovakia	0–0	Denmark
	(Details)

Tehelné pole, Bratislava
Attendance: 47,042
Referee: Alexis Ponnet (Belgium)

1 April 1987

Wales	4–0	Finland
Rush 7'; Hodges 28'; Phillips 63'; Jones 86'	(Details)

Racecourse Ground, Wrexham
Attendance: 7,696
Referee: Ignace van Swieten (Netherlands)

29 April 1987

Finland	0–1	Denmark
	(Details)	Mølby 53'

Olympic Stadium, Helsinki
Attendance: 29,197
Referee: Dimitar Dimitrov (Bulgaria)
29 April 1987

Wales	1–1	Czechoslovakia
Rush 82'	(Details)	Knoflíček 74'

Racecourse Ground, Wrexham
Attendance: 14,150
Referee: Krzysztof Czemarmazowicz (Poland)

3 June 1987

Denmark	1–1	Czechoslovakia
Mølby 16'	(Details)	Hašek 48'

Idrætsparken, Copenhagen
Attendance: 46,300
Referee: Claudio Pieri (Italy)

9 September 1987

Finland	3–0	Czechoslovakia
Hjelm 29'; Lius 71'; Tiainen 82'	(Details

Olympic Stadium, Helsinki
Attendance: 6,430
Referee: Neil Midgley (England)
9 September 1987

Wales	1–0	Denmark
Hughes 19'	(Details)

Ninian Park, Cardiff
Attendance: 20,535
Referee: Siegfried Kirschen (East Germany)

14 October 1987

Denmark	1–0	Wales
Elkjær 50'	(Details)

Idrætsparken, Copenhagen
Attendance: 44,500
Referee: Ioan Igna (Romania)

11 November 1987

Czechoslovakia	2–0	Wales
Knoflíček 32'; Bílek 89'	(Details)

Letna Stadium, Prague
Attendance: 6,443
Referee: Erik Fredriksson (Sweden)

== Goalscorers ==
There were 22 goals scored in 12 matches, for an average of 1.83 goals per match.

3 goals

- (Czechoslovakia) Ivo Knoflíček

2 goals

- (Denmark) Jan Mølby
- (Finland) Ari Hjelm
- (Wales) Ian Rush

1 goal

- (Czechoslovakia) Michal Bílek
- (Czechoslovakia) Ivan Hašek
- (Czechoslovakia) Petr Janečka
- (Czechoslovakia) Karel Kula
- (Denmark) Jens Jørn Bertelsen
- (Denmark) Preben Elkjær
- (Finland) Ismo Lius
- (Finland) Petri Tiainen
- (Wales) Glyn Hodges
- (Wales) Mark Hughes
- (Wales) Andy Jones
- (Wales) David Phillips
- (Wales) Neil Slatter
