= Lokomotiv Republican Sports Complex =

Multi-purpose stadium in Simferopol, Crimean peninsula

Respublikanskiy Sports Complex (RSC) Lokomotiv
- Lokomotiv Stadium
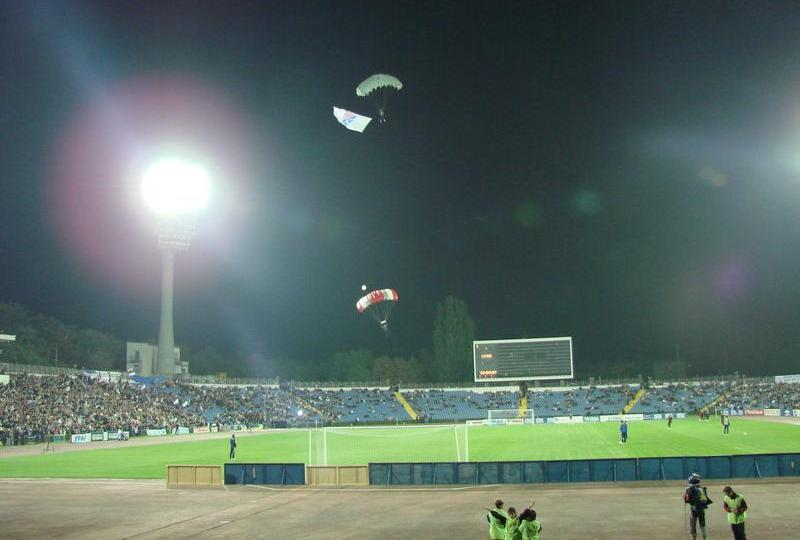
- Interactive map of Respublikanskiy Sports Complex (RSC) Lokomotiv
- Location: Simferopol, Crimea
- Coordinates: 44°56′37″N 34°05′23″E
- Capacity: 19,978
- Surface: Grass

Construction
- Opened: 1967
- Renovated: 2004

Tenants
- SC Tavriya Simferopol (1967–2014); FC TSK Simferopol (2014–)

Lokomotiv Stadium (Tavriya, Ukrainian: РСК «Локомотив» / Таврія) is a multi-purpose stadium in Simferopol, Crimea. It is currently used mostly for football matches as the home of FC TSK Simferopol and formerly SC Tavriya Simferopol. The stadium holds 19,978 people and was built in 1967, renovated in 2004.

The stadium hosted a friendly between the USSR and Bulgaria in 1979. Remarkably, the stadium was the base stadium during UEFA Euro 1988 qualifying for the USSR. The stadium hosted two of the four home games of the qualifying campaign with matches against the national teams of Norway and Iceland. Both games gathered crowds of more than 30,000 people. One other game was played in Kiev and the other one in Moscow. Later, on 15 November 1989, the stadium also hosted a game of the 1990 FIFA World Cup qualification against the national team of Turkey.

The stadium was one of three Ukrainian-based home stadiums for the USSR. The other stadiums used were Republican stadium in Kyiv (12 matches) and Central Stadium of the Black Sea Shipping Company in Odesa (one match).

In 2015, TSK-Tavria played a home cup match with SKChF Sevastopol at the stadium.

== Soviet national team results in Simferopol ==
March 28, 1979

Soviet Union	3 – 1	Bulgaria
Blokhin 5'; Shengalia 7'; Gavrilov 83'		Panov 29'

Lokomotiv Stadium, Simferopol
Attendance: 25,000
Referee: Andrzej Suchanek (POL)

October 29, 1986

Soviet Union	4 – 0	Norway
Lytovchenko 26'; Belanov 28' (pen.); Blokhin 33'; Khidiyatullin 54'

Lokomotiv Stadium, Simferopol
Attendance: 35,000
Referee: Howard King (WAL)

October 28, 1987

Soviet Union	2 – 0	Iceland
Belanov 15'; Protasov 52'

Lokomotiv Stadium, Simferopol
Attendance: 40,000
Referee: Michał Listkiewicz (POL)

November 15, 1989

Soviet Union	2 – 0	Turkey
Protasov 68', 79'

Lokomotiv Stadium, Simferopol
Attendance: 28,000
Referee: Dieter Pauly (West Germany)
