= UEFA Euro 1988 qualifying Group 4 =

Football tournament qualification stage

Standings and results for Group 4 of the UEFA Euro 1988 qualifying tournament.

Group 4 consisted of England, Northern Ireland, Turkey and Yugoslavia. Group winners were England, who finished 3 points clear of second-placed Yugoslavia.

== Final table ==
Pos	Team	Pld	W	D	L	GF	GA	GD	Pts	Qualification	(England)	(Socialist Federal Republic of Yugoslavia)	(Northern Ireland)	(Turkey)
1	England	6	5	1	0	19	1	+18	11	Qualify for final tournament	—	2–0	3–0	8–0
2	Yugoslavia	6	4	0	2	13	9	+4	8		1–4	—	3–0	4–0
3	Northern Ireland	6	1	1	4	2	10	−8	3		0–2	1–2	—	1–0
4	Turkey	6	0	2	4	2	16	−14	2		0–0	2–3	0–0	—

Source: UEFA
Rules for classification: Qualification tiebreakers

== Results ==
15 October 1986

England	3–0	Northern Ireland
Lineker 33', 80'; Waddle 75'	(Details)

Wembley, London
Attendance: 35,304
Referee: Alphonse Costantin (Belgium)

29 October 1986

Yugoslavia	4–0	Turkey
Zl. Vujović 25', 33', 83'; Savićević 73'	(Details)

Poljud, Split
Attendance: 11,270
Referee: Carlo Longhi (Italy)

12 November 1986

Turkey	0–0	Northern Ireland
	(Details)

Alsancak Stadı, İzmir
Attendance: 21,919
Referee: Ștefan Dan Petrescu (Romania)
12 November 1986

England	2–0	Yugoslavia
Mabbutt 21'; Anderson 57'	(Details)

Wembley, London
Attendance: 60,000
Referee: Franz Wöhrer (Austria)

1 April 1987

Northern Ireland	0–2	England
	(Details)	Robson 19'; Waddle 42'

Windsor Park, Belfast
Attendance: 20,578
Referee: Emilio Soriano Aladrén (Spain)

29 April 1987

Turkey	0–0	England
	(Details)

Alsancak Stadı, İzmir
Attendance: 16,017
Referee: Valeri Butenko (Soviet Union)
29 April 1987

Northern Ireland	1–2	Yugoslavia
Clarke 40'	(Details)	Stojković 47'; Zl. Vujović 80'

Windsor Park, Belfast
Attendance: 5,482
Referee: Werner Föckler (West Germany)

14 October 1987

Yugoslavia	3–0	Northern Ireland
Vokrri 12', 34'; Hadžibegić 74' (pen.)	(Details)

Grbavica, Sarajevo
Attendance: 14,075
Referee: Klaus Peschel (East Germany)
14 October 1987

England	8–0	Turkey
Barnes 1', 28'; Lineker 8', 42', 71'; Robson 59'; Beardsley 62'; Webb 88'	(Details)

Wembley, London
Attendance: 45,528
Referee: Albert Thomas (Netherlands)

11 November 1987

Yugoslavia	1–4	England
Katanec 80'	(Details)	Beardsley 3'; Barnes 17'; Robson 20'; Adams 25'

Stadion Crvene Zvezde, Belgrade
Attendance: 49,744
Referee: Michel Vautrot (France)
11 November 1987

Northern Ireland	1–0	Turkey
Quinn 47'	(Details)

Windsor Park, Belfast
Attendance: 3,931
Referee: Peter Mikkelsen (Denmark)

16 December 1987

Turkey	2–3	Yugoslavia
Yusuf 68'; Feyyaz 73'	(Details)	Radanović 5'; Katanec 40'; Hadžibegić 54' (pen.)

Alsancak Stadı, İzmir
Attendance: 4,657
Referee: Bruno Galler (Switzerland)

== Goalscorers ==
There were 36 goals scored in 12 matches, for an average of 3 goals per match.

5 goals

- (England national football team) Gary Lineker

4 goals

- (Yugoslavia national football team) Zlatko Vujović

3 goals

- (England national football team) John Barnes

2 goals

- (England national football team) Peter Beardsley
- (England national football team) Bryan Robson
- (England national football team) Chris Waddle
- (Yugoslavia national football team) Faruk Hadžibegić
- (Yugoslavia national football team) Srečko Katanec
- (Yugoslavia national football team) Fadil Vokrri

1 goal

- (England national football team) Tony Adams
- (England national football team) Viv Anderson
- (England national football team) Steve Hodge
- (England national football team) Gary Mabbutt
- (England national football team) Neil Webb
- (Northern Ireland national football team) Colin Clarke
- (Northern Ireland national football team) Jimmy Quinn
- (Turkey national football team) Yusuf Altıntaş
- (Turkey national football team) Feyyaz Uçar
- (Yugoslavia national football team) Ljubomir Radanović
- (Yugoslavia national football team) Dejan Savićević
- (Yugoslavia national football team) Dragan Stojković
