= 1986 Ballon d'Or =

Annual association football award event in France

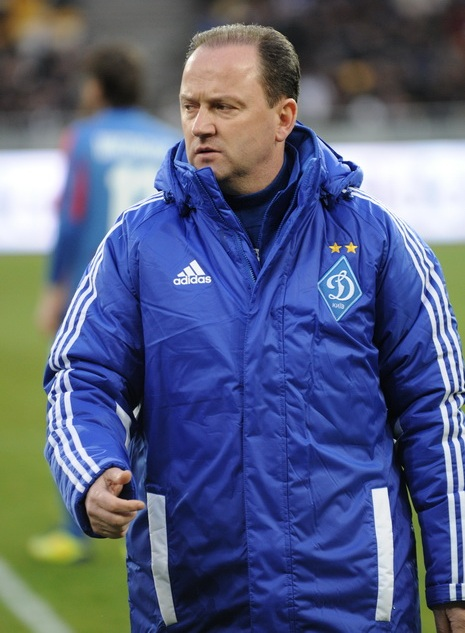
- 1986 Ballon d'Or winner, Igor Belanov in 2012
- Date: 30 December 1986
- Presented by: France Football

Highlights
- Won by: (Soviet Union) Igor Belanov (1st award)
- Website: ballondor.com

The 1986 Ballon d'Or, given to the best football player in Europe as judged by a panel of sports journalists from UEFA member countries, was awarded to Soviet forward Igor Belanov on 30 December 1986. There were 26 voters, from Austria, Belgium, Bulgaria, Czechoslovakia, Denmark, East Germany, England, Finland, France, Greece, Hungary, Italy, Luxembourg, the Netherlands, Poland, Portugal, Republic of Ireland, Romania, Scotland, Soviet Union, Spain, Sweden, Switzerland, Turkey, West Germany and Yugoslavia. Belanov became the second Ukrainian national to win the award after Oleg Blokhin (1975).

== Rankings ==
Rank	Name	Club(s)	Nationality	Points
1	Igor Belanov	(Soviet Union) Dynamo Kyiv	Soviet Union	84
2	Gary Lineker	(England) Everton (Spain) Barcelona	England	62
3	Emilio Butragueño	(Spain) Real Madrid	Spain	59
4	Manuel Amoros	(France) Monaco	France	22
4	Preben Elkjær	(Italy) Hellas Verona	Denmark	22
6	Ian Rush	(England) Liverpool	Wales	20
6	Oleksandr Zavarov	(Soviet Union) Dynamo Kyiv	Soviet Union	20
8	Helmut Duckadam	(Romania) Steaua București	Romania	10
8	Marco van Basten	(Netherlands) Ajax	Netherlands	10
10	Alessandro Altobelli	(Italy) Internazionale	Italy	9
11	Jean-Marie Pfaff	(West Germany) Bayern Munich	Belgium	8
11	Michel Platini	(Italy) Juventus	France	8
13	Jan Ceulemans	(Belgium) Club Brugge	Belgium	7
13	Søren Lerby	(France) Monaco	Denmark	7
15	Morten Olsen	(Belgium) Anderlecht (West Germany) 1. FC Köln	Denmark	6
16	Rinat Dasayev	(Soviet Union) Spartak Moscow	Soviet Union	5
17	Luis Fernández	(France) Paris Saint-Germain (France) RC Paris	France	4
17	Paulo Futre	(Portugal) Porto	Portugal	4
17	Ruud Gullit	(Netherlands) PSV Eindhoven	Netherlands	4
17	Harald Schumacher	(West Germany) 1. FC Köln	West Germany	4
21	Kenny Dalglish	(England) Liverpool	Scotland	3
21	Jean Tigana	(France) Bordeaux	France	3
21	Pavlo Yakovenko	(Soviet Union) Dynamo Kyiv	Soviet Union	3
24	Karlheinz Förster	(West Germany) VfB Stuttgart (France) Marseille	West Germany	2
24	Lothar Matthäus	(West Germany) Bayern Munich	West Germany	2
26	Michael Laudrup	(Italy) Juventus	Denmark	1
26	Rudi Völler	(West Germany) Werder Bremen	West Germany	1
