= UEFA Euro 1988 qualifying Group 1 =

European association football tournament

Standings and results for Group 1 of the UEFA Euro 1988 qualifying tournament.

Group 1 consisted of Albania, Austria, Romania and Spain. Group winners were Spain, who finished 1 point clear of second-placed Romania.

== Final table ==
Pos	Team	Pld	W	D	L	GF	GA	GD	Pts	Qualification	(Spain)	(Romania)	(Austria)	(Albania)
1	Spain	6	5	0	1	14	6	+8	10	Qualify for final tournament	—	1–0	2–0	5–0
2	Romania	6	4	1	1	13	3	+10	9		3–1	—	4–0	5–1
3	Austria	6	2	1	3	6	9	−3	5		2–3	0–0	—	3–0
4	Albania	6	0	0	6	2	17	−15	0		1–2	0–1	0–1	—

Source: UEFA
Rules for classification: Qualification tiebreakers

== Results ==
10 September 1986

Romania	4–0	Austria
Iovan 44', 64'; Lăcătuș 61'; Hagi 90'	(Details)

Steaua Stadium, Bucharest
Attendance: 13,611
Referee: Gérard Biguet (France)

15 October 1986

Austria	3–0	Albania
Ogris 18'; Polster 66'; Linzmaier 77'	(Details)

Liebenau Stadium, Graz
Attendance: 5,456
Referee: Klaus Peschel (East Germany)

12 November 1986

Spain	1–0	Romania
Míchel 57'	(Details)

Benito Villamarín Stadium, Seville
Attendance: 41,884
Referee: Jan Keizer (Netherlands)

3 December 1986

Albania	1–2	Spain
Muça 27'	(Details)	Arteche 67'; Joaquín 84'

Qemal Stafa Stadium, Tirana
Attendance: 18,900
Referee: Antal Hutak (Hungary)

25 March 1987

Romania	5–1	Albania
Pițurcă 2'; Bölöni 42'; Hagi 44' (pen.); Belodedici 54'; Bumbescu 70'	(Details)	Muça 35'

Steaua Stadium, Bucharest
Attendance: 6,154
Referee: José Rosa dos Santos (Portugal)

1 April 1987

Austria	2–3	Spain
Linzmaier 38'; Polster 63'	(Details)	Eloy 30', 57'; Carrasco 89'

Praterstadion, Vienna
Attendance: 31,342
Referee: Bruno Galler (Switzerland)

29 April 1987

Albania	0–1	Austria
	(Details)	Polster 8'

Qemal Stafa Stadium, Tirana
Attendance: 17,250
Referee: Gerassimos Germanakos (Greece)
29 April 1987

Romania	3–1	Spain
Pițurcă 38'; Mateuț 45'; Ungureanu 45+3'	(Details)	Calderé 81'

Steaua Stadium, Bucharest
Attendance: 30,000
Referee: Alexis Ponnet (Belgium)

14 October 1987

Spain	2–0	Austria
Míchel 58' (pen.); Sanchís 64'	(Details)

Estadio Ramón Sánchez Pizjuán, Seville
Attendance: 57,477
Referee: Joël Quiniou (France)

28 October 1987

Albania	0–1	Romania
	(Details)	Klein 61'

Stadiumi Flamurtari, Vlorë
Attendance: 8,480
Referee: Ignace van Swieten (Netherlands)

18 November 1987

Austria	0–0	Romania
	(Details)

Praterstadion, Vienna
Attendance: 4,120
Referee: Rosario Lo Bello (Italy)
18 November 1987

Spain	5–0	Albania
Bakero 5', 31', 74'; Míchel 36' (pen.); Llorente 67'	(Details)

Benito Villamarín Stadium, Seville
Attendance: 45,299
Referee: Kurt Röthlisberger (Switzerland)

== Goalscorers ==
There were 35 goals scored in 12 matches, for an average of 2.92 goals per match.

3 goals

- (Austria national football team) Toni Polster
- (Spain national football team) José Mari Bakero
- (Spain national football team) Míchel

2 goals

- (Austria national football team) Manfred Linzmaier
- (Romania national football team) Gheorghe Hagi
- (Romania national football team) Ștefan Iovan
- (Romania national football team) Victor Pițurcă
- (Spain national football team) Eloy Olaya

1 goal

- (Albania national football team) Sokol Kushta
- (Albania national football team) Shkëlqim Muça
- (Austria national football team) Andreas Ogris
- (Romania national football team) Miodrag Belodedici
- (Romania national football team) László Bölöni
- (Romania national football team) Adrian Bumbescu
- (Romania national football team) Michael Klein
- (Romania national football team) Marius Lăcătuș
- (Romania national football team) Dorin Mateuț
- (Romania national football team) Nicolae Ungureanu
- (Spain national football team) Juan Carlos Arteche
- (Spain national football team) Ramón Calderé
- (Spain national football team) Lobo Carrasco
- (Spain national football team) Joaquín
- (Spain national football team) Francisco Llorente
- (Spain national football team) Manuel Sanchís
