= Michael Klein (footballer, born 1959) =

Romanian footballer (1959–1993)

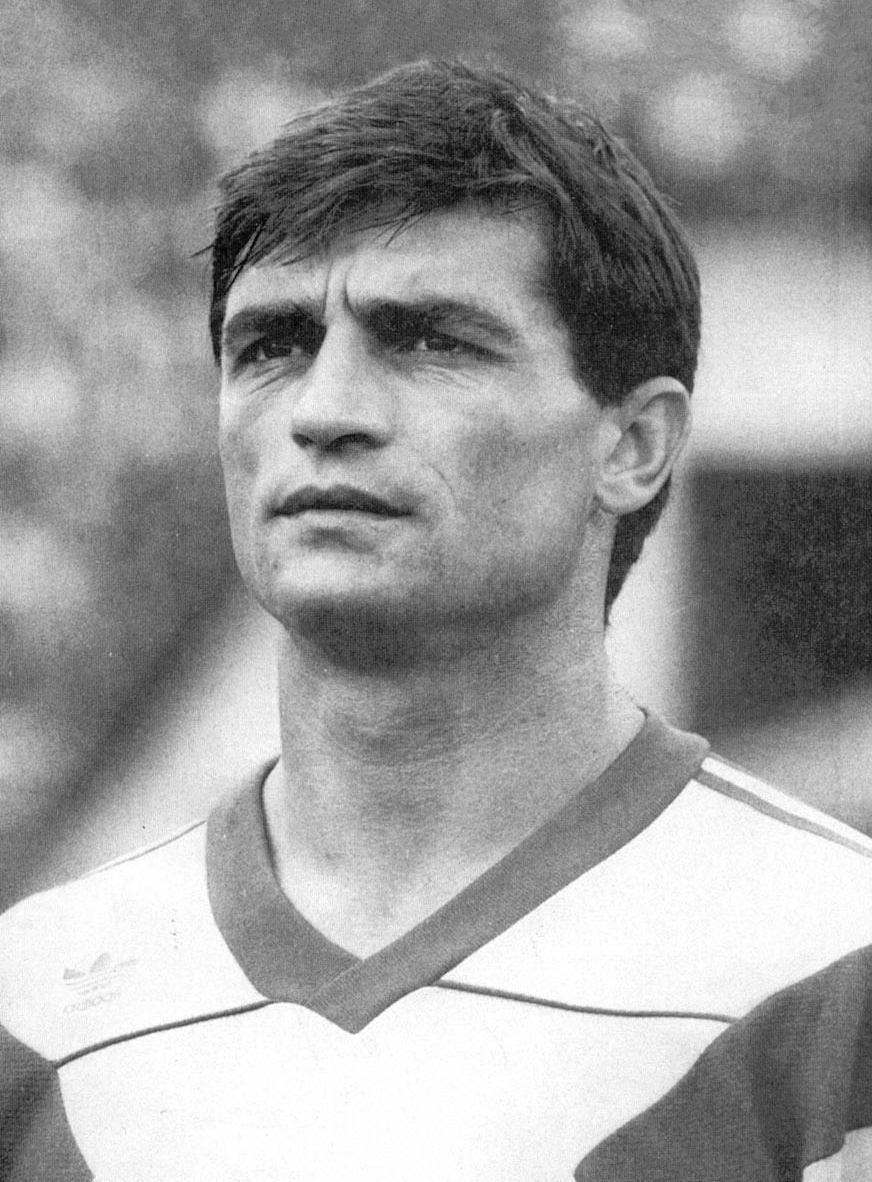
- Klein in 1990

Personal information
- Date of birth: 10 October 1959
- Place of birth: Amnaș, Romania
- Date of death: 2 February 1993 (aged 33)
- Place of death: Krefeld, Germany
- Height: 1.77 m (5 ft 10 in)
- Position: Left-back

Youth career
- 1973–1977: Corvinul Hunedoara

Senior career*
Years	Team	Apps	(Gls)
1977–1988	Corvinul Hunedoara	313	(37)
1978	→ Aurul Brad (loan)	15	(3)
1989–1990	Dinamo București	40	(2)
1990–1993	Bayer Uerdingen	62	(0)
Total		430	(42)

International career
1979–1981	Romania U21	17	(1)
1984	Romania Olympic	1	(0)
1981–1991	Romania	89	(5)

Managerial career
- 1986–1988: Corvinul Hunedoara (assistant)
- * Club domestic league appearances and goals

Michael "Mișa" Klein (10 October 1959 – 2 February 1993) was a Romanian professional footballer who played as a left-back.

== Early years ==
Klein, nicknamed Mișa, was born on 10 October 1959 in Amnaș, Romania and was of Transylvanian Saxon origin. He grew up admiring footballer Ion Dumitru.

== Club career ==
Klein began playing football at Corvinul Hunedoara's youth center in 1973. He made his debut for the senior team on 24 August 1977 under coach Ștefan Coidum in a Divizia A match that ended in a 2–2 draw against Argeș Pitești. In the following season, he was loaned to Divizia B team Aurul Brad, only to be recalled mid-season by Corvinul's new coach Mircea Lucescu, who made him captain at age 19. At the end of that season, the team was relegated to Divizia B, but Klein stayed with the club, helping it get promoted back to the first division after one year. Afterwards he helped the club finish third in the 1981–82 Divizia A. He also appeared in all four games in the 1982–83 UEFA Cup campaign and scored once as they got past Grazer AK in the first round, being eliminated in the following one by FK Sarajevo. For the way he played in 1985, Klein was placed fifth in the ranking for the Romanian Footballer of the Year award.

After 11 and a half seasons spent with The Ravens, in the middle of the 1988–89 season he was transferred to Dinamo București where he reunited with his former Corvinul manager Mircea Lucescu. In his first season spent with The Red Dogs, he played in both legs of the 1988–89 European Cup Winners' Cup quarter-finals, where they were eliminated on the away goals rule after 1–1 on aggregate by Sampdoria.

In the following season, Klein won The Double with the club, Lucescu giving him 23 appearances in which he scored two goals in the league, and he also played the entire match in the 6–4 win over rivals Steaua București in the Cupa României final. In the same season he played seven matches in the 1989–90 European Cup Winners' Cup, scoring once against Panathinaikos, as the team reached the semi-finals where they were eliminated after a 2–0 aggregate loss to Anderlecht.

Afterwards, Klein joined Bayer Uerdingen in Germany, making his Bundesliga debut on 14 September 1990 when coach Horst Wohlers used him the entire match in a 2–0 away loss to Karlsruher SC. The team was relegated at the end of his first season, but he stayed with the club, helping it get promoted back after one year. Also during his period spent in Germany he was teammates with compatriot Daniel Timofte.

== International career ==
Klein played 89 matches and scored five goals for Romania, making his debut on 9 September 1981 when coach Valentin Stănescu sent him on at halftime to replace Aurel Beldeanu in a 2–1 friendly loss to Bulgaria.

His next appearance was a 0–0 draw against Switzerland in the 1982 World Cup qualifiers. He scored his first two goals in a friendly that ended with a 3–2 victory over Chile. Klein made seven appearances in the successful Euro 1984 qualifiers in which he scored one goal with a scissors kick in a 2–0 win against Sweden. Coach Mircea Lucescu used him for the entirety of all three games in the final tournament which were a draw against Spain and losses to West Germany and Portugal, as his side failed to progress from their group. Klein played seven matches in the 1986 World Cup qualifiers and six matches with one goal scored in a 1–0 away victory against Albania during the Euro 1988 qualifiers. Afterwards he made five appearances in the successful 1990 World Cup qualifiers. He was used by coach Emerich Jenei for the entirety of all four matches in the final tournament, as Romania got eliminated by Ireland in the round of 16. Klein played six games in the Euro 1992 qualifiers and in the last one of them, he made his final appearance for the national team which took place on 13 November 1991 in a 1–0 victory against Switzerland.

== Coaching career ==
While still an active player, Klein served as an assistant coach at Corvinul Hunedoara from 1986 to 1988.

== Death and legacy ==
On 2 February 1993, Klein died of a heart attack during a training session with Bayer Uerdingen at the age of 33.

Klein has a total of 322 matches with 36 goals in Divizia A, 37 matches in Bundesliga, 25 games in 2. Bundesliga and 13 appearances with two goals in European competitions.

The Stadionul Michael Klein in Hunedoara is named in his honor, and a statue of Klein is placed in front of the stadium. A book about him was written by Nicolae Stanciu, titled Klein, căpitanul lui Lucescu. Cronici sentimentale (Klein, Lucescu's captain. Sentimental chronicles).

== Career statistics ==
Appearances and goals by national team and year
National team	Year	Apps	Goals
Romania	1981	2	0
Romania	1982	11	4
Romania	1983	13	0
Romania	1984	9	0
Romania	1985	8	0
Romania	1986	9	0
Romania	1987	8	1
Romania	1988	8	0
Romania	1989	6	0
Romania	1990	11	0
Romania	1991	4	0
Total		89	5

Scores and results list Romania's goal tally first, score column indicates score after each Klein goal.

List of international goals scored by Michael Klein
No.	Date	Venue	Opponent	Score	Result	Competition
1	18 May 1982	Estadio Nacional de Chile, Ñuñoa, Chile	Chile	1–0	3–2	Friendly
2	18 May 1982	Estadio Nacional de Chile, Ñuñoa, Chile	Chile	2–0	3–2	Friendly
3	15 July 1982	Stadionul Areni, Suceava, Romania	Japan	1–0	4–0	Friendly
4	8 September 1982	Stadionul 23 August, Bucharest, Romania	Sweden	2–0	2–0	UEFA Euro 1984 qualifying
5	28 October 1987	Flamurtari Stadium, Vlorë, Albania	Albania	1–0	1–0	UEFA Euro 1988 qualifying

== Honours ==
Corvinul Hunedoara

- Divizia B: 1979–80

Dinamo București

- Divizia A: 1989–90
- Cupa României: 1989–90

Bayer Uerdingen

- 2. Bundesliga: 1991–92

Individual

- Gazeta Sporturilor Romanian Footballer of the Year (fifth place): 1985
