= Ismo Lius =

Finnish footballer (born 1965)

Personal information
- Date of birth: 30 November 1965 (age 60)
- Place of birth: Lahti, Finland
- Height: 1.72 m (5 ft 8 in)
- Position: Forward

Senior career*
Years	Team	Apps	(Gls)
1983–1989	Kuusysi Lahti	159	(105)
1990	Örgryte IS	1	(0)
1991–1992	HJK Helsinki	59	(39)
1993	Kuusysi Lahti	21	(11)
1994–1996	HJK Helsinki	62	(23)
1997	RoPS	27	(10)
1998–1999	FC Lahti	23	(19)
1999	FC Hämeenlinna	12	(9)
Total		364	(216)

International career
1986–1990	Finland	36	(3)
- * Club domestic league appearances and goals

Ismo Lius (born 30 November 1965) is a Finnish former professional footballer who played as a forward. During his club career, Lius played for Kuusysi Lahti, Örgryte IS, HJK Helsinki, RoPS and FC Hämeenlinna. Lius led the league in goal-scoring during 1986, 1986, 1988 and 1989. He made 36 appearances for the Finland national team, scoring 3 goals.

== International goals ==
As of match played 22 October 1989. Finland score listed first, score column indicates score after each Lius goal.

List of international goals scored by Ismo Lius
No.	Date	Venue	Opponent	Score	Result	Competition
1	28 May 1987	Helsinki Olympic Stadium, Helsinki, Finland	Brazil	2–3	2–3	Friendly
2	9 September 1987	Helsinki Olympic Stadium, Helsinki, Finland	Czechoslovakia	2–0	3–0	UEFA Euro 1988 qualifying
3	22 October 1989	Hasely Crawford Stadium, Port of Spain, Trinidad and Tobago	Trinidad and Tobago	1–0	1–0	Friendly
