= Petri Tiainen =

Finnish footballer (born 1966)

Personal information
- Full name: Petri Tiainen
- Date of birth: 26 September 1966 (age 60)
- Place of birth: Lahti, Finland
- Height: 1.74 m (5 ft 9 in)
- Position: Midfielder

Senior career*
Years	Team	Apps	(Gls)
1984–1986	Kuusysi	38	(5)
1986–1989	Ajax	8	(0)
1989–1992	HJK Helsinki	66	(4)
1994–1997	MYPA	70	(13)
1998	FC Lahti	17	(0)

International career
1986–1995	Finland	15	(2)
- * Club domestic league appearances and goals

Petri Tiainen (born 26 September 1966) is a retired Finnish former football attacking midfielder.

He played for Kuusysi Lahti from 1984 to 1986, AFC Ajax from 1986 to 1989, HJK Helsinki from 1989 to 1992, MyPa from 1994 to 1997 and FC Lahti in 1998. He was capped 13 times for Finland, scoring 2 goals. He won the Finnish Footballer of the Year award in 1986.

== Career statistics ==
=== Club ===
As of 1 September 2024.

Appearances and goals by club, season and competition
Club	Season	League			Cup (Note: Includes Suomen Cup)		Europe		Total	
Club	Season	Division	Apps	Goals	Apps	Goals	Apps	Goals	Apps	Goals
Kuusysi	1984	Mestaruussarja	6	0	–		–		6	0
Kuusysi	1985	Mestaruussarja	15	2	–		5 (Note: Appearances in European Cup)	0	20	2
Kuusysi	1986	Mestaruussarja	17	3	–		–		17	3
Kuusysi	Total		38	4	0	0	5	0	43	4
Ajax	1986–87	Eredivisie	5	0	0	0	0	0	5	0
Ajax	1987–88	Eredivisie	3	0	2	0	–		5	0
Ajax	Total		8	0	2	0	0	0	10	0
HJK	1989	Mestaruussarja	20	3	0	0	2	0	22	3
HJK	1990	Veikkausliiga	9	0	–		–		9	0
HJK	1991	Veikkausliiga	14	0	–		0	0	14	0
HJK	1992	Veikkausliiga	23	1	–		0	0	23	1
HJK	Total		66	4	0	0	2	0	68	4
MYPA	1994	Veikkausliiga	21	3	–		1 (Note: Appearance(s) in UEFA Cup)	0	22	3
MYPA	1995	Veikkausliiga	19	7	–		4	1	23	8
MYPA	1996	Veikkausliiga	15	2	–		–		15	2
MYPA	1997	Veikkausliiga	15	1	–		–		15	1
MYPA	Total		70	13	0	0	5	1	75	14
Lahti	1998	Ykkönen	17	0	–		–		17	0
Career total			199	21	2	0	12	1	213	22

=== International goals ===
As of match played 12 February 1990. Finland score listed first, score column indicates score after each Tiainen goal.

List of international goals scored by Petri Tiainen
No.	Date	Venue	Opponent	Score	Result	Competition
1	9 September 1987	Helsinki Olympic Stadium, Helsinki, Finland	Czechoslovakia	3–0	3–0	UEFA Euro 1988 qualifying
2	12 February 1990	Zayed Sports City Stadium, Abu Dhabi, United Arab Emirates	United Arab Emirates	1–0	1–1	Friendly
