= Pétur Pétursson =

Icelandic footballer

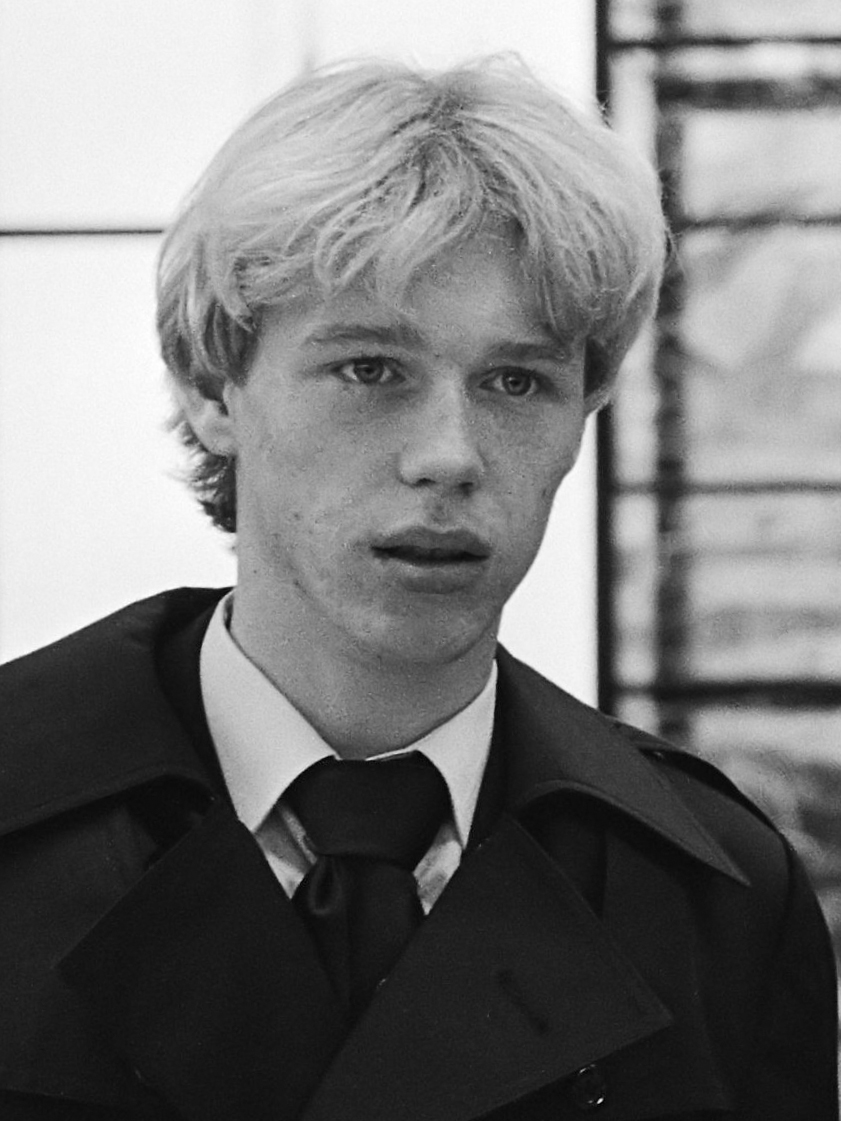

Personal information
- Full name: Pétur Pétursson
- Date of birth: 27 June 1959 (age 67)
- Place of birth: Akranes, Iceland
- Position: Striker

Youth career
- ÍA

Senior career*
Years	Team	Apps	(Gls)
1976–1978	ÍA	49	(39)
1978–1981	Feyenoord	69	(42)
1981–1982	RSC Anderlecht	15	(4)
1982–1984	Royal Antwerp FC	56	(13)
1984–1985	Feyenoord	19	(7)
1985–1986	Hércules CF	27	(5)
1986	ÍA	5	(3)
1986–1987	Hércules CF	0	(0)
1987–1991	KR	75	(31)
1992–1993	Tindastóll	12	(1)

International career
1978–1990	Iceland	41	(11)

Managerial career
- 1994–1995: Keflavík
- 1995–1996: Víkingur
- 2000–2001: KR
- 2007–2011: Iceland (Assistant manager)
- 2008–2014: KR (Assistant manager)
- 2015: Fram
- 2017: HK (Assistant manager)
- 2017–: Valur (women's)
- * Club domestic league appearances and goals

Guðlaugur "Pétur" Pétursson (born 27 June 1959 in Akranes) is a retired Icelandic footballer who played as a forward.

== Club career ==
Pétur made his professional debut at ÍA and also played for Feyenoord Rotterdam, RSC Anderlecht (35), Royal Antwerp FC, Hércules CF, KR and Tindastóll.

== International career ==
Pétur played 41 caps for Iceland, scoring 11 goals. He played his last international match in September 1990 against France.

== Honours ==
- 1977 : Úrvalsdeild winner with ÍA
- 1978 : Icelandic Cup winner with ÍA
- 1979–80 : KNVB Cup winner with Feyenoord
- 1986 : Icelandic Cup winner with ÍA
