= Ivo Knoflíček =

Czech footballer and coach

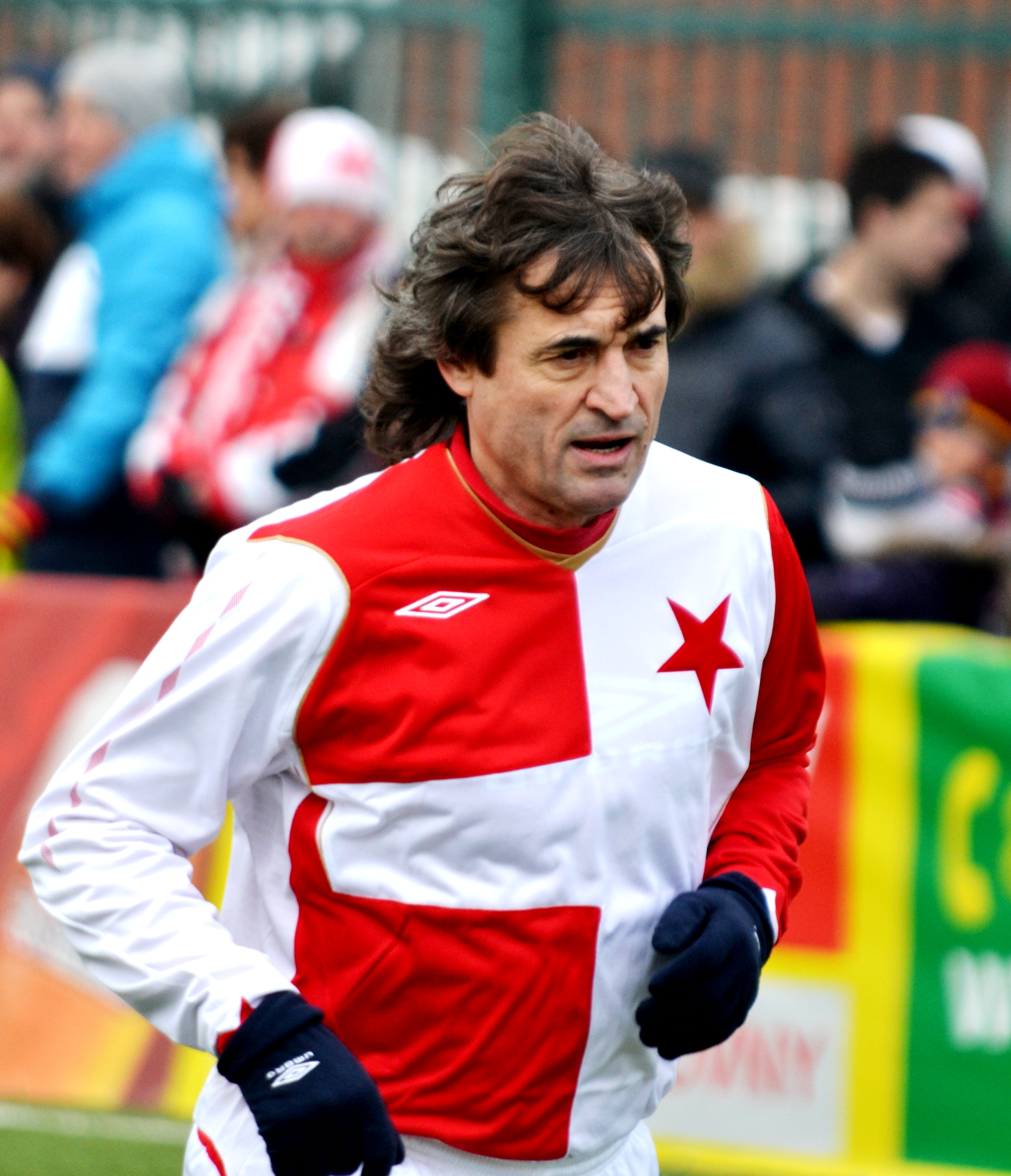
- Knoflíček in 2013

Personal information
- Date of birth: 23 February 1962 (age 64)
- Place of birth: Kyjov, Czechoslovakia
- Height: 1.80 m (5 ft 11 in)
- Position: Striker

Youth career
- 1970–1974: TJ Baník Šardice
- 1974–1980: Zbrojovka Brno
- 1980–1981: SK Sigma Olomouc

Senior career*
Years	Team	Apps	(Gls)
1981–1982	Slavia Prague	26	(2)
1982–1984	RH Cheb	52	(8)
1984–1988	Slavia Prague	101	(46)
1989–1991	FC St. Pauli		
1991–1992	VfL Bochum	35	(5)
1992–1993	SK Vorwärts Steyr	10	(1)
1993	FK Švarc Benešov	22	(2)
1994–1995	Slavia Prague		
1995–1996	FC Pares Prušánky	38	(6)
1996–1998	1. FK Příbram		

International career
1983–1992	Czechoslovakia	38	(7)

Managerial career
- 2006: FC Vlašim
- * Club domestic league appearances and goals

Ivo Knoflíček (born 23 February 1962) is a former Czech football coach and player. He played for the Czechoslovakia national team, making 38 appearances and scoring seven goals. At club level, Knoflíček played mostly for Slavia Prague. Knoflíček played a total of 50 matches in the Czech First League, scoring seven goals.

== Biography ==
Knoflíček grew up in Šardice in Hodonín District and also holds a Bolivian passport. In 1988, he and compatriot Luboš Kubík defected to England from a training camp in West Germany. In January 1989, they attempted to sign for Derby County as free agents and were presented as new signings by the club's then-owner, the Czechoslovak-born Robert Maxwell, during a match against Southampton. However, both players were still under contract with Slavia Prague, who refused to allow the players to transfer. The following year, Knoflíček transferred to FC St. Pauli, making his league debut in a 2–1 victory against Borussia Mönchengladbach with a goal in the 88th minute.

At international level, he participated at the 1990 FIFA World Cup. His final appearance was a friendly match against Austria in August 1992.
