= Igor Belanov =

Ukrainian footballer (born 1960)

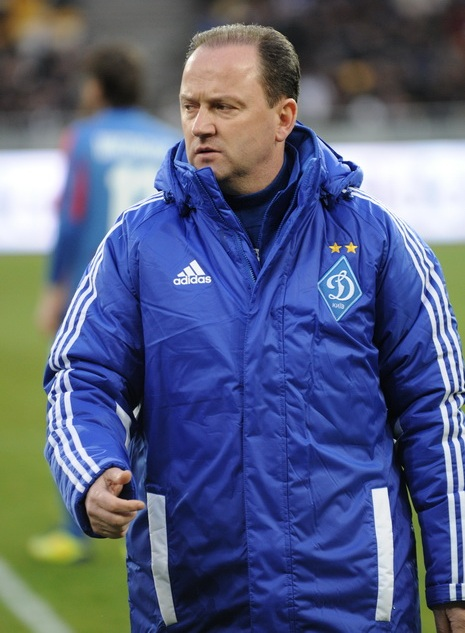
- Belanov in 2012

Personal information
- Full name: Igor Ivanovich Belanov
- Date of birth: 25 September 1960 (age 66)
- Place of birth: Odesa, Ukrainian SSR, Soviet Union
- Height: 1.74 m (5 ft 9 in)
- Position: Striker

Youth career
- 1973–1978: Chornomorets Odesa

Senior career*
Years	Team	Apps	(Gls)
1979–1981	SKA Odesa	68	(16)
1981–1985	Chornomorets Odesa	116	(26)
1985–1989	Dynamo Kyiv	121	(40)
1989–1991	Borussia Mönchengladbach	24	(4)
1991–1995	Eintracht Braunschweig	64	(21)
1995–1996	Chornomorets Odesa	3	(1)
1996–1997	Metalurh Mariupol	5	(4)
Total		401	(112)

International career
1983	USSR (Olympic)	2	(0)
1985–1990	USSR	33	(8)
Medal record
Representing Soviet Union
UEFA European Championship
Runner-up	1988 West Germany
- * Club domestic league appearances and goals

Igor Ivanovich Belanov (Russian: И́горь Ива́нович Бела́нов) or Ihor Ivanovych Bielanov (Ukrainian: Ігор Іванович Бєланов; born 25 September 1960) is a Soviet and Ukrainian former professional footballer who played as a striker.

He made a name for himself at Dynamo Kyiv, winning five major titles as well as the Ballon d'Or in 1986 and became the second Ukrainian national to win the award after Oleh Blokhin (1975). He then spent six years in Germany with Borussia Mönchengladbach in the Bundesliga and Eintracht Braunschweig in the 2. Bundesliga, with little success.

Belanov represented the Soviet Union at one World Cup and one European Championship. He was included in the list of the top 100 World Cup footballers of all time by The Guardian in 2014. In 2011, he, Oleh Blokhin and Vitaliy Starukhin were named as the "legends of Ukrainian football" at the Victory of Football awards.

== Club career ==
=== Beginnings and Dynamo Kyiv ===
Belanov was born in Odesa, Ukraine, Soviet Union. He started playing professionally in his hometown, with SKA Odesa and FC Chornomorets Odesa, joining country giants FC Dynamo Kyiv in 1985, and scoring ten goals in his first season, which ended with league and cup conquest.

Along with teammates Oleh Blokhin and Oleksandr Zavarov, Belanov led the scoring charts at the 1985–86 UEFA Cup Winners' Cup (five apiece) as Dynamo won the competition for the second time. He played the full 90 minutes in the final against Atlético Madrid (3–0).

=== Germany ===
Midway through 1989, 29-year-old Belanov got the long-awaited clearance to join a Western European side, making a move to Germany to join Borussia Mönchengladbach. He joined for a transfer fee of 2 million Deutsche Mark but did not move until October due to wanting to conclude the Soviet season; he was then sidelined by muscle fibre injury. His debut in the Bundesliga came on 4 November 1989 in a 4–0 away defeat against VfB Stuttgart, but he failed to impress overall, scoring only five goals in his one-and-a-half-season stint.

Belanov's reputation at the club diminished further in January 1990, when he and his wife were among five Soviet citizens arrested for shoplifting clothes worth 2,000 DM. Belanov protested that he was innocent, and was found guilty, being fined 24,000 DM. He had faced financial problems due to his demand to be paid in U.S. dollars, which he trusted more than the mark, but which had suddenly declined in value.

Belanov moved to 2. Bundesliga's Eintracht Braunschweig in January 1991, for a fee of 450,000 DM. He made his debut for his new club on 23 February, and went on to net 21 times in the competition in three seasons combined, also suffering relegation in 1992–93 without making a single appearance.

=== Retirement ===
In 1995 Belanov returned home to Chernomorets for one season, retiring at almost 37 after a spell with FC Illychivets Mariupol, appearing in only five games in two seasons combined.

== International career ==
In 1983, Belanov was invited to the USSR Olympic team, for which he played two official matches and two more friendly matches, in which he scored one goal.

In the period 1985–1990 Belanov played 33 matches for the USSR national team, scoring eight goals. His best performance came at the 1986 FIFA World Cup in Mexico, where he netted four and assisted for six others as the team (which comprised 13 Dynamo Kyiv players) reached the round-of-16; he scored a hat-trick in the game against Belgium, in a losing extra time effort (3–4).

This performance at the World Cup, along with Dynamo's Cup Winners' Cup success, helped Belanov win the European Footballer of the Year award. He was also part of the squad that reached the final of UEFA Euro 1988, where the national side faced the Netherlands. With the score at 2–0 for the Netherlands, USSR were awarded a penalty: he took it, but saw goalkeeper Hans van Breukelen save his effort as the score remained 2–0 until full time, giving the Netherlands the European title. He won 33 caps between 1985 and 1990.

== Style of play ==
Belanov was noted for his athleticism, in particular for his running speed and powerful goal strikes. He was one of the fastest sprinters among Soviet footballers of all times, together with Oleh Blokhin. However, while Blokhin was trained by his parents, who were both competitive sprinters, Belanov never received a formal sprint training; yet he ran the 50 metres in a hand-timed 5.7 seconds, corresponding to a mere 0.3 seconds slower than the world record at the time.

== Post-retirement ==
=== Majority shareholder at Switzerland's FC Wil ===
Belanov turned to business after finishing his playing career. He returned to prominence when he became the majority shareholder at Switzerland's FC Wil, in August 2003. His predecessor, banker Andreas Hafen, had been given a five-year prison sentence after embezzling 51 million Swiss francs ($40 million) from the UBS Bank.

Belanov's first move at Wil was replacing first-team manager Martin Andermatt with his former Dynamo Kyiv teammate Oleksandr Zavarov, not taking note of the fact that he lacked the necessary UEFA licence to manage a European top-division outfit. That circumstance forced Belanov to sign former FC Karl-Marx-Stadt manager Joachim Müller. Due to the appointment of Müller, Zavarov's job was officially described as director of football; Müller did not last long as coach however, as Belanov sacked him just after three months, replacing him with Tomáš Matějček.

Matejcek's strict training regiment caused a quick revolt amongst Wil players. This forced Belanov to make amends for his decisions and to re-appoint Müller as manager, and hand the assistant-manager role to former Swiss international goalkeeper Stephan Lehmann. Those turned out to be Belanov's last series of actions as Wil's major shareholder as, in a quick sequence, he pulled out of his chairman and shareholder role of the club. Under his leadership, Wil won the Swiss Cup for the first time ever, and therefore participated in the UEFA Cup qualification in the following season.

=== Other activities ===
Additionally, Belanov also owned a football school in Odesa, Ukraine, which carried his name.

On 1 September 2012, the first twelve commemorative stars were laid on the Alley of Glory of the FC Chornomorets Odesa, one of which is dedicated to Belanov.

In 2018 he joined the board of strategic development Ukrainian Association of Football.

Following the Russian invasion of Ukraine 2022, Belanov joined the Territorial Defence Battalion of the Ukrainian Armed Forces of his hometown Odesa.

== Career statistics ==
=== Club ===
Appearances and goals by club, season and competition
Club	Season	League			Cup (Note: Includes USSR Cup and DFB-Pokal)		Europe		Other		Total	
Club	Season	Division	Apps	Goals	Apps	Goals	Apps	Goals	Apps	Goals	Apps	Goals
SKA Odesa	1979	Soviet First League	32	5	—		—		—		32	5
SKA Odesa	1980	Soviet First League	36	11	—		—		—		36	11
SKA Odesa	Total		68	16	0	0	0	0	0	0	68	16
Chornomorets Odesa	1981	Soviet Top League	27	6	2	0	—		—		29	6
Chornomorets Odesa	1982	Soviet Top League	29	2	4	1	—		—		33	3
Chornomorets Odesa	1983	Soviet Top League	27	7	1	0	—		—		28	7
Chornomorets Odesa	1984	Soviet Top League	33	11	5	3	—		—		38	14
Chornomorets Odesa	Total		116	26	12	4	0	0	0	0	128	30
Dynamo Kyiv	1985	Soviet Top League	31	10	4	2	4 (Note: Appearance in European Cup Winners' Cup)	1	—		39	13
Dynamo Kyiv	1986	Soviet Top League	22	10	1	0	8 (Note: Five appearances and four goals in European Cup Winners' Cup, three appearances in European Cup)	4	1 (Note: Appearance in Soviet Super Cup)	0	32	14
Dynamo Kyiv	1987	Soviet Top League	23	8	6	3	5 (Note: Appearance in European Cup)	1	3 (Note: One appearance in European Super Cup, one appearance and one goal in Soviet Super Cup, one appearance in USSR Federation Cup)	1	37	13
Dynamo Kyiv	1988	Soviet Top League	27	9	4	1	—		—		31	10
Dynamo Kyiv	1989	Soviet Top League	18	3	4	1	—		—		22	4
Dynamo Kyiv	Total		121	40	19	7	17	6	4	1	161	54
Borussia; Mönchengladbach	1989–90	Bundesliga	14	4	1	0	—		—		15	4
Borussia; Mönchengladbach	1990–91	Bundesliga	10	0	2	1	—		—		12	1
Borussia; Mönchengladbach	Total		24	4	3	1	0	0	0	0	27	5
Eintracht Braunschweig	1990–91	2. Bundesliga	9	3	—		—		—		9	3
Eintracht Braunschweig	1991–92	2. Bundesliga	29	10	1	1	—		—		30	11
Eintracht Braunschweig	1992–93	2. Bundesliga	0	0	0	0	—		—		0	0
Eintracht Braunschweig	1993–94	Oberliga Nord	26	8	1	0	—		4 (Note: Appearance in 2. Bundesliga promotion play-offs)	0	31	8
Eintracht Braunschweig	Total		64	21	2	1	0	0	4	0	70	22
Chornomorets Odesa	1995–96	Vyshcha Liha	3	1	—		—		—		3	1
Metalurh Mariupol	1995–96	Ukrainian Second League	1	0	—		—		—		1	0
Metalurh Mariupol	1996–97	Ukrainian First League	4	4	—		—		—		4	4
Metalurh Mariupol	Total		5	4	0	0	0	0	0	0	5	4
Career total			401	112	36	13	17	6	8	1	462	132

=== International ===
Appearances and goals by national team and year
National team	Year	Apps	Goals
Soviet Union	1985	3	0
Soviet Union	1986	8	6
Soviet Union	1987	7	2
Soviet Union	1988	13	0
Soviet Union	1989	1	0
Soviet Union	1990	1	0
Total		33	8

Scores and results list Soviet Union's goal tally first, score column indicates score after each Belanov goal.

List of international goals scored by Igor Belanov
No.	Date	Venue	Opponent	Score	Result	Competition
1	2 June 1986	Estadio Sergio León Chávez, Irapuato, Mexico	Hungary	3–0	6–0	1986 FIFA World Cup
2	15 June 1986	Estadio Nou Camp, León, Mexico	Belgium	1–0	3–4	1986 FIFA World Cup
3	15 June 1986	Estadio Nou Camp, León, Mexico	Belgium	2–1	3–4	1986 FIFA World Cup
4	15 June 1986	Estadio Nou Camp, León, Mexico	Belgium	3–4	3–4	1986 FIFA World Cup
5	11 October 1986	Parc des Princes, Paris, France	France	1–0	2–0	Euro 1988 qualifying
6	29 October 1986	Lokomotiv Stadium, Simferopol, Soviet Union	Norway	2–0	4–0	Euro 1988 qualifying
7	29 April 1987	Republican Stadium, Kyiv, Soviet Union	East Germany	2–0	2–0	Euro 1988 qualifying
8	28 October 1987	Lokomotiv Stadium, Simferopol, Soviet Union	Iceland	1–0	2–0	Euro 1988 qualifying

== Honours ==
Dynamo Kyiv

- UEFA Cup Winners' Cup: 1985–86
- Soviet League: 1985, 1986
- Soviet Cup: 1985, 1987, 1990
- Soviet Super Cup: 1986, 1987

Soviet Union

- UEFA European Championship runner-up: 1988

Individual

- Ballon d'Or: 1986
- UEFA Cup Winners' Cup top scorer: 1985–86
- Guerin Sportivo All-Star Team: 1986
- World Soccer Player of the Year runner-up: 1986
- FIFA World Cup Bronze Boot: 1986
- ADN Eastern European Footballer of the Season: 1986
- UEFA European Championship top assist provider: 1988
- The World Cup's top 100 footballers of all time, by The Guardian
- FourFourTwo The best strikers of the 80s 19th: 2023
- Merited Master of Sports: 1986
- The best 33 football players of the Soviet Union (4): 1985 — No. 3, 1986 — No. 1, 1987 — No. 3, 1988 — No. 3
- World XI: 1991, 1998
- Golden Foot: 2008, as a legend
