= Yannick Stopyra =

French footballer (born 1961)

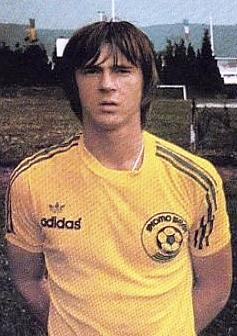
- Stopyra in 1978

Personal information
- Date of birth: 9 January 1961 (age 65)
- Place of birth: Troyes, France
- Height: 1.80 m (5 ft 11 in)
- Position: Striker

Youth career
- USSC Redon
- Sochaux

Senior career*
Years	Team	Apps	(Gls)
1977–1983	Sochaux	176	(57)
1983–1984	Rennes	37	(9)
1984–1988	Toulouse	147	(46)
1988–1989	Bordeaux	34	(8)
1989–1991	Cannes	37	(9)
1991–1992	Metz	24	(1)
1992–1994	Mulhouse	59	(22)
Total		514	(152)

International career
1980–1988	France	33	(11)
Medal record
Representing France
FIFA World Cup
Third place	1986 Mexico
CONMEBOL–UEFA Cup of Champions
Winner	1985 France
- * Club domestic league appearances and goals

Yannick Stopyra (born 9 January 1961) is a French former professional footballer who played as a striker.

He amassed Ligue 1 totals of 455 matches and 130 goals in representation of six teams, mainly Sochaux and Toulouse, in a 17-year senior career.

Stopyra appeared for France at the 1986 World Cup.

== Club career ==
Born in Troyes, Aube of Polish ancestry, Stopyra spent 15 of his 17 seasons as a professional in Ligue 1, representing FC Sochaux-Montbéliard, Stade Rennais FC, Toulouse FC, FC Girondins de Bordeaux, AS Cannes and FC Metz. He made his senior debut with the former at only 17, helping it to the second position in the domestic championship in 1979–80 and the semi-finals of the UEFA Cup the following campaign.

Stopyra retired in June 1994 at the age of 33, after two years in Ligue 2 with FC Mulhouse. He later returned to Bordeaux, going on to work with its youth sides.

== International career ==
Stopyra with France at the 1986 World Cup

Stopyra won his first cap for the France national team on 27 February 1980, in a friendly with Greece where he scored the final 5–1. He appeared in a further 32 internationals and netted 11 goals over eight years.

Stopyra was picked by manager Henri Michel for the squad that competed at the 1986 FIFA World Cup. He appeared in all the games but one in Mexico as Les Bleus finished in third position, scoring against Hungary in the group stage (3–0) and against Italy in the round of 16 (2–0).

=== International goals ===
#	Date	Venue	Opponent	Score	Result	Competition	Ref
1	27 February 1980	Parc des Princes, Paris, France	Greece	5–1	5–1	Friendly	
2	16 February 1983	Estádio Municipal, Guimarães, Portugal	Portugal	1–0	3–0	Friendly	
3	16 February 1983	Estádio Municipal, Guimarães, Portugal	Portugal	3–0	3–0	Friendly	
4	13 October 1984	Stade Municipal, Luxembourg City, Luxembourg	Luxembourg	3–0	4–0	1986 FIFA World Cup qualification	
5	13 October 1984	Stade Municipal, Luxembourg City, Luxembourg	Luxembourg	4–0	4–0	1986 FIFA World Cup qualification	
6	8 December 1984	Parc des Princes, Paris, France	East Germany	1–0	2–0	1986 FIFA World Cup qualification	
7	9 June 1986	Estadio León, León, Mexico	Hungary	1–0	3–0	1986 FIFA World Cup	
8	17 June 1986	Estadio Olímpico Universitario, Mexico City, Mexico	Italy	2–0	2–0	1986 FIFA World Cup	
9	29 April 1987	Parc des Princes, Paris, France	Iceland	2–0	2–0	UEFA Euro 1988 qualifying	
10	27 January 1988	Ramat Gan Stadium, Ramat Gan, Israel	Israel	1–0	1–1	Friendly	
11	5 February 1988	Stade Louis II, Monaco	Morocco	2–1	2–1	Friendly	

== Personal life ==
Stopyra's father, Julien (1933–2015), was also a forward. He earned one cap for France.

== Honours ==
France

- FIFA World Cup third place: 1986
- Artemio Franchi Cup: 1985
