= Per Edmund Mordt =

Norwegian footballer (born 1965)

Personal information
- Full name: Per Edmund Mordt
- Date of birth: 25 March 1965 (age 61)
- Place of birth: Arendal, Norway
- Position: Centre back

Senior career*
Years	Team	Apps	(Gls)
1983	Kolbotn IL	?	(?)
1984–1985	Vålerenga	44	(3)
1986–1993	IFK Göteborg	77	(4)
1994	SK Brann	6	(0)
1995	Drøbak-Frogn IL	12	(1)

International career
1984–1989	Norway	31	(1)
- * Club domestic league appearances and goals

Per Edmund Mordt (born 25 March 1965) is a retired Norwegian football defender and midfielder.

Mordt was born in Arendal. During his club career, Mordt played for Kolbotn IL, Vålerenga IF, IFK Göteborg, SK Brann and Drøbak-Frogn IL. In 1986, at only 21 years of age, Mordt missed the vital penalty kick in the 1985–86 European Cup semi final after coming on as a substitute against FC Barcelona, resulting in the Catalans progressing to the final stage of the tournament at the expense of IFK Göteborg. He also amassed 31 caps for the Norwegian national team, scoring 1 goal.
