= Carmelo Micciche =

French footballer (born 1963)

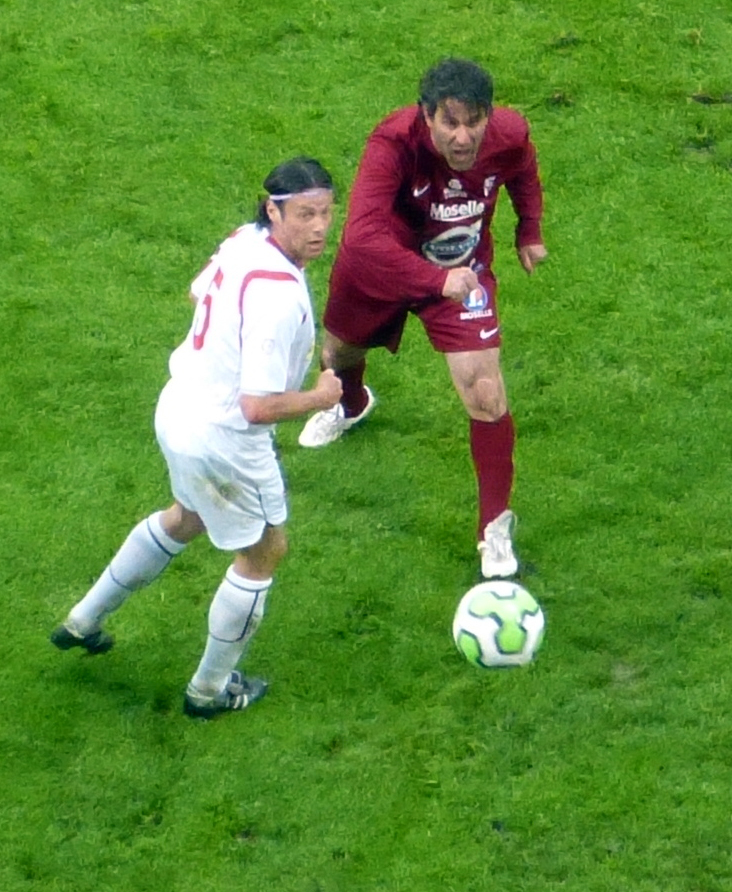

Personal information
- Date of birth: 16 August 1963 (age 63)
- Place of birth: Uckange, France
- Height: 1.77 m (5 ft 10 in)
- Position: Striker

Senior career*
Years	Team	Apps	(Gls)
1984–1989	Metz	172	(40)
1989–1990	Olympique Marseille	4	(0)
1990–1991	Cannes		
1991–1993	Nancy	21	(3)
1993–1996	Hapoel Petah Tikva	77	(13)
1996–1997	Rodange 91		
1997–2004	Forbach		
2004–2005	Bleid		

International career
1987	France	2	(1)

Managerial career
- 2001–2003: Forbach
- * Club domestic league appearances and goals

Carmelo Micciche (born 16 August 1963) is a French former professional footballer who played as a striker.

== Club career ==
Born in Lorraine to Sicilian parents, he played for local clubs Metz and Nancy.
