= Philippe Fargeon =

French footballer (born 1964)

Personal information
- Date of birth: 24 June 1964 (age 62)
- Place of birth: Ambilly, France
- Position: Forward

Senior career*
Years	Team	Apps	(Gls)
1984–1985	Auxerre	16	(0)
1985–1986	Bellinzona	42	(34)
1986–1988	Bordeaux	54	(28)
1988	Toulon	16	(4)
1988–1990	Servette	33	(11)
1990–1992	Bordeaux	43	(4)
1992–1993	Chiasso	19	(3)
Total		223	(84)

International career
1987–1988	France	7	(2)
- * Club domestic league appearances and goals

Philippe Fargeon (born 24 June 1964) is a French former professional footballer who played as a forward.
