= Vagiz Khidiyatullin =

Russian footballer

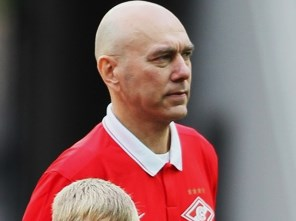

Personal information
- Full name: Vagiz Nazirovich Khidiyatullin
- Date of birth: 3 March 1959 (age 67)
- Place of birth: Gubakha, Soviet Union
- Height: 1.82 m (6 ft 0 in)
- Position: Defender

Senior career*
Years	Team	Apps	(Gls)
1976–1980	Spartak Moscow	118	(14)
1981–1983	CSKA Moscow	35	(2)
1984–1985	SKA Karpaty Lviv	9	(0)
1986–1988	Spartak Moscow	57	(8)
1988–1990	Toulouse FC	58	(1)
1990–1993	Montauban FCTG	?	(?)
1993–1994	Labège FC	?	(?)
1994	FC Dynamo Moscow	15	(1)

International career
1978–1990	USSR	58	(6)
- * Club domestic league appearances and goals

Olympic medal record

Men's Football
Bronze medal – third place	1980 Moscow	Team

Vagiz Nazirovich Khidiyatullin (Russian: Вагиз Назирович Хидиятуллин; Tatar: Вагыйзь Назир улы Һидиятуллин; born 3 March 1959 in Gubakha, Perm Oblast, Russian SFSR) is a former footballer who played as central defender.

He earned 58 caps and scored 6 goals for the Soviet Union national football team, and played for them in the 1980 Summer Olympics, 1988 UEFA European Championship and the 1990 FIFA World Cup (also included in the 1982 FIFA World Cup squad, but did not play). He was the founder and President of Russian Professional Players Trade Union and is of Tatar origin.

== Honours ==
- Soviet Top League (all with Spartak Moscow)

- Champion (2): 1979, 1987
- Runner-up, silver (1): 1980
- Runner-up, bronze (1): 1986

Russian Premier League

- Runner-up, silver (1): 1994 with Dynamo Moscow

- Russian Cup

- Winner (1): 1994 with Dynamo Moscow

- 1980 Summer Olympics

- Runner-up, bronze (1): 1980

- Euro 1988

- Runner-up, silver (1): 1988

- U20 FIFA World Cup

- Champion (1): 1977

- U19 UEFA Championship

- Champion, (1): 1976
