= Romania national football team results (1980–1999) =

Win Draw Loss

This is a list of the Romania national football team results from 1980 to 1999.

== 1980 ==
11 January 1980 TO 1980	Hungary	2–2	Romania	Bogotá, Colombia
	László 55'; Judik 85'	Report	Dinu 68', 77'	Stadium: Estadio Nemesio Camacho; Attendance: 6,000; Referee: Guillermo Velásquez (Colombia)

16 February 1980 Friendly	Italy	2–1	Romania	Naples, Italy
	Collovati 56'; Causio 87'	Report	Bölöni 52'	Stadium: Stadio San Paolo; Attendance: 42,007; Referee: Charles Corver (Netherlands)

30 March 1980 1977-80 BC	Yugoslavia	2–0	Romania	Belgrade, Yugoslavia
	Krstičević 35'; Sušić 61'	Report		Stadium: Omladinski Stadium; Attendance: 7,000; Referee: Nihat Özbirgül (Turkey)

2 April 1980 Friendly	Romania	2–2	East Germany	Bucharest, Romania
	Sandu 31'; Dörner 60' (o.g.)	Report	Streich 78'; Schmuck 89'	Stadium: Stadionul 23 August; Attendance: 20,000; Referee: Spas Lukov (Bulgaria)

18 May 1980 Friendly	Czechoslovakia	2–1	Romania	Brno, Czechoslovakia
	Vízek 31', 60'	Report	Ionescu 51'	Stadium: Stadion za Lužánkami; Attendance: 8,000; Referee: Widukind Herrmann (East Germany)

6 June 1980 Friendly	Belgium	2–1	Romania	Brussels, Belgium
	Ceulemans 48'; Van der Elst 87'	Report	Cămătaru 24'	Stadium: Stade du Heysel; Attendance: 3,875; Referee: Jacob Baumann (Switzerland)

27 August 1980 1977-80 BC	Romania	4–1	Yugoslavia	Bucharest, Romania
	Iordănescu 21', 55' (pen.), 79' (pen.); Cămătaru 26'	Report	Sušić 73' (pen.)	Stadium: Stadionul 23 August; Attendance: 25,000; Referee: Antonis Vassaras (Greece)

10 September 1980 Friendly	Bulgaria	1–2	Romania	Varna, Bulgaria
	Slavkov 50'	Report	Beldeanu 34'; Iordănescu 71'	Stadium: Yuri Gagarin Stadium; Attendance: 15,000; Referee: Alojzy Jarguz (Poland)

24 September 1980 1982 WCQ	Norway	1–1	Romania	Oslo, Norway
	Hareide 23'	Report	Iordănescu 13'	Stadium: Ullevaal Stadion; Attendance: 22,350; Referee: Siegfried Kirschen (East Germany)

15 October 1980 1982 WCQ	Romania	2–1	England	Bucharest, Romania
	Răducanu 35'; Iordănescu 75' (pen.)	Report	Woodcock 64'	Stadium: Stadionul 23 August; Attendance: 75,000; Referee: Ulf Eriksson (Sweden)

== 1981 ==
25 March 1981 Friendly	Romania	2–0	Poland	Bucharest, Romania
	Cămătaru 8'; Iordănescu 30'	Report		Stadium: Stadionul 23 August; Attendance: 35,000; Referee: Ahmed Yasharov (Bulgaria)

8 April 1981 Friendly	Israel	2–1	Romania	Tel Aviv, Israel
	Sinai 3'; Mizrahi 89'	Report	Sandu 4'	Stadium: Bloomfield Stadium; Attendance: 3,000; Referee: Yair Tilingher (Israel)

15 April 1981 Friendly	Denmark	2–1	Romania	Copenhagen, Denmark
	Simonsen 50' (pen.); Bastrup 80'	Report	Cămătaru 46'	Stadium: Københavns Idrætspark; Attendance: 11,500; Referee: Rolf Ericsson (Sweden)

19 April 1981 1982 WCQ	England	0–0	Romania	London, England
		Report		Stadium: British Empire Exhibition Stadium; Attendance: 62,500; Referee: Heinz Aldinger (West Germany)

13 May 1981 1982 WCQ	Hungary	1–0	Romania	Budapest, Hungary
	László 18'	Report		Stadium: Népstadion; Attendance: 60,000; Referee: Alexis Ponnet (Belgium)

3 June 1981 1982 WCQ	Romania	1–0	Norway	Bucharest, Romania
	Ţicleanu 67'	Report		Stadium: Stadionul 23 August; Attendance: 65,000; Referee: Erkan Göksel (Turkey)

9 September 1981 Friendly	Romania	1–2	Bulgaria	Bucharest, Romania
	Balaci 43' (pen.)	Report	Yonchev 58'; Kostadinov 73'	Stadium: Stadionul 23 August; Attendance: 40,000; Referee: Vasilis Vourakis (Greece)

23 September 1981 1982 WCQ	Romania	0–0	Hungary	Bucharest, Romania
		Report		Stadium: Stadionul 23 August; Attendance: 70,000; Referee: Erich Linemayr (Austria)

10 October 1981 1982 WCQ	Romania	1–2	Switzerland	Bucharest, Romania
	Balaci 56'	Report	Zappa 69'; Lüthi 76'	Stadium: Stadionul 23 August; Attendance: 55,000; Referee: Enzo Barbaresco (Italy)

11 November 1981 1982 WCQ	Switzerland	0–0	Romania	Bern, Switzerland
		Report		Stadium: Wankdorfstadion; Attendance: 27,112; Referee: César Correia (Portugal)

== 1982 ==
24 March 1982 Friendly	Belgium	4–1	Romania	Brussels, Belgium
	Verheyen 11', 35'; Czerniatynski 67', 75'	Report	Ţicleanu 51'	Stadium: Stade du Heysel; Attendance: 7,330; Referee: Daniel Lambert (France)

14 April 1982 Friendly	Bulgaria	1–2	Romania	Ruse, Bulgaria
	Lahchiev 34'	Report	Cămătaru 44'; Bölöni 73'	Stadium: Gradski Stadion; Attendance: 25,000; Referee: Panayiotis Tsolakidis (Greece)

1 May 1982 Euro 1984 Q	Romania	3–1	Cyprus	Hunedoara, Romania
	Văetuş 16'; Cămătaru 19'; Bölöni 71'	Report	Vrahimis 16'	Stadium: Stadionul Corvinul; Attendance: 15,000; Referee: Arsen Hoxha (Albania)

12 May 1982 Friendly	Argentina	1–0	Romania	Rosario, Argentina
	Díaz 56'	Report		Stadium: Estadio Gigante de Arroyito; Attendance: 40,000; Referee: Claudio Busca (Argentina)

16 May 1982 Friendly	Peru	2–0	Romania	Lima, Peru
	Uribe 44' (pen.); Velásquez 89'	Report		Stadium: Estadio Nacional; Attendance: 22,000; Referee: Sergio Leinblieger (Peru)

18 May 1982 Friendly	Chile	2–3	Romania	Ñuñoa, Chile
	Bigorra 55'; Caszely 62'	Report	Klein 8', 25'; Augustin 28'	Stadium: Estadio Nacional de Chile; Attendance: 28,000; Referee: Guillermo Budge (Chile)

15 July 1982 Friendly	Romania	4–0	Japan	Suceava, Romania
	Klein 22'; Turcu 24'; Bölöni 52'; Georgescu 80'	Report		Stadium: Stadionul Areni; Attendance: 55,000; Referee: Panayiotis Tsolakidis (Greece)

18 July 1982 Friendly	Romania	3–1	Japan	Bucharest, Romania
	Bölöni 42'; Dudu Georgescu 70', 83'	Report	Totsuka 12'	Stadium: Stadionul 23 August; Attendance: 25,000; Referee: Panayiotis Tsolakidis (Greece)

1 September 1982 Friendly	Romania	1–0	Denmark	Bucharest, Romania
	Balaci 7'	Report		Stadium: Stadionul 23 August; Attendance: 45,000; Referee: Cumhur Demir (Turkey)

8 September 1982 Euro 1984 Q	Romania	2–0	Sweden	Bucharest, Romania
	Andone 25'; Klein 47'	Report		Stadium: Stadionul 23 August; Attendance: 50,000; Referee: Egon Šoštarić (Yugoslavia)

12 October 1982 Friendly	Romania	2–1	Bulgaria	Bucharest, Romania
		Report	61' Nikola Velkov	Stadium: Stadionul 23 August; Attendance: 60,000; Referee: Dan Petrescu (Romania)

17 November 1982 Friendly	East Germany	4–1	Romania	Chemnitz, East Germany
	Kühn 30', 65'; Schnuphase 40'; Heun 85'	Report	Bölöni 61'	Stadium: Ernst Thälmann Stadion; Attendance: 10,000; Referee: Romualdas Yushka (Soviet Union)

4 December 1982 Euro 1984 Q	Italy	0–0	Romania	Florence, Italy
		Report		Stadium: Stadio Comunale; Attendance: 50,478; Referee: Georges Konrath (France)

== 1983 ==
29 January 1983 Friendly	Turkey	1–1	Romania	Istanbul, Turkey
	Yula 33' (pen.)	Report	Gabor 9'	Stadium: Ali Sami Yen Stadı; Attendance: 7,748; Referee: Nedyalko Tahtadzhiev (Bulgaria)

2 February 1983 Friendly	Greece	1–3	Romania	Larissa, Greece
	Kousoulakis 16'	Report	Bölöni 10'; Cămătaru 24', 46'	Stadium: Alkazar Stadium; Attendance: 16,000; Referee: Vaggelis Yiannagoudakis (Greece)

9 March 1983 Friendly	Romania	3–1	Turkey	Bucharest, Romania
	Balaci 7', 19' (pen.); Bölöni 87'	Report	Çetiner 36'	Stadium: Stadionul 23 August; Attendance: 17,000; Referee: Bernd Stumpf (East Germany)

30 March 1983 Friendly	Romania	0–2	Yugoslavia	Timișoara, Romania
		Report	Džeko 14'; Trifunović 86'	Stadium: Stadionul 1 Mai; Attendance: 25,000; Referee: Matevos Mkrtchian (Soviet Union)

16 April 1983 Euro 1984 Q	Romania	1–0	Italy	Bucharest, Romania
	Bölöni 24'	Report		Stadium: Stadionul 23 August; Attendance: 80,000; Referee: Michel Vautrot (France)

15 May 1983 Euro 1984 Q	Romania	0–1	Czechoslovakia	Bucharest, Romania
		Report	Vízek 40' (pen.)	Stadium: Stadionul 23 August; Attendance: 50,000; Referee: Alexis Ponnet (Belgium)

1 June 1983 Friendly	Yugoslavia	1–0	Romania	Sarajevo, Yugoslavia
	Munteanu 59' (o.g.)	Report		Stadium: Stadion Koševo; Attendance: 15,000; Referee: Siegfried Kirschen (East Germany)

9 June 1983 Euro 1984 Q	Sweden	0–1	Romania	Solna, Sweden
		Report	Cămătaru 29'	Stadium: Råsunda Fotbollstadion; Attendance: 29,522; Referee: Adolf Prokop (East Germany)

10 August 1983 Friendly	Norway	0–0	Romania	Oslo, Norway
		Report		Stadium: Ullevaal Stadion; Attendance: 8,533; Referee: Ulf Eriksson (Sweden)

24 August 1983 Friendly	Romania	1–0	East Germany	Bucharest, Romania
	Negrilă 33'	Report		Stadium: Stadionul Steaua; Attendance: 10,000; Referee: Nicolae Negrilă (Bulgaria)

7 September 1983 Friendly	Poland	2–2	Romania	Kraków, Poland
	Ciołek 52'; Iwan 57' (pen.)	Report	Movilă 17'; Irimescu 79'	Stadium: Stadion Wisły; Attendance: 8,000; Referee: Jaromír Fausek (Czechoslovakia)

12 October 1983 Friendly	Wales	5–0	Romania	Wrexham, Wales
	Rush 14', 30'; Thomas 25'; James 72'; Curtis 90'	Report		Stadium: The Racecourse; Attendance: 4,161; Referee: Robert Wutz (France)

8 November 1983 Friendly	Israel	1–1	Romania	Tel Aviv, Israel
	Malmilian 49'	Report	Coraş 75'	Stadium: Bloomfield Stadium; Attendance: 4,500; Referee: Jacob Baumann (Switzerland)

12 November 1983 Euro 1984 Q	Cyprus	0–1	Romania	Limassol, Cyprus
		Report	Bölöni 78'	Stadium: Tsirion Athletic Center; Attendance: 13,000; Referee: Ronald Bridges (Wales)

30 November 1983 Euro 1984 Q	Czechoslovakia	1–1	Romania	Bratislava, Czechoslovakia
	Luhový 85'	Report	Geolgău 62'	Stadium: Tehelné pole Attendance: 48,000; Referee: Palotai Károly (Hungary)

== 1984 ==
22 January 1984 IGT 1984	Ecuador	1–3	Romania	Guayaquil, Ecuador
	Valencia 71'	Report	Bölöni 52'; Iorgulescu 61'; Cămătaru 63'	Stadium: Estadio Modelo Alberto Spencer; Attendance: 15,000; Referee: Nelson Ruales (Ecuador)

7 February 1984 Friendly	Algeria	1–1	Romania	Algiers, Algeria
	Chikh 80'	Report	Guendouz 73' (o.g.)	Stadium: Stade 5 Juillet 1962; Attendance: 15,000; Referee: Mohamed Tighilt (Algeria)

7 March 1984 Friendly	Romania	2–0	Greece	Craiova, Romania
	Coraş 17'; Mateuţ 61'	Report		Stadium: Stadionul Central; Attendance: 15,000; Referee: Menahem Ashkenazi (Israel)

11 April 1984 Friendly	Romania	0–0	Israel	Oradea, Romania
		Report		Stadium: Stadionul Municipal (Oradea); Attendance: 25,000; Referee: Bogdan Dochev (Bulgaria)

14 June 1984 Euro 1984	Romania	1–1	Spain	Saint-Étienne, France
	Bölöni 35'	Report	Carrasco 22' (pen.)	Stadium: Stade Geoffroy Guichard; Attendance: 17,012; Referee: Alexis Ponnet (Belgium)

17 June 1984 Euro 1984	West Germany	2–1	Romania	Lens, France
	Völler 26', 66'	Report	Coraş 46'	Stadium: Stade Félix Bollaert; Attendance: 31,803; Referee: Jan Keizer (Netherlands)

20 June 1984 Euro 1984	Portugal	1–0	Romania	Nantes, France
	Nené 81'	Report		Stadium: Stade de la Beaujoire; Attendance: 24,266; Referee: Heinz Fahnler (Austria)

29 July 1984 Friendly	Romania	4–2	China	Iaşi, Romania
	Rednic 2'; Cămătaru 3'; Orac 40'; Balint 45'	Report	Dayu 80', 83'	Stadium: Stadionul 23 August; Attendance: 25,000; Referee: Vergiliu Antohi (Romania)

31 July 1984 Friendly	Romania	1–0	China	Buzău, Romania
	Balint 54'	Report		Stadium: Stadionul Municipal (Buzău); Attendance: 10,000; Referee: Cristian Teodorescu (Romania)

19 August 1984 Friendly	East Germany	2–1	Romania	Gera, East Germany
	Minge 18'; Liebers 90'	Report	Irimescu 4' (pen.)	Stadium: Stadion der Freundschaft; Attendance: 8,500; Referee: Vadim Zhuk (Soviet Union)

12 September 1984 1986 WCQ	Northern Ireland	3–2	Romania	Belfast, Northern Ireland
	Iorgulescu 33' (o.g.); Whiteside 62'; Neill 74'	Report	Hagi 36'; Geolgău 80'	Stadium: Windsor Park; Attendance: 17,269; Referee: Alexis Ponnet (Belgium)

21 November 1984 Friendly	Israel	1–1	Romania	Petah Tikva, Israel
	Ohana 33'	Report	Lăcătuş 74'	Stadium: Municipal Stadium; Attendance: 2,000; Referee: Itzhak Ben Itzhak (Israel)

== 1985 ==
30 January 1985 Friendly	Portugal	2–3	Romania	Lisbon, Portugal
	Paulo 9'; Manuel 47'	Report	Lăcătuş 57', 77'; Hagi 84'	Stadium: Estádio José Alvalade; Attendance: 3,000; Referee: Emilio Soriano (Spain)

27 March 1985 Friendly	Romania	0–0	Poland	Sibiu, Romania
		Report		Stadium: Stadionul Municipal; Attendance: 25,000; Referee: Borislav Aleksandrov (Bulgaria)

3 April 1985 1986 WCQ	Romania	3–0	Turkey	Craiova, Romania
	Hagi 21'; Cămătaru 28', 42'	Report		Stadium: Stadionul Central; Attendance: 30,000; Referee: Itzhak Ben Itzhak (Israel)

1 May 1985 1986 WCQ	Romania	0–0	England	Bucharest, Romania
		Report		Stadium: Stadionul 23 August; Attendance: 60,000; Referee: Emilio Guruceta Muro (Spain)

6 June 1985 1986 WCQ	Finland	1–1	Romania	Helsinki, Finland
	Lipponen 26'	Report	Hagi 7'	Stadium: Helsingin Olympiastadion; Attendance: 24,863; Referee: Marcel Van Langenhove (Belgium)

7 August 1985 Friendly	Soviet Union	2–0	Romania	Moscow, Soviet Union
	Protasov 47'; Cherenkov 75'	Report		Stadium: Lenin Central Stadium; Attendance: 25,000; Referee: Aleksander Suchanek (Poland)

28 August 1985 1986 WCQ	Romania	2–0	Finland	Timișoara, Romania
	Hagi 6'; Mateuţ 56'	Report		Stadium: Stadionul 1 Mai; Attendance: 35,000; Referee: Zoran Petrović (Yugoslavia)

11 September 1985 1986 WCQ	England	1–1	Romania	London, England
	Hoddle 25'	Report	Cămătaru 60'	Stadium: British Empire Exhibition Stadium; Attendance: 59,500; Referee: Karl-Heinz Tritschler (West Germany)

16 October 1985 1986 WCQ	Romania	0–1	Northern Ireland	Bucharest, Romania
		Report	Quinn 29'	Stadium: Stadionul 23 August; Attendance: 45,000; Referee: Henning Lund Sørensen (Denmark)

13 November 1985 1986 WCQ	Turkey	1–3	Romania	İzmir, Turkey
	Tekin 78'	Report	Iorgulescu 15'; Coraş 28'; Iovan 54'	Stadium: İzmir Atatürk Stadyumu; Attendance: 19,477; Referee: Volker Roth (West Germany)

== 1986 ==
28 February 1986 Friendly	Egypt	2–2	Romania	Alexandria, Egypt
	Taher 29'; El-Khateeb 62' (pen.)	Report	Coraş 2'; Iorgulescu 50' (pen.)	Stadium: Al-Iskandarīyah Stadium; Attendance: 15,000; Referee: Mohamed Hafez (Egypt)

2 March 1986 Friendly	Egypt	0–1	Romania	Alexandria, Egypt
		Report	Gabor 38'	Stadium: Al-Iskandarīyah Stadium; Attendance: 30,000; Referee: Ahmed Badawi (Egypt)

14 March 1986 Friendly	Iraq	1–1	Romania	Baghdad, Iraq
	Haris 24'	Report	Augustin 19'	Stadium: Al-Shaab Stadium; Attendance: 25,000; Referee: Abdul Latif Abdul Kader (Iraq)

17 March 1986 Friendly	Iraq	0–0	Romania	Baghdad, Iraq
		Report		Stadium: Al-Shaab Stadium; Attendance: 30,000; Referee: Abas Abdul Rahman (Iraq)

26 March 1986 Friendly	Scotland	3–0	Romania	Glasgow, Scotland
	Strachan 18'; Gough 27'; Aitken 80'	Report		Stadium: Hampden Park; Attendance: 53,589; Referee: Volker Roth (West Germany)

23 April 1986 Friendly	Romania	2–1	Soviet Union	Timișoara, Romania
	Hagi 13'; Cămătaru 80'	Report	Rodionov 67'	Stadium: Stadionul 1 Mai; Attendance: 25,000; Referee: Dragiša Komadinić (Yugoslavia)

4 June 1986 Friendly	Romania	3–1	Norway	Bucharest, Romania
	Piţurcă 20' (pen.), 36'; Mateuţ 90'	Report	Sundby 63' (pen.)	Stadium: Stadionul 23 August; Attendance: 20,000; Referee: Menahem Ashkenazi (Israel)

20 August 1986 Friendly	Norway	2–2	Romania	Oslo, Norway
	Økland 60', 66'	Report	Osvold 25' (o.g.); Hagi 35'	Stadium: Ullevaal Stadion; Attendance: 3,200; Referee: Bruno Galler (Switzerland)

10 September 1986 Euro 1988 Q	Romania	4–0	Austria	Bucharest, Romania
	Iovan 45', 64'; Lăcătuş 61'; Hagi 90'	Report		Stadium: Stadionul Steaua; Attendance: 13,611; Referee: Gérard Biguet (France)

8 October 1986 Friendly	Israel	2–4	Romania	Ramat Gan, Israel
	Malmilian 2'; Cohen 84'	Report	Piţurcă 35', 75'; Bölöni 55'; Cămătaru 60'	Stadium: Ramat Gan Stadium; Attendance: 3,500; Referee: Kostas Kapsos (Cyprus)

12 November 1986 Euro 1988 Q	Spain	1–0	Romania	Seville, Spain
	Míchel 58'	Report		Stadium: Estadio Benito Villamarín; Attendance: 41,884; Referee: Jan Keizer (Netherlands)

== 1987 ==
4 March 1987 Friendly	Turkey	1–3	Romania	Ankara, Turkey
	Çolak 90' (pen.)	Report	Belodedici 44'; Bölöni 62'; Çoban 72' (o.g.)	Stadium: 19 Mayıs Stadı; Attendance: 12,727; Referee: Dušan Colić (Yugoslavia)

11 March 1987 Friendly	Greece	1–1	Romania	Piraeus, Greece
	Saravakos 52'	Report	Hagi 84' (pen.)	Stadium: Georgios Karaiskakis Stadium; Attendance: 6,000; Referee: Makis Germanakos (Greece)

25 March 1987 Euro 1988 Q	Romania	5–1	Albania	Bucharest, Romania
	Piţurcă 2'; Bölöni 43'; Hagi 45' (pen.); Belodedici 54'; Bumbescu 69'	Report	Muça 35'	Stadium: Stadionul Steaua; Attendance: 6,500; Referee: José Rosa dos Santos (Portugal)

8 April 1987 Friendly	Romania	3–2	Israel	Brașov, Romania
	Câmpeanu 21'; Belodedici 38'; Kramer 83'	Report	Brailovsky 19'; Tikva 80'	Stadium: Stadionul Municipal; Attendance: 30,000; Referee: Makis Germanakos (Greece)

29 April 1987 Euro 1988 Q	Romania	3–1	Spain	Bucharest, Romania
	Piţurcă 38'; Mateuţ 43'; Ungureanu 45'	Report	Calderé 81'	Stadium: Stadionul Steaua; Attendance: 30,000; Referee: Alexis Ponnet (Belgium)

2 September 1987 Friendly	Poland	3–1	Romania	Bydgoszcz, Poland
	Leśniak 19', 35'; Rudy 28'	Report	Bölöni 80' (pen.)	Stadium: Stadion Zawiszy; Attendance: 15,000; Referee: Ivan Gregr (Czechoslovakia)

7 October 1987 Friendly	Romania	2–2	Greece	Bucharest, Romania
	Ţârlea 72'; Bölöni 75'	Report	Anastopoulos 31'; Xanthopoulos 66'	Stadium: Stadionul Steaua; Attendance: 10,000; Referee: Yaacov Scheiner (Israel)

28 October 1987 Euro 1988 Q	Albania	0–1	Romania	Vlorë, Albania
		Report	Klein 62'	Stadium: Stadiumi Flamurtari; Attendance: 15,000; Referee: Ignace van Swieten (Netherlands)

17 November 1987 Euro 1988 Q	Austria	0–0	Romania	Vienna, Austria
		Report		Stadium: Praterstadion; Attendance: 6,200; Referee: Rosario Lo Bello (Italy)

== 1988 ==
3 February 1988 ILT 1988	Israel	0–2	Romania	Haifa, Israel
		Report	Bölöni 15'; Ciucă 70'	Stadium: Kiryat Eliezer Stadium; Attendance: 5,000; Referee: Christiaan van der Leer (Netherlands)

6 February 1988 ILT 1988	Poland	2–2	Romania	Haifa, Israel
	Cisek 42', 85'	Report	Coraş 37'; Sabău 48'	Stadium: Kiryat Eliezer Stadium; Attendance: 3,000; Referee: Zvi Sharir (Israel) (Note: Itzhak Ben Itzhak replaced Zvi Sharir at half-time.)

23 March 1988 Friendly	Republic of Ireland	2–0	Romania	Dublin, Republic of Ireland
	Moran 31'; Kelly 89'	Report		Stadium: Lansdowne Road; Attendance: 15,000; Referee: John Martin (England)

30 March 1988 Friendly	East Germany	3–3	Romania	Halle, East Germany
	Ernst 11'; Zötzsche 38' (pen.); Steinmann 57'	Report	Bölöni 20'; Andone 78'; Geolgău 83'	Stadium: Kurt Wabbel Stadion; Attendance: 5,000; Referee: Jiří Stiegler (Czechoslovakia)

1 June 1988 Friendly	Netherlands	2–0	Romania	Amsterdam, Netherlands
	Bosman 3'; Kieft 53'	Report		Stadium: Olympisch Stadion; Attendance: 12,500; Referee: Jan Damgaard (Denmark)

20 September 1988 Friendly	Romania	3–0	Albania	Constanţa, Romania
	Belodedici 23'; Hagi 35'; Cămătaru 76'	Report		Stadium: Stadionul 1 Mai; Attendance: 4,000; Referee: Janusz Eksztajn (Poland)

19 October 1988 1990 WCQ	Bulgaria	1–3	Romania	Sofia, Bulgaria
	Kolev 32'	Report	Mateuţ 25'; Cămătaru 80', 88'	Stadium: Vasil Levski National Stadium; Attendance: 52,000; Referee: Michał Listkiewicz (Poland)

2 November 1988 1990 WCQ	Romania	3–0	Greece	Bucharest, Romania
	Mateuţ 26'; Hagi 40' (pen.); Sabău 84'	Report		Stadium: Stadionul Steaua; Attendance: 12,500; Referee: Hubert Forstinger (Austria)

23 November 1988 Friendly	Romania	3–0	Israel	Sibiu, Romania
	Cămătaru 23'; Mateuţ 31', 40'	Report		Stadium: Stadionul Municipal; Attendance: 9,000; Referee: Ignace van Swieten (Netherlands)

== 1989 ==
29 March 1989 Friendly	Romania	1–0	Italy	Sibiu, Romania
	Sabău 48'	Report		Stadium: Stadionul Municipal; Attendance: 20,000; Referee: Siegfried Kirschen (East Germany)

12 April 1989 Friendly	Poland	2–1	Romania	Warsaw, Poland
	Urban 40'; Tarasiewicz 59'	Report	Sabău 57'	Stadium: Stadion Wojska Polskiego; Attendance: 15,000; Referee: Ivan Gregr (Czechoslovakia)

26 April 1989 1990 WCQ	Greece	0–0	Romania	Marousi, Greece
		Report		Stadium: Olympic Stadium; Attendance: 15,000; Referee: Aron Schmidhuber (West Germany)

17 May 1989 1990 WCQ	Romania	1–0	Bulgaria	Bucharest, Romania
	Popescu 35'	Report		Stadium: Stadionul Steaua; Attendance: 15,000; Referee: Sergey Husainov (Soviet Union)

31 August 1989 Friendly	Portugal	0–0	Romania	Setúbal, Portugal
		Report		Stadium: Estádio do Bonfim; Attendance: 5,000; Referee: Joaquín Ramos Marcos (Spain)

5 September 1989 Friendly	Czechoslovakia	2–0	Romania	Nitra, Czechoslovakia
	Vlk 45'; Bílek 59'	Report		Stadium: Štadión pod Zoborom; Attendance: 4,150; Referee: Heinz Holzmann (Austria)

11 October 1989 1990 WCQ	Denmark	3–0	Romania	Copenhagen, Denmark
	Nielsen 4'; Laudrup 26'; Povlsen 84'	Report		Stadium: Københavns Idrætspark; Attendance: 45,400; Referee: Claude Bouillet (France)

15 November 1989 1990 WCQ	Romania	3–1	Denmark	Bucharest, Romania
	Balint 25', 60'; Sabău 37'	Report	Povlsen 6'	Stadium: Stadionul Steaua; Attendance: 28,000; Referee: Tullio Lanese (Italy)

== 1990 ==
4 February 1990 Friendly	Algeria	0–0	Romania	Algiers, Algeria
		Report		Stadium: Stade 5 Juillet 1962; Attendance: 40,000; Referee: Rashid Medjiba (Algeria)

28 March 1990 Friendly	Egypt	1–3	Romania	Cairo, Egypt
	El-Kass 31'	Report	Timofte 19'; Balint 23', 87'	Stadium: Cairo International Stadium; Attendance: 50,000; Referee: Theodoros Kefalas (Greece)

3 April 1990 Friendly	Switzerland	2–1	Romania	Lucerne, Switzerland
	Hermann 44'; Chassot 48'	Report	Hagi 25' (pen.)	Stadium: Stadion Allmend; Attendance: 3,500; Referee: Roman Steindl (Austria)

25 April 1990 Friendly	Israel	1–4	Romania	Haifa, Israel
	Aharoni 73'	Report	Balbul 6' (o.g.); Hagi 13' (pen.); Sabău 45'; Balint 87'	Stadium: Kiryat Eliezer Stadium; Attendance: 3,000; Referee: Yaacov Scheiner (Israel)

21 May 1990 Friendly	Romania	1–0	Egypt	Bucharest, Romania
	Cămătaru 19'	Report		Stadium: Stadionul 23 August; Attendance: 23,000; Referee: Wojciech Rudy (Poland)

26 May 1990 Friendly	Belgium	2–2	Romania	Brussels, Belgium
	Scifo 7' (pen.); Clijsters 29'	Report	Rednic 53'; Lăcătuş 64' (pen.)	Stadium: Heysel Stadium; Attendance: 31,625; Referee: Alain Delmer (France)

9 June 1990 1990 WC	Romania	2–0	Soviet Union	Bari, Italy
	Lăcătuş 42', 57' (pen.)	Report		Stadium: Stadio San Nicola; Attendance: 42,907; Referee: Juan Daniel Cardellino (Uruguay)

14 June 1990 1990 WC	Cameroon	2–1	Romania	Bari, Italy
	Milla 76', 86'	Report	Balint 88'	Stadium: Stadio San Nicola; Attendance: 37,681; Referee: Hernán Silva (Chile)

18 June 1990 1990 WC	Argentina	1–1	Romania	Naples, Italy
	Monzón 63'	Report	Balint 68'	Stadium: Stadio San Paolo; Attendance: 52,733; Referee: Carlos Silva Valente (Portugal)

25 June 1990 1990 WC	Republic of Ireland	0–0 (a.e.t.) (5–4 p)	Romania	Genoa, Italy
		Report		Stadium: Stadio Luigi Ferraris; Attendance: 31,818; Referee: José Roberto Wright (Brazil)
	Penalties
	Sheedy (penalty scored); Houghton (penalty scored); Townsend (penalty scored); Cascarino (penalty scored); O'Leary (penalty scored)		(penalty scored) Hagi; (penalty scored) Lupu; (penalty scored) Rotariu; (penalty scored) Lupescu; (penalty missed) Timofte

29 August 1990 Friendly	Soviet Union	1–2	Romania	Moscow, Soviet Union
	Mykhaylychenko 71'	Report	Lăcătuş 14' (pen.); Lupescu 64'	Stadium: Lenin Central Stadium; Attendance: 15,000; Referee: Michał Listkiewicz (Poland)

12 September 1990 Euro 1992 Q	Scotland	2–1	Romania	Glasgow, Scotland
	Robertson 38'; McCoist 76'	Report	Cămătaru 14'	Stadium: Hampden Park; Attendance: 12,081; Referee: Ildefonso Urízar Azpitarte (Spain)

26 September 1990 Friendly	Romania	2–1	Poland	Bucharest, Romania
	Lazăr 38'; Rotariu 72'	Report	Warzycha 80'	Stadium: Stadionul Steaua; Attendance: 4,500; Referee: Robert Matušík (Czechoslovakia)

17 October 1990 Euro 1992 Q	Romania	0–3	Bulgaria	Bucharest, Romania
		Report	Sirakov 28'; Todorov 48', 75'	Stadium: Stadionul Steaua; Attendance: 15,350; Referee: José Rosa dos Santos (Portugal)

5 December 1990 Euro 1992 Q	Romania	6–0	San Marino	Bucharest, Romania
	Sabău 1'; Mateuţ 18'; Răducioiu 43'; Lupescu 57'; Badea 77'; Petrescu 85'	Report		Stadium: Stadionul National; Attendance: 6,380; Referee: Manfred Roßner (Germany)

- Romania played the non-FIFA Basque Country team on 21 March 1990; this did not contribute to ranking points or individual cap totals.

== 1991 ==
27 March 1991 Euro 1992 Q	San Marino	1–3	Romania	Serravalle, San Marino
	Pasolini 30' (pen.)	Report	Hagi 16' (pen.); Răducioiu 44'; Matteoni 83' (o.g.)	Stadium: Stadio Olimpico; Attendance: 745; Referee: Roger Philippi (Luxembourg)

3 April 1991 Euro 1992 Q	Switzerland	0–0	Romania	Neuchâtel, Switzerland
		Report		Stadium: Stade de la Maladière; Attendance: 15,700; Referee: Gérard Biguet (France)

17 April 1991 Friendly	Spain	0–2	Romania	Cáceres, Spain
		Report	Timofte 46'; Balint 57'	Stadium: Estadio Príncipe Felipe; Attendance: 16,000; Referee: João Correira (Portugal)

23 May 1991 Friendly	Norway	1–0	Romania	Oslo, Norway
	Fjørtoft 27'	Report		Stadium: Ullevaal Stadion; Attendance: 4,379; Referee: Brian Hill (England)

28 August 1991 Friendly	Romania	0–2	United States	Braşov, Romania
		Report	Balboa 40'; Murray 58'	Stadium: Stadionul Municipal; Attendance: 5,000; Referee: Bernd Heynemann (Germany)

16 October 1991 Euro 1992 Q	Romania	1–0	Scotland	Bucharest, Romania
	Hagi 75' (pen.)	Report		Stadium: Stadionul Steaua; Attendance: 15,850; Referee: Aron Schmidhuber (Germany)

13 November 1991 Euro 1992 Q	Romania	1–0	Switzerland	Bucharest, Romania
	Mateuţ 71'	Report		Stadium: Stadionul Steaua; Attendance: 30,000; Referee: John Blankenstein (Netherlands)

20 November 1991 Euro 1992 Q	Bulgaria	1–1	Romania	Sofia, Bulgaria
	Sirakov 55'	Report	Popescu 30'	Stadium: Vasil Levski National Stadium; Attendance: 20,000; Referee: Peter Mikkelsen (Denmark)

21 December 1991 Friendly	Egypt	3–1	Romania	Cairo, Egypt
	Ramzy 35'; Hassan 75'; Hamid 80'	Report	Munteanu 73'	Stadium: Cairo International Stadium; Attendance: 20,000; Referee: Farouk El Mahlavi (Egypt)

24 December 1991 Friendly	Egypt	1–1	Romania	Port Said, Egypt
	Ramzy 36'	Report	Munteanu 23'	Stadium: Port Said Stadium; Attendance: 25,000; Referee: Neji Jouini (Tunisia)

== 1992 ==
12 February 1992 Friendly	Greece	1–0	Romania	Ioannina, Greece
	Tsalouchidis 49'	Report		Stadium: Zosimades Stadium; Attendance: 5,852; Referee: Vassilios Nikakis (Greece)

8 April 1992 Friendly	Romania	2–0	Latvia	Bucharest, Romania
	Badea 4'; Petrescu 52'	Report		Stadium: Stadionul Steaua; Attendance: 6,000; Referee: Marc Batta (France)

6 May 1992 1994 WCQ	Romania	7–0	Faroe Islands	Bucharest, Romania
	Balint 3', 39', 78'; Hagi 15'; Lăcătuş 28' (pen.); Lupescu 45'; Pană 56'	Report		Stadium: Stadionul Steaua; Attendance: 10,000; Referee: Vassilios Nikakis (Greece)

20 May 1992 1994 WCQ	Romania	5–1	Wales	Bucharest, Romania
	Hagi 5', 35'; Lupescu 7', 24'; Balint 32'	Report	Rush 52'	Stadium: Stadionul Steaua; Attendance: 23,000; Referee: Fabio Baldas (Italy)

26 August 1992 Friendly	Romania	2–0	Mexico	Bucharest, Romania
	Varga 45'; Dumitrescu 84'	Report		Stadium: Stadionul National; Attendance: 8,000; Referee: Arcangelo Pezzella (Italy)

14 October 1992 1994 WCQ	Belgium	1–0	Romania	Anderlecht, Belgium
	Smidts 25'	Report		Stadium: Constant Vanden Stock Stadium; Attendance: 20,000; Referee: Pierluigi Pairetto (Italy)

14 November 1992 1994 WCQ	Romania	1–1	Czechoslovakia	Bucharest, Romania
	Dumitrescu 48'	Report	Němeček 81' (pen.)	Stadium: Stadionul Steaua; Attendance: 28,000; Referee: Joe Worrall (England)

29 November 1992 1994 WCQ	Cyprus	1–4	Romania	Larnaca, Cyprus
	Pittas 41' (pen.)	Report	Popescu 4'; Răducioiu 37'; Hagi 78'; Hanganu 87'	Stadium: Antonis Papadopoulos Stadium; Attendance: 3,000; Referee: Neji Jouini (Tunisia)

== 1993 ==
31 January 1993 Friendly	Ecuador	3–0	Romania	Santiago de Guayaquil, Ecuador
	Hurtado 32'; Gavica 43'; Aviles 77'	Report		Stadium: Estadio Modelo Alberto Spencer; Attendance: 15,000; Referee: Medardo Martínez (Ecuador)

3 February 1993 Friendly	Peru	0–2	Romania	Lima, Peru
		Report	Hanganu 32'; Dumitrescu 70'	Stadium: Estadio Nacional; Attendance: 10,000; Referee: Fernando Chappell Merino (Peru)

7 February 1993 Friendly	United States	1–1	Romania	Santa Barbara, United States
	Kinnear 2'	Report	Dumitrescu 39'	Stadium: Harder Stadium; Attendance: 9,127; Referee: Arturo Angeles (United States)

10 February 1993 Friendly	Mexico	2–0	Romania	Monterrey, Mexico
	Galindo 34'; Cruz 55'	Report		Stadium: Estadio Tecnológico; Attendance: 40,000; Referee: Antonio Marrufo Mendoza (Mexico)

14 April 1993 1994 WCQ	Romania	2–1	Cyprus	Bucharest, Romania
	Dumitrescu 36', 56'	Report	Sotiriou 23'	Stadium: Stadionul Steaua; Attendance: 17,000; Referee: Alfred Wieser (Austria)

2 June 1993 1994 WCQ	Representation of Czechs and Slovaks (RCS)	5–2	Romania	Košice, Slovakia
	Vrabec 13'; Látal 38'; Dubovský 59', 83', 90'	Report	Răducioiu 26', 56'	Stadium: Všešportový areál Attendance: 15,000; Referee: Kim Milton Nielsen (Denmark)

8 September 1993 1994 WCQ	Faroe Islands	0–4	Romania	Toftir, Faroe Islands
		Report	Răducioiu 23', 58', 60', 76'	Stadium: Svangaskarð; Attendance: 2,724; Referee: Vadzim Zhuk (Belarus)

22 September 1993 Friendly	Romania	1–0	Israel	Bucharest, Romania
	Panduru 49'	Report		Stadium: Stadionul Steaua; Attendance: 4,000; Referee: Adrian Porumboiu (Romania)

13 October 1993 1994 WCQ	Romania	2–1	Belgium	Bucharest, Romania
	Răducioiu 67' (pen.); Dumitrescu 84'	Report	Scifo 88' (pen.)	Stadium: Stadionul Steaua; Attendance: 38,000; Referee: Puhl Sándor (Hungary)

17 November 1993 1994 WCQ	Wales	1–2	Romania	Cardiff, Wales
	Saunders 60'	Report	Hagi 33'; Răducioiu 83'	Stadium: Cardiff Arms Park; Attendance: 40,000; Referee: Kurt Röthlisberger (Switzerland)

== 1994 ==
13 February 1994 CLC 1994	United States	1–2	Romania	So Kon Po, Hong Kong
	Balboa 14'	Report	Dumitrescu 7', 82' (pen.)	Stadium: Hong Kong Stadium; Attendance: 6,000; Referee: Pang Cham Kai (Hong Kong)

16 February 1994 Friendly	South Korea	1–2	Romania	Changwon, South Korea
	Shin Hong-gi 19'	Report	Dumitrescu 44', 74'	Stadium: Changwon Civil Stadium; Attendance: 20,414; Referee: Kang Byung Ho (South Korea)

23 March 1994 Friendly	Northern Ireland	2–0	Romania	Belfast, Northern Ireland
	Morrow 42'; Gray 50'	Report		Stadium: Windsor Park; Attendance: 15,000; Referee: Keith Burge (Wales)

20 April 1994 Friendly	Romania	3–0	Bolivia	Bucharest, Romania
	Dumitrescu 23', 48'; Niculescu 62'	Report		Stadium: Stadionul Steaua; Attendance: 8,000; Referee: Ion Crăciunescu (Romania)

25 May 1994 Friendly	Romania	2–0	Nigeria	Bucharest, Romania
	Dumitrescu 16'; Petrescu 48'	Report		Stadium: Stadionul Steaua; Attendance: 15,000; Referee: Vassilios Nikakis (Greece)

1 June 1994 Friendly	Romania	0–0	Slovenia	Bucharest, Romania
		Report		Stadium: Stadionul Steaua; Attendance: 12,000; Referee: Piotr Werner (Poland)

12 June 1994 Friendly	Romania	1–1	Sweden	Mission Viejo, United States
	Hagi 74'	Report	Ingesson 56'	Stadium: Trabuco Hills High School; Attendance: 5,569; Referee: Joshua Patlak (United States)

18 June 1994 1994 WC	Colombia	1–3	Romania	Pasadena, United States
	Valencia 42'	Report	Răducioiu 16', 89'; Hagi 34'	Stadium: Rose Bowl; Attendance: 91,586; Referee: Jamal Al Sharif (Syria)

22 June 1994 1994 WC	Romania	1–4	Switzerland	Pontiac, United States
	Hagi 36'	Report	Sutter 16'; Chapuisat 52'; Knup 66', 73'	Stadium: Pontiac Silverdome; Attendance: 61,428; Referee: Neji Jouini (Tunisia)

26 June 1994 1994 WC	United States	0–1	Romania	Pasadena, United States
		Report	Petrescu 17'	Stadium: Rose Bowl; Attendance: 93,869; Referee: Mario van der Ende (Netherlands)

3 July 1994 1994 WC	Argentina	2–3	Romania	Pasadena, United States
	Batistuta 16' (pen.); Balbo 75'	Report	Dumitrescu 11', 18'; Hagi 58'	Stadium: Rose Bowl; Attendance: 90,469; Referee: Pierluigi Pairetto (Italy)

10 July 1994 1994 WC	Romania	2–2 (a.e.t.) (4–5 p)	Sweden	Stanford, United States
	Răducioiu 89', 101'	Report	Brolin 79'; K. Andersson 115'	Stadium: Stanford Stadium; Attendance: 83,500; Referee: Philip Don (England)
	Penalties
	Răducioiu (penalty scored); Hagi (penalty scored); Lupescu (penalty scored); Petrescu (penalty missed); Dumitrescu (penalty scored); Belodedici (penalty missed)		(penalty missed) Mild; (penalty scored) K. Andersson; (penalty scored) Brolin; (penalty scored) Ingesson; (penalty scored) R. Nilsson; (penalty scored) Larsson

7 September 1994 Euro 1996 Q	Romania	3–0	Azerbaijan	Bucharest, Romania
	Belodedici 42'; Petrescu 57'; Răducioiu 87'	Report		Stadium: Stadionul Steaua; Attendance: 10,000; Referee: Robert Sedlacek (Austria)

8 October 1994 Euro 1996 Q	France	0–0	Romania	Saint-Étienne, France
		Report		Stadium: Stade Geoffroy Guichard; Attendance: 31,144; Referee: Leif Sundell (Sweden)

12 October 1994 Friendly	England	1–1	Romania	London, England
	Lee 45'	Report	Dumitrescu 36'	Stadium: British Empire Exhibition Stadium; Attendance: 48,754; Referee: Joël Quiniou (France)

12 November 1994 Euro 1996 Q	Romania	3–2	Slovakia	Bucharest, Romania
	Popescu 7'; Hagi 47'; Prodan 81'	Report	Dubovský 56'; Chvíla 79'	Stadium: Stadionul Steaua; Attendance: 14,000; Referee: Vadzim Zhuk (Belarus)

14 December 1994 Euro 1996 Q	Israel	1–1	Romania	Ramat Gan, Israel
	Rosenthal 84'	Report	Lăcătuş 69'	Stadium: Ramat Gan Stadium; Attendance: 38,000; Referee: Antonio Martín Navarrete (Spain)

== 1995 ==
8 February 1995 Friendly	Greece	1–0	Romania	Kalamata, Greece
	Tsalouhidis 15'	Report		Stadium: Messiniakos Stadium; Attendance: 6,500; Referee: Theodoros Kefalas (Greece)

15 February 1995 Friendly	Turkey	1–1	Romania	İzmir, Turkey
	Sancaklı 88'	Report	Sabău 63'	Stadium: Altay Alsancak Stadium; Attendance: 8,581; Referee: Mitko Mitrev (Bulgaria)

29 March 1995 Euro 1996 Q	Romania	2–1	Poland	Bucharest, Romania
	Răducioiu 45'; Wandzik 57' (o.g.)	Report	Juskowiak 42' (pen.)	Stadium: Stadionul Steaua; Attendance: 25,000; Referee: Kurt Röthlisberger (Switzerland)

26 April 1995 Euro 1996 Q	Azerbaijan	1–4	Romania	Trabzon, Turkey
	Suleymanov 33'	Report	Răducioiu 1' (pen.), 68', 76'; Dumitrescu 38'	Stadium: Hüseyin Avni Aker Stadium; Attendance: 3,000; Referee: Dimitar Momirov (Bulgaria)

7 June 1995 Euro 1996 Q	Romania	2–1	Israel	Bucharest, Romania
	Lăcătuş 15'; Munteanu 65'	Report	Berkovic 50'	Stadium: Stadionul Steaua; Attendance: 18,575; Referee: Rune Pedersen (Norway)

6 September 1995 Euro 1996 Q	Poland	0–0	Romania	Zabrze, Poland
		Report		Stadium: Górnik Zabrze Stadium; Attendance: 16,000; Referee: Dermot Gallagher (England)

11 October 1995 Euro 1996 Q	Romania	1–3	France	Bucharest, Romania
	Lăcătuş 52'	Report	Karembeu 29'; Djorkaeff 41'; Zidane 74'	Stadium: Stadionul Steaua; Attendance: 23,200; Referee: Pierluigi Pairetto (Italy)

15 November 1995 Euro 1996 Q	Slovakia	0–2	Romania	Košice, Slovakia
		Report	Hagi 66'; Munteanu 82'	Stadium: Všešportový areál Attendance: 9,676; Referee: Jaap Uilenberg (Netherlands)

== 1996 ==
27 March 1996 Friendly	FR Yugoslavia	1–0	Romania	Belgrade, Yugoslavia
	Stojković 51'	Report		Stadium: Stadion Crvene Zvezde; Attendance: 28,196; Referee: Dimitar Momirov (Bulgaria)

24 April 1996 Friendly	Romania	5–0	Georgia	Bucharest, Romania
	Moldovan 26', 29', 36'; Lăcătuş 50'; Gâlcă 87'	Report		Stadium: Stadionul Steaua; Attendance: 10,000; Referee: Athanasios Zahariadis (Greece)

1 June 1996 Friendly	Romania	3–1	Moldova	Bucharest, Romania
	Petrescu 18'; Popescu 36', 40'	Report	Testemiţanu 78'	Stadium: Stadionul Steaua; Attendance: 4,000; Referee: Vasyl Melnychuk (Ukraine)

10 June 1996 Euro 1996	France	1–0	Romania	Newcastle upon Tyne, England
	Dugarry 24'	Report		Stadium: St James' Park; Attendance: 26,323; Referee: Hellmut Krug (Germany)

13 June 1996 Euro 1996	Bulgaria	1–0	Romania	Newcastle upon Tyne, England
	Stoichkov 3'	Report		Stadium: St James' Park; Attendance: 19,107; Referee: Peter Mikkelsen (Denmark)

18 June 1996 Euro 1996	Romania	1–2	Spain	Leeds, England
	Răducioiu 28'	Report	Manjarín 10'; Amor 83'	Stadium: Elland Road; Attendance: 32,719; Referee: Ahmet Çakar (Turkey)

14 August 1996 Friendly	Romania	2–0	Israel	Bucharest, Romania
	Ilie 18'; Craioveanu 82'	Report		Stadium: Stadionul Steaua; Attendance: 5,000; Referee: Juhos Attila (Hungary)

31 August 1996 1998 WCQ	Romania	3–0	Lithuania	Bucharest, Romania
	Moldovan 20'; Petrescu 65'; Gâlcă 77'	Report		Stadium: Stadionul Steaua; Attendance: 12,000; Referee: Vasyl Melnychuk (Ukraine)

18 September 1996 Friendly	Romania	1–2	United Arab Emirates	Bucharest, Romania
	Vlădoiu 60'	Report	Ibrahim 3'; Bakheet 70'	Stadium: Stadionul Cotroceni; Attendance: 5,000; Referee: Aron Huzu (Romania)

9 October 1996 1998 WCQ	Iceland	0–4	Romania	Reykjavík, Iceland
		Report	Bergsson 21' (o.g.); Hagi 61'; Popescu 76'; Petrescu 90'	Stadium: Laugardalsvöllur; Attendance: 3,314; Referee: Claude Détruche (Switzerland)

14 December 1996 1998 WCQ	Macedonia	0–3	Romania	Skopje, Macedonia
		Report	Popescu 36', 45', 90' (pen.)	Stadium: Gradski Stadion; Attendance: 12,000; Referee: Roger Philippi (Luxembourg)

== 1997 ==
29 March 1997 1998 WCQ	Romania	8–0	Liechtenstein	Bucharest, Romania
	Moldovan 10'; Popescu 28', 30', 68', 82'; Hagi 47'; Petrescu 49'; Craioveanu 71'	Report		Stadium: Stadionul Steaua; Attendance: 2,000; Referee: Romāns Lajuks (Latvia)

2 April 1997 1998 WCQ	Lithuania	0–1	Romania	Vilnius, Lithuania
		Report	Moldovan 72'	Stadium: Žalgiris Stadium; Attendance: 7,000; Referee: Edgar Steinborn (Germany)

30 April 1997 1998 WCQ	Romania	1–0	Republic of Ireland	Bucharest, Romania
	Ilie 32'	Report		Stadium: Stadionul Steaua; Attendance: 18,000; Referee: Mario van der Ende (Netherlands)

20 August 1997 1998 WCQ	Romania	4–2	Macedonia	Bucharest, Romania
	Moldovan 36' (pen.), 62'; Gâlcă 40'; Dumitrescu 66'	Report	Ǵokić 52', 90'	Stadium: Stadionul Steaua; Attendance: 12,000; Referee: Metin Tokat (Turkey)

6 September 1997 1998 WCQ	Liechtenstein	1–8	Romania	Eschen, Liechtenstein
	Frick 64'	Report	Moldovan 6'; Craioveanu 10', 32'; Doboş 36'; Munteanu 44', 45', 69'; Barbu 55'	Stadium: Sportpark Eschen-Mauren; Attendance: 1,700; Referee: Alfred Micallef (Malta)

10 September 1997 1998 WCQ	Romania	4–0	Iceland	Bucharest, Romania
	Hagi 7', 80' (pen.); Petrescu 39'; Gâlcă 65'	Report		Stadium: Stadionul Steaua; Attendance: 9,000; Referee: David Elleray (England)

11 October 1997 1998 WCQ	Republic of Ireland	1–1	Romania	Dublin, Republic of Ireland
	Cascarino 83'	Report	Hagi 53'	Stadium: Lansdowne Road; Attendance: 35,000; Referee: Nikolay Levnikov (Russia)

19 November 1997 Friendly	Spain	1–1	Romania	Palma de Mallorca, Spain
	Etxeberria 49'	Report	Popescu 82'	Stadium: Estadio Lluís Sitjar; Attendance: 30,000; Referee: Fiorenzo Treossi (Italy)

== 1998 ==
18 March 1998 Friendly	Romania	0–1	Israel	Bucharest, Romania
		Report	Mizrahi 13'	Stadium: Stadionul Steaua; Attendance: 5,000; Referee: Muhittin Boşat (Turkey)

8 April 1998 Friendly	Romania	2–1	Greece	Bucharest, Romania
	Moldovan 62'; Barbu 80'	Report	Alexandris 82'	Stadium: Stadionul Steaua; Attendance: 8,000; Referee: Hartmut Strampe (Germany)

22 April 1998 Friendly	Belgium	1–1	Romania	Brussels, Belgium
	Nilis 78'	Report	Moldovan 44'	Stadium: Stade Roi Baudouin; Attendance: 18,212; Referee: Morgan Norman (Sweden)

3 June 1998 Friendly	Romania	3–2	Paraguay	Bucharest, Romania
	Ilie 4', 57'; Hagi 84' (pen.)	Report	Cardozo 27'; Acuña 64'	Stadium: Stadionul Steaua; Attendance: 12,000; Referee: Juhos Attila (Hungary)

6 June 1998 Friendly	Romania	5–1	Moldova	Ploiești, Romania
	Popescu 32'; Petrescu 34'; Dumitrescu 49'; Moldovan 72'; Niculescu 84'	Report	Tabanov 88'	Stadium: Stadionul Ilie Oană; Attendance: 7,000; Referee: Zoran Arsić (Yugoslavia)

15 June 1998 1998 WC	Colombia	0–1	Romania	Lyon, France
		Report	Ilie 45'	Stadium: Stade de Gerland; Attendance: 37,572; Referee: Lim Kee Chong (Mauritius)

22 June 1998 1998 WC	England	1–2	Romania	Toulouse, France
	Owen 85'	Report	Moldovan 47'; Petrescu 90'	Stadium: Stade de Toulouse; Attendance: 33,500; Referee: Marc Batta (France)

26 June 1998 1998 WC	Tunisia	1–1	Romania	Saint-Denis, France
	Souayah 12' (pen.)	Report	Moldovan 71'	Stadium: Stade de France; Attendance: 77,000; Referee: Eddie Lennie (Australia)

30 June 1998 1998 WC	Croatia	1–0	Romania	Bordeaux, France
	Šuker 45' (pen.)	Report		Stadium: Parc Lescure; Attendance: 35,000; Referee: Javier Castrilli (Argentina)

19 August 1998 Friendly	Norway	0–0	Romania	Oslo, Norway
		Report		Stadium: Ullevaal Stadion; Attendance: 8,909; Referee: Kenny Clark (Scotland)

2 September 1998 Euro 2000 Q	Romania	7–0	Liechtenstein	Bucharest, Romania
	Popescu 18'; C. Munteanu 30'; Ilie 32', 45', 53'; Moldovan 56'; Haas 60' (o.g.)	Report		Stadium: Stadionul Steaua; Attendance: 3,000; Referee: Salem Prolić (Bosnia and Herzegovina)

5 September 1998 Friendly	Germany	1–1	Romania	Attard, Malta
	Nerlinger 86'	Report	Moldovan 35' (pen.)	Stadium: Ta`Qali National Stadium; Attendance: 1,500; Referee: Alfred Micallef (Malta)

10 October 1998 Euro 2000 Q	Portugal	0–1	Romania	Porto, Portugal
		Report	Munteanu 90'	Stadium: Estádio das Antas; Attendance: 37,354; Referee: Hellmut Krug (Germany)

14 October 1998 Euro 2000 Q	Hungary	1–1	Romania	Budapest, Hungary
	Hrutka 82'	Report	Moldovan 50'	Stadium: Népstadion; Attendance: 25,000; Referee: Kim Milton Nielsen (Denmark)

== 1999 ==
3 March 1999 Friendly	Romania	2–0	Estonia	Bucharest, Romania
	Ganea 16', 81'	Report		Stadium: Stadionul Naţional; Attendance: 15,000; Referee: Marcel Lică (Romania)

10 March 1999 Friendly	Romania	0–2	Israel	Bucharest, Romania
		Report	Harazi 18'; Badir 63'	Stadium: Stadionul Steaua; Attendance: 8,000; Referee: Kamen Aleksiev (Bulgaria)

27 March 1999 Euro 2000 Q	Romania	0–0	Slovakia	Bucharest, Romania
		Report		Stadium: Stadionul Naţional; Attendance: 15,000; Referee: Graham Barber (England)

31 March 1999 Euro 2000 Q	Azerbaijan	0–1	Romania	Baku, Azerbaijan
		Report	Petre 49'	Stadium: Tofiq Bahramov Republican Stadium; Attendance: 10,000; Referee: Roelof Luinge (Netherlands)

28 April 1999 Friendly	Romania	1–0	Belgium	Bucharest, Romania
	Ganea 48'	Report		Stadium: Stadionul Steaua; Attendance: 5,500; Referee: Giorgos Fasolis (Greece)

5 June 1999 Euro 2000 Q	Romania	2–0	Hungary	Bucharest, Romania
	Ilie 2'; Munteanu 14'	Report		Stadium: Stadionul Steaua; Attendance: 23,000; Referee: Rune Pedersen (Norway)

9 June 1999 Euro 2000 Q	Romania	4–0	Azerbaijan	Bucharest, Romania
	Ganea 36'; Munteanu 44' (pen.); Vlădoiu 48'; Roşu 90'	Report		Stadium: Stadionul Steaua; Attendance: 5,200; Referee: Željko Širić (Croatia)

18 August 1999 Friendly	Cyprus	2–2	Romania	Limassol, Cyprus
	Malekkos 14'; Gogić 72'	Report	Lupescu 45' (pen.); Filipescu 75'	Stadium: Tsirion Athletic Center; Attendance: 400; Referee: Kostas Kapitanis (Cyprus)

4 September 1999 Euro 2000 Q	Slovakia	1–5	Romania	Bratislava
	Labant 22' (pen.)	Report	Ilie 6'; Hagi 30'; Ciobotariu 66'; Moldovan 88', 90'	Stadium: Tehelné pole Attendance: 8,143; Referee: Graziano Cesari (Italy)

8 September 1999 Euro 2000 Q	Romania	1–1	Portugal	Bucharest, Romania
	Hagi 38'	Report	Figo 45'	Stadium: Stadionul Steaua; Attendance: 24,000; Referee: Hartmut Strampe (Germany)

9 October 1999 Euro 2000 Q	Liechtenstein	0–3	Romania	Vaduz, Liechtenstein
		Report	Roşu 26'; Ganea 65', 73'	Stadium: Rheinpark Stadion; Attendance: 2,200; Referee: Andrey Butenko (Russia)
