= UEFA Euro 1992 qualifying Group 2 =

Football tournament qualifying stage

Standings and results for Group 2 of the UEFA Euro 1992 qualifying tournament.

Group 2 consisted of Bulgaria, Romania, San Marino, Scotland and Switzerland.

== Final table ==
Pos	Team	Pld	W	D	L	GF	GA	GD	Pts	Qualification	(Scotland)	(Switzerland)	(Romania)	(Bulgaria)	(San Marino)
1	Scotland	8	4	3	1	14	7	+7	11	Qualify for final tournament	—	2–1	2–1	1–1	4–0
2	Switzerland	8	4	2	2	19	7	+12	10		2–2	—	0–0	2–0	7–0
3	Romania	8	4	2	2	13	7	+6	10		1–0	1–0	—	0–3	6–0
4	Bulgaria	8	3	3	2	15	8	+7	9		1–1	2–3	1–1	—	4–0
5	San Marino	8	0	0	8	1	33	−32	0		0–2	0–4	1–3	0–3	—

Source: UEFA
Rules for classification: Qualification tiebreakers

== Results ==
12 September 1990
20:00 UTC+2

Switzerland	2 – 0	Bulgaria
Hottiger 19'; Bickel 63'	Report

Charmilles Stadium, Geneva
Attendance: 9,088
Referee: Guy Goethals (Belgium)
12 September 1990
20:00 UTC+1

Scotland	2 – 1	Romania
Robertson 37'; McCoist 76'	Report	Cămătaru 13'

Hampden Park, Glasgow
Attendance: 12,801
Referee: Ildefonso Urizar Azpitarte (Spain)

17 October 1990
15:00 UTC+3

Romania	0 – 3	Bulgaria
	Report	Sirakov 28'; Todorov 48', 76'

Steaua Stadium, Bucharest
Attendance: 15,350
Referee: José Rosa dos Santos (Portugal)
17 October 1990
20:00 UTC+1

Scotland	2 – 1	Switzerland
Robertson 34' (pen.); McAllister 53'	Report	Knup 65' (pen.)

Hampden Park, Glasgow
Attendance: 27,740
Referee: Esa Antero Palsi (Finland)

14 November 1990
18:00 UTC+2

Bulgaria	1 – 1	Scotland
Todorov 74'	Report	McCoist 9'

Vasil Levski National Stadium, Sofia
Attendance: 31,462
Referee: Friedrich Kaupe (Austria)
14 November 1990
20:30 UTC+1

San Marino	0 – 4	Switzerland
	Report	Sutter 7'; Chapuisat 27'; Knup 43'; Chassot 87'

Stadio Olimpico, Serravalle
Attendance: 931
Referee: Costas Kapsos (Cyprus)

5 December 1990
18:00 UTC+2

Romania	6 – 0	San Marino
Sabău 2'; Mateuţ 18'; Răducioiu 43'; Lupescu 56'; Badea 77'; Petrescu 85'	Report

Steaua Stadium, Bucharest
Attendance: 6,380
Referee: Manfred Roßner (Germany)

27 March 1991
20:00 UTC+0

Scotland	1 – 1	Bulgaria
Collins 83'	Report	Kostadinov 89'

Hampden Park, Glasgow
Attendance: 33,119
Referee: Erik Fredriksson (Sweden)
27 March 1991
20:15 UTC+1

San Marino	1 – 3	Romania
Pasolini 30' (pen.)	Report	Hagi 18' (pen.); Răducioiu 46'; Matteoni 83' (o.g.)

Stadio Olimpico, Serravalle
Attendance: 745
Referee: Roger Philippi (Luxembourg)

3 April 1991
20:15 UTC+2

Switzerland	0 – 0	Romania
	Report

Stade de la Maladière, Neuchâtel
Attendance: 9,262
Referee: Gérard Biguet (France)

1 May 1991
18:00 UTC+3

Bulgaria	2 – 3	Switzerland
Kostadinov 12'; Sirakov 27'	Report	Knup 59', 85'; Türkyılmaz 90'

Vasil Levski National Stadium, Sofia
Attendance: 35,142
Referee: Karl-Josef Assenmacher (Germany)
1 May 1991
20:00 UTC+2

San Marino	0 – 2	Scotland
	Report	Strachan 63' (pen.); Durie 67'

Stadio Olimpico, Serravalle
Attendance: 3,512
Referee: Besnik Kaimi (Albania)

22 May 1991
20:00 UTC+2

San Marino	0 – 3	Bulgaria
	Report	Ivanov 13'; Sirakov 20'; Penev 70'

Stadio Olimpico, Serravalle
Attendance: 612
Referee: Victor Mintoff (Malta)

5 June 1991
20:30 UTC+2

Switzerland	7 – 0	San Marino
Knup 3', 87'; Hottiger 13'; Sutter 29'; Hermann 55'; Ohrel 78'; Türkyılmaz 90'	Report

Espenmoos, St. Gallen
Attendance: 6,982
Referee: Erman Toroğlu (Turkey)

11 September 1991
20:15 UTC+2

Switzerland	2 – 2	Scotland
Chapuisat 30'; Hermann 38'	Report	Durie 47'; McCoist 83'

Wankdorf Stadium, Bern
Attendance: 42,012
Referee: Tullio Lanese (Italy)

16 October 1991
18:00 UTC+3

Bulgaria	4 – 0	San Marino
Penev 18'; Stoichkov 31' (pen.); Yankov 38'; Iliev 84'	Report

Balgarska Armia Stadium, Sofia
Attendance: 7,352
Referee: Jiří Ulrich (Czechoslovakia)
16 October 1991
18:00 UTC+3

Romania	1 – 0	Scotland
Hagi 75' (pen.)	Report

Steaua Stadium, Bucharest
Attendance: 15,850
Referee: Aron Schmidhuber (Germany)

13 November 1991
19:00 UTC+0

Scotland	4 – 0	San Marino
McStay 10'; Gough 31'; Durie 38'; McCoist 62'	Report

Hampden Park, Glasgow
Attendance: 35,170
Referee: Rune Pedersen (Norway)
13 November 1991
21:00 UTC+2

Romania	1 – 0	Switzerland
Mateuţ 69'	Report

Steaua Stadium, Bucharest
Attendance: 23,000
Referee: John Blankenstein (Netherlands)

20 November 1991
18:00 UTC+2

Bulgaria	1 – 1	Romania
Sirakov 55'	Report	Popescu 31'

Vasil Levski National Stadium, Sofia
Attendance: 27,744
Referee: Peter Mikkelsen (Denmark)

== Goalscorers ==
There were 62 goals scored in 20 matches, for an average of 3.1 goals per match.

6 goals

- (Switzerland) Adrian Knup

4 goals

- (Bulgaria) Nasko Sirakov
- (Scotland) Ally McCoist

3 goals

- (Bulgaria) Nikolay Todorov
- (Scotland) Gordon Durie

2 goals

- (Bulgaria) Emil Kostadinov
- (Bulgaria) Lyuboslav Penev
- (Romania) Gheorghe Hagi
- (Romania) Dorin Mateuț
- (Romania) Florin Răducioiu
- (Scotland) John Robertson
- (Switzerland) Stéphane Chapuisat
- (Switzerland) Heinz Hermann
- (Switzerland) Marc Hottiger
- (Switzerland) Alain Sutter
- (Switzerland) Kubilay Türkyilmaz

1 goal

- (Bulgaria) Nikolay Iliev
- (Bulgaria) Trifon Ivanov
- (Bulgaria) Hristo Stoichkov
- (Bulgaria) Zlatko Yankov
- (Romania) Pavel Badea
- (Romania) Rodion Cămătaru
- (Romania) Ioan Lupescu
- (Romania) Dan Petrescu
- (Romania) Adrian Popescu
- (Romania) Ioan Sabău
- (San Marino) Valdes Pasolini
- (Scotland) John Collins
- (Scotland) Richard Gough
- (Scotland) Gary McAllister
- (Scotland) Paul McStay
- (Scotland) Gordon Strachan
- (Switzerland) Thomas Bickel
- (Switzerland) Frédéric Chassot
- (Switzerland) Christophe Ohrel

1 own goal

- (San Marino) Ivan Matteoni (against Romania)
