= Nikolay Todorov (footballer, born 1964) =

Bulgarian footballer and manager

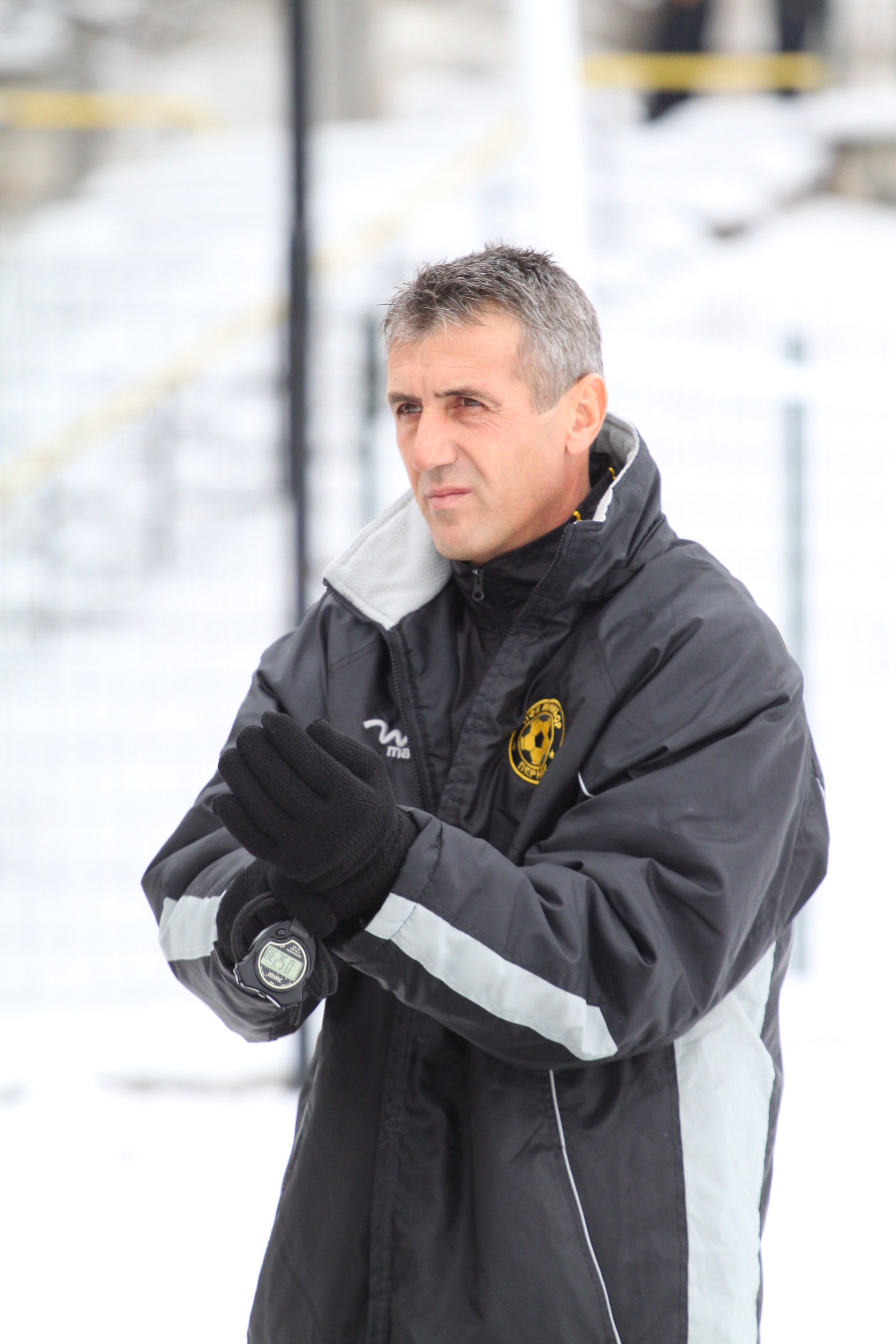

Personal information
- Full name: Nikolay Stoychev Todorov
- Date of birth: 26 September 1964 (age 62)
- Place of birth: Balchik, Bulgaria
- Position: Midfielder

Team information
- Current team: Minyor Pernik (manager)

Youth career
- Dobrudzha Dobrich

Senior career*
Years	Team	Apps	(Gls)
1982–1984	Dobrudzha Dobrich	65	(14)
1984	CSKA Sofia	1	(0)
1985–1986	Levski Sofia	30	(3)
1986–1991	Lokomotiv Sofia	136	(33)
1991–1992	Montpellier	26	(0)
1992–1993	AS Cannes	21	(3)
1993–1995	Levski Sofia	54	(18)
1995–1996	Anorthosis	22	(5)
1996	Levski Sofia	8	(4)
1996–1997	Sarıyer	21	(3)
1997–1999	Levski Sofia	50	(11)
Total		434	(94)

International career
1989–1994	Bulgaria	13	(3)

Managerial career
- 2002–2007: Levski Sofia (youth coach)
- 2007: Sportist Svoge
- 2008: Velbazhd Kyustendil
- 2009–2012: Minyor Pernik (assistant)
- 2012–2013: Minyor Pernik
- 2013–2014: Vitosha Bistritsa
- 2016: Botev Vratsa
- 2017–2018: Minyor Pernik
- * Club domestic league appearances and goals

Nikolay Todorov (Bulgarian: Николай Тодоров; born 26 September 1964, in Balchik) is a retired Bulgarian professional football midfielder and currently manager.

Todorov played for several clubs in Europe and the Bulgaria national football team.

Todorov's son, also named Nikolay, is currently a striker for Arbroath F.C. in the Scottish Championship.

== Career ==
Todorov started his career in Dobrudzha Dobrich. He played for the most of his career in Levski Sofia where he made a name for himself, when he scored the second and winning goal for Levski vs. Scottish giants Rangers FC in a 1993–94 UEFA Champions League clash, when Levski eliminated the Scottish champions. He also played in CSKA Sofia, Lokomotiv Sofia, Montpellier HSC, SM Caen, Anorthosis Famagusta FC and Septemvri Sofia. He played one season in the Turkish Super Lig with Sarıyer G.K. His nickname the Kaiser comes from the Dutch striker Piet Keizer.

He played twelve games for the Bulgaria national football team and scored 3 goals.

After his retiring from a playing career, he coached Levski's youth team and in September 2012 he was appointed manager of PFC Minyor Pernik. He took over as head coach of Botev Vratsa in December 2015, a position he held until early May 2016.

On 14 December 2017, Todorov returned at the helm of Minyor Pernik.

=== International goals ===
Scores and results list Bulgaria's goal tally first.

#	Date	Venue	Opponent	Score	Result	Competition
1.	17 October 1990	Steaua Stadium, Bucharest, Romania	Romania	2–0	3–0	Euro 1992 qualifier
2.	17 October 1990	Steaua Stadium, Bucharest, Romania	Romania	3–0	3–0	Euro 1992 qualifier
3.	14 November 1990	Vasil Levski National Stadium, Sofia, Bulgaria	Scotland	1–1	1–1	Euro 1992 qualifier

== Honours ==
=== Player ===
Levski Sofia

- Bulgarian League: 1985, 1994, 1995
- Bulgarian Cup: 1994, 1998

Montpellier

- Coupe de la Ligue: 1991–92
