= Ioan Sabău =

Romanian football manager (born 1968)

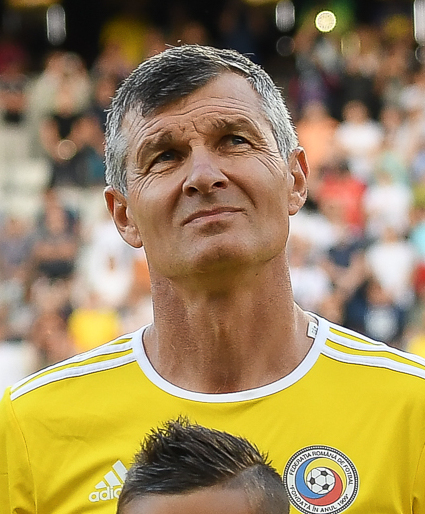
- Sabău în 2018

Personal information
- Full name: Ioan Ovidiu Sabău
- Date of birth: 12 February 1968 (age 58)
- Place of birth: Câmpia Turzii, Romania
- Height: 1.76 m (5 ft 9 in)
- Position: Midfielder

Team information
- Current team: Farul Constanța (head coach)

Youth career
- 1982–1985: Universitatea Cluj

Senior career*
Years	Team	Apps	(Gls)
1985–1987	Universitatea Cluj	35	(4)
1988	ASA Târgu Mureș	12	(2)
1988–1990	Dinamo București	49	(8)
1990–1992	Feyenoord	39	(11)
1992–1996	Brescia	99	(10)
1996–1997	Reggiana	19	(1)
1997–1998	Brescia	7	(1)
1998–2000	Rapid București	43	(2)
2000–2001	Universitatea Cluj	19	(6)
2001–2003	Rapid București	35	(1)
2005	Gaz Metan Mediaș	1	(0)
Total		358	(46)

International career
1988–2001	Romania	55	(8)

Managerial career
- 2000–2001: Universitatea Cluj (player/coach)
- 2003: Universitatea Cluj
- 2003–2005: Gaz Metan Mediaș
- 2005–2009: Gloria Bistrița
- 2009–2010: Politehnica Timișoara
- 2010–2011: FCM Târgu Mureș
- 2012: FCM Târgu Mureș
- 2012: Rapid București
- 2013–2014: ASA Târgu Mureș
- 2023: Universitatea Cluj
- 2023–2025: Universitatea Cluj
- 2026–: Farul Constanța
- * Club domestic league appearances and goals

Ioan "Neluțu" Ovidiu Sabău (born 12 February 1968) is a Romanian professional football manager and former player, currently in charge of Liga I club Farul Constanța.

He played as a midfielder for clubs in Romania, Italy, and the Netherlands, including Universitatea Cluj, Dinamo București, Feyenoord, Brescia, and Rapid București.

Sabău earned 55 caps for the Romania national team, representing his country at the 1990 FIFA World Cup and UEFA Euro 1996. After retiring from playing, he managed several Romanian clubs, including Gaz Metan Mediaș, Politehnica Timișoara, and Universitatea Cluj, whom he coached to the Cupa României final in the 2022–23 season, which they lost in a penalty shootout.

== Club career ==
=== Universitatea Cluj and ASA Târgu Mureș ===
Sabău, nicknamed Moțul due to his ambition, a trait associated with the people from Țara Moților, was born on 12 February 1968 in Câmpia Turzii, Romania. He began playing junior-level football in 1985 at Universitatea Cluj, under the guidance of coaches Alexa Uifăleanu and Nicolae Szoboszlay. He made his professional debut playing for Universitatea in the 1984–85 Divizia B season under coach Remus Vlad, helping the team win promotion to Divizia A. In the following season, he made his debut in the Romanian top-league on 8 March 1986, replacing Nicolae Bucur for the last nine minutes of a 1–0 loss to Rapid București, also under coach Remus Vlad. In 1988, Sabău had offers from Dinamo București and Steaua București, choosing to play for the first because of coach Mircea Lucescu's project of building a team composed of mainly young players like himself. But Steaua's officials with president Ion Alecsandrescu and the relatives of dictator Nicolae Ceaușescu, his son Valentin who was Steaua's unofficial president and brother Ilie who was a Romanian army general, insisted and pressured Sabău on several occasions to sign with the club, especially during his military service in which he played for Ministry of National Defence club and friend team of Steaua, ASA Târgu Mureș. He refused, eventually going to Dinamo which gave four players to Universitatea Cluj in exchange for him, including Florin Prunea.

=== Dinamo București ===
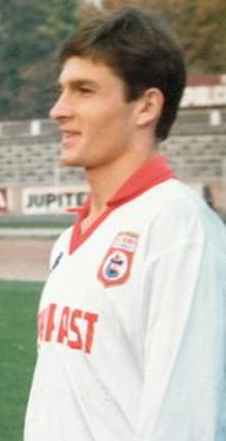
Sabău with Dinamo București c. 1989

In his first season with The Red Dogs, the team reached the quarter-finals in the 1988–89 European Cup Winners' Cup where they were eliminated on the away goals rule after 1–1 on aggregate by Sampdoria. In the following season, the club won The Double, as Lucescu gave him 24 league appearances in which he scored five goals, and also scored one goal in the 6–4 victory in the Cupa României final against Steaua. In the same season, Sabău played seven matches and scored two goals against Panathinaikos in the 1989–90 European Cup Winners' Cup where Dinamo reached the semi-finals, being eliminated after a 2–0 aggregate loss to Anderlecht.

=== Feyenoord ===
After the 1989 Romanian Revolution, Sabău was signed by Dutch club Feyenoord which paid for his transfer over $1 million. He made his Eredivise debut on 1 September 1990 under coach Gunder Bengtsson in a 6–0 home win over MVV Maastricht in which he scored once. In his first season, he won the 1990–91 KNVB Cup, coach Wim Jansen using him the entire match in the 1–0 victory against BVV Den Bosch in the final. In the following season, he was teammates with compatriot Marian Damaschin. The club reached the 1991–92 European Cup Winners' Cup semi-finals, Sabău playing three matches in the campaign. Subsequently, he won another KNVB Cup, coach Jansen sending him in the 75th minute to replace Rob Witschge in the 3–0 win over Roda in the final.

=== Brescia and Reggiana ===
In 1992 he was sold for over €1 million by Feyenoord to Mircea Lucescu's "Brescia Romena", as he was teammates there with fellow Romanians Gheorghe Hagi, Florin Răducioiu, Dorin Mateuț and Dănuț Lupu. He made his Serie A debut on 5 September 1992 in a 0–0 draw against Napoli, three months later scoring his first goal in a 1–1 draw against Atalanta. At the end of his first season, the team was relegated to Serie B, but Sabău was named the best Serie A right midfielder. In his second season with Brescia, he helped them win the Anglo-Italian Cup, defeating Notts County 1–0 in the final at Wembley and also contributed to their third-place finish in Serie B and subsequent promotion back to Serie A. However, they were relegated once again at the end of the 1994–95 season. He spent one more season with The Lioness in Serie B. In July 1996, Lucescu signed with Serie A club, Reggiana, bringing Sabău with him, but the team finished the season in last place. Subsequently, he returned to Brescia where on 16 May 1998 he made his last Serie A appearance in a 3–1 away victory against Parma, totaling 70 matches with six goals in the competition.

=== Rapid, "U" Cluj and Mediaș ===
Sabău returned to Romania in 1998 at Rapid București, on the advice of coach Mircea Lucescu. He appeared in 22 matches in which he scored one goal in the 1998–99 season, helping the team win its first title after 32 years. In the 2000–01 season, he was a player-coach at Universitatea Cluj in Divizia C, helping the team achieve promotion to Divizia B. However, he departed from the club shortly thereafter due to disagreements with club officials. In 2001, Sabău returned to play for Rapid, and in his first season, he won the Cupa României, as coach Mircea Rednic used him the entire match in the 2–1 victory against Dinamo București in the final. He started the next season by winning the 2002 Supercupa României, with coach Rednic using him the full 90 minutes in another 2–1 win over Dinamo. They finished the 2002–03 season as champions, Sabău scoring once in the 16 matches Rednic played him. He made his last Divizia A appearance on 24 May 2003 in Rapid's 3–0 home victory against UTA Arad, totaling 172 games with 17 goals in the competition and 25 games with three goals in European competitions. Sabău made his last appearance as a footballer at the end of the 2004–05 Divizia B season for Gaz Metan Mediaș, a team for which he was also the head coach at that time. Throughout his career, Sabău was placed several times among the top five in the Romanian Footballer of the Year ranking, finishing second in 1989.

== International career ==
Sabău played 55 games and scored eight goals for Romania, making his debut on 3 February 1988 at age 19 under coach Emerich Jenei in a friendly which ended with a 2–0 away victory against Israel. He scored his first goal three days later in a 2–2 friendly draw against Poland.

Subsequently, he played six matches during the successful 1990 World Cup qualifiers, scoring two goals, one in a 3–0 win over Greece and one in the 3–1 victory against Denmark which was decisive for the qualification to the final tournament. There, he was used by coach Emerich Jenei as a starter in all four matches, as Romania got eliminated by Ireland in the round of 16. Sabău played seven games and scored one goal in the Euro 1992 qualifiers, and then made eight appearances during the successful 1994 World Cup qualifiers, but could not be part of the final tournament squad due to an injury. He played one game in the successful Euro 1996 qualifiers. Afterwards he was selected by coach Anghel Iordănescu to be part of the final tournament squad, but did not play a single match, being injured.

Sabău played three games during the successful Euro 2000 qualifiers, but was not selected in the squad for the final tournament. He made his last three appearances for the national team during the 2002 World Cup qualifiers, of which one was in a 2–0 away victory in a group match against rivals Hungary, and then two in both legs of the play-off against Slovenia which was lost with 3–2 on aggregate.

For representing his country at the 1990 World Cup, Sabău was decorated by President of Romania Traian Băsescu on 25 March 2008 with the Ordinul "Meritul Sportiv" – (The Medal "The Sportive Merit") class III.

== Managerial career ==
Sabău started his coaching career in 2000 at Universitatea Cluj in Divizia C, also being a player, helping the team gain promotion to Divizia B. He left shortly afterwards following a conflict with the club's officials. At the beginning of the 2003–04 Divizia B season, he returned to Universitatea, but left after only two games. He went to coach fellow Divizia B team Gaz Metan Mediaș for two seasons, but did not manage to win a promotion to Divizia A. In 2005 he went to coach Divizia A club Gloria Bistrița for four seasons, the highlight of this period being a sixth-place finish in the 2006–07 season. The team also reached 2007 UEFA Intertoto Cup final, earning a 2–1 home victory against Atlético Madrid, but lost the second leg with 1–0, thus losing the final on the away goals rule.

In the 2009–10 season, Sabău coached Politehnica Timișoara, eliminating UEFA Cup holders Shakhtar Donetsk in the third round of the Champions League, which was the team of his former coach, Mircea Lucescu. Subsequently, they were eliminated by VfB Stuttgart in the next round, before reaching the Europa League group stage, where their campaign ended. Domestically, he helped Politehnica finish the championship in fifth place. In the following years, he coached first league clubs FCM Târgu Mureș, on two occasions, and Rapid București, but also had a spell in the second league at ASA Târgu Mureș, without any notable results.

In January 2023, after almost 10 years of inactivity, Sabău came back to coaching, signing with Universitatea Cluj. The team reached the 2023 Cupa României final where they were defeated by Sepsi OSK. He left the club after saving the team from relegation at the end of the season. However, he came back to "U" in August 2023. In the 2024–25 season, he helped the club finish in fourth place. Subsequently, the club played in the second round of the 2025–26 Conference League, being eliminated with 2–1 on aggregate by Ararat-Armenia. In October 2025, Sabău resigned, leaving "U" after the team's 10th-place standing following the first 13 rounds of the 2025–26 season.

== Personal life ==
Sabău is featured on the main cover of FIFA 96, shown being tackled by Andy Legg during the Anglo-Italian Cup final, while playing for Brescia against Notts County, and is the first Romanian to appear on the cover of a FIFA video game. He is a member of the Jehovah's Witnesses. Sports commentator Ilie Dobre wrote a book about him titled Ioan Ovidiu Sabău și Patima fotbalului (Ioan Ovidiu Sabău and the passion for football), which was released in 2002.

== Career statistics ==
=== Club ===
Appearances and goals by club, season and competition
Club	Season	League			National cup (Note: Includes Cupa României, KNVB Beker, Coppa Italia)		Europe		Other		Total	
Club	Season	Division	Apps	Goals	Apps	Goals	Apps	Goals	Apps	Goals	Apps	Goals
Universitatea Cluj	1984–85	Divizia B	2	0			–		–		2	0
Universitatea Cluj	1985–86	Divizia A	8	1	1	0	–		–		2	0
Universitatea Cluj	1986–87	Divizia A	21	3	1	0	–		–		2	0
Universitatea Cluj	1987–88	Divizia A	4	0	–		–		–		4	0
Universitatea Cluj	Total		35	4	2	0	–		–		37	4
ASA Târgu Mureș	1987–88	Divizia A	12	2	1	0	–		–		13	2
Dinamo București	1988–89	Divizia A	25	3	4	0	6 (Note: Appearances in European Cup Winners' Cup)	0	–		35	3
Dinamo București	1989–90	Divizia A	24	5	4	1	7	2	–		35	8
Dinamo București	Total		49	8	8	1	13	2	–		70	11
Feyenoord	1990–91	Eredivisie	27	6	4	0	–		–		31	6
Feyenoord	1991–92	Eredivisie	12	5	3	0	3	0	0	0	18	5
Feyenoord	Total		39	11	7	0	3	0	0	0	49	11
Brescia	1992–93	Serie A	32	4	2	0	–		1 (Note: Appearance in Serie A relegation tie-breaker)	0	35	4
Brescia	1993–94	Serie B	25	6	3	2	–		–		28	8
Brescia	1994–95	Serie A	12	0	0	0	–		–		12	0
Brescia	1995–96	Serie B	30	0	1	0	–		–		31	0
Brescia	Total		99	10	6	2	–		1	0	106	12
Reggiana	1996–97	Serie A	19	1	0	0	–		–		19	1
Brescia	1997–98	Serie A	7	1	2	0	–		–		9	1
Rapid București	1998–99	Divizia A	22	1	5	0	2 (Note: Appearances in UEFA Cup Winners' Cup)	1	0	0	29	2
Rapid București	1999–00	Divizia A	21	1	4	0	1 (Note: Appearance in UEFA Champions League)	0	0	0	26	1
Rapid București	Total		43	2	9	0	3	1	0	0	55	3
Universitatea Cluj	2000–01	Divizia C	19	6	–		–		–		19	6
Rapid București	2001–02	Divizia A	19	0	3	0	3 (Note: Appearances in UEFA Cup)	0	–		25	0
Rapid București	2002–03	Divizia A	16	1	1	0	3	0	1 (Note: Appearances in Supercupa României)	0	21	1
Rapid București	Total		35	1	4	0	6	0	1	0	46	1
Gaz Metan Mediaș	2004–05	Divizia B	1	0	–		–		–		1	0
Career total			358	46	39	0	25	3	2	0	424	49

=== International ===
Appearances and goals by national team and year.
National team	Year	Apps	Goals
Romania	1988	9	2
Romania	1989	8	3
Romania	1990	12	2
Romania	1991	5	0
Romania	1992	3	0
Romania	1993	5	0
Romania	1994	1	0
Romania	1995	2	1
Romania	1996	2	0
Romania	1997	0	0
Romania	1998	2	0
Romania	1999	3	0
Romania	2000	1	0
Romania	2001	3	0
Total		56	8

Scores and results list Romania's goal tally first, score column indicates score after each Sabău goal.

List of international goals scored by Ioan Sabău
Goal	Date	Venue	Opponent	Score	Result	Competition
1	6 February 1988	Kiryat Eliezer Stadium, Haifa, Israel	Poland	2–1	2–2	Friendly
2	2 November 1988	Stadionul Steaua, Bucharest, Romania	Greece	3–0	3–0	1990 World Cup qualifiers
3	29 March 1989	Municipal Stadium, Sibiu, Romania	Italy	1–0	1–0	Friendly
4	12 April 1989	Stadion Wojska Polskiego, Warsaw, Poland	Poland	1–1	1–2	Friendly
5	15 November 1989	Stadionul Steaua, Bucharest, Romania	Denmark	2–1	3–1	1990 World Cup qualifiers
6	25 April 1990	Kiryat Eliezer Stadium, Haifa, Israel	Israel	3–0	4–1	Friendly
7	5 December 1990	Stadionul Național, Bucharest, Romania	San Marino	1–0	6–0	Euro 1992 qualifiers
8	15 February 1995	İzmir Atatürk Stadium, İzmir, Turkey	Turkey	1–0	1–1	Friendly

== Managerial statistics ==
As of 20 November 2026

Team	From	To	Record							
Team	From	To	G	W	D	L	GF	GA	GD	Win %
(Romania) Universitatea Cluj	1 July 2000	30 June 2001	28	20	5	3	65	19	+46	71.43
(Romania) Universitatea Cluj	1 July 2003	31 August 2003	2	1	0	1	3	3	+0	50.00
(Romania) Gaz Metan Mediaș	5 September 2003	26 June 2005	61	37	13	11	96	46	+50	60.66
(Romania) Gloria Bistrița	1 July 2005	15 June 2009	148	55	29	64	167	171	−4	37.16
(Romania) Politehnica Timișoara	1 July 2009	26 May 2010	44	22	13	9	72	50	+22	50.00
(Romania) FCM Târgu Mureș	3 September 2010	27 September 2011	39	14	11	14	38	42	−4	35.90
(Romania) FCM Târgu Mureș	18 March 2012	30 June 2012	13	5	2	6	17	21	−4	38.46
(Romania) Rapid București	1 July 2012	20 October 2012	16	9	3	4	26	17	+9	56.25
(Romania) ASA Târgu Mureș	10 October 2013	22 March 2014	13	5	5	3	13	8	+5	38.46
(Romania) Universitatea Cluj	1 January 2023	1 June 2023	21	11	4	6	30	29	+1	52.38
(Romania) Universitatea Cluj	24 August 2023	18 October 2025	95	37	29	29	122	103	+19	38.95
(Romania) Farul Constanța	5 June 2026	present	17	6	6	5	26	26	+0	35.29
Total			497	222	120	155	675	535	+140	44.67

== Honours ==
=== Player ===
Universitatea Cluj

- Divizia B: 1984–85
- Divizia C: 2000–01

Dinamo București

- Divizia A: 1989–90
- Cupa României: 1989–90

Feyenoord

- KNVB Cup: 1990–91, 1991–92
- Johan Cruijff Shield: 1991

Brescia

- Anglo-Italian Cup: 1993–94

Rapid București

- Divizia A: 1998–99, 2002–03
- Cupa României: 2001–02
- Supercupa României: 1999, 2002

Individual

- Romanian Footballer of the Year: runner-up 1989; fifth place 1988, 1993

=== Coach ===
Universitatea Cluj

- Divizia C: 2000–01
- Cupa României runner-up: 2022–23

Gloria Bistrița

- Intertoto Cup runner-up: 2007

Individual

- Romania Coach of the Month: October 2023, September 2024
