= 1990 FIFA World Cup qualification – UEFA Group 1 =

The 1990 FIFA World Cup qualification UEFA Group 1 was a UEFA qualifying group for the 1990 FIFA World Cup. The group comprised Bulgaria, Denmark, Greece and Romania.

The group was won by Romania, who qualified for the 1990 FIFA World Cup. Runners-up Denmark failed to qualify as their record was the worst of the runners-up from the groups containing only four teams.

== Standings ==
| Pos | Team | Pld | W | D | L | GF | GA | GD | Pts | Qualification | Romania national football team | Denmark national football team | Greece national football team | Bulgaria national football team |
|---|---|---|---|---|---|---|---|---|---|---|---|---|---|---|
| 1 | Romania | 6 | 4 | 1 | 1 | 10 | 5 | +5 | 9 | Qualification to 1990 FIFA World Cup | — | 3–1 | 3–0 | 1–0 |
| 2 | Denmark | 6 | 3 | 2 | 1 | 15 | 6 | +9 | 8 | | 3–0 | — | 7–1 | 1–1 |
| 3 | Greece | 6 | 1 | 2 | 3 | 3 | 15 | −12 | 4 | | 0–0 | 1–1 | — | 1–0 |
| 4 | Bulgaria | 6 | 1 | 1 | 4 | 6 | 8 | −2 | 3 | | 1–3 | 0–2 | 4–0 | — |

=== Results ===
19 October 1988

| Greece | 1–1 | Denmark |
|---|---|---|
| Mitropoulos 41' | (Report) | Povlsen 56' |

Olympic Stadium, Athens
Attendance: 19,349
Referee: Dušan Krchňák (Czechoslovakia)
19 October 1988

| Bulgaria | 1–3 | Romania |
|---|---|---|
| Kolev 31' | (Report) | Mateuţ 25'; Cămătaru 79', 89' |

Vasil Levski National Stadium, Sofia
Attendance: 60,000
Referee: Michał Listkiewicz (Poland)

2 November 1988

| Romania | 3–0 | Greece |
|---|---|---|
| Mateuţ 26'; Hagi 40' (pen.); Sabău 84' | (Report) |

Steaua Stadium, Bucharest
Attendance: 15,000
Referee: Hubert Forstinger (Austria)
2 November 1988

| Denmark | 1–1 | Bulgaria |
|---|---|---|
| Elstrup 8' | (Report) | Sadakov 38' |

Idrætsparken, Copenhagen
Attendance: 34,600
Referee: George Smith (Scotland)

26 April 1989

| Greece | 0–0 | Romania |
|---|---|---|
| | (Report) |

Olympic Stadium, Athens
Attendance: 15,000
Referee: Aron Schmidhuber (West Germany)
26 April 1989

| Bulgaria | 0–2 | Denmark |
|---|---|---|
| | (Report) | Povlsen 41'; B. Laudrup 89' |

Vasil Levski National Stadium, Sofia
Attendance: 37,000
Referee: Alain Delmer (France)

17 May 1989

| Romania | 1–0 | Bulgaria |
|---|---|---|
| Popescu 35' | (Report) |

Steaua Stadium, Bucharest
Attendance: 30,000
Referee: Sergei Khusainov (Soviet Union)
17 May 1989

| Denmark | 7–1 | Greece |
|---|---|---|
| B. Laudrup 25'; Bartram 42'; K. Nielsen 55'; Povlsen 56'; Vilfort 74'; Andersen 85'; M. Laudrup 90' (pen.) | (Report) | Mavridis 40' |

Idrætsparken, Copenhagen
Attendance: 38,500
Referee: Keith Hackett (England)

11 October 1989

| Bulgaria | 4–0 | Greece |
|---|---|---|
| Ivanov 72'; Bankov 76'; Iskrenov 79'; Stoichkov 88' | (Report) |

Yuri Gagarin Stadium, Varna
Attendance: 15,000
Referee: Rolf Blattmann (Switzerland)
11 October 1989

| Denmark | 3–0 | Romania |
|---|---|---|
| K. Nielsen 4'; B. Laudrup 26'; Povlsen 85' | (Report) |

Idrætsparken, Copenhagen
Attendance: 45,400
Referee: Claude Bouillet (France)

15 November 1989

| Greece | 1–0 | Bulgaria |
|---|---|---|
| Nioplias 49' | (Report) |

Olympic Stadium, Athens
Attendance: 1,500
Referee: Zoran Petrović (Yugoslavia)
15 November 1989

| Romania | 3–1 | Denmark |
|---|---|---|
| Balint 25', 61'; Sabău 38' | (Report) | Povlsen 6' |

Steaua Stadium, Bucharest
Attendance: 30,000
Referee: Tullio Lanese (Italy)

== Goalscorers ==
There were 34 goals scored during the 12 games, an average of 2.83 goals per game.

5 goals

- (Denmark) Flemming Povlsen

3 goals

- (Denmark) Brian Laudrup

2 goals

- (Denmark) Kent Nielsen
- (Romania) Gavril Balint
- (Romania) Rodion Cămătaru
- (Romania) Dorin Mateuţ
- (Romania) Ioan Sabău

1 goal

- (Bulgaria) Kalin Bankov
- (Bulgaria) Bozhidar Iskrenov
- (Bulgaria) Trifon Ivanov
- (Bulgaria) Hristo Kolev
- (Bulgaria) Anyo Sadkov
- (Bulgaria) Hristo Stoichkov
- (Denmark) Henrik Andersen
- (Denmark) Jan Bartram
- (Denmark) Lars Elstrup
- (Denmark) Michael Laudrup
- (Denmark) Kim Vilfort
- (Greece) Kostas Mavridis
- (Greece) Tasos Mitropoulos
- (Greece) Nikos Nioplias
- (Romania) Gheorghe Hagi
- (Romania) Gheorghe Popescu
