= Adrian Popescu =

Romanian footballer

Personal information
- Full name: Adrian Mihai Popescu
- Date of birth: 26 July 1960 (age 66)
- Place of birth: Craiova, Romania
- Height: 1.78 m (5 ft 10 in)
- Position: Right-back

Youth career
- 1970–1980: Universitatea Craiova

Senior career*
Years	Team	Apps	(Gls)
1980–1992	Universitatea Craiova	236	(18)
1992–1995	Locarno		
1995	Universitatea Craiova	7	(0)
1996–1997	Electroputere Craiova	14	(0)
1997–1998	Constructorul Craiova		
1998–1999	Politehnica Iași	13	(2)
Total		270	(20)

International career
1990–1992	Romania	7	(1)

Managerial career
- 1999: Universitatea Craiova (assistant)
- 2014–2016: Universitatea Craiova (assistant)
- 2016: Concordia Chiajna (assistant)
- * Club domestic league appearances and goals

Adrian Mihai Popescu (born 26 July 1960) is a former Romanian footballer who played as a right-back.

== Club career ==
Popescu was born on 26 July 1960 in Craiova, Romania and began playing junior-level football at local club Universitatea. He made his Divizia A debut on 14 March 1981 under coach Ion Oblemenco in a 2–1 away loss to Jiul Petroșani. That was his only appearance during that season, as the club won The Double. Subsequently, he helped the club win the 1982–83 Cupa României, as coach Constantin Oțet sent him in the 63rd minute to replace Ion Geolgău in the 2–1 win over Politehnica Timișoara in the final.

Popescu was a member of the "Craiova Maxima" generation and made 21 appearances with one goal for "U" Craiova in European competitions. Contributing three matches to the 1984–85 UEFA Cup run, he helped Universitatea get past Real Betis before they ultimately fell to Željezničar in the round of 16. He also played in a 3–0 win over AS Monaco in the second leg of the first round of the 1985–86 European Cup Winners' Cup, after losing the first leg 2–0. However, they were eliminated in the following round by the eventual winners of the competition, Dynamo Kyiv. Popescu won another Double with Universitatea in the 1990–91 season, playing 29 league games and scoring once, while serving as the team's captain under coach Sorin Cârțu. He also played the entire match in the 2–1 victory against FC Bacău in the Cupa României final.

In 1992, Popescu joined Swiss club Locarno. Three years later, he returned to Romania to make a comeback with Universitatea Craiova. He made his last Divizia A appearance on 21 October 1995 in a 1–0 win over AS Bacău, totaling 301 matches with 18 goals in the competition, all of them for Universitatea. Afterwards, Popescu went to play in Divizia B for Electroputere Craiova. In the 1997–98 season, he played for fourth tier club Constructorul Craiova, helping them achieve promotion to Divizia C at the end of the season. Popescu played during the 1998–99 Divizia B season for Politehnica Iași, retiring afterwards.

== International career ==
Popescu played seven matches and scored once for Romania, making his debut on 21 May 1990, when coach Emerich Jenei sent him in the 72nd minute to replace Mircea Rednic in a 1–0 friendly victory against Egypt. He was selected by Jenei to be part of the 1990 World Cup squad, as Miodrag Belodedici, Ștefan Iovan and Dan Petrescu were unavailable, but did not play in a single game there. Subsequently, he played two matches in the Euro 1992 qualifiers, a 1–0 win over Switzerland and a 1–1 draw against Bulgaria, scoring once against the latter. His last appearance for the national team took place on 12 February 1992 in a 1–0 friendly loss to Greece.

== Coaching career ==
After ending his playing career, Popescu worked on several occasions as an assistant coach to Emil Săndoi, starting in 1999 at Universitatea Craiova. Subsequently, they worked together from 2014 to 2016 at Universitatea Craiova and in 2016 at Concordia Chiajna.

== Personal life ==
In 2003, Popescu received the Honorary Citizen of Craiova title.

== Career statistics ==
Appearances and goals by national team and year
National team	Year	Apps	Goals
Romania	1990	1	0
Romania	1991	5	1
Romania	1992	1	0
Total		7	1

Scores and results list Romania's goal tally first, score column indicates score after each Popescu goal.

List of international goals scored by Adrian Popescu
Goal	Date	Venue	Opponent	Score	Result	Competition
1	20 November 1991	Vasil Levski National Stadium, Sofia, Bulgaria	Bulgaria	1–0	1–1	Euro 1992 qualifiers

== Honours ==
Universitatea Craiova

- Divizia A: 1980–81, 1990–91
- Cupa României: 1980–81, 1982–83, 1990–91

Constructorul Craiova

- Divizia D – Dolj County: 1997–98
