= Valdes Pasolini =

Sammarinese footballer

Personal information
- Date of birth: June 3, 1962 (age 64)
- Position: Forward

Senior career*
Years	Team	Apps	(Gls)
1984–2005	Cosmos		

International career
1990–1996	San Marino	14	(1)
- * Club domestic league appearances and goals

Valdes Pasolini (born 3 June 1962) is a retired Sammarinese footballer who played for Cosmos and the San Marino national football team, from whom he played fourteen times between 1990 and 1996, scoring once against Romania. It was the very first goal scored by the San Marino team in an official game.
