= Ivan Matteoni =

Sammarinese footballer

Personal information
- Date of birth: 21 August 1971 (age 55)
- Place of birth: San Marino
- Height: 1.74 m (5 ft 9 in)
- Position: Midfielder

Senior career*
Years	Team	Apps	(Gls)
1990–1991	Sportiva Bagnese		
1991–1994	San Marino Calcio		
1994–1995	S.P. Tre Fiori		
1995–1998	Juvenes Seravalle		
1998–2002	S.P. Tre Fiori		
2002–2003	A.C. Juvenes/Dogana		
2003–2004	S.P. Tre Fiori		
2004–2005	S.S. San Giovanni		
2005–2009	S.P. Tre Penne	4	(0)

International career
1990–2003	San Marino	44	(0)
- * Club domestic league appearances and goals

Ivan Matteoni (born 21 August 1971) is a retired Sammarinese footballer who played as a midfielder.

== International ==
Ivan made 44 caps with the San Marino national football team from 1990 to 2003. He played the last match of his international career against Sweden on 6 September 2003.
