= Stadionul Steaua (1974) =

Former football stadium in Bucharest

Coordinates: 44°24′46.10″N 26°2′25.60″E

- Stadionul Ghencea
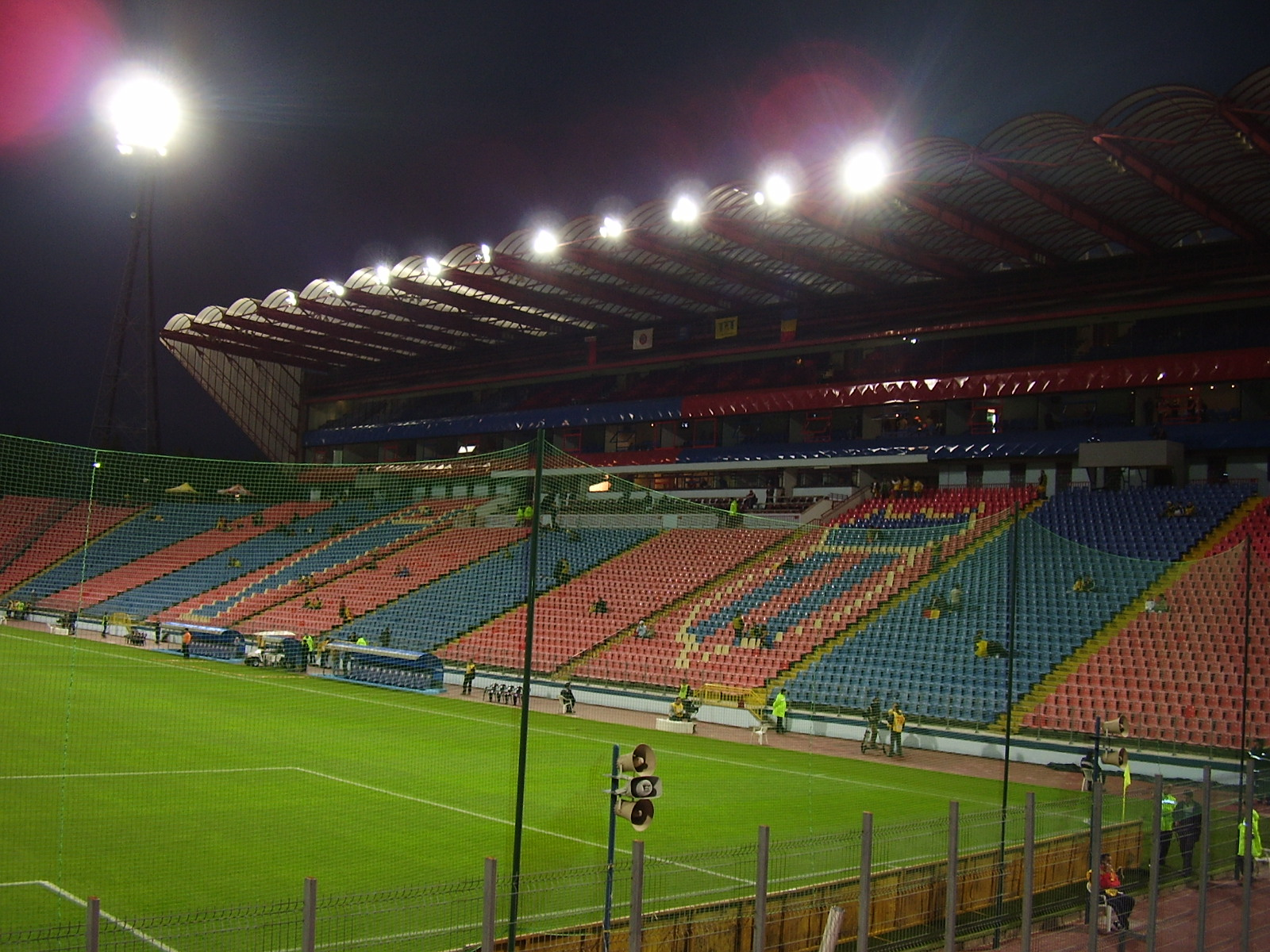
- Stadionul Steaua
- Interactive map of Stadionul Steaua
- Location: 45 Ghencea Blvd., Sector 6, Ghencea, Bucharest, Romania
- Owner: Ministerul Apărării Naționale al României
- Operator: CSA Steaua București (football)
- Capacity: 28,365 (Football)
- Surface: Grass

Construction
- Opened: 9 April 1974
- Renovated: 1996
- Demolished: 2018
- Cost: €20 million
- Architect: Ministerul Apărării Naționale al României

Tenants
- FC Steaua București (1974–2015); Romania national football team (1977–2009); Unirea Urziceni (UCL matches) (2009–2010)

Steaua Stadium (Romanian: Stadionul Steaua), informally also known as Ghencea Stadium, was a football stadium in Bucharest, Romania, which served as the home of FC Steaua București. It was inaugurated on 9 April 1974 when Steaua played a friendly game against OFK Belgrade, 2–2. Gheorghe Tătaru was the first player to score in the stadium.

The stadium was entirely demolished in 2018, and was replaced with a new all-seater stadium opened in 2021.

== History ==
At the time it was one of the first football-only stadiums ever built in Romania, as there are no athletic (track and field) facilities, and the stands are very close to the pitch.

The original capacity was 30,000 on benches, but in 1991 when the plastic seats were installed, the capacity dropped to 28,365, along with 126 press seats, 440 seats in VIP boxes and 733 armchairs. The floodlighting system with a density of 1400 lux was inaugurated in 1991.

The stadium was renovated in 1996 and 2006 in order to host UEFA Champions League. It was renovated again in 2020 for €94.7 million in a project that brought its seating capacity to 31.254.

== Romanian national football team ==
The following national team matches were held in the stadium:

#	Date	Score	Opponent	Competition
1.	23 March 1977	4–0	Turkey	Balkan Cup
2.	16 April 1977	1–0	Spain	Qualification for World Cup 1978
3.	27 April 1977	1–1	East Germany	Friendly match
4.	21 September 1977	6–1	Greece	Friendly match
5.	13 November 1977	4–6	Yugoslavia	Qualification for World Cup 1978
6.	11 October 1978	1–0	Poland	Friendly match
7.	25 October 1978	3–2	Yugoslavia	Qualification for European Championship 1980
8.	21 March 1979	3–0	Greece	Friendly match
9.	24 August 1983	1–0	East Germany	Friendly match
10.	10 September 1986	4–0	Austria	Qualification for European Championship 1988
11.	25 March 1987	5–1	Albania	Qualification for European Championship 1988
12.	29 April 1987	3–1	Spain	Qualification for European Championship 1988
13.	7 October 1987	2–2	Greece	Friendly match
14.	2 November 1988	3–0	Greece	1990 FIFA World Cup qualification
15.	17 May 1989	1–0	Bulgaria	1990 FIFA World Cup qualification
16.	15 November 1989	3–1	Denmark	1990 FIFA World Cup qualification
17.	26 September 1990	2–1	Poland	Friendly match
18.	17 October 1990	0–3	Bulgaria	UEFA Euro 1992 qualifying
19.	5 December 1990	6–0	San Marino	UEFA Euro 1992 qualifying
20.	16 October 1991	1–0	Scotland	UEFA Euro 1992 qualifying
21.	13 November 1991	1–0	Switzerland	UEFA Euro 1992 qualifying
22.	8 April 1992	2–0	Latvia	Friendly match
23.	6 May 1992	7–0	Faroe Islands	1994 FIFA World Cup qualification
24.	20 May 1992	5–1	Wales	1994 FIFA World Cup qualification
25.	14 November 1992	1–1	Czechoslovakia	1994 FIFA World Cup qualification
26.	14 April 1993	2–1	Cyprus	1994 FIFA World Cup qualification
27.	22 September 1993	1–0	Israel	Friendly match
28.	13 October 1993	2–1	Belgium	1994 FIFA World Cup qualification
29.	20 April 1994	2–0	Bolivia	Friendly match
30.	25 May 1994	2–0	Nigeria	Friendly match
31.	1 June 1994	0–0	Slovenia	Friendly match
32.	7 September 1994	3–0	Azerbaijan	UEFA Euro 1996 qualifying
33.	12 November 1994	3–2	Slovakia	UEFA Euro 1996 qualifying
34.	29 March 1995	2–1	Poland	UEFA Euro 1996 qualifying
35.	7 June 1995	2–1	Israel	UEFA Euro 1996 qualifying
36.	11 October 1995	1–3	France	UEFA Euro 1996 qualifying
37.	24 April 1996	5–0	Georgia	Friendly match
38.	1 June 1996	3–1	Moldova	Friendly match
39.	14 August 1996	2–0	Israel	Friendly match
40.	31 August 1996	3–0	Lithuania	1998 FIFA World Cup qualification
41.	29 March 1997	8–0	Liechtenstein	1998 FIFA World Cup qualification
42.	30 April 1997	1–0	Republic of Ireland	1998 FIFA World Cup qualification
43.	20 August 1997	4–2	Macedonia	1998 FIFA World Cup qualification
44.	10 September 1997	4–0	Iceland	1998 FIFA World Cup qualification
45.	18 March 1998	0–1	Israel	Friendly match
46.	3 June 1998	3–2	Paraguay	Friendly match
47.	2 September 1998	7–0	Liechtenstein	UEFA Euro 2000 qualifying
48.	28 April 1999	1–0	Belgium	Friendly match
49.	5 June 1999	2–0	Hungary	UEFA Euro 2000 qualifying
50.	9 June 1999	4–0	Azerbaijan	UEFA Euro 2000 qualifying
51.	8 September 1999	1–1	Portugal	UEFA Euro 2000 qualifying
52.	31 May 2000	2–1	Greece	Friendly match
53.	3 September 2000	1–0	Lithuania	2002 FIFA World Cup qualification
54.	15 November 2000	2–1	FR Yugoslavia	Friendly match
55.	24 March 2001	0–2	Italy	2002 FIFA World Cup qualification
56.	5 September 2001	2–0	Hungary	2002 FIFA World Cup qualification
57.	6 October 2001	1–1	Georgia	2002 FIFA World Cup qualification
58.	14 November 2001	1–1	Slovenia	2002 FIFA World Cup Play-off, 2nd Leg
59.	12 October 2002	0–1	Norway	UEFA Euro 2004 qualifying
60.	16 November 2005	3–0	Nigeria	Friendly match
61.	7 October 2006	3–1	Belarus	UEFA Euro 2008 qualifying
62.	26 March 2008	3–0	Russia	Friendly match
63.	31 May 2008	4–0	Montenegro	Friendly match
64.	11 February 2009	1–2	Croatia	Friendly match
65.	9 September 2009	1–1	Austria	2010 FIFA World Cup qualification

== Important matches ==
Date	Match	Result	Notes
09-04-1974	Steaua–Belgrade	2–2	A friendly game, the first ever played on Ghencea Stadium.
28-04-1974	Steaua–Brașov	2–2	First official match played on Ghencea Stadium.
23-03-1977	Romania–Turkey	4–0	A Balcanic Cup game. The first game played by Romania on Ghencea Stadium.
03-10-1979	Steaua–Young Boys	6–0	Steaua's largest win in European Cups.
16-04-1986	Steaua–Anderlecht	3–0	European Cup semifinal. Following this win, Steaua qualified for the European Cup final.
06-04-1988	Steaua–Benfica	0–0	European Cup semifinal.
07-12-1988	Steaua–Corvinul	11–0	Steaua's largest win in Liga I.
15-03-1989	Steaua–Göteborg	5–1	European Cup quarter-finals.
05-04-1989	Steaua–Galatasaray	4–0	European Cup semifinal. An important win for Steaua which virtually opened the door to the European Cup final.
15-11-1989	Romania–Denmark	3–1	Following this win, Romania qualified to 1990 FIFA World Cup, the first World Cup Romania attended in twenty years.
01-09-1991	Steaua–Brăila	2–0	A Divizia A game, in which occasion the floodlight installation was inaugurated.
13-09-1995	Steaua–Rangers	1–0	First match won in UEFA Champions League new format.
04-04-1998	Steaua–Dinamo	5–0	A Divizia A game, Steaua's second largest win against Dinamo.
31-05-1998	Greece U21–Spain U21	0–1	A 1998 UEFA European Under-21 Football Championship Final.
25-02-2005	Steaua–Valencia	2–0	Steaua won 4–3 on penalty shootout, and thus Steaua qualified for the Round of 16 of the UEFA Cup. Many consider this game, the most important win of the past 15 years, marking the beginning of "a new era" for the Romanian side.
07-04-2007	Steaua–Dinamo	2–4	A Divizia A game, in which occasion the new scoreboard was inaugurated.
24-11-2009	Urziceni–Sevilla	1–0	A UEFA Champions League game. First home victory for a Romanian team in the Champions League after 13 years.

== Photo gallery ==
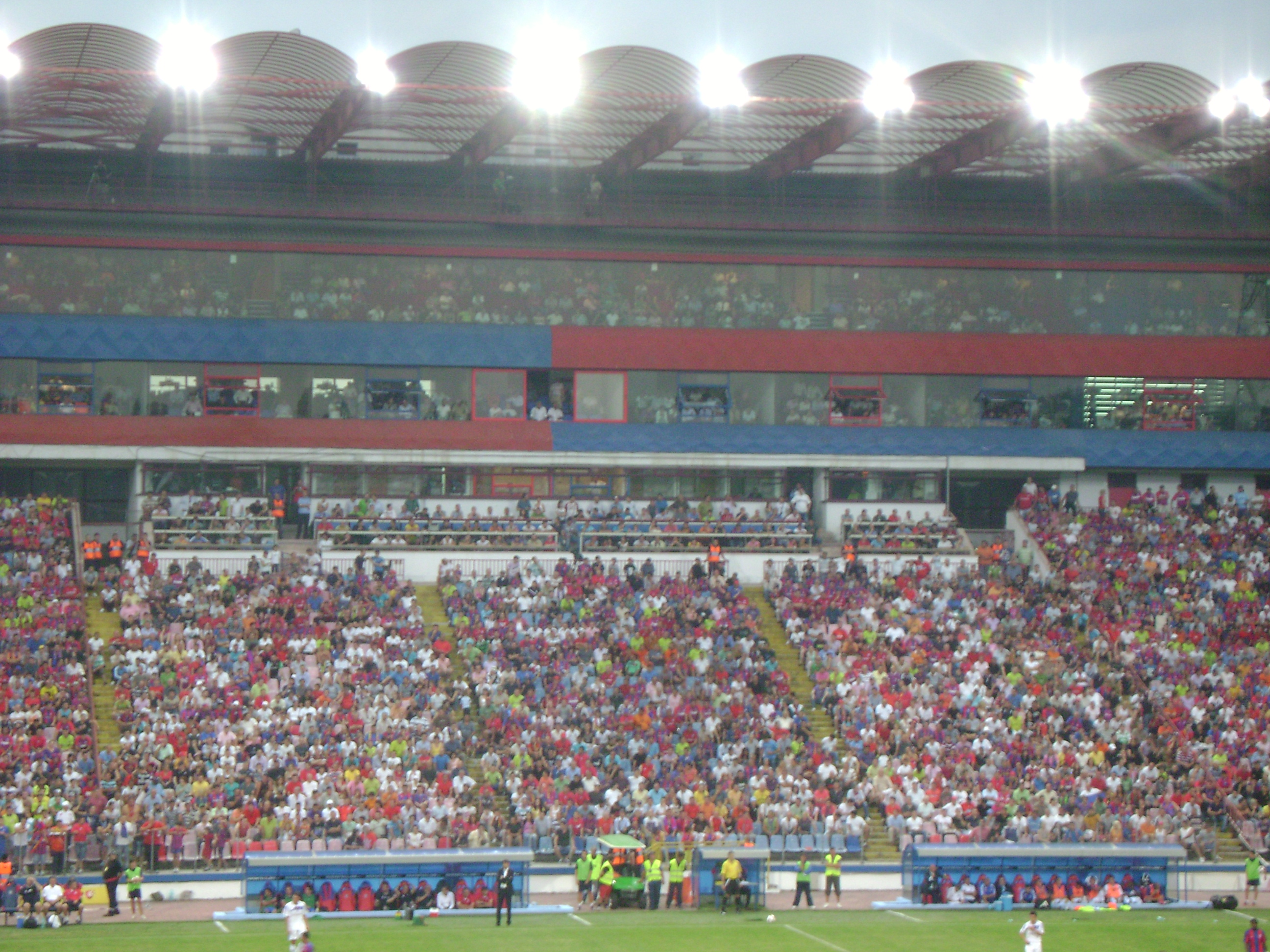
Official Stand in 2010

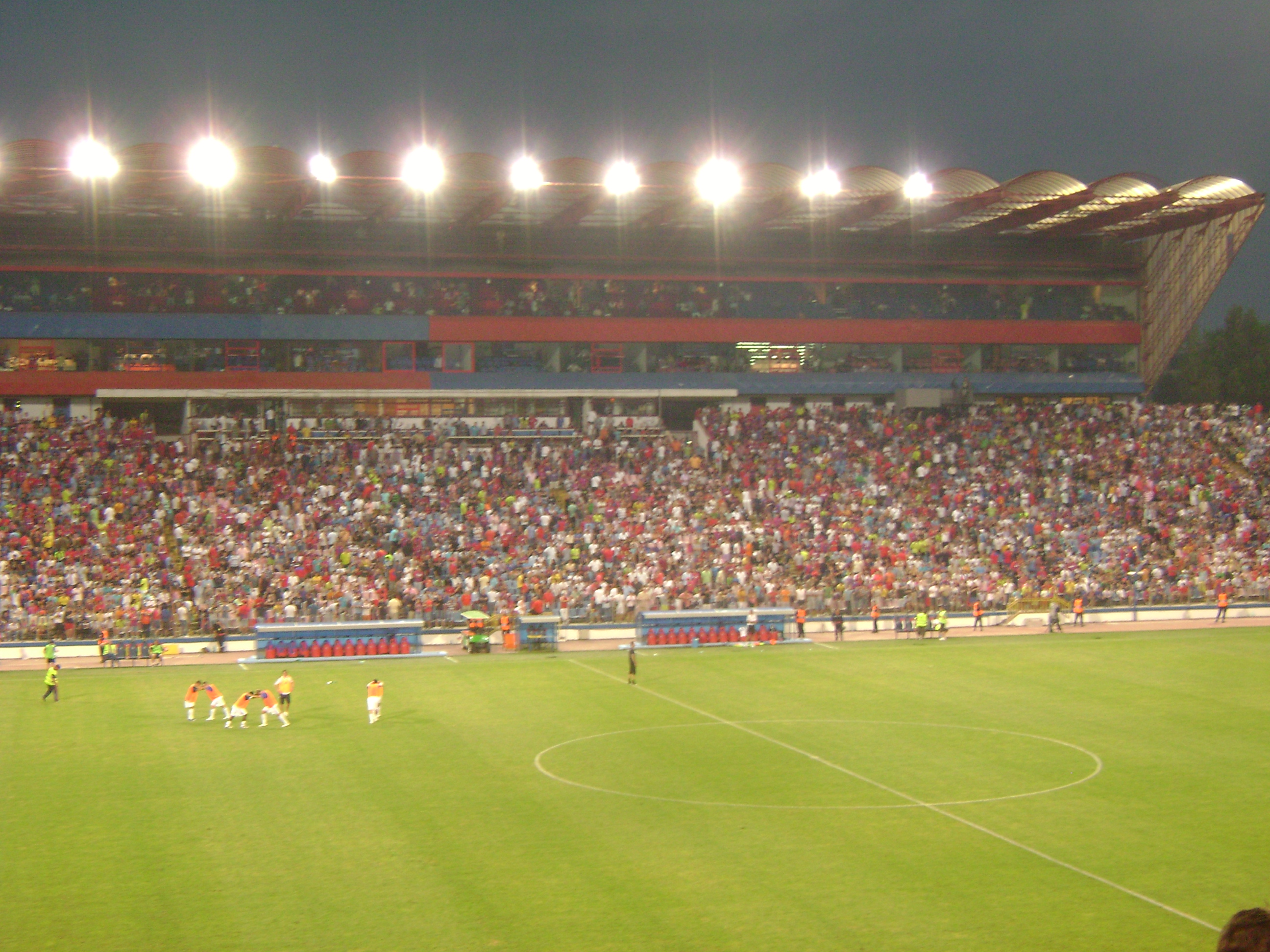
Half-time at Ghencea

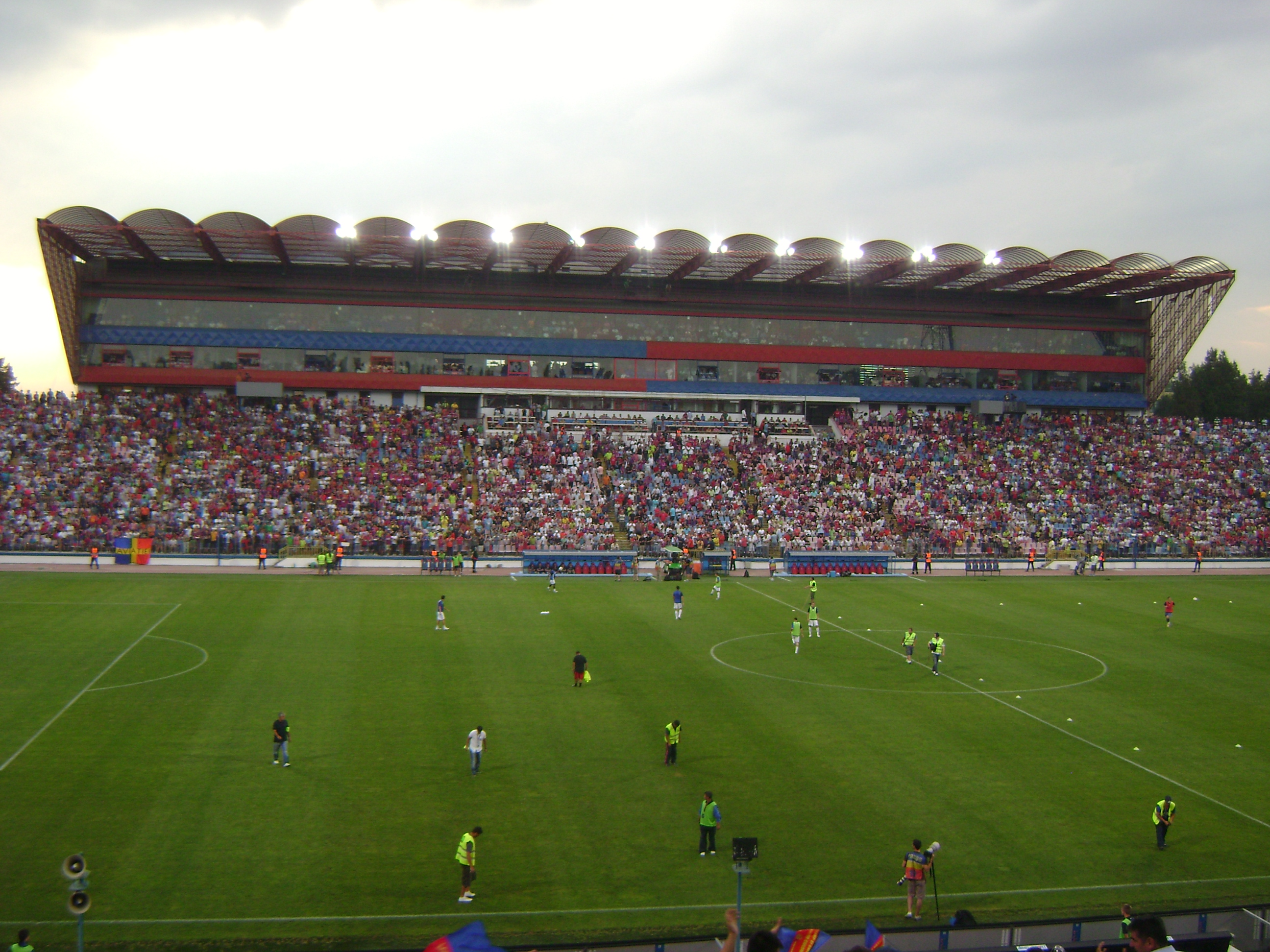
Steaua vs. U Craiova

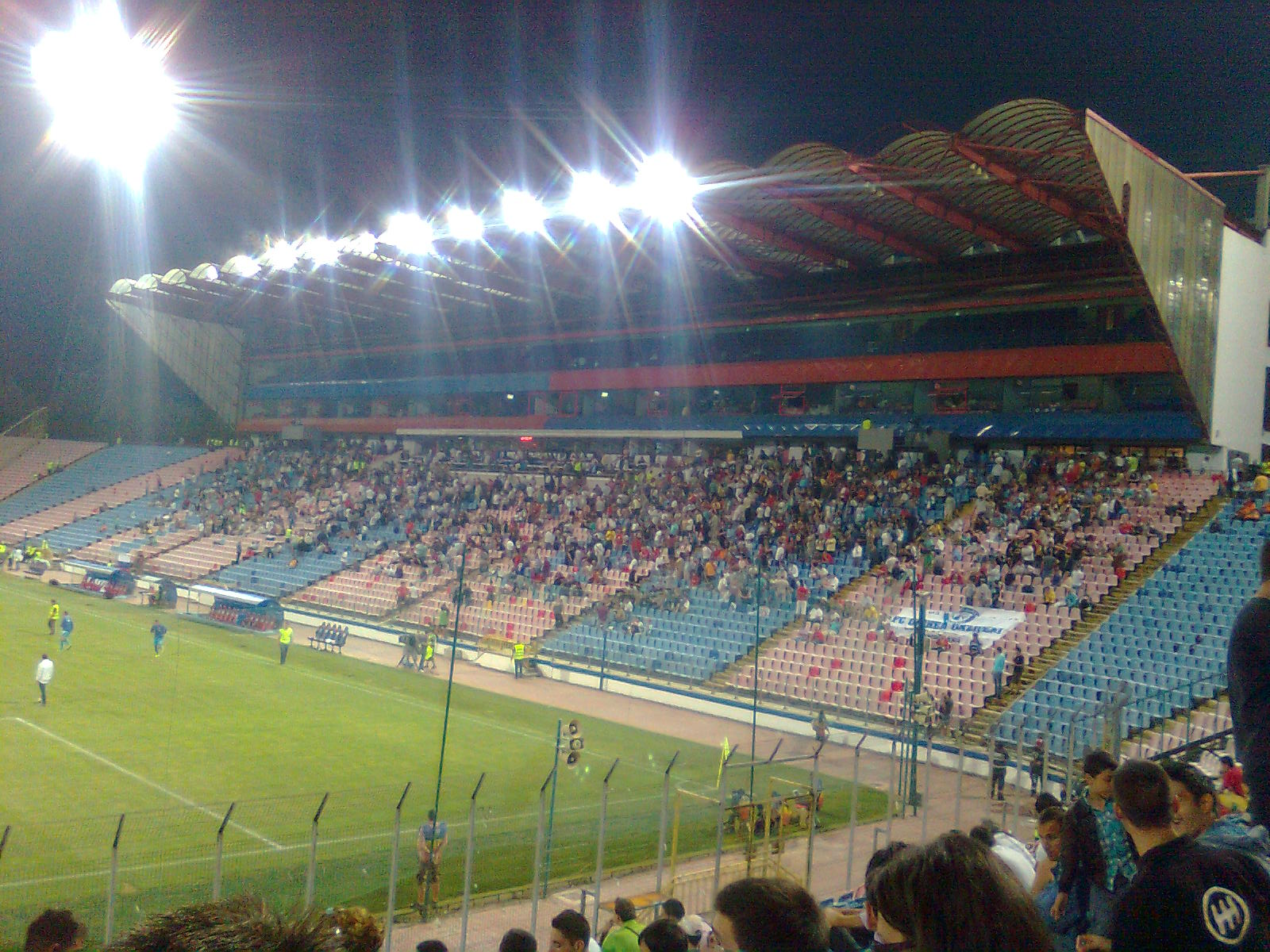
Unirea Urziceni in Champions League

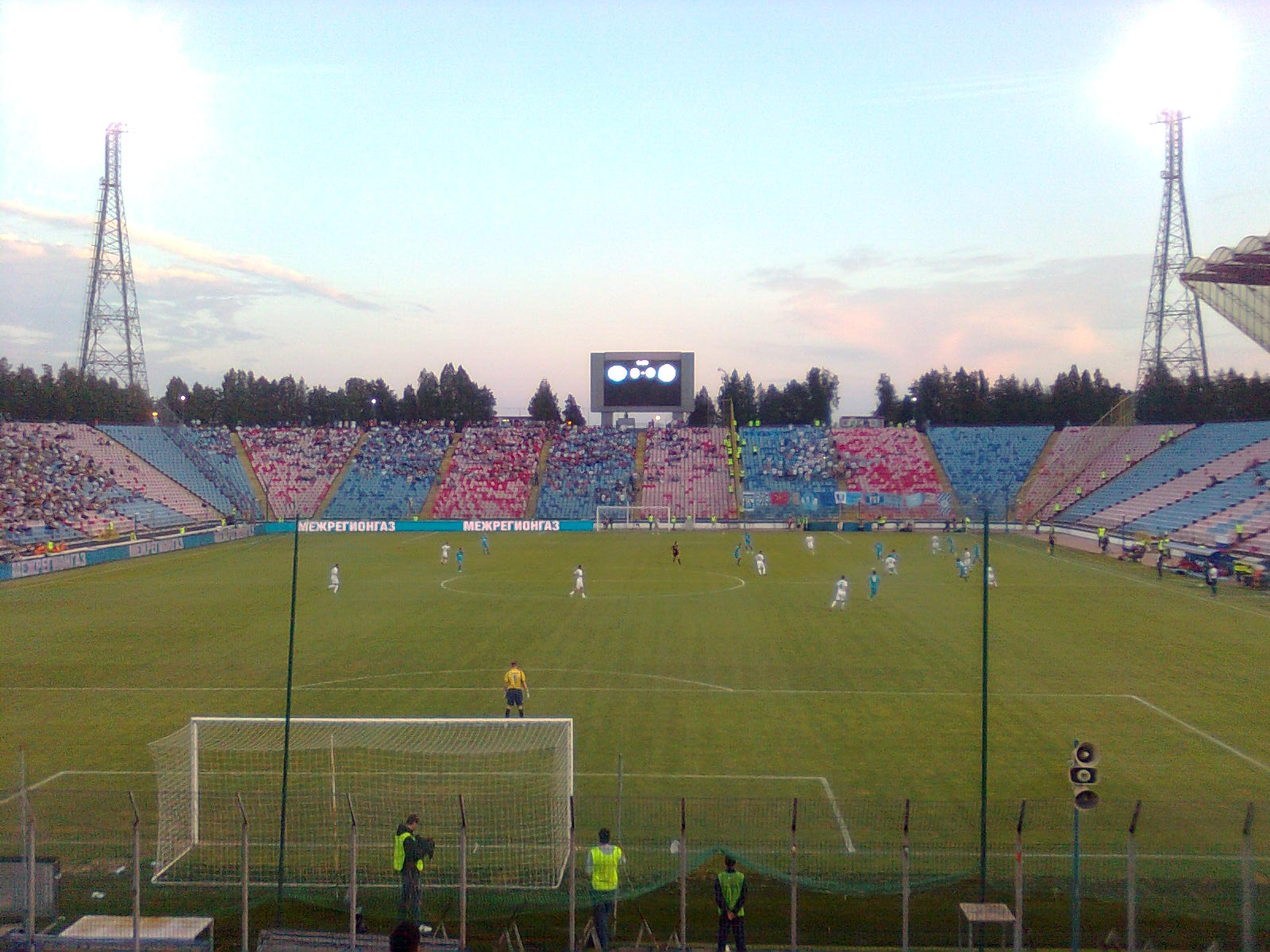
Unirea Urziceni vs. Zenit Sankt Petersburg

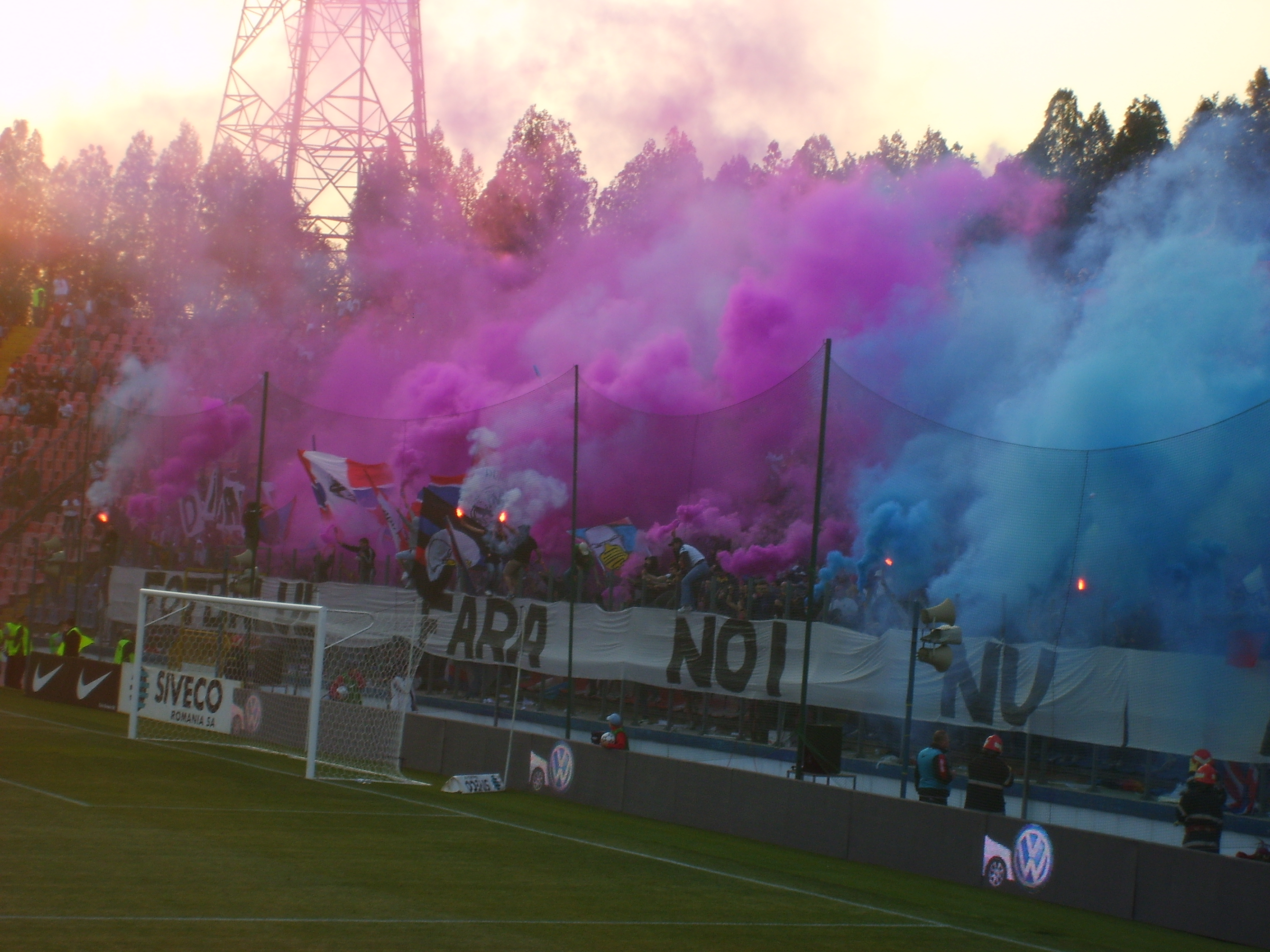
Steaua vs. Dinamo

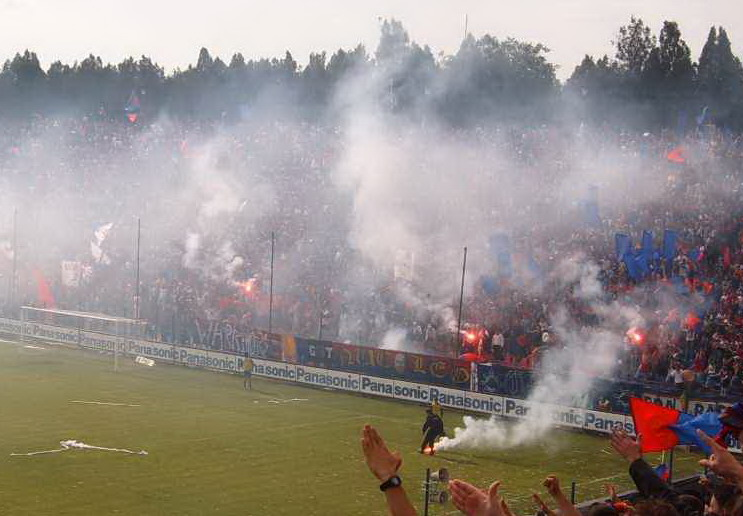
Steaua fans at Ghencea

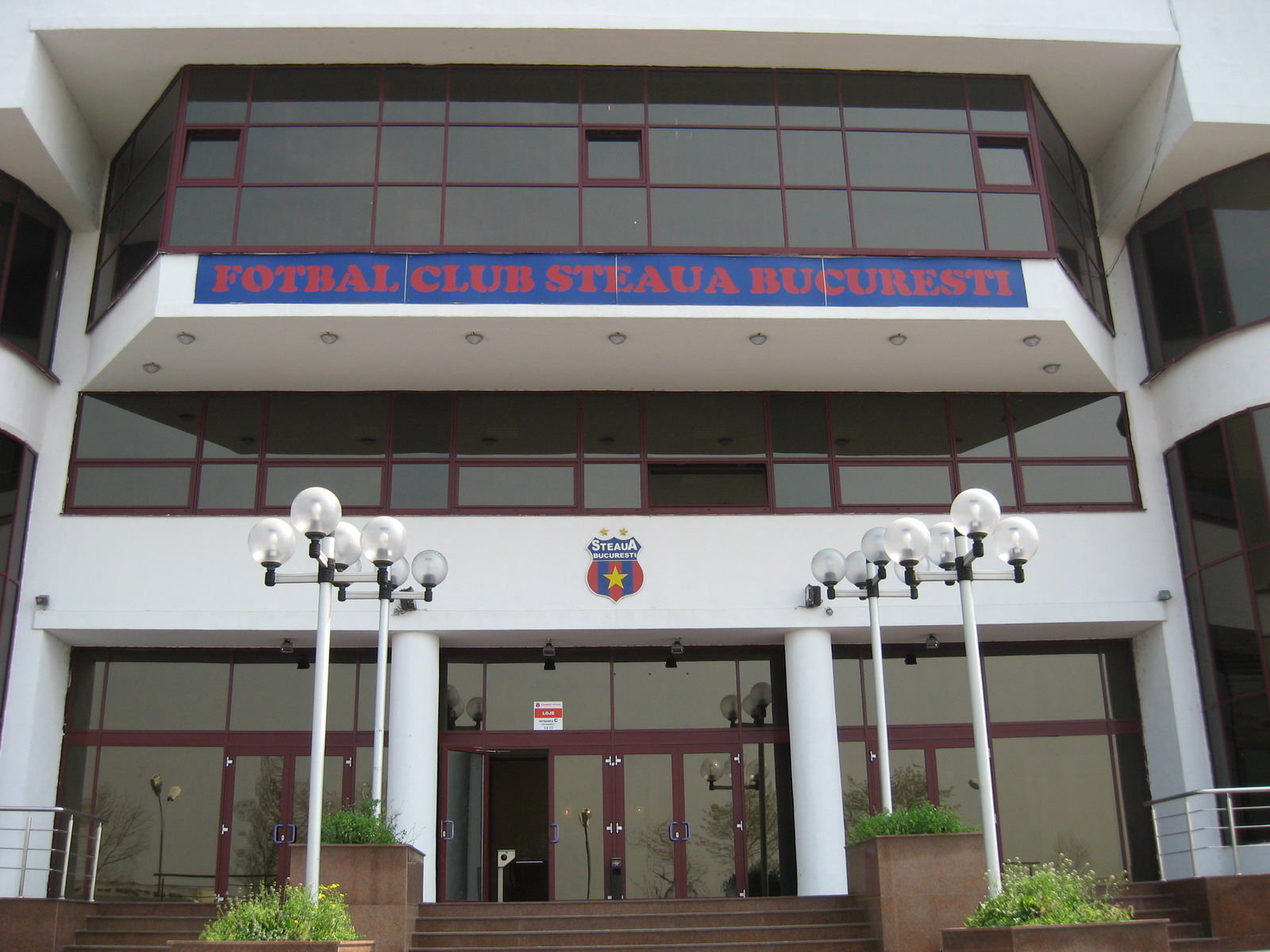
Stadium main entrance

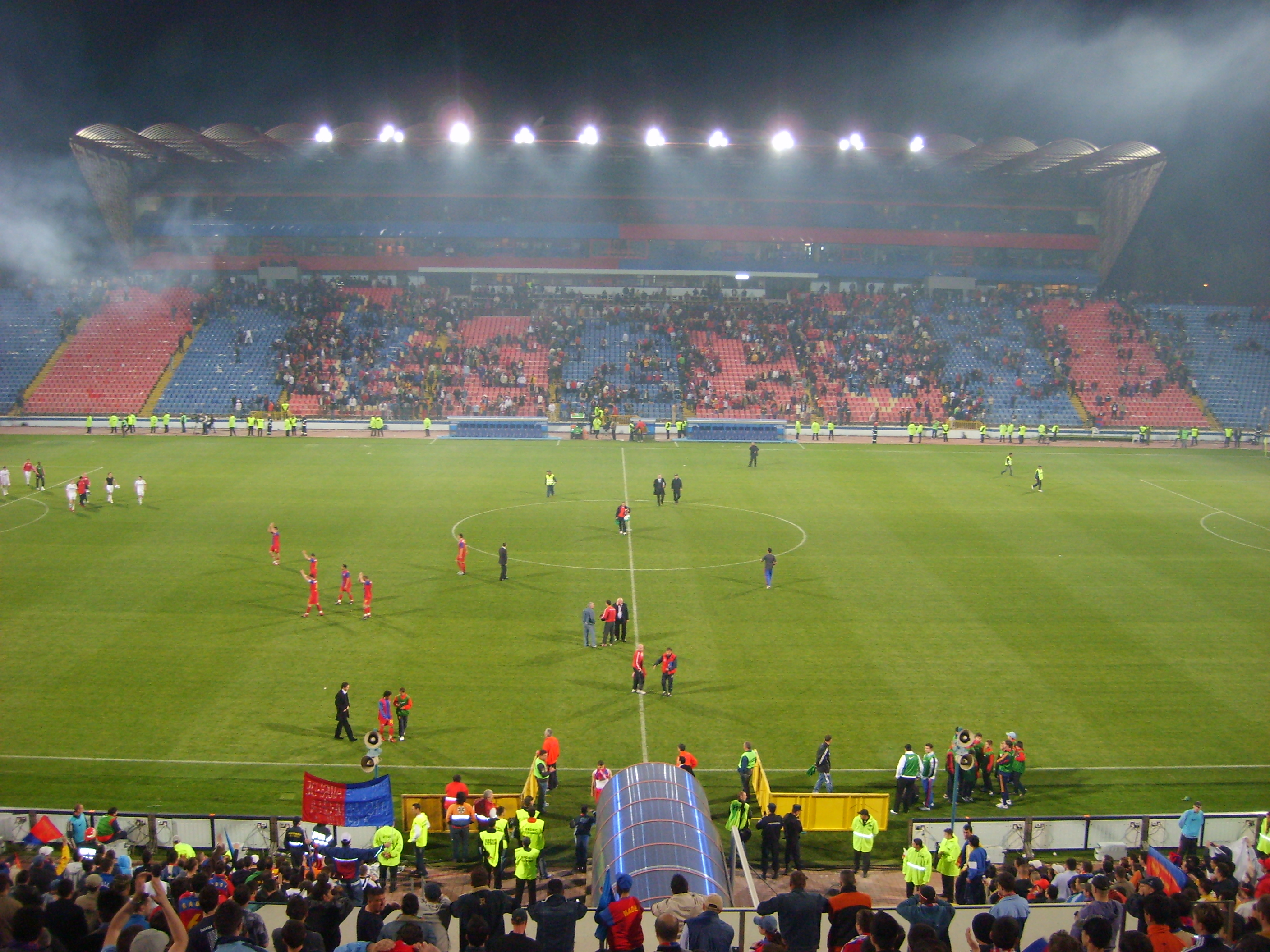
Stadionul Ghencea in 2007
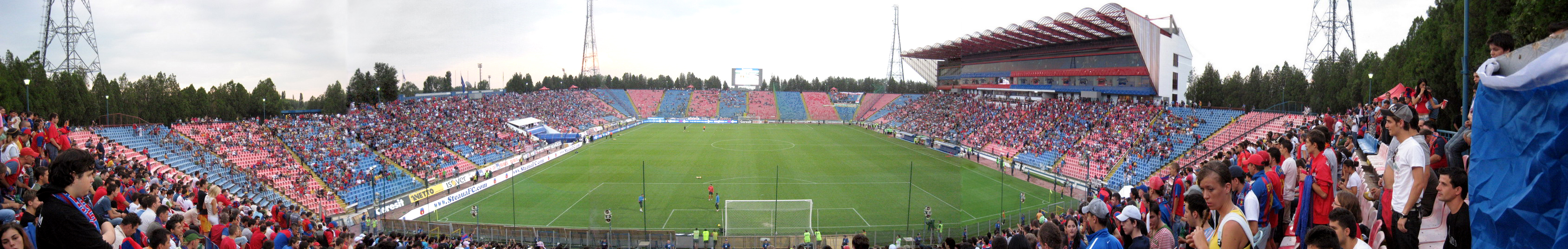
A panorama of Stadionul Ghencea as seen from Peluza Nord in 2007

== See also ==
- List of football stadiums in Romania

Preceded by Barcelona	1998 UEFA European Under-21 Championship; Final Venue; 1998	Succeeded by Bratislava
