= Republic of Ireland national football team results (1980–1989) =

- Win Draw Loss

This article contains the results of the Republic of Ireland national football team during the 1980s.

== Results ==
=== 1980 ===
6 February 1980 UEFA Euro 1980 qualifying Group 1	England	2–0	Republic of Ireland	London, England
	Keegan 34', 74'	Report		Stadium: Wembley Stadium; Attendance: 91,043; Referee: Scheurell (East Germany)

26 March 1980 1982 FIFA World Cup qualification Group 2	Cyprus	2–3	Republic of Ireland	Nicosia, Cyprus
	Pantziaras 29'; Kaiafas 74' (pen.)	Report	McGee 8', 38'; Lawrenson 23'	Stadium: Makario Stadium; Attendance: 10,000; Referee: Sharir (Israel)

30 April 1980 Friendly	Republic of Ireland	2–0	Switzerland	Dublin, Ireland
	Givens 12'; Daly 41'	Report		Stadium: Lansdowne Road; Attendance: 15,000; Referee: Thomas (Wales)

16 May 1980 Friendly	Republic of Ireland	0–1	Argentina	Dublin, Ireland
		Report	Valencia 28'	Stadium: Lansdowne Road; Attendance: 30,100; Referee: Courtney (England)

10 September 1980 1982 FIFA World Cup qualification Group 2	Republic of Ireland	2–1	Netherlands	Dublin, Ireland
	Daly 78'; Lawrenson 85'	Report	Tahamata 57'	Stadium: Lansdowne Road; Attendance: 25,000; Referee: Lund-Sørensen (Denmark)

15 October 1980 1982 FIFA World Cup qualification Group 2	Republic of Ireland	1–1	Belgium	Dublin, Ireland
	Grealish 42'	Report	Cluytens 13'	Stadium: Lansdowne Road; Attendance: 40,000; Referee: Rolles (Luxembourg)

28 October 1980 1982 FIFA World Cup qualification Group 2	France	2–0	Republic of Ireland	Paris, France
	Platini 11'; Zimako 77'	Report		Stadium: Parc des Princes; Attendance: 44,800; Referee: Castillo (France)

19 November 1980 1982 FIFA World Cup qualification Group 2	Republic of Ireland	6–0	Cyprus	Dublin, Ireland
	Daly 10' (pen.), 23'; Grealish 24'; Robinson 28'; Stapleton 46'; Hughton 65'	Report		Stadium: Lansdowne Road; Attendance: 25,000; Referee: Guðmundsson (Iceland)

=== 1981 ===
24 February 1981 Friendly	Republic of Ireland	1–3	Wales	Dublin, Ireland
	Grealish 25'	Report	Price 34'; Boyle 38'; Yorath 89'	Stadium: Tolka Park; Attendance: 15,000; Referee: Reeves (England)

25 March 1981 1982 FIFA World Cup qualification Group 2	Belgium	1–0	Republic of Ireland	Brussels, Belgium
	Ceulemans 88'	Report		Stadium: Stade du Heysel; Attendance: 37,978; Referee: Nazare (Portugal)

29 April 1981 Friendly	Republic of Ireland	3–1	Czechoslovakia	Dublin, Ireland
19:00 UTC+1	Moran 18', 69'; Stapleton 75'	Report	Masný 55'	Stadium: Lansdowne Road; Attendance: 8,000; Referee: Grey (England)

21 May 1981 Friendly	West Germany B	3–0	Republic of Ireland	Bremen, West Germany
	Del'Haye 50'; Funkel 62'; Schröder 64'	Report		Stadium: Weserstadion; Attendance: 4,000; Referee: Frickmann (Denmark)

23 May 1981 Friendly	Poland	3–0	Republic of Ireland	Bydgoszcz, Poland
	Iwan 2'; O'Leary 38' (o.g.); Ogaza 66'	Report		Stadium: Zawisza; Attendance: 15,000; Referee: Tătar (Romania)

9 September 1981 1982 FIFA World Cup qualification Group 2	Netherlands	2–2	Republic of Ireland	Rotterdam, Netherlands
	Thijssen 11'; Mühren 64' (pen.)	Report	Robinson 40'; Stapleton 71'	Stadium: De Kuip; Attendance: 48,000; Referee: Christov (Czechoslovakia)

14 October 1981 1982 FIFA World Cup qualification Group 2	Republic of Ireland	3–2	France	Dublin, Ireland
	Mahut 3' (o.g.); Stapleton 23'; Robinson 39'	Report	Bellone 9'; Platini 83'	Stadium: Lansdowne Road; Attendance: 55,000; Referee: Eriksson (Sweden)

=== 1982 ===
28 April 1982 Friendly	Algeria	2–0	Republic of Ireland	Algiers, Algeria
	Assad 15'; Madjer 64'	Report		Stadium: Olympic Stadium; Attendance: 65,000; Referee: Lambert (France)

22 May 1982 Friendly	Chile	1–0	Republic of Ireland	Santiago, Chile
	Gamboa 1'	Report		Stadium: Estadio Nacional; Attendance: 16,000; Referee: Ojeda (Chile)

27 May 1982 Friendly	Brazil	7–0	Republic of Ireland	Uberlândia, Brazil
	Falcão 32'; Sócrates 53', 73'; Serginho 64', 75'; Luizinho 68'; Zico 78'	Report		Stadium: Estádio Parque do Sabiá; Attendance: 72,733; Referee: Filho (Brazil)

30 May 1982 Friendly	Trinidad and Tobago	2–1	Republic of Ireland	Port of Spain, Trinidad and Tobago
	Nelson; Haynes	Report	Brady	Stadium: Arima Stadium; Attendance: 6,000
Note: It has been subsequently claimed by manager Eoin Hand that the Republic of Ireland actually lost 1–2 to a local club side on 30 May, then defeated Trinidad and Tobago 3–0 on 3 June, but the Trinidad and Tobago Football Association swapped around the results so that the first game was the "official" international and the second game reclassified as a friendly. In the absence of any media reports or FAI officials, there was no-one to gainsay them

22 September 1982 UEFA Euro 1984 qualifying Group 7	Netherlands	2–1	Republic of Ireland	Rotterdam, Netherlands
	Schoenaker 1'; Gullit 64'	Report	Daly 79'	Stadium: De Kuip; Attendance: 20,500; Referee: Gregr (Czechoslovakia)

13 October 1982 UEFA Euro 1984 qualifying Group 7	Republic of Ireland	2–0	Iceland	Dublin, Ireland
	Stapleton 36'; Grealish 75'	Report		Stadium: Lansdowne Road; Attendance: 23,371; Referee: Rion (Belgium)

17 November 1982 UEFA Euro 1984 qualifying Group 7	Republic of Ireland	3–3	Spain	Dublin, Ireland
	Grimes 2'; Stapleton 64', 76'	Report	Maceda 31'; Martin 47' (o.g.); Muñoz 60'	Stadium: Lansdowne Road; Attendance: 35,000; Referee: Redelfs (West Germany)

=== 1983 ===
30 March 1983 UEFA Euro 1984 qualifying Group 7	Malta	0–1	Republic of Ireland	Ta'Qali, Malta
		Report	Stapleton 89'	Stadium: National Stadium; Attendance: 6,487; Referee: Mathias (Austria)

27 April 1983 UEFA Euro 1984 qualifying Group 7	Spain	2–0	Republic of Ireland	Zaragoza, Spain
	Santillana 49'; Rincón 89'	Report		Stadium: Estadio La Romareda; Attendance: 45,000; Referee: Butenko (Soviet Union)

21 September 1983 UEFA Euro 1984 qualifying Group 7	Iceland	0–3	Republic of Ireland	Reykjavík, Iceland
		Report	Waddock 16'; Robinson 21'; Walsh 81'	Stadium: Laugardalsvöllur; Attendance: 13,706; Referee: Biguet (France)

12 October 1983 UEFA Euro 1984 qualifying Group 7	Republic of Ireland	2–3	Netherlands	Dublin, Ireland
	Waddock 7'; Brady 35' (pen.)	Report	Gullit 51', 75' van Basten 65'	Stadium: Dalymount Park; Attendance: 28,000; Referee: Daina (Switzerland)

16 November 1983 UEFA Euro 1984 qualifying Group 7	Republic of Ireland	8–0	Malta	Dublin, Ireland
	Lawrenson 25', 63'; Stapleton 28' (pen.); O'Callaghan 35'; Sheedy 74'; Brady 76', 88'; Daly 86'	Report		Stadium: Dalymount Park; Attendance: 11,000; Referee: Amundsen (Denmark)

=== 1984 ===
4 April 1984 Friendly	Israel	3–0	Republic of Ireland	Tel Aviv, Israel
	Ohana 3'; Armeli 62'; Sinai 65'	Report		Stadium: Bloomfield Stadium; Attendance: 10,000; Referee: Lartigot (France)

23 May 1984 Friendly	Republic of Ireland	0–0	Poland	Dublin, Ireland
		Report		Stadium: Dalymount Park; Attendance: 8,000; Referee: Courtney (England)

3 June 1984 1984 Japan Cup	China	0–1	Republic of Ireland	Sapporo, Japan
		Report	O'Keefe 57'	Stadium: Maruyama Stadium

8 August 1984 Friendly	Republic of Ireland	0–0	Mexico	Dublin, Ireland
		Report		Stadium: Dalymount Park; Attendance: 5,100; Referee: Baumann (Switzerland)

12 September 1984 1986 FIFA World Cup qualification Group 6	Republic of Ireland	1–0	Soviet Union	Dublin, Ireland
	Walsh 64'	Report		Stadium: Lansdowne Road; Attendance: 45,000; Referee: Keizer (Netherlands)

17 October 1984 1986 FIFA World Cup qualification Group 6	Norway	1–0	Republic of Ireland	Oslo, Norway
	Jacobsen 42'	Report		Stadium: Ullevaal; Attendance: 15,379; Referee: Scheurell (East Germany)

14 November 1984 1986 FIFA World Cup qualification Group 6	Denmark	3–0	Republic of Ireland	Copenhagen, Denmark
	Elkjær 30', 46'; Lerby 55'	Report		Stadium: Idrætsparken; Attendance: 45,300; Referee: Würtz (France)

=== 1985 ===
5 February 1985 Friendly	Republic of Ireland	1–2	Italy	Dublin, Ireland
	Waddock 53'	Report	Rossi 5' (pen.); Altobelli 18'	Stadium: Dalymount Park; Attendance: 40,000; Referee: Keizer (Netherlands)

27 February 1985 Friendly	Israel	0–0	Republic of Ireland	Ramat Gan, Israel
		Report		Stadium: Ramat Gan Stadium; Attendance: 3,000; Referee: d'Elia (Italy)

26 March 1985 Friendly	England	2–1	Republic of Ireland	London, England
	Steven 45'; Lineker 76'	Report	Brady 88'	Stadium: Wembley Stadium; Attendance: 34,793; Referee: Smith (Scotland)

1 May 1985 1986 FIFA World Cup qualification Group 6	Republic of Ireland	0–0	Norway	Dublin, Ireland
		Report		Stadium: Lansdowne Road; Attendance: 18,500; Referee: Németh (Hungary)

26 May 1985 Friendly	Republic of Ireland	0–0	Spain	Cork, Ireland
		Report		Stadium: Flower Lodge; Attendance: 15,000; Referee: Gächter (Switzerland)

2 June 1985 1986 FIFA World Cup qualification Group 6	Republic of Ireland	3–0	Switzerland	Dublin, Ireland
	Stapleton 7'; Grealish 33'; Sheedy 57'	Report		Stadium: Lansdowne Road; Attendance: 17,300; Referee: Bergamo (Italy)

11 September 1985 1986 FIFA World Cup qualification Group 6	Switzerland	0–0	Republic of Ireland	Bern, Switzerland
		Report		Stadium: Wankdorf Stadion; Attendance: 24,000; Referee: Aladrén (Spain)

16 October 1985 1986 FIFA World Cup qualification Group 6	Soviet Union	2–0	Republic of Ireland	Moscow, Soviet Union
	Cherenkov 61'; Protasov 90'	Report		Stadium: Lenin Stadium; Attendance: 100,000; Referee: Casarin (Italy)

13 November 1985 1986 FIFA World Cup qualification Group 6	Republic of Ireland	1–4	Denmark	Dublin, Ireland
	Stapleton 6'	Report	Elkjær 7', 76'; Laudrup 49'; Sivebæk 57'	Stadium: Lansdowne Road; Attendance: 12,000; Referee: Wöhrer (Austria)

=== 1986 ===
26 March 1986 Friendly	Republic of Ireland	0–1	Wales	Dublin, Ireland
		Report	Rush 17'	Stadium: Lansdowne Road; Attendance: 16,500; Referee: Hope (Scotland)

23 April 1986 Friendly	Republic of Ireland	1–1	Uruguay	Dublin, Ireland
	Daly 38' (pen.)	Report	Paz 22'	Stadium: Lansdowne Road; Attendance: 14,000; Referee: Martin (England)

25 May 1986 Iceland Triangular Tournament	Iceland	1–2	Republic of Ireland	Reykjavík, Iceland
19:00 UTC+0	Guðjohnsen 40'	Report	McGrath 34'; Daly 84'	Stadium: Laugardalsvöllur; Attendance: 4,246; Referee: Worrall (England)

27 May 1986 Iceland Triangular Tournament	Czechoslovakia	0–1	Republic of Ireland	Reykjavík, Iceland
19:00 UTC+0		Report	Stapleton 82'	Stadium: Laugardalsvöllur; Attendance: 1,000; Referee: Olsen (Iceland)

10 September 1986 UEFA Euro 1988 qualifying Group 7	Belgium	2–2	Republic of Ireland	Brussels, Belgium
	Claesen 14'; Scifo 71'	Report	Stapleton 18'; Brady 89' (pen.)	Stadium: Constant Vanden Stock; Attendance: 22,212; Referee: Igna (Romania)

15 October 1986 UEFA Euro 1988 qualifying Group 7	Republic of Ireland	0–0	Scotland	Dublin, Ireland
		Report		Stadium: Lansdowne Road; Attendance: 49,000; Referee: Halle (Norway)

12 November 1986 Friendly	Poland	1–0	Republic of Ireland	Warsaw, Poland
	Koniarek 43'	Report		Stadium: Stadion Wojska Polskiego; Attendance: 8,000; Referee: Németh (Hungary)

=== 1987 ===
18 February 1987 UEFA Euro 1988 qualifying Group 7	Scotland	0–1	Republic of Ireland	Glasgow, Scotland
		Report	Lawrenson 8'	Stadium: Hampden Park; Attendance: 45,081; Referee: van Ettekoven (Netherlands)

1 April 1987 UEFA Euro 1988 qualifying Group 7	Bulgaria	2–1	Republic of Ireland	Sofia, Bulgaria
	Sadkov 41'; Tanev 81' (pen.)	Report	Stapleton 53'	Stadium: Vasil Levski; Attendance: 35,247; Referee: Da Silva Valente (Portugal)

29 April 1987 UEFA Euro 1988 qualifying Group 7	Republic of Ireland	0–0	Belgium	Dublin, Ireland
		Report		Stadium: Lansdowne Road; Attendance: 49,000; Referee: Holzmann (Austria)

23 May 1987 Friendly	Republic of Ireland	1–0	Brazil	Dublin, Ireland
	Brady 30'	Report		Stadium: Lansdowne Road; Attendance: 18,000; Referee: Sandoz (Austria)

28 May 1987 UEFA Euro 1988 qualifying Group 7	Luxembourg	0–2	Republic of Ireland	Luxembourg, Luxembourg
		Report	Galvin 44'; Whelan 64'	Stadium: Stade Josy Barthel; Attendance: 4,965; Referee: Peduzzi (Switzerland)

9 September 1987 UEFA Euro 1988 qualifying Group 7	Republic of Ireland	2–1	Luxembourg	Dublin, Ireland
	Stapleton 31'; McGrath 74'	Report	Krings 29'	Stadium: Lansdowne Road; Attendance: 18,000; Referee: Cooper (Wales)

14 October 1987 UEFA Euro 1988 qualifying Group 7	Republic of Ireland	2–0	Bulgaria	Dublin, Ireland
	McGrath 52'; Moran 83'	Report		Stadium: Lansdowne Road; Attendance: 26,000; Referee: Keizer (Netherlands)

10 November 1987 Friendly	Republic of Ireland	5–0	Israel	Dublin, Ireland
	John Byrne 25'; David Kelly 46', 56', 71' (pen.); Quinn 83'	Report		Stadium: Lansdowne Road; Attendance: 9,500; Referee: Midgley (England)

=== 1988 ===
23 March 1988 Friendly	Republic of Ireland	2–0	Romania	Dublin, Ireland
	Moran 30'; David Kelly 90'	Report		Stadium: Lansdowne Road; Attendance: 30,000; Referee: Martin (England)

27 April 1988 Friendly	Republic of Ireland	2–0	Yugoslavia	Dublin, Ireland
	McCarthy 24'; Moran 65'	Report		Stadium: Lansdowne Road; Attendance: 12,000; Referee: Smith (Scotland)

22 May 1988 Friendly	Republic of Ireland	3–1	Poland	Dublin, Ireland
	Sheedy 12'; Cascarino 31'; Sheridan 40'	Report	Warzycha 65'	Stadium: Lansdowne Road; Attendance: 18,500; Referee: Roberts (Wales)

1 June 1988 Friendly	Norway	0–0	Republic of Ireland	Oslo, Norway
		Report		Stadium: Ullevaal; Attendance: 9,494; Referee: Lund-Sørensen (Denmark)

12 June 1988 UEFA Euro 1988 Group 2	England	0–1	Republic of Ireland	Stuttgart, Germany
15:30 UTC+2		Report	Houghton 6'	Stadium: Neckarstadion; Attendance: 51,573; Referee: Kirschen (East Germany)

15 June 1988 UEFA Euro 1988 Group 2	Republic of Ireland	1–1	Soviet Union	Hanover, Germany
20:15 UTC+2	Whelan 38'	Report	Protassov 74'	Stadium: Niedersachsenstadion; Attendance: 38,308; Referee: Soriano Aladren (Spain)

18 June 1988 UEFA Euro 1988 Group 2	Republic of Ireland	0–1	Netherlands	Gelsenkirchen, Germany
15:30 UTC+2		Report	Kieft 82'	Stadium: Parkstadion; Attendance: 60,800; Referee: Brummeier (Austria)

14 September 1988 1990 FIFA World Cup qualification Group 6	Northern Ireland	0–0	Republic of Ireland	Belfast, Northern Ireland
		Report		Stadium: Windsor Park; Attendance: 19,873; Referee: Vautrot (France)

19 October 1988 Friendly	Republic of Ireland	4–0	Tunisia	Dublin, Ireland
	Cascarino 26', 44'; Aldridge 45'; Sheedy 87'	Report		Stadium: Lansdowne Road; Attendance: 12,000; Referee: Snoddy (Northern Ireland)

16 November 1988 1990 FIFA World Cup qualification Group 6	Spain	2–0	Republic of Ireland	Seville, Spain
	Manolo 52'; Butragueño 66'	Report		Stadium: Estadio Benito Villamarín; Attendance: 50,000; Referee: Savchenko (USSR)

=== 1989 ===
7 February 1989 Friendly	Republic of Ireland	0–0	France	Dublin, Ireland
		Report		Stadium: Dalymount Park; Attendance: 22,000; Referee: Lloyd (Wales)

8 March 1989 1990 FIFA World Cup qualification Group 6	Hungary	0–0	Republic of Ireland	Budapest, Hungary
		Report		Stadium: Nepstadion; Attendance: 33,966; Referee: Petrović (Yugoslavia)

26 April 1989 1990 FIFA World Cup qualification Group 6	Republic of Ireland	1–0	Spain	Dublin, Ireland
	Míchel 16' (o.g.)	Report		Stadium: Lansdowne Road; Attendance: 49,600; Referee: Brummeier (Austria)

28 May 1989 1990 FIFA World Cup qualification Group 6	Republic of Ireland	2–0	Malta	Dublin, Ireland
	Houghton 32'; Moran 55'	Report		Stadium: Lansdowne Road; Attendance: 48,000; Referee: dos Santos (Portugal)

4 June 1989 1990 FIFA World Cup qualification Group 6	Republic of Ireland	2–0	Hungary	Dublin, Ireland
	McGrath 34'; Cascarino 80'	Report		Stadium: Lansdowne Road; Attendance: 48,600; Referee: Nervik (Norway)

6 September 1989 Friendly	Republic of Ireland	1–1	West Germany	Dublin, Ireland
	Stapleton 10'	Report	Dorfner 33'	Stadium: Lansdowne Road; Attendance: 48,000; Referee: Van den Wijngaert (Belgium)

11 October 1989 1990 FIFA World Cup qualification Group 6	Republic of Ireland	3–0	Northern Ireland	Dublin, Ireland
	Whelan 43'; Cascarino 47'; Houghton 57'	Report		Stadium: Lansdowne Road; Attendance: 45,800; Referee: D'Elia (Italy)

15 November 1989 1990 FIFA World Cup qualification Group 6	Malta	0–2	Republic of Ireland	Ta'Qali, Malta
		Report	Aldridge 30', 68' (pen.)	Stadium: National Stadium; Attendance: 5,000; Referee: Uilenberg (Netherlands)

== See also ==
- Republic of Ireland national football team 1970s results
- Republic of Ireland national football team 1990s results
