= 1982–83 European Cup Winners' Cup =

Tournament details
- Dates: 17 August 1982 – 11 May 1983
- Teams: 34

Final positions
- Champions: (Scotland) Aberdeen (1st title)
- Runners-up: (Spain) Real Madrid

Tournament statistics
- Matches played: 65
- Goals scored: 198 (3.05 per match)
- Attendance: 1,497,585 (23,040 per match)
- Top scorer(s): Santillana (Real Madrid); 8 goals

The 1982–83 season of the European Cup Winners' Cup was won by Scottish club Aberdeen in an extra-time victory against Real Madrid. Alex Ferguson's young side defeated the Spanish giants after a notable victory over Bayern Munich in the quarter-final. Having conquered the domestic game in Scotland, by defeating the European Cup holders Hamburger SV to win the 1983 European Super Cup, Aberdeen went on to become the only Scottish team to win two European trophies, a record which still stands today. It was the second and last time the title went to Scotland, following Rangers' victory in 1972.

== Preliminary round ==
Team 1	Agg.	Team 2	1st leg	2nd leg
Aberdeen (Scotland)	11–1	(Switzerland) Sion	7–0	4–1
Swansea City (Wales)	3–1	(Portugal) Braga	3–0	0–1

=== First leg ===
17 August 1982

Swansea City (Wales)	3–0	(Portugal) Braga
Charles 42', 87'; Hadžiabdić 63'	Report

Vetch Field, Swansea
Attendance: 10,641
Referee: Clive Thomas (Wales)

18 August 1982

Aberdeen (Scotland)	7–0	(Switzerland) Sion
Black 2', 56'; Strachan 21'; Hewitt 23'; Simpson 34'; McGhee 63'; Kennedy 82'	Report

Pittodrie Stadium, Aberdeen
Attendance: 12,013
Referee: Karl-Heinz Tritschler (West Germany)

=== Second leg ===
25 August 1982

Braga (Portugal)	1–0	(Wales) Swansea City
Marustik 87' (o.g.)	Report

Estádio 1º de Maio, Braga
Attendance: 18,000
Referee: Jakob Baumann (Switzerland)

1 September 1982

Sion (Switzerland)	1–4	(Scotland) Aberdeen
Bregy 69'	Report	Hewitt 27'; Miller 61'; McGhee 64', 72'

Stade Tourbillon, Sion
Attendance: 2,400
Referee: J. Glazar (Yugoslavia)

== First round ==
Team 1	Agg.	Team 2	1st leg	2nd leg
Coleraine (Northern Ireland)	0–7	(England) Tottenham Hotspur	0–3	0–4
Torpedo Moscow (Soviet Union)	1–1 (a)	(West Germany) Bayern Munich	1–1	0–0
Aberdeen (Scotland)	1–0	(Albania) Dinamo Tirana	1–0	0–0
ÍBV (Iceland)	0–4	(Poland) Lech Poznań	0–1	0–3
Swansea City (Wales)	17–0	(Malta) Sliema Wanderers	12–0	5–0
Lokomotiv Sofia (Bulgaria)	2–5	(France) Paris Saint-Germain	1–0	1–5
Dynamo Dresden (East Germany)	4–4 (a)	(Denmark) B.93	3–2	1–2
Waterschei Thor (Belgium)	8–1	(Luxembourg) Red Boys Differdange	7–1	1–0
Galatasaray (Turkey)	3–2	(Finland) FC Kuusysi	2–1	1–1
Austria Vienna	3–2	(Greece) Panathinaikos	2–0	1–2
Lillestrøm (Norway)	0–7	(Socialist Federal Republic of Yugoslavia) Red Star Belgrade	0–4	0–3
Barcelona (Spain)	9–1	(Cyprus) Apollon Limassol	8–0	1–1
Limerick (Republic of Ireland)	1–2	(Netherlands) AZ	1–1	0–1
Internazionale (Italy)	3–2	(Czechoslovakia) Slovan Bratislava	2–0	1–2
Baia Mare (Romania)	2–5	(Spain) Real Madrid	0–0	2–5
IFK Göteborg (Sweden)	2–4	(Hungary) Újpesti Dózsa	1–1	1–3

=== First leg ===
15 September 1982

Coleraine (Northern Ireland)	0–3	(England) Tottenham Hotspur
	Report	Archibald 12'; Crooks 49', 84'

The Showgrounds, Coleraine
Attendance: 12,000

15 September 1982

Torpedo Moscow (Soviet Union)	1–1	(West Germany) Bayern Munich
Petrakov 39'	Report	Breitner 61'

Central Lenin Stadium, Moscow
Attendance: 31,750

15 September 1982

Aberdeen (Scotland)	1–0	(Albania) Dinamo Tirana
Hewitt 10'	Report

Pittodrie Stadium, Aberdeen
Attendance: 14,600
Referee: Louis Delsemme (Belgium)

14 September 1982

ÍBV (Iceland)	0–1	(Poland) Lech Poznań
	Report	Partyński 30'

Kópavogsvöllur, Kópavogur
Attendance: 287

15 September 1982

Swansea City (Wales)	12–0	(Malta) Sliema Wanderers
Charles 16', 50'; Loveridge 19', 54'; Irwin 22'; Latchford 42'; Hadžiabdić 60'; Walsh 62', 68', 79'; Rajković 75'; Stevenson 85'	Report

Vetch Field, Swansea
Attendance: 5,130

15 September 1982

Lokomotiv Sofia (Bulgaria)	1–0	(France) Paris Saint-Germain
Milanov 15'	Report

Vasil Levski National Stadium, Sofia
Attendance: 4,800

15 September 1982

Dynamo Dresden (East Germany)	3–2	(Denmark) B.93
Trautmann 8', 15'; Pilz 80'	Report	Francker 49'; Madsen 90'

Rudolf-Harbig-Stadion, Dresden
Attendance: 24,800

22 September 1982

Waterschei Thor (Belgium)	7–1	(Luxembourg) Red Boys Differdange
Guðmundsson 8', 20'; Berger 15', 55'; P. Janssen 22'; Vliegen 37'; Coninx 72'	Report	Di Domenico 80'

Andre Dumontstadion, Genk
Attendance: 7,334

15 September 1982

Galatasaray (Turkey)	2–1	(Finland) FC Kuusysi
Raşit 21'; Mustafa 29'	Report	Annunen 23'

Ali Sami Yen Stadium, Istanbul
Attendance: 24,910

15 September 1982

Austria Vienna	2–0	(Greece) Panathinaikos
Polster 6'; Steinkogler 10'	Report

Praterstadion, Vienna
Attendance: 12,000

15 September 1982

Lillestrøm (Norway)	0–4	(Socialist Federal Republic of Yugoslavia) Red Star Belgrade
	Report	D. Savić 38', 71'; Janjanin 56'; Jovin 61'

Åråsen Stadion, Lillestrøm
Attendance: 4,877

15 September 1982

Barcelona (Spain)	8–0	(Cyprus) Apollon Limassol
Maradona 6', 60', 63'; Schuster 35', 69'; Víctor 45'; Urbano 58'; Alexanko 81'	Report

Estadi del FC Barcelona, Barcelona
Attendance: 26,600
Referee: René Bindels (Luxembourg)

15 September 1982

Limerick (Republic of Ireland)	1–1	(Netherlands) AZ
Nolan 40'	Report	Jonker 47'

Markets Field, Limerick
Attendance: 3,000

15 September 1982

Internazionale (Italy)	2–0	(Czechoslovakia) Slovan Bratislava
Altobelli 78'; Sabato 83'	Report

San Siro, Milan
Attendance: 52,700

15 September 1982

FC Baia Mare (Romania)	0–0	(Spain) Real Madrid
	Report

Stadionul 23 August, Baia Mare
Attendance: 13,800
Referee: Franz Wöhrer (Austria)

15 September 1982

IFK Göteborg (Sweden)	1–1	(Hungary) Újpesti Dózsa
Strömberg 65'	Report	J. Kovács 37'

Nya Ullevi, Gothenburg
Attendance: 10,083

=== Second leg ===
28 September 1982

Tottenham Hotspur (England)	4–0	(Northern Ireland) Coleraine
Crooks 14'; Mabbutt 52'; Brooke 82'; Gibson 85'	Report

White Hart Lane, London
Attendance: 20,925

29 September 1982

Bayern Munich (West Germany)	0–0	(Soviet Union) Torpedo Moscow
	Report

Olympiastadion, Munich
Attendance: 19,000

29 September 1982

Dinamo Tirana (Albania)	0–0	(Scotland) Aberdeen
	Report

Qemal Stafa Stadium, Tirana
Attendance: 20,000
Referee: Bela Szabo (Hungary)

29 September 1982

Lech Poznań (Poland)	3–0	(Iceland) ÍBV
Okoński 7', 52'; Niewiadomski 50'	Report

Stadion Miejski, Poznań
Attendance: 10,250

29 September 1982

Sliema Wanderers (Malta)	0–5	(Wales) Swansea City
	Report	Curtis 19', 45'; Gale 38', 74'; Toshack 89'

National Stadium, Ta' Qali
Attendance: 3,429

28 September 1982

Paris Saint-Germain (France)	5–1	(Bulgaria) Lokomotiv Sofia
Toko 20', 81'; Bathenay 66'; N'Gom 85'; Lemoult 88'	Report	Bogdanov 15'

Parc des Princes, Paris
Attendance: 30,562

29 September 1982

B.93 (Denmark)	2–1	(East Germany) Dynamo Dresden
Larsen 72'; Madsen 82'	Report	Pilz 10'

Københavns Idrætspark, Copenhagen
Attendance: 3,800

29 September 1982

Red Boys Differdange (Luxembourg)	0–1	(Belgium) Waterschei Thor
	Report	P. Janssen 30'

Stade du Thillenberg, Differdange
Attendance: 2,250

29 September 1982

FC Kuusysi (Finland)	1–1	(Turkey) Galatasaray
Kallio 90'	Report	Hodžić 88'

Lahden kisapuisto, Lahti
Attendance: 1,744

29 September 1982

Panathinaikos (Greece)	2–1	Austria Vienna
Anastasiadis 27'; Charalambidis 78'	Report	Polster 53'

Leoforos Alexandras Stadium, Athens
Attendance: 22,961

29 September 1982

Red Star Belgrade (Socialist Federal Republic of Yugoslavia)	3–0	(Norway) Lillestrøm
M. Đurovski 3', 59'; Đurić 13'	Report

Stadion Crvena zvezda, Belgrade
Attendance: 8,354
Referee: Erkan Göksel

29 September 1982

Apollon Limassol (Cyprus)	1–1	(Spain) Barcelona
Christodoulou 55'	Report	Moratalla 38'

Tsirio Stadium, Limassol
Attendance: 6,600
Referee: Zivorad Vuksanović (Yugoslavia)

30 September 1982

AZ (Netherlands)	1–0	(Republic of Ireland) Limerick
Jonker 64'	Report

Alkmaarderhout, Alkmaar
Attendance: 4,068

29 September 1982

Slovan Bratislava (Czechoslovakia)	2–1	(Italy) Internazionale
Takáč 25'; Bobek 78'	Report	Müller 10' (pen.)

Tehelné pole, Bratislava
Attendance: 29,000

29 September 1982

Real Madrid (Spain)	5–2	(Romania) FC Baia Mare
Juanito 16'; González 33'; García Hernández 45'; Santillana 47'; Metgod 71'	Report	Koller 12'; Buzgău 89'

Santiago Bernabéu Stadium, Madrid
Attendance: 20,200
Referee: Stefanos Chatzistefanou (Cyprus)

29 September 1982

Újpesti Dózsa (Hungary)	3–1	(Sweden) IFK Göteborg
Törőcsik 5'; Kiss 25', 35'	Report	Szendrei 37' (o.g.)

Megyeri út, Budapest
Attendance: 6,905

== Second round ==
Team 1	Agg.	Team 2	1st leg	2nd leg
Tottenham Hotspur (England)	2–5	(West Germany) Bayern Munich	1–1	1–4
Aberdeen (Scotland)	3–0	(Poland) Lech Poznań	2–0	1–0
Swansea City (Wales)	0–3	(France) Paris Saint-Germain	0–1	0–2
B.93 (Denmark)	1–6	(Belgium) Waterschei Thor	0–2	1–4
Galatasaray (Turkey)	3–4	Austria Vienna	2–4	1–0
Red Star Belgrade (Socialist Federal Republic of Yugoslavia)	3–6	(Spain) Barcelona	2–4	1–2
AZ (Netherlands)	1–2	(Italy) Internazionale	1–0	0–2
Real Madrid (Spain)	4–1	(Hungary) Újpesti Dózsa	3–1	1–0

=== First leg ===
20 October 1982

Tottenham Hotspur (England)	1–1	(West Germany) Bayern Munich
Archibald 3'	Report	Breitner 53'

White Hart Lane, London
Attendance: 36,488

20 October 1982

Aberdeen (Scotland)	2–0	(Poland) Lech Poznań
McGhee 55'; Weir 56'	Report

Pittodrie Stadium, Aberdeen
Attendance: 17,425
Referee: Egbert Mulder (Netherlands)

20 October 1982

Swansea City (Wales)	0–1	(France) Paris Saint-Germain
	Report	Toko 71'

Vetch Field, Swansea
Attendance: 9,505

20 October 1982

B.93 (Denmark)	0–2	(Belgium) Waterschei Thor
	Report	P. Janssen 66'; Guðmundsson 72'

Østerbro Stadium, Copenhagen
Attendance: 5,000

20 October 1982

Galatasaray (Turkey)	2–4	Austria Vienna
Sejdić 19', 45'	Report	Steinkogler 43'; Polster 52', 71'; Gasselich 75'

Ali Sami Yen Stadium, Istanbul
Attendance: 34,689

20 October 1982

Red Star Belgrade (Socialist Federal Republic of Yugoslavia)	2–4	(Spain) Barcelona
Janjanin 73', 75'	Report	Maradona 10', 48'; Schuster 64', 82'

Stadion Crvena zvezda, Belgrade
Attendance: 85,227

20 October 1982

AZ (Netherlands)	1–0	(Italy) Internazionale
Tiktak 6'	Report

Alkmaarderhout, Alkmaar
Attendance: 11,000

20 October 1982

Real Madrid (Spain)	3–1	(Hungary) Újpesti Dózsa
Santillana 33', 90'; Juanito 37'	Report	Kiss 36'

Santiago Bernabéu Stadium, Madrid
Attendance: 32,000

=== Second leg ===
3 November 1982

Bayern Munich (West Germany)	4–1	(England) Tottenham Hotspur
Hoeneß 17'; Horsmann 53'; Breitner 73'; K.-H. Rummenigge 80'	Report	Hughton 70'

Olympiastadion, Munich
Attendance: 54,000

3 November 1982

Lech Poznań (Poland)	0–1	(Scotland) Aberdeen
	Report	Bell 59'

Stadion Miejski, Poznań
Attendance: 22,000
Referee: Talat Tokat (Turkey)

3 November 1982

Paris Saint-Germain (France)	2–0	(Wales) Swansea City
Kist 8'; Fernández 76'	Report

Parc des Princes, Paris
Attendance: 49,179

3 November 1982

Waterschei Thor (Belgium)	4–1	(Denmark) B.93
P. Janssen 2'; P. Plessers 25' (pen.); Guðmundsson 42'; Vliegen 63'	Report	Dalsborg 88'

Andre Dumontstadion, Genk
Attendance: 8,490

3 November 1982

Austria Vienna	0–1	(Turkey) Galatasaray
	Report	Mustafa 43'

Franz Horr Stadium, Vienna
Attendance: 9,600

3 November 1982

Barcelona (Spain)	2–1	(Socialist Federal Republic of Yugoslavia) Red Star Belgrade
Schuster 57'; Alexanko 81'	Report	B. Gjurovski 55'

Camp Nou, Barcelona
Attendance: 45,000

3 November 1982

Internazionale (Italy)	2–0	(Netherlands) AZ
Juary 4'; Altobelli 67'	Report

San Siro, Milan
Attendance: 61,914

3 November 1982

Újpesti Dózsa (Hungary)	0–1	(Spain) Real Madrid
	Report	Santillana 62'

Megyeri út, Budapest
Attendance: 8,985

== Quarter-finals ==
Team 1	Agg.	Team 2	1st leg	2nd leg
Bayern Munich (West Germany)	2–3	(Scotland) Aberdeen	0–0	2–3
Paris Saint-Germain (France)	2–3	(Belgium) Waterschei Thor	2–0	0–3 (aet)
Austria Vienna	1–1 (a)	(Spain) Barcelona	0–0	1–1
Internazionale (Italy)	2–3	(Spain) Real Madrid	1–1	1–2

=== First leg ===
2 March 1983

Bayern Munich (West Germany)	0–0	(Scotland) Aberdeen
	Report

Olympiastadion, Munich
Attendance: 28,000
Referee: Emilio Carlos Muro (Spain)

2 March 1983

Paris Saint-Germain (France)	2–0	(Belgium) Waterschei Thor
Fernández 43'; Pilorget 57'	Report

Parc des Princes, Paris
Attendance: 49,407

2 March 1983

Austria Vienna	0–0	(Spain) Barcelona
	Report

Praterstadion, Vienna
Attendance: 25,000

2 March 1983

Internazionale (Italy)	1–1	(Spain) Real Madrid
Oriali 15'	Report	Gallego 59'

San Siro, Milan
Attendance: 75,248
Referee: Talal Tokat (Turkey)

=== Second leg ===
16 March 1983

Aberdeen (Scotland)	3–2	(West Germany) Bayern Munich
Simpson 39'; McLeish 77'; Hewitt 78'	Report	Augenthaler 10'; Pflügler 61'

Pittodrie Stadium, Aberdeen
Attendance: 23,537
Referee: Michel Vautrot (France)

16 March 1983

Waterschei Thor (Belgium)	3–0	(France) Paris Saint-Germain
Guðmundsson 29'; R. Janssen 57'; P. Janssen 114'	Report

Andre Dumontstadion, Genk
Attendance: 16,449

16 March 1983

Barcelona (Spain)	1–1	Austria Vienna
Alexanko 44'	Report	Steinkogler 38'

Camp Nou, Barcelona
Attendance: 34,000

16 March 1983

Real Madrid (Spain)	2–1	(Italy) Internazionale
Salguero 51'; Santillana 56'	Report	Altobelli 20'

Santiago Bernabéu Stadium, Madrid
Attendance: 85,000
Referee: Vojtech Christov (Czechoslovakia)

== Semi-finals ==
Team 1	Agg.	Team 2	1st leg	2nd leg
Aberdeen (Scotland)	5–2	(Belgium) Waterschei Thor	5–1	0–1
Austria Vienna	3–5	(Spain) Real Madrid	2–2	1–3

=== First leg ===
6 April 1983

Aberdeen (Scotland)	5–1	(Belgium) Waterschei Thor
Black 1'; Simpson 4'; McGhee 68', 83'; Weir 70'	Report	Guðmundsson 75'

Pittodrie Stadium, Aberdeen
Attendance: 23,500
Referee: Paolo Bergamo (Italy)

6 April 1983

Austria Vienna	2–2	(Spain) Real Madrid
Polster 4'; Magyar 20'	Report	Santillana 6'; San José 53'

Praterstadion, Vienna
Attendance: 40,000
Referee: Alek Jarguz

=== Second leg ===
19 April 1983

Waterschei Thor (Belgium)	1–0	(Scotland) Aberdeen
Voordeckers 72'	Report

Andre Dumontstadion, Genk
Attendance: 12,365
Referee: Adolf Prokop (East Germany)

20 April 1983

Real Madrid (Spain)	3–1	Austria Vienna
Santillana 10', 83'; Juanito 71'	Report	Juan José 68' (o.g.)

Santiago Bernabéu Stadium, Madrid
Attendance: 75,000
Referee: Bogdan Dotchev

== Final ==
11 May 1983

Aberdeen (Scotland)	2–1 (a.e.t.)	(Spain) Real Madrid
Black 7'; Hewitt 112'	Report	Juanito 15' (pen.)

Nya Ullevi, Gothenburg, Sweden
Attendance: 17,804
Referee: Gianfranco Menegali (Italy)

== Top scorers ==
Rank	Name	Team	Goals
1	(Spain) Santillana	(Spain) Real Madrid	8
2	(Iceland) Lárus Guðmundsson	(Belgium) Waterschei Thor	6
2	(Scotland) Mark McGhee	(Scotland) Aberdeen	6
4	(Austria) Toni Polster	Austria Vienna	5
4	(Scotland) John Hewitt	(Scotland) Aberdeen	5
4	(Argentina) Diego Maradona	(Spain) Barcelona	5
4	(West Germany) Bernd Schuster	(Spain) Barcelona	5
8	(Wales) Jeremy Charles	(Wales) Swansea City	4
8	(Scotland) Eric Black	(Scotland) Aberdeen	4
8	(Belgium) Pier Janssen	(Belgium) Waterschei Thor	4

== See also ==
- 1982–83 European Cup
- 1982–83 UEFA Cup
