= UEFA Euro 1988 qualifying Group 7 =

Football tournament qualifying stage

Standings and results for Group 7 of the UEFA Euro 1988 qualifying tournament.

Group 7 consisted of Belgium, Bulgaria, Luxembourg, Republic of Ireland and Scotland. Group winners were Republic of Ireland, who finished one point clear of second-placed Bulgaria. It was Ireland's first appearance in the final stages of a major tournament: while Belgium, who had recently taken fourth place in the 1986 World Cup, were group favourites but importantly failed to win any of their matches against either Ireland or Bulgaria, who both finished ahead of them. Scotland, who finished fourth, had started the group badly but as soon as qualification was a mathematical impossibility, they made a late run in which they scored victories over both Belgium and Bulgaria: the latter, a victory with a late goal four minutes from time, secured Ireland's place in the finals after Ireland had finished all their matches, when a draw would have handed the group to Bulgaria on goal difference. Scotland then faltered in their final match against Luxembourg, a 0–0 draw handing them their only point of the campaign when a victory would have put them certainly into third place and possibly second.

== Final table ==
Pos	Team	Pld	W	D	L	GF	GA	GD	Pts	Qualification	(Republic of Ireland)	(Bulgaria)	(Belgium)	(Scotland)	(Luxembourg)
1	Republic of Ireland	8	4	3	1	10	5	+5	11	Qualify for final tournament	—	2–0	0–0	0–0	2–1
2	Bulgaria	8	4	2	2	12	6	+6	10		2–1	—	2–0	0–1	3–0
3	Belgium	8	3	3	2	16	8	+8	9		2–2	1–1	—	4–1	3–0
4	Scotland	8	3	3	2	7	5	+2	9		0–1	0–0	2–0	—	3–0
5	Luxembourg	8	0	1	7	2	23	−21	1		0–2	1–4	0–6	0–0	—

Source: UEFA
Rules for classification: Qualification tiebreakers

== Results ==
10 September 1986

Belgium	2 – 2	Republic of Ireland
Claesen 14'; Scifo 69'	Report	Stapleton 18'; Brady 90' (pen.)

King Baudouin Stadium, Brussels
Attendance: 22,212
Referee: Ioan Igna (Romania)
10 September 1986

Scotland	0 – 0	Bulgaria
	Report

Hampden Park, Glasgow
Attendance: 35,070
Referee: Erik Fredriksson (Sweden)

14 October 1986

Luxembourg	0 – 6	Belgium
	Report	Gerets 6'; Claesen 9', 54', 89' (pen.); Vercauteren 41'; Ceulemans 87'

Stade Municipal, Luxembourg City
Attendance: 9,534
Referee: Krzysztof Czemarmazowicz (Poland)

15 October 1986

Republic of Ireland	0 – 0	Scotland
	Report

Lansdowne Road, Dublin
Attendance: 47,000
Referee: Einar Halle (Norway)

12 November 1986

Scotland	3 – 0	Luxembourg
Cooper 24' (pen.), 38'; Johnston 70'	Report

Hampden Park, Glasgow
Attendance: 35,078
Referee: Eysteinn Guðmundsson (Iceland)

19 November 1986

Belgium	1– 1	Bulgaria
Janssen 48'	Report	Tanev 62'

King Baudouin Stadium, Brussels
Attendance: 22,780
Referee: Victoriano Sánchez Arminio (Spain)

18 February 1987

Scotland	0 – 1	Republic of Ireland
	Report	Lawrenson 8'

Hampden Park, Glasgow
Attendance: 45,081
Referee: Henk van Ettekoven (Netherlands)

1 April 1987

Bulgaria	2 – 1	Republic of Ireland
Sadakov 41'; Tanev 82' (pen.)	Report	Stapleton 53'

Vasil Levski National Stadium, Sofia
Attendance: 35,247
Referee: Carlos Alberto da Silva Valente (Portugal)
1 April 1987

Belgium	4 – 1	Scotland
Claesen 10', 55', 86'; Vercauteren 75'	Report	McStay 14'

Constant Vanden Stock Stadium, Anderlecht
Attendance: 26,650
Referee: Michel Vautrot (France)

29 April 1987

Republic of Ireland	0 – 0	Belgium
	Report

Lansdowne Road, Dublin
Attendance: 44,629
Referee: Heinz Holzmann (Austria)

30 April 1987

Luxembourg	1 – 4	Bulgaria
Langers 59'	Report	Sadakov 49'; Sirakov 55'; Tanev 62'; Kolev 82'

Stade Municipal, Luxembourg City
Attendance: 1,920
Referee: Guðmundur Haraldsson (Iceland)

20 May 1987

Bulgaria	3 – 0	Luxembourg
Sirakov 25'; Yordanov 39'; Kolev 56'	Report

Vasil Levski National Stadium, Sofia
Attendance: 14,756
Referee: Ion Craciunescu (Romania)

28 May 1987

Luxembourg	0 – 2	Republic of Ireland
	Report	Galvin 44'; Whelan 64'

Stade Municipal, Luxembourg City
Attendance: 4,965
Referee: Renzo Peduzzi (Switzerland)

9 September 1987

Republic of Ireland	2 – 1	Luxembourg
Stapleton 31'; McGrath 75'	Report	Krings 28'

Lansdowne Road, Dublin
Attendance: 18,000
Referee: Keith Cooper (Wales)

23 September 1987

Bulgaria	2 – 0	Belgium
Sirakov 19'; Tanev 70'	Report

Vasil Levski National Stadium, Sofia
Attendance: 51,000
Referee: Karl-Heinz Tritschler (West Germany)

14 October 1987

Republic of Ireland	2 – 0	Bulgaria
McGrath 52'; Moran 83'	Report

Lansdowne Road, Dublin
Attendance: 22,000
Referee: Johannes N.I. Keizer (Netherlands)
14 October 1987

Scotland	2 – 0	Belgium
McCoist 14'; McStay 79'	Report

Hampden Park, Glasgow
Attendance: 16,052
Referee: Paolo Casarin (Italy)

11 November 1987

Belgium	3 – 0	Luxembourg
Ceulemans 17'; Degryse 55'; Crève 81'	Report

King Baudouin Stadium, Brussels
Attendance: 2,504
Referee: Egil Nervik (Norway)
11 November 1987

Bulgaria	0 – 1	Scotland
	Report	Mackay 86'

Vasil Levski National Stadium, Sofia
Attendance: 49,976
Referee: Helmut Kohl (Austria)

2 December 1987

Luxembourg	0 – 0	Scotland
	Report

Stade de la Frontière, Esch-sur-Alzette
Attendance: 2,022
Referee: Manfred Neuner (West Germany)

== Goalscorers ==
There were 47 goals scored in 20 matches, for an average of 2.35 goals per match.

7 goals

- (Belgium national football team) Nico Claesen

5 goals

- (Bulgaria national football team) Lachezar Tanev

3 goals

- (Bulgaria national football team) Nasko Sirakov
- (Republic of Ireland national football team) Frank Stapleton

2 goals

- (Belgium national football team) Jan Ceulemans
- (Belgium national football team) Franky Vercauteren
- (Bulgaria national football team) Hristo Kolev
- (Republic of Ireland national football team) Paul McGrath
- (Scotland national football team) Davie Cooper
- (Scotland national football team) Paul McStay

1 goal

- (Belgium national football team) Peter Crève
- (Belgium national football team) Marc Degryse
- (Belgium national football team) Eric Gerets
- (Belgium national football team) Pier Janssen
- (Belgium national football team) Enzo Scifo
- (Bulgaria national football team) Ayan Sadakov
- (Bulgaria national football team) Georgi Yordanov
- (Luxembourg national football team) Armin Krings
- (Luxembourg national football team) Robby Langers
- (Republic of Ireland national football team) Liam Brady
- (Republic of Ireland national football team) Tony Galvin
- (Republic of Ireland national football team) Mark Lawrenson
- (Republic of Ireland national football team) Kevin Moran
- (Republic of Ireland national football team) Ronnie Whelan
- (Scotland national football team) Mo Johnston
- (Scotland national football team) Gary Mackay
- (Scotland national football team) Ally McCoist
