= Republic of Ireland national football team results (1990–1999) =

- Win Draw Loss Void

This article contains the results of the Republic of Ireland national football team during the 1990s.

== Results ==
=== 1990 ===
28 March 1990 Friendly	Republic of Ireland	1–0	Wales	Dublin, Ireland
	Slaven 86'	Report		Stadium: Lansdowne Road; Attendance: 41,350; Referee: Gunn (England)

25 April 1990 Friendly	Republic of Ireland	1–0	Soviet Union	Dublin, Ireland
	Staunton 59'	Report		Stadium: Lansdowne Road; Attendance: 43,990; Referee: Kleinaitis (USA)

16 May 1990 Friendly	Republic of Ireland	1–1	Finland	Dublin, Ireland
	Sheedy 85'	Report	Tauriainen 76'	Stadium: Lansdowne Road; Attendance: 31,556; Referee: Gifford (Wales)

26 May 1990 Friendly	Turkey	0–0	Republic of Ireland	İzmir, Turkey
		Report		Stadium: İzmir Atatürk Stadium; Attendance: 5,000; Referee: Kirkof (USSR)

2 June 1990 Friendly	Malta	0–3	Republic of Ireland	Ta'Qali, Malta
		Report	Quinn 43'; Townsend 72'; Stapleton 87'	Stadium: National Stadium; Attendance: 800; Referee: Azzopardi (Malta)

11 June 1990 1990 FIFA World Cup Group F	England	1–1	Republic of Ireland	Cagliari, Italy
21:00 UTC+2	Lineker 8'	Report	Sheedy 73'	Stadium: Stadio Sant'Elia; Attendance: 35,238; Referee: Schmidhuber (West Germany)

17 June 1990 1990 FIFA World Cup Group F	Republic of Ireland	0–0	Egypt	Palermo, Italy
17:00 UTC+2		Report		Stadium: Stadio La Favorita; Attendance: 33,288; Referee: Langenhove (Belgium)

21 June 1990 1990 FIFA World Cup Group F	Netherlands	1–1	Republic of Ireland	Palermo, Italy
21:00 UTC+2	Gullit 10'	Report	Quinn 71'	Stadium: Stadio La Favorita; Attendance: 33,288; Referee: Vautrot (France)

25 June 1990 1990 FIFA World Cup Round of 16	Republic of Ireland	0–0 (a.e.t.) (5–4 p)	Romania	Genoa, Italy
17:00 UTC+2		Report		Stadium: Stadio Luigi Ferraris; Attendance: 31,818; Referee: Wright (Brazil)
	Penalties
	Sheedy (penalty scored); Houghton (penalty scored); Townsend (penalty scored); Cascarino (penalty scored); O'Leary (penalty scored)		Hagi (penalty scored); Lupu (penalty scored); Rotariu (penalty scored); Lupescu (penalty scored); Timofte (penalty missed)

30 June 1990 1990 FIFA World Cup quarter-finals	Italy	1–0	Republic of Ireland	Rome, Italy
21:00 UTC+2	Schillaci 38'	Report		Stadium: Stadio Olimpico; Attendance: 73,303; Referee: Valente (Portugal)

12 September 1990 Friendly	Republic of Ireland	1–0	Morocco	Dublin, Ireland
	David Kelly 74'	Report		Stadium: Dalymount Park; Attendance: 19,450; Referee: McKnight (Northern Ireland)

17 October 1990 UEFA Euro 1992 qualifying Group 7	Republic of Ireland	5–0	Turkey	Dublin, Ireland
	Aldridge 15', 57', 72' (pen.); O'Leary 40'; Quinn 65'	Report		Stadium: Lansdowne Road; Attendance: 46,000; Referee: Fredriksson (Sweden)

14 November 1990 UEFA Euro 1992 qualifying Group 7	Republic of Ireland	1–1	England	Dublin, Ireland
	Cascarino 80'	Report	Platt 67'	Stadium: Lansdowne Road; Attendance: 46,000; Referee: D'Elia (Italy)

=== 1991 ===
6 February 1991 Friendly	Wales	0–3	Republic of Ireland	Wrexham, Wales
		Report	Quinn 23', 66'; John Byrne 86'	Stadium: Racecourse Ground; Attendance: 9,168; Referee: McKnight (Northern Ireland)

27 March 1991 UEFA Euro 1992 qualifying Group 7	England	1–1	Republic of Ireland	London, England
	Dixon 9'	Report	Quinn 29'	Stadium: Wembley Stadium; Attendance: 77,753; Referee: Röthlisberger (Switzerland)

1 May 1991 UEFA Euro 1992 qualifying Group 7	Republic of Ireland	0–0	Poland	Dublin, Ireland
		Report		Stadium: Lansdowne Road; Attendance: 45,000; Referee: Blankenstein (Netherlands)

22 May 1991 Friendly	Republic of Ireland	1–1	Chile	Dublin, Ireland
	David Kelly 81'	Report	Estay 64'	Stadium: Lansdowne Road; Attendance: 32,000; Referee: Roduit (Switzerland)

1 June 1991 World Series of Soccer	United States	1–1	Republic of Ireland	Foxborough, Massachusetts, United States
	Wynalda 68'	Report	Cascarino 55'	Stadium: Foxboro Stadium; Attendance: 51,273; Referee: Arrowsmith (Canada)

11 September 1991 Friendly	Hungary	1–2	Republic of Ireland	Győr, Hungary
	Kovács 59'	Report	David Kelly 61'; Sheedy 69'	Stadium: Stadion ETO; Attendance: 5,000; Referee: Vassilakis (Greece)

16 October 1991 UEFA Euro 1992 qualifying Group 7	Poland	3–3	Republic of Ireland	Poznań, Poland
	Czachowski 54'; Furtok 74'; Urban 85'	Report	McGrath 12'; Townsend 60'; Cascarino 69'	Stadium: Stadion Lecha; Attendance: 20,000; Referee: Goethals (Belgium)

13 November 1991 UEFA Euro 1992 qualifying Group 7	Turkey	1–3	Republic of Ireland	Istanbul, Turkey
	Çalımbay 13' (pen.)	Report	John Byrne 8', 57'; Cascarino 54'	Stadium: İnönü Stadium; Attendance: 40,000; Referee: Petrović (Yugoslavia)

=== 1992 ===
19 February 1992 Friendly	Republic of Ireland	0–1	Wales	Dublin, Ireland
		Report	Pembridge 72'	Stadium: RDS Arena; Attendance: 15,100; Referee: Muhmenthaler (Switzerland)

25 March 1992 Friendly	Republic of Ireland	2–1	Switzerland	Dublin, Ireland
	Coyne 27'; Aldridge 88' (pen.)	Report	Whelan 25' (o.g.)	Stadium: Lansdowne Road; Attendance: 23,601; Referee: Domínguez (USA)

29 April 1992 Friendly	Republic of Ireland	4–1	United States	Dublin, Ireland
	Townsend 47'; Irwin 52'; Quinn 68'; Cascarino 87'	Report	Wynalda 89'	Stadium: Lansdowne Road; Attendance: 27,000; Referee: Piraux (Belgium)

26 May 1992 1994 FIFA World Cup qualification Group 3	Republic of Ireland	2–0	Albania	Dublin, Ireland
	Aldridge 60'; McGrath 80'	Report		Stadium: Lansdowne Road; Attendance: 29,727; Referee: Uilenberg (Netherlands)

30 May 1992 1992 U.S. Cup	United States	3–1	Republic of Ireland	Washington, D.C., United States
	Pérez 54'; Balboa 70'; Harkes 87'	Report	McCarthy 51'	Stadium: RFK Stadium; Attendance: 35,696; Referee: Seiffert (Canada)

4 June 1992 1992 U.S. Cup	Italy	2–0	Republic of Ireland	Foxborough, Massachusetts, United States
22:00 UTC−4	Signori 17'; Costacurta 56'	Report		Stadium: Foxboro Stadium; Attendance: 34,797; Referee: D'Aquila (USA)

7 June 1992 1992 U.S. Cup	Republic of Ireland	2–0	Portugal	Foxborough, Massachusetts, United States
	Staunton 39'; Coyne 89'	Report		Stadium: Foxboro Stadium; Attendance: 41,227; Referee: Dias (USA)

9 September 1992 1994 FIFA World Cup qualification Group 3	Republic of Ireland	4–0	Latvia	Dublin, Ireland
	Sheedy 31'; Aldridge 59', 81' (pen.), 88'	Report		Stadium: Lansdowne Road; Attendance: 32,000; Referee: Frisk (Sweden)

14 October 1992 1994 FIFA World Cup qualification Group 3	Denmark	0–0	Republic of Ireland	Copenhagen, Denmark
		Report		Stadium: Parken Stadium; Attendance: 40,100; Referee: Wojcik (Poland)

18 November 1992 1994 FIFA World Cup qualification Group 3	Spain	0–0	Republic of Ireland	Seville, Spain
		Report		Stadium: Sánchez Pizjuan; Attendance: 50,000; Referee: Constantin (Belgium)

=== 1993 ===
17 February 1993 Friendly	Republic of Ireland	2–1	Wales	Dublin, Ireland
	Sheedy 76'; Coyne 81'	Report	Hughes 18'	Stadium: Tolka Park; Attendance: 9,500; Referee: Karlson (Sweden)

31 March 1993 1994 FIFA World Cup qualification Group 3	Republic of Ireland	3–0	Northern Ireland	Dublin, Ireland
	Townsend 20'; Quinn 22'; Staunton 28'	Report		Stadium: Lansdowne Road; Attendance: 33,000; Referee: Röthlisberger (Switzerland)

28 April 1993 1994 FIFA World Cup qualification Group 3	Republic of Ireland	1–1	Denmark	Dublin, Ireland
	Quinn 75'	Report	Vilfort 27'	Stadium: Lansdowne Road; Attendance: 33,000; Referee: Harrel (France)

26 May 1993 1994 FIFA World Cup qualification Group 3	Albania	1–2	Republic of Ireland	Tirana, Albania
	Kushta 7'	Report	Staunton 13'; Cascarino 77'	Stadium: Qemal Stafa; Attendance: 15,000; Referee: Cinciripini (Italy)

9 June 1993 1994 FIFA World Cup qualification Group 3	Latvia	0–2	Republic of Ireland	Riga, Latvia
		Report	Aldridge 14'; McGrath 43'	Stadium: Daugava; Attendance: 5,113; Referee: Jol (Netherlands)

16 June 1993 1994 FIFA World Cup qualification Group 3	Lithuania	0–1	Republic of Ireland	Vilnius, Lithuania
		Report	Staunton 40'	Stadium: Žalgiris Stadium; Attendance: 6,000; Referee: Philippi (Luxembourg)

8 September 1993 1994 FIFA World Cup qualification Group 3	Republic of Ireland	2–0	Lithuania	Dublin, Ireland
	Aldridge 5'; Kernaghan 26'	Report		Stadium: Lansdowne Road; Attendance: 33,000; Referee: Pedersen (Norway)

13 October 1993 1994 FIFA World Cup qualification Group 3	Republic of Ireland	1–3	Spain	Dublin, Ireland
	Sheridan 72'	Report	Caminero 11'; Salinas 14', 26'	Stadium: Lansdowne Road; Attendance: 50,000; Referee: Baldas (Italy)

17 November 1993 1994 FIFA World Cup qualification Group 3	Northern Ireland	1–1	Republic of Ireland	Belfast, Northern Ireland
	Jimmy Quinn 73'	Report	McLoughlin 76'	Stadium: Windsor Park; Attendance: 10,500; Referee: Çakar (Turkey)

=== 1994 ===
23 March 1994 Friendly	Republic of Ireland	0–0	Russia	Dublin, Ireland
		Report		Stadium: Lansdowne Road; Attendance: 36,000; Referee: Fallström (Sweden)

20 April 1994 Friendly	Netherlands	0–1	Republic of Ireland	Tilburg, Netherlands
		Report	Coyne 57'	Stadium: Willem II Stadion; Attendance: 14,000; Referee: Strampe (Germany)

24 May 1994 Friendly	Republic of Ireland	1–0	Bolivia	Dublin, Ireland
	Sheridan 85'	Report		Stadium: Lansdowne Road; Attendance: 32,500; Referee: Howells (Wales)

29 May 1994 Friendly	Germany	0–2	Republic of Ireland	Hanover, Germany
		Report	Cascarino 31'; Gary Kelly 68'	Stadium: Niedersachsenstadion; Attendance: 50,000; Referee: Encinar (Spain)

5 June 1994 Friendly	Republic of Ireland	1–3	Czech Republic	Dublin, Ireland
15:00 UTC+1	Townsend 43'	Report	Kuka 25' (pen.), 54'; Suchopárek 83'	Stadium: Lansdowne Road; Attendance: 43,465; Referee: Sundell (Sweden)

18 June 1994 1994 FIFA World Cup Group E	Italy	0–1	Republic of Ireland	East Rutherford, New Jersey, United States
16:00 UTC−4		Report	Houghton 11'	Stadium: Giants Stadium; Attendance: 75,338; Referee: van der Ende (Netherlands)

24 June 1994 1994 FIFA World Cup Group E	Mexico	2–1	Republic of Ireland	Orlando, Florida, United States
12:30 UTC−4	García 42', 65'	Report	Aldridge 84'	Stadium: Citrus Bowl; Attendance: 60,790; Referee: Röthlisberger (Switzerland)

28 June 1994 1994 FIFA World Cup Group E	Republic of Ireland	0–0	Norway	East Rutherford, New Jersey, United States
12:30 UTC−4		Report		Stadium: Giants Stadium; Attendance: 72,404; Referee: Cadena (Colombia)

4 July 1994 1994 FIFA World Cup Round of 16	Netherlands	2–0	Republic of Ireland	Orlando, Florida, United States
12:00 UTC−4	Bergkamp 11'; Jonk 41'	Report		Stadium: Citrus Bowl; Attendance: 61,355; Referee: Mikkelsen (Denmark)

7 September 1994 UEFA Euro 1996 qualifying Group 6	Latvia	0–3	Republic of Ireland	Riga, Latvia
		Report	Aldridge 16', 75' (pen.); Sheridan 29'	Stadium: Daugava Stadium; Attendance: 2,300; Referee: Frisk (Sweden)

12 October 1994 UEFA Euro 1996 qualifying Group 6	Republic of Ireland	4–0	Liechtenstein	Dublin, Ireland
	Coyne 2', 4'; Quinn 30', 82'	Report		Stadium: Lansdowne Road; Attendance: 32,980; Referee: Bergmann (Iceland)

16 November 1994 UEFA Euro 1996 qualifying Group 6	Northern Ireland	0–4	Republic of Ireland	Belfast, Northern Ireland
		Report	Aldridge 6'; Roy Keane 11'; Sheridan 38'; Townsend 54'	Stadium: Windsor Park; Attendance: 10,336; Referee: Muhmenthaler (Switzerland)

=== 1995 ===
15 February 1995 Friendly	Republic of Ireland	(1–0)	England	Dublin, Ireland
	David Kelly 22'	Match Abandoned 27' (Note: Match abandoned after 27 minutes following crowd trouble.)		Stadium: Lansdowne Road; Attendance: 46,000; Referee: Jol (Netherlands)

29 March 1995 UEFA Euro 1996 qualifying Group 6	Republic of Ireland	1–1	Northern Ireland	Dublin, Ireland
	Quinn 47'	Report	Dowie 72'	Stadium: Lansdowne Road; Attendance: 32,200; Referee: van der Ende (Netherlands)

26 April 1995 UEFA Euro 1996 qualifying Group 6	Republic of Ireland	1–0	Portugal	Dublin, Ireland
	Baía 44' (o.g.)	Report		Stadium: Lansdowne Road; Attendance: 33,500; Referee: Faellström (Sweden)

3 June 1995 UEFA Euro 1996 qualifying Group 6	Liechtenstein	0–0	Republic of Ireland	Eschen, Liechtenstein
		Report		Stadium: Sportpark Eschen-Mauren; Attendance: 4,500; Referee: Agius (Malta)

11 June 1995 UEFA Euro 1996 qualifying Group 6	Republic of Ireland	1–3	Austria	Dublin, Ireland
	Houghton 65'	Report	Polster 69', 78'; Ogris 72'	Stadium: Lansdowne Road; Attendance: 33,000; Referee: Merk (Germany)

6 September 1995 UEFA Euro 1996 qualifying Group 6	Austria	3–1	Republic of Ireland	Vienna, Austria
	Stöger 3', 64', 77'	Report	McGrath 74'	Stadium: Ernst Happel Stadion; Attendance: 24,000; Referee: Çakar (Turkey)

11 October 1995 UEFA Euro 1996 qualifying Group 6	Republic of Ireland	2–1	Latvia	Dublin, Ireland
	Aldridge 61' (pen.), 64'	Report	Rimkus 78'	Stadium: Lansdowne Road; Attendance: 33,500; Referee: Marin (Spain)

15 November 1995 UEFA Euro 1996 qualifying Group 6	Portugal	3–0	Republic of Ireland	Lisbon, Portugal
	Rui Costa 60'; Postiga 74'; Cadete 89'	Report		Stadium: Estádio da Luz; Attendance: 71,766; Referee: Ceccarini (Italy)

13 December 1995 UEFA Euro 1996 qualifying play-off	Netherlands	2–0	Republic of Ireland	Liverpool, England
	Kluivert 30', 86'	Report		Stadium: Anfield; Attendance: 40,000; Referee: Zhuk (Belarus)

=== 1996 ===
27 March 1996 Friendly	Republic of Ireland	0–2	Russia	Dublin, Ireland
		Report	Mostovoi 35'; Kolyvanov 54'	Stadium: Lansdowne Road; Attendance: 41,600; Referee: Luyten (Netherlands)

24 April 1996 Friendly	Czech Republic	2–0	Republic of Ireland	Prague, Czech Republic
17:00 UTC+2	Frýdek 61'; Kuka 68'	Report		Stadium: Stadion Evžena Rošického; Attendance: 6,118; Referee: Strampe (Germany)

29 May 1996 Friendly	Republic of Ireland	0–1	Portugal	Dublin, Ireland
		Report	Folha 39'	Stadium: Lansdowne Road; Attendance: 26,576; Referee: Detruche (Switzerland)

2 June 1996 Friendly	Republic of Ireland	2–2	Croatia	Dublin, Ireland
	Keith O'Neill 24'; Quinn 89'	Report	Šuker 14'; Boban 45'	Stadium: Lansdowne Road; Attendance: 29,100; Referee: Leduc (France

4 June 1996 Friendly	Netherlands	3–1	Republic of Ireland	Rotterdam, Netherlands
	Bergkamp 27'; Seedorf 77'; Cocu 88'	Report	Breen 15'	Stadium: De Kuip; Attendance: 15,000; Referee: Lambek (Denmark)

9 June 1996 1996 U.S. Cup	United States	2–1	Republic of Ireland	Foxborough, Massachusetts, United States
	Ramos 58'; Reyna 76'	Report	Connolly 57'	Stadium: Foxboro Stadium; Attendance: 25,332; Referee: Prendergast (Jamaica)

12 June 1996 1996 U.S. Cup	Mexico	2–2	Republic of Ireland	East Rutherford, New Jersey, United States
	García 40', 70'	Report	Connolly 44'; Davino 49' (o.g.)	Stadium: Giants Stadium; Attendance: 21,322; Referee: Dominguez (USA)

15 June 1996 1996 U.S. Cup	Republic of Ireland	3–0	Bolivia	East Rutherford, New Jersey, United States
	Keith O'Neill 12', 33'; Harte 45'	Report		Stadium: Giants Stadium; Attendance: 14,624; Referee: Baharmast (USA)

31 August 1996 1998 FIFA World Cup qualification Group 8	Liechtenstein	0–5	Republic of Ireland	Eschen, Liechtenstein
		Report	Townsend 5'; Keith O'Neill 9'; Quinn 12', 61'; Harte 20'	Stadium: Sportpark Eschen-Mauren; Attendance: 3,900; Referee: Shmolik (Belarus)

9 October 1996 1998 FIFA World Cup qualification Group 8	Republic of Ireland	3–0	Macedonia	Dublin, Ireland
	McAteer 8'; Cascarino 46', 70'	Report		Stadium: Lansdowne Road; Attendance: 31,671; Referee: Fisker (Denmark)

10 November 1996 1998 FIFA World Cup qualification Group 8	Republic of Ireland	0–0	Iceland	Dublin, Ireland
		Report		Stadium: Lansdowne Road; Attendance: 33,069; Referee: Ormandjiev (Bulgaria)

=== 1997 ===
11 February 1997 Friendly	Wales	0–0	Republic of Ireland	Cardiff, Wales
		Report		Stadium: Ninian Park; Attendance: 7,000; Referee: Young (Scotland)

2 April 1997 1998 FIFA World Cup qualification Group 8	Macedonia	3–2	Republic of Ireland	Skopje, Macedonia
	Stojkovski 28' (pen.), 44' (pen.); Hristov 59'	Report	McLoughlin 8'; David Kelly 78'	Stadium: City Stadium; Attendance: 11,000; Referee: Trentalange (Italy)

30 April 1997 1998 FIFA World Cup qualification Group 8	Romania	1–0	Republic of Ireland	Bucharest, Romania
	Ilie 33'	Report		Stadium: Steaua Stadium; Attendance: 25,000; Referee: van der Ende (Netherlands)

21 May 1997 1998 FIFA World Cup qualification Group 8	Republic of Ireland	5–0	Liechtenstein	Dublin, Ireland
	Connolly 28', 34', 41'; Cascarino 61', 80'	Report		Stadium: Lansdowne Road; Attendance: 33,200; Referee: Boutenko (Russia)

20 August 1997 1998 FIFA World Cup qualification Group 8	Republic of Ireland	0–0	Lithuania	Dublin, Ireland
		Report		Stadium: Lansdowne Road; Attendance: 32,620; Referee: Monteiro Coroado (Portugal)

6 September 1997 1998 FIFA World Cup qualification Group 8	Iceland	2–4	Republic of Ireland	Reykjavík, Iceland
	Gunnarsson 45'; Sigurðsson 47'	Report	Connolly 13'; Roy Keane 55', 65'; Kennedy 79'	Stadium: Laugardalsvöllur; Attendance: 3,981; Referee: Kulusic (Croatia)

10 September 1997 1998 FIFA World Cup qualification Group 8	Lithuania	1–2	Republic of Ireland	Vilnius, Lithuania
	Ziukas 51'	Report	Cascarino 17', 72'	Stadium: Žalgiris Stadium; Attendance: 7,000; Referee: Bikas (Greece)

11 October 1997 1998 FIFA World Cup qualification Group 8	Republic of Ireland	1–1	Romania	Dublin, Ireland
	Cascarino 83'	Report	Hagi 53'	Stadium: Lansdowne Road; Attendance: 34,500; Referee: Levnikov (Russia)

29 October 1997 1998 FIFA World Cup qualification play-off	Republic of Ireland	1–1	Belgium	Dublin, Ireland
	Irwin 7'	Report	Nilis 69'	Stadium: Lansdowne Road; Attendance: 32,305; Referee: Vágner (Hungary)

15 November 1997 1998 FIFA World Cup qualification play-off	Belgium	2–1 (3–2 agg.)	Republic of Ireland	Brussels, Belgium
	Oliveira 25'; Nilis 69'	Report	Houghton 58'	Stadium: Stade Roi Baudouin; Attendance: 31,455; Referee: Benkö (Austria)

=== 1998 ===
25 March 1998 Friendly	Czech Republic	2–1	Republic of Ireland	Olomouc, Czech Republic
17:00 UTC+2	Šmicer 50'; Lasota 76'	Report	Breen 10'	Stadium: Andruv Stadion; Attendance: 9,405; Referee: Juhos (Hungary)

22 April 1998 Friendly	Republic of Ireland	0–2	Argentina	Dublin, Ireland
		Report	Batistuta 26'; Ortega 40'	Stadium: Lansdowne Road; Attendance: 38,500; Referee: Dougal (Scotland)

23 May 1998 Friendly	Republic of Ireland	0–0	Mexico	Dublin, Ireland
		Report		Stadium: Lansdowne Road; Attendance: 28,500; Referee: Ashman (Wales)

5 September 1998 UEFA Euro 2000 qualifying Group 8	Republic of Ireland	2–0	Croatia	Dublin, Ireland
	Irwin 2' (pen.); Roy Keane 16'	Report		Stadium: Lansdowne Road; Attendance: 35,000; Referee: Pereira (Portugal)

14 October 1998 UEFA Euro 2000 qualifying Group 8	Republic of Ireland	5–0	Malta	Dublin, Ireland
	Robbie Keane 17', 19'; Roy Keane 54'; Quinn 62'; Breen 82'	Report		Stadium: Lansdowne Road; Attendance: 34,500; Referee: Olsen (Norway)

18 November 1998 UEFA Euro 2000 qualifying Group 8	FR Yugoslavia	1–0	Republic of Ireland	Beograd, Yugoslavia
	Mijatović 64'	Report		Stadium: Stadion Crvene Zvezde; Attendance: 28,250; Referee: Nielson (Sweden)

=== 1999 ===
10 February 1999 Friendly	Republic of Ireland	2–0	Paraguay	Dublin, Ireland
	Irwin 37' (pen.); Connolly 74'	Report		Stadium: Lansdowne Road; Attendance: 27,600; Referee: Orrason (Iceland)

28 April 1999 Friendly	Republic of Ireland	2–0	Sweden	Dublin, Ireland
	Kavanagh 75'; Kennedy 77'	Report		Stadium: Lansdowne Road; Attendance: 29,000; Referee: Garibian (France)

29 May 1999 Friendly	Republic of Ireland	0–1	Northern Ireland	Dublin, Ireland
		Report	Griffin 83'	Stadium: Lansdowne Road; Attendance: 12,100; Referee: Richards (Wales)

9 June 1999 UEFA Euro 2000 qualifying Group 8	Republic of Ireland	1–0	Macedonia	Dublin, Ireland
	Quinn 60'	Report		Stadium: Lansdowne Road; Attendance: 28,108; Referee: Meier (Switzerland)

1 September 1999 UEFA Euro 2000 qualifying Group 8	Republic of Ireland	2–1	FR Yugoslavia	Dublin, Ireland
	Robbie Keane 54'; Kennedy 69'	Report	Stanković 61'	Stadium: Lansdowne Road; Attendance: 31,400; Referee: Collina (Italy)

4 September 1999 UEFA Euro 2000 qualifying Group 8	Croatia	1–0	Republic of Ireland	Zagreb, Croatia
	Šuker 90+1'	Report		Stadium: Maksimir; Attendance: 30,000; Referee: Vega (Spain)

9 September 1999 UEFA Euro 2000 qualifying Group 8	Malta	2–3	Republic of Ireland	Ta'Qali, Malta
	Said 61'; Carabott 68' (pen.)	Report	Robbie Keane 13'; Breen 20'; Staunton 72'	Stadium: National Stadium; Attendance: 4,018; Referee: Carpodean (Romania)

9 October 1999 UEFA Euro 2000 qualifying Group 8	Macedonia	1–1	Republic of Ireland	Skopje, Macedonia
	Stavrevski 90'	Report	Quinn 18'	Stadium: City Stadium; Attendance: 6,000; Referee: Marín (Spain)

13 November 1999 UEFA Euro 2000 qualifying play-offs	Republic of Ireland	1–1	Turkey	Dublin, Ireland
	Robbie Keane 79'	Report	Havutçu 83' (pen.)	Stadium: Lansdowne Road; Attendance: 33,610; Referee: Frisk (Sweden)

17 November 1999 UEFA Euro 2000 qualifying play-offs	Turkey	0–0 (1–1 agg.)	Republic of Ireland	Bursa, Turkey
		Report		Stadium: Bursa Atatürk Stadium; Attendance: 19,900; Referee: Veissière (France)
Note: Turkey won on away goals.

== See also ==
- Republic of Ireland national football team - 1980s Results
- Republic of Ireland national football team - Results 2000-09
