= Lárus Guðmundsson =

Icelandic footballer

Personal information
- Full name: Lárus Guðmundsson
- Date of birth: 12 December 1961 (age 64)
- Place of birth: Iceland
- Position: Striker

Team information
- Current team: KFG Manager

Youth career
- Vikingur

Senior career*
Years	Team	Apps	(Gls)
1978–1981	Víkingur		
1982–1984	Waterschei		
1984–1987	Bayer Uerdingen	62	(17)
1987–1988	1. FC Kaiserslautern	7	(0)
1988	Víkingur	13	(4)
1989	Valur	12	(1)
1990–1991	UMF Stjarnan	18	(5)

International career
1976	Iceland U-17	1	(0)
1978	Iceland U-19	17	(3)
1982	Iceland U-21	1	(0)
1980–1987	Iceland	17	(3)
- * Club domestic league appearances and goals

Lárus Guðmundsson (born 12 December 1961) is an Icelandic former professional footballer who played as a striker.

== Club career ==
Guðmundsson started his career at Víkingur and later became successful in the German Bundesliga with Bayer Uerdingen and 1. FC Kaiserslautern.

== International career ==
He made his debut for Iceland in 1980 and went on to win 17 caps, scoring three goals.

== Honours ==
Bayer Uerdingen

- DFB-Pokal: 1984–85
