= Peter Crève =

Belgian footballer

Personal information
- Full name: Peter Crève
- Date of birth: 17 August 1961 (age 65)
- Place of birth: Ostend, Belgium
- Height: 1.80 m (5 ft 11 in)
- Position: Midfielder

Senior career*
Years	Team	Apps	(Gls)
1978–1980	AS Oostende	39	(6)
1980–1986	K.S.K. Beveren	170	(20)
1986–1994	Club Brugge	192	(7)

International career
1987–1988	Belgium	3	(1)
- * Club domestic league appearances and goals

Peter Crève (born 17 August 1961) is a retired Belgium footballer who played as a midfielder.
