= Nico Claesen =

Belgian footballer

Personal information
- Full name: Nicolaas Pieter Claesen
- Date of birth: 1 October 1962 (age 64)
- Place of birth: Maasmechelen, Belgium
- Height: 1.71 m (5 ft 7 in)
- Position: Striker

Senior career*
Years	Team	Apps	(Gls)
1977–1978	K. Patro Eisden Maasmechelen		
1978–1984	R.F.C. Seraing	85	(43)
1984–1985	VfB Stuttgart	29	(11)
1985–1986	Standard de Liège	28	(10)
1986–1988	Tottenham Hotspur	50	(18)
1988–1992	Antwerp	119	(39)
1992–1993	Germinal Ekeren	29	(15)
1993–1994	Antwerp	31	(2)
1994–1996	KV Oostende	57	(33)
1996–1998	K. Sint-Niklase S.K.E.	55	(19)
1998–2000	K. Beringen		
Total		473	(190)

International career
1983–1990	Belgium	36	(12)

Managerial career
- 2005–2008: Patro Eisden MM
- 2010: RFC Liège
- * Club domestic league appearances and goals

Nicolaas "Nico" Pieter Claesen (born 1 October 1962) is a former Belgian football player who works as head coach of RFC Liège.

== Career ==
Claesen was signed by Tottenham Hotspur in October 1986 by David Pleat who bought him from Standard Liège for £600,000. He made his debut against Liverpool at Anfield. In August 1988, when Terry Venables arrived, Claesen fell out of favour and was sold for £550,000 to Antwerp FC. He also played for VfB Stuttgart.

== International career ==
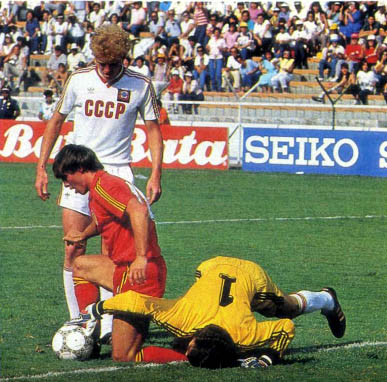
Oleh Kuznetsov, Claesen and goalkeeper Rinat Dasayev, during USSR-Belgium (FIFA 1986 World Cup)

Claesen earned 36 caps and scored 12 goals from 1983 to 1990 for the Belgium national team, and was in the squad for three major tournaments: UEFA Euro 1984, the 1986 FIFA World Cup, where he scored three goals as Belgium finished in fourth, and the 1990 FIFA World Cup.

== Honours ==
Tottenham Hotspur

- FA Cup runner-up: 1986–87

Antwerp

- Belgian Cup: 1991–92

Individual

- Belgian First Division top scorer: 1983–84 (27 goals)

== International goals ==
No.	Date	Venue	Opponent	Score	Result	Competition
1.	17 October 1984	Brussels, Belgium	Albania	1–0	3–1	1986 FIFA World Cup qualification
2.	19 May 1986	Brussels, Belgium	Yugoslavia	1–3	1–3	Friendly
3.	8 June 1986	Toluca, Mexico	Iraq	2–0	2–1	1986 FIFA World Cup
4.	15 June 1986	León, Mexico	Soviet Union	4–2	4–3 (a.e.t.)	1986 FIFA World Cup
5.	28 June 1986	Puebla, Mexico	France	2–2	2–4 (a.e.t.)	1986 FIFA World Cup
6.	10 September 1986	Brussels, Belgium	Republic of Ireland	1–0	2–2	UEFA Euro 1988 qualifying
7.	14 October 1986	Luxembourg City, Luxembourg	Luxembourg	2–0	6–0	UEFA Euro 1988 qualifying
8.	14 October 1986	Luxembourg City, Luxembourg	Luxembourg	4–0	6–0	UEFA Euro 1988 qualifying
9.	14 October 1986	Luxembourg City, Luxembourg	Luxembourg	6–0	6–0	UEFA Euro 1988 qualifying
10.	1 April 1987	Anderlecht, Belgium	Scotland	1–0	4–1	UEFA Euro 1988 qualifying
11.	1 April 1987	Anderlecht, Belgium	Scotland	2–1	4–1	UEFA Euro 1988 qualifying
12.	1 April 1987	Anderlecht, Belgium	Scotland	4–1	4–1	UEFA Euro 1988 qualifying
