= Pier Janssen =

Belgian footballer and manager

Personal information
- Date of birth: 9 September 1956 (age 70)
- Place of birth: Bree, Belgium
- Position: Midfielder

Youth career
- 1968–1976: Opitter FC

Senior career*
Years	Team	Apps	(Gls)
1976–1977	SK Bree		
1977–1985	Waterschei Thor	185+	(44+)
1985–1989	Anderlecht	66	(10)
1989–1991	Lokeren	55	(6)
1991–1992	Genk	2	(0)
Total		308+	(60+)

International career
1986–1987	Belgium	3	(1)

Managerial career
- 1991–1993: Genk (player-manager)
- 1994–1995: Patro Eisden Maasmechelen
- 1997–1999: Tongeren
- 2000–2001: Beringen-Heusden-Zolder
- 2002–2003: KVK Beringen
- * Club domestic league appearances and goals

Pieter "Pier" Janssen (born 9 September 1956), also referred to as Pierre or Piet, is a Belgian former footballer and manager who played as a midfielder and made three appearances for the Belgium national team.

== Career ==
Janssen made his international debut for Belgium on 19 November 1986 in a UEFA Euro 1988 qualifying match against Bulgaria, in which he scored the opening goal of the 1–1 home draw. He went on to make three appearances, scoring one goal, before making his last appearance on 29 April 1987 in a UEFA Euro 1988 qualifying match against the Republic of Ireland, which finished as a 0–0 draw.

== Career statistics ==
Belgium
Year	Apps	Goals
1986	1	1
1987	2	0
Total	3	1

No.	Date	Venue	Opponent	Score	Result	Competition
1	19 November 1986	Heysel Stadium, Brussels, Belgium	Bulgaria	1–0	1–1	UEFA Euro 1988 qualifying
