= Republic of Ireland national football team results (2000–2009) =

- Win Draw Loss

This article contains the results of the Republic of Ireland national football team between 2000 and 2009.

== Results ==
=== 2000 ===
23 February 2000 Friendly	Republic of Ireland	3–2	Czech Republic	Dublin, Ireland
19:30 UTC+0	Rada 16' (o.g.); Harte 44'; Robbie Keane 87'	Report	Koller 4', 35'	Stadium: Lansdowne Road; Attendance: 30,543; Referee: Coue (France)

26 April 2000 Friendly	Republic of Ireland	0–1	Greece	Dublin, Ireland
		Report	Lakis 15'	Stadium: Lansdowne Road; Attendance: 23,157; Referee: Dallas (Scotland)

30 May 2000 Friendly	Republic of Ireland	1–2	Scotland	Dublin, Ireland
	Kennedy 2'	Report	Burley 16'; Ferguson 29'	Stadium: Lansdowne Road; Attendance: 30,213; Referee: Pereira (Portugal)

4 June 2000 U.S. Cup	Republic of Ireland	2–2	Mexico	Chicago, Illinois, United States
16:30 UTC−5	Richard Dunne 60'; Foley 71'	Report	Osorno 38'; Sanchez 54'	Stadium: Soldier Field; Attendance: 36,469; Referee: unknown

6 June 2000 U.S. Cup	United States	1–1	Republic of Ireland	Foxborough, Massachusetts, United States
20:00 UTC−4	Razov 68'	Report	Foley 31'	Stadium: Foxboro Stadium; Attendance: 16,319; Referee: Archundia (Mexico)

11 June 2000 U.S. Cup	Republic of Ireland	2–1	South Africa	East Rutherford, New Jersey, United States
15:30 UTC−4	McPhail 24'; Quinn 80'	Report	McCarthy 14'	Stadium: Giants Stadium; Attendance: 45,008; Referee: Badilla (Costa Rica)

2 September 2000 2002 FIFA World Cup qualification	Netherlands	2–2	Republic of Ireland	Amsterdam, Netherlands
	Talan 71' van Bronckhourst 84'	Report	Robbie Keane 21'; McAteer 65'	Stadium: Amsterdam ArenA; Attendance: 45,000; Referee: Michel (Slovakia)

7 October 2000 2002 FIFA World Cup qualification	Portugal	1–1	Republic of Ireland	Lisbon, Portugal
	Conceição 57'	Report	Holland 73'	Stadium: Estádio da Luz; Attendance: 43,500; Referee: Ouzounov (Bulgaria)

11 October 2000 2002 FIFA World Cup qualification	Republic of Ireland	2–0	Estonia	Dublin, Ireland
	Kinsella 25'; Richard Dunne 51'	Report		Stadium: Lansdowne Road; Attendance: 34,962; Referee: Hauge (Norway)

15 November 2000 Friendly	Republic of Ireland	3–0	Finland	Dublin, Ireland
	Finnan 14'; Kilbane 85'; Staunton 90'	Report		Stadium: Lansdowne Road; Attendance: 22,368; Referee: Durkin (England)

=== 2001 ===
24 March 2001 2002 FIFA World Cup qualification	Cyprus	0–4	Republic of Ireland	Nicosia, Cyprus
		Report	Roy Keane 32', 88'; Harte 42' (pen.); Gary Kelly 80'	Stadium: Neo GSP Stadium; Attendance: 13,000; Referee: De Bleekere (Belgium)

28 March 2001 2002 FIFA World Cup qualification	Andorra	0–3	Republic of Ireland	Barcelona, Spain
		Report	Harte 33' (pen.); Kilbane 76'; Holland 80'	Stadium: Mini Estadi; Attendance: 5,000; Referee: Ishchenko (Ukraine)

25 April 2001 2002 FIFA World Cup qualification	Republic of Ireland	3–1	Andorra	Dublin, Ireland
	Kilbane 34'; Kinsella 36'; Breen 76'	Report	Lima 33'	Stadium: Lansdowne Road; Attendance: 35,000; Referee: Jakobsson (Iceland)

2 June 2001 2002 FIFA World Cup qualification	Republic of Ireland	1–1	Portugal	Dublin, Ireland
	Roy Keane 68'	Report	Figo 79'	Stadium: Lansdowne Road; Attendance: 35,000; Referee: Fisker (Denmark)

6 June 2001 2002 FIFA World Cup qualification	Estonia	0–2	Republic of Ireland	Tallinn, Estonia
		Report	Richard Dunne 8'; Holland 39'	Stadium: Lilleküla Stadium; Attendance: 9,300; Referee: Salomir (Romania)

15 August 2001 Friendly	Republic of Ireland	2–2	Croatia	Dublin, Ireland
	Duff 20'; Morrison 77'	Report	Vugrinec 80'; Šuker 90' (pen.)	Stadium: Lansdowne Road; Attendance: 27,000; Referee: Schluchter (Switzerland)

1 September 2001 2002 FIFA World Cup qualification	Republic of Ireland	1–0	Netherlands	Dublin, Ireland
	McAteer 68'	Report		Stadium: Lansdowne Road; Attendance: 35,400; Referee: Krug (Germany)

6 October 2001 2002 FIFA World Cup qualification	Republic of Ireland	4–0	Cyprus	Dublin, Ireland
	Harte 3'; Quinn 11'; Connolly 63'; Roy Keane 67'	Report		Stadium: Lansdowne Road; Attendance: 35,200; Referee: Roca (Spain)

10 November 2001 2002 FIFA World Cup qualification play-off	Republic of Ireland	2–0	Iran	Dublin, Ireland
	Harte 45' (pen.); Robbie Keane 50'	Report		Stadium: Lansdowne Road; Attendance: 36,018; Referee: Silva (Brazil)

15 November 2001 2002 FIFA World Cup qualification play-off	Iran	1–0 (1–2 agg.)	Republic of Ireland	Tehran, Iran
	Golmohammadi 90'	Report		Stadium: Azadi Stadium; Attendance: 100,000; Referee: Vega (Spain)

=== 2002 ===
13 February 2002 Friendly	Republic of Ireland	2–0	Russia	Dublin, Ireland
	Steven Reid 3'; Robbie Keane 20'			Stadium: Lansdowne Road; Attendance: 44,000; Referee: Gallagher (England)

27 March 2002 Friendly	Republic of Ireland	3–0	Denmark	Dublin, Ireland
	Harte 19'; Robbie Keane 54'; Morrison 90'			Stadium: Lansdowne Road; Attendance: 42,000; Referee: Lawlor (Wales)

16 April 2002 Friendly	Republic of Ireland	2–1	United States	Dublin, Ireland
	Kinsella 19'; Doherty 54'		Pope 34'	Stadium: Lansdowne Road; Attendance: 39,000; Referee: Leuba (Switzerland)

16 May 2002 Friendly	Republic of Ireland	1–2	Nigeria	Dublin, Ireland
	Steven Reid 69'	Report	Aghahowa 13'; Sodje 47'	Stadium: Lansdowne Road; Attendance: 42,652; Referee: Costa (Portugal)

1 June 2002 2002 FIFA World Cup Group E	Republic of Ireland	1–1	Cameroon	Niigata, Japan
15:30 UTC+9	Holland 52'	Report	Mboma 39'	Stadium: Niigata Stadium; Attendance: 33,679; Referee: Kamikawa (Japan)

5 June 2002 2002 FIFA World Cup Group E	Germany	1–1	Republic of Ireland	Kashima, Japan
20:30 UTC+9	Klose 19'	Report	Robbie Keane 90+2'	Stadium: Kashima Soccer Stadium; Attendance: 35,854; Referee: Milton Nielsen (Denmark)

11 June 2002 2002 FIFA World Cup Group E	Saudi Arabia	0–3	Republic of Ireland	Yokohama, Japan
20:30 UTC+9		Report	Robbie Keane 7'; Breen 61'; Duff 87'	Stadium: International Stadium Yokohama; Attendance: 65,320; Referee: N'Doye (Senegal)

16 June 2002 2002 FIFA World Cup Round of 16	Spain	1–1 (a.e.t.) (3–2 p)	Republic of Ireland	Suwon, South Korea
20:30 UTC+9	Morientes 8'	Report	Robbie Keane 90' (pen.)	Stadium: Suwon World Cup Stadium; Attendance: 38,926; Referee: Frisk (Sweden)
	Penalties
	Hierro (penalty scored); Baraja (penalty scored); Juanfran (penalty missed); Valerón (penalty missed); Mendieta (penalty scored)		Robbie Keane (penalty scored); Holland (penalty missed); Connolly (penalty missed); Kilbane (penalty missed); Finnan (penalty scored)

21 August 2002 Friendly	Finland	0–3	Republic of Ireland	Helsinki, Finland
			Robbie Keane 12'; Healy 74'; Barrett 83'	Stadium: Helsinki Olympic Stadium; Attendance: 12,225; Referee: Pedersen (Norway)

7 September 2002 UEFA Euro 2004 qualifying	Russia	4–2	Republic of Ireland	Moscow, Russia
	Karyaka 20'; Beschastnykh 25'; Kerzhakov 71'; Babb 88' (o.g.)		Doherty 69'; Morrison 76'	Stadium: Dynamo Stadium; Attendance: 23,000; Referee: Colombo (France)

16 October 2002 UEFA Euro 2004 qualifying	Republic of Ireland	1–2	Switzerland	Dublin, Ireland
	Magnin 78' (o.g.)		Yakin 45'; Celestini 87'	Stadium: Lansdowne Road; Attendance: 35,000; Referee: Pedersen (Norway)

20 November 2002 Friendly	Greece	0–0	Republic of Ireland	Athens, Greece
				Stadium: Leoforos Alexandras Stadium; Attendance: 2,100; Referee: Trentalange (Italy)

=== 2003 ===
12 February 2003 Friendly	Scotland	0–2	Republic of Ireland	Glasgow, Scotland
			Kilbane 7'; Morrison 16'	Stadium: Hampden Park; Attendance: 33,337; Referee: Braamhaar (Netherlands)

29 March 2003 UEFA Euro 2004 qualifying	Georgia	1–2	Republic of Ireland	Tbilisi, Georgia
	Kobiashvili 62'		Duff 18'; Doherty 84'	Stadium: Lokomotiv; Attendance: 15,000; Referee: Vassaras (Greece)

2 April 2003 UEFA Euro 2004 qualifying	Albania	0–0	Republic of Ireland	Tirana, Albania
				Stadium: Qemal Stafa; Attendance: 20,000; Referee: Farina (Italy)

30 April 2003 Friendly	Republic of Ireland	1–0	Norway	Dublin, Ireland
	Duff 17'			Stadium: Lansdowne Road; Attendance: 32,643; Referee: McCurry (Scotland)

7 June 2003 UEFA Euro 2004 qualifying	Republic of Ireland	2–1	Albania	Dublin, Ireland
	Robbie Keane 6'; Aliaj 90+2' (o.g.)		Skela 7'	Stadium: Lansdowne Road; Attendance: 33,000; Referee: Mikulski (Poland)

11 June 2003 UEFA Euro 2004 qualifying	Republic of Ireland	2–0	Georgia	Dublin, Ireland
	Doherty 43'; Robbie Keane 59'			Stadium: Lansdowne Road; Attendance: 36,000; Referee: González (Spain)

19 August 2003 Friendly	Republic of Ireland	2–1	Australia	Dublin, Ireland
	O'Shea 74'; Morrison 81'		Viduka 49'	Stadium: Lansdowne Road; Attendance: 40,000; Referee: Vidlak (Czech Republic)

6 September 2003 UEFA Euro 2004 qualifying	Republic of Ireland	1–1	Russia	Dublin, Ireland
	Duff 35'		Ignashevich 42'	Stadium: Lansdowne Road; Attendance: 36,000; Referee: Michel (Slovakia)

9 September 2003 Friendly	Republic of Ireland	2–2	Turkey	Dublin, Ireland
	Connolly 35'; Richard Dunne 90+'		Şükür 51'; Yılmaz 86'	Stadium: Lansdowne Road; Attendance: 27,200; Referee: Wegereef (Netherlands)

11 October 2003 UEFA Euro 2004 qualifying	Switzerland	2–0	Republic of Ireland	Basel, Switzerland
	Yakin 6'; Frei 60'			Stadium: St. Jakob Park; Attendance: 31,006; Referee: Frisk (Sweden)

18 November 2003 Friendly	Republic of Ireland	3–0	Canada	Dublin, Ireland
	Duff 23'; Robbie Keane 60', 84'			Stadium: Lansdowne Road; Attendance: 30,000; Referee: Whitby (Wales)

=== 2004 ===
18 February 2004 Friendly	Republic of Ireland	0–0	Brazil	Dublin, Ireland
		Report		Stadium: Lansdowne Road; Attendance: 44,000; Referee: Frisk (Sweden)

31 March 2004 Friendly	Republic of Ireland	2–1	Czech Republic	Dublin, Ireland
19:30 UTC+1	Harte 52'; Robbie Keane 90+'	Report	Baroš 81'	Stadium: Lansdowne Road; Attendance: 42,000; Referee: Fisker (Denmark)

28 April 2004 Friendly	Poland	0–0	Republic of Ireland	Bydgoszcz, Poland
		Report		Stadium: Zawiszy; Attendance: 15,500; Referee: Shebek (Ukraine)

27 May 2004 Friendly	Republic of Ireland	1–0	Romania	Dublin, Ireland
	Holland 84'	Report		Stadium: Lansdowne Road; Attendance: 42,356; Referee: Jára (Czech Republic)

29 May 2004 Unity Cup	Nigeria	3–0	Republic of Ireland	London, England
	Ogbeche 36', 69'; Martins 49'	Report		Stadium: The Valley; Attendance: 7,438; Referee: D'Urso (England)

2 June 2004 Unity Cup	Jamaica	0–1	Republic of Ireland	London, England
		Report	Barrett 26'	Stadium: The Valley; Attendance: 6,115; Referee: Styles (England)

5 June 2004 Friendly	Netherlands	0–1	Republic of Ireland	Amsterdam, Netherlands
		Report	Robbie Keane 45+'	Stadium: Amsterdam ArenA; Attendance: 42,000; Referee: Dean (England)

18 August 2004 Friendly	Republic of Ireland	1–1	Bulgaria	Dublin, Ireland
	Andy Reid 15'	Report	Bojinov 71'	Stadium: Lansdowne Road; Attendance: 32,887; Referee: Brines (Scotland)

4 September 2004 2006 FIFA World Cup qualification	Republic of Ireland	3–0	Cyprus	Dublin, Ireland
	Morrison 33'; Andy Reid 38'; Robbie Keane 55' (pen.)	Report		Stadium: Lansdowne Road; Attendance: 35,900; Referee: Paniashvili (Georgia)

8 September 2004 2006 FIFA World Cup qualification	Switzerland	1–1	Republic of Ireland	Basel, Switzerland
	Yakin 17'	Report	Morrison 9'	Stadium: St. Jakob Park; Attendance: 28,000; Referee: Vassaras (Greece)

9 October 2004 2006 FIFA World Cup qualification	France	0–0	Republic of Ireland	Saint Denis, France
		Report		Stadium: Stade de France; Attendance: 78,863; Referee: Ibáñez (Spain)

13 October 2004 2006 FIFA World Cup qualification	Republic of Ireland	2–0	Faroe Islands	Dublin, Ireland
	Robbie Keane 14' (pen.), 32'	Report		Stadium: Lansdowne Road; Attendance: 36,000; Referee: Lajuks (Latvia)

16 November 2004 Friendly	Republic of Ireland	1–0	Croatia	Dublin, Ireland
	Robbie Keane 24'	Report		Stadium: Lansdowne Road; Attendance: 33,200; Referee: Orrason (Iceland)

=== 2005 ===
9 February 2005 Friendly	Republic of Ireland	1–0	Portugal	Dublin, Ireland
	Andrew O'Brien 21'	Report		Stadium: Lansdowne Road; Attendance: 48,000; Referee: Messias (England)

26 March 2005 2006 FIFA World Cup qualification	Israel	1–1	Republic of Ireland	Ramat Gan, Israel
	Suan 90'	Report	Morrison 4'	Stadium: Ramat Gan Stadium; Attendance: 44,000; Referee: Ivanov (Russia)

29 March 2005 Friendly	Republic of Ireland	1–0	China	Dublin, Ireland
	Morrison 83'	Report		Stadium: Lansdowne Road; Attendance: 35,000; Referee: Casha (Malta)

4 June 2005 2006 FIFA World Cup qualification	Republic of Ireland	2–2	Israel	Dublin, Ireland
	Harte 6'; Robbie Keane 11'	Report	Yehiel 39'; Nimni 45' (pen.)	Stadium: Lansdowne Road; Attendance: 36,000; Referee: Vassaras (Greece)

8 June 2005 2006 FIFA World Cup qualification	Faroe Islands	0–2	Republic of Ireland	Tórshavn, Faroe Islands
		Report	Harte 51' (pen.); Kilbane 58'	Stadium: Tórsvøllur; Attendance: 4,500; Referee: Guevnov (Bulgaria)

17 August 2005 Friendly	Republic of Ireland	1–2	Italy	Dublin, Ireland
	Andy Reid 32'	Report	Pirlo 10'; Gilardino 31'	Stadium: Lansdowne Road; Attendance: 44,000; Referee: Paulo Costa (Portugal)

7 September 2005 2006 FIFA World Cup qualification	Republic of Ireland	0–1	France	Dublin, Ireland
		Report	Henry 68'	Stadium: Lansdowne Road; Attendance: 36,000; Referee: Fandel (Germany)

8 October 2005 2006 FIFA World Cup qualification	Cyprus	0–1	Republic of Ireland	Nicosia, Cyprus
		Report	Elliott 6'	Stadium: Neo GSP Stadium; Attendance: 13,546; Referee: Kassai (Hungary)

12 October 2005 2006 FIFA World Cup qualification	Republic of Ireland	0–0	Switzerland	Dublin, Ireland
		Report		Stadium: Lansdowne Road; Attendance: 35,000; Referee: Merk (Germany)

=== 2006 ===
1 March 2006 Friendly	Republic of Ireland	3–0	Sweden	Dublin, Ireland
	Duff 35'; Robbie Keane 47'; Miller 70'	Report		Stadium: Lansdowne Road; Attendance: 48,000; Referee: Ledentu (France)

24 May 2006 Friendly	Republic of Ireland	0–1	Chile	Dublin, Ireland
		Report	Iturra 49'	Stadium: Lansdowne Road; Attendance: 41,200; Referee: Ingvarsson (Sweden)

16 August 2006 Friendly	Republic of Ireland	0–4	Netherlands	Dublin, Ireland
		Report	Huntelaar 25', 53'; Robben 41' van Persie 70'	Stadium: Lansdowne Road; Attendance: 42,400; Referee: Henning (Norway)

2 September 2006 UEFA Euro 2008 qualifying	Germany	1–0	Republic of Ireland	Stuttgart, Germany
20:45 UTC+2	Podolski 57'			Stadium: Gottlieb-Daimler-Stadion; Attendance: 53,198; Referee: Medina (Spain)

7 October 2006 UEFA Euro 2008 qualifying	Cyprus	5–2	Republic of Ireland	Nicosia, Cyprus
17:00 UTC+3	Konstantinou 10', 50' (pen.); Garpozis 16'; Charalambides 60', 75'		Ireland 8'; Richard Dunne 44'	Stadium: Neo GSP Stadium; Attendance: 12,000; Referee: Batista (Portugal)

11 October 2006 UEFA Euro 2008 qualifying	Republic of Ireland	1–1	Czech Republic	Dublin, Ireland
19:30 UTC+1	Kilbane 62'		Koller 64'	Stadium: Lansdowne Road; Attendance: 35,500; Referee: Layec (France)

15 November 2006 UEFA Euro 2008 qualifying	Republic of Ireland	5–0	San Marino	Dublin, Ireland
19:30 UTC+0	Andy Reid 7'; Doyle 24'; Robbie Keane 31', 58' (pen.), 85'			Stadium: Lansdowne Road; Referee: Isaksen (Faroe Islands)

=== 2007 ===
7 February 2007 UEFA Euro 2008 qualifying	San Marino	1–2	Republic of Ireland	Serravalle, San Marino
20:45 UTC+1	Manuel Marani 86'	Report	Kilbane 49'; Ireland 90+4'	Stadium: Stadio Olimpico; Referee: Rasmussen (Denmark)

24 March 2007 UEFA Euro 2008 qualifying	Republic of Ireland	1–0	Wales	Dublin, Ireland
15:00 UTC+0	Ireland 39'	Report		Stadium: Croke Park; Attendance: 72,539; Referee: Hauge (Norway)

28 March 2007 UEFA Euro 2008 qualifying	Republic of Ireland	1–0	Slovakia	Dublin, Ireland
19:30 UTC+1	Doyle 13'	Report		Stadium: Croke Park; Attendance: 71,297; Referee: Baskakov (Russia)

23 May 2007 Friendly	Ecuador	1–1	Republic of Ireland	East Rutherford, New Jersey, United States
20:00 UTC−4	Benítez 13'	Report	Doyle 44'	Stadium: Giants Stadium; Attendance: 20,823; Referee: Marruso (USA)

26 May 2007 Friendly	Bolivia	1–1	Republic of Ireland	Foxborough, Massachusetts, United States
15:00 UTC−4	Hoyos 12'	Report	Long 14'	Stadium: Gillette Stadium; Referee: Vaughn (USA)

22 August 2007 Friendly	Denmark	0–4	Republic of Ireland	Aarhus, Denmark
20:00 UTC+2		Report	Robbie Keane 29', 39'; Long 54', 65'	Stadium: NRGi Park; Attendance: 30,000; Referee: Einwaller (Austria)

8 September 2007 UEFA Euro 2008 qualifying	Slovakia	2–2	Republic of Ireland	Bratislava, Slovakia
20:30 UTC+2	Klimpl 38'; Čech 90'	Report	Ireland 7'; Doyle 58'	Stadium: Tehelné Pole; Attendance: 12,360; Referee: Farina (Italy)

12 September 2007 UEFA Euro 2008 qualifying	Czech Republic	1–0	Republic of Ireland	Prague, Czech Republic
20:30 UTC+2	Jankulovski 15'	Report		Stadium: AXA Arena; Attendance: 16,648; Referee: Vassaras (Greece)

13 October 2007 UEFA Euro 2008 qualifying	Republic of Ireland	0–0	Germany	Dublin, Ireland
19:45 UTC+1		Report		Stadium: Croke Park; Attendance: 67,495; Referee: Hansson (Sweden)

17 October 2007 UEFA Euro 2008 qualifying	Republic of Ireland	1–1	Cyprus	Dublin, Ireland
19:30 UTC+1	Finnan 90+3'	Report	Okkarides 80'	Stadium: Croke Park; Attendance: 45,500; Referee: Vuorela (Finland)

17 November 2007 UEFA Euro 2008 qualifying	Wales	2–2	Republic of Ireland	Cardiff, Wales
15:00 UTC+0	Koumas 23', 89' (pen.)	Report	Robbie Keane 31'; Doyle 60'	Stadium: Millennium Stadium; Attendance: 24,619; Referee: Oriekhov (Ukraine)

=== 2008 ===
6 February 2008 Friendly	Republic of Ireland	0–1	Brazil	Dublin, Ireland
19:45 UTC+0		Report	Robinho 67'	Stadium: Croke Park; Attendance: 70,000; Referee: Rogalla (Switzerland)

24 May 2008 Friendly	Republic of Ireland	1–1	Serbia	Dublin, Ireland
19:45 UTC+1	Keogh 90'		Pantelić 75'	Stadium: Croke Park; Attendance: 63,000; Referee: Evans (Wales)

29 May 2008 Friendly	Republic of Ireland	1–0	Colombia	London, England
20:00 UTC+1	Robbie Keane 3'			Stadium: Craven Cottage; Attendance: 18,612; Referee: Clattenburg (England)

20 August 2008 Friendly	Norway	1–1	Republic of Ireland	Oslo, Norway
18:00 UTC+2	Reginiussen 61'		Robbie Keane 44'	Stadium: Ullevaal Stadion; Attendance: 16,037; Referee: Whitby (Wales)

6 September 2008 2010 FIFA World Cup qualification	Georgia	1–2	Republic of Ireland	Mainz, Germany (Note: Originally scheduled for Tbilisi, Georgia but moved to neutral venue due to 2008 South Ossetia war.)
18:00 UTC+2	Levan Kenia 90'		Doyle 13'; Glenn Whelan 70'	Stadium: Stadion am Bruchweg; Attendance: 28,500; Referee: Szabo (Hungary)

10 September 2008 2010 FIFA World Cup qualification	Montenegro	0–0	Republic of Ireland	Podgorica, Montenegro
19:00 UTC+2				Stadium: Podgorica City Stadium; Attendance: 12,000; Referee: Kaldma (Estonia)

15 October 2008 2010 FIFA World Cup qualification	Republic of Ireland	1–0	Cyprus	Dublin, Ireland
19:45 UTC+1	Robbie Keane 5'			Stadium: Croke Park; Attendance: 53,500; Referee: Tudor (Romania)

19 November 2008 Friendly	Republic of Ireland	2–3	Poland	Dublin, Ireland
	Stephen Hunt 88' (pen.); Andrews 90'		Mariusz Lewandowski 3'; Guerreiro 47'; Robert Lewandowski 89'	Stadium: Croke Park; Attendance: 61,000; Referee: Jakobsson (Iceland)

=== 2009 ===
11 February 2009 2010 FIFA World Cup qualification	Republic of Ireland	2–1	Georgia	Dublin, Ireland
19:45 UTC+0	Robbie Keane 73' (pen.), 78'	Report	Iashvili 1'	Stadium: Croke Park; Attendance: 65,000; Referee: Hyytia (Finland)

28 March 2009 2010 FIFA World Cup qualification	Republic of Ireland	1–1	Bulgaria	Dublin, Ireland
19:45 UTC+0	Dunne 1'	Report	Kilbane 74' (o.g.)	Stadium: Croke Park; Attendance: 60,002; Referee: Bebek (Croatia)

1 April 2009 2010 FIFA World Cup qualification	Italy	1–1	Republic of Ireland	Bari, Italy
20:50 UTC+2	Iaquinta 10'	Report	Robbie Keane 87'	Stadium: Stadio San Nicola; Attendance: 41,000; Referee: Stark (Germany)

29 May 2009 Friendly	Republic of Ireland	1–1	Nigeria	London, England
	Robbie Keane 38'		Enemaro 30'	Stadium: Craven Cottage; Attendance: 11,263; Referee: Collum (Scotland)

6 June 2009 2010 FIFA World Cup qualification	Bulgaria	1–1	Republic of Ireland	Sofia, Bulgaria
20:30 UTC+3	Telkiyski 31'	Report	Dunne 24'	Stadium: Vasil Levski National Stadium; Attendance: 42,000; Referee: Larsen (Denmark)

12 August 2009 Friendly	Republic of Ireland	0–3	Australia	Limerick, Ireland
			Cahill 38', 44'; Carney 90'	Stadium: Thomond Park; Attendance: 19,000; Referee: Burrull (Spain)

5 September 2009 2010 FIFA World Cup qualification	Cyprus	1–2	Republic of Ireland	Nicosia, Cyprus
21:30 UTC+3	Elia 30'	Report	Doyle 5'; Robbie Keane 83'	Stadium: Neo GSP Stadium; Attendance: 7,000; Referee: Einwaller (Austria)

8 September 2009 Friendly	Republic of Ireland	1–0	South Africa	Limerick, Ireland
	Lawrence 37'	Report		Stadium: Thomond Park; Attendance: 11,300; Referee: Thomson (Scotland)

10 October 2009 2010 FIFA World Cup qualification	Republic of Ireland	2–2	Italy	Dublin, Ireland
20:00 UTC+1	Glenn Whelan 8'; St Ledger 87'	Report	Camoranesi 26'; Gilardino 90'	Stadium: Croke Park; Attendance: 70,670; Referee: Hauge (Norway)

14 October 2009 2010 FIFA World Cup qualification	Republic of Ireland	0–0	Montenegro	Dublin, Ireland
19:00 UTC+1		Report		Stadium: Croke Park; Attendance: 50,212; Referee: Hrinak (Slovakia)

14 November 2009 2010 FIFA World Cup qualification play-off	Republic of Ireland	0–1	France	Dublin, Ireland
20:00 UTC+0		Report	Anelka 72'	Stadium: Croke Park; Attendance: 74,103; Referee: Byrch (Germany)

18 November 2009 2010 FIFA World Cup qualification play-off	France	1–1 (a.e.t.) (2–1 agg.)	Republic of Ireland	Saint-Denis, France
21:00 UTC+1	Gallas 103'	Report	Robbie Keane 33'	Stadium: Stade de France; Attendance: 81,000; Referee: Hansson (Sweden)
