= Armin Krings =

Luxembourgish footballer

Personal information
- Date of birth: 22 November 1962 (age 63)
- Place of birth: Mönchengladbach
- Position: Forward

Youth career
- –1981: Borussia Mönchengladbach

Senior career*
Years	Team	Apps	(Gls)
1981–1995	Avenir Beggen	323	(247)
1995–1996	FC Mondercange	23	(13)
1996–1997	Avenir Beggen	24	(8)

International career
1987–1991	Luxembourg	14	(1)
- * Club domestic league appearances and goals

Armin Krings (born 22 November 1962) is a Luxembourgish retired football striker. He became Luxembourg National Division top goalscorer 7 times, among others in 1988–89 and 1992–93.

== Club career ==
He scored a record 255 goals in 347 Luxembourg National Division matches for Avenir Beggen and also played a season for second-level FC Mondercange.

== International career ==
Krings made his debut for Luxembourg in a September 1987 European Championship qualification match away against Ireland and earned a total of 14 caps (1 goal, scored in his debut). His final international was another EC qualifier, away against Wales in November 1991.
