= 1987–88 UEFA Cup =

17th season of Europe's secondary club football tournament organised by UEFA

Tournament details
- Dates: 15 September 1987 – 18 May 1988
- Teams: 64

Final positions
- Champions: (West Germany) Bayer Leverkusen (1st title)
- Runners-up: (Spain) Espanyol

Tournament statistics
- Matches played: 126
- Goals scored: 308 (2.44 per match)
- Attendance: 2,624,317 (20,828 per match)
- Top scorer(s): Kenneth Brylle Larsen (Club Brugge); Kálmán Kovács (Honved); Dimitris Saravakos (Panathinaikos); 6 goals each

The 1987–88 UEFA Cup was the 17th season of the UEFA Cup, the secondary club football competition organised by the Union of European Football Associations (UEFA). The final was played over two legs at the Estadi de Sarriá, Barcelona, Spain, and at Ulrich-Haberland Stadion, Leverkusen, Germany. The competition was won by Bayer Leverkusen of Germany, who defeated Español of Spain on penalty kicks with an aggregate result of 3–3.

In only their second season of European football, Bayer Leverkusen earned their first major title in professional competition. This was also the second UEFA Cup final decided on penalty kicks, four years after the first one. This was the third season in which all English clubs were banned from European football competitions

== Association team allocation ==
A total of 64 teams from 31 UEFA member associations participated in the 1987–88 UEFA Cup, all entering from the first round over six knock-out rounds. The association ranking based on the UEFA country coefficients is used to determine the number of participating teams for each association:

- Associations 1–3 each have four teams qualify.
- Associations 4–8 each have three teams qualify.
- Associations 9–21 each have two teams qualify.
- Associations 22–32 each have one team qualify.

Due to the ongoing ban on English clubs, their three berths were allocated to associations 9–11, each gaining a third berth.

=== Association ranking ===
For the 1987–88 UEFA Cup, the associations are allocated places according to their 1986 UEFA country coefficients, which takes into account their performance in European competitions from 1981–82 to 1985–86.

Association ranking for 1987–88 UEFA Cup

Rank	Association	Coeff.	Teams	Notes
1	Italy	39.466	4	
2	West Germany	37.332	4	
3	Soviet Union	36.516	4	
4	Belgium	34.500	3	
5	Spain	33.199	3	
6	England	33.093	0	
7	Scotland	31.200	3	
8	(Socialist Federal Republic of Yugoslavia) Yugoslavia	29.150	3	
9	Portugal	29.100	3	
10	Austria	26.500	3	
11	Romania	23.166	3	
12	Sweden	22.000	2	
13	Czechoslovakia	21.700	2	
14	East Germany	19.400	2	
15	France	18.200	2	
16	Switzerland	17.750	2	
17	Greece	16.666	2	

Rank	Association	Coeff.	Teams	Notes
18	Hungary	16.500	2	
19	Netherlands	15.983	2	
20	Poland	14.500	2	
21	Bulgaria	13.166	2	
-	Wales	11.000	0	
22	Finland	9.664	1	
23	Denmark	8.249	1	
24	Albania	7.500	1	
25	Turkey	6.999	1	
26	Cyprus	5.999	1	
27	Norway	5.666	1	
28	(Republic of Ireland) Republic of Ireland	5.665	1	
29	(Northern Ireland) Northern Ireland	5.331	1	
30	Iceland	3.665	1	
31	Malta	1.666	1	
32	Luxembourg	1.332	1	

England: Since the Heysel Stadium disaster in 1985, all English football clubs were placed under an indefinite ban by Union of European Football Associations (UEFA) from all European competitions, which would be lifted in 1990–91. As the first year of the ban had been tabulated, England fell down to sixth in the UEFA rankings, which reduced the number of re-allocated UEFA Cup berths for 1987–88 to three. These were transferred as a third berth for associations 9–11, namely Portugal, Austria and Romania. Liverpool, Tottenham Hotspur and League Cup winners Arsenal would have qualified by league position. Had England retained a fourth European place, Norwich City would have also qualified.
Wales: There was no national league in Wales before 1992 and the only competition organised by the Football Association of Wales was the Welsh Cup so Wales had just a single participant in European competitions, the winner (or best placed Welsh team as several English teams also competed) of the Welsh Cup which competed in the UEFA Cup Winners' Cup. Its virtual ranking is only an original research, because the UEFA country ranking was only used to allocate the UEFA Cup spots at time, so Wales was not included.

=== Teams ===
The labels in parentheses show how each team qualified for competition:

- TH: Title holders
- CW: Cup winners
- CR: Cup runners-up
- LC: League Cup winners
- 2nd, 3rd, 4th, 5th, 6th, etc.: League position
- P-W: End-of-season European competition play-offs winners

Qualified teams for 1987–88 UEFA Cup
(Italy) Juventus (2nd)	(Italy) Internazionale (3rd)	(Italy) Hellas Verona (4th)	(Italy) Milan (P-W)
(West Germany) Borussia Mönchengladbach (3rd)	(West Germany) Borussia Dortmund (4th)	(West Germany) Werder Bremen (5th)	(West Germany) Bayer Leverkusen (6th)
(Soviet Union) Dynamo Moscow (2nd)	(Soviet Union) Spartak Moscow (3rd)	(Soviet Union) Zenit (4th)	(Soviet Union) Dinamo Tbilisi (5th)
(Belgium) Club Brugge (3rd)	(Belgium) Lokeren (4th)	(Belgium) Beveren (5th)	(Spain) Barcelona (2nd)
(Spain) Español (3rd)	(Spain) Sporting Gijón (4th)	(Scotland) Celtic (2nd)	(Scotland) Dundee United (3rd)
(Scotland) Aberdeen (4th)	(Socialist Federal Republic of Yugoslavia) Partizan (1st)	(Socialist Federal Republic of Yugoslavia) Velež Mostar (2nd)	(Socialist Federal Republic of Yugoslavia) Red Star Belgrade (3rd)
(Portugal) Vitória de Guimarães (3rd)	(Portugal) Chaves (5th)	(Portugal) Belenenses (6th)	Austria Wien (2nd)
(Austria) LASK (4th)	(Austria) Admira/Wacker (5th)	(Romania) Victoria București (3rd)	(Romania) Sportul Studențesc (4th)
(Romania) Universitatea Craiova (5th)	(Sweden) AIK (2nd)	(Sweden) IFK Göteborg (3rd)^{TH}	(Czechoslovakia) TJ Vítkovice (2nd)
(Czechoslovakia) Bohemians (3rd)	(East Germany) Dynamo Dresden (2nd)	(East Germany) Wismut Aue (4th)	(France) Toulouse (3rd)
(France) Auxerre (4th)	(Switzerland) Grasshopper (2nd)	(Switzerland) Sion (3rd)	(Greece) Panathinaikos (2nd)
(Greece) Panionios (4th)	(Hungary) Tatabányai Bányász (3rd)	(Hungary) Budapesti Honvéd (4th)	(Netherlands) Feyenoord (3rd)
(Netherlands) Utrecht (P-W)	(Poland) Pogoń Szczecin (2nd)	(Poland) GKS Katowice (3rd)	(Bulgaria) Trakia Plovdiv (3rd)
(Bulgaria) Lokomotiv Sofia (4th)	(Finland) TPS (2nd)	(Denmark) Brøndby (2nd)	(Albania) Flamurtari (2nd)
(Turkey) Beşiktaş (2nd)	(Cyprus) EPA Larnaca (3rd)	(Norway) Mjøndalen (2nd)	(Republic of Ireland) Bohemian (3rd)
(Northern Ireland) Coleraine (2nd)	(Iceland) Valur (2nd)	(Malta) Valletta (2nd)	Spora Luxembourg (3rd)

Notes

1. Yugoslavia: Partizan finished the 1986-87 Yugoslav First League in second place behind Vardar, because of a six-point deduction. This was imposed to 12 different teams, Vardar not among them, at the end of the previous season due to allegations of match fixing that resulted in the final matchday being voided and replayed. After an appeal, the Yugoslav Constitutional Court reversed both rulings on 29 July 1987, proclaiming Partizan as champions of the 1986-87 season and demoting Vardar to fifth place, which would have left them out of European competition in benefit of the fourth placed team Rijeka. However, the draw for the European Cup had already been conducted, and Vardar remained in the tournament, with Partizan competing in the UEFA Cup instead.
2. Cyprus: APOEL finished 2nd in the 1986–87 Cypriot First Division, but it was disqualified from any UEFA competition for one year due to its withdrawal against Besiktas J.K. in the second round of the 1986–87 European Cup, which was imposed by the Cypriot government over the Cyprus problem. The third team of the table, EPA Larnaca, took APOEL's place in the UEFA Cup.

== Schedule ==
The schedule of the competition was as follows. Matches were scheduled for Wednesdays, though some matches exceptionally took place on Tuesdays, Thursdays or Saturdays.

Schedule for 1987–88 UEFA Cup
Round	First leg	Second leg
First round	16–17 September 1987	30 September 1987
Second round	21–24 October 1987	3–4 November 1987
Third round	25 November 1987	9 December 1987
Quarter-finals	2 March 1988	16 March 1988
Semi-finals	6 April 1988	20 April 1988
Final	4 May 1988	18 May 1988

== First round ==
Team 1	Agg.	Team 2	1st leg	2nd leg
Beşiktaş (Turkey)	1–3	(Italy) Internazionale	0–0	1–3
Bohemian (Republic of Ireland)	0–1	(Scotland) Aberdeen	0–0	0–1
Borussia Mönchengladbach (West Germany)	1–5	(Spain) Español	0–1	1–4
Brøndby (Denmark)	2–1	(Sweden) IFK Göteborg	2–1	0–0
Budapesti Honvéd (Hungary)	1–0	(Belgium) Lokeren	1–0	0–0
Celtic (Scotland)	2–3	(West Germany) Borussia Dortmund	2–1	0–2
Coleraine (Northern Ireland)	1–4	(Scotland) Dundee United	0–1	1–3
EPA Larnaca (Cyprus)	0–4	(Romania) Victoria București	0–1	0–3
Barcelona (Spain)	2–1	(Portugal) Belenenses	2–0	0–1
Wismut Aue (East Germany)	1–1 (a)	(Iceland) Valur	0–0	1–1
Spartak Moscow (Soviet Union)	3–1	(East Germany) Dynamo Dresden	3–0	0–1
Universitatea Craiova (Romania)	4–4 (a)	(Portugal) Chaves	3–2	1–2
TJ Vítkovice (Czechoslovakia)	3–1	(Sweden) AIK	1–1	2–0
Zenit (Soviet Union)	2–5	(Belgium) Club Brugge	2–0	0–5
Feyenoord (Netherlands)	10–2	Spora Luxembourg	5–0	5–2
Austria Wien	1–5	(West Germany) Bayer Leverkusen	0–0	1–5
Grasshopper (Switzerland)	0–5	(Soviet Union) Dynamo Moscow	0–4	0–1
Beveren (Belgium)	2–1	(Czechoslovakia) Bohemians	2–0	0–1
Flamurtari (Albania)	3–2	(Socialist Federal Republic of Yugoslavia) Partizan	2–0	1–2
Linzer ASK (Austria)	0–2	(Netherlands) Utrecht	0–0	0–2
Mjøndalen (Norway)	1–5	(West Germany) Werder Bremen	0–5	1–0
Panathinaikos (Greece)	4–3	(France) Auxerre	2–0	2–3
Lokomotiv Sofia (Bulgaria)	3–4	(Soviet Union) Dinamo Tbilisi	3–1	0–3
Pogoń Szczecin (Poland)	2–4	(Italy) Hellas Verona	1–1	1–3
Red Star Belgrade (Socialist Federal Republic of Yugoslavia)	5–2	(Bulgaria) Trakia Plovdiv	3–0	2–2
Sporting Gijón (Spain)	1–3	(Italy) Milan	1–0	0–3
Sportul Studențesc (Romania)	3–1	(Poland) GKS Katowice	1–0	2–1
Tatabányai Bányász (Hungary)	1–2	(Portugal) Vitória de Guimarães	1–1	0–1
Toulouse (France)	6–1	(Greece) Panionios	5–1	1–0
TPS (Finland)	2–1	(Austria) Admira/Wacker	0–1	2–0
Valletta (Malta)	0–7	(Italy) Juventus	0–4	0–3
Velež Mostar (Socialist Federal Republic of Yugoslavia)	5–3	(Switzerland) Sion	5–0	0–3

=== First leg ===
16 September 1987

Beşiktaş (Turkey)	0–0	(Italy) Internazionale
	Report

İnönü Stadium, Istanbul
Attendance: 20,000
Referee: Klaus Peschel (East Germany)

16 September 1987

Bohemian (Republic of Ireland)	0–0	(Scotland) Aberdeen
	Report

Dalymount Park, Dublin
Attendance: 7,500
Referee: Frans Van Den Wijngaert (Belgium)

16 September 1987

Borussia Mönchengladbach (West Germany)	0–1	(Spain) Español
	Report	Pineda 34'

Bökelbergstadion, Mönchengladbach
Attendance: 18,500
Referee: Michel Vautrot (France)

16 September 1987
19:00 CET

Brøndby IF (Denmark)	2–1	(Sweden) IFK Göteborg
C. Nielsen 33'; Christensen 80'	Report	L. Nilsson 77'

Københavns Idrætspark, Copenhagen
Attendance: 29,600
Referee: George Smith (Scotland)

16 September 1987

Budapesti Honvéd (Hungary)	1–0	(Belgium) Lokeren
Fodor 53'	Report

Bozsik József Stadion, Budapest
Attendance: 3,262
Referee: Giorgos Koukoulakis (Greece)

16 September 1987

Celtic (Scotland)	2–1	(West Germany) Borussia Dortmund
Walker 4'; Whyte 88'	Report	Mill 64'

Celtic Park, Glasgow
Attendance: 39,414
Referee: Bep Thomas (Netherlands)

16 September 1987

Coleraine (Northern Ireland)	0–1	(Scotland) Dundee United
	Report	Sturrock 39'

The Showgrounds, Coleraine
Attendance: 7,900
Referee: Frangcon Roberts (Wales)

16 September 1987

EPA Larnaca (Cyprus)	0–1	(Romania) Victoria București
	Report	Ene 51'

GSZ Stadium, Larnaca
Attendance: 1,781
Referee: Antal Huták (Hungary)

16 September 1987

Barcelona (Spain)	2–0	(Portugal) Belenenses
Moratalla 87'; Víctor 90'	Report

Estadi del Futbol Club Barcelona, Barcelona
Attendance: 23,000
Referee: Horst Brummeier (Austria)

16 September 1987

Wismut Aue (East Germany)	0–0	(Iceland) Valur
	Report

Otto-Grotewohl-Stadion, Aue
Attendance: 16,000
Referee: Ivan Timoshenko (Soviet Union)

16 September 1987

Spartak Moscow (Soviet Union)	3–0	(East Germany) Dynamo Dresden
Mostovoi 32', 80'; Cherenkov 57'	Report

Central Dynamo Stadium, Moscow
Attendance: 48,000
Referee: Einar Halle (Norway)

16 September 1987

Universitatea Craiova (Romania)	3–2	(Portugal) Chaves
Ciurea 63' (pen.); Vancea 65'; Ghiță 85'	Report	Gilberto 19'; Vermelhinho 52'

Stadionul Central, Craiova
Attendance: 21,000
Referee: Yusuf Namoğlu (Turkey)

16 September 1987

TJ Vítkovice (Czechoslovakia)	1–1	(Sweden) AIK
Stařičný 77'	Report	Kindvall 52'

Bazaly, Ostrava
Attendance: 3,919
Referee: Hubert Forstinger (Austria)

16 September 1987

Zenit (Soviet Union)	2–0	(Belgium) Club Brugge
Chukhlov 8'; Zheludkov 70'	Report

Kirov Stadium, Leningrad
Attendance: 32,000
Referee: Joe Worrall (England)

16 September 1987

Feyenoord (Netherlands)	5–0	Spora Luxembourg
Blinker 16'; Mitchell 37', 60'; Van Herpen 74'; Elstrup 77'	Report

De Kuip, Rotterdam
Attendance: 7,114
Referee: Patrick Daly (Republic of Ireland)

16 September 1987

Austria Wien	0–0	(West Germany) Bayer Leverkusen
	Report

Praterstadion, Vienna
Attendance: 11,125
Referee: John Blankenstein (Netherlands)

16 September 1987

Grasshopper (Switzerland)	0–4	(Soviet Union) Dynamo Moscow
	Report	Borodyuk 23', 45' (pen.), 57'; Karatayev 79'

Hardturm, Zürich
Attendance: 8,900
Referee: José Pérez Sánchez (Spain)

16 September 1987

Beveren (Belgium)	2–0	(Czechoslovakia) Bohemians
Fairclough 16', 53'	Report

Freethiel, Beveren
Attendance: 4,469
Referee: Alder dos Santos (Portugal)

16 September 1987

Flamurtari (Albania)	2–0	(Socialist Federal Republic of Yugoslavia) Partizan
Đorđević 30' (o.g.); Iljadhi 83'	Report

Flamurtari Stadium, Vlorë
Attendance: 12,200
Referee: Georges Sandoz (Switzerland)

16 September 1987
19:00

Linzer ASK (Austria)	0–0	(Netherlands) Utrecht
	Report

Linzer Stadion, Linz
Attendance: 3,500
Referee: Todor Kolev (Bulgaria)

16 September 1987

Mjøndalen (Norway)	0–5	(West Germany) Werder Bremen
	Report	Riedle 6', 87'; Ordenewitz 52'; Sauer 55'; Wolter 64'

Nedre Eiken Stadion, Mjøndalen
Attendance: 2,108
Referee: Simo Ruokonen (Finland)

16 September 1987

Panathinaikos (Greece)	2–0	(France) Auxerre
Barret 9' (o.g.); Vlachos 51'	Report

Ο.Α.Κ.Α., Athens
Attendance: 60,216
Referee: Siegfried Kirschen (East Germany)

16 September 1987

Pogoń Szczecin (Poland)	1–1	(Italy) Hellas Verona
Leśniak 59'	Report	Elkjær 8'

Stadion Florian Krygier, Szczecin
Attendance: 17,994
Referee: Bo Karlsson (Sweden)

16 September 1987

Red Star Belgrade (Socialist Federal Republic of Yugoslavia)	3–0	(Bulgaria) Trakia Plovdiv
Radovanović 57'; Šabanadžović 60'; Cvetković 61'	Report

Marakana, Belgrade
Attendance: 19,090
Referee: Stefan Petrescu (Romania)

16 September 1987

Sporting Gijón (Spain)	1–0	(Italy) Milan
Jaime 70'	Report

El Molinón, Gijón
Attendance: 18,000
Referee: Ron Bridges (Wales)

16 September 1987

Sportul Studențesc (Romania)	1–0	(Poland) GKS Katowice
Țârlea 46'	Report

Stadionul Regie, Bucharest
Attendance: 7,900
Referee: Zdeněk Havlíček (Czechoslovakia)

16 September 1987

Tatabányai Bányász (Hungary)	1–1	(Portugal) Vitória de Guimarães
Plotár 41'	Report	Caio 78'

Városi Stadion, Tatabánya
Attendance: 3,281
Referee: Özcan Oal (Turkey)

16 September 1987

Toulouse (France)	5–1	(Greece) Panionios
Passi 8'; Stopyra 26'; Rocheteau 48'; Márcico 52', 87' (pen.)	Report	Aposporis 64'

Stadium Municipal, Toulouse
Attendance: 25,438
Referee: Werner Föckler (West Germany)

16 September 1987

TPS (Finland)	0–1	(Austria) Admira/Wacker
	Report	Rodax 14'

Kupittaan jalkapallostadion, Turku
Attendance: 1,783
Referee: Bo Helén (Sweden)

16 September 1987

Valletta (Malta)	0–4	(Italy) Juventus
	Report	Laudrup 26', 42'; Alessio 37', 70'

National Stadium, Ta' Qali
Attendance: 11,000
Referee: John Martin (England)

16 September 1987

Velež Mostar (Socialist Federal Republic of Yugoslavia)	5–0	(Switzerland) Sion
Tuce 17', 32', 37', 61' (pen.); Šišić 60'	Report

Stadion pod Bijelim Brijegom, Mostar
Attendance: 14,500
Referee: Dušan Krchňák (Czechoslovakia)

17 September 1987

Lokomotiv Sofia (Bulgaria)	3–1	(Soviet Union) Dinamo Tbilisi
Zlatinov 45' (pen.); Stoev 61' (pen.); Todorov 84'	Report	Shengelia 75'

Lokomotiv, Sofia
Attendance: 12,500
Referee: Vaso Vujović (Yugoslavia)

=== Second leg ===
30 September 1987

Internazionale (Italy)	3–1	(Turkey) Beşiktaş
Altobelli 38'; Serena 44', 86'	Report	Feyyaz 14'

San Siro, Milan
Attendance: 19,830
Referee: Gérard Biguet (France)

Internazionale won 3–1 on aggregate.

30 September 1987

Aberdeen (Scotland)	1–0	(Republic of Ireland) Bohemian
Bett 2' (pen.)	Report

Pittodrie Stadium, Aberdeen
Attendance: 14,510
Referee: Egil Nervik (Norway)

Aberdeen won 1–0 on aggregate.

30 September 1987

Español (Spain)	4–1	(West Germany) Borussia Mönchengladbach
Valverde 30'; Iñaki 45'; Golobart 49'; Pineda 54'	Report	Rahn 59'

Sarriá, Barcelona
Attendance: 14,800
Referee: George Courtney (England)

Español won 5–1 on aggregate.

30 September 1987

IFK Göteborg (Sweden)	0–0	(Denmark) Brøndby
	Report

Ullevi, Gothenburg
Attendance: 25,718
Referee: Yuri Savchenko (Soviet Union)

Brøndby won 2–1 on aggregate.

30 September 1987

Lokeren (Belgium)	0–0	(Hungary) Budapesti Honvéd
	Report

Daknamstadion, Lokeren
Attendance: 5,942
Referee: David Syme (Scotland)

Budapesti Honvéd won 1–0 on aggregate.

30 September 1987

Borussia Dortmund (West Germany)	2–0	(Scotland) Celtic
Dickel 74', 86'	Report

Westfalenstadion, Dortmund
Attendance: 53,500
Referee: Rosario Lo Bello (Italy)

Borussia Dortmund won 3–2 on aggregate.

30 September 1987

Dundee United (Scotland)	3–1	(Northern Ireland) Coleraine
Gallacher 28'; Sturrock 73'; Clark 80'	Report	Edgar 48'

Tannadice Park, Dundee
Attendance: 8,430
Referee: Allan Gunn (England)

Dundee United won 4–1 on aggregate.

30 September 1987

Victoria București (Romania)	3–0	(Cyprus) EPA Larnaca
Nuță 32', 61' (pen.); Augustin 82'	Report

Stadionul Victoria, Bucharest
Attendance: 1,800
Referee: Plarent Kotherja (Albania)

Victoria București won 4–0 on aggregate.

30 September 1987

Belenenses (Portugal)	1–0	(Spain) Barcelona
Mapuata 4'	Report

Estádio do Restelo, Lisbon
Attendance: 9,641
Referee: Kurt Röthlisberger (Switzerland)

Barcelona won 2–1 on aggregate.

30 September 1987

Valur (Iceland)	1–1	(East Germany) Wismut Aue
J. Jónsson 11'	Report	Weiß 81' (pen.)

Laugardalsvöllur, Reykjavík
Attendance: 1,673
Referee: Lucien Kayser (Luxembourg)

1–1 on aggregate; Wismut Aue won on away goals.

30 September 1987

Dynamo Dresden (East Germany)	1–0	(Soviet Union) Spartak Moscow
Minge 8'	Report

Dynamo-Stadion, Dresden
Attendance: 25,797
Referee: Egbert Mulder (Netherlands)

Spartak Moscow won 3–1 on aggregate.

30 September 1987

Chaves (Portugal)	2–1	(Romania) Universitatea Craiova
Slavkov 5'; Vermelhinho 62'	Report	Ghiță 83'

Estádio Municipal de Chaves, Chaves
Attendance: 9,500
Referee: Oliver Donnelly (Northern Ireland)

4–4 on aggregate; Chaves won on away goals.

30 September 1987

AIK (Sweden)	0–2	(Czechoslovakia) TJ Vítkovice
	Report	Dostál 61'; Houška 77'

Råsunda fotbollsstadion, Solna
Attendance: 2,109
Referee: James Duncan (Scotland)

TJ Vítkovice won 3–1 on aggregate.

30 September 1987

Club Brugge (Belgium)	5–0	(Soviet Union) Zenit
Brylle 20', 39', 59', 69'; Ceulemans 44'	Report

Olympiastadion, Bruges
Attendance: 18,648
Referee: Alain Delmer (France)

Club Brugge won 5–2 on aggregate.

30 September 1987

Spora Luxembourg	2–5	(Netherlands) Feyenoord
Di Domenico 28'; Jeitz 42'	Report	Elstrup 24' (pen.), 80'; Hoekstra 61'; Wijnstekers 62'; Heus 65'

Stade Camille Polfer, Luxembourg City
Attendance: 657
Referee: Jean-Marie Lartigot (France)

Feyenoord won 10–2 on aggregate.

30 September 1987

Bayer Leverkusen (West Germany)	5–1	Austria Wien
Rolff 24', 60'; Schreier 46'; Hörster 57'; Cha Bum-kun 74'	Report	Webora 31'

Ulrich-Haberland-Stadion, Leverkusen
Attendance: 11,500
Referee: Alphonse Costantin (Belgium)

Bayer Leverkusen won 5–1 on aggregate.

30 September 1987

Dynamo Moscow (Soviet Union)	1–0	(Switzerland) Grasshopper
Vasilyev 33'	Report

Central Dynamo Stadium, Moscow
Attendance: 16,300
Referee: Manfred Neuner (West Germany)

Dynamo Moscow won 5–0 on aggregate.

30 September 1987

Bohemians (Czechoslovakia)	1–0	(Belgium) Beveren
Chaloupka 11'	Report

Ďolíček, Prague
Attendance: 3,627
Referee: Karl-Josef Assenmacher (West Germany)

Beveren won 2–1 on aggregate.

30 September 1987

Partizan (Socialist Federal Republic of Yugoslavia)	2–1	(Albania) Flamurtari
Stevanović 44' (pen.); Vokrri 60'	Report	Kushta 82'

Stadion JNA, Belgrade
Attendance: 32,000
Referee: Andrzej Libich (Poland)

Flamurtari won 3–2 on aggregate.

30 September 1987
19:30

Utrecht (Netherlands)	2–0	(Austria) Linzer ASK
Van Loen 22'; Steinmann 48'	Report

Stadion Galgenwaard, Utrecht
Attendance: 16,500
Referee: Adolf Prokop (East Germany)

Utrecht won 2–0 on aggregate.

30 September 1987

Werder Bremen (West Germany)	0–1	(Norway) Mjøndalen
	Report	Markussen 78'

Weserstadion, Bremen
Attendance: 12,000
Referee: Fred McKnight (Northern Ireland)

Werder Bremen won 5–1 on aggregate.

30 September 1987

Auxerre (France)	3–2	(Greece) Panathinaikos
Dutuel 23'; Cantona 41'; Courtet 73'	Report	Vasiliou 31'; Saravakos 44'

Stade de l'Abbé-Deschamps, Auxerre
Attendance: 15,953
Referee: Luigi Agnolin (Italy)

Panathinaikos won 4–3 on aggregate.

30 September 1987

Dinamo Tbilisi (Soviet Union)	3–0	(Bulgaria) Lokomotiv Sofia
Sulakvelidze 41'; Guruli 73'; Chivadze 79'	Report

Lenin Dinamo Stadium, Tbilisi
Attendance: 60,000
Referee: Robert Matušík (Czechoslovakia)

Dinamo Tbilisi won 4–3 on aggregate.

30 September 1987

Hellas Verona (Italy)	3–1	(Poland) Pogoń Szczecin
Elkjær 32', 39' (pen.); Di Gennaro 43' (pen.)	Report	Hawrylewicz 82'

Stadio Marcantonio Bentegodi, Verona
Attendance: 29,751
Referee: José Veiga Trigo (Portugal)

Hellas Verona won 4–2 on aggregate.

30 September 1987

Trakia Plovdiv (Bulgaria)	2–2	(Socialist Federal Republic of Yugoslavia) Red Star Belgrade
Pashev 55' (pen.); Georgiev 66'	Report	Đurović 11'; Binić 82'

Stadion Hristo Botev, Plovdiv
Attendance: 25,000
Referee: Gerasimos Germanakos (Greece)

Red Star Belgrade won 5–2 on aggregate.

30 September 1987

Milan (Italy)	3–0	(Spain) Sporting Gijón
Virdis 20' (pen.), 45' (pen.); Gullit 43'	Report

Stadio Via del Mare, Lecce
Attendance: 35,488
Referee: Zoran Petrović (Yugoslavia)

Milan won 3–1 on aggregate. The game was played in Lecce because of the ban on San Siro.

30 September 1987

GKS Katowice (Poland)	1–2	(Romania) Sportul Studențesc
Koniarek 31'	Report	Țârlea 22'; Cristea 28'

Stadion Śląski, Chorzów
Attendance: 10,150
Referee: Henning Lund-Sørensen (Denmark)

Sportul Studențesc won 3–1 on aggregate.

30 September 1987

Vitória de Guimarães (Portugal)	1–0	(Hungary) Tatabányai Bányász
Kioma 71'	Report

Estádio D. Afonso Henriques, Guimarães
Attendance: 12,000
Referee: John Lloyd (Wales)

Vitória de Guimarães won 2–1 on aggregate.

30 September 1987

Panionios (Greece)	0–1	(France) Toulouse
	Report	Rocheteau 57'

Stadio Neas Smyrnis, Athens
Attendance: 3,269
Referee: Tullio Lanese (Italy)

Toulouse won 6–1 on aggregate.

30 September 1987

Admira/Wacker (Austria)	0–2	(Finland) TPS
	Report	Aaltonen 39', 75'

Bundesstadion Südstadt, Maria Enzersdorf
Attendance: 1,300
Referee: Lajos Hartmann (Hungary)

TPS won 2–1 on aggregate.

30 September 1987

Juventus (Italy)	3–0	(Malta) Valletta
Magrin 23'; Vignola 60'; Rush 87'	Report

Stadio Comunale Vittorio Pozzo, Turin
Attendance: 3,528
Referee: Michalakis Antoniou (Cyprus)

Juventus won 7–0 on aggregate.

30 September 1987

Sion (Switzerland)	3–0	(Socialist Federal Republic of Yugoslavia) Velež Mostar
Brigger 4'; Bouderbala 7'; Balet 22'	Report

Stade de Tourbillon, Sion
Attendance: 3,960
Referee: Alexis Ponnet (Belgium)

Velež Mostar won 5–3 on aggregate.

== Second round ==
Team 1	Agg.	Team 2	1st leg	2nd leg
Milan (Italy)	0–2	(Spain) Español	0–2	0–0
Aberdeen (Scotland)	2–2 (a)	(Netherlands) Feyenoord	2–1	0–1
Borussia Dortmund (West Germany)	3–2	(Socialist Federal Republic of Yugoslavia) Velež Mostar	2–0	1–2
Brøndby (Denmark)	3–3 (0–3 p)	(Romania) Sportul Studențesc	3–0	0–3 (a.e.t.)
Chaves (Portugal)	2–5	(Hungary) Budapesti Honvéd	1–2	1–3
Dundee United (Scotland)	2–3	(Czechoslovakia) TJ Vítkovice	1–2	1–1
Utrecht (Netherlands)	2–3	(Italy) Hellas Verona	1–1	1–2
Barcelona (Spain)	2–0	(Soviet Union) Dynamo Moscow	2–0	0–0
Wismut Aue (East Germany)	1–2	(Albania) Flamurtari	1–0	0–2
Spartak Moscow (Soviet Union)	6–7	(West Germany) Werder Bremen	4–1	2–6 (a.e.t.)
Internazionale (Italy)	2–1	(Finland) TPS	0–1	2–0
Panathinaikos (Greece)	3–3 (a)	(Italy) Juventus	1–0	2–3
Red Star Belgrade (Socialist Federal Republic of Yugoslavia)	3–5	(Belgium) Club Brugge	3–1	0–4
Toulouse (France)	1–2	(West Germany) Bayer Leverkusen	1–1	0–1
Victoria București (Romania)	1–2	(Soviet Union) Dinamo Tbilisi	1–2	0–0
Vitória de Guimarães (Portugal)	1–1 (5–4 p)	(Belgium) Beveren	1–0	0–1 (a.e.t.)

=== First leg ===
21 October 1987

Milan (Italy)	0–2	(Spain) Español
	Report	Zubillaga 40'; Alonso 49'

Stadio Via del Mare, Lecce
Attendance: 29,102
Referee: David Syme (Scotland)

21 October 1987

Aberdeen (Scotland)	2–1	(Netherlands) Feyenoord
Falconer 34'; J. Miller 68'	Report	Elstrup 21' (pen.)

Pittodrie Stadium, Aberdeen
Attendance: 16,000
Referee: Erik Fredriksson (Sweden)

21 October 1987

Borussia Dortmund (West Germany)	2–0	(Socialist Federal Republic of Yugoslavia) Velež Mostar
Hupe 68'; Dickel 86'	Report

Westfalenstadion, Dortmund
Attendance: 41,582
Referee: José Rosa dos Santos (Portugal)

21 October 1987

Brøndby (Denmark)	3–0	(Romania) Sportul Studențesc
Olsen 16'; Steffensen 30' (pen.); Christensen 86'	Report

Brøndby Stadion, Brøndbyvester
Attendance: 18,700
Referee: Roger Philippi (Luxembourg)

21 October 1987

Chaves (Portugal)	1–2	(Hungary) Budapesti Honvéd
Zdravkov 87'	Report	Kovács 73'; Fodor 81'

Estádio Municipal de Chaves, Chaves
Attendance: 4,888
Referee: Karl-Josef Assenmacher (West Germany)

21 October 1987

Dundee United (Scotland)	1–2	(Czechoslovakia) TJ Vítkovice
Ferguson 24'	Report	Chmela 12'; Dostál 78'

Tannadice Park, Dundee
Attendance: 8,938
Referee: Ulf Eriksson (Sweden)

21 October 1987
19:30

Utrecht (Netherlands)	1–1	(Italy) Hellas Verona
Van Ginkel 45'	Report	Berthold 44'

Stadion Galgenwaard, Utrecht
Attendance: 16,341
Referee: Ioan Igna (Romania)

21 October 1987

Barcelona (Spain)	2–0	(Soviet Union) Dynamo Moscow
Amarilla 10'; Schuster 30'	Report

Estadi del Futbol Club Barcelona, Barcelona
Attendance: 25,833
Referee: Bep Thomas (Netherlands)

21 October 1987

Wismut Aue (East Germany)	1–0	(Albania) Flamurtari
Krauß 22'	Report

Otto-Grotewohl-Stadion, Aue
Attendance: 15,000
Referee: Jiří Stiegler (Czechoslovakia)

21 October 1987

Internazionale (Italy)	0–1	(Finland) TPS
	Report	Aaltonen 11'

San Siro, Milan
Attendance: 18,229
Referee: Wilfred Wallace (Republic of Ireland)

21 October 1987

Panathinaikos (Greece)	1–0	(Italy) Juventus
Saravakos 6'	Report

O.A.K.A., Athens
Attendance: 55,827
Referee: Ron Bridges (Wales)

21 October 1987

Red Star Belgrade (Socialist Federal Republic of Yugoslavia)	3–1	(Belgium) Club Brugge
Radovanović 53'; Cvetković 82'; Stojković 90' (pen.)	Report	Beyens 41'

Marakana, Belgrade
Attendance: 48,684
Referee: Jan Keizer (Netherlands)

21 October 1987

Toulouse (France)	1–1	(West Germany) Bayer Leverkusen
Tarantini 69' (pen.)	Report	Schreier 34'

Stadium Municipal, Toulouse
Attendance: 30,002
Referee: Zoran Petrović (Yugoslavia)

21 October 1987

Victoria București (Romania)	1–2	(Soviet Union) Dinamo Tbilisi
Vaișcovici 67' (pen.)	Report	Chedia 3'; Shengelia 20'

Stadionul Dinamo, Bucharest
Attendance: 3,000
Referee: Manfred Roßner (East Germany)

21 October 1987

Vitória de Guimarães (Portugal)	1–0	(Belgium) Beveren
Alcântara 66' (pen.)	Report

Estádio D. Afonso Henriques, Guimarães
Attendance: 9,250
Referee: Joaquín Ramos Marcos (Spain)

24 October 1987

Spartak Moscow (Soviet Union)	4–1	(West Germany) Werder Bremen
Mostovoi 11'; Rodionov 36', 55'; Pasulko 90'	Report	Burgsmüller 81'

Central Lenin Stadium, Moscow
Attendance: 65,000
Referee: Kurt Sørensen (Denmark)

=== Second leg ===
3 November 1987

Werder Bremen (West Germany)	6–2 (a.e.t.)	(Soviet Union) Spartak Moscow
Neubarth 4', 10'; Ordenewitz 25'; Sauer 78'; Riedle 101'; Burgsmüller 109'	Report	Cherenkov 71'; Pasulko 110'

Weserstadion, Bremen
Attendance: 14,600
Referee: Georges Sandoz (Switzerland)

Werder Bremen won 7–6 on aggregate.

4 November 1987

Español (Spain)	0–0	(Italy) Milan
	Report

Estadi de Sarrià, Barcelona
Attendance: 16,000
Referee: Alexis Ponnet (Belgium)

Español won 2–0 on aggregate.

4 November 1987

Feyenoord (Netherlands)	1–0	(Scotland) Aberdeen
Hoekstra 74'	Report

De Kuip, Rotterdam
Attendance: 26,390
Referee: Michel Vautrot (France)

2–2 on aggregate; Feyenoord won on away goals.

4 November 1987

Velež Mostar (Socialist Federal Republic of Yugoslavia)	2–1	(West Germany) Borussia Dortmund
Kodro 67'; Jurić 89'	Report	Mill 88'

Stadion pod Bijelim Brijegom, Mostar
Attendance: 18,000
Referee: Yuri Savchenko (Soviet Union)

Borussia Dortmund won 3–2 on aggregate.

4 November 1987

Sportul Studențesc (Romania)	3–0 (a.e.t.)	(Denmark) Brøndby
Munteanu 7'; Bozeșan 78'; Pană 89'	Report
Penalties
Iorgulescu (penalty scored); Țicleanu (penalty scored); Bozeșan (penalty scored)	3–0	(penalty missed) Schmeichel; (penalty missed) Olsen; (penalty missed) K. Nielsen

Stadionul Regie, Bucharest
Attendance: 9,600
Referee: Heinz Holzmann (Austria)

3–3 on aggregate; Sportul Studențesc won 3–0 on penalties.

4 November 1987

Budapesti Honvéd (Hungary)	3–1	(Portugal) Chaves
Sallai 22'; Fitos 79'; Kovács 88'	Report	Jorginho 77'

Bozsik József Stadion, Budapest
Attendance: 12,000
Referee: Henk van Ettekoven (Netherlands)

Budapesti Honvéd won 5–2 on aggregate.

4 November 1987

TJ Vítkovice (Czechoslovakia)	1–1	(Scotland) Dundee United
Vlk 77'	Report	Clark 37'

Bazaly, Ostrava
Attendance: 12,549
Referee: Marcel Van Langenhove (Belgium)

TJ Vítkovice won 3–2 on aggregate.

4 November 1987
19:30

Hellas Verona (Italy)	2–1	(Netherlands) Utrecht
Di Gennaro 69'; Verrips 89' (o.g.)	Report	de Kock 71'

Stadio Marcantonio Bentegodi, Verona
Attendance: 28,883
Referee: Manfred Neuner (West Germany)

Verona won 3–2 on aggregate.

4 November 1987

Dynamo Moscow (Soviet Union)	0–0	(Spain) Barcelona
	Report

Central Dynamo Stadium, Moscow
Attendance: 24,500
Referee: Carlo Longhi (Italy)

Barcelona won 2–0 on aggregate.

4 November 1987

Flamurtari (Albania)	2–0	(East Germany) Wismut Aue
Taho 3'; V. Ruci 72'	Report

Flamurtari Stadium, Vlorë
Attendance: 8,400
Referee: László Molnár (Hungary)

Flamurtari won 2–1 on aggregate.

4 November 1987

TPS (Finland)	0–2	(Italy) Internazionale
	Report	Scifo 50'; Altobelli 74'

Kupittaan jalkapallostadion, Turku
Attendance: 13,365
Referee: Janusz Eksztajn (Poland)

Internazionale won 2–1 on aggregate.

4 November 1987

Juventus (Italy)	3–2	(Greece) Panathinaikos
Cabrini 49', 72' (pen.); Alessio 59'	Report	Saravakos 46'; C. Dimopoulos 53'

Stadio Comunale Vittorio Pozzo, Turin
Attendance: 44,141
Referee: Joël Quiniou (France)

3–3 on aggregate; Panathinaikos won on away goals.

4 November 1987

Club Brugge (Belgium)	4–0	(Socialist Federal Republic of Yugoslavia) Red Star Belgrade
Brylle 13'; Ceulemans 47'; Radovanović 49' (o.g.); Beyens 88'	Report

Olympiastadion, Bruges
Attendance: 27,124
Referee: Dušan Krchňák (Czechoslovakia)

Club Brugge won 5–3 on aggregate.

4 November 1987

Bayer Leverkusen (West Germany)	1–0	(France) Toulouse
Schreier 80'	Report

Ulrich-Haberland-Stadion, Leverkusen
Attendance: 14,000
Referee: Kenny Hope (Scotland)

Bayer Leverkusen won 2–1 on aggregate.

4 November 1987

Dinamo Tbilisi (Soviet Union)	0–0	(Romania) Victoria București
	Report

Lenin Dinamo Stadium, Tbilisi
Attendance: 35,000
Referee: Simo Ruokonen (Finland)

Dinamo Tbilisi won 2–1 on aggregate.

4 November 1987

Beveren (Belgium)	1–0 (a.e.t.)	(Portugal) Vitória de Guimarães
Lemoine 66'	Report
Penalties
François (penalty scored); Kusto (penalty scored); Lemoine (penalty scored); Schmedding (penalty scored); Stalmans (penalty missed)	4–5	(penalty scored) Carvalho; (penalty scored) Adão; (penalty scored) Miguel; (penalty scored) Bené; (penalty scored) Alcântara

Freethiel, Beveren
Attendance: 6,000
Referee: Alain Delmer (France)

1–1 on aggregate; Vitória de Guimarães won 5–4 on penalties.

== Third round ==
Team 1	Agg.	Team 2	1st leg	2nd leg
Borussia Dortmund (West Germany)	3–5	(Belgium) Club Brugge	3–0	0–5 (a.e.t.)
Budapesti Honvéd (Hungary)	6–7	(Greece) Panathinaikos	5–2	1–5
Barcelona (Spain)	4–2	(Albania) Flamurtari	4–1	0–1
Feyenoord (Netherlands)	2–3	(West Germany) Bayer Leverkusen	2–2	0–1
Hellas Verona (Italy)	4–1	(Romania) Sportul Studențesc	3–1	1–0
Internazionale (Italy)	1–2	(Spain) Español	1–1	0–1
Vitória de Guimarães (Portugal)	2–2 (4–5 p)	(Czechoslovakia) TJ Vítkovice	2–0	0–2 (a.e.t.)
Werder Bremen (West Germany)	3–2	(Soviet Union) Dinamo Tbilisi	2–1	1–1

=== First leg ===
25 November 1987

Borussia Dortmund (West Germany)	3–0	(Belgium) Club Brugge
Mill 13', 63'; Anderbrügge 77'	Report

Westfalenstadion, Dortmund
Attendance: 52,000
Referee: Ioan Igna (Romania)

25 November 1987

Budapesti Honvéd (Hungary)	5–2	(Greece) Panathinaikos
Kovács 2', 32', 58', 61'; Fodor 24' (pen.)	Report	Saravakos 65', 88'

Bozsik József Stadion, Budapest
Attendance: 8,755
Referee: Henning Lund-Sørensen (Denmark)

25 November 1987

Barcelona (Spain)	4–1	(Albania) Flamurtari
Urbano 43'; Lineker 54', 58'; Carrasco 55'	Report	V. Ruci 70' (pen.)

Estadi del Futbol Club Barcelona, Barcelona
Attendance: 21,600
Referee: Gérard Biguet (France)

25 November 1987

Feyenoord (Netherlands)	2–2	(West Germany) Bayer Leverkusen
Been 36'; Hoekstra 45'	Report	Buncol 19'; Falkenmayer 32'

De Kuip, Rotterdam
Attendance: 27,000
Referee: José Rosa dos Santos (Portugal)

25 November 1987

Hellas Verona (Italy)	3–1	(Romania) Sportul Studențesc
Fontolan 25'; Pacione 29'; Elkjær 81' (pen.)	Report	Coraș 63'

Stadio Marcantonio Bentegodi, Verona
Attendance: 26,185
Referee: George Sandoz (Switzerland)

25 November 1987

Internazionale (Italy)	1–1	(Spain) Español
Serena 31'	Report	Lauridsen 82'

San Siro, Milan
Attendance: 46,567
Referee: Franz Wöhrer (Austria)

25 November 1987

Vitória de Guimarães (Portugal)	2–0	(Czechoslovakia) TJ Vítkovice
Kioma 62'; Caio 74'	Report

Estádio D. Afonso Henriques, Guimarães
Attendance: 20,000
Referee: George Courtney (England)

25 November 1987

Werder Bremen (West Germany)	2–1	(Soviet Union) Dinamo Tbilisi
Neubarth 3'; Riedle 18'	Report	Shengelia 20'

Weserstadion, Bremen
Attendance: 21,630
Referee: Ildefonso Urizar (Spain)

=== Second leg ===
9 December 1987

Club Brugge (Belgium)	5–0 (a.e.t.)	(West Germany) Borussia Dortmund
Ceulemans 10'; L. Van der Elst 48', 83' (pen.), 108' (pen.); F. Van der Elst 100'	Report

Olympiastadion, Bruges
Attendance: 27,134
Referee: Ron Bridges (Wales)

Club Brugge won 5–3 on aggregate.

9 December 1987

Panathinaikos (Greece)	5–1	(Hungary) Budapesti Honvéd
Vlachos 23', 37'; Antoniou 55'; Mavridis 65'; Batsinilas 82'	Report	Fitos 60'

O.A.K.A., Athens
Attendance: 73,982
Referee: Dušan Krchňák (Czechoslovakia)

Panathinaikos won 7–6 on aggregate.

9 December 1987

Flamurtari (Albania)	1–0	(Spain) Barcelona
Kushta 15'	Report

Flamurtari Stadium, Vlorë
Attendance: 8,480
Referee: Siegfried Kirschen (East Germany)

Barcelona won 4–2 on aggregate.

9 December 1987

Bayer Leverkusen (West Germany)	1–0	(Netherlands) Feyenoord
Götz 30'	Report

Ulrich-Haberland-Stadion, Leverkusen
Attendance: 18,500
Referee: Paolo Casarin (Italy)

Bayer Leverkusen won 3–2 on aggregate.

9 December 1987

Sportul Studențesc (Romania)	0–1	(Italy) Hellas Verona
	Report	Elkjær 69'

Stadionul Regie, Bucharest
Attendance: 10,500
Referee: Alexis Ponnet (Belgium)

Hellas Verona won 4–1 on aggregate.

9 December 1987

Español (Spain)	1–0	(Italy) Internazionale
Orejuela 23'	Report

Estadi de Sarrià, Barcelona
Attendance: 14,785
Referee: Dieter Pauly (West Germany)

Español won 2–1 on aggregate.

9 December 1987

TJ Vítkovice (Czechoslovakia)	2–0 (a.e.t.)	(Portugal) Vitória de Guimarães
Kovačík 33'; Grussmann 88'	Report
Penalties
Šourek (penalty scored); Bartl (penalty scored); Kadlec (penalty scored); Grussmann (penalty scored); Kovačík (penalty scored)	5–4	(penalty scored) Adão; (penalty scored) Weber; (penalty scored) Miguel; (penalty scored) N'Dinga; (penalty missed) Bené

Bazaly, Ostrava
Attendance: 7,600
Referee: Gerasimos Germanakos (Greece)

2–2 on aggregate; TJ Vítkovice won 5–4 on penalties.

9 December 1987

Dinamo Tbilisi (Soviet Union)	1–1	(West Germany) Werder Bremen
Sulakvelidze 31'	Report	Schaaf 61'

Lenin Dinamo Stadium, Tbilisi
Attendance: 75,000
Referee: Bo Karlsson (Sweden)

Werder Bremen won 3–2 on aggregate.

== Quarter-finals ==
Team 1	Agg.	Team 2	1st leg	2nd leg
Bayer Leverkusen (West Germany)	1–0	(Spain) Barcelona	0–0	1–0
Hellas Verona (Italy)	1–2	(West Germany) Werder Bremen	0–1	1–1
Panathinaikos (Greece)	2–3	(Belgium) Club Brugge	2–2	0–1
Español (Spain)	2–0	(Czechoslovakia) TJ Vítkovice	2–0	0–0

=== First leg ===
2 March 1988

Bayer Leverkusen (West Germany)	0–0	(Spain) Barcelona
	Report

Müngersdorfer Stadion, Cologne
Attendance: 35,000
Referee: Michel Vautrot (France)

2 March 1988
20:45

Hellas Verona (Italy)	0–1	(West Germany) Werder Bremen
	Report	Neubarth 49'

Stadio Marcantonio Bentegodi, Verona
Attendance: 33,435
Referee: Bob Valentine (Scotland)

2 March 1988

Panathinaikos (Greece)	2–2	(Belgium) Club Brugge
Saravakos 54'; Antoniou 60'	Report	Ceulemans 55'; Degryse 86'

O.A.K.A., Athens
Attendance: 70,932
Referee: Aron Schmidhuber (West Germany)

2 March 1988

Español (Spain)	2–0	(Czechoslovakia) TJ Vítkovice
Lauridsen 31'; Pineda 69'	Report

Estadi de Sarrià, Barcelona
Attendance: 14,247
Referee: Joël Quiniou (France)

=== Second leg ===
16 March 1988

Barcelona (Spain)	0–1	(West Germany) Bayer Leverkusen
	Report	Tita 59'

Camp Nou, Barcelona
Attendance: 28,616
Referee: George Courtney (England)

Bayer Leverkusen won 1–0 on aggregate.

16 March 1988

Werder Bremen (West Germany)	1–1	(Italy) Hellas Verona
Sauer 32'	Report	Volpecina 54'

Weserstadion, Bremen
Attendance: 39,000
Referee: Jan Keizer (Netherlands)

Werder Bremen won 2–1 on aggregate.

16 March 1988

Club Brugge (Belgium)	1–0	(Greece) Panathinaikos
Brylle 44'		https://www.uefa.com/uefaeuropaleague/match/4915--club-brugge-vs-panathinaikos/

Olympiastadion, Bruges
Attendance: 28,368
Referee: Adolf Prokop (East Germany)

Club Brugge won 3–2 on aggregate.

16 March 1988

TJ Vítkovice (Czechoslovakia)	0–0	(Spain) Español
	Report

Bazaly, Ostrava
Attendance: 24,658
Referee: Bep Thomas (Netherlands)

Español won 2–0 on aggregate.

== Semi-finals ==
Team 1	Agg.	Team 2	1st leg	2nd leg
Bayer Leverkusen (West Germany)	1–0	(West Germany) Werder Bremen	1–0	0–0
Club Brugge (Belgium)	2–3	(Spain) Español	2–0	0–3 (a.e.t.)

=== First leg ===
6 April 1988

Bayer Leverkusen (West Germany)	1–0	(West Germany) Werder Bremen
A. Reinhardt 60'	Report

Ulrich-Haberland-Stadion, Leverkusen
Attendance: 17,000
Referee: Gerasimos Germanakos (Greece)

6 April 1988

Club Brugge (Belgium)	2–0	(Spain) Español
Ceulemans 42'; Gallart 74' (o.g.)	Report

Olympiastadion, Bruges
Attendance: 28,387
Referee: Pietro D'Elia (Italy)

=== Second leg ===
20 April 1988

Werder Bremen (West Germany)	0–0	(West Germany) Bayer Leverkusen
	Report

Weserstadion, Bremen
Attendance: 29,536
Referee: Henning Lund-Sørensen (Denmark)

Bayer Leverkusen won 1–0 on aggregate.

20 April 1988

Español (Spain)	3–0 (a.e.t.)	(Belgium) Club Brugge
Orejuela 10'; Losada 63'; Alonso 119'	Report

Estadi de Sarrià, Barcelona
Attendance: 27,837
Referee: Helmut Kohl (Austria)

Español won 3–2 on aggregate.

== Final ==
=== First leg ===
4 May 1988

Español (Spain)	3–0	(West Germany) Bayer Leverkusen
Losada 45', 56'; Soler 49'	Report

Estadi de Sarrià, Barcelona
Attendance: 31,180
Referee: Dušan Krchňák (Czechoslovakia)

=== Second leg ===
18 May 1988

Bayer Leverkusen (West Germany)	3–0 (a.e.t.)	(Spain) Español
Tita 57'; Götz 63'; Cha Bum-kun 81'	Report
Penalties
Falkenmayer (penalty missed); Rolff (penalty scored); Waas (penalty scored); Täuber (penalty scored)	3–2	(penalty scored) Alonso; (penalty scored) Job; (penalty missed) Urquiaga; (penalty missed) Zúñiga; (penalty missed) Losada

Ulrich-Haberland-Stadion, Leverkusen
Attendance: 21,600
Referee: Jan Keizer (Netherlands)

3–3 on aggregate; Bayer Leverkusen won 3–2 on penalties.
