= Van Herpen =

Van Herpen is a surname. Notable people with the surname include:

- Iris van Herpen (born 1984), Dutch fashion designer
- Jan van Herpen (1920–2008), Dutch journalist, publicist, and editor
- Jos van Herpen (born 1962), Dutch footballer
- Daniel van Herpen (born 1988-2006) American lineman
