= Gunnar Sauer =

German retired footballer (born 1964)

Personal information
- Date of birth: 11 June 1964 (age 62)
- Place of birth: Cuxhaven, West Germany
- Height: 1.80 m (5 ft 11 in)
- Positions: Libero; centre back

Senior career*
Years	Team	Apps	(Gls)
1982–1985	Werder Bremen II	126	(12)
1984–1996	Werder Bremen	134	(8)
1996–1998	Hertha BSC	8	(0)
1998	VfB Leipzig	12	(0)
1998–1999	VfB Oldenburg	11	(0)
Total		303	(8)

International career
1987	West Germany U21	4	(0)
- * Club domestic league appearances and goals

Gunnar Sauer (born 11 June 1964) is a German retired professional footballer who played as a central defender, most notably with Werder Bremen.

Over the course of 13 seasons (12 with his main club), he amassed Bundesliga totals of 134 games and eight goals despite being plagued by injuries which kept him out of action for long periods.

Sauer represented West Germany at Euro 1988, but did not gain an international cap.

== Club career ==
=== Werder Bremen ===
Born in Cuxhaven, Lower Saxony, most of Sauer's career was spent at SV Werder Bremen. His best years came between 1986–91.

He contributed greatly to Werder Bremen's championship in the 1987–88 Bundesliga season, commanding the "club's probably best ever defence" which conceded just 22 goals.

On 13 September 1988, in a home match against Bayern Munich he injured his foot.

From 1991 injuries kept Sauer out of action for long periods and he was mainly used a backup, making only 17 Bundesliga appearances for Werder Bremen.

During the 1991 DFB-Pokal final against 1. FC Köln, which Werder Bremen won after penalties, Sauer again sustained an injury, hurting his Achilles tendon. This injury required four operations for him to play football again and he made his comeback in April 1994.

=== Later years ===
In 1996, Sauer left Werder Bremen having spent 15 years at the club joining Hertha BSC. He helped the club promote from the second division, although he played very little. After one campaign each with VfB Leipzig (second level) and VfB Oldenburg (regional leagues) he retired in 1999 at the age of 35.

== International career ==
Sauer was summoned by the West Germany national team to the UEFA Euro 1988 tournament, but did not leave the bench for the hosts, never being recalled afterwards.

Also in 1988, he was called up for the 1988 Summer Olympics. Due to an injury he did not make an appearance but received a bronze medal.

== Style of play ==
Considered "perhaps the best libero" in his time, Sauer was known for his "elegant ball control" and great range of passing.

== Career statistics ==
=== Club ===
Appearances and goals by club, season and competition
Club	Season	League			Cup		Continental		Other		Total		Ref.
Club	Season	Division	Apps	Goals	Apps	Goals	Apps	Goals	Apps	Goals	Apps	Goals	Ref.
Werder Bremen II	1983–84				1	0	–		–		1	0	
Werder Bremen	1984–85	Bundesliga	1	0	0	0	–		–		1	0	
Werder Bremen	1985–86	Bundesliga	1	0	1	0	–		–		2	0	
Werder Bremen	1987–88	Bundesliga	25	1	2	0	2	0	–		29	1	
Werder Bremen	1987–88	Bundesliga	33	2	4	0	9	3	–		46	5	
Werder Bremen	1988–89	Bundesliga	19	2	2	0	2	0	1 (Note: One appearance in DFL-Supercup)	0	24	2	
Werder Bremen	1989–90	Bundesliga	18	2	3	0	5	2	0	0	26	4	
Werder Bremen	1990–91	Bundesliga	22	0	5	0	0	0	0	0	27	0	
Werder Bremen	1993–94	Bundesliga	1	0	0	0	0	0	0	0	1	0	
Werder Bremen	1994–95	Bundesliga	11	0	0	0	1	0	0	0	12	0	
Werder Bremen	1995–96	Bundesliga	3	1	0	0	0	0	0	0	3	1	
Werder Bremen	Total		134	8	17	0	19	5	1	0	171	13	–
Hertha BSC	1996–97	2. Bundesliga	8	0	0	0	0	0	0	0	8	0	
VfB Leipzig	1997–98	2. Bundesliga	12	0	0	0	0	0	0	0	12	0	
VfB Oldenburg	1998–99												
Career total			154	8	17	0	19	5	1	0	191	13	–

== Honours ==
Werder Bremen

- Bundesliga: 1987–88, 1992–93
- DFB-Pokal: 1990–91, 1993–94; runner-up 1988–89, 1989–90
- DFL-Supercup: 1988

Germany

- 1988 Summer Olympics: third place
