= Miguel Marques (footballer) =

Portuguese footballer

Miguel
Personal information
- Full name: Miguel Alberto Fernandes Marques
- Date of birth: 7 June 1963 (age 63)
- Place of birth: Guimarães, Portugal
- Height: 1.78 m (5 ft 10 in)
- Position: Centre-back

Youth career
- 1978–1981: Vitória Guimarães

Senior career*
Years	Team	Apps	(Gls)
1981–1988	Vitória Guimarães	122	(3)
1981–1982	→ Moreirense (loan)		
1982–1984	→ Vizela (loan)	58	(1)
1988–1991	Sporting CP	41	(0)
1991–1997	Gil Vicente	164	(9)
1997–2005	Trofense	200	(21)
2005–2006	Torcatense	18	(0)
Total		603	(34)

International career
1987–1989	Portugal	5	(0)
- * Club domestic league appearances and goals

Miguel Alberto Fernandes Marques (born 7 June 1963), known simply as Miguel, is a Portuguese former professional footballer who played as a central defender.

== Club career ==
Miguel was born in Guimarães. From 1984 to 1997, he spent 13 seasons in the Primeira Liga, with Vitória de Guimarães, Sporting CP and Gil Vicente FC, totalling 327 matches and 12 goals and being relegated in the last year while at the service of the latter club.

Miguel retired in June 2006 at the age of 43, after not being able to help G.D. União Torcatense avoid relegation from the third division.

== International career ==
Miguel earned five caps for Portugal in the late 80s, all coming after the infamous Saltillo Affair at the 1986 FIFA World Cup, which caused most of the squad to defect from international play. He made his debut on 23 September 1987, in a 1–0 away win against Sweden for the UEFA Euro 1988 qualifiers.
