= Jan van Herpen =

Dutch journalist, publicist and editor

Jan Johannes van Herpen (Deventer, 31 March 1920 - Hilversum, 29 January 2008) was a Dutch journalist, publicist and editor.

Jan van Herpen was born in Deventer, and was employed by the Dutch broadcasting organization AVRO from February 1, 1940. He acquired national fame as the main man of the oldest running Dutch radio quiz Hersengymnastiek ("Brain Gymnastics") that ran from 1948 thru 1982. In 1967 he won the ANV-Visser Neerlandia-price for his radio drama De griffioen eet cantharellen. When he retired in 1980 he started publishing works on the Dutch writer P. H. Ritter. In all he published over 20 books on Ritter and Ritter's literary work. Van Herpen also published on the history of Dutch radio. From 1987 he was one of the editors in chief of the Dutch publishing house Flanor. He died in Hilversum, aged 87.

== Prizes and decorations ==
- Visser Neerlandia -Prijs (1966).
- Knight in the Crown Order of Belgium (1975).
- Knight in the Order of Oranje-Nassau (2000).

== Sources ==
- http://www.dbnl.org/auteurs/auteur.php?id=herp003
- http://www.beeldengeluidwiki.nl/index.php/Jan_van_Herpen
