= Gijs Steinmann =

Dutch footballer

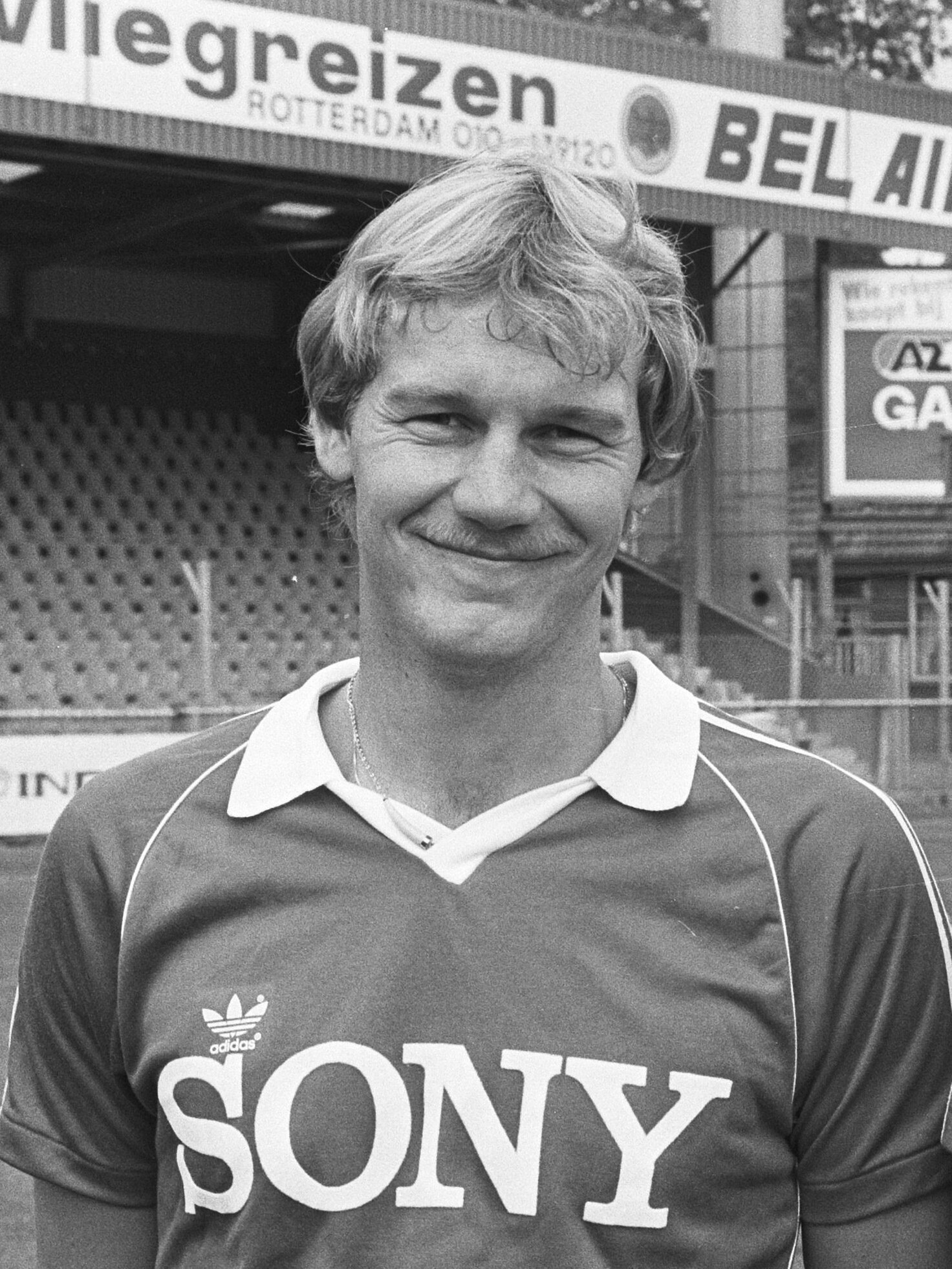

Personal information
- Full name: Gijsbertus Steinmann
- Date of birth: 2 April 1961 (age 65)
- Place of birth: Utrecht, Netherlands
- Height: 1.83 m (6 ft 0 in)
- Position: Defender

Senior career*
Years	Team	Apps	(Gls)
1979–1985	AZ	87	(8)
1985–1987	Den Bosch	65	(10)
1987–1990	Utrecht	96	(2)
1991	Dundee United	14	(1)
1991–1992	Heracles '74	16	(2)
1992–1996	Go Ahead Eagles	88	(6)
Total		366	(29)
- * Club domestic league appearances and goals

Gijsbertus "Gijs" Steinmann (born 2 April 1961) is a Dutch former professional footballer who played as a defender.

== Career ==
Steinmann played club football for AZ, Den Bosch, Utrecht and Go Ahead Eagles in the Eredivisie. During his career he was known for his outspoken nature, and had conflicts with managers.

Steinmann ended his career after the 1995–96 season at Go Ahead Eagles, after he had been demoted from the first team by head coach Ab Fafié. He had earlier called former head coach Henk ten Cate a "liar", and had been deemed a source of friction in the squad.

After his retirement, Steinmann started working for a company specialising in coffee and snack machines, and he lives in Houten.
