= Horst Brummeier =

Austrian football referee

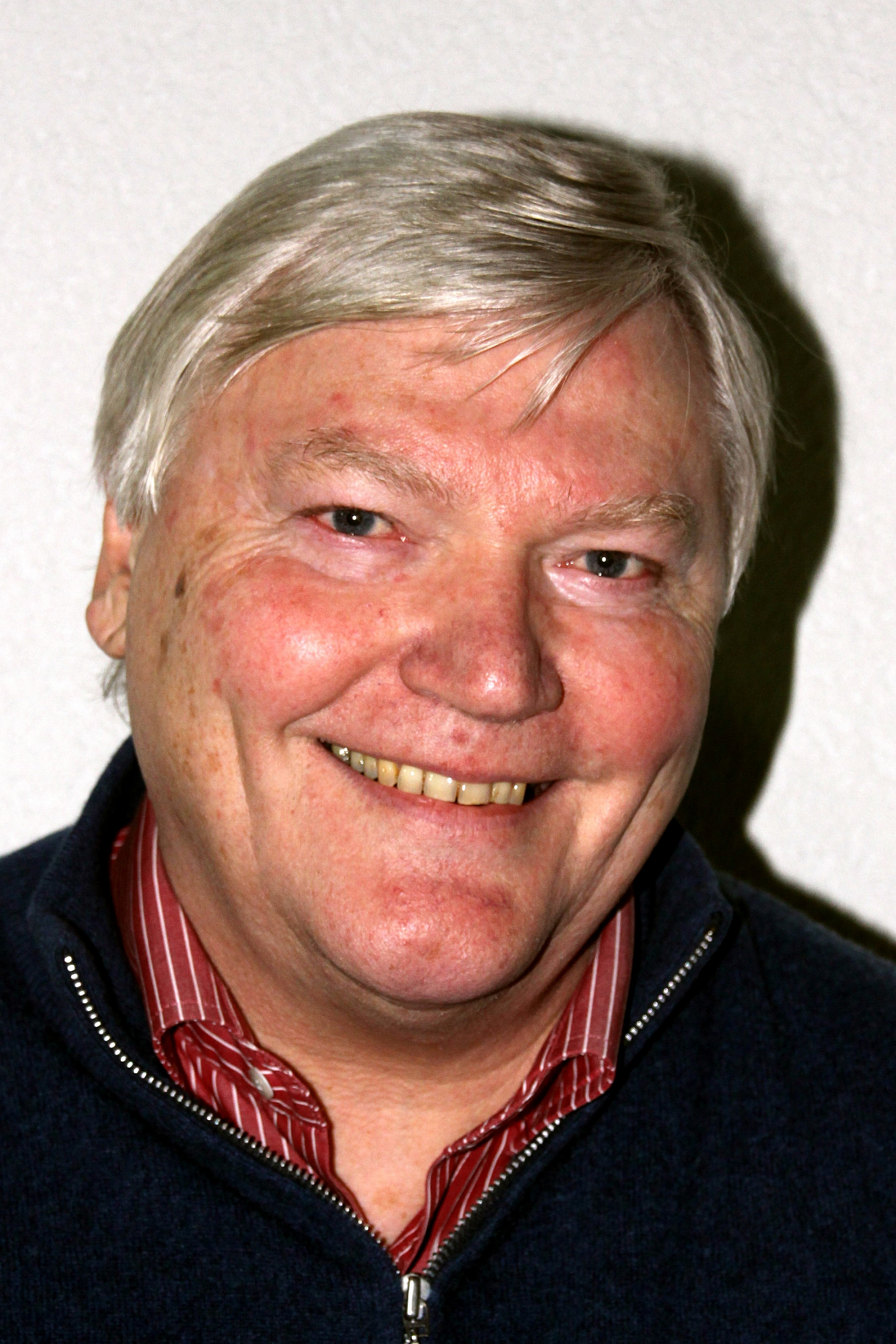
- Horst Brummeier (2009)
- Born: 31 December 1945 (age 80); Traun, Austria

Domestic
Years	League	Role
1976–1992	Bundesliga	Referee

International
Years	League	Role
1978–1990	FIFA-listed	Referee

Horst Brummeier (born 31 December 1945) is a retired Austrian football referee. He is known for having refereed one match in the 1986 FIFA World Cup. He also refereed one match in the 1988 UEFA European Football Championship in West Germany. He also refereed in the Champions League in from 1979 to 1989. He refereed in the OFB-Cup from 1975 to 1986.
