= Bep Thomas =

Dutch football referee (born 1938)

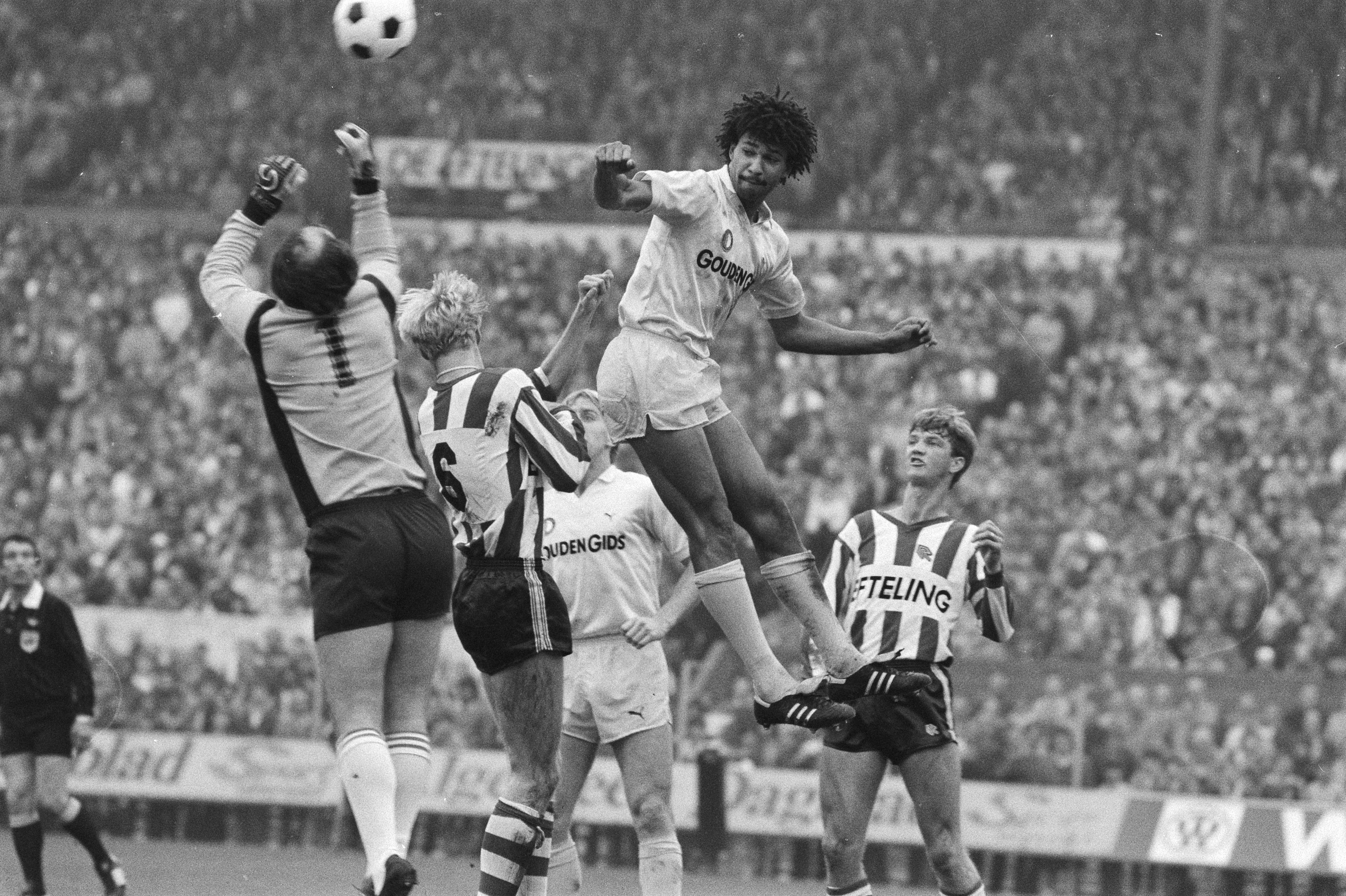
- Full name: Albert Rudolf Thomas
- Born: 7 October 1938 (age 88); Amsterdam, Netherlands

Domestic
Years	League	Role
1979–1989	Eredivisie	Referee

International
Years	League	Role
1981–1989	FIFA listed	Referee

Albert Rudolf "Bep" Thomas (born 7 October 1938) is a retired Dutch football referee.

== Refereeing career ==
Thomas began his refereeing career in Amsterdam before being assigned to officiate in the Eerste Divisie. In 1979, he was promoted to the Eredivisie, where he officiated 248 matches. In 1981, Thomas was appointed as a FIFA referee.

In 1988, Thomas was chosen as a referee for UEFA Euro 1988, where he officiated a group stage match between Spain and Denmark.

Thomas stopped officiating internationally and in the Eredivisie in 1989, before retiring from officiating in 1991.
