= József Fitos =

Hungarian footballer (1959–2022)

Personal information
- Date of birth: 4 November 1959
- Place of birth: Nova, Budapest, Hungary
- Date of death: 23 December 2022 (aged 63)
- Position: Midfielder

Youth career
- 1971–1978: Lenti

Senior career*
Years	Team	Apps	(Gls)
1978–1980	Zalaegerszegi TE		
1980–1985	Haladás		
1985–1988	Budapest Honvéd		
1989	Panathinaikos		
1990	Panionios		
1990	Újpest		
1991–1992	Hargita FC		

International career
1985–1989	Hungary		

Managerial career
- 2002: Budapest Honvéd
- 2002–2008: Ózdi FC
- 2008–2014: Sze-Fi LSE
- 2014–2017: ASR Gázgyár
- 2017–: Leányfalu SE
- * Club domestic league appearances and goals

József Fitos (4 November 1959 – 23 December 2022) was a Hungarian professional footballer who played as a midfielder. He was a member of the Hungary national team. Fitos worked as an active football coach.

== Club career ==
Fitos started playing football in 1971 for Lenti. In 1978 he transferred to Zalaegerszegi TE. From 1980 to 1985 he played for Szombathelyi Haladás. He then moved to Budepest Honvéd, the success team of the 1980s, where he won three champion titles with the team. In 1989 he signed to Panathinaikos and then for Panionios In 1990 he returned home and played for Újpest. He then played for Hargita FC, where he finished his active sports career.

== International career ==
Between 1985 and 1989 Fitos played 12 times for the Hungary national team.

== Coaching career ==
From 2002 Fitos was a coach at the Hungarian football teams Budapest Honvéd, FC Ózdi, LSE Széfi-Fi and ASR Gázgyár, and since 2017 he has been the football coach of Leányfalu SE.

== Personal life and death ==
On 17 February 2017, the Budapest District Court sentenced him to one year and six months imprisonment on two counts of fraud. The execution of the sentence was suspended for three years.

Fitos died on 23 December 2022, at the age of 63.

== Honours ==
Budapest Honvéd

- Nemzeti Bajnokság I: 1985–86, 1987–88, 1988–89
- Magyar Kupa finalist: 1988
