= Siegfried Kirschen =

German football referee (1943–2024)

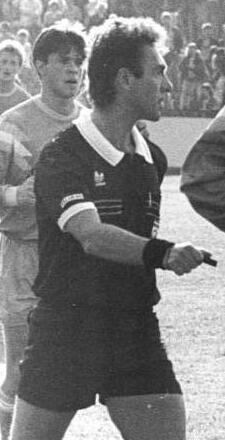
- Kirschen in 1990
- Born: 13 October 1943; Chemnitz, Gau Saxony, Germany
- Died: 19 April 2024 (aged 80); Bad Saarow, Brandenburg, Germany

Domestic
Years	League	Role
1972–1991	DDR-Oberliga	Referee
1990–1991	Bundesliga	Referee

International
Years	League	Role
1974–1990	FIFA-listed	Referee

Siegfried Kirschen (13 October 1943 – 19 April 2024) was an East German football referee. He supervised four matches in the FIFA World Cup, two in 1986 and two in 1990.

== As a referee ==
Kirschen was initially active himself as a junior footballer at SC Motor Karl-Marx-Stadt, passed his referee exams in 1961, refereed 251 DDR-Oberliga games from 1972 to 1991 and on 17 May 1980, the FDGB Cup final between Carl Zeiss Jena and Rot-Weiß Erfurt, which ended 3–1 a.e.t. in Berlin's Stadion der Weltjugend in front of 45,000 spectators.

The psychology graduate and army member was long considered one of the best in his profession. He was with the NVA of the DDR from 1962 to 1987, last rank lieutenant colonel. A FIFA referee since 1979, Siegfried Kirschen took part in the 1986 FIFA World Cup finals in Mexico as an impartial referee for the DDR Football Association, officiating the preliminary round match between Northern Ireland and Brazil, 0–3 (0–2), and the quarterfinal between Spain and Belgium, 1–1 a.e.t. (1–1, 0–1), 4–5 p.s.o., as well as at the 1990 FIFA World Cup in Italy with the management of the preliminary round match Belgium against Uruguay, 3–1 (2–0), and the round of 16 ČSFR against Costa Rica, 4–1 (1–0).

As a linesman, he made three appearances at the 1986 finals (Bulgaria vs. Italy 1–1, Scotland vs. Denmark 0–1, and England vs. Morocco 0–0), and two appearances in 1990 for Uruguay vs. Spain (0–0) and Brazil vs. Scotland (1–0).

At the 1988 European Football Championship in the Federal Republic of Germany, he was entrusted with the management of the island derby England vs. Ireland, 0–1 (0–1).

43 European Cup matches, including the first leg of the 1987 UEFA Cup final between IFK Gothenburg and Dundee United on 6 May 1987 at the Nya Ullevi, (Gothenburg), which ended 1–0 (1–0) in front of 50,023 spectators, and the 1989 UEFA Super Cup final KV Mechelen vs. PSV Eindhoven were under his direction. In addition, he directed 24 international matches.

In the Bundesliga, he was in charge of two matches in the 1990–91 season, namely the north derby between FC St. Pauli and Hamburger SV and the south derby between VfB Stuttgart and Bayern Munich.

On 30 October 2006, it became known that he was allegedly an unofficial collaborator of the Ministry for State Security of the DDR. Under the code name "Friedrich", he had spied on various people over a period of 20 years. The allegations, however, were always denied by him.

== As an official ==
Kirschen, who worked professionally as a teacher and psychologist, was chairman of the referee commission in the former district technical committee Frankfurt (Oder). Since its founding in 1990, he had been president of the Brandenburg State Football Association, a member of the board of the Northeastern German Football Association (NOFV) and - since summer 2008 - chairman of the NOFV Referees Committee. He worked as a DFB referee coach in the Bundesliga as well as an international referee observer. In March 2018, he announced that he would not run for re-election as association president. Jens Kaden was elected as his successor as association president in September 2018.

== Death ==
Kirschen died on 19 April 2024, at the age of 80.
