= Ioan Igna =

Romanian footballer and referee

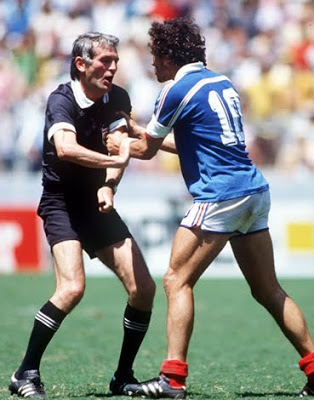
- Ioan Igna (left) with Michel Platini (right) at 1986 FIFA World Cup.
- Born: 4 June 1940 (age 86); Arad, Romania
- Other occupation: Footballer

Domestic
Years	League	Role
1974–1989	Liga I	Referee

International
Years	League	Role
1976–1989	FIFA-listed	Referee

Ioan Igna (born 4 June 1940) is a Romanian former football referee and player. Igna played football at UTA Arad between 1957 and 1960 and 1964–1967 and at Știința Timișoara between 1961 and 1964, he became a referee in 1972. He is known for having refereed two matches in the 1986 FIFA World Cup in Mexico, including an epic quarter-final match between Brazil and France. Igna made two controversial calls during the tie. In the second period of extra time, he did not penalise a foul by the Brazil goalkeeper Carlos on France attacker Bruno Bellone. BBC commentator Jimmy Hill described Igna's decision to ignore the foul by Carlos as "an extreme mistake". In the penalty shootout, he awarded a goal when Bellone's shot hit the post and the ball rebounded off Carlos before entering the goal. The laws of the game were subsequently amended to specifically address the situation that occurred in the penalty shootout.

He also refereed the second leg of the 1987 UEFA Cup Final and a semi-final in the 1988 UEFA European Football Championship in West Germany between the Netherlands and West Germany.
