= Luc Beyens =

Belgian footballer

Personal information
- Date of birth: 27 March 1959 (age 67)
- Position: Midfielder

International career
Years	Team	Apps	(Gls)
1987	Belgium	2	(0)

Luc Beyens (born 27 March 1959) is a Belgian footballer. He played in two matches for the Belgium national football team in 1987.
