= Jerzy Hawrylewicz =

Polish footballer (1958–2009)

Personal information
- Date of birth: 22 December 1958
- Place of birth: Choszczno, Poland
- Date of death: 12 February 2009 (aged 50)
- Place of death: Oldenburg, Germany
- Height: 1.71 m (5 ft 7 in)
- Position: Forward

Senior career*
Years	Team	Apps	(Gls)
1977	Grunwald Choszczno		
1977–1978	Arkonia Szczecin		
1978–1984	Stal Stocznia Szczecin		
1984–1987	Pogoń Szczecin	87	(12)
1987–1992	VfB Oldenburg		
- * Club domestic league appearances and goals

Jerzy Hawrylewicz (22 December 1958 – 13 February 2009) was a Polish professional footballer who played as a forward. He represented Grunwald Choszczno (1977), Arkonia Szczecin (1977–1978), Stal Stocznia Szczecin (1978–1984), Pogoń Szczecin (1984–1987), and VfB Oldenburg (1987–1992).

On 20 April 1992, during the match against Hannoverscher SC, the then 33-year-old collapsed on the pitch with a heart attack. He suffered from persistent vegetative state syndrome and remained comatose until his death on 13 February 2009.

== Career ==
Hawrylewicz joined VfB Oldenburg of the Oberliga Nord from Pogoń Szczecin. He contributed to the club's promotion to the 2. Bundesliga in 1990, being the club's most prolific scorer with 15 goals in 32 matches. He made eleven appearances in the 2. Bundesliga.
