= UEFA Euro 1988 =

8th European association football championship

1988 UEFA European Football Championship
Fußball-Europameisterschaft Bundesrepublik Deutschland 1988

Tournament details
- Host country: West Germany
- Dates: 10–25 June
- Teams: 8
- Venues: 8 (in 8 host cities)

Final positions
- Champions: Netherlands (1st title)
- Runners-up: Soviet Union
- Third place: West Germany; Italy

Tournament statistics
- Matches played: 15
- Goals scored: 34 (2.27 per match)
- Attendance: 849,844 (56,656 per match)
- Top scorer: (Netherlands) Marco van Basten (5 goals)
- Best player: (Netherlands) Marco van Basten

The 1988 UEFA European Football Championship final tournament was held in West Germany from 10 to 25 June 1988. It was the eighth UEFA European Championship, which is held every four years and supported by UEFA. France were the defending champions, but failed to qualify. The Netherlands won the tournament, which was their first European championship title.

Euro 1988 was a rare instance of a major football tournament ending without a single sending-off or goalless draw, nor any knockout matches going to extra time or penalties. This was the final European Championship to feature teams from West Germany and the Soviet Union, as the West and East Germans reunified to become Germany in 1990, and the Soviet Union disintegrated into 15 countries in 1991.

== Bid process ==
West Germany won the right to host the tournament with five votes ahead of a joint bid from Norway, Sweden and Denmark, which earned one vote, and a bid from England. Because the Eastern Bloc disagreed that West Berlin was part of the Federal Republic of Germany, the German Football Association ruled out playing Championship matches in West Berlin. This secured the participation of Eastern European members of UEFA. In the 1974 FIFA World Cup, however, West Berlin had hosted three games. As a compromise, the Berlin Olympic Stadium hosted a Four Nations Tournament in 1988, with West Germany playing against the Soviet Union, Argentina and Sweden.

== Overview ==
=== Group matches ===
The first group pitted two pre-tournament favourites West Germany and Italy together, along with Spain and Denmark. The West German team had won the 1980 European Championship and were the runners-up in each of the last two World Cups in 1982 and 1986, although in 1984 they failed to qualify from their group. With such results and additionally as the host they were largely considered the main favourite to win.

The Italians had not played at Euro 1984, though they had finished fourth in the 1980 tournament, which they had hosted. Italy had also won the FIFA 1982 World Cup, albeit followed by a middling performance in 1986. Spain and Denmark contested the second semi-final of the 1984 edition, in which Spain prevailed on penalty-kicks, but then lost the final to hosts, France (who failed to qualify in 1988). Both Spain and Denmark played in the 1986 World Cup, and met there again, in a Round of 16 match of the knockout stage in which Spain won 5–1.

West Germany and Italy played the opening game. This game was tightly contested. Roberto Mancini capitalised on a defensive error on the left-hand side of the German goal and the striker squeezed in a shot from a tight angle low to the left corner. Just three minutes later, Italy's goalkeeper, Walter Zenga was penalised for taking more than four steps with the ball and Andreas Brehme scored the resulting free-kick from the edge of the penalty area with a low shot to the right corner. Both teams settled for a 1–1 draw.

Spain defeated Denmark again, this time 3–2. Míchel opened the scoring after five minutes with a shot to the left corner from inside the penalty area and Michael Laudrup equalised 20 minutes later with a left foot shot from the edge of the penalty area to the left corner. Spain dominated the next hour and Emilio Butragueño scored with a low shot through the goalkeepers legs and then Rafael Gordillo putting the Spanish 3–1 to the good with a free-kick which deceived the goalkeeper. A late surge saw Flemming Povlsen reduce the scoreline with a header in off the left post, but was not enough for the Danes, who now needed to win both their remaining games to be certain of a place in the semi-finals.

In the remaining games, West Germany defeated Denmark and Spain. Jürgen Klinsmann and Olaf Thon scored to dispatch the former 2–0 while two goals from Rudi Völler were enough to beat Spain 2–0.

The Italians won a difficult match against Spain 1–0, courtesy of a low-cross shot from Gianluca Vialli. In the last game, against an already eliminated Denmark, the Italians won 2–0.

The second group witnessed a surprising set of results. In the opening game, one of the pre-tournament favourites England lost 1–0 to Ireland. Ray Houghton scored a looping header after six minutes after the English defence failed to clear a cross. The English applied strong pressure as the game wore on. Gary Lineker was unusually sluggish, missing a series of chances and hitting the crossbar – he was later diagnosed with hepatitis B. In the other opening game, the Soviet Union defeated the Netherlands 1–0 through a Vasyl Rats goal, despite the Dutch dominating for long periods.

England met the Netherlands in Düsseldorf; both needed to win. England started strongly with Lineker hitting a post and Glenn Hoddle striking the post with a free-kick. The English defence, weakened by the absence of Terry Butcher, conceded the first of three goals to Marco van Basten on 44 minutes. Van Basten turned Butcher's replacement Tony Adams and beat Peter Shilton – playing his 100th game for England – to give his side a 1–0 lead. England rallied after the break. Lineker and Bryan Robson exchanged a kick one-two pass allowing Robson to burst into the box and lift the ball over Hans van Breukelen after 53 minutes. The score remained until Van Basten turned Tony Adams inside out to finish from 18 yards on 71 minutes. The striker pounced from close-range after a corner to seal a 3–1 win four minutes later.

The Irish and Soviets led the group after two games through a 1–1 draw in Hanover. Ronnie Whelan scored a spectacular left-foot volley from 18 yards to put the Irish into the lead. Oleh Protasov equalised with a low shot as the Soviets exerted late pressure.

Needing to defeat the Irish to progress, the Dutch won the game 1–0 through a late Wim Kieft goal. The ball deflected into his path and he delivered a looping header which spun into the right corner of the Irish net with nine minutes remaining just after Paul McGrath hit a Dutch post with a header. In the other game, the Soviets soundly thrashed England. A mistake from Hoddle allowed Sergei Aleinikov to score after three minutes. Adams equalised and England had chances to go ahead, but a goal before half-time and late in the game assured the Soviet Union would finish in first place in the group.

=== Semi-finals and final ===
The first semi-final was significant as rivals West Germany played the Netherlands. It was only the third time the two sides had faced each other since the 1974 FIFA World Cup Final; the West Germans winning a first round match in the 1980 European Championship, and a 2–2 draw in a 1978 FIFA World Cup second round group match. The game was tight, and the West Germans broke the deadlock on 55 minutes with a Matthäus penalty after a foul on Klinsmann. The lead was held for 20 minutes until Jürgen Kohler brought down Van Basten. Ronald Koeman converted the spot-kick to level the match. With the match headed for extra time, a through ball caught the Germans out and Van Basten finished clinically with a shot as he slid along the floor, beating the goalkeeper and Kohler to the ball in the 88th minute for a 2–1 win. It gave the Dutch their first competitive victory against the Germans and the first appearance in the competition's final. The victory was marred by the reaction of Dutch defender Koeman who wiped the shirt of Olaf Thon, given to him after the match, on his backside in front of the German fans. The player apologised afterwards.

The other semi-final was another unpredictable result. Italy were strong favourites to reach the final and had beaten the Soviets 4–1 in a friendly just two months earlier. Despite controlling the play and having the majority of the chances, the Italians were undone by poor finishing and a strong, tough opposition who sought to stop their more skilful opponents from playing through hard tackles and a defensive strategy. The hard work-rate of the Soviets paid off and in just four second-half minutes, counter-attacks saw two goals from Hennadiy Lytovchenko and Oleg Protasov. The first one from Lytovchenko was initially blocked, but with quick reactions he beat Franco Baresi to the ball to fire the second shot into the far corner. The second from Protasov was a looping shot that floated over Zenga for a 2–0 victory. It would be the Soviet Union's fourth appearance in a European Championship final.

The final was played on 25 June between the Soviet Union, in what would turn out to be their last European Championship match, and the Netherlands at the Olympiastadion in Munich. The Dutch won the match 2–0, with goals by captain Ruud Gullit and tournament top scorer Marco van Basten. Van Basten's goal, a sharply hit volley across the goal off an incoming looping pass, would later be described as one of the greatest goals in the history of the European Championships.

== Qualification ==
=== Qualified teams ===
Seven countries had to qualify for the final stage. West Germany qualified automatically as hosts of the event. The Republic of Ireland qualified for the first time for any major tournament. The holders, France, failed to qualify despite finishing third in the 1986 World Cup. As of 2024, this is the last time that France failed to qualify for the European Championship finals, and since the conversion to a group stage in the finals tournament, this remains the only time the previous tournament winners failed to qualify for the next competition. Other notable absentees were Belgium (the 1980 runners-up and 1986 FIFA World Cup semi-finalists) and Portugal (semi-finalists of Euro 1984). The following eight teams qualified for the final tournament:

Team	Qualified as	Qualified on	Previous appearances in tournament (Note: Bold indicates champion for that year. Italic indicates host for that year.)
West Germany	Host	14 March 1985	4 (**1972**, 1976, **1980**, 1984)
Denmark	Group 6 winner	14 October 1987	2 (1964, 1984)
Soviet Union	Group 3 winner	28 October 1987	4 (**1960**, 1964, 1968, 1972)
England	Group 4 winner	11 November 1987	2 (1968, 1980)
Republic of Ireland	Group 7 winner	11 November 1987	0 (debut)
Italy	Group 2 winner	14 November 1987	2 (**1968**, 1980)
Spain	Group 1 winner	18 November 1987	3 (**1964**, 1980, 1984)
Netherlands	Group 5 winner	9 December 1987	2 (1976, 1980)

Group 1 West Germany Italy Denmark Spain	Group 2 England Republic of Ireland Netherlands Soviet Union

== Venues ==
UEFA Euro 1988 is located in FRG and West Berlin		Munich	Gelsenkirchen
UEFA Euro 1988 is located in FRG and West Berlin		Olympiastadion	Parkstadion
UEFA Euro 1988 is located in FRG and West Berlin		Capacity: 72,770	Capacity: 70,748
UEFA Euro 1988 is located in FRG and West Berlin		Hamburg	Frankfurt
UEFA Euro 1988 is located in FRG and West Berlin		Volksparkstadion	Waldstadion
UEFA Euro 1988 is located in FRG and West Berlin		Capacity: 61,330	Capacity: 61,056
Düsseldorf	Hanover	Stuttgart	Cologne
Rheinstadion	Niedersachsenstadion	Neckarstadion	Müngersdorfer Stadion
Capacity: 68,400	Capacity: 60,366	Capacity: 70,705	Capacity: 60,584

== Squads ==
Each national team had to submit a squad of 20 players.

== Match officials ==
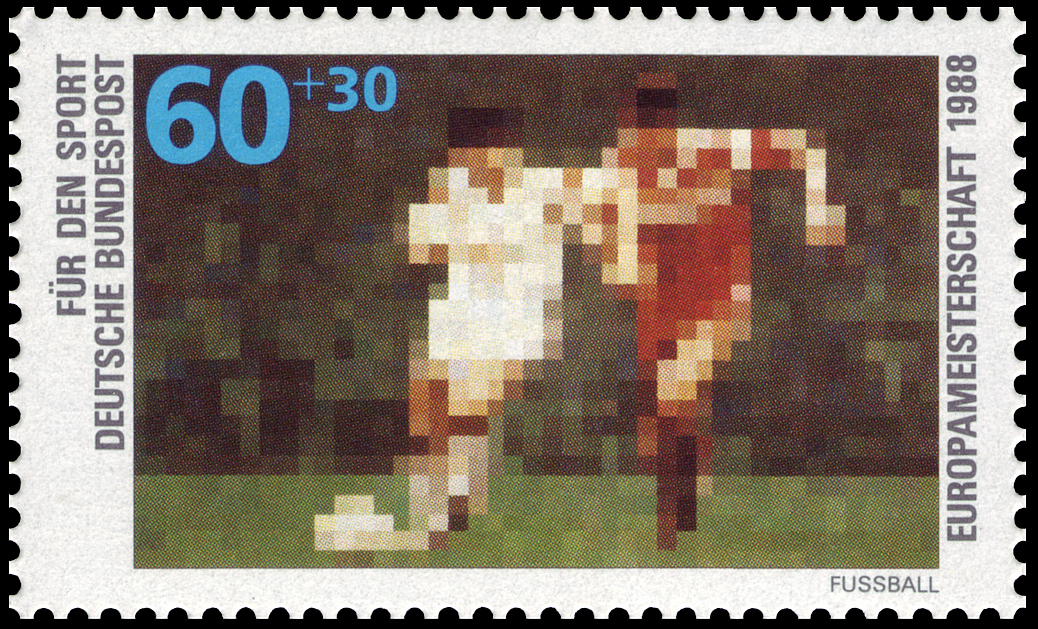
Special stamp issued by Deutsche Bundespost for the tournament

Country	Referee	Linesmen		Matches refereed
Austria	Horst Brummeier	Heinz Holzmann	Helmut Kohl	Republic of Ireland–Netherlands (group 2)
Belgium	Alexis Ponnet	Frans Van Den Wijngaert	Jean-François Crucke	Soviet Union–Italy (semi-finals)
East Germany	Siegfried Kirschen	Klaus Peschel	Manfred Roßner	England–Republic of Ireland (group 2)
England	Keith Hackett	Neil Midgley	Brian Hill	West Germany–Italy (group 1)
France	Michel Vautrot	Gérard Biguet	Rémi Harrel	West Germany–Spain (group 1); Soviet Union–Netherlands (final)
Italy	Paolo Casarin	Carlo Longhi	Pierluigi Magni	England–Netherlands (group 2)
Netherlands	Bep Thomas	John Blankenstein	Jacob van der Niet	Denmark–Spain (group 1)
Portugal	José Rosa dos Santos	José Francisco Conceição Silva	Fortunato Alves de Azevedo	England–Soviet Union (group 2)
Romania	Ioan Igna	Ștefan Dan Petrescu	Ion Crăciunescu	West Germany–Netherlands (semi-finals)
Scotland	Bob Valentine	Kenny Hope	Andrew Waddell	West Germany–Denmark (group 1)
Spain	Emilio Soriano Aladrén	José Donato Pes Pérez	José Mauro Socorro González	Republic of Ireland–Soviet Union (group 2)
Sweden	Erik Fredriksson	Bo Karlsson	Christer Drottz	Italy–Spain (group 1)
Switzerland	Bruno Galler	Renzo Peduzzi	Philippe Mercier	Italy–Denmark (group 1)
West Germany	Dieter Pauly	Karl-Heinz Tritschler	Aron Schmidhuber	Netherlands–Soviet Union (group 2)

Fourth officials

Country	Fourth officials
Poland	Michał Listkiewicz
West Germany	Karl-Josef Assenmacher
West Germany	Werner Föckler
West Germany	Wolf-Günter Wiesel

== Group stage ==
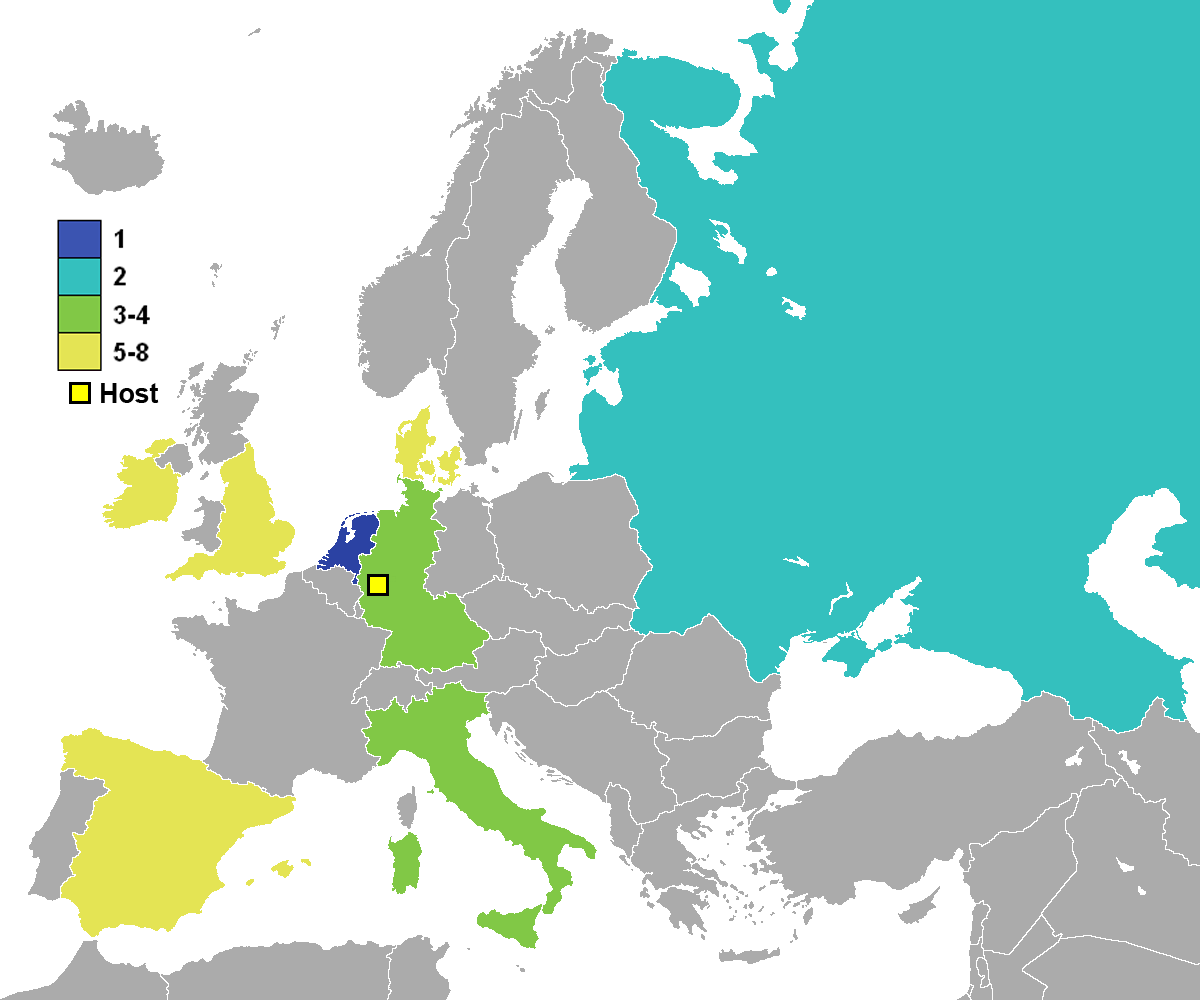
Results for UEFA Euro 1988 finalists

The teams finishing in the top two of each group progressed to the semi-finals.

All times are local, CEST (UTC+2).

=== Tiebreakers ===
If two or more teams finished level on points after completion of the group matches, the following tie-breakers were used to determine the final ranking:

1. Goal difference in all group matches
2. Greater number of goals scored in all group matches
3. Drawing of lots

=== Group 1 ===
Pos	Team	Pld	W	D	L	GF	GA	GD	Pts	Qualification
1	West Germany (H)	3	2	1	0	5	1	+4	5	Advance to knockout stage
2	Italy	3	2	1	0	4	1	+3	5	Advance to knockout stage
3	Spain	3	1	0	2	3	5	−2	2	
4	Denmark	3	0	0	3	2	7	−5	0	

Source: UEFA
(H) Hosts
10 June 1988
20:15

West Germany	1–1	Italy
Brehme 55'	Report	Mancini 52'

Rheinstadion, Düsseldorf
Attendance: 62,552
Referee: Keith Hackett (England)
11 June 1988
15:30

Denmark	2–3	Spain
Laudrup 24'; Povlsen 82'	Report	Míchel 5'; Butragueño 53'; Gordillo 66'

Niedersachsenstadion, Hanover
Attendance: 55,707
Referee: Bep Thomas (Netherlands)

14 June 1988
17:15

West Germany	2–0	Denmark
Klinsmann 10'; Thon 85'	Report

Parkstadion, Gelsenkirchen
Attendance: 64,812
Referee: Bob Valentine (Scotland)
14 June 1988
20:15

Italy	1–0	Spain
Vialli 73'	Report

Waldstadion, Frankfurt
Attendance: 47,506
Referee: Erik Fredriksson (Sweden)

17 June 1988
20:15

West Germany	2–0	Spain
Völler 29', 51'	Report

Olympiastadion, Munich
Attendance: 63,802
Referee: Michel Vautrot (France)
17 June 1988
20:15

Italy	2–0	Denmark
Altobelli 67'; De Agostini 87'	Report

Müngersdorfer Stadion, Cologne
Attendance: 53,951
Referee: Bruno Galler (Switzerland)

=== Group 2 ===
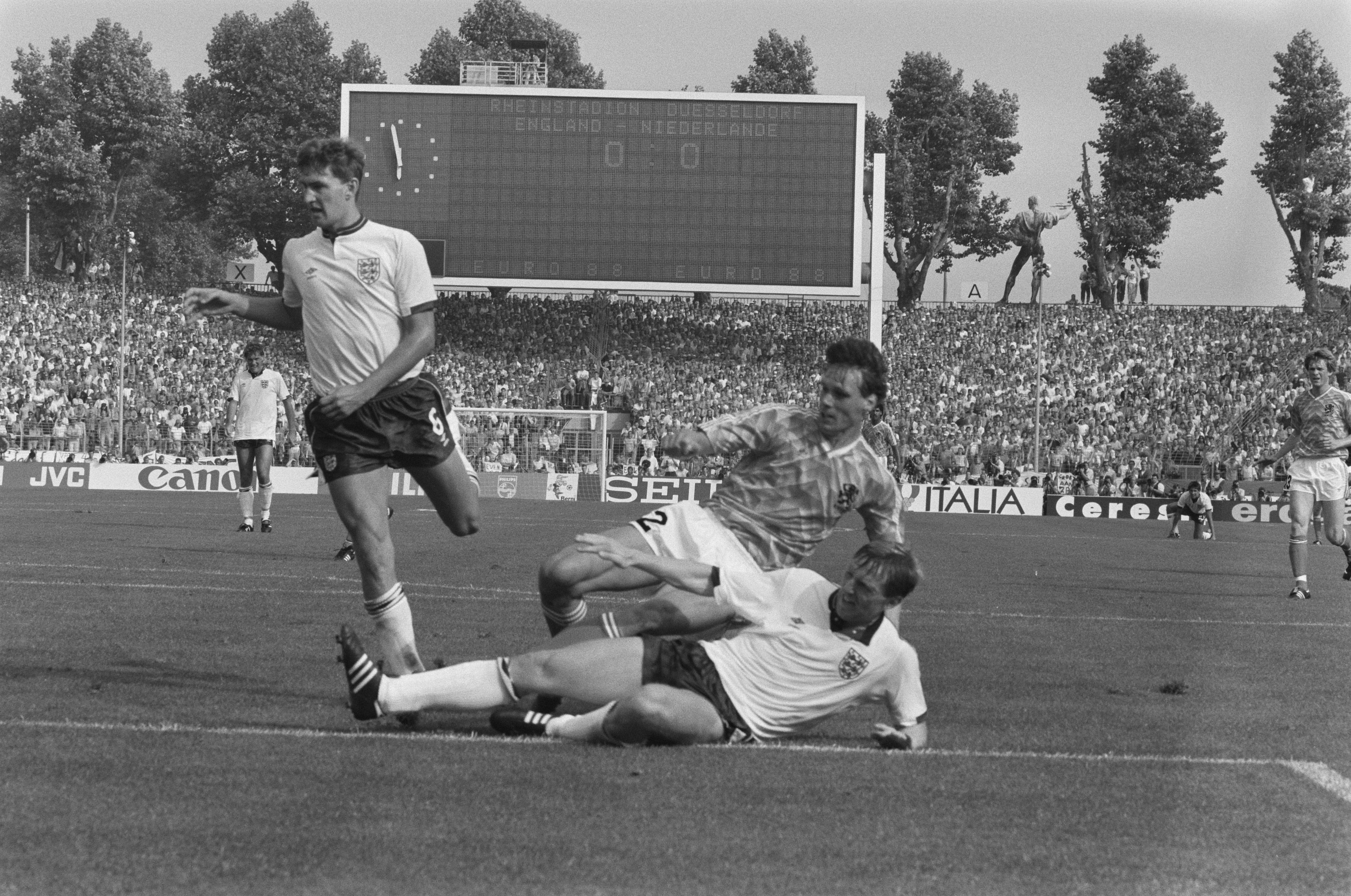
England v Netherlands match

Pos	Team	Pld	W	D	L	GF	GA	GD	Pts	Qualification
1	Soviet Union	3	2	1	0	5	2	+3	5	Advance to knockout stage
2	Netherlands	3	2	0	1	4	2	+2	4	Advance to knockout stage
3	Republic of Ireland	3	1	1	1	2	2	0	3	
4	England	3	0	0	3	2	7	−5	0	

Source: UEFA
12 June 1988
15:30

England	0–1	Republic of Ireland
	Report	Houghton 6'

Neckarstadion, Stuttgart
Attendance: 51,373
Referee: Siegfried Kirschen (East Germany)
12 June 1988
20:15

Netherlands	0–1	Soviet Union
	Report	Rats 52'

Müngersdorfer Stadion, Cologne
Attendance: 54,336
Referee: Dieter Pauly (West Germany)

15 June 1988
17:15

England	1–3	Netherlands
Robson 53'	Report	Van Basten 44', 71', 75'

Rheinstadion, Düsseldorf
Attendance: 63,940
Referee: Paolo Casarin (Italy)
15 June 1988
20:15

Republic of Ireland	1–1	Soviet Union
Whelan 38'	Report	Protasov 74'

Niedersachsenstadion, Hanover
Attendance: 38,308
Referee: Emilio Soriano Aladrén (Spain)

18 June 1988
15:30

England	1–3	Soviet Union
Adams 16'	Report	Aleinikov 3'; Mykhaylychenko 28'; Pasulko 73'

Waldstadion, Frankfurt
Attendance: 48,335
Referee: José Rosa dos Santos (Portugal)
18 June 1988
15:30

Republic of Ireland	0–1	Netherlands
	Report	Kieft 82'

Parkstadion, Gelsenkirchen
Attendance: 64,731
Referee: Horst Brummeier (Austria)

== Knockout stage ==
In the knockout phase, extra time would be played if scores were level after 90 minutes, and a penalty shoot-out if teams could not be separated after the additional period.

=== Bracket ===
Semi-finals
22 June – Stuttgart
Soviet Union	2
Italy	0
21 June – Hamburg
West Germany	1
Netherlands	2

Final
25 June – Munich
Soviet Union	0
Netherlands	2

=== Semi-finals ===
21 June 1988
20:15

West Germany	1–2	Netherlands
Matthäus 55' (pen.)	Report	R. Koeman 74' (pen.); Van Basten 88'

Volksparkstadion, Hamburg
Attendance: 56,115
Referee: Ioan Igna (Romania)

22 June 1988
20:15

Soviet Union	2–0	Italy
Lytovchenko 58'; Protasov 62'	Report

Neckarstadion, Stuttgart
Attendance: 61,606
Referee: Alexis Ponnet (Belgium)

=== Final ===
25 June 1988
15:30

Soviet Union	0–2	Netherlands
	Report	Gullit 32'; Van Basten 53'

Olympiastadion, Munich
Attendance: 62,770
Referee: Michel Vautrot (France)

== Statistics ==
=== Goalscorers ===
There were 34 goals scored in 15 matches, for an average of 2.27 goals per match.

5 goals

- (Netherlands) Marco van Basten

2 goals

- (Soviet Union) Oleh Protasov
- (West Germany) Rudi Völler

1 goal

- (Denmark) Michael Laudrup
- (Denmark) Flemming Povlsen
- (England) Tony Adams
- (England) Bryan Robson
- (Italy) Alessandro Altobelli
- (Italy) Luigi De Agostini
- (Italy) Roberto Mancini
- (Italy) Gianluca Vialli
- (Netherlands) Ruud Gullit
- (Netherlands) Wim Kieft
- (Netherlands) Ronald Koeman
- (Republic of Ireland) Ray Houghton
- (Republic of Ireland) Ronnie Whelan
- (Soviet Union) Sergei Aleinikov
- (Soviet Union) Hennadiy Lytovchenko
- (Soviet Union) Oleksiy Mykhaylychenko
- (Soviet Union) Viktor Pasulko
- (Soviet Union) Vasyl Rats
- (Spain) Emilio Butragueño
- (Spain) Rafael Gordillo
- (Spain) Míchel
- (West Germany) Andreas Brehme
- (West Germany) Jürgen Klinsmann
- (West Germany) Lothar Matthäus
- (West Germany) Olaf Thon

=== Awards ===
UEFA Team of the Tournament

Goalkeeper	Defenders	Midfielders	Forwards
(Netherlands) Hans van Breukelen	(Italy) Giuseppe Bergomi (Italy) Paolo Maldini (Netherlands) Ronald Koeman (Netherlands) Frank Rijkaard	(Italy) Giuseppe Giannini (Netherlands) Jan Wouters (West Germany) Lothar Matthäus	(Italy) Gianluca Vialli (Netherlands) Ruud Gullit (Netherlands) Marco van Basten
