= Jos van Herpen =

Dutch footballer

Personal information
- Date of birth: 28 April 1962 (age 64)
- Place of birth: Vught, Netherlands
- Height: 1.88 m (6 ft 2 in)
- Position: Defender

Youth career
- Zwaluw VFC

Senior career*
Years	Team	Apps	(Gls)
1982–1986	Den Bosch	105	(5)
1986–1988	Feyenoord	52	(2)
1988–1989	RKC	18	(0)
1989–1991	Brest Armorique	59	(1)
1991	RKC	8	(0)
1992	Tienen		
1992–1994	RKC	30	(1)
Total		272	(9)

International career
1985	Netherlands U21	1	(0)
- * Club domestic league appearances and goals

Jos van Herpen (born 28 April 1962) is a Dutch retired football defender.

== Club career ==
Born in Vught, Van Herpen started playing football for local outfit Zwaluw VFC and made his senior debut for Den Bosch in the Eerste Divisie and later played for Feyenoord and RKC. He also had a spell at French side Brest Armorique, whom he joined in 1989.

== International career ==
Van Herpen was capped once by the Netherlands national under-21 football team

== Post-playing career ==
After retiring as a player, van Herpen opened his own sportshop in Vught. He also runs a football school with his son Yannick and is head of youth football at Zwaluw VFC.
