= 1991–92 FC Dinamo Tbilisi season =

Dinamo Tbilisi
1991-92 season
- Head Coach: David Kipiani (until December 31, 1991); Revaz Dzodzuashvili
- Stadium: Dinamo stadium, Tbilisi
- Umaglesi Liga: 1st (3rd title)
- Georgian Cup: Winner (1st title)
- Top goalscorer: Kakhi Kacharava (26)

Dinamo Tbilisi's third season in the Umaglesi Liga.

Dinamo Tbilisi won the league and the Georgian Cup.

== Squad report ==
Dinamo Tbilisi played by the name FC Iberia Tbilisi.

== Current squad ==
| No. | Name | Nationality | Birth date and age | Signed from | Notes |
Goalkeepers
| 1 | Nikoloz Chkheidze | (Georgia (country)) | 29 November 1968 (aged 23) | Torpedo Kutaisi | |
| | Temur Chlaidze | (Georgia (country)) | | | |
| | Davit Gvaramadze | (Georgia (country)) | 8 November 1975 (aged 16) | Youth Sector | |
Defenders
| 2 | Malkhaz Arziani | (Georgia (country)) | 15 August 1964 (aged 27) | Guria Lanchkhuti | |
| 3 | Givi Kveladze | (Georgia (country)) | 13 June 1970 (aged 22) | Magaroeli Chiatura | |
| 4 | Murtaz Shelia | (Georgia (country)) | 25 March 1969 (aged 23) | Amirani Ochamchire | |
| 5 | Dimitri Kudinov | (Georgia (country)) | 8 February 1963 (aged 29) | Gorda | |
| 8 | Gocha Chikovani | (Georgia (country)) | 12 October 1962 (aged 29) | Dinamo Batumi | |
| | Davit Tsomaia | (Georgia (country)) | 4 November 1967 (aged 24) | Guria Lanchkhuti | |
| | Khvicha Khartishvili | (Georgia (country)) | 12 January 1973 (aged 19) | | |
| | Alexander Rekhviashvili | (Georgia (country)) | 8 June 1974 (aged 18) | Youth Sector | |
| | Mamuka Butsureishvili | (Georgia (country)) | 10 June 1974 (aged 18) | TSU Tbilisi | |
Midfielders
| 6 | Zaza Revishvili | (Georgia (country)) | 26 May 1968 (aged 24) | Youth Sector | |
| 7 | Gela Inalishvili | (Georgia (country)) | 10 March 1966 (aged 26) | Tskhumi Sokhumi | |
| | Gocha Jamarauli | (Georgia (country)) | 23 June 1971 (aged 20) | Youth Sector | |
| | Revaz Arveladze | (Georgia (country)) | 19 September 1969 (aged 22) | Martve Tbilisi | |
| | Gia Jishkariani | (Georgia (country)) | 30 November 1967 (aged 24) | Guria Lanchkhuti | |
| | Gocha Tkebuchava | (Georgia (country)) | 24 November 1963 (aged 28) | Guria Lanchkhuti | |
| | Giorgi Ramazashvili | (Georgia (country)) | | Youth Sector | |
| | Tamaz Pertia | (Georgia (country)) | 23 December 1974 (aged 17) | Youth Sector | |
Forwards
| 9 | Kakhi Kacharava | (Georgia (country)) | 19 November 1966 (aged 25) | Torpedo Kutaisi | |
| 10 | Mikheil Kavelashvili | (Georgia (country)) | 22 June 1971 (aged 20) | Youth Sector | |
| 11 | Shota Arveladze | (Georgia (country)) | 22 February 1973 (aged 19) | Martve Tbilisi | |
| | Archil Arveladze | (Georgia (country)) | 22 February 1973 (aged 19) | Martve Tbilisi | |
| | Vazha Zhvania | (Georgia (country)) | 5 November 1960 (aged 31) | Shevardeni-1906 Tbilisi | |
| | Paata Gamtsemlidze | (Georgia (country)) | 6 January 1974 (aged 18) | TSU Tbilisi | |

=== Appearances, goals and disciplinary record ===
| Pos. | Player | L App | L | L (yellow card) | L (red card) |
|---|---|---|---|---|---|
| GK | (Georgia (country)) Nikoloz Chkheidze | 37 | -37 | 1 | 0 |
| GK | (Georgia (country)) Temur Chlaidze | 2 | -2 | 0 | 0 |
| GK | (Georgia (country)) Davit Gvaramadze | 3 | -2 | 0 | 0 |
| DF | (Georgia (country)) Malkhaz Arziani | 29 | 1 | 0 | 0 |
| DF | (Georgia (country)) Murtaz Shelia | 33 | 2 | 0 | 0 |
| MF | (Georgia (country)) Zaza Revishvili | 33 | 14 | 0 | 1 |
| FW | (Georgia (country)) Kakhi Kacharava | 28 | 26 | 2 | 0 |
| FW | (Georgia (country)) Mikheil Kavelashvili | 37 | 21 | 0 | 0 |
| DF | (Georgia (country)) Gocha Chikovani | 34 | 1 | 0 | 0 |
| DF | (Georgia (country)) Dimitri Kudinov | 32 | 1 | 1 | 0 |
| DF | (Georgia (country)) Givi Kveladze | 22 | 0 | 1 | 0 |
| MF | (Georgia (country)) Gia Jishkariani | 7 | 0 | 0 | 0 |
| MF | (Georgia (country)) Gocha Jamarauli | 20 | 2 | 0 | 0 |
| DF | (Georgia (country)) Davit Tsomaia | 7 | 0 | 1 | 0 |
| FW | (Georgia (country)) Shota Arveladze | 30 | 22 | 1 | 0 |
| MF | (Georgia (country)) Revaz Arveladze | 27 | 6 | 3 | 0 |
| MF | (Georgia (country)) Gela Inalishvili | 34 | 11 | 1 | 0 |
| DF | (Georgia (country)) Khvicha Khartishvili | 6 | 0 | 0 | 0 |
| DF | (Georgia (country)) Alexander Rekhviashvili | 12 | 0 | 0 | 0 |
| DF | (Georgia (country)) Mamuka Butsureishvili | 1 | 0 | 0 | 0 |
| MF | (Georgia (country)) Gocha Tkebuchava | 19 | 0 | 1 | 0 |
| MF | (Georgia (country)) Giorgi Ramazashvili | 1 | 0 | 0 | 0 |
| MF | (Georgia (country)) Tamaz Pertia | 3 | 0 | 0 | 0 |
| FW | (Georgia (country)) Archil Arveladze | 19 | 3 | 0 | 0 |
| FW | (Georgia (country)) Vazha Zhvania | 10 | 2 | 0 | 0 |
| FW | (Georgia (country)) Paata Gamtsemlidze | 2 | 0 | 0 | 0 |
| | Disciplinary Committee for | - | 3 | - | - |

== Competitions ==
=== Umaglesi Liga ===
==== League table ====
| Pos | Team | Pld | W | D | L | GF | GA | GD | Pts |
|---|---|---|---|---|---|---|---|---|---|
| 1 | Iberia-Dinamo Tbilisi (C) | 38 | 27 | 6 | 5 | 115 | 41 | +74 | 87 |
| 2 | Tskhumi Sokhumi | 38 | 24 | 4 | 10 | 96 | 53 | +43 | 76 |
| 3 | Gorda Rustavi | 38 | 22 | 9 | 7 | 71 | 38 | +33 | 75 |
| 4 | Guria Lanchkhuti | 38 | 22 | 3 | 13 | 89 | 56 | +33 | 69 |
| 5 | Kolkheti-1913 Poti | 38 | 15 | 11 | 12 | 49 | 45 | +4 | 56 |

Source: rsssf.org
Rules for classification: 1st points; 2nd matches won; 3rd head-to-head
(C) Champions

==== Matches ====
| 15 August 1991 1 | Iberia-Dinamo Tbilisi | 1 – 0 | Mretebi | Tbilisi |
| | Kacharava | | | Stadium: Dinamo Arena |

| 20 August 1991 2 | Iberia-Dinamo Tbilisi | 4 – 2 | Guria | Tbilisi |
| | Sh. Arveladze; Kavelashvili; Inalishvili; Revishvili | | (yellow card) Korghalidze; Pridonashvili | Stadium: Dinamo Arena |

| 26 August 1991 3 | Kutaisi | 0 – 3 | Iberia-Dinamo Tbilisi | Kutaisi |
| | | | | Stadium: Givi Kiladze Stadium |
Note: The match is abandoned. Dinamo won with technical score 3:0.

| 30 August 1991 4 | Iberia-Dinamo Tbilisi | 0 – 1 | Kolkheti-1913 | Tbilisi |
| | | | (yellow card) Sichinava | Stadium: Dinamo Arena |

| 7 September 1991 5 | Batumi | 1 – 3 | Iberia-Dinamo Tbilisi | Batumi |
| | Kveladze ((o.g)) | | (yellow card) Kacharava; Arziani; (yellow card) Kveladze | Stadium: Dinamo Stadium |

| 12 September 1991 6 | Iberia-Dinamo Tbilisi | 5 – 1 | Tskhumi | Tbilisi |
| | Revishvili; Inalishvili; Kacharava; R. Arveladze (yellow card); Tkebuchava (yellow card) | | Jishkariani | Stadium: Dinamo Arena |

| 17 September 1991 7 | Odishi | 1 – 0 | Iberia-Dinamo Tbilisi | Zugdidi |
| | Kizilashvili | | | Stadium: Gulia Tutberidze Stadium |

| 20 October 1991 8 | Iberia-Dinamo Tbilisi | 4 – 1 | Dila Gori | Tbilisi |
| | Kavelashvili; Kacharava; Sh. Arveladze; Jamarauli | | Mikeladze | Stadium: Dinamo Arena |

| 24 October 1991 9 | Mertskhali | 1 – 4 | Iberia-Dinamo Tbilisi | Batumi |
| | Salukvadze | | Inalishvili; Shelia | Stadium: Dinamo Stadium |

| 27 October 1991 10 | Iberia-Dinamo Tbilisi | 6 – 1 | Margveti | Tbilisi |
| | Kacharava; Inalishvili; Kavelashvili | | Kerdzevadze | Stadium: Dinamo Arena |

| 30 October 1991 11 | Iberia-Dinamo Tbilisi | 7 – 3 | Mziuri | Tbilisi |
| | Kacharava; Sh. Arveladze; Revishvili | | N. Kakubava; Kharchilava; D. Chkhetia | Stadium: Dinamo Arena |

| 3 November 1991 12 | Iberia-Dinamo Tbilisi | 4 – 2 | Kolkheti Khobi | Tbilisi |
| | Revishvili; Kacharava; Sh. Arveladze | | Bakuradze | Stadium: Dinamo Arena |

| 7 November 1991 13 | Gorda | 1 – 2 | Iberia-Dinamo Tbilisi | Rustavi |
| | Torghashvili | | Kacharava | Stadium: Poladi Stadium |

| 11 November 1991 14 | Iberia-Dinamo Tbilisi | 3 – 2 | Shevardeni-1906 | Tbilisi |
| | Kavelashvili; Revishvili; Kacharava (yellow card); Inalishvili (yellow card) | | Chaduneli; Anchabadze; (yellow card) Kobelashvili | Stadium: Dinamo Arena |

| 15 November 1991 15 | Sulori | 0 – 5 | Iberia-Dinamo Tbilisi | Vani |
| | | | Revishvili; A. Arveladze | Stadium: Grigol Nikoleishvili Stadium |

| 19 November 1991 16 | Iberia-Dinamo Tbilisi | 4 – 1 | Alazani | Tbilisi |
| | Kacharava; Sh. Arveladze | | Zaalishvili | Stadium: Dinamo Arena |

| 22 November 1991 17 | Iberia-Dinamo Tbilisi | 3 – 0 | Samtredia | Tbilisi |
| | Kavelashvili; Revishvili | | | Stadium: Dinamo Arena |

| 26 November 1991 18 | Amirani | 1 – 3 | Iberia-Dinamo Tbilisi | Ochamchire |
| | Tryvaliov | | Kacharava; Revishvili | Stadium: Central Stadium |

| 29 November 1991 19 | Samgurali | 2 – 1 | Iberia-Dinamo Tbilisi | Tskaltubo |
| | Chkonia; Ionanidze | | Kavelashvili; (yellow card) Chkheidze | Stadium: 26 May Stadium |

| 16 March 1992 20 | Iberia-Dinamo Tbilisi | 4 – 1 | Kutaisi | Tbilisi |
| | Sh. Arveladze; Inalishvili; Kavelashvili | | Janashia | Stadium: Dinamo Arena |

| 29 March 1992 21 | Iberia-Dinamo Tbilisi | 0 – 0 | Batumi | Tbilisi |
| | | | | Stadium: Dinamo Arena |

| 12 April 1992 22 | Iberia-Dinama Tbilisi | 7 – 2 | Odishi | Tbilisi |
| | Sh. Arveladze; Kavelashvili; Shelia; Chikovani; Kacharava | | Denisyuk; Kizilashvili | Stadium: Dinamo Arena |

| 16 April 1992 23 | Margveti | 0 – 0 | Iberia-Dinamo Tbilisi | Zestaponi |
| | | | (red card) Revishvili; (yellow card) Sh. Arveladze | Stadium: David Abashidze Stadium |

| 21 April 1992 24 | Iberia-Dinamo Tbilisi | 3 – 1 | Gorda | Tbilisi |
| | Kavelashvili; Sh. Arveladze | | Pantsulaia | Stadium: Dinamo Arena |

| 25 April 1992 25 | Alazani | 0 – 1 | Iberia-Dinamo Tbilisi | Gurjaani |
| | | | Kavelashvili | Stadium: Central Stadium |

| 3 May 1992 26 | Iberia-Dinamo Tbilisi | 3 – 0 | Samgurali | Tbilisi |
| | Kavelashvili; Sh. Arveladze | | (yellow card) Mikadze | Stadium: Dinamo Arena |

| 8 May 1992 27 | Dila Gori | 2 – 2 | Iberia-Dinamo Tbilisi | Gori |
| | Zv. Khorguashvili; Melkadze | | Kavelashvili | Stadium: Tengiz Burjanadze Stadium |

| 14 May 1992 28 | Guria | 2 – 1 | Iberia-Dinamo Tbilisi | Lanchkhuti |
| | Tevzadze; Nemsadze | | Jamarauli | Stadium: Evgrapi Shevardnadze Stadium |

| 17 May 1992 29 | Iberia-Dinamo Tbilisi | 2 – 0 | Mertskhali | Tbilisi |
| | Inalishvili; R. Arveladze | | | Stadium: Dinamo Arena |

| 20 May 1992 30 | Mziuri | 2 – 2 | Iberia-Dinamo Tbilisi | Gali |
| | Metreveli; D. Chkhetia | | Kavelashvili; R. Arveladze | Stadium: Central Stadium |

| 23 May 1992 31 | Mretebi | 0 – 1 | Iberia-Dinamo Tbilisi | Tbilisi |
| | Papidze (yellow card) | | Sh. Arveladze | Stadium: Dinamo Arena |

| 30 May 1992 32 | Kolkheti Khobi | 0 – 1 | Iberia-Dinamo Tbilisi | Khobi |
| | | | Kavelashvili | Stadium: Central Stadium |

| 1 June 1992 33 | Kolkheti-1913 | 2 – 2 | Iberia-Dinamo Tbilisi | Poti |
| | Kobalia; Sichinava | | Sh. Arveladze; R. Arveladze | Stadium: Fazisi Stadium |

| 4 June 1992 34 | Shevardeni-1906 | 4 – 3 | Iberia-Dinamo Tbilisi | Tbilisi |
| | Anchabadze; Kobelashvili | | Zhvania; R. Arveladze; Revishvili | Stadium: Shevardeni Stadium |

| 8 June 1992 35 | Iberia-Dinamo Tbilisi | 10 – 1 | Sulori | Tbilisi |
| | Kavelashvili; Sh. Arveladze; Inalishvili; Kacharava; Kudinov; Revishvili | | A. Dvalishvili | Stadium: Dinamo Arena |

| 12 June 1992 36 | Tskhumi | 0 – 2 | Iberia-Dinamo Tbilisi | Sokhumi |
| | | | Sh. Arveladze; Kacharava; (yellow card) R. Arveladze; (yellow card) Kudinov | Stadium: Republic Stadium |

| 16 June 1992 37 | Samtredia | 1 – 1 | Iberia-Dinamo Tbilisi | Samtredia |
| | Sobol | | Kacharava | Stadium: Erosi Manjgaladze Stadium |

| 20 June 1992 38 | Iberia-Dinamo Tbilisi | 8 – 2 | Amirani | Tbilisi |
| | Kacharava; Sh. Arveladze; Kavelashvili; R. Arveladze; Zhvania; A. Arveladze | | (yellow card) Chaligava; Jojua | Stadium: Dinamo Arena |

=== Georgian Cup ===
| Round | Opponents | Aggregate | Home | Away |
|---|---|---|---|---|
| Round of 32 | Mretebi | 6–1 | 2–1 | 4–0 |
| Round of 16 | Sapovnela | 6–0 | 0–0 | 6–0 |
| Quarterfinals | Batumi | 3–1 | 0–0 | 3–1 |
| Semifinals | Kutaisi | 3–1 | 2–0 | 1–1 |
| Final | Tskhumi | 3–1 | | |
