= 1991 FC Dinamo Tbilisi season =

Dinamo Tbilisi
1991 season
- Head Coach: David Kipiani
- Stadium: Dinamo stadium, Tbilisi
- Umaglesi Liga: 1st (2nd title)
- Georgian Cup: No competition
- Top goalscorer: Mikheil Kavelashvili (12)

Dinamo Tbilisi's second season in the Umaglesi Liga.

== Season report ==
Dinamo Tbilisi played by the name FC Iberia Tbilisi.

== Current squad ==
No.	Name	Nationality	Birth date and age	Signed from	Notes
Goalkeepers
1	Nikoloz Chkheidze	(Georgia (country))	29 November 1968 (aged 22)	Torpedo Kutaisi	
16	Temur Chlaidze	(Georgia (country))			
Defenders
2	Malkhaz Arziani	(Georgia (country))	15 August 1964 (aged 26)	Guria Lanchkhuti	
3	Kakhaber Tskhadadze	(Georgia (country))	7 September 1968 (aged 22)	Metallurg Rustavi	Captain
4	Murtaz Shelia	(Georgia (country))	25 March 1969 (aged 22)	Amirani Ochamchire	
8	Gocha Chikovani	(Georgia (country))	12 October 1962 (aged 28)	Dinamo Batumi	
	Mamuka Machavariani	(Georgia (country))	27 November 1970 (aged 20)	Youth Sector	
	Givi Kveladze	(Georgia (country))	13 June 1970 (aged 21)	Magaroeli Chiatura	
Midfielders
5	Gia Jishkariani	(Georgia (country))	30 November 1967 (aged 23)	Guria Lanchkhuti	
6	Zaza Revishvili	(Georgia (country))	26 May 1968 (aged 23)	Youth Sector	
7	Temur Ketsbaia	(Georgia (country))	18 March 1968 (aged 23)	Youth Sector	
11	Kakhi Gogichaishvili	(Georgia (country))	31 October 1968 (aged 22)	Youth Sector	
	Gocha Jamarauli	(Georgia (country))	23 June 1971 (aged 20)	Youth Sector	
	Giorgi Nemsadze	(Georgia (country))	10 May 1972 (aged 19)	Youth Sector	
	Gela Inalishvili	(Georgia (country))	10 March 1966 (aged 25)	Tskhumi Sokhumi	
	Revaz Arveladze	(Georgia (country))	19 September 1969 (aged 21)	Martve Tbilisi	
Forwards
9	Kakhi Kacharava	(Georgia (country))	19 November 1966 (aged 24)	Torpedo Kutaisi	
10	Mikheil Kavelashvili	(Georgia (country))	22 June 1971 (aged 20)	Youth Sector	
	Shota Arveladze	(Georgia (country))	22 February 1973 (aged 18)	Martve Tbilisi	

== Statistics ==
=== Appearances, goals and disciplinary record ===
Pos.	Player	L App	L	L (yellow card)	L (red card)
GK	(Georgia (country)) Nikoloz Chkheidze	19	-9	0	0
GK	(Georgia (country)) Temur Chlaidze	3	0	0	0
DF	(Georgia (country)) Kakhaber Tskhadadze	12	1	0	0
DF	(Georgia (country)) Malkhaz Arziani	18	0	0	0
DF	(Georgia (country)) Murtaz Shelia	19	0	1	0
MF	(Georgia (country)) Zaza Revishvili	15	4	0	0
MF	(Georgia (country)) Temur Ketsbaia	17	4	0	0
FW	(Georgia (country)) Kakhi Kacharava	14	6	1	0
FW	(Georgia (country)) Mikheil Kavelashvili	19	12	0	0
DF	(Georgia (country)) Gocha Chikovani	15	0	0	0
DF	(Georgia (country)) Mamuka Machavariani	9	0	1	0
DF	(Georgia (country)) Givi Kveladze	2	0	0	0
MF	(Georgia (country)) Kakhi Gogichaishvili	13	2	0	0
MF	(Georgia (country)) Gia Jishkariani	18	4	1	0
MF	(Georgia (country)) Gocha Jamarauli	12	0	0	0
MF	(Georgia (country)) Giorgi Nemsadze	13	1	0	0
FW	(Georgia (country)) Shota Arveladze	7	3	0	0
MF	(Georgia (country)) Revaz Arveladze	3	1	0	0
MF	(Georgia (country)) Gela Inalishvili	19	4	1	0
	Disciplinary Committee for	-	3	-	-

=== Umaglesi Liga ===
==== League table ====
Pos	Team	Pld	W	D	L	GF	GA	GD	Pts
1	Iberia Tbilisi (C)	19	14	5	0	45	9	+36	47
2	Guria Lanchkhuti	19	14	4	1	38	15	+23	46
3	Kutaisi	19	11	2	6	34	30	+4	35
4	Kolkheti-1913 Poti	19	10	3	6	30	19	+11	33
5	Batumi	19	10	2	7	28	21	+7	32

Source: rsssf.org
Rules for classification: 1st points; 2nd matches won; 3rd head-to-head
(C) Champions

==== Matches ====
16 March 1991 1	Iberia Tbilisi	3 – 0	Alazani	Tbilisi
	Ketsbaia; Kacharava; Gogichaishvili			Stadium: Dinamo Arena

21 March 1991 2	Iberia Tbilisi	0 – 0	Guria	Tbilisi
	Kacharava (yellow card)		(yellow card) Tkebuchava	Stadium: Dinamo Arena

27 March 1991 3	Gorda	2 – 2	Iberia Tbilisi	Rustavi
	Avakian; Pantsulaia		Inalishvili	Stadium: Poladi Stadium

1 April 1991 4	Iberia Tbilisi	5 – 1	Kutaisi	Tbilisi
	Kavelashvili; Kacharava; Jishkariani; Sh. Arveladze		Dvalishvili; (yellow card) Shavgulidze	Stadium: Dinamo Arena

10 April 1991 5	Kolkheti-1913	1 – 2	Iberia Tbilisi	Poti
	Kobalia; Kajaia (yellow card)		Kacharava; Inalishvili	Stadium: Fazisi Stadium

14 April 1991 6	Iberia Tbilisi	3 – 0	Batumi	Tbilisi
	Revishvili; Tskhadadze; Kavelashvili			Stadium: Dinamo Arena

21 April 1991 7	Tskhumi	0 – 1	Iberia Tbilisi	Sokhumi
	Gogrichiani (yellow card)		Ketsbaia; (yellow card) Jishkariani	Stadium: Republic Stadium

25 April 1991 8	Iberia Tbilisi	1 – 0	Odishi	Tbilisi
	Gogichaishvili			Stadium: Dinamo Arena

12 May 1991 9	Kolkheti Khobi	0 – 3	Iberia Tbilisi	Khobi
				Stadium: Central Stadium
Note: The match is abandoned. Dinamo won with technical score 3:0.

16 May 1991 10	Iberia Tbilisi	6 – 0	Sanavardo	Tbilisi
	Kavelashvili; Ketsbaia; Inalishvili; Revishvili			Stadium: Dinamo Arena

19 May 1991 11	Mertskhali	0 – 2	Iberia Tbilisi	Ozurgeti
			Jishkariani; Kavelashvili	Stadium: Megobroba Stadium

22 May 1991 12	Mziuri	0 – 0	Iberia Tbilisi	Gali
				Stadium: Central Stadium

30 May 1991 13	Iberia Tbilisi	4 – 0	Samgurali	Tbilisi
	Jishkariani; Kacharava; Sh. Arveladze; Kavelashvili			Stadium: Dinamo Arena

3 June 1991 14	Iveria	0 – 2	Iberia Tbilisi	Khashuri
			Jishkariani; Revishvili	Stadium: Iveria Stadium

10 June 1991 15	Iberia Tbilisi	2 – 0	Shevardeni-1906	Tbilisi
	Sh. Arveladze; Kavelashvili			Stadium: Dinamo Arena

14 June 1991 16	Amirani	0 – 0	Iberia Tbilisi	Zugdidi
			(yellow card) Inalishvili	Stadium: Gulia Tutberidze Stadium

17 June 1991 17	Iberia Tbilisi	2 – 0	Dila Gori	Tbilisi
	Kavelashvili; Revishvili			Stadium: Dinamo Arena

21 June 1991 18	Iberia Tbilisi	4 – 2	Sulori	Tbilisi
	Kavelashvili; R. Arveladze; Ketsbaia		Buishvili; J. Verulashvili	Stadium: Dinamo Arena

25 June 1991 19	Margveti	3 – 3	Iberia Tbilisi	Zestaponi
	Jugheli; Kerdzevadze; Khujadze		Kacharava; Nemsadze	Stadium: David Abashidze Stadium
