= List of Georgia international footballers =

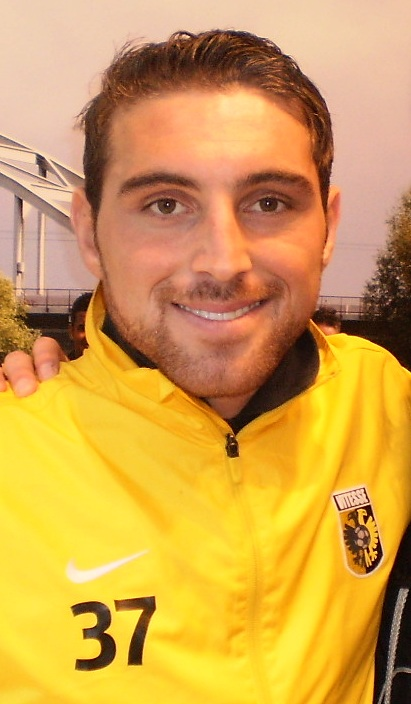
Guram Kashia is the most-capped Georgia international having appeared in 128 matches.

The Georgia national football team (Georgian: საქართველოს ეროვნული საფეხბურთო ნაკრები, romanized: sakartvelos erovnuli sapekhburto nak'rebi) represents the nation of Georgia in international association football. It is fielded by the Georgian Football Federation (Georgian: საქართველოს ფეხბურთის ფედერაცია), the governing body of football in Georgia, and competes as a member of the Union of European Football Associations (UEFA), which encompasses the countries of Europe. The team played its first official international match on 27 May 1990 against Lithuania.

Since its first competitive match, more than 200 players have made at least one international appearance for the team. As hundreds of players have played for the team since it started officially registering its players in 1990, only players with 10 or more official caps are included. Georgi Nemsadze became the first Georgian international to reach 10 caps, doing so on 26 June 1994 in a 3–1 win against Latvia. Defender Guram Kashia holds the record for most caps, appearing in 124 of official games for Georgia since 2008. Defender Zurab Khizanishvili had the longest national team career with Georgia, making his 92 appearances over 16-year period between 1999 and 2015. The goalscoring record is held by forward Shota Arveladze, scoring 26 times in 61 matches between 1992 and 2007, including two hat-tricks.

== Key ==
| § | Still active for the national team (Note: Players who are still active for the national team are players who haven't retired from international football and are, subsequently, eligible to be called up.) |
| § | Still active at club level |
| GK | Goalkeeper |
| DF | Defender |
| MF | Midfielder |
| FW | Forward |

== Players ==
Appearances and goals are composed of UEFA Nations League, UEFA European Championship qualification, FIFA World Cup qualification, Cyprus International Tournament, Malta International Tournament and international friendly matches. Players are listed by number of caps, then number of goals scored. If number of caps and goals are equal, the players are then listed alphabetically. Statistics correct as of match played on 23 March 2025.

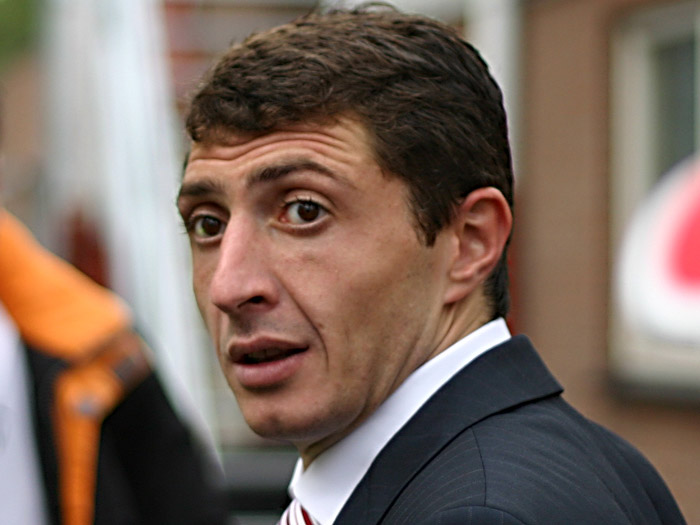
Shota Arveladze is the national team's all-time leading goal-scorer with 26 goals in 61 appearances.

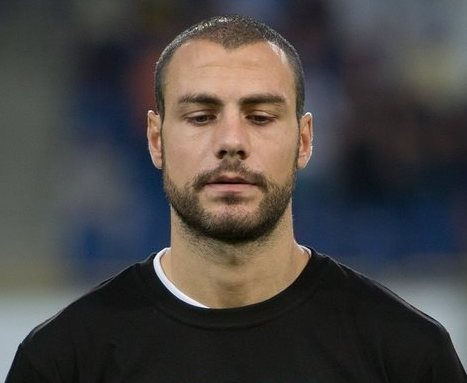
Jaba Kankava has made the most appearances as captain with 61 (101 caps in total).

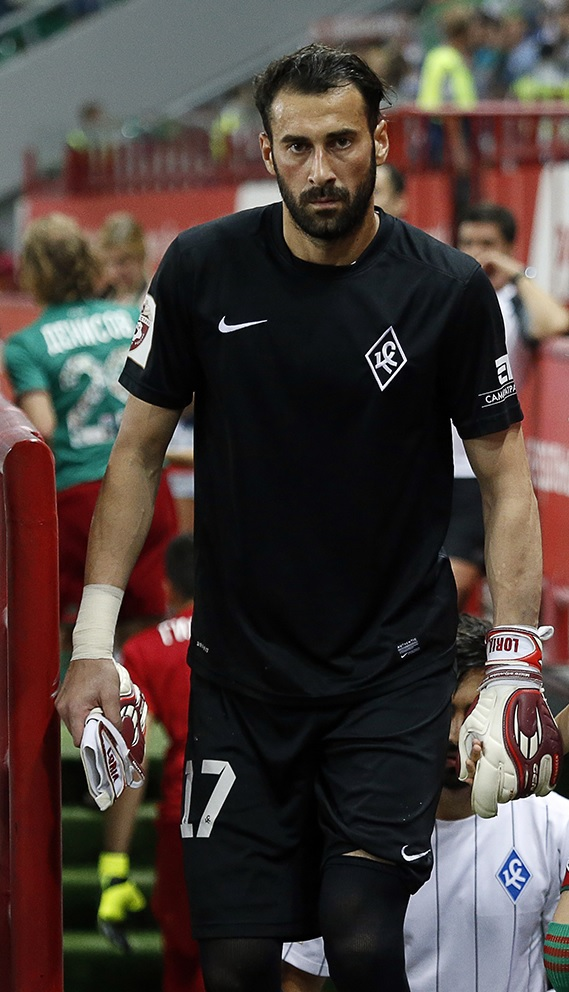
Giorgi Loria is Georgia's most-capped goalkeeper with 79 caps. He also holds the record for the longest national team career, spanning from his debut in 2008 to his retirement in 2025 (17 years).

Georgia national team football players with at least 10 appearances
| No. | Name | Position | National team career | Caps | Goals |
|---|---|---|---|---|---|
| 1 | Guram Kashia^{§} | DF | 2009–2026 | 129 | 3 |
| 2 | Jaba Kankava^{§} | MF | 2004–2024 | 101 | 10 |
| 3 | Levan Kobiashvili | MF | 1996–2011 | 100 | 12 |
| 4 | Zurab Khizanishvili | DF | 1999–2015 | 92 | 1 |
| 5 | Kakha Kaladze | DF | 1996–2011 | 83 | 1 |
| 6 | Giorgi Loria^{§} | GK | 2008–2025 | 79 | 0 |
| 7 | Otar Kakabadze^{§} | DF | 2015– | 77 | 0 |
| 8 | Georgi Nemsadze | MF | 1992–2004 | 69 | 0 |
| 9 | Aleksandre Iashvili | MF/FW | 1996–2011 | 67 | 15 |
| 10 | Gocha Jamarauli | MF | 1994–2004 | 62 | 6 |
| 10 | Solomon Kvirkvelia^{§} | DF | 2014–2024 | 62 | 0 |
| 10 | Valeri Qazaishvili^{§} | MF | 2014–2022 | 62 | 13 |
| 10 | Nika Kvekveskiri | MF | 2015–2025 | 62 | 0 |
| 14 | Shota Arveladze | FW | 1992-2007 | 61 | 26 |
| 15 | Davit Kvirkvelia | DF | 2003–2014 | 59 | 0 |
| 16 | Levan Tskitishvili | MF | 1995–2009 | 58 | 1 |
| 17 | Giorgi Demetradze | FW | 1996–2007 | 56 | 12 |
| 18 | Georgi Kinkladze | MF | 1992–2005 | 54 | 8 |
| 18 | Ucha Lobjanidze | DF | 2008–2017 | 54 | 1 |
| 18 | Otar Kiteishvili^{§} | MF | 2017– | 54 | 4 |
| 21 | Temur Ketsbaia | MF | 1990–2003 | 52 | 17 |
| 21 | Zuriko Davitashvili^{§} | MF | 2019– | 52 | 7 |
| 23 | Aleksandre Amisulashvili | DF | 2002–2016 | 50 | 4 |
| 23 | Tornike Okriashvili | MF | 2010–2021 | 50 | 13 |
| 23 | Khvicha Kvaratskhelia^{§} | FW | 2019– | 50 | 23 |
| 26 | Lasha Dvali^{§} | DF | 2015– | 48 | 1 |
| 27 | Mikheil Kavelashvili | FW | 1991–2002 | 46 | 9 |
| 28 | Giorgi Lomaia | GK | 1998–2010 | 45 | 0 |
| 28 | Jano Ananidze | MF | 2009–2019 | 45 | 7 |
| 30 | Giorgi Kvilitaia^{§} | FW | 2016– | 44 | 7 |
| 30 | Vladimir Dvalishvili | FW | 2009–2017 | 44 | 6 |
| 30 | Valerian Gvilia^{§} | MF | 2016–2022 | 44 | 3 |
| 33 | Budu Zivzivadze^{§} | FW | 2017– | 43 | 8 |
| 34 | Malkhaz Asatiani | DF/MF | 2001–2010 | 42 | 4 |
| 34 | Saba Lobzhanidze^{§} | MF | 2017– | 42 | 4 |
| 36 | Murtaz Daushvili | MF | 2008–2021 | 41 | 0 |
| 36 | Giorgi Navalovski | DF | 2008–2020 | 41 | 0 |
| 36 | Georges Mikautadze^{§} | FW | 2021– | 41 | 23 |
| 39 | Giorgi Chakvetadze^{§} | MF | 2018– | 39 | 10 |
| 39 | Zurab Menteshashvili | MF | 2000–2010 | 40 | 1 |
| 39 | Giorgi Aburjania^{§} | MF | 2016–2023 | 39 | 1 |
| 39 | David Khocholava | DF | 2017–2022 | 39 | 0 |
| 43 | Giorgi Mamardashvili^{§} | GK | 2021– | 38 | 0 |
| 43 | Lasha Salukvadze | DF | 2004–2015 | 38 | 1 |
| 45 | Aleksandre Kobakhidze | MF | 2006–2017 | 35 | 3 |
| 46 | Gia Grigalava | DF | 2011–2020 | 34 | 0 |
| 47 | Anzor Mekvabishvili^{§} | MF | 2022– | 33 | 0 |
| 48 | Archil Arveladze | FW | 1994–2001 | 32 | 6 |
| 48 | Giorgi Merebashvili | MF | 2008–2019 | 32 | 2 |
| 48 | Levan Mchedlidze | FW | 2007–2019 | 32 | 2 |
| 48 | Giorgi Shashiashvili | DF | 2001–2010 | 32 | 1 |
| 48 | Nukri Revishvili | GK | 2005–2016 | 32 | 0 |
| 48 | Luka Lochoshvili^{§} | DF | 2021– | 32 | 2 |
| 54 | Giorgi Tsitaishvili^{§} | MF | 2021– | 30 | 1 |
| 55 | Levan Kenia | MF | 2007–2016 | 29 | 4 |
| 55 | Murtaz Shelia | DF | 1991–1998 | 29 | 0 |
| 57 | Davit Siradze | FW | 2004–2011 | 28 | 8 |
| 57 | Rati Aleksidze | FW | 1998–2009 | 28 | 2 |
| 57 | Davit Gvaramadze | GK | 1998–2004 | 28 | 0 |
| 60 | Gogita Gogua | MF | 2005–2011 | 27 | 1 |
| 60 | Kakhaber Gogichaishvili | MF | 1992–2000 | 27 | 1 |
| 62 | Giorgi Kochorashvili^{§} | MF | 2023– | 26 | 4 |
| 63 | Irakli Azarovi^{§} | DF | 2021– | 25 | 0 |
| 63 | Kakhaber Tskhadadze (Note: Before the formation of the Georgia national team Kakhaber Tskhadadze made one appearance for the CIS national football team.) | DF | 1990–1998 | 25 | 1 |
| 63 | Davit Mujiri | MF | 2003–2008 | 25 | 1 |
| 63 | Nikoloz Gelashvili | FW | 2007–2015 | 25 | 1 |
| 67 | Mikheil Ashvetia | FW | 1996–2007 | 24 | 5 |
| 67 | Giorgi Chikhradze | DF | 1994–2000 | 24 | 0 |
| 67 | Nika Kacharava^{§} | FW | 2016–2020 | 24 | 3 |
| 70 | Jaba Jighauri | MF | 2016–2023 | 23 | 0 |
| 70 | Levan Shengelia^{§} | MF | 2019– | 23 | 1 |
| 72 | Gela Shekiladze | DF | 1997–2002 | 22 | 0 |
| 73 | Giorgi Gocholeishvili^{§} | DF | 2022– | 21 | 0 |
| 73 | Giorgi Gakhokidze | MF/FW | 1996–2006 | 21 | 3 |
| 73 | Vladimir Burduli | MF | 2001–2007 | 21 | 2 |
| 73 | Otar Martsvaladze | FW | 2006–2014 | 21 | 2 |
| 73 | Givi Didava | DF | 1996–2003 | 21 | 0 |
| 73 | Aleksandre Rekhviashvili | MF | 1999–2005 | 21 | 0 |
| 73 | Levan Silagadze | DF | 1998–2001 | 21 | 0 |
| 80 | David Targamadze | MF | 2011–2014 | 20 | 2 |
| 80 | Dimitri Kudinov | DF | 1990–1996 | 20 | 1 |
| 80 | Revaz Kemoklidze | DF | 2000–2004 | 20 | 0 |
| 80 | Akaki Devadze | GK | 1992–2005 | 20 | 0 |
| 80 | Otar Khizaneishvili | DF | 1999–2007 | 20 | 0 |
| 80 | Akaki Khubutia | DF | 2010–2014 | 20 | 0 |
| 86 | Irakli Zoidze | GK | 1994–2001 | 19 | 0 |
| 87 | Giorgi Papunashvili^{§} | MF | 2014–2020 | 17 | 2 |
| 87 | Giorgi Makaridze^{§} | GK | 2007–2020 | 17 | 0 |
| 89 | Mate Vatsadze | FW | 2009–2016 | 15 | 4 |
| 89 | Giorgi Chanturia | MF | 2014–2017 | 15 | 2 |
| 89 | Ilia Kandelaki | DF | 2004–2013 | 15 | 0 |
| 89 | Jemal Tabidze^{§} | DF | 2017– | 15 | 1 |
| 89 | Vladimer Mamuchashvili^{§} | MF | 2021– | 15 | 0 |
| 94 | David Odikadze | DF | 2005–2009 | 14 | 0 |
| 94 | Kakhaber Mzhavanadze | DF | 2004–2006 | 14 | 0 |
| 96 | Lasha Jakobia | FW | 2004–2008 | 13 | 1 |
| 96 | Nugzar Lobzhanidze | DF | 1993–1997 | 13 | 0 |
| 98 | Zaza Revishvili | MF | 1990–1996 | 12 | 0 |
| 98 | Levan Khmaladze | MF | 2008–2014 | 12 | 0 |
| 98 | Mamuka Tsereteli | DF | 1998–2004 | 12 | 0 |
| 98 | Giorgi Popkhadze | DF | 2006–2015 | 12 | 0 |
| 98 | Guram Giorbelidze^{§} | DF | 2021– | 12 | 0 |
| 98 | Shota Grigalashvili | MF | 2006–2013 | 12 | 0 |
| 104 | Giorgi Kiknadze | MF | 1996–1999 | 11 | 1 |
| 104 | Beka Gotsiridze | FW | 2008–2009 | 11 | 1 |
| 104 | Revaz Arveladze | MF | 1992–2000 | 11 | 1 |
| 104 | Luka Razmadze | MF | 2008–2009 | 11 | 0 |
| 104 | Aleksandr Kvakhadze | DF | 2007–2009 | 11 | 0 |
| 104 | Nikoloz Togonidze | GK | 1996–1999 | 11 | 0 |
| 110 | Saba Goglichidze^{§} | DF | 2025– | 10 | 0 |
| 110 | Davit Janashia | FW | 1992–1999 | 10 | 3 |
| 110 | Irakli Dzaria | MF | 2012–2014 | 10 | 1 |
| 110 | Gela Inalishvili | MF | 1994–1996 | 10 | 0 |
| 110 | Giorgi Ganugrava | MF | 2005–2017 | 10 | 0 |
| 110 | Vitaly Daraselia | MF | 2002–2005 | 10 | 0 |
| 110 | Soso Grishikashvili | GK | 1994–2000 | 10 | 0 |
| 110 | Tengiz Sichinava | MF | 1999–2000 | 10 | 0 |
| 110 | Elguja Lobjanidze^{§} | FW | 2017–2020 | 10 | 0 |
| 110 | Giorgi Gvelesiani^{§} | FW | 2024–2025 | 10 | 0 |
| 110 | Giorgi Beridze^{§} | FW | 2018– | 10 | 0 |
