= 1990 FC Dinamo Tbilisi season =

Dinamo Tbilisi
1990 season
- Manager: David Kipiani
- Stadium: Dinamo stadium, Tbilisi
- Umaglesi Liga: 1st (1st title)
- Georgian Cup: Semifinals
- Top goalscorer: Gia Guruli (23)

Dinamo Tbilisi's first season in the 1990 Umaglesi Liga.

== Season report ==
In 1990 the Georgian Football Federation refused to participate in the Soviet Union championship. That meant that no Georgian Football Clubs would appear in Soviet tournaments. From that moment the more recent history of FC Dinamo Tbilisi began.

The club played its first match in the Georgian National championship against Kolkheti-1913 Poti on 30 March 1990. Dinamo lost the historic match, 0–1. Ultimately the club recovered from this setback and won the first Georgian National championship.

Dinamo Tbilisi played by the name FC Iberia Tbilisi.

== Current squad ==
No.	Name	Nationality	Birth date and age	Signed from	Notes
Goalkeepers
1	Zaur Khapov	(Russia)	21 October 1964 (aged 26)	(Russia) Shinnik Yaroslavl	
16	Akaki Devadze	(Georgia (country))	28 November 1971 (aged 18)	Dila Gori	
Defenders
2	Gela Ketashvili	(Georgia (country))	27 September 1965 (aged 25)	Torpedo Kutaisi	
3	Kakhaber Tskhadadze	(Georgia (country))	7 September 1968 (aged 22)	Metallurg Rustavi	Captain
4	Soso Chedia	(Georgia (country))	9 October 1965 (aged 25)	Guria Lanchkhuti	
5	Malkhaz Arziani	(Georgia (country))	15 August 1964 (aged 26)	Guria Lanchkhuti	
8	Gocha Chikovani	(Georgia (country))	12 October 1962 (aged 28)	Dinamo Batumi	
	Mamuka Machavariani	(Georgia (country))	27 November 1970 (aged 19)	Youth Sector	
	Givi Kveladze	(Georgia (country))	13 June 1970 (aged 20)	Magaroeli Chiatura	
Midfielders
6	Zaza Revishvili	(Georgia (country))	26 May 1968 (aged 22)	Youth Sector	
7	Temur Ketsbaia	(Georgia (country))	18 March 1968 (aged 22)	Youth Sector	
9	Grigol Tsaava	(Georgia (country))	5 January 1962 (aged 28)	Guria Lanchkhuti	
11	Kakhi Gogichaishvili	(Georgia (country))	31 October 1968 (aged 22)	Youth Sector	
	Gia Jishkariani	(Georgia (country))	30 November 1967 (aged 22)	Guria Lanchkhuti	
	Gocha Jamarauli	(Georgia (country))	23 June 1971 (aged 19)	Youth Sector	
	Giorgi Nemsadze	(Georgia (country))	10 May 1972 (aged 18)	Youth Sector	
	Temur Kipiani	(Georgia (country))			
Forwards
10	Gia Guruli	(Georgia (country))	20 May 1964 (aged 26)	Guria Lanchkhuti	
	Kakhi Kacharava	(Georgia (country))	19 November 1966 (aged 23)	Torpedo Kutaisi	
	Roin Kerdzevadze	(Georgia (country))	26 September 1970 (aged 20)	Youth Sector	
	Davit Kizilashvili	(Georgia (country))	20 January 1971 (aged 19)	Youth Sector	
	Mikheil Kavelashvili	(Georgia (country))	22 June 1971 (aged 19)	Youth Sector	
	Emzar Shonia	(Georgia (country))			

== Statistics ==
=== Appearances, goals and disciplinary record ===
Pos.	Player	L App	L	L (yellow card)	L (red card)
GK	(Russia) Zaur Khapov	29	-19	0	0
GK	(Georgia (country)) Akaki Devadze	8	-4	0	0
DF	(Georgia (country)) Gela Ketashvili	9	0	0	0
DF	(Georgia (country)) Kakhaber Tskhadadze	32	1	0	0
DF	(Georgia (country)) Soso Chedia	26	0	0	0
DF	(Georgia (country)) Malkhaz Arziani	18	0	0	0
MF	(Georgia (country)) Zaza Revishvili	34	16	0	0
MF	(Georgia (country)) Temur Ketsbaia	33	11	1	1
FW	(Georgia (country)) Kakhi Kacharava	28	14	3	0
FW	(Georgia (country)) Mikheil Kavelashvili	13	5	0	0
DF	(Georgia (country)) Gocha Chikovani	32	2	0	0
DF	(Georgia (country)) Mamuka Machavariani	24	0	0	0
DF	(Georgia (country)) Givi Kveladze	13	0	1	0
MF	(Georgia (country)) Grigol Tsaava	8	3	0	0
MF	(Georgia (country)) Kakhi Gogichaishvili	32	4	2	0
MF	(Georgia (country)) Gia Jishkariani	31	6	0	0
MF	(Georgia (country)) Gocha Jamarauli	19	0	0	0
MF	(Georgia (country)) Giorgi Nemsadze	14	2	0	0
MF	(Georgia (country)) Temur Kipiani	3	0	0	0
FW	(Georgia (country)) Gia Guruli	25	23	1	0
FW	(Georgia (country)) Roin Kerdzevadze	8	1	0	0
FW	(Georgia (country)) Davit Kizilashvili	10	2	0	0
FW	(Georgia (country)) Emzar Shonia	5	0	0	0
	Own goals for	-	1	-	-

== Competitions ==
=== Umaglesi Liga ===
==== League table ====
Pos	Team	Pld	W	D	L	GF	GA	GD	Pts
1	Iberia Tbilisi (C)	34	24	6	4	91	23	+68	78
2	Guria Lanchkhuti	34	22	6	6	73	20	+53	72
3	Gorda Rustavi	34	22	3	9	63	33	+30	69
4	Kutaisi	34	20	5	9	62	33	+29	65
5	Kolkheti-1913 Poti	34	19	5	10	53	31	+22	62

Source: rsssf.org
Rules for classification: 1st points; 2nd matches won; 3rd head-to-head
(C) Champions

==== Matches ====
30 March 1990 1	Iberia Tbilisi	0 – 1	Kolkheti-1913	Tbilisi
			((o.g.)) Ketashvili	Stadium: Dinamo Arena

4 April 1990 2	Gorda	1 – 1	Iberia Tbilisi	Rustavi
	Pantsulaia		Guruli	Stadium: Poladi Stadium

12 April 1990 3	Iberia Tbilisi	5 – 0	Dila Gori	Tbilisi
	Ketsbaia; Tskhadadze; Tsaava; Guruli		(yellow card) Kondratiev	Stadium: Dinamo Arena

17 April 1990 4	Iberia Tbilisi	4 – 1	Liakhvi	Tbilisi
	Revishvili; Tsaava; Guruli; Kacharava		M. Sanakoev; (yellow card) V. Khubejishvili	Stadium: Dinamo Arena

22 April 1990 5	Iberia Tbilisi	6 – 0	Amirani	Tbilisi
	Kacharava; Ketsbaia; Tsaava; Guruli; Gogichaishvili		(yellow card) Akhvlediani	Stadium: Dinamo Arena

29 April 1990 6	Odishi	1 – 1	Iberia Tbilisi	Zugdidi
	Tibua		Guruli	Stadium: Gulia Tutberidze Stadium

2 May 1990 7	Iberia Tbilisi	2 – 0	Shevardeni-1906	Tbilisi
	Revishvili; Ketsbaia; Guruli			Stadium: Dinamo Arena

6 May 1990 8	Kolkheti Khobi	1 – 2	Iberia Tbilisi	Khobi
	Gvasalia		Revishvili; Ketsbaia; (yellow card) Gogichaishvili	Stadium: Central Stadium

11 May 1990 9	Iberia Tbilisi	1 – 1	Tskhumi	Tbilisi
	Revishvili		Gogrichiani; (yellow card) Parulava; (yellow card) Papava	Stadium: Dinamo Arena

15 May 1990 10	Kutaisi	0 – 2	Iberia Tbilisi	Kutaisi
			Revishvili; Guruli	Stadium: Givi Kiladze Stadium

20 May 1990 11	Iberia Tbilisi	8 – 1	Mertskhali	Tbilisi
	Kacharava; Guruli; Revishvili; Ketsbaia		Kashia	Stadium: Dinamo Arena

10 June 1990 12	Batumi	2 – 0	Iberia Tbilisi	Batumi
	Durdiadze; Tughushi		(yellow card) Kacharava; (red card) Ketsbaia	Stadium: Dinamo Stadium

16 June 1990 13	Iberia Tbilisi	7 – 1	Samgurali	Tbilisi
	Kacharava; Guruli; Revishvili; Chikovani; Gogichaishvili		Pestvenidze	Stadium: Dinamo Arena

20 June 1990 14	Iberia Tbilisi	1 – 1	Guria	Tbilisi
	Ketsbaia		(yellow card) Tkebuchava	Stadium: Dinamo Arena

25 June 1990 15	Iberia Tbilisi	3 – 1	Mziuri	Tbilisi
	Gogichaishvili; Kavelashvili; Ghurtskaia ((o.g))		Gabisonia	Stadium: Dinamo Arena

30 June 1990 16	Iveria	0 – 3	Iberia Tbilisi	Gori
			Revishvili; Kizilashvili	Stadium: Tengiz Burjanadze Stadium

1 August 1990 17	Sanavardo	0 – 1	Iberia Tbilisi	Samtredia
			Guruli	Stadium: Erosi Manjgaladze Stadium

9 August 1990 18	Iberia Tbilisi	0 – 1	Gorda	Tbilisi
			Pantsulaia; (yellow card) Kasrashvili	Stadium: Dinamo Arena

13 August 1990 19	Dila Gori	0 – 3	Iberia Tbilisi	Gori
	Kondratiev (yellow card)		Ketsbaia; Kizilashvili	Stadium: Tengiz Burjanadze Stadium

17 August 1990 20	Iberia Tbilisi	7 – 0	Liakhvi	Tbilisi
	Revishvili; Jishkariani; Kavelashvili; Kerdzevadze		(yellow card) Kakhniashvili	Stadium: Dinamo Arena

24 August 1990 21	Amirani	0 – 2	Iberia Tbilisi	Gali
			Ketsbaia; Chikovani	Stadium: Vitaly Daraselia Stadium

1 September 1990 22	Iberia Tbilisi	4 – 2	Odishi	Tbilisi
	Guruli; Kacharava (yellow card); Jishkariani		M. Jikia; Sherozia; (yellow card) Kvitatiani	Stadium: Dinamo Arena

9 September 1990 23	Shevardeni-1906	1 – 3	Iberia Tbilisi	Tbilisi
	L. Kipiani		Guruli; Revishvili; Ketsbaia	Stadium: Shevardeni Stadium

15 September 1990 24	Iberia Tbilisi	5 – 0	Kolkheti Khobi	Tbilisi
	Guruli; Revishvili; Kavelashvili			Stadium: Dinamo Arena

23 September 1990 25	Tskhumi	1 – 1	Iberia Tbilisi	Sokhumi
	Inalishvili		Kavelashvili; (yellow card) Kveladze	Stadium: Republic Stadium

27 September 1990 26	Kolkheti-1913	1 – 2	Iberia Tbilisi	Poti
	Tvaradze		Kavelashvili; Jishkariani	Stadium: Fazisi Stadium

1 October 1990 27	Iberia Tbilisi	2 – 0	Kutaisi	Tbilisi
	Jishkariani; Kacharava (yellow card)			Stadium: Dinamo Arena

5 October 1990 28	Mertskhali	1 – 4	Iberia Tbilisi	Ozurgeti
	Chigogidze		Guruli; Revishvili; Nemsadze	Stadium: Megobroba Stadium

14 October 1990 29	Iberia Tbilisi	4 – 0	Sanavardo	Tbilisi
	Kacharava; Nemsadze			Stadium: Dinamo Arena

19 October 1990 30	Guria	0 – 1	Iberia Tbilisi	Lanchkhuti
	C		Ketsbaia; (yellow card) Gogichaishvili	Stadium: Evgrapi Shevardnadze Stadium

29 October 1990 31	Iberia Tbilisi	3 – 1	Batumi	Tbilisi
	Jishkariani; Kacharava; Gogichaishvili		Machutadze	Stadium: Dinamo Arena

3 November 1990 32	Samgurali	0 – 0	Iberia Tbilisi	Tskaltubo
				Stadium: 26 May Stadium

8 November 1990 33	Mziuri	3 – 2	Iberia Tbilisi	Gali
	Gabisonia; Baltushnikas		Guruli	Stadium: Central Stadium

12 November 1990 34	Iberia Tbilisi	1 – 0	Iveria	Tbilisi
	Revishvili		(yellow card) Robakidze	Stadium: Dinamo Arena

=== Georgian Cup ===
Round	Opponents	Aggregate	Home	Away
Round of 32	Krtsanisi	8–2	3–2	5–0
Round of 16	Martve	8–2	6–0	2–2
Quarterfinals	Kolkheti-1913	7–5	3–0	4–5
Semifinals	Guria	0–3	0–1	0–2
