= Davit (given name) =

Davit (Georgian: დავით, Armenian: Դավիթ) is a masculine given name of Georgian and Armenian origin, an equivalent of David, meaning "beloved". According to the Public Service Hall, it is among the top 10 most common Georgian given names for males, and as of 2012 is among the top 10 most common Armenian given names for males according to the Statistical Committee of Armenia.

Notable people with the given name include:

- Davit I (disambiguation), multiple people
- Davit II (disambiguation), multiple people
- Davit III (disambiguation), multiple people
- Davit IV (disambiguation), multiple people
- Davit V (disambiguation), multiple people
- Davit Aghajanyan (born 1992), Armenian actor and model
- David the Rector (real name Davit Aleksidze-Meskhishvili; 1745–1824), Georgian pedagogue, calligrapher and rector
- Davit Ananun (1880–1942), Armenian historian, journalist and socialist activist
- Davit Askurava (born 1990), Georgian track cyclist
- Davit Aslanadze (born 1976), Georgian footballer
- Davit Bakradze (born 1975), Georgian diplomat and politician
- Davit Bek (died 1728), Armenian military commander
- Davit Benidze (born 1991), Georgian chess player
- Davit Bolkvadze (born 1980), Georgian footballer
- Davit Chakvetadze (born 1992), Georgian-born Russian Greco-Roman wrestler
- Davit Chaloyan (born 1997), Armenian boxer
- Davit Chichveishvili (born 1975), Georgian footballer
- Dave Coskunian (real name Davit Çoşkun; born 1948), Turkish-American footballer
- Davit Devdariani (born 1987), Georgian footballer
- Davit Dighmelashvili (born 1980), Georgian footballer
- Davit Gabaidze (born 1980), Georgian politician
- Davit Gabunia (born 1982), Georgian translator, playwright and author
- Davit Gharibyan (born 1990), Armenian model, actor director, host and publisher
- Davit Gigauri (born 1994), Georgian rugby union player
- Davit Goderdzishvili (born 1976), Georgian footballer
- Davit Gogichaishvili (born 1981), Georgian economist and government official
- Davit Gotsiridze (born 2004), Georgian footballer
- Davit Guramishvili (1705–1792), Georgian poet
- Davit Gvaramadze (born 1975), Georgian footballer
- Davit Hakobyan (born 1993), Armenian footballer
- Davit Harutyunyan (born 1963), Armenian politician
- Davit Iashvili (born 1992), Georgian-born Ukrainian footballer
- Davit Imedashvili (born 1984), Georgian footballer
- Davit Ishkhanyan (born 1968), Armenian politician
- Davit Janashia (born 1972), Georgian head coach and footballer
- Davit Janelidze (born 1973), Georgian footballer
- Davit Kacharava (born 1985), Georgian rugby union player
- Davit Kajaia (born 1984), Georgian racing driver
- Davit Kereselidze (born 1999), Georgian footballer
- Davit Kezerashvili (born 1978), Jewish-Georgian investor, entrepreneur and politician
- Davit Khinchagishvili (born 1982), Georgian rugby union player
- Davit Kiria (born 1988), Georgian kickboxer
- Davit Kirkitadze (born 1978), Georgian politician
- Davit Khajishvili (born 1988), Georgian businessman and politician
- Davit Khinchagishvili (born 1982), Georgian rugby union footballer
- Davit Khocholava (born 1993), Georgian footballer
- Davit Khutsishvili (born 1990), Georgian freestyle wrestler
- Davit Kizilashvili (born 1971), Georgian footballer
- Davit Kobouri (born 1998), Georgian footballer
- Davit Kokhia (born 1993), Georgian footballer
- Davit Kubriashvili (born 1986), Georgian rugby union player
- Davit Kvirkvelia (born 1980), Georgian football manager and player
- Davit Lokyan (born 1958), Armenian politician
- Davit Lomaia (born 1985), Georgian footballer
- Davit Makharadze (born 1965), Georgian footballer and manager
- Davit Mchedlishvili (born 1988), Georgian footballer
- Davit Modzmanashvili (born 1986), Georgian freestyle wrestler
- Davit Mujiri (born 1978), Georgian footballer
- Davit Narmania (born 1979), Georgian politician
- Davit Niniashvili (born 2002), Georgian rugby union player
- Davit Oniashvili (1883–1937), Georgian politician
- Davit G. Petrosian (born 1984), Armenian chess player
- Davit Poghosyan, Armenian historian, professor and museum curator
- Davit Sergeenko (born 1963), Georgian physician and healthcare administrator
- Davit Skhirtladze (born 1993), Georgian footballer
- Davit Sujashvili (born 1976), Georgian government official
- Davit Terteryan (born 1997), Armenian footballer
- Davit Tsomaia (born 1967), Georgian footballer
- Davit Ubilava (born 1994), Georgian footballer
- Davit Volkovi (born 1995), Georgian footballer
- Davit Zirakashvili (born 1983), Georgian rugby union player

== See also ==
- Davit Bek, Armenia, a village in Syunik Province, Armenia
