= Grigol Chanturia =

Georgian footballer

Personal information
- Full name: Grigol Chanturia
- Date of birth: 25 September 1973 (age 53)
- Place of birth: Samtredia, Soviet Union
- Height: 1.87 m (6 ft 2 in)
- Position: Goalkeeper

Senior career*
Years	Team	Apps	(Gls)
1991–1992	Dila Gori	49	(0)
1992–1993	Samtredia	10	(0)
1993–1994	Shevardeni-1906 Tbilisi	17	(0)
1994–1996	Samtredia	49	(0)
1997	Lokomotiv-d Saint Petersburg	5	(0)
1998–2000	Torpedo Kutaisi	41	(0)
2001–2002	Dinamo Batumi	43	(0)
2002–2003	Torpedo Kutaisi	25	(0)
2003–2004	Tavriya Simferopol	15	(0)
2005	Zakarpattia Uzhhorod	1	(0)
2005	Lokomotivi Tbilisi	14	(0)
2006–2008	Zestaponi	60	(0)
2009	Sioni Bolnisi	13	(0)
2009–2011	FC Metalurgi Rustavi	38	(0)

International career^{‡}
1999–2006	Georgia	6	(0)
- * Club domestic league appearances and goals as of 7 February 2011 ‡ National team caps and goals as of 4 October 2008

Grigol (Giorgi) Chanturia (Georgian: გრიგოლ (გიორგი) ჭანტურია; born 25 September 1973) is a Georgian retired footballer.

== Career ==
Chanturia was a regular for Torpedo Kutaisi until the arrival of international footballer Nikoloz Togonidze, Irakli Zoidze, Davit Gvaramadze and Zviad Sturua.

=== International career ===
Chanturia played for Georgia as backup of Giorgi Lomaia.
