= Mamuka =

Mamuka (Georgian: მამუკა) is a masculine Georgian given name. It may refer to

- Mamuka of Imereti (fl. 1719–1769), member of the Bagrationi dynasty of Imereti
- Prince Mamuka of Imereti (died 1654), member of the Bagrationi dynasty of Imereti
- Mamuka, Prince of Mukhrani (died 1751), Georgian prince
- Mamuka Gorgodze (born 1984), Georgian rugby union player
- Mamuka Japharidze (born 1962), Georgian artist
- Mamuka Jugeli (born 1969), Georgian football player and manager
- Mamuka Kikaleishvili (1960–2000), Georgian actor
- Mamuka Kikalishvili (born 1971), Georgian fashion photographer
- Mamuka Kobakhidze (born 1992), Georgian football player
- Mamuka Kurashvili (born 1970), Georgian general
- Mamuka Lomidze (born 1984), Georgian football player
- Mamuka Machavariani (born 1970), Georgian football player
- Mamuka Magrakvelidze (born 1977), a Georgian rugby union player
- Mamuka Minashvili (born 1971), Georgian football player
- Mamuka Tavakalashvili, Georgian poet, painter and calligrapher of the 17th century
- Mamuka Tsereteli (born 1979), Georgian football player
