= Rostom Torgashvili =

Georgian footballer (born 1964)

Personal information
- Full name: Rostom Otarovich Torgashvili
- Date of birth: 15 December 1964 (age 61)
- Place of birth: Signagi, Georgian SSR, Soviet Union
- Height: 1.79 m (5 ft 10 in)
- Position: Midfielder

Senior career*
Years	Team	Apps	(Gls)
1982	Dinamo Tbilisi	0	(0)
1983–1984	Dila Gori	43	(11)
1984–1988	Dinamo Batumi	124	(4)
1989–1990	Torpedo Kutaisi	61	(11)
1991–1992	Gorda Rustavi	57	(9)
1992–1999	Dinamo Batumi	178	(34)
Total		463	(69)

International career
1990	Georgia	1	(0)
- * Club domestic league appearances and goals

Rostom Otarovich Torgashvili (Georgian: როსტომ თორღაშვილი; born 15 December 1964) is a Georgian former footballer who played as a midfielder and made one appearance for the Georgia national team.

== Career ==
Torgashvili earned his first and only cap for Georgia on 27 May 1990 in the country's first international match, a friendly against Lithuania. He came on as a half-time substitute for Zaza Revishvili in the home fixture, which took place in Tbilisi and finished as a 2–2 draw.

== Career statistics ==
=== International ===
Georgia
Year	Apps	Goals
1990	1	0
Total	1	0
