= Murtaz =

Masculine given name

Murtaz (Georgian: მურთაზ; Russian: Муртаз) is a masculine given name. Notable people with the name include:

- Murtaz Daushvili (born 1989), Georgian football defensive midfielder
- Murtaz Khurtsilava (born 1943), Georgian football defender
- Murtaz Shelia (born 1969), Georgian football defender
