= Shelia (surname) =

Shelia (Georgian: შელია) is a Georgian surname. Notable people with the surname include:

- Giorgi Shelia (born 1988), Russian footballer of Georgian origin
- Murtaz Shelia (born 1969), Georgian former footballer
- Viktoria Shelia (born 2000), Georgian rhythmic gymnast
