= Minashvili =

Minashvili (Georgian: მინაშვილი) is a Georgian surname. Notable people with the surname include:

- Akaki Minashvili (born 1980), Georgian politician
- Guram Minashvili (1935–2015), Georgian basketball player
- Mamuka Minashvili (born 1971), Georgian football player
