= Yevheniy Lozovyi =

Ukrainian footballer

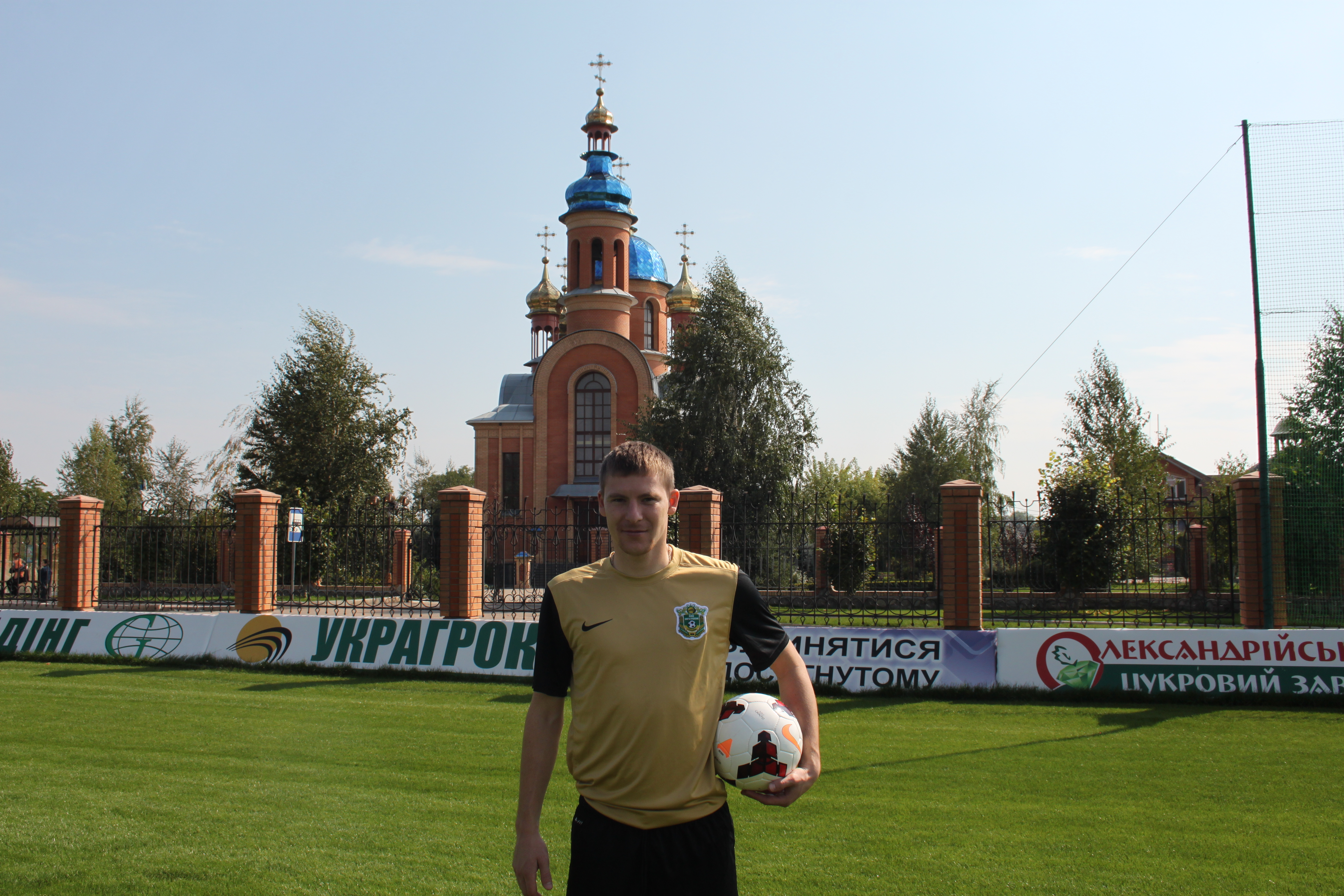
- Lozovyi in 2013

Personal information
- Full name: Yevheniy Viktorovych Lozovyi
- Date of birth: 25 March 1988 (age 38)
- Place of birth: Kharkiv, Ukrainian SSR
- Height: 1.78 m (5 ft 10 in)
- Position: Midfielder

Team information
- Current team: Shevardeni-1906 Tbilisi
- Number: 15

Senior career*
Years	Team	Apps	(Gls)
2007–2011	Metalist Kharkiv	0	(0)
2011–2013	Helios Kharkiv	36	(4)
2013–2014	UkrAhroKom Holovkivka	26	(1)
2014–2015	Hirnyk-Sport Komsomolsk	24	(2)
2015–2016	Dacia Chișinău	7	(0)
2016–2017	Naftovyk-Ukrnafta Okhtyrka	30	(7)
2017–2018	Rukh Vynnyky	27	(2)
2018–2020	Hirnyk-Sport Horishni Plavni	52	(6)
2020–2021	Metal Kharkiv	11	(1)
2021–	Viktoriya Mykolaivka	19	(1)
2022–	Shevardeni-1906 Tbilisi	12	(2)
- * Club domestic league appearances and goals as of 22 May 2022

Yevheniy Lozovyi (Ukrainian: Євгеній Вікторович Лозовий; born 25 March 1988) is a Ukrainian football midfielder who plays for Viktoriya Mykolaivka.

Lozovyi is a product of the Kharkiv city youth sportive school. In June 2015 he signed a contract with Moldavian FC Dacia Chișinău.

== Honours ==
Metal Kharkiv

- Ukrainian Second League: 2020–21
