= Nika Basariya =

Belarusian footballer

Personal information
- Date of birth: 21 September 1999 (age 27)
- Place of birth: Minsk, Belarus
- Position: Defender

Team information
- Current team: Vitebsk
- Number: 55

Youth career
- 2014–2017: Dinamo Minsk
- 2017–2018: UE Cornellà

Senior career*
Years	Team	Apps	(Gls)
2018	Luch Minsk	0	(0)
2019–2020	Vitebsk	5	(0)
2021–	Shevardeni-1906 Tbilisi	9	(0)

International career^{‡}
2015	Belarus U17	3	(0)
2019	Belarus U21	1	(0)
- * Club domestic league appearances and goals as of 29 April 2022 ‡ National team caps and goals as of 26 March 2019

Nika Basariya (Belarusian: Ніка Басарыя; Russian: Ника Басария; born 21 September 1999) is a Belarusian professional footballer who plays for Shevardeni-1906 Tbilisi.
