= Davit Gogichaishvili =

Georgian economist (born 1981)

Davit Gogichaishvili დავით გოგიჩაიშვილი

Deputy Auditor General of Georgia
- Incumbent
- Assumed office October 2017

Personal details
- Born: 18 August 1981 (age 45) Tbilisi
- Education: Tbilisi State University

Davit Gogichaishvili (Georgian: დავით გოგიჩაიშვილი; born August 18, 1981) is a Georgian economist, who has served as Deputy Auditor General of Georgia since October 2017.

== Working Experience ==
Ltd. Geo Farm Holding — Co-Founder and CEO (2017); Khareba LLC — Diredctor (2017); JSC TBC Bank — Head of Problem Loans and Assets Management Department (2011–2016), Senior Corporate Recovery Manager (2009-2011), Corporate Finance Analyst (2008-2009); Agricom LTD — Financial Director (2007-2008) Director (2005-2007); Georgian Industrial Company LTD — Financial Advisor (2006-2007); Agrosystems LTD — Deputy Chief Accountant (2004-2005); Georgian Railway LTD — Economist (2004).

== Education ==
Georgian Federation of Professional Accountants and Auditors, Association of Chartered Certified Accountants (ACCA) Program (2003-2004); Tbilisi State University — MSc, Economics (2002-2004); Tbilisi State University, BSc, Economics (1998-2002); Georgian State Agrarian University — BSc, Food Technology (1998-2002).

Besides native Georgian, speaks English and Russian languages.
