= Dimitri Kudinov =

Georgian footballer

Personal information
- Full name: Dimitri Vasilyevich Kudinov
- Date of birth: 8 February 1963 (age 63)
- Place of birth: Tbilisi, Georgian SSR
- Height: 1.80 m (5 ft 11 in)
- Position: Defender

Senior career*
Years	Team	Apps	(Gls)
1981–1984	FC Dinamo Tbilisi	3	(0)
1985	FC Torpedo Kutaisi	28	(0)
1986–1987	FC Dinamo Tbilisi	29	(0)
1989	Shevardeni Tbilisi	50	(1)
1990–1991	FC Gorda Rustavi	14	(5)
1991–1993	FC Dinamo Tbilisi	50	(1)
1993–1994	APOEL	19	(0)
1996–1997	FC Dinamo Tbilisi	6	(0)
1997	FC Zhemchuzhina Sochi	7	(0)
1998	FC Gorda Rustavi	10	(0)

International career
1992–1996	Georgia	17	(1)
- * Club domestic league appearances and goals

Dimitri Vasilyevich Kudinov (Russian: Дмитрий Васильевич Кудинов; born 8 February 1963 in Tbilisi) is a retired Georgian professional footballer. He made his professional debut in the Soviet Top League in 1982 for FC Dinamo Tbilisi.

== Honours ==
- Umaglesi Liga champion: 1996, 1997.
