= Mamuka Kikalishvili =

Georgian photographer

- Born: November 15, 1971 (age 53)
- Occupation: Georgian photographer

Mamuka Kikalishvili (born November 15, 1971) is a Georgian fashion photographer. His works has been featured in magazines such as L'Officiel (Az), Harper's Bazaar (Ru), Boutique (Az), Nargis (Az), etc. Since August 2013 he became head photographer of L'Officiel (Az).

He is also the owner of fashion house "Atelier Kikala". Mamuka Kikalishvili is represented by the VR Fashion Management.

== Early life ==
Kikalishvili was born on November 15, 1971, in Tbilisi. Since his childhood, which he spent in Tbilisi, he was having fun in his basement lab, developing and printing photos from his first film camera, photography became his favorite hobby. Kikalishvili studied on Faculty of Power Engineering and Telecommunications at Georgian Technical University. He graduated in 2000 and became the Doktor nauk of Engineering Sciences.

== Career ==
Kikalishvili has an invitations from a variety of well-known magazines: Photo Vogue Italia, L'Officiel (Az), Harper's Bazaar (Ru), etc. He filmed such celebrities as Milla Jovovich, Nina Ananiashvili etc. He always dreamt about his own studio. He started readjusted his basement as studio. He went to Germany and purchased his first studio equipment. After visiting Germany, he opened a studio and named it under his nickname – Kikala Studio. He established Kikala Studio, in 2006. One year later it became the most successful studio in Caucasus region. After his first works (Virgin suicide, Les Fleurs Du Mal, Butoh Garden), not only photos were liked by people on the Internet and forums, but the clothes also. Then he came to conclusion, to found fashion house. In September 2012 he founded a fashion house – ”Atelier Kikala”.Creative director in Atelier Kikala is Lado Bokuchava. Kikalishvili has become one of the photographers- contributors in Art+Commerce.

== Personal life ==
Mamuka Kikalishvili is married to Natalia Kikalishvili. They have, three children: daughter Nino Kikalishvili, son Lado Kikalishvili and daughter Kesaria Kikalishvili.
