= Davit Chichveishvili =

Georgian footballer

Personal information
- Date of birth: 23 January 1975 (age 51)
- Place of birth: Tbilisi, Georgia
- Height: 1.88 m (6 ft 2 in)
- Positions: Forward; defender

Youth career
- 1989–1990: FC Dinamo Tbilisi U19

Senior career*
| Years | Team | Apps | (Gls) |
| 1991–1992 | Digomi Tbilisi | 20 | (11) |
| 1992–1995 | Zooveti Tbilisi | 78 | (58) |
| 1995–1996 | FC Dinamo Tbilisi | 1 | (0) |
| 1996–1999 | FC Dinamo Batumi | 55 | (3) |
| 1999 | FC Alania Vladikavkaz | 7 | (0) |
| 1999 | FC Dinamo Tbilisi | 0 | (0) |
| 2000–2003 | FC Lokomotivi Tbilisi | 87 | (8) |
| 2003–2004 | FC Sioni Bolnisi | 33 | (0) |
| 2004–2005 | FC Dinamo Tbilisi | 29 | (0) |
| 2005 | FC Atyrau | 15 | (4) |
| 2005–2006 | FC Sioni Bolnisi | 27 | (2) |
| 2007–2008 | FC Olimpi Rustavi | 14 | (0) |
| 2008–2010 | FK Standard Sumgayit | | |

International career
| 1999 | Georgia | 3 | (0) |

Managerial career
- 2012: Mglebi Zugdidi U19
- * Club domestic league appearances and goals

Davit Chichveishvili (Georgian: დავით ჭიჭვეიშვილი; born 23 January 1975) is a former Georgian professional football player. He has won three Umaglesi League and four Cups.
