= Mamuka Minashvili =

Soviet and Georgian footballer

Personal information
- Date of birth: 3 April 1971 (age 55)
- Place of birth: Tbilisi, Georgian SSR
- Height: 1.76 m (5 ft 9 1/2 in)
- Position: Forward

Youth career
- Avaza Tbilisi

Senior career*
Years	Team	Apps	(Gls)
1988	FC Dinamo Tbilisi	0	(0)
1989–1993	FC Shevardeni-1906 Tbilisi	152	(47)
1993–1994	FC Iveria Khashuri	14	(7)
1994–1998	FC Krylia Sovetov Samara	94	(11)
1999	FC Chkalovets Novosibirsk	6	(0)
2000	FC Dinamo Tbilisi	3	(0)
2000–2001	FC Merani-91 Tbilisi	25	(3)
2001–2002	FC Sioni Bolnisi	28	(3)
2002–2003	FC Shukura Kobuleti		
- * Club domestic league appearances and goals

Mamuka Minashvili (Georgian: მამუკა მინაშვილი; born 3 April 1971) is a former Georgian professional footballer.

== Club career ==
He made his professional debut in the Soviet Second League in 1989 for FC Shevardeni Tbilisi. He played for the main FC Dinamo Tbilisi squad in the USSR Federation Cup.

== Honours ==
- Umaglesi Liga runner-up: 1993.
