= Nikoloz Togonidze =

Soviet and Georgian footballer

Personal information
- Full name: Nikoloz Togonidze
- Date of birth: 24 April 1971 (age 55)
- Place of birth: Soviet Union
- Height: 1.88 m (6 ft 2 in)
- Position: Goalkeeper

Senior career*
Years	Team	Apps	(Gls)
1987–1990	Gorda Rustavi	26	(0)
1991	Dila Gori	4	(0)
1991–1995	Iveria Khashuri	103	(1)
1995–2000	Dinamo Batumi	117	(2)
2000–2001	Torpedo Kutaisi	3	(0)
2001	Tom Tomsk	2	(0)
2001–2002	Torpedo Kutaisi	6	(0)
2002–2003	Prykarpattya Ivano-Frankivsk	2	(0)
2003	Dinamo Batumi	18	(1)

International career
1996–1999	Georgia	11	(0)
- * Club domestic league appearances and goals

Nikoloz Togonidze (Georgian: ნიკოლოზ ტოგონიძე; born 24 April 1971) is a former Soviet and Georgian footballer.

== Career ==
Togonidze began his professional club career at Metallurg Rustavi.

=== International career ===
Togonidze made his international debut for Georgia on 8 May 1996, replacing Irakli Zoidze in 22 minutes. Togonidze became a regular since September 1997, but later compete with Davit Gvaramadze, made his senior team career end at 1999.
