= Davit IV =

Davit IV may refer to:

- Davit IV, Caucasian Albanian Catholicos in 824–852
- David IV of Georgia, the Builder, King in 1089–1125
- David IV, Catholicos-Patriarch of Georgia, ruled in 1447–1457
