= Davit I =

Davit I may refer to:

- Davit I, Caucasian Albanian Catholicos c. 399
- David I of Iberia, Prince in 876–881
- David I of Imereti, King in 1259–1293
