= Davit Mchedlishvili =

Georgian footballer

Personal information
- Full name: Davit Mchedlishvili
- Date of birth: 5 April 1988 (age 38)
- Place of birth: Tbilisi, Soviet Union
- Height: 1.74 m (5 ft 9 in)
- Position: Midfielder

Team information
- Current team: Ameri Tbilisi

Senior career*
Years	Team	Apps	(Gls)
2005	Dinamo Sokhumi	3	(0)
2006–	Ameri Tbilisi	23	(1)

International career^{‡}
2005–	Georgia U21		
2006	Georgia	1	(0)
- * Club domestic league appearances and goals ‡ National team caps and goals as of July 2007

Davit Mchedlishvili (born 5 April 1988 in Tbilisi) is a Georgian footballer who plays for Ameri Tbilisi at Pirveli Liga.

Mchedlishvili made his debut for Georgia on 27 February 2006, against Moldova U21 in Malta Tournament. He also played the game against Malta on 2 March.
