= Davit Lomaia =

Georgian footballer

Personal information
- Full name: Davit Lomaia
- Date of birth: 18 May 1985 (age 41)
- Place of birth: Tbilisi, Georgian SSR
- Height: 1.88 m (6 ft 2 in)
- Position: Defender

Team information
- Current team: Zugdidi
- Number: 3

Senior career*
Years	Team	Apps	(Gls)
2000–2001	Iberia Tbilisi	1	(0)
2001–2006	WIT-2 Georgia	95	(8)
2004–2011	WIT Georgia	170	(7)
2011	Sioni Bolnisi	8	(0)
2011	Metalurgi Rustavi	0	(0)
2011–2012	Spartaki Tskhinvali	14	(0)
2012–2013	Sioni Bolnisi	4	(0)
2013–2014	FC Sasco	3	(0)
2014	Metalurgi Rustavi	2	(0)
2014–	Zugdidi	5	(0)

International career^{‡}
2007	Georgia	1	(0)
- * Club domestic league appearances and goals as of 29 October 2014 ‡ National team caps and goals as of 10 March 2009

Davit Lomaia (Georgian: დავით ლომაია; born 18 May 1985) is a Georgian footballer who plays for Zugdidi.

He is the brother of Giorgi Lomaia.

Lomaia capped for Georgia on 12 September 2007, a friendly match against Azerbaijan. He substituted Aleksandre Kvakhadze in 70 minutes.
