= Davit III =

Davit III may refer to:

- Davit III, Caucasian Albanian Catholicos in 769–778
- David III of Tao, the Great (c. 930s – 1000 or 1001)
- David III, Catholicos-Patriarch of Georgia, ruled in 1435–1439
