= Davit V =

Davit V may refer to:

- Davit V, Caucasian Albanian Catholicos in 923–929
- David V of Georgia, King in 1154–1155
- Catholicos-Patriarch David V of Georgia, ruled in 1972–1977
