= Davit Aslanadze =

Georgian footballer

Personal information
- Date of birth: 16 November 1976 (age 49)
- Place of birth: Kutaisi, Georgian SSR
- Height: 1.94 m (6 ft 4 1/2 in)
- Position: Goalkeeper

Senior career*
Years	Team	Apps	(Gls)
1992–1994	Sulori Vani	25	(0)
1994–1995	FC Mretebi Tbilisi	19	(0)
1995–1996	FC Dinamo-2 Tbilisi	14	(0)
1996–1997	FC Kakheti Telavi	22	(0)
1997–1998	FC Torpedo Kutaisi	28	(0)
1999	FC Samgurali Tskaltubo	10	(0)
1999–2001	FC Lokomotivi Tbilisi	15	(0)
2002–2003	FC Milani Tsnori	6	(0)
2003–2004	FC Ameri Tbilisi	28	(1)
2004–2009	FC Sioni Bolnisi		

International career
1996	Georgia	2	(0)
- * Club domestic league appearances and goals

Davit Aslanadze (Georgian: დავით ასლანაძე; born 16 November 1976) is a retired Georgian professional football player. As of 2010, he has his coaching badges in Georgia.
