= Davit Janelidze =

Georgian footballer

Personal information
- Date of birth: 9 February 1973 (age 53)
- Height: 1.87 m (6 ft 1 1/2 in)
- Position: Goalkeeper

Senior career*
Years	Team	Apps	(Gls)
1990	FC Martve Tbilisi	30	(0)
1991–1994	FC Mretebi Tbilisi	120	(0)
1995	Eintracht Braunschweig	1	(0)
1995–1996	FC Mretebi Tbilisi	12	(0)
1996–1997	FC Dinamo Tbilisi	3	(0)
1997–1998	FC WIT Georgia	14	(0)
1998–2000	FC Alazani Gurjaani	0	(0)
1998–2000	FC Lokomotivi Tbilisi	26	(0)

International career
1992–1993	Georgia	2	(0)
- * Club domestic league appearances and goals

Davit Janelidze (born 9 February 1973) is a Georgian former football player.
