= Irakli Zoidze =

Georgian footballer

Personal information
- Full name: Irakli Zoidze
- Date of birth: 21 March 1969 (age 57)
- Place of birth: Soviet Union
- Height: 1.81 m (5 ft 11 in)
- Position: Goalkeeper

Senior career*
Years	Team	Apps	(Gls)
1990–1991	Mertskhali Ozurgeti	29	(0)
1991–1992	Kutaisi	33	(0)
1992–1998	Dinamo Tbilisi	117	(0)
1998–1999	Maccabi Jaffa	22	(0)
1999	FBK Kaunas	1	(0)
2000–2001	Torpedo Kutaisi	36	(0)
2002–2006	Dinamo Tbilisi	79	(0)

International career
1994–1997, 2001	Georgia	19	(0)
- * Club domestic league appearances and goals

Irakli Zoidze (born 21 March 1969) is a Georgian footballer.

== Football career ==
Zoidze has played for clubs in Georgia, Israel and Lithuania. He often compete with Davit Gvaramadze during his career at Dinamo Tbilisi and Torpedo Kutaisi.

=== International career ===
Zoidze played for Georgia since 8 February 1994. He played once at UEFA Euro 1996 qualifying before lost first choice place to Akaki Devadze. He then played the last two matches in the qualifying after Georgia certainly finished 2nd or below in the 8th round, and have to complete with Germany. He is the regular starter at 1998 FIFA World Cup qualification (UEFA), but the last three games was given to Nikoloz Togonidze. He returned to the national team in 2001, played once in friendly and two in 2002 FIFA World Cup qualification (UEFA).
