= Giorgi Lomaia =

Georgian footballer (born 1979)

Personal information
- Date of birth: 8 August 1979 (age 47)
- Place of birth: Tbilisi, Soviet Union
- Height: 1.93 m (6 ft 4 in)
- Position: Goalkeeper

Senior career*
Years	Team	Apps	(Gls)
1995–1996	Kodako Tbilisi	31	(0)
1996–1997	Dinamo-2 Tbilisi	33	(0)
1997–1998	Dinamo Tbilisi	1	(0)
1998–1999	Merani-91 Tbilisi	22	(0)
1999	Dinamo Tbilisi	1	(0)
2000–2003	Lokomotivi Tbilisi	104	(1)
2003–2004	Spartak Moscow	2	(0)
2004–2005	Khimki	22	(0)
2006	Luch-Energiya Vladivostok	7	(0)
2007	Carl Zeiss Jena	15	(0)
2007	Karpaty Lviv	1	(0)
2008	Olimpi Rustavi	0	(0)
2008–2009	Lokomotivi Tbilisi	27	(0)
2009–2016	Inter Baku	126	(0)
2016–2017	Dinamo Tbilisi	4	(0)
Total		396	(0)

International career
1999–2001	Georgia U21	11	(0)
1998–2010	Georgia	45	(0)
- * Club domestic league appearances and goals

Giorgi Lomaia (Georgian: გიორგი ლომაია; born 8 August 1979) is a Georgian retired professional footballer who played as a goalkeeper. He made his debut for the Georgia national team in 1998 and was capped 45 times.

== Club career ==
Lomaia spent the 2006 season playing for Russian Premier League side Luch-Energia Vladivostok. In late January 2007 he moved to 2. Bundesliga side Carl Zeiss Jena on a short-term deal until the end of the 2006–07 season. He left Jena in June 2007 and joined Karpaty Lviv in Ukraine. Having played two matches in Lviv, Lomaia departed due to the club's dissatisfaction with his physical conditions.

== International career ==
In International football, Lomaia was the first choice goalkeeper in UEFA Euro 2008 qualifying with seven appearances.

In 2006 FIFA World Cup qualification (UEFA), he took the first choice place from Akaki Devadze.

In UEFA Euro 2004 qualifying with eight appearances, he took the first choice place from Davit Gvaramadze.

== Personal life ==
He is the brother of Davit Lomaia.
