= Kakhaber Gogichaishvili =

Georgian footballer (born 1968)

Kakhaber Gogichaishvili კახაბერ 'კახი' გოგიჩაიშვილი
Personal information
- Date of birth: 31 October 1968 (age 57)
- Place of birth: Tbilisi, Soviet Union
- Position: Midfielder

Youth career
- 1986–1987: Shevardeni-1906 Tbilisi

Senior career*
| Years | Team | Apps | (Gls) |
| 1987–1988 | Guria Lanchkhuti | 25 | (2) |
| 1988–1991 | Dinamo Tbilisi | 90 | (14) |
| 1991–1992 | Guria Lanchkhuti | 26 | (3) |
| 1992–1994 | Shevardeni-1906 Tbilisi | 59 | (25) |
| 1994–1995 | Samtredia | 28 | (11) |
| 1995–1997 | Dinamo Tbilisi | 49 | (24) |
| 1998 | Hapoel Ashkelon | 12 | (1) |
| 1998 | Lokomotiv Nizhny Novgorod | 4 | (0) |
| 1998–1999 | Dinamo Tbilisi | 6 | (1) |
| 1999–2002 | Lokomotivi Tbilisi | 71 | (11) |
| 2002–2003 | Merani-Olimpi Tbilisi | 7 | (0) |

International career
| 1992–2000 | Georgia | 27 | (1) |

Managerial career
- 2012–2013: Zestafoni (assistant)
- 2013–2014: Dinamo Tbilisi (youth)
- 2014–2015: Dinamo Tbilisi
- 2015: Guria Lanchkhuti
- 2015–2016: Tskhinvali (youth)
- 2016–2017: Meshakhte Tkibuli
- 2017–2018: FC Mark Stars Tbilisi
- 2019–2021: Zugdidi
- 2022: Gareji
- * Club domestic league appearances and goals

Kakhaber Gogichaishvili (Georgian: კახაბერ 'კახი' გოგიჩაიშვილი; born 31 October 1968) is a Georgian former professional footballer who played as a defender who was capped 27 times for Georgia between 1992 and 2000. He scored one goal, a penalty kick in Georgia's 6–3 win over Azerbaijan in 1992 (Azerbaijan's first international match). At club level, Gogichaishvili played for Tbilisi clubs Shevardeni-1906, Dinamo, Lokomotivi and Merani-Olimpi Tbilisi.

== Coaching career ==
After retiring Gogichaishvili began coaching. During 2013–14 season, he was the head coach of Dinamo Tbilisi's reserve team. In 2014, together with him, Dinamo's youth team won prestigious youth tournament Ruhr Cup, defeated Galatasaray in the final, after eliminating Borussia Mönchengladbach in the semi-final. Shortly after this success, Gogichaishvili replaced Michal Bilek and became Dinamo's first team head coach.

In 2019, Gogichaishvili was appointed manager of FC Zugdidi. After three years spent there in early 2022 he took charge of Gareji. He left the club after a five-game winless run in April.

== Career statistics ==
| # | Date | Venue | Opponent | Score | Result | Competition |
|---|---|---|---|---|---|---|
| 1. | 17 September 1992 | David Kipiani Stadium, Gurjaani | Azerbaijan | 5–2 | 6–3 | Friendly |
