= Temur Ketsbaia =

Georgian football player and coach

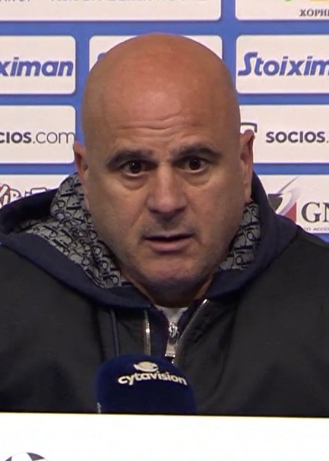
- Ketsbaia in 2022

Personal information
- Date of birth: 18 March 1968 (age 58)
- Place of birth: Gali, Georgian SSR
- Height: 1.76 m (5 ft 9 1/2 in)
- Positions: Midfielder; winger

Team information
- Current team: Dinamo Tbilisi (manager)

Youth career
- –1980: Dinamo Sokhumi
- 1980–1985: Sportinternat Tbilisi

Senior career*
Years	Team	Apps	(Gls)
1986–1987	Dinamo Sokhumi	22	(5)
1987–1992	Dinamo Tbilisi	104	(23)
1992–1994	Anorthosis Famagusta	76	(36)
1994–1997	AEK Athens	84	(24)
1997–2000	Newcastle United	78	(8)
2000–2001	Wolverhampton Wanderers	24	(3)
2001–2002	Dundee	22	(6)
2002–2007	Anorthosis Famagusta	100	(39)
Total		510	(144)

International career
1990–2003	Georgia	52	(17)

Managerial career
- 2004–2009: Anorthosis Famagusta
- 2009: Olympiacos
- 2009–2014: Georgia
- 2015–2016: APOEL
- 2016: AEK Athens
- 2017: Orenburg
- 2019–2022: Anorthosis Famagusta
- 2022–2024: Cyprus
- 2025–2026: Anorthosis Famagusta
- 2026–: Dinamo Tbilisi
- * Club domestic league appearances and goals

Temur Ketsbaia (Georgian: თემურ ქეცბაია; born 18 March 1968) is a Georgian professional football manager and former player. He is currently manager of Dinamo Tbilisi.

== Club career ==
Ketsbaia began his professional career in 1986 with Georgian clubs Dinamo Sokhumi and Dinamo Tbilisi. In 1992 he moved to Cyprus to play for Anorthosis Famagusta, displaying impressive performance. On 1 June 1994, was transferred to the Greek champions, AEK Athens for a fee of 100 million drachmas.

In his first official match against Rangers, for the UEFA Champions League qualifiers, he seriously injured his hand. He returned after a few months, but his performance in his first season was not as expected, affected by both the injury and his adaptation to a more demanding league. He was the only scorer in the league derby against Olympiacos in AEK's away victory on 19 November 1994. The following season, Ketsbaia won the Cup with AEK and was named by his colleagues in the league as the best foreign footballer of the season. On 28 September 1995, he scored against Sion for the UEFA Cup Winners' Cup. In the semi-finals, he scored in both legs against Panathinaikos. His next season, he helped AEK win the Greek Super Cup. On 17 October 1996, he opened the score in AEK's 2–0 win against Olimpija Ljubljana for round 16 of the UEFA Winners' Cup.

On 7 July 1997 Ketsbaia moved to England to play for Newcastle United on a free transfer. Early in his Newcastle career, he scored a goal in extra time against Dinamo Zagreb, ensuring a place for Newcastle in the UEFA Champions League for the first time in their history. However, his time in England is mostly remembered for his celebration after scoring a last-minute winner against Bolton Wanderers in 1998, in which he took off his shirt and kicked the advertising hoardings; he stated that this was to relieve his frustration at being kept out of Newcastle's starting line-up. Although he was considered something of a cult hero by Newcastle fans, he was sold to Wolverhampton Wanderers in 2000. He played for Dundee from 2001 to 2002, then returned to Anorthosis until announcing his retirement on 30 June 2007. He played his final match on 14 July.

In May 2015, Ketsbaia played for Dundee once more against Crystal Palace as part of Julián Speroni's testimonial match, joining former Dundee players Georgi Nemsadze, Juan Sara, Fabián Caballero, and Luis Alberto Carranza.

== International career ==
He won the Malta International Football Tournament whilst on international duty with Georgia in 1998, the only International honour in his career.

== Managerial career ==
=== Anorthosis (first spell) ===
In January 2004, while still a player for Anorthosis, Ketsbaia took his first managerial position there. He won two championships as the manager of Anorthosis, in 2004–05 and in 2007–08, and one cup in 2006–07. In 2005 Anorthosis reached in the third-round of the Champions League, over running Trabzonspor in the second round, and in 2008–09 reached in the UEFA Champions League Group Stage, the first Cypriot team to do so.

On 28 September 2008, he stated his interest for the vacant Newcastle manager position. In an interview with the Sunday Mirror, he said: "I had a great opportunity to play at Newcastle as a player, so why not as a manager?"

In the week before the match club directors had gone to the police complaining of financial irregularities being carried out by the club president who was forced to resign, despite support from Ketsbaia and club supporters.

In April 2009, Ketsbaia stood down as coach of Anorthosis.

=== Olympiacos ===
On 25 May 2009, the chairman of Olympiacos announced that Ketsbaia had been appointed the club's manager on a three-year deal, replacing Ernesto Valverde; however, on 15 September 2009, Ketsbaia and Olympiacos parted company following early criticism from the club's supporters, despite Olympiakos not conceding a goal during his tenure.

=== Georgia national team ===
In November 2009 he was announced as manager of the Georgian national side, which he represented 49 times as a player. He claimed that while he could not promise a major tournament in the near future, the team would fight to reach one.

In January 2015, Ketsbaia once again declared his interest in taking over the vacant manager job at Newcastle United, after Alan Pardew moved on to Crystal Palace, however, John Carver was appointed in a temporary position instead.

=== APOEL ===
On 28 August 2015, Ketsbaia agreed terms with reigning Cypriot champions APOEL, signing a two-year contract with the club and replacing Domingos Paciência who was fired earlier at the same day. On 21 April 2016, one day after APOEL's elimination in the Cypriot Cup semi-finals by Apollon Limassol, Ketsbaia's contract with APOEL was terminated, although at that moment the team were four points clear at the top of the league with only four matches remaining.

=== AEK Athens ===
On 6 June 2016, Ketsbaia took over the management at Greek powerhouse AEK Athens, a club he played for until 1996, on a two-year contract. His overall defensive managing mentality prevented the club from playing exciting football. On 19 October 2016, two weeks after a heavy away 3-0 defeat to Olympiacos, the AEK board decided to terminate Ketsbaia's contract with immediate effect, something that Ketsbaia attributed to a premeditated sacking plan by the board, which amongst others involved slanderous press publications targeting Ketsbaia. The Georgian manager, apparently disturbed by the 'unlawful behaviour' of the club's administration in the employment termination process, filed a lawsuit on 10 December 2016 demanding a sum of approximately £350k to be shared among him and his backroom staff; Ketsbaia was eventually entitled to a sum of just under £100k plus legal taxes following the examination of the case. In an interview for the Cypriot branch of Alpha TV, Ketsbaia accused the Greek sport journalism sector of deliberately misrepresenting true facts in favour of certain teams and board members, and AEK of underestimating his managerial abilities for no apparent reason; he even added that certain AEK board members were hoping for a loss against Larisa in order to justify his imminent sacking.

=== FC Orenburg ===
On 1 June 2017, he was hired as the manager of the Russian club FC Orenburg. On 17 August 2017, the president of FC Orenburg, Vasily Stolypin, said that Temuri Ketsbaia left the post of head coach not because of sports results. He left the mutual consent of the parties and personal affairs, the family.

=== Anorthosis (second spell) ===
On 1 June 2019, he returned to Anorthosis and "A. Papadopoulos". He was the coach of the Famagusta team for the second time, finishing in the 2nd place of the championship in the 2019-20 season, which was stopped prematurely due to the coronavirus, equaling with the 1st Omonia, which the team would have faced in the semifinals of the cup. In the 2020-21 season he finished in 4th place and won the cup. In the period 2021-22, Anorthosis finished in 5th place and was excluded from the institution of the cup in the semifinal phase by Omonia.

Participated in the Europa League qualifiers in 2020-21 and 2021-22. In 2021-22 he also qualified for the Europa Conference groups. He finished in 3rd place in the group behind Gent and Partizan and in front of Flora.

On 6 June 2022, he was announced by the management of Anorthosis that he is a past member of the team. The reason was his insistence on keeping his associates on the bench, disagreeing with the terms set by the athletic director and management.

=== Cyprus national team ===
On 29 June 2022, Ketsbaia took over the management of the Cyprus national team. After a promising 1-0 debut win against Greece in the group stages of the 22/23 Nations League, his management led Cyprus to a disappointing record of 4 wins, 13 losses, and 2 draws (with a 19-49 goal ratio) in both friendly and official games, with Cyprus coming last in their group in both the 22/23 Nations League and the 22/23 Euro Qualifiers. Following Cyprus' home defeat by Kosovo 4-0 in the UEFA Nations League, Ketsbaia was released by the team on 14 September 2024.

=== Anorthosis (third spell) ===
On 5 September 2025, Ketsbaia returned to Anorthosis as a manager for the third time, having signed a three-year duration contract.

== Career statistics ==
=== International goals ===
Georgia score listed first, score column indicates score after each Ketsbaia goal.

International goals by date, venue, opponent, score, result and competition
No.	Date	Venue	Cap	Opponent	Score	Result	Competition
1	2 July 1991	Stadionul Republican, Chișinău, Moldova	2	Moldova	1–0	4–2	Friendly
2	10 February 1994	National Stadium, Ta' Qali, Malta	5	Malta	1–0	1–0	1994 Rothmans International Tournament
3	16 November 1994	Boris Paichadze National Stadium, Tbilisi, Georgia	7	Wales	1–0	5–0	UEFA Euro 1996 qualifying
4	16 November 1994	Boris Paichadze National Stadium, Tbilisi, Georgia	7	Wales	3–0	5–0	UEFA Euro 1996 qualifying
5	26 April 1995	Boris Paichadze National Stadium, Tbilisi, Georgia	9	Albania	2–0	2–0	UEFA Euro 1996 qualifying
6	6 September 1995	Frankenstadion, Nuremberg, Germany	11	Germany	1–0	1–4	UEFA Euro 1996 qualifying
7	27 March 1996	Tsirion Athletic Centre, Limassol, Cyprus	13	Cyprus	1–0	2–0	Friendly
8	24 September 1997	Stadionul Republican, Chișinău, Moldova	24	Moldova	1–0	1–0	1998 FIFA World Cup qualification
9	11 October 1997	Boris Paichadze National Stadium, Tbilisi, Georgia	25	Poland	3–0	3–0	1998 FIFA World Cup qualification
10	8 February 1998	National Stadium, Ta' Qali, Malta	27	Albania	1–0	3–0	1998 Rothmans International Tournament
11	5 June 1999	Boris Paichadze National Stadium, Tbilisi, Georgia	36	Greece	1–0	1–2	UEFA Euro 2000 qualifying
12	2 February 2000	Antonis Papadopoulos Stadium, Larnaca, Cyprus	37	Slovakia	1–0	2–0	2008 Cyprus Four Nations Football Tournament
13	4 February 2000	Antonis Papadopoulos Stadium, Larnaca, Cyprus	38	Romania	1–0	1–1	2008 Cyprus Four Nations Football Tournament
14	7 October 2000	Steponas Darius ir Stasys Girėnas Stadionas, Kaunas, Lithuania	43	Lithuania	1–0	4–0	2002 FIFA World Cup qualification
15	7 October 2000	Steponas Darius ir Stasys Girėnas Stadionas, Kaunas, Lithuania	43	Lithuania	2–0	4–0	2002 FIFA World Cup qualification
16	24 April 2001	Boris Paichadze National Stadium, Tbilisi, Georgia	47	Israel	1–0	3–2	Friendly
17	24 April 2001	Boris Paichadze National Stadium, Tbilisi, Georgia	47	Israel	2–1	3–2	Friendly

== Managerial statistics ==
As of 9 September 2024

Managerial record by team and tenure
Team	From	To	Record								Ref
Team	From	To	P	W	D	L	GF	GA	GD	Win %	Ref
Anorthosis	July 2004	13 April 2009	203	119	55	29	241	127	+114	58.62	
Olympiacos	25 May 2009	15 September 2009	6	5	1	0	9	0	+9	83.33	
Georgia	6 November 2009	14 November 2014	40	13	9	18	32	43	−11	32.50	
APOEL	30 August 2015	21 April 2016	43	27	7	9	93	40	+53	62.79	
AEK Athens	6 June 2016	18 October 2016	7	3	2	2	8	6	+2	42.86	
Orenburg	1 June 2017	15 August 2017	8	3	1	4	7	11	−4	37.50	
Anorthosis	1 June 2019	15 June 2022	119	56	31	32	179	130	+49	47.06	
Cyprus	29 June 2022	14 September 2024	20	5	2	13	19	49	−30	25.00	
Anorthosis	5 September 2025	2 February 2026	20	5	7	8	17	32	−15	25.00	
Dinamo Tbilisi	24 April 2026	Present	25	13	6	6	45	40	+5	52.00	
Total			491	249	123	119	640	478	+162	50.71	—

== Honours ==
=== As a player ===
Dinamo Tbilisi

- Umaglesi Liga: 1990, 1991

AEK Athens

- Greek Cup: 1995–96, 1996–97
- Greek Super Cup: 1996

Newcastle United

- FA Cup runner-up: 1997–98, 1998–99

Anorthosis

- Cypriot First Division: 2004–05
- Cypriot Cup: 2002–03

Individual

- Georgian Footballer of the Year: 1990, 1997
- Best Foreign Player (Greece): 1995–96

=== As a manager ===
Anorthosis

- Cypriot First Division: 2004–05, 2007–08
- Cypriot Cup: 2006–07, 2020–21
- Cypriot Super Cup: 2007
