= Gia Jishkariani =

Soviet and Georgian footballer

Personal information
- Full name: Gia Jishkariani
- Date of birth: 30 November 1967 (age 58)
- Place of birth: Tbilisi, Soviet Union
- Height: 1.77 m (5 ft 10 in)
- Position: Midfielder

Youth career
- –1985: DYuSSh-35 Tbilisi
- 1985–1987: Mertskhali Makharadze

Senior career*
Years	Team	Apps	(Gls)
1987	Guria Lanchkhuti	11	(1)
1988–1992	Dinamo Tbilisi	97	(14)
1992	GKS Katowice	7	(0)
1992–1994	Shevardeni-1906 Tbilisi	57	(20)
1994–1995	Samtredia	27	(18)

International career
1988–1989	Soviet Union U21		
1991–1994	Georgia	9	(1)
- * Club domestic league appearances and goals

Gia Jishkariani (Georgian: გია ჯიშკარიანი; born 30 November 1967) is a Soviet-Georgian former professional footballer who played as a midfielder. He is the father of Nikoloz Jishkariani, also a footballer.

Jishkariani started his career for Guria Lanchkhuti in Soviet Top League. He then moved to Dinamo Tbilisi and played the first ever Umaglesi Liga in 1990.

== International goals ==
#	Date	Venue	Opponent	Score	Result	Competition
1.	17 September 1992	David Kipiani Stadium, Gurjaani	Azerbaijan	6–2	6–3	Friendly

== Honours ==
Iberia (Dinamo) Tbilisi

- Umaglesi Liga: 1990, 1991, 1991–92
- Georgian Cup: 1991–92
