= Archil Arveladze =

Georgian footballer (born 1973)

Personal information
- Date of birth: 22 February 1973 (age 53)
- Place of birth: Tbilisi, Georgia
- Height: 1.78 m (5 ft 10 in)
- Position: Striker

Youth career
- Iberia Tbilisi

Senior career*
Years	Team	Apps	(Gls)
1991–1993	Dinamo Tbilisi	57	(35)
1993–1997	Trabzonspor	46	(17)
1997–2000	NAC Breda	89	(32)
2000–2003	1. FC Köln	29	(7)
2003–2004	Dinamo Tbilisi	0	(0)
2004–2005	Locomotive Tbilisi	0	(0)
Total		221	(91)

International career
1994–2002	Georgia	32	(6)
- * Club domestic league appearances and goals

Archil Arveladze (Georgian: არჩილ არველაძე; born 22 February 1973) is a Georgian former professional footballer who played as a striker for various sides in Europe.

== Club career ==
Born in Tbilisi, Arveladze spent his youth career with local team Iberia Tbilisi. The striker began his senior career at Georgian champion team, Dinamo Tbilisi. Playing abroad in Turkey, the Netherlands and Germany, he returned to Georgia in 2003.

== International career ==
Arveladze earned 32 caps for the Georgia national team, scoring six goals.

== Personal life ==
Archil's brother Revaz and his twin brother Shota are also former professional footballers. The brothers established a foundation to support Georgian football. Revaz's youngest son Vato is a professional footballer.

On 21 July 2021, it was announced that Arveladze would possibly be a candidate for Tbilisi mayor with the For Georgia party in the 2021 Georgian local elections.

== Honours ==
Trabzonspor

- Turkish Super Cup: 1995
