= Nikoloz Chkheidze =

Soviet and Georgian footballer

Personal information
- Full name: Nikoloz Chkheidze
- Date of birth: 29 November 1968 (age 57)
- Place of birth: Sachkhere, Georgian SSR, Soviet Union
- Position: Goalkeeper

Senior career*
Years	Team	Apps	(Gls)
1987–1990	FC Torpedo Kutaisi	78	(0)
1991–1995	Iberia/Dinamo Tbilisi	96	(0)
1995–1998	FC 08 Homburg	24	(0)
1999–2000	FC Dinamo Tbilisi	2	(0)

International career
1991	Georgia	1	(0)
- * Club domestic league appearances and goals

Nikoloz "Nika" Chkheidze (Georgian: ნიკოლოზ "ნიკა" ჩეხიძე; born 29 November 1968) is a former Soviet and Georgian footballer who played as goalkeeper. Chkheidze played only once for Georgia in a friendly match against Moldova in 1991.

He had a three-seasons spell with FC 08 Homburg after the club was relegated from 2. Bundesliga to Regionalliga West/Südwest. He left Homburg after a financial crisis that led the team to bankruptcy and denial of license even to play at Oberliga Südwest, the 4th national level.

== Honours ==
- Georgian League: 5

1991, 1992, 1993, 1994, 1995

- Georgian Cup: 4

1992, 1993, 1994, 1995
