= Davit Kizilashvili =

Soviet and Georgian footballer

Personal information
- Date of birth: 20 January 1971 (age 55)
- Place of birth: Zemo Alvani, Georgian SSR
- Height: 1.86 m (6 ft 1 in)
- Position: Striker

Senior career*
Years	Team	Apps	(Gls)
1988–1990	FC Dinamo Tbilisi	16	(3)
1991–1992	Odishi Zugdidi	40	(22)
1992–1993	FC Shevardeni-1906 Tbilisi	28	(14)
1993–1995	AC Omonia	35	(15)
1995–1997	FC Dinamo Tbilisi	22	(7)
1997–1998	Hapoel Ashkelon F.C.	22	(1)

International career
1992–1995	Georgia	8	(2)
- * Club domestic league appearances and goals

Davit Kizilashvili (born 20 January 1971 in Zemo Alvani) is a Georgian former professional footballer.

== International goals ==
#	Date	Venue	Opponent	Score	Result	Competition
1.	17 September 1992	David Kipiani Stadium, Gurjaani	Azerbaijan	1–0	6–3	Friendly
2.	17 September 1992	David Kipiani Stadium, Gurjaani	Azerbaijan	2–1	6–3	Friendly
