= Mamuka Machavariani =

Georgian footballer

Personal information
- Date of birth: 27 November 1970 (age 55)
- Height: 1.80 m (5 ft 11 in)
- Position: Defender

Senior career*
Years	Team	Apps	(Gls)
1988–1991	FC Dinamo Tbilisi	33	(0)
1991–1992	FC Margveti Zestaponi	35	(0)
1992–1993	FC Shevardeni-1906 Tbilisi	31	(2)
1993–1994	FC Kolkheti-1913 Poti	31	(2)
1995–1999	FC Dinamo Tbilisi	68	(3)
1999–2000	Tbilisi	13	(0)

International career
1995–1997	Georgia	3	(0)
- * Club domestic league appearances and goals

Mamuka Machavariani (Georgian: მამუკა მაჭავარიანი, born 27 November 1970) is a retired Georgian professional football player.
