= Gocha Chikovani =

Georgian footballer

Personal information
- Date of birth: 12 October 1962 (age 64)
- Height: 1.80 m (5 ft 11 in)
- Position: Defender

Senior career*
Years	Team	Apps	(Gls)
1981–1982	FC Dinamo Batumi		
1982–1984	FC Dinamo Tbilisi	8	(0)
1985–1989	FC Dinamo Batumi	168	(3)
1989–1994	FC Dinamo Tbilisi	148	(3)
1995–1996	FC Dinamo Batumi	23	(0)
1998–1999	FC Arsenali Tbilisi	13	(0)

International career
1992	Georgia	1	(0)
- * Club domestic league appearances and goals

Gocha Chikovani (Georgian: გოჩა ჩიქოვანი; born 12 October 1962) is a retired Georgian professional football player.
