= Kakhaber Kacharava =

Georgian footballer (born 1966)

Personal information
- Date of birth: 19 November 1966 (age 59)
- Place of birth: Senaki, Georgian SSR
- Height: 1.84 m (6 ft 0 in)
- Position: Striker

Senior career*
Years	Team	Apps	(Gls)
1985	Samegrelo Chkhorotsku		
1986–1987	Lokomotiv Samtredia	47	(7)
1988	Torpedo Kutaisi	29	(15)
1989–1992	Dinamo Tbilisi	96	(54)
1992–1994	Olympiakos Nicosia	45	(20)
1994	Trabzonspor	7	(2)
1995	Dinamo Tbilisi	1	(0)
1995–1996	Tennis Borussia Berlin	19	(7)
1996–1998	08 Homburg	61	(19)
1998–2000	Waldhof Mannheim	5	(1)
2000–2001	Iberia Samtredia	2	(0)

International career
1990–1994	Georgia	3	(2)

Managerial career
- 2006: Dinamo Tbilisi
- 2009–2011: Dinamo Tbilisi
- 2012: Georgia U-19
- 2013: Zestaponi
- 2013–2016: Tskhinvali
- 2017–2018: Dinamo Tbilisi
- 2019–2020: Samtredia
- 2026: Odishi 1919
- * Club domestic league appearances and goals

Kakhaber Kacharava (Georgian: კახა კაჭარავა; born 19 November 1966) is a Georgian football coach and a former player, who most recently was in charge of Erovnuli Liga 2 side Odishi 1919.

== Career ==
Kakha Kacharava has had the record-breaking three spells as manager of Dinamo Tbilisi. He was the first coach appointed since Roman Pipia's arrival at the club in 2010.

In January 2012, he was appointed as a U19 manager for one year. His team performed well enough to qualify for the elite round of 2013 European Championship, although Kacharava quit to join Zestaponi next January. His stint coincided with an overall decline that this club was experiencing after winning two consecutive league titles.

In October 2013, Kacharava took charge of Spartaki Tskhinvali, later renamed as Tskhinvali. During his three year-long tenure, he guided the team to the highest place in its history and Europa League.

Kacharava returned to Dinamo Tbilisi in early 2017 and spent almost two full seasons there. When it became clear that Dinamo would fail to win the league in 2018, the sides parted ways with four games to spare.

The next year he took over Liga 2 side Samtredia, who had suffered relegation in the previous season. Under his management the team succeeded in promotion bid and secured an immediate return to the top tier. He stepped down in September 2020.

On 27 April 2026, Kacharava was appointed as head coach of the 2nd division club Odishi 1919. He left the job four months later.

== Personal life ==
His son Nika Kacharava is a footballer who used to play for the Georgia national team.

== Honours ==
=== Player ===
Dinamo Tbilisi

- Umaglesi Liga: 1990, 1991, 1991–92

=== Manager ===
Dinamo Tbilisi

- Umaglesi Liga runner-up: 2008–09, 2009–10, 2010–11, 2017
- Georgian Cup: 2008–09; runner-up 2009–10
- Georgian Super Cup runner-up: 2009

Zestaponi

- Georgian Super Cup: 2012

Samtredia

- Erovnuli Liga 2 runner-up: 2019
