= Kakhaber Tskhadadze =

Georgian footballer (born 1968)

Personal information
- Date of birth: 7 September 1968 (age 58)
- Place of birth: Rustavi, Georgian SSR, Soviet Union
- Height: 1.87 m (6 ft 2 in)
- Position: Defender

Youth career
- Metalurg Rustavi

Senior career*
Years	Team	Apps	(Gls)
1986–1987	Metalurg Rustavi	39	(0)
1988–1991	Dinamo Tbilisi	85	(3)
1991	GIF Sundsvall	11	(0)
1992	Spartak Moscow	7	(0)
1992	Dynamo Moscow	12	(0)
1992–1996	Eintracht Frankfurt	73	(2)
1997	Alania Vladikavkaz	17	(1)
1998–2000	Manchester City	12	(2)
2000–2002	Lokomotivi Tbilisi	0	(0)
2003–2004	Anzhi Makhachkala	41	(0)
Total		321	(8)

International career
1990	Soviet Union U21	5	(0)
1992	CIS	6	(1)
1992–1998	Georgia	25	(1)

Managerial career
- 2001–2002: Lokomotivi Tbilisi
- 2005–2006: Dinamo Tbilisi
- 2006–2007: Sioni Bolnisi
- 2008: Standard Baku
- 2009: Georgia U21
- 2009–2015: Inter Baku
- 2015–2016: Georgia
- 2016–2017: Kairat
- 2018–2020: Ordabasy
- 2021–2022: Dinamo Tbilisi
- 2022–2023: Caspiy
- 2024–2026: Gabala
- * Club domestic league appearances and goals

Kakhaber Tskhadadze (Georgian: კახაბერ ცხადაძე; born 7 September 1968) is a Georgian football manager and former player.

As a player he was defender who notably played in the Bundesliga for Eintracht Frankfurt, in the Premier League for Manchester City and in the Russian Premier League for Spartak Moscow, Dynamo Moscow, Alania Vladikavkaz and Anzhi Makhachkala. He has also played for Metalurg Rustavi, Lokomotivi Tbilisi, Dinamo Tbilisi and GIF Sundsvall. He was capped 6 times by Soviet Union and 25 times for Georgia.

Moving into management in 2001 he was initially player/manager of Lokomotivi Tbilisi, before returning to Dinamo Tbilisi in 2005. He has since gone on to manage Sioni Bolnisi, Standard Baku, Georgia U21, Inter Baku, Georgia, Kairat and Ordabasy, before returning once more to Dinamo in 2021.

== Club career ==
Tskhadadze's club career started in 1986 in Dinamo Tbilisi. He became known in Western Europe with German team Eintracht Frankfurt, who he joined in 1992. After a couple of successful seasons, he gradually found himself struggling for a first team place, and in 1997 he joined Alania Vladikavkaz. After a short time, he was bought by English team Manchester City, where he teamed up with fellow Georgians Murtaz Shelia (a former teammate) and Georgi Kinkladze. Tskhadadze's time at the Manchester club was fraught with injury, forcing the team to buy other central defenders such as Andy Morrison. In March 2000, he was released from the club. He then played for Lokomotiv Tbilisi and Anzhi Makhachkala, until he retired and was appointed head coach for Dinamo Tbilisi.

== International career ==
In 1990, Tskhadadze played five matches for the Soviet Union national under-21 team, who won the 1990 UEFA European Under-21 Championship tournament. In 1992, he earned six caps and scored one goal for CIS, including one appearance at Euro 92. He later became a part of the recently formed Georgia national team, and played 25 matches in total, captaining the side. His only goal for Georgia came in a 1997 World Cup qualifier against Poland, and his last match was played on 30 May 1998 against Russia.

== Managerial career ==
In March 2005, Tskhadadze was appointed as Head coach of Dinamo Tbilisi and won the Georgian Championship and Super Cup in the same year.

In January 2006, he became the manager of Sioni Bolnisi and won the first ever Championship trophy for the club.

In 2009, Tskhadadze started coaching Inter Baku and won the Azerbaijan Premier League title in his first year at the club, following up with winning the CIS Cup in 2011.

In December 2014, he was appointed as the new coach of Georgia.

On 7 April 2016, Tskhadadze was appointed as manager of Kairat. He managed to win the Kazakhstan Super Cup and led the team to the Kazakhstan cup final, but resigned just before the team won the trophy. Tskhadadze resigned as manager of Kairat on 21 July 2017 following their elimination from the Europa League.

His second spell at Dinamo Tbilisi began in May 2021, which lasted one year.

On 13 November 2022, Tskhadadze was appointed as manager of Caspiy.

On 25 February 2024, Tskhadadze was appointed as the new Head Coach of Gabala, on a contract until the summer of 2025. On 27 May 2024, at the end of the 2023-24 season, Gabala extended their contract with Tskhadadze until the summer of 2027. On 31 August 2026, his contract with the club was terminated by mutual consent.

== Personal life ==
Tskhadadze is the father of former Georgian national team player Bachana Tskhadadze.

== Managerial statistics ==
As of 31 August 2026

Team	From	To	Record							
Team	From	To	G	W	D	L	Win %	GF	GA	+/–
Georgia U21	1 January 2009	30 June 2009	4	1	1	2	25%	2	3	–1
Inter Baku	1 July 2009	30 June 2015	182	91	48	43	50%	255	158	+97
Georgia	1 January 2015	1 February 2016	10	3	1	6	30%	11	16	–5
Kairat Almaty	7 April 2016	21 July 2017	57	38	13	6	66.67%	133	50	+83
Ordabasy	15 June 2018	31 December 2020	77	37	20	20	48.05%	106	75	+31
Dinamo Tbilisi	27 May 2021	18 June 2022	41	20	10	11	50%	67	42	+25
Caspiy	13 November 2022	11 April 2023	5	0	0	5	0%	4	14	–9
Qabala	25 February 2024	31 August 2026	56	13	10	33	23%	63	85	–22
Career total			369	187	93	90	51.51%	563	343	+220

== Honours ==
=== Player ===
Dinamo Tbilisi

- Georgian Premier League: 1990, 1991

Spartak Moscow

- Russian Football Premier League: 1992
- Soviet Cup: 1991–92

Manchester City

- Football League Second Division playoff winner

Soviet Union U21

- 1990 UEFA European Under-21 Championship Gold medal

=== Manager ===
Dinamo Tbilisi

- Georgian Super Cup: 2005
- Erovnuli Liga: 2004–2005

Sioni Bolnisi

- Erovnuli Liga: 2005–2006

Inter Baku

- Azerbaijan Premier League: 2009–10
- Commonwealth of Independent States Cup: 2011

Kairat

- Kazakhstan Super Cup: 2017

Gabala

- Azerbaijan First League: 2024–25
