= Revaz Arveladze =

Georgian footballer (born 1969)

Personal information
- Date of birth: 15 September 1969 (age 57)
- Place of birth: Tbilisi, Soviet Union
- Height: 1.80 m (5 ft 11 in)
- Position: Attacking midfielder

Senior career*
Years	Team	Apps	(Gls)
1988	Metallurg Rustavi	6	(0)
1988	Locomotive Tbilisi	12	(1)
1989–1994	Dinamo Tbilisi	76	(25)
1990	→ Martve Tbilisi (loan)	25	(18)
1994	→ 1. FC Köln (loan)	7	(1)
1995	Tennis Borussia Berlin	4	(0)
1995–1996	FC Homburg	24	(11)
1996–1997	KV Mechelen	25	(4)
1997–1998	FC Homburg	21	(8)
1999	Rot-Weiß Oberhausen	2	(0)
2000	Dinamo Tbilisi	8	(4)
Total		210	(72)

International career
1992–2000	Georgia	11	(0)

Managerial career
- 2000–2001: Dinamo Tbilisi
- 2003: Georgia U21
- 2003: Lokomotivi Tbilisi
- * Club domestic league appearances and goals

Revaz Arveladze (Georgian: რევაზ არველაძე; born 15 September 1969) is a Georgian former professional footballer who played as a midfielder for various sides in Georgia, Germany and Belgium.

== Club career ==
Born in Tbilisi, Arveladze began his senior career with Georgian club Dinamo Tbilisi. He then played abroad in Germany and Belgium, before returning to Georgia in 1998.

== International career ==
Arveladze won 11 caps for the Georgia national team.

== Post-playing career ==
Arveladze works as the Secretary General of the Football Federation of Georgia.

== Personal life ==
He is the elder brother of fellow Georgian internationals Archil and Shota Arveladze. His youngest son, Vato is a professional footballer.

== Career statistics ==
Appearances and goals by national team and year
National team	Year	Apps	Goals
Georgia	1992	2	0
Georgia	1994	3	0
Georgia	1995	1	0
Georgia	1996	3	0
Georgia	2000	2	0
Total		11	0
