= Malkhaz Arziani =

Georgian footballer

Personal information
- Full name: Malkhaz Arziani
- Date of birth: 15 August 1964
- Place of birth: Poti, Soviet Union
- Date of death: 22 June 2022 (aged 57)
- Height: 1.75 m (5 ft 9 in)
- Position: Defender

Senior career*
Years	Team	Apps	(Gls)
1982	Dinamo Tbilisi	5	(0)
198	Kolkheti-1913 Poti		
1984–1986	Dinamo Tbilisi	62	(1)
1987	Dinamo Batumi	2	(0)
1987	Guria Lanchkhuti	15	(0)
1987–1993	Dinamo Tbilisi	109	(1)
1993–1995	Gällivare SK		
1995–1996	FC Kolkheti-1913 Poti	8	(1)
1997	Gorda Rustavi	3	(0)
1998	Gällivare SK		

International career
1992	Georgia	1	(0)
- * Club domestic league appearances and goals

Malkhaz Arziani (15 August 1964 – 22 June 2022) was a Georgian footballer. He is the father of Zurab Arziani.

Malkhaz Arziani spent eight seasons in the Soviet Top League as a leftback between 1982 and 1990, followed by four successive seasons in Umaglesi Liga at Dinamo Tbilisi.

He played his only cap for Georgia against Azerbaijan in September 1992. But at that time Azerbaijan was not a member of FIFA nor UEFA, so the match does not regard as official match.
