= Gela Inalishvili =

Soviet and Georgian footballer

Personal information
- Date of birth: 3 October 1966 (age 60)
- Place of birth: Soviet Union
- Height: 1.71 m (5 ft 7 in)
- Position: Midfielder

Senior career*
Years	Team	Apps	(Gls)
1984–1989	Dinamo Sokhumi	156	(12)
1990	Tskhumi Sokhumi	27	(7)
1991–1997	Dinamo Tbilisi	125	(51)
1997	Krylia Sovetov Samara	9	(0)
1997–1998	Kolkheti-1913 Poti	8	(2)

International career
1994–1996	Georgia	10	(0)
- * Club domestic league appearances and goals

Gela Inalishvili (born 3 October 1966) is a Soviet and Georgian former footballer who played as a midfielder.

== International career ==
Inalishvili made his Georgia debut on 11 June 1994, a friendly match. He played two more friendly and six time in UEFA Euro 1996 qualifying. His last cap was 1998 FIFA World Cup qualification (UEFA) against Italy.
