= Georgi Nemsadze =

Georgian footballer (1972–2026)

Personal information
- Date of birth: 10 May 1972
- Place of birth: Tbilisi, Georgian SSR, Soviet Union
- Date of death: 21 October 2026 (aged 54)
- Place of death: Tbilisi, Georgia
- Height: 1.80 m (5 ft 11 in)
- Position: Midfielder

Senior career*
Years	Team	Apps	(Gls)
1989–1995	Dinamo Tbilisi	79	(16)
1991–1992	→ Guria Lanchkhuti (loan)	34	(4)
1992–1993	→ Shevardeni Tbilisi (loan)	32	(9)
1995–1996	FC Homburg	30	(2)
1996–1997	Trabzonspor	32	(1)
1997–1998	Grasshoppers	27	(2)
1999	Reggiana	10	(0)
1999	Locomotive Tbilisi	3	(0)
2000	Dinamo Tbilisi	6	(2)
2000–2003	Dundee	79	(4)
2004–2005	Dinamo Tbilisi	16	(2)
Total		348	(42)

International career
1992–2004	Georgia	69	(0)

Managerial career
- 2017–2018: Georgia U17
- 2018–2019: Shevardeni 1906
- 2019–2020: Dila Gori
- 2020–2021: Dinamo Tbilisi
- * Club domestic league appearances and goals

Georgi Nemsadze (Georgian: გიორგი ნემსაძე; 10 May 1972 – 21 October 2026) was a Georgian professional football midfielder and manager. In addition to Georgian teams, he played for many European clubs, such as Trabzonspor, Grasshoppers, Reggiana and Dundee.

Nemsadze was the five-time winner of Georgian top league and four-time winner of the national cup. He also became a Swiss champion with Grasshoppers.

== Player ==
Born in Nadzaladevi district of Tbilisi, Namsadze started his career under coach David Kipiani at Dinamo Tbilisi where he made a debut at the age of 17 in the Soviet Top League in 1989 against Shakhtar Donetsk. In his fourth stint with Dinamo in 2004, Nemsadze scored in a 2–1 home win over Wisla Krakow to help the team reach the group stage of a UEFA European competition for the first time.

Nemsadze spent memorable three and a half years at Dundee FC. On 20 April 2003, his goal in the Scottish Cup semifinal against Inverness turned out crucial as the Tayside club reached the cup final for the first time in 39 years. He was inducted into the Dundee F.C. hall of fame, and received the International Award, in 2010. He played for Dundee in the 2015 Julián Speroni testimonial versus Crystal Palace at Selhurst Park in London.

Nemsadze played for the Georgia national team between 1992 and 2004, and was capped 69 times. He captained the team in 42 games.

== Manager ==
Nemsadze started his managerial job at Dinamo Tbilisi as technical director in March 2011. He worked with Georgia U17 team as assistant coach and coach.

In early March 2019, Nemsadze was appointed as head coach at 2nd division club Shevardeni 1906. His team finished 2nd after the first half of the season producing an unbeaten run in 17 games.

In July 2019, Nemsadze took over the management at Dila Gori and led the team to 3rd place the next year. He left the club in October 2020 and shortly returned to his home team Dinamo Tbilisi as head coach. Two months later, he lifted the Georgian Super Cup as Dinamo beat Gagra on penalties. In May 2021, Nemsadze stepped down from his position to become sporting director.

== Politics ==
Between 2006 and 2011 Nemsadze was a member of Tbilisi Sakrebulo, the City Assembly from United National Movement.

In July 2021, Nemsadze rejoined politics as a candidate of the Georgian Dream party in the municipal elections. He served as the mayor of Tsageri for a one-year period until 25 November 2022.

== Death ==
Nemsadze died of a heart attack on 21 October 2026, at the age of 54.

== Personal life ==
His father Vazha (1948–2026) was a member of Dinamo Tbilisi, Locomotive, Metalurgi Rustavi and Sinatle in the late 1960s and 1970s.

Giorgi Nemsadze married Rusudan Chirgadze at the age of 17, becoming the father a year later. His elder son Vazha (b.1990) has played for a number of domestic teams, namely Dinamo Tbilisi, Sioni, Algeti, Kolkheti 1913, Zestaponi, Magaroeli, Shevardeni 1906, Dila, Iberia 2010, Aragvi, Samtskhe as well as Estonian side Narva Trans.

The pair also raised younger son Tornike and daughter Sopo.

== Honours ==
=== Player ===
- Dinamo Tbilisi

Umaglesi Liga winner (5): 1990, 1991, 1993–94, 1994–05, 2004–05

Georgian Cup winner (4): 1994, 1995, 1999–2000, 2003–04

- Grasshoppers

Swiss National Liga A winner: 1997–98

=== Coach ===
- Dinamo Tbilisi

Georgian Super Cup winner: 2021

Preceded by Nodar Akhalkatsi	Presidents of GFF; 2007	Succeeded by Nodar Akhalkatsi
