= Murtaz Shelia =

Georgian footballer (born 1969)

Personal information
- Date of birth: 25 March 1969 (age 57)
- Place of birth: Tbilisi, Georgian SSR, then Soviet Union
- Position: Defender

Senior career*
| Years | Team | Apps | (Gls) |
| 1988–1990 | Amirani Ochamchire | 28 | (3) |
| 1991–1994 | Dinamo Tbilisi | 74 | (2) |
| 1994 | 1. FC Saarbrücken | 18 | (1) |
| 1995 | Dinamo Tbilisi | 15 | (3) |
| 1995–1997 | FC Alania Vladikavkaz | 62 | (9) |
| 1997–2000 | Manchester City | 15 | (2) |
| 2000 | Dinamo Tbilisi | 3 | (1) |
| 2000–2001 | Lokomotivi Tbilisi | 7 | (2) |

International career
| 1994–1998 | Georgia | 29 | (0) |
- * Club domestic league appearances and goals

Murtaz Shelia (Georgian: მურთაზ შელია; born 25 March 1969) is a Georgian former professional footballer who played as a defender. He was capped 29 times for the Georgia national team between 1994 and 1998. His clubs included Dinamo Tbilisi, 1. FC Saarbrücken, Spartak-Alania Vladikavkaz, Manchester City and Lokomotivi Tbilisi.

== Club career ==
With Dinamo Tbilisi, Shelia formed part of a Georgian league championship winning team for five consecutive seasons (1991 to 1995). In 1995, he joined Spartak-Alania Vladikavkaz of the Russian league, where, as one of five Georgians on the books of the North Ossetians, he helped the club win the Russian league title in his first season.

Two years later Shelia joined English club Manchester City, where his former Dinamo Tbilisi team-mate Georgi Kinkladze was the star player. He marked his debut with a goal at Birmingham City, though Manchester City lost the match 2–1. Six weeks later he was joined in defence by another Georgian, Kakhaber Tskhadadze, but as the season reached its conclusion injuries restricted Shelia's appearances, and he scored just once more against Nottingham Forest. At the end of the season Manchester City were relegated, entering the third tier for the first time in their history. The following season Shelia made just three appearances before sustaining a career-threatening injury against Reading in October 1998, his final appearance for the club.

In 2000, he was released from his contract by Dinamo Tbilisi. After briefly attempting a comeback with Lokomotivi Tbilisi, he retired in 2001.

== International career ==
With the Georgia national team Shelia won 1998 Malta International Football Tournament.
