= Zaza Revishvili =

Georgian footballer

Personal information
- Date of birth: 23 September 1968 (age 58)
- Place of birth: Tbilisi, Georgian SSR
- Height: 1.74 m (5 ft 8 1/2 in)
- Position: Midfielder

Youth career
- Dinamo Tbilisi

Senior career*
Years	Team	Apps	(Gls)
1985–1992	Dinamo Tbilisi	136	(37)
1992–1993	GKS Katowice	23	(3)
1993–1995	Dinamo Tbilisi	35	(7)
1995–1996	Alania Vladikavkaz	20	(1)
1998–1999	R.W.D. Molenbeek	9	(0)

International career
1994–1996	Georgia	11	(0)
- * Club domestic league appearances and goals

Zaza Revishvili (Georgian: ზაზა რევიშვილი; born 23 September 1968) is a Georgian former professional footballer who played as a midfielder. He was the captain of FC Dinamo Tbilisi (1991–1992).

== Honours ==
Europameister U17 Team UDSSR 1985

Dinamo Tbilisi

- Umaglesi Liga: 1990, 1991, 1991–92, 1992–93, 1993–94, 1994–95
- Georgian Cup: 1992–93, 1993–94, 1994–95

Alania Vladikavkaz

- Russian Premier League: 1995
