= Davit Gvaramadze =

Georgian footballer

Personal information
- Full name: Davit Gvaramadze
- Date of birth: 8 November 1975 (age 50)
- Place of birth: Tbilisi, Soviet Union
- Height: 1.85 m (6 ft 1 in)
- Position: Goalkeeper

Senior career*
Years	Team	Apps	(Gls)
1991–1994	Dinamo Tbilisi	15	(0)
1995	Kakheti Telavi	14	(0)
1995–1996	Iberia Khashuri	30	(0)
1996–1997	Dinamo Batumi	6	(0)
1997–1998	WIT Georgia	11	(0)
1998	Skonto	6	(0)
1998–1999	Dinamo Tbilisi	25	(0)
1999–2000	Krylia Sovetov Samara	20	(0)
2000–2001	Torpedo Kutaisi	19	(0)
2002–2004	Dinamo Tbilisi	34	(0)
2004–2008	Lokomotivi Tbilisi		

International career
1998–2002, 2004	Georgia	28	(0)
- * Club domestic league appearances and goals

Davit Gvaramadze (born 8 November 1975 in Tbilisi) is a retired Georgian footballer.

== Career ==
Gvaramadze started his career at Dinamo Tbilisi. During spells at Torpedo Kutaisi, he competed with former international footballer Irakli Zoidze. Later he re-joined Zoidze in Dinamo Tbilisi.

=== International career ===
Gvaramadze made his debut on 8 February 1998, a friendly match. He became a regular during UEFA Euro 2000 qualifying, played 6 matches. He also played 6 matches in 2002 FIFA World Cup qualification (UEFA). In October 2002, he was withdrawn from Georgia squad due to family reason, Since that match, he lost the regular place to Giorgi Lomaia. He played his farewell games in 2004 Cyprus Tournament.
