= FC Shevardeni-1906 Tbilisi =

FC Shevardeni 1906 Tbilisi
- Full name: Football Club Shevardeni 1906 Tbilisi
- Founded: 1906; 120 years ago
- Dissolved: 2022; 4 years ago
- Ground: Shevardeni Ground; Tbilisi, Georgia
- Capacity: 2,000
- 2022: 10th of 10 (expelled)
- Website: http://shevardeni1906.ge/
Home colours	Away colours

FC Shevardeni-1906 Tbilisi was a Georgian football club based in Tbilisi. They most recently played in the Liga 3, the third tier of Georgian football from 2023. They were the oldest Georgian association football club.

== History ==
Shevardeni were founded in 1906 after a Czech public figure named Jaroslav Svatoš invited several athletics coaches to Georgia at the end of the 19th century and formed a sports society called Sokol (Czech word for Falcon that was later translated to Georgian Shevardeni). The club played its first match on October 23, 1911, against the united team of different sports societies and won the game 1–0.

During Soviet times, up until 1986, the club played in regional tournaments and in 1987 was promoted to the Vtoraya Liga (third division) of Soviet championship. In 1990, after the restoration of Georgia's independence, Shevardeni changed its name to Shevardeni 1906 and played in Umaglesi Liga until 1996, having finished as runners-up in the 1992–93 season. later it merged with Universiteti Tbilisi of Pirveli Liga to form TSU Tbilisi. Recently the club was re-established as Shevardeni 1906 and its new representatives have vowed to bring the team back to the top Georgian division. The club started to play in regional league in 2015 and within less than 3 years was promoted to Erovnuli Liga 2, which is the second tier of Georgian professional football league.

In May 2022, the GFF Disciplinary Committee ruled that Dinamo Zugdidi and Shevardeni-1906 match-fixing and thus they were expelled from the league with immediate effect on 22 May. For this reason all their team or individual records have been annulled from the statistics of Erovnuli Liga 2 for the season 2022.

They later ceased to exist.

== Current squad ==
As of 27 July 2023 Note: Flags indicate national team as defined under FIFA eligibility rules; some limited exceptions apply. Players may hold more than one non-FIFA nationality.

No.	Pos.	Nation	Player
1	GK	GEO	Giorgi Nadiradze
2	DF	GEO	Archil Basaria
3	DF	UKR	Andriy Slinkin
4	DF	GEO	Beka Kharshiladze
7	MF	GEO	Vazha Nemsadze
11	MF	GEO	Zviad Sikharulia
15	FW	UKR	Yevheniy Lozovyi

No.	Pos.	Nation	Player
16	GK	GEO	Giorgi Somkhishvili
19	DF	GEO	Vazha Lomashvili
23	DF	GEO	Nikoloz Jishkariani
25	FW	GEO	Tamaz Babunadze
28	GK	GEO	Lasha Gurgenidze
31	DF	BLR	Nika Basariya
39	DF	GEO	Toma Khubashvili

== Honours ==
- Georgian Umaglesi Liga
  - Runner-up: 1992–93
- Georgian Soviet Championship
  - Winner: 1986
