= Deaths in February 1995 =

The following is a list of notable deaths in February 1995.

Entries for each day are listed alphabetically by surname. A typical entry lists information in the following sequence:

- Name, age, country of citizenship at birth, subsequent country of citizenship (if applicable), reason for notability, cause of death (if known), and reference.

== February 1995 ==
=== 1 ===
- Róbert Antal, 73, Hungarian water polo player and Olympic gold medalist (1952).
- Joe Bacuzzi, 78, English footballer and coach.
- Lajos Balthazár, 73, Hungarian Olympic fencer (1948, 1952, 1956).
- François Boutin, 58, French thoroughbred horse trainer, heart attack.
- Gerard Carlier, 77, Dutch Olympic high jumper (1936).
- Richey Edwards, 27, Welsh musician. (disappeared on this date)
- Yngve Gamlin, 68, Swedish actor and film director.
- Karl Gruber, 85, Austrian politician and diplomat.
- Yves Leduc, 86, Canadian politician, member of the House of Commons of Canada (1954–1958).
- Leon Leonard, 85, American politician.
- Jill Phipps, 31, English animal rights activist, crushed by a lorry during a protest.
- Walter Wischniewsky, 82, German film editor.

=== 2 ===
- Tikvah Alper, 86, South African scientist whose work helped develop prion theory.
- Raymond Bark-Jones, 83, English rugby union lock.
- Doug Berndt, 45, American figure skater and Olympian (1972).
- Phillip Borsos, 41, Australian-born Canadian film director, producer, and screenwriter, leukemia.
- Chandulal Chandrakar, 75, Indian journalist and politician.
- John Clogston, 41, American journalist and academic.
- André Frossard, 80, French journalist and essayist.
- Thomas Hayward, 77, American operatic tenor, kidney failure.
- David Kindersley, 79, British stone letter-carver and typeface designer.
- Mate Mojtić, 81, Yugoslavian Olympic rower (1948).
- Fred Perry, 85, English tennis champion.
- Donald Pleasence, 75, English actor (Halloween, You Only Live Twice, The Great Escape), BAFTA winner (1959), heart failure.
- Herman Tuvesson, 92, Swedish Olympic wrestler (1932, 1936).
- Willard Waterman, 80, American actor (The Great Gildersleeve, The Apartment, Dennis the Menace), bone cancer.

=== 3 ===
- Ragnar Berge, 70, Norwegian footballer who played for Vålerenga Fotball.
- Pavol Hrivnák, 63, Slovak politician.
- Art Kane, 69, American photographer, suicide.
- Nicolás Lindley López, 86, Peruvian military commander.
- Andrei Nikolsky, 36, Russian pianist, traffic collision.
- Ingeborg Nilsson, 70, Norwegian figure skater and Olympian (1952).
- John Pinsent, 72, English classical scholar who specialized in Greek mythology.
- Abbas Zaryab, 75, Iranian historian, writer, literature professor and Iranologist.

=== 4 ===
- David Alexander, 56, Welsh singer and entertainer, heart attack.
- Hamza Boubakeur, 82, French politician and Muslim cleric.
- Godfrey Brown, 79, British track and field athlete and Olympic champion (1936).
- Abel Santa Cruz, 80, Argentine screenwriter, cancer.
- Aloísio de Oliveira, 80, Brazilian record producer, singer, actor and composer.
- Eric Grimbeek, 86, South African Olympic sprinter (1936).
- Manohar Hardikar, 58, Indian Test cricket player.
- Patricia Highsmith, 74, American author (The Talented Mr. Ripley, Strangers on a Train, The Price of Salt), lung cancer and aplastic anemia.
- Charlie Montgomery, 70, Australian rugby league footballer.
- Dave Newman, 71, Australian rules footballer.
- Scott Smith, 46, American gay rights activist, AIDS-related pneumonia.
- Roel Wiersma, 62, Dutch footballer.
- Walter Zeller, 67, German Grand Prix motorcycle road racer.

=== 5 ===
- Jimmy Allen, 85, English footballer and football manager.
- Frank Costin, 74, British automotive engineer.
- Des Foley, 54, Irish Gaelic football player and hurler.
- Doug McClure, 59, American actor (The Virginian, Out of This World, Gidget), lung cancer.
- Frederick Riddle, 82, British violist.
- Bhanubandhu Yugala, 84, Thai film director, playwright, composer and author.

=== 6 ===
- Flora Anne Armitage, 83, American biographer and novelist.
- Richard H. Bassett, 94, American impressionist painter.
- Elmer Burkart, 78, American baseball player (Philadelphia Phillies).
- Edy Campagnoli, 60, Italian television personality and actress.
- Chester E. Holifield, 91, American businessman and politician, member of the United States House of Representatives (1943–1974).
- Hans Hummel, 50, Austrian Grand Prix motorcycle road racer.
- Jeanette Kawas, 49, Honduran environmental activist, homicide.
- Mira Lobe, 81, Austrian children's writer.
- Maruja Mallo, 93, Spanish surrealist painter.
- James Merrill, 68, American poet, AIDS-related complications.
- Gustav Rödel, 79, German fighter pilot and fighter ace.
- Art Taylor, 65, American jazz drummer.
- Xia Yan, 94, Chinese playwright, screenwriter, and politician.

=== 7 ===
- Roy S. Benson, 88, American naval officer.
- Jean Giraudeau, 78, French tenor and artist.
- Odd Grythe, 76, Norwegian radio and television personality.
- Billy Jones, 45, American guitarist, singer, and founding member of the Outlaws, suicide by gunshot.
- Eugène Kracher, 85, French Olympic wrestler (1936).
- Massimo Pallottino, 85, Italian archaeologist specializing in Etruscan civilization and art.
- John Thomas, 58, Australian Olympic ice hockey player (1960).
- Cecil Upshaw, 52, American baseball player, heart attack.
- Helen Wallis, 70, British Map Curator at the British Museum, cancer.

=== 8 ===
- Józef Maria Bocheński, 92, Polish Dominican, logician and philosopher.
- Kalpana Datta, 81, Indian independence movement activist.
- May Miller, 96, American poet, playwright and educator.
- Tika Ram Paliwal, 85, Indian politician.
- Osvaldo Panzutto, 65, Argentine football player.
- Gloria Shea, 84, American film actress.
- Bhaskar Sadashiv Soman, 81, Indian Navy admiral.
- Willi Soukop, 88, English sculptor.
- Rachel Thomas, 89, Welsh actress, fall.
- Ole Torvalds, 78, Finnish-Swedish journalist and poet.
- Buck Warnick, 79, American composer, arranger, lyricist, conductor, and musical director.

=== 9 ===
- J. William Fulbright, 89, American senator and congressman, stroke.
- Muriel Guggolz, 90, American Olympic fencer (1932).
- Maurice Halperin, 88, American writer, professor, diplomat, and accused Soviet spy.
- Kalevi Keihänen, 70, Finnish entrepreneur.
- Eugen Loderer, 74, German trade union leader.
- Ignazio Spalla, 70, Italian film actor.
- David Wayne, 81, American actor (Finian's Rainbow, House Calls, The Andromeda Strain), Tony winner (1947, 1954), lung cancer.

=== 10 ===
- Leila Arjumand Banu, 66, Bangladeshi singer and social activist.
- Dinesh Chandra Chattopadhyay, 78, Bengali writer and editor.
- Straight Clark, 70, American tennis player.
- Jesús Garay, 64, Spanish football player.
- Paul Monette, 49, American author, poet, and activist, AIDS-related complications.
- Leonard Silk, 77, American economist, author, and journalist.

=== 11 ===
- Lillian K. Bradley, 73, American mathematician and mathematics educator.
- Irving Loeb Goldberg, 88, American circuit judge (United States Court of Appeals for the Fifth Circuit).
- L. C. Graves, 76, American police detective.
- Otto Kratky, 92, Austrian physicist.
- Herbert McWilliams, 87, South African Olympic sailor (1948).
- Harry Merkel, 77, German racing driver.
- Bob Randall, 57, American screenwriter, playwright, novelist, and television producer.

=== 12 ===
- Nat Holman, 98, American basketball player and college coach.
- Philip Taylor Kramer, 42, American bass guitar player, traffic collision.
- Earring George Mayweather, 67, American electric blues and Chicago blues harmonica player, songwriter and singer, liver cancer.
- Rachid Mimouni, 49, Algerian writer, teacher and human rights activist, hepatitis.
- Frank Jerome Murray, 90, American district judge (United States District Court for the District of Massachusetts).
- Tony Secunda, 54, English manager of rock groups (The Moody Blues, Procol Harum, The Move and Motörhead), heart attack.
- Astrid Villaume, 71, Danish actress of stage and film.

=== 13 ===
- Sylvester Ahola, 92, American jazz trumpeter and cornetist.
- James P. Berkeley, 87, United States Marine Corps lieutenant general.
- Bill Beveridge, 85, Canadian ice hockey goaltender in the NHL.
- Alberto Burri, 79, Italian artist.
- Wilton Gaynair, 68, Jamaican jazz saxophonist.
- Ray Hamilton, 79, American gridiron football player (Cleveland/Los Angeles Rams, Detroit Lions).
- Guglielmo Mancori, 67, Italian cinematographer, lighting director and camera operator.
- Sepp Mühlbauer, 90, Swiss Olympic ski jumper (1928).
- Jack O'Billovich, 52, Canadian football player.
- Shimon Schwab, 86, German-American Orthodox rabbi.
- Zeki Şensan, 57, Turkish Olympic footballer (1960).
- Bruno Visentini, 80, Italian politician, senator, minister, and industrialist.
- Li Zhisui, 75, Chinese physician and confidante of Mao Zedong.

=== 14 ===
- Ogdo Aksyonova, 59, Dolgan poet, the founder of Dolgan written literature.
- Maria Andergast, 82, German actress.
- Jack Cleary, 83, Australian rules footballer.
- Constance Teander Cohen, 74, American painter.
- Roger de Grey, 76, British landscape painter.
- Nigel Finch, 45, English film director and filmmaker, AIDS-related illness.
- Michael V. Gazzo, 71, American playwright and actor (The Godfather Part II, 1st & Ten, Last Action Hero), stroke.
- Len Goulden, 82, English football player.
- Søren Jensen, 75, Danish Olympic rower (1948).
- Abderrahmane Kaki, 60, Algerian actor and playwright.
- Ischa Meijer, 52, Dutch journalist, television presenter, radio presenter, critic and author, heart attack.
- U Nu, 87, Burmese politician, 1st Prime Minister of Burma.
- Bob Oristaglio, 70, American football player.
- Al Russas, 71, American football player (Detroit Lions).

=== 15 ===
- Rachid Baba Ahmed, 48, Algerian record producer, composer, and singer, murdered.
- Sergio Bertoni, 79, Italian footballer and Olympian (1936).
- Seymour Berry, 2nd Viscount Camrose, 85, British nobleman, politician, and newspaper proprietor.
- Italo Alighiero Chiusano, 68, Italian writer and critic.
- Francis Taylor, Baron Taylor of Hadfield, 90, English businessman who founded Taylor Woodrow.
- John J. Louis Jr., 69, American businessman and diplomat.
- David Monas Maloney, 82, American Roman Catholic bishop.
- Clyde Van Sickle, 87, American football player (Frankford Yellow Jackets, Green Bay Packers).

=== 16 ===
- Svend Albinus, 93, Danish architect.
- Anna Margaret Ross Alexander, 81, American philanthropist.
- Nicolae Costin, 58, Moldovan politician and one of the leaders of the national emancipation movement.
- Joe Foden, 76, Australian rules footballer.
- Mildred Esther Mathias, 88, American botanist and professor.
- Bill Regan, 86, Canadian ice hockey player (New York Rangers, New York Americans).
- Rachel Tzabari, 85, Israeli politician.
- Margaret Wade, 82, American basketball player and coach.
- David E. Ward, 85, American politician.
- Lois Wilde, 87, American actress, model, dancer, and beauty contest winner.

=== 17 ===
- Charles Balloun, 90, American politician from Iowa.
- Werner Bruschke, 96, East German politician and member of the Socialist Unity Party of Germany.
- Paddy Collins, 91, Irish hurler.
- Thelma Hulbert, 81, English visual artist known for her still lives and landscapes.
- John Kilkenny, 93, American judge.
- Vin Smith, 81, Australian rules footballer.
- Mirosław Żuławski, 82, Polish writer, prosaist, diplomat and screenwriter.

=== 18 ===
- Zair Azgur, 87, Soviet and Belarusian sculptor.
- Walter Ball, 83, Canadian cartoonist.
- Denny Cordell, 51, English record producer, lymphoma.
- Eddie Gilbert, 33, American professional wrestler and booker, heart attack.
- Bill Graham, 75, Australian politician.
- Ralph Jones, 73, American football player (Detroit Lions, Baltimore Colts).
- Yank Lawson, 83, American jazz trumpeter.
- Tracie McBride, 19, American soldier and murder victim.
- Kenneth Setton, 80, American historian and an expert on the history of medieval Europe.
- Bob Stinson, 35, American rock guitarist who founded The Replacements, organ failure.

=== 19 ===
- Soup Cable, 81, American professional basketball player.
- Yan Chernyak, 85, World War II spy for the Soviet Union.
- Louis-Pierre Cécile, 90, Canadian politician.
- Nicholas Fairbairn, 61, Scottish politician, liver cirrhosis.
- Nigel Findley, 35, Canadian game designer, editor, and science fiction author, heart attack.
- John Howard, 81, American actor (The Philadelphia Story, Lost Horizon, Bulldog Drummond Comes Back).
- Gaul Machlis, 76, Israeli football player and manager.
- Richard Matthews, 73, New Zealand plant virologist.
- Noel Rockmore, 86, American painter, draughtsman, and sculptor.
- Teodoro Salah, 77, Chilean Olympic water polo player (1948).
- Calder Willingham, 72, American novelist and screenwriter (Paths of Glory, One-Eyed Jacks, The Graduate), cancer.

=== 20 ===
- Rabbi Shlomo Zalman Auerbach, 84, Orthodox Jewish rabbi.
- Robert Bolt, 70, English playwright and screenwriter (Lawrence of Arabia, Doctor Zhivago, A Man for All Seasons), Oscar winner (1966, 1967), stroke.
- Arthur Burge, 77, Australian Olympic water polo player (1948).
- Néstor Mora, 31, Colombian racing cyclist and Olympian (1984), bicycle accident.
- William Strydom, 52, South African cricketer.

=== 21 ===
- Paul L. Bates, 86, United States Army officer.
- István Bárány, 87, Hungarian swimmer and Olympian (1924, 1928, 1932).
- Kim Byung-sun, 22, South Korean volleyball player and Olympian (1992).
- Bjarne Henning-Jensen, 86, Danish film director and screenwriter.
- Cristian Popescu, 35, Romanian poet.
- Juhan Viiding, 46, Estonian poet and actor, suicide.
- Kim Sang-hyup, 74, South Korean political scientist and 16th prime minister of South Korea 1982-1983, heart attack.

=== 22 ===
- Richard Arbib, 77, American industrial designer.
- Ed Flanders, 60, American actor (St. Elsewhere, A Moon for the Misbegotten, The Exorcist III), Emmy winner (1976, 1977, 1983), suicide by gunshot.
- Karl-Arne Holmsten, 83, Swedish film actor.
- Jim Katcavage, 60, American gridiron football player (New York Giants).
- Nicholas Pennell, 56, English actor.
- Emmanuel Roblès, 80, Algerian-French novelist and playwright.

=== 23 ===
- Norm Burns, 77, Canadian ice hockey player (New York Rangers).
- Valerio Cassani, 72, Italian footballer and Olympian (1948).
- Arrigo Cervetto, 67, Italian communist revolutionary and politician.
- Sidney Robertson Cowell, 91, American ethnomusicologist.
- Melvin Franklin, 52, American singer.
- Mehr Abdul Haq, 79, Pakistani philologist.
- Don Heck, 66, American comic book artist (Iron Man, The Avengers, Black Widow), lung cancer.
- James Herriot, 78, English veterinarian and author (All Creatures Great and Small), prostate cancer.
- Norman Hunter, 95, British children's author.
- Georges Metayer, 90, French Olympic wrestler (1924).
- John Paul, 73, British actor (Doomwatch, Dr. Finlay's Casebook, The Curse of the Mummy's Tomb).
- Margaret Woodbridge, 93, American swimmer and Olympic champion (1920).
- Peter Wykeham, 79, Royal Air Force Air marshal and flying ace during World War II.

=== 24 ===
- Roberto Ago, 87, Italian jurist.
- Felix Ermacora, 71, Austrian politician and human rights activist.
- Hans Hessling, 91, German film and television actor.
- Tatsumi Kumashiro, 67, Japanese film director, pulmonary embolism.
- Hideko Maehata, 80, Japanese swimmer, Olympic champion (1936).
- N. G. Krishna Murti, 85, Indian civil engineer.
- Jack Wallace, 69, American football player and coach, traffic accident.
- Woody Williams, 82, American baseball player (Brooklyn Dodgers, Cincinnati Reds).

=== 25 ===
- Francesco Antonazzi, 70, Italian football player and Olympian (1948).
- Gediminas Baravykas, 54, Lithuanian architect.
- Jimmy Chetcuti, 81, Maltese Olympic water polo player (1936).
- Anne Davies, 64, American figure skater.
- Rudolf Hausner, 80, Austrian painter, draughtsman, printmaker and sculptor.
- O Jin-u, 77, North Korean general and politician, lung cancer.
- Victor Montagu, 88, British Conservative Member of Parliament (MP).
- Julian Nunamaker, 49, American football player (Buffalo Bills).
- John O'Brien, 67, New Zealand rower and Olympian (1952).
- José Antonio Rojo, 72, Spanish film editor, heart attack.
- Mariam Vattalil, 41, Indian activist and nun, murdered.
- Terence Weil, 73, British cellist.

=== 26 ===
- Zenon Ivanovich Borevich, 72, Russian mathematician.
- Jack Clayton, 73, British film director (The Great Gatsby, Something Wicked This Way Comes, The Innocents).
- Barry Dyson, 52, English football player, heart attack.
- Willie Johnson, 71, American electric blues guitarist.
- Þórunn Elfa Magnúsdóttir, 84, Icelandic writer.
- Mehmet Türüt, 50, Turkish Olympic wrestler (1972).

=== 27 ===
- John Alford, 75, Archdeacon of Halifax.
- Ann Ayars, 76, American soprano and actress.
- Bill Bailey, 85, Irish-American Communist Party labor activist who fought in the Spanish Civil War, lung disease.
- Gerhard Boetzelen, 89, German Olympic rower (1932).
- Julienne Boudewijns, 65, Belgian Olympic gymnast (1948).
- Bernard Cornfeld, 67, Turkish businessman and international financier.
- Tom Evans, 65, Australian politician.
- Fernando Hernández, 70, Mexican Olympic equestrian (1968, 1972, 1976).
- Giga Norakidze, 64, Georgian football player and manager.
- Antonio Tróccoli, 70, Argentine politician.

=== 28 ===
- Walter Allen, 84, English literary critic and novelist.
- Ragnvald Mikal Andersen, 95, Norwegian politician.
- Mark Houston, 48, American composer, lyricist, actor, and director.
- George Kratina, 85, American sculptor.
- Wally Millies, 88, American baseball player (Brooklyn Dodgers, Washington Senators, Philadelphia Phillies), scout and manager.
- Bill Richards, 71, Canadian violinist, composer, arranger, and editor.
- Keith Rigg, 88, Australian cricketer.
- Max Rudolf, 92, German conductor and music educator.
- Leonard Shure, 84, American concert pianist.
- Joe Vodicka, 73, American football player (Chicago Bears, Chicago Cardinals).
