= Yves Simoens =

Belgian priest and academic (1942–2024)

- Born: 10 May 1942; Kinshasa, Belgian Congo
- Died: 8 September 2024 (aged 82)
- Education: Aix-Marseille University; Pontifical Biblical Institute
- Occupations: Jesuit priest Academic

Yves Simoens (10 May 1942 – 8 September 2024) was a Belgian Jesuit priest, biblical scholar, and academic. He specialized in the Old and New Testaments and taught at the Institut d'études théologiques in Brussels and at the Centre Sèvres in Paris. His research often pertained to Johannine literature and Christian–Jewish relations.

== Biography ==
Born in Léopoldville on 10 May 1942, Simoens joined the Society of Jesus in 1960 and studied theology in Fourvière. He earned a master's degree in modern letters from Aix-Marseille University and a doctorate in Biblical criticism from the Pontifical Biblical Institute. He remained at the latter following the completion of his degree as a guest professor. As a specialist in Johannine literature, he wrote a work on the Song of Songs. He also led Bible studies on Ignatian spirituality.

Simoens died on 8 September 2024, at the age of 82.

== Publications ==
=== Books ===
- Entrer dans l'Alliance. Une introduction au Nouveau Testament (2001)
- Selon Jean, Une traduction. Une interprétation (2004)
- Le Cantique des Cantiques, livre de la plénitude. Une lecture anthropologique et théologique (2004)
- Le Corps souffrant : de l’un à l’autre Testament (2005)
- Croire pour aimer. Les trois lettres de Jean. Une traduction, une interprétation (2011)
- Apocalypse de Jean, Apocalypse de Jésus-Christ. Une traduction. Une interprétation (2014)
- Homme et Femme. De la Genèse à l'Apocalypse (2014)
- Évangile selon Jean (2016)
- Donner Corps à la Parole. Parcours johanniques et bibliques (2019)
- Accomplir l'Écriture. Un itinéraire biblique et théologique (2020)
- Croire en Jésus selon Jean. Redécouvrir la foi de l'Évangile (2021)
- Servir l'Écriture sainte comme Parole de Dieu. Un chemin de vie (2023)

=== Collaborative works ===
- Les Versets douloureux. Bible, Évangile et Coran entre conflit et dialogue (with Soheib Bencheikh and David Meyer, 2007)
- Au service de saint Jean. Lectures du corpus johannique (with François Cassingena-Trévedy and Michel Fédou, 2012)

=== Selected articles ===
- "Le Seigneur d’Israël et le Père de Jésus-Christ" (1998)
- "Le Dieu d'Israël selon l'unité de son dessein" (1998)
- "L'Évangile selon Jean. Nouvelle lecture chrétienne" (2000)
- "L'Évangile de Jean. Positions et propositions" (2000)
- "La famille à la lumière des données bibliques" (2005)
- "Transmettre l'Écriture sainte" (2007)
- "Le prologue de l'Apocalypse" (2009)
- "Le Psaume 137 : une supplication nationale" (2011)
- "La réévaluation historique du quatrième évangile" (2014)
- "L'énigme du pain dans la demande du Notre Père (Matthieu 6,11 et Luc 11,3)" (2017)
- "La prière glorifiante de Jésus en Jn 17" (2020)
