= Ghaleb Bencheikh =

French islamicist

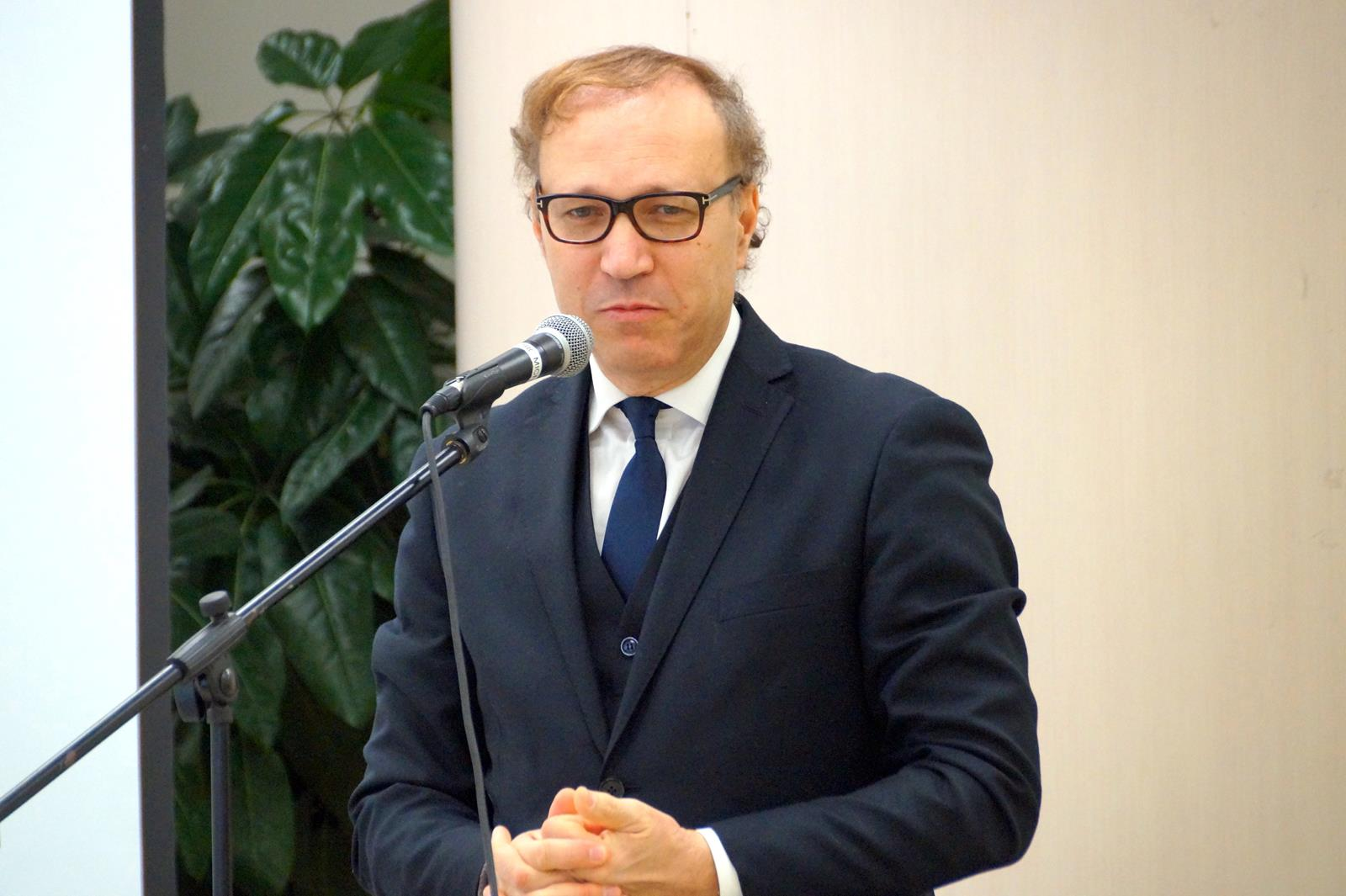
- Born: 27 August 1960 (age 65); Jeddah
- Occupation(s): Islamicist, Television presenter, Radio producer, Radio personality, Physicist

Ghaleb Bencheikh (Arabic: غالب بن الشيخ; born 1960 in Jeddah, Saudi Arabia) is a Doctor of Science and physics.

Son of Sheikh Abbas Bencheikh El Hocine and brother of Soheib Bencheikh, Ghaleb Bencheikh is the President of the "Foundation of Islam in France". He hosts the TV show "Islam" which is related to philosophical training and theology.

Ghaleb Bencheikh chairs the World Conference of Religions for Peace, which leads to many interventions in France and abroad. Speaking with ease, Ghaleb Bencheikh spread and popularize his way theses and strong ideas of his brother Soheib Bencheikh.

Ghaleb Bencheikh is a member of the sponsoring committee of the French Coalition for the Decade, spreading culture of peace and non-violence.

== See also ==
- Soheib Bencheikh
- Sheikh Abbas Bencheikh El Hocine

== Bibliography ==
- "So, what is Islam?", Ed. Presses de la Renaissance, 2001
- "Islam and Judaism in dialogue" (with Salam Shalom and Philippe Haddad and the collaboration of Jean-Philippe Caudron), ed. the Workshop, 2002
- "Secularism under the Koran", ed. Presses de la Renaissance, 2005
- "Open letter" to the Islamists (with Antoine Sfeir), Bayard, 2008
