= Sheikh Abbas =

Algerian diplomat, cleric, writer (1912–1989)

- الشيخ عباس
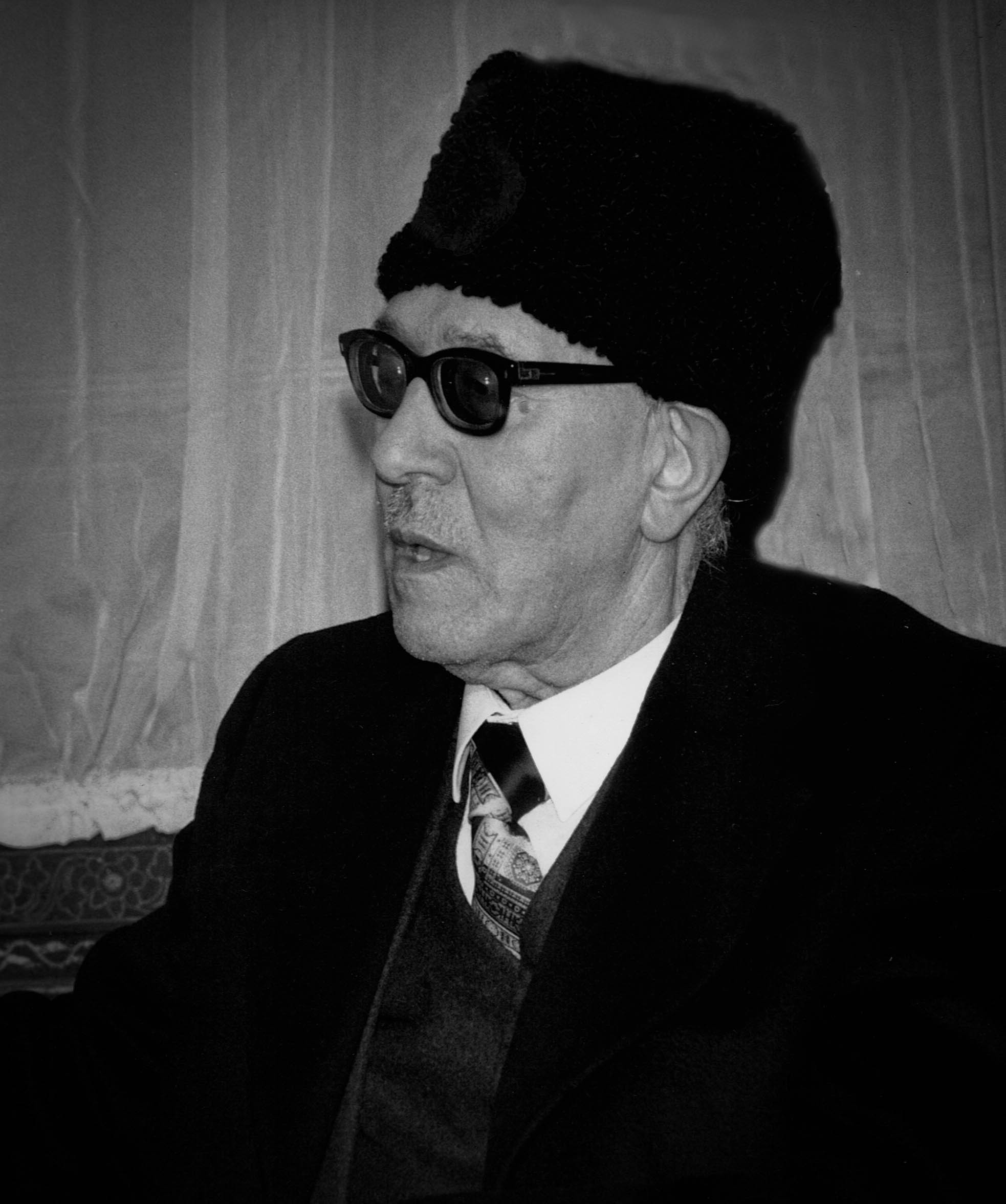
- Sheikh Abbas in 1984
- Born: 1912; Mila, French Algeria
- Died: May 3, 1989; Paris, France
- Occupation: Islamic literature
- Children: Ghaleb Bencheikh; Soheib Bencheikh

Abbas el Hocine Bencheikh, (Note: Arabic: عباس بن الشيخ الحسين) also called Sheikh Abbas, was an Algerian diplomat, cleric, writer, and rector of the Great Mosque of Paris.

== Biography ==
Abbas was born in Mila, Algeria in 1912. After theological studies in family brotherhood and once aged 21, Sheikh Abbas studied at the Islamic University of Zaytuna in Tunis and that of al-Qarawiyyin in Fez.

After ten years, he returned to Algeria and became the disciple of the reformer Abdel-Hamid ibn Badis after joining the Association of Algerian Muslim Ulema. He campaigned with him for religious and political reform, which Muslim reformists refer to as Islah.

He joined the Algerian National Movement and the Provisional Government of the Algerian Republic, serving as its ambassador to Saudi Arabia from 1957 to 1962. After Algeria's independence, Sheikh Abbas was appointed permanent delegate to the Arab league in 1965, and then advisor to the President of the Republic in 1966.

At the time of Algeria's independence, he was appointed ambassador to Saudi Arabia. Following his resignation from the post, he has held the office of President of the Supreme Islamic Council of Algeria, a seat he left to pursue weekly preaching in the Djamaa el Kebir mosque in Algiers.

In 1982, Sheikh Abbas took charge of the Great Mosque of Paris, succeeding Sheikh Hamza Boubakeur.

He restructured the mosque by creating a second prayer room and putting in place additional social services. He allowed the mosque to receive a share of a specific budget from the Ministry of Religious Affairs and Endowments of Algeria and, secondly, to develop the current body of 80 imams. He intervened to resolve the painful issue of divorce between binational families, especially in defending the rights of French mothers whose children had been brought to Algeria after the divorce. He also interjected to facilitate the return of many French Muslims, known as Harkis, who had left Algeria since independence in 1962 and stayed there instead.

Abbas died in Paris on May 3, 1989.

== See also ==
- Dalil Boubakeur
- Roger Garaudy
