= Ralph Evans (sailor) =

American sailor

Personal information
- Born: 7 February 1924 New York City
- Died: 23 July 2000 (aged 76)

Sport
- Sport: Sailing
Medal record
Representing the United States
Olympic Games
Silver medal – second place	1948 London	Firefly class

Ralph Evans (7 February 1924 – 23 July 2000) was an American competitive sailor and Olympic medalist. He won a silver medal in the Firefly class at the 1948 Summer Olympics in London.
