= Alfons Oswald =

Swiss sailor (1914–2005)

Personal information
- Full name: Alfons Felix Oswald
- Nationality: Swiss
- Born: 4 May 1914
- Died: 19 September 2005 (aged 91)

Sport
- Sport: Sailing

Alfons Oswald (4 May 1914 – 19 September 2005) was a Swiss sailor. He competed in the Firefly event at the 1948 Summer Olympics. He died on 19 September 2005, at the age of 91.
