= Livio Spanghero =

Italian sailor

Personal information
- Nationality: Italian
- Born: 7 February 1920; Turriaco, Italy
- Died: 2 April 2008 (aged 88); Monfalcone, Italy

Sport
- Sport: Sailing

Livio Spanghero (7 February 1920 – 2 April 2008) was an Italian sailor. He competed in the Firefly event at the 1948 Summer Olympics.
