= Koos de Jong =

Dutch sailor (1912–1993)

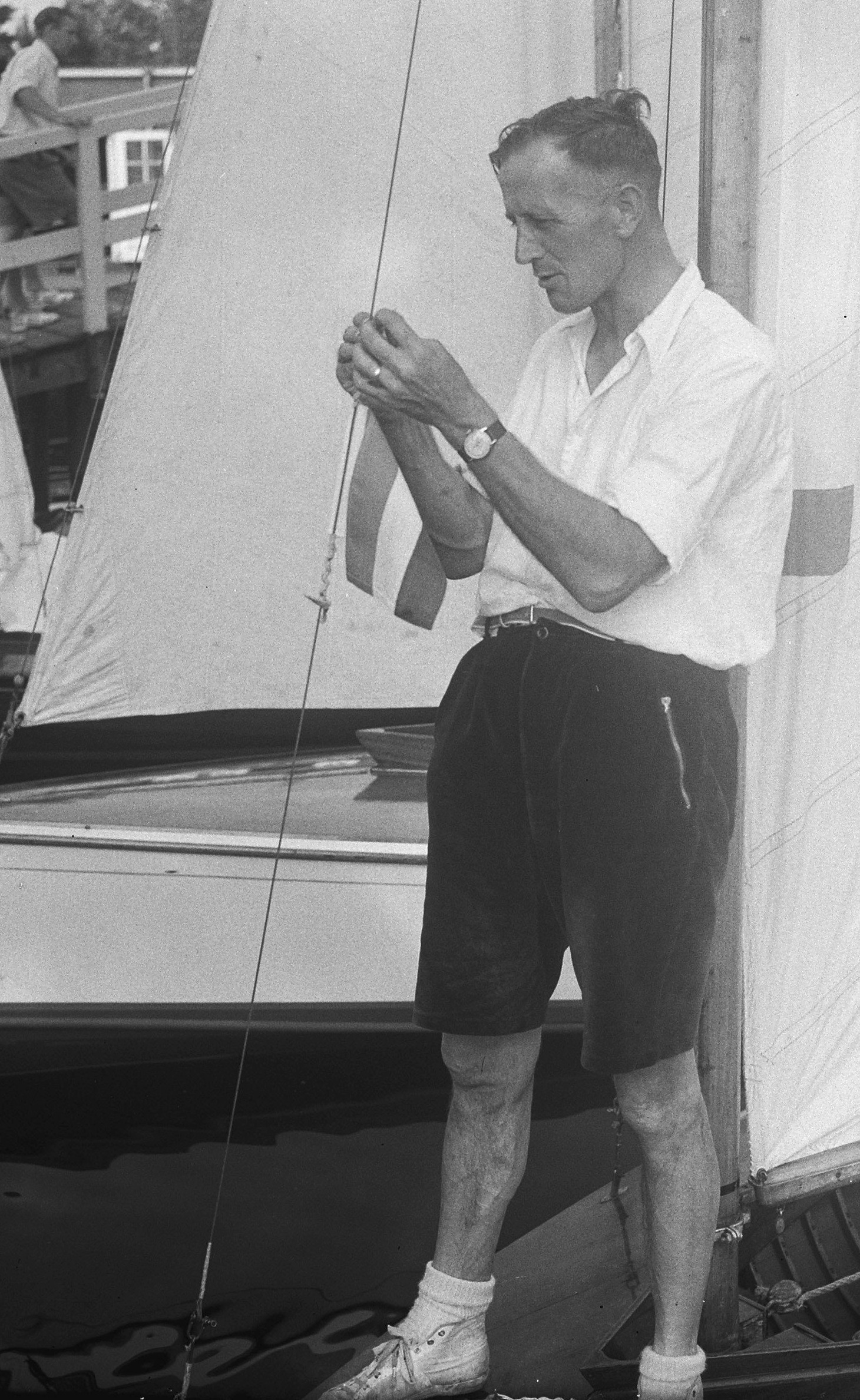
- Koos de Jong in 1951

Personal information
- Full name: Jacobus Hermanus Hendrik Jan de Jong
- Nationality: Dutch
- Born: 7 April 1912 Rotterdam, the Netherlands
- Died: 20 August 1993 (aged 81) Capelle aan den IJssel, the Netherlands
- Height: 195 cm (6 ft 5 in)
- Weight: 100 kg (220 lb)

Sailing career
- Sport: Sailing
- Class(es): Firefly, Finn
Medal record
Representing Netherlands
Olympic Games
Bronze medal – third place	1948 Torbay	Firefly
European Championships
Bronze medal – third place	1955 Austria	Finn
Gold medal – first place	1959 Switzerland	Finn
Bronze medal – third place	1962 Germany	Finn
- Updated on 2014-01-04

Jacobus Hermanus Hendrik Jan "Koos" de Jong (7 April 1912 – 20 August 1993) was a sailor from the Netherlands. He competed in the Firefly event at the 1948 Olympics and in the Finn event at the 1952 Games and won a bronze medal in 1948, placing fourth in 1952. De Jong won several medals at European championships, including the gold in 1959.

== Sources ==
- "DE KEUZEWEDSTRIJDEN VOOR DE OLYMPISCHE SPELEN" (in Dutch) (Evening ed.). Nieuwsblad van Friesland: Hepkema's courant. 25 June 1946.
- "Bronzen medailles voor Bob Maas en Koos de Jong" (in Dutch) (Dag ed.). Het vrĳe volk: democratisch-socialistisch dagblad. 13 August 1948.
- "The Official Report of the Organising Committee for the XIV Olympiad London 1948" (PDF). 1951. Archived from the original (PDF) on 16 July 2011.
- "OLYMPISCHE ZEILPLOEG" (in Dutch) (Morning ed.). De vrije pers: ochtendbulletin. 20 June 1952.
- "The Official Report of the Organising Committee for the games of the XV Olympiad Helsinki 1952" (PDF). 1955. Archived from the original (PDF) on 11 April 2008.
