= Pierre Van Der Haeghen =

Belgian sailor 1921–2000

Personal information
- Nationality: Belgian
- Born: 27 December 1921; Ghent, Belgium
- Died: 17 May 2000 (aged 78); Ghent, Belgium

Sport
- Sport: Sailing

Pierre Van Der Haeghen (27 December 1921 – 17 May 2000) was a Belgian sailor. He competed in the Firefly event at the 1948 Summer Olympics.
