= List of Georgia national football team captains =

This article lists all the captains of the Georgian national men's football team.

The first Georgian captain was Gela Ketashvili: he captained Georgia in the first ever international match, against Lithuania on 27 May 1990.

== List of Captains ==
Player	Georgian career	Total caps	Caps as captain	First captaincy	Last captaincy
Gela Ketashvili	1990	1	1	27 Mai 1990	27 Mai 1990
Kakha Tskhadadze	1991–1998	25	23	2 February 1991	30 Mai 1998
Gia Jishkariani	1991–1994	9	4	2 September 1992	25 March 1993
Murtaz Shelia	1991–1998	29	5	12 February 1994	11 October 1995
Gocha Jamarauli	1994–2004	62	7	26 June 1994	13 October 2004
Temur Ketsbaia	1992–2003	52	7	15 November 1995	27 March 2002
Giorgi Kiknadze	1996–1999	10	3	15 December 1996	18 November 1998
Georgi Nemsadze	1992–2004	69	36	24 September 1997	30 March 2004
Nikoloz Togonidze	1997–1999	11	1	6 February 1998	6 February 1998
Davit Gvaramadze	1998–2004	28	3	8 February 1998	2 Mai 1998
Kakha Kaladze	1996–2011	83	52	4 September 1999	11 October 2011
Irakli Zoidze	1994–2001	20	1	9 September 2001	9 September 2001
Giorgi Kinkladze	1992–2005	54	1	17 April 2002	17 April 2002
Giorgi Shashiashvili	2001-2010	31	1	12 February 2003	12 February 2003
Zurab Khizanishvili	1999-2013	94	10	9 February 2005	24 Mai 2012
Levan Kobiashvili	1996–2011	100	16	1 March 2006	25 Mai 2010
Lasha Jakobia	2004-2008	13	1	23 March 2006	23 March 2006
Levan Tskitishvili	1995–2009	58	3	12 September 2007	9 September 2009
Aleksandre Amisulashvili	2003–2016	50	7	14 November 2011	5 September 2016
Jaba Kankava	2004–2024	101	61	15 August 2012	9 October 2021
Guram Kashia	2009–2026	129	51	6 February 2013	2 June 2026
Giorgi Navalovski	2008–2020	41	1	15 November 2018	15 November 2018
Giorgi Loria	2008-2025	79	3	14 October 2020	5 June 2025
Tornike Okriashvili	2010–2021	50	1	2 February 2021	2 February 2021
Otar Kakabadze	2015–	77	1	8 September 2021	8 September 2021
Solomon Kvirkvelia	2014–2024	62	1	12 October 2023	12 October 2023
Otar Kiteishvili	2017–	53	1	20 March 2025	20 March 2025
Khvicha Kvaratskhelia	2019 –	50	6	7 September 2025	5 June 2026
