= Ramaz Svanadze =

Georgian football coach

Personal information
- Full name: Ramaz Svanadze
- Date of birth: 2 March 1981 (age 45)
- Place of birth: Georgia, Soviet Union
- Position: Defender

Team information
- Current team: Georgia (head coach)

Senior career*
Years	Team	Apps	(Gls)
1998–2000	STU Tbilisi	47	(0)
2000–2001	Dinamo Tbilisi	28	(0)
2002–2003	Sioni Bolnisi	7	(0)
2003–2004	Kolkheti Poti	33	(3)
2004–2005	Locomotive Tbilisi	6	(0)
Total		121	(3)

International career
1999	Georgia U18	2	(0)
2001–2002	Georgia U21	8	(0)

Managerial career
- 2013–2015: Dinamo Tbilisi (assistant)
- 2015–2017: Inter Baku (assistant)
- 2019–2021: Georgia U19
- 2020: Georgia (caretaker)
- 2021–2026: Georgia U21
- 2026–: Georgia
- * Club domestic league appearances and goals

Ramaz Svanadze (Georgian: რამაზ სვანაძე; born 2 March 1981) is a Georgian football coach and former player, who is currently the head coach of the Georgian national team.

== Playing career ==
Svanadze played for several Georgian clubs before he was forced to retire due to an injury in 2005 at the age of 24.

== Managerial career ==
His first managerial job at Dinamo Tbilisi lasted two years. Svanadze worked as an assistant coach under Malkhaz Zhvania, Kakha Gogichaishvili, Michal Bílek and Gia Geguchadze.

On 1 March 2019, he was appointed as U19 head coach. His team beat all three opponents in the 2020 UEFA U19 qualifiers and advanced to next stage but due to COVID-19, the tournament was suspended.

He was the caretaker coach of the senior team after Slovak coach Vladimír Weiss resigned from the team, and appeared at the last match of the UEFA Nations League on 18 November 2020, in a match against Estonia, in a 0–0 draw, finishing in third place in League C.

In February 2021, Svanadze took charge of U21s, who were due to take part in a European Championship for the first time. The team under his management finished on top of the table and reached quarterfinals only to lose in a penalty shoot-out.

In January 2024, Svanadze signed a one-year contract extension with the Football Federation. In the same year, he led the team to a hard-fought qualification to the UEFA European Championship held in Slovakia in 2025.

On 26 September 2026, Svanadze was appointed as head coach of the Georgia national team until the end of 2028.

== Personal life ==
Ramaz Svanadze is the nephew of former midfielder Zaur Svanadze, who played at Dinamo Tbilisi in the early 1980s, which is widely regarded as the golden period of the club. With the latter at the helm of Azerbaijani Premier League club Inter Baku between 2015 and 2018, Ramaz Svanadze worked as his assistant. They reversed the roles several years later when Ramaz took charge of the U21 team.

His father Mamuka Svanadze was also a football player known for his tenure at Torpedo Kutaisi.
