= Georgia national football team =

Men's association football team

Georgia
- Nicknames: Georgian: ჯვაროსნები Jvarosnebi (The Crusaders)
- Association: Georgian Football Federation (GFF)
- Confederation: UEFA (Europe)
- Head coach: Ramaz Svanadze
- Captain: Khvicha Kvaratskhelia
- Most caps: Guram Kashia (129)
- Top scorer: Shota Arveladze (26)
- Home stadium: Boris Paichadze Dinamo Arena (main); Adjarabet Arena (second); Mikheil Meskhi Stadium & Ramaz Shengelia Stadium (third)
- FIFA code: GEO
First colours	Second colours	Third colours

FIFA ranking
- Current: 74 (18 November 2026)
- Highest: 42 (September 1998)
- Lowest: 156 (March 1994)

First international
- Unofficial; Georgian SSR 2–4 Azerbaijan SSR (Tbilisi, Georgian SSR; December 1926); Official; Lithuania 1–0 Georgia (Kaunas, Lithuania; 2 September 1992)

Biggest win
- Georgia 8–0 Thailand (Tbilisi, Georgia; 12 October 2023)

Biggest defeat
- Georgia 1–7 Spain (Tbilisi, Georgia; 8 September 2023)

European Championship
- Appearances: 1 (first in 2024)
- Best result: Round of 16 (2024)
- Website: nakrebi.ge (in Georgian)

The Georgia national football team (Georgian: საქართველოს ეროვნული საფეხბურთო ნაკრები, romanized: sakartvelos erovnuli sapekhburto nak'rebi) represents Georgia in men's international football matches, and is controlled by the Georgian Football Federation, the governing body for football in Georgia. It is a member of UEFA in Europe and FIFA in global competitions.

The Georgian team's first match took place on 27 May 1990 against Lithuania, while Georgia was still part of the Soviet Union. The team have attempted to qualify for each major tournament from Euro 1996 onwards. Their efforts culminated in their first successful qualification for a major tournament, the UEFA Euro 2024, secured with a win against Greece in the UEFA Euro 2024 qualifying play-off final.

Along with Russia, Ukraine and Latvia, Georgia is one of the few post-Soviet states to qualify for the UEFA European Championship finals, though it has yet to take part in a FIFA World Cup.

The team is colloquially referred to as Jvarosnebi (The Crusaders) and since 2022 has adopted Saint George as their symbol, which is a patron of Georgia.

Upon its admission into FIFA ranked 156th, Georgia ascended to their peak World Ranking of 42nd in 1998. The team plays their home games at the Boris Paichadze Dinamo Arena in Tbilisi.

== History ==
=== 20th century ===
Football was introduced to Georgia by English sailors in early 20th century. British ships that docked at the harbors of Poti and Batumi frequently hosted football matches among their crew, attracting the attention of Lelo burti players, who quickly embraced and adapted the sport. While the exact date of the first football match in Georgia remains uncertain, football was first mentioned in the Georgian press in 1890.

From 1923 to 1990, Georgian football players were part of the USSR national team, with two of them, Murtaz Khurtsilava and Aleksandre Chivadze, serving as captains at different times. During the early Soviet era, Georgia competed in the Transcaucasian Championship, hosting the 1926 edition. Georgia's first game came against Azerbaijan in Tbilisi, losing 4–2 in Tbilisi. The Georgian SSR's first win came in their second game, beating Armenia 7–0. Georgia would later host the 1927 and 1928 editions of the Transcaucasian Championship, winning the latter edition after a 5–1 and 6–0 win over Armenia and Azerbaijan respectively. After a six-year hiatus, Georgia played in the 1934 competition in Azerbaijan, before once against hosting the 1935 Transcaucasian Championship, winning it once again.

During this period, the USSR national team included players from various Soviet republics, including Georgian SSR. Georgian players made significant contributions to the team, with several becoming key figures and achieving notable success, such as Slava Metreveli scoring in the 1960 European Nations' Cup final. One of the most famous Georgian footballers who played for the USSR national team was Murtaz Khurtsilava, who captained the team and played a crucial role in the 1966 FIFA World Cup, where the USSR finished in fourth place. Another prominent player was Vitaly Daraselia, known for his performances in the 1980s, along with David Kipiani, Ramaz Shengelia and Vladimir Gutsaev.

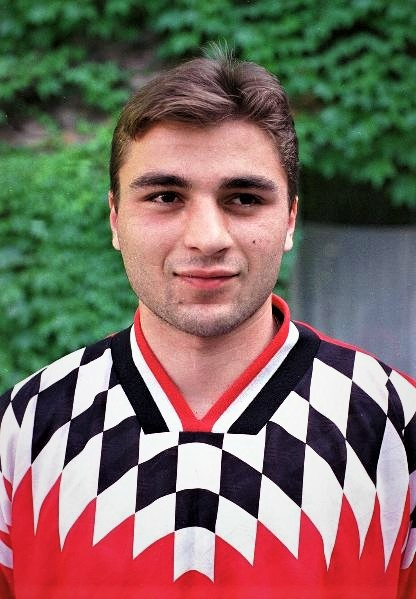
Georgi Kinkladze, the Georgian Maradona, made his debut in 1992.

Following Soviet rule in Georgia, the contemporary history of the Georgia national football team began in 1990, when the team played their first international match against Lithuania, the first country to accept an invitation. The match was held on 27 May 1990 at the national stadium. Georgia were coached by Givi Nodia. The friendly match ended in a 2–2 draw. This was the only match prior to the declaration of independence on 9 April 1991. Soon afterwards the team played another friendly match against Moldova.

The Georgian Football Federation became a member of both UEFA and FIFA in 1992, enabling Georgia to play competitive matches. The first of these came in September 1994, a 1–0 defeat to Moldova as part of the qualifiers for Euro 1996. Georgia finished third in their group, ahead of Moldova, Wales and Albania, but seven points behind second-placed qualifier Bulgaria.

Georgia failed to qualify for the 1998 World Cup in France, obtaining 10 points and finishing in fourth place, level on points with Poland. At this time, Georgia reached 42nd place in the FIFA World Ranking.

=== 21st century ===
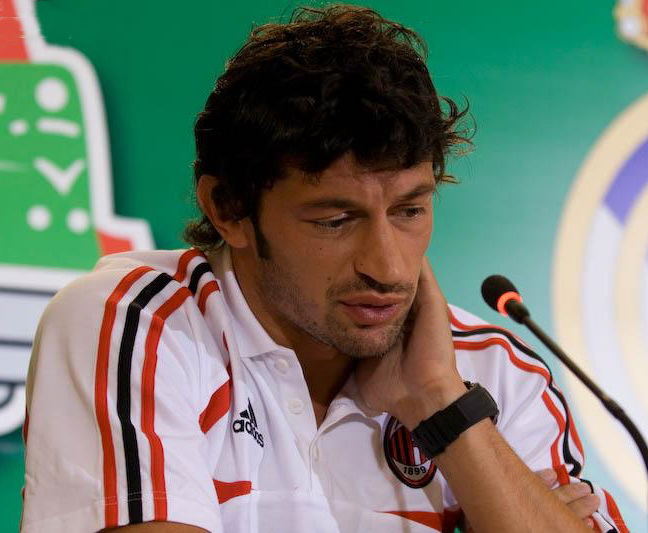
Kakha Kaladze, former captain of the national team.

During UEFA Euro 2000 qualifying the Georgia national team won one match, drew two and finished at the bottom of the group with five points.

The team finished fifth (and last) with seven points in their qualifying group for Euro 2004, although they defeated Russia with a goal scored by Malkhaz Asatiani.

In the 2006 World Cup qualifiers Georgia beat Albania 2–0 at home and Kazakhstan away 2–1. They finished sixth of seven with ten points in Group 2.

Georgia were sixth out of seven teams in the Euro 2008 qualifying group with ten points. They defeated Scotland 2–0 at home and the Faroe Islands 6–0 away and 3–1 at home.

Héctor Cúper became the manager of Georgia in August 2008. During the qualification round for the 2010 FIFA World Cup Georgia failed to win any matches and finished sixth (and last) with three points. Cuper didn't extend his contract, and on 6 November 2009, Temur Ketsbaia was appointed as the new manager of the Georgian national team. Ketsbaia resigned as manager after a 4–0 defeat at home to Poland in the Euro 2016 qualifiers on 14 November 2014, having previously stated he would do so before the match regardless of the result.

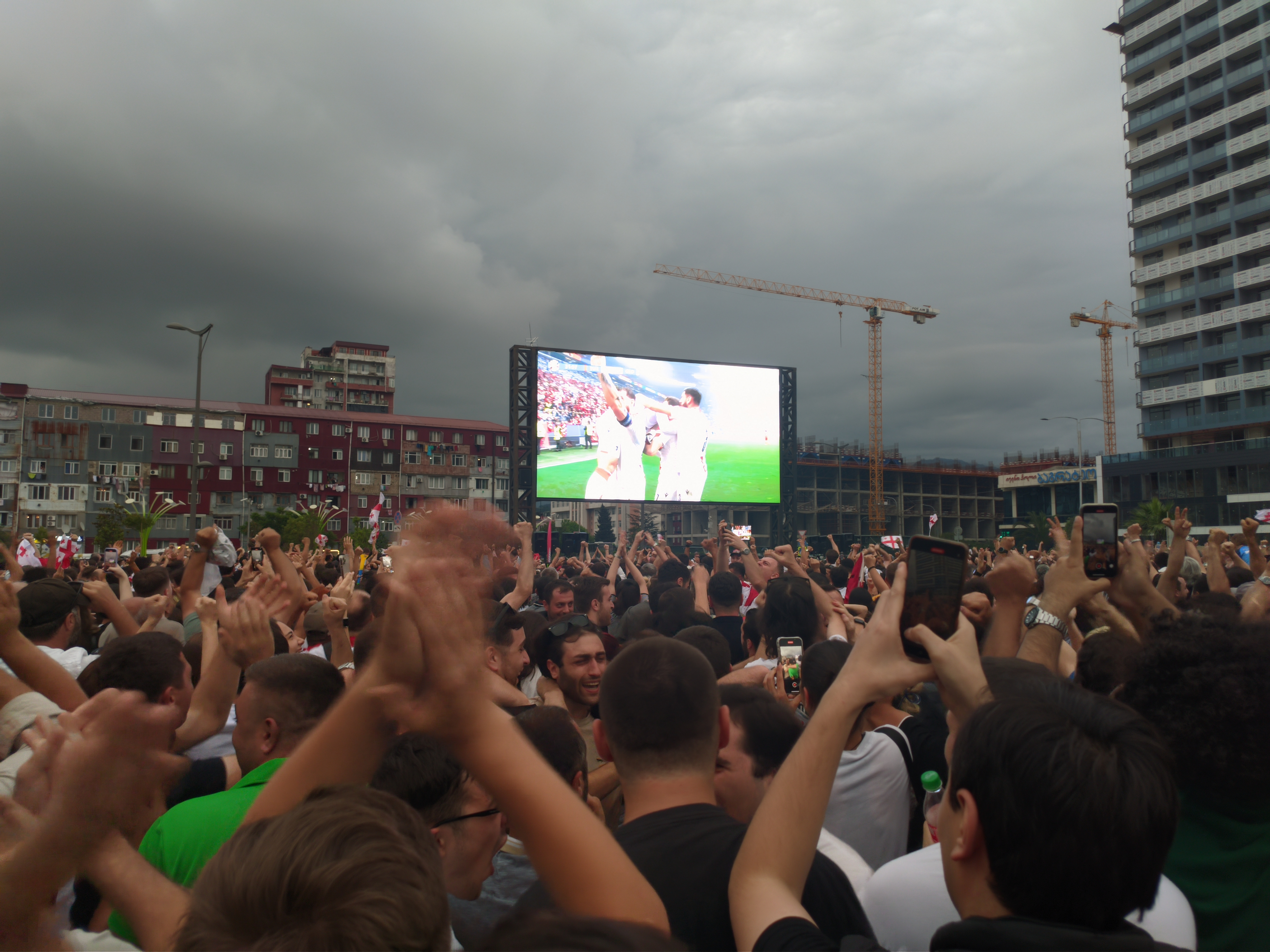
Georgian fans in the Batumi fan zone celebrating their first goal vs Turkey in Euro 2024, their first goal in the history of the tournament.

In June 2016, Georgia beat the two-time reigning European champions Spain 1–0 in their final pre-Euro 2016 friendly.

In 2018, they were the first team to earn promotion in the new UEFA Nations League. They scored the event's first goal in a UEFA Nations League D game in Kazakhstan before beating Latvia twice and Andorra, with two games still to spare and earned their first-ever playoff berth. In the UEFA Euro 2020 qualifying, Georgia had a disappointing run, with their only two wins came over Gibraltar. In the Path D playoff semi-final, Georgia managed to beat Belarus 1–0 and thus the hope to qualify for UEFA Euro 2020 increased, but it went in vain after the Georgians suffered a heartbreaking home defeat to North Macedonia in the decisive match and thus missed the opportunity to make a historic debut in a major competition.

Starting lineup in Georgia's 2–0 win against Portugal at UEFA Euro 2024.

Georgia showed improvements with a strong 2–0 win over Sweden at the 2022 World Cup qualification on 11 November 2021. They continued their improvement by winning the 2022–23 UEFA Nations League C Group 4, getting promoted to 2024-25 UEFA Nations League B, and qualified for their second-ever play-off berth. Georgia won 2–0 against Luxembourg, earning them a spot in the final of the UEFA Euro 2024 qualifying play-offs. They defeated Greece 4–2 on penalties after a 0–0 draw in the playoff final, which guaranteed Georgia's qualification for their first ever international tournament at Euro 2024.

During Euro 2024, Georgia were placed in Group F; they subsequently lost 3–1 in the match against Turkey, where Georges Mikautadze scored the first-ever goal in Georgia's history in the Euros, and drew 1–1 against the Czech Republic. Their 2–0 victory against Portugal was considered one of the biggest upsets in European Championship history, and was enough to propel Georgia to the round of 16 in their first international tournament appearance. Georgia subsequently played eventual Champions Spain in the Round of 16, and lost by a score of 4–1. Georges Mikautadze finished the Euro 2024 campaign as the joint-UEFA European Football Championship Top Goalscorer.

== Results and fixtures ==
The following is a list of match results in the last 12 months, as well as any future matches that have been scheduled.

Win Draw Loss Fixture

=== 2026 ===
26 March Friendly	Georgia	2–2	Israel	Tbilisi, Georgia
20:00 UTC+4	Kvaratskhelia 36', 54'	Report	Mizrahi 60'; Gandelman 64'	Stadium: Mikheil Meskhi Stadium; Attendance: 16,556; Referee: Julian Weinberger (Austria)

29 March Friendly	Lithuania	0–2	Georgia	Kaunas, Lithuania
16:00 UTC+3		Report	Mikautadze 70' (pen.), 84'	Stadium: Darius and Girėnas Stadium; Attendance: 7,726; Referee: Vitālijs Spasjoņņikovs (Latvia)

2 June Friendly	Georgia	1–1	Romania	Tbilisi, Georgia
21:00 UTC+4	Kvilitaia 46'	Report	Munteanu 55'	Stadium: Mikheil Meskhi Stadium; Attendance: 14,702; Referee: Mohammed Al Mazeed (Qatar)

5 June Friendly	Georgia	2–0	Bahrain	Tbilisi, Georgia
20:00 UTC+4	Lochoshvili 52'; Kvaratskhelia 77' (pen.)	Report		Stadium: Mikheil Meskhi Stadium; Attendance: 10,997; Referee: Duncan Nicolson (Scotland)

25 September 2026–27 UEFA Nations League	Georgia	0–1	Northern Ireland	Tbilisi, Georgia
20:00 UTC+4		Report	Charles 90+9'	Stadium: Boris Paichadze Dinamo Arena; Attendance: 7,470 (Note: The match was held behind closed doors, but was only attended by football school players aged 10–14 (boys and girls), who received free tickets.); Referee: Orel Grinfeeld (Israel)

28 September 2026–27 UEFA Nations League	Georgia	0–0	Ukraine	Tbilisi, Georgia
20:00 UTC+4		Report		Stadium: Boris Paichadze Dinamo Arena; Attendance: 43,382; Referee: Aliyar Aghayev (Azerbaijan)

2 October 2026–27 UEFA Nations League	Hungary	1–0	Georgia	Budapest, Hungary
20:45 UTC+2	Kerkez 35'	Report		Stadium: Puskás Aréna; Attendance: 52,870; Referee: Srđan Jovanović (Serbia)

5 October 2026–27 UEFA Nations League	Northern Ireland	0–0	Georgia	Belfast, Northern Ireland
19:45 UTC+1		Report		Stadium: Windsor Park; Attendance: 18,140; Referee: Sebastian Gishamer (Austria)

14 November 2026–27 UEFA Nations League	Georgia	0–2	Hungary	Tbilisi, Georgia
21:00 UTC+4		Report	Dvali 73' (o.g.); Varga 85'	Stadium: Mikheil Meskhi Stadium; Attendance: 19,187; Referee: Ondřej Berka (Czech Republic)

17 November 2026–27 UEFA Nations League	Ukraine	1–0	Georgia	Košice, Slovakia (Note: Due to the Russian invasion of Ukraine, Ukraine are required to play their home matches at neutral venues until further notice.)
20:45 UTC+2	Sikan 1'	Report		Stadium: Košická futbalová aréna Attendance: 5,400; Referee: Martin Matoša (Slovenia)

== Coaching staff ==
As of 29 September 2026

Position	Name
Manager	(Georgia (country)) Ramaz Svanadze
Assistant Manager	(Georgia (country)) Giorgi Dekanosidze (Georgia (country)) Nika Kvekveskiri
Coach	(Georgia (country)) Guram Kashia
Goalkeeping Coach	(Georgia (country)) Davit Gvaramadze
Physical Fitness Trainer	(Georgia (country)) Bondo Gotsiridze
Analyst	(Georgia (country)) Irakli Chitauri (Georgia (country)) Levan Zamtaradze

=== Coaching history ===
As of 18 November 2026

No.	Manager	Georgia career	Played	Won	Drawn	Lost	Win %
1	(Georgian Soviet Socialist Republic) Givi Nodia	1990	1	0	1	0	0.00
2	(Georgia (country)) Giga Norakidze	1991–1992	4	2	0	2	50.00
3	(Georgia (country)) Aleksandre Chivadze	1993–1996	24	9	1	14	37.50
−	(Georgia (country)) Vladimir Gutsaev (caretaker)	1996	2	0	0	2	0.00
4	(Georgia (country)) David Kipiani	1997	7	4	1	2	57.14
5	(Georgia (country)) Vladimir Gutsaev	1998	13	5	3	5	38.46
−	(Georgia (country)) Gigla Imnadze (caretaker)	1998	1	0	0	1	0.00
6	(Netherlands) Johan Boskamp	1999	5	0	1	4	0.00
7	(Georgia (country)) David Kipiani / (Georgia (country)) Revaz Dzodzuashvili	2000–2001	16	5	5	6	31.25
8	(Georgia (country)) Aleksandre Chivadze	2001–2003	11	4	3	4	36.36
9	(Croatia) Ivo Šušak	2003	2	1	0	1	50.00
10	(Georgia (country)) Merab Jordania	2003	3	1	0	2	33.33
−	(Georgia (country)) Gocha Tkebuchava (caretaker)	2004	3	0	0	3	0.00
11	(France) Alain Giresse	2004–2005	10	2	2	6	20.00
−	(Georgia (country)) Gaioz Darsadze (caretaker)	2005	7	2	2	3	28.57
12	(Germany) Klaus Toppmöller	2006–2008	24	7	4	13	29.17
−	(Croatia) Petar Šegrt (caretaker)	2008	2	0	1	1	0.00
13	(Argentina) Héctor Cúper	2008–2009	16	1	4	11	6.25
14	(Georgia (country)) Temur Ketsbaia	2010–2014	40	13	9	18	32.50
15	(Georgia (country)) Kakhaber Tskhadadze	2014–2016	10	3	1	6	30.00
16	(Slovakia) Vladimír Weiss	2016–2020	47	16	15	16	34.04
−	(Georgia (country)) Ramaz Svanadze (caretaker)	2020	1	0	1	0	0.00
17	(France) Willy Sagnol	2021–2026	57	24	10	23	42.11
18	(Georgia (country)) Ramaz Svanadze	2026–	5	0	2	3	0.00

== Players ==
=== Current squad ===
The following players were called up for the 2026–27 UEFA Nations League B matches against Hungary and Ukraine on November 14 and 17.

On November 9, Nika Gagnidze was added to the team.

Information correct as of 18 November 2026, after the match against Ukraine.

No.	Pos.	Player	Date of birth (age)	Caps	Goals	Club
1	GK	Giorgi Mamardashvili	29 September 2000 (age 26)	44	0	(The Football Association) Liverpool
13	GK	Nodari Kalichava	24 November 2000 (age 25)	0	0	(Georgian Football Federation) Dinamo Batumi
23	GK	Luka Gugeshashvili	29 April 1999 (age 27)	3	0	(Turkish Football Federation) Göztepe
2	DF	Otar Kakabadze	27 June 1995 (age 31)	83	0	(Polish Football Association) Cracovia
3	DF	Lasha Dvali	14 May 1995 (age 31)	53	1	(Bulgarian Football Union) CSKA 1948
4	DF	Luka Lochoshvili	29 May 1998 (age 28)	38	4	(German Football Association) 1. FC Köln
5	DF	Saba Goglichidze	25 June 2004 (age 22)	15	0	(Italian Football Federation) Monza
12	DF	Giorgi Maisuradze	31 January 2002 (age 24)	1	0	(Ukrainian Association of Football) Polissya Zhytomyr
15	DF	Saba Sazonov	2 January 2002 (age 24)	4	0	(Royal Spanish Football Federation) Getafe
16	DF	Irakli Azarovi	21 February 2002 (age 24)	27	0	(Ukrainian Association of Football) Shakhtar Donetsk
19	DF	Iva Gelashvili	8 April 2001 (age 25)	5	0	(Romanian Football Federation) CFR Cluj
21	DF	Jemal Tabidze	18 March 1996 (age 30)	16	1	(Turkish Football Federation) Kayserispor
6	MF	Giorgi Kochorashvili	29 June 1999 (age 27)	31	4	(Royal Spanish Football Federation) Sevilla
7	MF	Zuriko Davitashvili	15 February 2001 (age 25)	60	7	(French Football Federation) Saint-Étienne
8	MF	Giorgi Moistsrapishvili	29 September 2001 (age 25)	1	0	(Slovak Football Association) Spartak Trnava
10	MF	Giorgi Chakvetadze	29 August 1999 (age 27)	45	10	(Italian Football Federation) Udinese
14	MF	Anzor Mekvabishvili	5 June 2001 (age 25)	38	0	(United States Soccer Federation) Chicago Fire
18	MF	Irakli Yegoian	19 March 2004 (age 22)	7	0	(Royal Dutch Football Association) Excelsior
20	MF	Nika Gagnidze	20 March 2001 (age 25)	11	1	(Ukrainian Association of Football) Kolos Kovalivka
	MF	Giorgi Tsitaishvili	18 November 2000 (age 26)	34	1	(Royal Spanish Football Federation) Rayo Vallecano
	MF	Nodar Lominadze	4 April 2002 (age 24)	2	0	(Georgian Football Federation) Torpedo Kutaisi
9	FW	Giorgi Gagua	10 October 2001 (age 25)	1	0	(Slovak Football Association) Dunajská Streda
11	FW	Budu Zivzivadze	10 March 1994 (age 32)	47	8	(German Football Association) 1. FC Heidenheim
17	FW	Giorgi Kvernadze	7 February 2003 (age 23)	11	0	(Italian Football Federation) Frosinone
22	FW	Georges Mikautadze	31 October 2000 (age 26)	49	23	(Royal Spanish Football Federation) Villarreal
	FW	Giorgi Guliashvili	5 September 2001 (age 25)	8	0	(Royal Spanish Football Federation) Racing Santander

=== Recent call-ups ===
The following players have been called up to the national team in the past 12 months but are not part of the current squad.

Pos.	Player	Date of birth (age)	Caps	Goals	Club	Latest call-up
GK	Davit Kereselidze	19 August 1999 (age 27)	2	0	(Georgia (country)) Dila Gori	v. Northern Ireland, 5 October 2026
DF	Ilia Beriashvili	9 July 1998 (age 28)	5	0	(Hungary) MTK Budapest	v. Northern Ireland, 5 October 2026
DF	Saba Kharebashvili	3 September 2008 (age 18)	3	0	(Turkey) İstanbul Başakşehir	v. Northern Ireland, 5 October 2026
DF	Luka Gadrani	12 April 1997 (age 29)	2	0	(Israel) Beitar Jerusalem	v. Bahrain, 5 June 2026
DF	Guram Kashia ^{RET}	4 July 1987 (age 39)	129	3	Retired	v. Romania, 2 June 2026
DF	Giorgi Gocholeishvili	14 February 2001 (age 25)	20	0	(Spain) Cádiz	v. Lithuania, 29 March 2026
MF	Sandro Altunashvili	19 May 1997 (age 29)	8	0	(Georgia (country)) Dinamo Batumi	v. Hungary, 14 November 2026 ^{WD}
MF	Saba Lobzhanidze	18 December 1994 (age 31)	42	4	(United States) Real Salt Lake	v. Northern Ireland, 5 October 2026
MF	Vladimer Mamuchashvili	29 August 1997 (age 29)	16	0	(Georgia (country)) Torpedo Kutaisi	v. Northern Ireland, 5 October 2026
MF	Gizo Mamageishvili	15 January 2003 (age 23)	5	0	(Austria) Sturm Graz	v. Northern Ireland, 5 October 2026
MF	Giorgi Abuashvili	8 February 2003 (age 23)	2	0	(France) Metz	v. Northern Ireland, 5 October 2026
MF	Otar Kiteishvili	26 March 1996 (age 30)	57	4	(Austria) Sturm Graz	v. Northern Ireland, 5 October 2026 ^{INJ}
MF	Otar Mamageishvili	15 January 2003 (age 23)	0	0	(Austria) Wolfsberger	v. Northern Ireland, 25 September 2026 ^{INJ}
FW	Khvicha Kvaratskhelia	12 February 2001 (age 25)	54	23	(France) Paris Saint-Germain	v. Northern Ireland, 5 October 2026
FW	Giorgi Kvilitaia	1 October 1993 (age 33)	44	7	(Germany) Holstein Kiel	v. Bahrain, 5 June 2026
^{INJ} Player withdrew from the squad due to injury; ^{WD} Player withdrew from the squad due to a non-injury issue; ^{RET} Player retired from the national team

== Individual records ==
As of 17 November 2026
Players in bold are still active with Georgia.

=== Most appearances ===
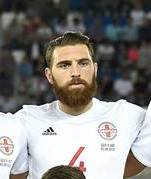
Guram Kashia is Georgia's most capped player with 129 appearances.

Rank	Player	Caps	Goals	Career
1	Guram Kashia	129	3	2009–2026
2	Jaba Kankava	101	10	2004–2024
3	Levan Kobiashvili	100	12	1996–2011
4	Zurab Khizanishvili	92	1	1999–2015
5	**Otar Kakabadze**	83	0	2015–present
5	Kakha Kaladze	83	1	1996–2011
7	Giorgi Loria	79	0	2008–2025
8	Giorgi Nemsadze	69	0	1992–2004
9	Aleksandre Iashvili	67	15	1996–2011
10	Valeri Qazaishvili	62	13	2014–2022

=== Top goalscorers ===
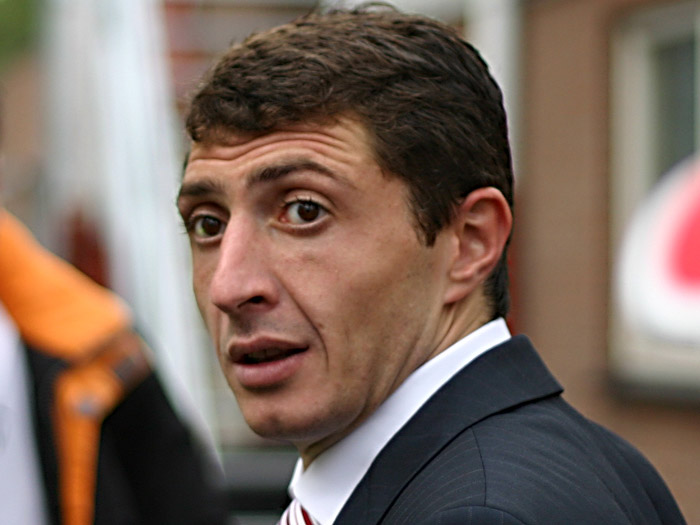
Shota Arveladze is Georgia's top scorer with 26 goals.

Rank	Player	Goals	Caps	Ratio	Career
1	Shota Arveladze	26	61	0.43	1992–2007
2	**Georges Mikautadze**	23	49	0.47	2021–present
2	**Khvicha Kvaratskhelia**	23	54	0.43	2019–present
4	Temur Ketsbaia	17	52	0.33	1990–2003
5	Aleksandre Iashvili	15	67	0.22	1996–2011
6	Tornike Okriashvili	13	50	0.26	2010–2021
6	Valeri Qazaishvili	13	62	0.21	2014–2022
8	Giorgi Demetradze	12	56	0.21	1996–2007
8	Levan Kobiashvili	12	100	0.12	1996–2011
10	**Giorgi Chakvetadze**	10	45	0.22	2018–present
10	Jaba Kankava	10	101	0.1	2004–2024

== Georgia records and statistics ==
- Most consecutive failed qualification attempts FIFA World Cup: 8 - 1998-present
- Largest blown lead to lose the match: 2 - v Lebanon, 5 December 1996
- Oldest Georgia player: 39 years and 129 days - Giorgi Loria - v Faroe Islands, 5 June 2025
- Youngest Georgia player: 16 years and 275 days - Saba Kharebashvili - v Faroe Islands, 5 June 2025
- Georgia player sent off: - (15 times)
  - Kakhaber Tskhadadze v Portugal, 15 November 1995 (40th minutes)
  - Kakha Kaladze and Georgi Kinkladze v Moldova, 24 September 1997 (60th and 70th minutes)
  - Mikhail Kavelashvili v Poland, 11 October 1997 (80th minutes)
  - Zaza Janashia v Albania, 5 September 1998 (80th minutes)
  - Mamuka Tsereteli v Latvia, 8 September 1999 (80th minutes)
  - Aleksandre Rekhviashvili v Hungary, 1 September 2001 (65th minutes)
  - Gogita Gogua v Turkey, 30 March 2005 (83rd minutes)
  - Jaba Kankava v Italy, 11 October 2006 (60th minutes)
  - Levan Khmaladze v Bulgaria, 14 October 2009 (56th minutes)
  - Valerian Gvilia v Malta, 1 June 2018 (53rd minutes)
  - Levan Shengelia v Spain, 28 March 2021 (94th minutes)
  - Saba Kvirkvelia v Romania, 2 June 2021 (64th minutes)
  - Irakli Azarov v Uzbekistan, 15 November 2021 (84th minutes)
  - Giorgi Loria v Greece, 26 March 2024 (45th minutes)
- Longest winning streak: 5 - from 24 September 1997 to 10 February 1998
- Longest unbeaten streak: 11 - from 12 October 2021 to 26 September 2022
- Longest winless streak: 15 - from 6 September 2008 to 14 October 2009
- Longest losing streak: 7 - (2 times)
  - from 24 April 1996 to 8 December 1996
  - from 10 September 2003 to 18 August 2004
- Longest streak without draw: 22 - from 7 September 1994 to 14 June 1997
- Longest goalless streak: 422 minutes - from 5 June 2013 to 5 March 2014
- Longest clean sheet streak: 554 minutes - from 12 October 2021 to 5 June 2022
- Longest goalless streak by both teams: 200 minutes - from 29 March 2000 to 11 June 2000
- Biggest wins: 8 - v Thailand, 12 October 2023
- Biggest defeat: 6 - v Spain, 8 September 2023
- First match played: v Lithuania, 2 September 1992
- First goals scored: - Davit Kizilashvili - v Azerbaijan, 17 September 1992
- Georgia biggest upset win: -68 FIFA World Ranking - v Portugal, 26 June 2024
- Most appearances: 129 - Guram Kashia - from 1 April 2009 to 2 June 2026
- Most appearances by a goalkeeper: 79 - Giorgi Loria - from 27 May 2008 to 5 June 2025
- Top goalscorer: 26 - Shota Arveladze - from 2 September 1992 to 24 March 2007
- Most assists: 12 - Gocha Jamarauli - 1994-2004
- Most clean sheet: 27 - Giorgi Loria - from 27 May 2008 to 5 June 2025
- Most goals by a player in a match: 4 - Georges Mikautadze - v Thailand, 12 October 2023
- Most goals by a opponent player in a match: 3 - (4 times)
  - Viorel Moldovan v Romania, 24 April 1996
  - Dimitar Berbatov v Bulgaria, 14 October 2009
  - Robert Lewandowski v Poland, 13 June 2015
  - Álvaro Morata v Spain, 8 September 2023
- Most goals in a match: 8 - v Thailand, 12 October 2023
- Most goals in second half: 5 - (2 times)
  - v Azerbaijan, 17 September 1992
  - v Armenia, 30 March 1997
- Most goals conceded in a match: 7 - v Spain, 8 September 2023
- Most goals conceded in first half: 6 - v Bulgaria, 14 October 2009
- Most goals conceded in second half: 4 - (3 times)
  - v Lebanon, 5 December 1996
  - v Poland, 14 November 2014
  - v Poland, 13 June 2015
- Most goals by both teams in a match: 9 - v Azerbaijan, 17 September 1992
- Most goals by both teams in first half: 7 - v Bulgaria, 14 October 2009
- Most goals by both teams in second half: 7 - v Azerbaijan, 17 September 1992
- Fewest goals by both teams in a match: 0 - (21 times) - last matches played: - v Greece, 26 March 2024
- Fastest goals: 1st minutes - (2 times)
  - Shota Arveladze - v Bulgaria, 11 October 1995
  - 46 seconds - Aleksandr Iashvili - v Republic of Ireland, 11 February 2009
- Fastest goals conceded: 1st minutes - Serhiy Rebrov - v Ukraine, 19 August 1998
- Fastest 2 goals to start the match: 12th minutes - v Thailand, 12 October 2023
- Fastest 2 goals conceded to start the match: 3rd minutes - v Romania, 3 June 2016

=== UEFA European Championship records and statistics ===
- Most consecutive failed qualification attempts: 7 - 1996-2020
- Longest unbeaten streak: 2 - from 22 June 2024 to 26 June 2024
- Longest goalless streak: 112 minutes - from 18 June 2024 to 22 June 2024
- Longest clean sheet streak: 159 minutes - from 22 June 2024 to 30 June 2024
- Longest goalless streak by both teams: 55 minutes - v Portugal, 26 June 2024
- Top goalscorer: 3 - Georges Mikautadze - 2024
- Most clean sheet: 1 - Giorgi Mamardashvili - 2024
- Oldest Georgia player: 36 years and 362 days - Guram Kashia - v Spain, 30 June 2024
- Youngest Georgia player: 23 years and 13 days - Anzor Mekvabishvili - v Turkey, 18 June 2024
- Most Man of the Match: 1 - (2 times)
  - Giorgi Mamardashvili - 2024
  - Khvicha Kvaratskhelia - 2024
- Biggest win: 2 - v Portugal, 26 June 2024
- Biggest defeat: 3 - v Spain, 30 June 2024
- Georgia biggest upset win: -68 FIFA World Ranking - v Portugal, 26 June 2024
- Most goals by a player in a match: 1 - (5 times)
  - Georges Mikautadze v Turkey, 18 June 2024
  - Georges Mikautadze v Czech Republic, 22 June 2024
  - Khvicha Kvaratskhelia - v Portugal, 26 June 2024
  - Georges Mikautadze v Portugal, 26 June 2024
  - Robin Le Normand v Spain, 30 June 2024 (own goal)
- Most goals by a player in first half: 1 - (4 times)
  - Georges Mikautadze v Turkey, 18 June 2024
  - Georges Mikautadze v Czech Republic, 22 June 2024
  - Khvicha Kvaratskhelia - v Portugal, 26 June 2024
  - Robin Le Normand v Spain, 30 June 2024 (own goal)
- Most goals by a player in second half: 1 - Georges Mikautadze v Portugal, 26 June 2024
- Most goals by a opponent player in a match: 1 - (8 times)
  - Mert Müldür v Turkey, 18 June 2024
  - Arda Güler v Turkey, 18 June 2024
  - Kerem Aktürkoğlu v Turkey, 18 June 2024
  - Patrik Schick v Czech Republic, 22 June 2024
  - Rodri v Spain, 30 June 2024
  - Fabián Ruiz v Spain, 30 June 2024
  - Nico Williams v Spain, 30 June 2024
  - Dani Olmo v Spain, 30 June 2024
- Most goals by a opponent player in first half: 1 - (2 times)
  - Mert Müldür v Turkey, 18 June 2024
  - Rodri v Spain, 30 June 2024
- Most goals by a opponent player in a match: 1 - (6 times)
  - Arda Güler v Turkey, 18 June 2024
  - Kerem Aktürkoğlu v Turkey, 18 June 2024
  - Patrik Schick v Czech Republic, 22 June 2024
  - Fabián Ruiz v Spain, 30 June 2024
  - Nico Williams v Spain, 30 June 2024
  - Dani Olmo v Spain, 30 June 2024
- Most goals by a opponent substitutions player in a match: 1 - (2 times)
  - Kerem Aktürkoğlu v Turkey, 18 June 2024
  - Dani Olmo v Spain, 30 June 2024
- Most goals in a match: 2 - v Portugal, 26 June 2024
- Most goals in first half: 1 - (4 times)
  - v Turkey, 18 June 2024
  - v Czech Republic, 22 June 2024
  - v Portugal, 26 June 2024
  - v Spain, 30 June 2024
- Most goals in second half: 1 - v Portugal, 26 June 2024
- Most goals conceded in a match: 4 - v Spain, 30 June 2024
- Most goals conceded in first half: 1 - (2 times)
  - v Turkey, 18 June 2024
  - v Spain, 30 June 2024
- Most goals conceded in second half: 3 - v Spain, 30 June 2024
- Most goals by both teams in a match: 5 - v Spain, 30 June 2024
- Most goals by both teams in first half: 2 - (2 times)
  - v Turkey, 18 June 2024
  - v Spain, 30 June 2024
- Most goals by both teams in second half: 3 - v Spain, 30 June 2024
- Fewest goals by both teams in a match: 2 - (2 times)
  - v Czech Republic, 22 June 2024
  - v Portugal, 26 June 2024
- Fastest goals: 92 seconds - Khvicha Kvaratskhelia - v Portugal, 26 June 2024
- Fastest goals by a opponent: 25th minutes - Mert Müldür - v Turkey, 18 June 2024
- Most saves in a match: 10 - Giorgi Mamardashvili - v Czech Republic, 22 June 2024
- Most saves in one half: 7 - Giorgi Mamardashvili - v Czech Republic, 22 June 2024 (1st half)
- Most saves by a opponent in a match: 3 - Mert Günok - v Turkey, 18 June 2024
- Most saves by a opponent in one half: 2 - Mert Günok - v Turkey, 18 June 2024 (1st half)
- Most yellow cards in a match: 4 - v Czech Republic, 22 June 2024
- Most yellow cards in first half: 1 - v Czech Republic, 22 June 2024
- Most yellow cards in second half: 3 - v Czech Republic, 22 June 2024
- Most yellow cards by a opponent in a match: 5 - v Czech Republic, 22 June 2024
- Most yellow cards by a opponent in first half: 2 - v Czech Republic, 22 June 2024
- Most yellow cards by a opponent in second half: 3 - v Czech Republic, 22 June 2024
- Most yellow cards by both teams in a match: 9 - v Czech Republic, 22 June 2024
- Most yellow cards by both teams in first half: 3 - v Czech Republic, 22 June 2024
- Most yellow cards by both teams in second half: 6 - v Czech Republic, 22 June 2024
- Fewest yellow cards by both teams in a match: 2 - v Spain, 30 June 2024
- Most shots in a match: 15 - v Turkey, 18 June 2024
- Most shots in one half: 9 - v Turkey, 18 June 2024 (2nd half)
- Fewest shots in a match: 4 - v Spain, 30 June 2024
- Fewest shots in one half: 2 - (3 times)
  - v Czech Republic, 22 June 2024 (1st half)
  - v Spain, 30 June 2024 (1st and 2nd half)
- Most shots allowed in a match: 37 - v Spain, 30 June 2024
- Most shots allowed in a match: 19 - v Spain, 30 June 2024 (2nd half)
- Fewest shots allowed in a match: 22 - v Turkey, 18 June 2024
- Fewest shots allowed in one half: 11 - (3 times)
  - v Turkey, 18 June 2024 (1st and 2nd half)
  - v Portugal, 26 June 2024 (1st half)
- Most shots by both teams in a match: 40 - v Spain, 30 June 2024
- Fewest shots by both teams in a match: 30 - v Portugal, 26 June 2024
- Most shots by both teams in one half: 21 - v Spain, 30 June 2024 (2nd half)
- Fewest shots by both teams in one half: 14 - v Portugal, 26 June 2024 (1st half)
- Most shots on target in a match: 4 - v Turkey, 18 June 2024
- Most shots on target in one half: 3 - v Turkey, 18 June 2024 (1st half)
- Fewest shots on target in a match: 0 - v Spain, 30 June 2024
- Fewest shots on target in one half: 0 - (3 times)
  - v Czech Republic, 22 June 2024 (2nd half)
  - v Spain, 30 June 2024 (1st and 2nd half)
- Most shots on target by a opponent in a match: 13 - v Spain, 30 June 2024
- Most shots on target by a opponent in one half: 7 - (2 times)
  - v Czech Republic, 22 June 2024 (1st half)
  - v Spain, 30 June 2024 (2nd half)
- Fewest shots on target by a opponent in a match: 5 - v Portugal, 26 June 2024
- Fewest shots on target by a opponent in one half: 2 - v Portugal, 26 June 2024 (1st half)
- Most shots on target by both teams in a match: 13 - v Spain, 30 June 2024
- Fewest shots on target by both teams in a match: 8 - v Portugal, 26 June 2024
- Most shots on target by both teams in one half: 8 - v Czech Republic, 22 June 2024 (1st half)
- Fewest shots on target by both teams in one half: 4 - (3 times)
  - v Czech Republic, 22 June 2024 (1st half)
  - v Portugal, 26 June 2024 (1st and 2nd half)
- Most corners in a match: 5 - (2 times)
  - v Turkey, 18 June 2024
  - v Czech Republic, 22 June 2024
- Most corners in one half: 4 v Czech Republic, 22 June 2024
- Fewest corners in a match: 1 - v Portugal, 26 June 2024
- Fewest corners in one half: 0 - v Portugal, 26 June 2024 (1st half)
- Most corners by a opponent in a match: 13 - v Spain, 30 June 2024
- Most corners by a opponent in one half: 9 - v Spain, 30 June 2024 (1st half)
- Fewest corners by a opponent in a match: 5 - v Turkey, 18 June 2024
- Fewest corners by a opponent in one half: 2 - v Turkey, 18 June 2024 (2nd half)
- Most corners by both teams in a match: 16 - (2 times)
  - v Czech Republic, 22 June 2024
  - v Spain, 30 June 2024
- Most corners by both teams in one half: 10 - v Spain, 30 June 2024
- Fewest corners by both teams in one half: 5 - (3 times)
  - v Turkey, 18 June 2024 (1st and 2nd half)
  - v Portugal, 26 June 2024 (1st half)
- Most offside in a match: 1 - v Turkey, 18 June 2024
- Most offside by a opponent in a match: 3 - v Spain, 30 June 2024
- Most offside by both teams in a match: 3 - (2 times)
  - v Turkey, 18 June 2024
  - v Spain, 30 June 2024
- Most offside by both teams in one half: 2 - (2 times)
  - v Turkey, 18 June 2024 (1st half)
  - v Spain, 30 June 2024 (1st half)
- Fewest offside by both teams in a match: 1 - (2 times)
  - v Czech Republic, 22 June 2024
  - v Portugal, 26 June 2024

== Competitive record ==
=== FIFA World Cup ===
FIFA World Cup record									Qualification record						
Year	Round	Position	Pld	W	D	L	GF	GA	Pld	W	D	L	GF	GA	Position
(Uruguay) 1930 to (Italy) 1990	Part of the Soviet Union (Note: A total of 14 Georgian players were included in the squads for five of the Soviet Union's seven appearances at the FIFA World Cup: Slava Metreveli (1962, 1966, 1970), Anzor Kavazashvili (1966, 1970), Murtaz Khurtsilava (1966, 1970), Aleksandr Chivadze (1982, 1986), Givi Chokheli (1962), Sergey Kotrikadze (1962), Mikhail Meskhi (1962), Georgi Sichinava (1966), Kakhi Asatiani (1970), Revaz Dzodzuashvili (1970), Givi Nodia (1970), Vitaly Daraselia (1982), Tengiz Sulakvelidze (1982) and Ramaz Shengelia (1982). There were no Georgian players in the squads of 1958 and 1990.)								Part of the Soviet Union						
(United States) 1994	FIFA member from 1992. Not admitted to the tournament. (Note: FIFA adopted a decision not to allow the national teams of those former Soviet republics that did not participate in the qualification draw on 8 December 1991 to participate in the 1994 FIFA World Cup. A proposition by Ukraine, supported by Georgia and Armenia, to arrange a separate tournament for all successor states of the Soviet Union was blocked by Russia.)								Not admitted to the tournament						
(France) 1998	Did not qualify								8	3	1	4	7	9	4/5
(South Korea) (Japan) 2002	Did not qualify								8	3	1	4	12	12	3/5
(Germany) 2006	Did not qualify								12	2	4	6	14	25	6/7
(South Africa) 2010	Did not qualify								10	0	3	7	7	19	6/6
(Brazil) 2014	Did not qualify								8	1	2	5	3	10	4/5
(Russia) 2018	Did not qualify								10	0	5	5	8	14	5/6
(Qatar) 2022	Did not qualify								8	2	1	5	6	12	4/5
(Canada) (Mexico) (United States) 2026	Did not qualify								6	1	0	5	7	15	3/4
(Morocco) (Portugal) (Spain) 2030	To be determined								To be determined						
(Saudi Arabia) 2034	To be determined								To be determined						
Total		0/8							70	12	17	41	64	116	—

=== UEFA European Championship ===
UEFA European Championship record										Qualification record						
Year	Round	Position	Pld	W	D	L	GF	GA	Squad	Pld	W	D	L	GF	GA	Position
(France) 1960 to (Sweden) 1992	Part of the Soviet Union									Part of the Soviet Union						
(England) 1996	Did not qualify									10	5	0	5	14	13	3/6
(Belgium) (Netherlands) 2000	Did not qualify									10	1	2	7	8	18	6/6
(Portugal) 2004	Did not qualify									8	2	1	5	8	14	5/5
(Austria) (Switzerland) 2008	Did not qualify									12	3	1	8	16	19	6/7
(Poland) (Ukraine) 2012	Did not qualify									10	2	4	4	7	9	5/6
(France) 2016	Did not qualify									10	3	0	7	10	16	5/6
(Europe) 2020	Did not qualify									10	3	2	5	8	12	4/5 (PO runners-up)
(Germany) 2024	Round of 16	15th	4	1	1	2	5	8	Squad	10	3	3	4	14	18	4/5 (PO winners)
(England) (Scotland) (Republic of Ireland) (Wales) 2028	To be determined									To be determined						
(Italy) (Turkey) 2032	To be determined									To be determined						
Total	Round of 16	1/8	4	1	1	2	5	8	—	80	22	13	45	85	119	—

=== UEFA Nations League ===
UEFA Nations League record
Season	League	Group	Pos	Pld	W	D	L	GF	GA	P/R	RK
2018–19	D	1	1st	6	5	1	0	12	2	▲	40th
2020–21	C	2	3rd	6	1	4	1	6	6	Same position	42nd
2022–23	C	4	1st	6	5	1	0	16	3	▲	33rd
2024–25	B	1	3rd	6	2	1	3	7	6	Same position	26th
2024–25	B	Relegation play-off	Winners	2	2	0	0	9	1	Same position	26th
2026–27	B	2	4th	6	0	2	4	0	5	TBD	31st
2026–27	B	Relegation play-off	TBD	0	0	0	0	0	0	TBD	31st
Total				32	15	9	8	50	23	26th	

== Statistics ==
The following tables show Georgia's all-time international record, correct as of 5 October 2026.

Tournament	Play	Win	Draw	Lost	Goals for	Goals Against
World Cup Qualifying	70	12	17	41	64	118
Euro Qualifying	80	22	13	45	85	119
European Championship	4	1	1	2	5	8
UEFA Nations League	29	13	8	8	50	20
Friendly	130	52	27	51	186	173

Opponents	Play	Win	Draw	Lost	Goals for	Goals Against
Albania	16	9	4	4	24	14
Andorra	2	1	1	0	4	1
Armenia	9	5	2	2	23	9
Austria	2	0	1	1	2	3
Azerbaijan	6	2	2	1	8	6
Bahrain	1	1	0	0	2	0
Belarus	4	2	1	1	4	4
Bosnia and Herzegovina	1	1	0	0	1	0
Bulgaria	10	3	2	5	16	23
Cameroon	1	0	1	0	0	0
Cape Verde	1	0	1	0	1	1
Croatia	3	1	0	2	3	4
Cyprus	8	4	1	3	12	8
Czech Republic	3	1	1	1	6	4
Denmark	5	0	2	3	5	15
Egypt	1	0	1	0	0	0
England	2	0	0	2	0	4
Estonia	8	4	2	2	9	7
Faroe Islands	3	3	0	0	10	1
Finland	2	0	1	1	1	2
France	4	0	1	3	1	7
Germany	5	0	0	5	2	12
Gibraltar	6	6	0	0	19	3
Greece	10	0	3	7	6	17
Hungary	4	1	0	3	4	8
Iceland	1	0	0	1	1	3
Iran	1	0	0	1	1	2
Republic of Ireland	11	0	2	9	5	18
Israel	7	1	3	3	6	9
Italy	8	0	1	7	2	14
Jordan	2	1	0	1	3	3
Kazakhstan	6	3	2	1	7	4
Kosovo	2	1	0	1	2	2
Latvia	10	5	2	3	18	10
Lebanon	2	0	0	2	4	7
Liechtenstein	1	1	0	0	2	0
Lithuania	9	5	1	3	15	6
Luxembourg	5	3	1	1	7	2
Malta	9	6	2	1	12	5
Morocco	1	0	0	1	0	3
Moldova	12	4	4	4	17	14
Mongolia	1	1	0	0	6	1
Montenegro	3	1	1	1	4	3
Netherlands	1	0	0	1	0	3
New Zealand	1	0	0	1	1	3
Nigeria	1	0	0	1	1	5
Northern Ireland	3	0	1	2	1	5
North Macedonia	5	2	2	1	7	3
Norway	5	0	1	4	3	9
Paraguay	1	0	0	1	0	1
Poland	5	1	0	4	4	13
Portugal	2	1	0	1	2	2
Qatar	1	1	0	0	2	1
Romania	9	1	3	5	7	21
Russia	3	1	1	1	3	4
Saint Kitts and Nevis	1	1	0	0	3	0
Saudi Arabia	1	1	0	0	2	0
Scotland	6	2	1	3	6	7
Serbia	2	0	0	2	1	4
Slovakia	2	1	0	1	3	3
Slovenia	4	1	1	2	4	5
South Africa	1	1	0	0	4	1
South Korea	1	0	1	0	2	2
Spain	10	1	0	9	5	29
Sweden	2	1	0	1	2	1
Switzerland	4	0	1	3	1	7
Thailand	1	1	0	0	8	0
Tunisia	2	1	1	0	3	1
Turkey	8	1	1	6	9	22
Ukraine	13	0	5	8	7	19
United Arab Emirates	1	0	0	1	0	1
Uruguay	1	1	0	0	2	0
Uzbekistan	2	1	1	0	3	2
Wales	5	3	1	1	9	3
74 National Teams	313	100	67	146	380	436

== Honours ==
=== Friendly ===
- Trans-Caucasian Championship
  - Champions (3): 1928, 1934, 1935
- Malta International Football Tournament
  - Champions (1): 1998

== See also ==
- Football in Georgia
- List of Georgia international footballers
- Georgian Footballer of the Year
- Georgia national football team results (1990–2019)
- Georgia national football team results (2020–present)
- List of Georgian national football team captains
- Georgia national under-21 football team
- Georgia national under-19 football team
- Georgia national under-17 football team
- Georgia national futsal team
- Georgia national beach soccer team
