= John Clogston =

John S. Clogston (January 18, 1954 – February 2, 1995) was an American journalist and academic with a speciality in the area of news media images of people with disabilities. He made a significant contribution to mass communication research through his development of five media models, which can be used in content analyses of news coverage of people with disabilities and disability issues. He was the author of Disability Coverage in 16 Newspapers published by the Advocado Press in 1990. He had been a wheelchair user since a car accident in 1985.

== Education and professional background ==
Clogston was a native of Wareham, Massachusetts and was a founding member and eventually chair of the Media and Disability Interest Group of the Association for Education in Journalism and Mass Communication (AEJMC). The Media and Disability Interest Group gives out an award in his honor to the Top Student Paper at each year's annual convention.

He was assistant professor of journalism at Northern Illinois University in DeKalb at the time of his death, where he taught courses in news reporting, broadcast news, and electronic news gathering and editing.

Clogston received a Ph.D. from Michigan State University in 1991, a master's degree from The Ohio State University, and a bachelor's degree from St. Lawrence University. His Ph.D. dissertation explored reporters' attitudes toward people with disabilities, as well as news coverage of people with disabilities.

He had a professional background in radio news, having worked as a news director or reporter at stations in New York, Ohio, Connecticut, and Missouri. He also taught communications courses as an adjunct instructor at St. Lawrence University, Northwest Missouri State University, and Michigan State University.

He died in Waterman, Illinois, at age 41.

== Articles and Papers by John Clogston ==
- "Satisfaction with Assistive Technology and Media Use by Deaf Residents of Northern Illinois." (1994). Paper presented to the Association of Education in Journalism and Mass Communication. Atlanta, GA.
- "Disability coverage in American newspapers," (1993). The Disabled, the Media and the Information Age. Jack Nelson (Ed.). Greenwood Press.
- "Changes in coverage patterns of disability issues in three major American newspapers, 1976-1991." (1993). Paper presented to the Association of Education in Journalism and Mass Communication. Kansas City, Mo.
- "Media use by deaf residents in northern Illinois." (1993). Paper presented to the Society for Disability Studies annual meeting. Seattle, Wash.
- "Coverage of persons with disabilities in prestige and high circulation dailies." (1992). Paper presented to the Association for Education in Journalism and Mass Communication. Montreal, Canada.
- "Fifty years of disability coverage in the New York Times." (1992). Paper presented to the Association for Education in Journalism and Mass Communication. Montreal, Que.
- "Journalists' attitudes toward persons with disabilities: A survey of reporters at prestige and high circulation dailies." (1992) Paper presented to the Association of Education in Journalism and Mass Communication. Atlanta, Georgia.
- Reporters' attitudes toward and newspaper coverage of persons with disabilities. (1991). Unpublished doctoral dissertation at Michigan State University.
- Disability Coverage in 16 Newspapers. (1990). Louisville: Advocado Press.
- "Perceptions of Disability in the New York Times." (1990). Paper presented to the Society for Disability Studies annual meeting. Washington, D.C.
- "A theoretical framework for studying media portrayal of persons with disabilities." (1989). Paper presented at the Annual Meeting of the Association for the Education in Journalism and Mass Communication. Minneapolis, Minn. (Second place winner, Moeller Student Paper competition).
- "Teaching beginning broadcast journalism students about coverage of disability." (1989, Oct. 1). Prepared remarks.
- "Influences of candidate party and incumbency on news coverage of 1984 elections in Michigan dailies." (1988) (with F. Fico and G. Pizante). Journalism Quarterly, Vol. 65, No. 3.
- "Influences on story writing and candidate knowledge of Michigan reporters covering the 1984 elections." (1986). (with F. Fico and G. Pizante). Paper presented at the Annual Meeting of the Association for the Education in Journalism and Mass Communication.
