= Anna Margaret Ross Alexander =

American philanthropist (1913–1995)

- Born: Anna Margaret Ross; 17 November 1913; Lafayette, Indiana, US
- Died: 16 February 1995; Indianapolis, Indiana, US
- Known for: philanthropy

Anna Margaret Ross Alexander (1913–1995) was a philanthropist, who organized the first mental health fund drive in Marion County, Indiana. She was elected to the Indianapolis Board of School Commissioners in 1966 during the desegregation and integration period. Under her administration as president in 1970, Indianapolis developed their desegregation plan. She was honored as Woman of the Year in 1970 by Theta Sigma Phi for her service in implementing integration and for being the only woman to have served on the board. She also served on the Tax Review Board and Historic Landmarks Foundation. She had a lifelong commitment to education and has had numerous awards named in her honor.

== Biography ==
Anna Margaret Ross was born on November 17, 1913, in Lafayette, Indiana, to Linn Carnahan Ross and Gladys Gould Ross. She attended Jefferson High School in Lafayette before earning her Bachelor of Science at Purdue University in 1935. That same year on 14 August 1935, she married John Arthur Alexander. The two met at Purdue and her husband became an attorney with Krieg, DeVault, Alexander, and Capehart in Indianapolis. The couple made their home in Indianapolis and had two sons.

Alexander organized the first mental health fund drive in Marion County, Indiana and spent six years on the Marion County Mental Health Board. She was concerned about reading levels and became involved in the school system, joining the Parent Teacher's Associations of PS #80 and Broad Ripple High School. She was elected to the Indianapolis Board of School Commissioners in 1966 and served until 1970. Her final year, she was president. This was the period when Indianapolis's public schools were desegregated, the teaching staff was integrated, and public busing began. Multiple lawsuits were filed and the school commissioners implemented the federal desegregation programs. The final plan which was adopted, involved phasing out the two mostly black high schools and redirecting the elementary graduates to other high schools. Crispus Attucks High School would close after 3 years and Shortridge High School would be turned into a Community College. Alexander confirmed that the plan, while addressing the lawsuit mandate, had been developed independently from the federal recommendations by the board over several months with consultations from citizens and the schools. Also during Alexander's tenure, hot lunches were implemented in all elementary schools in the school district and instructional TV was begun. She was honored at a banquet attended by the governor as the Theta Sigma Phi Woman of the Year in 1970 for her service as the only woman on the Indianapolis School Board.

Alexander served on the Marion County Tax Review Board for three years in the early 1970s and served for nineteen years on the state's Historic Landmarks Foundation. Other organizations that Alexander was involved with included The Children's Museum of Indianapolis, Indiana Landmarks, Indiana State Symphony Society, Indianapolis Museum of Art, Mother's March of Dimes for Polio, and St. Paul's Episcopal Church. Alexander also was a long-term volunteer and donor at the Mary Rigg Neighborhood Center, which gives out annual honors to volunteers, "Help & Hope Hero Awards", named in her honor.

Alexander died 16 February 1995. Purdue's baseball facility was named in honor of Alexander and her husband when the new stadium was dedicated in 2013. Hillsdale College has an endowed chair in History and Political Science in her name.
