= Herbert McWilliams =

South African sailor

Personal information
- Nationality: South African
- Born: 11 June 1907; Port Elizabeth, South Africa
- Died: 11 February 1995 (aged 87); Port Elizabeth, South Africa

Sport
- Sport: Sailing

Herbert McWilliams (11 June 1907 – 11 February 1995) was a South African sailor. He competed in the Firefly event at the 1948 Summer Olympics.
