= Hamza Boubakeur =

- Born: Aboubakeur ben Hamza ben Kadour; June 15, 1912; Geryville (then French Algeria)
- Died: February 4, 1995 (aged 82); Paris, France
- Other name: Hamza Al-Sid-Boubakeur

Hamza Boubakeur or Hamza Al-Sid-Boubakeur was a French politician and Muslim cleric.

Boubakeur was born on June 15, 1912, in Geryville (then French Algeria) as Aboubakeur ben Hamza ben Kadour. He came from the great Arab Family of the Ouled Sidi Cheikh which fought against the French. He is a descendant of both the fierce warrior Sidi Kaddour Ben Hamza and the great soufi master Sidi Abdelkader Ben Muhammed known as "Sidi Cheikh".

He was appointed (di)rector of the Great Mosque of Paris by SFIO Prime Minister Guy Mollet in 1957, replacing Si Kaddour Benghabrit, and kept this position until the appointment of Sheikh Abbas Bencheikh el Hocine in 1982. Hamza Boubakeur is the author of a French translation of the Quran. He is also the father of Dalil Boubakeur, since 1992 himself rector of the Great Mosque of Paris.

Hamza Boubakeur was elected as MP of Department of Oasis in the first legislature of the French Fifth Republic from 1958 to 1962 and President of the General Council of this French Algerian Department.

Boubakeur died on February 4, 1995 in Paris. After his death, he was buried in the mausoleum of Sidi Ben Eddine.
