= Muriel Guggolz =

American fencer

Personal information
- Born: February 28, 1904 New York, New York, United States
- Died: February 9, 1995 (aged 90) Pottstown, Pennsylvania, United States

Sport
- Sport: Fencing

Muriel Guggolz (February 28, 1904 – February 9, 1995) was an American fencer. She competed in the women's individual foil event at the 1932 Summer Olympics.
