= Sailing at the 1948 Summer Olympics – Firefly =

Sailing at the Olympics

Firefly at the Games of the XIV Olympiad
- Gold medalist
- Venue: Torbay
- Dates: 3–12 August
- Competitors: 21 from 21 nations
- Teams: 21

Medalists
| 1st place, gold medalist(s) | | Paul Elvstrøm | Denmark |
| 2nd place, silver medalist(s) | | Ralph Evans | United States |
| 3rd place, bronze medalist(s) | | Koos de Jong | Netherlands |

The Firefly was a sailing event on the Sailing at the 1948 Summer Olympics program in Torbay. Seven races were scheduled. 21 sailors, on 21 boats, from 21 nations competed.

== Results ==
| Rank | Helmsman (Country) | Sailnumber | Race I | | Race II | | Race III | | Race IV | | Race V | | Race VI | | Race VII | | Total Points | Total -1 |
| Rank | Helmsman (Country) | Sailnumber | Rank | Points | Rank | Points | Rank | Points | Rank | Points | Rank | Points | Rank | Points | Rank | Points | Total Points | Total -1 |
|---|---|---|---|---|---|---|---|---|---|---|---|---|---|---|---|---|---|---|
| 1st place, gold medalist(s) | Paul Elvstrøm (DEN) | 486 | ~~DNF~~ | ~~0~~ | 6 | 645 | 3 | 946 | 11 | 382 | 5 | 724 | 1 | 1423 | 1 | 1423 | 5543 | 5543 |
| 2nd place, silver medalist(s) | Ralph Evans (USA) | 501 | 2 | 1122 | 3 | 946 | ~~13~~ | ~~309~~ | 9 | 469 | 1 | 1423 | 5 | 724 | 5 | 724 | 5717 | 5408 |
| 3rd place, bronze medalist(s) | Koos de Jong (NED) | 498 | 6 | 645 | 5 | 724 | ~~17~~ | ~~193~~ | 4 | 821 | 3 | 946 | 3 | 946 | 2 | 1122 | 5397 | 5204 |
| 4 | Rickard Sarby (SWE) | 495 | 8 | 520 | 1 | 1423 | 7 | 578 | 1 | 1423 | ~~DSQ~~ | ~~0~~ | 11 | 382 | 14 | 277 | 4603 | 4603 |
| 5 | Paul McLaughlin (CAN) | 483 | 5 | 724 | 9 | 469 | 8 | 520 | 2 | 1122 | 2 | 1122 | ~~DSQ~~ | ~~0~~ | 7 | 578 | 4535 | 4535 |
| 6 | Felix Sienra Castellanos (URU) | 502 | ~~13~~ | ~~309~~ | 2 | 1122 | 5 | 724 | 8 | 520 | 10 | 423 | 9 | 469 | 4 | 821 | 4388 | 4079 |
| 7 | Jean-Jacques Herbulot (FRA) | 491 | 1 | 1423 | 7 | 578 | 11 | 382 | ~~DSQ~~ | ~~0~~ | 12 | 344 | 2 | 1122 | 16 | 219 | 4068 | 4068 |
| 8 | Pierre Van Der Haeghen (BEL) | 485 | 3 | 946 | 14 | 277 | ~~15~~ | ~~247~~ | 5 | 724 | 6 | 645 | 4 | 821 | 15 | 247 | 3907 | 3660 |
| 9 | Arthur McDonald (GBR) | 503 | 10 | 423 | 4 | 821 | 18 | 168 | 3 | 946 | 7 | 578 | 8 | 520 | ~~DNF~~ | ~~0~~ | 3456 | 3456 |
| 10 | Alfons Oswald (SUI) | 494 | 14 | 277 | 17 | 193 | 1 | 1423 | 17 | 193 | ~~18~~ | ~~168~~ | 13 | 309 | 8 | 520 | 3083 | 2915 |
| 11 | Wolfgang Richter (BRA) | 498 | 7 | 578 | ~~DNF~~ | ~~0~~ | 6 | 645 | 19 | 144 | 4 | 821 | 15 | 247 | 9 | 469 | 2904 | 2904 |
| 12 | Morits Skaugen (NOR) | 492 | ~~19~~ | ~~144~~ | 13 | 309 | 9 | 469 | 13 | 309 | 14 | 277 | 7 | 578 | 3 | 946 | 3032 | 2888 |
| 13 | João Tito (POR) | 500 | ~~15~~ | ~~247~~ | 10 | 423 | 10 | 423 | 7 | 578 | 8 | 520 | 14 | 277 | 11 | 382 | 2850 | 2603 |
| 14 | Livio Spanghero (ITA) | 497 | ~~17~~ | ~~193~~ | 15 | 247 | 4 | 821 | 10 | 423 | 11 | 382 | 17 | 193 | 12 | 344 | 2603 | 2410 |
| 15 | Erik Palmgren (FIN) | 481 | 11 | 382 | ~~DNF~~ | ~~0~~ | 2 | 1122 | DNF | 0 | 15 | 247 | 6 | 645 | DNF | 0 | 2396 | 2396 |
| 16 | Jimmy Mooney (IRL) | 493 | 4 | 821 | 8 | 520 | 14 | 277 | 15 | 247 | 13 | 309 | 18 | 168 | ~~DNF~~ | ~~0~~ | 2342 | 2342 |
| 17 | Jorge Brauer (ARG) | 496 | 16 | 219 | ~~DNF~~ | ~~0~~ | 12 | 344 | 6 | 645 | DNF | 0 | 10 | 423 | 6 | 645 | 2276 | 2276 |
| 18 | Robert French (AUS) | 490 | 18 | 168 | 11 | 382 | ~~19~~ | ~~144~~ | 16 | 219 | 9 | 469 | 12 | 344 | 10 | 423 | 2149 | 2005 |
| 19 | Juan Manuel Alonso-Allende (ESP) | 484 | 9 | 469 | 12 | 344 | 16 | 219 | 12 | 344 | 19 | 144 | ~~DNF~~ | ~~0~~ | 13 | 309 | 1829 | 1829 |
| 20 | Herbert McWilliams (RSA) | 487 | 12 | 344 | 16 | 219 | ~~DNF~~ | ^{0} | 14 | 277 | 16 | 219 | 16 | 219 | DNF | 0 | 1278 | 1278 |
| 21 | Harald von Musil (AUT) | 499 | 20 | 122 | ~~DNF~~ | ~~0~~ | DNF | 0 | 18 | 168 | 17 | 193 | 19 | 144 | DNF | 0 | 627 | 627 |

DNF = Did Not Finish, DNS= Did Not Start, DSQ = Disqualified
= Male, = Female

=== Daily standings ===
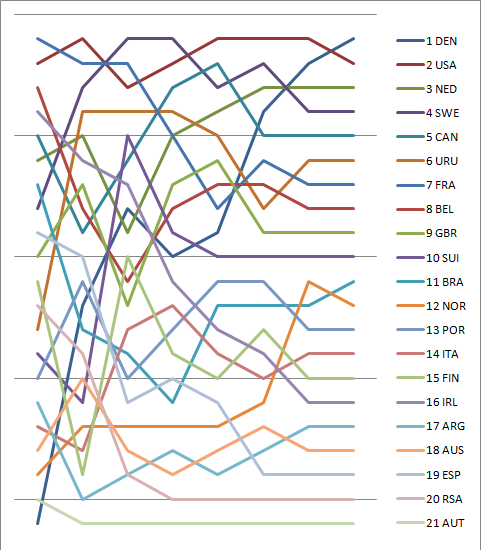
Graph showing the daily standings in the Firefly during the 1948 Summer Olympics

== Courses at Torbay ==
A total of three race area's was positioned by the Royal Navy in Torbay. Each of the classes was using the same kind of course and the same scoring system.
