= Giga Norakidze =

Personal information
- Full name: Anatoli Levanis dze Norakidze
- Date of birth: 30 March 1930
- Place of birth: Ochamchire, Georgian SSR, Soviet Union
- Date of death: 27 February 1995 (aged 64)
- Place of death: Tbilisi, Georgia
- Position: Forward

Youth career
- CYSS Ochamchire

Senior career*
Years	Team	Apps	(Gls)
1948–1949	Dinamo Ochamchire		
1950	Dinamo Sokhumi		
1951	Spartaki Tbilisi	25	(8)
1952–1953	TO Tbilisi		(6)
1953	Spartaki Tbilisi	12	(2)
1954	TO Tbilisi		
1955–1957	SKVO Tbilisi		
1958	Dinamo Tbilisi	5	(0)
1958–1959	SKVO Tbilisi		

Managerial career
- 1961: Gantiadi Tskhakaia
- 1966–1968: Torpedo Kutaisi
- 1969: Meshakhte Tkibuli
- 1969–1970: Dila Gori
- 1971–1972: Mertskhali Ozurgeti
- 1973–1977: Torpedo Kutaisi
- 1977–1978: Dinamo Sokhumi
- 1979: Torpedo Kutaisi
- 1981–1982: Lokomotiv Samtredia
- 1983: Torpedo Kutaisi
- 1983–1984: Lokomotiv Samtredia
- 1987–1989: Dinamo Sokhumi
- 1990–1991: Tskhumi Sokhumi
- 1991–1992: Georgia
- 1992–1993: Torpedo Kutaisi
- 1994: Anci Tbilisi
- * Club domestic league appearances and goals

Anatoli Levanis dze Norakidze (Georgian: ანატოლი ლევანის ძე ნორაკიძე; Russian: Норакидзе Анатолий Леванович; 30 March 1930 – 27 February 1995), known as Giga Norakidze, was a Georgian footballer and manager.

== Playing career ==
Born in Ochamchire, Norakidze played youth football for CYSS Ochamchire, before beginning his senior career at Dinamo Ochamchire in 1948. In 1950, Norakidze signed for Dinamo Sokhumi, moving to Spartaki Tbilisi the following year, scoring eight goals in 25 appearances in the Soviet Top League. In 1952, Norakidze moved to TO Tbilisi, scoring six times across two seasons, before rejoining Spartaki Tbilisi in 1953. Norakidze re-signed for TO Tbilisi in 1954. In 1955, Norakidze signed for SKVO Tbilisi. In 1958, Norakidze moved back up to the Soviet Top League, signing for Dinamo Tbilisi, making five appearances in the competition. Norakidze ended his playing career at Tbilisi.

== Managerial career ==
Following his playing career, Norakidze moved into management, managing Gantiadi Tskhakaia for a season in 1961. From 1966 to 1968, Norakidze was manager of Torpedo Kutaisi. In 1969, Norakidze had a short stint as manager of Meshakhte Tkibuli, before moving to Dila Gori the same year. In 1972, Norakidze was appointed manager of Mertskhali Ozurgeti. Norakidze returned to Torpedo Kutaisi for a four-year spell from 1973 to 1977. After departing Torpedo Kutaisi, Norakidze was appointed manager of former club Dinamo Sokhumi. In 1979, Norakidze returned to Torpedo Kutaisi for a third spell. In 1981, Lokomotiv Samtredia appointed Norakidze as manager. In 1983, Norakidze joined Torpedo Kutaisi for a fourth time as manager, departing later that year to rejoin Lokomotiv Samtredia. In 1987, Dinamo Sokhumi re-appointed Norakidze as manager. In 1990, following the withdrawal of Georgian clubs from the Soviet league system, Norakidze was appointed manager of Tskhumi Sokhumi, guiding the club to seventh place in the inaugural Umaglesi Liga season.

In 1991, Norakidze was appointed manager of the Georgia national team. On 2 July 1991, the country achieved its first international victory, beating Moldova 4–2 away in Chișinău. Norakidze presided over the Georgian national team for three more games, winning once and losing twice.

Following his spell managing the national team, Norakidze returned to club management, managing Torpedo Kutaisi and Anci Tbilisi before his death in 1995.
