= Leon Leonard =

American politician

Member of the New Jersey General Assembly from the Atlantic district
- In office 1941–1948

Personal details
- Born: March 11, 1909 Philadelphia, Pennsylvania
- Died: February 1, 1995 (aged 85)
- Party: Republican

Leon Leonard (March 11, 1909 – February 1, 1995) was an American politician who served in the New Jersey General Assembly from the Atlantic district from 1941 to 1948. He served as Speaker of the New Jersey General Assembly in 1947.
