= Joe Foden =

Australian rules footballer

Personal information
- Full name: Joseph Arthur Foden
- Born: 10 March 1918; St Kilda, Victoria
- Died: 16 February 1995 (aged 76)
- Height: 177 cm (5 ft 10 in)
- Weight: 81 kg (179 lb)

Playing career^{1}
Years	Club	Games (Goals)
1942	North Melbourne	3 (0)
- ^{1} Playing statistics correct to the end of 1942.

Joseph Arthur Foden (10 March 1918 – 16 February 1995) was an Australian rules footballer who played with North Melbourne in the Victorian Football League (VFL).

Foden served in the Australian Army during World War II.
