= Soheib Bencheikh =

French politician

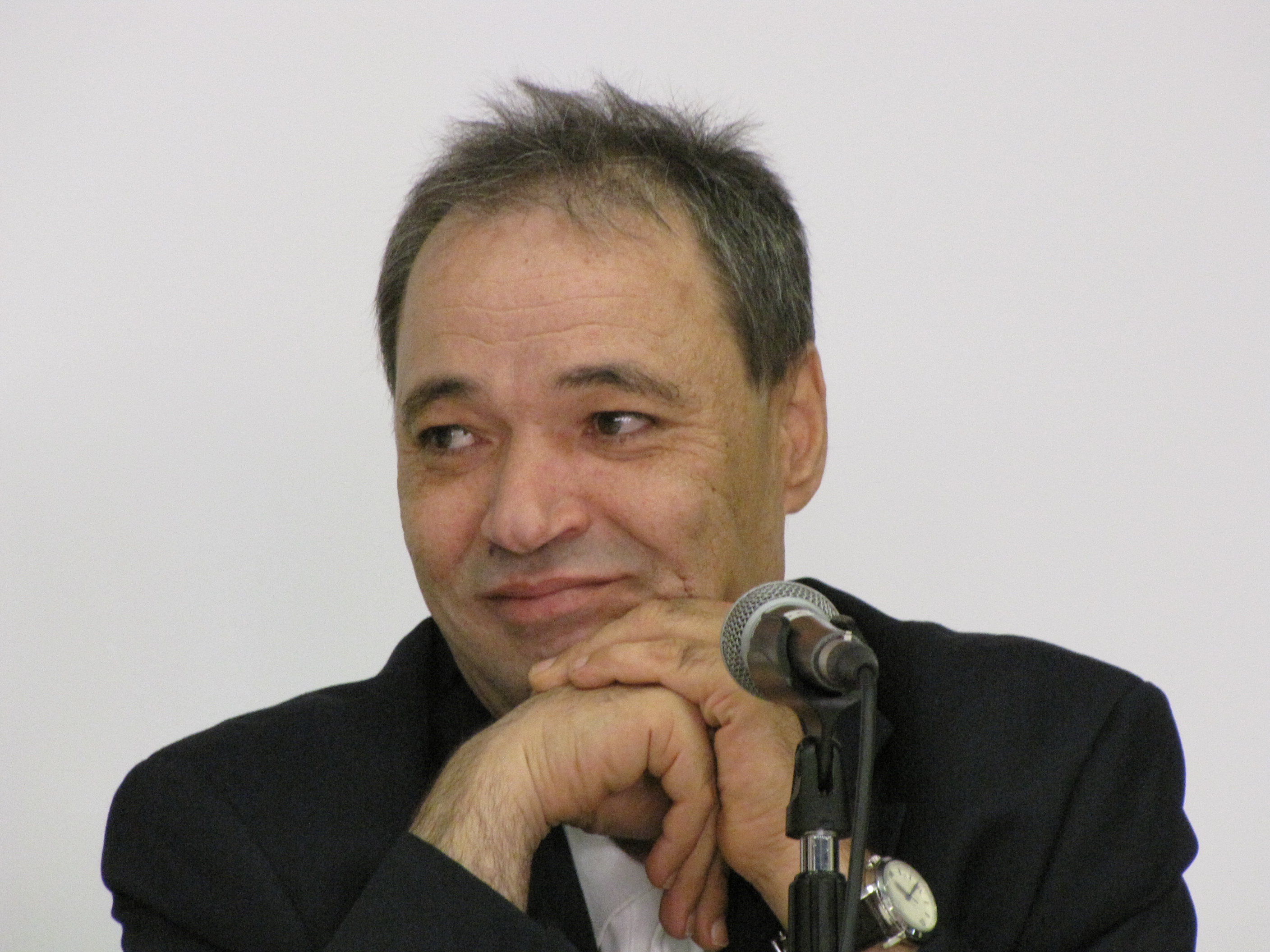
Soheib Bencheikh in 2011

Soheib Bencheikh (Arabic: صهيب بن الشيخ; born 20 December 1961, Jeddah, Saudi Arabia) is an Islamic religious leader and author and would-be French politician.

Bencheikh graduated in Islamic theology at Al-Azhar University, Cairo, Egypt, and at the Free University of Brussels, Belgium. He holds a doctorate in Religious Sciences from the École pratique des hautes études (EPHE), Paris, France. He was nominated as Grand Mufti of Marseille, France, in 1995 by the Great Mosque of Paris. He is a member of the Conseil français du culte musulman (Council of French Muslims) since its creation in 2003.

Bencheikh is an anti-fundamentalist religious leader and an assertive supporter of an Islam eager and capable to adapt itself to the modern world. He also is acknowledged as a reformer Muslim theologian committed to interreligious dialogue. He has written two books Les Grandes Religions and Marianne et le Prophète: L'Islam dans la France laïque, his famous book on the position and opportunities for Muslims in secular democracy.

Among other "modernist" points of view, he stated that education is the best protection of women's honor and well-being (and not the headscarf, which he says is not mandatory).

Bencheikh attempted to run for president in the 2007 French presidential election but failed to get the 500 endorsements needed in order to become an official candidate. He created the movement “Elan Républicain” specifically for this purpose.

== See also ==
- Islamic Modernism
