= Georgia national football team results (1990–2019) =

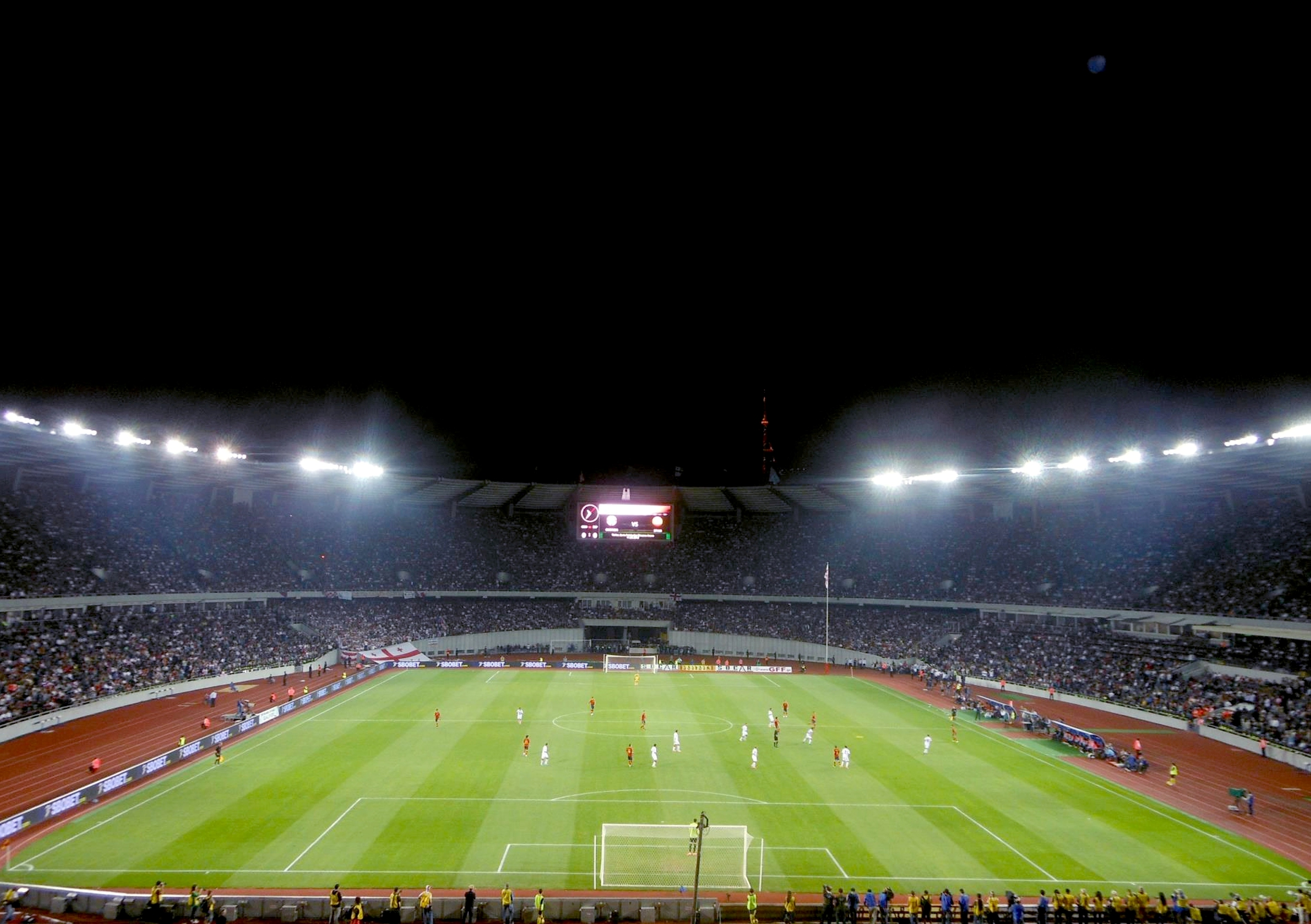
The Boris Paichadze Dinamo Arena in Tbilisi, the current home stadium of the Georgia national football team.

The Georgia national football team represents Georgia in association football and is controlled by the Georgian Football Federation (GFF), the governing body of the sport there. It competes as a member of the Union of European Football Associations (UEFA), which encompasses the countries of Europe. Organised football has been played in the country since the 20th century. Georgia joined UEFA and the International Federation of Association Football (FIFA) in 1992; the country played two friendlies before joining. In 1990-91, due to succession from the Football Federation of the Soviet Union, football in Georgia was under sanctions from the Soviet federation and international ban. In its inspiration to independence from the Russian dominance, Georgia became the first Soviet republic which football parted with the Soviet football.

Georgia's first match—a 2–2 draw against Lithuania—took place on 27 May 1990 and was their only match as the Georgian Soviet Socialist Republic. Their first victory came in their next match, 4–2 against Moldova. They entered their first major international competition in 1994: the qualifying rounds for 1996 UEFA European Football Championship. The team won their first competitive match on 10 February 1994 when they defeated Malta 1–0 in the 1994 Rothmans International Tournament. Georgia made its first appearance in the qualifying rounds of the FIFA World Cup during the 1998 edition, but the country has yet to reach the finals of the World Cup.

The team's largest victory came on 12 October 2023 when they defeated Thailand by eight goals to nil in a friendly. Their worst loss is a 6–1 against Denmark in 2005. Georgia have also been defeated by five goals to nil against Romania in 1996. Levan Kobiashvili holds the appearance record for Georgia, having been capped 100 times during an international career that lasted 15 years. The goalscoring record is held by Shota Arveladze, who scored 26 times in 61 matches. As of April 2023, Georgia are ranked 77th in the FIFA World Rankings. Its highest ever ranking of 42nd was achieved in September 1998.

== International matches ==
Key to background colours
– indicates Georgia won the match
– indicates Georgia's opposition won the match
– indicates the match ended in a draw

=== 1990 ===
| 27 May Friendly | Georgian SSR | 2–2 | Lithuania | Tbilisi, Georgian SSR |
| | Guruli 62'; Kacharava 81' | Report | Narbekovas 12'; Baltušnikas 66' | Stadium: Dinamo Stadium; Attendance: 55,000; Referee: Velodi Miminoshvili (Soviet Union) |

=== 1991 ===
| 2 July Friendly | Moldova | 2–4 | Georgia | Chișinău, Moldavian SSR |
| | Spiridon 27'; Harea 50' | Report | Ketsbaia 5'; Daraselia 13'; Jishkariani 79'; Kavelashvili 88' | Stadium: Stadionul Republican; Attendance: 7,000; Referee: Alexandr Gorin (Soviet Union) |

=== 1992 ===
| 2 September Friendly | Lithuania | 1–0 | Georgia | Kaunas, Lithuania |
| | Mika 90' | Report | | Stadium: Darius and Girėnas Stadium; Attendance: 2,000; Referee: Vitālijs Liholajs (Latvia) |

| 17 September Friendly | Georgia | 6–3 | Azerbaijan | Gurjaani, Georgia |
| | Kizilashvili 20', 48'; Daraselia 52'; S. Arveladze 69'; Gogichaishvili 71' (pen.); Jishkariani 79' (pen.) | Report | Suleymanov 42', 85' (pen.); Rzayev 77' | Stadium: David Kipiani Stadium; Attendance: 3,000; Referee: Guram Sepiashvili (Georgia) |

| 22 December Friendly | Cyprus | 1–0 | Georgia | Limassol, Cyprus |
| | Ioannou 43' | Report | | Stadium: Tsirio Stadium; Attendance: 2,500; Referee: A. Onisiphorou (Cyprus) |

=== 1993 ===
| 25 May Friendly | Azerbaijan | 1–0 | Georgia | Ganja, Azerbaijan |
| | Lobzhanidze 35' (o.g.) | Report | | Stadium: Ganja City Stadium; Attendance: 9,500; Referee: Rustam Ragimov (Azerbaijan) |

=== 1994 ===
| 8 February Rothmans International Tournament | Georgia | 0–1 | Slovenia | Attard, Malta |
| | | Report | Gliha 80' | Stadium: Ta' Qali National Stadium; Attendance: 1,000; Referee: Lawrence Sammut (Malta) |

| 10 February Rothmans International Tournament | Malta | 0–1 | Georgia | Attard, Malta |
| | | Report | Ketsbaia 16' (pen.) | Stadium: Ta' Qali National Stadium; Attendance: 650; Referee: Darko Jamšek (Slovenia) |

| 12 February Rothmans International Tournament | Georgia | 2–0 | Tunisia | Attard, Malta |
| | Kavelashvili 48'; Kudinov 61' | Report | | Stadium: Ta' Qali National Stadium; Attendance: 5,000; Referee: Charles Agius (Malta) |

| 23 February Friendly | Israel | 2–0 | Georgia | Ashdod, Israel |
| | Ohana 28', 77' | Report | | Stadium: Yud-Alef Stadium; Attendance: 1,500; Referee: Haim Lipkovich (Israel) |

| 11 June Friendly | Nigeria | 5–1 | Georgia | Ibadan, Nigeria |
| | Yekini 11', 43'; Siasia 58', 60'; Adepoju 65' | Report | R. Arveladze 12' | Stadium: Liberty Stadium; Attendance: 9,000; Referee: Olufunmi Olaniyan (Nigeria) |

| 26 June Friendly | Latvia | 1–3 | Georgia | Riga, Latvia |
| | Astafjevs 60' | Report | Janashia 13'; Kacharava 74'; Jamarauli 76' | Stadium: ASK Stadion; Attendance: 1,000; Referee: Algirdas Dubinskas (Lithuania) |

| 19 July Friendly | Georgia | 1–1 | Malta | Tbilisi, Georgia |
| | S. Arveladze 37' (pen.) | Report | Spiteri 33' | Stadium: Boris Paichadze National Stadium; Attendance: 35,200; Referee: Urs Meier (Switzerland) |

| 7 September UEFA Euro 1996 qualifying | Georgia | 0–1 | Moldova | Tbilisi, Georgia |
| | | Report | Oprea 40' | Stadium: Boris Paichadze National Stadium; Attendance: 40,000; Referee: Ahmet Çakar (Turkey) |

| 12 October UEFA Euro 1996 qualifying | Bulgaria | 2–0 | Georgia | Sofia, Bulgaria |
| | Kostadinov 58', 63' | Report | | Stadium: Vasil Levski National Stadium; Attendance: 45,000; Referee: Ladislav Gadoši (Slovakia) |

| 16 November UEFA Euro 1996 qualifying | Georgia | 5–0 | Wales | Tbilisi, Georgia |
| | Ketsbaia 31', 49'; Kinkladze 41'; Gogrichiani 59'; S. Arveladze 67' | Report | | Stadium: Boris Paichadze National Stadium; Attendance: 45,000; Referee: Alain Sars (France) |

| 14 December UEFA Euro 1996 qualifying | Albania | 0–1 | Georgia | Tirana, Albania |
| | | Report | S. Arveladze 19' | Stadium: Qemal Stafa Stadium; Attendance: 15,000; Referee: László Molnár (Hungary) |

=== 1995 ===
| 29 March UEFA Euro 1996 qualifying | Georgia | 0–2 | Germany | Tbilisi, Georgia |
| | | Report | Klinsmann 24', 45' | Stadium: Boris Paichadze National Stadium; Attendance: 75,000; Referee: Martin Bodenham (England) |

| 26 April UEFA Euro 1996 qualifying | Georgia | 2–0 | Albania | Tbilisi, Georgia |
| | S. Arveladze 2'; Ketsbaia 42' | Report | | Stadium: Boris Paichadze National Stadium; Attendance: 25,000; Referee: Roelof Luinge (Netherlands) |

| 7 June UEFA Euro 1996 qualifying | Wales | 0–1 | Georgia | Cardiff, Wales |
| | | Report | Kinkladze 74' | Stadium: The Arms Park; Attendance: 8,241; Referee: Ilkka Koho (Finland) |

| 6 September UEFA Euro 1996 qualifying | Germany | 4–1 | Georgia | Nuremberg, Germany |
| | Möller 39'; Ziege 57'; Kirsten 62'; Babbel 72' | Report | Ketsbaia 28' | Stadium: Frankenstadion; Attendance: 40,750; Referee: Jim McCluskey (Scotland) |

| 11 October UEFA Euro 1996 qualifying | Georgia | 2–1 | Bulgaria | Tbilisi, Georgia |
| | S. Arveladze 1'; Kinkladze 47' (pen.) | Report | Stoichkov 87' | Stadium: Boris Paichadze National Stadium; Attendance: 45,000; Referee: Urs Meier (Switzerland) |

| 15 November UEFA Euro 1996 qualifying | Moldova | 3–2 | Georgia | Chișinău, Moldova |
| | Testimiţanu 5' (pen.); Miterev 17', 68' | Report | Janashia 66'; Culibaba 77' (o.g.) | Stadium: Stadionul Republican; Attendance: 6,000; Referee: Mario van der Ende (Netherlands) |

=== 1996 ===
| 27 March Friendly | Cyprus | 0–2 | Georgia | Limassol, Cyprus |
| | | Report | Ketsbaia 53'; Jamarauli 65' | Stadium: Tsirio Stadium; Attendance: 2,000; Referee: Andreas Georgiou (Cyprus) |

| 24 April Friendly | Romania | 5–0 | Georgia | Bucharest, Romania |
| | Moldovan 26', 29', 36'; Lăcătuș 50'; Gâlcă 87' | Report | | Stadium: Stadionul Steaua; Attendance: 10,000; Referee: Athanasios Zahariadis (Greece) |

| 8 May Friendly | Greece | 2–1 | Georgia | Ioannina, Greece |
| | Nikolaidis 58', 87' | Report | Gogrichiani 15' | Stadium: Zosimades Stadium; Attendance: 14,000; Referee: Luan Zulfo (Albania) |

| 1 September Friendly | Norway | 1–0 | Georgia | Oslo, Norway |
| | Solbakken 87' (pen.) | Report | | Stadium: Ullevaal Stadion; Attendance: 8,910; Referee: Knud Stadsgaard (Denmark) |

| 9 October 1998 FIFA World Cup qualification | Italy | 1–0 | Georgia | Perugia, Italy |
| | Ravanelli 43' | Report | | Stadium: Stadio Renato Curi; Attendance: 14,012; Referee: Eric Blareau (Belgium) |

| 9 November 1998 FIFA World Cup qualification | Georgia | 0–2 | England | Tbilisi, Georgia |
| | | Report | Sheringham 15'; Ferdinand 37' | Stadium: Boris Paichadze National Stadium; Attendance: 48,000; Referee: Jorge Coroado (Portugal) |

| 5 December Friendly | Lebanon | 4–2 | Georgia | Beirut, Lebanon |
| | Ghazarian 70'; Hijazi 73'; Taha 78'; Hamade 90' | Report | Iashvili 58'; Kiknadze 67' | Stadium: Beirut Municipal Stadium; Attendance: 3,000; Referee: Taleb Ramadan (Lebanon) |

| 8 December Friendly | Lebanon | 3–2 | Georgia | Beirut, Lebanon |
| | Ayoub 15' (pen.); Taha 23'; Ghazarian 27' | Report | Gakhokidze 13'; Tskitishvili 24' | Stadium: Beirut Municipal Stadium; Attendance: 8,000; Referee: Ahmad Nabil Ayad (Lebanon) |

=== 1997 ===
| 30 March Friendly | Georgia | 7–0 | Armenia | Tbilisi, Georgia |
| | S. Arveladze 12', 57', 67'; Kinkladze 45' (pen.); A. Arveladze 58', 60'; Kavelashvili 81' | Report | | Stadium: Boris Paichadze National Stadium; Attendance: 10,000; Referee: Valentin Ivanov (Russia) |

| 30 April 1998 FIFA World Cup qualification | England | 2–0 | Georgia | London, England |
| | Sheringham 42'; Shearer 90+1' | Report | | Stadium: Wembley Stadium; Attendance: 71,208; Referee: Rémi Harrel (France) |

| 7 June 1998 FIFA World Cup qualification | Georgia | 2–0 | Moldova | Batumi, Georgia |
| | S. Arveladze 27'; Kinkladze 51' | Report | | Stadium: Central Stadium; Attendance: 12,000; Referee: Charles Agius (Malta) |

| 14 June 1998 FIFA World Cup qualification | Poland | 4–1 | Georgia | Katowice, Poland |
| | Ledwoń 32'; Trzeciak 34'; Bukalski 74' (pen.); K. Nowak 90' | Report | S. Arveladze 24' | Stadium: Stadion GKS Katowice; Attendance: 2,000; Referee: Günter Benkö (Austria) |

| 10 September 1998 FIFA World Cup qualification | Georgia | 0–0 | Italy | Tbilisi, Georgia |
| | | Report | | Stadium: Boris Paichadze National Stadium; Attendance: 55,000; Referee: Rune Pedersen (Norway) |

| 24 September 1998 FIFA World Cup qualification | Moldova | 0–1 | Georgia | Chișinău, Moldova |
| | | Report | Ketsbaia 10' | Stadium: Stadionul Republican; Attendance: 5,500; Referee: Dani Koren (Israel) |

| 11 October 1998 FIFA World Cup qualification | Georgia | 3–0 | Poland | Tbilisi, Georgia |
| | A. Arveladze 55'; Tskhadadze 68'; Ketsbaia 74' | Report | | Stadium: Boris Paichadze National Stadium; Attendance: 22,000; Referee: Ľuboš Micheľ (Slovakia) |

=== 1998 ===
| 6 February Rothmans International Tournament | Georgia | 2–1 | Latvia | Attard, Malta |
| | Jamarauli 50', 71' | Report | Bleidelis 86' (pen.) | Stadium: Ta' Qali National Stadium; Attendance: 3,000; Referee: Alfred Micaleff (Malta) |

| 8 February Rothmans International Tournament | Albania | 0–3 | Georgia | Attard, Malta |
| | | Report | Ketsbaia 19'; Kavelashvili 29'; Iashvili 71' | Stadium: Ta' Qali National Stadium; Attendance: 750; Referee: Charles Agius (Malta) |

| 10 February Rothmans International Tournament | Malta | 1–3 | Georgia | Attard, Malta |
| | Magri Overend 56' (pen.) | Report | Kavelashvili 13', 75'; Jamarauli 71' | Stadium: Ta' Qali National Stadium; Attendance: 2,500; Referee: Bujar Pregia (Albania) |

| 2 May Friendly | Tunisia | 1–1 | Georgia | Sousse, Tunisia |
| | Ben Younes 80' | Report | Kinkladze 40' | Stadium: Stade Olympique de Sousse; Attendance: 20,000; Referee: Kamel Berber (Algeria) |

| 30 May Friendly | Georgia | 1–1 | Russia | Tbilisi, Georgia |
| | Janashia 19' | Report | Simutenkov 11' | Stadium: Boris Paichadze National Stadium; Attendance: 75,000; Referee: Tahir Süleymanov (Azerbaijan) |

| 12 August Friendly | Azerbaijan | 1–0 | Georgia | Ganja, Azerbaijan |
| | Ağayev 49' | Report | | Stadium: Ganja City Stadium; Attendance: 5,000; Referee: Asim Xudiyev (Azerbaijan) |

| 19 August Friendly | Ukraine | 4–0 | Georgia | Kyiv, Ukraine |
| | Rebrov 1', 42'; Skachenko 57'; Kovalyov 75' | Report | | Stadium: Olimpiyskiy National Sports Complex; Attendance: 13,500; Referee: Romāns Lajuks (Latvia) |

| 5 September UEFA Euro 2000 qualifying | Georgia | 1–0 | Albania | Tbilisi, Georgia |
| | A. Arveladze 65' | Report | | Stadium: Boris Paichadze National Stadium; Attendance: 35,000; Referee: Claude Détruche (Switzerland) |

| 10 October UEFA Euro 2000 qualifying | Latvia | 1–0 | Georgia | Riga, Latvia |
| | Štolcers 2' | Report | | Stadium: Daugava Stadium; Attendance: 1,900; Referee: Constantin Zotta (Romania) |

| 14 October UEFA Euro 2000 qualifying | Greece | 3–0 | Georgia | Marousi, Greece |
| | Machlas 12'; Liberopoulos 15'; Ouzounidis 36' | Report | | Stadium: Olympic Stadium; Attendance: 12,681; Referee: Atanas Uzunov (Bulgaria) |

| 18 November Friendly | Georgia | 3–1 | Estonia | Tbilisi, Georgia |
| | Ashvetia 65', 85'; Janashia 72' | | Arbeiter 90' | Stadium: Boris Paichadze National Stadium; Attendance: 28,000; Referee: Merab Malaghuradze (Georgia) |

=== 1999 ===
| 20 March Friendly | Georgia | 0–1 | Ukraine | Tbilisi, Georgia |
| | | Report | Konovalov 78' | Stadium: Boris Paichadze National Stadium; Attendance: 27,500; Referee: Slavik Kazaryan (Armenia) |

| 27 March UEFA Euro 2000 qualifying | Georgia | 1–1 | Slovenia | Tbilisi, Georgia |
| | Dzhanashia 42' | Report | Knavs 52' | Stadium: Boris Paichadze National Stadium; Attendance: 20,000; Referee: Alain Hamer (Luxembourg) |

| 28 April UEFA Euro 2000 qualifying | Georgia | 1–4 | Norway | Tbilisi, Georgia |
| | Dzhanashia 57' | Report | Iversen 16'; Flo 25', 35'; Solskjær 37' | Stadium: Boris Paichadze National Stadium; Attendance: 20,000; Referee: Sándor Puhl (Hungary) |

| 30 May UEFA Euro 2000 qualifying | Norway | 1–0 | Georgia | Oslo, Norway |
| | Iversen 4' | Report | | Stadium: Ullevaal Stadion; Attendance: 18,236; Referee: Luc Huyghe (Belgium) |

| 5 June UEFA Euro 2000 qualifying | Georgia | 1–2 | Greece | Tbilisi, Georgia |
| | Ketsbaia 55' | Report | Mavrogenidis 85'; Machlas 89' | Stadium: Boris Paichadze National Stadium; Attendance: 7,400; Referee: William Young (Scotland) |

| 4 September UEFA Euro 2000 qualifying | Slovenia | 2–1 | Georgia | Ljubljana, Slovenia |
| | Ačimovič 48'; Zahovič 80' | Report | S. Arveladze 55' | Stadium: Bežigrad Stadium; Attendance: 7,000; Referee: Jan Wegereef (Netherlands) |

| 8 September UEFA Euro 2000 qualifying | Georgia | 2–2 | Latvia | Tbilisi, Georgia |
| | S. Arveladze 30'; Kavelashvili 52' | Report | Bleidelis 62'; Stepanovs 90' | Stadium: Boris Paichadze National Stadium; Attendance: 12,000; Referee: Miroslav Radoman (Yugoslavia) |

| 9 October UEFA Euro 2000 qualifying | Albania | 2–1 | Georgia | Tirana, Albania |
| | Rraklli 30'; Kola 36' | Report | S. Arveladze 52' | Stadium: Qemal Stafa Stadium; Attendance: 3,000; Referee: Alfred Micallef (Malta) |

=== 2000 ===
| 2 February Cyprus International Tournament | Georgia | 2–0 | Slovakia | Larnaca, Cyprus |
| | Ketsbaia 83'; Kavelashvili 86' | Report | | Stadium: Antonis Papadopoulos Stadium; Attendance: 400; Referee: Kostas Theodotou (Cyprus) |

| 4 February Cyprus International Tournament | Georgia | 1–1 (a.e.t.) (2–4 p) | Romania | Larnaca, Cyprus |
| | Ketsbaia 41' | Report | Hîldan 81' | Stadium: Antonis Papadopoulos Stadium; Attendance: 200; Referee: Kostas Kapitanis (Cyprus) |
| | Penalties |
| | Nemsadze (penalty missed); Ketsbaia (penalty scored); Janashia (penalty missed); Silagadze (penalty scored) | | (penalty scored) Bătrânu; (penalty scored) Dumitru; (penalty scored) Petre; (penalty missed) Niculescu; (penalty scored) Mara |

| 6 February Cyprus International Tournament | Armenia | 1–2 | Georgia | Limassol, Cyprus |
| | Khachatryan 44' | Report | Janashia 7'; Menteshashvili 55' | Stadium: Tsirio Stadium; Attendance: 6,000; Referee: Kostas Konstantinou (Cyprus) |

| 29 March Friendly | Israel | 1–1 | Georgia | Ashkelon, Israel |
| | Berkovic 83' | Report | Kinkladze 27' | Stadium: Municipal Stadium; Attendance: 8,000; Referee: Metin Tokat (Turkey) |

| 26 April Friendly | Armenia | 0–0 | Georgia | Yerevan, Armenia |
| | | Report | | Stadium: Hrazdan Stadium; Attendance: 22,000; Referee: Genadz Yakubovskiy (Belarus) |

| 4 June Friendly | Azerbaijan | 0–0 | Georgia | Baku, Azerbaijan |
| | | Report | | Stadium: Tofiq Bahramov Republican Stadium; Attendance: 7,000; Referee: Xaqani Məmmədov (Azerbaijan) |

| 11 June Friendly | Estonia | 1–0 | Georgia | Tallinn, Estonia |
| | Piiroja 17' | Report | | Stadium: Kadriorg Stadium; Attendance: 450; Referee: Sten Kaldma (Estonia) |

| 16 August Friendly | Iran | 2–1 | Georgia | Tehran, Iran |
| | Jamshidi 3'; Majidi 26' | Report | Kavelashvili 70' | Stadium: Azadi Stadium; Attendance: 20,000; Referee: Davoud Abharan (Iran) |

| 7 October 2002 FIFA World Cup qualification | Lithuania | 0–4 | Georgia | Kaunas, Lithuania |
| | | Report | Ketsbaia 18', 33'; Kinkladze 46'; A. Arveladze 84' | Stadium: Steponas Darius ir Stasys Girėnas Stadionas; Attendance: 2,317; Referee: Ryszard Wójcik (Poland) |

| 11 October 2002 FIFA World Cup qualification | Italy | 2–0 | Georgia | Ancona, Italy |
| | Del Piero 47' (pen.), 88' (pen.) | Report | | Stadium: Stadio del Conero; Attendance: 18,593; Referee: Karl-Erik Nilsson (Sweden) |

=== 2001 ===
| 14 February Friendly | Georgia | 0–0 | Ukraine | Tbilisi, Georgia |
| | | Report | | Stadium: Boris Paichadze National Stadium; Attendance: 30,000; Referee: Xaqani Məmmədov (Azerbaijan) |

| 28 March 2002 FIFA World Cup qualification | Georgia | 0–2 | Romania | Tbilisi, Georgia |
| | | Report | Munteanu 68'; Contra 79' | Stadium: Boris Paichadze National Stadium; Attendance: 27,000; Referee: Rune Pedersen (Norway) |

| 24 April Friendly | Georgia | 3–2 | Israel | Tbilisi, Georgia |
| | Ketsbaia 9', 36'; A. Arveladze 88' | Report | Mizrahi 16', 72' | Stadium: Boris Paichadze National Stadium; Attendance: 8,000; Referee: Sergo Kvaratskhelia (Georgia) |

| 9 May Friendly | Georgia | 1–0 | Azerbaijan | Kutaisi, Georgia |
| | Ionanidze 62' | Report | | Stadium: Givi Kiladze Stadium; Attendance: 2,000; Referee: Merab Malaghuradze (Georgia) |

| 2 June 2002 FIFA World Cup qualification | Georgia | 1–2 | Italy | Tbilisi, Georgia |
| | Gakhokidze 80' | Report | Totti 67'; Delvecchio 45' | Stadium: Boris Paichadze National Stadium; Attendance: 30,000; Referee: Eduardo Iturralde González (Spain) |

| 6 June 2002 FIFA World Cup qualification | Hungary | 4–1 | Georgia | Budapest, Hungary |
| | Mátyus 40'; Sebők 46' (pen.); Korsós 55', 61' | Report | Kobiashvili 77' | Stadium: Népstadion; Attendance: 7,325; Referee: Hartmut Strampe (Germany) |

| 15 August Friendly | Luxembourg | 0–3 | Georgia | Mondercange, Luxembourg |
| | | Report | Demetradze 19', 50'; Aleksidze 69' | Stadium: Stade Nouveau; Attendance: 1,700; Referee: Terje Hauge (Norway) |

| 1 September 2002 FIFA World Cup qualification | Georgia | 3–1 | Hungary | Tbilisi, Georgia |
| | S. Arveladze 32'; Jamarauli 53'; Iashvili 64' | Report | Mátyus 43' | Stadium: Lokomotiv Stadium; Attendance: 6,000; Referee: Drago Kos (Slovenia) |

| 5 September 2002 FIFA World Cup qualification | Georgia | 2–0 | Lithuania | Tbilisi, Georgia |
| | Iashvili 81', 83' | Report | | Stadium: Lokomotiv Stadium; Attendance: 18,000; Referee: Haim Yaacov (Israel) |

| 6 October 2002 FIFA World Cup qualification | Romania | 1–1 | Georgia | Bucharest, Romania |
| | Popescu 88' | Report | Iashvili 54' | Stadium: Stadionul Steaua; Attendance: 20,000; Referee: Ľuboš Micheľ (Slovakia) |

=== 2002 ===
| 27 March Friendly | Georgia | 4–1 | South Africa | Tbilisi, Georgia |
| | Kobiashvili 15' (pen.); Demetradze 32', 86'; Aleksidze 84' | Report | Buckley 67' | Stadium: Lokomotiv Stadium; Attendance: 15,000; Referee: Andriy Shandor (Ukraine) |

| 17 April Friendly | Ukraine | 2–1 | Georgia | Kyiv, Ukraine |
| | Rebrov 17'; Tymoshchuk 90+2' | Report | Burduli 72' | Stadium: Dynamo Stadium; Attendance: 17,000; Referee: Ľuboš Micheľ (Slovakia) |

| 21 August Friendly | Turkey | 3–0 | Georgia | Trabzon, Turkey |
| | Erdem 8'; Haspolatlı 51'; Kahveci 71' | Report | | Stadium: Hüseyin Avni Aker Stadium; Attendance: 30,000; Referee: Nikos Agelakis (Greece) |

| 8 September UEFA Euro 2004 qualifying | Switzerland | 4–1 | Georgia | Basel, Switzerland |
| | Frei 37'; H. Yakin 62'; Müller 74'; Chapuisat 81' | Report | S. Arveladze 62' | Stadium: St. Jakob-Park; Attendance: 20,500; Referee: Vladimir Krisnak (Slovakia) |

=== 2003 ===
| 12 February Friendly | Georgia | 2–2 | Moldova | Tbilisi, Georgia |
| | Chaladze 61'; Ashvetia 83' | Report | Golban 76'; Dadu 84' (pen.) | Stadium: Lokomotiv Stadium; Attendance: 7,000; Referee: Gevorg Hovhannisyan (Armenia) |

| 29 March UEFA Euro 2004 qualifying | Georgia | 1–2 | Republic of Ireland | Tbilisi, Georgia |
| | Kobiashvili 62' | Report | Duff 18'; Doherty 85' | Stadium: Lokomotiv Stadium; Attendance: 15,000; Referee: Kyros Vassaras (Greece) |

| 2 April UEFA Euro 2004 qualifying | Georgia | 0–0 | Switzerland | Tbilisi, Georgia |
| | | Report | | Stadium: Lokomotiv Stadium; Attendance: 10,000; Referee: Edo Trivković (Croatia) |

| 30 April UEFA Euro 2004 qualifying | Georgia | 1–0 | Russia | Tbilisi, Georgia |
| | Asatiani 11' | Report | | Stadium: Lokomotiv Stadium; Attendance: 11,000; Referee: Franz-Xaver Wack (Germany) |

| 11 June UEFA Euro 2004 qualifying | Republic of Ireland | 2–0 | Georgia | Dublin, Ireland |
| | Doherty 43'; Keane 58' | Report | | Stadium: Lansdowne Road; Attendance: 34,000; Referee: Eduardo Iturralde González (Spain) |

| 6 September UEFA Euro 2004 qualifying | Georgia | 3–0 | Albania | Tbilisi, Georgia |
| | S. Arveladze 8', 43'; Ashvetia 17' | Report | | Stadium: Boris Paichadze National Stadium; Attendance: 18,000; Referee: Nicolai Vollquartz (Denmark) |

| 10 September UEFA Euro 2004 qualifying | Albania | 3–1 | Georgia | Tirana, Albania |
| | Hasi 51'; Tare 53'; Bushi 80' | Report | S. Arveladze 63' | Stadium: Qemal Stafa Stadium; Attendance: 10,500; Referee: Salomir Mircea (Romania) |

| 11 October UEFA Euro 2004 qualifying | Russia | 3–1 | Georgia | Moscow, Russia |
| | Bulykin 29'; Titov 45'; Sychev 73' | Report | Iashvili 3' | Stadium: Lokomotiv Central Stadium; Attendance: 30,000; Referee: Konrad Plautz (Austria) |

=== 2004 ===
| 18 February Cyprus International Tournament | Georgia | 0–3 | Romania | Larnaca, Cyprus |
| | | Report | Mutu 30', 69'; Cernat 87' | Stadium: Neo GSZ Stadium; Attendance: 300; Referee: Romāns Lajuks (Latvia) |

| 19 February Cyprus International Tournament | Cyprus | 3–1 | Georgia | Nicosia, Cyprus |
| | Charalambidis 45', 55'; Elia 73' | Report | Gabidauri 56' | Stadium: Makario Stadium; Attendance: 1,500; Referee: Sergey Kapanin (Kazakhstan) |

| 21 February Cyprus International Tournament | Armenia | 2–0 | Georgia | Nicosia, Cyprus |
| | Arman Karamyan 42'; Artavazd Karamyan 52' | Report | | Stadium: Makario Stadium; Attendance: 200; Referee: Romāns Lajuks (Latvia) |

| 27 May Friendly | Georgia | 0–1 | Israel | Tbilisi, Georgia |
| | | Report | Badir 33' | Stadium: Lokomotiv Stadium; Attendance: 23,000; Referee: Oleh Oriekhov (Ukraine) |

| 18 August Friendly | Moldova | 1–0 | Georgia | Tiraspol, Moldova |
| | Miterev 67' | Report | | Stadium: Sheriff Stadium; Attendance: 6,500; Referee: Vitaliy Godulyan (Ukraine) |

| 4 September 2006 FIFA World Cup qualification | Turkey | 1–1 | Georgia | Trabzon, Turkey |
| | Tekke 48' | Report | Asatiani 83' | Stadium: Hüseyin Avni Aker Stadium; Attendance: 10,169; Referee: Luis Medina Cantalejo (Spain) |

| 8 September 2006 FIFA World Cup qualification | Georgia | 2–0 | Albania | Tbilisi, Georgia |
| | Iashvili 15'; Demetradze 90' | Report | | Stadium: Lokomotiv Stadium; Attendance: 20,000; Referee: Mark Courtney (Northern Ireland) |

| 12 October 2006 FIFA World Cup qualification | Ukraine | 2–0 | Georgia | Lviv, Ukraine |
| | Byelik 11'; Shevchenko 79' | Report | | Stadium: Ukraina Stadium; Attendance: 29,000; Referee: Wolfgang Stark (Germany) |

| 17 November 2006 FIFA World Cup qualification | Georgia | 2–2 | Denmark | Tbilisi, Georgia |
| | Demetradze 35'; Asatiani 76' | Report | Tomasson 9', 64' | Stadium: Lokomotiv Stadium; Attendance: 25,000; Referee: Darko Čeferin (Slovenia) |

=== 2005 ===
| 9 February Friendly | Georgia | 1–0 | Lithuania | Tbilisi, Georgia |
| | Ashvetia 57' | Report | | Stadium: Mikheil Meskhi Stadium; Attendance: 2,000; Referee: Zöhrab Gadiyev (Azerbaijan) |

| 26 March 2006 FIFA World Cup qualification | Georgia | 1–3 | Greece | Tbilisi, Georgia |
| | Asatiani 22' | Report | Kapsis 43'; Vryzas 45'; Giannakopoulos 53' | Stadium: Mikheil Meskhi Stadium; Attendance: 25,700; Referee: Roberto Rosetti (Italy) |

| 30 March 2006 FIFA World Cup qualification | Georgia | 2–5 | Turkey | Tbilisi, Georgia |
| | Amisulashvili 13'; Iashvili 40' | Report | Seyhan 10'; Tekke 18', 35'; Avcı 71'; Tuncay 88' | Stadium: Mikheil Meskhi Stadium; Attendance: 10,000; Referee: Terje Hauge (Norway) |

| 4 June 2006 FIFA World Cup qualification | Albania | 3–2 | Georgia | Tirana, Albania |
| | Tare 6', 55'; Skela 33' | Report | Burduli 85'; Kobiashvili 90' | Stadium: Qemal Stafa Stadium; Attendance: 0 Referee: Alexandru Tudor (Romania) |
Note: Game was played "behind closed doors"

| 17 August 2006 FIFA World Cup qualification | Kazakhstan | 1–2 | Georgia | Almaty, Kazakhstan |
| | Kenzhekhanov 23' | Report | Demetradze 51', 84' | Stadium: Almaty Central Stadium; Attendance: 9,000; Referee: Richard Havrilla (Slovakia) |

| 3 September 2006 FIFA World Cup qualification | Georgia | 1–1 | Ukraine | Tbilisi, Georgia |
| | Gakhokidze 89' | Report | Rotan 43' | Stadium: Mikheil Meskhi Stadium; Attendance: 0 Referee: Tom Henning Øvrebø (Norway) |
Note: Game was played "behind closed doors"

| 7 September 2006 FIFA World Cup qualification | Denmark | 6–1 | Georgia | Copenhagen, Denmark |
| | Jensen 9'; Poulsen 30'; Agger 42'; Tomasson 54'; Larsen 79', 84' | Report | Demetradze 36' (pen.) | Stadium: Parken Stadium; Attendance: 27,177; Referee: Emil Božinovski (Macedonia) |

| 8 October 2006 FIFA World Cup qualification | Georgia | 0–0 | Kazakhstan | Tbilisi, Georgia |
| | | Report | | Stadium: Mikheil Meskhi Stadium; Attendance: 0 Referee: Jouni Hyytiä (Finland) |
Note: Game was played "behind closed doors"

| 12 October 2006 FIFA World Cup qualification | Greece | 1–0 | Georgia | Piraeus, Greece |
| | Papadopoulos 17' | Report | | Stadium: Karaiskakis Stadium; Attendance: 28,186; Referee: Matteo Trefoloni (Italy) |

| 12 November Friendly | Bulgaria | 6–2 | Georgia | Sofia, Bulgaria |
| | Yankov 2', 28'; Berbatov 35', 47'; Todorov 62', 90' (pen.) | Report | Jakobia 86'; Gogua 90' | Stadium: Vasil Levski National Stadium; Attendance: 1,375; Referee: Milan Karadžić (Serbia and Montenegro) |

| 16 November Friendly | Georgia | 3–2 | Jordan | Tbilisi, Georgia |
| | Demetradze 4', 64'; S. Arveladze 75' | Report | Salim 35'; Saad 59' | Stadium: Mikheil Meskhi Stadium; Attendance: 8,000 |

=== 2006 ===
| 1 March Malta International Tournament | Malta | 0–2 | Georgia | Ta' Qali, Malta |
| | | Report | Martsvaladze 8'; Kankava 18' | Stadium: Ta' Qali National Stadium; Attendance: 2,000; Referee: Viaceslav Banari (Moldova) |

| 22 March Friendly | Albania | 0–0 | Georgia | Tirana, Albania |
| | | Report | | Stadium: Qemal Stafa; Attendance: 7,300; Referee: Paolo Dondarini (Italy) |

| 27 May Friendly | Georgia | 1–3 | New Zealand | Altenkirchen, Germany |
| | S. Arveladze 41' | Report | Coveny 35', 53'; Killen 37' | Stadium: Glocken Spitze Stadium; Attendance: 500; Referee: Wolfgang Stark (Germany) |

| 31 May Friendly | Paraguay | 1–0 | Georgia | Dornbirn, Austria |
| | Valdez 37' | Report | | Stadium: Birkenwiese Dornbirn; Attendance: 6,500; Referee: Thomas Gangle (Austria) |

| 16 August UEFA Euro 2008 qualifying | Faroe Islands | 0–6 | Georgia | Toftir, Faroe Islands |
| | | Report | Mujiri 16'; Iashvili 18'; S. Arveladze 37', 62', 82'; Kobiashvili 51' (pen.) | Stadium: Svangaskarð; Attendance: 2,114; Referee: Michael Thomas Ross (Northern Ireland) |

| 2 September UEFA Euro 2008 qualifying | Georgia | 0–3 | France | Tbilisi, Georgia |
| | | Report | Malouda 7'; Saha 15'; Asatiani 47' (o.g.) | Stadium: Boris Paichadze National Stadium; Attendance: 65,000; Referee: Jan Wegereef (Netherlands) |

| 6 September UEFA Euro 2008 qualifying | Ukraine | 3–2 | Georgia | Kyiv, Ukraine |
| | Shevchenko 31'; Rotan 61'; Rusol 80' | Report | S. Arveladze 38'; Demetradze 60' | Stadium: Olimpiyskiy National Sports Complex; Attendance: 40,000; Referee: Jaroslav Jara (Czech Republic) |

| 7 October Friendly | Germany | 2–0 | Georgia | Rostock, Germany |
| | Schweinsteiger 24'; Ballack 67' | | | Stadium: Ostseestadion; Attendance: 28,000; Referee: Gerald Lehner (Austria) |

| 11 October UEFA Euro 2008 qualifying | Georgia | 1–3 | Italy | Tbilisi, Georgia |
| | Shashiashvili 26' | Report | De Rossi 18'; Camoranesi 63'; Perrotta 71' | Stadium: Boris Paichadze National Stadium; Attendance: 50,000; Referee: Mike Riley (England) |

| 15 November Friendly | Georgia | 2–0 | Uruguay | Tbilisi, Georgia |
| | Kobiashvili 40' (pen.), 61' | Report | | Stadium: Boris Paichadze National Stadium; Attendance: 12,000; Referee: Vitaliy Godulyan (Ukraine) |

=== 2007 ===
| 7 February Friendly | Georgia | 1–0 | Turkey | Tbilisi, Georgia |
| | Siradze 76' | Report | | Stadium: Boris Paichadze National Stadium; Attendance: 53,000; Referee: Romāns Lajuks (Latvia) |

| 24 March UEFA Euro 2008 qualifying | Scotland | 2–1 | Georgia | Glasgow, Scotland |
| | Boyd 11'; Beattie 89' | Report | S. Arveladze 41' | Stadium: Hampden Park; Attendance: 50,850; Referee: Nicolai Vollquartz (Denmark) |

| 28 March UEFA Euro 2008 qualifying | Georgia | 3–1 | Faroe Islands | Tbilisi, Georgia |
| | Siradze 25'; Iashvili 46', 90+5' (pen.) | Report | R. Jacobsen 57' | Stadium: Boris Paichadze National Stadium; Attendance: 15,000; Referee: Pavel Saliy (Kazakhstan) |

| 2 June UEFA Euro 2008 qualifying | Lithuania | 1–0 | Georgia | Kaunas, Lithuania |
| | Mikoliūnas 78' | Report | | Stadium: S.Dariaus ir S.Girėno Stadium; Attendance: 6,000; Referee: Claudio Circhetta (Switzerland) |

| 6 June UEFA Euro 2008 qualifying | France | 1–0 | Georgia | Auxerre, France |
| | Nasri 33' | Report | | Stadium: Stade de l'Abbé Deschamps; Attendance: 21,000; Referee: Lucílio Batista (Portugal) |

| 22 August Friendly | Luxembourg | 0–0 | Georgia | Luxembourg City, Luxembourg |
| | | Report | | Stadium: Stade Josy Barthel; Attendance: 1,123; Referee: Stephen Weatherall (Northern Ireland) |

| 8 September UEFA Euro 2008 qualifying | Georgia | 1–1 | Ukraine | Tbilisi, Georgia |
| | Siradze 87' | Report | Shelayev 7' | Stadium: Boris Paichadze National Stadium; Attendance: 25,000; Referee: Alain Hamer (Luxembourg) |

| 12 September Friendly | Azerbaijan | 1–1 | Georgia | Baku, Azerbaijan |
| | Subasic 44' | Report | Tatanashvili 48' | Stadium: Tofiq Bahramov Stadium; Attendance: 10,000; Referee: Valentin Kovalenko (Uzbekistan) |

| 13 October UEFA Euro 2008 qualifying | Italy | 2–0 | Georgia | Genoa, Italy |
| | Pirlo 44'; Grosso 84' | Report | | Stadium: Stadio Luigi Ferraris; Attendance: 23,057; Referee: Carlos Megía Dávila (Spain) |

| 17 October UEFA Euro 2008 qualifying | Georgia | 2–0 | Scotland | Tbilisi, Georgia |
| | Mchedlidze 16'; Siradze 64' | Report | | Stadium: Boris Paichadze National Stadium; Attendance: 29,377; Referee: Knut Kircher (Germany) |

| 16 November Friendly | Qatar | 1–2 | Georgia | Al Rayyan, Qatar |
| | Koni 56' | Report | Kankava 46'; Salukvadze 64' | Stadium: Thani bin Jassim Stadium; Attendance: 300; Referee: Jafaar Mahdi Al-Khabbaz (Bahrain) |

| 21 November UEFA Euro 2008 qualifying | Georgia | 0–2 | Lithuania | Tbilisi, Georgia |
| | | Report | Kšanavičius 52', 90+6' | Stadium: Boris Paichadze National Stadium; Attendance: 21,300; Referee: Ljubomir Krstevski (Macedonia) |

=== 2008 ===
| 6 February Friendly | Georgia | 1–3 | Latvia | Tbilisi, Georgia |
| | Kaladze 46' | Report | Karlsons 7'; Stepanovs 16'; Astafjevs 34' | Stadium: Boris Paichadze National Stadium; Attendance: 6,000; Referee: Syarhey Shmolik (Belarus) |

| 26 March Friendly | Northern Ireland | 4–1 | Georgia | Belfast, Northern Ireland |
| | Lafferty 25', 36'; Healy 33'; Kobiashvili 87' (o.g.) | Report | Healy 55' (o.g.) | Stadium: Windsor Park; Attendance: 12,333; Referee: Luc Wilmes (Luxembourg) |

| 27 May Friendly | Estonia | 1–1 | Georgia | Tallinn, Estonia |
| | Kink 64' (pen.) | Report | Kenia 83' | Stadium: A. Le Coq Arena; Attendance: 2,500; Referee: Thomas Vejlgaard (Denmark) |

| 31 May Friendly | Portugal | 2–0 | Georgia | Viseu, Portugal |
| | Moutinho 18'; Sabrosa 44' (pen.) | Report | | Stadium: Estádio do Fontelo; Attendance: 8,500; Referee: Meir Levi (Israel) |

| 20 August Friendly | Wales | 1–2 | Georgia | Swansea, Wales |
| | Koumas 16' | Report | Kenia 67'; Gotsiridze 90' | Stadium: Liberty Stadium; Attendance: 6,438; Referee: Matej Jug (Slovenia) |

| 6 September 2010 FIFA World Cup qualification | Georgia | 1–2 | Republic of Ireland | Mainz, Germany (Note: Originally scheduled for Tbilisi, Georgia but moved to neutral venue due to the 2008 South Ossetia war. The original replacement venue was the Wildparkstadion in Karlsruhe, Germany, but the ground became unavailable, so it was moved to the Stadion am Bruchweg in Mainz.) |
| | Kenia 90+2' | Report | Doyle 13'; Whelan 70' | Stadium: Stadion am Bruchweg; Attendance: 4,500; Referee: Zsolt Szabó (Hungary) |

| 10 September 2010 FIFA World Cup qualification | Italy | 2–0 | Georgia | Udine, Italy |
| | De Rossi 16', 89' | Report | | Stadium: Stadio Friuli; Attendance: 27,164; Referee: Thomas Einwaller (Austria) |

| 11 October 2010 FIFA World Cup qualification | Georgia | 1–1 | Cyprus | Tbilisi, Georgia |
| | Kobiashvili 73' | Report | Konstantinou 67' | Stadium: Boris Paichadze National Stadium; Attendance: 42,000; Referee: Radek Matějek (Czech Republic) |

| 15 October 2010 FIFA World Cup qualification | Georgia | 0–0 | Bulgaria | Tbilisi, Georgia |
| | | Report | | Stadium: Boris Paichadze National Stadium; Attendance: 35,250; Referee: Björn Kuipers (Netherlands) |

| 19 November Friendly | Romania | 2–1 | Georgia | Bucharest, Romania |
| | Marica 62'; Goian 70' | Report | Martsvaladze 12' | Stadium: Stadionul Dinamo; Attendance: 3,000; Referee: Kyros Vassaras (Greece) |

=== 2009 ===
| 11 February 2010 FIFA World Cup qualification | Republic of Ireland | 2–1 | Georgia | Dublin, Ireland |
| | Keane 73' (pen.), 78' | Report | Iashvili 1' | Stadium: Croke Park; Attendance: 45,000; Referee: Jouni Hyytiä (Finland) |

| 28 March 2010 FIFA World Cup qualification | Cyprus | 2–1 | Georgia | Larnaca, Cyprus |
| | Konstantinou 33'; Christofi 56' | Report | Kobiashvili 71' (pen.) | Stadium: Antonis Papadopoulos Stadium; Attendance: 1,151; Referee: Fredy Fautrel (France) |

| 1 April 2010 FIFA World Cup qualification | Georgia | 0–0 | Montenegro | Tbilisi, Georgia |
| | | Report | | Stadium: Boris Paichadze National Stadium; Attendance: 16,000; Referee: David Malcolm (Northern Ireland) |

| 6 June Friendly | Georgia | 1–2 | Moldova | Tbilisi, Georgia |
| | Khizanishvili 85' | Report | Sofroni 8'; Golovatenco 57' | Stadium: Mikheil Meskhi Stadium; Attendance: 4,000; Referee: Pavel Saliy (Kazakhstan) |

| 10 June Friendly | Albania | 1–1 | Georgia | Tirana, Albania |
| | Agolli 58' | Report | Dvalishvili 2' | Stadium: Qemal Stafa Stadium; Attendance: 2,000; Referee: Aleksandar Stavrev (Macedonia) |

| 12 August Friendly | Malta | 2–0 | Georgia | Attard, Malta |
| | Mifsud 64', 73' | Report | | Stadium: Ta' Qali National Stadium; Attendance: 15,000; Referee: Panikos Kailis (Cyprus) |

| 5 September 2010 FIFA World Cup qualification | Georgia | 0–2 | Italy | Tbilisi, Georgia |
| | Kaladze 56', 66' (o.g.) | Report | | Stadium: Boris Paichadze National Stadium; Attendance: 32,000; Referee: Marcin Borski (Poland) |

| 9 September Friendly | Iceland | 3–1 | Georgia | Reykjavík, Iceland |
| | Garðar Jóhannsson 14'; Ólafur Ingi Skúlason 18'; Veigar Páll Gunnarsson 55' | Report | Dvalishvili 33' | Stadium: Laugardalsvöllur; Attendance: 4,726; Referee: Matteo Trefoloni (Italy) |

| 10 October 2010 FIFA World Cup qualification | Montenegro | 2–1 | Georgia | Podgorica, Montenegro |
| | Batak 13'; Delibašić 78' | Report | Dvalishvili 45' | Stadium: Podgorica City Stadium; Attendance: 5,420; Referee: Selçuk Dereli (Turkey) |

| 14 October 2010 FIFA World Cup qualification | Bulgaria | 6–2 | Georgia | Sofia, Bulgaria |
| | Berbatov 6', 23', 36'; Petrov 14', 44'; Angelov 31' | Report | Kobiashvili 34' (pen.); Dvalishvili 51' | Stadium: Vasil Levski National Stadium; Attendance: 390; Referee: Kristinn Jakobsson (Iceland) |

=== 2010 ===
| 3 March Friendly | Georgia | 2–1 | Estonia | Tbilisi, Georgia |
| | Kobiashvili 45+4' (pen.); Siradze 90+4' | Report | Purje 83' | Stadium: Boris Paichadze National Stadium; Attendance: 35,000; Referee: Viaceslav Banari (Moldova) |

| 25 May Friendly | Cameroon | 0–0 | Georgia | Linz, Austria |
| | | Report | | Stadium: Stadion auf der Gugl; Attendance: 3,500; Referee: Bernhard Brugger (Austria) |

| 11 August Friendly | Moldova | 0–0 | Georgia | Chișinău, Moldova |
| | | Report | | Stadium: Zimbru Stadium; Attendance: 5,000; Referee: Viktor Shvetsov (Ukraine) |

| 2 September UEFA Euro 2012 qualifying | Greece | 1–1 | Georgia | Piraeus, Greece |
| | Spyropoulos 72' | Report | Iashvili 3' | Stadium: Karaiskakis Stadium; Attendance: 14,794; Referee: Carlos Clos Gómez (Spain) |

| 7 September UEFA Euro 2012 qualifying | Georgia | 0–0 | Israel | Tbilisi, Georgia |
| | | Report | | Stadium: Boris Paichadze National Stadium; Attendance: 52,000; Referee: Sascha Kever (Switzerland) |

| 8 October UEFA Euro 2012 qualifying | Georgia | 1–0 | Malta | Tbilisi, Georgia |
| | Siradze 90+1' | Report | | Stadium: Boris Paichadze National Stadium; Attendance: 38,000; Referee: Alan Black (Northern Ireland) |

| 12 October UEFA Euro 2012 qualifying | Latvia | 1–1 | Georgia | Riga, Latvia |
| | Cauņa 90+1' | Report | Siradze 74' | Stadium: Skonto Stadium; Attendance: 4,330; Referee: Bruno Paixão (Portugal) |

| 17 November Friendly | Slovenia | 1–2 | Georgia | Koper, Slovenia |
| | Cesar 53' | Report | Guruli 67'; Ananidze 68' | Stadium: Bonifika Stadium; Attendance: 4,000; Referee: Mark Whitby (Wales) |

=== 2011 ===
| 9 February Friendly | Armenia | 1–2 | Georgia | Limassol, Cyprus |
| | Manucharyan 63' (pen.) | Report | Iashvili 22'; Siradze 34' | Stadium: Tsirion Stadium; Attendance: 300; Referee: Giannis Anastasiou (Cyprus) |

| 26 March UEFA Euro 2012 qualifying | Georgia | 1–0 | Croatia | Tbilisi, Georgia |
| | Kobiashvili 90' | Report | | Stadium: Boris Paichadze National Stadium; Attendance: 54,500; Referee: Paolo Tagliavento (Italy) |

| 29 March UEFA Euro 2012 qualifying | Israel | 1–0 | Georgia | Tel Aviv, Israel |
| | Ben Haim 59' | Report | | Stadium: Bloomfield Stadium; Attendance: 13,716; Referee: Fredy Fautrel (France) |

| 3 June UEFA Euro 2012 qualifying | Croatia | 2–1 | Georgia | Split, Croatia |
| | Mandžukić 76'; Kalinić 78' | Report | Kankava 17' | Stadium: Stadion Poljud; Attendance: 28,000; Referee: Stefan Johannesson (Sweden) |

| 10 August Friendly | Poland | 1–0 | Georgia | Lubin, Poland |
| | Błaszczykowski 36' | Report | | Stadium: Dialog Arena; Attendance: 12,310; Referee: Andriy Shandor (Ukraine) |

| 2 September UEFA Euro 2012 qualifying | Georgia | 0–1 | Latvia | Tbilisi, Georgia |
| | | Report | Cauņa 64' | Stadium: Mikheil Meskhi Stadium; Attendance: 15,422; Referee: Leontios Trattou (Cyprus) |

| 6 September UEFA Euro 2012 qualifying | Malta | 1–1 | Georgia | Attard, Malta |
| | Mifsud 25' | Report | Kankava 15' | Stadium: Ta' Qali National Stadium; Attendance: 5,000; Referee: Pol van Boekel (Netherlands) |

| 11 October UEFA Euro 2012 qualifying | Georgia | 1–2 | Greece | Tbilisi, Georgia |
| | Davit Targamadze 19' | Report | Fotakis 79'; Charisteas 85' | Stadium: Mikheil Meskhi Stadium; Attendance: 7,824; Referee: Daniele Orsato (Italy) |

| 11 November Friendly | Georgia | 2–0 | Moldova | Tbilisi, Georgia |
| | Kobakhidze 36'; Ananidze 39' (pen.) | Report | | Stadium: Mikheil Meskhi Stadium; Attendance: 4,000; Referee: Vusal Aliyev (Azerbaijan) |

=== 2012 ===
| 29 February Friendly | Georgia | 2–1 | Albania | Tbilisi, Georgia |
| | Kobakhidze 47'; Amisulashvili 88' | Report | Çani 3' | Stadium: Mikheil Meskhi Stadium; Attendance: 18,000; Referee: Ghenadie Sidenco (Moldova) |

| 24 May Friendly | Georgia | 1–3 | Turkey | Wals-Siezenheim, Austria |
| | Targamadze 52' | Report | Altıntop 12'; Şahin 40'; İnan 82' (pen.) | Stadium: Red Bull Arena; Attendance: 700; Referee: Markus Hameter (Austria) |

| 15 August Friendly | Luxembourg | 1–2 | Georgia | Differdange, Luxembourg |
| | Joachim 84' (pen.) | Report | Mchedlidze 2'; Amisulashvili 32' | Stadium: Stade Municipal de la Ville de Differdange; Attendance: 1,215; Referee: Clément Turpin (France) |

| 7 September 2014 FIFA World Cup qualification | Georgia | 1–0 | Belarus | Tbilisi, Georgia |
| | Okriashvili 51' | Report | | Stadium: Boris Paichadze Dinamo Arena; Attendance: 20,000; Referee: Stanislav Todorov (Bulgaria) |

| 11 September 2014 FIFA World Cup qualification | Georgia | 0–1 | Spain | Tbilisi, Georgia |
| | | Report | Soldado 86' | Stadium: Boris Paichadze Dinamo Arena; Attendance: 54,598; Referee: Svein Oddvar Moen (Norway) |

| 12 October 2014 FIFA World Cup qualification | Finland | 1–1 | Georgia | Helsinki, Finland |
| | Hämäläinen 62' | Report | Kashia 56' | Stadium: Helsinki Olympic Stadium; Attendance: 12,607; Referee: Yevhen Aranovsky (Ukraine) |

| 16 October 2014 FIFA World Cup qualification | Belarus | 2–0 | Georgia | Minsk, Belarus |
| | Bressan 6'; Drahun 28' | Report | | Stadium: Dinamo Stadium; Attendance: 15,300; Referee: Robert Schörgenhofer (Austria) |

| 14 November Friendly | Georgia | 0–0 | Egypt | Tbilisi, Georgia |
| | | Report | | Stadium: Mikheil Meskhi Stadium; Attendance: 4,000; Referee: Andris Treimanis (Latvia) |

=== 2013 ===
| 6 February Friendly | Albania | 1–2 | Georgia | Tirana, Albania |
| | Bogdani 25' | Report | Vatsadze 41'; Lobjanidze 82' | Stadium: Qemal Stafa Stadium; Attendance: 3,000; Referee: Dimitar Meckarovski (Macedonia) |

| 22 March 2014 FIFA World Cup qualification | France | 3–1 | Georgia | Saint-Denis, France |
| | Giroud 45+1'; Valbuena 47'; Ribéry 61' | Report | Kobakhidze 71' | Stadium: Stade de France; Attendance: 71,147; Referee: Ivan Bebek (Croatia) |

| 2 June Friendly | Republic of Ireland | 4–0 | Georgia | Dublin, Ireland |
| | Keogh 42'; Cox 48'; Keane 77', 87' | Report | | Stadium: Aviva Stadium; Attendance: 20,100; Referee: Sebastian Colțescu (Romania) |

| 5 June Friendly | Denmark | 2–1 | Georgia | Aalborg, Denmark |
| | Pedersen 77'; Eriksen 89' | Report | Dzaria 52' | Stadium: Nordjyske Arena; Attendance: 6,000; Referee: Felix Brych (Germany) |

| 14 August Friendly | Kazakhstan | 1–0 | Georgia | Astana, Kazakhstan |
| | Khizhnichenko 17' | Report | | Stadium: Astana Arena; Attendance: 13,500; Referee: Sergey Tsinkevich (Belarus) |

| 6 September 2014 FIFA World Cup qualification | Georgia | 0–0 | France | Tbilisi, Georgia |
| | | Report | | Stadium: Boris Paichadze Dinamo Arena; Attendance: 26,360; Referee: Fırat Aydınus (Turkey) |

| 10 September 2014 FIFA World Cup qualification | Georgia | 0–1 | Finland | Tbilisi, Georgia |
| | | Report | Eremenko 74' (pen.) | Stadium: Boris Paichadze Dinamo Arena; Attendance: 25,321; Referee: Leontios Trattou (Cyprus) |

| 15 October 2014 FIFA World Cup qualification | Spain | 2–0 | Georgia | Albacete, Spain |
| | Negredo 26'; Mata 61' | Report | | Stadium: Estadio Carlos Belmonte; Attendance: 16,133; Referee: Florian Meyer (Germany) |

=== 2014 ===
| 5 March Friendly | Georgia | 2–0 | Liechtenstein | Tbilisi, Georgia |
| | Chanturia 25'; Ananidze 46' (pen.) | Report | | Stadium: Mikheil Meskhi Stadium; Attendance: 6,000; Referee: Andris Treimanis (Latvia) |

| 29 May Friendly | Saudi Arabia | 0–2 | Georgia | Jerez de la Frontera, Spain |
| | | Report | Okriashvili 45+2'; Dvalishvili 71' | Stadium: Estadio Municipal de Chapín; Referee: Carlos del Cerro Grande (Spain) |

| 3 June Friendly | United Arab Emirates | 1–0 | Georgia | Meyrin, Switzerland |
| | Fardan 74' | Report | | Stadium: Stade des Arberes; Referee: Stephan Studer (Switzerland) |

| 7 September UEFA Euro 2016 qualifying | Georgia | 1–2 | Republic of Ireland | Tbilisi, Georgia |
| | Okriashvili 38' | Report | McGeady 24', 90' | Stadium: Boris Paichadze Dinamo Arena; Attendance: 22,000; Referee: Kevin Blom (Netherlands) |

| 11 October UEFA Euro 2016 qualifying | Scotland | 1–0 | Georgia | Glasgow, Scotland |
| | Khubutia 28' (o.g.) | Report | | Stadium: Ibrox Stadium; Attendance: 34,719; Referee: Miroslav Zelinka (Czech Republic) |

| 14 October UEFA Euro 2016 qualifying | Gibraltar | 0–3 | Georgia | Loulé, Portugal |
| | | Report | Gelashvili 9'; Okriashvili 19'; Kankava 69' | Stadium: Estádio Algarve; Attendance: 281; Referee: Harald Lechner (Austria) |

| 14 November UEFA Euro 2016 qualifying | Georgia | 0–4 | Poland | Tbilisi, Georgia |
| | | Report | Glik 51'; Krychowiak 71'; Mila 73'; Milik 90+2' | Stadium: Boris Paichadze Dinamo Arena; Attendance: 25,635; Referee: Paolo Tagliavento (Italy) |

=== 2015 ===
| 25 March Friendly | Georgia | 2–0 | Malta | Tbilisi, Georgia |
| | Kankava 83'; Qazaishvili 90+1' | Report | | Stadium: Mikheil Meskhi Stadium; Attendance: 16,000; Referee: Aleksandrs Anufrijevs (Latvia) |

| 29 March UEFA Euro 2016 qualifying | Georgia | 0–2 | Germany | Tbilisi, Georgia |
| | | Report | Reus 39'; Müller 44' | Stadium: Boris Paichadze Dinamo Arena; Attendance: 51,000; Referee: Clément Turpin (France) |

| 9 June Friendly | Georgia | 1–2 | Ukraine | Linz, Austria |
| | Vatsadze 81' | Report | Kravets 57'; Konoplyanka 67' | Stadium: Stadion auf der Gugl; Attendance: 700; Referee: Markus Hameter (Austria) |

| 13 June UEFA Euro 2016 qualifying | Poland | 4–0 | Georgia | Warsaw, Poland |
| | Milik 62'; Lewandowski 89', 90+2', 90+3' | Report | | Stadium: Stadion Narodowy; Attendance: 56,512; Referee: Aleksei Kulbakov (Belarus) |

| 4 September UEFA Euro 2016 qualifying | Georgia | 1–0 | Scotland | Tbilisi, Georgia |
| | Kazaishvili 38' | Report | | Stadium: Boris Paichadze Dinamo Arena; Attendance: 23,000; Referee: Ovidiu Haţegan (Romania) |

| 7 September UEFA Euro 2016 qualifying | Republic of Ireland | 1–0 | Georgia | Dublin, Ireland |
| | Walters 69' | Report | | Stadium: Aviva Stadium; Attendance: 27,200; Referee: István Vad (Hungary) |

| 8 October UEFA Euro 2016 qualifying | Georgia | 4–0 | Gibraltar | Tbilisi, Georgia |
| | Vatsadze 30', 45'; Okriashvili 35' (pen.); Kazaishvili 87' | Report | | Stadium: Boris Paichadze Dinamo Arena; Attendance: 11,330; Referee: Serhiy Boyko (Ukraine) |

| 11 October UEFA Euro 2016 qualifying | Germany | 2–1 | Georgia | Leipzig, Germany |
| | Müller 50' (pen.); Kruse 79' | Report | Kankava 53' | Stadium: Red Bull Arena; Attendance: 43,630; Referee: Pavel Královec (Czech Republic) |

| 11 November Friendly | Estonia | 3–0 | Georgia | Tallinn, Estonia |
| | Purje 61'; Pikk 65'; Gussev 88' | Report | | Stadium: A. Le Coq Arena; Attendance: 2,266; Referee: Raymond Crangle (Northern Ireland) |

| 16 November Friendly | Albania | 2–2 | Georgia | Tirana, Albania |
| | Basha 89'; Cikalleshi 90+4' | Report | Amisulashvili 2'; Chanturia 53' | Stadium: Qemal Stafa Stadium; Attendance: 2,000; Referee: Davide Massa (Italy) |

=== 2016 ===
| 29 March Friendly | Georgia | 1–1 | Kazakhstan | Tbilisi, Georgia |
| | Okriashvili 38' | Report | Nurgaliev 35' | Stadium: Boris Paichadze Dinamo Arena; Attendance: 15,000; Referee: Clayton Pisani (Malta) |

| 27 May Friendly | Slovakia | 3–1 | Georgia | Wels, Austria |
| | Nemec 5', 56'; Zreľák 70' | Report | Kenia 71' | Stadium: Renner Arena; Attendance: 782; Referee: Oliver Drachta (Austria) |

| 3 June Friendly | Romania | 5–1 | Georgia | Bucharest, Romania |
| | Popa 2'; Amisulashvili 3' (o.g.); Stanciu 49'; Torje 80'; Keșerü 87' | Report | Moți 68' (o.g.) | Stadium: Arena Națională; Attendance: 27,934; Referee: Artur Ribeiro (Portugal) |

| 7 June Friendly | Spain | 0–1 | Georgia | Getafe, Spain |
| | | Report | Okriashvili 40' | Stadium: Coliseum Alfonso Pérez; Attendance: 14,650; Referee: Vilhjálmur Alvar Þórarinsson (Iceland) |

| 5 September 2018 FIFA World Cup qualification | Georgia | 1–2 | Austria | Tbilisi, Georgia |
| | Ananidze 78' | Report | Hinteregger 16'; Janko 42' | Stadium: Boris Paichadze Dinamo Arena; Attendance: 25,000; Referee: Aleksei Kulbakov (Belarus) |

| 6 October 2018 FIFA World Cup qualification | Republic of Ireland | 1–0 | Georgia | Dublin, Ireland |
| | Coleman 56' | Report | | Stadium: Aviva Stadium; Attendance: 39,793; Referee: Tony Chapron (France) |

| 9 October 2018 FIFA World Cup qualification | Wales | 1–1 | Georgia | Cardiff, Wales |
| | Bale 10' | Report | Okriashvili 57' | Stadium: Cardiff City Stadium; Attendance: 32,652; Referee: Paolo Mazzoleni (Italy) |

| 12 November 2018 FIFA World Cup qualification | Georgia | 1–1 | Moldova | Tbilisi, Georgia |
| | Qazaishvili 16' | Report | Gațcan 78' | Stadium: Boris Paichadze Dinamo Arena; Attendance: 40,642; Referee: Georgi Kabakov (Bulgaria) |

=== 2017 ===
| 23 January Friendly | Uzbekistan | 2–2 | Georgia | Dubai, United Arab Emirates |
| | Shomurodov 45', 78' | Report | Shonia 69'; S. Lobjanidze 77' | Stadium: The Sevens Stadium; Referee: Hamad Ali Yousef Al Ali (United Arab Emirates) |

| 25 January Friendly | Jordan | 1–0 | Georgia | Dubai, United Arab Emirates |
| | Al-Dardour 43' | Report | | Stadium: Theyab Awana Stadium; Referee: Fahad Al-Marri (Qatar) |

| 24 March 2018 FIFA World Cup qualification | Georgia | 1–3 | Serbia | Tbilisi, Georgia |
| | Kacharava 6' | Report | Tadić 45' (pen.); A. Mitrović 64'; Gaćinović 86' | Stadium: Boris Paichadze Dinamo Arena; Attendance: 30,000; Referee: Felix Zwayer (Germany) |

| 28 March Friendly | Georgia | 5–0 | Latvia | Tbilisi, Georgia |
| | Ananidze 18' (pen.), 77'; Kvilitaia 32', 68'; Arabidze 90' | Report | | Stadium: Boris Paichadze Dinamo Arena; Attendance: 14,000; Referee: Suren Baliyan (Armenia) |

| 6 June Friendly | Georgia | 3–0 | Saint Kitts and Nevis | Tbilisi, Georgia |
| | Arabidze 52', 73' (pen.); Dvalishvili 81' | Report | | Stadium: Mikheil Meskhi Stadium; Referee: Zaven Hovhannisyan (Armenia) |

| 11 June 2018 FIFA World Cup qualification | Moldova | 2–2 | Georgia | Chișinău, Moldova |
| | Gînsari 15'; Dedov 36' | Report | Merebashvili 65'; Qazaishvili 70' | Stadium: Zimbru Stadium; Attendance: 4,803; Referee: Andreas Ekberg (Sweden) |

| 2 September 2018 FIFA World Cup qualification | Georgia | 1–1 | Republic of Ireland | Tbilisi, Georgia |
| | Qazaishvili 34' | Report | Duffy 4' | Stadium: Boris Paichadze Dinamo Arena; Attendance: 19,669; Referee: Ivan Kružliak (Slovakia) |

| 5 September 2018 FIFA World Cup qualification | Austria | 1–1 | Georgia | Vienna, Austria |
| | Schaub 43' | Report | Gvilia 8' | Stadium: Ernst-Happel-Stadion; Attendance: 13,400; Referee: Orel Grinfeeld (Israel) |

| 6 October 2018 FIFA World Cup qualification | Georgia | 0–1 | Wales | Tbilisi, Georgia |
| | | Report | Lawrence 49' | Stadium: Boris Paichadze Dinamo Arena; Attendance: 22,290; Referee: Jesús Gil Manzano (Spain) |

| 9 October 2018 FIFA World Cup qualification | Serbia | 1–0 | Georgia | Belgrade, Serbia |
| | Prijović 74' | Report | | Stadium: Rajko Mitić Stadium; Attendance: 55,200; Referee: Paweł Gil (Poland) |

| 10 November Friendly | Georgia | 1–0 | Cyprus | Gori, Georgia |
| | Kvilitaia 24' | Report | | Stadium: Tengiz Burjanadze Stadium; Attendance: 4,100; Referee: Suren Baliyan (Armenia) |

| 13 November Friendly | Georgia | 2–2 | Belarus | Kutaisi, Georgia |
| | Sikharulidze 35'; Dvali 51' | Report | Stasevich 24'; Nyakhaychyk 66' | Stadium: Ramaz Shengelia Stadium; Attendance: 7,500; Referee: Suren Baliyan (Armenia) |

=== 2018 ===
| 24 March Friendly | Georgia | 4–0 | Lithuania | Tbilisi, Georgia |
| | Papunashvili 15'; Kvilitaia 23'; Qazaishvili 31' (pen.); Chakvetadze 40' | Report | | Stadium: Mikheil Meskhi Stadium; Attendance: 18,000; Referee: Alexandru Tean (Moldova) |

| 27 March Friendly | Georgia | 2–0 | Estonia | Tbilisi, Georgia |
| | Tabidze 6'; Qazaishvili 35' | Report | | Stadium: Mikheil Meskhi Stadium; Attendance: 19,000; Referee: Aleksei Kulbakov (Belarus) |

| 1 June Friendly | Georgia | 1–0 | Malta | Schwaz, Austria |
| | Kashia 89' (pen.) | Report | | Stadium: Stadion Schwaz; Attendance: 50; Referee: Manfred Schüttengruber (Austria) |

| 5 June Friendly | Luxembourg | 1–0 | Georgia | Luxembourg City, Luxembourg |
| | Joachim 70' | Report | | Stadium: Stade Josy Barthel; Attendance: 1,786; Referee: Iwan Griffith (Wales) |

| 6 September 2018–19 UEFA Nations League | Kazakhstan | 0–2 | Georgia | Astana, Kazakhstan |
| | | Report | Chakvetadze 69'; Malyi 74' (o.g.) | Stadium: Astana Arena; Attendance: 28,736; Referee: Halil Umut Meler (Turkey) |

| 9 September 2018–19 UEFA Nations League | Georgia | 1–0 | Latvia | Tbilisi, Georgia |
| | Okriashvili 77' (pen.) | Report | | Stadium: Boris Paichadze Dinamo Arena; Attendance: 45,716; Referee: Anastasios Papapetrou (Greece) |

| 13 October 2018–19 UEFA Nations League | Georgia | 3–0 | Andorra | Tbilisi, Georgia |
| | Qazaishvili 33', 84'; Kankava 90+5' | Report | | Stadium: Boris Paichadze Dinamo Arena; Attendance: 32,212; Referee: Leontios Trattou (Cyprus) |

| 16 October 2018–19 UEFA Nations League | Latvia | 0–3 | Georgia | Riga, Latvia |
| | | Report | Kankava 8'; Gvilia 29'; Chakvetadze 61' | Stadium: Daugava Stadium; Attendance: 3,185; Referee: Petr Ardeleánu (Czech Republic) |

| 15 November 2018–19 UEFA Nations League | Andorra | 1–1 | Georgia | Andorra la Vella, Andorra |
| | C. Martínez 63' | Report | Chakvetadze 9' | Stadium: Estadi Nacional; Attendance: 1,311; Referee: Radu Petrescu (Romania) |

| 19 November 2018–19 UEFA Nations League | Georgia | 2–1 | Kazakhstan | Tbilisi, Georgia |
| | Merebashvili 59'; Chakvetadze 84' | Report | Omirtayev 90' | Stadium: Boris Paichadze Dinamo Arena; Attendance: 46,686; Referee: Tiago Martins (Portugal) |

=== 2019 ===
| 23 March UEFA Euro 2020 qualifying | Georgia | 0–2 | Switzerland | Tbilisi, Georgia |
| | | Report | Zuber 57'; Zakaria 80' | Stadium: Boris Paichadze Dinamo Arena; Attendance: 49,207; Referee: Craig Pawson (England) |

| 26 March UEFA Euro 2020 qualifying | Republic of Ireland | 1–0 | Georgia | Dublin, Ireland |
| | Hourihane 36' | Report | | Stadium: Aviva Stadium; Attendance: 40,317; Referee: Serdar Gözübüyük (Netherlands) |

| 7 June UEFA Euro 2020 qualifying | Georgia | 3–0 | Gibraltar | Tbilisi, Georgia |
| | Gvilia 30'; Papunashvili 59'; Arveladze 76' (pen.) | Report | | Stadium: Boris Paichadze Dinamo Arena; Attendance: 17,357; Referee: Antti Munukka (Finland) |

| 10 June UEFA Euro 2020 qualifying | Denmark | 5–1 | Georgia | Copenhagen, Denmark |
| | Dolberg 13', 63'; Eriksen 30' (pen.); Poulsen 73'; Braithwaite 90+3' | Report | Lobzhanidze 25' | Stadium: Parken Stadium; Attendance: 15,387; Referee: Robert Schörgenhofer (Austria) |

| 5 September Friendly | South Korea | 2–2 | Georgia | Istanbul, Turkey |
| | Hwang Ui-jo 48', 85' | Report | Ananidze 40'; Kvilitaia 90' | Stadium: Başakşehir Fatih Terim Stadium; Attendance: 750; Referee: Hüseyin Göçek (Turkey) |

| 8 September UEFA Euro 2020 qualifying | Georgia | 0–0 | Denmark | Tbilisi, Georgia |
| | | Report | | Stadium: Boris Paichadze Dinamo Arena; Attendance: 21,456; Referee: François Letexier (France) |

| 12 October UEFA Euro 2020 qualifying | Georgia | 0–0 | Republic of Ireland | Tbilisi, Georgia |
| | | Report | | Stadium: Boris Paichadze Dinamo Arena; Referee: Marco Guida (Italy) |

| 15 October UEFA Euro 2020 qualifying | Gibraltar | 2–3 | Georgia | Gibraltar |
| | L. Casciaro 66'; R. Chipolina 74' | Report | Kharaishvili 10'; Kankava 21'; Kvilitaia 84' | Stadium: Victoria Stadium; Attendance: 1,455; Referee: Paolo Valeri (Italy) |

| 15 November UEFA Euro 2020 qualifying | Switzerland | 1–0 | Georgia | St. Gallen, Switzerland |
| | Itten 77' | Report | | Stadium: Kybunpark; Attendance: 16,400; Referee: Danny Makkelie (Netherlands) |

| 19 November Friendly | Croatia | 2–1 | Georgia | Pula, Croatia |
| | Kashia 25' (o.g.); Perišić 54' | Report | Papunashvili 19' | Stadium: Stadion Aldo Drosina; Attendance: 5,072; Referee: Alan Mario Sant (Malta) |

== All-time record ==
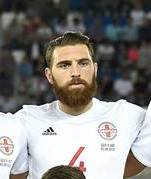
Guram Kashia is Georgia's most capped player with 110 appearances.

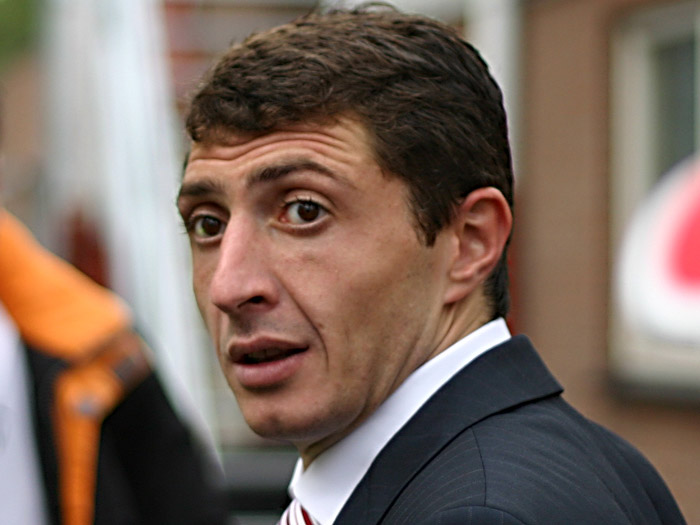
Shota Arveladze who holds the record for most goals with 26 scored in 61 appearances.

Updated to game played 5 October 2026.

=== Record by opponent ===
Georgia's first team has competed in a number of competitions and friendlies, and their record against each team faced in these competitions is listed below. Since their first official match against Lithuania in May 1990 Georgia have faced a total of 62 teams, they met their most recent different opponent, Andorra, for the first time in November 2018. The team that Georgia has met most is Albania, against whom they have contested 14 matches; having won eight of these Albania are also the side Georgia have beaten the most. Georgia have tied four games with Moldova, they are the team that they have drawn with the most. The team that has defeated Georgia the most are the Republic of Ireland, who have won nine of their ten matches with Georgia.

| Opponents | P | W | D | L | GF | GA | GD | Win % | First | Last |
|---|---|---|---|---|---|---|---|---|---|---|
| Albania | 15 | 8 | 4 | 3 | 23 | 13 | +10 | 53.33 | 1994 | 2022 |
| Andorra | 2 | 1 | 1 | 0 | 4 | 1 | +3 | 50.00 | 2018 | 2018 |
| Armenia | 9 | 5 | 2 | 2 | 23 | 9 | +14 | 55.56 | 1997 | 2025 |
| Austria | 2 | 0 | 1 | 1 | 2 | 3 | −1 | 0.00 | 2016 | 2017 |
| Azerbaijan | 6 | 2 | 2 | 2 | 8 | 6 | +2 | 33.33 | 1992 | 2007 |
| Bahrain | 1 | 1 | 0 | 0 | 2 | 0 | +2 | 100.00 | 2026 | 2026 |
| Belarus | 4 | 2 | 1 | 1 | 4 | 4 | +0 | 50.00 | 2012 | 2020 |
| Bosnia and Herzegovina | 1 | 1 | 0 | 0 | 1 | 0 | +1 | 100.00 | 2022 | 2022 |
| Bulgaria | 10 | 3 | 2 | 5 | 16 | 23 | −7 | 30.00 | 1994 | 2025 |
| Cameroon | 1 | 0 | 1 | 0 | 0 | 0 | +0 | 0.00 | 2010 | 2010 |
| Cape Verde | 1 | 0 | 1 | 0 | 1 | 1 | +0 | 0.00 | 2025 | 2025 |
| Croatia | 3 | 1 | 0 | 2 | 3 | 4 | −1 | 33.33 | 2011 | 2019 |
| Cyprus | 8 | 4 | 1 | 3 | 12 | 8 | +4 | 50.00 | 1992 | 2024 |
| Czech Republic | 1 | 0 | 0 | 1 | 1 | 2 | −1 | 0.00 | 2024 | 2024 |
| Denmark | 5 | 0 | 2 | 3 | 5 | 15 | −10 | 0.00 | 2004 | 2019 |
| Egypt | 1 | 0 | 1 | 0 | 0 | 0 | +0 | 0.00 | 2012 | 2012 |
| England | 2 | 0 | 0 | 2 | 0 | 4 | −4 | 0.00 | 1996 | 1997 |
| Estonia | 7 | 3 | 2 | 2 | 8 | 7 | +1 | 42.86 | 1998 | 2020 |
| Faroe Islands | 3 | 3 | 0 | 0 | 10 | 1 | +9 | 100.00 | 2006 | 2025 |
| Finland | 2 | 0 | 1 | 1 | 1 | 2 | −1 | 0.00 | 2012 | 2013 |
| France | 4 | 0 | 1 | 3 | 1 | 7 | −6 | 0.00 | 2007 | 2013 |
| Germany | 5 | 0 | 0 | 5 | 2 | 12 | −10 | 0.00 | 1995 | 2015 |
| Gibraltar | 4 | 4 | 0 | 0 | 13 | 1 | +12 | 100.00 | 2014 | 2022 |
| Greece | 10 | 0 | 3 | 7 | 6 | 17 | −11 | 0.00 | 1996 | 2024 |
| Hungary | 3 | 1 | 0 | 2 | 4 | 6 | −2 | 33.33 | 2001 | 2026 |
| Iceland | 1 | 0 | 0 | 1 | 1 | 3 | −2 | 0.00 | 2009 | 2009 |
| Iran | 1 | 0 | 0 | 1 | 1 | 2 | −1 | 0.00 | 2000 | 2000 |
| Israel | 7 | 1 | 3 | 3 | 6 | 8 | −2 | 14.29 | 1994 | 2026 |
| Italy | 8 | 0 | 1 | 7 | 2 | 14 | −12 | 0.00 | 1996 | 2009 |
| Jordan | 2 | 1 | 0 | 1 | 3 | 3 | +0 | 50.00 | 2005 | 2017 |
| Kazakhstan | 6 | 3 | 2 | 1 | 7 | 4 | +3 | 50.00 | 2005 | 2018 |
| Kosovo | 2 | 1 | 0 | 1 | 2 | 2 | +0 | 50.00 | 2021 | 2021 |
| Latvia | 10 | 5 | 2 | 3 | 18 | 10 | +8 | 50.00 | 1994 | 2018 |
| Lebanon | 2 | 0 | 0 | 2 | 4 | 7 | −3 | 0.00 | 1996 | 1996 |
| Liechtenstein | 1 | 1 | 0 | 0 | 2 | 0 | +2 | 100.00 | 2014 | 2014 |
| Lithuania | 9 | 5 | 1 | 3 | 15 | 6 | +9 | 55.56 | 1990 | 2026 |
| Luxembourg | 5 | 3 | 1 | 1 | 7 | 2 | +5 | 60.00 | 2001 | 2024 |
| Malta | 9 | 6 | 2 | 1 | 12 | 5 | +7 | 66.67 | 1994 | 2018 |
| Moldova | 12 | 4 | 4 | 4 | 17 | 14 | +3 | 33.33 | 1991 | 2017 |
| Mongolia | 1 | 1 | 0 | 0 | 6 | 1 | +5 | 100.00 | 2023 | 2023 |
| Montenegro | 3 | 1 | 1 | 1 | 4 | 3 | +1 | 33.33 | 2009 | 2024 |
| Morocco | 1 | 0 | 0 | 1 | 0 | 3 | −3 | 0.00 | 2022 | 2022 |
| New Zealand | 1 | 0 | 0 | 1 | 1 | 3 | −2 | 0.00 | 2006 | 2006 |
| Netherlands | 1 | 0 | 0 | 1 | 0 | 3 | −3 | 0.00 | 2021 | 2021 |
| Nigeria | 1 | 0 | 0 | 1 | 1 | 5 | −4 | 0.00 | 1994 | 1994 |
| Northern Ireland | 3 | 0 | 1 | 2 | 1 | 5 | −4 | 0.00 | 2008 | 2026 |
| North Macedonia | 3 | 1 | 1 | 1 | 3 | 2 | +1 | 33.33 | 2020 | 2022 |
| Norway | 5 | 0 | 1 | 4 | 3 | 9 | −6 | 0.00 | 1996 | 2023 |
| Paraguay | 1 | 0 | 0 | 1 | 0 | 1 | −1 | 0.00 | 2006 | 2006 |
| Poland | 5 | 1 | 0 | 4 | 4 | 13 | −9 | 20.00 | 1997 | 2015 |
| Portugal | 1 | 0 | 0 | 1 | 0 | 2 | −2 | 0.00 | 2008 | 2008 |
| Qatar | 1 | 1 | 0 | 0 | 2 | 1 | +1 | 100.00 | 2007 | 2007 |
| Republic of Ireland | 11 | 0 | 2 | 9 | 5 | 18 | −13 | 0.00 | 2003 | 2019 |
| Romania | 9 | 1 | 3 | 5 | 7 | 21 | −14 | 11.11 | 1996 | 2026 |
| Russia | 3 | 1 | 1 | 1 | 3 | 4 | −1 | 33.33 | 1998 | 2003 |
| Saudi Arabia | 1 | 1 | 0 | 0 | 2 | 0 | +2 | 100.00 | 2014 | 2014 |
| Saint Kitts and Nevis | 1 | 1 | 0 | 0 | 3 | 0 | +3 | 100.00 | 2017 | 2017 |
| Scotland | 6 | 2 | 1 | 3 | 6 | 7 | −1 | 33.33 | 2007 | 2023 |
| Serbia | 2 | 0 | 0 | 2 | 1 | 4 | −3 | 0.00 | 2017 | 2017 |
| Slovakia | 2 | 1 | 0 | 1 | 3 | 3 | +0 | 50.00 | 2000 | 2016 |
| Slovenia | 4 | 1 | 1 | 2 | 4 | 5 | −1 | 25.00 | 1994 | 2010 |
| South Africa | 1 | 1 | 0 | 0 | 4 | 1 | +3 | 100.00 | 2002 | 2002 |
| South Korea | 1 | 0 | 1 | 0 | 2 | 2 | +0 | 0.00 | 2019 | 2019 |
| Spain | 10 | 1 | 0 | 9 | 5 | 29 | −24 | 10.00 | 2012 | 2025 |
| Sweden | 2 | 1 | 0 | 1 | 2 | 1 | +1 | 50.00 | 2021 | 2021 |
| Switzerland | 3 | 0 | 1 | 2 | 1 | 6 | −5 | 0.00 | 2002 | 2019 |
| Thailand | 1 | 1 | 0 | 0 | 8 | 0 | +8 | 100.00 | 2023 | 2023 |
| Tunisia | 2 | 1 | 1 | 0 | 3 | 1 | +2 | 50.00 | 1994 | 1998 |
| Turkey | 7 | 1 | 1 | 5 | 8 | 19 | −11 | 14.29 | 2002 | 2025 |
| United Arab Emirates | 1 | 0 | 0 | 1 | 0 | 1 | −1 | 0.00 | 2014 | 2014 |
| Ukraine | 11 | 0 | 5 | 6 | 7 | 17 | −10 | 0.00 | 1998 | 2026 |
| Uruguay | 1 | 1 | 0 | 0 | 2 | 0 | +2 | 100.00 | 2006 | 2006 |
| Uzbekistan | 2 | 1 | 1 | 0 | 3 | 2 | +1 | 50.00 | 2017 | 2021 |
| Wales | 5 | 3 | 1 | 1 | 9 | 3 | +6 | 60.00 | 1994 | 2017 |

=== Record by competition ===
| Competition | P | W | D | L | GF | GA | GD | Win % | First | Last |
|---|---|---|---|---|---|---|---|---|---|---|
| Cyprus International Tournament | 6 | 2 | 1 | 3 | 6 | 10 | −4 | 33.33 | 2000 | 2004 |
| FIFA World Cup qualification | 69 | 12 | 18 | 39 | 63 | 114 | −51 | 17.39 | 1996 | 2025 |
| Friendly | 115 | 42 | 26 | 47 | 158 | 159 | −1 | 36.52 | 1990 | 2026 |
| Malta (Rothmans) International Tournament | 7 | 6 | 0 | 1 | 13 | 3 | +10 | 85.71 | 1994 | 2006 |
| UEFA European Championship qualifying | 75 | 19 | 13 | 43 | 77 | 111 | −34 | 25.33 | 1994 | 2024 |
| UEFA Nations League | 29 | 15 | 8 | 6 | 48 | 20 | +28 | 51.72 | 2018 | 2026 |
| UEFA European Championship | 4 | 1 | 1 | 2 | 5 | 9 | −4 | 25.00 | 2024 | 2024 |
| Total | 303 | 95 | 65 | 143 | 365 | 426 | −61 | 31.35 | 1990 | 2026 |

== See also ==
Georgia national football team results (2020–present)
