= Georgia national football team results (2020–present) =

This article provides details of international football games played by the Georgia national football team from 2020 to present.

== Results ==
Key
Win
Draw
Defeat

=== 2020 ===
5 September 2020–21 UEFA Nations League	Estonia	0–1	Georgia	Tallinn, Estonia
19:00 UTC+3		Report	Kacharava 32'	Stadium: A. Le Coq Arena; Attendance: 0 (Note: Due to the COVID-19 pandemic in Europe, all matches scheduled for September 2020 were played behind closed doors.); Referee: Donatas Rumšas (Lithuania)

8 September 2020–21 UEFA Nations League	Georgia	1–1	North Macedonia	Tbilisi, Georgia
20:00 UTC+4	Okriashvili 13' (pen.)	Report	Ristovski 33'	Stadium: Boris Paichadze Dinamo Arena; Attendance: 0 Referee: Peter Kjærsgaard-Andersen (Denmark)

8 October UEFA Euro 2020 Euro qualifying play-offs	Georgia	1–0	Belarus	Tbilisi, Georgia
20:00 UTC+4	Okriashvili 7' (pen.)	Report		Stadium: Boris Paichadze Dinamo Arena; Attendance: 0 (Note: The Georgia v Belarus match was played behind closed doors due to the COVID-19 pandemic in Georgia.); Referee: Cüneyt Çakır (Turkey)

11 October 2020–21 UEFA Nations League	Armenia	2–2	Georgia	Tychy, Poland
18:00 UTC+2	Bayramyan 6'; Mkhitaryan 89' (pen.)	Report	Kacharava 46'; Okriashvili 74'	Stadium: Tychy City Stadium (Note: The Armenia v Georgia match, originally scheduled to be played at Vazgen Sargsyan Republican Stadium, Yerevan, was later moved to the neutral Tychy City Stadium, Tychy, due to the Nagorno-Karabakh conflict.); Attendance: 0 Referee: Ivan Bebek (Croatia)

14 October 2020–21 UEFA Nations League	North Macedonia	1–1	Georgia	Skopje, North Macedonia
20:45 UTC+2	Alioski 90+3' (pen.)	Report	Kvaratskhelia 74'	Stadium: Toše Proeski Arena; Attendance: 0 Referee: Bartosz Frankowski (Poland)

12 November UEFA Euro 2020 Euro qualifying play-offs	Georgia	0–1	North Macedonia	Tbilisi, Georgia
21:00 UTC+4		Report	Pandev 56'	Stadium: Boris Paichadze Dinamo Arena; Attendance: 0 (Note: The Georgia v North Macedonia match was played behind closed doors due to the COVID-19 pandemic in Georgia.); Referee: Anthony Taylor (England)

15 November 2020–21 UEFA Nations League	Georgia	1–2	Armenia	Tbilisi, Georgia
21:00 UTC+4	Qazaishvili 65' (pen.)	Report	Ghazaryan 33'; Adamyan 86'	Stadium: Boris Paichadze Dinamo Arena; Attendance: 0 Referee: Marco Guida (Italy)

18 November 2020–21 UEFA Nations League	Georgia	0–0	Estonia	Tbilisi, Georgia
21:00 UTC+4		Report		Stadium: Boris Paichadze Dinamo Arena; Attendance: 0 Referee: Irfan Peljto (Bosnia and Herzegovina)

=== 2021 ===
25 March 2022 FIFA World Cup qualification	Sweden	1–0	Georgia	Solna, Sweden
20:45 UTC+1	Claesson 35'	Report		Stadium: Friends Arena; Attendance: 0 Referee: Benoît Bastien (France)

28 March 2022 FIFA World Cup qualification	Georgia	1–2	Spain	Tbilisi, Georgia
20:00 UTC+4	Kvaratskhelia 44'	Report	Torres 56'; Olmo 90+2'	Stadium: Boris Paichadze Dinamo Arena; Attendance: 16,200; Referee: Radu Petrescu (Romania)

31 March 2022 FIFA World Cup qualification	Greece	1–1	Georgia	Thessaloniki, Greece
21:45 UTC+3	Kakabadze 76' (o.g.)	Report	Kvaratskhelia 78'	Stadium: Toumba Stadium; Attendance: 0 Referee: Szymon Marciniak (Poland)

2 June Friendly	Romania	1–2	Georgia	Ploiești, Romania
22:15 UTC+3	Ivan 78'	Report	Mikautadze 61'; Aburjania 71'	Stadium: Ilie Oană; Attendance: 1,000; Referee: Anastasios Sidiropoulos (Greece)

6 June Friendly	Netherlands	3–0	Georgia	Enschede, Netherlands
18:00 UTC+2	Depay 10' (pen.); Weghorst 55'; Gravenberch 76'	Report		Stadium: De Grolsch Veste; Attendance: 7,500; Referee: Erik Lambrechts (Belgium)

2 September 2022 FIFA World Cup qualification	Georgia	0–1	Kosovo	Batumi, Georgia
20:00 UTC+2		Report	Muriqi 18'	Stadium: Batumi Stadium; Attendance: 122; Referee: Mykola Balakin (Ukraine)

5 September 2022 FIFA World Cup qualification	Spain	4–0	Georgia	Badajoz, Spain
20:45 UTC+2	Gayà 14'; Soler 25'; Torres 41'; Sarabia 63'	Report		Stadium: Nuevo Vivero; Attendance: 8,444; Referee: Tiago Martins (Portugal)

8 September Friendly	Bulgaria	4–1	Georgia	Sofia, Bulgaria
19:30 UTC+3	Nedelev 20'; D. Iliev 34' (pen.); Delev 44'; Hristov 53'	Report	Davitashvili 77'	Stadium: Vasil Levski National Stadium; Attendance: 504; Referee: Igor Stojchevski (North Macedonia)

9 October 2022 FIFA World Cup qualification	Georgia	0–2	Greece	Batumi, Georgia
20:00 UTC+2		Report	Bakasetas 90' (pen.); Pelkas 90+5'	Stadium: Batumi Stadium; Attendance: 0 Referee: Donatas Rumšas (Lithuania)

12 October 2022 FIFA World Cup qualification	Kosovo	1–2	Georgia	Pristina, Kosovo
20:45 UTC+2	Muriqi 45' (pen.)	Report	Okriashvili 11'; Davitashvili 82'	Stadium: Fadil Vokrri Stadium; Attendance: 3,550; Referee: Paweł Raczkowski (Poland)

11 November 2022 FIFA World Cup qualification	Georgia	2–0	Sweden	Batumi, Georgia
21:00 UTC+4	Kvaratskhelia 61', 77'	Report		Stadium: Batumi Stadium; Attendance: 6,800; Referee: Serdar Gözübüyük (Netherlands)

15 November Friendly	Georgia	1–0	Uzbekistan	Gori, Georgia
18:00 UTC+4	Volkovi 41'	Report		Stadium: Tengiz Burjanadze Stadium; Attendance: 1,300; Referee: Vitaliy Romanov (Ukraine)

=== 2022 ===
25 March Friendly	Bosnia and Herzegovina	0–1	Georgia	Zenica, Bosnia and Herzegovina
20:45 UTC+1		Report	Zivzivadze 49'	Stadium: Bilino Polje Stadium; Attendance: 1,500; Referee: Aleksandar Stavrev (North Macedonia)

29 March Friendly	Albania	0–0	Georgia	Tirana, Albania
18:00 UTC+2		Report		Stadium: Arena Kombëtare; Attendance: 19,000; Referee: Nikola Dabanović (Montenegro)

2 June 2022–23 UEFA Nations League	Georgia	4–0	Gibraltar	Tbilisi, Georgia
20:00 UTC+4	Kvaratskhelia 12'; Kashia 33'; Mikautadze 87'; Qazaishvili 88'	Report		Stadium: Boris Paichadze Dinamo Arena; Attendance: 43,412; Referee: Morten Krogh (Denmark)

5 June 2022–23 UEFA Nations League	Bulgaria	2–5	Georgia	Razgrad, Bulgaria
21:45 UTC+3	Iliev 50'; Stefanov 83'	Report	Davitashvili 4'; A. Hristov 31' (o.g.); Zivzivadze 52'; Kvaratskhelia 58' (pen.); Qazaishvili 69'	Stadium: Huvepharma Arena; Attendance: 3,600; Referee: Fabio Maresca (Italy)

9 June 2022–23 UEFA Nations League	North Macedonia	0–3	Georgia	Skopje, North Macedonia
20:45 UTC+2		Report	Zivzivadze 52'; Kvaratskhelia 62'; Kiteishvili 84'	Stadium: Toše Proeski Arena; Attendance: 10,775; Referee: Roi Reinshreiber (Israel)

12 June 2022–23 UEFA Nations League	Georgia	0–0	Bulgaria	Tbilisi, Georgia
20:00 UTC+4		Report		Stadium: Boris Paichadze Dinamo Arena; Attendance: 54,200; Referee: Espen Eskås (Norway)

23 September 2022–23 UEFA Nations League	Georgia	2–0	North Macedonia	Tbilisi, Georgia
20:00 UTC+4	Miovski 35' (o.g.); Kvaratskhelia 64'	Report		Stadium: Boris Paichadze Dinamo Arena; Attendance: 54,200; Referee: Ivan Kružliak (Slovakia)

26 September 2022–23 UEFA Nations League	Gibraltar	1–2	Georgia	Gibraltar
20:45 UTC+2	Annesley 75'	Report	Kvaratskhelia 19' (pen.); Tsitaishvili 48'	Stadium: Victoria Stadium; Attendance: 1,199; Referee: Rob Harvey (Republic of Ireland)

17 November Friendly	Morocco	3–0	Georgia	Sharjah, United Arab Emirates
20:00 UTC+4	En-Nesyri 5'; Ziyech 29'; Boufal 72' (pen.)	Report		Stadium: Sharjah Stadium; Referee: Adel Al Naqbi (United Arab Emirates)

=== 2023 ===
25 March Friendly	Georgia	6–1	Mongolia	Batumi, Georgia
18:00	Volkovi 15'; Chakvetadze 56', 58'; Lobzhanidze 70'; Beridze 88'; Zivzivadze 90+1'	Report	Batbold 31'	Stadium: Batumi Stadium; Attendance: 8,000; Referee: Zaven Hovhannisyan (Armenia)

28 March UEFA Euro 2024 qualifying	Georgia	1–1	Norway	Batumi, Georgia
18:00	Mikautadze 60'	Report	Sørloth 15'	Stadium: Batumi Stadium; Attendance: 20,300; Referee: Andris Treimanis (Latvia)

17 June UEFA Euro 2024 qualifying	Cyprus	1–2	Georgia	Larnaca, Cyprus
20:45	Pittas 40' (pen.)	Report	Mikautadze 31'; Davitashvili 84'	Stadium: AEK Arena – Georgios Karapatakis; Attendance: 3,763; Referee: Fábio Veríssimo (Portugal)

20 June UEFA Euro 2024 qualifying	Scotland	2–0	Georgia	Glasgow, Scotland
20:45	McGregor 6'; McTominay 47'	Report		Stadium: Hampden Park; Attendance: 50,062; Referee: István Vad (Hungary)

8 September UEFA Euro 2024 qualifying	Georgia	1–7	Spain	Tbilisi, Georgia
18:00	Chakvetadze 49'	Report	Morata 22', 40', 66'; Kvirkvelia 28' (o.g.); Olmo 38'; Williams 68'; Yamal 74'	Stadium: Boris Paichadze Dinamo Arena; Attendance: 51,694; Referee: Daniel Siebert (Germany)

12 September UEFA Euro 2024 qualifying	Norway	2–1	Georgia	Oslo, Norway
20:45	Haaland 25'; Ødegaard 33'	Report	Zivzivadze 90+1'	Stadium: Ullevaal Stadion; Attendance: 23,665; Referee: Nikola Dabanović (Montenegro)

12 October Friendly	Georgia	8–0	Thailand	Tbilisi, Georgia
20:00	Davitashvili 9', 43'; Lochoshvili 12'; Mikautadze 24', 37', 41', 56' (pen.); Kvaratskhelia 66'	Report		Stadium: Mikheil Meskhi Stadium; Attendance: 9,274; Referee: Rohit Saggi (Norway)

15 October UEFA Euro 2024 qualifying	Georgia	4–0	Cyprus	Tbilisi, Georgia
15:00	Kiteishvili 46'; Kvaratskhelia 58'; Shengelia 82'; Mikautadze 90+5' (pen.)	Report		Stadium: Mikheil Meskhi Stadium; Attendance: 15,871; Referee: Robert Jones (England)

16 November UEFA Euro 2024 qualifying	Georgia	2–2	Scotland	Tbilisi, Georgia
18:00	Kvaratskhelia 15', 57'	Report	McTominay 49'; Shankland 90+3'	Stadium: Boris Paichadze Dinamo Arena; Attendance: 44,595; Referee: Aleksandar Stavrev (North Macedonia)

19 November UEFA Euro 2024 qualifying	Spain	3–1	Georgia	Valladolid, Spain
20:45	Le Normand 4'; Torres 55'; Lochoshvili 72' (o.g.)	Report	Kvaratskhelia 10'	Stadium: José Zorrilla; Attendance: 24,146; Referee: Ovidiu Hațegan (Romania)

=== 2024 ===
21 March UEFA Euro 2024 qualifying play-offs	Georgia	2–0	Luxembourg	Tbilisi, Georgia
21:00	Zivzivadze 40', 63'	Report		Stadium: Boris Paichadze Dinamo Arena; Attendance: 51,404; Referee: José María Sánchez Martínez (Spain)

26 March UEFA Euro 2024 qualifying play-offs	Georgia	0–0 (a.e.t.) (4–2 p)	Greece	Tbilisi, Georgia
21:00		Report		Stadium: Boris Paichadze Dinamo Arena; Attendance: 44,000; Referee: Szymon Marciniak (Poland)
	Penalties
	Kochorashvili (penalty scored); Davitashvili (penalty scored); Mikautadze (penalty missed); Dvali (penalty scored); Kvekveskiri (penalty scored)		(penalty missed) Bakasetas; (penalty scored) Masouras; (penalty scored) Bouchalakis; (penalty missed) Giakoumakis

9 June Friendly	Montenegro	1–3	Georgia	Podgorica, Montenegro
20:45	Jovetić 66'	Report	Kiteishvili 10'; Mikautadze 33'; Zivzivadze 83'	Stadium: Podgorica City Stadium; Attendance: 2,942; Referee: Aleksandar Stavrev (North Macedonia)

18 June UEFA Euro 2024 Group F	Turkey	3–1	Georgia	Dortmund, Germany
18:00	Müldür 25'; Güler 65'; Aktürkoğlu 90+7'	Report	Mikautadze 32'	Stadium: Westfalenstadion; Attendance: 59,127; Referee: Facundo Tello (Argentina)

22 June UEFA Euro 2024 Group F	Georgia	1–1	Czech Republic	Hamburg, Germany
15:00	Mikautadze 45+4' (pen.)	Report	Schick 59'	Stadium: Volksparkstadion; Attendance: 46,524; Referee: Daniel Siebert (Germany)

26 June UEFA Euro 2024 Group F	Georgia	2–0	Portugal	Gelsenkirchen, Germany
21:00	Kvaratskhelia 2'; Mikautadze 57' (pen.)	Report		Stadium: Arena AufSchalke; Attendance: 49,616; Referee: Sandro Schärer (Switzerland)

30 June UEFA Euro 2024 Round of 16	Spain	4–1	Georgia	Cologne, Germany
21:00 UTC+2	Rodri 39'; Ruiz 51'; Williams 75'; Olmo 83'	Report	Le Normand 18' (o.g.)	Stadium: RheinEnergieStadion; Attendance: 42,233; Referee: François Letexier (France)

7 September 2024–25 UEFA Nations League	Georgia	4–1	Czech Republic	Tbilisi, Georgia
20:00	Kvaratskhelia 33' (pen.); Chakvetadze 53'; Mikautadze 63'; Kochorashvili 66'	Report	Kalvach 80'	Stadium: Mikheil Meskhi Stadium; Attendance: 20,401; Referee: Orel Grinfeld (Israel)

10 September 2024–25 UEFA Nations League	Albania	0–1	Georgia	Tirana, Albania
20:45		Report	Kochorashvili 71'	Stadium: Arena Kombëtare; Attendance: 20,400; Referee: Erik Lambrechts (Belgium)

11 October 2024–25 UEFA Nations League	Ukraine	1–0	Georgia	Poznań, Poland (Note: Due to the Russian invasion of Ukraine, Ukraine are required to play their home matches at neutral venues until further notice.)
20:45	Mudryk 35'	Report		Stadium: Poznań Stadium; Attendance: 21,700; Referee: Julian Weinberger (Austria)

14 October 2024–25 UEFA Nations League	Georgia	0–1	Albania	Tbilisi, Georgia
20:00		Report	Asllani 48'	Stadium: Mikheil Meskhi Stadium; Attendance: 19,981; Referee: Danny Makkelie (Netherlands)

16 November 2024–25 UEFA Nations League	Georgia	1–1	Ukraine	Batumi, Georgia
21:00	Mikautadze 76'	Report	Kvirkvelia 7' (o.g.)	Stadium: Adjarabet Arena; Attendance: 19,120; Referee: Chris Kavanagh (England)

19 November 2024–25 UEFA Nations League	Czech Republic	2–1	Georgia	Olomouc, Czech Republic
20:45	Šulc 3'; Hložek 24'	Report	Mikautadze 60'	Stadium: Andrův stadion Attendance: 12,221; Referee: Anastasios Papapetrou (Greece)

=== 2025 ===
20 March 2024–25 UEFA Nations League relegation play-offs	Armenia	0–3	Georgia	Yerevan, Armenia
21:00		Report	Kochorashvili 33'; Mikautadze 37', 59'	Stadium: Vazgen Sargsyan Republican Stadium; Attendance: 14,414; Referee: Radu Petrescu (Romania)

23 March 2024–25 UEFA Nations League relegation play-offs	Georgia	6–1 (9–1 agg.)	Armenia	Tbilisi, Georgia
18:00	Haroyan 4' (o.g.); Mikautadze 14', 35'; Chakvetadze 23'; Kiteishvili 27'; Kvaratskhelia 62'	Report	Sevikyan 48'	Stadium: Boris Paichadze Dinamo Arena; Attendance: 47,903; Referee: Anthony Taylor (England)

5 June Friendly	Georgia	1–0	Faroe Islands	Tbilisi, Georgia
20:00	Lochoshvili 9'	Report		Stadium: Boris Paichadze Dinamo Arena; Attendance: 17,645; Referee: Jasper Vergoote (Belgium)

8 June Friendly	Georgia	1–1	Cape Verde	Kutaisi, Georgia
20:00	Lobzhanidze 45+1'	Report	Mendes 80' (pen.)	Stadium: Ramaz Shengelia Stadium; Attendance: 9,940; Referee: Henrik Nalbandyan (Armenia)

4 September 2026 FIFA World Cup qualification	Georgia	2–3	Turkey	Tbilisi, Georgia
20:00	Davitashvili 63'; Kvaratskhelia 90+8'	Report	Müldür 3'; Aktürkoğlu 41', 52'	Stadium: Boris Paichadze Dinamo Arena; Attendance: 44,238; Referee: Davide Massa (Italy)

7 September 2026 FIFA World Cup qualification	Georgia	3–0	Bulgaria	Tbilisi, Georgia
17:00	Kvaratskhelia 30'; N. Gagnidze 44'; Mikautadze 65'	Report		Stadium: Boris Paichadze Dinamo Arena; Attendance: 44,077; Referee: Glenn Nyberg (Sweden)

11 October 2026 FIFA World Cup qualification	Spain	2–0	Georgia	Elche, Spain
20:45	Pino 24'; Oyarzabal 64'	Report		Stadium: Estadio Martínez Valero; Attendance: 28,661; Referee: Manfredas Lukjančukas (Lithuania)

14 October 2026 FIFA World Cup qualification	Turkey	4–1	Georgia	İzmit, Turkey
21:45	Yıldız 14'; Demiral 22', 52'; Akgün 35'	Report	Kochorashvili 64'	Stadium: Kocaeli Stadium; Attendance: 26,633; Referee: Radu Petrescu (Romania)

15 November 2026 FIFA World Cup qualification	Georgia	0–4	Spain	Tbilisi, Georgia
21:00		Report	Oyarzabal 11' (pen.), 63'; Zubimendi 22'; Torres 35'	Stadium: Boris Paichadze Dinamo Arena; Attendance: 44,314; Referee: Benoît Bastien (France)

18 November 2026 FIFA World Cup qualification	Bulgaria	2–1	Georgia	Sofia, Bulgaria
21:45	Rusev 10'; Krastev 24'	Report	Lochoshvili 88'	Stadium: Vasil Levski National Stadium; Attendance: 1,980; Referee: Jakob Kehlet (Denmark)

=== 2026 ===
26 March Friendly	Georgia	2–2	Israel	Tbilisi, Georgia
20:00 UTC+4	Kvaratskhelia 36', 54'	Report	Mizrahi 60'; Gandelman 64'	Stadium: Mikheil Meskhi Stadium; Attendance: 16,556; Referee: Julian Weinberger (Austria)

29 March Friendly	Lithuania	0–2	Georgia	Kaunas, Lithuania
16:00 UTC+3		Report	Mikautadze 70' (pen.), 84'	Stadium: Darius and Girėnas Stadium; Attendance: 7,726; Referee: Vitālijs Spasjoņņikovs (Latvia)

2 June Friendly	Georgia	1–1	Romania	Tbilisi, Georgia
21:00 UTC+4	Kvilitaia 46'	Report	Munteanu 55'	Stadium: Mikheil Meskhi Stadium; Attendance: 14,702; Referee: Mohammed Al Mazeed (Qatar)

5 June Friendly	Georgia	2–0	Bahrain	Tbilisi, Georgia
20:00 UTC+4	Lochoshvili 52'; Kvaratskhelia 77' (pen.)	Report		Stadium: Mikheil Meskhi Stadium; Attendance: 10,997; Referee: Duncan Nicolson (Scotland)

25 September 2026–27 UEFA Nations League	Georgia	0–1	Northern Ireland	Tbilisi, Georgia
20:00 UTC+4		Report	Charles 90+9'	Stadium: Boris Paichadze Dinamo Arena; Attendance: 7,470; Referee: Orel Grinfeeld (Israel)

28 September 2026–27 UEFA Nations League	Georgia	0–0	Ukraine	Tbilisi, Georgia
20:00 UTC+4		Report		Stadium: Boris Paichadze Dinamo Arena; Attendance: 43,382; Referee: Aliyar Aghayev (Azerbaijan)

2 October 2026–27 UEFA Nations League	Hungary	1–0	Georgia	Budapest, Hungary
20:45 UTC+2	Kerkez 35'	Report		Stadium: Puskás Aréna; Attendance: 52,870; Referee: Srđan Jovanović (Serbia)

5 October 2026–27 UEFA Nations League	Northern Ireland	0–0	Georgia	Belfast, Northern Ireland
19:45 UTC+1		Report		Stadium: Windsor Park; Attendance: 18,140; Referee: Sebastian Gishamer (Austria)

14 November 2026–27 UEFA Nations League	Georgia	0–2	Hungary	Tbilisi, Georgia
21:00 UTC+4		Report	Dvali 73' (o.g.); Varga 85'	Stadium: Boris Paichadze Dinamo Arena; Attendance: 19,187; Referee: Ondřej Berka (Czech Republic)

17 November 2026–27 UEFA Nations League	Ukraine	1–0	Georgia	Košice, Slovakia
21:45 UTC+2	Sikan 1'	Report		Stadium: Košická futbalová aréna Attendance: 5,400; Referee: Martin Matoša (Slovenia)

== See also ==
- Georgia national football team results (1990–2019)
