= Tornike Okriashvili =

Georgian footballer

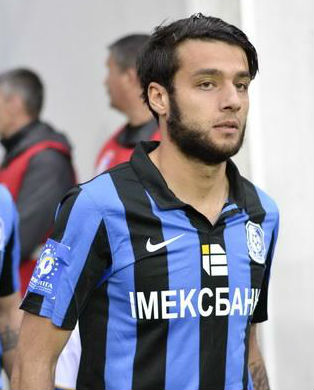
- Okriashvili with Chornomorets Odesa in 2014

Personal information
- Date of birth: 12 February 1992 (age 34)
- Place of birth: Tbilisi, Georgia
- Height: 1.81 m (5 ft 11 in)
- Position: Attacking midfielder

Team information
- Current team: Gagra
- Number: 10

Youth career
- –2008: Olimpi Rustavi
- 2008–2009: Gagra

Senior career*
Years	Team	Apps	(Gls)
2009–2010	Gagra	23	(0)
2010	→ Shakhtar Donetsk (loan)	0	(0)
2011–2014	Shakhtar Donetsk	0	(0)
2011–2013	→ Illichivets Mariupol (loan)	57	(4)
2014	→ Chornomorets Odesa (loan)	10	(3)
2014–2016	Genk	34	(2)
2016	→ Eskişehirspor (loan)	12	(2)
2016–2018	Krasnodar	16	(2)
2018	→ Krasnodar-2	4	(1)
2019–2021	Anorthosis Famagusta	34	(12)
2021–2022	APOEL	23	(3)
2023	Gagra	3	(0)
2024	Dinamo Tbilisi	8	(0)
2025–	Gagra	8	(0)

International career^{‡}
2009–2010	Georgia U19	5	(3)
2009–2012	Georgia U21	15	(2)
2010–2021	Georgia	50	(13)
- * Club domestic league appearances and goals as of 31 May 2025 ‡ National team caps and goals as of 29 January 2024

Tornike Okriashvili (Georgian: თორნიკე ოქრიაშვილი, pronounced [tʰoɾnikʼe okʰɾiaʃʷili], born 12 February 1992) is a Georgian professional footballer who plays for the Erovnuli Liga club Gagra. He plays mainly as an attacking midfielder but also can play as a winger.

== Club career ==
Okriashvili was 16 years old when he signed a first professional contract with Gagra. On 14 May 2010, he scored his first top-division goal in a 4–1 win over Tskhinvali.

He signed with Russian Premier League side FC Krasnodar on 6 September 2016. His time with Krasnodar was marred by injuries and he was released from his contract by mutual consent on 17 December 2018.

He signed with Anorthosis Famagusta in 2019. In May 2021, Okriashvili played 120 minutes in full in a Cypriot Cup final against Olympiakos Nicosia and clinched the title.

He moved to APOEL on 3 June 2021.

On 15 July 2022, Jeonbuk Hyundai Motors announced that Okriashvili had a signed contract. On 1 August 2022, Jeonbuk Hyundai Motors announced that Okriashvili's contract was officially terminated by mutual consent due to medical test issue.

In February 2023, he returned to the Georgian league to play for his boyhood club Gagra.

On 6 April 2024, Dinamo Tbilisi announced the signing of Okriashvili on a contract until the end of the season.

In February 2025, Okriashvili rejoined Gagra on his third spell.

== Career statistics ==
=== Club ===
As of 29 May 2025

Appearances and goals by club, season and competition
Club	Season	League			Cup		Continental		Total	
Club	Season	Division	Apps	Goals	Apps	Goals	Apps	Goals	Apps	Goals
Gagra	2008–09	Erovnuli Liga	1	0	0	0	–		1	0
Gagra	2009–10	Erovnuli Liga	22	1	1	0	–		23	1
Gagra	2023	Erovnuli Liga	3	0	–		–		3	0
Gagra	2025	Erovnuli Liga	8	0	–		–		8	0
Gagra	Total		34	1	1	0	0	0	35	1
Illichivets Mariupol	2010–11	Ukrainian Premier League	10	0	0	0	–		10	0
Illichivets Mariupol	2011–12	Ukrainian Premier League	9	0	1	1	–		10	1
Illichivets Mariupol	2012–13	Ukrainian Premier League	28	4	1	0	–		29	4
Illichivets Mariupol	2013–14	Ukrainian Premier League	10	0	1	0	–		11	0
Illichivets Mariupol	Total		57	4	3	1	0	0	60	5
Chornomorets Odesa	2013–14	Ukrainian Premier League	10	3	2	0	2	0	14	3
Genk	2014–15	Belgian First Division A	23	2	1	0	–		24	2
Genk	2015–16	Belgian First Division A	11	0	1	0	–		12	0
Genk	Total		34	2	2	0	0	0	36	2
Eskişehirspor	2015–16	Süper Lig	12	2	2	0	–		14	2
Krasnodar	2016–17	Russian Premier League	11	1	2	0	0	0	13	1
Krasnodar	2017–18	Russian Premier League	3	1	1	0	0	0	4	1
Krasnodar	2018–19	Russian Premier League	2	0	0	0	1	1	3	1
Krasnodar	Total		16	2	3	0	1	1	20	3
Krasnodar-2	2018–19	Russian National Football League	4	1	–		–		4	1
Anorthosis	2019–20	Cypriot First Division	14	3	2	1	–		16	4
Anorthosis	2020–21	Cypriot First Division	20	9	4	0	1	0	25	9
Anorthosis	Total		34	12	6	1	1	0	41	13
APOEL	2021–22	Cypriot First Division	24	3	3	0	–		27	3
Dinamo Tbilisi	2024	Erovnuli Liga	3	0	0	0	0	0	3	0
Career total			228	30	22	2	4	1	254	33

=== International ===
Scores and results list Georgia's goal tally first, score column indicates score after each Okriashvili goal.

List of international goals scored by Tornike Okriashvili
No.	Date	Venue	Opponent	Score	Result	Competition
1	7 September 2012	Boris Paichadze Dinamo Arena, Tbilisi, Georgia	Belarus	1–0	1–0	2014 FIFA World Cup qualification
2	29 May 2014	Estadio Municipal de Chapín, Jerez de la Frontera, Spain	Saudi Arabia	1–0	2–0	Friendly
3	7 September 2014	Boris Paichadze Dinamo Arena, Tbilisi, Georgia	Republic of Ireland	1–1	1–2	UEFA Euro 2016 qualification
4	14 October 2014	Estádio Algarve, Faro/Loulé, Portugal	Gibraltar	2–0	3–0	UEFA Euro 2016 qualification
5	8 October 2015	Boris Paichadze Dinamo Arena, Tbilisi, Georgia	Gibraltar	2–0	4–0	UEFA Euro 2016 qualification
6	29 March 2016	Boris Paichadze Dinamo Arena, Tbilisi, Georgia	Kazakhstan	1–1	1–1	Friendly
7	7 June 2016	Coliseum Alfonso Pérez, Getafe, Spain	Spain	1–0	1–0	Friendly
8	8 October 2016	Cardiff City Stadium, Cardiff, Wales	Wales	1–1	1–1	2018 FIFA World Cup qualification
9	9 September 2018	Boris Paichadze Dinamo Arena, Tbilisi, Georgia	Latvia	1–0	1–0	2018–19 UEFA Nations League D
10	8 September 2020	Boris Paichadze Dinamo Arena, Tbilisi, Georgia	North Macedonia	1–0	1–1	2020–21 UEFA Nations League C
11	8 October 2020	Boris Paichadze Dinamo Arena, Tbilisi, Georgia	Belarus	1–0	1–0	UEFA Euro 2020 qualifying play-offs
12	11 October 2020	Tychy Stadium, Tychy, Poland	Armenia	2–1	2–2	2020–21 UEFA Nations League C

== Honours ==
=== Team ===
Anorthosis: 2020–21 Cypriot Cup

=== Individual ===
Georgian Footballer of the Year: 2016
