= Levan Kobiashvili =

Georgian footballer (born 1977)

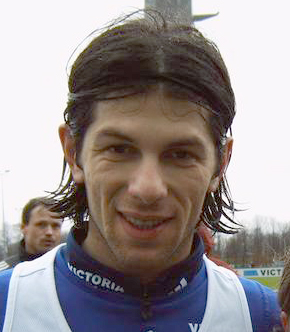
- Kobiashvili with Schalke 04 in 2005

Personal information
- Date of birth: 10 July 1977 (age 49)
- Place of birth: Tbilisi, Soviet Union
- Height: 1.83 m (6 ft 0 in)
- Positions: Left-back; midfielder

Youth career
- 1983–1992: Avaza Tbilisi
- 1992–1993: Gorda Rustavi

Senior career*
| Years | Team | Apps | (Gls) |
| 1993–1994 | Gorda Rustavi | 48 | (0) |
| 1995–1998 | Dinamo Tbilisi | 36 | (3) |
| 1997 | → Alania Vladikavkaz (loan) | 21 | (5) |
| 1998 | → SC Freiburg (loan) | 15 | (1) |
| 1998–2003 | SC Freiburg | 149 | (30) |
| 2003–2010 | Schalke 04 | 168 | (9) |
| 2010–2014 | Hertha BSC | 105 | (7) |
| Total | | 542 | (55) |

International career
| 1994 | Georgia U17 | 2 | (0) |
| 1995 | Georgia U21 | 1 | (0) |
| 1996–2011 | Georgia | 100 | (12) |
- * Club domestic league appearances and goals

Levan Kobiashvili (Georgian: ლევან კობიაშვილი, born 10 July 1977) is a Georgian former professional footballer. He is the current president of the Georgian Football Federation and a member of the Parliament of Georgia.

He played primarily as a left-back or as a left or central midfielder. During his career, he played for Gorda Rustavi, Dinamo Tbilisi, Alania Vladikavkaz and three German clubs: SC Freiburg, Schalke 04 and Hertha BSC.

Kobiashvili is the third-most-capped player for the Georgian national team, earning 100 caps for his home country.

In October 2015, Kobiashvili was elected president of the Georgian Football Federation. In 2016, he was elected as a member of Parliament of Georgia.

== Club career ==
=== Early career ===
Kobiashvili began his career in hometown club Avaza Tbilisi. His first professional club was Gorda Rustavi where he made his debut in the Umaglesi Liga in 1993. After spending two years with the Rustavi-based club, Kobiashvili moved to Dinamo Tbilisi in 1995. Under the guidance of famous former player and then-Dinamo coach David Kipiani, Kobiashvili became one of the key players of the club.

At the start of the year 1997, Alania Vladikavkaz declared their interest in Georgian midfielder. Dinamo Tbilisi let Kobiashvili leave the club on a season long loan deal. Kobiashvili joined a few of his compatriots there, including Mikheil Ashvetia, Giorgi Gakhokidze and Kakhaber Tskhadadze. He made 21 appearances for the club, scoring five goals in Russian Top League. Kobiashvili played in the UEFA Cup as well, scoring a single goal (against Dnipro Dnipropetrovsk) in four appearances.

=== Moving to Germany ===
After spending a half season on a loan at SC Freiburg, Kobi signed a deal with the German club in 1998. During his spell with the Breisgau-Brasilianer ("Breisgau Brazilians"), Kobiashvili became one of the key players of Volker Finke's system. He was joined some Georgian players in Germany as well, Alexander Iashvili and Levan Tskitishvili his teammates in Freiburg.

SC Freiburg finished sixth in the 2000–01 Bundesliga season which granted them a qualification for 2001–02 UEFA Cup. This was the second time the club has ever participated in a UEFA tournament. SC Freiburg were eliminated in the third round by the future champions Feyenoord, on a 3–2 aggregate loss. Kobiashvili played all six games of the club during the tournament, scoring the only goal against the Rotterdam-based club. Eventually Freiburg got relegated from Bundesliga.

Kobiashvili decided to stay at the club and helped team to get another promotion to the top tier again during the following season. He scored ten goals for the club.

=== Schalke 04 ===
During summer 2003, Kobiashvili's contract with Freiburg expired and he decided to leave the club. He received an offer from the future UEFA Cup winners CSKA Moscow. The coach of the Russian team, Valeri Gazzaev, was interested in signing the Georgian midfielder with whom he worked in Alania five years earlier. However, Kobiashvili decided to stay in Germany and signed a three-year deal with Schalke 04.

Kobiashvili became the starting member of his new club during the first season. Schalke coach Jupp Heynckes used him as a left-back. Upon the arrival of Ralf Rangnick, Kobiashvili was moved back to midfield, becoming one of the key links between Schalke's defence and attack. Two years after joining the Gelsenkirchen-based team, Kobiashvili extended the contract with the club until 2010. Schalke general manager Rudi Assauer declared that Kobiashvili was one of the best signings they had made in the last decade.

One of the best games of Kobiashvili's career came against PSV Eindhoven in 2005–06 UEFA Champions League season where he scored a hat-trick. Two of them were from penalty kicks. After the game he was praised by the manager Ralf Rangnick and teammate Frank Rost, who labeled Kobiashvili as a true professional, who was an example for them. Later this season, Schalke moved to the UEFA Cup, where the team reached semi-finals and lost to the eventual champions FC Sevilla.

During his career with Schalke, Kobiashvili won three titles: the DFL-Ligapokal in 2005 and the UEFA Intertoto Cup in 2003 and 2004.

On 20 December 2009, he announced he would be leaving FC Schalke 04 to transfer to Hertha BSC. He joined his new club on 1 January 2010.

=== Hertha BSC ===
Kobiashvili completed a move to Hertha BSC in 2010, although the negotiations began a few weeks earlier.

==== Suspension ====
During a relegation playoff game against 2. Bundesliga team Fortuna Düsseldorf, Kobiashvili punched referee Wolfgang Stark after the final whistle. Hertha lost the playoff 4–3 on aggregate goals and was relegated from the Bundesliga as a result. Kobiashvili was banned for one year, retroactively beginning 16 May 2012. The German Football Association later reduced Kobiashvili's suspension for seven and a half months, to end 31 December 2012.

== International career ==
In September 1996, Kobiashvili made his debut for Georgia in a friendly game against Norway in Oslo.

In 2011, Kobiashvili became his country's first 100-cap player and received a special award from the UEFA. That game against Greece was the last for Kobiashvili's international career. He is still the most-capped Georgian player. Kobiashvili captained the national team for 16 times and has scored 12 goals during his international career. Two of them were scored in a famous win against Uruguay in 2006. Kobiashvili has also scored the winning goal against Croatia in the UEFA Euro 2012 qualifier in 2011.

Kobiashvili has declared once that the national team was the top priority for him and he dreamed of playing at the FIFA World Cup or a UEFA European Championship.

Kobiashvili was named twice Georgian Footballer of the Year, in 2000 and 2005.

== Post-playing career ==
On 4 October 2015, he was elected president of the Georgian Football Federation.

In 2016, Kobiashvili was elected as a member of Parliament of Georgia.

== Personal life ==
Kobiashvili is married to Tamuna Tsuleiskiri. They have two children: Nikoloz (b. 1999) and Salome (b. 2007).

Kobiashvili and his fund, Kobi and Friends, donated 10,000 GEL in support of the victims of Tbilisi flood in 2015.

== Career statistics ==
=== Club ===
Appearances and goals by club, season and competition
| Club | Season | League | | | Cup | | Europe | | Other | | Total | |
| Club | Season | Division | Apps | Goals | Apps | Goals | Apps | Goals | Apps | Goals | Apps | Goals |
|---|---|---|---|---|---|---|---|---|---|---|---|---|
| Olimpi Rustavi | 1993–94 | Umaglesi Liga | 23 | 0 | | | – | | – | | 23 | 0 |
| Olimpi Rustavi | 1994–95 | Umaglesi Liga | 25 | 0 | | | – | | – | | 25 | 0 |
| Olimpi Rustavi | Total | | 48 | 0 | | | – | | – | | 48 | 0 |
| Dinamo Tbilisi | 1995–96 | Umaglesi Liga | 27 | 0 | | | 2 | 0 | – | | 29 | 0 |
| Dinamo Tbilisi | 1996–97 | Umaglesi Liga | 7 | 3 | | | 6 | 0 | – | | 13 | 3 |
| Dinamo Tbilisi | 1998–99 | Umaglesi Liga | 2 | 0 | | | 3 | 0 | – | | 5 | 0 |
| Dinamo Tbilisi | Total | | 36 | 3 | | | 11 | 0 | – | | 47 | 3 |
| Alania Vladikavkaz (loan) | 1997 | Russian Top League | 21 | 5 | | | 3 | 1 | – | | 24 | 6 |
| SC Freiburg (loan) | 1997–98 | 2. Bundesliga | 15 | 1 | 0 | 0 | – | | – | | 15 | 1 |
| SC Freiburg | 1998–99 | Bundesliga | 26 | 3 | 1 | 0 | – | | – | | 27 | 3 |
| SC Freiburg | 1999–2000 | Bundesliga | 33 | 6 | 4 | 1 | – | | – | | 37 | 7 |
| SC Freiburg | 2000–01 | Bundesliga | 31 | 7 | 4 | 2 | – | | – | | 35 | 9 |
| SC Freiburg | 2001–02 | Bundesliga | 31 | 4 | 2 | 1 | 6 | 1 | 1 (Note: Appearance(s) in the DFL-Ligapokal) | 0 | 40 | 6 |
| SC Freiburg | 2002–03 | 2. Bundesliga | 28 | 10 | 3 | 0 | – | | – | | 31 | 10 |
| SC Freiburg | Total | | 164 | 31 | 14 | 4 | 6 | 1 | 1 | 0 | 185 | 36 |
| Schalke 04 | 2003–04 | Bundesliga | 29 | 0 | 1 | 0 | 3 | 0 | 5 (Note: Appearances in UI Cup) | 0 | 38 | 0 |
| Schalke 04 | 2004–05 | Bundesliga | 32 | 3 | 5 | 0 | 8 | 3 | 5 | 0 | 50 | 6 |
| Schalke 04 | 2005–06 | Bundesliga | 32 | 1 | 1 | 0 | 13 | 4 | 2 | 0 | 48 | 5 |
| Schalke 04 | 2006–07 | Bundesliga | 29 | 3 | 1 | 0 | 1 | 0 | 2 | 0 | 33 | 3 |
| Schalke 04 | 2007–08 | Bundesliga | 13 | 1 | 2 | 0 | 5 | 0 | 3 | 1 | 23 | 2 |
| Schalke 04 | 2008–09 | Bundesliga | 29 | 0 | 3 | 0 | 5 | 0 | – | | 37 | 0 |
| Schalke 04 | 2009–10 | Bundesliga | 4 | 1 | 0 | 0 | – | | – | | 4 | 1 |
| Schalke 04 | Total | | 168 | 9 | 13 | 0 | 35 | 7 | 17 | 1 | 233 | 17 |
| Hertha BSC | 2009–10 | Bundesliga | 16 | 0 | 0 | 0 | 1 | 0 | – | | 17 | 0 |
| Hertha BSC | 2010–11 | 2. Bundesliga | 32 | 3 | 2 | 0 | – | | – | | 34 | 3 |
| Hertha BSC | 2011–12 | Bundesliga | 31 | 2 | 3 | 0 | – | | 2 (Note: Appearances in Bundesliga relegation play-offs) | 0 | 36 | 2 |
| Hertha BSC | 2012–13 | 2. Bundesliga | 11 | 1 | 0 | 0 | – | | – | | 11 | 1 |
| Hertha BSC | 2013–14 | Bundesliga | 15 | 1 | 0 | 0 | – | | – | | 15 | 1 |
| Hertha BSC | Total | | 105 | 7 | 5 | 0 | 1 | 0 | 2 | 0 | 113 | 7 |
| Career total | | | 542 | 55 | 32 | 4 | 56 | 9 | 20 | 1 | 650 | 69 |

=== International ===
Scores and results list Georgia's goal tally first, score column indicates score after each Kobiashvili goal.

List of international goals scored by Levan Kobiashvili
| No. | Date | Venue | Opponent | Score | Result | Competition |
|---|---|---|---|---|---|---|
| 1 | 6 June 2001 | Népstadion, Budapestary, Hung | Hungary | 1–4 | 1–4 | 2002 FIFA World Cup qualification |
| 2 | 27 March 2002 | Mikheil Meskhi Stadium, Tbilisi, Georgia | South Africa | 1–0 | 4–1 | Friendly |
| 3 | 29 March 2003 | Mikheil Meskhi Stadium, Tbilisi, Georgia | Republic of Ireland | 1–1 | 1–2 | UEFA Euro 2004 qualifying |
| 4 | 4 June 2005 | Qemal Stafa Stadium, Tirana, Albania | Albania | 2–3 | 2–3 | 2006 FIFA World Cup qualification |
| 5 | 16 August 2006 | Svangaskarð, Toftir | Faroe Islands | 4–0 | 6–0 | UEFA Euro 2008 qualifying |
| 6 | 15 November 2006 | Boris Paichadze Stadium, Tbilisi, Georgia | Uruguay | 1–0 | 2–0 | Friendly |
| 7 | 15 November 2006 | Boris Paichadze Stadium, Tbilisi, Georgia | Uruguay | 2–0 | 2–0 | Friendly |
| 8 | 11 October 2008 | Boris Paichadze Stadium, Tbilisi, Georgia | Cyprus | 1–1 | 1–1 | 2010 FIFA World Cup qualification |
| 9 | 28 March 2009 | Antonis Papadopoulos Stadium, Larnaca, Cyprus | Cyprus | 1–2 | 1–2 | 2010 World Cup qualification |
| 10 | 14 October 2009 | Vasil Levski National Stadium, Sofia, Bulgaria | Bulgaria | 2–6 | 2–6 | 2010 World Cup qualification |
| 11 | 3 March 2010 | Boris Paichadze Stadium, Tbilisi, Georgia | Estonia | 1–0 | 2–1 | Friendly |
| 12 | 26 March 2011 | Boris Paichadze Stadium, Tbilisi, Georgia | Croatia | 1–0 | 1–0 | UEFA Euro 2012 qualifying |

== Honours ==
Dinamo Tbilisi

- Umaglesi Liga: 1994–95, 1995–96, 1996–97, 1997–98
- Georgian Cup: 1994–95, 1995–96, 1996–97
- Georgian Super Cup: 1996, 1997

SC Freiburg

- 2. Bundesliga: 2002–03

Schalke 04

- DFL-Ligapokal: 2005
- DFB-Pokal runners-up: 2004–05
- UEFA Intertoto Cup: 2003, 2004

== See also ==
- List of men's footballers with 100 or more international caps

| Preceded by Aleksandre Chivadze (acting) | Presidents of GFF; 2015– | Succeeded by incumbent |
