= Sarbieli =

Georgian sports newspaper

- Native name: სარბიელი
- Type: Sports newspaper
- Format: Broadsheet
- Owner: LLC Publishing Firm "Mardi"
- Publisher: Union of Managers of Georgia
- Editor: Zurab Potskhveria, Zurab Medzvelia, Giorgi Darjania
- Ceased publication: June 22, 2009 (print)
- Language: Georgian
- Website: www.sarbieli.com

Sarbieli (Georgian: სარბიელი) was the leading Georgian daily sports newspaper, published between 1990 and 2009. It is recognized as the first independent sports publication in Georgia. During the 1990s and early 2000s, it was the most successful and influential sports periodical in the country. The first issue was released on December 28, 1990, priced at 40 kopeks. The editorial mission, published on the front page of the inaugural issue, stated:

"The responsibility towards the reader and, clearly, towards Georgian sports—of which we hope to be a supporter and a beacon—is incomparably high. With full awareness of this responsibility, we offer this new newspaper to the Georgian public, hoping that 'Sarbieli' will find its place amidst the current abundance of information and periodicals."

Following a 20-month involuntary hiatus, the newspaper resumed regular publication on August 3, 1993. The paper was known for its creative staff, which included the prominent writer Aka Morchiladze (writing under the pseudonym Gio Akhvlediani). His sports essays were later compiled into a two-volume book titled In Sarbieli ("სარბიელში").

== History and Polls ==
Starting from 1993, Sarbieli established the tradition of conducting an annual poll among sports journalists to determine the Georgian Footballer of the Year. The winners of the bronze-sculpted trophy included:

- Georgi Kinkladze (1992–1993, 1995–1996)
- Akaki Devadze (1993–1994)
- Shota Arveladze (1994–1995, 1997–1998)
- Temur Ketsbaia (1996–1997)
- Zaza Janashia (1998–1999)
- Levan Kobiashvili (1999–2000)

In 1998, the newspaper conducted a major poll allowing readers to select the "Best Georgian Football Team of All Time." The newspaper also conducted polls for the Georgian Basketballer of the Year, with titles awarded to Nikolay Deryugin (1993–1994), Vakhtang Natsvlishvili (1994–1995), and Gela Darsadze (1995–1996).

In cooperation with the Georgian Sports Journalists Association, Sarbieli organized a major national referendum to identify the best Georgian athletes, teams, coaches, and sports figures of the 20th century.

== International Partnerships ==
Sarbieli maintained high-level international affiliations:

- Ballon d'Or: Since 1994, France Football consulted Sarbieli for the annual European Footballer of the Year (Ballon d'Or) voting.
- FIFA: Since 2016, the publication has been a partner of FIFA for its annual awards.
- FIBA: Selected by the International Basketball Federation as the official mediator for Georgian fans to vote for the FIBA EuroStars participants.
- World Athletics: Participated in World Athletics (IAAF) polls to determine the best male and female athletes globally.
- Judo: Collaborated with the European Judo Union for annual referendums on the best judokas in Europe.

== Other Sports and Sponsorships ==
In 1995, the paper introduced the "Sarbieli Sini" (Sarbieli Tray) in rugby, a challenge trophy for the Georgian Championship. The paper was also the general sponsor of the 4th Georgian Handball Championship (1993–1994) and an official partner of the Georgian National Olympic Committee for the 1996 Summer Olympics and 2000 Summer Olympics.

== Operations and Format ==
On March 2, 1999, the newspaper increased its price from 50 Tetri to 1 GEL and expanded its volume to 16 pages to provide more comprehensive coverage. Although the price was later reverted to 50 Tetri, the 16-page format was maintained.

By late 2000, Sarbieli correspondents had reported from 110 cities in 45 countries across four continents. The brand also produced a monthly magazine between 2000 and 2002.

== Awards and Transition to Digital ==
In 2001, Sarbieli received the "Golden Pen" award as the Best Sports Publication of the Year. After the print version ceased in 2009, the brand faced a nine-year hiatus. In 2017, the original editorial team relaunched Sarbieli as a digital sports portal.

On December 28, 2020, to mark the 30th anniversary of its founding, a special one-time commemorative print edition of Sarbieli was published to celebrate the legacy of the newspaper and Georgian sports.

== See also ==
- Georgian Footballer of the Year – An annual award established and conducted by Sarbieli since 1993.
