= Aleksandr Iashvili =

Georgian footballer

Alexandr Iashvili
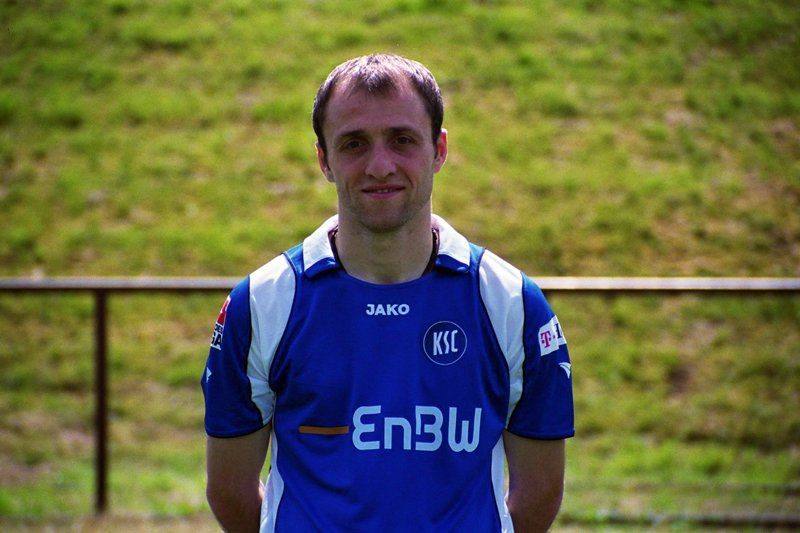
- Iashvili with Karlsruher SC in 2007

Personal information
- Date of birth: 23 October 1977 (age 49)
- Place of birth: Tbilisi, Georgian SSR, Soviet Union
- Height: 1.75 m (5 ft 9 in)
- Positions: Forward; midfielder

Senior career*
Years	Team	Apps	(Gls)
1993–1997	Dinamo Tbilisi	89	(84)
1997	→ VfB Lübeck (loan)	15	(3)
1997–2007	SC Freiburg	255	(51)
2007–2012	Karlsruher SC	141	(24)
2012–2013	VfL Bochum	28	(0)
2013–2014	Inter Baku	33	(5)
2014–2015	Samtredia	10	(2)
2015–2016	Dinamo Tbilisi	24	(5)
Total		595	(174)

International career
1993	Georgia U-17	2	(0)
1994–1995	Georgia U-19	4	(0)
1996–1997	Georgia U-21	9	(1)
1996–2011	Georgia	67	(15)
- * Club domestic league appearances and goals

Alexandr Iashvili (Georgian: ალექსანდრე მამულის ძე იაშვილი; born 23 October 1977) is a Georgian former professional footballer who played as a striker.

== Club career ==
=== Early years ===
Born in Tbilisi, Iashvili started his career in Dinamo Tbilisi in 1993, where he became a prolific goalscorer. With 24 goals in 24 games (1994–95) and 26 goals in 25 games (1995–96) he attracted interest from foreign clubs, and at the age of 19 decided to join VfB Lübeck on loan in January 1997.

=== SC Freiburg ===
After initially returning to Tbilisi from his loan spell Iashvili permanently moved to play in Germany, signing with SC Freiburg for the 1996–97 season. The team earned promotion to the Bundesliga in his first season there. For the 2005–06 season he was promoted to team captain. In April 2007, he expressed his intention to not renew his Freiburg contract but to instead leave for another, preferably German, club. In his ten years at Freiburg he scored 51 goals in 255 league appearances.

=== Karlsruher SC ===
Iashvili subsequently joined Karlsruher SC in summer 2007. In 2009, Iashvili agreed to a contract extension until 2013. In 2012, he was released by Karlsruhe.

=== Later years ===
In 2012, Iashvili joined fellow 2. Bundesliga side VfL Bochum.

Iashvili spent the 2013–2014 season with Inter Baku of the Azerbaijan Premier League.

He played for FC Samtredia in his home country in the second half of the 2014–2015 season.

In July 2015, he re-joined his home club Dinamo Tbilisi.

== International career ==
Having played 67 matches scoring 15 goals, Iashvili is the fifth most-capped player of Georgia. With Georgia he won in 1998 the Malta International Football Tournament.

== Career statistics ==
=== Club ===
Appearances and goals by club, season and competition
Club	Season	League			National Cup		Continental		Other		Total		Ref.
Club	Season	Division	Apps	Goals	Apps	Goals	Apps	Goals	Apps	Goals	Apps	Goals	Ref.
Dinamo Tbilisi	1993–94	Top League	28	19							28	19	
Dinamo Tbilisi	1994–95	Top League	24	24			1	0			25	24	
Dinamo Tbilisi	1995–96	Top League	25	26			1	0			26	26	
Dinamo Tbilisi	1996–97	Top League	8	9			8	3			16	12	
Dinamo Tbilisi	1997–98	Top League	4	6			6	3			10	9	
Dinamo Tbilisi	Total		89	84	0	0	16	6	0	0	105	90	—
VfB Lübeck (loan)	1996–97	2. Bundesliga	15	3	0	0	—		—		15	3	
SC Freiburg	1997–98	2. Bundesliga	24	4	0	0	—		—		24	4	
SC Freiburg	1998–99	Bundesliga	11	6	2	0	—		—		13	6	
SC Freiburg	1999–00	Bundesliga	22	1	1	1	—		—		23	2	
SC Freiburg	2000–01	Bundesliga	26	4	3	2	—		—		29	6	
SC Freiburg	2001–02	Bundesliga	29	5	2	2	6	0	1 (Note: Includes appearance in DFB-Ligapokal)	0	38	6	
SC Freiburg	2002–03	2. Bundesliga	25	4	0	0	—		—		25	4	
SC Freiburg	2003–04	Bundesliga	30	9	3	3	—		—		33	12	
SC Freiburg	2004–05	Bundesliga	29	4	4	2	—		—		33	6	
SC Freiburg	2005–06	2. Bundesliga	27	4	2	2	—		—		29	6	
SC Freiburg	2006–07	2. Bundesliga	32	10	2	0	—		—		34	10	
SC Freiburg	Total		255	51	19	12	6	0	1	0	281	63	—
Karlsruher SC	2007–08	Bundesliga	28	0	2	0	—		1	0	31	0	
Karlsruher SC	2008–09	Bundesliga	23	3	2	2	—		—		25	5	
Karlsruher SC	2009–10	2. Bundesliga	27	6	2	0	—		—		29	6	
Karlsruher SC	2010–11	2. Bundesliga	31	7	1	0	—		—		32	7	
Karlsruher SC	2011–12	2. Bundesliga	32	8	2	0	—		2 (Note: Includes 2. Bundesliga relegation playoff)	0	36	8	
Karlsruher SC	Total		141	24	9	2	0	0	3	0	153	26	—
VfL Bochum	2012–13	2. Bundesliga	28	0	4	1	—		—		32	1	
Inter Baku	2013-14	APL	33	5			4	0			37	5	
FC Samtredia	2014–15	Top League	10	2							10	2	
Dinamo Tbilisi	2015–16	Top League	24	5			2	0			26	5	
Career total			595	174	32	15	28	6	4	0	659	195	—

=== International ===
Appearances and goals by national team and year
National team	Year	Apps	Goals
Georgia	1996	2	1
Georgia	1997	0	0
Georgia	1998	5	1
Georgia	1999	0	0
Georgia	2000	1	0
Georgia	2001	4	4
Georgia	2002	1	0
Georgia	2003	5	1
Georgia	2004	5	1
Georgia	2005	4	1
Georgia	2006	6	1
Georgia	2007	5	2
Georgia	2008	8	0
Georgia	2009	7	1
Georgia	2010	7	1
Georgia	2011	7	1
Total		67	15

== Honours ==
Dinamo Tbilisi

- Erovnuli Liga: 1993–94, 1994–95, 1995–96, 1996–97, 1997–98
- Georgian Cup: 1993–94, 1994–95, 1995–96, 1996–97
- Georgian Super Cup: 1996, 1997

SC Freiburg

- 2. Bundesliga: 2002–03

Individual

- Georgian Footballer of the Year: 2004, 2008
