= Georgian Footballer of the Year =

National association football award

- Native name: საქართველოს წლის საუკეთესო ფეხბურთელი
- Description: Annual football award given to the best Georgian footballer
- Country: Georgia
- Presented by: Sarbieli (since 1993) / Kartuli Pekhburti (1990, 1992)

Georgian Footballer of the Year is an annual award given to the best Georgian footballer. The award for an official year is given in summer on the basis of players' performance in a winter league season. The winner is elected by results of a poll conducted among Georgian journalists. From 1993, it is awarded by sports daily newspaper Sarbieli (სარბიელი). Earlier, in 1990 and 1992, another newspaper, Kartuli Pekhburti (ქართული ფეხბურთი), awarded it.

== Winners ==
Year	Footballer	Club	Points
1990	Temur Ketsbaia	(Georgian Soviet Socialist Republic) Dinamo Tbilisi	
1992	Mikhail Jishkariani	(Georgia (country)) Tskhumi Sokhumi	
1993	Giorgi Kinkladze	(Georgia (country)) Dinamo Tbilisi	
1994	Shota Arveladze	(Turkey) Trabzonspor	
1995	Akaki Devadze	(Russia) Rostselmash	
1996	Giorgi Kinkladze	(England) Manchester City	
1997	Temur Ketsbaia	(Greece) AEK Athens	
1998	Shota Arveladze	(Netherlands) Ajax	
1999	Zaza Janashia	(Russia) Lokomotiv Moscow	
2000	Levan Kobiashvili	(Germany) Freiburg	
2001	Kakha Kaladze	(Italy) Milan	
2002	Kakha Kaladze	(Italy) Milan	
2003	Kakha Kaladze	(Italy) Milan	
2004	Aleksandr Iashvili	(Germany) Freiburg	
2005	Levan Kobiashvili	(Germany) Schalke 04	
2006	Kakha Kaladze	(Italy) Milan	
2007	Shota Arveladze	(Netherlands) AZ	
2008	Aleksandr Iashvili	(Germany) Karlsruhe	
2009	Jano Ananidze	(Russia) Spartak Moscow	
2010	Giorgi Merebashvili	(Serbia) Vojvodina	
2011	Kakha Kaladze	(Italy) Genoa	
2012	Guram Kashia	(Netherlands) Vitesse Arnhem	
2013	Guram Kashia	(Netherlands) Vitesse Arnhem	
2014	Saba Kvirkvelia	(Russia) Rubin Kazan	
2015	Jaba Kankava	(France) Reims	
2016	Tornike Okriashvili	(Russia) Krasnodar	
2017	Saba Kvirkvelia	(Russia) Lokomotiv Moscow	
2018	Giorgi Chakvetadze	(Belgium) KAA Gent	
2019	Jaba Kankava	(Kazakhstan) FC Tobol	
2020	Khvicha Kvaratskhelia	(Russia) Rubin Kazan	
2021	Khvicha Kvaratskhelia	(Russia) Rubin Kazan	
2022	Khvicha Kvaratskhelia	(Italy) Napoli	
2023	Khvicha Kvaratskhelia	(Italy) Napoli	
2024	Giorgi Mamardashvili	(Spain) Valencia	
2025	Khvicha Kvaratskhelia	(France) PSG	

== Multiple winners ==
As of July 2025

Players in bold are still active in professional football.

Multiple winners
Rank	Player	Wins
1	Kakha Kaladze	5
1	**Khvicha Kvaratskhelia**	5
3	Shota Arveladze	3
4	Temur Ketsbaia	2
4	Giorgi Kinkladze	2
4	Levan Kobiashvili	2
4	Aleksandr Iashvili	2
4	**Guram Kashia**	2
4	**Saba Kvirkvelia**	2
4	**Jaba Kankava**	2
