= 1994–95 Pirveli Liga =

1994–95 Pirveli Liga was the sixth season of the Pirveli Liga, the second division of professional football in Georgia. It consists of reserve team and professional team.

== Eastern zone ==
Pos	Team	Pld	W	D	L	GF	GA	GD	Pts	Promotion or relegation
1	Sioni Bolnisi (P)	30	23	4	3	85	25	+60	73	Promotion to Umaglesi Liga
2	Merani-91 Tbilisi	30	22	5	3	69	19	+50	71	
3	Meskheti Akhaltsikhe	30	22	5	3	72	32	+40	71	
4	Zooveti Tbilisi	30	20	5	5	79	37	+42	65	
5	Merani-Bacho Tbilisi	30	13	7	10	62	43	+19	46	
6	Shiraki Dedoplistskaro	30	12	3	15	39	49	−10	39	
7	ASK Tbilisi	30	11	5	14	41	49	−8	38	
8	Azoti Rustavi	30	10	8	12	42	43	−1	38	
9	Kiziki Tsnori	30	8	8	14	39	57	−18	32	
10	Tori Borjomi	30	9	4	17	47	70	−23	31	
11	Alazani Gurjaani	30	9	4	17	35	60	−25	31	
12	Mretebi Tbilisi	30	8	7	15	36	56	−20	31	
13	Gvardia Tbilisi	30	8	7	15	39	49	−10	31	
14	FC Chabukiani	30	8	2	20	23	63	−40	26	
15	Aragvi Dusheti (R)	30	6	8	16	34	61	−27	26	Relegation to Meore Liga
16	Avaza Tbilisi (R)	30	6	8	16	35	64	−29	26	Relegation to Meore Liga

(P) Promoted; (R) Relegated

Name changes:

- Armazi Tbilisi changed name to Gvardia Tbilisi
- Imedi Rustavi changed name to Azoti Rustavi
- Avaza Tbilisi merged with Krtsanisi Tbilisi
- Antsi Tbilisi merged with Zooveti Tbilisi

== Western zone ==
Pos	Team	Pld	W	D	L	GF	GA	GD	Pts	Promotion or relegation
1	Egrisi Senaki (P)	24	20	1	3	53	17	+36	61	Promotion to Umaglesi Liga
2	Kakhaberi-Iaguari Khelvachauri	24	18	2	4	48	26	+22	56	
3	Meshakhte Tkibuli	24	18	1	5	72	40	+32	55	
4	Bakhmaro Chokhatauri	24	12	2	10	43	32	+11	38	
5	Mertskhali Ozurgeti	24	11	3	10	34	36	−2	36	
6	Magaroeli Chiatura	24	11	3	10	43	34	+9	36	
7	Samegrelo Chkhorotsku	24	11	0	13	29	32	−3	33	
8	Universiteti-ASK Zugdidi	24	10	0	14	47	56	−9	30	
9	Skuri Tsalenjikha	24	9	2	13	38	46	−8	29	
10	Sulori Vani	24	8	3	13	32	32	0	27	
11	Imereti Khoni	24	7	3	14	26	41	−15	24	
12	Shukura Kobuleti	24	6	1	17	33	57	−24	19	
13	Sachino Vani (R)	24	4	1	19	23	72	−49	13	Relegation to Meore Liga

(P) Promoted; (R) Relegated

Name changes:

- Anako Ozurgeti changed name back to Mertskhali Ozurgeti
- Ulumbo Sapkhino changed name to Sagino Sapkhino
- Universiteti Zugdidi merged with SKA (Zugdidi ?)

== See also ==
- 1994–95 Umaglesi Liga
- 1994–95 Georgian Cup
