= Georgi Kinkladze =

Georgian footballer

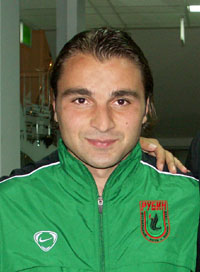
- Kinkladze in 2005

Personal information
- Date of birth: 6 July 1973 (age 53)
- Place of birth: Tbilisi, Georgian SSR, Soviet Union
- Height: 1.70 m (5 ft 7 in)
- Position: Midfielder

Youth career
- 1979–1989: Dinamo Tbilisi

Senior career*
Years	Team	Apps	(Gls)
1989–1991	Mretebi Tbilisi	80	(18)
1991–1995	Dinamo Tbilisi	65	(41)
1993	→ 1. FC Saarbrücken (loan)	11	(0)
1994	→ Boca Juniors (loan)	3	(0)
1995–1998	Manchester City	106	(20)
1998–2000	Ajax	12	(0)
1999–2000	→ Derby County (loan)	13	(1)
2000–2003	Derby County	80	(6)
2004–2005	Anorthosis	22	(2)
2005–2006	Rubin Kazan	13	(2)
Total		405	(90)

International career
1992–2005	Georgia	54	(8)
- * Club domestic league appearances and goals

Georgi Kinkladze (Georgian: გიორგი ქინქლაძე, pronounced [ɡioɾɡi kʰinkʰlad͡zɛ]; born 6 July 1973), also spelled Georgiou, or Giorgi, or shortened to Gio, is a Georgian former footballer who played as a playmaking midfielder.

Born in the Georgian capital Tbilisi, his first professional club was Mretebi Tbilisi. In Georgia he won three league titles and two cups with Dinamo Tbilisi, and was named national player of the year twice. He first came to international prominence with his performances for the Georgian national team against Wales in 1994 and 1995.

Kinkladze transferred from Dinamo Tbilisi to English Premier League club Manchester City in 1995, where his dribbling ability and spectacular goals made him a cult hero, winning the club's Player of the Year award in two consecutive seasons. Kinkladze stayed with Manchester City despite relegation to the Football League First Division in 1996, but the club continued to decline, and after a second relegation in 1998 he joined Dutch champions Ajax. With his national team, he won the Malta International Football Tournament 1998.

Kinkladze was unable to settle in the Netherlands, and returned to England with Derby County a little over a year later. He spent four years at Derby, making nearly 100 appearances. After leaving Derby in 2003, he had unsuccessful trials at several clubs before joining Cypriot club Anorthosis in 2004, where he won a league championship medal. He finished his playing career with Russian club Rubin Kazan in 2006.

== Early life ==
Georgi Kinkladze was born on 6 July 1973 in Tbilisi, Georgia, which was then part of the Soviet Union. As a child, he lived in the Didube district of the city with his father, Robinzon (an engineer), his mother Khatuna (a teacher) and his elder sister. Robinzon was keen to see his son succeed as a footballer, sometimes making him walk around the family home on his knees to strengthen his legs, and enrolled him for Dinamo Tbilisi's junior side when he was six years old. Khatuna disapproved of some of her husband's methods, instead taking Georgi to lessons in mtiuluri, a traditional Georgian ballet. Over the next few years, Kinkladze played in Dinamo Tbilisi's youth teams, progressing as far as the reserve team, where he played alongside Shota Arveladze, who would later become his teammate at both senior and international level.

== Playing career ==
=== Early career ===
When Georgian football formed leagues independent of Soviet competition in 1989, a family friend arranged for Kinkladze to move to Mretebi Tbilisi, the first openly professional club in the Soviet Union. Mretebi Tbilisi were a smaller club playing at a lower level, but the move gave Kinkladze the opportunity to play first team football instead of playing for Dinamo's second team. Kinkladze made his professional debut aged 16, and immediately became a first team regular. In 1991 Kinkladze's Mretebi won the Pirveli Liga, and won promotion to the highest division following a play-off.

After a season in the top flight with Mretebi, Kinkladze was signed by Dinamo Tbilisi, the team he represented as a youth, for one million roubles. In September 1992, shortly after signing for Dinamo, Kinkladze made his senior international debut, aged 19. The match, against Azerbaijan, was the Georgian national side's fourth since breaking from the Soviet Union in 1991. Kinkladze's youth-level teammate Shota Arveladze also played in the match, and Kinkladze provided an assist for a goal by Arveladze.

In Kinkladze's first season at the club, Dinamo won a league and cup double. However, due to the ongoing Georgian Civil War, during 1993 the Dinamo Tbilisi management sought to put their players in a more stable environment. As part of this, Kinkladze was sent on loan to 1. FC Saarbrücken in Germany. Kinkladze made his Saarbrücken debut in a 2. Bundesliga match against Tennis Borussia Berlin, a 2–2 draw on 4 March 1994. He was unable to settle into the side at Saarbrücken, rarely playing a full 90 minutes, and was sent off in a 1–3 defeat to Hertha Berlin. At the end of the season, Kinkladze returned to Tbilisi to resume his career in Georgia, where he was named the national Player of the Year for 1993. Dinamo president Merab Jordania was still uncomfortable with Kinkladze playing in Georgia amid political instability, and offered the player to Atlético Madrid for approximately £200,000; they gave him a trial, but no contract. He then trained with Real Madrid's reserves, where he caught the eye of Boca Juniors scouts, who took him to Argentina for a month's loan. Kinkladze met his childhood hero Diego Maradona, but did not gain a permanent contract, as manager Silvio Marzolini regarded him as too similar to Boca's Argentine international playmaker Alberto Márcico.

In September 1994, Kinkladze was part of the Georgian team that played Moldova in Tbilisi. Italian clubs became interested in Kinkladze after seeing footage of his performance, and the Italian press nicknamed Kinkladze the "Rivera of the Black Sea", but no concrete attempts to sign him took place. It was not until Manchester City chairman Francis Lee saw the recording that negotiations for a permanent move abroad occurred. Enthused by Kinkladze's display, Lee contacted Jordania, securing an agreement that Manchester City would have first refusal should Dinamo wish to sell the player.

Two months later, Kinkladze scored his first international goal as Georgia defeated Wales 5–0. Wales goalkeeper Neville Southall later said of the game "They murdered us... [Kinkladze] was different class and the best player on the pitch by a mile." When the teams met again at Cardiff Arms Park, scouts from several clubs saw Kinkladze score the only goal of the game with a 20-yard (18 m) chip over Southall. In his last season with Dinamo, the team once again won the double. Kinkladze had scored 14 goals in 21 appearances, and clubs from several countries expressed interest in signing him. Jordania kept true to his agreement with Lee, and on 15 July 1995, Kinkladze signed for Manchester City. The fee was generally reported as £2 million. After initial difficulties obtaining a work permit, Kinkladze made his debut for Manchester City against Tottenham Hotspur in a 1–1 draw on 19 August 1995.

=== Manchester City ===
Manchester City's form was poor during the 1995–96 season. The team failed to win a single league game in the first three months of the season, but Kinkladze quickly became a popular figure. Kinkladze's first goal for the club occurred in a 1–0 win against Aston Villa, following a one-two with Niall Quinn. Kinkladze was initially homesick, as he was living in a hotel and spoke little English. In an effort to resolve his homesickness, his mother moved to Manchester to provide him with familiar food. By the time Manchester City travelled to Middlesbrough on 9 December 1995, press and supporters regarded Kinkladze as the star player of the Manchester City side. The match against Middlesbrough was billed as a contest between Kinkladze and the Brazilian playmaker Juninho. Kinkladze scored the opening goal with a solo effort, but the match ended 4–1 to Middlesbrough. However, the Middlesbrough fans subsequently voted Kinkladze the "Best Opposing Player of the Season". On 16 March 1996, Kinkladze scored a particularly spectacular goal in a 2–1 win against Southampton. Kinkladze beat five players before chipping the ball over Southampton goalkeeper Dave Beasant. The goal won BBC programme Match of the Day's "Goal of the Month", and placed second in the programme's "Goal of the Season" competition.

On the final day of the season, Manchester City were relegated to the First Division, prompting transfer speculation linking Kinkladze to a number of clubs including Barcelona, Internazionale, Liverpool, and Celtic. However, he opted to stay at Manchester City, where he had been named Player of the Year for 1995–96. The 1996–97 season proved a turbulent one for Manchester City, and over the course of the season, Kinkladze played for five different managers. With Keith Curle no longer at the club, Kinkladze became the main penalty taker, and also scored a number of goals from free-kicks, including a 35-yard (32 m) effort against Swindon Town described by English newspaper Manchester Evening News as "like a missile". In the First Division, Kinkladze frequently had two or even three opposing players assigned to man mark him. Several teams chose to combat Kinkladze's playmaking skill with robust tackles; in one such match on 11 January 1997, against Crystal Palace, Kinkladze had to be stretchered off following a challenge by David Hopkin. Manchester City finished the season well below the promotion places, and again, there was speculation that Kinkladze would leave the club. At the final match of the season on 3 May 1997, a 3–2 win against Reading, Manchester City supporters campaigned to keep Kinkladze at the club, even though he was not playing in the match, due to injury. The campaign even extended to the half-time advertisements on the scoreboard, the "adverts" being messages from supporter groups who had paid to display them. Kinkladze was named Player of the Year for the second consecutive season, and one month after the season ended, he announced his intention to stay at the club by signing a new three-year contract. Kinkladze used the proceeds from his new contract to buy a Ferrari, though the car caused consternation among club officials. Their fears were realised on 29 October 1997, when Kinkladze lost control of his vehicle and crashed into a motorway bridge in Hale. Kinkladze received back injuries requiring 30 stitches, and missed two matches as a result.

Manchester City's downward trajectory toward the Second Division continued in the 1997–98 season, and on 17 February 1998, manager Frank Clark was sacked. His replacement, Joe Royle, was appointed City manager on 18 February 1998. He had a reputation for playing defensive midfielders, which led to his Everton team being nicknamed the "Dogs of War". Royle viewed Kinkladze as an unaffordable luxury in a relegation battle, and in his first board meeting as Manchester City manager, he opened proceedings with the words "We have to sell Kinkladze". After playing the first two games under Royle, a 1–2 loss on 18 February against Ipswich Town, and a 3–1 win against Swindon Town on 23 February, Kinkladze sustained an ankle injury, which sidelined him for a month. He made his return at Port Vale on 14 March, despite having taken little part in training in the preceding week. Port Vale were a team with a physically robust approach, and used the muddy conditions to their advantage. Kinkladze was played out of position on the right wing, much to his displeasure, and gave a performance that the Manchester Evening News summarised as "barely noticeable". Vale defeated City 2–1, and Royle severely criticised Kinkladze for a lack of effort, dropping him for the next six games. In 2005, Royle explained his view of Kinkladze in his autobiography: "To the supporters he was the only positive in all that time. To me, he was a big negative. I am not saying that City's ills were all down to Kinkladze, but there was too much about the whole Kinkladze cult phenomenon that wasn't right ...too often since his arrival, the team had under-performed. I couldn't help deducing that contrary to popular opinion, he would be my weak link not my strong one." With two games remaining, Manchester City were in the relegation places, and Kinkladze was restored to the starting lineup for the home match against Queens Park Rangers (QPR). The QPR team contained Vinnie Jones, who had a violent reputation and played using the axiom "if their top geezer gets sorted out early doors, you win". Jones tried to apply his philosophy to Kinkladze, even targeting him in the tunnel before the start of the match. Kinkladze opened the scoring with a free kick, but City could not maintain their lead. Defending described by The Observer's reporter as a "calamity" culminated in an unusual own goal from Jamie Pollock, and meant the match ended in a 2–2 draw. City were relegated for the second time in three seasons despite a final day 5–2 win against Stoke City. In total, Kinkladze made 119 appearances for Manchester City, scoring 22 goals. He played regular international football during this period of his career, including in a 0–0 draw with three-time World Cup winners Italy.

=== Ajax ===
Following transfer negotiations which had been ongoing in the final months of the season, Kinkladze left Manchester City for Dutch club Ajax for £5 million. The move brought a reunion with Shota Arveladze, with whom he shared a house in Amsterdam. However, Kinkladze's spell at Ajax proved unsuccessful. He was originally signed as a replacement for Jari Litmanen, but Litmanen stayed at Ajax as his proposed move to Barcelona fell through. As a result, Kinkladze played in an unfamiliar left-wing position. His league debut for Ajax came in a 2–0 win against Willem II on 23 August 1998, but he made few starts. To compound matters, manager Morten Olsen was sacked early in the season, and a disagreement with replacement Jan Wouters resulted in Kinkladze losing his place in the team. "I could have been Maradona and he wouldn't have changed the system to accommodate me", Kinkladze recalled later. "I wasn't playing football and that made my life hell." He immediately started to look elsewhere. Several English top-flight clubs showed interest in signing him, but were discouraged by work permit issues. His lack of regular playing time also resulted in him losing his place in the Georgian national team. Having failed to established himself in the first team and struggling with a succession of injuries, he made just 12 appearances for Ajax in his first season.

Kinkladze was not issued a squad number for his second season, and was made to train with the reserve team. In September 1999, Kinkladze held transfer talks with Sheffield United, but no move materialised. Two months later, a return to England was secured in the form of a loan move to Derby County.

=== Derby County ===
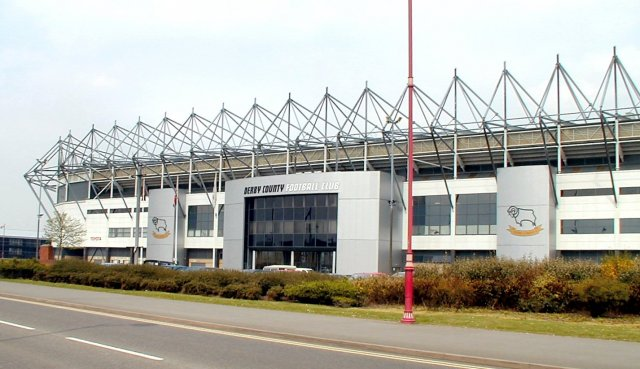
Pride Park, where Kinkladze played for Derby County between 2000 and 2003.

As Kinkladze was not playing regular international football when he signed for Derby, he was not automatically entitled to a work permit, but a review panel gave him special dispensation, due to his previous contribution to English football. He made his debut on 28 November 1999, coming on as a substitute for Avi Nimni in a 1–2 loss against Arsenal, the first of 14 loan appearances. He scored his first Derby goal on 4 March 2000 in a 4–0 win against Wimbledon. At the end of the season, the loan move was made permanent. The transfer fee of £3 million set a club record that stood until 2007.

Kinkladze missed the start of the 2000–01 season due to a hernia operation, to the disappointment of Smith, who expected him to become a leading figure at the club. He returned to the side as a substitute against Middlesbrough on 6 September 2000. With Derby 3–0 down, Kinkladze and Malcolm Christie were introduced in a double substitution. The pair then proved influential as Derby came back to draw the match 3–3. During the next four months, Kinkladze was sometimes a starter and sometimes a substitute, rotating with Stefano Eranio, until a groin injury sustained in the return match with Middlesbrough kept Kinkladze out for two months. Over the season, Kinkladze "showed little of the brilliance he was bought in to deliver" and was named Derby's biggest disappointment of the season by The Guardian. The match against Leeds United on 23 September 2000 was a rare success for him. He came on as a substitute with 17 minutes remaining and levelled the game 1–1 with a solo goal two minutes later, jinking between two defenders before curling a left-foot shot beyond the goalkeeper. Derby struggled for most of the season, but avoided relegation. Kinkladze stayed at the club, since his injuries and inability to prove himself led to a lack of serious offers. Around this time, he married Louise Tai, a Mancunian. Louise then became a member of the Orthodox Church and was christened in Tbilisi, receiving a new name – Mariam. Their first child, Saba, was born in October 2001.

For Kinkladze, the start of the 2001–02 season followed a similar pattern to the previous season, comprising a mixture of starts and substitute appearances. Jim Smith resigned from his managerial position at Derby on 7 October 2001, leaving Kinkladze, a Smith favourite, bitterly disappointed. The appointment of new manager Colin Todd signalled a change in the club's playing style. Todd did not favour flair players, and Kinkladze made only a single substitute appearance in Todd's first two months in charge. Frustrated by a lack of opportunities, Kinkladze took the unusual step of using his lawyer to arrange a meeting with Todd to discuss his exclusion from the first team. Todd reacted by telling Kinkladze he could leave the club if he was unhappy. According to Kinkladze's agent, Manchester City, as well as Spanish clubs Valencia, Mallorca and Málaga, were all interested in signing Kinkladze. However, Todd was sacked on 14 January 2002 with Derby second from bottom of the Premier League, and John Gregory was appointed as manager on 30 January 2002. Kinkladze stayed at the club, playing regular first team football in the remainder of the season, but Derby continued to struggle, and Kinkladze endured relegation for the third time in his career. The club, who were £35 million in debt, started an end-of-season clear-out to reduce their annual £17 million wage bill. Derby's actions included off-loading of some of the highest earners, and the manager informed Kinkladze that he had no future at the club. However, Kinkladze, whose contract ended in summer 2003, was reluctant to leave the club and turned down a move to Turkish champions Galatasaray.

As the club continued its attempts to terminate Kinkladze's contract, he trained with the reserve team up to 29 September 2002, missing Derby's first five matches of the 2002–03 season. He was brought back to the first team following two defeats, introduced as a substitute after an hour's stalemate against Stoke City on 31 August. His introduction proved crucial in turning the game into a 2–0 win for Derby, as he took part in the build-up of both goals. He then missed a number of matches through injuries, featuring in around half of Derby's games in the remainder of 2002. In October 2002, Georgian national team manager Aleksandr Chivadze unexpectedly omitted Kinkladze and captain Georgi Nemsadze from the team for their match against Russia, causing a stir in Georgia. Kinkladze, surprised and disappointed, said: "When I was out of form, he constantly phoned me, asked me about my play and called me to the team. Now I'm fit, scoring goals, but he didn't call me and even didn't phone." Both Kinkladze and Nemsadze returned to the starting line-up for the next European Championship qualifying match on against Ireland. By January, because of the financial crisis at Derby, Kinkladze had not been paid for more than three months. He intended to quit, but although his agent admitted interest from German side Hamburg and a second enquiry from Galatasaray, no move transpired and he remained at the club. He played for Derby more often in the second half of the season, and his form resulted in him being named the supporters Player of the Year. Derby finished the season in the bottom half of the table, and needed to reduce costs for the next season as their Premier League parachute payments had ended. As a result, Derby offered Kinkladze a one-year contract, but on a wage one third of that of his previous contract. Kinkladze decided to turn down this contract extension proposal, desiring a move to a more successful club with a chance of winning trophies. To this end, he held talks with Liverpool in May 2003. As contract negotiations with Derby did not reach a positive conclusion, Kinkladze left the club.

Without a club during pre-season, Kinkladze trained with Portsmouth, where his former manager Jim Smith was on the managing staff. He played for Portsmouth in one pre-season friendly, but Portsmouth decided instead to sign another former Manchester City playmaker, Eyal Berkovic. Over the next few months, he was linked with moves to Scottish clubs Dundee and Celtic but none resulted in a contract offer.

He also joined Leeds United on trial, playing for the reserve team to earn a permanent contract, however after he reportedly turned up late to training sessions, then manager Eddie Gray ended Kinkladze's trial spell.

As a consequence, he had to train individually and lost his place in the national team again, this time before the return match against Russia. In December 2003, Kinkladze went for a one-week trial at Panathinaikos, following an invitation from Giannis Vardinogiannis, the owner of the Greek club. However, at the end of the trial, the club decided not to sign him. Six months later, he was linked with a move to Russian club Shinnik Yaroslavl, but again, he was not offered a contract.

In 2004, he had a trial with then English Premier League side Bolton Wanderers, playing in a couple of reserve team fixtures for them. However, the Bolton manager Sam Allardyce decided against the move stating that he could not accommodate Kinkladze in the same team as Jay-Jay Okocha.

=== Anorthosis ===
Kinkladze's year and a half spell without a club came to an end in October 2004. Kinkladze's former international teammate Temuri Ketsbaia was player-manager at financially troubled Cypriot team Anorthosis. Ketsbaia gave his old friend a chance to rebuild his career, offering him a contract to play for Anorthosis. He made his debut against title contenders APOEL on 21 November and marked it with a fine goal. He scored once more in a 5–0 home victory against Olympiakos Nicosia, and in February he was recalled to Georgia's squad for the friendly against Lithuania. His contract was initially only for one season, but the club extended it for another year. Anorthosis ended the season successfully by winning the Cypriot championship and earned a place in the qualifying rounds of 2005–06 UEFA Champions League, where, thanks to the club's good run, Kinkladze played five times. He started both legs of a 2–1 first round aggregate win against Dinamo Minsk, was twice a substitute in a 3–2 second round aggregate win against Süper Lig runners-up Trabzonspor, and played the full 90 minutes in a 1–2 third round home defeat against Rangers. His display against Rangers caught the attention of Rubin Kazan’s manager Gurban Berdiýew, who invited him to join the Russian club. On 22 August 2005, Kinkladze played his last game for Anorthosis against Omonia in the Cypriot Super Cup and two days later, on the day of the second leg of the tie against Rangers, he left to close a deal with Rubin. Ketsbaia said regarding the departure: "I don't want players who have no wish to play for Anorthosis. As far as I'm concerned the Kinkladze chapter is now closed."

=== Rubin Kazan ===
Anorthosis and Rubin reached an agreement on 26 August. Kinkladze signed a contract until the end of the season, becoming the most decorated Georgian footballer to play in the Russian Premier League. He made his debut for Rubin the next day, playing the full 90 minutes in a 1–2 defeat against FC Rostov. On a personal level the debut was a successful one; his corner kick was headed into the net by Vitalijs Astafjevs for Rubin's goal. He had less remarkable performances in the next two games and was substituted both times. This did not affect Berdyev's faith in him, and at a post-match press conference he defended Kinkladze: "He needs time. He is an experienced player who, I think, will help the team." The next game for Rubin was a 5–1 away win against low-ranked Terek Grozny, and Kinkladze made a considerable contribution to it, scoring two goals and making two assists. Against Tom Tomsk, he was less successful. Kinkladze missed a late penalty, denying Rubin a vital victory. After the match Berdyev claimed he made a mistake in his choice of penalty taker.

Despite his misgivings Berdyev kept Kinkladze in the team, where he was used as one of three offensive midfielders in a 4–2–3–1 formation. Kinkladze, with his technical style and inclination for improvisation, brought more variety to the attacking play of the team, in contrast to the restrained style of play that Berdyev favoured. He provided an assist in four consecutive matches. The most important of these was against Zenit St. Petersburg, in a match that decided a place in the following year's UEFA Cup. Subsequently, he received a recall to the Georgian national squad for friendlies against Bulgaria and Jordan. However, a muscle strain meant he missed both national team games and Rubin's final league match. He ended the 2005 season with seven assists and two goals in nine appearances for Rubin.

Rubin delayed in offering Kinkladze a contract extension, leading Anorthosis to make an attempt to re-sign him early in the pre-season, but Kinkladze rejected the offer as he wished to stay at Rubin. By late December, Rubin expressed a desire to retain him but contract talks were delayed due to family reasons, and it took until mid-January for a new one-year contract to be agreed.

During his successful 2005 season, 32-year-old Kinkladze said he hoped to play on well into his thirties. The 2006 season, however, was his last. He sustained an injury in Rubin's first competitive match, a 1–0 cup match defeat against Shinnik which proved to be the last time he played a full match. A recurrence of an old injury meant he was sidelined for longer than expected, only making his return to full training in late May. Kinkladze continued to struggle to maintain fitness, making five further appearances for Rubin, two of which were starts. A match against Rostov on 20 August 2006 was the last of Kinkladze's playing career. In September, he was called to the Georgia national team but did not play or appear on the substitutes' bench. A short time later he had to undergo another course of medical treatment. He also passed a thorough medical examination, the results of which were reported as the deciding factor for his future at the club. In October, he was an unused substitute just once; he and his compatriots were the subject of criticism from Rubin's general director who announced to the press "there are questions about the Georgians in the team regarding their training and attitude to football". In November, Kinkladze again suffered an injury and missed the remainder of the season.

After a disappointing year for Kinkladze, Rubin decided not to renew his contract. In January 2007, he held talks with his previous club, Anorthosis, but the transfer never materialised. In an interview in August 2007 Kinkladze's former international teammate Malkhaz Asatiani confirmed that Kinkladze had finished his career and settled in Moscow. Kinkladze later worked as a sports agent, and in August 2011 returned to his former club Anorthosis, where he was employed as sports director until an amicable departure in June 2012.

Kinkladze participated in Rangers Weekend of Legends II on 26 March 2023

=== International career ===
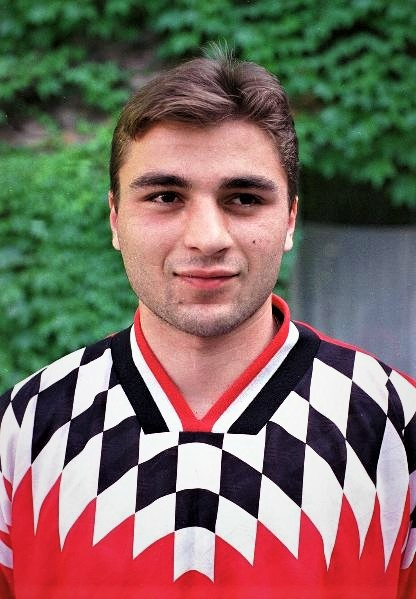
Kinkladze for Georgia 1994

In September 1994, Kinkladze was called up to the Georgian national team for a match against Moldova in Tbilisi.

Just two months later, Kinkladze played two unforgettable matches against Wales. He scored his first international goal in a 5–0 victory at the Boris Paichadze National Stadium in Tbilisi. In the return match at Cardiff Arms Park, several club scouts witnessed Kinkladze score from 18 meters past Neville Southall.

On October 11, 1995, during a UEFA Euro 1996 qualifier at the Boris Paichadze National Stadium, Kinkladze scored from the penalty spot in a 2–0 win over Bulgaria.

On June 7, 1997, in a 1998 World Cup qualifier held at the Batumi Central Stadium, Kinkladze scored the second goal in a 2–0 win against Moldova.

Kinkladze scored his third international goal on October 7, 2000, in a 2002 World Cup qualifier against Lithuania. The match was played in Kaunas at the S. Darius and S. Girėnas Stadium, and Georgia won 4–0.

== Style of play ==
Kinkladze's position was as a playmaking midfielder, typically playing further forward than the rest of the midfield. The main aim of the role is to create goalscoring chances, suiting a creative player like Kinkladze. Dribbling ability was generally viewed as one of Kinkladze's strongest attributes, and his jinking runs with the ball resulted in some spectacular goals, most notably his "Goal of the Month" against Southampton. Set piece ability was another of Kinkladze's strengths; he regularly took corners and free kicks. He also took penalties; seven of his Manchester City goals were scored from the spot, though he stopped taking penalties for the club following two consecutive misses in the 1997–98 season. Two of his nine goals for Georgia were also penalties.

Weaker points of Kinkladze's game were those related to defending. He was not noted for tackling, which sometimes caused frustration for his managers; Colin Todd remarked wistfully in 2001 that "Georgi has to understand that there is an art to tackling". Unwillingness to tackle and accusations of a lack of effort were also the source of Joe Royle's omission of Kinkladze from his Manchester City side.

On occasions, Kinkladze played as a second striker, a role with less positional responsibility. Periods when Kinkladze was used in this way included Frank Clark's first months as Manchester City manager, and alongside Fabrizio Ravanelli at Derby County. Though a left-footed player, he did not perform well when played as a left winger, and publicly expressed his distaste for playing in the position.

Over the course of his career he was Georgian Player of the Year twice, won the Club Player of the Year three times at English clubs, and has been described by a Russian football history as the brightest Georgian talent of the 1990s. In 2005, he placed third in a BBC poll to find Manchester City's all-time "cult hero".

== Career statistics ==
=== Club ===
Appearances and goals by club, season and competition
Club	Season	League			National cup		League cup		Continental		Other		Total	
Club	Season	Division	Apps	Goals	Apps	Goals	Apps	Goals	Apps	Goals	Apps	Goals	Apps	Goals
Mretebi Tbilisi	1990	Pirveli Liga	34	8			–		–				34	8
Mretebi Tbilisi	1991	Pirveli Liga	16	1			–		–				16	1
Mretebi Tbilisi	1991–92	Umaglesi Liga	30	9			–		–				30	9
Mretebi Tbilisi	Total		80	18	0	0	0	0	0	0	0	0	80	18
Dinamo Tbilisi	1992–93	Umaglesi Liga	30	14			–		4 (Note: Appearances in Commonwealth of Independent States Cup)	1			34	15
Dinamo Tbilisi	1993–94	Umaglesi Liga	14	13			–		2 (Note: Appearances in Uefa Champions League)	0			16	13
Dinamo Tbilisi	Total		44	27	0	0	0	0	6	1	0	0	50	28
1. FC Saarbrücken	1993–94	2. Bundesliga	11	0	0	0	–		–		–		11	0
Boca Juniors	1994	Argentine Primera División	3	0			–						3	0
Dinamo Tbilisi	1994–95	Umaglesi Liga	21	14			–		9 (Note: Four appearances, two goals in UEFA Cup; five appearances, three goals in Commonwealth of Independent States Cup)	5			30	19
Manchester City	1995–96	Premier League	37	4	4	1	3	0	–		–		44	5
Manchester City	1996–97	Football League First Division	39	12	3	0	1	0	–		–		43	12
Manchester City	1997–98	Football League First Division	30	4	2	1	2	0	–		–		34	5
Manchester City	Total		106	20	9	2	6	0	0	0	0	0	121	22
Ajax	1998–99	Eredivisie	12	0			–		2	0	1 (Note: Appearance in Johan Cruyff Shield)	0	15	0
Ajax	1999–2000	Eredivisie	0	0			–						0	0
Ajax	Total		12	0	0	0	0	0	2	0	1	0	15	0
Derby County	1999–2000	Premier League	17	1	1	0	0	0	–		–		18	1
Derby County	2000–01	Premier League	24	1	1	0	2	0	–		–		27	1
Derby County	2001–02	Premier League	24	1	0	0	1	1	–		–		25	2
Derby County	2002–03	Football League First Division	28	4	1	0	1	0	–		–		30	4
Derby County	Total		93	7	3	0	4	1	0	0	0	0	100	8
Anorthosis Famagusta	2004–05	Cypriot First Division	22	2			–		0	0			22	2
Anorthosis Famagusta	2005–06	Cypriot First Division	0	0			–		5	0			5	0
Anorthosis Famagusta	Total		22	2	0	0	0	0	5	0	0	0	27	2
Rubin Kazan	2005	Russian Premier League	9	2			–		0	0			9	2
Rubin Kazan	2006	Russian Premier League	4	0			–		1 (Note: Appearance in UEFA Europa League)	0			5	0
Rubin Kazan	Total		13	2	0	0	0	0	1	0	0	0	14	2
Career total			405	90	12	2	10	1	23	6	1	0	451	99

=== International ===
Appearances and goals by national team and year
National team	Year	Apps	Goals	Ref.
Georgia	1992	1	0	
Georgia	1993	0	0	
Georgia	1994	10	1	
Georgia	1995	5	2	
Georgia	1996	6	1	
Georgia	1997	6	2	
Georgia	1998	8	1	
Georgia	1999	1	0	
Georgia	2000	5	2	
Georgia	2001	6	0	
Georgia	2002	3	0	
Georgia	2003	2	0	
Georgia	2004	3	0	
Georgia	2005	1	0	
Total		57	9	–

Scores and results list Georgia's goal tally first, score column indicates score after each Kinkladze goal.

List of international goals scored by Georgi Kinkladze
No.	Date	Venue	Opponent	Score	Result	Competition	Ref.
1	16 November 1994	Boris Paichadze Stadium, Tbilisi, Georgia	Wales	2–0	5–0	UEFA Euro 1996 qualifying	
2	7 June 1995	Cardiff Arms Park, Cardiff, Wales	Wales	1–0	1–0	UEFA Euro 1996 qualifying	
3	11 October 1995	Boris Paichadze Stadium, Tbilisi, Georgia	Bulgaria	2–0	2–1	UEFA Euro 1996 qualifying	
4	29 March 1997	Boris Paichadze Stadium, Tbilisi, Georgia	Armenia	2–0	7–0	Friendly	
5	7 June 1997	Tsentral Stadium, Batumi, Georgia	Moldova	2–0	2–0	1998 FIFA World Cup qualification	
6	2 May 1998	Stade Olympique de Sousse, Sousse, Tunisia	Tunisia	1–0	1–1	Friendly	
7	29 March 2000	Sala Stadium, Ashkelon, Israel	Israel	1–0	1–1	Friendly	
8	7 October 2000	S. Darius and S. Girėnas Stadium, Kaunas, Lithuania	Lithuania	3–0	4–0	2002 FIFA World Cup qualification	

== Honours ==
=== Dinamo Tbilisi ===
- Umaglesi Liga: 1993, 1994, 1995
- Georgian Cup: 1993, 1995

=== Individual ===
- Georgian Footballer of the Year: 1993, 1996
- Manchester City Player of the Season: 1996, 1997
- Derby County Player of the Year: 2003
- PFA First Division Team of the Year: 1997, 1998
- BBC Goal of the Month: March 1996, January 1998
