= Giorgi Merebashvili =

Georgian footballer

Personal information
- Full name: Giorgi Merebashvili
- Date of birth: 15 August 1986 (age 40)
- Place of birth: Tbilisi, Georgian SSR, Soviet Union
- Height: 1.75 m (5 ft 9 in)
- Positions: Attacking midfielder; winger

Team information
- Current team: Spójnia Landek
- Number: 17

Youth career
- 2003–2005: Dinamo Tbilisi

Senior career*
Years	Team	Apps	(Gls)
2005–2010	Dinamo Tbilisi	108	(36)
2010–2012	Vojvodina	53	(11)
2012–2014	Dinamo Tbilisi	75	(20)
2014–2015	OFI	17	(4)
2015	Veria	9	(1)
2016	Levadiakos	12	(0)
2016–2021	Wisła Płock	131	(21)
2021–2022	Podbeskidzie	33	(5)
2022	Sandecja Nowy Sącz	9	(0)
2023–2024	Podbeskidzie II	41	(30)
2023–2024	Podbeskidzie	2	(0)
2024–	Spójnia Landek	60	(18)

International career
2006–2008	Georgia U21	8	(1)
2008–2019	Georgia	32	(2)
- * Club domestic league appearances and goals as of 09:30, 15 June 2026 (UTC)

Giorgi Merebashvili (Georgian: გიორგი მერებაშვილი, romanized: giorgi merebashvili, pronounced [ɡioɾɡi meɾebaʃʷili]; born 15 August 1986) is a Georgian professional footballer who plays as a midfielder for Polish club Spójnia Landek.

== Club career ==
Born in Tbilisi, Merebashvili began his professional career in 2005 with Dinamo Tbilisi. He played there for five seasons, making 108 league appearances and scored 36 goals. During the 2008–09 season he was, along with team-mate Ilija Spasojević, the club's top scorer in that season, with 13 goals, quite an achievement for a midfielder.

In January 2010, he moved to Serbian club Vojvodina where he joined his compatriot Mikheil Khutsishvili. He immediately entered into the first team finishing the half season with 15 appearances, with Vojvodina finishing fifth in the league. In the Cup they reached the 2009–10 Serbian Cup final against Red Star Belgrade.

During the 2010–11 Serbian SuperLiga Merebashvili became the anchor of the team. He ended the season with 25 appearances and his scoring skills came out again, as he scored 7 goals in the league during the season. Vojvodina finished the season in 3rd place, and they lost the 2010–11 Serbian Cup final in a polemical match against Partizan in which his team left the pitch in the 80th minute because of dubious referee decisions.

Merebashvili made an oral agreement with Veria on 25 June 2015. On 8 July 2015 was judged as innocent for the fixed match case against Olympiacos and Merebashvili's contract was activated. Merebashvili debuted on 23 August 2015 against PAS Giannina as he came on from the bench as a substitute at minute sixty. Merebashvili's effort in an away 0–1 win against AEL Kalloni, at minute 90+2' earned Veria a penalty that Djamel Abdoun converted to goal, giving Veria the victory.

== International career ==
Merebashvili earned his first cap with the Georgian national team against Portugal in Viseu on 31 May 2008. Since then, Merebashvili became a usual presence in the team by counting 15 appearances by end of 2010.

== Career statistics ==
=== International ===
Appearances and goals by national team and year
National team	Year	Apps	Goals
Georgia
Georgia	2008	3	0
Georgia	2009	7	0
Georgia	2010	6	0
Georgia	2011	1	0
Georgia	2015	1	0
Georgia	2017	8	1
Georgia	2018	5	1
Georgia	2019	1	0
Total		32	2

Scores and results list Georgia's goal tally first, score column indicates score after each Merebashvili goal.

List of international goals scored by Giorgi Merebashvili
No	Date	Venue	Opponent	Cap	Score	Result	Competition
1	11 June 2017	Zimbru Stadium, Chișinău, Moldova	Moldova	20	1–2	2–2	2018 FIFA World Cup qualification
2	19 November 2018	Boris Paichadze Dinamo Arena, Tbilisi, Georgia	Kazakhstan	31	1–0	2–1	2018–19 UEFA Nations League D

== Honours ==
Dinamo Tbilisi

- Umaglesi Liga: 2007–08, 2012–13, 2013–14
- Georgian Cup: 2008–09, 2012–13, 2013–14
- Georgian Super Cup: 2005, 2008

Podbeskidzie II

- IV liga Silesia II: 2023–24
- Polish Cup (Silesia regionals): 2023–24
- Polish Cup (Bielsko-Biała regionals): 2023–24

Individual

- Georgian Footballer of the Year: 2010
