= 1994–95 Umaglesi Liga =

Umaglesi Liga
- Season: 1994–95
- Dates: 14 August 1994 – 31 May 1995
- Champions: Dinamo Tbilisi; 6th Georgian title
- Relegated: Sapovnela Terjola; Samgurali Tskaltubo
- UEFA Cup: Dinamo Tbilisi; Samtredia
- Cup Winners' Cup: Dinamo Batumi
- Matches played: 240
- Goals scored: 807 (3.36 per match)
- Top goalscorer: Giorgi Daraselia (26)
- Biggest home win: Dinamo Tbilisi 10–1 Duruji; Dinamo Tbilisi 10–1 Margveti
- Biggest away win: Samgurali 0–7 Dinamo Tbilisi
- Highest scoring: Dinamo Tbilisi 10–1 Duruji; Dinamo Tbilisi 10–1 Margveti

The 1994–95 Umaglesi Liga was the sixth season of top-tier football in Georgia. It began on 14 August 1994 and ended on 31 May 1995. Dinamo Tbilisi were the defending champions.

== Locations ==
Location of teams in 1994–95 Umaglesi Liga

== League standings ==
| Pos | Team | Pld | W | D | L | GF | GA | GD | Pts | Qualification or relegation |
|---|---|---|---|---|---|---|---|---|---|---|
| 1 | Dinamo Tbilisi (C) | 30 | 25 | 3 | 2 | 125 | 33 | +92 | 78 | Qualification for the UEFA Cup preliminary round |
| 2 | Samtredia | 30 | 24 | 2 | 4 | 75 | 25 | +50 | 74 | Qualification for the UEFA Cup preliminary round |
| 3 | Kolkheti-1913 Poti | 30 | 20 | 3 | 7 | 72 | 28 | +44 | 63 | |
| 4 | Dinamo Batumi | 30 | 16 | 6 | 8 | 69 | 40 | +29 | 54 | Qualification for the Cup Winners' Cup qualifying round |
| 5 | Dinamo Zugdidi | 30 | 14 | 4 | 12 | 58 | 54 | +4 | 46 | |
| 6 | Torpedo Kutaisi | 30 | 14 | 2 | 14 | 58 | 47 | +11 | 44 | |
| 7 | Metalurgi Rustavi | 30 | 12 | 8 | 10 | 48 | 37 | +11 | 44 | |
| 8 | Dila Gori | 30 | 10 | 7 | 13 | 25 | 35 | −10 | 37 | |
| 9 | Margveti Zestaponi | 30 | 10 | 6 | 14 | 35 | 53 | −18 | 36 | |
| 10 | Shevardeni-1906 Tbilisi | 30 | 8 | 8 | 14 | 35 | 48 | −13 | 32 | |
| 11 | Iveria Khashuri | 30 | 9 | 4 | 17 | 31 | 58 | −27 | 31 | |
| 12 | Kakheti Telavi | 30 | 7 | 10 | 13 | 37 | 59 | −22 | 31 | |
| 13 | Guria Lanchkhuti | 30 | 8 | 6 | 16 | 36 | 81 | −45 | 30 | |
| 14 | Duruji Kvareli | 30 | 8 | 3 | 19 | 28 | 65 | −37 | 27 | |
| 15 | Sapovnela Terjola (R) | 30 | 6 | 6 | 18 | 34 | 76 | −42 | 24 | Relegation to Pirveli Liga |
| 16 | Samgurali Tskaltubo (R) | 30 | 5 | 6 | 19 | 30 | 68 | −38 | 21 | Relegation to Pirveli Liga |

Source: rsssf.org
Rules for classification: 1st points; 2nd matches won; 3rd head-to-head
(C) Champions; (R) Relegated

== Results ==
| Home \ Away | DIL | DBA | DIN | DZU | DUR | GUR | IKH | KTL | KOL | MZS | MET | SMG | SAM | SAP | SHE | TKU |
|---|---|---|---|---|---|---|---|---|---|---|---|---|---|---|---|---|
| Dila Gori | | 0–0 | 0–0 | 1–0 | 1–0 | 3–0 (Note: Match awarded.) | 1–0 | 5–0 | 2–1 | 0–2 | 0–1 | 3–0 | 0–1 | 0–0 | 0–0 | 2–1 |
| Dinamo Batumi | 2–1 | | 3–5 | 3–0 | 4–0 | 6–0 | 5–0 | 0–0 | 0–0 | 5–2 | 3–0 | 6–1 | 3–1 | 5–2 | 1–0 | 1–0 |
| Dinamo Tbilisi | 4–2 | 4–2 | | 5–0 | 10–1 | 4–0 | 3–1 | 7–1 | 4–0 | 10–1 | 3–0 | 4–0 | 1–2 | 8–2 | 5–3 | 4–2 |
| Dinamo Zugdidi | 5–0 | 3–5 | 2–2 | | 3–0 | 1–0 | 3–1 | 3–0 | 2–3 | 6–1 | 1–0 | 2–1 | 0–3 | 3–0 | 2–2 | 4–3 |
| Duruji Kvareli | 3–0 | 1–0 | 0–3 | 2–1 | | 3–1 | 2–1 | 2–2 | 0–1 | 2–4 | 0–2 | 2–1 | 0–1 | 2–1 | 3–1 | 0–3 |
| Guria Lanchkhuti | 0–0 | 0–0 | 0–6 | 2–2 | 3–2 | | 3–1 | 0–1 | 0–2 | 3–2 | 4–4 | 4–2 | 0–3 | 2–1 | 3–2 | 4–3 |
| Iveria Khashuri | 0–1 | 1–2 | 0–2 | 1–2 | 5–0 | 5–0 | | 3–1 | 2–3 | 0–0 | 2–0 | 2–1 | 0–3 | 2–0 | 3–0 | 3–2 |
| Kakheti Telavi | 0–0 | 1–0 | 3–4 | 4–3 | 0–0 | 1–1 | 0–0 | | 1–1 | 0–2 | 0–0 | 5–1 | 2–5 | 5–1 | 0–1 | 0–2 |
| Kolkheti-1913 Poti | 2–0 | 2–3 | 2–3 | 4–0 | 3–0 | 3–0 | 8–1 | 4–0 | | 4–0 | 4–0 | – (Note: Both teams were awarded a 0–3 loss.) | 3–0 | 3–0 | 4–1 | 3–0 |
| Margveti Zestaponi | 1–0 | 3–1 | 0–1 | 1–0 | 1–0 | 7–0 | 0–1 | 0–1 | 0–2 | | 0–4 | 0–0 | 0–2 | 1–1 | 0–0 | 3–2 |
| Metalurgi Rustavi | 0–0 | 3–0 | 1–4 | 3–1 | 1–0 | 1–0 | 4–1 | 2–2 | 6–1 | 1–1 | | 3–0 | 0–0 | 6–1 | 0–0 | 3–2 |
| Samgurali Tskaltubo | 1–0 | 1–1 | 0–7 | 1–1 | 2–0 | 6–1 | 2–2 | 2–4 | 0–3 | 0–1 | 2–1 | | 1–1 | 2–2 | 0–3 | 2–1 |
| Samtredia | 4–2 | 4–2 | 1–0 | 3–4 | 6–2 | 4–0 | 3–0 | 3–0 | 2–1 | 2–0 | 1–0 | 5–0 | | 5–0 | 2–0 | 3–1 |
| Sapovnela Terjola | 3–0 | 0–3 | 2–5 | 0–1 | 0–0 | 1–4 | 2–2 | 2–1 | 1–4 | 2–1 | 1–1 | 1–0 | 1–3 | | 3–2 | 3–2 |
| Shevardeni-1906 Tbilisi | 0–1 | 1–1 | 1–6 | 0–1 | 2–0 | 1–1 | 4–2 | 2–2 | 0–1 | 1–1 | 1–0 | 1–0 | 0–1 | 3–1 | | 3–2 |
| Torpedo Kutaisi | 4–0 | 4–2 | 1–1 | 3–2 | 2–1 | 4–0 | 1–0 | 3–0 | 0–0 | 2–0 | 2–1 | 2–1 | 2–1 | – | 2–0 | |

Source: rsssf.org
Legend: Blue = home team win; Yellow = draw; Red = away team win.

== Top goalscorers ==
| Rank | Goalscorer | Team | Goals |
|---|---|---|---|
| 1 | (Georgia (country)) Giorgi Daraselia | Kolkheti-1913 Poti | 26 |
| 2 | (Georgia (country)) Mamuka Khundadze | Torpedo Kutaisi | 25 |
| 3 | (Georgia (country)) Aleksandre Iashvili | Dinamo Tbilisi | 24 |
| 4 | (Georgia (country)) Paata Machutadze | Dinamo Batumi | 19 |
| 5 | (Georgia (country)) Gia Jishkariani | Samtredia | 18 |
| 6 | (Georgia (country)) Zviad Endeladze | Margveti Zestaponi | 17 |
| 7 | (Georgia (country)) Gocha Jamarauli | Dinamo Tbilisi | 16 |
| 8 | (Georgia (country)) Varlam Kilasonia | Metalurgi Rustavi | 15 |
| 8 | (Georgia (country)) Zaza Janashia | Samtredia | 15 |
| 10 | (Georgia (country)) Georgi Kinkladze | Dinamo Tbilisi | 14 |
| 10 | (Georgia (country)) Mikheil Kavelashvili | Dinamo Tbilisi | 14 |
| 10 | (Georgia (country)) Badri Daraselia | Dinamo Zugdidi | 14 |

== See also ==
- 1994–95 Pirveli Liga
- 1994–95 Georgian Cup
