= 1996–97 Pirveli Liga =

1996–97 Pirveli Liga was the eighth season of the Pirveli Liga, the second division of professional football in Georgia. The 1996–97 season was divided in two groups, with a total of 37 teams participating.

== West Group ==
Pos	Team	Pld	W	D	L	GF	GA	GD	Pts	Promotion
1	Magharoeli Chiatura	32	28	0	4	97	24	+73	84	Promotion to Umaglesi Liga
2	Meshakhte Tkibuli	32	24	1	7	72	27	+45	73	
3	Mertskhali Ozurgeti	32	22	1	9	68	37	+31	67	
4	Skuri Tsalenjikha	32	17	5	10	53	39	+14	56	
5	Sapovnela Terjola	32	16	7	9	60	41	+19	55	
6	Olimpia Khobi	32	17	2	13	70	51	+19	53	
7	Kolkheti Poti Reserve	32	17	5	10	53	26	+27	51 (Note: 5 points penalty)	
8	Imereti Khoni	32	16	3	13	57	55	+2	51	
9	Samegrelo Chkhorotsku	32	15	6	11	66	58	+8	51	
10	Salkino Martvili	32	16	2	14	53	47	+6	50	
11	Egrisi Senaki	32	14	6	12	48	41	+7	43	
12	Dinamo Batumi Reserve	32	10	6	16	37	48	−11	36	
13	Sulori Vani	32	10	5	17	39	52	−13	35	
14	Odishi Zugdidi Reserve	32	6	3	23	26	50	−24	21	
15	Torpedo Kutaisi Reserve	32	5	3	24	22	78	−56	18	
16	Kakhaberi Khelvachauri	32	4	4	24	30	111	−81	16	
17	Mamisoni Oni	32	4	3	25	34	100	−66	15	

Source: rsssf.org

== East Group ==
Pos	Team	Pld	W	D	L	GF	GA	GD	Pts	Promotion
1	Morkinali Tbilisi	38	32	5	1	101	12	+89	101	Promotion to Umaglesi Liga
2	Lokomotivi Tbilisi	38	30	7	1	88	11	+77	97	Promotion to Umaglesi Liga
3	FC Tskhinvali	38	25	3	10	84	42	+42	78	
4	ASK Tbilisi	38	22	5	11	80	55	+25	71	
5	Dinamo-2 Tbilisi	38	20	10	8	95	33	+62	70	
6	ShSS Akademia Tbilisi	38	20	8	10	87	33	+54	68	
7	Tori Borjomi	38	21	4	13	51	52	−1	67	
8	Iberia Kareli	38	21	3	14	65	47	+18	66	
9	Kodako Tbilisi	38	19	9	10	66	48	+18	66	
10	Armazi Mtskheta	38	21	2	15	83	62	+21	65	
11	Shiraki Dedoplistskaro	38	17	14	7	58	45	+13	65	
12	TSU-2 Tbilisi	38	13	2	23	50	75	−25	41	
13	Meskheti Akhaltsikhe	38	10	3	25	51	84	−33	33	
14	35-STU Tbilisi	38	8	8	22	56	90	−34	32	
15	Durudji Kvareli	38	8	7	23	29	85	−56	31	
16	Mretebi Tbilisi	38	7	8	23	37	73	−36	29	
17	Zhineri Zhinvali	38	9	5	24	50	120	−70	27 (Note: 5 points penalty)	
18	Chabukiani	38	6	9	23	37	74	−37	27	
19	Energetikosi Gardabani	38	8	4	26	45	99	−54	23	
20	Avaza Tbilisi	38	2	6	30	29	97	−68	12	

Source: rsssf.org

== See also ==
- 1996–97 Umaglesi Liga
- 1996–97 Georgian Cup
