= Chabukiani =

Georgian family name

The Chabukiani (Georgian: ჭაბუკიანი) is a Georgian family name from the Lechkhumi region in north-western Georgia.

The Chabukiani family name comes from these towns of Lechkhumi: Alpana, Agvi, Bardnala, Dekhviri, Lasuriashi, Laskhana, Latsoria, Lajana, Lesindi, Lukhvano, Makhashi, Nakuraleshi, Nasperi, Orbeli, Okhureshi, Kulbaki, Gvirishi, Chkhuteli, Tsageri and Dsilamieri.

== Notable members ==
- Vakhtang Chabukiani, Georgian ballet dancer, choreographer and teacher
