= 1995–96 Pirveli Liga =

1995–96 Pirveli Liga was the seventh season of the Georgian Pirveli Liga. The 1995–96 season saw 39 teams in competition: 19 in the Eastern zone, and 20 in the Western zone. Pirveli Liga is the second division of Georgian football. It consists of reserve and professional teams.

== Eastern zone ==
Pos	Team	Pld	W	D	L	GF	GA	GD	Pts	Promotion
1	Merani-91 Tbilisi (P)	36	28	4	4	103	25	+78	88	Promotion to Umaglesi Liga
2	Dinamo-2 Tbilisi	36	26	3	7	99	27	+72	81	
3	Morkinali Tbilisi	36	25	6	5	73	24	+49	81	
4	Armazi Mtskheta	36	20	8	8	49	27	+22	68	
5	SSS-Akademia Tbilisi	36	19	8	9	63	48	+15	65	
6	ASK Tbilisi	36	19	5	12	71	45	+26	62	
7	Azoti-Akademia Rustavi	36	18	8	10	64	40	+24	62	
8	Universiteti Tbilisi	36	19	4	13	67	41	+26	61	
9	Energetikosi Gardabani	36	14	7	15	54	61	−7	49	
10	Algeti Marneuli	36	14	5	17	48	54	−6	47	
11	Iberia Kareli	36	14	4	18	51	66	−15	46	
12	Tskhinvali	36	12	7	17	48	43	+5	43	
13	FC Chabukiani	36	12	7	17	58	59	−1	43	
14	Shiraki Dedoplistskaro	36	9	8	19	48	79	−31	35	
15	Mretebi Tbilisi	36	9	7	20	34	90	−56	34	
16	Kodako Tbilisi	36	8	8	20	41	82	−41	32	
17	Zhineri Zhinvali	36	7	8	21	38	89	−51	29	
18	Meskheti Akhaltsikhe	36	6	5	25	39	101	−62	23	
19	Tori Borjomi	36	5	4	27	31	78	−47	19	

(P) Promoted

== Western zone ==
Pos	Team	Pld	W	D	L	GF	GA	GD	Pts	Promotion
1	Samgurali Tskaltubo (P)	38	33	3	2	132	28	+104	102	Promotion to Umaglesi Liga
2	Anzheli Abasha	38	33	2	3	96	27	+69	101	
3	Magaroeli Chiatura	38	26	4	8	94	44	+50	82	
4	Shukura Kobuleti	38	24	6	8	109	48	+61	78	
5	Kakhaberi Khelvachauri	38	22	3	13	77	58	+19	69	
6	Sulori Vani	38	19	6	13	68	54	+14	63	
7	Mamisoni Oni	38	17	3	18	69	73	−4	54	
8	Meshakhte Tkibuli	38	16	6	16	63	61	+2	54	
9	Mertskhali Ozurgeti	38	15	9	14	51	57	−6	54	
10	Rtsmena Kutaisi	38	16	4	18	68	58	+10	52	
11	Imereti Khoni	38	15	7	16	56	53	+3	52	
12	Dinamo-2 Zugdidi	38	13	7	18	65	74	−9	46	
13	Kolkheti-2 Poti	38	13	6	19	48	59	−11	45	
14	Skuri Tsalenjikha	38	12	5	21	50	67	−17	41	
15	Samegrelo Chkhorotsku	38	11	8	19	61	80	−19	41	
16	Sapovnela Terjola	38	10	11	17	51	80	−29	41	
17	Margveti-2 Zestaponi	38	12	3	23	54	83	−29	39	
18	Chkherimela Kharagauli	38	12	3	23	59	112	−53	39	
19	Chikhura Sachkhere	38	10	3	25	62	124	−62	33	
20	Bakhmaro Chokhatauri	38	0	3	35	40	133	−93	3	

(P) Promoted

Promoted to First Division: Samgurali.

== See also ==
- 1995–96 Umaglesi Liga
- 1995–96 Georgian Cup
