= 1995–96 Umaglesi Liga =

Georgian football league season

Umaglesi Liga
- Season: 1995–96
- Dates: 2 August 1995 – 27 May 1996
- Champions: Dinamo Tbilisi; 7th Georgian title
- Relegated: Egrisi Senaki; Duruji Kvareli
- UEFA Cup: Dinamo Tbilisi; Margveti Zestafoni
- Cup Winners' Cup: Dinamo Batumi
- Intertoto Cup: Kolkheti Poti
- Matches played: 240
- Goals scored: 901 (3.75 per match)
- Top goalscorer: Zviad Endeladze (40)
- Biggest home win: Dinamo Tbilisi 11–0 Duruji; Dinamo Batumi 11–0 Duruji
- Biggest away win: Duruji 2–8 Dinamo Tbilisi; Duruji 0–6 Torpedo
- Highest scoring: Dinamo Tbilisi 11–0 Duruji; Dinamo Batumi 11–0 Duruji; Samtredia 8–3 Guria; Dila 8–3 Duruji

The 1995–96 Umaglesi Liga was the seventh season of top-tier football in Georgia. It began on 2 August 1995 and ended on 27 May 1996. Dinamo Tbilisi were the defending champions.

== Locations ==
Location of teams in 1995–96 Umaglesi Liga

== League standings ==
| Pos | Team | Pld | W | D | L | GF | GA | GD | Pts | Qualification or relegation |
|---|---|---|---|---|---|---|---|---|---|---|
| 1 | Dinamo Tbilisi (C) | 30 | 25 | 4 | 1 | 109 | 16 | +93 | 79 | Qualification for the UEFA Cup preliminary round |
| 2 | Margveti Zestafoni | 30 | 22 | 2 | 6 | 85 | 37 | +48 | 68 | Qualification for the UEFA Cup preliminary round |
| 3 | Kolkheti-1913 Poti | 30 | 22 | 2 | 6 | 69 | 38 | +31 | 68 | Qualification for the Intertoto Cup group stage |
| 4 | Samtredia | 30 | 20 | 8 | 2 | 96 | 38 | +58 | 68 | |
| 5 | Metalurgi Rustavi | 30 | 22 | 0 | 8 | 70 | 36 | +34 | 66 | |
| 6 | Dinamo Batumi | 30 | 16 | 6 | 8 | 68 | 28 | +40 | 54 | Qualification for the Cup Winners' Cup qualifying round |
| 7 | Torpedo Kutaisi | 30 | 15 | 7 | 8 | 69 | 49 | +20 | 52 | |
| 8 | Dila Gori | 30 | 12 | 4 | 14 | 53 | 55 | −2 | 40 | |
| 9 | Sioni Bolnisi | 30 | 11 | 0 | 19 | 38 | 64 | −26 | 33 | |
| 10 | Iveria Khashuri | 30 | 10 | 3 | 17 | 33 | 57 | −24 | 33 | |
| 11 | Dinamo Odishi Zugdidi | 30 | 9 | 3 | 18 | 42 | 63 | −21 | 30 | |
| 12 | Shevardeni-1906 Tbilisi (Note: Shevardeni were merged with Universiteti Tbilisi and from the following season played as TSU Tbilisi.) | 30 | 9 | 3 | 18 | 40 | 61 | −21 | 30 | |
| 13 | Guria Lanchkhuti | 30 | 9 | 0 | 21 | 35 | 74 | −39 | 27 | |
| 14 | Kakheti Telavi | 30 | 8 | 3 | 19 | 29 | 68 | −39 | 27 | |
| 15 | Egrisi Senaki (R) | 30 | 5 | 2 | 23 | 42 | 90 | −48 | 17 | Relegation to Pirveli Liga |
| 16 | Duruji Kvareli (R) | 30 | 1 | 1 | 28 | 23 | 127 | −104 | 4 | Relegation to Pirveli Liga |

Source: rsssf.org
Rules for classification: 1st points; 2nd matches won; 3rd head-to-head
(C) Champions; (R) Relegated

== Results ==
| Home \ Away | DIL | DBA | DIN | DZU | DUR | EGR | GUR | IKH | KTL | KOL | MZS | MET | SAM | SHE | SIO | TKU |
|---|---|---|---|---|---|---|---|---|---|---|---|---|---|---|---|---|
| Dila Gori | | 2–0 | 1–6 | 1–0 | 8–3 | 4–3 | 2–0 | 4–1 | 5–0 | 0–1 | 4–2 | 2–3 | 1–1 | 1–1 | 3–0 | 3–2 |
| Dinamo Batumi | 2–0 | | 1–3 | 5–0 | 11–0 | 3–1 | 3–0 | 3–1 | 5–0 | 0–1 | 3–1 | 2–1 | 3–4 | 7–0 | 3–0 | 1–1 |
| Dinamo Tbilisi | 1–0 | 1–1 | | 1–0 | 11–0 | 3–0 | 3–0 (Note: Match awarded.) | 5–0 | 7–1 | 4–0 | 6–1 | 4–0 | 3–1 | 3–0 | 8–0 | 5–1 |
| Dinamo Odishi Zugdidi | 1–0 | 1–3 | 1–5 | | 4–0 | 5–3 | 2–0 | 0–0 | 2–1 | 1–3 | 3–4 | 1–3 | 2–2 | 0–0 | 3–0 | 3–4 |
| Duruji Kvareli | 0–1 | 0–0 | 2–8 | 0–1 | | 3–0 | 3–5 | 2–5 | 0–1 | 1–3 | 2–6 | 1–5 | 1–6 | 0–1 | 1–3 | 0–6 |
| Egrisi Senaki | 0–3 | 1–3 | 1–3 | 0–1 | 7–1 | | 1–0 | 1–0 | 2–2 | 3–6 | 0–2 | 1–4 | 2–4 | 1–4 | 3–0 | 2–6 |
| Guria Lanchkhuti | 2–0 | 1–0 | 0–3 | 2–1 | 4–1 | 8–2 | | 1–2 | 2–1 | 1–4 | 0–4 | 0–3 | 1–6 | 1–0 | 0–1 | 2–0 |
| Iveria Khashuri | 2–1 | 1–0 | 1–1 | 2–1 | 1–0 | 1–2 | 2–1 | | 1–0 | 2–3 | 0–4 | 1–2 | 3–5 | 2–1 | 1–0 | 1–1 |
| Kakheti Telavi | 2–2 | 0–2 | 1–5 | 2–1 | 3–0 | 4–1 | 2–1 | 1–0 | | 0–2 | 1–3 | 0–2 | 1–1 | 1–0 | 1–0 | 0–2 |
| Kolkheti-1913 Poti | 3–0 | 1–1 | 1–1 | 1–0 | 4–0 | 1–0 | 3–0 | 3–0 | 5–2 | | 3–1 | 2–1 | 0–2 | 5–1 | 1–0 | 3–2 |
| Margveti Zestafoni | 1–1 | 2–0 | 1–0 | 4–0 | 7–0 | 5–1 | 3–0 | 3–0 | 3–0 | 4–2 | | 3–0 | 0–0 | 4–0 | 5–2 | 5–3 |
| Metalurgi Rustavi | 5–1 | 1–0 | 0–2 | 3–1 | 4–0 | 4–1 | 3–0 | 2–1 | 3–0 | 3–1 | 1–0 | | 2–1 | 3–2 | 5–0 | 4–3 |
| Samtredia | 4–1 | 2–2 | 0–0 | 5–2 | 3–0 | 3–1 | 8–3 | 4–1 | 4–1 | 4–0 | 3–1 | 3–0 | | 4–2 | 5–0 | 2–2 |
| Shevardeni-1906 Tbilisi | 3–0 | 2–3 | 1–5 | 0–1 | 4–0 | 2–0 | 3–0 | 3–1 | 1–0 | 1–3 | 0–1 | 0–2 | 4–1 | | 2–1 | 2–3 |
| Sioni Bolnisi | 4–2 | 0–1 | 0–1 | 5–2 | 4–2 | 3–0 | 3–0 | 2–0 | 3–0 | 0–2 | 1–3 | 0–2 | 0–3 | 3–1 | | 3–1 |
| Torpedo Kutaisi | 2–0 | 0–0 | 0–1 | 4–2 | 1–0 | 2–2 | 5–0 | 1–0 | 3–1 | 3–2 | 2–1 | 2–0 | 2–2 | 2–2 | 3–0 | |

Source: rsssf.org
Legend: Blue = home team win; Yellow = draw; Red = away team win.

== Top goalscorers ==
| Rank | Goalscorer | Team | Goals |
|---|---|---|---|
| 1 | (Georgia (country)) Zviad Endeladze | Margveti Zestafoni | 40 |
| 2 | (Georgia (country)) Mikheil Ashvetia | Torpedo Kutaisi | 31 |
| 3 | (Georgia (country)) Aleksandre Iashvili | Dinamo Tbilisi | 26 |
| 4 | (Georgia (country)) Zurab Ionanidze | Samtredia | 23 |
| 5 | (Georgia (country)) Kakhaber Gogichaishvili | Dinamo Tbilisi | 19 |
| 6 | (Georgia (country)) David Chaladze | Metalurgi Rustavi | 18 |
| 7 | (Georgia (country)) Giorgi Demetradze | Dinamo Tbilisi | 17 |
| 8 | (Georgia (country)) Nugzar Mikaberidze | Kolkheti-1913 Poti | 16 |
| 8 | (Georgia (country)) Kakhaber Aladashvili | Metalurgi Rustavi | 16 |
| 10 | (Georgia (country)) Giorgi Daraselia | Samtredia | 13 |
| 10 | (Georgia (country)) Nugzar Tvaradze | Egrisi Senaki | 13 |
| 10 | (Georgia (country)) Temur Tugushi | Dinamo Batumi | 13 |
| 10 | (Georgia (country)) David Ujmajuridze | Dinamo Batumi | 13 |

== See also ==
- 1995–96 Pirveli Liga
- 1995–96 Georgian Cup
