= Akaki Devadze =

Georgian footballer

Personal information
- Date of birth: 28 November 1971 (age 54)
- Place of birth: Tbilisi, Soviet Union
- Height: 1.84 m (6 ft 0 in)
- Position: Goalkeeper

Senior career*
| Years | Team | Apps | (Gls) |
| 1989 | Dila Gori | 5 | (0) |
| 1989–1990 | Iberia Tbilisi | 8 | (0) |
| 1991–1992 | Margveti Zestaponi | 51 | (0) |
| 1992–1993 | Shevardeni-1906 Tbilisi | 31 | (0) |
| 1993–1994 | Kolkheti-1913 Poti | 20 | (0) |
| 1994–1995 | Shevardeni-1906 Tbilisi | 12 | (0) |
| 1995–1996 | Rostselmash Rostov-on-Don | 32 | (0) |
| 1996–1997 | Hapoel Tayibe | 15 | (0) |
| 1997–1999 | Maccabi Ironi Ashdod | 51 | (0) |
| 2000–2002 | FC Merani-91 Tbilisi | 23 | (0) |
| 2003 | Kazbegi Tbilisi | | |
| 2003–2004 | Spartaki Tbilisi | 6 | (1) |
| 2004–2005 | FC Tbilisi | 9 | (0) |
| 2005–2006 | Spartaki Tbilisi | 14 | (0) |
| 2006–2008 | Mglebi Zugdidi | 8 | (0) |

International career
| 1992–2005 | Georgia | 20 | (0) |
- * Club domestic league appearances and goals

Akaki Devadze (Georgian: აკაკი დევაძე; born 28 November 1971) is a Georgian retired professional footballer who played as a goalkeeper. He played for the Georgia national team between 1992 and 1996 and from 2004 to 2005, and was capped 20 times.
