= 2002–03 2. Bundesliga =

29th season of the second-tier football league in Germany

2. Bundesliga
- Season: 2002–03
- Champions: SC Freiburg
- Promoted: SC Freiburg; 1. FC Köln; Eintracht Frankfurt
- Relegated: Eintracht Braunschweig; SSV Reutlingen; FC St. Pauli; Waldhof Mannheim
- Top goalscorer: Andriy Voronin (20)

The 2002–03 2. Bundesliga was the 29th season of the 2. Bundesliga, the second tier of the German football league system. SC Freiburg, 1. FC Köln and Eintracht Frankfurt were promoted to the Bundesliga while Eintracht Braunschweig, SSV Reutlingen, FC St. Pauli and Waldhof Mannheim were relegated to the Regionalliga.

== League table ==
For the 2002–03 season Wacker Burghausen, Eintracht Trier, VfB Lübeck and Eintracht Braunschweig were newly promoted to the 2. Bundesliga from the Regionalliga while SC Freiburg, 1. FC Köln and FC St. Pauli had been relegated to the league from the Bundesliga.

Locations of the participating teams of the 2002–03 season

Pos	Team	Pld	W	D	L	GF	GA	GD	Pts	Promotion or relegation
1	SC Freiburg (C, P)	34	20	7	7	58	32	+26	67	Promotion to Bundesliga
2	1. FC Köln (P)	34	18	11	5	63	45	+18	65	Promotion to Bundesliga
3	Eintracht Frankfurt (P)	34	17	11	6	59	33	+26	62	Promotion to Bundesliga
4	Mainz 05	34	19	5	10	64	39	+25	62	
5	SpVgg Greuther Fürth	34	15	12	7	52	48	+4	57	
6	Alemannia Aachen	34	14	9	11	57	48	+9	51	
7	Eintracht Trier	34	14	6	14	53	46	+7	48	
8	MSV Duisburg	34	12	10	12	42	47	−5	46	
9	Union Berlin	34	10	15	9	36	48	−12	45	
10	Wacker Burghausen	34	10	14	10	48	41	+7	44	
11	VfB Lübeck	34	13	5	16	51	50	+1	44	
12	LR Ahlen	34	11	7	16	48	60	−12	40	
13	Karlsruher SC	34	9	12	13	35	47	−12	39	
14	Rot-Weiß Oberhausen	34	10	7	17	38	48	−10	37	
15	Eintracht Braunschweig (R)	34	8	10	16	33	53	−20	34	Relegation to Regionalliga (Note: FC St. Pauli and Eintracht Braunschweig were relegated to Regionalliga Nord. Waldhof Mannheim and SSV Reutlingen were relegated to Regionalliga Süd.)
16	SSV Reutlingen (Note: SSV Reutlingen were docked six points for violating the licensing requirements.) (R)	34	11	6	17	43	53	−10	33	Relegation to Regionalliga
17	FC St. Pauli (R)	34	7	10	17	48	67	−19	31	Relegation to Regionalliga
18	Waldhof Mannheim (R)	34	6	7	21	32	71	−39	25	Relegation to Regionalliga

Source: Bundesliga.de
Rules for classification: 1) points; 2) goal difference; 3) number of goals scored.
(C) Champions; (P) Promoted; (R) Relegated

== Results ==
Home \ Away	AAC	LRA	UNB	EBS	WBU	DUI	SGE	SCF	SGF	KSC	KOE	LUE	M05	WMA	RWO	R05	STP	TRI
Alemannia Aachen	—	3–0	3–0	1–3	2–3	1–0	1–0	0–1	0–0	2–0	0–0	4–1	3–0	1–2	2–0	3–1	4–1	0–1
LR Ahlen	1–2	—	1–1	1–2	2–4	0–0	1–1	1–3	3–0	2–2	0–0	1–0	4–3	1–4	2–1	2–0	3–2	2–1
Union Berlin	3–2	1–1	—	0–1	2–2	0–0	1–1	1–1	2–2	0–0	0–3	3–1	0–2	1–1	0–0	0–0	4–2	1–3
Eintracht Braunschweig	2–3	1–0	1–2	—	0–0	0–1	0–0	0–2	1–1	1–2	1–1	1–1	1–4	4–2	2–1	1–2	0–1	1–1
Wacker Burghausen	2–2	3–1	0–1	4–2	—	1–1	3–3	1–2	1–3	0–0	2–0	0–0	0–2	2–0	3–0	1–0	1–1	1–1
MSV Duisburg	3–3	2–1	0–1	1–1	0–0	—	0–2	3–2	1–0	2–0	2–2	1–0	1–0	0–0	3–0	2–0	2–1	2–4
Eintracht Frankfurt	1–1	4–1	0–0	0–0	0–2	2–1	—	1–1	2–0	2–1	1–1	3–1	1–0	4–1	1–0	6–3	4–0	2–3
SC Freiburg	1–1	4–0	4–0	2–0	2–1	3–1	0–2	—	1–1	3–1	3–0	2–1	1–0	4–1	5–2	1–4	1–1	1–0
Greuther Fürth	0–0	1–1	1–1	3–0	2–2	1–0	0–1	4–0	—	0–0	2–0	2–1	2–0	5–0	2–2	2–0	2–1	1–2
Karlsruher SC	1–2	2–4	3–2	1–0	2–1	1–1	0–2	1–1	2–1	—	0–1	1–2	0–0	1–1	2–1	0–0	1–1	1–1
1. FC Köln	3–3	2–1	7–0	1–1	1–0	4–3	3–2	1–0	3–2	3–0	—	2–1	1–4	3–1	2–0	1–1	2–1	1–3
VfB Lübeck	2–0	4–1	0–1	2–1	3–1	1–1	1–3	2–0	1–2	2–0	1–1	—	1–3	3–1	1–0	0–0	6–0	3–1
Mainz 05	3–1	1–0	1–0	3–1	2–0	3–1	3–2	0–0	1–3	2–2	2–2	5–1	—	2–0	2–1	1–3	1–1	2–0
Waldhof Mannheim	2–1	0–2	1–2	1–1	0–4	1–2	0–1	0–3	0–0	0–2	1–2	2–1	1–5	—	1–0	0–0	2–5	0–2
Rot-Weiß Oberhausen	1–1	2–1	2–2	2–0	0–0	3–1	0–2	1–0	2–3	3–1	2–2	3–1	1–0	0–1	—	3–1	3–0	2–1
SSV Reutlingen	5–0	1–2	0–1	0–1	0–0	2–4	1–0	0–2	2–4	0–3	1–2	1–3	1–2	3–2	2–0	—	2–0	3–2
FC St. Pauli	1–4	1–4	2–2	7–1	2–2	4–0	1–1	0–1	1–1	1–2	2–3	2–0	1–4	2–1	0–0	1–2	—	0–0
Eintracht Trier	4–1	2–1	0–1	0–1	2–1	3–0	2–2	0–1	1–2	3–0	2–3	1–3	2–1	2–2	1–0	1–2	1–2	—

Source: DFB
Legend: Blue = home team win; Yellow = draw; Red = away team win.

== Top scorers ==
The league's top scorers:

Goals	Player	Team
20	(Ukraine) Andriy Voronin	1. FSV Mainz 05
18	(Germany) Nico Frommer	SSV Reutlingen
18	(Croatia) Josef Ivanović	Alemannia Aachen
18	(Germany) Matthias Scherz	1. FC Köln
15	(Bosnia and Herzegovina) Zlatan Bajramović	SC Freiburg
15	(Germany) Marius Ebbers	MSV Duisburg
13	(Tunisia) Najeh Braham	Eintracht Trier
13	(Germany) Dirk Lottner	1. FC Köln
13	(Germany) Sascha Rösler	SpVgg Greuther Fürth
12	(Germany) Bruno Labbadia	Karlsruher SC
