= 1995–96 Georgian Cup =

Tournament details
- Country: Georgia
- Teams: 27

Final positions
- Champions: Dinamo Tbilisi
- Runners-up: Dinamo Batumi

The 1995–96 Georgian Cup (also known as the David Kipiani Cup) was the fifty-second season overall and sixth since independence of the Georgian annual football tournament.

== Round of 32 ==
Team 1	Agg.	Team 2	1st leg	2nd leg
Ahzheli Abasha	3–6	Iveria Khashuri	3–2	0–4
Universiteti Tbilisi	1–10	Torpedo Kutaisi	0–6	1–4
Armazi Mtskheta	2–3	Dinamo-2 Tbilisi	1–1	1–2
Mretebi Tbilisi	2–4	Dila Gori	1–2	1–2
Iberia Kareli	3–9	Egrisi Senaki	1–1	2–8
Magharoeli Chiatura	2–4	Dinamo Zugdidi	2–1	0–3
Rtsmena Kutaisi	2–7	Margveti Zestaponi	0–1	2–6
Kakheti Telavi	2–1	Shevardeni-1906 Tbilisi	0–0	2–1
Duruji Kvareli	2–9	Kolkheti-1913 Poti	2–4	0–5
Guria Lanchkhuti	5–8	Metalurgi Rustavi	2–3	2–5
SSS-Akademia Tbilisi	3–0	Algeti Marneuli	2–0	1–0
Merani-91 Tbilisi	1–1 (a)	Sioni Bolnisi	1–1	0–0

== Round of 16 ==
Team 1	Agg.	Team 2	1st leg	2nd leg
Samtredia	4–1	Iveria Khashuri	2–0	2–1
Torpedo Kutaisi	7–4	Dinamo-2 Tbilisi	4–1	3–3
Dila Gori	w/o	Egrisi Senaki	4–2	–
Dinamo Zugdidi	6–6 (a)	Margveti Zestaponi	4–4	2–2
Kakheti Telavi	2–4	Kolkheti-1913 Poti	1–1	1–3
Metalurgi Rustavi	1–2	Dinamo Batumi	1–0	0–2
SSS-Akademia Tbilisi	2–2 (a)	Sioni Bolnisi	1–0	1–2

== Quarterfinals ==
Team 1	Agg.	Team 2	1st leg	2nd leg
Torpedo Kutaisi	0–2	Samtredia	0–0	0–2
Dila Gori	0–7	Dinamo Tbilisi	0–3	0–4
Kolkheti-1913 Poti	2–3	Margveti Zestaponi	2–2	0–1
SSS-Akademia Tbilisi	0–4	Dinamo Batumi	0–0	0–4

== Semifinals ==
Team 1	Agg.	Team 2	1st leg	2nd leg
Samtredia	1–4	Dinamo Tbilisi	1–1	0–3
Dinamo Batumi	3–1	Margveti Zestaponi	1–0	2–1

== Final ==
26 May 1996

Dinamo Tbilisi	1–0 (a.e.t.)	Dinamo Batumi
Inalishvili 96'

Boris Paichadze Stadium, Tbilisi
Attendance: 30,000
Referee: Tamaz Latsabidze (Surami)

== See also ==
- 1995–96 Umaglesi Liga
- 1995–96 Pirveli Liga
