= 1994–95 Georgian Cup =

Tournament details
- Country: Georgia
- Teams: 29

Final positions
- Champions: Dinamo Tbilisi
- Runners-up: Dinamo Batumi

The 1994–95 Georgian Cup (also known as the David Kipiani Cup) was the fifty-first season overall and fifth since independence of the Georgian annual football tournament.

== Round of 32 ==
Team 1	Agg.	Team 2	1st leg	2nd leg
Sioni Bolnisi	w/o	Guria Lanchkhuti	2–2	–
Azoti Rustavi	6–1	Iberia Tbilisi	4–1	2–0
Dinamo Zugdidi	4–2	Shevardeni-1906 Tbilisi	2–1	2–1
Merani-91 Tbilisi	3–4	Zooveti Tbilisi	1–1	2–3
Dila Gori	7–1	Egrisi Senaki	5–0	2–1
Kolkheti-1913 Poti	1–2	Samtredia	1–0	0–2
Chabukiani	w/o	Sapovnela Terjola	0–1	–
Iveria Khashuri	7–1	Shiraki Dedoplistskaro	3–1	4–0
Tskhinvali	w/o	Kakheti Telavi	0–5	–
Dinamo Batumi	w/o	Samgurali Tskaltubo	–	–
Margveti Zestaponi	w/o	Metalurgi Rustavi	1–2	–
Meskheti Akhaltsikhe	4–5	Duruji Kvareli	4–1	0–4
SKA Tbilisi	2–4	Kiziki Tsnori	0–0	2–4
Meshakhte Tkibuli	3–12	Torpedo Kutaisi	2–6	1–6

== Round of 16 ==
Team 1	Agg.	Team 2	1st leg	2nd leg
Guria Lanchkhuti	4–2	Azoti Rustavi	4–1	0–1
Zooveti Tbilisi	w/o	Dinamo Zugdidi	1–1	–
Samtredia	5–2	Dila Gori	4–1	1–1
Sapovnela Terjola	4–4 (a)	Iveria Khashuri	1–1	3–3
Kakheti Telavi	4–5	Dinamo Batumi	4–2	0–3
Metalurgi Rustavi	5–0	Duruji Kvareli	1–0	4–0
Torpedo Kutaisi	w/o	Kiziki Tsnori	2–1	–

== Quarterfinals ==
Team 1	Agg.	Team 2	1st leg	2nd leg
Dinamo Zugdidi	6–3	Guria Lanchkhuti	4–1	2–2
Samtredia	3–5	Dinamo Tbilisi	2–0	1–5
Dinamo Batumi	4–2	Sapovnela Terjola	3–1	1–1
Kiziki Tsnori	3–12	Metalurgi Rustavi	2–6	1–6

== Semifinals ==
Team 1	Agg.	Team 2	1st leg	2nd leg
Dinamo Zugdidi	4–15	Dinamo Tbilisi	3–4	1–11
Metalurgi Rustavi	1–2	Dinamo Batumi	0–0	1–2

== Final ==
26 May 1995

Dinamo Tbilisi	1–0	Dinamo Batumi
Demetradze 27'

Boris Paichadze Stadium, Tbilisi
Attendance: 15,000
Referee: Otar Guntadze (Lanchkhuti)

== See also ==
- 1994–95 Umaglesi Liga
- 1994–95 Pirveli Liga
